= Louth Under-21 Football Championship =

Annual underage GAA football competition

- Founded: 1972
- Title holders: Mattock Rangers/Hunterstown Rovers (1st title)
- Most titles: Newtown Blues (8)

The Louth Under-21 Football Championship is a competition organised by Louth GAA for Gaelic football teams in County Louth.

== History ==
First contested in 1972, the inaugural winners were Cooley Kickhams. As is the case nationally, amalgamated parish teams are a regular feature of the competition due to lack of numbers. The county board removed the competition from the calendar in the mid-1980s but it returned in 1991. The competition has on occasion been run as an under-20 tournament, in line with changes introduced by the GAA in 2018. It reverted to the U-21 format in 2022. The county board scrapped the competition in 2023, when a new under-19 football championship was introduced in its place. The U-21 championship returned to the club calendar in 2025.

The McGeough Cup is presented to the captain of the winning side.

== Finals ==
Year	Winner	Score	Opponent	Score	Captain	Venue
1972	Cooley Kickhams	3-06	Glyde Rangers/Seán McDermott's/Westerns	0-13	-	Clan na Gael Park
1973	St Mary's/Hunterstown/John Mitchels	2-05	Glyde Rangers/Seán McDermott's/Westerns	1-03	-	Páirc Mochta
1974	St Mary's/Hunterstown	1-09	Newtown Blues/O'Raghallaighs/St Dominic's	0-05	-	Páirc Uí Mhuirí
1975	Dundalk Young Irelands/Seán O'Mahony's/Geraldines	0-08	Clan na Gael	1-04	-	Clan na Gael Park
1976	Dreadnots/St Fechin's	2-06	Kilkerley Emmets/Roche Emmets	1-03	-	Páirc Mhuire
1977	Dreadnots/St Fechin's	3-04	St Mochta's/Glyde Rangers/Seán McDermott's	0-06	Peter Briscoe	Páirc Mhuire
1978	Newtown Blues	0-07	Naomh Fionnbarra/Lann Léire/St Kevin's	0-04	Oliver Winters	Páirc Uí Mhuirí
1979	Newtown Blues	2-07	St Mochta's/Glyde Rangers/Seán McDermott's/Westerns/Fr. Bannon's	0-10	Ray Faulkner	The Grove
1980	Dundalk Young Irelands	0-07	Naomh Fionnbarra/Lann Léire/St Kevin's	0-06	Brian McGuinness	The Grove
1981	‡ Naomh Buithe	2-06	Cooley Kickhams	0-08	Michael Ward	Clan na Gael Park
1982	Cooley Kickhams	2-08	Naomh Fionnbarra/Lann Léire/St Kevin's	1-01	Seán Thornton	St Brigid's Park
1983	‡ St Fursey's	2-07 (replay)	St Mary's/ Hunterstown/John Mitchels	0-07	-	Tallanstown
1984	No Championship					
1985	No Championship					
1986	O'Connells/Stabannon Parnells	0-05	St Mary's/ Hunterstown/John Mitchels	0-04	Donal Murray	Knockbridge
1987	No Championship					
1988	No Championship					
1989	No Championship					
1990	No Championship					
1991	Dundalk Gaels	2-12	O'Connells/Stabannon Parnells	0-04	Ciarán Boyle	St Brigid's Park
1992	Dundalk Gaels	1-12	St Patrick's	1-08	Paul Loughran	St Brigid's Park
1993	Roche Emmets	1-12	St Joseph's/St Mochta's	2-08	John O'Hanlon	Knockbridge
1994	Roche Emmets	1-11	Kilkerley Emmets/Naomh Malachi	1-06	Paddy McArdle	Knockbridge
1995	St Joseph's/St Mochta's/Annaghminnon Rovers	0-12	Hunterstown/Glyde Rangers/Seán McDermott's/John Mitchels/Westerns	1-06	Paul McDonnell	The Grove
1996	Newtown Blues	2-09	O'Connells/Stabannon Parnells	2-07	Paddy Stone	Páirc Uí Mhuirí
1997	O'Connells/Stabannon Parnells	1-13 (AET)	St Joseph's/St Mochta's/Annaghminnon Rovers	1-10	-	Páirc Uí Mhuirí
1998	O'Connells/Stabannon Parnells	1-08	Oliver Plunketts	0-06	Mark Stanfield	Gaelic Grounds
1999	Newtown Blues	0-12	St Bride's	1-04	Ronan Philips	Páirc Uí Mhuirí
2000	St Bride's	1-11	St Patrick's	0-07	David J. McArdle	St Brigid's Park
2001	St Patrick's	1-13 (AET)	Kilkerley Emmets/Naomh Malachi	2-08	Damien Connor	St Brigid's Park
2002	Mattock Rangers/Hunterstown/Glen Emmets	3-04	Cooley Kickhams	0-07	-	McGeough Park
2003	Na Piarsaigh	3-10	Mattock Rangers/Hunterstown/Glen Emmets	1-08	Ronan McCartney	Cluskey Park
2004	Newtown Blues	1-11	Cooley Kickhams	2-06	Brian Kermode	Páirc Na nGael
2005	Newtown Blues	3-06	St Patrick's	1-06	Hugh McGinn	The Grove
2006	No Championship					
2007	‡ Mellifont Rovers	1-10	Cooley Kickhams	1-09	Adrian Reid	McGeough Park
2008	Dreadnots/St Fechin's	8-10	O'Connells/Stabannon Parnells	0-02	Niall Levins	Darver
2009	Geraldines	3-12	St Joseph's	1-10	Brendan Molloy	Darver
2010	Cancelled due to Winter cold snap					
2011	Geraldines	4-13	Naomh Máirtín	2-07	Jim McEneaney	Darver
2012	Geraldines	3-07	St Bride's	0-10	Shane O'Hanlon	Darver
2013	St Bride's	0-16	Clan na Gael	1-12	Gareth Hall	Darver
2014	O'Connells/Stabannon Parnells/John Mitchels	3-12 (AET)	Clan na Gael	2-12	-	Páirc de Róiste
2015	Mattock Rangers/Hunterstown/Glen Emmets	0-15	Naomh Fionnbarra/O'Connells	0-06	-	Darver
2016	Cooley Kickhams	3-07	Geraldines	0-09	Peter Thornton	Darver
2017	Newtown Blues	1-12	Mattock Rangers/ Hunterstown/Glen Emmets	3-05	Conor Moore	Darver
2018	Newtown Blues	0-16	Mattock Rangers/ Hunterstown/Glen Emmets	0-06	Ronan Levins	Darver
2019	St Mary's	4-11	St Bride's/St Mochta's	2-07	Conor Gillespie	Darver
2020	Cancelled - COVID-19					
2021	St Fechin's	1-13	St Joseph's/St Mochta's	2-03	John O'Connell	Páirc Uí Mhuirí
2022	Roche Emmets	1-06	Naomh Máirtín	0-04	Glen Stewart	Darver
2023	No Championship					
2024	No Championship					
2025	Mattock Rangers/Hunterstown	1-18	Cooley Kickhams	1-07	Liam Flynn/James Rogers	Darver

‡ Mellifont Rovers - Mattock Rangers/Hunterstown/Glen Emmets combination

‡ St Fursey's - Geraldines and St Bride's combination

‡ Naomh Buithe - combination team from Monasterboice, Collon, and Tullyallen parishes

== See also ==
- Mulligan, Fr.John (1984). The GAA in Louth - An Historical Record.
- Mulligan, Fr.John (2000). The GAA in Louth - An Historical Record (updated).
