= Louth Minor Football Championship =

Annual underage GAA football competition

- Founded: 1913
- Title holders: St Michael's (1st title)
- Most titles: Ardee Minors (12) Combination side
- Sponsors: LMFM

The Louth Minor Football Championship is an annual competition organised by Louth GAA between the premier teams in minor (under-18) Gaelic football in County Louth.

== Trophy ==
The winning team is presented with the Father Larry Murray Cup, named after the Louth priest who was a dedicated promoter of underage football and the Irish language.

The Ulster Minor Football Championship and Leinster Minor Football Championship trophies are also named in his honour, as is Páirc Uí Mhuirí in Dunleer (where Murray served as Parish priest), home to the Lann Léire club.

He trained the Louth minor team from 1934 to 1941, a very successful period for the county during which two All-Ireland Minor Football Championship titles were won.

== Finals ==
Year	Winner	Score	Opponent	Score	Winning Captain	Final Venue
1913	Dundalk Rangers	2-02	Hearts of Oriel (Dundalk)	2-00	-	Athletic Grounds
1914	Drogheda Stars	3-01	Geraldines	0-01	-	Athletic Grounds
1915	Ardee St Mochta's	4-05	Geraldines	1-00	-	Shamrock Lodge
1916	No Championship					
1917	No Championship					
1918	No Championship					
1919	Annagassan	2-01	Castle Emmets (Dundalk)	1-01	-	Athletic Grounds
1920	Clan na Gael	2-02 (Replay)	O'Mahony's	1-01	John McKenna	Athletic Grounds
1921	Dundalk John Dillons	1-05	Larks (Killineer)	0-01	-	Athletic Grounds
1922	Null and Void					
1923	Shamrocks (Dundalk)	2-02	Castlebellingham	0-00	-	Athletic Grounds
1924	‡ Shamrocks	0-02	Boyne Rangers	2-01	-	Castlebellingham
1925	Shamrocks	-	Unknowns (Dromiskin)	-	-	Athletic Grounds
1926	Dundalk John Dillons	1-01	Owen Roe's (Drogheda)	0-00	-	Athletic Grounds
1927	Clan na Gael	6-01	Owen Roe's	5-03	John Grey	Athletic Grounds
1928	Owen Roe's	1-03	Clan na Gael	1-00	Tom McKeown	Gaelic Grounds
1929	Null and Void					
1930	Ardee	2-04 (Replay)	Cooley Kickhams	2-01	-	Ferdia Park, Ardee
1931	St Magdalene's (Drogheda)	2-04	Cooley Kickhams	1-02	Vincent Kerr	The Grove
1932	Shamrock Rovers (Monasterboice)	4-04	Clan na Gael	0-06	-	Athletic Grounds
1933	Dundalk Gaels	2-07	Ardee	2-02	Paddy Hoey	Gaelic Grounds
1934	Dundalk Gaels	6-06	Woodington Rangers (Drogheda)	2-02	Jim Curran	Gaelic Grounds
1935	St Mary's College (Dundalk)	1-01	Woodington Rangers	0-01	-	Athletic Grounds
1936	St Mary's College	1-03	St Magdalene's	0-03	-	Athletic Grounds
1937	St Mary's College	4-08	St Magdalene's	1-03	Aidan Goulding	Gaelic Grounds
1938	St Magdalene's	0-03	Cooley Kickhams	0-00	-	Athletic Grounds
1939	St Mary's College	2-08	Ardee	0-04	-	Athletic Grounds
1940	St Mary's College	2-06	Ardee	0-02	-	Athletic Grounds
1941	De La Salle (Dundalk)	3-10	St Magdalene's	0-01	Tommy Larkin	Gaelic Grounds
1942	De La Salle	W/O	Ardee	scr.	-	Athletic Grounds
1943	Ardee	4-04	St Mary's College	1-06	Mickey Reynolds	Gaelic Grounds
1944	St Mary's College	3-05	Oliver Plunketts	0-05	-	Athletic Grounds
1945	St Mary's College	2-07	Ardee	0-04	Francesco Belotti	Gaelic Grounds
1946	Wolfe Tones	3-04	Ardee	0-01	Jim Gavin	Gaelic Grounds
1947	St Mary's College	4-04	Ardee	0-03	-	Athletic Grounds
1948	St Mary's College	4-03	Larks	2-01	Vincent Bransfield	Gaelic Grounds
1949	Null and Void					
1950	Ardee	1-05	Dundalk Gaels	1-02	Michael Brennan	The Grove
1951	Ardee	1-08	St Dominic's (Drogheda)	1-03	Michael Brennan	Athletic Grounds
1952	Clan na Gael	1-07	St Dominic's	1-05	Benny Toal	Athletic Grounds
1953	St Dominic's	1-02, 1-08 (R)	Clan na Gael	0-05, 1-06 (R)	Paddy Hallinan	Gaelic Grounds-Athletic Grounds (R)
1954	Ardee	0-09	Clan na Gael	2-01	Patsy Coleman	Athletic Grounds
1955	Naomh Mhuire (Drogheda)	5-10	Con Colbert's	0-01	Tom O'Connor	The Grove
1956	Newtown Blues	1-07	Dundalk Gaels	0-04	Jim Judge	Páirc Mhuire
1957	Newtown Blues	2-02	Ardee	1-03	Peter McKenna	The Grove
1958	Newtown Blues	2-05	Ardee	1-02	Terry Kelly	The Grove
1959	O'Raghallaighs	2-08	Clan na Gael	3-04	Leo Nawn	Páirc Mhuire
1960	O'Raghallaighs	5-09	Clan na Gael	2-07	Anthony Campbell	Knockbridge
1961	O'Raghallaighs	3-06	Clann Mhuire (Omeath)	2-07	Muckle McKeown	Gaelic Grounds
1962	Dundalk Gaels	1-05	O'Raghallaighs	1-04	Jimmy Kelleher	The Grove
1963	O'Raghallaighs	3-06	Baile Philip	2-04	Fergus McKeown	The Grove
1964	Ardee	1-05, 3-05 (R)	Newtown Blues	1-05, 0-02 (R)	Tony Breen	Knockbridge
1965	Ardee	3-10	Dowdallshill	2-04	Turlough McDonald	The Grove
1966	Ardee	0-11	Clann Mhuire	0-03	Tommy Reilly	St Brigid's Park
1967	Ardee	3-16	Naomh Buithe	0-04	Mattie Reilly	St Brigid's Park
1968	Cooley Kickhams	1-09	Collon Minors	2-03	Alo McGrath	St Brigid's Park
1969	Baile Talún	5-06	Cooley Kickhams	2-03	Gerry Sheridan	Páirc Mochta
1970	Newtown Blues	1-06, 3-03 (R)	Ardee	1-06, 0-07 (R)	Noel Crilly	Páirc Uí Mhuirí-Páirc Mochta (R)
1971	Cooley Kickhams	2-07	Ardee	1-05	Kevin Thornton	St Brigid's Park
1972	Ardee	1-09	Cooley Kickhams	1-04	Séamus O'Neill	St Brigid's Park
1973	Ardee	2-03	Dundalk Gaels	1-05	Jim Matthews	St Brigid's Park
1974	Dundalk Gaels	0-06, 1-09 (R)	Newtown Blues	0-06, 0-02 (R)	Mickey White	Páirc Mhuire
1975	Newtown Blues	0-08, 2-17 (Replay - AET)	St Brigid's	0-08, 1-10 (R)	Vincent Murray	Gaelic Grounds
1976	Clan na Gael	1-02	Oliver Plunketts	0-04	Seán Kieran	St Brigid's Park
1977	Kilkerley Emmets/Roche Emmets/Naomh Malachi	1-07	Ardee	0-09	Séamus Bellew	Páirc Uí Mhuirí
1978	Naomh Buithe	2-10	Ardee	1-05	Michael Ward	Gaelic Grounds
1979	Cooley Kickhams	2-11	Naomh Buithe	1-08	Tony McCarragher	Páirc Mochta
1980	Naomh Buithe	1-06	Clan na Gael	0-07	Declan Healy	Páirc Mhuire
1981	Clan na Gael	1-08	Cooley Kickhams	2-04	Colm Markey	St Brigid's Park
1982	Seán Treacy's/Baile Philib	1-07	Naomh Buithe	1-04	David Reilly	Gaelic Grounds
1983	Clan na Gael	1-05	Ardee	1-03	Kevin O'Hanlon	The Grove
1984	Cooley Kickhams	0-08	St Brigid's	0-04	Declan Larkin	Cluskey Park
1985	Seán Treacy's	2-09	Naomh Buithe	0-05	T.P. McHugh	St Brigid's Park
1986	Roche Emmets	3-10	Clan na Gael	1-06	Aidan McArdle	Cluskey Park
1987	Ardee	1-20	St Fursey's	1-02	Brian Scott	Tallanstown
1988	Clan na Gael	2-09	Ardee	1-04	Niall O'Donnell	Páirc Uí Mhuirí
1989	Dundalk Gaels	0-07, 2-05 (R)	Valley Rangers	0-07, 0-02 (R)	Niall Prenty	Gaelic Grounds-St Brigid's Park (R)
1990	Valley Rangers	1-14	St Michael's	1-06	Seán White	St Brigid's Park
1991	Roche Emmets	3-07	Dundalk Gaels	0-09	Aidan O'Neill	St Brigid's Park
1992	Roche Emmets	1-09	Valley Rangers	1-04	Paul Nash	St Brigid's Park
1993	Roche Emmets	0-08	Newtown Blues	0-02	Ciarán Nash	Gaelic Grounds
1994	St Joseph's/St Vincent's	2-11	Abbey Gaels/Emmití Óg	0-10	Gervaise Marron	The Grove
1995	St Fursey's	1-04	Newtown Blues	1-03	Paudie Lynch	Cluskey Park
1996	Oliver Plunketts	1-07	Newtown Blues	0-09	Gareth Coyle	Páirc Mhuire
1997	Dundalk Gaels	4-10	Cooley Kickhams	3-05	Peter McGinnity	Gaelic Grounds
1998	Cooley Kickhams	2-07	Clan na Gael	0-07	Seán O'Neill	St Brigid's Park
1999	Clan na Gael	4-04	Baile Talún	0-09	Ruairí Duffy	McGeough Park
2000	Clan na Gael	2-09	St Mary's (Ardee)	2-08	Gary Hoey	Gaelic Grounds
2001	Baile Talún	1-15	Seán Treacy's	1-08	Daniel Woods	Gaelic Grounds
2002	Valley Rangers	0-08	Na Piarsaigh	0-07	Paddy Keenan	Páirc Mhuire
2003	Oliver Plunketts	2-06	Baile Talún	0-10	Brian McKenna	St Brigid's Park
2004	Newtown Blues	1-13	Baile Talún	3-05	Niall Costello	Clan na Gael Park
2005	Cooley Kickhams	2-07	Na Piarsaigh	1-07	Keith White	Gaelic Grounds
2006	Cooley Kickhams	4-10	St Brigid's	1-10	Patrick McGrath	Clan na Gael Park
2007	Geraldines	1-12	Dundalk Young Irelands	1-07	Alan Breen	St Brigid's Park
2008	Geraldines	1-12	St Mochta's/St Bride's/Annaghminnon Rovers	2-05	Patrick Hoey	Gaelic Grounds
2009	St Joseph's	1-12	Geraldines	2-06	Alan McKenna	Clan na Gael Park
2010	St Joseph's	3-09	Dreadnots	1-11	Alan Lynch	Gaelic Grounds
2011	St Bride's	0-14	Geraldines	0-09	Patrick Reilly	Gaelic Grounds
2012	Oliver Plunketts	2-04	St Joseph's/O'Connells/Stabannon Parnells	1-05	Gary Keogh	Gaelic Grounds
2013	Geraldines	4-09	St Mary's	1-09	Josh Arrowsmith	Gaelic Grounds
2014	Newtown Blues	4-15	Geraldines	1-05	James Carter	Gaelic Grounds
2015	Newtown Blues	1-08, 6-12 (Replay - AET)	Naomh Máirtín	0-11, 2-14	Conor Farrell	Gaelic Grounds
2016	Naomh Máirtín	4-14	Newtown Blues	1-09	Sam Mulroy	Gaelic Grounds
2017	St Mary's	6-21	Geraldines	2-10	Philip Trainor	Gaelic Grounds
2018	St Mary's	1-17	St Mochta's/St Bride's	0-12	Liam Jackson	Gaelic Grounds
2019	Naomh Máirtín	2-08	St Joseph's	0-10	Seán Healy	Gaelic Grounds
2020	Cooley Kickhams/Cúchulainn Gaels	4-10	St Kevin's/St Michael's	2-10	Aaron Carolan/Paul Brennan	Darver
2021	St Kevin's/St Michael's	1-08, 0-08 (R)	St Fechin's	1-08, 2-01 (R)	Ryan Halpenny	Páirc Mhuire-Páirc Baile Fiach (R)
2022	St Mary's	1-10	Dundalk Gaels	1-07	Tadhg McDonnell	Clan na Gael Park
2023	St Mary's	1-14	St Michael's/John Mitchels/Lann Léire	0-06	Adam Gillespie	St Brigid's Park
2024	St Patrick's	3-03	Cooley Kickhams	1-08	Micheál O'Shaughnessy	McGeough Park
2025	Naomh Máirtín	1-14	St Mary's	0-12	Ciarán Devine	Gaelic Grounds
2026	St Michael's	1-12	St Fechin's	0-14	Darragh Murray	Gaelic Grounds

‡ Title awarded to Shamrocks on appeal

== Minor B Championship finals ==
Year	Winner	Opponent
1999	Roche Emmets (R)	Seán Treacy's (R)
2000	Wolfe Tones	Naomh Máirtín
2001	St Bride's	Lann Léire/St Kevin's
2002	St Fursey's	St Michael's
2003	Naomh Máirtín	St Joseph's/St Vincent's
2004	St Joseph's/St Vincent's	Kilkerley Emmets/Naomh Malachi
2005	Dundalk Young Irelands	St Michael's
2006	Geraldines	St Michael's
2007	St Nicholas	Naomh Fionnbarra
2008	Dundalk Gaels	Mellifont Rovers
2009	Roche Emmets	Na Piarsaigh
2010	St Fechin's	St Patrick's
2011	Naomh Fionnbarra/St Kevin's	Seán O'Mahony's
2012	Baile Talún	Naomh Máirtín
2013	Cooley Kickhams	Dundalk Gaels
2014	St Kevin's/Baile Talún	St Mary's
2015	Naomh Fionnbarra/Lann Léire	Dreadnots
2016	O'Connells/Stabannon Parnells/John Mitchels	Naomh Fionnbarra/Lann Léire
2017	Kilkerley Emmets/Naomh Malachi	Glen Emmets
2018	St Joseph's	Naomh Fionnbarra/Lann Léire
2019	Dreadnots	Naomh Fionnbarra/Lann Léire
2020	Oliver Plunketts (AET)	St Bride's (AET)
2021	Dundalk Gaels	Newtown Blues
2022	Glen Emmets	Naomh Fionnbarra
2023	Naomh Fionnbarra	St Patrick's
2024	Roche Emmets	Dundalk Young Irelands/Seán O'Mahony's
2025	Dreadnots	St Kevin's/Lann Léire
2026	Roche Emmets	St Mary's

== See also ==
- Mulligan, Fr.John (1984). The GAA in Louth - An Historical Record.
- Mulligan, Fr.John (2000). The GAA in Louth - An Historical Record (updated).
