= Louth Junior 2A Football League =

Junior league Gaelic competition

- Founded: 1941
- Title holders: St Mary's
- Most titles: Cooley Kickhams/St Mary's (11 titles)
- Sponsors: John O'Neill Sand and Gravel

The Louth Junior 2A Football League, or Division 4 of the county football Leagues, is an annual Gaelic football competition that was introduced by Louth GAA in 1941 and contested by the second teams of Senior clubs in County Louth. The captain of the winning team is presented with the Cairnes Cup.

== Format ==
A Final to determine the winner was held annually until 2015, when the format changed. At the end of the league programme, the team with the most points is now awarded the trophy. If two or more teams finish level on points at the top of the table, a play-off will decide the winner. The team that finishes bottom of the league is relegated to Division 5.

== Trophy ==
The Ranafast Cup was presented to each winning team from 1944 until 1999.

This trophy was purchased with money from the Fr Larry Murray Memorial Fund and named in memory of the Gaelic games and Irish language enthusiast priest's close association with Coláiste Bhríde in Ranafast. The Cairnes Cup was presented to the winners for the first time in 2000.

== Winners by Year ==
(R) = Replay

Year	Winner	Score	Opponent	Score
1941	Stabannon Parnells	1-05	Kilcurry	1-04
1942	Kilkerley Emmets	4-05	Lann Léire	3-04
1943	St Dominic's (Ardee)	1-07	Glyde Rangers	2-01
1944	Cooley Kickhams	2-05	Glyde Rangers	0-05
1945	St Mary's	4-05	Cooley Kickhams	2-03
1946	Fane Rangers	2-01	Cooley Kickhams	0-01
1947	Ramblers (Termonfeckin)	2-0	Red Hands (Martin's Cross)	1-01
1948	Walshestown Rovers	0-07	Cooley Kickhams	0-04
1949	St Mary's	6-07	St Colmcille's (Togher)	2-03
1950	St Colmcille's	7-09	St Mochta's	1-02
1951	St Michael's (Clogherhead)	3-05	Stabannon Parnells	0-02
1952	Seán McDermott's	1-08	Roche Emmets	1-05
1953	Lann Léire	1-14	Carlingford	2-04
1954	Hunterstown Rovers	1-04	Lann Léire	0-03
1955	Dreadnots	2-09	Seán McDermott's	1-06
1956	St Fechin's (R)	1-07	St Mochta's (R)	0-03
1957	St Fechin's	3-06	Seán O'Carroll's (Ardee)	2-04
1958	St Fechin's	1-07	Kilkerley Emmets	0-02
1959	Dreadnots	2-06	O'Connells	1-06
1960	Dreadnots	6-06	St Mary's	0-02
1961	Dreadnots (R)	2-09	Fane Rangers (R)	2-03
1962	Dreadnots	2-08	Fane Rangers	1-02
1963	Naomh Máirtín	2-05	Stabannon Parnells	0-03
1964	St Bride's	3-07	Naomh Fionnbarra	1-04
1965	Glen Emmets	1-05	St Bride's	0-05
1966	St Patrick's	2-04	St Mary's	2-03
1967	St Bride's	2-07	Stabannon Parnells	0-07
1968	Naomh Fionnbarra	2-04	St Bride's	0-06
1969	St Mochta's	1-05	St Kevin's	0-04
1970	Newtown Blues (R)	1-05	Hunterstown Rovers (R)	1-02
1971	Lann Léire	2-08	St Mochta's	0-06
1972	Hunterstown Rovers	2-15	St Kevin's	3-01
1973	Dreadnots	2-06	Kilkerley Emmets	0-07
1974	St Bride's	0-06	Dreadnots	0-03
1975	Westerns	3-04	Dreadnots	1-07
1976	Glen Emmets	3-12	O'Connells	0-02
1977	Mattock Rangers	3-05	Dundalk Young Irelands	1-08
1978	St Mary's	0-08	St Fechin's	0-06
1979	Mattock Rangers	0-02	St Bride's	0-01
1980	St Mary's	0-11	Kilkerley Emmets	1-03
1981	Kilkerley Emmets	3-05	Newtown Blues	1-08
1982	Newtown Blues	3-09	Geraldines	1-05
1983	St Joseph's	1-08	Kilkerley Emmets	0-03
1984	Geraldines	3-04	Naomh Fionnbarra	0-05
1985	Lann Léire	2-09	St Bride's	1-05
1986	Dundalk Gaels	2-07	Na Piarsaigh	0-07
1987	Roche Emmets	1-05	Naomh Fionnbarra	1-04
1988	St Mary's	1-05	St Patrick's	1-04
1989	Kilkerley Emmets	1-09	Clan na Gael	1-05
1990	Cooley Kickhams	1-08	St Mary's	0-09
1991	Clan na Gael	0-09	Glyde Rangers	0-03
1992	Clan na Gael	1-10	Lann Léire	1-02
1993	Cooley Kickhams	0-12	Clan na Gael	2-04
1994	Clan na Gael	1-09	St Mary's	0-07
1995	Dundalk Gaels (R)	0-10	Clan na Gael (R)	0-04
1996	Lann Léire	2-09	Dundalk Gaels	2-05
1997	Newtown Blues	2-15	Lann Léire	1-05
1998	Cooley Kickhams	2-07	St Patrick's	1-07
1999	Clan na Gael	1-11	St Mary's	1-10
2000	St Patrick's	1-12	Newtown Blues	2-07
2001	Cooley Kickhams	1-09	Clan na Gael	2-04
2002	Cooley Kickhams	2-03	Clan na Gael	0-06
2003	Clan na Gael	0-14	St Patrick's	0-08
2004	Mattock Rangers	2-10	Cooley Kickhams	1-08
2005	Cooley Kickhams	2-08	Newtown Blues	0-07
2006	Newtown Blues	1-07	Cooley Kickhams	0-09
2007	Newtown Blues	1-10	Cooley Kickhams	1-08
2008	Cooley Kickhams	1-05	Dundalk Gaels	1-04
2009	Newtown Blues	1-07	Cooley Kickhams	1-06
2010	St Mary's	0-08	Cooley Kickhams	0-06
2011	Cooley Kickhams	2-10	Clan na Gael	2-05
2012	St Joseph's	0-11	St Patrick's	0-07
2013	St Mary's	2-10	St Patrick's	1-06
2014	Clan na Gael	1-11	Naomh Máirtín	1-08
2015	Cooley Kickhams	0-13	St Bride's	0-07
2016	St Bride's	--	No Final	--
2017	Dundalk Gaels	--	No Final	--
2018	Mattock Rangers	1-14	St Bride's	1-04
2019	St Patrick's	1-15	St Mary's	2-08
2020	Cancelled (COVID-19)			
2021	Cooley Kickhams	3-12	St Mary's	2-03
2022	Naomh Máirtín	--	No Final	--
2023	St Mary's	0-12	Cooley Kickhams	1-04
2024	St Mary's	2-10	Cooley Kickhams	1-09
2025	St Mary's	2-13	Cooley Kickhams	1-11
2026	St Mary's	0-14	St Joseph's	0-13
