= Louth Intermediate Football League =

Intermediate league Gaelic competition

- Founded: 1978
- No. of teams: 12
- Title holders: Roche Emmets (1st title)
- Most titles: Dreadnots/Dundalk Gaels (6)
- Sponsors: John O'Neill Sand and Gravel

The Louth Intermediate Football League is an annual Gaelic football competition organised by Louth GAA for Division 2 teams in County Louth.

== Format ==
At the end of the league programme, the team with the most points is automatically promoted to Division 1 as league winners. The second-placed team can achieve promotion by winning a play-off against a Division 1 club. The team that finishes at the bottom of the league is relegated to Junior football.

== History ==
The competition was launched in 1978 when Louth GAA introduced the Intermediate football grade, situated between Senior and Junior levels. The first club to win the competition was Geraldines. A final to determine the winner was held each year until 1995, when the format changed.

== Trophy ==
The captain of the winning team receives the McShane Cup, named after Jimmy McShane, a former county board official and Lann Léire club member.

== Winners by Year ==
Year	Winner	Winning Captain
1996	Mattock Rangers	John Hanratty
1997	Naomh Fionnbarra	Stephen Devlin
1998	Mattock Rangers	Gerry Hanratty
1999	St Bride's	David Dunne
2000	Glyde Rangers	Rory McCoy
2001	Hunterstown Rovers	Niall Lynch
2002	Kilkerley Emmets	Barry Clarke
2003	Dundalk Gaels	Peter McGinnity
2004	Dreadnots	Darren Malone
2005	Seán O'Mahony's	Brendan Nordone
2006	Dundalk Gaels	Aidan Delaney
2007	Dundalk Gaels	Aidan Delaney
2008	Glyde Rangers	-
2009	O'Connells	Stuart Reynolds
2010	Dreadnots	Chris Mulroy
2011	O'Raghallaighs	James Moonan
2012	Dundalk Gaels	Seán Fee
2013	Geraldines	Jim McEneaney
2014	St Fechin's	Colm O'Neill
2015	Cooley Kickhams	Conor McGuinness
2016	Dundalk Gaels	Derek Crilly
2017	St Bride's	Patrick Reilly
2018	O'Raghallaighs	Ben Rogan
2019	St Fechin's	Bevan Duffy
2020	Cancelled (COVID-19)	
2021	Dundalk Young Irelands	Derek Maguire
2022	O'Raghallaighs	James Moonan
2023	Cooley Kickhams	Darren Marks
2024	Hunterstown Rovers	Ryan Burns
2025	Dundalk Gaels	Dylan McKeown
2026	Roche Emmets	Seán Dawe

=== Finals ===
(R) = Replay

Year	Winner	Score	Opponent	Score	Winning Captain
1978	Geraldines	3-03	Kilkerley Emmets	0-09	John Lynch
1979	Dreadnots	3-06	Glyde Rangers	1-06	Pádraig Califf
1980	Naomh Fionnbarra	3-06	Glyde Rangers	0-09	Peter Callaghan
1981	Dreadnots	2-08	St Joseph's	2-04	Pat Rath
1982	St Joseph's	1-10	Seán McDermott's	1-04	Danny Culligan
1983	Naomh Fionnbarra	1-08	St Bride's	0-04	Brendan Rogers
1984	St Patrick's	0-11	St Mary's	1-06	Diarmuid MacArtain
1985	Dreadnots	1-10	St Bride's	1-04	Pat Rath
1986	St Bride's	1-05	Mattock Rangers	0-04	Anthony McGuinness
1987	St Mary's	2-05	Geraldines	0-10	Gerry Rooney
1988	St Joseph's	2-03	Naomh Máirtin	0-05	Eugene McArdle
1989	Stabannon Parnells	0-09	Dundalk Gaels	1-05	Fiachra Bell
1990	St Kevin's	0-07	Dundalk Gaels	0-04	John McGrane
1991	Hunterstown Rovers	2-06	Dundalk Gaels	0-06	Brian Martin
1992	Lann Léire	2-08	St Kevin's	1-06	Stephen Flood
1993	Lann Léire	3-09	Hunterstown Rovers	3-08	Patrick Callan
1994	Lann Léire	0-10 (R)	Geraldines	0-06 (R)	Brendan Martin
1995	Dreadnots	0-06 (R)	St Kevin's	0-04 (R)	Liam Kelleher
