= Louth Junior A Football League =

Junior league Gaelic competition

- Founded: 1921
- No. of teams: 14
- Title holders: O'Connells (4th title)
- Most titles: Naomh Fionnbarra (6)
- Sponsors: John O'Neill Sand and Gravel

The Louth Junior A Football League, or Division 3 of the county football Leagues, is an annual Gaelic football competition. Introduced in 1921, it is contested by Junior clubs in County Louth. The captain of the winning team is presented with the Dixon Cup.

== Format ==
A Final to determine the winner was held annually until 1996, when the format changed. At the end of the league programme, the team with the most points is now awarded the trophy and is promoted to Division 2. The second-placed team can obtain promotion by winning a play-off involving a Division 2 club. Division 3 was split into separate A and B grades in 2019, before returning to the old format in advance of the 2025 season.

== Trophy ==
The MacArdle Cup was presented to each winning team until 2014, when it was replaced by the Dixon Cup.

== Finals ==
(R) = Replay

Year	Winner	Opponent
1921	Boyne Rangers (Drogheda)	Clan na Gael
1922	-	-
1923	-	-
1924	Con Colberts (Dundalk)	Wolfe Tones
1925	-	-
1926	St Dominic's (Dundalk)	Unknowns (Dromiskin)
1927	-	-
1928	Newtown Blues	Castlebellingham
1929	Clan na Gael	Newtown Blues
1930	Owen Roes (Drogheda)	Clan na Gael
1931	St Magdalene's (Drogheda)	Drogheda Gaelics
1932	Cooley Kickhams	St Magdalene's
1933	St Magdalene's	Hitchestown
1934	Dowdallshill	Geraldines
1935	Darver Young Irelands	St Mary's
1936	St Mochta's	Drogheda Gaelics
1937	St Bride's	St Mochta's
1938	Darver Young Irelands	St Mochta's
1939	Seán O'Mahony's	Ramblers United (Termonfeckin)
1940	Seán O'Mahony's	Owen Roes
1941	St Magdalene's (R)	Seán O'Mahony's (R)
1942	St Magdalene's	Stabannon Parnells
1943	Oliver Plunketts	Stabannon Parnells
1944	Western Rovers (Army team)	Owen Roes
1945	Parnells (Drogheda)	Seán O'Mahony's
1946	St Colmcille's (Togher)	Kilkerley Emmets
1947	Clan na Gael (R)	Parnells (R)
1948	Seán O'Mahony's	Parnells
1949	Dundalk Young Irelands	St Bride's
1950	Naomh Mhuire (Drogheda)	Dundalk Young Irelands
1951	Naomh Mhuire (R)	Dowdallshill (R)
1952	Darver Volunteers	Naomh Mhuire
1953	Clan na Gael	Darver Volunteers
1954	Clan na Gael	Darver Volunteers
1955	Roche Emmets	Newtown Blues
1956	Roche Emmets	Geraldines
1957	Geraldines	Glyde Rangers
1958	Geraldines	Seán McDermott's
1959	St Bride's	Hunterstown Rovers
1960	Naomh Fionnbarra	Wolfe Tones
1961	Geraldines	Mattock Rangers
1962	Wolfe Tones	Naomh Fionnbarra
1963	Naomh Fionnbarra	O'Raghallaighs
1964	Cooley Kickhams	Naomh Fionnbarra
1965	St Kevin's	Naomh Fionnbarra
1966	St Kevin's	St Bride's
1967	St Kevin's	St Bride's
1968	Cooley Kickhams (R)	St Kevin's (R)
1969	Glyde Rangers	John Mitchels
1970	St Patrick's	Wolfe Tones
1971	Naomh Fionnbarra	Clan na Gael
1972	St Patrick's	Naomh Fionnbarra
1973	St Mochta's	Naomh Fionnbarra
1974	Seán McDermott's	Dundalk Young Irelands
1975	St Fechin's	St Mochta's
1976	Dreadnots	St Fechin's
1977	Kilkerley Emmets	Dundalk Young Irelands
1978	Naomh Máirtín	Hunterstown Rovers
1979	St Fechin's	Hunterstown Rovers
1980	Naomh Máirtín	Roche Emmets
1981	John Mitchels	Roche Emmets
1982	Hunterstown Rovers	Cooley Kickhams
1983	Dundalk Gaels	Lann Léire
1984	Oliver Plunketts	Lann Léire
1985	Dundalk Gaels	Hunterstown Rovers
1986	Glyde Rangers	John Mitchels
1987	Seán O'Mahony's	Dundalk Gaels
1988	St Kevin's	John Mitchels
1989	Dowdallshill	O'Raghallaighs
1990	John Mitchels	O'Raghallaighs
1991	St Nicholas	St Mochta's
1992	O'Connells	John Mitchels
1993	Oliver Plunketts (R)	Glyde Rangers (R)
1994	O'Connells	Glyde Rangers
1995	St Bride's	Oliver Plunketts
1996	Oliver Plunketts	O'Raghallaighs

=== Winners by Year ===
Year	Winner
1997	Na Piarsaigh
1998	John Mitchels
1999	O'Connells
2000	Seán McDermott's
2001	Westerns
2002	St Nicholas
2003	Dowdallshill
2004	Glen Emmets
2005	Seán McDermott's
2006	Dundalk Young Irelands
2007	St Mochta's
2008	Naomh Fionnbarra
2009	Dundalk Young Irelands
2010	St Fechin's
2011	Naomh Fionnbarra
2012	Hunterstown Rovers
2013	Roche Emmets
2014	Naomh Fionnbarra
2015	Glyde Rangers
2016	Glen Emmets
2017	Glyde Rangers
2018	Dundalk Young Irelands
2019	Roche Emmets
2020	Cancelled (COVID-19)
2021	Glen Emmets
2022	Glen Emmets
2023	Stabannon Parnells
2024	Oliver Plunketts
2025	John Mitchels
2026	O'Connells

== 3B Winners ==
The winning team was promoted to 3A

Year	Winner
2019	Westerns
2020	Cancelled (COVID-19)
2021	Wolfe Tones
2022	Stabannon Parnells
2023	John Mitchels
2024	St Nicholas
