= St Joseph's GFC (Louth) =

Louth-based Gaelic games club

St Joseph's
- Naomh Seosamh CLG
- Founded: 1961
- County: Louth
- Nickname: The Joes
- Colours: Green, White and Gold
- Grounds: Cluskey Park, Dromiskin
- Coordinates: 53.93227°N 6.40751°W

Playing kits
Standard colours

St Joseph's GFC is a Gaelic Athletic Association (GAA) club that fields gaelic football teams in competitions organised by Louth GAA. It is based in the Louth village of Dromiskin, near the county town of Dundalk.

The club competes in the Louth Senior Championship and Division 1 of the county football Leagues.

== History ==
The club was founded in 1961 when members of the two GAA clubs in the parish of Darver and Dromiskin - Darver Volunteers and Dromiskin Unknowns - decided to amalgamate. The new club's first major success came in 1971, when St Joseph's defeated St Patrick's of Lordship in the final of the Louth Junior Championship. In 1983 they overcame Oliver Plunketts in the Louth Intermediate football final. The team progressed to the Louth Senior Football Championship final in 1984, but fell to St Fechin's by five points at the Grove in Castlebellingham.

A further Senior final appearance came in 1994, ending in a two-point defeat to Stabannon Parnells at Haggardstown after a replay. The Joe Ward Cup finally arrived in Dromiskin at the third time of asking in 1996, when St Joseph's triumphed over Stabannon Parnells at Ardee's Páirc Mhuire, by 2–11 to 1–08.

Ten more years would pass until St Joseph's won the Louth Senior Championship for a second time. On a wet day in Dundalk's Clan na Gael Park, St Joseph's defeated favourites St Patrick's, who were chasing a third title in four years and whose side contained several inter-county players. St Joseph's emerged as 2006 Louth Senior Football Champions by four points, on a scoreline of 2–07 to 0–09.

In 2025, St Joseph's won only their third ever senior-grade competition, by defeating Kilkerley Emmets in the final of the Paddy Sheelan Cup. Club trio Ben McKeown, Cormac McKeown and Pearse Grimes-Murphy were prominent in the Louth under-20 team's run to the final of the 2025 All-Ireland Under-20 Football Championship. Grimes-Murphy received the TG4 Man of the March award for his performance in Louth's semi-final defeat of Mayo.

== Honours ==
- Louth Senior Football Championship (2): 1996, 2006
- Louth Intermediate Football Championship (3): 1983, 1990, 2016
- Louth Junior Football Championship (1): 1971
- Paddy Sheelan Cup (1): 2025
- Louth Intermediate Football League (2): 1982, 1988
- Louth Minor Football Championship (3): 1994, 2009, 2010
- Louth Under-21 Football Championship (1): 1995
- Louth Junior 2A Football League (2): 1983, 2012
- Louth Junior 2 Football League Division 4B (1): 2008
- Louth Junior 2 Football League Division 5 (2): 2017, 2025
- Louth Minor Football League (2): 1993, 1994
- Louth Minor B Football Championship (1): 2004, 2018

Italics denotes combination team with St Vincent's

== Inter-county players ==
St Joseph's players who have represented Louth at senior inter-county level include:

- Jimmy McDonnell
- Ollie McDonnell
- Jimmy McDonnell Jnr
- Pat Mulligan
- Alan O'Connor
- Stephen Melia
- Danny Culligan
- David Mulligan
- Declan O'Sullivan
- David Reilly
- J.P. O'Kane
- Martin Farrelly
- Conall McCaul
- Oisín McGuinness
- John Fox
