= Kevin Mullen Shield =

Junior subsidiary league Gaelic competition

- Founded: 1978
- Title holders: Wolfe Tones (1st title)
- Most titles: Glen Emmets (5)

The Kevin Mullen Shield is an annual subsidiary league competition organised by Louth GAA for Junior grade Gaelic football clubs in County Louth.

== History ==
The competition was launched in 1978 as a junior special league, with Westerns being the inaugural winners. Local company Drogheda and Dundalk Dairies Ltd. donated a trophy to the county board for the league. In 1989 the competition gained a new sponsor in Avonmore Dairies and the Avonmore Shield was presented to that year's winners - Dowdallshill. After the 2000 death of former Seán O'Mahony's Chairman Kevin Mullen, the County Board awarded a new trophy for the league winners named in his honour.

== Format ==
Participating teams are split into groups, with the best performing sides qualifying for the knockout stages of the competition.

== Roll of honour ==
#	Team	Wins	Years won
1	Glen Emmets	5	1995, 1996, 2007, 2011, 2022
2	Lann Léire	4	1981, 2009, 2012, 2015
3	Dundalk Gaels	3	1983, 1984, 1985
3	Glyde Rangers	3	1986, 2017, 2025
3	O'Connells	3	1993, 1994, 2024
3	O'Raghallaighs	3	1988, 1998, 2001
3	Seán McDermott's	3	2000, 2005, 2013
3	St Mochta's	3	1990, 1991, 2004
9	Dowdallshill	2	1989, 2003
9	Na Piarsaigh	2	2019, 2021
9	St Kevin's	2	1987, 2018
9	Westerns	2	1978, 2006
13	Dreadnots	1	1999
13	John Mitchels	1	2002
13	Naomh Fionnbarra	1	2014
13	Naomh Máirtín	1	1980
13	Naomh Malachi	1	1979
13	Oliver Plunketts	1	2023
13	Roche Emmets	1	2016
13	Seán O'Mahony's	1	1982
13	St Bride's	1	1997
13	St Fechin's	1	2010
13	St Nicholas	1	1992
13	Stabannon Parnells	1	2008
13	Wolfe Tones	1	2026

== List of finals ==
(R) = Replay

(AET) = After Extra-Time

Year	Winner	Score	Opponent	Score
1978	Westerns	2-04	Lann Léire	0-07
1979	Naomh Malachi	2–12	Westerns	1-03
1980	Naomh Máirtín	2-07	Stabannon Parnells	0-06
1981	Lann Léire	1–11	Oliver Plunketts	0-07
1982	Seán O'Mahony's	2-09 (R)	O'Raghallaighs	0-03 (R)
1983	Dundalk Gaels	2-07	John Mitchels	2-04
1984	Dundalk Gaels	1-06 (R)	Hunterstown Rovers	0-02 (R)
1985	Dundalk Gaels	1–11	Lann Léire	0-04
1986	Glyde Rangers	-	Roche Emmets	-
1987	St Kevin's	1-06	Seán O'Mahony's	0-03
1988	O'Raghallaighs	1-09	Glyde Rangers	2-05
1989	Dowdallshill	0–11	St Kevin's	0-06
1990	St Mochta's	1-05	O'Raghallaighs	0-04
1991	St Mochta's	2-12 (R)	St Nicholas	1-09 (R)
1992	St Nicholas	3-09	Na Piarsaigh	0-03
1993	O'Connells	1-08	Glyde Rangers	0-08
1994	O'Connells	0-08	Glyde Rangers	1-04
1995	Glen Emmets	2-06	St Bride's	1-08
1996	Glen Emmets	0–10	Glyde Rangers	0-05
1997	St Bride's	0–11	Westerns	1-06
1998	O'Raghallaighs	(R)	John Mitchels	(R)
1999	Dreadnots	-	Seán McDermott's	-
2000	Seán McDermott's	1-06	O'Raghallaighs	0-07
2001	O'Raghallaighs	2–11	Westerns	1–11
2002	John Mitchels	1–19	Na Piarsaigh	1–12
2003	Dowdallshill	2–12	Glen Emmets	0-07
2004	St Mochta's	0-08	St Kevin's	0-07
2005	Seán McDermott's	0–14	Dowdallshill	0-05
2006	Westerns	4–10	St Fechin's	3-07
2007	Glen Emmets	1–10	Dowdallshill	0-09
2008	Stabannon Parnells	2-05	Glen Emmets	1-06
2009	Lann Léire	1-11 (R)	Naomh Fionnbarra	1-06 (R)
2010	St Fechin's	3-08 (R)	Seán McDermott's	1-05 (R)
2011	Glen Emmets	2–13	Naomh Fionnbarra	1-09
2012	Lann Léire	2-05	Seán McDermott's	0-08
2013	Seán McDermott's	5-05	Roche Emmets	1–11
2014	Naomh Fionnbarra	2–13	Glen Emmets	0-08
2015	Lann Léire	2–12	Glen Emmets	0-05
2016	Roche Emmets	4-20	Glen Emmets	0-06
2017	Glyde Rangers	W/O	Roche Emmets	scr.
2018	St Kevin's	2–13	Naomh Malachi	2–11
2019	Na Piarsaigh	3-08	Glen Emmets	1-03
2020	Cancelled (COVID-19)			
2021	Na Piarsaigh	1–13	Glen Emmets	1-03
2022	Glen Emmets	3-09	Na Piarsaigh	0-07
2023	Oliver Plunketts	3-08	Seán McDermott's	1-09
2024	‡ O'Connells	2-14 (AET)	Naomh Fionnbarra	1-17 (AET)
2025	Glyde Rangers	3–11	Wolfe Tones	2–11
2026	Wolfe Tones	1–16	Clan na Gael	2–12

‡ A penalty shoot-out took place after the conclusion of extra-time. O'Connells won 5-3.
