= Louth Junior 2A Football Championship =

Annual Gaelic Athletic Association competition

- Founded: 1917
- Title holders: St Mary's (8th title)
- Most titles: Cooley Kickhams (10 titles)

The Louth Junior 2A Football Championship is an annual knockout gaelic football competition organised by Louth GAA, contested by the second teams of Senior clubs in County Louth.

Formerly known as the Second Division Championship, it was renamed the Junior 2 Championship when the county football Leagues were reorganized in 1978.

== Trophy ==
The captain of the winning team is presented with the Dan McEvoy Cup. Dan "Warren" McEvoy was a member of the Tredaghs football club in Drogheda and played on the Louth team that won the 1912 All-Ireland Senior Football Championship Final.

== Finals ==
(R) = Replay

Year	Winner	Score	Opponent	Score	Winning Captain
1917	Drogheda Harps	0-05	Dromiskin Shamrocks	0-02	-
1918	Castle Emmets (Dundalk)	-	Boyne Rangers (Drogheda)	-	-
1919	Boyne Rangers	4-05	Clan na Gael	0-00	Edward Corbally
1920	Clan na Gael	4-04	Hitchestown	1-01	Peter Woods
1921	Fane Rangers (Channonrock)	1-05	Walshestown Rovers	0-00	-
1922	Stabannon Independents	(Won via objection)	Fane Rangers	-	Jack McConnon
1923	Clan na Gael	0-06	Shamrocks (Dundalk)	0-02	Peter Woods
1924	Castle Emmets	2-03	Dromiskin Unknowns	1-00	-
1925	Dromiskin Unknowns	0-06	Ballybinaby Emmets	0-00	Paddy Connor
1926	Rapparees (Dundalk)	1-02	Blues (Dundalk)	1-01	Joe Farrell
1927	Clan na Gael	1-03	Newtown Blues	1-02	James Hearty
1928	Glyde Rangers	1-01	Mountpleasant Lodge Rovers	0-00	Michael Rogan
1929	Hitchestown	1-11	Kilcurry	2-02	Tom Maguire
1930	Kilcurry	3-01	Dromiskin Unknowns	1-03	-
1931	St Magdalene's (Drogheda)	1-04	Dowdallshill	0-04	Paddy Mullen
1932	O'Connells	1-06	Dowdallshill	0-01	Peter Tuite
1933	Glyde Rangers	3-05	Cooley Kickhams	2-02	-
1934	Dowdallshill	1-04	Cannontown Emmets (Termonfeckin)	0-02	Johnny Murphy
1935	St Mochta's	2-03	Stabannon Parnells	1-02	Bernard Byrne
1936	Stabannon Parnells	1-07	Dundalk Gaels	0-02	-
1937	Woodington Rangers (Drogheda)	2-05	St Joseph's (Dundalk)	1-06	Patrick Dunne
1938	Dillonstown	3-02	Cooley Kickhams	2-02	Thomas O'Neill
1939	Dowdallshill	1-08	Darver Young Irelands	2-00	Dan Bennett
1940	Ramblers United (Termonfeckin)	1-06	Stabannon Parnells	1-05	-
1941	Stabannon Parnells	2-01	Kilkerley Emmets	0-04	John Lynch
1942	Kilkerley Emmets	1-06	Lann Léire	0-02	Petey Murphy
1943	St Dominic's (Ardee)	1-04	Cooley Kickhams	0-04	-
1944	Glyde Rangers	1-08	Stabannon Parnells	1-06	Benny Ryan
1945	St Mary's	0-04	Fane Rangers	0-01	James Burke
1946	Thomas Davis (Dunleer)	3-00	Fane Rangers	1-04	Owen Holdcroft
1947	Darver Volunteers	1-05	Cooley Kickhams	0-02	-
1948	(Declared null and void)				
1949	O'Connells	2-05	Cooley Kickhams	2-04	Peter Tuite
1950	St Colmcille's (Togher)	3-09	Mountpleasant Plunkets	1-03	Paddy Butterly
1951	Stabannon Parnells	1-06	Walshestown Rovers	0-06	Willie Byrne
1952	Walshestown Rovers	4-01	St Michael's (Clogherhead)	0-03	Amby Morgan
1953	Roche Emmets	1-04 (R)	Lann Léire	0-06 (R)	Willie Treacy
1954	Hunterstown Rovers	1-06	Lann Léire	0-04	Jack Reilly
1955	Lann Léire	1-07	Seán McDermott's	1-04	John Bowden
1956	St Mochta's	0-07	O'Connells	1-02	Tom Kerr
1957	St Kevin's	2-06	Seán McDermott's	3-02	Jim McCabe
1958	Seán McDermott's	2-03	Naomh Máirtín	1-03	Joe Osborne
1959	Naomh Máirtín	0-05	Dreadnots	0-04	Hugh Russell
1960	Mattock Rangers	2-07	Dreadnots	1-05	Paddy Geraghty
1961	St Fechin's	2-04	Dreadnots	1-03	Michael Carroll
1962	Dreadnots	2-08	Fane Rangers	1-03	Anthony Kirwan
1963	Fane Rangers	1-12	Naomh Máirtín	3-01	Harry Reilly
1964	Annaghminnon Rovers	1-09	John Mitchels	2-05	Mick Drumgoole
1965	Glen Emmets	0-08	Stabannon Parnells	0-07	Paul Carrie
1966	(Declared null and void)				
1967	John Mitchels	5-05	Stabannon Parnells	1-02	John Manning
1968	Stabannon Parnells	1-08	O'Connells	0-05	Seán Quinn
1969	St Mary's	3-01	Hunterstown Rovers	1-05	Francie Higgins
1970	St Mochta's	1-03	Hunterstown Rovers	0-03	John Byrne
1971	Lann Léire	0-07	Westerns	0-04	Bartle Faulkner
1972	Naomh Máirtín	1-11	Hunterstown Rovers	1-09	John Mullen
1973	Hunterstown Rovers	1-04	Dreadnots	0-05	Peter Taaffe
1974	Dreadnots	3-03	Westerns	2-05	Dermot Campbell
1975	Lann Léire	1-07	Westerns	1-05	Tommy Martin
1976	O'Connells	0-10	Dundalk Young Irelands	1-04	Patsy Callan
1977	Westerns	0-08	Glen Emmets	1-02	Brendan Matthews
1978	St Fechin's	0-06	Dundalk Young Irelands	0-05	Charlie Collier
1979	Roche Emmets	1-03	Mattock Rangers	0-02	Seán Quinn
1980	Cooley Kickhams	1-09	Dundalk Young Irelands	1-07	Brendan Shields
1981	Seán O'Mahony's	1-06	St Mary's	0-05	Eddie O'Leary
1982	Dundalk Young Irelands	1-09	Geraldines	0-05	Michael Bracken
1983	Glen Emmets	0-09	Dundalk Gaels	0-05	Gerry Martin
1984	Clan na Gael	1-06	Oliver Plunketts	0-02	David Neary
1985	Naomh Mhuire (Drogheda)	2-07 (R)	Na Piarsaigh	0-11 (R)	Gerard Murtagh
1986	Kilkerley Emmets	0-07	Glen Emmets	1-02	Francie Kirk
1987	St Nicholas	2-12	Na Piarsaigh	0-08	Philip Kirwan
1988	Roche Emmets	2-07	St Patrick's	1-05	Martin Shearman
1989	St Mary's	2-06 (R)	Cooley Kickhams	1-06 (R)	Bartle Landy
1990	Clan na Gael	1-10	Dundalk Young Irelands	1-03	Ciarán McKeever
1991	Cooley Kickhams	0-09	St Mary's	0-05	Aidan Shields
1992	Cooley Kickhams	1-08	Clan na Gael	1-07	Ian Murphy
1993	Clan na Gael	1-10	Roche Emmets	0-07	Donagh Rice
1994	Clan na Gael	1-12 (R)	Cooley Kickhams	2-08 (R)	Fergus Byrne
1995	Clan na Gael	1-12	Cooley Kickhams	2-07	Derek McCabe
1996	Newtown Blues	3-10	St Mary's	2-06	David Hughes
1997	St Patrick's	0-10	Cooley Kickhams	0-07	Gerry McEneaney
1998	St Patrick's	3-07	Dundalk Gaels	0-10	Séamus Rennick
1999	St Patrick's	2-12	Roche Emmets	0-04	Damien White
2000	Cooley Kickhams	1-06 (R)	Newtown Blues	0-02 (R)	Pádraig O'Neill
2001	Cooley Kickhams	1-06	Naomh Máirtín	1-04	Michael Murphy
2002	Cooley Kickhams	2-13	Newtown Blues	0-07	Michael Hanlon
2003	St Patrick's	1-08	Cooley Kickhams	0-09	James Hynes
2004	Newtown Blues	3-04	St Mary's	1-06	Tommy Costello
2005	Clan na Gael	2-09	Newtown Blues	0-12	Ciarán Campbell
2006	St Patrick's	2-06	Cooley Kickhams	0-08	Paddy White
2007	Cooley Kickhams	0-13	St Patrick's	1-07	Ronan Hanlon
2008	Naomh Malachi	2-04	Cooley Kickhams	1-06	Ronan Lynch
2009	Cooley Kickhams	0-11	St Patrick's	0-08	Declan McGuinness
2010	Newtown Blues	2-11	Naomh Máirtín	0-08	Stephen Kermode
2011	Dundalk Gaels	2-04	Cooley Kickhams	0-09	Stephen McLoughlin
2012	Naomh Máirtín	3-08	St Mary's	3-07	Thomas Sullivan
2013	St Bride's	3-11	Clan na Gael	0-09	Ruairí Kelly
2014	St Mary's	2-09	Geraldines	1-08	Shane Carroll
2015	St Mary's	2-09	St Patrick's	0-10	Paul Malone
2016	Geraldines	2-11	Naomh Máirtín	0-07	John Pepper
2017	St Mary's	2-07	St Fechin's	0-06	Wayne Matthews
2018	St Mary's	0-10	Dundalk Gaels	0-07	Mark Gorman
2019	Naomh Máirtín	4-07	St Patrick's	0-11	Connor Smyth
2020	(Cancelled - COVID-19)				
2021	Cooley Kickhams	1-11	St Mary's	0-12	Keith White
2022	Naomh Máirtín	3-16	St Patrick's	0-07	Jack McCarville
2023	Geraldines	0-14	Cooley Kickhams	1-07	Paul Clarke
2024	St Patrick's	1-07	Naomh Máirtín	0-07	Adam Finnegan
2025	Cooley Kickhams	0-09	St Patrick's	1-05	Seán White
2026	St Mary's	0-16	Naomh Máirtín	3-06	Jay Crawley
