= Louth Junior Football Championship =

Annual GAA football competition

- Founded: 1904
- Title holders: Naomh Fionnbarra (4th title)
- Most titles: Glyde Rangers (7)
- Sponsors: DKIT Sport

The Louth Junior Football Championship is an annual Gaelic Athletic Association competition, organised by Louth GAA and contested by the junior One/A grade Gaelic football clubs in County Louth, Ireland. The winner qualifies to represent the county in the Leinster Junior Club Football Championship, the winner of which then progresses to represent Leinster in the All-Ireland Junior Club Football Championship.

== Honours ==
The winning team is presented with the Christy Bellew Cup, named after the Drogheda GAA official and Killineer Larks club member who was chairman of Louth GAA in the 1920s. The cup was presented for the first time in 1949 to the victorious St Bride's team. The Junior championship itself was first contested in 1904.

The winning team is promoted to play in the following year's Louth Intermediate Football Championship.

== Finals ==
Year	Winner	Score	Opponent	Score	Winning Captain	Final Venue
1904	Tredaghs (Drogheda)	0-03	O'Mahony's (Dundalk)	0-02	Tom Kelly	Castlebellingham
1905	Dundalk Rangers	1-06 (R)	Newtown Blues	0-04 (R)	Johnny Brennan	Castlebellingham
1906	Stars (Drogheda)	1-05	O'Mahony's	1-03	Jim McKeown	Athletic Grounds
1907	Tredaghs	2-09	Dundalk Young Irelands	0-05	Denis Tenanty	Castlebellingham
1908	Dundalk Rangers	0-08	Dundalk Young Irelands	0-05	-	Athletic Grounds
1909	Geraldines	1–16	Dundalk Rangers	1-01	Joe McGuinness	Athletic Grounds
1910	Ardee St Mochta's	1-05	Dundalk Rangers	1-02	Jimmy McCann	Shamrock Lodge
1911	Funshog	1-02	Dundalk Young Irelands	0-04	James Reilly	Castlebellingham
1912	Stars	0-05	Dundalk Rangers	0-01	Tom Burke	Athletic Grounds
1913	Dundalk Rangers	3-04	Cooley Kickhams	0-00	John Norton	Athletic Grounds
1914	Stars	3-02	Hitchestown	2-03	Tom Burke	Athletic Grounds
1915	Hitchestown	0-03	Hearts of Oriel (Dundalk)	0-01	Paddy Joe Butterly	Shamrock Lodge
1916	Cooley Kickhams	2-06	Tower Emmets (Drogheda)	1-00	Josie Ferguson	Athletic Grounds
1917	Dundalk Rangers	2-07	Ardee St Mochta's	2-02	James Woods	Athletic Grounds
1918	Dundalk O'Rahillys	2-03	Eamonn Ceannts (Ardee)	0-03	Jimmy Martin	Ardee
1919	Dundalk John Dillons	2-00	Eamonn Ceannts	0-02	Atty Hanratty	Shamrock Lodge
1920	Geraldines	2-01	Con Colberts (Dundalk)	1-02	Joe Donnelly	Athletic Grounds
1921	Boyne Rangers	3-01	Larks	2-01	Edward Corbally	Shamrock Lodge
1922	Clan na Gael	1-05	Castlebellingham	0-02	Peter Garland	Castlebellingham
1923	O'Mahony's	1-02	Dundalk Rangers	1-01	Pat Carroll	Athletic Grounds
1924	Castlebellingham	1-05	Larks	1-01	Jack Lynch	Athletic Grounds
1925	O'Mahony's	2-02	Castle Emmets (Dundalk)	2-01	Jack Callan	Athletic Grounds
1926	Con Colberts	1-03	St Dominic's (Dundalk)	0-04	Willie Lawless	Athletic Grounds
1927	Unknowns (Dromiskin)	4-03	Cooley Kickhams	0-03	Paddy Connor	Athletic Grounds
1928	Castlebellingham	1-04	St Mary's	1-02	-	Gaelic Grounds
1929	Glyde Rangers	2-03	Clan na Gael	1-04	Jimmy Kelly	The Grove
1930	Clan na Gael	2-05	Castle Emmets	2-04	Peter Garland	Athletic Grounds
1931	St Bride's	1-04	Owen Roe's (Drogheda)	1-02	Peter Byrne	The Grove
1932	Owen Roe's	2-02	Dundalk Gaels	1-04	Jimmy Mullen	Athletic Grounds
1933	Dundalk Gaels	4-02	Darver Young Irelands	0-08	Arty Connolly	The Grove
1934	Cooley Kickhams	7–10	St Joseph's (Dundalk, now defunct)	1-02	Jim Murphy	Athletic Grounds
1935	Dowdallshill	2-06 (After 2nd replay)	St Magdalene's (Drogheda)	3-01	Jim Tiernan	Gaelic Grounds
1936	Clan na Gael	1-05	Geraldines	0-01	Joe Hearty	Athletic Grounds
1937	Dundalk Young Irelands	4-05 (R)	Darver Young Irelands	2-04 (R)	Nick Mulligan	Athletic Grounds
1938	Darver Young Irelands	2-06	St Bride's	2-04	Jim Cluskey	Athletic Grounds
1939	Geraldines	2-04	St Bride's	1-03	Tommy Thornton	Athletic Grounds
1940	St Bride's	1-06	Seán O'Mahony's	1-04	Jack Treanor	Athletic Grounds
1941	Seán O'Mahony's	2-07	Wolfe Tones	0-04	Anthony Rogers	The Grove
1942	St Magdalene's	2-06	Geraldines	2-05	Ollie Halpin	Athletic Grounds
1943	Stabannon Parnells	1-03	Lann Léire	1-02	John Lynch	Athletic Grounds
1944	St Mochta's	5-04	Round Towers (Dromiskin)	1-03	John Byrne	Athletic Grounds
1945	Owen Roe's	4-01	Hunterstown	1-04	Oliver Mullen	Gaelic Grounds
1946	Kilkerley Emmets	4-04	Hunterstown	0-04	Tom O'Hare	Athletic Grounds
1947	Cooley Kickhams	2-04 (R)	Oliver Plunketts	0-03 (R)	Mick Callaghan	Athletic Grounds
1948	Glyde Rangers	1-06	Parnells (Drogheda)	0-05	Peter Woods	Athletic Grounds
1949	St Bride's	2-06	Kilkerley Emmets	0-04	Harry Devine	Athletic Grounds
1950	Dundalk Young Irelands	2-01	Dowdallshill	0-06	Harry Cumiskey	Athletic Grounds
1951	Dowdallshill	0-06, 4-04 (R)	Oliver Plunketts	1-03, 1-08 (R)	Owen Rogers	Páirc Mhuire
1952	Naomh Mhuire (Drogheda)	4-04	Kilkerley Emmets	2-01	Jim Gavin	Páirc Mhuire
1953	Walshestown Rovers	2-05	Oliver Plunketts	0-03	Larry Fay	Páirc Mhuire
1954	Clan na Gael	1-06	Glyde Rangers	1-02	Paddy Dixon	The Grove
1955	Unknowns	2-05	Newtown Blues	2-03	Paddy Dooley	Páirc Mhuire
1956	Darver Volunteers	0–12	Roche Emmets	1-07	Michael McDonnell	Páirc Mhuire
1957	Roche Emmets	0-06	Glyde Rangers	0-03	Jim McArdle	Páirc Mhuire
1958	Newtown Blues	1–11	St Bride's	1-05	Jim Judge	Páirc Mhuire
1959	Hunterstown	0-09	St Bride's	0-05	Ollie Reilly	Páirc Mhuire
1960	St Patrick's	3–11	Parnells	0-02	Jim Byrne	Páirc Mhuire
1961	Mattock Rangers	0–11	Geraldines	2-04	Ollie Geraghty	Páirc Mochta
1962	Glyde Rangers	1–11	St Bride's	0-06	Joe Mackin	Páirc Mochta
1963	O'Raghallaighs	1–10	O'Connells	1-06	Muckle McKeown	Páirc Mhuire
1964	Cooley Kickhams	0-08	Naomh Fionnbarra	0-07	John Woods	St Brigid's Park
1965	St Fechin's	1-05	Seán McDermott's	1-04	John Crosbie	Páirc Mhuire
1966	Geraldines	0-08	Seán McDermott's	1-01	Frank Lynch	Knockbridge
1967	St Bride's	1-07	St Kevin's	1-05	Gerry Kelly	Páirc Mochta
1968	St Kevin's	2-08	Fane Rangers (Channonrock)	0-05	Benny Grogan	Knockbridge
1969	Glyde Rangers	0-06	Seán McDermott's	0-03	Gerry Sheridan	Páirc Mochta
1970	Dowdallshill	1–10	St Patrick's	1-07	Billy Curran	Páirc Mochta
1971	St Joseph's	1–11	St Patrick's	0-05	Éamon Daly	Knockbridge
1972	St Patrick's	1-05	St Mochta's	0-03	Seán Hanlon	Knockbridge
1973	Seán O'Mahony's	3-09	Naomh Fionnbarra	3-06	John Finnegan	The Grove
1974	Seán McDermott's	0-07	St Mary's	0-05	Jim McLoughlin	Gaelic Grounds
1975	St Mochta's	0-09	St Fechin's	0-04	Don Neary	Páirc Mhuire
1976	St Fechin's	2-09	Kilkerley Emmets	0-09	Con Sands	Páirc Uí Mhuirí
1977	Dundalk Young Irelands	1–12	Oliver Plunketts	0-06	Gerry Nixon	Knockbridge
1978	Naomh Mhuire	2-06	Lann Léire	1-07	Paul McKenna	The Grove
1979	Naomh Malachi	0-08	Naomh Máirtín	1-01	Brendan Begley	Cluskey Park
1980	Naomh Máirtín	1–14	Westerns	1-07	James Mullen	The Grove
1981	Oliver Plunketts	3–10	Lann Léire	1-08	Frank Taaffe	Knockbridge
1982	Seán O'Mahony's	1-08	O'Connells	0-07	Eddie O'Leary	Knockbridge
1983	O'Connells	1–10, 2-04 (R)	Lann Léire	1–10, 0-05 (R)	Gerry Fox	Knockbridge
1984	Oliver Plunketts	2–11	Dundalk Gaels	1-07	Mickey Matthews	Cluskey Park
1985	Lann Léire	2-09	John Mitchels	1-06	Aidan King	Cluskey Park
1986	Dundalk Gaels	0-06	Hunterstown	0-04	Kevin Barry	The Grove
1987	Hunterstown	2-02	Seán O'Mahony's	0-06	Mickey Durnin	Páirc Mochta
1988	O'Connells	0-06	St Kevin's	0-02	Gerry Fox	Knockbridge
1989	St Kevin's	1-05, 1-07 (R)	St Mochta's	1-05, 1-03 (R)	John McGrane	The Grove
1990	Glyde Rangers	2-04, 1-13 (R) A.E.T	St Mochta's	0–10, 1-08 (R)	Paddy Kelly	Páirc Mhuire
1991	O'Raghallaighs	0–12	St Mochta's	0-09	David O'Neill	Páirc Uí Mhuirí
1992	John Mitchels	1-04	Glyde Rangers	0-06	Derek Breagy	McGeough Park
1993	Na Piarsaigh	2-06	Glyde Rangers	0–10	Paul Smyth	McGeough Park
1994	St. Nicholas	2-05	Glyde Rangers	0-08	Tim Murphy	The Grove
1995	St Mochta's	1-08, 1-12 (R)	O'Raghallaighs	1-08, 0-05 (R)	Anthony Meegan	The Grove
1996	Glyde Rangers	1-09, 1-07 (R)	Oliver Plunketts	1-09, 1-05 (R)	Michael McKeever	Knockbridge
1997	Glen Emmets	3–13	Westerns	2–12	Shane Black	Páirc Mhuire
1998	John Mitchels	1-08	St Bride's	0-09	Des Halpenny	Páirc Mochta
1999	Dreadnots	1-09	O'Connells	2-05	Gerard Byrne	Páirc Uí Mhuirí
2000	Annaghminnon Rovers	1–16	Glen Emmets	3-08	Brendan Pepper	Tallanstown
2001	O'Raghallaighs	1–12	Dundalk Young Irelands	0-07	Kevin King	Cluskey Park
2002	Na Piarsaigh	0–13	Dowdallshill	1-08	Barry Magill	Clan na Gael Park
2003	Dowdallshill	3-05	Westerns	3-04	Ciarán O'Callaghan	Páirc Mochta
2004	St Mochta's	2–14	Glen Emmets	2–10	Gervaise Marron	Páirc Mhuire
2005	Dowdallshill	1-08	St Kevin's	0–10	Vincent McKevitt	The Grove
2006	St Kevin's	1–10	Westerns	1-05	Mark Boylan	St Brigid's Park
2007	Dundalk Young Irelands	1-07	St Mochta's	0-07	Aaron Rogers	Clan na Gael Park
2008	St. Nicholas	1-07, 1-10 (R)	Lann Léire	0–10, 0-08 (R)	Shane Downey	McGeough Park-Gaelic Grounds (R)
2009	St Mochta's	0–15	St Fechin's	0–12	Gervaise Marron	McGeough Park
2010	Naomh Fionnbarra	3-05	Seán McDermott's	0–11	Bernard Osborne	The Grove
2011	St Fechin's	2–16	Glen Emmets	1-09	Harry McArdle	Páirc Uí Mhuirí
2012	Glen Emmets	1-07	Lann Léire	0-09	Stephen Healy	The Grove
2013	Hunterstown	3–16	Naomh Fionnbarra	1-05	Pádraig Matthews	Páirc Uí Mhuirí
2014	Oliver Plunketts	2-06	Glen Emmets	0-09	Seán Brassil	Stabannon
2015	Naomh Fionnbarra	2-20	Roche Emmets	0-07	Hugh McGrane & Darren McConnon	Páirc Uí Mhuirí
2016	St Kevin's	2-09	Glen Emmets	0–14	Liam Boylan	The Grove
2017	Glen Emmets	1–12	Glyde Rangers	0–14	Ronan Grufferty	The Grove
2018	Dundalk Young Irelands	1-04	Glyde Rangers	0-06	Cian Ó'Náraigh	St Brigid's Park
2019	Roche Emmets	1–11, 2-07 (R)	Glyde Rangers	1–11, 0-10 (R)	Liam Dawe	Clan na Gael Park-The Grove (R)
2020	Naomh Fionnbarra	3-07	Lann Léire	2-07	Hugh McGrane & Darren McConnon	Darver
2021	Glen Emmets	3-07	John Mitchels	1-08	Conor Grimes	Páirc Uí Mhuirí
2022	Stabannon Parnells	0–10, 2-10 (R)	Glyde Rangers	1-07, 0-08 (R)	Thomas Campbell	The Grove
2023	Glyde Rangers	1–13	Naomh Fionnbarra	1-08	Brian Duffy	Stabannon
2024	Wolfe Tones	2–10	John Mitchels	2-02	Dwayne Leavy	Páirc Uí Mhuirí
2025	Oliver Plunketts	2–10, 1-13 (R)	Glyde Rangers	1–13, 1-11 (R)	Dean Carolan	The Grove
2026	Naomh Fionnbarra	1-8, 1-10 (R)	Dundalk Young Irelands	0-11, 0-11 (R)	Conor Osborne & Josh Crosbie	Tallanstown

== See also ==
- Mulligan, Fr.John (1984). The GAA in Louth - An Historical Record.
- Mulligan, Fr.John (2000). The GAA in Louth - An Historical Record (updated).
