= Kilkerley Emmets GFC =

Louth-based Gaelic games club

Kilkerley Emmets
- Emmití Chill Choirle
- Founded: 1940
- County: Louth
- Colours: Yellow and Blue
- Grounds: Páirc Chill Choirle, Tankardsrock, Kilkerley, County Louth
- Coordinates: 54.00929°N 6.46716°W

Playing kits
Standard colours

Kilkerley Emmets GFC is a Gaelic Athletic Association (GAA) club that fields gaelic football teams in competitions organised by Louth GAA.

As of 2023, the club competes in the Louth Intermediate Championship and Division 2 of the county football Leagues. Former Louth goalkeeper Seán Connor is the manager of the senior team.

Situated in an area of north Louth that contains several GAA clubs, Kilkerley's local rivals are considered to be Roche Emmets and St Bride's.

== History ==
The club was founded in 1940 and is located in the townland of Tankardsrock in Kilkerley parish, four miles from Dundalk town centre.

The Emmets enjoyed a significant period of success in the late 1970s, winning the Junior 1 League in 1977 and then beating Dreadnots in the final of the 1978 Louth Intermediate Football Championship. The jump from junior to senior football in the space of two years was made possible in no small part by being able to call on the services of county players J.P. O'Kane and the Lennon brothers, Terry and Pat.

More silverware was won in 1980 when Kilkerley defeated Cooley Kickhams 1–09 to 2–05 in the final of the Cardinal O'Donnell Cup to claim their first ever senior trophy. Later that year, forward Pat Lennon was tragically killed in a car accident.

In 1982 the club contested the final of the Louth Senior Football Championship for the first time, but lost to Geraldines by six points.

They returned to the county final in 1986, this time losing narrowly by 3–05 to 2–07, against a strong Newtown Blues team that completed a clean sweep of senior competitions.

The club's third appearance in the county decider in 1999 was a forgettable one, as they succumbed to an eleven-point hammering at the hands of Stabannon Parnells in Haggardstown.

In December 2014, Shane Lennon, full-forward for Louth in the 2010 Leinster Senior Football Championship Final, announced his retirement from inter-county football. He departed as the all-time record goal scorer for his county.

== Honours ==
- Cardinal O'Donnell Cup (1): 1980
- ACC Cup (1): 1988
- Louth Intermediate Football Championship (2): 1978, 2015
- Louth Intermediate Football League (1): 2002
- Dealgan Milk Products/Paddy Sheelan Shield (1): 1978, 2019
- Louth Junior Football Championship (1): 1946
- Louth Junior A Football League (1): 1977
- Louth Minor Football Championship (1): § 1977
- Louth Minor Football League (1): ‡ 2019
- Louth Minor 'B' Football Championship (1): ‡ 2017
- Louth Junior 2A Football Championship (1): 1942, 1986
- Louth Junior 2A Football League (3): 1942, 1981, 1989
- Louth Junior 2 Football League (Division 4B) (1): 2015
- Louth Junior 2 Football League (Division 4C) (1): 2013
- Dundalk Junior League (4): 1951, 1975, 1983, 1987

‡ Shared with Naomh Malachi

§ Shared with Naomh Malachi and Roche Emmets

== Inter-county players ==
Kilkerley Emmets players who have represented Louth at senior inter-county level include:

- Ned McEnteggart
- Terry Lennon
- Paidín O'Hare
- Jim Lynch
- J.P. O'Kane
- Pat Lennon
- Ray Quinn
- Peter O'Hare
- Vincent Litchfield
- Michael Fegan
- Peter Kirk
- Séamus Quigley
- Barry Clarke
- Colm McGuinness
- Shane Lennon
- Cathal Bellew
- Tadgh McEneaney
