= Naomh Fionnbarra GAA (Louth) =

Louth-based Gaelic games club

Naomh Fionnbarra
- Founded: 1957
- County: Louth
- Nickname: The Barrs, The Finbarrs
- Colours: Green and Gold
- Grounds: John Markey Park, Ballynagassan, Togher
- Coordinates: 53.87212°N 6.34359°W

Playing kits
Standard colours

Naomh Fionnbarra GAA is a Gaelic Athletic Association (GAA) club that fields gaelic football teams in competitions organised by Louth GAA. It is located in the townland of Ballynagassan, part of Togher parish.

As of 2026, the club competes in the Louth Junior Football Championship and Division 3A of the county football Leagues. Brendan Grant is the manager of the senior men's team.

== History ==
The club was founded in 1957 when St Colmcille's of Togher and neighbouring club Walshestown Rovers amalgamated.

Clinching the Old Gaels Cup in 1997 as Intermediate League winners ensured that Naomh Fionnbarra would play Senior football for the first time.

Naomh Fionnbarra's victory in the replayed final of the 2001 Louth Intermediate Football Championship was their most significant to date, as the 0–15 to 1–08 win against Seán McDermott's gave the club a first ever adult Championship title. The club has since won the Louth Junior Football Championship 4 times.

Naomh Fionnbarra Ladies' football team won the 2011 Louth Junior Championship and the Louth Intermediate Championship in 2022.

The club shares pitches and facilities with fellow parish side St Anne's Camogie club.

== Honours ==
- Louth Intermediate Football Championship (1): 2001
- Louth Intermediate Football League (3): 1980, 1983, 1997
- Dealgan Milk Products Shield/Grogan Cup (3): 1981, 1982, 2003
- Louth Junior Football Championship (4): 2010, 2015, 20202026
- Louth Junior A Football League (6): 1960, 1963, 1971, 2008, 2011, 2014
- Kevin Mullen Shield (1): 2014
- Louth Junior 2A Football League (1): 1968
- Louth Junior 2 Football League (Division 4B) (1): 1997
- Louth Junior 2 Football League (Division 4C) (1): 2012
- Louth Minor Football Championship (2): # 1982, 1985
- Louth Minor B Football Championship (3): § 2011, ‡ 2015, 2023

# Shared with Baile Philib (Dunleer parish combination team)

§ Shared with St Kevin's

‡ Shared with Lann Léire

== Inter-county players ==
Naomh Fionnbarra players who have represented Louth at senior inter-county level include:

- Peter Shevlin
- David Reilly
- John Doyle
- John Osborne
- Nigel Shevlin
- Hugh Osborne
- William Woods
