= St Bride's GFC =

Louth-based Gaelic games club

- Naomh Bríd CPG
- Founded: 1927
- County: Louth
- Nickname: The Wee Brides
- Colours: Red and White
- Grounds: Páirc an Chuinnigh, Millpark, Knockbridge
- Coordinates: 53.96633°N 6.47782°W

Playing kits
Standard colours

St Bride's GFC is a Gaelic Athletic Association (GAA) club that fields gaelic football teams in competitions organised by Louth GAA. It is based in the County Louth village of Knockbridge.

As of 2023, the club competes in the Louth Senior Championship and Division 1 of the county football Leagues. Gary Mallon is the manager of the senior team.

== History ==
The club was founded in 1927. Their sole success in the Louth Senior Football Championship came in 1943, when they defeated Cooley Kickhams in the county final by 3–09 to 2–03.

== Honours ==
- Louth Senior Football Championship (1): 1943
- Cardinal O'Donnell Cup (1): 1968
- Louth Senior Football League Division 1B (1): 2001
- Louth Intermediate Football Championship (1): 2020
- Louth Intermediate Football League (3): 1986, 1999, 2017
- Old Gaels Cup (1): 1975
- Louth Junior Football Championship (4): 1931, 1940, 1949, 1967
- Louth Junior A Football League (3): 1937, 1959, 1995
- Avonmore Shield (1): 1997
- Louth Minor Football Championship (1): 2011
- Louth Minor B Football Championship (1): 2001
- Louth Under-21 Football Championship (1): ‡ 1983, 2000, 2013
- Louth Junior 2A Football Championship (1): 2013
- Louth Junior 2A Football League (4): 1964, 1967, 1974, 2016
- Louth Junior 2 Football League (Division 4C) (3): 1995, 1996, 1997
- Louth Junior 2 Football League (Division 4B) (1): 2013

‡ Shared with Geraldines

== Inter-county players ==
St Bride's players who have represented Louth at senior inter-county level include:

- Harry Devine
- Michael 'Huckle' Byrne
- Séamus Kirk
- Terry Lennon
- Pete Lennon
- Anthony Hoey
- Gay Grehan
- Aaron Hoey
- Ray Kelly
- David Mackin
- Patrick Reilly
- Seán Marry
