= St Kevin's GAA (Louth) =

Louth-based Gaelic games club

St Kevin's
- Naomh Caoimhín CLG
- Founded: 1948
- County: Louth
- Colours: Red and Black
- Grounds: Páirc Chaoimhín Naofa, Philipstown, Dunleer
- Coordinates: 53.82195°N 6.46866°W

Playing kits
Standard colours

St Kevin's GAA is a Gaelic Athletic Association (GAA) club that fields teams in competitions organised by Louth GAA. It is located in the townland of Philipstown, just over 2 miles from the town of Dunleer in mid-Louth.

As of 2024, the club competes in the Louth Intermediate Championship and Division 2 of the county football Leagues.

Fellow Dunleer parish club Lann Léire are local rivals.

In November 2023 Paddy Carr was announced as the club's new senior football team manager.

Ganson Building & Civil Engineering Ltd., a construction company co-founded by former St Kevin's player David Rogers, has been appointed to build the new Louth GAA stadium in Dundalk. Ganson previously built the Louth GAA Centre of Excellence in Darver.

Barry Brennan of St Kevin's was made Honorary President of Louth GAA at the end of 2025.

== History ==
The club was founded in 1948. By winning the Louth Junior Football Championship in 1968, the St Kevin's reached the Senior ranks of Louth football for the first time.

The club has finished runner-up twice in the final of the Louth Intermediate Football Championship. Firstly in 2000 to Dreadnots and then in 2022, when defeated by Cooley Kickhams.

In Ladies' football, St Kevin's compete at Senior Championship level and won the 2022 Division 2 League title.

St Kevin's also field Camogie teams at adult and juvenile levels.

== Honours ==
- Louth Intermediate Football League (1): 1990
- Dealgan Milk Products Shield (2): 1990, 1997
- Louth Junior Football Championship (4): 1968, 1989, 2006, 2016
- Louth Junior A Football League (4): 1965, 1966, 1967, 1988
- Drogheda and Dundalk Dairies/Kevin Mullen Shield (2): 1987, 2018
- Kevin Mullen Plate (1): 2012
- Louth Minor Football Championship (1): ‡ 1982
- Louth Minor 'B' Football Championship (2): ‡ 2011, § 2014
- Louth Junior 2A Football Championship (1): 1957
- Louth Junior 2B Football Championship (1): 1996
- Louth Junior 2C Football Championship (1): 2019
- Louth Junior 2 Football League (Division 4D) (1): 2015

‡ Shared with Naomh Fionnbarra

§ Shared with Baile Talún

== Inter-county players ==
St Kevin's players who have represented Louth at inter-county level include:

- Dickie Kieran
- Benny Grogan
- Con Sands
- John Boylan
- Stephen Matthews
- Paul Brennan
- Cian Callan
- TJ Doheny
- Evan Maher
