= Seán O'Mahony's GFC =

Louth-based Gaelic games club

Seán O'Mahony's
- CLG Seán Ó Mathúna
- Founded: 1938
- County: Louth
- Nickname: O'Mahony's
- Colours: Green and gold
- Grounds: Point Road, Dundalk
- Coordinates: 54.006982°N 6.375532°W

Playing kits
Standard colours

Senior Club Championships
	All Ireland	Leinster champions	Louth champions
Football:	-	-	1

Seán O'Mahony's GFC is a Gaelic football club that fields teams in competitions organized by Louth GAA. It is located in the 'Quay' area of Dundalk, County Louth, near the town's port. The clubrooms and pitch are adjacent to the Navvy Bank, a popular local landmark which affords walkers picturesque views of the Cooley Mountains. As of 2025, the club competes in the Louth Intermediate Football Championship and Division 1 of the County football Leagues.

== History ==
The present-day club was established in 1938 and named after the Irish republican Seán O'Mahony.

An earlier manifestation of the club was based in the Quay area during the early 1900s. Known simply as 'O'Mahony's', the original club was formed in 1903. O'Mahony's were runners-up in the final of the inaugural Louth Junior Football Championship in 1904 and lost another final two years later. They amalgamated with fellow Dundalk side John Dillons in 1907, but re-emerged on the county scene in the 1920s, winning two Junior Championships in 1923 and 1925. The club then disappeared from Louth football shortly afterwards.

A group of committed gaelic football enthusiasts started the new club in 1938, adding the prefix 'Seán'. These men included Johnny Tuite, Dermot Keelan, Jack Callan, Tom Reynolds and Jimmy Corr. Andy Rogers from Blackrock, a former inter-county referee and long-serving County Board vice-Chairman, helped procure a training pitch. It did not take long for the Quay men to achieve success. The MacArdle Cup was annexed in 1939, when the club beat Ramblers United of Termonfeckin in the final of the Louth Junior League. The panel was strikingly youthful, with the starting fifteen that lined out against Ramblers having an average age of just eighteen. The MacArdle Cup was retained in 1939 with the defeat of Drogheda's Owen Roes in the decider. The Seán O'Mahony's first Championship title followed soon after in 1941, when the club triumphed over Wolfe Tones in the final at the Grove, on a scoreline of 2–7 to 0–4.

A period of decline followed in the mid-1950s. The club folded and did not participate in any further football activities until 1962, when a committee composed of local Councillor Peter Duffy and Kevin Mullen among others, reorganized the club. The arrival of Cumann Peile na nÓg in the 1970s introduced children from the Quay area to gaelic football, many of whom would go on to represent the Seán O'Mahony's at adult level. Dundalk Urban District Council assisted the further development of the club in 1978, by providing a field on the Point Road which would become the O'Mahony's permanent home.

In 2002 Paddy McMahon, a grandson of Andy Rogers and manager of the club's 1998 Intermediate Championship-winning side, became the first member of Seán O'Mahony's to hold the office of Louth County Board Chairman. His three-year term included the establishment of the Darver project, building a training and development Centre of Excellence for Louth GAA.

A period of three years in the 2010s saw the club achieve unprecedented success. This started in 2014, when they beat St Fechin's in the Intermediate Championship final. Going on to represent Louth in the Leinster Intermediate Club Football Championship, the O'Mahony's went all the way to the final and became Provincial champions with a win over Ballinlough of Meath.

In 2015 the club's momentum continued. They reached the final of the Louth Senior Football Championship for the first time ever, losing by eight points to St Patrick's. The following year they again reached the final, this time facing St Mary's of Ardee on 2 October. A tight match at the Drogheda Gaelic Grounds ended with a late goal to seal a historic win for the Quay men, by a score of 1–11 to 1–09.

Another hard-fought Provincial campaign lay ahead in the 2016–17 All-Ireland Senior Club Football Championship. O'Mahony's began by defeating Baltinglass and then overcame Newbridge Sarsfields at the quarter-final stage. Semi-final opponents Rhode of Offaly proved too tough an obstacle, defeating the O'Mahony's 0–12 to 1–05 in December at Drogheda.

The 2016 team that won the Joe Ward Cup was: Kevin Brennan, Kurt Murphy (0–1), Ronan Byrne (0–1), Mickey Clarke, Liam Dullaghan (0–2), John O'Brien, Barry O'Brien, Conor Martin, Shane Brennan (Capt.), Conor Finnegan (0–6, 5f), Ben McLaughlin, Stephen Fisher, Stephen Kilcoyne (0–1), Conor Crawley (1–0), Johnny Connolly. Subs Used: Niall McLaughlin, David Dowling, Barry Mackin.

== Notable players ==
- Peter Corr – considered one of the best forwards to play for Louth. Member of the 1941 Junior Championship team. Won All-Ireland Minor Football Championship with Louth in 1940. Runner-up in 1941 Minor Final. Scored 1–8 in 1943 Leinster Senior Final against Laois. Later pursued a soccer career in England and was capped at international level.
- David Crawley – member of 1998 Intermediate Championship-winning side. Captained Dundalk in 2002 FAI Cup final and won League of Ireland medals with Shelbourne. His brother Willie also played with Dundalk and the Louth minor team.
- John O'Brien – played for Louth at underage and senior level. Made twenty-five Championship appearances for his county, most notably in the 2010 Leinster Final. His uncle Barry played for Louth in the Eighties.

== Honours ==
- Louth Senior Football Championship (1): 2016
- Louth Intermediate Football Championship (3): 1992, 1998, 2014
- Louth Junior Football Championship (3): 1941, 1973, 1982
- Leinster Intermediate Club Football Championship (1): 2014
- Louth Intermediate Football League (1): 2005
- Intermediate Football League Division 2B (2): 2002, 2004
- Louth Junior A Football League (4): 1939, 1940, 1948, 1987
- Paddy Sheelan Shield (1): 2013
- Drogheda and Dundalk Dairies Shield (1): 1982
- Louth Junior 2A Football Championship (1): 1981
- Louth Junior 2B Football Championship (1): 2002
- Louth Junior 2 Football League (Division 4C) (1): 2002
- Louth Junior 2 Football League (Division 5) (1): 2021

== Trivia ==
Several players throughout the lifetime of the club have been members of the Army's 27 Infantry Battalion, based at nearby Aiken Barracks. In recognition of the service to the GAA of former O'Mahony's stalwarts Andy Rogers and Kevin Mullen, the County Board runs football competitions named in their honour.
