= Glen Emmets GFC =

Louth-based Gaelic games club

Glen Emmets
- Emmití an Ghleanna
- Founded: 1958
- County: Louth
- Colours: Green and Red
- Grounds: Cusack Park, Tullyallen, County Louth
- Coordinates: 53.73856°N 6.42345°W

Playing kits
Standard colours

Glen Emmets GFC is a Gaelic Football club located in Tullyallen, County Louth, Ireland, close to the town of Drogheda, which fields teams in competitions organised by Louth GAA.

Founded in 1958, the club competes in the Louth Intermediate Championship and Division 2 of the county football Leagues. Ray Lambe is the manager of the club's senior team.

== Honours ==
- Louth Junior Football Championship (4): 1997, 2012, 2017, 2021
- Ladies Louth Junior Football Championship (1): 2022
- Louth Junior A Football League (4): 2004, 2016, 2021, 2022
- Ladies Football League Division 3 (1): 2022
- Avonmore/Kevin Mullen Shield (5): 1995, 1996, 2007, 2011, 2022
- Louth Junior 2A Football Championship (2): 1965, 1983
- Louth Junior 2A Football League (2): 1965, 1976
- Louth Junior 2 Football League (Division 4C) (1): 2006
- Louth Minor B Football Championship (1): 2022

== Inter-county players ==
- Conor Grimes - Forward. Tullyallen native who captained the side that won the 2021 Louth Junior Championship. Made his Senior inter-county Championship debut in 2014. A key member of the county team that has reached the 2023 Leinster Senior Football Championship final under the management of Mickey Harte.
- Aoife Russell - Wing-back.
