= Cardinal O'Donnell Cup =

Senior league Gaelic competition

- Founded: 1927
- No. of teams: 12
- Title holders: St Mary's (14th title)
- Most titles: Cooley Kickhams (15)
- Sponsors: John O'Neill Sand and Gravel

The Cardinal O'Donnell Cup is an annual senior league competition organised by Louth GAA for the Division 1 teams in Gaelic football in County Louth.

== Format ==
All 12 teams play each other once, with the top four traditionally qualifying for the semi-final stage. The semi-final victors then face off in the final of the competition. There is also relegation to Division 2 for the worst-performing team(s).

== Trophy ==
The winning team is presented with the Cardinal O'Donnell Cup, named after Patrick O'Donnell, who was Catholic Archbishop of Armagh and Primate of All Ireland from 1924 until his death in October 1927.

The trophy, which was donated to the County Board of Louth GAA by the Cardinal in 1926, is a replica of the Ardagh Chalice. The inaugural winners of the competition were Wolfe Tones of Drogheda.

== Roll of Honour ==
#	Team	Wins	Years won
1	Cooley Kickhams	15	1936, 1937, 1966, 1967, 1970, 1972, 1974, 1976, 1979, 1983, 1989, 2004, 2006, 2007, 2008
2	Newtown Blues	14	1933, 1962, 1963, 1964, 1965, 1969, 1977, 1981, 1984, 1986, 2005, 2010, 2018, 2022
2	St Mary's	14	1947, 1949, 1952, 1953, 1954, 1955, 1956, 1971, 1975, 1991, 2002, 2021, 2024, 2026
4	Clan na Gael	10	1929, 1982, 1987, 1990, 1992, 1993, 1994, 1996, 1997, 2000
5	Dundalk Young Irelands	6	1938, 1939, 1940, 1941, 1948, 1978
5	St Patrick's	6	1999, 2003, 2009, 2012, 2013, 2014
7	Stabannon Parnells	5	1945, 1950, 1951, 1995, 1998
7	Wolfe Tones	5	1927, 1928, 1931, 1934, 1935
9	Roche Emmets	4	1958, 1960, 1961, 2001
10	Dundalk Gaels	3	1942, 1943, 1944
11	Dreadnots	2	1988, 2016
11	Mattock Rangers	2	2011, 2015
11	Naomh Máirtín	2	2017, 2019
11	Oliver Plunketts	2	1957, 1959
11	St Mochta's	2	2023, 2025
16	O'Raghallaighs	1	1973
16	St Fechin's	1	1985
16	St Bride's	1	1968
16	Kilkerley Emmets	1	1980
16	Glyde Rangers	1	1932
16	Boyne Rangers	1	1930

== Finals ==
‡ winners also won Louth Senior Football Championship that year

§ Title awarded to St Mary's after objection. Oliver Plunketts fielded an ineligible player

Year	Winner	Score	Opponent	Score	Final Venue
1927	Wolfe Tones	1-07	Gardaí	0-06	Gaelic Grounds
1928	Wolfe Tones	0-06	Boyne Rangers (Drogheda)	0-01	Gaelic Grounds
1929	Clan na Gael	3-02	Wolfe Tones	0-03	Athletic Grounds
1930	‡ Boyne Rangers	4-03	Wolfe Tones	1-02	Gaelic Grounds
1931	‡ Wolfe Tones	2-06	Newtown Blues	1-06	Gaelic Grounds
1932	Glyde Rangers	2-03	Newtown Blues	1-01	Gaelic Grounds
1933	‡ Newtown Blues	1-04	Glyde Rangers	1-02	Athletic Grounds
1934	Wolfe Tones	0-07	Newtown Blues	0-03	Gaelic Grounds
1935	Wolfe Tones	1-04	St Magdalene's (Drogheda)	1-03	Gaelic Grounds
1936	Cooley Kickhams	3-06	Wolfe Tones	1-01	Athletic Grounds
1937	Cooley Kickhams	1-06	Wolfe Tones	1-04	Gaelic Grounds
1938	‡ Dundalk Young Irelands	2-05	Wolfe Tones	1-03	Athletic Grounds
1939	Dundalk Young Irelands	3-03	Darver Young Irelands	1-03	Athletic Grounds
1940	‡ Dundalk Young Irelands	1-05	Glyde Rangers	1-03	The Grove
1941	‡ Dundalk Young Irelands	3-07	Darver Young Irelands	1-01	The Grove
1942	‡ Dundalk Gaels	1-06	St Bride's	1-03	Athletic Grounds
1943	Dundalk Gaels	1-06	St Bride's	1-05	Athletic Grounds
1944	Dundalk Gaels	0-07	St Magdalene's	0-02	Athletic Grounds
1945	Stabannon Parnells	0-05	St Magdalene's	0-04	Athletic Grounds
1946	Cancelled				
1947	St Mary's	w/o	Clan na Gael	scr.	Gaelic Grounds
1948	Dundalk Young Irelands	2-10	St Mary's	2-05	Athletic Grounds
1949	St Mary's	3-03	Dundalk Young Irelands	1-05	Páirc Mhuire
1950	Stabannon Parnells	2-03	Dundalk Gaels	1-00	The Grove
1951	Stabannon Parnells	2-07	Dundalk Young Irelands	0-07	Stabannon
1952	St Mary's	3-09	St Magdalene's	2-03	Gaelic Grounds
1953	St Mary's	-	A Final was not played	-	-
1954	§ St Mary's	1-07	Oliver Plunketts	1-08	Gaelic Grounds
1955	‡ St Mary's	2-08	Stabannon Parnells	1-04	Athletic Grounds
1956	‡ St Mary's	0-06	Dundalk Young Irelands	0-05	Athletic Grounds
1957	‡ Oliver Plunketts	1-04	Dundalk Young Irelands	0-05	Knockbridge
1958	‡ Roche Emmets	2-07	Darver Volunteers	0-04	Knockbridge
1959	Oliver Plunketts	0-06	Roche Emmets	0-03	Páirc Mhuire
1960	Roche Emmets	3-04	Newtown Blues	1-09	Knockbridge
1961	Roche Emmets	1-10	Newtown Blues	1-05	St Brigid's Park
1962	‡ Newtown Blues	1-15	Roche Emmets	0-05	Knockbridge
1963	‡ Newtown Blues	3-07	Roche Emmets	0-05	The Grove
1964	‡ Newtown Blues	1-10	O'Raghallaighs	1-05	Gaelic Grounds
1965	Newtown Blues	3-08	Clan na Gael	1-07	Páirc Uí Mhuirí
1966	Cooley Kickhams	2-08	Newtown Blues	1-10	St Brigid's Park
1967	Cooley Kickhams	-	A Final was not played	-	-
1968	St Bride's	1-10 (Replay, AET)	St Mary's	0-07	Páirc Mochta
1969	‡ Newtown Blues	1-08	Mattock Rangers	1-05	The Grove
1970	Cooley Kickhams	4-03	Newtown Blues	2-05	The Grove
1971	St Mary's	1-07	O'Raghallaighs	1-05	Páirc Uí Mhuirí
1972	Cooley Kickhams	3-08 (Replay)	Newtown Blues	2-05	Knockbridge
1973	O'Raghallaighs	1-11	St Bride's	0-06	Páirc Mhuire
1974	Cooley Kickhams	1-14	St Mary's	1-06	Knockbridge
1975	‡ St Mary's	w/o	O'Raghallaighs	scr.	Páirc Uí Mhuirí
1976	‡ Cooley Kickhams	2-10	Newtown Blues	1-09	Clan na Gael Park
1977	Newtown Blues	2-09	Roche Emmets	2-05	The Grove
1978	Dundalk Young Irelands	1-11	St Mary's	0-04	Páirc Mochta
1979	Cooley Kickhams	1-07	Clan na Gael	1-06	St Brigid's Park
1980	Kilkerley Emmets	1-09	Cooley Kickhams	2-05	Clan na Gael Park
1981	‡ Newtown Blues	2-11	Kilkerley Emmets	1-05	Cluskey Park
1982	Clan na Gael	2-10	Newtown Blues	0-04	The Grove
1983	Cooley Kickhams	2-07	Clan na Gael	0-07	St Brigid's Park
1984	Newtown Blues	0-08	Dundalk Young Irelands	0-03	McGeough Park
1985	St Fechin's	0-09	Cooley Kickhams	1-03	McGeough Park
1986	‡ Newtown Blues	0-10	Clan na Gael	1-04	Páirc Mhuire
1987	‡ Clan na Gael	1-08	Dreadnots	0-05	The Grove
1988	Dreadnots	0-13	St Mary's	2-04	The Grove
1989	‡ Cooley Kickhams	0-06	St Patrick's	0-05	St Brigid's Park
1990	Clan na Gael	1-09	St Mary's	0-06	Cluskey Park
1991	St Mary's	1-11	Stabannon Parnells	0-04	Knockbridge
1992	‡ Clan na Gael	0-12	Newtown Blues	1-05	The Grove
1993	‡ Clan na Gael	2-07 (Replay)	Stabannon Parnells	1-08	St Brigid's Park
1994	Clan na Gael	3-07	Dundalk Gaels	1-11	St Brigid's Park
1995	Stabannon Parnells	0-11	St Joseph's	0-07	The Grove
1996	Clan na Gael	1-12	St Patrick's	0-03	St Brigid's Park
1997	Clan na Gael	1-08 (Replay)	Newtown Blues	1-05	The Grove
1998	Stabannon Parnells	0-08	Newtown Blues	0-05	Páirc Mhuire
1999	St Patrick's	1-14	Cooley Kickhams	0-09	St Brigid's Park
2000	Clan na Gael	2-05 (Replay)	Cooley Kickhams	1-06	St Brigid's Park
2001	Roche Emmets	1-09	St Patrick's	0-08	St Brigid's Park
2002	St Mary's	1-05	Mattock Rangers	0-04	Gaelic Grounds
2003	‡ St Patrick's	0-13	St Bride's	1-07	Clan na Gael Park
2004	Cooley Kickhams	1-10	Glyde Rangers	0-07	Clan na Gael Park
2005	Newtown Blues	0-11	Cooley Kickhams	0-07	Páirc Na nGael
2006	Cooley Kickhams	1-06	Glyde Rangers	0-08	St Brigid's Park
2007	Cooley Kickhams	0-08 (Replay)	Naomh Malachi	0-06	Clan na Gael Park
2008	Cooley Kickhams	1-07	Newtown Blues	0-08	Clan na Gael Park
2009	St Patrick's	0-12 (Replay)	Newtown Blues	1-08	McGeough Park
2010	Newtown Blues	0-15	Kilkerley Emmets	0-09	McGeough Park
2011	Mattock Rangers	3-13 (AET)	Dreadnots	2-12	McGeough Park
2012	‡ St Patrick's	0-18	O'Connells	0-08	St Brigid's Park
2013	St Patrick's	1-17	Cooley Kickhams	2-05	St Brigid's Park
2014	‡ St Patrick's	1-10	Dreadnots	1-06	Clan na Gael Park
2015	Mattock Rangers	1-12	St Patrick's	0-14	Páirc Uí Mhuirí
2016	Dreadnots	2-15	Geraldines	1-16	Stabannon
2017	Naomh Máirtín	0-18 (AET)	Dreadnots	1-10	The Grove
2018	‡ Newtown Blues	2-10	Naomh Máirtín	1-08	Gaelic Grounds
2019	Naomh Máirtín	2-19	St Mary's	1-12	The Grove
2020	Cancelled (COVID-19)				
2021	St Mary's	-	A Final was not played	-	-
2022	Newtown Blues	0-11	St Mary's	1-07	Darver
2023	St Mochta's	0-12	Naomh Máirtín	0-11	Darver
2024	‡ St Mary's	1-15	St Mochta's	1-12	Stabannon
2025	St Mochta's	4-17	St Joseph's	0-14	Darver
2026	St Mary's	2-20	St Joseph's	0-07	Darver

== See also ==
- Mulligan, Fr.John (1984). The GAA in Louth - An Historical Record.
- Mulligan, Fr.John (2000). The GAA in Louth - An Historical Record (updated).
