= Roche Emmets GFC =

Louth-based Gaelic games club

- Emmití De Róiste
- Founded: 1947
- County: Louth
- Colours: Blue and White
- Grounds: Páirc De Róiste, Rathduff, County Louth
- Coordinates: 54.04028°N 6.46301°W

Playing kits
Standard colours

Roche Emmets GFC is a Gaelic Athletic Association (GAA) club that was founded in 1947. It fields gaelic football teams in competitions organised by Louth GAA. Located in Rathduff outside the town of Dundalk, a short distance from the historic Roche Castle, the club draws its support from the neighbouring parishes of Kilcurry and Faughart in north Louth.

In 2027, Roche Emmets will compete in the Louth Senior Championship and Division 1 of the county football leagues.

== History ==
Club status	Year(s)
Junior	1947-57
Senior	1958-94
Intermediate	1995-97
Senior	1998-2006
Intermediate	2007-14
Junior	2015-19
Intermediate	2020-23
Senior	2024 –

== Honours ==
- Louth Senior Football Championship (2): 1958, 1980
- Cardinal O'Donnell Cup (4): 1958, 1960, 1961, 2001
- Louth Senior Football League Division 1B (1): 2000
- Louth Intermediate Football Championship (1): 1997, 2023
- Louth Intermediate Football League (1): 2026
- Old Gaels/ACC/Paddy Sheelan Cup (4): 1960, 1981, 2001, 2008
- Louth Junior Football Championship (2): 1957, 2019
- Louth Junior A Football League (4): 1955, 1956, 2013, 2019
- Kevin Mullen Shield (1): 2016
- Louth Junior 2A Football Championship (3): 1953, 1979, 1988
- Louth Junior 2A Football League (1): 1987
- Louth Junior 2B Football Championship (4): 1995, 1997, 2012, 2021
- Louth Under-21 Football Championship (3): 1993, 1994, 2022
- Louth Minor Football Championship (5): ‡ 1977 1986, 1991, 1992, 1993
- Louth Junior 2 Football League (Division 4B) (2): 1996, 2007
- Louth Junior 2 Football League (Division 5) (1): 2023
- Louth Under-16 Football Championship (1): 1989
- Louth Minor B Football Championship (3): 1999, 2009, 2024

‡ Shared with Kilkerley Emmets and Naomh Malachi

== Inter-county players ==
- Centre half-back Jim McArdle was a member of the victorious Louth 1957 All-Ireland Championship squad. He suffered an injury in the semi-final win over Tyrone, which meant he was unable to play in the decider. He received a winner's medal after Louth beat Cork 1–09 to 1–07 in the All-Ireland Final.
- Mickey Gartlan - Played at midfield in Leinster finals of 1958 and 1960. Holder of O'Byrne Cup medal from 1963.
- Paddy Gallagher - Goalkeeper. Regular for Louth from late Sixties to early Seventies.
- Mick Brady - Defender. Played for Louth in 1956 before transferring to his native Cavan thereafter. Continued playing for Roche and captained the club to its maiden SFC win in 1958. Won an Ulster championship medal with Cavan in 1962.
- Jim Marmion - Centre-half forward. Played in 1964 Leinster Championship semi-final against Meath.
- Eugene Marmion - regular County midfielder from late Seventies to early Eighties. Member of 1980 O'Byrne Cup-winning squad.
- Aidan McArdle - Midfield. Appeared in 1994 Leinster Championship win against Carlow.
- Ciarán Nash - made two appearances in defence for Louth in 1994 Leinster Championship. Member of squad that won NFL Division 2 in 1996/97 and 1997 All-Ireland Senior B Championship.
- Aidan O'Neill - member of Louth panel that won NFL division 2 in 2000. Played at midfield in that year's Leinster Championship defeat by Kildare.
- Kevin Callaghan - Forward. member of Louth panel that won NFL division 2 in 2000.
- Shane McCoy - Goalkeeper. Played for Louth in Leinster Championships of 2004, 2005 and in 2013 All-Ireland series defeat by Kildare.
- Dan O'Connell - Midfield. Member of 2016 Louth panel that won NFL Division 4.
- Gerard Browne - Defender. Played in 2022 Championship under Mickey Harte.
- Peter Lynch - Centre-half back. Member of Leinster Senior Football Championship-winning team in 2025 against Meath. Also a runner-up in Leinster finals of 2023 & 2024 against Dublin.
