= Mattock Rangers GAA =

Louth-based Gaelic games club

Mattock Rangers
- Raonaithe Máiteoige
- Founded: 1952
- County: Louth
- Nickname: The Buzzards
- Colours: Red and Black
- Grounds: Páirc Mattock, School Lane, Collon
- Coordinates: 53.774747°N 6.481701°W

Playing kits
Standard colours

Senior Club Championships
	All Ireland	Leinster champions	Louth champions
Football:	-	-	4

Mattock Rangers Gaelic Athletic Association is a Gaelic football, camogie, hurling and ladies' Gaelic football club based in Collon, County Louth, Ireland.[1][2][3][4]

== History ==
The club was founded in 1952 and is named after the Mattock River, a tributary of the Boyne.

They won a Louth Junior Football Championship county title in 1961 and a Louth Intermediate Football Championship title in 1982. Mattock lost their first four Louth Senior Football Championship finals, in 1973, 1976, 1962 and 2001. Senior success finally came in 2002; in that year, Mattock Rangers reached the final of the Leinster Senior Club Football Championship, losing to Dunshaughlin. They have won three more senior titles since then. In 2015, they were relegated to the intermediate grade, which they subsequently won in 2019. They then went on a strong run, winning the 2019 Leinster Intermediate Club Football Championship before being beaten by Magheracloone in the All-Ireland Intermediate Club Football Championship semi final.

The hurlers have never been county champions, but reached the final of the Louth Senior Hurling Championship in 2011.

== Notable players ==
- Adrian Reid
- David Reid
- Mark Brennan

== Honours ==
=== Gaelic football ===
- Leinster Intermediate Club Football Championship (1): 2019
- Louth Senior Football Championship (4): 2002, 2005, 2009, 2010
- Cardinal O'Donnell Cup (2): 2011, 2015
- Louth Senior Football League Division 1B (1): 2005
- Louth Intermediate Football Championship (2): 1982, 2019
- Louth Junior Football Championship (1): 1961
- Louth Junior 2A Football Championship (1): 1960
- Louth Junior 2B Football Championship (1): 2022
- Louth Intermediate Football League (2): 1996, 1998
- Paddy Sheelan Cup (3): 2009, 2017, 2024
- Dealgan Milk Products Shield (4): 1988, 1992, 1993, 1996
- Louth Junior 2A Football League (4): 1977, 1979, 2004, 2018
- Louth Under-19 Football Championship (1): 2023 (shared with Hunterstown Rovers)
- Louth Junior 2 Football League (Division 5) (1): 2016
