= Oliver Plunketts GFC =

Louth-based Gaelic games club

- Oilibhéar Pluincéad CLG
- Founded: 1942
- County: Louth
- Colours: Maroon and white
- Grounds: Páirc Oilibhéar Pluincéad, Slane Road, Drogheda
- Coordinates: 53.72170°N 6.38236°W

Playing kits
Standard colours

Oliver Plunketts GFC is a GAA club catering for girls, boys, ladies and men, located in Drogheda, County Louth, Ireland. The club was formed in 1942 by the amalgamation of Ramblers United and St Joseph's. From its base on the Slane road, the club serves the Mell Parish in West Drogheda and fields gaelic football teams in competitions organised by Louth GAA.

In 1957 the club won the Louth Senior Football Championship, defeating St Mary's of Ardee. They went on to complete the League and Championship double that year by beating Dundalk Young Irelands in the final of the Cardinal O'Donnell Cup.

Oliver Plunketts currently compete in Division 2 of the county football Leagues. Managed by former player Emmet Kelleher, the club returned to Intermediate ranks by winning the 2025 Louth Junior Championship after a replay victory over Glyde Rangers.

== Honours ==
- Louth Senior Football Championship (1): 1957
- Louth Intermediate Football Championship (1): 1985
- Louth Junior Football Championship (4): 1981, 1984, 2014, 2025
- Cardinal O'Donnell Cup (2): 1957, 1959
- Old Gaels Cup (Senior Subsidiary League) (2): 1953, 1958
- Louth Junior A Football League (5): 1943, 1984, 1993, 1996, 2024
- Grogan Cup (3): 1999, 2001, 2004
- Kevin Mullen Shield (1): 2023
- Louth Junior 2B Football Championship (3): 1999, 2001, 2013
- Louth Junior 2 Football League (Division 4C) (3): 1994, 2001, 2011
- Louth Minor Football Championship (3): 1996, 2003, 2012
- Louth Minor Football League (1): 2003
- Louth Minor B Football Championship (1): 2020
- Louth Under-14 Football Championship (3): 1993, 2005, 2025
- Louth Under-14 Football League Division 1 (1): 2025

== Inter-county players ==
- Fr. Larry Carr – former Ramblers United player. Won Leinster Championship medals in 1943 and 1948. Centre half-forward.
- Mick Higgins – three-time All-Ireland winner with Cavan.
- Peadar Smith – centre half-back in 1957 All-Ireland Senior Football Championship final win against Cork. Unused substitute in Louth's 1950 defeat to Mayo.
- George Carroll – Defender on Louth teams from late 1950s to early Sixties.
- Frank 'Ja' Clarke – Won Cardinal O'Donnell Cup with Oliver Plunketts in 1959. Later transferred to Newtown Blues. A regular in Louth teams of 1960s.
- Jackie Reynolds – Forward. Unused substitute in the 1957 All-Ireland Final.
- Mal Clarke – Goalkeeper. Member of 1978 Louth side that won the Leinster Under-21 Championship. Brother of former Louth manager Paddy Clarke.
- Frank Taaffe – regular in the Louth forward line from mid-Seventies to 1985. Played on team that beat Meath in the 1975 Leinster Championship.
- Paddy Matthews – regular at right corner-back for Louth in 1980s.
- John Kermath – played at midfield in county's 2005 All-Ireland Senior Football Championship campaign.
- Robert Brodigan – appeared in 2014 Leinster Championship for Louth as substitute.
- Conor Early – made Louth debut in 2019. As of 2023, he is a regular at midfield for Mickey Harte's team. Won National Football League Division 3 medal in 2022. Transferred to Na Fianna in 2023.
