= Hunterstown Rovers GAC =

Louth-based Gaelic games club

Hunterstown Rovers
- Ragaire Baile Fiach
- Founded: 1941
- County: Louth
- Colours: Red and White
- Grounds: Páirc Baile Fiach
- Coordinates: 53°49′33″N 6°31′53″W

Playing kits
Standard colours

Senior Club Championships
	All Ireland	Leinster champions	Louth champions
Football:	0	0	0

Hunterstown Rovers is a Gaelic football (GAA) club located in Ardee, County Louth, Ireland. The club's pitch is located about 3 kilometres south of Ardee on the main Dublin-Derry Road (N2). Hunterstown has teams at all age levels starting from U5's through to senior level.

== History ==
The club was founded in 1941. After challenge matches against the O'Mahony's and Collon, the club affiliated with the Louth County Board in 1941, playing their first competitive match in March of that season in the Second Division Championship at Dunleer. They won this match, against St. Colmcille's, Togher, on a scoreline of 2–4 to nil. In their next outing however, Hunterstown lost in Dunleer. In that season, Rovers won their section of the Ranafast Cup only to fall to Kilcurry in the competition's semi-final stages.

From 1940 to 1980, Hunterstown played their football in a field owned by the Duffy family, close by the Travellers Rest. Because of its rather restricted size, it became known as the "Cabbage Field". Many visiting teams failed to come to terms with the pitch's pronounced slope.

At the club's 1980 A.G.M. it was decided to investigate the possibility of acquiring a permanent and suitable location. Later it was decided that the most desirable property was a spacious field adjoining the already existing clubrooms. This was owned by the Lynch family and within a short period of time negotiations were opened and completed. Early in 1983 the first game on the new grounds was a Ranafast Cup meeting of Rovers and Sean McDermott's. A match between Monaghan and Louth officially opened the brand new Páirc Baile Fiach in July 1984.

The club's first jerseys were navy blue/sky blue vertical stripes. Hunterstown played in the Cardinal O'Donnell Cup in 1946. The first success at County Board level came in 1954 when they won the Second Division Championship and the Ranafast Cup, beating Lann Léire in both finals at the Grove field in Castlebellingham.

The club was represented by right corner-back Ollie Reilly on the winning Louth team in the 1957 All-Ireland Senior Football Championship Final.

Rovers achieved senior status for the first time by winning the Louth Intermediate Football Championship in 1993. The club has most recently enjoyed success in the Louth Division 3 League (2012 winners) and the 2013 Junior Championship, going on to compete in the Leinster Junior Club Football Championship. Corner-forward Ryan Burns was a member of the Louth senior team that won the 2016 Allianz National League Division 4. In November 2016, Jim Matthews was appointed as manager of the Senior football team.

The club returned to the Louth Senior ranks for the first time since relegation in 2003, by winning the 2025 Louth Intermediate football final against Stabannon Parnells. The team was managed jointly by Seán Barry and Seán Kelly.

== Honours ==
- Louth Intermediate Football Championship (3): 1993, 1999, 2025
- Louth Junior Football Championship (4): 1959, 1987, 2013
- Leinster Junior Club Football Championship Runners-Up (1): 2013
- Louth Junior 2A Football Championship (2): 1954, 1973
- Louth Junior 2B Football Championship (2): 2014 2018
- Louth Intermediate Football League (3): 1991, 2001, 2024
- Louth Intermediate Football League (Division 2B) (1): 2006
- Paddy Sheelan Shield (1): 2017
- Louth Junior A Football League (2): 1982, 2012
- Louth Junior 2A Football League (2): 1954, 1972
- Louth Junior 2 Football League (Division 5) (2): 2018, 2022

== Inter-county players ==
- Mark Brennan
