= Dreadnots GFC =

Louth-based Gaelic games club

Dreadnots
- Founded: 1887
- County: Louth
- Colours: Black and Red
- Grounds: Páirc Dreadnots, Ganderstown, Clogherhead
- Coordinates: 53.77897°N 6.24604°W

Playing kits
Standard colours

Dreadnots GFC is a Gaelic Athletic Association (GAA) club that fields gaelic football teams in competitions organised by Louth GAA. It is located in the south Louth seaside village of Clogherhead.

The club has a local rivalry with neighbours St Fechin's. As of 2025, the club competes in the Louth Senior Championship and Division 1 of the county football Leagues.

== History ==
The club was founded in 1887, making it one of the oldest active GAA clubs in County Louth. In 1889, Dreadnots reached the final of the Louth Senior Football Championship, losing to Newtown Blues by 1–02 to 0–03.

In 1928 the club was suspended permanently after an incident during their Second Division Championship match against Glyde Rangers. The suspension was lifted in 1953 by the County Board.

The 2002 arrival of former Louth inter-county star Colin Kelly from Newtown Blues helped propel Dreadnots to two Louth Intermediate Football Championship titles in 2004 and 2008. In 2010, forward Páraic Smith played in the controversial 2010 Leinster Senior Football Championship Final against Meath.

123 years after their first appearance in the Senior final, Dreadnots contested the 2012 decider at the Gaelic Grounds in Drogheda against reigning champions St Patrick's. Once again they were runners-up, as St Patrick's won convincingly by nine points. A third visit to the county final in 2014 - this time under the management of now-retired Colin Kelly - ended in defeat to the same opposition as St Patrick's prevailed by two points, 1–10 to 1–08.

Dermot Campbell manned the full-back berth for Louth in the 2025 Leinster Football final, as the Wee County defeated neighbours Meath by 3-14 to 1-18. Anthony Williams was also in the match day squad although he was an unused substitute.

== Honours ==
- Cardinal O'Donnell Cup (2): 1988, 2016
- Paddy Sheelan Cup (1): 2019
- Louth Intermediate Football Championship (4): 1986, 2000, 2004, 2008
- Louth Intermediate Football League (6): 1979, 1981, 1985, 1995, 2004, 2010
- Dealgan Milk Products/Paddy Sheelan Shield (3): 1979, 1985, 2011
- Louth Junior Football Championship (1): 1999
- Louth Junior A Football League (1): 1976
- Avonmore Shield (1): 1999
- Louth Junior 2A Football Championship (2): 1962, 1974
- Louth Junior 2A Football League (6): 1955, 1959, 1960, 1961, 1962, 1973
- Louth Junior 2B Football Championship (1): 2019
- Louth Junior 2 Football League Division 4B (1): 2011
- Louth Junior 2 Football League Division 4C (1): 2005
- Louth Under-21 Football Championship (3): ‡ 1976, ‡ 1977, ‡ 2008
- Louth Minor B Football Championship (2): 2019, 2025
- Louth Minor Football League (1): 2006 ‡

‡ Shared with St Fechin's

== Inter-county players ==
Dreadnots players who have represented Louth at senior inter-county level include:

- Denis Kelleher
- Kevin Dawe
- Paddy McGuigan
- Derek Shevlin
- Pádraig Rath
- James Califf
- Páraic Smith
- Anthony Williams
- Liam Shevlin
- Dermot Campbell
- Jay Hughes
