= Seán McDermott's GFC (Louth) =

Louth-based Gaelic games club

Seán McDermott's
- Seán Mac Diarmada CLG
- Founded: 1947
- County: Louth
- Nickname: The Seán's
- Colours: Green and red
- Grounds: Páirc Mac Diarmada, Mountrush, Ardee, County Louth
- Coordinates: 53.88712°N 6.59561°W

Playing kits
Standard colours

Seán McDermott's GFC is a Gaelic Football club in Mountrush, a townland in the civil parish of Ardee, County Louth, Ireland, which fields teams in competitions organised by Louth GAA. 'The Seán's' compete in the Louth Junior Championship and Division 3 of the all county football league. Bryan Sharkey is the senior team manager.

== History ==
The club is named after County Leitrim republican Seán Mac Diarmada, who was executed for his participation in the Easter Rising of 1916. Players are drawn from the neighbouring Ardee townlands of Cookstown and Mountrush.

In 1974, the club won the county Junior 'Double' of League and Championship titles. Dundalk Young Irelands were defeated in the MacArdle Cup final, while in the Championship title match, the Sean's triumphed over Ardee neighbours St Mary's, on a scoreline of 0–07 to 0–05.

The club has reached the final of the Louth Intermediate Championship twice and lost both times, to Stabannon Parnells in 1989 and Naomh Fionnbarra of Togher in 2001, after a replay.

In 2022, the club reached the final of the Kevin Mullen Plate competition, only to be beaten by Stabannon Parnells.

== Inter-county players ==
- Éamonn and Noel Cluskey – brothers who represented Louth in the Leinster Senior Football Championship during the 1980s. Noel won a Leinster Under-21 Championship medal in 1981 as part of the county team that defeated Longford in the provincial final.
- Tony Breen

== Honours ==
- Louth Junior Football Championship (1): 1974
- Louth Junior A Football League (3): 1974, 2000, 2005
- Kevin Mullen Shield (3): 2000, 2005, 2013
- Louth Junior 2A Football Championship (1): 1958
- Louth Junior 2A Football League (1): 1952
- Louth Junior 2 Football League (Division 4C) (1): 2004
- Louth Junior 2 Football League (Division 4D) (1): 2003
