= Westerns GFC =

Louth-based Gaelic games club

Westerns
- Na hIartharaigh CLG
- Founded: 1951
- County: Louth
- Nickname: The Westies
- Colours: Green and Gold
- Grounds: Páirc Na hIartharaigh, Reaghstown, Ardee
- Coordinates: 53.91159°N 6.60825°W

Playing kits
Standard colours

Westerns GFC is a Gaelic Athletic Association (GAA) club that was founded in 1951 and fields gaelic football teams in competitions organised by Louth GAA. The club is based in the parish of Reaghstown, close to the town of Ardee and the Louth/Monaghan border.

Westerns have reached the final of the Louth Junior Football Championship four times, in each case being unsuccessful in winning the Christy Bellew Cup.

As of 2023, the club competes in the Junior Championship and Division 3B of the county football Leagues. Anthony Durnin is the manager of the senior team.

== Honours ==
- Louth Junior 2A Football League (1): 1975
- Louth Junior 2A Football Championship (1): 1977
- Louth Junior A Football League (1): 2001
- Drogheda and Dundalk Dairies/Kevin Mullen Shield (2): 1978, 2006
- Louth Junior 1 Football League (Division 3B) (1): 2019

== Inter-county players ==
Reaghstown native Tommy Durnin made his championship debut for Louth in 2015 against Westmeath and is still a county player under manager Mickey Harte in 2023. He was a member of the Westerns side that won the Division 3B Football League in 2019. Durnin transferred his club allegiance to Inniskeen Grattans of Monaghan in 2021.
