= Louth Intermediate Football Championship =

- Founded: 1907
- Trophy: Séamus Flood Cup
- Title holders: Stabannon Parnells (2nd title)
- Most titles: Dundalk Gaels (5)
- Sponsors: CTI Business Solutions

The Louth Intermediate Football Championship is an annual Gaelic Athletic Association competition, organised by Louth GAA, among the intermediate grade Gaelic football clubs in County Louth, Ireland.

== History ==
The competition, introduced as a bridge between the senior and junior grades, was first staged in 1907 and annually until 1912, when the county board discontinued it. It was revived 32 years later in 1944. However, the competition was only staged twice before it lapsed again. It re-emerged permanently on the county scene in 1978 with Kilkerley Emmets becoming the first winners of the Seamus Flood Cup.

== Trophy ==
The winning team is presented with the Séamus Flood Cup, named after the Dundalk GAA official (d. April 1970) and Clan na Gael club member who was chairman of Leinster GAA from 1939 to 1941. The Leinster Under-20 Football Championship trophy is also named in his honour.

The winners of the Louth Intermediate Football Championship progress to the Leinster Intermediate Club Football Championship.

== Finals ==
| Year | Winner | Score | Opponent | Score | Winning Captain | Final Venue |
|---|---|---|---|---|---|---|
| 1907 | Cooley Kickhams | 0-09 | Dromiskin Mitchels | 0-03 | Charles P. Kearney | Athletic Grounds |
| 1908 | Boyne Emmets | 4-05 | Hitchestown | 0-07 | - | Athletic Grounds |
| 1909 | Dundalk Rangers | 1-11 | Castlebellingham | 1-06 | - | Athletic Grounds |
| 1910 | ‡ John Boyle O'Reilly's (Dundalk) | 0-02 | Castlebellingham | 2-00 | - | Ardee |
| 1911 | Ardee St Mochta's | 0-01 | Geraldines | 0-00 | - | The Grove |
| 1912 | Geraldines | 2-04 | Funshog | 0-00 | - | Shamrock Lodge |
| 1944 | ‡ Null and Void | | | | | |
| 1945 | Clan na Gael | 1-07 | Oliver Plunketts | 2-01 | - | Athletic Grounds |
| 1978 | Kilkerley Emmets | 0-14 | Dreadnots | 2-05 | Arthur Mulholland | Knockbridge |
| 1979 | Geraldines | 2-08 | Dundalk Gaels | 1-04 | Michael Lynch | Páirc Mochta |
| 1980 | St Patrick's | 0-09, 1-06 (R) | St Bride's | 2-03, 0-08 (R) | Eamonn McCann | Cluskey Park |
| 1981 | St Mochta's | 2-07 | St Bride's | 2-02 | Michael Byrne | Páirc Mhuire |
| 1982 | Mattock Rangers | 2-04 | St Joseph's | 1-04 | Damien Reid | Páirc Mhuire |
| 1983 | St Joseph's | 1-06 | Oliver Plunketts | 0-08 | Noel Murtagh | The Grove |
| 1984 | St Patrick's | 1-05 | St Bride's | 0-03 | Diarmuid McArtain | Clan na Gael Park |
| 1985 | Oliver Plunketts | 2-08 | Seán O'Mahony's | 0-06 | Michael Rossiter | Páirc Mhuire |
| 1986 | Dreadnots | 1-06, 3-11 (R) | Naomh Máirtín | 2-03, 2-08 (R) | Pádraig Califf | Páirc Uí Mhuirí |
| 1987 | Dundalk Gaels | 3-10 | Geraldines | 0-08 | Davy McDonnell | Páirc Mochta |
| 1988 | Naomh Máirtín | 0-07 | Naomh Malachi | 1-03 | Martin Morgan | Páirc Uí Mhuirí |
| 1989 | Stabannon Parnells | 1-13 | Seán McDermott's | 0-04 | Fiachra Bell | Páirc Mhuire |
| 1990 | St Joseph's | 3-08 | Naomh Malachi | 0-11 | David Mulligan | Páirc Mochta |
| 1991 | Dundalk Gaels | 2-09 | Dundalk Young Irelands | 1-05 | Robbie McCrave | Knockbridge |
| 1992 | Seán O'Mahony's | 0-12, 1-11 (R) | Naomh Fionnbarra | 1-09, 1-02 (R) | Willie Crawley | The Grove |
| 1993 | Hunterstown Rovers | 0-09 | Dundalk Young Irelands | 0-08 | Thomas Duff | Knockbridge |
| 1994 | Lann Léire | 3-08 | John Mitchels | 0-07 | Brendan Martin | Páirc Mhuire |
| 1995 | Geraldines | 1-09 (R) | Mattock Rangers | 1-06 (R) | Nicholas Browne | Páirc Mhuire |
| 1996 | Dundalk Young Irelands | 0-14 | Naomh Fionnbarra | 1-08 | Kevin Gorham | The Grove |
| 1997 | Roche Emmets | 0-13 | Naomh Fionnbarra | 0-10 | Gerard Craven | St Brigid's Park |
| 1998 | Seán O'Mahony's | 2-06 | Oliver Plunketts | 0-10 | Martin Connolly | McGeough Park |
| 1999 | Hunterstown Rovers | 2-09 | Geraldines | 1-11 | John McBride | The Grove |
| 2000 | Dreadnots | 2-08 | St Kevin's | 0-10 | Paul Aspell | Páirc Mhuire |
| 2001 | Naomh Fionnbarra | 1-11, 0-15 (R) | Seán McDermott's | 2-08, 1-08 (R) | Gerard Leonard | The Grove |
| 2002 | Naomh Malachi | 3-08 | Geraldines | 2-08 | Micheál Daly | St Brigid's Park |
| 2003 | Dundalk Gaels | 1-06 | Oliver Plunketts | 1-03 | Peter McGinnity | The Grove |
| 2004 | Dreadnots | 2-07 | O'Raghallaighs | 1-09 | Darren Malone | Páirc Uí Mhuirí |
| 2005 | Geraldines | 0-11 | Naomh Malachi | 0-10 | John Neary | Clan na Gael Park |
| 2006 | Naomh Malachi | 1-09 | O'Connells | 1-08 | Ronan Greene | Páirc Mochta |
| 2007 | Dundalk Gaels | 1-09 | Dreadnots | 0-08 | Aidan Delaney | Páirc Mhuire |
| 2008 | Dreadnots | 2-10 | Na Piarsaigh | 1-12 | Fergal McGuigan | Páirc Mhuire |
| 2009 | Naomh Malachi | 1-12 | Na Piarsaigh | 1-11 | Aidan Murphy | Cluskey Park |
| 2010 | Dundalk Young Irelands | 2-11 | O'Raghallaighs | 1-11 | Aaron Rogers | Páirc Mhuire |
| 2011 | O'Raghallaighs | 0-09 | Clan na Gael | 0-06 | James Moonan | McGeough Park |
| 2012 | O'Connells | 0-09 | Clan na Gael | 1-04 | Niall Conlon | McGeough Park |
| 2013 | Geraldines | 2-15 | St Bride's | 2-05 | Jim McEneaney | St Brigid's Park |
| 2014 | Seán O'Mahony's | 1-11 | St Fechin's | 1-08 | Pat O'Brien | Clan na Gael Park |
| 2015 | Kilkerley Emmets | 0-10, 3-10 (R) | Clan na Gael | 1-07, 0-11 (R) | Shane Lennon | McGeough Park |
| 2016 | St Joseph's | 2-08 | Mattock Rangers | 0-12 | Dáire Smyth | St Brigid's Park |
| 2017 | O'Connells | 1-11 | Clan na Gael | 0-08 | Stuart Reynolds | Páirc Uí Mhuirí |
| 2018 | St Mochta's | 1-15 | St Fechin's | 1-13 | Darren McMahon | The Grove |
| 2019 | Mattock Rangers | 1-17 | Kilkerley Emmets | 0-12 | Adrian Reid | Stabannon |
| 2020 | St Bride's | 1-21 | Kilkerley Emmets | 1-08 | James Costelloe | Darver |
| 2021 | St Fechin's | 1-11 | Cooley Kickhams | 1-09 | Conor Haughney | Clan na Gael Park |
| 2022 | Cooley Kickhams | 1-13 | St Kevin's | 0-12 | Darren Marks | Páirc Mhuire |
| 2023 | Roche Emmets | 0-12 | O'Raghallaighs | 1-08 | Glen Stewart | Clan na Gael Park |
| 2024 | Dundalk Gaels | 2-04, 2-09 (R) | Hunterstown Rovers | 1-07, 0-13 (R) | Dylan McKeown | Darver |
| 2025 | Hunterstown Rovers | 2-10 | Stabannon Parnells | 0-15 | Ryan Burns | Páirc Mhuire |
| 2026 | Stabannon Parnells | 0-13 | St Bride's | 0-11 | Bobby Butterly | The Grove |

‡ Title awarded to John Boyle O'Reilly's. Castlebellingham had fielded unregistered players.

‡ Drogheda Shamrocks beat Dundalk Young Irelands 1-06 to 0-06 in the Final. Championship was later declared void after County Board established that Shamrocks had fielded an ineligible player.

== See also ==
- Leinster Intermediate Club Football Championship
- Mulligan, Fr.John (1984). The GAA in Louth - An Historical Record.
- Mulligan, Fr.John (2000). The GAA in Louth - An Historical Record (updated).
