= St Mochta's GFC =

Louth-based Gaelic games club

- Naomh Mochta CPG
- Founded: 1934
- County: Louth
- Colours: Amber and Blue
- Grounds: Páirc Mochta, Artoney, Louth Village
- Coordinates: 53.95047°N 6.54874°W

Playing kits
Standard colours

St Mochta's GFC is a Gaelic Athletic Association (GAA) club that fields Gaelic football teams in competitions organised by Louth GAA. It is based in the village of Louth, where Saint Mochta is said to have founded a monastery in the 6th century. Both the club and the football ground, which has been a frequent venue for county finals, are named in his honour.

In 2021 the club reached the final of the Louth Senior Football Championship for the first time. Their side, which included former AFL player and Louth county footballer Ciarán Byrne, lost by eleven points to defending champions Naomh Máirtín at Ardee's Páirc Mhuire.

Cork-native John Moylan was manager of the senior team in 2023. In August of that year St Mochta's won their first ever Senior trophy, the Cardinal O'Donnell Cup, by beating Naomh Máirtín in the Louth Senior Football League Final.

St Mochta's regained their Division 1 League title in 2025, this time under the management of former Leitrim boss Stephen Poacher.

== Honours ==
- Cardinal O'Donnell Cup (2): 2023, 2025
- Louth Intermediate Football Championship (2): 1981, 2018
- Louth Junior Football Championship (5): 1944, 1975, 1995, 2004, 2009
- Louth Junior A Football League (3): 1936, 1973, 2007
- Dealgan Milk Products Shield (1): 1984
- Avonmore/Kevin Mullen Shield (3): 1990, 1991, 2004
- Louth Junior 2A Football Championship (3): 1935, 1956, 1970
- Louth Junior 2A Football League (1): 1969
- Louth Junior 2 Football League (Division 4C) (2): 2007, 2014

== Inter-county players ==
St Mochta's players who have represented Louth at senior inter-county level include:

- John Byrne
- Brendan Byrne
- Declan Byrne
- Ciarán Byrne
- Darren McMahon
- Gerry Garland
- Craig Lennon
