= O'Raghallaighs GFC =

Louth-based Gaelic games club

O'Raghallaighs Gaelic Football Club
- Founded: 1957
- County: Louth
- Nickname: The Raghs
- Colours: Green and white
- Grounds: Gaelic Grounds, North Road, Drogheda
- Coordinates: 53.72261°N 6.36012°W

Playing kits
Home Kit	Change Kit

Senior Club Championships
	All Ireland	Leinster champions	Louth champions
Football:	-	-	1

O'Raghallaighs GFC is a Gaelic Athletic Association club from Drogheda, County Louth, Ireland. The club fields Gaelic football teams in competitions organised by Louth GAA. The club has GAA Handball teams and ladies football team.

The club plays home fixtures at the Integral GAA Grounds, situated beside Sullivan and Lambe Park - the home of Drogheda United.

As of 2025, the O'Raghallaighs currently compete in the Intermediate Championship and Division 2 of the county football Leagues.

== History ==
The club was founded on 12 July 1957 and is named after the Irish writer, activist and IRB member John Boyle O'Reilly, who had links to the town of Drogheda.

In the mid-1970s the club moved from their then home at Forest Grange to the Gaelic Grounds on Drogheda's North Road, which they lease on a long-term arrangement with Louth GAA.

== Honours ==
- Louth Senior Football Championship (1): 1965
- Cardinal O'Donnell Cup (1): 1973
- Louth Intermediate Football Championship (1): 2011
- Louth Junior Football Championship (3): 1963, 1991, 2001
- Louth Junior 2B Football Championship (1): 2017
- Louth Minor Football Championship (4): 1959, 1960, 1961, 1963
- Old Gaels/Paddy Sheelan Cup (3): 1964, 1977, 2010
- Drogheda and Dundalk Dairies/Avonmore/Kevin Mullen Shield (3): 1988, 1998, 2001
- Louth Intermediate Football League (3): 2011, 2018, 2022
- Louth Intermediate Football League Division 2B (1): 2005
- Louth Junior 2 Football League (Division 6) (1): 2017
