= Geraldines GFC =

Louth-based Gaelic games club

Geraldines
- Na Gearaltaigh
- Founded: 1904
- County: Louth
- Colours: Green and White
- Grounds: McGeough Park, Haggardstown
- Coordinates: 53.963543°N 6.403485°W

Playing kits
Standard colours

Senior Club Championships
	All Ireland	Leinster champions	Louth champions
Football:	0	0	5

Geraldines are a GAA club in Haggardstown, County Louth, and Blackrock, County Louth, Ireland. The club fields Gaelic football teams in competitions organized by Louth GAA.

== History ==
The club was founded in 1904 and was originally known as Dundalk Geraldines. The club competes in the Louth Intermediate Championship and Division 1 of the county football Leagues. Ronan Sexton is the Mens Senior manager as of 2026.

== Achievements ==
- Louth Senior Football Championship (5): 1913, 1915, 1916, 1920, 1982
- Leinster Intermediate Club Football Championship (1): 2013
- Senior Football League (O'Hanlon Cup) (1): 1920
- Louth Intermediate Football Championship (5): 1912, 1979, 1995, 2005, 2013
- Louth Junior Football Championship (4): 1909, 1920, 1939, 1966
- Louth Intermediate Football League (2): 1978, 2013
- Louth Intermediate Football League Division 2B (1): 2003
- Louth Junior A Football League (3): 1957, 1958, 1961
- Louth Junior 2A Football Championship (2): 2016, 2023
- Dealgan Milk Products Shield (1): 1994
- Louth Minor Football Championship (4): 1995, 2007, 2008, 2013
- Louth Minor B Football Championship (2): 2002, 2006
- Louth Under-21 Football Championship (5): 1975, 1983, 2009, 2011, 2012
- Louth Junior 2A Football League (1): 1984
- Louth Junior 2B Football Championship (3): 1998, 2003, 2009
- Louth Junior 2 Football League Division 4B (5): 1994, 1995, 2006, 2014, 2026

== Inter-county players ==
- Dan Corcoran - the club's fourth ever winner of a third-level All-Ireland medal by winning the Sigerson Cup with DCU in 2020
