= Naomh Máirtín CPG =

Louth-based Gaelic games club

Naomh Máirtín
- Founded: 1957
- County: Louth
- Nickname: The Jocks
- Colours: Blue and White
- Grounds: Pairc Naomh Máirtín, Silloge, Monasterboice
- Coordinates: 53.769142°N 6.397498°W

Playing kits
Standard colours

Senior Club Championships
	All Ireland	Leinster champions	Louth champions
Football:	-	-	3

Naomh Máirtín Cumann Peile Gaelach is a Gaelic football and ladies' Gaelic football club based in Monasterboice, County Louth, Ireland.

== History ==
Naomh Máirtín was founded in 1957 and named after Martin of Tours.

Left corner-back Jim Mooney was a member of Louth's Leinster Junior Championship-winning squad of 1966.

In 1980 the club completed a Junior clean sweep of Shield, League and Championship competitions, remaining unbeaten throughout the year.

They reached the finals of the 2018 and 2019 Louth Senior Football Championship, losing on both occasions to Newtown Blues. In 2020 the club won the county senior championship for the first time in its history, defeating St Mary's. Twelve months later the club repeated this success, overcoming St Mochta's to win back-to-back titles.

Forward Sam Mulroy has been captain of the Louth senior footballers since 2021. He received an All-Star nomination in 2024. He lifted the Delaney Cup in 2025 after Louth's Leinster final victory against Meath and received the Man of the Match award.

Captained by Eoghan Callaghan, Naomh Máirtín defeated Newtown Blues in the 2025 county senior final by seven points, to claim their third ever Joe Ward Cup. The curtain-raiser to the senior final saw the Martins collect more silverware, as their minor footballers beat St Mary's by five points to win the county Minor Championship.

== Notable players ==
- Michael Fanning
- Craig Lynch
- Sam Mulroy
- Brendan Reilly
- JP Rooney

== Honours ==
- Louth Senior Football Championship (3): 2020, 2021, 2025
- Louth Intermediate Football Championship (1): 1988
- Louth Junior Football Championship (1): 1980
- Cardinal O'Donnell Cup (2): 2017, 2019
- Louth Senior Football League Division 1B (1): 2006
- Louth Junior 2A Football Championship (5): 1959, 1972, 2012, 2019, 2022
- Louth Minor Football Championship (3): 2016, 2019, 2025
- Louth Junior 2C Football Championship (2): 2018, 2025
- Paddy Sheelan Cup (1): 2023
- Louth Junior A Football League (2): 1978, 1980
- Paddy Sheelan Shield (1): 2012
- Drogheda and Dundalk Dairies Shield (1): 1980
- Louth Junior 2A Football League (2): 1963, 2022
- Louth Junior 2 Football League Division 4B (1): 2004
- Louth Junior 2 Football League Division 4C (1): 2010
- Junior 2 Football League (Division 6) (1): 2019
- Louth Minor Football League (2): 2007, 2016
- Louth Minor B Football Championship (1): 2003
- Louth Under-16 Football Championship (1): 2025
- Louth Under-15 Football Championship (1): 2024
- Louth Under-14 Football Championship (2): 2013, 2022
