= O'Connells GFC (Louth) =

Louth-based Gaelic games club

O'Connells
- Uí Chonaill CLG
- Founded: 1929
- County: Louth
- Colours: Maroon and White
- Grounds: The Grove Field, Castlebellingham
- Coordinates: 53.89510°N 6.38755°W

Playing kits
Standard colours

O'Connells GFC is a Gaelic Athletic Association (GAA) club that fields gaelic football teams in competitions organised by Louth GAA. The club pitch is located in the mid-Louth village of Castlebellingham. Players are drawn from Castlebellingham, Kilsaran and surrounding areas.

As of 2024, the club competes in the Louth Junior Championship and Division 3A of the county football Leagues.

== History ==
The village had been represented in Louth GAA competitions by Glyde Rangers in the late 1800s and then Castlebellingham. The latter had three representatives on the Louth team that won the 1925 All-Ireland Junior Football Championship, including the captain Jack Lynch. The club had use of the Grove field, which had been leased from the Bellingham Estate in the early Twenties. In 1928 Castlebellingham won the Louth Junior Championship, beating St Mary's in the final at Drogheda. Castlebellingham folded shortly afterwards.

O'Connells was then founded in 1929. As it was the centenary of Catholic emancipation it was decided to name the club after Daniel O'Connell. Later that year they reached the final of the Louth Senior Football Championship, only to lose to Wolfe Tones by 2–06 to 0–01.

In 2012, O'Connells won the county Intermediate Championship for the first time and progressed to represent Louth in the Leinster Intermediate Club Football Championship Final. A low-scoring game in Drogheda saw them edged out 0–04 to 0–03 by Kildare champions Monasterevin.

In 2013, the club won a Senior-grade competition for the first time, by beating St Patrick's in the final of the Paddy Sheelan Cup.

== Honours ==
- Louth Intermediate Football Championship (2): 2012, 2017
- Louth Junior Football Championship (2): 1983, 1988
- Louth Intermediate Football League (1): 2009
- Intermediate Football League Division 2B (1): 2001
- Paddy Sheelan Cup (1): 2013
- Paddy Sheelan Shield (1): 2015
- Louth Junior A Football League (3): 1992, 1994, 1999
- Avonmore/Kevin Mullen Shield (3): 1993, 1994, 2024
- Louth Junior 2A Football Championship (3): 1932, 1949, 1976
- Louth Junior 2B Football Championship (1): 2010
- Louth Junior 2 Football League Division 4B (3): 2005, 2009, 2012
- Louth Junior 2 Football League Division 4C (4): 1999, 2000, 2003, 2015
- Louth Under-21 Football Championship (4): 1986, 1997, 1998, 2014 (shared with Stabannon Parnells)

== Inter-county players ==
O'Connells players who have represented Louth at senior inter-county level include:

- Gerry Fox
- Stefan White
- Mark Stanfield
- Colm Doyle
- Colm Kearney
- Stuart Reynolds
- Cian Doyle
- Niall Conlon
