= Glyde Rangers GFC =

Louth-based Gaelic games club

Glyde Rangers
- Raonairi Gluide
- Founded: 1926
- County: Louth
- Colours: Sky Blue and Navy
- Grounds: Páirc Uí Thaibh, Tallanstown
- Coordinates: 53.91754°N 6.54702°W

Playing kits
Standard colours

Glyde Rangers GFC is a Gaelic Athletic Association (GAA) club that fields gaelic football teams in competitions organised by Louth GAA. It is based in the County Louth village of Tallanstown, eleven kilometres southwest of Dundalk.

As of 2025, the club competes in the Louth Junior Football Championship and Division 3 of the county football Leagues.

At underage level, Glyde Rangers regularly combine with Tallanstown parish neighbours Westerns, Seán McDermott's and John Mitchels to enter teams in competitions under the banner of 'Baile Talún'.

The club also has a Ladies' Gaelic football team that competes in the county Intermediate Championship.

== History ==
The club was founded in 1926 and takes its name from the eponymous river, which flows through Tallanstown village. The club's sole success in the Louth Senior Football Championship came in 1934, when they defeated Wolfe Tones of Drogheda in the county final by 1–03 to 0–04.

== Honours ==
- Louth Senior Football Championship (1): 1934
- Cardinal O'Donnell Cup (1): 1932
- Louth Junior Football Championship (6): 1929, 1948, 1962, 1969, 1990, 1996, 2023
- Louth Senior Football League Division 1B (1): 2003
- Louth Intermediate Football League (2): 2000, 2008
- Louth Junior A Football League (4): 1969, 1986, 2015, 2017
- Louth Junior 2A Football Championship (3): 1928, 1933, 1944
- Louth Junior 2B Football Championship (1): 2000
- Drogheda and Dundalk Dairies/Kevin Mullen Shield (3): 1986, 2017, 2025
- Louth Junior 2 Football League Division 4C (1): 1993
- Louth Junior 2 Football League Division 4B (3): 1999, 2000, 2002

== Inter-county players ==
Glyde Rangers players who have represented Louth at senior inter-county level include:

- Jimmy Coyle
- Jimmy Kelly
- Eugene Callan
- Paddy Fox
- Richie Barry
- Gerry Sheridan
- Richie Brennan
- Niall Flynn
- Conor Sheridan
- David Devaney
- Trevor O'Brien
- Niall Sharkey
