= Lann Léire CPG =

Louth-based Gaelic games club

Lann Léire
- Founded: 1952
- County: Louth
- Colours: Blue and White
- Grounds: Páirc Uí Mhuirí, Shamrock Hill, Dunleer
- Coordinates: 53.83121°N 6.40484°W

Playing kits
Standard colours

Lann Léire CPG is a Gaelic Athletic Association (GAA) club that fields gaelic football teams in competitions organised by Louth GAA. It is based in the County Louth town of Dunleer. The club plays home matches at Páirc Uí Mhuirí, named after Larry Murray, the Louth priest who made a significant contribution to GAA affairs in the county and elsewhere.

As of 2023, the club competes in the Louth Junior Championship and Division 2 of the county football Leagues. Former Louth captain Nicky Malone is the senior team manager.

== History ==
A club called Thomas Davis existed in Dunleer in the 1940s. Louth GAA records show that they won the Second Division Championship in 1946. An earlier version of the Lann Léire club had reached the finals of the Second Division Championship and the Ranafast Cup in 1942, losing both to Kilkerley Emmets. There were no active GAA clubs in the area by the early 1950s however. Hence a decision was made to re-establish Lann Léire to serve the local community. The club was launched at a meeting held in Dunleer Temperance Hall in 1952. The members of the first committee were: Martin Magee, Jim Hoey, Billy Hoey, Jimmy McShane, Nick Englishby and Bennie Landy. The club chose to play in Blue and White jerseys.

Louth met Donegal in a challenge match to mark the official opening of Páirc Uí Mhuirí on 21 June 1964. Louth won the match by 3–11 to 3–7.

The 1990s saw the club play in the Louth Senior Football Championship for the first time, by virtue of their victory over John Mitchels in the final of the 1994 Intermediate Championship. They also won the Old Gaels Cup - the Intermediate Football League - for a third consecutive year in 1994.

In 1998 the team reached the Louth Senior Football Championship Final for the first time in the club's history. There was much excitement in the town as the team prepared to face Dundalk side Clan na Gael in the decider. The match would end in defeat for Lann Léire by 0–08 to 0–04. The club's fortunes declined in the 2000s as they were first relegated back down to the Intermediate grade and then Junior football at the end of 2006.

Since then the club has reached three Louth Junior Championship Finals - in 2008, 2012 and 2020 - losing all three.

== Honours ==
- Louth Junior Football Championship (1): 1985
- Louth Intermediate Football Championship (1): 1994
- Louth Intermediate Football League (3): 1992, 1993, 1994
- Louth Junior 2A Football Championship (3): 1955, 1971, 1975
- Louth Junior 2 Football League (4): 1953, 1971, 1985, 1996
- Drogheda and Dundalk Dairies/Kevin Mullen Shield (4): 1981, 2009, 2012, 2015
- Kevin Mullen Plate (3): 2013, 2014, 2018
- Louth Junior 2 Football League (Division 4D) (1): 2012 2015
- Louth Minor 'B' Football Championship (1): ‡ 2015

‡ Shared with Naomh Fionnbarra

== Inter-county players ==
Lann Léire players who have represented Louth at senior inter-county level include:

- Bartle Faulkner
- Aidan King
- Martin Farrelly
- Nicky Malone
- John McGrane
- Carlos Lambe
