= Stabannon Parnells GFC =

Athletic association club in Ireland

Stabannon Parnells
- Parnell Tigh Beannáin
- Founded: 1933
- County: Louth
- Colours: Gold and green
- Grounds: Páirc Parnel Tigh Beannáin
- Coordinates: 53°51′56″N 6°26′25″W

Playing kits
Standard colours

Senior Club Championships
	All Ireland	Leinster champions	Louth champions
Football:	0	0	6

Stabannon Parnells Gaelic Football Cub (/stəˈbænən pɑːrˈnɛlz/, sta-BAN-ən) is a Gaelic Athletic Association club located in Stabannon, County Louth, Ireland. The club is primarily concerned with the game of Men's and Ladies' Gaelic football.

== History ==
Located in the village of Stabannon (Stabannan), east of Ardee, Stabannon Parnells GFC was founded in 1933 and named for Charles Stewart Parnell, however, the existence of Gaelic football teams in the parish predates the foundation of the Gaelic Athletic Association in 1884. The club first fielded a team in 1934 when Stabannon Parnells entered the Louth second division championship.

Between 1949 and 1956 the club contested four Louth SFC finals and won two, including being the first ever recipients of the Joe Ward Cup. After winning the Louth IFC title in 1989, the 1990s proved to be a successful decade, with four Louth SFC titles secured from six final appearances in ten years. A period of decline followed, with Stabannon Parnells being relegated from senior to intermediate and eventually junior, before winning the Louth JFC title in 2022.

The Parnells compete in the Louth Intermediate Championship and Division 2 of the county football Leagues. Shane Sweeney is the club's senior team manager.

== Honours ==
- Louth Senior Football Championship (6): 1949, 1954, 1991, 1994, 1997, 1999
- Louth Intermediate Football Championship (2): 1989, 2026
- Louth Junior Football Championship (2): 1943, 2022
- Cardinal O'Donnell Cup (5): 1945, 1950, 1951, 1995, 1998
- Louth Intermediate Football League (1): 1989
- Louth Junior 1 Football League (1): 2023
- Louth Junior 1 Football League (Division 3B) (1): 2022
- ACC Cup (2): 1995, 2000
- Dealgan Milk Products Shield (1): 1989
- Louth Junior 2A Football Championship (4): 1936, 1941, 1951, 1968
- Louth Junior 2B Football Championship (1): 2007
- Louth Junior 2A Football League (1): 1941
- Kevin Mullen Shield (1): 2008
- Kevin Mullen Plate (1): 2022

== Notable players ==
- Tom Conlon: All-Ireland SFC-winner (1957)
- Colin Quinn: Louth SFC-winner (1999)
- Paddy Butterly: Played in the forward line for Louth in the opening two rounds of the successful 1957 Leinster Senior Football Championship campaign.
