= 2026 Louth Senior Football Championship =

Gaelic football tournament

Tournament details
- County: Louth
- Year: 2026
- Trophy: Joe Ward Cup
- Sponsor: Anchor Tours
- Date: 22 August - 24 October 2026
- Teams: 12
- Defending champions: Naomh Máirtín

Winners
- Champions: Newtown Blues (24th win)
- Manager: Johnny Clerkin
- Captain: Ciarán Downey
- Qualify for: Leinster Club SFC

Runners-up
- Runners-up: St Mochta's
- Manager: Kevin McClorey
- Captain: Darren McMahon

Promotion/Relegation
- Relegated team(s): Hunterstown Rovers

Other
- Matches played: 24
- Website: Louth GAA

The 2026 Louth Senior Football Championship is the 133rd edition of the premier Gaelic football tournament for senior graded clubs in County Louth, Ireland, organized by Louth GAA. The tournament consists of 12 teams, with the winner going on to represent the county in the Leinster Senior Club Football Championship. The championship began with a group stage and progresses to a knockout stage after the elimination of the four teams that finished bottom of their group.

Naomh Máirtín are the defending champions after defeating Newtown Blues in the 2025 Louth Senior Football Championship final, winning their 3rd senior title.

Hunterstown Rovers won the 2025 Louth Intermediate Football Championship, being promoted to the senior grade as a result.

The draw for the group stage of the championship was made on 16 February 2026.

== Team Changes ==
The following teams have changed division since the 2025 championship season:

=== To S.F.C. ===
Promoted from 2025 I.F.C.

- Hunterstown Rovers - (Intermediate Champions)

=== From S.F.C. ===
Relegated to 2026 I.F.C.

- Geraldines

== Participating Teams ==
The clubs participating in the 2026 Louth S.F.C are:

Club	Location	Manager(s)	2025 Championship Position	2026 Championship Position	Championship Titles (Pre 2026)	Last Championship Title (Pre 2026)
Cooley Kickhams	Cooley Peninsula		Quarter-Finalist	Quarter-Finalist	9	1990
Dreadnots	Clogherhead		Semi-Finalist	Relegation Semi-Finalist	0	—
Dundalk Gaels	Dundalk		Semi-Finalist	Quarter-Finalist	3	1952
Hunterstown Rovers	Ardee		I.F.C. Champions	Relegated to Intermediate	0	—
Naomh Máirtín	Monasterboice		Champions	Relegation Finalist	3	2025
Newtown Blues	Drogheda		Runners-Up	Champions	23	2019
Roche Emmets	Rathduff		Relegation Semi-Finalist	Relegation Semi-Finalist	2	1980
St Fechin's	Termonfeckin		Quarter-Finalist	Quarter-Finalist	2	1984
St Joseph's	Dromiskin		Relegation Finalist	Semi-Finalist	2	2006
St Mary's	Ardee		Quarter-Finalist	Semi-Finalist	13	2024
St Mochta's	Louth		Relegation Semi-Finalist	Runners-Up	0	—
St Patrick's	Lordship		Quarter-Finalist	Quarter-Finalist	7	2015

== Group Stage ==
=== Group 1 ===
Advance to knockout stage Advance to relegation play-off

Team	Matches				Score			Pts
Team	Pld	W	D	L	For	Against	Diff	Pts
St Joseph's	2	2	0	0	40	31	+9	4
St Fechin's	2	0	1	1	33	37	-4	1
Naomh Máirtín	2	0	1	1	24	29	-5	1

==== Round 1 ====
23 August 2026 Round 1	St Joseph's	4-12 (24) – (20) 2-14	St Fechin's	Dunleer
18:00 IST (UTC+1)		(HT: 3-07 – 1-06)		Venue: Páirc Uí Mhuirí
	Pts: Gabriel Bell 1-3, Conall McCaul 1-2 (1pen, 1f), Ben Collier 1-1, Cormac McKeown 1-0, Oisín Reidy 0-2, Ben McKeown 0-1, Craig Doherty 0-1, Alan Quigley 0-1, Conor Neary 0-1	Report	Pts: Evan Dolan 1-0, Evan McCluskey 1-0, James McGlew 0-3 (2f), Aaron McGlew 0-3 (1tpf), Ronan Holcroft 0-3 (1tp), Michael McGlew 0-2, Niall McDonnell 0-1, Harry Haughney 0-1, Ryan Walsh 0-1 (m),	Referee: Ultan McElroy (Kilkerley Emmets)

==== Round 2 ====
31 August 2026 Round 2	St Joseph's	0-16 (16) – (11) 1-08	Naomh Máirtín	Darver
20:00 IST (UTC+1)		(HT: 0-07 – 1-04)		Venue: Louth GAA Training Centre
	Pts: Conall McCaul 0-5 (1tp, 3f), Alan Quigley 0-4 (1f), Craig Doherty 0-2, Gabriel Bell 0-2, Ben McKeown 0-1, Conal Smyth 0-1, Pearse Grimes Murphy 0-1	Report	Pts: Darragh Dorian 1-2 (1pen), Wayne Campbell 0-2 (tpf), Jack Lynch 0-2 (tp), Dara McDonnell 0-1, Val Leddy 0-1	Referee: Bryan Smith (O'Raghallaighs)

==== Round 3 ====
6 September 2026 Round 3	Naomh Máirtín	1-10 (13) – (13) 0-13	St Fechin's	Ardee
14:00 IST (UTC+1)		(HT: 1-02 – 0-11)		Venue: DEFY Páirc Mhuire
	Pts: Wayne Campbell 0-5 (1f, 2tpf), Val Leddy 1-0, Dara McDonnell 0-2 (tp), Darragh Dorian 0-2, Ben Callanan 0-1	Report	Pts: James McGlew 0-4 (2tp), Michael McGlew 0-3 (1tp), Ronan Holcroft 0-2, Colm Hackett 0-1, Ryan Walsh 0-1, Aaron McGlew 0-1 (f), Evan Dolan 0-1	Referee: Damien Connor (St Patrick's)

=== Group 2 ===
Advance to knockout stage Advance to relegation play-off

Team	Matches				Score			Pts
Team	Pld	W	D	L	For	Against	Diff	Pts
St Mary's	2	1	0	1	39	34	+5	2
St Mochta's	2	1	0	1	35	32	+3	2
Hunterstown Rovers	2	1	0	1	24	32	-8	2

==== Round 1 ====
24 August 2026 Round 1	St Mary's	4-13 (25) – (17) 2-11	St Mochta's	Darver
20:00 IST (UTC+1)		(HT: 1-09 – 1-04)		Venue: Louth GAA Training Centre
	Pts: Conor Gillespie 2-0, Ciarán Keenan 1-1, Seán Callaghan 0-4 (2tp), Adam Gillespie 1-0 (pen), Daire McConnon 0-2, Tiernan Markey 0-2 (tp), Kian Moran 0-1, Keelin Martin 0-1, Evan Malone 0-1, Jonathan Commins 0-1 (f)	Report	Pts: Declan Byrne 0-6 (2tpf, 2f), Gerry Garland 1-2 (1tp), Andrew Lennon 1-0, Darren McMahon 0-1, Seán Flynn 0-1, Cormac Smyth 0-1	Referee: Paul Kneel (Kilkerley Emmets)

==== Round 2 ====
30 August 2026 Round 2	St Mary's	0-14 (14) – (17) 1-14	Hunterstown Rovers	Darver
19:30 IST (UTC+1)		(HT: 0-06 – 0-09)		Venue: Louth GAA Training Centre
	Pts: Tom Jackson 0-3, Tiernan Murphy 0-2 (tpf), Jonathan Commins 0-2 (tp), Keelin Martin 0-1, Seán Callaghan 0-1, Ciarán Keenan 0-1, Daire McConnon 0-1, Conor Gillespie 0-1, Liam Jackson 0-1, Carl Gillespie 0-1	Report	Pts: Ryan Burns 0-9 (2tpf, 4f), Sam Scott 1-0, Ciarán Russell 0-3 (1tp), Dean Burns 0-1, Colm Murphy 0-1	Referee: Colm McCullough (Naomh Fionnbarra)

==== Round 3 ====
6 September 2026 Round 3	Hunterstown Rovers	0-07 (7) – (18) 1-15	St Mochta's	Darver
19:30 IST (UTC+1)		(HT: 0-05 – 1-04)		Venue: Louth GAA Training Centre
	Pts: Ryan Burns 0-3 (1'45), James Russell 0-1, Dean Burns 0-1, Ciaran Russell 0-1, Ryan Ward 0-1	Report	Pts: Declan Byrne 0-6 (3f, 1tp), Shane Lennon 0-4, Danny Kindlon 1-0, Ciarán Byrne 0-2, Gerry Garland 0-2 (tp), Jamie Farrell 0-1	Referee: Ultan McElroy (Kilkerley Emmets)

=== Group 3 ===
Advance to knockout stage Advance to relegation play-off

Team	Matches				Score			Pts
Team	Pld	W	D	L	For	Against	Diff	Pts
Newtown Blues	2	1	0	1	43	37	+6	2
Cooley Kickhams	2	1	0	1	39	39	0	2
Dreadnots	2	1	0	1	41	47	-6	2

==== Round 1 ====
22 August 2026 Round 1	Newtown Blues	3-17 (26) – (19) 0-19	Dreadnots	Drogheda
18:30 IST (UTC+1)		(HT: 1-07 – 0-11)		Venue: Integral GAA Grounds
	Pts: Ciarán Downey 0-6 (2tpf, 1f), Andy McDonnell 1-1, Ewan Hoban 1-1, Eoin McCoy 1-1, Conor Branigan 0-4 (1tp), Liam Branigan 0-3, Conor MacCriosta 0-1	Report	Pts: Jay Hughes 0-5 (1tpf, 2f), James Califf 0-4 (2tp), Craig Shevlin 0-2 (tpf), Darragh Shevlin 0-2 (tp), Ciarán Finnegan 0-2, Conor Faulkner 0-2 (tp), Anthony Williams 0-1, Conor Clarke 0-1	Referee: David Fedigan (Hunterstown Rovers)

==== Round 2 ====
29 August 2026 Round 2	Newtown Blues	1-14 (17) – (18) 1-15	Cooley Kickhams	Haggardstown
20:00 IST (UTC+1)		(HT: 0-08 – 0-08)		Venue: Páirc Séamus Mhic hEochaidh
	Pts: Ciarán Downey 0-5 (1tp, 1tpf), Eoin McCoy 1-0 (pen), Conor MacCriosta 0-3 (1tp), Andy McDonnell 0-2, Ryan Kelly 0-1, Emmett Carolan 0-1, Conor Branigan 0-1, Jamie Kelly 0-1	Report	Pts: Niall Morgan 1-1, Cian Connor 0-4 (1tpf, 2f), Michael Rafferty 0-4 (3f), Fearghal Malone 0-2 (tp), Gerry Malone 0-1, Jack Long 0-1, Emmett Duffy 0-1, Paul Brennan 0-1	Referee: Stephen Johnson (Glen Emmets)

==== Round 3 ====
7 September 2026 Round 3	Cooley Kickhams	2-15 (21) – (22) 3-13	Dreadnots	Darver
20:00 IST (UTC+1)		(HT: 0-05 – 2-11)		Venue: Louth GAA Training Centre
	Pts: Joseph Hanlon 2-0, Fearghal Malone 0-6 (3tp), Enda O'Neill 0-3 (1tp), Michael Rafferty 0-3 (2f), Cian Connor 0-2, Gerard Hanlon 0-1	Report	Pts: Jay Hughes 3-1 (1-0f), Craig Shevlin 0-6 (1tpf, 1tp, 2f), James Califf 0-2 (tp), Sam Reilly 0-1, Conor Clarke 0-1, Paraic Smith 0-1, Darragh Shevlin 0-1	Referee: Stephen Murphy (Naomh Máirtín)

=== Group 4 ===
Advance to knockout stage Advance to relegation play-off

Team	Matches				Score			Pts
Team	Pld	W	D	L	For	Against	Diff	Pts
Dundalk Gaels	2	2	0	0	42	31	+11	4
St Patrick's	2	1	0	1	32	32	0	2
Roche Emmets	2	0	0	2	28	39	-11	0

==== Round 1 ====
23 August 2026 Round 1	Roche Emmets	1-15 (18) – (20) 1-17	Dundalk Gaels	Carlingford
14:00 IST (UTC+1)		(HT: 1-10 – 0-07)		Venue: Fr McEvoy Park
	Pts: Diarmuid Reilly 0-8 (4tpf), Shane Byrne 1-0, Barry O'Hare 0-2, David Quigley 0-1, Liam Dawe 0-1, James McDonnell 0-1, Daire Reilly 0-1, Evin Quigley 0-1	Report	Pts: Gerard McSorley 0-5 (1tp), Tony McDonnell 0-4 (1tp), Cain Bromley 1-0, Thomas O'Connell 0-3 (1'45), Dylan McKeown 0-2 (2f), Shaun Duffy 0-1, Jordan Keating 0-1, Michael Quinlivan 0-1	Referee: Colm McCullough (Naomh Fionnbarra)

==== Round 2 ====
30 August 2026 Round 2	Dundalk Gaels	2-16 (22) – (13) 0-13	St Patrick's	Haggardstown
17:00 IST (UTC+1)		(HT: 1-11 – 0-05)		Venue: Páirc Séamus Mhic hEochaidh
	Pts: Thomas O'Connell 2-8 (1tpf, 2f, 2'45), Jack Mullen 0-2 (tp), Shaun Duffy 0-2, Luke Murray 0-2, Jordan Keating 0-1, Gary Shevlin 0-1	Report	Pts: Jack Murphy 0-6 (6f), Aidan McCann 0-2, Martin McEneaney 0-2 (tpf), Leonard Grey 0-1, Michael O'Shaughnessy 0-1, Joe Connor 0-1	Referee: Stephen Murphy (Naomh Máirtín)

==== Round 3 ====
5 September 2026 Round 3	St Patrick's	1-16 (19) – (10) 0-10	Roche Emmets	Haggardstown
18:00 IST (UTC+1)		(HT: 0-08 – 0-06)		Venue: Páirc Séamus Mhic hEochaidh
	Pts: Tadhg O'Connor 1-2, Eoin O'Connor 0-5 (2tp), Jack Murphy 0-5 (3f), Joe Connor 0-3, Micheal O'Shaughnessy 0-1	Report	Pts: Diarmuid Reilly 0-6 (1tpf, 2f), Liam Dawe 0-1, James McDonnell 0-1, Shane Byrne 0-1, Daire Reilly 0-1 (f)	Referee: David J. McArdle (St Bride's)

== Relegation Playoffs ==
=== Relegation Semi-Finals ===
19 September 2026 Relegation Semi-Final	Hunterstown Rovers	2-14 (20) – (23) 1-20 (a.e.t.)	Roche Emmets	Darver
16:30 IST (UTC+1)		(HT: 0-04 – 0-03) (FT: 2-09 – 0-15)		Venue: Louth GAA Training Centre
	Pts: Ryan Ward 1-8 (1tpf, 4f), Aaron Levins 1-0, Ciarán Russell 0-3, Colm Murphy 0-1, Micheal Reid 0-1, Dean Burns 0-1	Report	Pts: Daire Reilly 0-4 (1tp, 1f), Diarmuid Reilly 0-4 (3f), Seán Dawe 1-0, Liam Dawe 0-3, Ryan Rice Martin 0-2 (tp), Mark Byrne 0-2, Barry O'Hare 0-2, Cathal Corcoran 0-2 (tp), Shane Byrne 0-1	Referee: Stephen Devlin (St Joseph's)

20 September 2026 Relegation Semi-Final	Naomh Máirtín	1-07 (10) – (12) 1-09	Dreadnots	Drogheda
12:00 IST (UTC+1)		(HT: 1-02 – 1-02)		Venue: Integral GAA Grounds
	Pts: Adam Booth 1-0, Joe McGrane 0-3, Dara McDonnell 0-2 (1f), Val Leddy 0-1, Darragh Dorian 0-1 (f)	Report	Pts: Paraic Smith 1-0, Donnacha Skinnader 0-3 (1tp), James Califf 0-2 (tpf), Anthony Williams 0-1, Ciarán Finnegan 0-1, Jay Hughes 0-1 (f), Callum Shevlin 0-1	Referee: Ultan McElroy (Kilkerley Emmets)

=== Relegation Final ===
24 October 2026 Relegation Final	Hunterstown Rovers	1-12 (15) – (21) 2-15	Naomh Máirtín	Darver
19:00 IST (UTC+1)		(HT: 0-07 – 1-04)		Venue: Louth GAA Training Centre
	Pts: Ryan Ward 1-4 (1tpf, 2f), Donovan Sheridan 0-3 (1tpf, 1f), Ryan Burns 0-2 (tp), Cillian Taaffe 0-1, Dean Burns 0-1, Sam Scott 0-1	Report	Pts: Tom Gray 1-3 (1tp), Dara McDonnell 0-5 (2tpf, 1f), Jack Murphy 0-4 (1tp), Evan Whelan 1-0, John Clutterbuck 0-2, Craig Callanan 0-1	Referee: Bryan Smith (O'Raghallaighs)

== Knockout Stage ==
=== Bracket ===
Quarter-finals
19 September, Haggardstown
St Mary's	0-21
St Fechin's	0-15
20 September, Darver
Newtown Blues	2-17
St Patrick's	1-14
21 September, Darver
Dundalk Gaels	0-23
St Mochta's	1-22
26 September, Dundalk
St Joseph's (AET)	1-14
Cooley Kickhams	0-12

Semi-finals
3 October, Haggardstown
St Mary's	2-11
Newtown Blues	1-15
4 October, Dundalk
St Mochta's	1-21
St Joseph's	0-08

Final
24 October, Drogheda
Newtown Blues	0-12
St Mochta's	0-11

=== Quarter-Finals ===
Fixtures for the quarter-finals were confirmed on 8 September 2026.

19 September 2026 Quarter-Final	St Mary's	0-21 (21) – (15) 0-15	St Fechin's	Haggardstown
19:00 IST (UTC+1)		(HT: 0-10 – 0-06)		Venue: Páirc Séamus Mhic hEochaidh
	Pts: Jonathan Commins 0-9 (2tp, 1f), Daire McConnon 0-4, Ciarán Keenan 0-3, Luke Keenan 0-2, Adam Gillespie 0-2 (1f), Seán Callaghan 0-1	Report	Pts: Ryan Walsh 0-10 (2tpf, 1tp, 1'45), Niall McDonnell 0-3 (1tpf, 1'45), Harry Haughney 0-2	Referee: David Fedigan (Hunterstown Rovers)

20 September 2026 Quarter-Final	St Joseph's	0-17 (17) – (17) 0-17	Cooley Kickhams	Dundalk
14:30 IST (UTC+1)		(HT: 0-11 – 0-04)		Venue: Páirc Naomh Bríd
	Pts: Craig Doherty 0-3, Ben McKeown 0-2 (tp), Conal McCaul 0-2 (1f), Ben Collier 0-2, Pearse Grimes Murphy 0-2, Alan Quigley 0-2 (1f), Conal Smyth 0-2 (1f), Gabriel Bell 0-1, Oisín Reidy 0-1	Report	Pts: Michael Rafferty 0-6 (1tp), Cian Connor 0-5 (1tpf, 1f, 1'45), Jack Long 0-2 (tp), Joseph Hanlon 0-2, Tiarnan Hanniffy 0-1, Seán Hoey 0-1	Referee: Stephen Johnson (Glen Emmets)

20 September 2026 Quarter-Final	Newtown Blues	2-17 (23) – (17) 1-14	St Patrick's	Darver
18:00 IST (UTC+1)		(HT: 1-07 – 1-09)		Venue: Louth GAA Training Centre
	Pts: Conor Mac Criosta 0-7 (1tp), Andy McDonnell 1-2, Ross Nally 1-0, Ciarán Downey 0-3 (1tp), Jamie Kelly 0-2, Daire Nally 0-1, Conor Branigan 0-1, Ewan Hoban 0-1	Report	Pts: Tadhg O'Connor 1-3, Jack Murphy 0-4 (1tpf, 1f), Michael O'Shaughnessy 0-2 (tp), Joe Connor 0-2 (1f), Aidan McCann 0-1, Seán Fearon 0-1, Eoin O'Connor 0-1	Referee: Paul Kneel (Kilkerley Emmets)

21 September 2026 Quarter-Final	Dundalk Gaels	0-23 (23) – (25) 1-22	St Mochta's	Darver
20:00 IST (UTC+1)		(HT: 0-11 – 0-12)		Venue: Louth GAA Training Centre
	Pts: Thomas O'Connell 0-6 (2tpf), Dylan McKeown 0-5 (1tp), Michael Quinlivan 0-5 (1tp), Tony McDonnell 0-2 (tp), Jack Mullen 0-2 (tp), Luke Murray 0-1, Chris Sweeney 0-1, Liam O'Connor 0-1	Report	Pts: Shane Lennon 1-3 (1'45), Ciarán Byrne 0-6 (2tp), Gerry Garland 0-4 (1tp), Declan Byrne 0-4 (1tpf, 2f), Danny Kindlon 0-2, Ben Goss Kieran 0-1, Seán Flynn 0-1, Dylan Farrell 0-1	Referee: Damien Connor (St Patrick's)

=== Quarter-Final Replay ===
26 September 2026 Quarter-Final Replay	St Joseph's	1-14 (17) – (12) 0-12 (a.e.t.)	Cooley Kickhams	Dundalk
15:00 IST (UTC+1)		(HT: 1-3 – 0-06) (FT: 1-08 – 0-11)		Venue: Páirc Naomh Bríd
	Pts: Conall McCaul 0-6 (1tp), Pearse Grimes Murphy 1-2, Ben McKeown 0-1, Oisín Reidy 0-1, Ben Collier 0-1, Conal Smyth 0-1, Oisín McGuinness 0-1, Conor Neary 0-1	Report	Pts: Cian Connor 0-5 (1tp, 1f), Michael Rafferty 0-3 (2f), Fearghal Malone 0-2 (tp), Niall Morgan 0-2 (tp)	Referee: Stephen Murphy (Naomh Máirtín)

=== Semi-Finals ===
3 October 2026 Semi-Final	Newtown Blues	1-15 (18) – (17) 2-11	St Mary's	Haggardstown
17:30 IST (UTC+1)		(HT: 0-09 – 0-05)		Venue: Páirc Séamus Mhic hEochaidh
	Pts: Ciarán Downey 0-6 (1tpf, 3f), Andy McDonnell 0-4, Liam Branigan 1-0, Conor Mac Criosta 0-3 (1tp), Jamie Kelly 0-1, Ross Nally 0-1	Report	Pts: Keelin Martin 1-2, Ciarán Keenan 1-1, Carl Gillespie 0-3 (3f), Tiernan Markey 0-1 (f), Donal McKenny 0-1, Eimhin Keenan 0-1, Daire McConnon 0-1, Kian Moran 0-1	Referee: Colm McCullough (Naomh Fionnbarra)

4 October 2026 Semi-Final	St Mochta's	1-21 (24) – (8) 0-08	St Joseph's	Dundalk
17:00 IST (UTC+1)		(HT: 1-11 – 0-04)		Venue: Páirc Naomh Bríd
	Pts: Ben Goss Kieran 1-1, Gerry Garland 0-4 (2tp), Declan Byrne 0-4 (1tp, 1f), Danny Kindlon 0-4, Jamie Farrell 0-2, Ciarán Byrne 0-2, Shane Lennon 0-2, Darren McMahon 0-1, Seán Flynn 0-1	Report	Pts: Oisín McGuinness 0-3 (2f), David Kieran 0-1, Oisín Reidy 0-1, Alan Quigley 0-1 (f), Rory McLoughlin 0-1, Craig Doherty 0-1	Referee: Ultan McElroy (Kilkerley Emmets)

=== Final ===
18 October 2026
15:30 IST (UTC+1)
Final

Report

Newtown Blues	1-15 (18) – (18) 1-15	St Mochta's
(HT: 0-07 – 1-04)
Pts: Ross Nally 0-5 (1tp), Emmett Carolan 1-0, Conor Branigan 0-3, Jamie Kelly 0-3 (1f), Conor Mac Criosta 0-2 (tp), Liam Branigan 0-1, Andy McDonnell 0-1		Pts: Declan Byrne 0-10 (2tpf, 6f), Gerry Garland 1-0, Ciarán Byrne 0-2, Ben Goss Kieran 0-1, Seán Flynn 0-1, Shane Lennon 0-1

Integral GAA Grounds, Drogheda
Referee: Stephen Johnson (Glen Emmets)

==== Replay ====
24 October 2026
15:30 IST (UTC+1)
Final

Report

Newtown Blues	0-12 (12) – (11) 0-11	St Mochta's
(HT: 0-06 – 0-06)
Pts: Ciarán Downey 0-5 (2f), Jamie Kelly 0-4 (1tp), Conor Mac Criosta 0-1, Ross Nally 0-1, Conor Moore 0-1		Pts: Declan Byrne 0-5 (2f), Gerry Garland 0-3 (1tp), Ben Goss Kieran 0-2, Ciarán Byrne 0-1

Integral GAA Grounds, Drogheda
Referee: Damien Connor (St Patrick's)

Newtown Blues	St Mochta's
