= Colm Judge =

Irish Gaelic footballer

Personal information
- Native name: Colm Mac an Bhreitheamhan (Irish)
- Born: Drogheda, Ireland
- Occupation: Teacher

Sport
- Sport: Gaelic Football
- Position: Centre-forward
Club
- Years: Club
- 2003-: Newtown Blues
Club titles
- Louth titles: 5
Inter-county
- Years: County
- 2006-2016: Louth
Inter-county titles
- NFL: 2

Colm Judge is an Irish sportsperson. He plays Gaelic football with his local club Newtown Blues and was a member of the Louth senior inter-county team for several years from 2006. Judge is regarded as one of Louth's top gaelic footballers of recent times.

He was part of the Louth team that reached the final of the Leinster Senior Football Championship in 2010, but were beaten in controversial circumstances by Meath. Judge helped Louth to win the Tommy Murphy Cup in 2006 and two National League titles in 2011 and 2016. He is the son of former Louth footballer Eugene Judge. At club level he has won the Louth Senior Football Championship on five occasions with Newtown Blues.

== Honours ==
County

- Tommy Murphy Cup (1): 2006
- National Football League Division 3 (1): 2011
- National Football League Division 4 (1): 2016

Club

- Louth Senior Football Championship (5): 2008, 2013, 2017, 2018, 2019
- Louth Senior Football League (4): 2005, 2010, 2018, 2022
- Paddy Sheelan Cup (4): 2007, 2012, 2015, 2022
- Louth Minor Football Championship (1): 2004
- Louth Under-21 Football Championship (2): 2004, 2005
