= 2019 Louth Senior Football Championship =

Gaelic football tournament

Tournament details
- County: Louth
- Year: 2019
- Trophy: Joe Ward Cup
- Sponsor: Anchor Tours
- Date: July – October 2019
- Teams: 12
- Defending champions: Newtown Blues

Winners
- Champions: Newtown Blues (23rd win)
- Manager: Ronan Phillips
- Captain: Emmet Carolan
- Qualify for: Leinster Club SFC

Runners-up
- Runners-up: Naomh Máirtín
- Manager: Jim Farrell
- Captain: Mick Fanning

Promotion/Relegation
- Relegated team(s): Seán O'Mahony's

The 2019 Louth Senior Football Championship is the 126th edition of the Louth GAA's premier club Gaelic football tournament for senior graded teams in County Louth, Ireland. The tournament consists of 12 teams, with the winner going on to represent Louth in the Leinster Senior Club Football Championship. The championship starts with a group stage and then progresses to a knock out stage.

Newtown Blues were the defending champions for the second time in a row after defeating Naomh Máirtín in the previous years final. They successfully defended their crown to claim a "3-in-a-row" of S.F.C. titles and their 23rd overall when defeating the same opposition by 2-9 to 1-9 at Drogheda Park on 20 October 2019.

This was the return of St Mochta's to the senior grade after at 37 year absence (they were relegated from the S.F.C. to the I.F.C. back in 1982) when claiming the 2018 Louth Intermediate Football Championship title with a final victory over St Fechin's.

Seán O'Mahony's were relegated to the I.F.C. for 2020 after a 5 year spell in the top-flight when losing to the O'Connell's in the relegation final. Since winning 2014 I.F.C. the Point Road club reached two senior finals in 2015 and 2016, winning the latter against St Mary's.

== Team changes ==
The following teams changed division since the 2018 championship season.

=== To S.F.C. ===
Promoted from 2018 Louth Intermediate Football Championship

- St Mochta's - (Intermediate Champions)

=== From S.F.C. ===
Relegated to 2019 Louth Intermediate Football Championship

- Kilkerley Emmets

== Group stage ==
There were 4 groups called Group A, B, C and D. The top two finishers in each group qualified for the quarter-finals. The bottom finishers of each group qualified for the relegation play-off.

=== Group A ===
Team	Pld	W	L	D	PF	PA	PD	Pts
Newtown Blues	2	2	0	0	35	19	+16	4
St Mochta's	2	1	1	0	28	28	+0	2
Dundalk Gaels	2	0	2	0	17	33	-16	0

Round 1

- St Mochta's 1-13, 0-10 Dundalk Gaels, Dowdallshill, 14/7/2019,

Round 2

- Newtown Blues 1-15, 0-12 St Mochta's, Castlebellingham, 21/7/2019,

Round 3

- Newtown Blues 0-17, 0-7 Dundalk Gaels, Dunleer, 28/7/2019,

=== Group B ===
Team	Pld	W	L	D	PF	PA	PD	Pts
St Mary's	2	2	0	0	39	33	+6	4
O'Raghallaighs	2	1	1	0	42	30	+12	2
O'Connell's	2	0	2	0	24	42	-18	0

Round 1

- St Mary's 2-14, 3-10 O'Raghallaighs, Dunleer, 14/7/2019,

Round 2

- St Mary's 1-16, 0-14 O'Connell's, Dunleer, 21/7/2019,

Round 3

- O'Raghallaighs 3-14, 0-10 O'Connell's, Dunleer, 28/7/2019,

=== Group C ===
Team	Pld	W	L	D	PF	PA	PD	Pts
Dreadnots	2	1	0	1	30	26	+4	3
St Patrick's	2	1	1	0	27	27	+0	2
Seán O'Mahony's	2	0	1	1	21	25	-4	1

Round 1

- Dreadnots 1-15, 0-14 St Patrick's, Castlebellingham, 14/7/2019,

Round 2

- Dreadnots 0-12, 0-12 Seán O'Mahony's, Dowdallshill, 20/7/2019,

Round 3

- St Patrick's 0-13, 0-9 Seán O'Mahony's, Dunleer, 27/7/2019,

=== Group D ===
Team	Pld	W	L	D	PF	PA	PD	Pts
Naomh Máirtín	2	2	0	0	30	23	+7	4
Geraldines	2	1	1	0	26	25	+1	2
St Joseph's	2	0	2	0	25	32	-8	0

Round 1

- Naomh Máirtín 2-12, 1-9 St Joseph's, Dunleer, 14/7/2019,

Round 2

- Naomh Máirtín 0-12, 1-8 Geraldines, Dunleer, 21/7/2019,

Round 3

- Geraldines 1-12, 0-13 St Joseph's, Ecco Road, 28/7/2019,

== Knock-out stages ==
=== Relegation play-off ===
The four bottom finishers from each group qualify for the relegation play off. The team to lose both matches will be relegated to the 2019 Intermediate Championship.

16 August 2019; Relegation semi-final	St Joseph's	0-13 - 1-8	O'Connell's	Haggardstown

16 August 2019; Relegation semi-final	Dundalk Gaels	0-12 - 0-9	Seán O'Mahony's	Haggardstown

24 August 2019; Relegation final	O'Connell's	0-11 - 0-10	Seán O'Mahony's	Haggardstown

=== Finals ===
The winners and runners up of each group qualified for the quarter finals.

Quarter-finals		Semi-finals		Final
Naomh Máirtín	4-13
St Mochta's	1-15	Naomh Máirtín	2-10
Geraldines	0-12	Geraldines	0-10
St Mary's	0-9			Naomh Máirtín	1-09
Dreadnots	1-21			Newtown Blues	2-09
O'Raghallaighs	3-9	Dreadnots	0-11
Newtown Blues	3-14	Newtown Blues	1-09
St Patrick's	1-6

== Quarter-finals ==
17 August 2019; 17:30	Naomh Máirtín	4-13 - 1-15	St Mochta's	Dunleer; Referee: Brian Brady
17 August 2019; 17:30	Sam Mulroy 2-3 (0-2f), JP Rooney 0-5, Stephen Campbell 1-1, Bryan McQuillan 1-0, Wayne Campbell 0-2, Conor Morgan 0-1, John Clutterbuck 0-1		Declan Byrne 0-6 (0-5f), Ciarán McMahon 0-5 (0-5f), Eamon O’Neill 1-1, Ciarán Byrne 0-2, Philip Englishby 0-1	Dunleer; Referee: Brian Brady

17 August 2019; 19:00	Geraldines	0-12 - 0-9	St Mary's	Dunleer; Referee: Paul Kneel
17 August 2019; 19:00	Jim McEneaney 0-8 (0-6f), Dara Hamill 0-3, Ryan Trainor 0-1, Matthew Corcoran 0-1		Darren Clarke 0-3 (0-3f), Kian Moran 0-2, Ronan Carroll 0-2 (0-1f), Niall Eccles 0-1, Ciarán Keenan 0-1, Mark Fay 0-1	Dunleer; Referee: Paul Kneel

25 August 2019; 17:00	Dreadnots	1-21 - 3-9	O'Raghallaighs	Castlebellingham; Referee: Stephen Murphy
25 August 2019; 17:00	James Califf 0-7 (0-5f), Nathan Sutherland 1-3, Jay Hughes 0-4 (0-4f), Pat Lynch 0-2, Liam Shevlin 0-2, Peter Kirwan 0-2, Conor Faulkner 0-1		Ben Rogan 2-1 (1-0p), Chris Smith 1-0, Barry Flanagan 0-3 (0-3f), Eoin Moore 0-2, Ruairi Moore 0-2, Daniel Morgan 0-1	Castlebellingham; Referee: Stephen Murphy

25 August 2019; 18:30	Newtown Blues	3-14 - 1-6	St Patrick's	Castlebellingham; Referee: Jonathan Conlon
25 August 2019; 18:30	Ciarán Downey 1-4 (0-3f), Ross Nally 1-2, Emmet Carolan 1-0 (1-0p), Jamie Kelly 0-2, Colm Judge 0-2 (0-2f), Dáire Nally 0-1, Hugh McGinn 0-1, Conor Moore 0-1, John Kermode 0-1		Aidan McCann 1-0, Tadhg O’Connor 0-2, Cathal Grogan 0-2 (0-2f), Evan White 0-1, Paddy Keenan 0-1 (0-1f)	Castlebellingham; Referee: Jonathan Conlon

== Semi-finals ==
21 September 2019; 20:30	Naomh Máirtín	2-10 - 0-10	Geraldines	Stabannon; Referee: Thomas Brennan
21 September 2019; 20:30	Sam Mulroy 2-4 (0-2f), Stephen Campbell 0-2, J.P. Rooney 0-2, Bryan McQuillan 0-1, Conor Whelan 0-1		Jim McEneaney 0-6 (0-4f), Seán McEneaney 0-1, Tiarnan Hand 0-1, James Craven 0-1, Matthew Corcoran 0-1	Stabannon; Referee: Thomas Brennan

22 September 2019	Newtown Blues	1-9 - 0-11	Dreadnots	The Grove Castlebellingham; Referee: David J McArdle
22 September 2019	Ciarán Downey 0-3, H McGinn 1-0, Andy McDonnell 0-1, Alan Connor 0-1, Colm Judge 0-1, Robert Carr 0-1, Ross Nally 0-1, C Branigan 0-1		Páraic Smith 0-4, James Califf 0-3, Pat Lynch 0-2, A Lynch 0-1, David O’Brien 0-1	The Grove Castlebellingham; Referee: David J McArdle

== Final ==
Originally scheduled for 13 October, the Louth S.F.C. final at Drogheda Park was postponed. It's understood the pitch was playable, but in the interest of spectator safety, with the grass bank soaked, the decision to call off the matches was taken. The final was re-fixed for the following Sunday.

20 October 2019	Newtown Blues	2-9 - 1-9	Naomh Máirtín	Drogheda Park, Louth
20 October 2019		Report		Drogheda Park, Louth
