= 2025 Louth Intermediate Football Championship =

Gaelic football tournament

Tournament details
- County: Louth
- Year: 2025
- Trophy: Séamus Flood Cup
- Sponsor: CTI Business Solutions
- Date: 23 August 2025 - 19 October 2025
- Teams: 12

Winners
- Champions: Hunterstown Rovers
- Captain: Ryan Burns
- Qualify for: Leinster Club IFC

Runners-up
- Runners-up: Stabannon Parnells

The 2025 Louth Intermediate Football Championship was the 56th edition of the premier Gaelic football tournament for Intermediate graded clubs in County Louth, Ireland, organized by Louth GAA. The tournament consisted of 12 teams, with the winner going on to represent the county in the Leinster Intermediate Club Football Championship. The championship began with a group stage and progressed to a knockout stage after the elimination of the four teams that finished bottom of their group. The draw for the tournament took place at Aiken Barracks in Dundalk on 19 March 2025.

Hunterstown Rovers emerged as champions and will play in the 2026 Louth Senior Football Championship.

== Team changes ==
Dundalk Gaels were promoted to Senior football for 2025 as winners of the 2024 Intermediate Championship. They replaced St Bride's, who lost the 2024 Senior Championship Relegation play-off to St Fechin's. 2024 Louth Junior Football Championship winners Wolfe Tones gained promotion to the Intermediate grade, while Glyde Rangers were relegated to Junior football after losing the 2024 Intermediate relegation play-off to Dundalk Young Irelands.

== Group stage ==
=== Group 1 ===
Team	Pld	W	L	D	PF	PA	PD	Pts
Glen Emmets	2	2	0	0	38	34	4	4
St Kevin's	2	1	1	0	39	38	1	2
Dundalk Young Irelands	2	0	2	0	39	44	-5	0

Round 1

24 August 2025	St Kevin's	4–12 (24) – 3–11 (20)	Dundalk Young Irelands	The Grove

Round 2

31 August 2025	Glen Emmets	1–15 (18) – 0–15 (15)	St Kevin's	Páirc Baile Fiach

Round 3

6 September 2025	Glen Emmets	2–14 (20) – 1–16 (19)	Dundalk Young Irelands	Stabannon

=== Group 2 ===
Team	Pld	W	L	D	PF	PA	PD	Pts
Stabannon Parnells	2	2	0	0	51	36	15	4
St Bride's	2	1	1	0	41	36	5	2
O'Raghallaighs	2	0	2	0	33	53	-20	0

Round 1

24 August 2025	O'Raghallaighs	0–13 (13) – 3–16 (25)	St Bride's	McGeough Park

Round 2

29 August 2025	Stabannon Parnells	1–20 (23) – 1–13 (16)	St Bride's	Darver

Round 3

5 September 2025	Stabannon Parnells	2–22 (28) – 3–11 (20)	O'Raghallaighs	Darver

=== Group 3 ===
Team	Pld	W	L	D	PF	PA	PD	Pts
Mattock Rangers	2	2	0	0	51	31	20	4
Clan na Gael	2	1	1	0	39	46	-7	2
Kilkerley Emmets	2	0	2	0	29	42	-13	0

Round 1

25 August 2025	Clan na Gael	2–14 (20) – 0–17 (17)	Kilkerley Emmets	Darver

Round 2

31 August 2025	Mattock Rangers	4–17 (29) – 1–16 (19)	Clan na Gael	Páirc na nGael

Round 3

7 September 2025	Mattock Rangers	1–19 (22) – 0–12 (12)	Kilkerley Emmets	McGeough Park

=== Group 4 ===
Team	Pld	W	L	D	PF	PA	PD	Pts
Hunterstown Rovers	2	2	0	0	42	18	24	4
Seán O'Mahony's	2	1	1	0	40	27	13	2
Wolfe Tones	2	0	2	0	10	47	-37	0

Round 1

23 August 2025	Seán O'Mahony's	2–20 (26) – 0–06 (6)	Wolfe Tones	Stabannon

Round 2

30 August 2025	Hunterstown Rovers	2–15 (21) – 1–11 (14)	Seán O'Mahony's	Darver

Round 3

7 September 2025	Hunterstown Rovers	3–12 (21) – 0–04 (4)	Wolfe Tones	Dreadnots

=== Relegation Play-Off Semi-finals ===
19 September 2025	Dundalk Young Irelands	1–08 (11) – 3–12 (21)	Kilkerley Emmets	Darver

20 September 2025	O'Raghallaighs	4–10 (22) – 0–11 (11)	Wolfe Tones	Páirc Naomh Máirtín

=== Relegation Play-Off Final ===
9 October 2025	Dundalk Young Irelands	1–11 (14) – 2–10 (16)	Wolfe Tones	McGeough Park

- Dundalk Young Irelands are relegated to Junior football for 2026.

== Knockout stage ==
=== Quarter-finals ===
20 September 2025	Glen Emmets	0–12 (12) – 1–16 (19)	Clan na Gael	Darver

21 September 2025	Hunterstown Rovers	0–12 (12) – 1–07 (10)	St Kevin's	Integral GAA Grounds

21 September 2025	Mattock Rangers	2–16 (22) – 1–11 (14)	St Bride's	Darver

22 September 2025	Stabannon Parnells	0–11 (11) – 0–07 (7)	Seán O'Mahony's	Darver

=== Semi-finals ===
5 October 2025	Stabannon Parnells	1–16 (19) – 1–06 (9)	Clan na Gael	McGeough Park

5 October 2025	Mattock Rangers	0–17 (17) – 1–14 (17)	Hunterstown Rovers	DEFY Páirc Mhuire

9 October 2025 replay	Hunterstown Rovers	2–18 (24) – 3–11 (20)	Mattock Rangers	Stabannon

=== Final ===
19 October 2025	Stabannon Parnells	0–15 (15) – 2–10 (16)	Hunterstown Rovers	DEFY Páirc Mhuire
