= Louth Under-19 Football Championship =

Annual underage GAA football competition

- Founded: 2023
- Sponsors: Anglo Printers

The Louth Under-19 Football Championship was an annual competition organised by Louth GAA for Gaelic football teams in County Louth.

== History ==
The competition was introduced to the Louth GAA calendar in 2023 and replaced the former Under-21 Championship. The aim was to bridge a perceived gap between underage and adult competitions and reduce player drop-off. As is the case nationally with underage football, amalgamated parish teams were a feature of the competition due to lack of numbers.

== 2023 ==
=== Format ===
The fifteen teams that entered the competition were divided into four groups. Two points were awarded for a win. The four teams that finished top of their group qualified for the semi-finals.

=== Group 1 ===
(i) Baile Talún (ii) Mattock Rangers/Hunterstown Rovers (iii) O'Connells/Stabannon Parnells/John Mitchels (iv) Oliver Plunketts/Wolfe Tones

=== Group 2 ===
(i) Geraldines (ii) Naomh Máirtín (iii) St Patrick's

=== Group 3 ===
(i) Cooley Kickhams (ii) St Fechin's (iii) St Mary's (iv) Roche Emmets

=== Group 4 ===
(i) Dundalk Gaels (ii) Naomh Fionnbarra (iii) St Joseph's (iv) St Kevin's

=== First Round ===
12 November	O'Connells/Stabannon Parnells/John Mitchels	0-05 - 4-12	Mattock Rangers/Hunterstown Rovers

12 November	Baile Talún	3-05 - 1-04	Oliver Plunketts/Wolfe Tones

12 November	St Mary's	CONC - 0-00	St Fechin's

3 December	Roche Emmets	0-05 - 3-12	Cooley Kickhams

12 November	St Patrick's	2-08 - 3-05	Geraldines

12 November	Dundalk Gaels	2-09 - 1-03	St Joseph's

=== Second Round ===
19 November	Oliver Plunketts/Wolfe Tones	0-00 - CONC	O'Connells/Stabannon Parnells/John Mitchels

19 November	Mattock Rangers/Hunterstown Rovers	2-18 - 2-04	Baile Talún

19 November	Cooley Kickhams	3-11 - 1-05	St Fechin's

29 November	St Mary's	CONC - 0-00	Roche Emmets

19 November	Geraldines	1-11 - 2-05	Naomh Máirtín

19 November	St Joseph's	5-08 - 1-09	St Kevin's

19 November	Naomh Fionnbarra	0-03 - 2-10	Dundalk Gaels

=== Third Round ===
26 November	Mattock Rangers/Hunterstown Rovers	8-13 - 0-05	Oliver Plunketts/Wolfe Tones

26 November	St Mary's	1-10 - 2-17	Cooley Kickhams

26 November	Dundalk Gaels	7-13 - 2-08	St Kevin's

26 November	Roche Emmets	1-04 - 2-08	St Fechin's

26 November	Naomh Máirtín	1-14 - 2-11	St Patrick's

26 November	Naomh Fionnbarra	0-09 - 3-07	St Joseph's

=== Semi-Finals ===
10 December	Mattock Rangers/Hunterstown Rovers	1-12 - 1-08	Cooley Kickhams

10 December	Dundalk Gaels	3-12 - 1-01	Geraldines

=== Final ===
Date	Winner	Score	Opponent	Score	Captain	Venue
16 December	Mattock Rangers/Hunterstown Rovers	1–19	Dundalk Gaels	0-08	Aaron Levins	Darver

== 2024 ==
=== Format ===
The nineteen teams that entered the competition were divided into four groups. Two points were awarded for a win. The four teams that finished top of their group qualified for the semi-finals.

=== Group 1 ===
(i) Cúchulainn Gaels (ii) Geraldines (iii) Kilkerley Emmets/Naomh Malachi (iv) Newtown Blues (v) Roche Emmets

=== Group 2 ===
(i) Dreadnots (ii) Naomh Máirtín (iii) O'Raghallaighs (iv) St Kevin's (v) St Mary's

=== Group 3 ===
(i) Baile Talún (ii) Mattock Rangers/Hunterstown Rovers (iii) Naomh Fionnbarra (iv) St Fechin's (v) St Mochta's/St Joseph's

=== Group 4 ===
(i) Cooley Kickhams (ii) Dundalk Gaels (iii) Glen Emmets (iv) St Patrick's

=== First Round ===
3 November	Cúchulainn Gaels	1-07 - 3-15	Roche Emmets

3 November	Geraldines	1-12 - 0-03	Kilkerley Emmets/Naomh Malachi

6 November	St Mary's	CONC - 0-00	Naomh Máirtín

3 November	St Kevin's	2-05 - 5-10	Dreadnots

3 November	Mattock Rangers/Hunterstown Rovers	3-07 - 2-11	Baile Talún

3 November	Naomh Fionnbarra	2-08 - 3-14	St Fechin's

3 December	St Patrick's	1-08 - 3-08	Cooley Kickhams

20 November	Glen Emmets	0-06 - 0-09	Dundalk Gaels

=== Second Round ===
10 November	Newtown Blues	5-11 - 2-09	Geraldines

10 November	Kilkerley Emmets/Naomh Malachi	2-11 - 0-11	Cúchulainn Gaels

10 November	Dreadnots	0-00 - CONC	St Mary's

10 November	O'Raghallaighs	0-00 - CONC	St Kevin's

10 November	St Fechin's	1-18 - 0-09	Mattock Rangers/Hunterstown Rovers

10 November	St Mochta's/St Joseph's	5-10 - 4-12	Naomh Fionnbarra

24 November	Cooley Kickhams	1-15 - 0-04	Glen Emmets

24 November	Dundalk Gaels	0-07 - 0-07	St Patrick's

=== Third Round ===
15 November	Cúchulainn Gaels	1-09 - 1-19	Newtown Blues

17 November	Roche Emmets	2-15 - 0-08	Kilkerley Emmets/Naomh Malachi

17 November	Naomh Máirtín	4-07 - 1-13	Dreadnots

17 November	St Mary's	CONC - 0-00	O'Raghallaighs

17 November	St Mochta's/St Joseph's	0-00 - CONC	Mattock Rangers/Hunterstown Rovers

17 November	Baile Talún	1-10 - 2-07	St Fechin's

1 December	Dundalk Gaels	2-11 - 1-14	Cooley Kickhams

1 December	St Patrick's	0-00 - CONC	Glen Emmets

=== Fourth Round ===
22 November	Geraldines	5-09 - 2-10	Cúchulainn Gaels

22 November	Newtown Blues	3-10 - 2-03	Roche Emmets

24 November	St Kevin's	0-00 - CONC	St Mary's

24 November	O'Raghallaighs	1-04 - 1-14	Naomh Máirtín

24 November	St Mochta's/St Joseph's	2-13 - 2-07	Baile Talún

24 November	Mattock Rangers/Hunterstown Rovers	CONC - 0-00	Naomh Fionnbarra

=== Fifth Round ===
1 December	Roche Emmets	CONC - 0-00	Geraldines

1 December	Kilkerley Emmets/Naomh Malachi	1-08 - 5-21	Newtown Blues

1 December	Naomh Máirtín	0-00 - CONC	St Kevin's

1 December	O'Raghallaighs	1-08 - 1-11	Dreadnots

1 December	Baile Talún	3-07 - 0-13	Naomh Fionnbarra

1 December	St Fechin's	0-09 - 3-05	St Mochta's/St Joseph's

=== Summary of Group stage ===
The 100% record of Newtown Blues in Group A meant that they qualified for the semi-finals, as did Group B winners Naomh Máirtín. The St Mochta's/St Joseph's combination won Group C by three points and picked up the third semi-final slot. Cooley Kickhams, winners of a tight Group D by one point, complete the semi-final lineup.

=== Semi-Finals ===
6 December	St Mochta's/St Joseph's	2-07 - 1-11	Newtown Blues	Darver

8 December	Cooley Kickhams	2-12 - 1-07	Naomh Máirtín	Fr. McEvoy Park

=== Final ===
Date	Winner	Score	Opponent	Score	Captain	Venue
14 December	Cooley Kickhams	2-09	Newtown Blues	1-07	Cian McGuinness	Darver
