= 2024 Louth Intermediate Football Championship =

Gaelic football tournament

Tournament details
- County: Louth
- Year: 2024
- Trophy: Séamus Flood Cup
- Sponsor: CTI Business Solutions
- Date: 17 August - 19 October 2024
- Teams: 12

Winners
- Champions: Dundalk Gaels
- Manager: Kevin McKernan
- Captain: Dylan McKeown
- Qualify for: Leinster Club IFC

Runners-up
- Runners-up: Hunterstown Rovers

The 2024 Louth Intermediate Football Championship was the 55th edition of the premier Gaelic football tournament for Intermediate graded clubs in County Louth, Ireland, organized by Louth GAA. The tournament consisted of 12 teams, with the winner going on to represent the county in the Leinster Intermediate Club Football Championship. The championship began with a group stage and progressed to a knockout stage after the elimination of the four teams that finished bottom of their group. The draw for the tournament took place at Louth GAA headquarters in Darver on 29 February 2024.

Dundalk Gaels emerged as champions for a record fifth time and will play in the 2025 Louth Senior Football Championship.

== Team changes ==
Roche Emmets were promoted to Senior football for 2024 as winners of the 2023 Intermediate Championship. They replaced Dundalk Gaels, who lost the 2023 Senior Championship Relegation play-off to St Fechin's. 2023 Louth Junior Football Championship winners Glyde Rangers gained promotion to the Intermediate grade, while O'Connells were relegated to Junior football after losing the 2023 Intermediate relegation play-off to Dundalk Young Irelands.

== Group stage ==
=== Group 1 ===
Team	Pld	W	L	D	PF	PA	PD	Pts
Seán O'Mahony's	2	2	0	0	30	23	+7	4
Clan na Gael	2	1	1	0	24	24	0	2
Glen Emmets	2	0	2	0	19	26	-7	0

Round 1

17 August 2024	Clan na Gael	1–09 (12) – 1–13 (16)	Seán O'Mahony's	St Brigid's Park

Round 2

23 August 2024	Glen Emmets	0–11 (11) – 2–08 (14)	Seán O'Mahony's	Darver

Round 3

31 August 2024	Glen Emmets	0–08 (8) – 0–12 (12)	Clan na Gael	McGeough Park

=== Group 2 ===
Team	Pld	W	L	D	PF	PA	PD	Pts
Hunterstown Rovers	2	2	0	0	39	30	+9	4
O'Raghallaighs	2	1	1	0	41	37	+4	2
Dundalk Young Irelands	2	0	2	0	25	38	-13	0

Round 1

18 August 2024	Hunterstown Rovers	1–11 (14) – 2–07 (13)	Dundalk Young Irelands	Darver

Round 2

24 August 2024	O'Raghallaighs	3–08 (17) – 2–19 (25)	Hunterstown Rovers	Darver

Round 3

31 August 2024	O'Raghallaighs	3–15 (24) – 2–06 (12)	Dundalk Young Irelands	Páirc Uí Mhuirí

=== Group 3 ===
Team	Pld	W	L	D	PF	PA	PD	Pts
Mattock Rangers	2	1	0	1	36	15	+21	3
Dundalk Gaels	2	1	0	1	21	10	+11	3
Glyde Rangers	2	0	2	0	13	45	-32	0

Round 1

18 August 2024	Mattock Rangers	5–15 (30) – 0–09 (9)	Glyde Rangers	Páirc Baile Fiach

Round 2

24 August 2024	Dundalk Gaels	0–06 (6) – 0–06 (6)	Mattock Rangers	Páirc Mochta

Round 3

31 August 2024	Dundalk Gaels	2–09 (15) – 0–04 (4)	Glyde Rangers	Darver

=== Group 4 ===
Team	Pld	W	L	D	PF	PA	PD	Pts
Kilkerley Emmets	2	2	0	0	23	16	+7	4
St Kevin's	2	1	1	0	23	24	-1	2
Stabannon Parnells	2	0	2	0	21	27	-6	0

Round 1

17 August 2024	St Kevin's	0–07 (7) – 1–09 (12)	Kilkerley Emmets	Darver

Round 2

24 August 2024	Stabannon Parnells	1–06 (9) – 1–08 (11)	Kilkerley Emmets	Páirc Baile Fiach

Round 3

31 August 2024	Stabannon Parnells	1–09 (12) – 2–10 (16)	St Kevin's	Páirc Mhuire

=== Relegation Play-Off Semi-finals ===
14 September 2024	Dundalk Young Irelands	1–05 (8) – 1–08 (11)	Stabannon Parnells	Darver

14 September 2024	Glen Emmets	1–05 (8) – 0–07 (7)	Glyde Rangers	Páirc Uí Mhuirí

=== Relegation Play-Off Final ===
27 September 2024	Glyde Rangers	0–07 (7) – 3–13 (22)	Dundalk Young Irelands	Darver

- Glyde Rangers are relegated to Junior football for 2025.

== Knockout stage ==
=== Quarter-finals ===
15 September 2024	Seán O'Mahony's	1–11 (14) – 1–08 (11)	O'Raghallaighs	The Grove

15 September 2024	Hunterstown Rovers	0–11 (11) – 0–07 (7)	St Kevin's	Darver

15 September 2024	Mattock Rangers	1–14 (17) – 0–11 (11)	Clan na Gael	Stabannon

16 September 2024	Kilkerley Emmets	1–09 (12) – 2-09 (15)	Dundalk Gaels	Clan na Gael Park

=== Semi-finals ===
28 September 2024	Mattock Rangers	0–13 (13) – 1–11 (14) (a.e.t.)	Dundalk Gaels	McGeough Park

29 September 2024	Hunterstown Rovers	0–10 (10) – 0–08 (8)	Seán O'Mahony's	Stabannon

=== Final ===
13 October 2024	Hunterstown Rovers	1–07 (10) – 2–04 (10)	Dundalk Gaels	Páirc Mhuire
				Referee: Damien Connor (St Patrick's)

=== Final replay ===
19 October 2024	Hunterstown Rovers	0–13 (13) – 2–09 (15)	Dundalk Gaels	Darver
				Referee: Stephen Johnson (Glen Emmets)
