= 2023 Louth Senior Football Championship =

Gaelic football tournament

Tournament details
- County: Louth
- Year: 2023
- Trophy: Joe Ward Cup
- Sponsor: Anchor Tours
- Date: 27 August – 22 October 2023
- Teams: 12
- Defending champions: St Mary's

Winners
- Champions: St Mary's
- Manager: Cathal Murray
- Captain: Kian Moran
- Qualify for: Leinster Club SFC

Runners-up
- Runners-up: Naomh Máirtin

The 2023 Louth Senior Football Championship was the 130th edition of the premier Gaelic football tournament for Senior graded clubs in County Louth, Ireland, organized by Louth GAA. The tournament consisted of 12 teams, with the winner going on to represent the county in the Leinster Senior Club Football Championship. The championship began with a group stage and progressed to a knockout stage after the four teams that finished bottom of their group were eliminated.

St Mary's entered the tournament as defending champions after defeating Newtown Blues in the 2022 decider.

The Ardee club retained the Joe Ward Cup, beating Naomh Máirtin by one point in the final at Dowdallshill.

== Team changes ==
Cooley Kickhams were promoted to Senior football for 2023 as winners of the 2022 Louth Intermediate Championship. They replaced Mattock Rangers, who lost the 2022 Senior Championship Relegation play-off to Dundalk Gaels.

== Group stage ==
=== Group 1 ===
Team	Pld	W	L	D	PF	PA	PD	Pts
Naomh Máirtin	2	1	0	1	35	22	+13	3
St Mochta's	2	1	0	1	34	27	+7	3
Dundalk Gaels	2	0	2	0	23	43	-20	0

Round 1

27 August 2023	Naomh Máirtin	3–13 (22) – (9) 2–03	Dundalk Gaels	Clan na Gael Park

Round 2

4 September 2023	Naomh Máirtin	2–07 (13) – (13) 0–13	St Mochta's	Darver

Round 3

10 September 2023	Dundalk Gaels	2–08 (14) – (21) 2–15	St Mochta's	Páirc Mhuire

=== Group 2 ===
Team	Pld	W	L	D	PF	PA	PD	Pts
Dreadnots	2	2	0	0	28	23	+5	4
Geraldines	2	1	1	0	28	27	+1	2
St Fechin's	2	0	2	0	20	26	-6	0

Round 1

28 August 2023	Geraldines	2–08 (14) – (16) 2–10	Dreadnots	Darver

Round 2

3 September 2023	Dreadnots	0–12 (12) – (9) 0–09	St Fechin's	Darver

Round 3

10 September 2023	Geraldines	0–14 (14) – (11) 1–08	St Fechin's	Darver

=== Group 3 ===
Team	Pld	W	L	D	PF	PA	PD	Pts
St Patrick's	2	2	0	0	26	20	+6	4
St Joseph's	2	0	1	1	22	23	-1	1
Newtown Blues	2	0	1	1	26	31	-5	1

Round 1

27 August 2023	Newtown Blues	1–11 (14) – (14) 0–14	St Joseph's	St Brigid's Park

Round 2

3 September 2023	Newtown Blues	0–12 (12) – (17) 1–14	St Patrick's	Clan na Gael Park

Round 3

10 September 2023	St Joseph's	0–08 (8) – (9) 1–06	St Patrick's	St Brigid's Park

=== Group 4 ===
Team	Pld	W	L	D	PF	PA	PD	Pts
St Mary's	2	2	0	0	35	18	+17	4
Cooley Kickhams	1	0	1	0	24	28	-4	1
St Bride's	1	0	1	0	22	35	-13	1

Round 1

27 August 2023	St Mary's	2–15 (21) – (8) 0–08	St Bride's	Darver

Round 2

3 September 2023	St Mary's	2–08 (14) – (10) 0–10	Cooley Kickhams	St Brigid's Park

Round 3

11 September 2023	St Bride's	1–11 (14) – (14) 1–11	Cooley Kickhams	Clan na Gael Park

=== Relegation Play-Off Semi-finals ===
29 September 2023	Newtown Blues	4–15 (27) – (10) 0–10	Dundalk Gaels	Darver

1 October 2023	St Fechin's	0–14 (14) – (15) 1–12	St Bride's	Darver

=== Relegation Play-Off Final ===
10 October 2023	Dundalk Gaels	0–12 (12) – (33) 6–15	St Fechin's	Darver

- Dundalk Gaels are relegated to Intermediate football for 2024.

== Knockout stage ==
=== Quarter-finals ===
22 September 2023	Dreadnots	0–09 (9) – (8) 0–08	Cooley Kickhams	Clan na Gael Park

23 September 2023	St Mary's	3–12 (21) – (8) 0–08	St Joseph's	Darver

24 September 2023	St Patrick's	1–13 (16) – (11) 1–08	St Mochta's	St Brigid's Park

25 September 2023	Naomh Máirtin	2–07 (13) – (6) 0–06	Geraldines	Stabannon

=== Semi-finals ===
6 October 2023	Dreadnots	3–09 (18) – (19) 1–16	Naomh Máirtin	Darver

8 October 2023	St Patrick's	3–10 (19) – (26) 4–14	St Mary's	St Brigid's Park

=== Final ===
22 October 2023	St Mary's	0–15 (15) – (14) 1–11	Naomh Máirtin	St Brigid's Park
				Referee: Colm McCullough (Naomh Fionnbarra)
