= 2020 Louth Senior Football Championship =

Gaelic football tournament

Tournament details
- County: Louth
- Year: 2020
- Trophy: Joe Ward Cup
- Sponsor: Anchor Tours
- Date: August – September 2020
- Teams: 12
- Defending champions: Newtown Blues

Winners
- Champions: Naomh Máirtín (1st win)
- Manager: Fergal Reel
- Captain: Mick Fanning
- Qualify for: Leinster Club SFC

Runners-up
- Runners-up: St Mary's
- Manager: Seán Barry
- Captain: Darren Clarke

The 2020 Louth Senior Football Championship was the 127th edition of the Louth GAA's premier club Gaelic football tournament for senior graded teams in County Louth, Ireland. The tournament consisted of 12 teams, with the winner going on to represent Louth in the Leinster Senior Club Football Championship. The championship started with a group stage and then progressed to a knock out stage.

Newtown Blues were the defending champions for the third year in a row after defeating Naomh Máirtín in the previous years final.

This was the return of Mattock Rangers to the senior grade after at 4 year absence (they were relegated from the S.F.C. to the I.F.C. back in 2015) when claiming the 2019 Louth Intermediate Football Championship title with a final victory over Kilkerley Emmets.

== Team changes ==
The following teams changed division since the 2019 championship season.

=== To S.F.C. ===
Promoted from 2019 Louth I.F.C.

- Mattock Rangers - (Intermediate Champions)

=== From S.F.C. ===
Relegated to 2020 Louth I.F.C.

- Seán O'Mahony's

== Group stage ==
There were 4 groups called Group A, B, C and D. The top two finishers in each group qualified for the quarter-finals. The bottom finishers of each group Qualified for the Relegation Play-off.

=== Group A ===
Team	Pld	W	L	D	PF	PA	PD	Pts
St Patrick's	2	1	0	1	33	26	+7	3
Geraldines	2	0	0	2	30	30	+0	2
O'Raghallaighs	2	0	1	1	30	37	-7	1

Round 1:

- St Patrick's 1-10, 1-10 Geraldines, Dowdallshill, 16/8/2020,

Round 2:

- Geraldines 2-11, 2-11 O'Raghallaighs, Darver, 25/8/2020,

Round 3:

- St Patrick's 2-14, 1-10 O'Raghallaighs, Darver, 30/8/2020,

=== Group B ===
Team	Pld	W	L	D	PF	PA	PD	Pts
Naomh Máirtín	2	2	0	0	37	21	+16	4
St Mochta's	2	0	1	1	30	32	-2	1
Dreadnots	2	0	1	1	23	37	-14	1

Round 1:

- Dreadnots 0-16, 1-13 St Mochta's, Dunleer, 16/8/2020,

Round 2:

- Naomh Martin 2-15, 0-07 Dreadnots, Darver, 23/8/2020,

Round 3:

- Naomh Martin 1-13, 1-11 St Mochta's, Darver, 30/8/2020,

=== Group C ===
Team	Pld	W	L	D	PF	PA	PD	Pts
St Joseph's	2	2	0	0	28	22	+6	4
Dundalk Gaels	2	1	0	1	29	24	+5	2
O'Connell's	2	0	0	2	19	30	-11	0

Round 1:

- Dundalk Gaels 0-17, 0-09 O'Connell's, Ardee, 16/8/2020,

Round 2:

- St Joseph's 2-09, 2-06 Dundalk Gaels, Darver, 23/8/2020,

Round 3:

- St Joseph's 0-13, 0-10 O'Connell's, Darver, 30/8/2020,

=== Group D ===
Team	Pld	W	L	D	PF	PA	PD	Pts
St Mary's	2	2	0	0	42	34	+8	4
Newtown Blues	2	1	0	1	32	31	+1	2
Mattock Rangers	2	0	0	2	36	45	-9	0

Round 1:

- Newtown Blues 2-12, 2-10 Mattock Rangers, Drogheda Park, 16/8/2020,

Round 2:

- St Mary's 1-12, 0-14 Newtown Blues, Darver, 23/8/2020,

Round 3:

- St Mary's 4-15, 0-20 Mattock Rangers, Darver, 30/8/2020,

== Knock-out stages ==
=== Relegation play-off ===
The four bottom finishers from each group qualified for the relegation play-off. The team to lose both matches were relegated to the 2021 I.F.C.

?? September 2020; Relegation semi-final	???	-vs-	???	???

?? September 2020; Relegation semi-final	???	-vs-	???	???

?? September 2020; Relegation final	???	-vs-	???	???

== Quarter-finals ==
The winners and runners up of each group qualified for the quarter-finals.

6 September 2020; 13:00; Quarter-final	St Joseph's	-vs-	Newtown Blues	Darver

6 September 2020; 15:00; Quarter-final	St Mary's	4-15 - 3-11	Geraldines	Darver

6 September 2020; 17:00; Quarter-final	St Patrick's	1-11 - 1-15	St Mochta's	Darver

6 September 2020; 19:00; Quarter-Final	Naomh Máirtín	4-12 - 0-06	Dundalk Gaels	Darver

== Semi-finals ==
20 September 2020; Semi-final	Naomh Martin	4-16 - 2-11	St Mochta's	Dunleer

20 September 2020; Semi-final	Newtown Blues	0-13 - 1-13	St Mary's	Darver

== Final ==
27 September 2020; Final	Naomh Martin	1-13 - 1-9	St Mary's	Darver
