= Dessie Finnegan =

Irish Gaelic footballer

Personal information
- Native name: Deasún Ó Fionnagáin (Irish)
- Born: Drogheda, Ireland
- Occupation: Plumber
- Height: 1.83 m (6 ft 0 in)

Sport
- Sport: Gaelic football
- Position: Full Back
Club
- Years: Club
- St Patrick's
Club titles
- Louth titles: 7
Inter-county
- Years: County
- 2006-2015: Louth
Inter-county titles
- NFL: 2

Dessie Finnegan (born 1984) is an Irish former Gaelic footballer who played for his local club St Patrick's of Lordship and the Louth county team.

He manned the full-back berth on the Louth team that contested the 2010 Leinster Senior Football Championship Final. His older brother Ray Finnegan played alongside him in defence as Louth were beaten in controversial circumstances.

== Honours ==
County

- National Football League Division 2 (1): 2006
- Tommy Murphy Cup (1): 2006
- National Football League Division 3 (1): 2011
- O'Byrne Cup (1): 2009
- Owen Treacy Cup (1): 2006

Club

- Louth Senior Football Championship (7): 2003, 2004, 2007, 2011, 2012, 2014, 2015
- Cardinal O'Donnell Cup (6): 1999, 2003, 2009, 2012, 2013, 2014
- Paddy Sheelan Cup (1): 2011
- Louth Under-21 Football Championship (1): 2001
- Louth Minor Football Championship (1): 2002
- Louth Minor Football League (2): 2001 2002,
