= 2017 Louth Senior Football Championship =

Louth S.F.C.
- Season: 2017
- Champions: Newtown Blues (21st title)
- Relegated: Cooley Kickhams
- All Ireland SCFC: n/a
- Winning Captain: Andy McDonnell
- Winning Manager: Ronan Phillips
- Man of the Match: Ross Nally
- Leinster SCFC: ???
- Matches: 24

The 2017 Louth Senior Football Championship was the 124th edition of the Louth GAA's premier club Gaelic football tournament for senior graded teams in County Louth, Ireland. The tournament consisted of 12 teams, with the winner going on to represent Louth in the Leinster Senior Club Football Championship. The championship started with a group stage and then progressed to a knock out stage.

Seán O'Mahony's were the defending champions after defeating St Mary's in the previous years final.

This was the return of St Joseph's to the senior grade after claiming the 2016 Louth Intermediate Football Championship title. This ended their 8-year absence from the senior grade after they were relegated to the I.F.C. in 2008.

The draw for the group stages of the championship were made on 9 March 2018.

== Team changes ==
The following teams changed division since the 2016 championship season.

=== To S.F.C. ===
Promoted from 2016 Louth Intermediate Football Championship

- St Joseph's – (Intermediate Champions)

=== From S.F.C. ===
Relegated to 2017 Louth Intermediate Football Championship

- O'Connell's

== Group stage ==
There were 4 groups called Group A, B, C and D. The top two finishers in each group qualified for the quarter-finals. The bottom finishers of each group qualified for the Relegation Play Off. The draw for the group stages of the championship were made on 9 March 2017.

=== Group A ===
Team	Pld	W	L	D	PF	PA	PD	Pts
Seán O'Mahony's	2	2	0	0	20	18	+2	4
St Joseph's	2	0	1	1	24	25	-1	1
St Mary's	2	0	1	1	24	25	-1	1

Round 1

- St Mary's 0-15, 0-15 St Joseph's, Castlebellingham, 8/7/2017,

Round 2

- Seán O'Mahony's 1-7, 0-9 St Mary's, Dunleer, 15/7/2017,

Round 3

- Seán O'Mahony's 1-7, 0-9 St Joseph's, Knockbridge, 22/7/2017,

Quarter-final play-off

- St Joseph's 0-17, 0-14 St Mary's, Dunleer, 12/8/2017,

=== Group B ===
Team	Pld	W	L	D	PF	PA	PD	Pts
Newtown Blues	2	2	0	0	37	29	+8	4
Dreadnots	2	1	1	0	36	24	+12	2
Kilkerley Emmets	2	0	2	0	29	49	-20	0

Round 1

- Newtown Blues 4-11, 3-10 Kilkerley Emmets, Castlebellingham, 8/7/2017,

Round 2

- Newtown Blues 0-14, 0-10 Dreadnots, Drogheda Park, 14/7/2017,

Round 3

- Dreadnots 2-20, 0-10 Kilkerley Emmets, Stabannon, 22/7/2017,

=== Group C ===
Team	Pld	W	L	D	PF	PA	PD	Pts
Naomh Máirtín	2	2	0	0	48	36	+12	4
Dundalk Gaels	2	1	1	0	31	36	-5	2
Cooley Kickhams	2	0	2	0	24	31	-7	0

Round 1

- Dundalk Gaels 0-10, 1-6 Cooley Kickhams, Dowdallshill, 9/7/2017,

Round 2

- Naomh Máirtín 4-15, 2-15 Dundalk Gaels, Castlebellingham, 15/7/2017,

Round 3

- Naomh Máirtín 2-15, 1-12 Cooley Kickhams, Castlebellingham, 23/7/2017,

=== Group D ===
Team	Pld	W	L	D	PF	PA	PD	Pts
Geraldines	2	2	0	0	40	27	+13	4
St Patrick's	2	1	1	0	34	30	+4	2
O'Raghallaighs	2	0	2	0	26	43	-17	0

Round 1

- Geraldines 1-14, 0-14 St Patrick's, Dowdallshill, 9/7/2017,

Round 2

- Geraldines 0-23, 1-10 O'Raghallaighs, Castlebellingham, 15/7/2017,

Round 3

- St Patrick's 2-14, 2-7 O'Raghallaighs, Castlebellingham, 23/7/2017,

== Knock-out stage ==
=== Relegation play-off ===
The four bottom finishers from each group qualified for the relegation play off. The team to lose both matches was to be relegated to the 2018 Intermediate Championship.

19 August 2017; Relegation semi-final	O'Raghallaighs	4-11 -3-13	Kilkerley Emmets
19 August 2017; Relegation semi-final		Report

20 August 2017; Relegation semi-final	St Mary's	1-12 – 0-10	Cooley Kickhams
20 August 2017; Relegation semi-final		Report

10 September 2017; 11:30 am Relegation final	Kilkerley Emmets	2-15 – 0-15	Cooley Kickhams	Dowdallshill
10 September 2017; 11:30 am Relegation final		Report		Dowdallshill

=== Finals ===
The winners and runners up of each group qualify for the quarter finals.

Quarter-finals		Semi-Finals		Final
Newtown Blues	1-10
St Patrick's	2-6	Newtown Blues	1-11
Geraldines	0-11	St Joseph's	0-8
St Joseph's	0-11			Newtown Blues	2-10
Naomh Máirtín	2-15			Dundalk Gaels	0-05
Dreadnots	2-15	Naomh Máirtín	1-11
Seán O'Mahony's	1-6	Dundalk Gaels	0-15
Dundalk Gaels	0-9

== Quarter-finals ==
19 August 2017; 17:30; Quarter-final	Naomh Máirtín	2-15 – 2-15	Dreadnots	Dunleer; Referee: David Fedigan (Hunterstown Rovers)
19 August 2017; 17:30; Quarter-final	Sam Mulroy 0-4 (0-3f), Padraig McDonagh and Brian Berrill 1-0 each, Stephen Campbell 0-3, Eoghan Callaghan and Conor Whelan (0-1f) 0-2 each, Bryan McQuillan, John Clutterbuck, Wayne Campbell, Francis McCullough 0-1 each	Report	Paraic Smith 0-5 (0-3f), Peter Kirwan 1-1, Derek Shevlin 1-0, James Califf 0-3f, Pat Lynch and Liam Shevlin 0-2 each, David O'Brien and Carl Monaghan 0-1 each	Dunleer; Referee: David Fedigan (Hunterstown Rovers)

19 August 2017; 19:00; Quarter-final	Newtown Blues	1-10 – 2-6	St Patrick's	Dunleer; Referee: Jonathan Conlon (O'Connells)
19 August 2017; 19:00; Quarter-final	Ross Nally 0-4 (0-3f), John Kermode 1-0, Andy McDonnell and Colm Judge (0-1f) 0-2 each, Robert Carr and Hugh McGinn 0-1 each	Report	Eoin O'Connor and Daniel O'Connor 1-1 each, Paddy Keenan 0-3 (0-2f), Evan White 0-1	Dunleer; Referee: Jonathan Conlon (O'Connells)

20 August 2017; 17:30; Quarter-final	Seán O'Mahony's	1-6 – 0-9	Dundalk Gaels	Knockbridge; Referee: Stephen Johnson (Glen Emmets)
20 August 2017; 17:30; Quarter-final	Stephen Kilcoyne 1-2 (0-1f), Conor Finnegan 0-2f, Ben McLoughlin, Conor Martin and Stephen Fisher 0-1 each	Report	David Maloney, Sean Murray, Eanna McArdle (0-1f), Ger McSorley (0-1f) 0-2 each, Sean McCann 0-1	Knockbridge; Referee: Stephen Johnson (Glen Emmets)

20 August 2017; 19:00; Quarter-final	Geraldines	0-11 – 0-11	St Joseph's	Knockbridge; Referee: Stephen Murphy (Naomh Máirtín)
20 August 2017; 19:00; Quarter-final	Jim McEneaney 0-6 (0-2f), Dara Hamill 0-2, Stephen Reidy, Josh Arrowsmith, Glen Trainor 0-1 each	Report	Alan Quigley 0-5 (0-4f), Derek Mulligan 0-3, Conal O'Hanlon 0-2 (0-1f), Daire Smyth 0-1	Knockbridge; Referee: Stephen Murphy (Naomh Máirtín)

9 September 2017; 17:30; Quarter-final replay	St Joseph's	3-10 – 1-11	Geraldines	Castlebellingham; Referee: David J. McArdle
9 September 2017; 17:30; Quarter-final replay		Report		Castlebellingham; Referee: David J. McArdle

10 September 2017; 15:30; Quarter-final replay	Naomh Máirtín	3-14 – 1-12	Dreadnots	Drogheda Park; Referee: Paul Kneel

10 September 2017; 19:00; Quarter-final replay	Dundalk Gaels	0-12 – 0-11	Seán O'Mahony's	Haggardstown; Referee: Noel Hand
10 September 2017; 19:00; Quarter-final replay		Report		Haggardstown; Referee: Noel Hand

== Semi-finals ==
23 September 2017; 17:30; Semi-final	Newtown Blues	1-11 – 0-8	St Joseph's	Castlebellingham; Referee: Paul Kneel (Kilkerley Emmets)
23 September 2017; 17:30; Semi-final		Report		Castlebellingham; Referee: Paul Kneel (Kilkerley Emmets)

1 October 2017; 15:00; Semi-final	Dundalk Gaels	0-15 – 1-11	Naomh Máirtín	Castlebellingham; Referee: Anthony Briscoe (Stabannon Parnells)
1 October 2017; 15:00; Semi-final		Report		Castlebellingham; Referee: Anthony Briscoe (Stabannon Parnells)

== Final ==
15 October 2017; 3:30 pm Final	Newtown Blues	2-10 – 0-5	Dundalk Gaels	Drogheda Park, Louth; Referee: David Fedigan (Hunterstown Rovers); Man of the Match: Ross Nally
15 October 2017; 3:30 pm Final	Ross Nally 1-5 (0-4f), Ciaran Downey 0-3, Conor Moore 1-0, Kevin Carr and Robert Carr 0-1 each	Report	Éanna McArdle 0-2f, Derek Crilly (0-1f), David Moloney, Barry Watters 0-1 each	Drogheda Park, Louth; Referee: David Fedigan (Hunterstown Rovers); Man of the Match: Ross Nally
