= 2025 Louth Senior Football Championship =

Gaelic football tournament

Tournament details
- County: Louth
- Year: 2025
- Trophy: Joe Ward Cup
- Sponsor: Anchor Tours
- Date: 30 August 2025 - 26 October 2025
- Teams: 12
- Defending champions: St Mary's

Winners
- Champions: Naomh Máirtín
- Manager: Mattie Rice
- Captain: Eoghan Callaghan
- Qualify for: Leinster Club SFC

Runners-up
- Runners-up: Newtown Blues

The 2025 Louth Senior Football Championship was the 132nd edition of the premier Gaelic football tournament for Senior graded clubs in County Louth, Ireland, organized by Louth GAA. The tournament consisted of 12 teams, with the winner going on to represent the county in the Leinster Senior Club Football Championship. The championship began with a group stage and progressed to a knockout stage after the elimination of the four teams that finished bottom of their group.

The draw for the tournament took place at Aiken Barracks in Dundalk on 19 March 2025. St Mary's of Ardee were seeking a fourth consecutive county title, but lost to Newtown Blues at the semi-final stage. Naomh Máirtín defeated the Blues in the final by seven points, to claim their third ever Joe Ward Cup.

== Team changes ==
Dundalk Gaels were promoted to Senior football for 2025 as winners of the 2024 Louth Intermediate Football Championship. They replaced St Bride's, who lost the 2024 Senior Championship Relegation play-off to St Fechin's.

== Group stage ==
=== Group 1 ===
Team	Pld	W	L	D	PF	PA	PD	Pts
Dundalk Gaels	2	1	1	0	38	29	9	2
Cooley Kickhams	2	1	1	0	39	39	0	2
Roche Emmets	2	1	1	0	29	38	-9	2

Round 1

30 August 2025	Dundalk Gaels	2–13 (19) – 0–09 (9)	Roche Emmets	Fr. McEvoy Park

Round 2

7 September 2025	Cooley Kickhams	0–20 (20) – 2–13 (19)	Dundalk Gaels	St Brigid's Park

Round 3

15 September 2025	Cooley Kickhams	1–16 (19) – 2–14 (20)	Roche Emmets	Darver

=== Group 2 ===
Team	Pld	W	L	D	PF	PA	PD	Pts
Dreadnots	2	1	1	0	32	31	1	2
St Patrick's	2	1	1	0	31	31	0	2
St Mochta's	2	1	1	0	31	32	-1	2

Round 1

31 August 2025	St Mochta's	0–15 (15) – 1–14 (17)	Dreadnots	Darver

Round 2

8 September 2025	St Patrick's	1–13 (16) – 1–12 (15)	Dreadnots	Darver

Round 3

14 September 2025	St Patrick's	0–15 (15) – 0–16 (16)	St Mochta's	Darver

=== Group 3 ===
Team	Pld	W	L	D	PF	PA	PD	Pts
St Mary's	2	2	0	0	41	24	17	4
St Fechin's	2	1	1	0	24	27	-3	2
Geraldines	2	0	2	0	26	40	-14	0

Round 1

31 August 2025	Geraldines	2–06 (12) – 0–14 (14)	St Fechin's	The Grove

Round 2

6 September 2025	St Mary's	0–15 (15) – 0–10 (10)	St Fechin's	Darver

Round 3

18 September 2025	St Mary's	2–20 (26) – 0–14 (14)	Geraldines	Darver

=== Group 4 ===
Team	Pld	W	L	D	PF	PA	PD	Pts
Naomh Máirtín	2	2	0	0	43	39	4	4
Newtown Blues	2	1	1	0	48	35	13	2
St Joseph's	2	0	2	0	25	42	-17	0

Round 1

1 September 2025	Naomh Máirtín	0–18 (18) – 0–15 (15)	St Joseph's	Stabannon

Round 2

7 September 2025	Newtown Blues	1–21 (24) – 4–13 (25)	Naomh Máirtín	Integral GAA Grounds

Round 3

14 September 2025	Newtown Blues	2–18 (24) – 1–07 (10)	St Joseph's	The Grove

=== Relegation Play-Off Semi-finals ===
26 September 2025	St Joseph's	0–14 (14) – 3–11 (20)	St Mochta's	Darver

28 September 2025	Roche Emmets	2–17 (23) – 0–13 (13)	Geraldines	Darver

=== Relegation Play-Off Final ===
10 October 2025	Geraldines	2–09 (15) – 1–16 (19)	St Joseph's	Darver

- Geraldines are relegated to Intermediate football for 2026.

== Knockout stage ==
=== Quarter-finals ===
27 September 2025	Dreadnots	2–16 (22) – 0–09 (9)	Cooley Kickhams	McGeough Park

28 September 2025	Naomh Máirtín	1–16 (19) – 1–16 (19)	St Patrick's	Darver

4 October 2025 Replay	St Patrick's	0–12 (12) – 1–16 (19)	Naomh Máirtín	Darver

28 September 2025	St Mary's	1–14 (17) – 2–17 (23)	Newtown Blues	Integral GAA Grounds

29 September 2025	Dundalk Gaels	0–12 (12) – 1–09 (12)	St Fechin's	Darver

5 October 2025 Replay	St Fechin's	2–13 (19) – 1–17 (20) (a.e.t.)	Dundalk Gaels	Darver

=== Semi-finals ===
12 October 2025	Newtown Blues	0–18 (18) – 0–16 (16)	Dreadnots	Darver

13 October 2025	Dundalk Gaels	0–07 (7) – 0–16 (16)	Naomh Máirtín	Darver

=== Final ===
26 October 2025	Naomh Máirtín	1–18 (21) – 1–11 (14)	Newtown Blues	Integral GAA Grounds
