= 2018 Louth Senior Football Championship =

Gaelic football tournament

Tournament details
- County: Louth
- Year: 2018
- Trophy: Joe Ward Cup
- Sponsor: Anchor Tours
- Date: July – October 2018
- Teams: 12
- Defending champions: Newtown Blues

Winners
- Champions: Newtown Blues (22nd win)
- Manager: Ronan Phillips
- Captain: Andy McDonnell
- Qualify for: Leinster Club SFC

Runners-up
- Runners-up: Naomh Máirtín
- Manager: Jim Farrell
- Captain: Michael Fanning

Promotion/Relegation
- Relegated team(s): Kilkerley Emmets

Other
- Matches played: 24

The 2018 Louth Senior Football Championship was the 125th edition of the Louth GAA's premier club Gaelic football tournament for senior graded teams in County Louth, Ireland. The tournament consisted of 12 teams, with the winner going on to represent Louth in the Leinster Senior Club Football Championship. The championship started with a group stage and then progressed to a knock out stage. The draw for the group stages was made on 8 March 2018.

Newtown Blues were the defending champions after defeating Dundalk Gaels in the previous year's final. This was the return of O'Connell's to the senior grade after claiming the 2017 Louth Intermediate Football Championship title, making a straight bounce back to the top flight after they were relegated to the I.F.C. in 2016.

== Team changes ==
The following teams changed division since the 2017 championship season.

=== To S.F.C. ===
Promoted from 2017 Louth Intermediate Football Championship

- O'Connell's - (Intermediate Champions)

=== From S.F.C. ===
Relegated to 2018 Louth Intermediate Football Championship

- Cooley Kickhams

== Group stage ==
The top two finishers in each group (A, B, C, and D) qualified for the quarter-finals. The bottom finishers of each group qualified for the Relegation Play-off. The draw for the group stages of the championship was made on 8 March 2018.

=== Group A ===
| Team | Pld | W | L | D | PF | PA | PD | Pts |
|---|---|---|---|---|---|---|---|---|
| Dreadnots | 2 | 2 | 0 | 0 | 35 | 27 | +8 | 4 |
| Seán O'Mahony's | 2 | 1 | 1 | 0 | 33 | 36 | -3 | 2 |
| St Mary's | 2 | 0 | 2 | 0 | 39 | 44 | -5 | 0 |

Round 1

- Dreadnots 1-17, 2-12 St Mary's, Dunleer, 8/7/2018,

Round 2

- Dreadnots 2-9, 0-9 Seán O'Mahony's, Castlebellingham, 15/7/2018,

Round 3

- Seán O'Mahony's 3-15, 3-12 St Mary's, Ecco Road, 21/7/2018,

=== Group B ===
| Team | Pld | W | L | D | PF | PA | PD | Pts |
|---|---|---|---|---|---|---|---|---|
| Newtown Blues | 2 | 2 | 0 | 0 | 39 | 22 | +17 | 4 |
| Naomh Máirtín | 2 | 1 | 1 | 0 | 30 | 31 | -1 | 2 |
| Kilkerley Emmets | 2 | 0 | 2 | 0 | 24 | 40 | -16 | 0 |

Round 1

- Newtown Blues 1-16, 1-7 Naomh Máirtín, Dunleer, 8/7/2018,

Round 2

- Newtown Blues 1-17, 1-9 Kilkerley Emmets, Castlebellingham, 15/7/2018,

Round 3

- Naomh Máirtín 3-11, 1-9 Kilkerley Emmets, Dunleer, 22/7/2018,

=== Group C ===
| Team | Pld | W | L | D | PF | PA | PD | Pts |
|---|---|---|---|---|---|---|---|---|
| St Patrick's | 2 | 1 | 1 | 0 | 25 | 22 | +2 | 2 |
| Dundalk Gaels | 2 | 1 | 1 | 0 | 27 | 28 | -1 | 2 |
| Geraldines | 2 | 1 | 1 | 0 | 22 | 24 | -2 | 2 |

Round 1

- Geraldines 0-10, 0-9 St Patrick's, Dowdallshill, 8/7/2018,

Round 2

- Dundalk Gaels 1-12, 0-12 Geraldines, Ecco Road, 15/7/2018,

Round 3

- St Patrick's 1-13, 0-12 Dundalk Gaels, Ecco Road, 21/7/2018,

=== Group D ===
| Team | Pld | W | L | D | PF | PA | PD | Pts |
|---|---|---|---|---|---|---|---|---|
| O'Connell's | 2 | 1 | 1 | 0 | 40 | 36 | +4 | 2 |
| St Joseph's | 2 | 1 | 1 | 0 | 29 | 28 | +1 | 2 |
| O'Raghallaighs | 2 | 1 | 1 | 0 | 35 | 40 | -5 | 2 |

Round 1

- O'Raghallaighs 1-12, 0-13 St Joseph's, Castlebellingham, 7/7/2018,

Round 2

- O'Connell's 3-18, 3-11 O'Raghallaighs, Dunleer, 14/7/2018,

Round 3

- St Joseph's 0-16, 1-10 O'Connell's, Dunleer, 22/7/2018,

== Knock-out Stages ==
=== Relegation play-off ===
The four bottom finishers from each group qualified for the relegation play off. The team to lose both matches was relegated to the 2018 Intermediate Championship.

| 26 August 2018; 11:30am Relegation semi-final | O'Raghallaighs | 1-21 - 1-20 (a.e.t.) | Kilkerley Emmets | Castlebellingham; Referee: David Fedigan |

| 26 August 2018; 1:00pm Relegation semi-final | St Mary's | 0-20 - 1-7 | Geraldines | Castlebellingham; Referee: Stephen Murphy |

| 14 September 2018; Relegation final | Geraldines | 3-7 0-6 | Kilkerley Emmets | Darver |

=== Finals ===
The winners and runners up of each group qualified for the quarter-finals.

| Quarter-finals | | Semi-finals | | Final |
| Newtown Blues | 1-18 |
| St Joseph's | 0-9 | Newtown Blues | 0-14 |
| Dreadnots | 5-9 | Drednots | 0-7 |
| Dundalk Gaels | 0-9 | | | Newtown Blues | 1-11 |
| Naomh Máirtín | 5-16 | | | Naomh Máirtín | 1-10 |
| O'Connell's | 1-9 | Naomh Máirtín | 3-13 |
| St Patrick's | 0-12 | St Patrick's | 1-8 |
| Seán O'Mahony's | 1-8 |

== Quarter-finals ==
| 15 September 2018; 4:45pm | Naomh Máirtín | 5-16 - 1-9 | O'Connell's | Dunleer |

| 15 September 2018; 6:15pm | Newtown Blues | 1-18 - 0-9 | St Joseph's | Dunleer |

| 16 September 2018; 4:30pm | Dreadnots | 5-9 - 0-11 | Dundalk Gaels | Castlebellingham |

| 16 September 2018; 7:00pm | St Patrick's | 0-12 - 1-8 | Seán O'Mahony's | Ecco Road |

== Semi-finals ==
| 30 September 2018 | Newtown Blues | 0-14 - 0-7 | Dreadnots | Gaelic Grounds |

| 29 September 2018 | Naomh Máirtín | 3-13 - 1-8 | St Patrick's | St Mary's |

== Final ==
| 21 October 2018 | Newtown Blues | 1-11 - 1-10 | Naomh Máirtín | Drogheda Park, Louth |
| 21 October 2018 | | Report | | Drogheda Park, Louth |
