= 2024 Louth Senior Football Championship =

Gaelic football tournament

Tournament details
- County: Louth
- Year: 2024
- Trophy: Joe Ward Cup
- Sponsor: Anchor Tours
- Date: 25 August - 20 October 2024
- Teams: 12
- Defending champions: St Mary's

Winners
- Champions: St Mary's
- Manager: Cathal Murray
- Captain: Liam Jackson/Robbie Leavy
- Qualify for: Leinster Club SFC

Runners-up
- Runners-up: Naomh Máirtín

The 2024 Louth Senior Football Championship was the 131st edition of the premier Gaelic football tournament for Senior graded clubs in County Louth, Ireland, organized by Louth GAA. The tournament consisted of 12 teams, with the winner going on to represent the county in the Leinster Senior Club Football Championship. The championship began with a group stage and progressed to a knockout stage after the elimination of the four teams that finished bottom of their group.

The draw for the tournament took place at Louth GAA headquarters in Darver on 29 February 2024.

St Mary's retained their title, their third in a row, after defeating Naomh Máirtín in the decider for a second consecutive year.

== Team changes ==
Roche Emmets were promoted to Senior football for 2024 as winners of the 2023 Louth Intermediate Championship. They replaced Dundalk Gaels, who lost the 2023 Senior Championship Relegation play-off to St Fechin's.

== Group stage ==
=== Group 1 ===
Team	Pld	W	L	D	PF	PA	PD	Pts
St Patrick's	2	1	0	1	26	19	+7	3
Dreadnots	2	1	0	1	17	14	+3	3
St Bride's	2	0	2	0	17	27	-10	0

Round 1

25 August 2024	St Bride's	0–06 (6) – 0–09 (9)	Dreadnots	The Grove

Round 2

1 September 2024	St Patrick's	1–05 (8) – 1–05 (8)	Dreadnots	Clan na Gael Park

Round 3

8 September 2024	St Patrick's	1–15 (18) – 1–08 (11)	St Bride's	Clan na Gael Park

=== Group 2 ===
Team	Pld	W	L	D	PF	PA	PD	Pts
St Mochta's	2	2	0	0	31	18	+13	4
Naomh Máirtín	2	1	1	0	28	17	+11	2
Cooley Kickhams	2	0	2	0	13	37	-24	0

Round 1

25 August 2024	Naomh Máirtín	2–12 (18) – 0–05 (5)	Cooley Kickhams	St Brigid's Park

Round 2

2 September 2024	St Mochta's	1–09 (12) – 0–10 (10)	Naomh Máirtín	Stabannon

Round 3

8 September 2024	St Mochta's	1–16 (19) – 1–05 (8)	Cooley Kickhams	St Brigid's Park

=== Group 3 ===
Team	Pld	W	L	D	PF	PA	PD	Pts
Newtown Blues	2	2	0	0	39	31	+8	4
St Mary's	2	1	1	0	29	28	+1	2
Geraldines	2	0	2	0	27	36	-9	0

Round 1

26 August 2024	Geraldines	1–06 (9) – 0–16 (16)	St Mary's	Stabannon

Round 2

1 September 2024	Newtown Blues	2–13 (19) – 0–13 (13)	St Mary's	Páirc Uí Mhuirí

Round 3

8 September 2024	Newtown Blues	2–14 (20) – 2–12 (18)	Geraldines	Páirc Uí Mhuirí

=== Group 4 ===
Team	Pld	W	L	D	PF	PA	PD	Pts
St Joseph's	2	2	0	0	37	16	+21	4
Roche Emmets	2	1	1	0	16	27	-11	2
St Fechin's	2	0	2	0	19	29	-10	0

Round 1

25 August 2024	St Joseph's	2–12 (18) – 1–03 (6)	Roche Emmets	McGeough Park

Round 2

1 September 2024	St Fechin's	0–10 (10) – 2–13 (19)	St Joseph's	The Grove

Round 3

9 September 2024	St Fechin's	0–09 (9) – 0–10 (10)	Roche Emmets	Stabannon

=== Relegation Play-Off Semi-finals ===
20 September 2024	St Bride's	1–12 (15) – 2–16 (22)	Geraldines	Darver

20 September 2024	Cooley Kickhams	3–11 (20) – 0–12 (12)	St Fechin's	Páirc De Róiste

=== Relegation Play-Off Final ===
4 October 2024	St Bride's	0–05 (5) – 1–10 (13)	St Fechin's	Darver

- St Bride's are relegated to Intermediate football for 2025.

== Knockout stage ==
=== Quarter-finals ===
21 September 2024	Newtown Blues	1–10 (13) – 0–12 (12)	Roche Emmets	Darver

22 September 2024	St Joseph's	2–06 (12) – 1–15 (18)	Naomh Máirtín	Darver

22 September 2024	St Patrick's	0–08 (8) – 2–12 (18)	St Mary's	St Brigid's Park

23 September 2024	St Mochta's	0–12 (12) – 1–05 (8) (a.e.t.)	Dreadnots	McGeough Park

=== Semi-finals ===
5 October 2024	Newtown Blues	0–10 (10) – 2–14 (20)	St Mary's	McGeough Park

6 October 2024	Naomh Máirtín	2–08 (14) – 2–07 (13)	St Mochta's	St Brigid's Park
		Report

=== Final ===
20 October 2024	Naomh Máirtín	0–04 (4) – 2–02 (8)	St Mary's	McGeough Park
				Referee: Cathal Sweeney (Stabannon Parnells)
