= Ray Finnegan =

Gaelic footballer

Personal information
- Native name: Réamonn Ó Fionnagáin (Irish)
- Born: Drogheda, Ireland
- Occupation: Electrician
- Height: 1.77 m (5 ft 10 in)

Sport
- Sport: Gaelic football
- Position: Right half-back
Club
- Years: Club
- St Patrick's (Lordship)
Club titles
- Louth titles: 7
Inter-county
- Years: County
- 2004-2013: Louth
Inter-county titles
- NFL: 1

Ray Finnegan (born 1982) is a retired inter-county Gaelic footballer from Louth. He played club football with his local team St Patrick's. He was a member of the Louth senior team from 2004 until his retirement in 2013. His younger brother Dessie was a teammate at both club and county level.

Finnegan was captain of the St Patrick's team that won the club's sixth Louth SFC title in 2014.

== Honours ==
County

- Tommy Murphy Cup (1): 2006
- National Football League Division 3 (1): 2011
- O'Byrne Cup (1): 2009
- Owen Treacy Cup (1): 2006

Club

- Louth Senior Football Championship (7): 2003, 2004, 2007, 2011, 2012, 2014, 2015
- Cardinal O'Donnell Cup (5): 2003, 2009, 2012, 2013, 2014
- Paddy Sheelan Cup (2): 2002, 2011
- Louth Under-21 Football Championship (1): 2001
