= Danny Nugent =

Irish Gaelic football player

Personal information
- Born: 1947 (age 78–79) Drogheda, County Louth

Sport
- Sport: Gaelic football
- Position: half-back
Club
- Years: Club
- 1966-1987: Newtown Blues
Inter-county
- Years: County
- 1967-1977: Louth

Danny Nugent is a retired Irish Gaelic footballer who played as a defender for the Louth senior football team and for his club Newtown Blues. He also played inter-provincial football for Leinster.

== Playing career ==
His inter-county career began with the Louth junior side in 1966 while still a teenager. He was a member of the team that defeated Kildare in the final of the Leinster Junior Football Championship, scoring the decisive goal in a two-point win. Later that year Nugent won his first Louth Senior Football Championship medal when Newtown Blues beat Cooley Kickhams in the county final at St Brigid's Park. He was team captain in the 1970 county decider when the Drogheda side overcame St Mary's by three points.

Nugent lined out at right half-back against Dublin in the quarter-final of the 1973 Leinster Championship, as Louth beat the Metropolitans by 1–08 to 0-09. At the end of the year he received the Louth GAA Player of the Year award and was nominated for an All-Star. Two years later he was captain of the county side that beat Meath by 0–15 to 1–09 in the opening round of the 1975 provincial championship.

== Later years ==
In retirement Nugent filled the role of county team selector, assisting Louth managers Mickey Whelan and Frank Lynch. At club level he was a selector under manager Davy Byrne when Newtown Blues won the Louth SFC title in 1988.

In 1992 a Louth team of retired over-40s footballers reached the final of the All-Ireland Masters Championship. Nugent featured at left corner-back as Mayo won on a scoreline of 3–09 to 0-09.

Since his playing days ended he has held the roles of chairman, secretary, minor team mentor and youth officer for Newtown Blues.

== Personal life ==
His grandfather, Daniel McEvoy won a Senior All Ireland medal with Louth in 1912.

== Honours ==
Newtown Blues

- Louth Senior Football Championship (7): 1966, 1967, 1969, 1970, 1974, 1981, 1986
- Cardinal O'Donnell Cup (5): 1969, 1977, 1981, 1984, 1986
- Old Gaels/ACC Cup (3): 1966, 1970, 1986

Wolfe Tones

- Louth Minor Hurling Championship (1): 1964
- Louth Minor Hurling League (1): 1964

Louth

- Leinster Junior Football Championship (1): 1966

Leinster

- Railway Cup (1): 1974

Sporting positions
| Preceded by Frank Clarke | Louth Senior Football Captain; 1971 | Succeeded by Jim Thornton |
| Preceded by Leslie Toal | Louth Senior Football Captain; 1975 | Succeeded by Benny Gaughran |
