= Paddy Keenan (Gaelic footballer) =

Irish Gaelic footballer

Personal information
- Native name: Pádraig Ó Cianáin (Irish)
- Nickname: PK
- Born: 1 October 1984 (age 42) Drogheda, County Louth, Ireland
- Occupation: Financial Advisor
- Height: 1.85 m (6 ft 1 in)

Sport
- Sport: Gaelic football
- Position: Midfield
Club
- Years: Club
- 2002–2018: St Patrick's (Naomh Pádraig CLG)
Club titles
- Louth titles: 7
Inter-county
- Years: County
- 2003- 2014: Louth
Inter-county titles
- NFL: 1
- All Stars: 1

Paddy Keenan is an Irish former Gaelic footballer who played for his club St Patrick's of Lordship and the Louth senior team.

== Education ==
Keenan is a graduate of DCU where he obtained an MSC in Business Management and played for DCU in the 2008 Sigerson Cup.

== All Star ==
In October 2010, Keenan was selected on the All Stars football team at midfield for his performances for Louth during the 2010 season.

== 2010 Leinster Football Championship Final ==
He played and scored a point in the 2010 Leinster Football Final defeat to Meath where Louth appeared to be on their way to a first title since 1957, before losing to a late goal.

He helped Louth to win both the Tommy Murphy Cup and the National League Division 2 titles in 2006.

Keenan is Louth's first ever All Star winner since the scheme began in 1971, meaning only Carlow and Longford have never won an All Star in either code. Keenan captained the side that won Louth the NFL Division 3 title in 2011.

== Leinster and Ireland ==
Paddy represented his Province - Leinster - in the Railway Cup. In 2010 he also represented Ireland in the International Rules Series against Australia, participating in both Test matches.

== St Patrick's ==
At club level he has won seven Louth Senior Football Championship titles with St. Patrick's. He captained 'The Pats' in 2007, winning a third Louth SFC title by beating local rivals Cooley Kickhams.

== Inter-County Retirement ==
He retired from inter-county football at the age of 29 in 2014.

== Honours ==
- All Star (1): 2010
- National Football League Division 3 (1): 2011
- National Football League Division 2 (1): 2006
- Tommy Murphy Cup (1): 2006
- Owen Treacy Cup (1): 2006
- McGeough Cup (1): 2011
- Vodafone Player Of The Month (1): June 2010
- GAA Player Of the Week (1): 20 May 2014 - for his performance against Westmeath in the Leinster Senior Football Championship.
- Louth Team Captain: 2009 - 2014
- Louth Senior Football Championship (7): 2003, 2004, 2007, 2011, 2012, 2014, 2015
- Cardinal O'Donnell Cup (5): 2003, 2009, 2012, 2013, 2014
- Paddy Sheelan Cup (1): 2011
- Louth Minor Football Championship (1): 2002
- Louth Minor Football League (1): 2002
- Louth Under-21 Football Championship (1): 2001

| Preceded by Colin Goss | Louth Senior Football Captain; 2009-2014 | Succeeded by Adrian Reid |
