= Colin Goss =

Irish Gaelic footballer

Personal information
- Nickname: Baby Goss
- Height: 6 ft 7 in (201 cm)

Sport
- Sport: Gaelic football
Club
- Years: Club
- St Patrick's
Inter-county
- Years: County
- Louth

Colin Goss is an Irish former Gaelic footballer who played as a defender for St Patrick's and the Louth county team.

He was involved in the 2006 National League Division 2 victory and the 2006 Tommy Murphy Cup victory. He was Louth captain in 2008. He also captained Louth to a Leinster Junior Football Championship title in 2009. With his club he won the Louth Senior Football Championship on seven occasions. Since retiring from inter-county football Goss has done coaching work. He was appointed a selector with the Louth U20s in 2023.
