= Jimmy Mulroy =

Irish Gaelic footballer, manager, and politician (1940–2013)

Senator
- In office 23 April 1987 – 1 November 1989
- Constituency: Nominated by the Taoiseach

Personal details
- Born: James Mulroy; 1 August 1940 Drogheda, County Louth, Ireland
- Died: 12 February 2013 (aged 72) Drogheda, County Louth, Ireland
- Party: Fianna Fáil

Jimmy Mulroy
Personal information
- Occupation: Businessman

Sport
- Sport: Gaelic football
- Position: Right wing-forward
Club
- Years: Club
- Newtown Blues
Club titles
- Louth titles: 9
Inter-county
- Years: County
- 1959–1972: Louth
Inter-county titles
- Leinster titles: 0
- All-Irelands: 0
- NFL: 0
- All Stars: 0

James Mulroy (1 August 1940 – 12 February 2013) was an Irish Gaelic footballer, manager and politician. He played as a right wing-forward for the Louth senior football team and captained the side for several years during the Sixties.

Mulroy made his first appearance for the team during the 1959 championship and was a regular member of the starting fifteen until his retirement after the 1972 championship. He was part of the county panel that reached the final of the Leinster Senior Football Championship in 1960, losing by one point to Offaly. In 1964, he was selected by Leinster and lined out for his province at right half-back in that year's Railway Cup final against Ulster. He appeared in a second inter-provincial final in 1972 against Munster.

At club level Mulroy had a lengthy career with Newtown Blues, winning nine county championship medals.

In retirement from playing Mulroy became involved in coaching and team management. Though he found little success during his two stints as Louth manager, he successfully managed Drogheda side Oliver Plunketts to junior and intermediate championships. Mulroy also coached various teams with his own club Newtown Blues. and the Louth Senior Football Team.

Also well known in political circles, Mulroy was first elected to the Drogheda Corporation and Louth County Council in 1985 as a Fianna Fáil candidate, and he was a member of Seanad Éireann from 1987 to 1989 as a Taoiseach's nominee. He was an unsuccessful candidate for Dáil Éireann in the Louth constituency at the 1987 and 1989 general elections. In 1989, he came within five votes of unseating his Fianna Fáil running mate, Dermot Ahern but was denied a re-count.

Jimmy served twice as Cathaoirleach of Louth County Council and was also Mayor of Drogheda.

== Inter-county honours ==
As player

- O'Byrne Cup: 1963

As manager

- NFL Division 3: 1982–83

Sporting positions
Preceded by Kevin Beahan	Louth Senior Football Captain; 1962–1965	Succeeded by Muckle McKeown
Preceded by Stephen White	Louth Senior Football Manager; 1972–1975	Succeeded by Jack Smith
Preceded by Frank Lynch	Louth Senior Football Manager; 1982–1984	Succeeded by Frank Fagan
