= Louth Senior Football Championship =

Annual Gaelic Athletic Association competition

- Current season or competition: 2026 Louth Senior Football Championship
- Irish: Craobh Shinsearach Peile an Lú
- Founded: 1887
- Trophy: Joe Ward Cup
- Title holders: Newtown Blues
- Most titles: Newtown Blues (24 titles)
- Sponsors: Anchor Tours

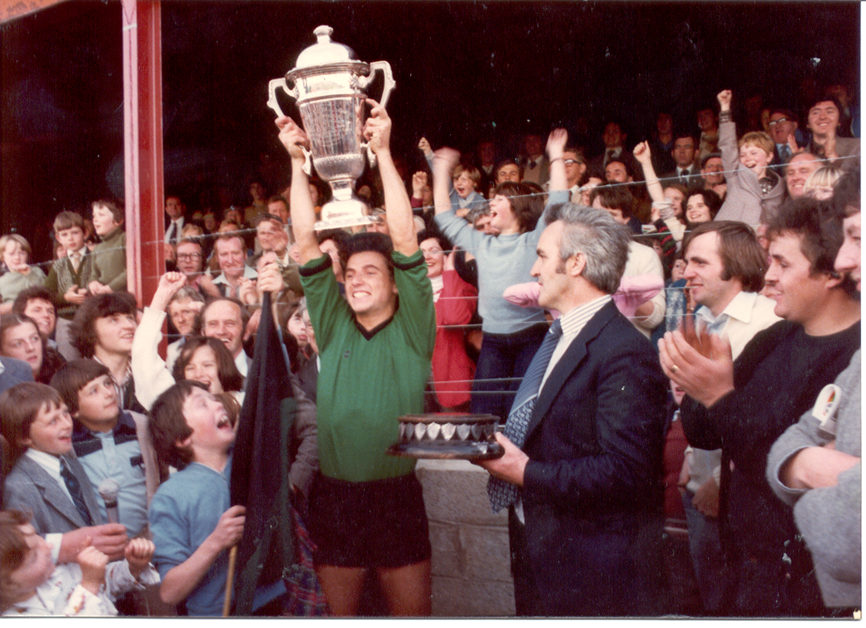
Seamus Haughey (Dundalk Young Irelands) lifting the Joe Ward Cup after his team won the 1979 Louth SFC

The Louth Senior Football Championship is an annual Gaelic Athletic Association competition organised by Louth GAA among the top Gaelic football clubs in County Louth, Ireland. The winning club qualifies to represent the county in the Leinster Senior Club Football Championship, the winner of which progresses to the All-Ireland Senior Club Football Championship.

== Trophy ==
The winning team is presented with the Joe Ward Cup, in memory of the former county Board Chairman. Stabannon Parnells were the first recipients in 1949.

== Top winners ==
#	Team	Wins	Years won
1	Newtown Blues	24	1889, 1932, 1933, 1936, 1961, 1962, 1963, 1964, 1966, 1967, 1969, 1970, 1974, 1981, 1986, 1988, 2000, 2001, 2008, 2013, 2017, 2018, 2019, 2026
2	St Mary's (Ardee)	13	1946, 1948, 1951, 1955, 1956, 1960, 1968, 1972, 1975, 1995, 2022, 2023, 2024
3	Dundalk Young Irelands	11	1887, 1888, 1905, 1911, 1938, 1940, 1941, 1944, 1947, 1950, 1979
4	Cooley Kickhams	9	1935, 1939, 1971, 1973, 1976, 1977, 1978, 1989, 1990
5	Clan na Gael	8	1923, 1924, 1959, 1985, 1987, 1992, 1993, 1998
6	St Patrick's	7	2003, 2004, 2007, 2011, 2012, 2014, 2015
7	Stabannon Parnells	6	1949, 1954, 1991, 1994, 1997, 1999
7	Wolfe Tones	6	1925, 1926, 1927, 1929, 1931, 1937
7	Boyne Rangers	6	1895, 1897, 1898, 1921, 1922, 1930
10	Geraldines	5	1913, 1915, 1916, 1920, 1982
11	Tredaghs (Drogheda)	4	1906, 1909, 1910, 1912
11	Mattock Rangers	4	2002, 2005, 2009, 2010
13	Dundalk Gaels	3	1942, 1945, 1952
13	Drogheda Independents	3	1900, 1901, 1902
13	Naomh Máirtín	3	2020, 2021, 2025
16	Dundalk Rangers	2	1907, 1908
16	Drogheda Stars	2	1917, 1919
16	Roche Emmets	2	1958, 1980
16	St Fechin's	2	1983, 1984
16	St Joseph's	2	1996, 2006
21	Davitts (Drogheda)	1	1890
21	Drogheda Emmets	1	1896
21	Ardee Volunteers	1	1903
21	Glyde Rangers	1	1934
21	St Bride's	1	1943
21	Naomh Mhuire (Drogheda)	1	1953
21	Oliver Plunketts	1	1957
21	Seán O'Mahony's	1	2016
21	Ardee St Mochta's	1	1914
21	Boyne Rovers	1	1904
21	O'Raghallaighs	1	1965
21	Sarsfields (Army team)	1	1928
21	Dundalk O'Rahillys	1	1918

== Finals ==
Year	Winner	Score	Opponent	Score	Winning Captain	Final Venue
1887	Dundalk Young Irelands	0-00, 0-03 (R)	Dowdallshill	0-00, 0-02 (R)	Michael Carroll	Haggardstown
1888	Dundalk Young Irelands	1-01	Dundalk John Dillons	1-00	Michael Carroll	Athletic Grounds
1889	Newtown Blues	1-02	Dreadnots	0-03	James Mooney	Athletic Grounds
1890	Drogheda Davitts	2-04	T.P. Gills (Sandpit)	0-00	Bill Elliott	Bryanstown
1891	No Championship					
1892	No Championship					
1893	No Championship					
1894	No Championship					
1895	Boyne Rangers	0-07	Drogheda Young Irelands	0-03	Michael Gibney	Bryanstown
1896	Drogheda Emmets	1-08	Drogheda Young Irelands	0-02	Jim Rice	Laytown
1897	Boyne Rangers	No score available	Glyde Rangers (Castlebellingham)	No score available	-	Bryanstown
1898	Boyne Rangers	No match - Rangers awarded title				
1899	No Championship					
1900	Drogheda Independents	No match - Independents awarded title				
1901	Drogheda Independents	No match - Independents awarded title				
1902	Drogheda Independents	3-10	Ardee Volunteers	0-04	Jack Carvin	Waterunder
1903	Ardee Volunteers	1-06, 1-07 (R)	Dundalk Young Irelands	1-06, 1-04 (R)	Jimmy Hughes	Waterunder
1904	Boyne Rovers	1-04	John Dillons	0-03	Tom Donegan	Castlebellingham
1905	‡ Dundalk Young Irelands	0-7, 0-03 (R)	Drogheda Tredaghs	0-4, 0-13 (R)	Joe Mulligan	Ardee-Athletic Grounds (R)
1906	Tredaghs	0-08, 0-05 (R)	Geraldines	0-08, 0-03 (R)	Jack Carvin	Castlebellingham
1907	Dundalk Rangers	0-05, 0-12 (R)	John Dillons	0-05, 0-06 (R)	Patrick McCusker	Athletic Grounds
1908	Dundalk Rangers	2-08	Dundalk Young Irelands	0-05	Patrick McCusker	Athletic Grounds
1909	Tredaghs	2-10	Dundalk Rangers	0-04	Jack Carvin	The Grove
1910	Tredaghs	0-05	Geraldines	0-02	Jim Smith	The Grove
1911	Dundalk Young Irelands	2-04	Geraldines	0-06	Joe Mulligan	Athletic Grounds
1912	Tredaghs	1-02, 2-02 (R)	Geraldines	1-02, 0-05 (R)	Jack Bannon	Athletic Grounds-Ardee (R)
1913	Geraldines	2-06	Ardee St Mochta's	0-07	Joe Johnston	Shamrock Lodge
1914	Ardee St Mochta's	1-04	Drogheda Stars	0-01	Owen Mooney	Athletic Grounds
1915	Geraldines	1-05	Tredaghs	0-06	Matt Conachy	Athletic Grounds
1916	Geraldines	3-03	Tredaghs	1-04	Matt Conachy	Shamrock Lodge
1917	Drogheda Stars	0-03	Cooley Kickhams	0-00	Tom Burke	Athletic Grounds
1918	Dundalk O'Rahillys	1-05	Tredaghs	0-02	Andy Tipping	Athletic Grounds
1919	Drogheda Stars	0-04	Dundalk O'Rahillys	0-03	Tom Burke	Shamrock Lodge
1920	Geraldines	W/O	Dundalk O'Rahillys	scr.	-	-
1921	‡ Boyne Rangers	0-01, 0-05 (R)	Éamonn Ceannt's (Ardee)	0-04, 0-05 (R)	Hugh Byrne	Athletic Grounds
1922	Boyne Rangers	3-03	Geraldines	1-00	Hugh Byrne	Athletic Grounds
1923	Clan na Gael	0-03	Boyne Rangers	0-01	Peter Garland	Castlebellingham
1924	Clan na Gael	1-06	Larks (Killineer)	0-01	Peter Garland	Athletic Grounds
1925	Wolfe Tones	W/O	Clan na Gael	scr.	Frank Byrne	-
1926	Wolfe Tones	0-09	Geraldines	1-02	James Owens	Castlebellingham
1927	Wolfe Tones	1-02	Larks	1-00	Frank Byrne	Gaelic Grounds
1928	Sarsfields	4-04	Boyne Rangers	1-02	John McKenna	Athletic Grounds
1929	Wolfe Tones	2-06	O'Connells	0-01	Nicky McKeown	Gaelic Grounds
1930	Boyne Rangers	2-08	Glyde Rangers	1-01	Nicholas Brady	Athletic Grounds
1931	Wolfe Tones	1-04	Newtown Blues	0-04	Mickey McKeown	Gaelic Grounds
1932	Newtown Blues	4-03	St Bride's	2-04	Mick Bell	Athletic Grounds
1933	Newtown Blues	3-03	Clan na Gael	1-07	Jem Moonan	Gaelic Grounds
1934	Glyde Rangers	1-03	Wolfe Tones	0-04	Jimmy Kelly	Athletic Grounds
1935	Cooley Kickhams	2-03	Wolfe Tones	0-04	Jim Murphy	Athletic Grounds
1936	Newtown Blues	3-07	Wolfe Tones	2-06	Gerry Keogh	Gaelic Grounds
1937	Wolfe Tones	2-06	St Mary's	1-02	Mickey McKeown	Athletic Grounds
1938	Dundalk Young Irelands	2-04, 0-08 (R)	St Mary's	1-07, 1-03 (R)	Stephen Fitzsimons	Gaelic Grounds
1939	Cooley Kickhams	3-13	Newtown Blues	1-03	Eddie Boyle	Athletic Grounds
1940	Dundalk Young Irelands	1-09	Dundalk Gaels	0-09	Nick Mulligan	Athletic Grounds
1941	Dundalk Young Irelands	2-09	Cooley Kickhams	1-06	Nick Mulligan	Athletic Grounds
1942	‡ Dundalk Gaels	0-07	St Mary's	2-03	-	Athletic Grounds
1943	St Bride's	3-09	Cooley Kickhams	2-03	Jack Treanor	Athletic Grounds
1944	Dundalk Young Irelands	3-05	Cooley Kickhams	1-01	Jim Quigley	Athletic Grounds
1945	Dundalk Gaels	2-11	St Magdalene's (Drogheda)	1-04	George McAdams	Athletic Grounds
1946	St Mary's	2-07	Dundalk Young Irelands	1-07	Jimmy Beirne	Gaelic Grounds
1947	Dundalk Young Irelands	1-09, 3-05 (R)	Owen Roe's (Drogheda)	2-06, 0-05 (R)	Jim Quigley	Gaelic Grounds-Athletic Grounds (R)
1948	St Mary's	1-09	Dundalk Young Irelands	1-07	Seán Boyle	Gaelic Grounds
1949	Stabannon Parnells	2-02	St Mary's	1-04	Tom Shearman	Athletic Grounds
1950	Dundalk Young Irelands	0-07, 0-08 (R)	St Magdalene's	0-07, 0-05 (R)	Frank Fagan	Athletic Grounds-Gaelic Grounds(R)
1951	St Mary's	3-09	Dundalk Gaels	1-07	Seán Boyle	Gaelic Grounds
1952	Dundalk Gaels	0-08	Dowdallshill	1-02	Jack Regan	Athletic Grounds
1953	Naomh Mhuire	4-10	Oliver Plunketts	0-08	Jim Gavin	Gaelic Grounds
1954	Stabannon Parnells	1-06	St Mary's	0-04	Tom Conlon	Athletic Grounds
1955	St Mary's	0-08	Stabannon Parnells	1-04	Paddy Markey	Gaelic Grounds
1956	St Mary's	2-03	Stabannon Parnells	0-03	Paddy Markey	Athletic Grounds
1957	Oliver Plunketts	3-03	St Mary's	1-06	Terry Doolan	Athletic Grounds
1958	Roche Emmets	1-07	Naomh Mhuire	1-05	Mick Brady	Páirc Mhuire
1959	Clan na Gael	2-04, 0-08 (R)	St Mary's	0-10, 0-05 (R)	Benny Toal	Gaelic Grounds
1960	St Mary's	1-09	Naomh Mhuire	2-04	Johnny Ross	St Brigid's Park
1961	Newtown Blues	1-12	Naomh Mhuire	1-09	Frank Fagan	Gaelic Grounds
1962	Newtown Blues	2-04	Mattock Rangers	1-03	Jimmy Mulroy	Páirc Mhuire
1963	Newtown Blues	1-08	Roche Emmets	1-07	Peter McKenna	St Brigid's Park
1964	Newtown Blues	0-11, 3-08 (R)	Clan na Gael	1-08, 0-04 (R)	Paddy Leech	Páirc Mhuire
1965	O'Raghallaighs	1-09	Newtown Blues	0-05	Noel McDonnell	Gaelic Grounds
1966	Newtown Blues	2-12	Cooley Kickhams	1-04	Liam Leech	St Brigid's Park
1967	Newtown Blues	1-09	Cooley Kickhams	2-05	Matt Murphy	St Brigid's Park
1968	St Mary's	1-07	St Fechin's	0-09	Barney Magennis	Gaelic Grounds
1969	Newtown Blues	1-14	Geraldines	2-05	Frank Clarke	Páirc Mhuire
1970	Newtown Blues	3-08	St Mary's	1-11	Danny Nugent	St Brigid's Park
1971	Cooley Kickhams	2-09	St Mary's	1-06	Harry McCarthy	St Brigid's Park
1972	St Mary's	1-05	Cooley Kickhams	1-02	Tom Rice	St Brigid's Park
1973	Cooley Kickhams	1-09	Mattock Rangers	0-07	Terry Brennan	St Brigid's Park
1974	Newtown Blues	1-04, 1-06 (R)	Cooley Kickhams	1-04, 1-05 (R)	Michael Leech	Páirc Mhuire
1975	St Mary's	1-06, 4-09 (R)	Cooley Kickhams	1-06, 4-03 (R)	Kieran Byrne	Gaelic Grounds
1976	Cooley Kickhams	1-07	Mattock Rangers	0-06	Peadar Gallagher	St Brigid's Park
1977	Cooley Kickhams	2-12	Newtown Blues	2-06	Michael Malone	Páirc Uí Mhuirí
1978	Cooley Kickhams	2-07	St Mary's	1-08	Martin McCarthy	St Brigid's Park
1979	Dundalk Young Irelands	0-11	Cooley Kickhams	1-05	Séamus Haughey	St Brigid's Park
1980	Roche Emmets	2-03	Dundalk Young Irelands	0-06	Mickey Quigley	Páirc Mhuire
1981	Newtown Blues	2-11	Cooley Kickhams	1-06	Davy Byrne	Cluskey Park
1982	Geraldines	1-12	Kilkerley Emmets	0-09	Pat Lynch	St Brigid's Park
1983	St Fechin's	1-08	Geraldines	1-05	Tommy Mulrey	Páirc Mhuire
1984	St Fechin's	2-07	St Joseph's	0-08	Tommy Mulrey	The Grove
1985	Clan na Gael	1-06	Roche Emmets	0-04	Benny McKeever	St Brigid's Park
1986	Newtown Blues	3-05	Kilkerley Emmets	2-07	Dessie Callaghan	Cluskey Park
1987	Clan na Gael	1-07	Newtown Blues	0-04	Peter Fitzpatrick	Páirc Mhuire
1988	Newtown Blues	0-07	Clan na Gael	1-03	Eugene Judge	The Grove
1989	Cooley Kickhams	1-10	St Mary's	0-09	John McDonald	Gaelic Grounds
1990	Cooley Kickhams	0-11	Clan na Gael	0-09	Brendan Burke	St Brigid's Park
1991	Stabannon Parnells	1-11	Clan na Gael	1-09	Donal Murray	St Brigid's Park
1992	Clan na Gael	0-10, 3-11 (R)	Dundalk Gaels	0-10, 1-06 (R)	Peter Fitzpatrick	St Brigid's Park
1993	Clan na Gael	1-12	St Mary's	1-08	Kevin O'Hanlon	Gaelic Grounds
1994	Stabannon Parnells	0-14, 0-12 (R)	St Joseph's	1-11, 1-07 (R)	David Reilly	McGeough Park
1995	St Mary's	1-14	St Patrick's	0-07	Brendan Kerin	Cluskey Park
1996	St Joseph's	2-11	Stabannon Parnells	1-08	Enda McKeown	Páirc Mhuire
1997	Stabannon Parnells	2-12, 0-12 (R)	St Mary's	2-12, 1-06 (R)	Ken Reilly	Gaelic Grounds
1998	Clan na Gael	0-08	Lann Léire	0-04	Gerry Curran	The Grove
1999	Stabannon Parnells	2-09	Kilkerley Emmets	0-04	Nicholas Butterly	McGeough Park
2000	Newtown Blues	0-16	Stabannon Parnells	1-10	Colm Nally	Gaelic Grounds
2001	Newtown Blues	1-13	Mattock Rangers	0-08	Colm Nally	Gaelic Grounds
2002	Mattock Rangers	2-11	St Bride's	1-11	Donal Geraghty	Páirc Mhuire
2003	St Patrick's	3-07, 2-11 (R)	St Mary's	0-16, 0-10 (R)	Seán White	St Brigid's Park
2004	St Patrick's	0-07	Cooley Kickhams	0-06	Darren Kirwan	Clan na Gael Park
2005	Mattock Rangers	1-12	Newtown Blues	2-06	Gerry Hanratty	Gaelic Grounds
2006	St Joseph's	2-07	St Patrick's	0-09	David O'Donoghue	Clan na Gael Park
2007	St Patrick's	1-09	Cooley Kickhams	0-09	Paddy Keenan	St Brigid's Park
2008	Newtown Blues	1-15	Mattock Rangers	1-12	Ray Hughes	Gaelic Grounds
2009	Mattock Rangers	3-12	Cooley Kickhams	0-11	Mark Brennan	Clan na Gael Park
2010	Mattock Rangers	1-08	Cooley Kickhams	0-10	David Reid	Gaelic Grounds
2011	St Patrick's	0-10, 1-12 (R)	Newtown Blues	1-07, 0-09 (R)	Colin Goss	Gaelic Grounds-St Brigid's Park (R)
2012	St Patrick's	1-13	Dreadnots	0-07	Colin Goss	Gaelic Grounds
2013	Newtown Blues	2-15	Cooley Kickhams	0-13	Stephen Moonan	Gaelic Grounds
2014	St Patrick's	1-10	Dreadnots	1-08	Ray Finnegan	Gaelic Grounds
2015	St Patrick's	1-14	Seán O'Mahony's	0-09	Paddy Keenan	Gaelic Grounds
2016	Seán O'Mahony's	1-11	St Mary's	1-09	Shane Brennan	Gaelic Grounds
2017	Newtown Blues	2-10	Dundalk Gaels	0-05	Andy McDonnell	Gaelic Grounds
2018	Newtown Blues	1-11	Naomh Máirtín	1-10	Andy McDonnell	Gaelic Grounds
2019	Newtown Blues	2-09	Naomh Máirtín	1-09	Emmet Carolan	Gaelic Grounds
2020	Naomh Máirtín	1-13	St Mary's	1-09	Mick Fanning	Darver
2021	Naomh Máirtín	1-15	St Mochta's	0-07	Sam Mulroy	Páirc Mhuire
2022	St Mary's	1-12, 1-18 (R)	Newtown Blues	1-12, 1-15 (R)	R.J. Callaghan	Clan na Gael Park-St Brigid's Park (R)
2023	St Mary's	0-15	Naomh Máirtín	1-11	Kian Moran	St Brigid's Park
2024	St Mary's	2-02	Naomh Máirtín	0-04	Liam Jackson/Robbie Leavy	McGeough Park
2025	Naomh Máirtín	1-18	Newtown Blues	1-11	Eoghan Callaghan	Gaelic Grounds
2026	Newtown Blues	1-15, 0-12 (R)	St Mochta's	1-15, 0-11 (R)	Ciarán Downey	Gaelic Grounds

‡ Ceannt's won the first final 0-4 to 0-1, but the result was overturned following an objection. The replay ended in a draw. Title was awarded to Boyne Rangers because Éamonn Ceannt's were unable to field a team for the second replay, as some of their players were under arrest.

Title awarded to Dundalk Gaels after objection. St Mary's fielded an ineligible player

First match was abandoned due to pitch invasion with Young Irelands leading 0-7 to 0-4. The Replay finished 0-13 to 0-3 in favour of Tredaghs. Title was awarded to Young Irelands after objection, due to Tredaghs fielding an ineligible player

== See also ==
- Mulligan, Fr.John (1984). The GAA in Louth - An Historical Record.
- Mulligan, Fr.John (2000). The GAA in Louth - An Historical Record (updated).
