= Lordship, County Louth =

Census town in County Louth, Ireland

Coordinates: 53.9999°N 6.2646°W

Lordship An Tiarnas
- Rural area and census town
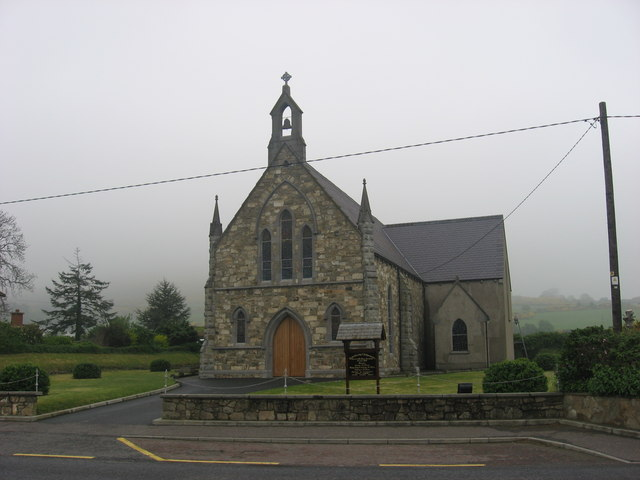
- Church of St. Mary, Lordship
- Interactive map of Lordship
- Country: Ireland
- County: Louth
- Civil parish: Ballymascanlan

Population (2016 census)
  - Total: 486
- Time zone: UTC+0 (GMT)
  - Summer (DST): UTC+1 (IST)

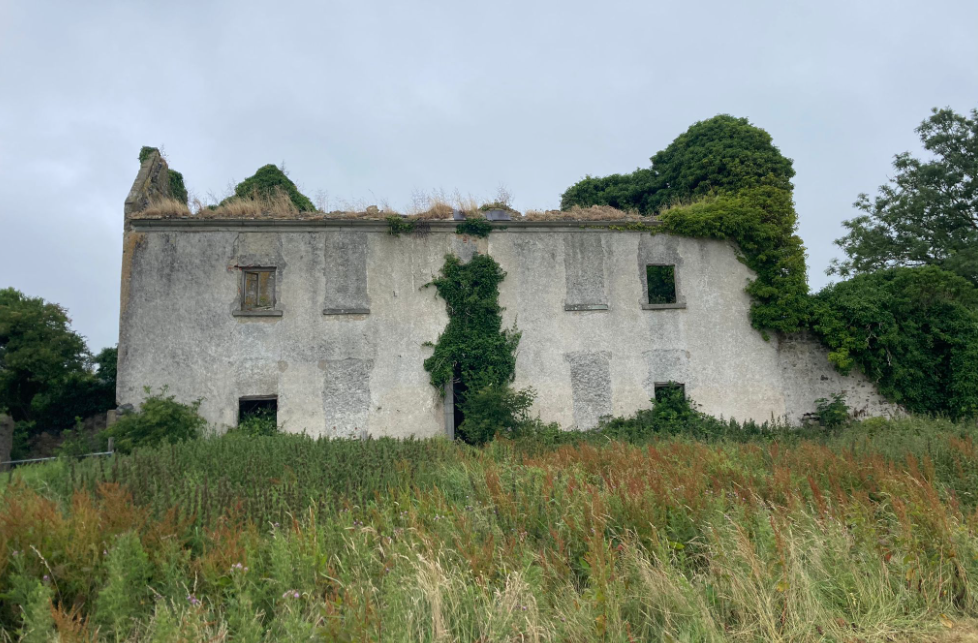
Piedmont House is a protected structure (LHS008-003)

Lordship (Irish: An Tiarnas) is a rural area and census town in County Louth, Ireland. It is located in the civil parish of Ballymascanlan.

The local Roman Catholic church, the Church of St Mary, was built c. 1860 and is in the parish of Lordship & Ballymascanlon of the Roman Catholic Archdiocese of Armagh. The church, which is in Piedmont townland, is included in the Record of Protected Structures maintained by Louth County Council. Other protected structures in Piedmont townland include a disused 19th century railway bridge on the former Dundalk, Newry and Greenore Railway line, and Piedmont House - a ruined late 17th century house associated with the Townley family of Townley Hall.

The local Gaelic Athletic Association club is St Patrick's. Founded in 1953, the club has won the Louth Senior Football Championship on several occasions.

Lordship was designated as a census town by the Central Statistics Office for the first time in the 2016 census, at which time it had a population of 486 people.

== See also ==
- Jenkinstown, County Louth
- Lordship Credit Union
