= Andy McDonnell =

Louth Gaelic footballer

Personal information
- Born: 1990/1991

Sport
- Sport: Gaelic football
Club
- Years: Club
- Newtown Blues
Club titles
- Louth titles: 4
Inter-county
- Years: County
- Louth
- Leinster titles: 1

Andy McDonnell is an Irish Gaelic footballer who plays as a midfielder and forward for Newtown Blues and the Louth county team.

McDonnell played for Louth up until 2021 when he retired after the game against Antrim, having made 93 appearances. He played for Louth in the 2010 Leinster Senior Football Championship final. He was no longer involved when Louth returned to that in the 2023 Leinster Senior Football Championship final.

But McDonnell eventually would win a Leinster Senior Football Championship title in 2025 after he returned from a four-year exile for that year. By the time he retired again at the end of 2025, McDonnell had made 10 more appearances to take him to a total of 103. Between his retirements he took up a media role as a newspaper columnist, when he took over from Seamus O'Hanlon as GAA columnist with the Drogheda Independent and The Argus.
