= Paddy Sheelan Cup =

Senior league Gaelic competition

- Founded: 1952
- Title holders: Cooley Kickhams
- Most titles: Cooley Kickhams (16)

The Paddy Sheelan Cup is an annual subsidiary league competition organised by Louth GAA for Senior and Intermediate grade Gaelic football clubs in County Louth.

== History ==
The competition was launched in 1952 and Dundalk Gaels were the first winners. The Old Gaels Cup was presented to the winning team until 1978, when ACC Bank was brought in as sponsor. The ACC Cup was presented to the winners for the last time in 2003. In 2004, the captain of the winning Cooley Kickhams team received the Paddy Sheelan Cup, named in honour of a former Kickhams stalwart, for the first time.

== Format ==
Teams are split into groups, with the four best performing teams qualifying for the semi-final stage. The two semi-final victors then face off in the final of the competition.

== Roll of Honour ==
#	Team	Wins	Years won
1	Cooley Kickhams	16	1965, 1967, 1968, 1969, 1971, 1973, 1974, 1984, 1987, 1998, 2003, 2004, 2005, 2006, 2014, 2026
2	Newtown Blues	10	1962, 1963, 1966, 1970, 1986, 1997, 2007, 2012, 2015, 2022
3	St Mary's	9	1955, 1956, 1959, 1972, 1978, 1983, 2016, 2018, 2021
4	Clan na Gael	6	1979, 1982, 1991, 1992, 1993, 1999
5	Roche Emmets	4	1960, 1981, 2001, 2008
6	St Patrick's	3	1976, 2002, 2011
6	St Fechin's	3	1980, 1989, 1990
6	O'Raghallaighs	3	1964, 1977, 2010
6	Mattock Rangers	3	2009, 2017, 2024
10	Stabannon Parnells	2	1995, 2000
10	Dundalk Gaels	2	1952, 1994
10	Oliver Plunketts	2	1953, 1958
10	Dundalk Young Irelands	2	1957, 1985
10	Naomh Mhuire (Drogheda)	2	1954, 1961
15	Dreadnots	1	2019
15	St Bride's	1	1975
15	Naomh Máirtín	1	2023
15	Kilkerley Emmets	1	1988
15	O'Connells	1	2013
15	St Joseph's	1	2025

== List of Finals ==
(R) = Replay

(AET) = After Extra-Time

Year	Winner	Score	Opponent	Score	Venue
1952	Dundalk Gaels	3-04	St Bride's	0-07	Athletic Grounds
1953	Oliver Plunketts	3-03	Dundalk Young Irelands	1-07	Páirc Mhuire
1954	Naomh Mhuire	1-09	Oliver Plunketts	1-04	Gaelic Grounds
1955	St Mary's	2-11	Dundalk Gaels	2-06	The Grove
1956	St Mary's	1-07	Stabannon Parnells	1-05	Páirc Mhuire
1957	Dundalk Young Irelands	3-09 (R)	Naomh Mhuire	1-01 (R)	The Grove
1958	Oliver Plunketts	1-06 (R)	Dundalk Gaels	0-02 (R)	The Grove
1959	St Mary's	4-05	Newtown Blues	1-06	The Grove
1960	Roche Emmets	2-06	Newtown Blues	1-05	The Grove
1961	Naomh Mhuire	1-08	Clan na Gael	0-07	The Grove
1962	Newtown Blues	2-10	Mattock Rangers	0-05	The Grove
1963	Newtown Blues	3-08	St Patrick's	0-03	The Grove
1964	O'Raghallaighs	1-05	Clan na Gael	1-02	Páirc Uí Mhuirí
1965	Cooley Kickhams	3-12 (R) (AET)	O'Raghallaighs	3-10 (R) (AET)	St Brigid's Park
1966	Newtown Blues	0-12	St Mary's	0-07	Gaelic Grounds
1967	Cooley Kickhams	2-06	Clan na Gael	1-06	St Brigid's Park
1968	Cooley Kickhams	1-06	Newtown Blues	0-05	St Brigid's Park
1969	Cooley Kickhams	0-06	Mattock Rangers	0-05	St Brigid's Park
1970	Newtown Blues	3-05	St Bride's	0-06	The Grove
1971	Cooley Kickhams	0-09	Mattock Rangers	0-08	Clan na Gael Park
1972	St Mary's	1-07	St Bride's	1-06	Páirc Mochta
1973	Cooley Kickhams	1-10 (R)	St Bride's	1-08 (R)	Clan na Gael Park
1974	Cooley Kickhams	3-02	Mattock Rangers	2-03	Knockbridge
1975	St Bride's	0-11	O'Raghallaighs	0-07	The Grove
1976	St Patrick's	2-09	Roche Emmets	0-12	St Brigid's Park
1977	O'Raghallaighs	1-07	St Fechin's	0-07	The Grove
1978	St Mary's	1-07	Roche Emmets	1-04	St Brigid's Park
1979	Clan na Gael	1-15 (R)	Mattock Rangers	1-05 (R)	Cluskey Park
1980	St Fechin's	3-08	Clan na Gael	1-09	The Grove
1981	Roche Emmets	0-03	Dreadnots	0-02	The Grove
1982	Clan na Gael	1-08	Geraldines	0-07	Knockbridge
1983	St Mary's	2-07 (R)	Cooley Kickhams	2-06 (R)	Knockbridge
1984	Cooley Kickhams	2-04	St Joseph's	0-04	St Brigid's Park
1985	Dundalk Young Irelands	2-07	Mattock Rangers	0-06	Páirc Mochta
1986	Newtown Blues	0-14	Clan na Gael	1-04	The Grove
1987	Cooley Kickhams	2-05	Oliver Plunketts	0-07	Knockbridge
1988	Kilkerley Emmets	0-06	Dreadnots	0-05	Knockbridge
1989	St Fechin's	1-06	Cooley Kickhams	1-05	McGeough Park
1990	St Fechin's	1-09	Clan na Gael	1-06	Stabannon
1991	Clan na Gael	1-08 (R)	Stabannon Parnells	0-08 (R)	McGeough Park
1992	Clan na Gael	1-14	St Joseph's	1-11	St Brigid's Park
1993	Clan na Gael	1-10	Newtown Blues	0-05	Stabannon
1994	Dundalk Gaels	1-08	Naomh Máirtín	1-05	The Grove
1995	Stabannon Parnells	1-08	St Patrick's	1-06	Páirc de Róiste
1996	Not Held				
1997	Newtown Blues	2-11	Cooley Kickhams	1-12	The Grove
1998	Cooley Kickhams	0-09	Kilkerley Emmets	0-07	St Brigid's Park
1999	Clan na Gael	1-09 (R)	Cooley Kickhams	2-04 (R)	Páirc Na nGael
2000	Stabannon Parnells	1-11	Cooley Kickhams	1-07	Clan na Gael Park
2001	Roche Emmets	2-13	St Mary's	0-14	Knockbridge
2002	St Patrick's	2-05	Mattock Rangers	1-06	The Grove
2003	Cooley Kickhams	2-10	St Mary's	0-10	Páirc Na nGael
2004	Cooley Kickhams	0-15	Clan na Gael	1-06	St Brigid's Park
2005	Cooley Kickhams	2-12	Clan na Gael	1-06	Páirc Na nGael
2006	Cooley Kickhams	1-10	St Patrick's	1-07	Páirc Na nGael
2007	Newtown Blues	1-14	St Joseph's	0-07	Páirc Seán Mistéal
2008	Roche Emmets	2-13	Naomh Máirtín	1-12	Cluskey Park
2009	Mattock Rangers	2-10 (R)	Newtown Blues	1-12 (R)	Gaelic Grounds
2010	O'Raghallaighs	0-14	Glyde Rangers	2-07	Páirc Mattock
2011	St Patrick's	2-10	Naomh Malachi	0-07	Fr McEvoy Park
2012	Newtown Blues	2-13 (AET)	O'Connells	2-12 (AET)	Páirc Uí Mhuirí
2013	O'Connells	0-14	St Patrick's	2-07	Fr McEvoy Park
2014	Cooley Kickhams	1-11	Dreadnots	0-08	Clan na Gael Park
2015	Newtown Blues	1-08	St Mary's	0-09	Páirc Dreadnots
2016	St Mary's	3-15	Cooley Kickhams	1-08	Darver
2017	Mattock Rangers	2-11	St Patrick's	1-11	Cluskey Park
2018	St Mary's	1-12	Mattock Rangers	2-07	Stabannon
2020	Cancelled (COVID-19)				
2019	Dreadnots	1-15	St Mochta's	0-08	Páirc Dreadnots
2021	St Mary's	6-16	St Mochta's	0-04	Darver
2022	Newtown Blues	1-12	St Mochta's	0-09	Darver
2023	Naomh Máirtín	1-11	Mattock Rangers	0-04	Darver
2024	Mattock Rangers	2-09	St Joseph's	1-11	Darver
2025	St Joseph's	2-15	Kilkerley Emmets	0-11	Fr McEvoy Park
2026	Cooley Kickhams	2-14	St Bride's	3-07	Fr McEvoy Park
