= Newtown Blues GAC =

Louth-based Gaelic games club

Newtown Blues
- Gormaithe Bhaile Nua
- County: Louth
- Colours: Sky blue and white
- Grounds: Newfoundwell Road, Drogheda
- Coordinates: 53°43′36″N 6°19′27″W

Playing kits
Standard colours

Senior Club Championships
	All Ireland	Leinster champions	Louth champions
Football:	-	-	23

Newtown Blues are a Gaelic Athletic Association club from Drogheda, County Louth, Ireland. The club fields Gaelic football teams in competitions organised by Louth GAA. They are the most successful club in Louth football, winning the Louth Senior Football Championship on twenty-three occasions as of 2025. Their most recent title came in 2019.

The Blues' clubrooms and pitches are located in Drogheda's east, near St. Joseph's secondary school on the Newfoundwell road. The club's colours are sky blue and white.

In July of 1887, the club was founded in Johnny Morgan's pub in Newtown. Success quickly followed in 1889 when the club entered and won the third ever Louth Senior Football Championship, beating Dreadnots of Clogherhead in the county final held at the Dundalk Athletic Grounds. The team went on to represent Louth in the second ever Leinster Senior Football Championship later that year. The Blues qualified for the final at Inchicore on 13 October 1889, but succumbed to Laois champions Maryborough, 0-03 to 0-02.

In 1909 the club dropped out of football in Louth, but returned to the county scene in 1924. The Blues won the MacArdle Cup for the Louth Junior League in 1928. In 1931 at senior level, they won the O'Hanlon Cup. The following year saw the Blues retain the O'Hanlon Cup. In 1933 the club reigned supreme at senior level, winning all three County Board competitions. The Blues have achieved this feat on two further occasions in their history, in 1963 and 1986.

The Sixties represented the greatest decade in the history of Newtown Blues. The Joe Ward cup for the Louth Senior Football Championship was won seven times, including a record four in-a-row from 1961-64.

The club represented Louth in the final of the inaugural Leinster Senior Club Football Championship in 1970, when they lost by three points at Croke Park to the Offaly champions Gracefield.

== Notable players ==
- Jamie Carr
- Ciarán Downey
- Ian Harte
- Colm Judge
- Colin Kelly
- Andy McDonnell
- Jimmy Mulroy
- Ged Nash
- Danny Nugent

== Honours ==
- Louth Senior Football Championship (23): 1889, 1932, 1933, 1936, 1961, 1962, 1963, 1964, 1966, 1967, 1969, 1970, 1974, 1981, 1986, 1988, 2000, 2001, 2008, 2013, 2017, 2018, 2019, 2026
- Louth Senior Football League (14): 1933, 1962, 1963, 1964, 1965, 1969, 1977, 1981, 1984, 1986, 2005, 2010, 2018, 2022
- O'Hanlon Cup (2): 1931, 1932, 1933
- Louth Junior Football Championship (1): 1958
- Old Gaels/ACC/Paddy Sheelan Cup (10): 1962, 1963, 1966, 1970, 1986, 1997, 2007, 2012, 2015, 2022
- Louth Junior A Football League (1): 1928
- Louth Junior 2A Football Championship (3): 1996, 2004, 2010
- Louth Junior 2B Football Championship (1): 2025
- Louth Junior 2A Football League (6): 1970, 1982, 1997, 2006, 2007, 2009
- Louth Minor Football Championship (8): 1956, 1957, 1958, 1970, 1975, 2004, 2014, 2015
- Louth Under-21 Football Championship (8): 1978, 1979, 1996, 1999, 2004, 2005, 2017, 2018
