= St Patrick's GAA (Louth) =

Louth-based Gaelic games club

St Patrick's
- Naomh Pádraig CLG
- Founded: 1953
- County: Louth
- Nickname: The Pats
- Colours: Green and White
- Grounds: Páirc Éamon, Rampark, Lordship
- Coordinates: 54.00077°N 6.26399°W

Playing kits
Standard colours

Senior Club Championships
	All Ireland	Leinster champions	Louth champions
Football:	0	0	7

St Patrick's GAA is a Gaelic Athletic Association (GAA) club that fields Gaelic football teams in competitions organised by Louth GAA. It is located in Lordship on the Cooley Peninsula in north County Louth. The club has a local rivalry with peninsula neighbours Cooley Kickhams.

As of 2023, the club was competing in the Louth Senior Championship and Division 1 of the county football Leagues. Former Dublin defender Johnny Magee is senior team manager.

== History ==
Founded in 1953, the club reached the final of the Louth Senior Football Championship for the first time in 1995, losing by ten points to St Mary's of Ardee at Cluskey Park in Dromiskin.

In 2003 the club returned to the county final under the management of Peter Fitzpatrick. St Patrick's beat St Mary's 2–11 to 0–10 in a replay to clinch their first Joe Ward Cup. Powered by Louth All-Star Paddy Keenan and several other inter-county players, the club would go on to win seven Senior Championships by the end of 2015.

== Honours ==
- Louth Senior Football Championship (7): 2003, 2004, 2007, 2011, 2012, 2014, 2015
- Cardinal O'Donnell Cup (6): 1999, 2003, 2009, 2012, 2013, 2014
- Old Gaels/ACC/Paddy Sheelan Cup (3): 1976, 2002, 2011
- Louth Intermediate Football Championship (2): 1980, 1984
- Louth Intermediate Football League (1): 1984
- Dealgan Milk Products Shield (2): 1980, 1983
- Louth Junior Football Championship (2): 1960, 1972
- Louth Junior A Football League (2): 1970, 1972
- Louth Junior 2A Football Championship (6): 1997, 1998, 1999, 2003, 2006, 2024
- Louth Junior 2A Football League (3): 1966, 2000, 2019
- Louth Junior 2 Football League (Division 4D) (1): 2010
- Louth Under-21 Football Championship (1): 2001
- Louth Minor Football Championship (3): 1990, 2002, 2024
- Louth Minor Football League (5): 1992, 2001, 2002, 2013‡, 2025

‡ Shared with Cúchulainn Gaels

== Inter-county players ==
St Patrick's players who have represented Louth at senior inter-county level include:

- Henry Donnelly
- Eugene Sheelan
- Darren Kirwan
- Jim Holland
- Colin Goss
- Paddy Keenan
- Paudie Mallon
- Ray Finnegan
- Dessie Finnegan
- Seán Connor
- Eoin O'Connor
- Eoghan Lafferty
- Leonard Grey
