= St Mary's GAA (Louth) =

Louth-based Gaelic games club

St Mary's
- Naomh Muire
- Founded: 1928
- County: Louth
- Colours: Blue and White
- Grounds: DEFY Páirc Mhuire
- Coordinates: 53°50′31″N 6°32′36″W

Playing kits
Standard colours

Senior Club Championships
	All Ireland	Leinster champions	Louth champions
Football:	-	-	13

St Mary's GAA is a Gaelic Athletic Association club from Ardee, County Louth, Ireland. The club fields Gaelic football teams in competitions organized by Louth GAA.

== History ==
The club was founded in 1928. In 1955 St Mary's won all three Senior club competitions (Old Gaels Cup, Cardinal O'Donnell Cup and Senior Championship) and went on to repeat this feat in 1956. As of 2022, the club had competed in 26 Louth Senior Football Championship finals, winning 10.

By 2023, St Mary's had won their 12th county title, after defeating Naomh Máirtín in the 2023 Louth Senior Football Championship final.

The club won a third consecutive Joe Ward Cup (Louth SFC) in 2024, again overcoming Naomh Máirtín in the final, by 2-02 to 0-04. St Mary's went on to reach the final of the Leinster Senior Club Football Championship, losing by one point to Cuala of Dublin at Croke Park.

Down native Cathal Murray, who oversaw a period in which the club became a "dominant force in Louth football", was the senior team manager until 2025. He left after completing the Louth SFC three-in-a-row.

== Achievements ==
- Louth Senior Football Championship (13): 1946, 1948, 1951, 1955, 1956, 1960, 1968, 1972, 1975, 1995, 2022, 2023, 2024
- Louth Senior Football League (13): 1947, 1949, 1952, 1953, 1954, 1955, 1956, 1971, 1975, 1991, 2002, 2021, 2024
- Louth Senior Football League Division 1B (1): 2004
- Louth Intermediate Football League (1): 1987
- Old Gaels/ACC/Paddy Sheelan Cup (9): 1955, 1956, 1959, 1972, 1978, 1983, 2016, 2018, 2021
- Louth Junior 2A Football Championship (7): 1945, 1969, 1989, 2014, 2015, 2017, 2018
- Louth Junior 2A Football League (10): 1945, 1949, 1978, 1980, 1988, 2010, 2013, 2023, 2024, 2025

== Notable players ==
- Dermot O'Brien
- Kevin Beahan
- Ronan Carroll
- Darren Clarke
- Tommy Durnin
- Ciarán Keenan
- Liam Jackson
- Donal McKenny
