= Dundalk Gaels GFC =

Louth-based Gaelic games club

Dundalk Gaels
- Na Gaeil, Dún Dealgan
- Founded: 1928
- County: Louth
- Colours: Blue and White
- Grounds: Páirc Na nGael, the Ramparts, Dundalk
- Coordinates: 53.99832°N 6.40186°W

Playing kits
Standard colours

Dundalk Gaels GFC is a Gaelic Athletic Association (GAA) club based in Dundalk, County Louth, Ireland which fields Gaelic football teams in competitions organised by Louth GAA. Managed by Kevin McKernan, Dundalk Gaels was, as of 2025, the only Dundalk town club competing at senior championship and senior league level in Louth football.

== Catchment area ==
The club recruits members from Dundalk neighbourhoods Carrick Road, Avenue Road, Hill Street and Dublin Road.

== Rivalries ==
The club's main rivals are cross-town neighbours Clan na Gael, to whom they lost in the 1992 Louth SFC final replay. Additionally, matches against Seán O'Mahony's and Dundalk Young Irelands are always keenly contested.

== Notable players ==
- Joe Carroll - columnist with Dundalk Democrat newspaper. Goalkeeper in 1973 on last Louth team to beat Dublin in the Leinster Senior Football Championship.
- Paddy Cheshire - Appeared as a Louth substitute against Carlow in opening round of 1957 Leinster Championship.
- Derek Crilly - Forward who played for Louth between 2008 and 2017.
- Dylan McKeown - Captain of Dundalk Gaels. Lifted the Seamus Flood cup in 2024 and the division 2 league trophy in 2025. Part of the Louth squad from 2023 onwards.
- Bertie Dullaghan - Forward. Played against Carlow in opening round of Louth's successful 1957 Leinster Senior Football Championship campaign. Won Louth SFC medal in 1952.
- Paul Kenny - Former county defender who managed Louth to two Leinster semi-finals in 1996 and 1997 during his three years in charge.
- Willie Lawless - won Railway Cup medal at right-half forward for Leinster in 1928. Member of 1933 Gaels side that won Junior Championship honours. County team selector in 1950 when Louth reached the All-Ireland final.

== Honours ==
- Louth Senior Football Championship (3): 1942, 1945, 1952
- Senior Football League Champions (3): 1942, 1943, 1944
- Leinster Intermediate Club Football Championship (1): 2003
- Louth Intermediate Football Championship (5): 1987, 1991, 2003, 2007, 2024
- Louth Junior Football Championship (2): 1933, 1986
- Louth Under-21 Football Championship (2): 1991, 1992
- Louth Minor Football Championship (6): 1933, 1934, 1962, 1974, 1989, 1997
- Louth Minor B Football Championship (2): 2008, 2021
- Old Gaels/ACC Cup (2): 1952, 1994
- Louth Intermediate Football League (6): 2003, 2006, 2007, 2012, 2016, 2025
- Louth Junior A Football League (2): 1983, 1985
- Dealgan Milk Products Shield/Grogan Cup (2): 1991, 2006
- Drogheda and Dundalk Dairies Shield (3): 1983, 1984, 1985
- Louth Junior 2A Football Championship (1): 2011
- Louth Junior 2B Football Championship (1): 2006
- Louth Junior 2A Football League (3): 1986, 1995, 2017
- Louth Junior 2 Football League Division 4B (1): 2003

== External sources ==
- Official website
