= 2024 Louth county football team season =

Louth county football team
2024 season
- Manager: Ger Brennan
- NFL D2: 6th
- All-Ireland SFC: Quarter-finalist
- Leinster SFC: Finalist
- O'Byrne Cup: Quarter-finalist (Shield Winner)
- Top goalscorer: League: Sam Mulroy; All: Sam Mulroy

The following is a summary of Louth county football team's 2024 season.

== Competitions ==
=== O'Byrne Cup ===
==== Fixtures ====
6 January 2024
19:00 IWT (UTC±0)
Match 7

Report

Meath	2-13 (19) – (10) 1-07	Louth
(HT: 1-05 – 1-04)

Páirc Tailteann, Navan

=== O'Byrne Shield ===
Teams defeated in their first match played in a shield tournament, which Louth won.

==== Fixtures ====
13 January 2024
13:00 IWT (UTC±0)
Match C

Westmeath	0-12 (12) – (18) 2-12	Louth

Coralstown/Kinnegad GAA, Kinnegad

10 February 2024
12:00 IWT (UTC±0)
Match D (Shield Final)

Report

Louth	1-18 (21) – (16) 2-10	Wicklow
(HT: 0-8 – 1-4)

Dowdallshill, Dundalk
Referee: Ian Howley

=== National Football League Division 2 ===
Louth began with an away fixture against Armagh.

On 6 December 2023, the GAA announced that all Division 2 Round 7 games would be played separately from the Round 7 games in Division 1, 3 and 4, on Saturday, 23 March 2024, at 19:00, including Kildare v Louth at Dr Cullen Park. The rest of the fixtures were also confirmed on 6 December 2023.

==== Table ====
Pos	Team	Pld	W	D	L	PF	PA	PD	Pts	Qualification
1	Donegal	7	6	1	0	128	83	+45	13	Advance to NFL Division 2 Final and promotion to 2025 NFL Division 1
2	Armagh	7	5	2	0	132	86	+46	12	Advance to NFL Division 2 Final and promotion to 2025 NFL Division 1
3	Cavan (Note: Cavan are ranked ahead of Cork because they won the head-to-head game between the teams)	7	3	1	3	103	117	−14	7	
4	Cork	7	3	1	3	119	125	−6	7	
5	Meath (Note: Meath are ranked ahead of Louth because they won the head-to-head game between the teams)	7	2	2	3	86	105	−19	6	
6	Louth	7	3	0	4	121	101	+20	6	
7	Fermanagh	7	2	1	4	94	129	−35	5	Relegation to 2025 NFL Division 3
8	Kildare	7	0	0	7	82	119	−37	0	Relegation to 2025 NFL Division 3

Source: GAA.ie
Rules for classification: Tiebreakers

==== Fixtures ====
27 January 2024 Round 1	Armagh	0-12 (12) – (11) 0-11	Louth	Armagh
				Venue: Athletic Grounds
	Pts: Aidan Forker 1, Rory Grugan 2 (1f), Stefan Campbell 3, Conor Turbitt 5 (4f), Oisín Conaty 1	Report	Pts: Dermot Campbell 1, Tommy Durnin 1, Paul Mathews 1, Ciaran Keenan 1, Conor Grimes 1, Ryan Burns 1, Sam Mulroy 3f, Ciaran Downey 2	Referee: Thomas Murphy (Galway); Attendance: 10,452

4 February 2024 Round 2	Louth	2-09 (15) – (13) 0-13	Cork	Ardee
13:00 IST (UTC+1)				Venue: Páirc Mhuire
	Gls: Ciarán Keenan 1, Ciarán Downey 1 Pts: Craig Lennon 2, Paul Mathews 1, Ryan Burns 1, Sam Mulroy 5 (4f, 1 '45)	Report	Pts: Patrick Doyle 1 (1 '45), Tommy Walsh 1, Ian Maguire 1, Colm O’Callaghan 1, Eoghan McSweeney 2, Chris Óg Jones 2, Brian Hurley 4 (3f), Mark Cronin 1 (1f)	Referee: Martin McNally (Monaghan)

18 February 2024 Round 3	Meath	1-11 (14) – (12) 1-09	Louth	Navan
14:00 IST (UTC+1)				Venue: Páirc Tailteann
	Gls: Matthew Costello 1 Pts: Daithi McGowan 2 (1 m), Eoghan Frayne 2, Jack O'Connor 2, Matthew Costello 2 (2f), Shane Walsh 3	Report	Gls: Tom Jackson 1 Pts: Tommy Durnin 1, Ciarán Keenan 1, Ryan Burns 4, Sam Mulroy 3 (2f, 1 m)	Referee: Liam Devenney (Mayo)

25 February 2024 Round 4	Louth	3-09 (18) – (19) 2-13	Cavan	Ardee
14:00 IST (UTC+1)				Venue: Páirc Mhuire
	Gls: Ryan Burns 1, Sam Mulroy 2 (1 pen); Pts: Tommy Durnin 1, Ciarán Keenan 2, Conor Grimes 2, Sam Mulroy 2fs, Ciarán Downey 1, Tom Jackson 1	Report	Gls: James Smith 1, Gerard Smith 1 Pts: Cian Madden 2, Caoimhín O'Reilly 2 (1 m), Paddy Lynch 8 (6fs, 1 '45), Cormac O’Reilly 1	Referee: Niall Cullen (Fermanagh)

3 March 2024 Round 5	Donegal	1-17 (20) – (15) 0-15	Louth	Ballyshannon
14:00 IST (UTC+1)				Venue: Fr Tierney Park
	Gls: Jeaic Mac Ceallabhuí 1 Pts: Caolan McGonagle 1, Michael Langan 1, Shane O'Donnell 2, Patrick McBrearty 8 (7f), Oisín Gallen 4, Aaron Doherty 1	Report	Pts: Donal McKenny 1, Ciarán Keenan 1, Conor Grimes 2, Ryan Burns 2, Sam Mulroy 7 (5f, 1 m), Liam Jackson 1	Referee: Paddy Neilan (Roscommon)

16 March 2024 Round 6	Louth	6-17 (35) – (11) 0-11	Fermanagh	Ardee
13:00 IST (UTC+1)				Venue: Páirc Mhuire
	Gls: P Lynch 1, C Downey 1, C Grimes 1, S Mulroy 2, T Jackson 1 Pts: D Campbell 1, P Lynch 1, C Downey 3, T Durnin 1, C Keenan 3, C Grimes 2, R Burns 1, S Mulroy 5 (2fs)	Report	Pts: D McCusker 1, S McGullion 1, U Kelm 1, G Jones 3fs, S Cassidy 3 (1f), F O’Brien 1, D King 1	Referee: Seán Hurson (Tyrone)

23 March 2024 Round 7	Kildare	0-12 (12) – (15) 1-12	Louth	Carlow
19:00 IST (UTC+1)				Venue: Dr Cullen Park
	Pts: P Woodgate 5 (3fs, 1 '45), A Masterson 3, K Feely 2fs, D Kirwan 1, P McDermott 1, D Flynn 1	Report	Gls: R Burns 1 Pts: S Mulroy 5 (4fs, 1 '45), R Burns 2, T Jackson 2, C Grimes 1, L Grey 1, C Downey 1	Referee: Joe McQuillan (Cavan)

=== Leinster Senior Football Championship ===
The draw for the 2024 Leinster Championship was made on 21 October 2023, with Louth drawn to face Carlow or Wexford in the quarter-final.

Niall Sharkey went travelling after the Leinster Championship.

==== Bracket ====
Preliminary round

Quarter-finals

Semi-finals

Final

Dublin
3-19

Longford
3-12

Meath
0-12

Meath
3-19

Dublin
3-22

Offaly
0-11

Laois
1-08

Offaly
2-13

Dublin
1-19

Westmeath
1-11

Louth
2-12

Wicklow
2-09

Kildare
0-16

Wicklow
1-12

Kildare
0-13

Carlow
0-08

Louth
0-17

Wexford
4-19

Louth
4-10

Wexford
0-15

==== Fixtures ====
14 April 2024 Quarter-final	Louth	4-10 (22) – (15) 0-15	Wexford	Portlaoise
16:00 IST (UTC+1)				Venue: O'Moore Park

28 April 2024 Semi-final	Kildare	0-13 (13) – 0-17 (17)	Louth	Dublin
14:00 IST (UTC+1)				Venue: Croke Park

RTÉ

12 May 2024
13:45 IST (UTC+1)
Final

Report

Dublin	1-19 (22) – 2-12 (18)	Louth
(HT: 0-6 – 0-7)
Gls: O'Callaghan 1 (1m), Pts: Costello 6 (4f), Fenton 3, Basquel 1, Bugler 1, Lahiff 1, Mannion 1, Kilkenny 1, P Small 1		Gls: Keenan & Lennon 1-0, Pts: Mulroy 6 (5f), Grimes 4, Downey & Durnin 1.

Croke Park, Dublin
Referee: Noel Mooney (Cavan)
Attendance: 23,113

GK	1	Stephen Cluxton (Parnells)
RCB	2	Cian Murphy (Thomas Davis)
FB	3	Michael Fitzsimons (Cuala)
LCB	4	Eoin Murchan (Na Fianna)
RHB	5	Tom Lahiff (St Jude's)
CHB	6	John Small (Ballymun Kickhams)
LHB	7	Seán Bugler (St Oliver Plunketts/Eoghan Ruadh)
MF	8	Brian Fenton (Raheny)
MF	9	James McCarthy (Ballymun Kickhams) (c)
RHF	10	Ciarán Kilkenny (Castleknock)
CHF	11	Cormac Costello (St Vincent's)
LHF	12	Niall Scully (Templeogue Synge Street)
RCF	13	Paul Mannion (Kilmacud Crokes)
FF	14	Con O'Callaghan (Cuala)
LCF	15	Colm Basquel (Ballyboden St Enda's)
Substitutes:
	16	Jack McCaffrey (Clontarf) for Scully
	17	Paddy Small (Ballymun Kickhams) for Basquel
	18	Brian Howard (Raheny) for Lahiff
	19	Ross McGarry (Ballyboden St Enda's) for Bugler
	20	Killian McGinnis (Skerries Harps) for Mannion

GK	1	Niall McDonnell (St Fechin's)
RCB	2	Dan Corcoran (Geraldines)
FB	3	Peter Lynch (Roche Emmets)
LCB	4	Donal McKenny (St Mary's)
RHB	5	Niall Sharkey (Glyde Rangers)
CHB	6	Anthony Williams (Dreadnots)
LHB	7	Conall McKeever (Clan na Gael)
MF	8	Tommy Durnin (Inniskeen Grattans, Monaghan)
MF	9	Bevan Duffy (St Fechin's)
RHF	10	Ciarán Downey (Newtown Blues)
CHF	11	Ciarán Keenan (St Mary's)
LHF	12	Conor Grimes (Glen Emmets)
RCF	13	Leonard Grey (St Patrick's)
FF	14	Sam Mulroy (Naomh Máirtin) (c)
LCF	15	Craig Lennon (St Mochta's)
Substitutes:
	16	Dermot Campbell (Dreadnots) for Sharkey
	17	Conor Early (Na Fianna, Dublin) for Williams
	18	Ciarán Byrne (St Mochta's) for Durnin
	19	Ryan Burns (Hunterstown Rovers) for Keenan
	20	Liam Jackson (St Mary's) for Grey

=== All-Ireland Senior Football Championship ===
Louth were drawn into Group 4.

==== Table ====
Pos	Team	Pld	W	D	L	PF	PA	PD	Pts	Qualification
1	Kerry	3	3	0	0	75	36	+39	6	Advance to quarter-final
2	Louth	3	1	1	1	48	52	−4	3	Advance to preliminary quarter-final
3	Monaghan	3	1	1	1	50	57	−7	3	Advance to preliminary quarter-final
4	Meath	3	0	0	3	35	63	−28	0	

Source: GAA

==== Fixtures ====
25 May 2024 Round 1	Louth	3-10 - 0-09	Meath	Inniskeen
17:30	Mulroy 1-6 (6f), Lennon 2-1, Downey 0-1, Duffy 0-1, Keenan 0-1	Report	Frayne 0-3 (2f), Caulfield 0-1, Coffey 0-1, Costello 0-1, Hickey 0-1, Jones 0-1, O'Sullivan 0-1 (1m)	Stadium: Grattan Park; Referee: Paul Faloon (Down)

2 June 2024 Round 2	Monaghan	2-10 - 2-10	Louth	Clones
15:30	Bannigan 1-1, McCarthy 1-0, McManus 0-2f, Beggan 0-1f, Duffy 0-1m, McCarron 0-1f, McNulty 0-1, Mohan 0-1, O'Toole 0-1, Wilson 0-1	Report	Mulroy 0-7 (6f,1'45), Lennon 1-0, Grimes 1-0, Burns 0-2, Downey 0-1	Stadium: St Tiernach's Park; Referee: Fergal Kelly (Longford)

16 June 2024 Round 3	Kerry	2-21 - 1-10	Louth	Portlaoise
15:00	Clifford 0-7 (5f), Clifford 1-2, O'Connor 1-1, Ó Beaglaoich 0-3, O'Connor 0-2, O'Shea 0-2 (1f), Brosnan 0-1, Moynihan 0-1, Murphy 0-1, O'Sullivan 0-1	Report	McKenny 1-0, Mulroy 0-3 (2f), Grimes 0-2, Byrne 0-1, Duffy 0-1, Keenan 0-1, Lennon 0-1, Mathews 0-1	Stadium: O'Moore Park; Referee: Conor Lane (Cork)

Louth advanced to a preliminary quarter-final against Cork, which they won, in a surprise victory to qualify for a first ever All-Ireland SFC quarter-final. Louth were knocked out in the quarter-final.

Preliminary quarter-finals
Tyrone	0-12
Roscommon	0-14
Mayo	1-12 (3)
Derry (pens.)	0-15 (4)
Louth	1-09
Cork	1-08
Galway*	0-14
Monaghan	0-11

Quarter-finals
Armagh	2-12
Roscommon	0-12
Kerry*	0-15
Derry	0-10
Donegal*	1-23
Louth	0-18
Dublin*	0-16
Galway*	0-17

Semi-finals
Armagh (a.e.t.)	1-18
Kerry*	1-16
Donegal*	0-15
Galway*	1-14

Final
Armagh	1-11
Galway*	0-13

23 June 2024 Preliminary Quarter-Final	Louth	1-09 - 1-08	Cork	Inniskeen
15:00	Mulroy 0-4f, McKenny 1-0, Burns 0-2, Lennon 0-2, Matthews 0-1	Report	O'Callaghan 0-3, O'Mahony 1-0, Jones 0-2, Hurley 0-1, Maguire 0-1, O'Driscoll 0-1	Stadium: Grattan Park; Referee: Noel Mooney (Cavan)

30 June 2024 Quarter-Final	Donegal	1-23 - 0-18	Louth	Dublin
13:15	Mogan 0-5, Gallen 0-4 (1f), Gallagher 1-0, Langan 0-3, McHugh 0-2, Moore 0-2, O'Donnell 0-2, Thompson 0-2, Brennan 0-1, Doherty 0-1, McBrearty 0-1,	Report	Mulroy 0-6 (4f), Durnin 0-4, Burns 0-2, Byrne 0-2, Early 0-1, L Jackson 0-1, T Jackson 0-1, Lennon 0-1	Stadium: Croke Park; Attendance: 47,406; Referee: Joe McQuillan (Cavan); Man of the Match: Peadar Mogan (Donegal)

== Notable events ==
- Louth appeared in consecutive Leinster finals for the first time since 1957 and 1958.
- Louth defeated Meath in the championship for the first time since 1975.
- Louth reached the All-Ireland SFC quarter-finals for the first time. (They had reached the semi-finals and final on previous occasions, but had not reached the quarter-finals since that stage was introduced in 2001.)
- Sam Mulroy scored seven goals in league and championship.

James Califf retired ahead of this season.

This was Niall McDonnell's breakthrough season. McDonnell first played for Louth against Meath in the 2024 O'Byrne Cup, followed by his National League debut against Armagh in the 2024 NFL.

Four Louth players were nominated for All Stars at the end of the season: Tommy Durnin, Donal McKenny, Craig Lennon, and captain Sam Mulroy.
