= 2024 Leinster Senior Football Championship final =

- Event: 2024 Leinster Senior Championship
Dublin	Louth
1–19	2–12
- Date: 12 May 2024
- Venue: Croke Park, Dublin
- Referee: Noel Mooney (Cavan)
- Attendance: 22,113

The 2024 Leinster Senior Football Championship final was played at Croke Park in Dublin on 12 May 2024. It was contested by Dublin and Louth. Dublin won a 14th consecutive title.

== Match details ==
12 May 2024
13:45 (UTC+1)

Dublin	1–19 – 2–12	Louth
Con O'Callaghan 1-4 (1m), Cormac Costello 0-6 (3f), Brian Fenton 0-3, Paul Mannion 0-1, Colm Basquel 0-1, Sean Bugler 0-1, Ciaran Kilkenny 0-1, Tom Lahiff 0-1, Paddy Small 0-1	Report	Sam Mulroy 0-6 (5f), Conor Grimes 0-4, Ciaran Keenan 1-0, Craig Lennon 1-0, Ciaran Downey 0-1, Tommy Durnin 0-1

Croke Park, Dublin
Attendance: 22,113
Referee: Noel Mooney (Cavan)

GK	1	Stephen Cluxton (Parnells)
RCB	2	Cian Murphy (Thomas Davis)
FB	3	Michael Fitzsimons (Cuala)
LCB	4	Eoin Murchan (Na Fianna)
RHB	5	Tom Lahiff (St Jude's)
CHB	6	John Small (Ballymun Kickhams)
LHB	7	Seán Bugler (St Oliver Plunketts/Eoghan Ruadh)
MF	8	Brian Fenton (Raheny)
MF	9	James McCarthy (Ballymun Kickhams) (c)
RHF	10	Ciarán Kilkenny (Castleknock)
CHF	11	Cormac Costello (St Vincent's)
LHF	12	Niall Scully (Templeogue/Synge Street)
RCF	13	Paul Mannion (Kilmacud Crokes)
FF	14	Con O'Callaghan (Cuala)
LCF	15	Colm Basquel (Ballyboden St Enda's)
Substitutes:
	16	Jack McCaffrey (Clontarf) for Scully
	17	Paddy Small (Ballymun Kickhams) for Basquel
	18	Brian Howard (Raheny) for Lahiff
	19	Ross McGarry (Ballyboden St Enda's) for Bugler
	20	Killian McGinnis (Skerries Harps) for Mannion

GK	1	Niall McDonnell (St Fechin's)
RCB	2	Dan Corcoran (Geraldines)
FB	3	Peter Lynch (Roche Emmets)
LCB	4	Donal McKenny (St Mary's)
RHB	5	Niall Sharkey (Glyde Rangers)
CHB	6	Anthony Williams (Dreadnots)
LHB	7	Conall McKeever (Clan na Gael)
MF	8	Tommy Durnin (Inniskeen Grattans, Monaghan)
MF	9	Bevan Duffy (St Fechin's)
RHF	10	Ciarán Downey (Newtown Blues)
CHF	11	Ciarán Keenan (St Mary's)
LHF	12	Conor Grimes (Glen Emmets)
RCF	13	Leonard Grey (St Patrick's)
FF	14	Sam Mulroy (Naomh Máirtín) (c)
LCF	15	Craig Lennon (St Mochta's)
Substitutes:
	16	Dermot Campbell (Dreadnots) for Sharkey
	17	Conor Early (Na Fianna, Dublin) for Williams
	18	Ciarán Byrne (St Mochta's) for Durnin
	19	Ryan Burns (Hunterstown Rovers) for Keenan
	20	Liam Jackson (St Mary's) for Grey
