= 2024 Leinster Senior Football Championship =

Gaelic football season

2024 Leinster SFC
Tournament details
- Year: 2024

Winners
- Champions: Dublin (63rd win)
- Manager: Dessie Farrell
- Captain: James McCarthy

Runners-up
- Runners-up: Louth

The 2024 Leinster Senior Football Championship was the 2024 iteration of the Leinster Senior Football Championship organised by Leinster GAA. Dublin were the defending champions.

Dublin retained the title after a 1-19 to 2-12 win against Louth in the final on 12 May, it was a 14th Leinster title in a row for Dublin.

== Teams ==
=== General Information ===
Eleven counties will compete in the Leinster Senior Football Championship:

County	Last Championship Title	Last All-Ireland Title	Position in 2023 Championship	Last losing finalist
Carlow	1944	—N/a	Preliminary round	1942
Kildare	2000	1928	Semi-finals	2022
Dublin	2023	2023	Champions	2001
Laois	2003	—N/a	Quarter-finals	2018
Longford	1968	—N/a	Preliminary round	1965
Louth	1957	1957	Runners-up	2023
Meath	2010	1999	Quarter-finals	2020
Offaly	1997	1982	Semi-finals	2006
Westmeath	2004	—N/a	Quarter-finals	2016
Wexford	1945	1918	Preliminary round	2011
Wicklow	—N/a	—N/a	Quarter-finals	1897

== Bracket ==
Preliminary round

Quarter-finals

Semi-finals

Final

Dublin
3-19

Longford
3-12

Meath
0-12

Meath
3-19

Dublin
3-22

Offaly
0-11

Laois
1-08

Offaly
2-13

Dublin
1-19

Westmeath
1-11

Louth
2-12

Wicklow
2-09

Kildare
0-16

Wicklow
1-12

Kildare
0-13

Carlow
0-08

Louth
0-17

Wexford
4-19

Louth
4-10

Wexford
0-15

== Matches ==
=== Preliminary round ===
7 April 2024 Preliminary round	Wexford	4-19 (31) – (8) 0-08	Carlow	Wexford
14:30 IST (UTC+1)				Venue: Wexford Park
		Report		Referee: Derek O'Mahoney (Tipperary)

7 April 2024 Preliminary round	Longford	3-12 (21) – (28) 3-19	Meath	Longford
15:00 IST (UTC+1)				Venue: Pearse Park
		Report		Referee: Niall Cullen (Fermanagh)

7 April 2024 Preliminary round	Westmeath	1-11 (14) – (15) 2-09	Wicklow	Portlaoise
15:30 IST (UTC+1)				Venue: O'Moore Park
		Report		Referee: Paddy Neilan (Roscommon)

=== Quarter-finals ===
13 April 2024 Quarter-finals	Laois	1-08 (11) – (19) 2-13	Offaly	Portlaoise
19:00 IST (UTC+1)				Venue: O'Moore Park
		Report

14 April 2024 Quarter-finals	Kildare	0-16 (16) – (15) 1-12	Wicklow	Portlaoise
13:45 IST (UTC+1)				Venue: O'Moore Park

14 April 2024 Quarter-finals	Louth	4-10 (22) – (15) 0-15	Wexford	Portlaoise
16:00 IST (UTC+1)				Venue: O'Moore Park

14 April 2024 Quarter-finals	Dublin	3-19 (28) – (12) 0-12	Meath	Dublin
16:30 IST (UTC+1)				Venue: Croke Park

=== Semi-finals ===
28 April 2024 Semi-finals	Kildare	0-13 (13) – 0-17 (17)	Louth	Dublin
14:00 IST (UTC+1)				Venue: Croke Park

28 April 2024 Semi-finals	Dublin	3-22 (31) – 0-11 (11)	Offaly	Dublin
16:00 IST (UTC+1)				Venue: Croke Park

=== Final ===
RTÉ

12 May 2024
13:45 IST (UTC+1)
Final

Report

Dublin	1-19 (22) – 2-12 (18)	Louth
(HT: 0-6 – 0-7)
Gls: O'Callaghan 1 (1m), Pts: Costello 6 (4f), Fenton 3, Basquel 1, Bugler 1, Lahiff 1, Mannion 1, Kilkenny 1, P Small 1		Gls: Keenan & Lennon 1-0, Pts: Mulroy 6 (5f), Grimes 4, Downey & Durnin 1.

Croke Park, Dublin
Referee: Noel Mooney (Cavan)
Attendance: 23,113

GK	1	Stephen Cluxton (Parnells)
RCB	2	Cian Murphy (Thomas Davis)
FB	3	Michael Fitzsimons (Cuala)
LCB	4	Eoin Murchan (Na Fianna)
RHB	5	Tom Lahiff (St Jude's)
CHB	6	John Small (Ballymun Kickhams)
LHB	7	Seán Bugler (St Oliver Plunketts/Eoghan Ruadh)
MF	8	Brian Fenton (Raheny)
MF	9	James McCarthy (Ballymun Kickhams) (c)
RHF	10	Ciarán Kilkenny (Castleknock)
CHF	11	Cormac Costello (St Vincent's)
LHF	12	Niall Scully (Templeogue/Synge Street)
RCF	13	Paul Mannion (Kilmacud Crokes)
FF	14	Con O'Callaghan (Cuala)
LCF	15	Colm Basquel (Ballyboden St Enda's)
Substitutes:
	16	Jack McCaffrey (Clontarf) for Scully
	17	Paddy Small (Ballymun Kickhams) for Basquel
	18	Brian Howard (Raheny) for Lahiff
	19	Ross McGarry (Ballyboden St Enda's) for Bugler
	20	Killian McGinnis (Skerries Harps) for Mannion

GK	1	Niall McDonnell (St Fechin's)
RCB	2	Dan Corcoran (Geraldines)
FB	3	Peter Lynch (Roche Emmets)
LCB	4	Donal McKenny (St Mary's)
RHB	5	Niall Sharkey (Glyde Rangers)
CHB	6	Anthony Williams (Dreadnots)
LHB	7	Conall McKeever (Clan na Gael)
MF	8	Tommy Durnin (Inniskeen Grattans, Monaghan)
MF	9	Bevan Duffy (St Fechin's)
RHF	10	Ciarán Downey (Newtown Blues)
CHF	11	Ciarán Keenan (St Mary's)
LHF	12	Conor Grimes (Glen Emmets)
RCF	13	Leonard Grey (St Patrick's)
FF	14	Sam Mulroy (Naomh Máirtín) (c)
LCF	15	Craig Lennon (St Mochta's)
Substitutes:
	16	Dermot Campbell (Dreadnots) for Sharkey
	17	Conor Early (Na Fianna, Dublin) for Williams
	18	Ciarán Byrne (St Mochta's) for Durnin
	19	Ryan Burns (Hunterstown Rovers) for Keenan
	20	Liam Jackson (St Mary's) for Grey

== See also ==
- 2024 All-Ireland Senior Football Championship
- 2024 Connacht Senior Football Championship
- 2024 Munster Senior Football Championship
- 2024 Ulster Senior Football Championship
- 2024 Tailteann Cup (Tier 2)
- 2024 All-Ireland Junior Football Championship (Tier 3)
