= 2025 Leinster Senior Football Championship final =

- Event: 2025 Leinster Senior Championship
Louth	Meath
3–14	1–18
- Date: 11 May 2025
- Venue: Croke Park, Dublin
- Referee: Martin McNally (Monaghan)
- Attendance: 65,786

The 2025 Leinster Senior Football Championship final was played at Croke Park in Dublin on 11 May 2025. It was contested by Louth and Meath. Louth, with Sam Mulroy as captain, won their ninth championship and their first in 68 years.

== Match details ==
11 May 2025
16:15 (UTC+1)

Louth	3–14 – 1–18	Meath
Sam Mulroy 1-7 (1pen, 2f, 1tpf, 1'45), Ryan Burns 1-3 (1tp), Craig Lennon 1-1, Ciarán Downey 0-1, Bevan Duffy 0-1, Conor Grimes 0-1	Report	Mathew Costello 1-1, Eoghan Frayne 0-4 (2f), Billy Hogan 0-4 (2tpf), Ruairí Kinsella 0-4 (1tp), Sean Coffey 0-1, James Conlon 0-1, Keith Curtis 0-1, Donal Keogan 0-1, Jordan Morris 0-1

Croke Park, Dublin
Attendance: 65,786
Referee: Martin McNally (Monaghan)

GK	1	Niall McDonnell (St Fechin's)
RCB	2	Dáire Nally (Newtown Blues)
FB	3	Dermot Campbell (Dreadnots)
LCB	4	Donal McKenny (St Mary's)
RHB	5	Conall McKeever (Clan na Gael)
CHB	6	Peter Lynch (Roche Emmets)
LHB	7	Craig Lennon (St Mochta's)
MF	8	Tommy Durnin (St Mary's)
MF	9	Andy McDonnell (Newtown Blues)
RHF	10	Bevan Duffy (St Fechin's)
CHF	11	Ciarán Downey (Newtown Blues)
LHF	12	Conor Grimes (Glen Emmets)
RCF	13	Ryan Burns (Hunterstown Rovers)
FF	14	Sam Mulroy (Naomh Máirtín) (c)
LCF	15	Kieran McArdle (St Bride's)
Substitutes:
	16	Ciarán Keenan (St Mary's) for McArdle
	17	Paul Matthews (St Fechin's) for Andy McDonnell
	18	Ciarán Byrne (St Mochta's) for Burns
	19	Dara McDonnell (Naomh Mairtín) for Duffy
	20	Emmet Carolan (Newtown Blues) for Nally

GK	1	Billy Hogan (Longwood)
RCB	2	Séamus Lavin (St Peter's Dunboyne)
FB	3	Seán Rafferty (Na Fianna)
LCB	4	Brian O'Halloran (Ballivor)
RHB	5	Donal Keogan (Rathkenny)
CHB	6	Seán Coffey (Ballinabrackey)
LHB	7	Ciarán Caulfield (Trim)
MF	8	Jack Flynn (Ratoath)
MF	9	Bryan Menton (Donaghmore/Ashbourne)
RHF	10	Conor Duke (Dunshaughlin)
CHF	11	Ruairí Kinsella (Dunshaughlin)
LHF	12	Keith Curtis (Rathkenny)
RCF	13	Mathew Costello (Dunshaughlin)
FF	14	James Conlon (St Colmcille's)
LCF	15	Eoghan Frayne (Summerhill) (c)
Substitutes:
	16	Jordan Morris (Kingscourt Stars, Cavan) for Curtis
	17	Shane Walsh (Na Fianna) for Duke
	18	Aaron Lynch (Trim) for Kinsella
	20	Daithí McGowan (Ratoath) for Conlon
