= 2025 Leinster Senior Football Championship =

Gaelic football tournament

2025 Leinster SFC
Tournament details
- Province: Leinster
- Year: 2025
- Trophy: Delaney Cup
- Date: April – May 2025
- Defending champions: Dublin

Winners
- Champions: Louth (9th win)
- Manager: Ger Brennan
- Captain: Sam Mulroy

Runners-up
- Runners-up: Meath
- Manager: Robbie Brennan
- Captain: Eoghan Frayne

The 2025 Leinster Senior Football Championship was the 2025 iteration of the annual Leinster Senior Football Championship organised by Leinster GAA. It was one of the four provincial competitions of the 2025 All-Ireland Senior Football Championship. The winning team received the Delaney Cup. The draw for the championship was made on 12 October 2024.

The defending champion was Dublin; however, Dublin could not retain the title after losing to Meath in the semi-final. This was Dublin's first loss in the Leinster SFC in 15 years and broke a run of 14 consecutive championship wins.

Louth defeated Meath by 3–14 to 1–18 in the final to win a first Leinster SFC title for 68 years.

== Teams ==
=== General Information ===
Eleven counties competed in the Leinster Senior Football Championship:

County	Last Championship Title	Last All-Ireland Title	Position in 2024 Championship
Carlow	1944	—N/a	Preliminary round
Kildare	2000	1928	Semi-finals
Dublin	2024	2023	Champions
Laois	2003	—N/a	Quarter-finals
Longford	1968	—N/a	Preliminary round
Louth	1957	1957	Runners-up
Meath	2010	1999	Quarter-finals
Offaly	1997	1982	Semi-finals
Westmeath	2004	—N/a	Preliminary round
Wexford	1945	1918	Quarter-finals
Wicklow	—N/a	—N/a	Quarter-finals

== Draw ==
=== Pot 1 ===
- Dublin
- Kildare
- Louth
- Offaly

=== Pot 2 ===
- Carlow
- Longford
- Meath
- Offaly
- Westmeath
- Wexford
- Wicklow

== Bracket ==
Preliminary round
5 April, Wexford
Wexford	2-11
Laois	2-21
6 April, Longford
Longford	1-20
Wicklow	2-23
6 April, Navan
Meath	1-30
Carlow	0-19

Quarter-finals
12 April, Newbridge
Kildare	2-17
Westmeath	0-21
13 April, Newbridge
Louth	2-16
Laois	1-17
13 April, Newbridge
Dublin	2-21
Wicklow	0-18
13 April, Navan
Offaly	0-21
Meath	1-25

Semi-finals
27 April, Tullamore
Kildare	0-18
Louth	1-18
27 April, Portlaoise
Dublin	1-16
Meath	0-23

Final
11 May, Dublin
Louth	3-14
Meath	1-18

== Preliminary round ==
=== Matches ===
5 April 2025 Preliminary round	Wexford	2-11 – 2-21	Laois	Wexford
6.00pm				Venue: Wexford Park
	Gls: Michael Kinsella 1, Seán Ryan 1 Pts: Darragh Brooks 2 (1tpf), Eoin Porter 1, Niall Hughes 1, Mark Rossiter 5 (3f), Kevin O’Grady 2	Report	Gls: Patrick O’Sullivan 1, Daniel O’Reilly 1 Pts: Killian Roche 1 (45'), Trevor Collins 1, Pa Kirwan 3, Mark Barry 7 (2f), Daniel O’Reilly 1, Ronan Coffey 6 (1tp,1tpf), Brian Byrne 1, Jonah Kelly 1	Referee: David Murnane (Cork)

6 April 2025 Preliminary round	Meath	1-30 – 0-19	Carlow	Navan
3.00pm				Venue: Pairc Tailteann
	Gls: Ruairi Kinsella 1 Pts: Ciaran Caulfield 1, Jack Flynn 3 (1tp), Bryan Menton 1, Conor Duke 2, Ruairi Kinsella 5 (1tp), Jack Kinlough 2, Keith Curtis 2 (1tp), Mathew Costello 4 (2f), Eoghan Frayne 7 (1tp, 1tpf, 2f), Diarmuid Moriarty 2, Jason Scully 1	Report	Pts: Ciaran Moran 2 (1tp), Paddy McDonnell 1, Ross Dunphy 1, Conor Doyle 5 (1tp, 1tpf, 1 '45), Kevin Murphy 4 (1tpf, 1f), Conor Crowley 3 (1f, 1m), Niall Hickey 3 (1tp)	Referee: Paul Faloon (Down)

6 April 2025 Preliminary round	Longford	1-20 – 2-23	Wicklow	Longford
3.30pm				Venue: Pearse Park
	Gls: Padraig O’Toole 1, Kevin Quinn 1 Pts: Joe Prendergast 1, Patrick Keane 2, Dean Healy 3 (1tp), Liam O’Neill 1, John Paul Nolan 1 ('45), Padraig O’Toole 1, Oisin McGraynor 7 (1tp, 1f), Kevin Quinn 5 (4f), Christopher O’Brien 1, Mark Jackson 1 (‘45)	Report	Gls: Dessie Reynolds 1 Pts: James Moran 1, Jayson Matthews 4 (2f), Dylan Farrell 3 (1tpf), Aaron Farrell 1, Matthew Carey 7 (1tpf, 1tp, 2f), Cathal McCabe 1m, Oran Kenny 3 (1tp)	Referee: Liam Devenney (Mayo)

== Quarter-finals ==
=== Matches ===
12 April 2025 Quarter-final	Kildare	2-17 – 0-21	Westmeath	Newbridge
				Venue: St Conleth's Park
	Gls: David Hyland 1, Alex Beirne 1 Pts: David Hyland 2 (1tp), Colm Dalton 1, Alex Beirne 5 (3fs), Ben McCormack 2, Ryan Sinkey 2, Darragh Kirwan 1, Brian McLoughlin 2 (1tp)	Report	Pts: Jamie Gonoud 1, Sam McCartan 1, Ray Connellan 1, Kevin O'Sullivan 1, Danny McCartan 3, Robbie Forde 2, Luke Loughlin 11 (1tp, 1tpf, 1f)	Referee: David Gough (Meath)

13 April 2025 Quarter-final	Dublin	2-21 – 0-18	Wicklow	Aughrim
				Venue: Aughrim Park
	Gls: Niall Scully 1, Con O’Callaghan 1 Pts: Greg McEneaney 1, Tom Lahiff 3 (1tp), Niall Scully 1, Sean Bugler 2, Ciaran Kilkenny 3, Con O’Callaghan 7 (1tp, 1f), Colm Basquel 2	Report	Pts: Joe Prendergast 1, Patrick O’Keane 1, Dean Healy 4 (1tp), Pádraig O’Toole 1, Darragh Fee 1, Oisin McGraynor 5 (1tp, 1f), Kevin Quinn 3 (1tp), Mark Kenny 2 (1tp)	Referee: Seamus Mulhare (Laois)

13 April 2025 Quarter-final	Offaly	0-21 – 1-25	Meath	Navan
2.30pm				Venue: Pairc Tailteann
	Pts: Paddy Dunican 5 (1 '45, 2tpf), Cormac Egan 1, Kyle Higgins 2 (1tp), Keith O’Neill 6 (2tp, 1f); Dylan Hyland 4 (3fs), Jack Bryant 1, Shane Tierney 2	Report	Gls: James Conlon 1 Pts: Billy Hogan 2 (1tpf), Seán Coffey 1, Jack Flynn 2 (1tp), Bryan Menton 1, Conor Duke 4 (2tp), Mathew Costello 9 (2fs, 1tp, 1tpf), Eoghan Frayne 3 (1f, 1tpf), Aaron Lynch 1, James Conlon 2	Referee: Seán Lonergan (Tipperary)

13 April 2025 Quarter-final	Louth	2-16 – 0-17	Laois	Newbridge
3.00pm				Venue: St Conleth's Park
	Gls: Ciarán Byrne 1, Ryan Burns 1 (pen); Pts: Peter Lynch 1, Andy McDonnell 1, Ciarán Downey 3, Conor Grimes; Kieran McArdle 1, Ciarán Byrne 3, Ryan Burns 4 (1 ’45, 1f), Tommy Durnin 1, Craig Lennon 1, Dylan McKeown 1	Report	Pts: Damon Larkin 2, Daniel O’Reilly 1, Ronan Coffey 3 (1f), Kevin Swayne 1, Mark Barry 8 (4fs), Niall Corbet 1, Brian Byrne 1	Referee: Paddy Neilan (Roscommon)

== Semi-finals ==
Colm O'Rourke wrote before the semi-finals: "Meath's chance is determined by how far the mighty have fallen. Dublin can disimprove by 10 points and still beat everyone in Leinster... it is still a stretch to think that Meath might beat a vulnerable Dublin team who survived quite easily in Division 1". On the other game he wrote: "Kildare should be able for an understrength Louth".

=== Matches ===
The first semi-final was preceded by a 2025 Ulster SFC semi-final at St Tiernach's Park, carried live by the BBC. Former Dublin player Philly McMahon was working on that broadcast. When the Ulster SFC semi-final had concluded, presenter Mark Sidebottom informed McMahon live on air what was happening in Dublin's Leinster SFC semi-final: "Philly", said Mark Sidebottom. "I want to bring you some really big breaking news from Portlaoise. Half-time: Meath 17 points, Dublin five." McMahon said, "Jesus", and he looked at Oisín McConville and Conor McManus, who were also in the studio. "April Fool's?" hen wondered.

As the hooter sounded Meath had a three-point lead and a free in front of the Dublin goal. The only way for Dublin to stay in the Leinster SFC was if Eoghan Frayne struck the post, the ball had come back into play, a Dublin player had retrieved the ball and then scored a goal that would have brought about extra-time. This did not happen.

27 April 2025 Semi-final	Meath	0-23 – 1-16	Dublin	Portlaoise
4.00pm				Venue: O'Moore Park

27 April 2025 Semi-final	Kildare	0-18 – 1-18	Louth	Tullamore
2.00pm				Venue: O'Connor Park

== Final ==
=== Leinster final ===
11 May 2025 Final	Meath	1-18 – 3-14	Louth	Dublin
4.15pm				Venue: Croke Park
	Gls: M. Costello 1-0; Pts: E. Frayne 0-4 (2f), B. Hogan 0-4 (2 2pf), R. Kinsella 0-4 (1 2p), S. Coffey, J. Conlon, M. Costello, K. Curtis, D. Keogan, J. Morris 0-1 each	Report	Gls: R. Burns, C. Lennon, S. Mulroy (pen) 1-0 each Pts: S. Mulroy 0-7 (2f, 1 2pf, 1 '45), R. Burns 0-3 (1 2p), C. Downey, B. Duffy, C. Grimes, C. Lennon 0-1 each	Referee: Martin McNally (Monaghan); Attendance: 65,786

GK	1	Billy Hogan (Longwood)
RCB	2	Séamus Lavin (St Peter's Dunboyne)
FB	3	Seán Rafferty (Na Fianna)
LCB	4	Brian O'Halloran (Ballivor)
RHB	5	Donal Keogan (Rathkenny)
CHB	6	Seán Coffey (Ballinabrackey)
LHB	7	Ciarán Caulfield (Trim)
MF	8	Jack Flynn (Ratoath)
MF	9	Bryan Menton (Donaghmore/Ashbourne)
RHF	10	Conor Duke (Dunshaughlin)
CHF	11	Ruairí Kinsella (Dunshaughlin)
LHF	12	Keith Curtis (Rathkenny)
RCF	13	Mathew Costello (Dunshaughlin)
FF	14	James Conlon (St Colmcille's)
LCF	15	Eoghan Frayne (Summerhill) (c)
Substitutes:
	16	Jordan Morris (Kingscourt Stars, Cavan) for Curtis
	17	Shane Walsh (Na Fianna) for Duke
	18	Aaron Lynch (Trim) for Kinsella
	19	Daithí McGowan (Ratoath) for Conlon

GK	1	Niall McDonnell (St Fechin's)
RCB	2	Dáire Nally (Newtown Blues)
FB	3	Dermot Campbell (Dreadnots)
LCB	4	Donal McKenny (St Mary's)
RHB	5	Conall McKeever (Clan na Gael)
CHB	6	Peter Lynch (Roche Emmets)
LHB	7	Craig Lennon (St Mochta's)
MF	8	Tommy Durnin (St Mary's)
MF	9	Andy McDonnell (Newtown Blues)
RHF	10	Bevan Duffy (St Fechin's)
CHF	11	Ciarán Downey (Newtown Blues)
LHF	12	Conor Grimes (Glen Emmets)
RCF	13	Ryan Burns (Hunterstown Rovers)
FF	14	Sam Mulroy (Naomh Máirtín) (c)
LCF	15	Kieran McArdle (St Bride's)
Substitutes:
	16	Ciarán Keenan (St Mary's) for McArdle
	17	Paul Matthews (St Fechin's) for Andy McDonnell
	18	Ciarán Byrne (St Mochta's) for Burns
	19	Dara McDonnell (Naomh Máirtín) for Duffy
	20	Emmet Carolan (Newtown Blues) for Nally
