= Lahiff =

Lahiff is a surname. Notable people with the surname include:

- Craig Lahiff (1947–2014), Australian film director
- Max Lahiff (born 1989), English rugby union footballer
- Tom Lahiff (born 1995), Irish Gaelic footballer
- Tommy Lahiff (1910–1996), Australian rules footballer
