= Tom Lahiff =

Tom Lahiff may refer to:

- Tommy Lahiff, Australian rules footballer
- Tom Lahiff (Gaelic footballer)
