= Niall McDonnell =

Niall McDonnell may refer to:

- Niall McDonnell (cricketer)
- Niall McDonnell (Gaelic footballer)
