= Ardee Community School =

- Pobalscoil Chillín Áth Fheirdia

Location
- Ardee; 53.85127°N 6.54615°W

Information
- Type: Community school
- Motto: Ná bris Sith: Ná bris Cáirdeas
- Established: 1974
- Principal: Mary Jackson

Ardee Community School, also known as St Killian's or ACS, is a community school located in Ardee, County Louth, Ireland. It is a co-educational school where pupils of all religious denominations study together. As is the case with all community schools, a board of management manages the school. The board is composed of two teacher representatives, two parent representatives, six nominees from the trustees and the principal, who is secretary to the board of management.

As of March 2025, the school had approximately 1200 students enrolled in its classes. An extension to the school was completed in 2017 delivering a 2-storey extension along with a new car park.

== History ==
Ardee Community School was established in 1974 and was the first community school outside the Greater Dublin area. The school was founded as an amalgamation of three schools which had previously existed independently: St Anne's Convent of Mercy, De La Salle Brothers' School and the Vocational School. A number of teachers who had previously worked in these schools continued their work in Ardee Community School.

== Curriculum ==
ACS offers a number of subjects. Leaving Cert students may study: Accounting, Art, Biology, Business, Chemistry, Construction Studies, Economics, English, Engineering, French, Geography, German, Home Economics, History, Health Education, Irish, Mathematics, Music, Physical Education, Religious Education and Technical Drawing.

The school has a number of Special Needs Assistants (SNAs) who provide assistance to students with additional needs.

== Sport ==
ACS students may participate in Gaelic football, soccer, rugby, golf, basketball and athletics.

=== Gaelic football ===
In Gaelic football, the school's senior team won the Lennon cup for the first time in 2012, defeating St Mary's of Drogheda on a scoreline of 4–11 to 0–7. The following year, Ardee made it back to the Lennon cup victorious once again, defeating The Marist of Dundalk in a replay. Ardee CS claimed the Lennon Cup again in 2017, edging out St Joseph's Secondary School on a scoreline of 0–13 to 1-09.

In 2014, the school's Senior Gaelic football team reached the All-Ireland 'C' final. They were defeated by Coláiste Ghobnatan of Cork on a scoreline of 1–12 to 2–6. Four years later, the Senior Gaelic team achieved success at a national level by beating St Declan's Community College from Waterford in Newbridge on Easter Saturday in 2018. They were crowned All-Ireland Schools 'C' Championship winners after beating St. Declan's CS by 1–9 to 0–3.

Dermot Campbell works with young players at the school.

== Notable alumni ==
- Mairead McGuinness - European Commissioner.
- Dr Peter Geraghty - former president, Royal Town Planning Institute.
- Ross Gaynor - former Republic of Ireland Under 21 footballer
- Sarah Bardon - political adviser for Minister for Further and Higher Education, Research, Innovation and Science, Simon Harris and former The Irish Times political reporter.
