= 2024 National Football League (Ireland) =

Gaelic football competition

League details
- Dates: 27 January – 31 March 2024
- Teams: 32

League champions
- Winners: Derry (7th win)
- Captain: Conor Glass
- Manager: Mickey Harte

League runners-up
- Runners-up: Dublin
- Captain: James McCarthy
- Manager: Dessie Farrell

Other division winners
- Division 2: Donegal
- Division 3: Westmeath
- Division 4: Laois

The 2024 National Football League, known for sponsorship reasons as the Allianz Football League, was the 93rd staging of the National Football League (NFL), an annual Gaelic football tournament for county teams. Thirty-one county teams from Ireland, plus London, compete; Kilkenny did not participate. 412,536 attended league matches during the 2024 season.

== Format ==
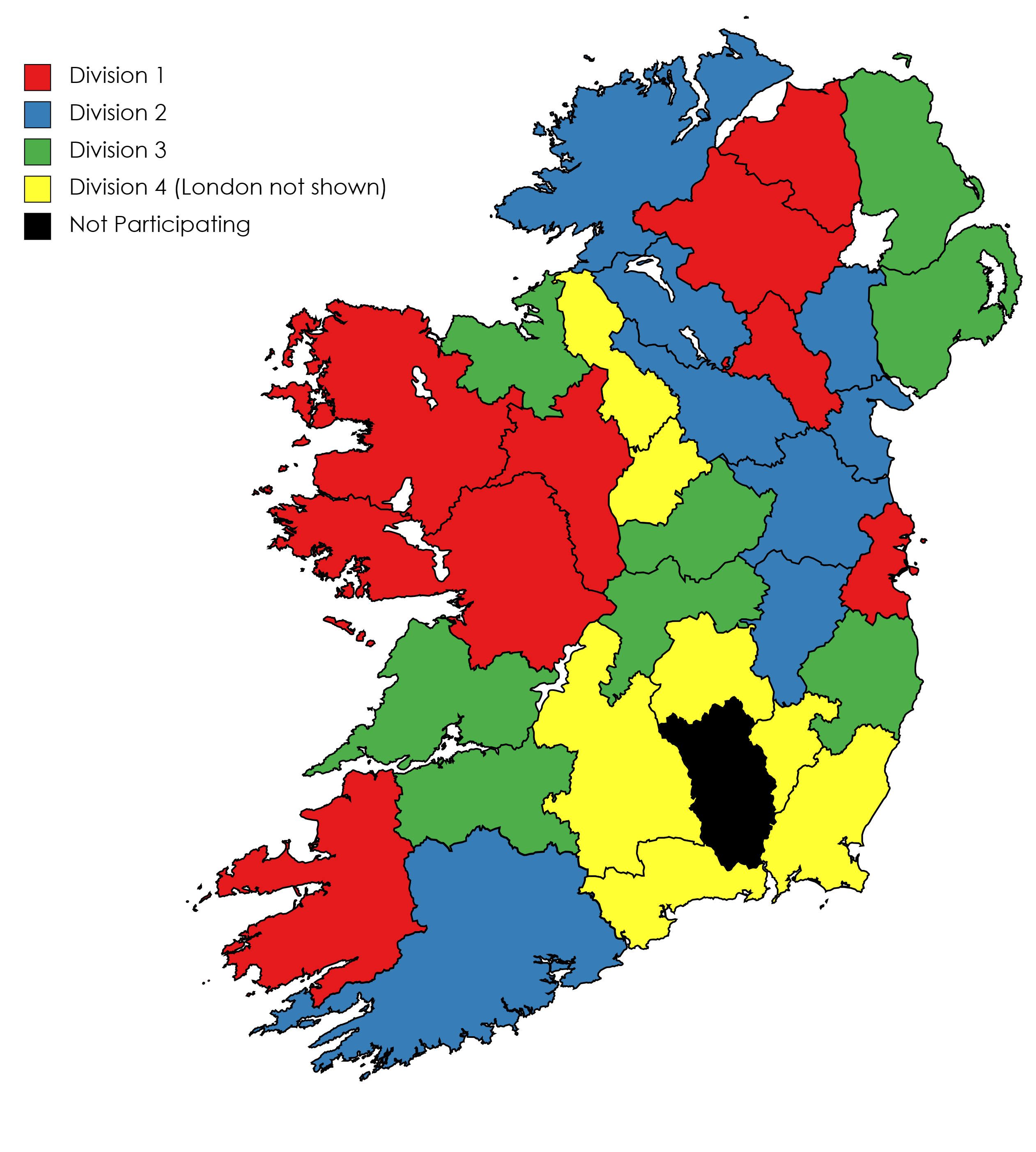
Map showing the leagues in which each county will participate.

=== League structure ===
Teams by Province and Division
Province	Division 1	Division 2	Division 3	Division 4	Total
Connacht	3	0	1	1	5
Leinster	1	3	3	4	11
Munster	1	1	2	2	6
Ulster	3	4	2	0	9
England	0	0	0	1	1
Total	8	8	8	8	32

In the top division, Division 1, teams compete to become the National Football League (NFL) champions. The top two teams qualify for the NFL Final, with the winners crowned NFL champions.

The 2024 National Football League consists of four divisions of eight teams. Each team plays every other team in its division once. Two points are awarded for a win, one point is awarded for a draw and none are awarded for a loss.

Teams compete for promotion and relegation to a higher or lower league. In Divisions 2, 3 and 4, the first and second-places teams are promoted, while the bottom two teams of divisions 1, 2 and 3 are relegated.

=== Tiebreakers for league ranking ===
As per the Official GAA Guide – Part 1 – Section 6.21 -

If two teams in the same group are equal on points on completion of the league phase, the following tie-breaking criteria are applied:

1. Where two teams only are involved – the outcome of the meeting of the two teams in the previous game in the Competition;

If three or more teams in the same group are equal on points on completion of the league phase, the following tie-breaking criteria are applied:

1. Scoring Difference (subtracting the total scores against from total scores for);
2. Highest Total Score For;
3. A Play-Off.

In the event that two teams or more finish with equal points, but have been affected by a disqualification, loss of game on a proven objection, retirement or walkover, the tie shall be decided by the following means:

1. Score Difference from the games in which only the teams involved, (teams tied on points), have played each other. (subtracting the total Scores Against from total Scores For)
2. Highest Total Score For, in which only the teams involved, have played each other, and have finished equal in (i)
3. A Play-Off

== Division 1 ==
Locations of the 2024 NFL Division 1 teams

=== Table ===
Pos	Team	Pld	W	D	L	PF	PA	PD	Pts	Qualification
1	Derry	7	6	0	1	138	100	+38	12	Advance to NFL Final
2	Dublin (Note: Dublin are ranked ahead of Kerry because they won the head-to-head game between the teams)	7	5	0	2	154	105	+49	10	Advance to NFL Final
3	Kerry	7	5	0	2	124	113	+11	10	
4	Mayo	7	4	0	3	115	108	+7	8	
5	Tyrone	7	3	0	4	104	126	−22	6	
6	Galway	7	2	1	4	94	109	−15	5	
7	Roscommon	7	1	1	5	92	115	−23	3	Relegation to 2025 NFL Division 2
8	Monaghan	7	1	0	6	103	148	−45	2	Relegation to 2025 NFL Division 2

Source: GAA.ie
Rules for classification: Tiebreakers

=== Matches ===
==== Round 1 ====
27 January 2024 Round 1	Kerry	2-08 (14) – (15) 0-15	Derry	Tralee
				Venue: Austin Stack Park
	Gls: Dylan Casey 1, Conor Geaney 1 Pts: Seán O’Shea 5 (4f), Graham O'Sullivan 1, Dara Moynihan 1, Dylan Geaney 1	Report	Pts: Shane McGuigan 7 (6f), Christopher McKaigue 1, Gareth McKinless 1, Conor Doherty 1, Conor Glass 1, Brendan Rogers 1, Declan Cassidy 1, Ciaran McFaul 1, Niall Toney1	Referee: Joe McQuillan (Cavan)

27 January 2024 Round 1	Dublin	1-14 (17) – (18) 3-09	Monaghan	Dublin
				Venue: Croke Park
	Gls: Cormac Costello 1 Pts: Cormac Costello 4 (4f), Ross McGarry 2 (1 m), David O'Hanlon 1 (1f), Eoin Murchan 1, Cian Murphy 1, Ciaran Kilkenny 1, Paddy Small 1, Luke Breathnach 1, Colm Basquel 1, Killian O'Gara 1	Report	Gls: Stephen O'Hanlon 1, Jack McCarron 1 (1 pen), Ciaran McNulty 1 Pts: Micheal Bannigan 3 (2f), Jack McCarron 2, Darren McDonnell 1, Stephen O'Hanlon 1, Ciaran McNulty 1, Andrew Woods 1	Referee: Paul Faloon (Down)

28 January 2024 Round 1	Galway	0-10 (10) – (18) 2-12	Mayo	Salthill
13:45 IST (UTC+1)				Venue: Pearse Stadium
	Pts: Shane Walsh 4 (2f), Liam Ó Conghaile 2, Cathak Sweeney 1, Dylan McHugh 1, Cillian Ó Curraoin 1, Matthew Tierney 1	Report	Gls: Eoghan McLaughlin 1, Cillian O'Connor 1 (1 pen); Pts: Fergal Boland 3, Ryan O'Donoghue 2 (2f), Paul Towey 2, Jordan Flynn 2, Paddy Durcan 1, Bob Tuohy 1, Jack Carney 1	Referee: Seán Hurson (Tyrone)

28 January 2024 Round 1	Tyrone	0-17 (17) – (14) 1-11	Roscommon	Omagh
13:45 IST (UTC+1)				Venue: Healy Park
	Pts: Darragh Canavan 8 (2f), Ciaran Daly 3, Niall Devlin 2, Michael McKernan 1, Pádraig Hampsey 1, Ben Cullen 1, Seanie O'Donnell 1 (1f)	Report	Gls: Donie Smith 1 Pts: Diarmuid Murtagh 5 (4f), Evan Flynn 1, Ciarán Lennon 1, Niall Daly 1, Cian Connelly 1, Keith Doyle 1, James Fitzpatrick	Referee: Martin McNally (Monaghan)

==== Round 2 ====
3 February 2024 Round 2	Mayo	1-12 (15) – (14) 0-14	Dublin	Castlebar
19:30 IST (UTC+1)				Venue: MacHale Park
	Gls: S Coen 1 Pts: R O’Donoghue 7 (6f), C Reape 1, J Carney 1, B Tuohy 1, F Boland 1, P Towey 1	Report	Pts: C Costello 4 (3f), C O’Callaghan 2, J McCaffrey 2, S Bugler 2, D O’Hanlon 1, C Murphy 1, B Fenton 1, P Small 1 (1f)	Referee: Fergal Kelly (Longford); Attendance: 14,789

4 February 2024 Round 2	Monaghan	1-12 (15) – (24) 3-15	Kerry	Clones
13:00 IST (UTC+1)				Venue: St Tiernach's Park
	Gls: Ryan O'Toole 1 Pts: Jack McCarron 3 (1 m), Stephen Mooney 2 (1 m), Kieran Duffy 1 (1 m), Gary Mohan 1, Ciarán McNulty 1, Stephen O’Hanlon 1, Michael Hamill 1, Jason Irwin 1, Mícheál McCarville 1	Report	Gls: Diarmuid O’Connor 1, Cillian Burke 1, David Clifford 1 Pts: Seán O’Shea 7 (2f), Tom O’Sullivan 2, Jason Foley 1, Dylan Casey 1, Conor Geaney 1, Dara Moynihan 1, David Clifford 1, Paudie Clifford 1	Referee: Seán Hurson (Tyrone)

4 February 2024 Round 2	Roscommon	0-09 (9) – (9) 0-09	Galway	Roscommon
14:00 IST (UTC+1)				Venue: Dr Hyde Park
	Pts: Conor Cox 5 (4f), Ruaidhrí Fallon 1, Daire Cregg 1, Ben O’Carroll 1, Diarmuid Murtagh 1 (1f)	Report	Pts: Cillian Ó Curraoin 3 (2f), Robert Finnerty 2 (2f), Matthew Tierney 2 (1f), Paul Conroy 1 (1f), Kieran Molloy 1	Referee: Conor Lane (Cork); Attendance: 6,128

4 February 2024 Round 2	Derry	1-12 (15) – (9) 0-09	Tyrone	Derry
15:45 IST (UTC+1)				Venue: Celtic Park
	Gls: Conor Glass 1 Pts: Shane McGuigan 3 (1f), Ethan Doherty 3, Cormac Murphy 3, Conor Doherty 1, Padraig Grogan 1, Niall Loughlin 1	Report	Pts: Seanie O'Donnell 2, Ciaran Daly 2, Niall Morgan 1, Brian Kennedy 1, Aodhan Donaghy 1, Darren McCurry 1 (1f), Darragh Canavan 1 (1f)	Referee: Noel Mooney (Cavan); Attendance: 11,629

==== Round 3 ====
17 February 2024 Round 3	Dublin	1-19 (22) – (15) 1-12	Roscommon	Dublin
17:00 IST (UTC+1)				Venue: Croke Park
	Gls: Niall Scully 1 Pts: David O'Hanlon 1f, Lee Gannon 1, John Small 1, Brian Fenton 2, Ross McGarry 3, Sean Bugler 1, Ciaran Kilkenny 2, Con O'Callaghan 7 (1f, 1 m), Lorcan O'Dell 1	Report	Gls: Enda Smith 1 Pts: Ruaidhri Fallon 1, Daire Cregg 4 (1 m, 1f), Enda Smith 2, James Fitzpatrick 1, Diarmuid Murtagh 3, Conor Cox 1	Referee: Seán Hurson (Tyrone)

17 February 2024 Round 3	Derry	3-17 (26) – (13) 0-13	Monaghan	Derry
17:00 IST (UTC+1)				Venue: Celtic Park
	Gls: Conor McCluskey 1, Conor Doherty 1, Padraig McGrogan 1 Pts: Ethan Doherty 1, Ciaran McFaul 2, Paul Cassidy 1, Shane McGuigan 11 (6fs), Niall Toner 2	Report	Pts: Darren McDonnell 1f, Joel Wilson 1, Michael Hamill 1, Jack McCarron 8 (4fs, 1 m), Andrew Woods 1, Dessie Ward 1

17 February 2024 Round 3	Kerry	0-16 (16) – (15) 0-15	Mayo	Tralee
19:30 IST (UTC+1)				Venue: Austin Stack Park
	Pts: Jason Foley 1, Diarmuid O’Connor 1, Paudie Clifford 4, Dylan Geaney 1, David Clifford 5, Seán O’Shea 4 (3f)	Report	Pts: Colm Reape 1f, Sam Callinan 2, Diarmuid O’Connor 1, Bob Tuohy 1, Fergal Bolan 3, Jordan Flynn 1, Ryan O’Donoghue 5 (2f), Darren McHale 1	Referee: David O’Mahoney (Tipperary)

18 February 2024 Round 3	Tyrone	0-12 (12) – (13) 1-10	Galway	Omagh
13:45 IST (UTC+1)				Venue: Healy Park
	Pts: N Morgan 2 (1f), C Devlin 1, M McKernan 1, P Harte 1, C Kilpatrick 1, D Canavan 3 (1f), C Daly 3 (1 m)	Report	Gls: C Sweeney 1 Pts: C Gleeson; J McGrath 1, P Conroy 1, J Heaney 2, M Tierney 1, R Finnerty 4 (1f, 1 m), D O’Flaherty 1	Referee: Joe McQuillan (Cavan)

==== Round 4 ====
24 February 2024 Round 4	Tyrone	1-15 (18) – (14) 1-11	Mayo	Omagh
17:15 IST (UTC+1)				Venue: Healy Park
	Gls: D Canavan 1 Pts: P Harte 2fs, D Canavan 4 (1f), S O’Donnell 1, D McCurry 8 (6fs)	Report	Gls: C O’Connor 1 (pen); Pts: R Hennelly 1f, R Brickenden 1, S Coen 1, F Boland 2, C O’Connor 2 (2fs), C McStay 1, R O’Donoghue 2, B Tuohy 1	Referee: Brendan Cawley (Kildare)

24 February 2024 Round 4	Dublin	3-18 (27) – (17) 1-14	Kerry	Dublin
19:30 IST (UTC+1)				Venue: Croke Park
	Gls: C O’Callaghan 3 (1 pen); Pts: L Gannon 1, B Fenton 1, R McGarry 1, S Bugler 3, C Kilkenny 3 (1 m), P Small 3, C O’Callaghan 4 (2f), N Scully 1, T Lahiff 1	Report	Gls: Joe O’Connor 1 Pts: Jason Foley 1, Gavin White 1, Joe O’Connor 1, Dylan Geaney 1, Cillian Burke 1, David Clifford 3 (1f), Seán O’Shea 6 (2f, 1 ‘45’)	Referee: Conor Lane (Cork); Attendance: 36,807

25 February 2024 Round 4	Roscommon	1-16 (19) – (7) 0-07	Monaghan	Roscommon
13:45 IST (UTC+1)				Venue: Dr Hyde Park
	Gls: Shane Cunnane 1 Pts: David Murray 1, Dylan Ruane 1, Enda Smith 3, Daire Cregg 5 (3f), Ruaidhrí Fallon 1, Donie Smith 1, Diarmuid Murtagh 4	Report	Pts: Kieran Duffy 1, Micheál McCarville 1, Ciarán McNulty 1, Stephen Mooney 1f, Jack McCarron 2f, Jason Irwin 1 (1 m)	Referee: Brendan Griffin (Kerry); Attendance: 5,672

25 February 2024 Round 4	Galway	1-11 (14) – (19) 3-10	Derry	Salthill
13:45 IST (UTC+1)				Venue: Pearse Stadium
	Gls: C Darcy 1 Pts: J Daly 1, K Molloy, D O’Flaherty 1, J Heaney 1f, R Finnerty 5 (4fs), N Daly 1, C Ó Curraoin 2 (1f)	Report	Gls: E McEvoy 1, Paul Cassidy 1, S McGuigan 1 (pen); Pts: C Glass 3 (1 m), B Rogers 1, C McFaul 1, Paul Cassidy 1f, N Loughlin 1, S McGuigan 2fs	Referee: Derek O’Mahoney (Tipperary)

==== Round 5 ====
2 March 2024 Round 5	Derry	1-11 (14) – (19) 1-16	Dublin	Derry
17:00 IST (UTC+1)				Venue: Celtic Park
	Gls: Conor McCluskey 1 Pts: Emmett Bradley 1, Lachlan Murray 1, Shane McGuigan 7 (3f), Eoin McEvoy 1, Paul Cassidy 1	Report	Gls: Cormac Costello 1 Pts: Lee Gannon 1, Brian Fenton 3, Ross McGarry 2, Sean Bugler 1, Ciaran Kilkenny 4, Paddy Small 1, Con O'Callaghan 3 (2f)	Referee: Martin McNally (Monaghan); Attendance: 13,265

2 March 2024 Round 5	Mayo	0-15 (15) – (9) 0-09	Roscommon	Castlebar
19:30 IST (UTC+1)				Venue: MacHale Park
	Pts: C Reape 1, D McHugh 2, S Coen 1, E Hession 1 m, F Boland 2, A O’Shea 1, R O’Donoghue 6 (3f), C O’Connor 1	Report	Pts: C Carroll 1f, D Murtagh 4 (1f), D Smith 1, C Cox 2 (1f)	Referee: Joe McQuillan (Cavan); Attendance: 9,610

3 March 2024 Round 5	Kerry	0-18 (18) – (14) 1-11	Tyrone	Killarney
13:15 IST (UTC+1)				Venue: Fitzgerald Stadium
	Pts: Sean O’Brien 1, Adrian Spillane 1, Paudie Clifford 3, David Clifford 8 (6f), Sean O’Shea 4 (1f), Dara Moynihan 1	Report	Gls: Ciarán Daly 1 Pts: Niall Morgan 1 (1 ’45), Ben Cullen 1, Conn Kilpatrick 1, Ciarán Daly 1, Darren McCurry 2 (1f), Darragh Canavan 3, Seanie O’Donnell 1, Ruairi Canavan 1	Referee: David Coldrick (Meath)

3 March 2024 Round 5	Monaghan	0-14 (14) – (21) 3-12	Galway	Clones
15:15 IST (UTC+1)				Venue: St Tiernach's Park
	Pts: Ryan O’Toole 1, Michael Hamill 2, Mícheál Bannigan 2 (1f, 1 m), Dessie Ward 2, Jack McCarron 4 (2f, 1 m), Conor McCarthy 2, Conor McManus 1f	Report	Gls: John Maher 1, Cathal Sweeney 1, Rory Cunningham 1 Pts: Seán Kelly 1, Rob Finnerty 2f, Rory Cunningham 3, Cillian Ó Curraoin 5 (4f, 1 m)	Referee: Barry Cassidy (Derry)

==== Round 6 ====
16 March 2024 Round 6	Galway	0-14 (14) – (22) 0-22	Dublin	Salthill
15:15 IST (UTC+1)				Venue: Pearse Stadium
	Pts: J McGrath 1, J Maher 1, C Sweeney 1, C Ó Curraoin 8 (5fs), R Cunningham 1, L Ó Conghaile 1, J McCabe 1	Report	Pts: E Comerford 1f, T Lahiff 2, K McGinnis 2, B Fenton 1, R McGarry 2, S Bugler 3, C Kilkenny 1, C O’Callaghan 9 (5fs, 1 m), C Basquel 1	Referee: Brendan Cawley (Kildare)

16 March 2024 Round 6	Tyrone	1-19 (22) – (19) 2-13	Monaghan	Omagh
19:30 IST (UTC+1)				Venue: Healy Park
	Gls: D Canavan 1 Pts: D Canavan 7 (3fs), D McCurry 7 (4fs, 1 m), B Cullen 1, A Donaghy 1, K McGeary 1, C McShane 1, J Oguz 1	Report	Gls: J McCarron 1, K Lavelle 1 Pts: C McCarthy 1, M Bannigan 1, C McManus 6 (1f, 1 m), J McCarron 4fs, C McNulty 1	Referee: Jerome Henry (Mayo)

17 March 2024 Round 6	Roscommon	1-11 (14) – (20) 1-17	Kerry	Roscommon
13:45 IST (UTC+1)				Venue: Dr Hyde Park
	Gls: C Heneghan 1 Pts: C Carroll 1, R Daly 2, E Smith 3, D Cregg 2, D Smith 3 (2fs)	Report	Gls: J O’Connor 1 Pts: Seán O’Brien 1, B D O’Sullivan 2, J O’Connor 1, P Clifford 1, D Moynihan 1, D Clifford 6 (1 pen), D Roche 1, S O’Shea 1, Stephen O’Brien 1, P Geaney 2	Referee: Noel Mooney (Cavan); Attendance: 6,464

17 March 2024 Round 6	Mayo	2-13 (19) – (24) 3-15	Derry	Castlebar
15:45 IST (UTC+1)				Venue: MacHale Park
	Gls: J Flynn 1, P Towey 1 Pts: C Reape 2 (1f, ‘45), A McDonnell 1, S Callinan 1, J Carney 1, F Boland 1, A O’Shea 2 (1f), T Conroy 1, R O’Donoghue 3 (2fs), P Towey 1	Report	Gls: C McCluskey 1, N Loughlin 1, S McGuigan 1 Pts: D Baker 1, G McKinless 1, P McGrogan 1, C Glass 1, E Doherty 1, C McFaul 1, S McGuigan 6 (3fs), N Toner 3	Referee: S Lonergan (Tipperary); Attendance: 9,373

==== Round 7 ====
24 March 2024 Round 7	Kerry	0-15 (15) – (13) 1-10	Galway	Killarney
13:45 IST (UTC+1)				Venue: Fitzgerald Stadium
	Pts: A Heinrich 1, J O’Connor 1, P Geaney 1, S O’Brien 1, K Spillane 4 (1f), D Roche 1, S O’Shea 4 (2f), P Clifford 1, D Clifford 1f	Report	Gls: T Culhane 1 Pts: D McHugh 1, John Daly 1, Paul Conroy 2, Johnny Heaney 2, C Sweeney 1, R Finnerty 2 m, C Ó Curraoin 1	Referee: Séamus Mulhare (Laois)

24 March 2024 Round 7	Monaghan	1-14 (17) – (19) 2-13	Mayo	Clones
13:45 IST (UTC+1)				Venue: St Tiernach's Park
	Gls: K Loughran 1 Pts: K O’Connell 1, G Mohan 1 m, C McNulty 1 m, M Bannigan 4 (2f), J Irwin 2, S Jones 2, D Garland 2 (1f, 1 m), B McBennett 1	Report	Gls: M Ruane 1, D McHale 1 Pts: P O’Hora 1, M Ruane 2, D McHale 1, A O’Shea 1f, Tommy Conroy 5f, C O’Connor 2 (1f, 1 m), Fergal Boland 1	Referee: Niall Cullen (Fermanagh)

24 March 2024 Round 7	Derry	2-19 (25) – (12) 1-09	Roscommon	Derry
13:45 IST (UTC+1)				Venue: Celtic Park
	Gls: L Murray 1, D Cassidy 1 Pts: L Murray 4, S McGuigan 4 (1f), C Glass 1, P Cassidy 2, E Doherty 4, N Toner 1, C McFaul 1, E McEvoy 1, Cormac Murphy 1	Report	Gls: D Smith 1 Pts: E Smith 2, D Murtagh 3 (2f), E McCormack 1, N Daly 1, D Cregg 1f, C Cox, 1	Referee: David Gough (Meath)

24 March 2024 Round 7	Dublin	5-18 (33) – (12) 0-12	Tyrone	Dublin
13:45 IST (UTC+1)				Venue: Croke Park
	Gls: C Murphy 1, N Scully 1, Lorcan O'Dell 1, C Basquel 2 Pts: S MacMahon 1, K McGinnis 3, L O'Dell 2, R McGarry 3, C O'Callaghan 4 (1 m, 1f), C Basquel 3 (1 m), P Mannion 2	Report	Pts: N Morgan 2 (1f), K McGeary 1, Lorcan McGarrity 1, D McCurry 2 (1f), R Canavan 4 (1f), C McShane 2	Referee: Barry Cassidy (Derry); Attendance: 17,450

=== Final ===
31 March 2024 Final	Dublin	2-21 (27) – (27) 3-18 (1–3 pen)	Derry	Dublin
16:00 IST (UTC+1)		(HT: 1-7 – 0-10) (FT: 1-18 – 2-15)		Venue: Croke Park
	Gls: Colm Basquel 1, Greg McEneaney 1 Pts: Con O’Callaghan 5 (5f), Cian Murphy 2, Tom Lahiff 2, Ross McGarry 2, Killian O’Gara 2, Seán MacMahon 1, Brian Howard 1, Killian McGinnis 1, Seán Bugler 1, Niall Scully 1, Colm Basquel 1, Paul Mannion 1, Paddy Small 1	Report	Gls: Eoin McEvoy 2, Shane McGuigan 1 (1 pen); Pts: Shane McGuigan 4 (2f), Lachlan Murray 3 (1 m), Eoin McEvoy 2, Conor Glass 2 (1 '45'), Niall Loughlin 2, Niall Toner 2, Conor Doherty 1, Brendan Rogers 1, Ethan Doherty 1	Referee: Conor Lane (Cork); Attendance: 33,121; TV: TG4
		Penalty shootout
	C O'Callaghan; P Mannion; L O'Dell; T Lahiff		S McGuigan; C Glass; E Doherty

== Division 2 ==
=== Table ===
Pos	Team	Pld	W	D	L	PF	PA	PD	Pts	Qualification
1	Donegal	7	6	1	0	128	83	+45	13	Advance to NFL Division 2 Final and promotion to 2025 NFL Division 1
2	Armagh	7	5	2	0	132	86	+46	12	Advance to NFL Division 2 Final and promotion to 2025 NFL Division 1
3	Cavan (Note: Cavan are ranked ahead of Cork because they won the head-to-head game between the teams)	7	3	1	3	103	117	−14	7	
4	Cork	7	3	1	3	119	125	−6	7	
5	Meath (Note: Meath are ranked ahead of Louth because they won the head-to-head game between the teams)	7	2	2	3	86	105	−19	6	
6	Louth	7	3	0	4	121	101	+20	6	
7	Fermanagh	7	2	1	4	94	129	−35	5	Relegation to 2025 NFL Division 3
8	Kildare	7	0	0	7	82	119	−37	0	Relegation to 2025 NFL Division 3

Source: GAA.ie
Rules for classification: Tiebreakers

=== Matches ===
==== Round 1 ====
27 January 2024 Round 1	Meath	0-12 (12) – (12) 1-09	Fermanagh	Navan
				Venue: Páirc Tailteann
	Pts: A O’Neill 1, R Jones 1, D McGowan 3 (1 '45), E Frayne 5 (1f), M Costello 1f, S Walsh 1	Report	Gls: S Cassidy 1 Pts: L Cullen 1, O Smyth 1, S McGullion 1, U Kelm 1, G Jones 2, S Cassidy 2, A Breen 1	Referee: Jerome Henry (Mayo)

27 January 2024 Round 1	Kildare	0-12 (12) – (16) 0-16	Cavan	Carlow
				Venue: Dr Cullen Park
	Pts: Kevin Flynn 1, Jack Sargent 1, Ben McCormack 1, Paddy Woodgate 1, Darragh Kirwan 3, Jimmy Hyland 2, Shane O’Sullivan 2, Aaron O’Neill 1	Report	Pts: Padraig Faulkner 1, Oisin Kiernan 1, Killian Clarke 1, Ciaran Brady 1, Dara McVeety 1, Gerard Smith 1, Paddy Lynch 8, Oisin Brady 1, Cormac O’Reilly 1	Referee: Barry Tiernan (Dublin)

27 January 2024 Round 1	Armagh	0-12 (12) – (11) 0-11	Louth	Armagh
				Venue: Athletic Grounds
	Pts: Aidan Forker 1, Rory Grugan 2 (1f), Stefan Campbell 3, Conor Turbitt 5 (4f), Oisín Conaty 1	Report	Pts: Dermot Campbell 1, Tommy Durnin 1, Paul Mathews 1, Ciaran Keenan 1, Conor Grimes 1, Ryan Burns 1, Sam Mulroy 3f, Ciaran Downey 2	Referee: Thomas Murphy (Galway); Attendance: 10,452

28 January 2024 Round 1	Donegal	1-20 (23) – (12) 2-06	Cork	Ballybofey
				Venue: MacCumhaill Park
	Gls: Patrick McBrearty 1 Pts: Gavin Mulreany 1f, Brendan McCole 1, Ryan McHugh 1, Donal Mac Giolla Bhríde 1, Peadar Mogan 1, Caolan McGonagle 1, Ciarán Thompson 1, Odhrán Doherty 3, Shane O'Donnell 1, Daire Ó Baoill 2, Patrick McBrearty 6 (6f), Jamie Brennan 1	Report	Gls: Eoghan McSweeney 1, Chris Óg Jones 1 Pts: Brian O'Driscoll 2, Chris Óg Jones 2, Steven Sherlock 1f, Mark Cronin 1	Referee: Noel Mooney (Cavan); Attendance: 5,012

==== Round 2 ====
3 February 2024 Round 2	Armagh	2-16 (22) – (10) 0-10	Meath	Armagh
18:00 IST (UTC+1)				Venue: Athletic Grounds
	Gls: O McConville 1, Ciaran Mackin 1 Pts: C Turbitt 5 (5f), O McConville 1, R Grugan 3 (1f), O Conaty 2, O O'Neill 2 (1f), J Óg Burns 1, C O’Neill 1, P Burns 1	Report	Pts: E Frayne 4 (1f), M Costello 2 (2f), C McBride 1 m, J O’Connor 1, D Moriarty 1, A Lynch 1	Referee: Brendan Cawley (Kildare); Attendance: 9,033

3 February 2024 Round 2	Fermanagh	2-10 (16) – (12) 0-12	Kildare	Enniskillen
18:00 IST (UTC+1)				Venue: Brewster Park
	Gls: Declan McCusker 1, Sean Cassidy 1 Pts: Lee Cullen 1, Che Cullen 1, Declan McCusker 1, Josh Largo Ellis 1, Ronan McCafffrey 1, Ultan Kelm 21f, Garvan Jones 2f, Sean Cassidy 1	Report	Pts: Mark Donnellan 2f, Mick O'Grady 1, Kevin O’Callaghan 1, Ben McCormack 2, Paddy Woodgate 2, Jimmy Hyland 4f	Referee: Seamus Mulhare (Laois)

4 February 2024 Round 2	Louth	2-09 (15) – (13) 0-13	Cork	Ardee
13:00 IST (UTC+1)				Venue: Páirc Mhuire
	Gls: Ciarán Keenan 1, Ciarán Downey 1 Pts: Craig Lennon 2, Paul Mathews 1, Ryan Burns 1, Sam Mulroy 5 (4f, 1 '45)	Report	Pts: Patrick Doyle 1 (1 '45), Tommy Walsh 1, Ian Maguire 1, Colm O’Callaghan 1, Eoghan McSweeney 2, Chris Óg Jones 2, Brian Hurley 4 (3f), Mark Cronin 1 (1f)	Referee: Martin McNally (Monaghan)

4 February 2024 Round 2	Cavan	0-12 (12) – (13) 0-13	Donegal	Cavan
16:00 IST (UTC+1)				Venue: Breffni Park
	Pts: James Smith 2 (1 m), Padraig Faulkner 1, Ciaran Brady 1, Dara McVeety 1, Paddy Lynch 5f, Caoimhin O’Reilly 2 (1f)	Report	Pts: Ciarán Thompson 1, Patrick McBrearty 4 (3f), Oisín Gallen 6 (4f), Jamie Brennan 1, Jeaic Mac Ceallabhuí 1	Referee: Sean Lonergan (Tipperary)

==== Round 3 ====
17 February 2024 Round 3	Donegal	2-16 (22) – (8) 0-08	Fermanagh	Letterkenny
14:00 IST (UTC+1)				Venue: O'Donnell Park
	Gls: Dáire Ó Baoill 2, Pts: Dáire Ó Baoill 3, Peadar Mogan 1, Michael Langan 1, Patrick McBrearty 3 (1f), Oisín Gallen 3 (2fs), Mark Curran 1, Aaron Doherty 2, Jeaic Mac Ceallabhuí 2	Report	Pts: Declan McCusker 1, Brandon Horan 1, Conor McGee 1, Sean Cassidy 3 (1f), Diarmuid King 1, Tiarnan Bogue 1	Referee: Fergal Kelly (Longford)

17 February 2024 Round 3	Cork	0-16 (16) – (17) 0-17	Cavan	Cork
14:00 IST (UTC+1)				Venue: Páirc Uí Chaoimh
	Pts: M Taylor 1, C O’Callaghan 1, B O’Driscoll 1, M Cronin 4 (2 '45s, 1f), B Hurley 3 (2f), C Óg Jones 3	Report	Pts: C Brady 1, G Smith 1, P Lynch 9 (6f), Caoimhín O’Reilly 2	Referee: Brendan Griffin (Kerry); Attendance: 3,533

18 February 2024 Round 3	Meath	1-11 (14) – (12) 1-09	Louth	Navan
14:00 IST (UTC+1)				Venue: Páirc Tailteann
	Gls: Matthew Costello 1 Pts: Daithi McGowan 2 (1 m), Eoghan Frayne 2, Jack O’Connor 2, Matthew Costello 2 (2f), Shane Walsh 3	Report	Gls: Tom Jackson 1 Pts: Tommy Durnin 1, Ciaran Keenan 1, Ryan Burns 4, Sam Mulroy 3 (2f, 1 m)	Referee: Liam Devenney (Mayo)

18 February 2024 Round 3	Kildare	0-08 (8) – (22) 2-16	Armagh	Carlow
15:45 IST (UTC+1)				Venue: Dr Cullen Park
	Pts: K Feely 4 (3f), A Beirne 1, D Kirwan 1, N Kelly 1, K Flynn 1	Report	Gls: C Turbitt 1, R Grugan 1 Pts: C Turbitt 5 (3f, 1 m), O Conaty 4, R Grugan 1f, S Campbell 3, J McElroy 1, Connaire Mackin 1, J Óg Burns 1	Referee: David Coldrick (Meath)

==== Round 4 ====
25 February 2024 Round 4	Meath	0-12 (12) – (9) 0-09	Kildare	Navan
14:00 IST (UTC+1)				Venue: Páirc Tailteann
	Pts: Eoghan Frayne 3 (1f, 1 m), Sean Brennan 2 (1f, 1 '45), Mathew Costello 2fs, Ronan Jones 1, Darragh Campion 1, Cathal Hickey 1, Ruairi Kinsella 1, Aaron Lynch 1.	Report	Pts: Ben McCormack 3, Kevin Feely 2fs, Mark Donnellan 1f, Alex Beirne 1, Niall Kelly 1, Eoin Doyle 1	Referee: Seamus Mulhare (Laois)

25 February 2024 Round 4	Louth	3-09 (18) – (19) 2-13	Cavan	Ardee
14:00 IST (UTC+1)				Venue: Páirc Mhuire
	Gls: Ryan Burns 1, Sam Mulroy 2 (1 pen); Pts: Tommy Durnin 1, Ciarán Keenan 2, Conor Grimes 2, Sam Mulroy 2fs, Ciarán Downey 1, Tom Jackson 1	Report	Gls: James Smith 1, Gerard Smith 1 Pts: Cian Madden 2, Caoimhín O’Reilly 2 (1 m), Paddy Lynch 8 (6fs, 1 ’45), Cormac O’Reilly 1	Referee: Niall Cullen (Fermanagh)

25 February 2024 Round 4	Fermanagh	0-16 (16) – (17) 1-14	Cork	Ederney
14:00 IST (UTC+1)				Venue: St Joseph's Park
	Pts: Sean McNally 1f, Declan McCusker 3 (1f), Shane McGullion 2, Ultan Kelm 1, Garvan Jones 7 (4f), Sean Cassidy 2	Report	Gls: Maurice Shanley 1 Pts: Matty Taylor 1, Ian Maguire 1, Conor Corbett 1, Brian O’Driscoll 1, Brian Hurley 9 (7f), Chris Óg Jones 1	Referee: Anthony Nolan (Wicklow)

25 February 2024 Round 4	Armagh	1-09 (12) – (12) 0-12	Donegal	Armagh
15:00 IST (UTC+1)				Venue: Athletic Grounds
	Gls: Andrew Murnin 1 Pts: Andrew Murnin 1, Conor O'Neill 2, Rory Grugan 2, Aidan Forker 1, Oisín Conaty 1, Jarly Óg Burns 1, Rian O’Neill 1	Report	Pts: Paddy McBreaty 4 (2fs), Oisín Gallen 4 (2fs, 2 m), Ciarán Thompson 1, Michael Langan 1, Peadar Mogan 1, Shane O’Donnell 1	Referee: Noel Mooney (Cavan); Attendance: 11,252

==== Round 5 ====
2 March 2024 Round 5	Cavan	0-11 (11) – (11) 0-11	Meath	Cavan
19:00 IST (UTC+1)				Venue: Breffni Park
	Pts: Niall Carolan 1, Padraig Faulkner 1, Cian Madden 1, Paddy Lynch 6 (5fs), James Smith 2	Report	Pts: Sean Brennan 3 (3 '45), Daithi McGowan 2, Ronan Jones 1, Eoghan Frayne 1f, Jack O'Connor 1, Mathew Costello 2, Shane Walsh 1	Referee: James Molloy (Galway)

3 March 2024 Round 5	Fermanagh	0-11 (11) – (15) 0-15	Armagh	Enniskillen
18:00 IST (UTC+1)				Venue: Brewster Park
	Pts: D McCusker 2, J McMahon 1, J McDade 1 m, C McGee 1, C McShea 1, G Jones 2 (1 m), U Kelm 1f, S Cassidy 1f, C Jones 1	Report	Pts: B Hughes 2 (2 '45), P McGrane 1, S Campbell 3, A Murnin 3 (1 m), R Grugan 2, C McConville 1, C Turbitt 3 (1f)	Referee: Paul Faloon (Down)

3 March 2024 Round 5	Donegal	1-17 (20) – (15) 0-15	Louth	Ballyshannon
14:00 IST (UTC+1)				Venue: Fr Tierney Park
	Gls: Jeaic Mac Ceallabhuí 1 Pts: Caolan McGonagle 1, Michael Langan 1, Shane O’Donnell 2, Patrick McBrearty 8 (7f), Oisín Gallen 4, Aaron Doherty 1	Report	Pts: Donal McKenny 1, Ciaran Keenan 1, Conor Grimes 2, Ryan Burns 2, Sam Mulroy 7 (5f, 1 m), Liam Jackson 1	Referee: Paddy Neilan (Roscommon)

3 March 2024 Round 5	Cork	2-15 (21) – (18) 3-09	Kildare	Cork
15:30 IST (UTC+1)				Venue: Páirc Uí Chaoimh
	Gls: C Corbett 1, T Walsh 1 Pts: K Flahive 1, R Maguire 1, C O’Callaghan 3, B O’Driscoll 3, C Óg Jones 3, C Corbett 2, B Hurley 2	Report	Gls: A Beirne 1, K Feely 1 (pen), D Flynn 1 Pts: K Feely 6 (3f), D Flynn 1, N Kelly 2 (1f)	Referee: David Gough (Meath)

==== Round 6 ====
16 March 2024 Round 6	Armagh	2-21 (27) – (12) 0-12	Cavan	Armagh
17:00 IST (UTC+1)				Venue: Athletic Grounds
	Gls: P McGrane 1, C Turbitt 1 (pen); Pts: G McCabe 2, B Crealey 1, S Campbell 1, R Grugan 5 (3fs), C Turbitt 4 (1 m, 1f), A Murnin 2, O Conaty 4, R McQuillan 1, R O’Neill 1	Report	Pts: D McVeety 2, T Madden 1, R O’Neill 3, P Lynch 5f, R Donohoe 1	Referee: Liam Devenney (Mayo)

16 March 2024 Round 6	Kildare	1-08 (11) – (17) 0-17	Donegal	Carlow
17:00 IST (UTC+1)				Venue: Dr Cullen Park
	Gls: A Beirne 1 Pts: A Beirne 3, K Feely 4 (2fs, 2 m), S Farrell 1	Report	Pts: P Mogan 5, M Langan 3, C Thompson 2, D O’Baoill 2, P McBrearty 1, O Gallen 1 m, C McGonagle 1, A Doherty 1, O Doherty 1	Referee: Paul Faloon (Down)

16 March 2024 Round 6	Louth	6-17 (35) – (11) 0-11	Fermanagh	Ardee
13:00 IST (UTC+1)				Venue: Páirc Mhuire
	Gls: P Lynch 1, C Downey 1, C Grimes 1, S Mulroy 2, T Jackson 1 Pts: D Campbell 1, P Lynch 1, C Downey 3, T Durnin 1, C Keenan 3, C Grimes 2, R Burns 1, S Mulroy 5 (2fs)	Report	Pts: D McCusker 1, S McGullion 1, U Kelm 1, G Jones 3fs, S Cassidy 3 (1f), F O’Brien 1, D King 1	Referee: Seán Hurson (Tyrone)

16 March 2024 Round 6	Meath	1-11 (14) – (18) 1-15	Cork	Navan
13:45 IST (UTC+1)				Venue: Páirc Tailteann
	Gls: M Costello 1 Pts: S Brennan 3 (3 '45), M Costello 2 (1f), R Kinsella 2, S Walsh 1, E Frayne 3 (1f)	Report	Gls: M Taylor 1, C Corbett 1 Pts: L Fahy 2, Matty Taylor 1, S Powter 1, B O'Driscoll 1, C Og Jones 1, C Corbett 3, B Hurley 2, S Sherlock 3 (1f), Mark Cronin 1	Referee: Thomas Murphy (Galway)

==== Round 7 ====
23 March 2024 Round 7	Kildare	0-12 (12) – (15) 1-12	Louth	Carlow
19:00 IST (UTC+1)				Venue: Dr Cullen Park
	Pts: P Woodgate 5 (3fs, 1 '45), A Masterson 3, K Feely 2fs, D Kirwan 1, P McDermott 1, D Flynn 1	Report	Gls: R Burns 1 Pts: S Mulroy 5 (4fs, 1 '45), R Burns 2, T Jackson 2, C Grimes 1, L Grey 1, C Downey 1	Referee: Joe McQuillan (Cavan)

23 March 2024 Round 7	Donegal	1-18 (21) – (13) 1-10	Meath	Ballybofey
19:00 IST (UTC+1)				Venue: MacCumhaill Park
	Gls: J Brennan 1 Pts: R McHugh 2, H McFadden 1, C Thompson 3 (2f), A Doherty 2, S O'Donnell 2, J Brennan 1, O Gallen 4, J Mac Ceallabhuí 1, N O'Donnell 1, L McGlynn 1	Report	Gls: C Hickey 1 Pts: D Keogan 1, R Jones 1, R Kinsella 1, S Walsh 1, J Conlan 2, K Curtis 2, D Dixon 1, A Lynch 1f	Referee: Paddy Neilan (Roscommon)

23 March 2024 Round 7	Cork	2-16 (22) – (22) 2-16	Armagh	Cork
19:00 IST (UTC+1)				Venue: Páirc Uí Chaoimh
	Gls: L Fahy 1, C Óg Jones 1 Pts: M Shanley 1, M Taylor 1, I Maguire 1, C O’Callaghan 3, P Walsh 1 m, B O’Driscoll 1, C Óg Jones 3, C Corbett 1, B Hurley 4 (3f)	Report	Gls: P McGrane 1, R Grugan 1 Pts: B Crealey 2 (1 m), R Grugan 3f, C Turbitt 5 (2f), O Conaty 4, J Óg Burns 1, A Nugent 1	Referee: Brendan Griffin (Kerry)

23 March 2024 Round 7	Cavan	1-13 (16) – (20) 2-14	Fermanagh	Cavan
19:00 IST (UTC+1)				Venue: Breffni Park
	Gls: P Lynch 1 Pts: C Rehill 1, J Smith 2, P Lynch 7 (5fs, 1 m, 1 '45), C O’Reilly 1, C Madden 2 (1 m)	Report	Gls: G Jones 1, S Cassidy 1 Pts: D McCusker 2, F O’Brien 2, R McCaffrey 1, G Jones 8 (1f), S Cassidy 1f	Referee: Kieran Eannetta (Tyrone)

=== Final ===
31 March 2024 Final	Armagh	0-14 (14) – (15) 0-15	Donegal	Dublin
13:45 IST (UTC+1)				Venue: Croke Park
	Pts: Rory Grugan 4 (2f), Conor Turbitt 4 (2f), Jarly Óg Burns 2, Oisín Conaty 2, Stefan Campbell 1, Oisín O'Neill 1	Report	Pts: Oisín Gallen 5 (2f), Ciarán Thompson 3, Niall O'Donnell 3, Shane O'Donnell 1, Caolan McGonagle 1, Peadar Mogan 1, Aaron Doherty 1	Referee: Paul Faloon (Down); TV: TG4, eir Sport

== Division 3 ==
=== Table ===
Pos	Team	Pld	W	D	L	PF	PA	PD	Pts	Qualification
1	Down	7	6	1	0	145	88	+57	13	Advance to NFL Division 3 Final and promotion to 2025 NFL Division 2
2	Westmeath	7	5	1	1	95	83	+12	11	Advance to NFL Division 3 Final and promotion to 2025 NFL Division 2
3	Clare	7	5	0	2	106	95	+11	10	
4	Sligo	7	4	1	2	103	96	+7	9	
5	Antrim	7	3	0	4	94	106	−12	6	
6	Offaly	7	2	1	4	111	100	+11	5	
7	Wicklow	7	1	0	6	78	126	−48	2	Relegation to 2025 NFL Division 4
8	Limerick	7	0	0	7	77	115	−38	0	Relegation to 2025 NFL Division 4

Source: GAA.ie
Rules for classification: Tiebreakers

=== Matches ===
==== Round 1 ====
28 January 2024 Round 1	Limerick	2-07 (13) – (20) 2-14	Antrim	Rathkeale
				Venue: Mick Neville Park
	Gls: T Childs 1, I Corbett 1 (pen); Pts: A O'Sullivan 1 (‘45), B Childs 1, P Maher; T Childs 1, I Corbett 2, C Fahy 1, P Nash 1	Report	Gls: R McCann 1, D McEnhill 1 (pen); Pts: M Byrne 2f, R Boyle 1, D McAleese 1, E Hynds 1, R McCann 2, N Byrnes 1, D McEnhill 6 (4f)	Referee: S Lonergan (Tipperary)

28 January 2024 Round 1	Wicklow	0-13 (13) – (18) 0-18	Down	Aughrim
				Venue: Aughrim County Ground
	Pts: Chris O’Brien 5 (4f), JP Nolan 1f, Brian Nesbitt 3 (2f), Kevin Quinn 4 (1 m, 2f)	Report	Pts: Pierce Laverty 1, Finn McElroy 1, Daniel Guinneas 4, Odhran Murdock 1, Liam Kerr 3 (1 m, 1f), Pat Havern 5, Oisin Savage 1, Rory Mason 2 (1f)	Referee: Alan Coyne (Westmeath)

28 January 2024 Round 1	Offaly	0-10 (10) – (14) 1-11	Westmeath	Tullamore
				Venue: O'Connor Park
	Gls: Senan Baker, 1 Pts: Conor Dillon 1, James Dolan 1, Ray Connellan 1, Sam McCartan 1, Ronan O'Toole 2, Luke Loughlin 3, Senan Baker, 2f	Report	Pts: Jordan Hayes 1, Cian Farrell 5 (4f), Anton Sullivan 2, Nigel Dunne 2 (1 m)	Referee: Seamus Mulhare (Laois)

28 January 2024 Round 1	Clare	0-09 (9) – (8) 1-05	Sligo	Ennis
				Venue: Cusack Park
	Pts: Emmet McMahon 5 (4f), Dermot Coughlan 1, Mark McInerney 1f, Aaron Griffin 2	Report	Gls: Sean Carrabine 1 Pts: Jack Lavin 1, Patrick O’Connor 1, Pat Spillane 1, Sean Carrabine 1f, Niall Murphy 1f	Referee: Conor Lane (Cork); Attendance: 1,587

==== Round 2 ====
3 February 2024 Round 2	Down	3-16 (25) – (9) 0-09	Limerick	Newry
18:00 IST (UTC+1)				Venue: Páirc Esler
	Gls: Daniel Guinness 1, Odhran Murdock 2 (2 pens); Pts: Peter Fegan 1, Daniel Guinness 1, Odhran Murdock 3, Liam Kerr 3 (1f), Shealan Johnston 2, Pat Havern 5f, Oisin Savage 1	Report	Pts: Robbie Childs 1, Cillian Fahy 2, Peter Nash 5 (4f), Shane Costello 1	Referee: Jerome Henry (Mayo)

4 February 2024 Round 2	Sligo	2-10 (16) – (14) 1-11	Wicklow	Sligo
13:00 IST (UTC+1)				Venue: Markievicz Park
	Gls: Alan McLoughlin 1, Niall Murphy 1 Pts: Aidan Devaney 1f, Patrick O’Connor 1, Alan McLoughlin 1, Eoghan Smith 1, Cian Lally 1, Sean Carrabine 3 (1f), Niall Murphy 2f	Report	Gls: Patrick O’Keane 1 Pts: Dean Healy 2, Oisin McGraynor 1f, Brian Nesbitt 1, Kevin Quinn 6 (3f), Gearoid Murphy 1	Referee: Kieran Eannetta (Tyrone)

4 February 2024 Round 2	Antrim	2-05 (11) – (10) 1-07	Offaly	Belfast
14:00 IST (UTC+1)				Venue: Corrigan Park
	Gls: Ronan Boyle 1, Dominic McEnhill (1 pen); Pts: Michael Byrne 1f, Marc Jordan 1, Eoin Hynds 1, Niall Burns 2 (1f)	Report	Gls: Anton Sullivan 1 Pts: Jordan Hayes 1, Ruairi McNamee 2, Cian Farrell 2 (1f), Nigel Dunne 2	Referee: Paul Faloon (Down)

4 February 2024 Round 2	Westmeath	1-11 (14) – (13) 0-13	Clare	Mullingar
14:00 IST (UTC+1)				Venue: Cusack Park
	Gls: C Dillon 1 Pts: S McCartan 2, RWallace 1, R Connellan 1, R O'Toole 3, L Loughlin 2f, K Martin 1, R Forde 1f	Report	Pts: S Ryan 1, A Sweeney 1, D Walsh 1, B McNamara 1, D Coughlan 3, E McMahon 2f, C Downes 3 (1 '45'), A Griffin 1	Referee: D Murnane (Cork)

==== Round 3 ====
18 February 2024 Round 3	Wicklow	0-10 (10) – (16) 1-13	Westmeath	Aughrim
14:00 IST (UTC+1)				Venue: Aughrim County Ground
	Pts: Eoin Murtagh 1, Kevin Quinn 8 (7f), JP Nolan 1	Report	Gls: Kieran Martin 1 Pts: Ronan Wallace 1, Ronan O’Toole 1, Danny McCartan 3, Senan Barker 6 (5f), Kieran Martin 1f	Referee: Conor Dourneen (Cavan)

18 February 2024 Round 3	Offaly	1-12 (15) – (16) 2-10	Clare	Tullamore
14:00 IST (UTC+1)				Venue: O'Connor Park
	Gls: Anton Sullivan 1 Pts: Cormac Egan 1, Peter Cunningham 1 (pen), Ruari McNamee 2, Jordan Hayes 1, Dylan Hyland 3 (2f), Nigel Dunne 4 (2f, 1 '45').	Report	Gls: Ciaran Downes 1 (pen), Diarmuid O'Donnell 1 Pts: Daniel Walsh 1, Emmet McMahon 3f, Mark McInerney 1, Aaron Griffin 1, Shane Griffin 1, Cormac Murray 1, Diarmuid O'Donnell 2	Referee: James Molloy (Galway)

18 February 2024 Round 3	Limerick	0-10 (10) – (15) 1-12	Sligo	Rathkeale
14:00 IST (UTC+1)				Venue: Mick Neville Park
	Pts: B Coleman 1, I Corbett, T Childs 2, C McSweeney 1, P Nash 4 (3f), E Hurley 2 (1f)	Report	Gls: P McNamara 1 Pts: A Devaney 1 (’45), P O’Connor 2, A McLaughlin 1, P Spillane 2, S Carribine 3 (2f), N Murphy 3 (2f)	Referee: C Maguire (Clare)

18 February 2024 Round 3	Antrim	1-06 (9) – (18) 1-15	Down	Belfast
14:00 IST (UTC+1)				Venue: Corrigan Park
	Gls: Paddy McAleer 1 Pts: Michael Byrne 2f, Joseph Finnegan 1, Dominic McEnhill 3 (2f).	Report	Gls: Ceilum Doherty 1 Pts: John O'Hare 1 (45), Ceilum Doherty 1, Odhran Murdock 1, Pat Havern 6 (4f), James Guinness 2, Liam Kerr 1, Oisin Savage 2, Danny Magill 1	Referee: Enda McFeely (Donegal)

==== Round 4 ====
24 February 2024 Round 4	Down	4-12 (24) – (20) 2-14	Offaly	Newry
18:00 IST (UTC+1)				Venue: Páirc Esler
	Gls: Odhran Murdock 1, Liam Kerr 2, Ryan Johnston 1 Pts: Miceal Rooney 1, Odhran Murdock 1, Caolan Mooney 1, Danny Magill 1, Pat Havern 6 (5f), Ryan Johnston 1, Ryan Magill 1	Report	Gls: Keith O’Neill 1, Jack Bryant 1 Pts: Jordan Hayes 1, Dylan Hyland 2 (1f), Keith O’Neill 2, Jack Bryant 5f, Anton Sullivan 3 (1f), Cathal Flynn 1	Referee: https://www.rte.ie/sport/football/2024/0224/1434167-kerr-double-helps-lead-down-past-offaly-in-goalfest/

25 February 2024 Round 4	Clare	2-15 (21) – (8) 0-08	Wicklow	Ennis
13:00 IST (UTC+1)				Venue: Cusack Park
	Gls: Cormac Murray 2 Pts: Ronan Lanigan 1, Brian McNamara 2, Ciaran Downes 3 (1f), Emmet McMahon 4f, Cormac Murray 1 m, Aaron Griffin 3, Diarmuid O’Donnell 1f	Report	Pts: Gearoid Murphy 2, John Paul Nolan 1f, Christopher O’Brien 1, Kevin Quinn 1f, Eoin Darcy 1	Referee: Jonathan Hayes (Limerick)

25 February 2024 Round 4	Westmeath	0-14 (14) – (11) 1-08	Limerick	Mullingar
14:00 IST (UTC+1)				Venue: Cusack Park
	Pts: S McCartan 1, RWallace 2, N Harte 1, R Connellan 1, R O'Toole 3, S Baker 1f, D McCartan 2 (1f), K Martin 3	Report	Gls: C Downes 1 Pts: A O'Sullivan 1 ('45'), J Liston 1, I Corbett 1, J Naughton 2 (1f), C Downes 2, P Nash 1f	Referee: J Gilmartin (Sligo)

25 February 2024 Round 4	Sligo	1-20 (23) – (16) 1-13	Antrim	Sligo
14:00 IST (UTC+1)				Venue: Markievicz Park
	Gls: Cian Lally 1 Pts: Darragh Cummins 3, Patrick O’Connor 3, Pat Spillane 1, Sean Carrabine 2 (1f), Niall Murphy 8 (4f, 2 m), Lee Deignan 1, Luke Towey 2	Report	Gls: Ronan Boyle 1 Pts: Michael Byrne 1f, Dermot McAleese 1, Colm McLarnon 1, Patrick McBride 6, Ruairi McCann 2 (1 m, 1f), Declan Lynch 1, Niall Burns 1f	Referee: Margaret Farrelly (Cavan)

==== Round 5 ====
2 March 2024 Round 5	Limerick	0-14 (14) – (19) 1-16	Clare	Rathkeale
18:00 IST (UTC+1)				Venue: Mick Neville Park
	Pts: Barry Coleman 3, Cillian Fahy 1, Robbie Childs 1, Cathal Downes 1, Jamie Baynham 3, James Naughton 4 (2f), Daniel Daly 1	Report	Gls: Brian McNamara 1 Pts: Manus Doherty 2, Daniel Walsh 2, Dermot Coughlan 1, Cormac Murray 2, Ciaran Downes 1, Emmet McMahon 4 (1f), Aaron Griffin 4	Referee: Margaret Farrelly (Cavan)

3 March 2024 Round 5	Offaly	5-15 (30) – (10) 0-10	Wicklow	Tullamore
14:00 IST (UTC+1)				Venue: O'Connor Park
	Gls: Cormac Egan 1, Eoin Carroll 1, Jordan Hayes 1, Anton Sullivan 1 (pen), Jack Bryant 1 Pts: David Dempsey 1, Lee Pearson 1, Peter Cunningham; Dylan Hyland 6 (1f), Anton Sullivan 1, Keith O’Neill 1, Jack Bryant 3, Nigel Dunne 2	Report	Pts: Tom Moran 1, Cillian McDonald 1, Dean Healy 1, Kevin Quinn 5 (3f), Brian Nesbitt 1, Oisin McGraynor 1	Referee: David Murnane (Cork)

3 March 2024 Round 5	Down	2-17 (23) – (11) 1-08	Sligo	Newry
14:00 IST (UTC+1)				Venue: Páirc Esler
	Gls: Ceilum Doherty 1, James Guinness 1 Pts: John O’Hare 1f, Ryan McEvoy 1, Ceilum Doherty 2 (1 m), Miceal Rooney, Liam Kerr 1, Daniel Guinness 2, Danny Magill 1, Pat Havern 7 (6fs), James Guinness 1, Oisin Savage 1	Report	Gls: Nathan Mullen 1 Pts: Patrick O’Connor 1, Alan McLaughlin 1, Cian Lally 1, Sean Carrabine 4 (2fs), Niall Murphy 1f	Referee: Barry Tiernan (Dublin)

3 March 2024 Round 5	Antrim	0-09 (9) – (13) 0-13	Westmeath	Belfast
14:00 IST (UTC+1)				Venue: Corrigan Park
	Pts: Michael Byrne 1f, Kavan Keenan 1, Declan Lynch 1, Dermot McAleese 1, Conor Hand 1f, Ronan Boyle 1, Dominic McEnhill 3 (2f)	Report	Pts: Jonathan Lynam 2, Ronan Wallace 1, Andy McCormack 1, David Lynch 1, Ronan O'Toole 1, Sam McCartan 1, Senan Baker 2f, Conor Dillon 1, Danny McCartan 2 (1f), Kieran Martin 1	Referee: Fintan Pierce (Offaly)

==== Round 6 ====
16 March 2024 Round 6	Wicklow	0-09 (9) – (8) 0-08	Limerick	Aughrim
15:00 IST (UTC+1)				Venue: Aughrim County Ground
	Pts: M Nolan 1, G Fogarty 1, D Healy 2, C O’Brien 1, K Quinn 3 (2f), O McGraynor 1	Report	Pts: J Ryan 4f, C Fahy 1, R Childs 1 m, J Naughton 1f, B Mix 1	Referee: Pat Clarke (Cavan)

17 March 2024 Round 6	Clare	0-15 (15) – (12) 0-12	Antrim	Ennis
12:30 IST (UTC+1)				Venue: Cusack Park
	Pts: G Murray 1, D Coughlan 1, A Griffin 3, C Downes 3f, M McInerney 4f, C Murray 2, J McGann 1	Report	Pts: D Lynch 1, D McAleese 1 m, J Finnegan 1, E McCabe 1, P McBride 3, R McCann 1, M Jordan 1, P Shivers 1f, R McQuillan 2 (1f)	Referee: Derek O’Mahoney (Tipperary)

17 March 2024 Round 6	Sligo	0-13 (13) – (13) 1-10	Offaly	Sligo
14:00 IST (UTC+1)				Venue: Markievicz Park
	Pts: D Cummins 1, N Mullen 1, P O’Connor 1, P Kilcoyne 1, A McLoughlin 3, S Carrabine 4 (3f), N Murphy 2 (1f)	Report	Gls: A Sullivan 1 (pen); Pts: L Pearson 1, D Hyland 5 (1 m), K O’Neill 2, J Byrant 1, N Dunne 1f	Referee: Fergal Kelly (Longford)

17 March 2024 Round 6	Westmeath	0-13 (13) – (13) 1-10	Down	Mullingar
14:00 IST (UTC+1)				Venue: Cusack Park
	Pts: J Dolan 1, R Connellan 1, J Lynam 1, K Martin 1, R O’Toole 1, L Loughlin 3 (2fs), R Forde 4 (2fs), M Whittaker 1	Report	Gls: D Guinness 1 Pts: R McEvoy 1, C Doherty 1, D Magill 1, R Johnston 1, O Murdoch 1, P Havern 4 (3fs), J Guinness 1	Referee: James Molloy (Galway)

==== Round 7 ====
24 March 2024 Round 7	Sligo	1-14 (17) – (11) 0-11	Westmeath	Sligo
14:00 IST (UTC+1)				Venue: Markievicz Park
	Gls: S Carrabine 1 Pts: D Cummins 1, A McLoughlin 5, L Deignan 1, S Carrabine 2 (1f), N Murphy 5	Report	Pts: S McCartan 1, D Lynch 1, A McCormack 1, R O’Toole 2, L Loughlin 4 (2f), J Heslin 2 (1f)	Referee: Jonathan Hayes (Limerick)

24 March 2024 Round 7	Offaly	1-10 (13) – (12) 0-12	Limerick	Tullamore
14:00 IST (UTC+1)				Venue: O'Connor Park
	Gls: C Flynn 1 Pts: J Furlong 1, D Hyland 5, J Bryant 1f, K O'Neill 1 m, A Sullivan 1, N Poland 1m	Report	Pts: B Coleman 1, R Childs 1, C Downes 3, J Naughton 4fs, P Nash 1, S Costelloe 1, D Kelly 1f	Referee: John Gilmartin (Sligo)

24 March 2024 Round 7	Down	3-15 (24) – (13) 1-10	Clare	Newry
14:00 IST (UTC+1)				Venue: Páirc Esler
	Gls: C Doherty 1, O Murdock 1 (pen), D Magill 1 Pts: C Doherty 2, M Rooney 1, D Guinness 1, D Magill 2, L Kerr 3, R Johnston 1, P Havern 5 (3fs)	Report	Gls: A Griffin 1 Pts: S Ryan 1, E McMahon 1f, C Downes 4 (3fs), D Coughlan 1, M McInerney 2, D O’Donnell 1f	Referee: David Coldrick (Meath)

24 March 2024 Round 7	Antrim	1-14 (17) – (14) 0-14	Wicklow	Belfast
14:00 IST (UTC+1)				Venue: Corrigan Park
	Gls: R McCann 1 Pts: E Walsh 1, R Boyle 1, M Jordan 1, P McBride 4 (1f), R McQuillan 4 (3fs), R McCann 1, D McEnhill 2 (1f)	Report	Pts: P O'Keane 1, D Healy 2, C O'Brien 2, J Carlin 1, K Quinn 7 (5fs), J Kirwan 1	Referee: Kevin Faloon (Armagh)

=== Final ===
30 March 2024 Final	Down	0-13 (13) – (16) 2-10	Westmeath	Dublin
19:15 IST (UTC+1)				Venue: Croke Park
	Pts: Pat Havern 7 (7f), Liam Kerr 3, Miceal Rooney 1, Odhran Murdock 1, Oisin Savage 1	Report	Gls: Jonathan Lynam 2 Pts: Sam McCartan 4 (2 '45), Robbie Forde 3 (1f), David Lynch 1, Conor Dillon 1, Luke Loughlin 1	Referee: Barry Tiernan (Dublin); TV: TG4

== Division 4 ==
=== Table ===
Pos	Team	Pld	W	D	L	PF	PA	PD	Pts	Qualification
1	Laois	7	6	0	1	136	79	+57	12	Advance to NFL Division 4 Final and promotion to 2025 NFL Division 3
2	Leitrim (Note: Leitrim are ranked ahead of Wexford because they won the head-to-head game between the teams)	7	5	0	2	114	93	+21	10	Advance to NFL Division 4 Final and promotion to 2025 NFL Division 3
3	Wexford	7	5	0	2	127	90	+37	10	
4	Longford	7	4	0	3	112	102	+10	8	
5	Carlow	7	4	0	3	103	109	−6	8	
6	Tipperary	7	1	2	4	87	108	−21	4	
7	London	7	1	1	5	80	108	−28	3	
8	Waterford	7	0	1	6	76	146	−70	1	

Source: GAA.ie
Rules for classification: Tiebreakers

=== Matches ===
==== Round 1 ====
27 January 2024 Round 1	Laois	1-12 (15) – (13) 2-07	Longford	Portlaoise
				Venue: O'Moore Park
	Gls: Damon Larkin 1 Pts: Killian Roche 5 (2f), Damon Larkin 2, Mark Barry 2 (1f), Evan O’Carroll 3 (2f)	Report	Gls: Darren Gallagher 1 (1 pen), Dylan Farrell 1 Pts: Ryan Moffett 1, Darren Gallagher 1 (1f), Joe Hagan 1, Cathal McCabe 2, Mark Hughes 1 (1 m)	Referee: Kieran Eannetta (Tyrone)

27 January 2024 Round 1	Tipperary	1-14 (17) – (19) 3-10	Carlow	Thurles
				Venue: Semple Stadium
	Gls: P Creedon 1 Pts: J Kennedy 2 (2f), S Neville 1, R Quigley 1, P Creedon 1, S O’Connor 9 (6f)	Report	Gls: A Amond 1, D Foley 1, C Crowley 1 Pts: J Clarke 1, C Hulton 1, R Dunphy 2, D Foley 4 (3f), C Crowley 1, J Phiri 1	Referee: N Quinn (Clare)

28 January 2024 Round 1	London	1-09 (12) – (16) 1-13	Wexford	Ruislip
				Venue: McGovern Park
	Gls: Eoghan Nolan 1 Pts: Dylan Furlong 1, Glen Malone 2, Niall Hughes 1, Eoghan Nolan 1, Kevin O'Grady 3, Ben Brosnan 2f, Cian Hughes 1, Jonathan Bealin 1	Report	Gls: Daniel Clarke 1 Pts: Ciaran McKeon 1, Liam Gallagher 4f, Daniel Clarke 1, Shay Rafter 2f	Referee: John Ryan (Cork)

28 January 2024 Round 1	Waterford	1-05 (8) – (23) 2-17	Leitrim	Dungarvan
				Venue: Fraher Field
	Gls: D Ryan 1 Pts: D Ryan 2, M Curry 1, J Keane 1, A Dunwoody 1f	Report	Gls: R O’Rourke 1, E Sweeney 1 Pts: D Rooney 10 (5fs), R O’Rourke 1, S Quinn 2, J McGreal 1, J Foley 1, A Flynn 1, P Dolan 1	Referee: J Hayes (Limerick)

==== Round 2 ====
3 February 2024 Round 2	Carlow	1-17 (20) – (9) 0-09	Waterford	Carlow
18:00 IST (UTC+1)				Venue: Dr Cullen Park
	Gls: Jamie Clarke 1 Pts: Mikey Bambrick 1, Aaron Amond 1, Conor Doyle 1 ('45), Colm Hulton 4, Jordan Morrissey 2, Ross Dunphy 1, John Phiri 1, Darragh Foley 4 (2fs), Conor Crowley 1, Cormac Lomax 1	Report	Pts: Jason Curry 5 (3fs), Stephen Curry 1, Alan Dunwoody 1, Caolan Mac Craith 1, Tom O’Connell 1	Referee: Pat Clarke (Cavan)

3 February 2024 Round 2	Wexford	0-12 (12) – (22) 1-19	Laois	Wexford
18:00 IST (UTC+1)				Venue: Wexford Park
	Pts: Glen Malone 3, Páraic Hughes 1, Darragh Lyons 1, Seán Nolan 1, Eoghan Nolan 1f, Kevin O’Grady 1, Ben Brosnan 1f, Richie Waters 2, Shane Pettitt 1	Report	Gls: Shaun Fitzpatrick 1 Pts: Killian Roche 5 (2f, 3 ‘45s), Ben Dempsey 1, Brian Byrne 1, Damon Larkin 2, Shaun Fitzpatrick 2, Niall Dunne 1, Kevin Swayne 1, Mark Barry 1, Evan O’Carroll 4 (1f), Simon Fingleton 1	Referee: Barry Tiernan (Dublin)

4 February 2024 Round 2	Leitrim	1-08 (11) – (6) 0-06	London	Carrick-on-Shannon
13:00 IST (UTC+1)				Venue: Páirc Seán Mac Diarmada
	Gls: Ryan O’Rourke 1 Pts: Riordan O'Rourke 2, Darragh Rooney 5 (3f), Evan Sweeney 1	Report	Pts: Liam Gallagher 1f, Patrick Dolan 2, Cathal Lacey 2f, Shay Rafter 1f	Referee: Tommy Murphy (Galway)

4 February 2024 Round 2	Longford	0-14 (14) – (16) 0-16	Tipperary	Longford
14:00 IST (UTC+1)				Venue: Pearse Park
	Pts: K McGann 2, M Quinn 1, D Gallagher 6 (4f), Dylan Farrell 3f, J Matthews 1, Mark Hughes 1	Report	Pts: S O’Brien 1, Jack Kennedy 2 (1 ’45,1f), C Deeley 2, Jack Kennedy 1, P Creedon 2, S O’Connor 8 (5f)	Referee: Christopher Ryan (Galway)

==== Round 3 ====
17 February 2024 Round 3	Waterford	0-13 (13) – (16) 0-16	Longford	Dungarvan
18:00 IST (UTC+1)				Venue: Fraher Field
	Pts: D Ryan 2, R McGrath 1, M Mullaney 1, S Curry 1, T O'Connell 6 (5f), J Curry 2f	Report	Pts: B Masterson 1, Dessie Reynolds 1, D Gallagher 2 (1f, 1 '45), P Kiernan 1, Daniel Reynolds 1, M Quinn 1, J Hagan 1, J Matthews 3f, Mark Hughes 4 (1 m), D Mimnagh 1	Referee: J Ryan (Cork)

17 February 2024 Round 3	Laois	2-14 (20) – (9) 0-09	Carlow	Portlaoise
18:00 IST (UTC+1)				Venue: O'Moore Park
	Gls: Damon Larkin 1, Kevin Swayne 1 Pts: Damon Larkin 1, Killian Roche 3 (2f, 1 '45), Mark Barry 3 (2f), Niall Dunne 2, Shaun Fitzpatrick 2, Brian Daly 1, Paul Kingston 1, Brian Byrne 1	Report	Pts: Darragh Foley 4 (2f), Conor Crowley 2, Colm Hulton 1, Jordan Morrissey 1, Conor Doyle 1	Referee: Anthony Nolan (Wicklow)

18 February 2024 Round 3	London	1-08 (11) – (11) 0-11	Tipperary	Ruislip
13:00 IST (UTC+1)				Venue: McGovern Park
	Gls: Liam Gallagher 1 Pts: Cathal Lacey 3 (1f), Patrick Dolan 1, Ruairi Rafferty 2, Shay Rafter 1, Cahir Healy 1	Report	Pts: Shane O’Connell 1, Jack Kennedy 2 (1f), Stephen Grogan 1, Jack Kennedy 3 (1 m), Sean O’Connor 3f, Peter McGarry 1	Referee: Kevin Faloon (Armagh)

18 February 2024 Round 3	Leitrim	3-07 (16) – (15) 2-09	Wexford	Carrick-on-Shannon
13:00 IST (UTC+1)				Venue: Páirc Seán Mac Diarmada
	Gls: Ryan O'Rourke 3 (1 pen); Pts: Nevin O'Donnell 1 ('45'), Barry McNulty 1, Ryan O'Rourke 3 (1f), Darragh Rooney 2	Report	Gls: Niall Hughes 1, Ben Brosnan 1 Pts: Darragh Lyons 1, Páraic Hughes 1, Glen Malone 1, Liam Coleman 1, Richie Waters 1, Kevin O'Grady 1, Sean Nolan 2, Ben Brosnan 1	Referee: Mark Dorrian (Donegal)

==== Round 4 ====
24 February 2024 Round 4	Wexford	0-21 (21) – (10) 1-07	Waterford	Wexford
17:00 IST (UTC+1)				Venue: Wexford Park
	Pts: Glen Malone 4, Liam Coleman 1, Kevin O’Grady 2, Graeme Cullen 1, Eoghan Nolan 2 (1 f, 1 ‘45), Seán Nolan 3 (2 fs), Shane Pettitt 1, Dylan Furlong 1, Mark Rossiter 1, Ben Brosnan 5 (3fs)	Report	Gls: Alan Dunwoody 1 Pts: Michael Curry 1, Tom O’Connell 2 (1f), Jason Curry 2 (1f), Stephen Curry 2	Referee: Seamus Mulvihill (Kerry)

25 February 2024 Round 4	Longford	3-12 (21) – (13) 1-10	London	Longford
13:00 IST (UTC+1)				Venue: Pearse Park
	Gls: K McGann 1, Dessie Reynolds 1, D Mimnagh 1 Pts: Dessie Reynolds 1, D Gallagher 3 (1f, 2 ’45), J Hagan 1, Daniel Reynolds 1, D Mimnagh 3, C McCabe 2, D Farrell 1	Report	Gls: L Gallagher 1 Pts: C McKeon 1, L Gallagher 1, C Diver 2, P Dolan 6fs	Referee: Niall Quinn (Clare)

25 February 2024 Round 4	Carlow	2-14 (20) – (19) 1-16	Leitrim	Carlow
14:00 IST (UTC+1)				Venue: Dr Cullen Park
	Gls: Colm Hulton 1, Jamie Clarke 1 Pts: Darragh Foley 6 (1f), Colm Hulton 1, Jamie Clarke 1, Mark Furey 1, Niall Hickey 1, Ross Dunphy 1, Conor Crowley 1, Paddy McDonnell 1, Josh Moore 1	Report	Gls: Ryan O'Rourke 1 Pts: Darragh Rooney 7 (6fs), Ryan O'Rourke 2, Barry McNulty 3, Paul Keaney 2, Niall Walsh 1, Jack Gilheany 1	Referee: Christopher Ryan (Galway)

25 February 2024 Round 4	Tipperary	1-07 (10) – (11) 0-11	Laois	Thurles
14:00 IST (UTC+1)				Venue: Semple Stadium
	Gls: S O Connor 1 Pts: J Kennedy 3, S O Connor 3, R Quigley 1	Report	Pts: B Byrne 1, D Larkin 1, S Fitzpatrick 2, M Barry 1, E O Carroll 4, P Kingston 1, K Lillis 1	Referee: F Pierce (Offaly)

==== Round 5 ====
2 March 2024 Round 5	Carlow	0-07 (7) – (17) 1-14	Wexford	Carlow
19:00 IST (UTC+1)				Venue: Dr Cullen Park
	Pts: Conor Doyle 1 (1 '45), Ross Dunphy 3, Darragh Foley 3f	Report	Gls: Ben Brosnan 1 Pts: Eoin Porter 1, Darragh Lyons 1, Dylan Furlong 1, Niall Hughes 1, Paraic Hughes 1, Mark Rossiter 2, Sean Nolan 3 (1f), Graeme Cullen 1, Conor Kinsella 2, Tom Byrne 1	Referee: Alan Coyne (Westmeath)

2 March 2024 Round 5	Laois	2-12 (16) – (9) 0-09	London	Portlaoise
19:00 IST (UTC+1)				Venue: O'Moore Park
	Gls: Kevin Swayne 1, Evan O'Carroll 1 Pts: Mark Timmons 1, Eoin Lowry 1, Shaun Fitzpatrick 1, Mark Barry 5 (2f, 1 m), Evan O'Carroll 3 (1f, 1 m), Paul Kingston 1, Brian Daly 1	Report	Pts: Nathan McElwaine 1, Liam Gallagher 2, Patrick Dolan 2f, Ciaran Diver 3, Shay Rafter 1f	Referee: Enda McFeely (Donegal)

3 March 2024 Round 5	Tipperary	0-16 (16) – (16) 1-13	Waterford	Bansha
14:00 IST (UTC+1)				Venue: Galtee Rovers GAA
	Pts: S O'Connor 8 (5fs), P Creedon 3, J Kennedy 3, M Stokes 1, J Morris 1	Report	Gls: A Dunwoody 1 Pts: J Curry 6 (4fs), C McGrath 2, R McGrath 1, W Beresford 1, M Mullanny 1, S Whelan-Barrett 1, S Curry 1	Referee: D Hickey (Carlow)

3 March 2024 Round 5	Longford	1-16 (19) – (13) 0-13	Leitrim	Longford
14:00 IST (UTC+1)				Venue: Pearse Park
	Gls: C McCabe 1 Pts: Dessie Reynolds 1, D Gallagher 6 (3f, 1’45), P Kiernan 1, J Hagan 1, Daniel Reynolds 1, C McCabe 2, Mark Hughes 3 (1f, 1 m), R Harkin 1	Report	Pts: C Reynolds 1, A Flynn 1, B McNulty 1, Ryan O’Rourke 1, P Dolan 1, D Rooney 4 (1 m), M Plunkett 2, P Keaney 2	Referee: Kevin Faloon (Armagh)

==== Round 6 ====
16 March 2024 Round 6	London	1-13 (16) – (11) 0-11	Waterford	Ruislip
13:00 IST (UTC+1)				Venue: McGovern Park
		Report		Referee: Fintan Pierce (Offaly)

16 March 2024 Round 6	Laois	1-13 (16) – (17) 0-17	Leitrim	Portlaoise
16:15 IST (UTC+1)				Venue: O'Moore Park
	Gls: P Kingston 1 Pts: C Heffernan 1, M Barry 6 (3fs), E O’Carroll 3 (2fs), P Kingston 3	Report	Pts: N O'Donnell 1 ('45), D Casey 1, B McNulty 1, M Plunkett 1, R O'Rourke 6, T Prior 2, D Rooney 5fs	Referee: John Ryan (Cork)

16 March 2024 Round 6	Longford	0-14 (14) – (8) 0-08	Carlow	Longford
14:00 IST (UTC+1)				Venue: Pearse Park
	Pts: R Harkin 2, D Gallagher 3 (2fs, 1’45), P Kiernan 1, Mark Hughes 5 (1f), D Reynolds 2, D Mimnagh 1	Report	Pts: M Bambrick 2, J Morrissey 2, C Doyle 1f, N Hickey 1f, A Amond 1, J Clarke 1	Referee: Chris Maguire (Clare)

17 March 2024 Round 6	Tipperary	0-08 (8) – (22) 4-10	Wexford	Fethard
16:00 IST (UTC+1)				Venue: Fethard Town Park
	Pts: S O Connor 4 (3fs) J Kennedy 2 (1f), P McGarry 1, C Kennedy 1	Report	Gls: M Rossiter 2, S Nolan 1, C Kinsella 1 Pts: M Rossiter 1, S Nolan 2 (1f), E Nolan 2, B Brosnan 2fs, D Furlong 1, G Malone 1, L Coleman 1	Referee: David Hickey (Leitrim)

==== Round 7 ====
24 March 2024 Round 7	Wexford	2-18 (24) – (15) 2-09	Longford	Wexford
13:00 IST (UTC+1)				Venue: Wexford Park
	Gls: G Malone 1, M Rossiter 1 (pen); Pts: G Malone 2, D Furlong 1, N Hughes 2, K O’Grady 2, M Rossiter 2, S Nolan 8 (5fs, 2 m), C Kinsella 1	Report	Gls: D Mimnagh 1, C McCabe 1 Pts: D Gallagher 2 (1f, 1 ‘45), D Mimnagh 2, J Hagan 1f, Mark Hughes 4 (3fs)	Referee: Alan Coyle (Westmeath)

24 March 2024 Round 7	Leitrim	0-15 (15) – (9) 0-09	Tipperary	Carrick-on-Shannon
13:00 IST (UTC+1)				Venue: Páirc Seán Mac Diarmada
	Pts: R O'Rourke 6 (2fs), D Wrynn 1, T Prior 1, D Rooney 7 (5fs)	Report	Pts: E Comeford 1, S Neville 1, C Kennedy 1, P Creedon 1, J Kennedy 4 (1 m, 1f), M Russell 1	Referee: Margaret Farrelly (Cavan)

24 March 2024 Round 7	Carlow	1-17 (20) – (13) 1-10	London	Carlow
13:00 IST (UTC+1)				Venue: Dr Cullen Park
		Report

24 March 2024 Round 7	Waterford	0-09 (9) – (34) 5-19	Laois	Dungarvan
13:00 IST (UTC+1)				Venue: Fraher Field
	Pts: J Curry 4 (3fs), S Curry 1 m, T O'Connell 2 (1f, 1 m), D Fitzgerald 2	Report	Gls: M Barry 2, E O’Carroll 1, P Kingston 1, R Murphy 1 Pts: K Roche 2 (1f, 1 '45), E Lowry 2fs, M Barry 3, E O’Carroll 3, P Kingston 3, R Murphy 1f, B Daly 2 (1 m), Niall Dunne 1, C Heffernan 1	Referee: David Hickey (Carlow)

=== Final ===
30 March 2024 Round 7	Laois	3-14 (23) – (9) 0-09	Leitrim	Dublin
17:00 IST (UTC+1)				Venue: Croke Park
	Gls: Ben Dempsey 1, Eoin Lowry 1, Paul Kingston 1 Pts: Evan O'Carroll 6 (2f), Eoin Lowry 2, Mark Barry 2, Paul Kingston 2, Kieran Lillis 1 (1 m), Rioghan Murphy 1	Report	Pts: Nevin O'Donnell 3 (1f, 1 '45), Ryan O'Rourke 2, Riordan O'Rourke 2, Barry McNulty 1, Mark Plunkett 1	Referee: Thomas Murphy (Galway); TV: TG4
