= Niall Sharkey =

Louth Gaelic footballer

Personal information
- Born: 1996 or 1997 (age 29–30)

Sport
- Sport: Gaelic football
Club
- Years: Club
- Glyde Rangers
Inter-county
- Years: County
- Louth
- Leinster titles: 0

Niall Sharkey is an Irish Gaelic footballer who plays as a defender for Glyde Rangers and the Louth county team.

Sharkey was Senior Footballer of the Year in the 2022 season. He played for Louth in the 2023 Leinster Senior Football Championship final when Mickey Harte managed. He also played for Louth in the 2024 Leinster Senior Football Championship final when Ger Brennan managed, which was in May of that year. After announcing his intention to go travelling the following month, Sharkey returned to Ireland play for his club in the 2025 Championship. Other commitments prevented him from immediately rejoining the inter-county set-up, although Brennan's replacement Gavin Devlin was interested in him. He had missed the 2025 Leinster Senior Football Championship final, which Louth won.
