= Dan Corcoran (Gaelic footballer) =

Irish Gaelic footballer

Personal information
- Born: 1999 or 2000 (age 26–27)

Sport
- Sport: Gaelic football
Club
- Years: Club
- Geraldines
College
- Years: College
- DCU
College titles
- Sigerson titles: 1
Inter-county
- Years: County
- 2018–: Louth

Dan Corcoran is an Irish Gaelic footballer who plays as a defender for Geraldines and the Louth county team.

Son of David and Siobhan Cocoran of Blackrock, his paternal grandsparents are from Two-Mile Borris in County Tipperary. He won the 2020 Sigerson Cup with DCU.

Corcoran played for Louth in the 2017 Leinster Minor Football Championship final. He also played against David Clifford in the 2017 All-Ireland Minor Football Championship quarter-final.

Corcoran made his senior inter-county debut in December 2018. He played in the 2023 Leinster Senior Football Championship final when Mickey Harte managed. He made his 50th appearance for Louth at the beginning of the 2024 season (13 January) when Ger Brennan managed. He then played for Louth in the 2024 Leinster Senior Football Championship final.
