= Liam Jackson =

Louth Gaelic footballer

Sport
- Sport: Gaelic football
Club
- Years: Club
- St Mary's
Inter-county
- Years: County
- Louth

Liam Jackson is an Irish Gaelic footballer who plays as an attacker for St Mary's and the Louth county team.

Jackson played for Louth in the 2017 Leinster Minor Football Championship final. He also played against David Clifford in the 2017 All-Ireland Minor Football Championship quarter-final. Jackson scored a goal against Westmeath in the 2024 Leinster Senior Football Championship. He went on to play in the final. His brother Tom has also played in the same Louth team with him.
