= Paddy Neilan =

Gaelic football referee

Paddy Neilan is a Gaelic football referee. He has refereed several All-Ireland Finals and the Connacht and Munster Senior Football Championship Finals.

== Career ==
He was a controversial selection to referee the 2017 National League final. But he refereed the game very well and then got booed and dissected on TV the night of a qualifier between Armagh and Tipperary in Thurles went wrong. Another escort from the pitch a Guard either side of him followed after Meath and Tyrone played out a 2018 All Ireland Qualifier.

He refereed the 2017 Munster Senior Football Championship final. Dublin manager Jim Gavin criticised him after Kerry won.

By 2019, he had refereed in every county except Waterford, Wexford, and Westmeath. He was referee for the Donegal and Kerry Super 8s game in the 2019 All-Ireland Senior Football Championship. He is considered the top referee in Connacht (including Roscommon).

He refereed the 2022 Munster Senior Football Championship semi-final, which Limerick qualified for the final for after twelve years of absence.

Neilan refereed the 2022 All-Ireland Senior Football Championship semi-final between Dublin and Kerry. He did the game without Hawk-Eye because it broke down the day before.

After praise for how he handled the semi-final, Neilan was named as standby referee and linesman for the 2022 All-Ireland Senior Football Championship Final.

He spent a year on the sidelines because he hurt his foot while he was officiating at a match of the 2023 National League. He returned to referee in the later rounds of the 2024 National League, and his first championship match since his return was a Quarter Final of the 2024 Leinster Senior Football Championship.

He was the referee for the 2024 All-Ireland U-20 Final in May 2024.

Then, for what was a second time over 3 seasons he was involved officiating in an All-Ireland Final when he was linesman for the 2024 All-Ireland Senior Football Championship final when Armagh and Galway clashed.

Then he was in charge of the 2025 All-Ireland Club Final in January 2025. With a Galwayman refereeing the Hurling Final, it meant Connacht had the referee for both Senior Club Finals that year. Then he was in charge for the 2025 Connacht Senior Football Championship Final.

== Personal life ==
Neilan is a member of St Faithleach's GAA club in County Roscommon. He is an electrician in Sligo. He is married and, as of 2019, was a father of two, living in the Ballyleague area of Roscommon.
