= Ciarán Keenan =

Louth Gaelic footballer

Personal information
- Nickname: Kiki

Sport
- Sport: Gaelic football
Club
- Years: Club
- St Mary's
Inter-county
- Years: County
- Louth
- Leinster titles: 1

Ciarán Keenan is an Irish Gaelic footballer who plays for St Mary's and the Louth county team.

Keenan played for Louth in the 2017 Leinster Minor Football Championship final. He also played against David Clifford in the 2017 All-Ireland Minor Football Championship quarter-final.

He scored a first-half goal in Louth's first win when Ger Brennan managed. He played in the 2024 Leinster Senior Football Championship final when he scored a second-half goal for Louth. Keenan won a Leinster Senior Football Championship title in 2025, when he was a sub brought on in the final.
