= Colm Basquel =

Dublin Gaelic footballer (born 1996)

Personal information
- Born: 1996 (age 29–30) Dublin, Ireland

Sport
- Sport: Gaelic football
- Position: Right corner-forward
Club
- Years: Club
- Ballyboden St Enda's
Club titles
- Dublin titles: 2
- Leinster titles: 1
- All-Ireland Titles: 1
Inter-county
- Years: County
- 2017–: Dublin
Inter-county titles
- Leinster titles: 7
- All-Irelands: 5
- NFL: 1
- All Stars: 1

Colm Basquel (born 1996) is a Gaelic footballer who plays for Ballyboden St Enda's and the senior Dublin county team.
