= Donal McKenny =

Irish Gaelic footballer

Sport
- Sport: Gaelic football
Club
- Years: Club
- St Mary's
Inter-county
- Years: County
- Louth
- Leinster titles: 1

Donal McKenny is an Irish Gaelic footballer who plays for St Mary's and the Louth county team.

He is from Ardee.

He held Paddy McBrearty scoreless from play in Louth's 2024 All-Ireland Senior Football Championship quarter-final loss. He received an All-Star nomination for his performances during the 2024 season. McKenny won a Leinster Senior Football Championship title in 2025.
