= Tommy Durnin =

Irish Gaelic footballer

Personal information
- Born: 1993/1994

Sport
- Sport: Gaelic football
Clubs
- Years: Club
- 2025–: Westerns; Inniskeen Grattans (Monaghan); St Mary's
Inter-county
- Years: County
- Louth
- Leinster titles: 1

Tommy Durnin is an Irish Gaelic footballer who plays as a midfielder for the Louth county team.

His native club is Westerns. He has also played for Inniskeen Grattans. He transferred to St Mary's in April 2025.

Durnin didn't play for Louth minors but joined the seniors towards the end of his time in college when Aidan O'Rourke managed. He was still involved with Louth when Ger Brennan managed. Durnin previously played with Brennan for a summer in Boston. He received an All-Star nomination for his performances during the 2024 season. He won a Leinster Senior Football Championship title in 2025.
