= Seán Bugler =

Footballer

Personal information
- Native name: Seán Ó Bogluír (Irish)
- Nickname: Bugsy
- Born: 1998 (age 27–28) Dublin, Ireland
- Occupation: Student
- Height: 6 ft 0 in (183 cm)

Sport
- Sport: Gaelic football
- Position: Left wing-forward
Club
- Years: Club
- St Oliver Plunketts/Eoghan Ruadh
Club titles
- Dublin titles: 0
College
- Years: College
- DCU Dóchas Éireann
College titles
- Sigerson titles: 1
Inter-county
- Years: County
- 2019–present: Dublin
Inter-county titles
- Leinster titles: 6
- All-Irelands: 2
- NFL: 1
- All Stars: 0

Seán Bugler (born 1998) is an Irish Gaelic footballer who plays for Dublin SFC club St Oliver Plunketts/Eoghan Ruadh and at inter-county level with the Dublin senior football team. He usually lines out as a defender.

== Career ==
Bugler first played Gaelic football at juvenile and underage levels with the St Oliver Plunketts/Eoghan Ruadh club before eventually progressing onto the club's senior team. He first appeared on the inter-county scene with the Dublin minor football team in 2016 before winning an All-Ireland U21 Championship title the following season. Bugler was drafted onto the Dublin senior football team in 2019 and was part of the extended panel for the All-Ireland Championship-winning team. He won a Sigerson Cup title with DCU Dóchas Éireann in 2020, before ending the season by claiming an All-Ireland winners' medal on the field of play. Bugler has also won three consecutive Leinster Championships and a National League

== Honours ==
DCU Dóchas Éireann

- Sigerson Cup: 2020

Dublin

- All-Ireland Senior Football Championship: 2019, 2020
- Leinster Senior Football Championship: 2019, 2020, 2021
- National Football League: 2021
- All-Ireland Under-21 Football Championship: 2017
- Leinster Under-21 Football Championship: 2017
