= Niall McDonnell (Gaelic footballer) =

Irish Gaelic footballer

Sport
- Sport: Gaelic football
- Position: Goalkeeper
Club
- Years: Club
- St Fechin's
Inter-county
- Years: County
- 2024–: Louth
- Leinster titles: 1

Niall McDonnell is an Irish Gaelic footballer who plays as a goalkeeper for St Fechin's and the Louth county team.

McDonnell first played for Louth in the 2024 season when Ger Brennan managed, making his debut against Meath in the 2024 O'Byrne Cup, followed by his National League debut against Armagh in the 2024 NFL. He won a Leinster Senior Football Championship title in 2025. He was previously dropped for being overweight when Mickey Harte managed.
