= Eoin Murchan =

Irish Gaelic footballer (born 1996)

Personal information
- Born: 1996 (age 29–30) Dublin, Ireland
- Occupation: Financial consultant
- Height: 1.70 m (5 ft 7 in)

Sport
- Sport: Gaelic football
- Position: Right corner-back
Club
- Years: Club
- Na Fianna
Club titles
- Dublin titles: 0
College
- Years: College
- 2014-2018: University College Dublin
College titles
- Sigerson titles: 1
Inter-county
- Years: County
- 2017–present: Dublin
Inter-county titles
- Leinster titles: 8
- All-Irelands: 5
- NFL: 2
- All Stars: 1

Eoin Murchan (born 1996) is an Irish Gaelic footballer who plays for the Na Fianna club and at senior level for the Dublin county team.

Murchan did not start the 2019 All-Ireland Senior Football Championship Final, which finished in a draw. He was then named from the start in the replay and scored a goal straight from the second-half throw-in by racing straight for the Kerry goal, hitting the ball into the right corner of the net. Joe Brolly later described Murchan's goal as "arguably the most important moment in the history of Dublin football". Murchan received The Throw-In's final Rising Star award of the competition as a result.

Murchan is a pianist.

== Honours ==
University College Dublin

- Sigerson Cup: 2018

Na Fianna

- Dublin Intermediate Football Championship: 2017

Dublin

- All-Ireland Senior Football Championship: 2017, 2018, 2019, 2020, 2023
- Leinster Senior Football Championship: 2017, 2018, 2019, 2020, 2021, 2022, 2023
- National Football League Division 1: 2018, 2021
- National Football League Division 2: 2023
- All-Ireland Under-21 Football Championship: 2017
- Leinster Under-21 Football Championship: 2015, 2016, 2017
- Leinster Minor Football Championship: 2014
