= Ciarán Downey =

Irish Gaelic footballer

Sport
- Sport: Gaelic football
- Position: Attacker
Club
- Years: Club
- Newtown Blues
Inter-county
- Years: County
- Louth
- Leinster titles: 1

Ciarán Downey is an Irish Gaelic footballer who plays as an attacker for Newtown Blues and the Louth county team.

Downey began playing for Louth in 2018. He reached the 2023 Leinster Senior Football Championship final when Mickey Harte managed. Louth returned to that position in the 2024 Leinster Senior Football Championship final when Ger Brennan managed. Downey was then injured against Monaghan in Group 4 Round 2 (June). He won a Leinster Senior Football Championship title in 2025 when Ger Brennan also managed. He went to the 2026 All-Ireland Senior Football Championship semi-final when Gavin Devlin managed.

In 2025 he began working as a GAA development officer at St Oliver's Community College, Drogheda.
