= Dermot Campbell =

Louth Gaelic footballer

Personal information
- Born: 1993/1994

Sport
- Sport: Gaelic football
- Position: Full-back
Club
- Years: Club
- Dreadnots
Inter-county
- Years: County
- Louth
- Leinster titles: 1

Dermot Campbell is an Irish Gaelic footballer who plays as a full-back for Dreadnots and the Louth county team.

He made his U21s debut in 2014. He began to become more involved with the seniors from the 2019 season onwards.

Campbell won a Leinster Senior Football Championship title in 2025, after which he threw the Delaney Cup across the goal at the Canal End of Croke Park.

He works with young players at Ardee Community School.
