= Conor Grimes =

Irish Gaelic footballer

Personal information
- Born: 1994/1995

Sport
- Sport: Gaelic football
Club
- Years: Club
- Glen Emmets
Inter-county
- Years: County
- Louth
- Leinster titles: 1

Conor Grimes is an Irish Gaelic footballer who plays as a midfielder, full-forward or wing-forward for Glen Emmets and the Louth county team.

Grimes played as a Louth minor then advanced to the senior panel in 2014. After relegation to Division 3, Grimes made his senior inter-county championship debut for Louth against Westmeath in the 2014 Leinster Senior Football Championship. He was the scorer of the winning goal against Antrim when Louth won the 2016 Division 4 title. When he was 22 he left to go travelling (see below), meaning he did not take part in the 2017 championship.

Grimes returned in time to win a Leinster Senior Football Championship title in 2025. He played his 100th match for Louth against Tyrone in the 2026 League. As a result he was Man of the Match in Louth's first victory against Tyrone since 1994. He went to the 2026 All-Ireland Senior Football Championship semi-final later that year.

== Personal life ==
Grimes broke his leg and his ankle in his youth. He has also been through an ACL injury. He travelled to New Zealand and Australia in 2017, when he was 22, returning through India, and was inspired to set up a food business as a result. He began that business in 2018. He became a dad in 2024.
