= Bevan Duffy =

Irish Gaelic footballer

Sport
- Sport: Gaelic football
Club
- Years: Club
- St Fechin's
Inter-county
- Years: County
- Louth
- Leinster titles: 1

Bevan Duffy is an Irish Gaelic footballer who plays for St Fechin's and the Louth county team.

Duffy began playing for Louth in 2015, won a Leinster Senior Football Championship title in 2025 and retired at the end of 2025. He was 25 years before he joined up with the team. He is a former captain of Louth.
