= Sam Mulroy =

Gaelic footballer

Personal information
- Native name: Somhairle Ó Maolrua (Irish)
- Born: 1998 (age 27–28) County Louth, Ireland

Sport
- Sport: Gaelic football
Club
- Years: Club
- Current: Naomh Máirtín
Inter-county*
| Years | County | Apps (scores) |
| 2017– | Louth | 23 (7–99) |
Inter-county titles
- Leinster titles: 1
- All Stars: 1
- *Inter County team apps and scores correct as of match played 30 June 2024.

Sam Mulroy is a Gaelic footballer from County Louth in Ireland. He made his debut for the Louth senior football team in 2017.

== Louth ==
Mulroy was appointed Louth team captain in 2021 by Mickey Harte. He is a regular top scorer and was second behind Ryan O'Donoghue in the 2024 All-Ireland Senior Football Championship scoring charts. His scores in the 2024 All-Ireland Senior Football Championship helped Louth beat Meath (a first championship win over Meath for nearly half a century, coming in Round 1 of Group 4, 25 May) and Cork (preliminary quarter-final, 23 June).

Mulroy received an All-Star nomination for his performances during 2024 in the Louth jersey.

Louth qualified for a third consecutive Leinster senior football final in 2025. Mulroy contributed 1-7 and received the Man of the Match award, as Louth narrowly defeated Meath to win a first provincial title since 1957.

== Career statistics ==
As of match played 30 June 2024

| Team | Year | National League | | | Leinster | | All-Ireland | | Total | |
| Team | Year | Division | Apps | Score | Apps | Score | Apps | Score | Apps | Score |
|---|---|---|---|---|---|---|---|---|---|---|
| Louth | 2017 | Division 3 | | | 1 | 0-00 | 0 | 0-00 | 1 | 0-00 | | |
| Louth | 2017 | 2018 | Division 2 | | | 0 | 0-00 | 1 | 0-00 | 1 | 0-00 | |
| Louth | 2017 | 2019 | Division 3 | | | 2 | 0-03 | 1 | 0-00 | 3 | 0-03 | |
| Louth | 2017 | 2020 | Division 3 | | | | 1 | 1-07 | — | | 1 | 1-07 |
| Louth | 2017 | 2021 | Division 4 | | | ************ Did not play ************ | | | | | | |
| Louth | 2017 | 2022 | Division 3 | | | 2 | 2-10 | 1 | 0-04 | 3 | 2-14 | |
| Louth | 2017 | 2023 | Division 2 | | | 3 | 1-20 | 3 | 0-12 | 6 | 1-32 | |
| Louth | 2017 | 2024 | Division 2 | | | | 3 | 2-17 | 5 | 1-26 | 8 | 3-43 |
| Career total | | | | | 12 | 6-57 | 11 | 1-42 | 23 | 7-99 |

== Honours ==
Louth

- Leinster Senior Football Championship (1): 2025 (c)
- NFL Division 3 (1): 2022
- NFL Division 4 (1): 2021

Naomh Máirtín

- Louth Senior Football Championship (3): 2020, 2021, 2025
- Cardinal O'Donnell Cup (2): 2017, 2019
- Louth Minor Football Championship (1): 2016
- Louth Minor Football League (1): 2016

Individual

- All Star (1): 2025

Sporting positions
| Preceded by Bevan Duffy | Louth Senior Football Captain; 2021–present | Incumbent |
