= Ciarán Byrne =

Louth Gaelic footballer and Australian rules footballer

Personal information
- Nickname: Casey
- Born: 6 December 1994 (age 31)

Sport
- Sport: Gaelic football
- Position: Forward
Club
- Years: Club
- St Mochta's
Inter-county
- Years: County
- 2013; 2020–: Louth
Inter-county titles
- Leinster titles: 0
- All-Irelands: 0
- NFL: 0
- All Stars: 0

Ciarán Byrne (born 6 December 1994) is a Gaelic footballer who plays for the St Mochta's club at senior level for the Louth county team. He previously played professional Australian rules football for the Carlton Football Club.

His nickname ("Casey") was the result of his younger sister's inability to pronounce Ciarán, and was used during his time at Carlton. He is the younger brother of Declan.

== Early career ==
Byrne was a talented prospect in Gaelic football. He was selected for the Louth county team panel at the age of 18, and scored five points in a 2013 All-Ireland Senior Football Championship qualifier match against Kildare at Newbridge. Byrne played for Ireland in both Tests of the 2013 International Rules Series.

== AFL career ==
Ciarán Byrne

Personal information
- Full name: Ciarán Byrne
- Nickname: Casey
- Original team: St Mochta's/Louth (county team)
- Draft: Pick 64, 2013 AFL Rookie Draft
- Height: 188 cm (74 in)
- Weight: 88 kg (194 lb)
- Position: Half-back

Playing career^{1}
Years	Club	Games (Goals)
2014–2018	Carlton	22 (0)
- ^{1} Playing statistics correct to the end of 2018.

In August 2013, Byrne signed a two-year Category B rookie contract AFL club Carlton.

Byrne made his senior AFL debut in Round 3, 2015 against Essendon at the MCG; however, after a hamstring injury in that game, he missed the remainder of the season, playing only a couple of games for Carlton's VFL-affiliate, the Northern Blues. He became a regular in the team's backline in the early part of 2016, playing 11 of Carlton's first 14 games before rupturing his right anterior cruciate ligament, an injury which caused him to miss the rest of the 2016 AFL season.

In October 2018, Byrne informed Carlton Football Club of his decision to retire from AFL football and to return to Ireland. Byrne stated that he had fallen "out of love" with the Australian code and wanted to return to Gaelic football.

== Return to Gaelic football ==
After returning to Ireland, Byrne resumed his Gaelic football career with the St Mochta's club. Shortly after resuming the game he dislocated his ankle in the Louth Intermediate Football Championship final (which St Mochta's won after appearing there for the first time since 1981). This injury caused Byrne to miss another season, and was initially thought to be career-threatening. He recovered with the aid of reformer pilates (which he had first used while recovering from injury in the AFL) and subsequently began a pilates business in his home village of Louth, County Louth.

Byrne was selected to play for Louth again and joined the county's senior football panel in 2020

Against Dublin in the 2026 All-Ireland Senior Football Championship, Byrne "ran 15 yards, launched himself into the air and came down with about as spectacular a match-winning catch as you're going to see", according to The Irish Times.

== Honours ==
- National Football League Division 3 (1): 2022
- National Football League Division 4 (1): 2021
- Louth Intermediate Football Championship (1): 2018
- Leinster Colleges Senior Football Championship (1): 2011

== See also ==
- List of players who have converted from one football code to another
