= Tom Lahiff (Gaelic footballer) =

Irish Gaelic footballer

Personal information
- Born: 18 May 1995 (age 31) Dublin, Ireland

Sport
- Sport: Gaelic Football
- Position: Midfield
Club
- Years: Club
- 2014–: St Jude's
Club titles
- Dublin titles: 0
College
- Years: College
- 2012-2018: DCU Dóchas Éireann
Inter-county*
Years	County	Apps (scores)
2019–	Dublin	6 (0-01)
Inter-county titles
- Leinster titles: 5
- All-Irelands: 2
- NFL: 1
- *Inter County team apps and scores correct as of 18:22, 22 February 2022.

Thomas Lahiff (born 18 May 1995) is an Irish Gaelic footballer who plays for Dublin SFC club St Jude's and at inter-county level with the Dublin senior football team. He usually lines out as a midfielder.

== Career ==
Lahiff first came to sporting prominence playing soccer. He played at under-19 level with Bray Wanderers before making it onto the first team squad, however, the leap to becoming a full-time professional in Britain remained unfulfilled. Lahiff joined the St Jude's in 2014 and has been a mainstay of the senior team since then. He first appeared on the inter-county scene as a member of the Dublin under-21 football team and won a Leinster U21 Championship title in 2016. Lahiff joined the senior team for the 2019 O'Byrne Cup pre-season tournament and was an unused substitute when Dublin beat Mayo in the 2020 All-Ireland final. His other honours include two Leinster Championships and a National League title.

== Honours ==
Dublin

- All-Ireland Senior Football Championship (2): 2020, 2023
- Leinster Senior Football Championship (5): 2020, 2021, 2022, 2023, 2024
- National Football League (1): 2021
- Leinster Under-21 Football Championship (1): 2016
