= 2009 O'Byrne Cup =

Tournament details
- Province: Leinster
- Year: 2009
- Trophy: O'Byrne Cup

Winners
- Champions: Louth (4th win)
- Manager: Eamonn McEneaney
- Captain: Shane Lennon

The 2009 O'Byrne Cup was a Gaelic football competition played by the teams of Leinster GAA. The competition differs from the Leinster Senior Football Championship as it also features further education colleges and the winning team does not progress to another tournament at All-Ireland level. The winners of the 2009 O'Byrne Cup were Louth.

== O'Byrne Cup ==
First round 4 January 2009
Louth	2-14
U.C.D.	1-02
Longford	2-12
A.I.T.	1-07
Dublin	0-15
Offaly	1-07
Wicklow	2-10
Carlow	1-08
Kildare	1-12
Wexford	0-09
Meath	1-17
Westmeath	0-07
D.C.U.	1-14
Laois	1-13
D.I.T	0-18
Kilkenny	2-06

Quarter-finals; 11 January 2009
Louth	4-12
Longford	0-05
Dublin	0-06
Wicklow	0-09
Kildare	1-10
Meath	0-08
D.C.U.	0-11
D.I.T.	0-05

Semi-finals; 18 January 2009
Louth	2-19
Wicklow	1-10
Kildare	0-11
D.C.U.	2-08

Final; 25 January 2009
Louth	1-17
D.C.U.	1-10

=== First round ===
The eight winning teams from the first round of the O'Byrne Cup go on to qualify for the quarter-finals of the tournament. The losers of the first round go on to the O'Byrne Shield quarter finals.

4 January 2009	Louth	2-14 - 1-02	U.C.D.	Drogheda
	P Smith 2-02, D Clarke 0-04, A Reid 0-03, D Crilly 0-02, R Carroll, S Lennon, D Maguire 0-01 each.		M Ronaldson 1-01, J Fitzpatrick 0-01.

4 January 2009	Longford	2-12 - 1-07	A.I.T.	Ballymahon
	D Morgan 1-03, P Shanley 1-01, C Mimnagh, W Skelly 0-02 each, C Flynn, E Murtagh, S Doyle, K Mulligan 0-01 each.		B Smith 0-05, M Lundy 1-00, R Galligan 0-02.

4 January 2009	Dublin	0-15 - 1-07	Offaly	Tullamore
	J O'Brien, D Byrne 0-05 each, A Reilihan 0-03, D Lally, G Smith 0-01 each.	Report	T Deehan 1-01, R Guinan 0-03, N Smith, C Carroll, N Coughlan 0-01 each.

4 January 2009	Wicklow	2-10 - 1-08	Carlow	Blessington
	J McGrath 1-01, D Odlum 1-00, S Furlong 0-03, T Hannon 0-02, P McWalter, D Hayden, L Glynn, P Earls 0-01 each.		B Murphy 0-06, JJ Smith 1-00, M Carpenter, J Kavanagh 0-01 each.

4 January 2009	Kildare	1-12 - 0-09	Wexford	Newbridge
	J Kavanagh 1-02, M Conway, M O'Sullivan 0-03, R Sweeney 0-02, M Scanlon, M Hartnett 0-01 each.		J Murphy 0-05, B Brosnan, P Naughter, C Deely, S Cullen 0-01 each.

4 January 2009	Meath	1-17 - 0-07	Westmeath	Navan
	C Ward 1-05, G Reilly 0-03, S Bray, E Reilly, J Queeney, J Sheridan 0-02 each, D Bray 0-01.	Report	P Tormey 0-02, D McGuinness, P Bannon, E Leonard, D Bannon, P Kelly 0-01 each.

4 January 2009	D.C.U.	1-14 - 1-13	Laois	Portarlington
	C Mortimer 0-07, C Cregg 1-02, B Waters, B Sheridan, R Cullivan, M McElihinney, R Maguire 0-01 each.		D Brennan 1-02, MJ Tierney 0-04, B Sheehan 0-03, Z Tuohy 0-02, R Munnelly, P O'Leary 0-01 each.

4 January 2009	D.I.T.	0-18 - 2-06	Kilkenny	Freshford
	M Vaughan 0-08, E Gaffney 0-03, P Brogan, M Reilly 0-02 each, P O'Neill, B O'Loughlin, D Sheridan 0-01 each.		R Shore, M Nolan 1-00 each, C Roche 0-03, L Brennan 0-02, M Grace 0-01.

=== Quarter-finals ===
11 January 2009	Louth	4-12 - 0-05	Longford

11 January 2009	Wicklow	0-09 - 0-06	Dublin	Parnell Park
		Report

11 January 2009	Kildare	1-10 - 1-08	Meath

11 January 2009	D.C.U.	0-11 - 0-05	D.I.T.

=== Semi-finals ===
18 January 2009	Louth	2-19 - 1-10	Wicklow

18 January 2009	D.C.U.	2-08 - 0-11	Kildare

=== Final ===
25 January 2009	Louth	1-17 - 1-10	D.C.U.	Gaelic Grounds, Drogheda
	White 0-7 (1f, 2'45), Clarke 0-5 (2f), Andrews 1-0 (OG), G. Hoey 0-1, Carroll 0-1, D. Reid(0-1), Smith 0-1, Maguire 0-1		Johnston 0-5 (3f), B. Sheridan 0-4 (4f), Rafferty 1-0, Cullivan 0-1	Referee: J. Bannon (Longford)

GK	1	Stuart Reynolds (O'Connells)
RCB	2	John O'Brien (Seán O'Mahony's)
FB	3	Dessie Finnegan (St Patrick's)
LCB	4	Benny McArdle (St Patrick's Dromintee, Armagh)
RHB	5	Pádraig Rath (Dreadnots)
CHB	6	Mick Fanning (Naomh Máirtín)
LHB	7	Gerard Hoey (Geraldines)
MF	8	Ronan Carroll (St Mary's)
MF	9	Brian White (Cooley Kickhams)
RHF	10	Adrian Reid (Mattock Rangers)
CHF	11	Shane Lennon (Kilkerley Emmets) (c)
LHF	12	David Reid (Mattock Rangers)
RCF	13	JP Rooney (Naomh Máirtín)
FF	14	Derek Crilly (Dundalk Gaels)
LCF	15	Darren Clarke (St Mary's)
Substitutes:
	16	Páraic Smith (Dreadnots) for Adrian Reid
	17	Aaron Hoey (St Bride's) for Carroll
	18	Derek Maguire (Dundalk Young Irelands) for Rooney
	19	Kevin Rogers (Naomh Malachi) for Clarke

GK	1	Michael Boyle (Donegal)
RCB	2	Barry Watters (Cavan)
FB	3	Kieran Gavin (Westmeath)
LCB	4	Paddy Andrews (Dublin)
RHB	5	Dermot Sheridan (Cavan)
CHB	6	Ciarán Hughes (Monaghan)
LHB	7	Ronan Flanagan (Cavan)
MF	8	Ray Cullivan (Cavan)
MF	9	Kevin Reilly (Meath)
RHF	10	Cathal Cregg (Roscommon)
CHF	11	Brian Sheridan (Meath)
LHF	12	David Keenan (Roscommon)
RCF	13	Rory Maguire (Meath)
FF	14	Luke Sweetman (Dublin)
LCF	15	Martin McElroy (Monaghan)
Substitutes:
	16	Kevin Leahy (Dublin) for Flanagan
	17	Pauric Howard (Meath) for Brian Sheridan
	18	Seánie Johnston (Cavan) for Maguire
	19	Shane O'Rourke (Meath) for Sweetman
	20	David Kelly (Sligo) for Keenan
	21	Conor Rafferty (Louth) for Cregg

== O'Byrne Shield ==
The teams included in the quarter-finals of the O'Byrne Shield were Offaly, Carlow, Wexford, Laois, Kilkenny, UCD, Athlone IT and Westmeath. Laois were the eventual winners in the final against Carlow.

Quarter-finals; 11 January 2009		Semi-finals; 18 January 2009		Final; 25 January 2009
Laois	4-18
Kilkenny	1-04	Laois	2-14
Westmeath	2-13	Westmeath	1-09
Wexford	2-11			Laois	1-13
Carlow	2-11			Carlow	1-06
Offaly	0-13	Carlow	1-17
U.C.D.	0-12	U.C.D.	0-13
A.I.T.	0-08

== See also ==
- 2009 Dr McKenna Cup
