= 2006 National Football League (Ireland) =

Gaelic football competition

League details
- Dates: 4 February – 23 April 2006
- Teams: 32

League champions
- Winners: Kerry (18th win)
- Captain: Declan O'Sullivan
- Manager: Jack O'Connor

League runners-up
- Runners-up: Galway
- Captain: Pádraic Joyce
- Manager: Peter Ford

Other division winners
- Division 2: Louth

The 2006 National Football League, known for sponsorship reasons as the Allianz National Football League, was the 75th staging of the National Football League (NFL), an annual Gaelic football tournament for the Gaelic Athletic Association county teams of Ireland.

Kerry beat Galway in the final.

== Format ==
The top 16 teams are drawn into Divisions 1A and 1B. The other 16 teams are drawn into Divisions 2A and 2B. Each team plays all the other teams in its section once: either home or away. Teams earn 2 points for a win and 1 for a draw.

The top two teams in Divisions 2A and 2B progress to the Division 2 semi-finals and are promoted. The bottom two teams in Divisions 1A and 1B are relegated. The top two teams in Divisions 1A and 1B progress to the NFL semi-finals.

== Division One ==
=== Division One (A) table ===
Team	Pld	W	D	L	F	A	Diff	Pts	Notes
Mayo	7	5	1	1	5-95	7-77	+12	11	Advanced to NFL semi-final
Kerry	7	4	1	2	4-94	2-86	+14	9	Advanced to NFL semi-final
Tyrone	7	4	1	2	5-81	4-71	+13	9
Dublin	7	3	1	3	7-67	7-62	+5	7
Cork	7	3	0	4	3-55	1-71	-10	6
Fermanagh	7	3	0	4	5-69	5-81	-12	6
Offaly	7	2	1	4	8-69	8-81	-12	5	Relegated to Division Two of the 2007 NFL
Monaghan	7	1	1	5	4-77	7-78	-10	3	Relegated to Division Two of the 2007 NFL

=== Division One (B) table ===
Team	Pld	W	D	L	F	A	Diff	Pts	Notes
Laois	7	4	2	1	4-92	4-70	+22	10	Advanced to NFL semi-final
Galway	7	4	1	2	7-73	5-65	+14	9	Advanced to NFL semi-final
Derry	7	4	0	3	2-77	4-65	+6	9
Down	7	4	0	3	8-75	9-75	-3	7
Kildare	7	2	2	3	2-74	4-68	0	6
Armagh	7	3	0	4	10-73	6-79	-4	6
Meath	7	3	0	4	5-82	7-86	-10	6	Relegated to Division Two of the 2007 NFL
Wexford	7	1	1	5	7-64	6-92	-25	3	Relegated to Division Two of the 2007 NFL

=== Semi-finals ===
16 April 2006

Kerry	1-15 – 0-10	Laois

Fitzgerald Stadium, Killarney

=== Final ===
23 April 2006

Kerry	2-11 – 0-11	Galway

Croke Park, Dublin
Referee: Eugene Murtagh

== Division Two ==
=== Division Two (A) table ===
Team	Pld	W	D	L	F	A	Diff	Pts	Notes
Donegal	7	6	1	0	6-103	2-47	+68	13	Advanced to NFL Division 2 semi-final; promoted to Division One
Limerick	7	5	1	1	9-79	7-64	+21	11	Advanced to NFL Division 2 semi-final; promoted to Division One
Roscommon	7	5	0	2	7-81	2-66	+28	10
Leitrim	7	2	2	3	5-62	5-56	+6	6
Longford	7	2	2	3	9-80	13-73	-5	6
Clare	7	3	0	4	4-67	8-63	-8	6
Carlow	7	2	0	5	9-62	5-88	-14	4
London	7	0	0	7	4-29	11-104	-96	0

=== Division Two (B) table ===
Team	Pld	W	D	L	F	A	Diff	Pts	Notes
Louth	7	6	0	1	10-92	5-63	+44	12	Advanced to NFL Division 2 semi-final; promoted to Division One
Westmeath	7	5	0	2	8-86	4-67	+31	10	Advanced to NFL Division 2 semi-final; promoted to Division One
Cavan	7	5	0	2	3-88	8-69	+4	10
Tipperary	7	4	0	3	8-69	5-68	+10	8
Sligo	7	3	0	4	7-73	6-84	-8	6
Antrim	7	2	0	5	8-82	11-86	-13	4
Waterford	7	2	0	5	4-53	14-86	-63	4
Wicklow	7	1	0	6	9-67	4-87	-5	2

=== Semi-finals ===
16 April 2006

Donegal	0-14 – 1-09	Westmeath

Breffni Park, Cavan
Referee: Marty Duffy (Sligo)

16 April 2006

Louth	2-13 – 0-11	Limerick

St Conleth's Park, Newbridge
Referee: M. Hughes (Tyrone)

=== Final ===
23 April 2006

Donegal	0-17 – 3-08	Louth

Breffni Park, Cavan
Referee: P. McGovern (Galway)

=== Final (Replay) ===
30 April 2006

Donegal	1–09–1–12	Louth
Doherty (1-3, 1pen, 2f) A. Sweeney (0-3,2f), Monaghan (0-1), Dunnion (0-1), Toye (0-1)		Stanfield (1-2, 1f), Clarke (0-4, 1f), Hoey (0-2), O'Brien (0-1), Farrelly (0-1), Keenan (0-1), Grimes (0-1f)

Breffni Park, Cavan
Referee: Marty Duffy (Sligo)

GK	1	Paul Durcan (Four Masters)
RCB	2	Raymond Sweeney (Dungloe)
FB	3	Paddy Campbell (Naomh Conaill)
LCB	4	Karl Lacey (Four Masters)
RHB	5	Damien Diver (Ardara)
CHB	6	Barry Monaghan (Four Masters)
LHB	7	Barry Dunnion (Four Masters)
MF	8	Brendan Boyle (Ardara)
MF	9	Neil Gallagher (Glenswilly)
RHF	10	Christy Toye (St Michael's) (c)
CHF	11	Ciarán Bonner (Glenswilly)
LHF	12	Rory Kavanagh (St Eunan's)
RCF	13	Adrian Sweeney (Dungloe)
FF	14	James Gallagher (Ghaoth Dobhair)
LCF	15	Michael Doherty (Four Masters)
Substitutes:
	16	Stephen McDermott (Glenfin) for Boyle
	17	Michael Hegarty (Kilcar) for James Gallagher
	18	Frank McGlynn (Glenfin) for Monaghan
	19	Conall Dunne (St Eunan's) for Bonner

GK	1	Stuart Reynolds (O'Connells)
RCB	2	David Brennan (Mattock Rangers)
FB	3	Colin Goss (St Patrick's)
LCB	4	Jamie Carr (Newtown Blues)
RHB	5	John O'Brien (Seán O'Mahony's)
CHB	6	Peter McGinnity (Dundalk Gaels)
LHB	7	John Neary (Geraldines)
MF	8	Martin Farrelly (St Joseph's) (c)
MF	9	Paddy Keenan (St Patrick's)
RHF	10	Christy Grimes (Mattock Rangers)
CHF	11	Mark Brennan (Mattock Rangers)
LHF	12	Mark Stanfield (Killeavy, Armagh)
RCF	13	JP Rooney (Naomh Máirtín)
FF	14	Aaron Hoey (St Bride's)
LCF	15	Darren Clarke (St Mary's)
Substitutes:
	16	Ronan Carroll (St Mary's) for Grimes
