= Jamie Carr =

Irish Gaelic footballer

Personal information
- Born: 1982 (age 43–44)

Sport
- Sport: Gaelic football
- Position: Corner-Back
Clubs
- Years: Club
- Newtown Blues; St Sylvester's (Dublin)
Inter-county
- Years: County
- 2004-2012: Louth

Jamie Carr (born 1982) is a retired Irish Gaelic footballer who played in defence for Newtown Blues, St Sylvester's and the Louth senior team.

When holidaying in the US, he also lined out for Donegal Boston.

== Honours ==
County

- National Football League Division 2 (1): 2006
- National Football League Division 3 (1): 2011
- Tommy Murphy Cup (1): 2006
- Leinster Junior Football Championship (1): 2010
- Owen Treacy Cup (1): 2006

Club

- Louth Senior Football Championship (2): 2001, 2013
- Cardinal O'Donnell Cup (1): 2005
- Paddy Sheelan Cup (1): 2007
- Dublin Senior Football League (1): 2010
