= 2005 All-Ireland Junior Football Championship =

Football championship

All Ireland Champions
- Winners: Cork
- Captain: Michael Prout
- Manager: Mossie Barrett

All Ireland Runners-up
- Runners-up: Meath
- Captain: Stephen Dillon
- Manager: Dessie Hamilton

Provincial Champions
- Munster: Cork
- Leinster: Meath
- Ulster: Not Played
- Connacht: Sligo

The 2005 All-Ireland Junior Football Championship was the 75th staging of the competition since its establishment by the Gaelic Athletic Association in 1912.

Traditionally the four provincial championship winners face each other at the All-Ireland semi-final stage.

As the Ulster GAA council did not hold a provincial championship, the fourth semi-final spot was filled by overseas representatives London.

Cork's victory in the final against Meath on 30 July, was the county's 13th in the history of the All-Ireland Junior Football Championship.

== Results ==
=== Munster Junior Football Championship ===
13 July 2005 Final	Cork	2-13 - 0-08	Kerry	Páirc Uí Rinn, Cork
	D. Goulding 0-5 (2f), P. Dunlea 0-4 (2f), A. O'Connor, G. Spillane 1-0 each, J. Russell 0-2, M. Prout, J. Buckley 0-1 each		Darren O'Sullivan 0-3 (2f), M. Corridan, D. Geaney, M. Murphy, K. Foley, Declan O'Sullivan 0-1 each	Referee: B. Tyrrell (Tipperary)

=== Leinster Junior Football Championship ===
6 July 2005 Final	Meath	1-09 - 0-05	Louth	Gaelic Grounds, Drogheda
	R. Maguire 1-1, B. Lynch (1f), I. McManus (2f) 0-2 each, S. Dillon, G. McCullagh, J.L. McGee, C. Brennan 0-1 each		D. Reid (2f), C. Kelly (1f) 0-2 each, C. Grimes 0-1	Referee: G. McCormack (Dublin)

GK	1	John Curry (Ballinabrackey)
RCB	2	Trevor Bannon (Ballinabrackey)
FB	3	Ciarán McLoughlin (Wolfe Tones)
LCB	4	Paddy Nugent (Carnaross)
RHB	5	Barry Kieran (Meath Hill)
CHB	6	John Donoghue (Moynalvey)
LHB	7	Gordon Hynes (Duleek)
MF	8	Jim Gallagher (Gaeil Colmcille)
MF	9	Stephen Dillon (Syddan) (c)
RHF	10	Peter Curran (Duleek)
CHF	11	Ian McManus (Curraha)
LHF	12	Ger McCullagh (Ratoath)
RCF	13	Rory Maguire (Longwood)
FF	14	Barry Lynch (Kilmainham)
LCF	15	John L. McGee (Carnaross)
Substitutes:
	16	Conor Brennan (Dunsany) for Gallagher
	17	Wayne Reilly (Drumconrath) for McManus
	18	Keith Hamilton (Boardsmill) for Curran
	19	John Bruton (Kilbride) for McGee
	20	Ian Mullen (St Colmcille's) for Kieran
Manager:
Dessie Hamilton

GK	1	Seán Connor (St Patrick's)
RCB	2	Dessie Finnegan (St Patrick's)
FB	3	Derek Shevlin (Dreadnots)
LCB	4	Andrew Tinley (St Nicholas)
RHB	5	Trevor Baylon (Westerns)
CHB	6	Owen Zamboglou (St Patrick's)
LHB	7	Ray Rooney (Dundalk Gaels)
MF	8	Paul Kirk (St Bride's)
MF	9	Mick Fanning (Naomh Máirtín)
RHF	10	Ray Kelly (St Bride's)
CHF	11	Cormac Malone (Na Piarsaigh)
LHF	12	David Boylan (Oliver Plunketts)
RCF	13	Damien Connor (St Patrick's)
FF	14	Colin Kelly (Dreadnots)
LCF	15	David Reid (Mattock Rangers)
Substitutes:
	16	David Bracken (Glen Emmets) for C. Kelly
	17	Mark McGeown (Clan na Gael) for Connor
	18	Christy Grimes (Mattock Rangers) for Boylan
	19	Colm McGuinness (Kilkerley Emmets) for Malone
	20	John O'Brien (Seán O'Mahony's) for Kirk
Manager:
Val Andrews

=== Connacht Junior Football Championship ===
13 May 2005 Final	Sligo	0-12 - 0-11	Mayo	Fr. O'Hara Memorial Park, Charlestown
				Referee: G. Kinneavy (Galway)

=== All-Ireland Semi-Finals ===
16 July 2005	Meath	1-18 - 0-06	London	Páirc Tailteann, Navan
	R. Maguire 1-4, P. Curran, J.L. McGee 0-3 each, G. McCullagh, I. McManus, B. Lynch 0-2 each, W. Reilly, I. Mullen 0-1 each		N. Clinton 0-4, A. Hanley, P. Fitzmaurice 0-1 each	Referee: M. Higgins (Fermanagh)

22 July 2005	Cork	0-10 - 0-07	Sligo	St Brendan's Park, Birr
	D. Goulding 0-6 (2f), S. Hayes 0-2, P. Dunlea (1f), S. O'Sullivan 0-1 each		E. Cawley (1f), L. Óg Gormley (1f), 0-2 each, F. Horan, B. O'Reilly, D. Davey 0-1 each	Referee: D. Fahy Longford)

=== All-Ireland Final ===
30 July 2005	Cork	0-10 - 1-04	Meath	O'Moore Park, Portlaoise
	D. Goulding 0-5 (3f, 1'45), D. O'Connor 0-2 (1f), J. Russell, J. Buckley, V. Hurley 0-1 each		R. Maguire 1-0, I. McManus 0-2 (2f), P. Curran, B. Lynch (1f) 0-1 each	Referee: P. Carney (Roscommon)
