= Donagh Wiseman =

Irish Gaelic footballer

Personal information
- Native name: Donagh Mac Uidheas (Irish)
- Born: 1977 Castletownbere, County Cork, Ireland

Sport
- Sport: Gaelic football
- Position: Full-back
Clubs
- Years: Club
- Castletownbere → Beara
Club titles
- Cork titles: 1
College
- Years: College
- University College Cork
College titles
- Sigerson titles: 0
Inter-county
Years	County	Apps (scores)
1998-2000	Cork	2 (0-00)
Inter-county titles
- Munster titles: 0
- All-Irelands: 0
- NFL: 1
- All Stars: 0

Donagh Wiseman (born 1977) is an Irish retired Gaelic footballer. At club level, he played with Castletownbere, divisional side Beara and at inter-county level with the Cork senior football team.

== Playing career ==
Wiseman played Gaelic football as a student at Beara Community School. He was part of the school team that beat Davitt College by 2-06 to 0-08 to win the All-Ireland Vocational Schools SAFC title in 1994. Wiseman was also selected for the Cork vocational schools' team. He later studied at University College Cork and lined out in the Sigerson Cup.

At club level, Wiseman began his career at juvenile and underage levels with Castletownbere before progressing to adult level. He also earned selection to the Beara divisional team and was at full-back when they beat Castlehaven by 1-10 to 1-07 to win the Cork SFC title in 1997. Wiseman added a Cork IFC medal to his collection in 2012, following Castletownbere's win over Éire Óg in the final.

At inter-county level, Wiseman first played for Cork at minor level in 1995. He progressed to the under-21 team but ended his underage career without silverware. Wiseman joined the senior team in 1998. He was part of the team that won the National Football League title in 1999.

Wiseman later joined Cork's junior team and won an All-Ireland JFC medal after a 0-10 to 1-04 win over Meath in the 2005 All-Ireland junior final. He collected a second winners' medal in that grade when Cork's juniors beat Wexford to claim the All-Ireland JFC title in 2007.

== Coaching career ==
Wiseman spent a period as a statistician with the Cork senior team before later becoming involved in Cork's underage development squads. He was coach of the Canovee team that won the Cork JAFC title in 2023.

== Honours ==
=== Player ===
Beara Community School

- All-Ireland Vocational Schools Senior Football Championship: 1994
- Munster Vocational Schools Senior Football Championship: 1994

Castletownbere

- Cork Intermediate Football Championship: 2012

Beara

- Cork Senior Football Championship: 1997

Cork

- National Football League: 1998–99
- All-Ireland Junior Football Championship: 2005, 2007
- Munster Junior Football Championship: 2005, 2007

=== Coach ===
Canovee

- Cork Junior A Football Championship: 2023
- Mid Cork Junior A Football Championship: 2023
