= Adrian Reid =

Adrian Reid may refer to:

- Adrian Reid (Gaelic footballer), (born 1986/1987)
- Adrian Reid (Jamaican footballer), (born 1985)
