= 2012 National Football League (Ireland) =

Gaelic football competition

League details
- Dates: 4 February – 29 April 2012
- Teams: 33

League champions
- Winners: Cork (8th win)
- Captain: Graham Canty
- Manager: Conor Counihan

League runners-up
- Runners-up: Mayo
- Captain: Andy Moran
- Manager: James Horan

Other division winners
- Division 2: Kildare
- Division 3: Longford
- Division 4: Wicklow

The 2012 National Football League known for sponsorship reasons as the Allianz National Football League was the 81st staging of the National Football League (NFL), an annual Gaelic football tournament for the Gaelic Athletic Association county teams of Ireland. The League began on Saturday 4 February 2012. Thirty-two Gaelic football county teams from the island of Ireland, plus London, participated.

On 29 April, Cork defeated Mayo by 2-10 to 0-11 to win their eight league title and their third in a row.

== Format ==
=== League structure ===
The 2012 format of the National Football League was a system of four divisions. The top three divisions consisted of 8 teams, and Division 4 contained nine teams. Each team played every other team in its division once, either home or away. 2 points were awarded for a win and 1 for a draw.

=== Tie-breaker ===
If only two teams were level on points:

- The team that won the head-to-head match was ranked first
- If this game was a draw, points difference (total scored minus total conceded in all games) was used to rank the teams
- If points difference was identical, total scored was used to rank the teams
- If still identical, a play-off was required

If three or more teams were level on points, points difference was used to rank the teams.

=== Finals, promotions and relegations ===
The top four teams in Division 1 contested the 2012 NFL semi-finals (first played fourth and second played third) and final. The top two teams in divisions 2, 3 and 4 were promoted, and contested the finals of their respective divisions. The bottom two teams in divisions 1, 2 and 3 were relegated.

== Division 1 ==
=== Table ===
Compete in Division 1 semi-finals Automatic relegation to Division 2

Team	Pld	W	D	L	F	A	Diff	Pts
Kerry	7	5	1	1	4-99	5-71	25	11
Cork	7	4	1	2	8-75	1-75	21	9
Down	7	4	0	3	4-83	6-79	-2	8
Mayo	7	3	1	3	4-88	2-83	11	7
Dublin	7	3	0	4	7-88	4-93	4	6
Donegal	7	3	0	4	5-73	8-74	-10	6
Armagh	7	2	1	4	5-73	7-92	-25	5
Laois	7	2	0	5	5-74	9-86	-24	4

^{1}Dublin are placed ahead of Donegal because they won the head-to-head game between the teams (2-16 to 0-13).

=== Rounds 1 to 7 ===
04/02/12; Round 1	Down	1-10 – 1-9	Donegal	Páirc Esler, Newry; Referee: J McQuillan
04/02/12; Round 1	L Doyle (1-4), A Brannigan (0-2), B Coulter (0-1), C Garvey (0-1), A Carr (0-1), D Gordon (0-1)	Report	M McElhinney (1-0), M McHugh (0-2), P McBrearty (0-2), S Griffin (0-2), D Molloy (0-1), K Lacey (0-1), A Thompson (0-1)	Páirc Esler, Newry; Referee: J McQuillan

04/02/12; Round 1	Dublin	0-11 – 1-14	Kerry	Croke Park, Dublin; Referee: M. Deegan
04/02/12; Round 1	T Quinn (0-4), K McMenamin (0-3), S Cluxton (0-2), B Cullen (0-1), D Connolly (0-1)	Report	B Sheehan (0-8), BJ Keane (0-3), J O'Donoghue (0-3), D O'Sullivan (1-0)	Croke Park, Dublin; Referee: M. Deegan

04/02/12; Round 1	Laois	0-8 – 1-11	Mayo	O'Moore Park, Portlaoise; Referee: R. Hickey
04/02/12; Round 1	D Conway (0-4), R Munnelly (0-2), D Strong (0-1), J O'Loughlin (0-1)	Report	C Mortimer (0-5), A Freeman (1-2), E Varley (0-2), A Dillon (0-1), B Moran (0-1)	O'Moore Park, Portlaoise; Referee: R. Hickey

05/02/12; Round 1	Armagh	0-10 – 1-7	Cork	Athletic Grounds, Armagh; Attendance: 3,000; Referee: S. Doyle
05/02/12; Round 1	E McVerry (0-4), A Forker (0-3), B Mallon (0-1), M Mackin (0-1), P Carvill (0-1)	Report	M Collins (0-3), D O'Connor (0-2), F Goold (0-1), S Kiely (0-1)	Athletic Grounds, Armagh; Attendance: 3,000; Referee: S. Doyle

11/02/12; Round 2	Kerry	0-10 – 2-8	Armagh	Austin Stack Park, Tralee; Referee: M. Condron
11/02/12; Round 2	B Sheehan (0-6), Declan O'Sullivan (0-1), S O'Sullivan (0-1)	Report	A Forker (0-4), B Mallon (1-0), J Kingham (1-0), M Machin (0-2), A Duffy (0-1), C Waters (0-1)	Austin Stack Park, Tralee; Referee: M. Condron

12/02/12; Round 2	Donegal	2-6 – 2-9	Laois	O'Donnell Park, Letterkenny; Referee: M. Duffy
12/02/12; Round 2	P McBrearty (0-4), A Thompson (1-0), N Gallagher (1-0), R Kavanagh (0-2)	Report	P Clancy (1-1), D Conway (0-3), R Munnelly (0-3), P Cahillane (1-0), C Begley (0-1), D Strong (0-1)	O'Donnell Park, Letterkenny; Referee: M. Duffy

12/02/12; Round 2	Cork	4-11 – 0-10	Down	Páirc Uí Rinn, Cork; Referee: R. Hickey
12/02/12; Round 2	P Kelly (3-0), D O'Connor (1-4), B O'Driscoll (0-2), A O'Connor (0-1), F Goold (0-1), M Collins (0-1), M Shields (0-1), P O'Neill (0-1)	Report	A Carr (0-5), L Doyle (0-2), A Branigan (0-1), C Laverty (0-1), D Gordon (0-1)	Páirc Uí Rinn, Cork; Referee: R. Hickey

03/03/12; Round 3	Armagh	0-11 – 1-14	Mayo	Athletic Grounds, Armagh; Referee: M Deegan
03/03/12; Round 3	A Forker (0-6), B Mallon (0-2), C Watters (0-2), G McParland (0-1)	Report	A Freeman (0-5), C Mortimer (0-4), E Varley (0-4), A Moran (1-0), L Keegan (0-1)	Athletic Grounds, Armagh; Referee: M Deegan

03/03/12; Round 3	Laois	1-9 – 1-14	Dublin	O'Moore Park, Portlaoise; Referee: D Coldrick
03/03/12; Round 3	R Munnelly (1-3), P Cahillane (0-2), C Begley (0-1), P Clancy (0-1)	Report	E O'Gara (1-5), D Connolly (0-5), T Quinn (0-2), A Brogan (0-1), P Flynn (0-1)	O'Moore Park, Portlaoise; Referee: D Coldrick

04/03/12; Round 3	Donegal	1-7 – 0-6	Cork	MacCumhail Park, Ballybofey; Referee: P O'Sullivan
04/03/12; Round 3	M Murphy (1-3), C McFadden (0-1), F McGlynn (0-1), K Lacey (0-1), M O'Reilly (0-1)	Report	D O'Connor (0-2), A Walsh (0-1), C O'Neill (0-1), M Collins (0-1), P Kelly (0-1)	MacCumhail Park, Ballybofey; Referee: P O'Sullivan

04/03/12; Round 3	Down	0-8 – 0-14	Kerry	Páirc Esler, Newry; Referee: D Brazil
04/03/12; Round 3	M Poland (0-4), D Gordon (0-2), A McConville (0-1), D Hughes (0-1)	Report	B Sheehan (0-6), BJ Keane (0-4), Declan O'Sullivan (0-3), P Curtin (0-1)	Páirc Esler, Newry; Referee: D Brazil

10/03/12; Round 4	Cork	2-14 – 0-10	Laois	Páirc Uí Rinn, Cork; Referee: Cormac Reilly
10/03/12; Round 4	C O'Neill (2-3), A Walsh (0-3), F Gould (0-3), D O'Connor (0-2), E Cotter (0-1), P Kerrigan (0-1), P Kissane (0-1)	Report	MJ Tierney (0-4), J O'Loughlin (0-2), R Munnelly (0-2), C Begley (0-1), P Cahillane (0-1)	Páirc Uí Rinn, Cork; Referee: Cormac Reilly

11/03/12; Round 4	Kerry	2-16 – 1-8	Donegal	Fitzgerald Stadium, Killarney; Referee: S Doyle
11/03/12; Round 4	P Curtin (1-1), A Maher (0-2), K Donaghy (0-2), B McGuire (0-1), BJ Keane (0-1), P Crowley (0-1), P Galvin (0-1)	Report	M Murphy (1-5), A Thompson (0-1), P McBrearty (0-1), R Kavanagh (0-1)	Fitzgerald Stadium, Killarney; Referee: S Doyle

11/03/12; Round 4	Mayo	0-11 – 1-13	Down	MacHale Park, Castlebar; Referee: B Cassidy
11/03/12; Round 4	C Mortimer (0-6), A Dillon (0-2), A Freeman (0-2), A Moran (0-1)	Report	A Carr (0-5), C Maginn (1-1), A Rogers (0-3), B Coulter (0-2), D Hughes (0-1), K Duffin (0-1)	MacHale Park, Castlebar; Referee: B Cassidy

11/03/12; Round 4	Dublin	4-17 – 1-10	Armagh	Croke Park, Dublin; Referee: M Collins
11/03/12; Round 4	D Connolly (3-3), T Quinn (1-3), E O'Gara (0-3), J Cooper (0-2), P Flynn (0-2), A Brogan (0-1), E Fennell (0-1), J McCarthy (0-1), MD Macauley (0-1)	Report	B Mallon (0-4), C Rafferty (1-1), A Forker (0-2), C Watters (0-1)	Croke Park, Dublin; Referee: M Collins

18/03/12; Round 5	Cork	0-11 – 0-13	Kerry	Páirc Uí Chaoimh, Cork; Referee: M Deegan
18/03/12; Round 5	D O'Connor (0-5), A Walsh (0-2), E Cotter (0-1), F Goold (0-1), G Canty (0-1), M Collins (0-1)	Report	B Sheehan (0-4), Declan O'Sullivan (0-4), A Maher (0-1), Darran O'Sullivan (0-1), K Donaghy (0-1), P Galvin (0-1)	Páirc Uí Chaoimh, Cork; Referee: M Deegan

18/03/12; Round 5	Down	0-15 – 0-10	Dublin	Páirc Esler, Newry; Referee: C Reilly
18/03/12; Round 5	A Carr (0-5), A Rogers (0-2), K McKernan (0-2), M Poland (0-2), B Coulter (0-1), C Laverty (0-1), D Hughes (0-1), N McParland (0-1)	Report	K McManamon (1-1), D Connolly (0-3), A Brogan (0-2), E Fennell (0-1), S Cluxton (0-1)	Páirc Esler, Newry; Referee: C Reilly

18/03/12; Round 5	Laois	1-15 – 1-10	Armagh	O'Moore Park, Portlaoise; Referee: M Duffy
18/03/12; Round 5	P Cahillane (1-1), C Begley (0-3), R Munnelly (0-2), B Sheehan (0-1), C Kelly (0-1), D O'Connor (0-1), D Strong (0-1), K Meaney (0-1), M Timmons (0-1)	Report	C Rafferty (1-1), A Forker (0-2), B Mallon (0-2), A Duffy (0-1), G McParland (0-1), J Kingham (0-1), J Lavery (0-1), M O'Rourke (0-1)	O'Moore Park, Portlaoise; Referee: M Duffy

18/03/12; Round 5	Donegal	0-17 – 1-7	Mayo	Fr Tierney Park, Ballyshannon; Referee: Marty Duffy
18/03/12; Round 5	C McFadden (0-7), M Murphy (0-5), P McBrearty (0-2), K Lacey (0-1), L McLoone (0-1), M McHugh (0-1)	Report	C Mortimer (0-3), E Varley (1-0), A Dillon (0-1), D Clarke (0-1), K McLoughlin (0-1), M Conroy (0-1)	Fr Tierney Park, Ballyshannon; Referee: Marty Duffy

24/03/12; Round 6	Dublin	2-16 – 0-13	Donegal	Croke Park, Dublin; Referee: E Kinsella
24/03/12; Round 6	D Connolly (1-3), B Cullen (1-1), K McManamon (0-3), A Brogan (0-1), D Kelly (0-1), D Rock (0-1), E Fennell (0-1), J Cooper (0-1), MD Macauley (0-1), P Flynn (0-1), S Cluxton (0-1), T Quinn (0-1)	Report	M Murphy (0-6), A Thompson (0-1), C Toye (0-1), L McLoone (0-1), M McElhinney (0-1), N McGee (0-1), P McBrearty (0-1)	Croke Park, Dublin; Referee: E Kinsella

24/03/12; Round 6	Armagh	1-14 – 0-16	Down	Athletic Grounds, Armagh; Referee: D Coldrick
24/03/12; Round 6	M Stevenson (0-6), B Mallon (1-3), C McKeever (0-1), C Rafferty (0-1), D McKenna (0-1), F Moriarty (0-1), P Carragher (0-1)	Report	A Carr (0-6), A Rogers (0-2), D Hughes (0-2), E McCartan (0-2), M Poland (0-2), D Gordon (0-1), K McKernan (0-1)	Athletic Grounds, Armagh; Referee: D Coldrick

25/03/12; Round 6	Mayo	0-13 – 0-14	Cork	MacHale Park, Castlebar; Referee: J McQuillan
25/03/12; Round 6	C Mortimer (0-3), A Dillon (0-2), A Moran (0-2), M Conroy (0-2), A Freeman (0-1), D Vaughan (0-1), J Doherty (0-1), K McLoughlin (0-1)	Report	D O'Connor (0-6), P Kelly (0-2), A Walsh (0-1), B O'Driscoll (0-1), C O'Neill (0-1), S Kiely (0-1)	MacHale Park, Castlebar; Referee: J McQuillan

25/03/12; Round 6	Kerry	0-20 – 1-13	Laois	Fitzgerald Stadium, Killarney; Referee: M Duffy
25/03/12; Round 6	B Sheehan (0-6), P Curtin (0-4), Declan O'Sullivan (0-3), Darran O'Sullivan (0-2), A Maher (0-1), A O'Mahony (0-1), BJ Keane (0-1), J Buckley (0-1), K O'Leary (0-1)	Report	C Begley (1-1), R Munnelly (0-3), G Walsh (0-2), J O'Loughlin (0-2), B Quigley (0-1), D O'Connor (0-1), D Strong (0-1), K Meaney (0-1), P O'Leary (0-1)	Fitzgerald Stadium, Killarney; Referee: M Duffy

31/03/12; Round 2 refixture	Mayo	0-20 – 0-8	Dublin	MacHale Park, Castlebar; Attendance: 10,153; Referee: Michael Duffy (Sligo)
31/03/12; Round 2 refixture	C Mortimer (0-8), A Dillon (0-4), M Conroy (0-4), D Vaughan (0-2), A O'Shea (0-1), B Moran (0-1)	Report	B Cullen (0-2), T Quinn (0-2), D Connolly (0-1), D Rock (0-1), G Brennan (0-1), P Andrews (0-1)	MacHale Park, Castlebar; Attendance: 10,153; Referee: Michael Duffy (Sligo)

08/04/12; Round 7	Laois	0-10 – 2-11	Down	O'Moore Park, Portlaoise; Referee: S Doyle
08/04/12; Round 7	G Walsh (0-2), B Quigley (0-1), C Begley (0-1), C Boyle (0-1), C Kelly (0-1), D Conway (0-1), D O'Connor (0-1), P Cahillane (0-1), R Munnelly (0-1)	Report	B Coulter (1-1), A McConville (0-3), C Laverty (1-0), A Carr (0-2), K Quinn (0-2), A Rogers (0-1), C Garvey (0-1), M Poland (0-1)	O'Moore Park, Portlaoise; Referee: S Doyle

08/04/12; Round 7	Kerry	1-12 – 1-12	Mayo	Austin Stack Park, Tralee; Referee: M Condon
08/04/12; Round 7	B Sheehan (1-6), P Curtin (0-3), C Cooper (0-2), P Galvin (0-1)	Report	C O'Connor (0-6), J Doherty (1-1), K McLoughlin (0-2), A Dillon (0-1), A Moran (0-1), D Clarke (0-1)	Austin Stack Park, Tralee; Referee: M Condon

08/04/12; Round 7	Cork	1-12 – 0-12	Dublin	Páirc Uí Chaoimh, Cork; Referee: D Coldrick
08/04/12; Round 7	C O'Neill (0-4), A Walsh (1-1), D O'Connor (0-2), P Kerrigan (0-2), P O'Neill (0-2), F Goold (0-1)	Report	D Connolly (0-5), B Cullen (0-2), K McManamon (0-2), MD MacAuley (0-2), E Fennell (0-1)	Páirc Uí Chaoimh, Cork; Referee: D Coldrick

08/04/12; Round 7	Donegal	0-13 – 0-10	Armagh	MacCumhail Park, Ballybofey; Referee: C Reilly
08/04/12; Round 7	C McFadden (0-5), R Kavanagh (0-2), A Hanlon (0-1), D Molloy (0-1), F McGlynn (0-1), L McLoone (0-1), M McElhinney (0-1), M O'Reilly (0-1)	Report	M Stevenson (0-7), B Donaghy (0-1), B Mallon (0-1), C McKeever (0-1)	MacCumhail Park, Ballybofey; Referee: C Reilly

=== Division 1 Semi-finals ===
15/04/12; 14:00	Mayo	2-15 – 1-17 (A.E.T.)	Kerry	Croke Park, Dublin; Attendance: 11,342^{1} Referee: E Kinsella
15/04/12; 14:00	C Mortimer (0-7), C Boyle (1-1), P Harte (1-0), A Dillon (0-2), C O'Connor (0-2), A Moran (0-1), K Higgins (0-1), R Feeney (0-1)	Report	B Sheehan (0-6), C Cooper (0-4), J O'Donoghue (1-0), BJ Keane (0-2), A Maher (0-1), Darran O'Sullivan (0-1), K O'Leary (0-1), P Curtin (0-1), P Galvin (0-1)	Croke Park, Dublin; Attendance: 11,342^{1} Referee: E Kinsella

15/04/12; 16:00	Cork	2-17 – 1-12	Down	Croke Park, Dublin; Attendance: 11,342^{1} Referee: Michael Duffy
15/04/12; 16:00	C O'Neill (1-6), A O'Connor (1-1), P Kerrigan (0-3), P O'Neill (0-2), A Walsh (0-1), B O'Driscoll (0-1), D Goulding (0-1), D O'Connor (0-1), N O'Leary (0-1)	Report	A Carr (1-2), B Coulter (0-3), C Laverty (0-3), A McConville (0-1), B McArdle (0-1), M Poland (0-1), P Turley (0-1)	Croke Park, Dublin; Attendance: 11,342^{1} Referee: Michael Duffy

^{1}Attendance figure is total of both semi-finals played consecutively

=== Division 1 final ===
29/04/12; 16:00	Cork	2-10 – 0-11	Mayo	Croke Park, Dublin; Attendance: 22,827^{2} Referee: M Deegan
29/04/12; 16:00	A Walsh (1-0), C O'Neill (1-0), D O'Connor (0-2), F Goold (0-2), P O'Neill (0-2), A O'Connor (0-1), D Goulding (0-1), G Canty (0-1), P Kelly (0-1)	Report	C O'Connor (0-6), A Moran (0-1), D Vaughan (0-1), K Higgins (0-1), K McLoughlin (0-1), C Mortimer (0-1)	Croke Park, Dublin; Attendance: 22,827^{2} Referee: M Deegan

^{2}Attendance figure is total of the Division 1 and Division 2 finals played consecutively

== Division 2 ==
=== Table ===
Compete in Division 2 final and automatic promotion to Division 1 Automatic relegation to Division 3

Team	Pld	W	D	L	F	A	Diff	Pts
Tyrone	7	7	0	0	11-92	1-66	56	14
Kildare	7	4	1	2	8-105	7-94	14	9
Galway	7	3	2	2	4-93	5-85	5	8
Louth	7	2	2	3	4-98	9-93	-10	6
Westmeath	7	3	0	4	4-79	6-97	-24	6
Derry	7	2	1	4	3-84	7-92	-20	5
Meath	7	2	0	5	5-77	5-83	-6	4
Monaghan	7	2	0	5	6-87	5-105	-15	4

^{1}Louth are placed ahead of Westmeath because they won the head-to-head game between the teams (0-12 to 1-06).

^{2}Meath are placed ahead of Monaghan because they won the head-to-head game between the teams (1-15 to 1-09).

=== Rounds 1 to 7 ===
04/02/12; Round 1	Kildare	0-12 – 2-11	Tyrone	Croke Park, Dublin; Referee: M. Duffy
04/02/12; Round 1	M Conway (0-6), E O'Flaherty (0-2), P O'Neill (0-2), J Doyle (0-1), P Kelly (0-1)	Report	Stephen O'Neill (0-5), O Mulligan (0-3), M Penrose (1-0), P Harte (1-0), D McCaul (0-1), Mark Donnelly (0-1), R O'Neill (0-1)	Croke Park, Dublin; Referee: M. Duffy

04/02/12; Round 1	Meath	1-15 – 1-9	Monaghan	Páirc Tailteann, Navan; Referee: P. Hughes
04/02/12; Round 1	S Bray (0-6), G Reilly (0-3), S McAnarney (1-0), C Ward (0-2), P Gilsenan (0-2), B Meade (0-1)	Report	J Turley (1-0), D Hughes (0-2), E Duffy (0-2), P Finlay (0-2), D Morgan (0-1), N McAdam (0-1), V Corey (0-1)	Páirc Tailteann, Navan; Referee: P. Hughes

05/02/12; Round 1	Louth	0-12 – 1-6	Westmeath	Haggardstown GAA Ground, Haggardstown; Referee: B. Cassidy
05/02/12; Round 1	D Clarke (0-4), P Keenan (0-4), R Carroll (0-2), A Hoey (0-1), L Shevlin (0-1)	Report	C McCormack (1-1), A Giles (0-2), K Martin (0-2), T English (0-1)	Haggardstown GAA Ground, Haggardstown; Referee: B. Cassidy

05/02/12; Round 1	Derry	1-11 – 1-15	Galway	Celtic Park, Derry; Referee: M. Deegan
05/02/12; Round 1	C O'Boyle (1-4), C Gilligan (0-2), B McGoldrick (0-1), C McKaigue (0-1), D Devlin (0-1), M Lynch (0-1), Paddy Bradley (0-1)	Report	M Martin (0-5), N Joyce (0-5), G Bradshaw (1-1), M Hehir (0-3), C Kenny (0-1)	Celtic Park, Derry; Referee: M. Deegan

12/02/12; Round 2	Galway	1-8 – 0-11	Louth	Pearse Stadium, Salthill; Referee: D. Fahy
12/02/12; Round 2	D Cummins (1-1), G Bradshaw (0-2), M Martin (0-2), N Joyce (0-1), P Conroy (0-1), T Flynn (0-1)	Report	D Clarke (0-3), A McDonnell (0-1), A Reid (0-1), D Crilly (0-1), E O'Connor (0-1), J McEneaney (0-1), M Brennan (0-1), P Keenan (0-1), R Carroll (0-1)	Pearse Stadium, Salthill; Referee: D. Fahy

12/02/12; Round 2	Westmeath	0-5 – 0-17	Meath	Cusack Park, Mullingar; Referee: E. Kinsella
12/02/12; Round 2	K Martin (0-2), A Giles (0-1), C McCormack (0-1), M Ennis (0-1)	Report	S Bray (0-5), G Reilly (0-3), B Meade (0-2), C Ward (0-2), C Lenehan (0-1), C McGuinness (0-1), M Ward (0-1), S Kenny (0-1), S McAnarney (0-1)	Cusack Park, Mullingar; Referee: E. Kinsella

12/02/12; Round 2	Monaghan	0-17 – 0-12	Kildare	St Tiernach's Park, Clones; Referee: M. Duffy
12/02/12; Round 2	P Finlay (0-7), K Hughes (0-2), M McKenna (0-2), O Duffy (0-2), D Clerkin (0-1), D Malone (0-1), David Hughes (0-1), J Turley (0-1)	Report	E O'Flaherty (0-5), E Callaghan (0-3), M Conway (0-3), P Fogarty (0-1)	St Tiernach's Park, Clones; Referee: M. Duffy

12/02/12; Round 2	Tyrone	2-15 – 0-9	Derry	Healy Park, Omagh; Referee: M. Deegan
12/02/12; Round 2	M Murphy (1-2), P Harte (1-1), M Penrose (0-2), Mark Donnelly (0-2), Mattie Donnelly (0-2), O Mulligan (0-2), S O'Neill (0-2), C McCarron (0-1), K Coney (0-1)	Report	Paddy Bradley (0-3), C Kielt (0-2), C O'Boyle (0-2), M Lynch (0-1), PJ McCloskey (0-1)	Healy Park, Omagh; Referee: M. Deegan

03/03/12; Round 3	Derry	0-14 – 0-8	Monaghan	Celtic Park, Derry; Referee: E Kinsella
03/03/12; Round 3	Paddy Bradley (0-6), M Bateson (0-2), M Lynch (0-2), B McGoldrick (0-1), E Lynn (0-1), M Craig (0-1), SL McGoldrick (0-1)	Report	K Hughes (0-2), P Finlay (0-2), Darren Hughes (0-1), E Duffy (0-1)	Celtic Park, Derry; Referee: E Kinsella

03/03/12; Round 3	Meath	2-11 – 0-18	Kildare	Páirc Tailteann, Navan; Referee: M Collins
03/03/12; Round 3	P Gilsenan (1-2), S Bray (0-4), D Tobin (1-0), C O'Connor (0-1), C Ward (0-1), M Burke (0-1), S McAnarney (0-1), T Walsh (0-1)	Report	E O'Flaherty (0-6), E Callaghan (0-2), O Lyons (0-2), P O'Neill (0-2), A Smith (0-1), D Flynn (0-1), H McGrillen (0-1), M Conway (0-1), M O'Flaherty (0-1), T O'Connor (0-1)	Páirc Tailteann, Navan; Referee: M Collins

04/03/12; Round 3	Westmeath	0-14 – 0-13	Galway	Cusack Park, Mullingar; Referee: D Gough
04/03/12; Round 3	J Heslin (0-7), C McCormack (0-1), David Glennon (0-1), Denis Glennon (0-1), G Egan (0-1), P Bannon (0-1), P Sharry (0-1), P Sheridan (0-1)	Report	M Martin (0-4), D Cummins (0-2), P Conroy (0-2), C Doherty (0-1), K McGrath (0-1), M Hehir (0-1), N Coleman (0-1), S Armstrong (0-1)	Cusack Park, Mullingar; Referee: D Gough

04/03/12; Round 3	Louth	0-13 – 2-13	Tyrone	Drogheda Park, Drogheda; Referee: G McCormack
04/03/12; Round 3	D Maguire (0-3), D Crilly (0-2), A McDonnell (0-1), B Donnelly (0-1), B White (0-1), D Clarke (0-1), M Brennan (0-1), P Keenan (0-1), R Finnegan (0-1)	Report	P Harte (1-1), O Mulligan (0-3), D McCaul (1-0), C McCarron (0-2), K Coney (0-2), M Donnelly (0-2), M Penrose (0-1), N McKenna (0-1), P McNiece (0-1)	Drogheda Park, Drogheda; Referee: G McCormack

10/03/12; Round 4	Tyrone	2-11 – 0-8	Westmeath	Healy Park, Omagh; Referee: J Curley
10/03/12; Round 4	M Penrose (1-2), K Coney (0-4), P Harte (1-0), O Mulligan (0-2), D McCaul (0-1), J Lafferty (0-1), S Cavanagh (0-1)	Report	Denis Glennon (0-3), David Glennon (0-1), G Egan (0-1), J Heslin (0-1), K Martin (0-1), R Foley (0-1)	Healy Park, Omagh; Referee: J Curley

11/03/12; Round 4	Monaghan	2-24 – 1-15	Louth	St Tiernach's Park, Clones; Referee: D Fahy
11/03/12; Round 4	C McGuinness (1-3), P Finlay (0-5), O Duffy (0-4), T Freeman (0-3), D Clerkin (0-2), J Turley (0-2), O Lennon (0-2), S Gollogly (0-2), C Hanratty (0-1)	Report	D Clarke (0-5), D Maguire (0-2), J McEneaney (0-2), R Carroll (0-2), A Reid (0-1), B Donnelly (0-1), D Byrne (0-1), M Brennan (0-1)	St Tiernach's Park, Clones; Referee: D Fahy

11/03/12; Round 4	Galway	1-12 – 1-11	Meath	Pearse Stadium, Salthill; Referee: G McCormack
11/03/12; Round 4	N Joyce (0-6), P Conroy (1-1), D Cummins (0-2), G Bradshaw (0-1), G Sice (0-1), N Coleman (0-1)	Report	S Bray (0-4), C Ward (0-3), J Sheridan (1-0), M Ward (0-2), T Walsh (0-1)	Pearse Stadium, Salthill; Referee: G McCormack

11/03/12; Round 4	Derry	2-8 – 2-13	Kildare	St Conleth's Park, Newbridge; Referee: M Higgins
11/03/12; Round 4	C Gilligan (0-4), P Bradley (0-3), SL McGoldrick (1-0), E Lynn (0-1)	Report	J Doyle (1-3), E O'Flaherty (0-4), A Smith (1-0), J Kavanagh (0-2), D Earley (0-1), M Conway (0-1), M O'Flaherty (0-1), P O'Neill (0-1)	St Conleth's Park, Newbridge; Referee: M Higgins

18/03/12; Round 5	Westmeath	1-19 – 2-11	Monaghan	Cusack Park, Mullingar; Referee: M Condon
18/03/12; Round 5	G Egan (0-5), David Glennon (0-4), Denis Glennon (0-3), C McCormack (0-2), J Heslin (0-2), M Ennis (0-1), P Sheridan (0-1)	Report	P Finlay (1-5), C McGuinness (1-0), C Hanratty (0-2), E Duffy (0-1), E Lennon (0-1), J Turley (0-1), S Gollogly (0-1)	Cusack Park, Mullingar; Referee: M Condon

18/03/12; Round 5	Meath	0-10 – 0-13	Derry	Páirc Tailteann, Navan; Referee: P Hughes
18/03/12; Round 5	S Bray (0-5), C Ward (0-2), B Farrell (0-1), G Reilly (0-1), S Kenny (0-1)	Report	Paddy Bradley (0-4), B Gormley (0-2), C Gilligan (0-2), E Lynn (0-2), B McCallion (0-1), C Kielt (0-1), Patsy Bradley (0-1)	Páirc Tailteann, Navan; Referee: P Hughes

18/03/12; Round 5	Louth	0-17 – 2-15	Kildare	Drogheda Park, Drogheda; Referee: D Coldrick
18/03/12; Round 5	D Clarke (0-11), J McEneaney (0-2), G Hoey (0-1), M Brennan (0-1), P Keenan (0-1), R Finnegan (0-1)	Report	M Conway (0-4), J Kavanagh (1-1), M O'Flaherty (1-1), E Callaghan (0-3), J Doyle (0-2), T O'Connor (0-2), E O'Flaherty (0-1), H McGrillen (0-1)	Drogheda Park, Drogheda; Referee: D Coldrick

18/03/12; Round 5	Galway	0-13 – 1-14	Tyrone	St Jarlath's Park, Tuam; Referee: E Kinsella
18/03/12; Round 5	N Joyce (0-4), G Sice (0-3), G O'Donnell (0-2), A Faherty (0-1), D Cummins (0-1), P Conroy (0-1), P Joyce (0-1)	Report	K Coney (0-5), O Mulligan (0-3), P Harte (1-0), C McCarron (0-1), M Penrose (0-1), Mark Donnelly (0-1), Matthew Donnelly (0-1), S Cavanagh (0-1), S O'Neill (0-1)	St Jarlath's Park, Tuam; Referee: E Kinsella

24/03/12; Round 6	Tyrone	1-12 – 0-5	Meath	Healy Park, Omagh; Referee: P Hughes
24/03/12; Round 6	S O'Neill (1-2), K Coney (0-4), P Harte (0-2), S Cavanagh (0-2), A Cassidy (0-1), C McCarron (0-1)	Report	C Ward (0-3), G Reilly (0-1), S Bray (0-1)	Healy Park, Omagh; Referee: P Hughes

25/03/12; Round 6	Derry	0-19 – 1-16	Louth	Celtic Park, Derry; Referee: Michael Duffy
25/03/12; Round 6	P Bradley (0-7), C Gilligan (0-6), B Gormley (0-1), C Kielt (0-1), Enda Lynn (0-1)	Report	D Clarke (1-7), J McEneaney (0-3), A Hoey (0-1), A Reid (0-1), B White (0-1), D Maguire (0-1), J Carr (0-1), R Carroll (0-1)	Celtic Park, Derry; Referee: Michael Duffy

25/03/12; Round 6	Monaghan	0-12 – 1-14	Galway	Inniskeen Grattan's GAC, Inniskeen; Referee: C Reilly
25/03/12; Round 6	P Finlay (0-6), D Hughes (0-2), C McGuinness (0-1), D Clerkin (0-1), G McQuaid (0-1), S Smyth (0-1)	Report	P Conroy (0-6), P Joyce (0-3), M Hehir (0-2), G O'Donnell (0-1), G Sice (0-1), M Martin (0-1)	Inniskeen Grattan's GAC, Inniskeen; Referee: C Reilly

25/03/12; Round 6	Kildare	2-23 – 1-12	Westmeath	St Conleth's Park, Newbridge; Referee: D Brazil
25/03/12; Round 6	J Kavanagh (2-2), M Conway (0-6), E O'Flaherty (0-5), E Bolton (1-1), A Smith (0-3), P O'Neill (0-2), B Flanagan (0-1), J Doyle (0-1), P Fogarty (0-1), T O'Connor (0-1)	Report	Denis Glennon (0-7), J Heslin (0-3), David Glennon (1-0), K Martin (0-1), R Foley (0-1)	St Conleth's Park, Newbridge; Referee: D Brazil

08/04/12; Round 7	Westmeath	1-15 – 0-10	Derry	Cusack Park, Mullingar; Referee: M Sludden
08/04/12; Round 7	J Heslin (0-4), K Martin (0-4), Denis Glennon (0-3), J Dolan (1-0), C McCormack (0-2), D McDermott (0-1), P Sharry (0-1)	Report	Paddy Bradley (0-4), SL McGoldrick (0-2), B McGoldrick (0-1), C O'Boyle (0-1), E Lynn (0-1), R Scott (0-1)	Cusack Park, Mullingar; Referee: M Sludden

08/04/12; Round 7	Meath	1-8 – 2-14	Louth	Páirc Tailteann, Navan; Referee: M Collins
08/04/12; Round 7	C Ward (0-3), T Walsh (1-0), S Bray (0-2), B Menton (0-1), G Reilly (0-1), M Burke (0-1)	Report	D Maguire (2-2), D Clarke (0-6), R Carroll (0-3), A Reid (0-1), D Byrne (0-1), P Keenan (0-1)	Páirc Tailteann, Navan; Referee: M Collins

08/04/12; Round 7	Tyrone	1-16 – 1-6	Monaghan	Healy Park, Omagh; Referee: M Higgins
08/04/12; Round 7	K Coney (0-8), C McCarron (1-1), O Mulligan (0-3), S Cavanagh (0-2), C Cavanagh (0-1), P Harte (0-1)	Report	P Finlay (0-4), C Hanratty (1-0), T Freeman (0-2)	Healy Park, Omagh; Referee: M Higgins

08/04/12; Round 7	Galway	0-18 – 2-12	Kildare	St Jarlath's Park, Tuam; Referee: E Kinsella
08/04/12; Round 7	M Hehir (0-3), P Conroy (0-3), P Joyce (0-3), A Faherty (0-2), G Sice (0-2), D Burke (0-1), D Cummins (0-1), G Bradshaw (0-1), G Higgins (0-1), M Martin (0-1)	Report	A Smith (0-4), E Bolton (1-1), J Doyle (1-1), J Kavanagh (0-3), D Earley (0-1), E O'Flaherty (0-1), M Conway (0-1)	St Jarlath's Park, Tuam; Referee: E Kinsella

=== Division 2 final ===
29/04/12; 14:00	Kildare	0-16 – 0-11	Tyrone	Croke Park, Dublin; Attendance: 22,827^{2} Referee: D Coldrick
29/04/12; 14:00	M Conway (0-5), E O'Flaherty (0-3), P Fogarty (0-3), J Doyle (0-2), E Callaghan (0-1), J Kavanagh (0-1), T O'Connor (0-1)	Report	O Mulligan (0-4), S O'Neill (0-3), M Donnelly (0-2), N McKenna (0-1), S Cavanagh (0-1)	Croke Park, Dublin; Attendance: 22,827^{2} Referee: D Coldrick

^{2}Attendance figure is total of the Division 1 and Division 2 finals played consecutively

== Division 3 ==
=== Table ===
Compete in Division 3 final and automatic promotion to Division 2 Automatic relegation to Division 4

Team	Pld	W	D	L	F	A	Diff	Pts
Longford	7	6	1	0	5-96	5-64	32	13
Wexford	7	5	0	2	10-111	13-71	31	10
Sligo	7	4	0	3	9-84	3-91	11	8
Roscommon	7	4	0	3	6-81	5-76	8	8
Antrim	7	4	0	3	11-69	2-89	7	8
Cavan	7	2	0	5	6-79	11-74	-10	4
Tipperary	7	1	1	5	1-77	9-91	-38	3
Offaly	7	1	0	6	6-57	6-98	-41	2

^{1}Sligo, Roscommon and Antrim are ranked by points difference.

=== Rounds 1 to 7 ===
04/02/12; Round 1	Antrim	0-13 – 0-12	Sligo	Casement Park, Belfast; Referee: M. Higgins
04/02/12; Round 1	T McCann (0-5), B Neeson (0-3), P Cunningham (0-2), C Murray (0-1), K Brady (0-1), S Finch (0-1)	Report	A Marren (0-5), C McGee (0-3), M Breheny (0-2), J Clarke (0-1), P Hughes (0-1)	Casement Park, Belfast; Referee: M. Higgins

05/02/12; Round 1	Roscommon	1-12 – 0-12	Tipperary	Newpark, Kiltoom; Referee: J. Curley
05/02/12; Round 1	D Shine (0-3), C Devaney (1-0), G Heneghan (0-2), J Rogers (0-2), N Daly (0-2), D McDermott (0-1), K Higgins (0-1), M Finneran (0-1)	Report	B Grogan (0-4), P Austin (0-4), S Ryan (0-2), B Mulvihill (0-1), E Ryan (0-1)	Newpark, Kiltoom; Referee: J. Curley

05/02/12; Round 1	Longford	2-15 – 0-8	Offaly	Pearse Park, Longford; Referee: J. Curley
05/02/12; Round 1	S McCormack (0-10), P Kelly (1-1), N Mulligan (1-0), P Barden (0-2), B McElvaney (0-1), R Smyth (0-1)	Report	A Mulhall (0-4), B Allen (0-2), N Dunne (0-1), W Mulhall (0-1)	Pearse Park, Longford; Referee: J. Curley

05/02/12; Round 1	Wexford	4-9 – 1-13	Cavan	Wexford Park, Wexford; Referee: M. Collins
05/02/12; Round 1	E Bradley (2-0), B Brosnan (0-5), C Lyng (1-1), PJ Banville (1-1), A Flynn (0-1), P Byrne (0-1)	Report	R Galligan (0-5), N McDermott (0-3), G McKiernan (1-0), N Smith (0-2), B Fitzpatrick (0-1), D McKiernan (0-1), E Keating (0-1)	Wexford Park, Wexford; Referee: M. Collins

11/02/12; Round 2	Cavan	0-7 – 0-10	Longford	Breffni Park, Cavan; Referee: B. O'Shea
11/02/12; Round 2	E Keating (0-2), N McDermott (0-2), R Galligan (0-2), P O'Reilly (0-1)	Report	S McCormack (0-4), J McGivney (0-2), P Barden (0-2), M Quinn (0-1)	Breffni Park, Cavan; Referee: B. O'Shea

12/02/12; Round 2	Tipperary	0-13 – 1-13	Antrim	Semple Stadium, Thurles; Referee: C. Lane
12/02/12; Round 2	B Grogan (0-8), P Austin (0-3), H Coghlan (0-1), M Quinlivan (0-1)	Report	T McCann (0-5), J Loughrey (1-1), P Cunningham (0-3), M Armstrong (0-2), M Magill (0-1), M McCann (0-1)	Semple Stadium, Thurles; Referee: C. Lane

12/02/12; Round 2	Sligo	4-14 – 1-17	Wexford	Markievicz Park, Sligo; Referee: R. O'Donnell
12/02/12; Round 2	A Marren (3-5), A Costello (1-3), M Breheny (0-2), B Egan (0-1), C McGee (0-1), J Clarke (0-1), P Hughes (0-1)	Report	C Lyng (0-5), A Flynn (0-3), R Barry (0-3), PJ Banville (1-0), P Byrne (0-2), S Roche (0-2), B Brosnan (0-1), C Morris (0-1)	Markievicz Park, Sligo; Referee: R. O'Donnell

12/02/12; Round 2	Offaly	1-6 – 0-12	Roscommon	O'Connor Park, Tullamore; Referee: V. Neary
12/02/12; Round 2	B Allen (0-3), A Sullivan (1-0), A Mulhall (0-2), B Darby (0-1)	Report	C Devanney (0-4), B Murtagh (0-2), M Scally (0-2), C Cafferkey (0-1), C Compton (0-1), G Heneghan (0-1), S Purcell (0-1)	O'Connor Park, Tullamore; Referee: V. Neary

03/03/12; Round 3	Antrim	2-14 – 1-8	Offaly	Casement Park, Belfast; Referee: C Branagan
03/03/12; Round 3	T McCann (1-3), P Cunningham (1-1), B Neeson (0-3), J Loughery (0-3), C Kelly (0-1), M McCann (0-1), M Sweeney (0-1), T Scullion (0-1)	Report	N Dunne (1-5), K Casey (0-2), D Hanlon (0-1)	Casement Park, Belfast; Referee: C Branagan

03/03/12; Round 3	Cavan	0-14 – 1-8	Sligo	Breffni Park, Cavan; Referee: P Fox
03/03/12; Round 3	M Dunne (0-4), G McKiernan (0-3), B Fitzpatrick (0-2), K Meehan (0-2), D Givney (0-1), N Smith (0-1), R Maloney-Derham (0-1)	Report	A Marren (0-5), C McGee (1-2), M Breheny (0-1)	Breffni Park, Cavan; Referee: P Fox

04/03/12; Round 3	Longford	0-16 – 2-8	Roscommon	Pearse Park, Longford; Referee: S McNamee
04/03/12; Round 3	S McCormack (0-7), B McElvaney (0-3), B Kavanagh (0-2), P Kelly (0-2), D McElligott (0-1), M Quinn (0-1)	Report	D Shine (0-3), C Cregg (1-0), G Heneghan (1-0), B Murtagh (0-1), D McDermott (0-1), K Higgins (0-1), K Mannion (0-1), M Finneran (0-1)	Pearse Park, Longford; Referee: S McNamee

04/03/12; Round 3	Wexford	2-20 – 1-8	Tipperary	Wexford Park, Wexford; Referee: B O'Shea
04/03/12; Round 3	B Brosnan (0-7), PJ Banville (1-4), R Barry (1-2), C Lyng (0-4), A Doyle (0-1), A Shore (0-1), C Morris (0-1)	Report	B Grogan (0-4), P Acheson (1-0), M Quinlivan (0-1), P Austin (0-1), S Carey (0-1), T Ryan (0-1)	Wexford Park, Wexford; Referee: B O'Shea

11/03/12; Round 4	Tipperary	0-14 – 4-10	Cavan	Semple Stadium, Thurles; Referee: M Meade
11/03/12; Round 4	B Grogan (0-9), B O'Brien (0-1), D Heffernan (0-1), H Coghlan (0-1), P Acheson (0-1), S Ryan (0-1)	Report	M Dunne (2-4), M McKeever (1-1), N McDermott (0-3), B Watters (1-0), G McKiernan (0-1), P O'Reilly (0-1)	Semple Stadium, Thurles; Referee: M Meade

11/03/12; Round 4	Offaly	2-5 – 1-21	Wexford	O'Connor Park, Tullamore; Referee: P Hughes
11/03/12; Round 4	N Dunne (0-3), B Allen (1-0), K Casey (1-0), B Connor (0-2)	Report	B Brosnan (0-5), PJ Banville (0-5), S Roche (1-2), C Lyng (0-4), A Flynn (0-2), A Doyle (0-1), M O'Leary (0-1), R Barry (0-1)	O'Connor Park, Tullamore; Referee: P Hughes

11/03/12; Round 4	Sligo	1-8 – 1-16	Longford	Markievicz Park, Sligo; Referee: M Sludden
11/03/12; Round 4	A Marren (1-3), S Coen (0-2), C McGee (0-1), M Breheny (0-1), T Taylor (0-1)	Report	S McCormack (0-10), P Barden (1-1), D McElligott (0-1), N Mulligan (0-1)	Markievicz Park, Sligo; Referee: M Sludden

11/03/12; Round 4	Roscommon	1-10 – 1-6	Antrim	Dr. Hyde Park, Roscommon; Referee: D Corcoran
11/03/12; Round 4	D McDermott (0-4), C Devaney (1-0), G Heneghan (0-2), C Cregg (0-1), C Dineen (0-1), I Kilbride (0-1), K Higgins (0-1)	Report	P Cunningham (0-4), M Magill (1-0), M McCann (0-1), T McCann (0-1)	Dr. Hyde Park, Roscommon; Referee: D Corcoran

18/03/12; Round 5	Cavan	0-11 – 1-10	Offaly	Breffni Park, Cavan; Referee: S Carroll
18/03/12; Round 5	M Dunne (0-3), G McKiernan (0-2), N McDermott (0-2), N Smith (0-2), B Fitzpatrick (0-1), N Murray (0-1)	Report	K Casey (1-1), B Connor (0-3), J Moloney (0-2), N Dunne (0-2), N McNamee (0-2)	Breffni Park, Cavan; Referee: S Carroll

18/03/12; Round 5	Longford	0-15 – 1-8	Antrim	Pearse Park, Longford; Referee: P Kneel
18/03/12; Round 5	P Barden (0-5), S McCormack (0-5), B McElvaney (0-2), B Kavanagh (0-1), N Mulligan (0-1), S Mulligan (0-1)	Report	T McCann (1-5), P Cunningham (0-2), M Sweeney (0-1)	Pearse Park, Longford; Referee: P Kneel

18/03/12; Round 5	Wexford	1-12 – 1-10	Roscommon	Wexford Park, Wexford; Referee: C Lane
18/03/12; Round 5	P J Banville (1-4), B Brosnan (0-5), A Flynn (0-1), D Waters (0-1), C Lyng (0-1),	Report	D Shine (1-1), C Cregg (0-3), J Rogers (0-2), D McDermott (0-2), N Daly (0-1), C Dineen (0-1),	Wexford Park, Wexford; Referee: C Lane

18/03/12; Round 5	Sligo	1-16 – 0-7	Tipperary	Markievicz Park, Sligo; Referee: R McBrien
18/03/12; Round 5	T Taylor (2-0), C McGee (1-2), A Marren (0-4), S Coen (0-4), M Breheny (0-2), A Costello (0-2)	Report	P Austin (0-3), R Costigan (0-1), P Acheson, H Coghlan (0-1); B O'Brien (0-1), S Ryan (0-1)	Markievicz Park, Sligo; Referee: R McBrien

24/03/12; Round 6	Tipperary	0-12 – 0-12	Longford	Semple Stadium, Thurles; Referee: R Moloney
24/03/12; Round 6	B Grogan (0-7), B O'Brien (0-2), P Acheson (0-2), P Austin (0-1)	Report	B Kavanagh (0-5), P Barden (0-4), B McElvaney (0-1), JJ Matthews (0-1), M Quinn (0-1)	Semple Stadium, Thurles; Referee: R Moloney

25/03/12; Round 6	Antrim	2-9 – 0-19	Wexford	Casement Park, Belfast; Referee: C Reynolds
25/03/12; Round 6	M McCann (1-2), M Magill (1-1), T McCann (0-3), B Neeson (0-1), J Loughrey (0-1), S McDonagh (0-1)	Report	C Lyng (0-5), A Flynn (0-3), B Brosnan (0-3), PJ Banville (0-3), R Barry (0-2), J Holmes (0-1), R Quinlivan (0-1)	Casement Park, Belfast; Referee: C Reynolds

25/03/12; Round 6	Offaly	1-12 – 1-14	Sligo	O'Connor Park, Tullamore; Referee: D O'Mahoney
25/03/12; Round 6	B Allen (1-2), A Sullivan (0-2), J Coughlan (0-2), K Casey (0-2), N Dunne (0-2), D Kelly (0-1), N McNamee (0-1)	Report	A Marren (1-4), M Breheny (0-5), S Coen (0-4), C McGee (0-1)	O'Connor Park, Tullamore; Referee: D O'Mahoney

25/03/12; Round 6	Roscommon	1-17 – 1-12	Cavan	Dr. Hyde Park, Roscommon; Referee: D Gough
25/03/12; Round 6	D Shine (0-7), K Higgins (0-3), D O'Gara (1-0), C Cregg (0-2), J Rogers (0-2), D Keenan (0-1), K Mannion (0-1), S Kilbride (0-1)	Report	D Givney (1-1), M Dunne (0-3), B Fitzpatrick (0-2), N McDermott (0-2), K Meehan (0-1), M McKeever (0-1), N Smith (0-1), P O'Reilly (0-1)	Dr. Hyde Park, Roscommon; Referee: D Gough

08/04/12; Round 7	Cavan	0-12 – 4-6	Antrim	Breffni Park, Cavan; Referee: D Fahy
08/04/12; Round 7	M Dunne (0-7), D Givney (0-1), D Reilly (0-1), N McDermott (0-1), P O'Reilly (0-1), S Gaffney (0-1)	Report	J Loughry (2-2), C Duffin (1-1), A Gallagher (1-0), T McCann (0-2), S McDonagh (0-1)	Breffni Park, Cavan; Referee: D Fahy

08/04/12; Round 7	Longford	2-12 – 1-13	Wexford	Pearse Park, Longford; Referee: P Fox
08/04/12; Round 7	B Kavanagh (1-7), M Quinn (1-1), B McKeon (0-1), N Mulligan (0-1), P Barden (0-1), P McCormack (0-1)	Report	C Lyng (1-4), M O'Regan (0-5), S Roche (0-2), B Malone (0-1)	Pearse Park, Longford; Referee: P Fox

08/04/12; Round 7	Tipperary	0-11 – 0-8	Offaly	Semple Stadium, Thurles; Referee: P O'Sullivan
08/04/12; Round 7	B Grogan (0-6), B O'Brien (0-3), A Moloney (0-1)	Report	B Connor (0-4), B Allen (0-2), A Mulhall (0-1), M Brazil (0-1)	Semple Stadium, Thurles; Referee: P O'Sullivan

08/04/12; Round 7	Sligo	1-12 – 0-12	Roscommon	Markievicz Park, Sligo; Referee: B Cassidy
08/04/12; Round 7	A Marren (1-3), M Breheny (0-3), D Rooney (0-2), S McManus (0-2), A Costello (0-1), P McGovern (0-1)	Report	C Cregg (0-3), C Devaney (0-2), K Higgins (0-2), S Kilbride (0-2), E Kenny (0-1), G Heneghan (0-1), J Rogers (0-1)	Markievicz Park, Sligo; Referee: B Cassidy

=== Division 3 final ===
28/04/12; 19:00	Longford	1-12 – 0-13	Wexford	Croke Park, Dublin; Attendance: 7,514^{3} Referee: C Lane
28/04/12; 19:00	S McCormack (0-9), P Kelly (1-0), P Barden (0-2), N Mulligan (0-1)	Report	C Lyng (0-4), R Barry (0-3), S Roche (0-2), A Flynn (0-1), B Brosnan (0-1), E Bradley (0-1), PJ Banville (0-1)	Croke Park, Dublin; Attendance: 7,514^{3} Referee: C Lane

^{3}Attendance figure is total of the Division 3 and Division 4 finals played consecutively

== Division 4 ==
=== Table ===
Compete in Division 4 final and automatic promotion to Division 3

Team	Pld	W	D	L	F	A	Diff	Pts
Fermanagh	8	7	1	0	14-119	1-67	91	15
Wicklow	8	6	0	2	11-112	7-77	47	12
Clare	8	6	0	2	6-117	2-86	43	12
Limerick	8	4	1	3	5-118	5-80	38	9
Leitrim	8	4	0	4	8-94	7-81	16	8
Waterford	8	3	1	4	6-99	4-98	7	7
Carlow	8	3	0	5	7-86	6-87	2	6
London	8	1	1	6	5-91	7-90	-5	3
Kilkenny	8	0	0	8	3-25	26-195	-239	0

^{1}Wicklow are placed ahead of Clare because they won the head-to-head game between the teams (1-15 to 1-12).

=== Rounds 1 to 8 ===
05/02/12; Round 1	Clare	1-17 – 0-12	Waterford	Cusack Park, Ennis; Referee: F. Flynn
05/02/12; Round 1	D Tubridy (0-7), R Donnelly (1-2), A Clohessy (0-4), S McGrath (0-2), G Brennan (0-1), G Quinlan (0-1)	Report	G Hurney (0-4), C McGrath (0-2), P Hurney (0-2), S Fleming (0-2), S Ahearne (0-1), S O'Hare (0-1)	Cusack Park, Ennis; Referee: F. Flynn

05/02/12; Round 1	Kilkenny	1-1 – 3-25	Wicklow	Páirc Lachtain, Freshford; Referee: N. Ward
05/02/12; Round 1	J Culleton (1-0), R Shore (0-1)	Report	J Kelly (1-7), S Furlong (1-5), T Hannon (0-4), L Glynn (1-1), A Merriman (0-2), A O'Malley (0-2), D O'Sullivan (0-2), N Mernagh (0-1), P Cronin (0-1)	Páirc Lachtain, Freshford; Referee: N. Ward

05/02/12; Round 1	Leitrim	0-9 – 1-9	Limerick	Páirc Seán Mac Diarmada, Carrick-on-Shannon; Referee: S. McLaughan
05/02/12; Round 1	J Glancy (0-3), R Lowe (0-3), C Clarke (0-2), A Croal (0-1)	Report	I Ryan (0-6), E O'Connor (0-3), J Riordan (1-0)	Páirc Seán Mac Diarmada, Carrick-on-Shannon; Referee: S. McLaughan

11/02/12; Round 2	Waterford	0-21 – 0-2	Kilkenny	Fraher Field, Dungarvan; Referee: J. Lynch
11/02/12; Round 2	G Hurney (0-8), P Hurney (0-4), S Fleming (0-3), C McGrath (0-2), J Veale (0-1), JJ Hutchinson (0-1), S Briggs (0-1), T Grey (0-1)	Report	B Byrne (0-1), S Duggan (0-1)	Fraher Field, Dungarvan; Referee: J. Lynch

12/02/12; Round 2	Carlow	0-13 – 2-9	Leitrim	Dr. Cullen Park, Carlow; Referee: F. Kelly
12/02/12; Round 2	D Foley (0-5), Brian Murphy (0-2), C Murphy (0-2), D Hayden (0-1), E Finnegan (0-1), S Gannon (0-1)	Report	J Glancy (1-3), R Cox (1-2), G Hickey (0-4),	Dr. Cullen Park, Carlow; Referee: F. Kelly

12/02/12; Round 2	Fermanagh	0-11 – 0-8	Clare	Brewster Park, Enniskillen; Referee: J Henry
12/02/12; Round 2	Seamus Quigley (0-6), P Ward (0-3), B Mulrone (0-1), S Lyons (0-1)	Report	D Tubridy (0-5), A Clohessy (0-1), D Russell (0-1), S McGrath (0-1)	Brewster Park, Enniskillen; Referee: J Henry

12/02/12; Round 2	Limerick	1-13 – 1-7	London	Gaelic Grounds, Limerick; Referee: K. O'Brien
12/02/12; Round 2	I Ryan (1-6), E O'Connor (0-3), G Collins (0-2), G O'Connell (0-1), J O'Meara (0-1)	Report	P McGoldrick (1-4), E O'Neill (0-2), S McVeigh (0-1)	Gaelic Grounds, Limerick; Referee: K. O'Brien

19/02/12; Round 1 refixture	London	0-9 – 2-15	Fermanagh	Emerald GAA Grounds, Ruislip
19/02/12; Round 1 refixture	E O'Neill (0-2), M Gottsche (0-2), S Kelly (0-2), F McVey (0-1), S Hannon (0-1), S McVeigh (0-1)	[ Report]	Seamus Quigley (1-5), D Keenan (1-0), B Mulrone (0-2), C Quigley (0-2), P Ward (0-2), E Donnelly (0-1), Sean Quigley (0-1), S Lyons (0-1), T Corrigan (0-1)	Emerald GAA Grounds, Ruislip

04/03/12; Round 3	London	0-4 – 2-6	Carlow	Emerald GAA Grounds, Ruislip; Referee: R Moloney
04/03/12; Round 3	E ONeill (0-1), L Colfer (0-1), M Gottsche (0-1)	Report	Brian Murphy (1-2), JJ Smith (1-0), P Reid (0-2), D Hayden (0-1)	Emerald GAA Grounds, Ruislip; Referee: R Moloney

04/03/12; Round 3	Clare	0-10 – 0-9	Limerick	Cusack Park, Ennis; Referee: B Tyrell
04/03/12; Round 3	D Tubridy (0-5), S McGrath (0-2), G Brennan (0-1), G Quinlan (0-1), Graham Kelly (0-1)	Report	I Ryan (0-5), G Collins (0-2), P Ranahan (0-1), S Kelly (0-1)	Cusack Park, Ennis; Referee: B Tyrell

04/03/12; Round 3	Wicklow	1-12 – 4-7	Waterford	Aughrim County Ground, Aughrim; Referee: D O'Mahoney
04/03/12; Round 3	S Furlong (0-5), L Glynn (1-0), A O'Malley (0-2), J Stafford (0-1), P Burke (0-1)	Report	M Ferncombe (3-0), P Hurney (0-3), S Ahearne (1-0), S Fleming (0-2), C McGrath (0-1), G Hurney (0-1)	Aughrim County Ground, Aughrim; Referee: D O'Mahoney

04/03/12; Round 3	Kilkenny	0-4 – 9-23	Fermanagh	Nowlan Park, Kilkenny; Referee: M Rock
04/03/12; Round 3	S Duggan (0-3), G Lawlor (0-1)	Report	Seamus Quigley (2-12), R Keenan (2-1), B Cox (1-1), D McCusker (1-1), J Sherry (1-1), P Ward (1-1), D Kille (0-3), M Jones (1-0), M Little (0-1), N McGovern (0-1), R Jones (0-1)	Nowlan Park, Kilkenny; Referee: M Rock

10/03/12; Round 4	Limerick	1-30 – 0-1	Kilkenny	Newcastlewest GAA Field, Newcastlewest; Referee: E O'Grady
10/03/12; Round 4	I Ryan (1-7), S Kelly (0-6), G Collins (0-5), M Quilligan (0-3), S Buckley (0-3), J Cooke (0-2), J McCarthy (0-1), J Riordan (0-1), S Lavin (0-1), S Lucey (0-1)	Report	K Bergin (0-1)	Newcastlewest GAA Field, Newcastlewest; Referee: E O'Grady

11/03/12; Round 4	Fermanagh	0-11 – 0-9	Wicklow	Brewster Park, Enniskillen; Referee: C Reynolds
11/03/12; Round 4	B Cox (0-10), Seamus Quigley (0-4), P Ward (0-2), C Quigley (0-1), D Keenan (0-1), E Donnelly (0-1), N Bogue (0-1)	Report	S Furlong (0-3), L Glynn (0-2), T Hannon (0-2), D Hayden (0-1), R Finn (0-1)	Brewster Park, Enniskillen; Referee: C Reynolds

11/03/12; Round 4	Carlow	0-14 – 1-12	Clare	Dr. Cullen Park, Carlow; Referee: D Maher
11/03/12; Round 4	Brendan Murphy (0-4), P Reid (0-2), D Hayden (0-1), J Murphy (0-1)	Report	D Tubridy (0-5), M O'Shea (1-1), R Donnelly (1-1), A Clohessy (0-3)	Dr. Cullen Park, Carlow; Referee: D Maher

11/03/12; Round 4	Leitrim	1-10 – 0-8	London	Páirc Seán Mac Diarmada, Carrick-on-Shannon; Referee: S McLaughan
11/03/12; Round 4	R Cox (1-3), J Glancy (0-4), D Sweeney (0-1), P McGowan (0-1), R Lowe (0-1)	Report	E O'Neill (0-3), M Mullins (0-3), P McDermott (0-1), S Doolan (0-1)	Páirc Seán Mac Diarmada, Carrick-on-Shannon; Referee: S McLaughan

18/03/12; Round 5	Wicklow	2-13 – 0-14	Limerick	Aughrim County Ground, Aughrim; Referee: F Barry
18/03/12; Round 5	T Hannon (1-4), L Glynn (1-3), S Furlong (0-5), R Finn (0-1)	Report	I Ryan (0-7), B Scanlon (0-2), G Collins (0-1), J Mullane (0-1), J O'Meara (0-1), S Lavin (0-1)	Aughrim County Ground, Aughrim; Referee: F Barry

18/03/12; Round 5	Kilkenny	1-6 – 3-11	Carlow	Páirc Lachtain, Freshford
18/03/12; Round 5	G. Lawlor (1-3), J. Fennelly (0-1), M. Malone (0-1), S. Duggan (0-1)	Report	C Mullins (1-3), S. Gannon (1-1), E. Ruth (0-2), D. Foley (0-1), D. Hayden (0-1)	Páirc Lachtain, Freshford

18/03/12; Round 5	Waterford	0-12 – 0-15	Fermanagh	Fraher Field, Dungarvan; Referee: M Rock
18/03/12; Round 5	G Hurney (0-5), S Ahearne (0-3), M Ferncombe (0-2), K Connery (0-1), J Veale (0-1)	Report	Seamus Quigley (0-5), P Ward (0-5), S McCabe (0-2), R Jones (0-1), E Donnelly (0-1), E Maguire (0-1)	Fraher Field, Dungarvan; Referee: M Rock

18/03/12; Round 5	Clare	1-12 – 0-9	Leitrim	Cusack Park, Ennis; Referee: D O’Mahoney
18/03/12; Round 5	S McGrath (1-3), R Donnelly (0-3), D Tubridy (0-3), A Clohessy (0-2), J Dowling (0-1)	Report	J Glancy (0-5), W McKeon (0-1), R Lowe (0-1), D Gilhooley (0-1)	Cusack Park, Ennis; Referee: D O’Mahoney

24/03/12; Round 6	Limerick	1-14 – 1-18	Waterford	Gaelic Grounds, Limerick; Referee: M Rock
24/03/12; Round 6	I Ryan (0-10), G Collins (0-3), S O’Carroll (1-0), E Barry (0-1)	Report	G Hurney (0-7), M Ferncombe (1-2), P Hurney (0-3), S Ahearne (0-3), W Hennessy (0-1), S O’Hare (0-1), J Veale (0-1).	Gaelic Grounds, Limerick; Referee: M Rock

24/03/12; Round 6	Leitrim	4-26 – 0-3	Kilkenny	Páirc Seán Mac Diarmada, Carrick-on-Shannon; Referee: L. Devenny
24/03/12; Round 6	E Mulligan (2-8), K Conlan (1-2), P McGowan (0-4), W McKeon (1-1), R Lowe (0-3), G Hickey (0-2), C Sheridan (0-1), D Sweeney (0-1), G Reynolds (0-1), P Brennan (0-1), P Maguire (0-1)	Report	R Shore (0-2), S. Duggan (0-1)	Páirc Seán Mac Diarmada, Carrick-on-Shannon; Referee: L. Devenny

24/03/12; Round 6	London	0-12 – 0-17	Clare	Emerald GAA Grounds, Ruislip
24/03/12; Round 6	L Colfer (0-4), E O'Neill (0-3), L Mulvey (0-2), J Scanlon (0-1), P McDermott (0-1), S McVeigh (0-1)	Report	D Tubridy (0-7), S McGrath (0-3), G Brennan (0-2), L Healy (0-2), M O'Shea (0-2), D Russell (0-1)	Emerald GAA Grounds, Ruislip

24/03/12; Round 6	Carlow	0-10 – 1-9	Wicklow	Dr. Cullen Park, Carlow; Referee: P Neilan
24/03/12; Round 6	Brian Murphy (0-1), P Reid (0-1)	Report	T Hannon (1-6), D Healy (0-1), L Glynn (0-1), M McLoughlin (0-1)	Dr. Cullen Park, Carlow; Referee: P Neilan

31/03/12; Round 7	Waterford	0-12 – 1-15	Carlow	Fraher Field, Dungarvan; Referee: C Lane (Cork)
31/03/12; Round 7	G. Hurney (0-8), P. Hurney (0-2), S. O'Hare (0-1), T. Grey (0-1)	Report	Brendan Murphy (1-1), Brian Murphy (0-3), JJ Smith (0-3), K. Jackson (0-2), E. Finnegan (0-1), P. Reid (0-1)	Fraher Field, Dungarvan; Referee: C Lane (Cork)

01/04/12; Round 7	Wicklow	2-13 – 1-10	Leitrim	Aughrim County Ground, Aughrim; Referee: F Barry
01/04/12; Round 7	T Hannon (1-2), D O'Sullivan (1-1), R Finn (0-3), D Hayden (0-2), J Stafford (0-2), D Healy (0-1), F Clune (0-1), S Furlong (0-1)	Report	E Mulligan (0-4), P McGowan (1-1), W McKeon (0-3), C Sheridan (0-1), P Maguire (0-1)	Aughrim County Ground, Aughrim; Referee: F Barry

01/04/12; Round 7	Kilkenny	0-4 – 4-30	London	Páirc Lachtain, Freshford; Referee: B Tyrrell
01/04/12; Round 7	M Malone (0-2), D Prendergast (0-1), R O'Hara (0-1)	Report	L Colfer (2-9), E O'Neill (1-4), K O'Leary (1-1), L Mulvey (0-3), M Gottsche (0-3), C McCallion (0-2), M Mullins (0-2), P McGoldrick (0-2), S Hannon (0-2), S Doolin (0-1), S Kelly (0-1)	Páirc Lachtain, Freshford; Referee: B Tyrrell

01/04/12; Round 7	Fermanagh	0-13 – 1-10	Limerick	Brewster Park, Enniskillen; Referee: F Flynn
01/04/12; Round 7	Seamus Quigley (0-3), T Corrigan (0-3), C Quigley (0-2), S McCabe (0-2), D Kelly (0-1), R Jones (0-1), T McElroy (0-1)	Report	G Collins (1-1), B Scanlon (0-3), I Ryan (0-2), E O'Connor (0-1), J Galvin (0-1), J Mullane (0-1), S Lavin (0-1)	Brewster Park, Enniskillen; Referee: F Flynn

08/04/12; Round 8	Carlow	0-8 – 1-16	Fermanagh	Dr. Cullen Park, Carlow; Referee: F Kelly
08/04/12; Round 8	Brian Murphy (0-2), Brendan Murphy (0-1), D Hayden (0-1)	Report	D Kille (0-7), T Corrigan (1-3), B Mulrone (0-2), C Quigley (0-1), E Donnelly (0-1), E Maguire (0-1), P Ward (0-1)	Dr. Cullen Park, Carlow; Referee: F Kelly

08/04/12; Round 8	London	0-12 – 1-16	Wicklow	Emerald GAA Grounds, Ruislip; Referee: E O'Grady
08/04/12; Round 8	P McGoldrick (0-5), E O'Neill (0-2), M Gottsche (0-2), L Colfer (0-1), M Mullins (0-1), S Doolan (0-1)	Report	S Furlong (0-6), L Glynn (1-2), T Hannon (0-4), R Finn (0-2), J McGrath (0-1), M McLoughlin (0-1)	Emerald GAA Grounds, Ruislip; Referee: E O'Grady

08/04/12; Round 8	Leitrim	0-14 – 1-8	Waterford	Páirc Seán Mac Diarmada, Carrick-on-Shannon; Referee: S Carroll
08/04/12; Round 8	E Mulligan (0-8), R Lowe (0-3), R Cox (0-2), S Moran (0-1), W McKeon (0-1)	Report	C McGrath (0-2), M Ferncombe (0-2), S Briggs (0-2), E Walsh (0-1), S O'Hare (0-1)	Páirc Seán Mac Diarmada, Carrick-on-Shannon; Referee: S Carroll

08/04/12; Round 8	Clare	2-29 – 1-4	Kilkenny	Cusack Park, Ennis; Referee: P Neilan
08/04/12; Round 8	D Tubridy (0-9), S McGrath (0-6), M O'Shea (0-4), M Foran (1-1), D O'Neill (1-0), D Daly (0-2), G Quinlan (0-2), N Browne (0-2), D Russell (0-1), G Brennan (0-1), S Brennan (0-1)	Report	M Malone (1-2), C Tyler (0-1), J Grennan (0-1)	Cusack Park, Ennis; Referee: P Neilan

15/04/12; Round 9	Fermanagh	2-15 – 0-7	Leitrim	Brewster Park, Enniskillen; Referee: S McLaughan
15/04/12; Round 9	Seamus Quigley (2-6), D Keenan (0-2), D Kille (0-2), R Jones (0-2), E Donnelly (0-1), P Ward (0-1), S McCabe (0-1)	Report	E Mulligan (0-3), S Moran (0-2), K Conlon (0-1), W McKeon (0-1)	Brewster Park, Enniskillen; Referee: S McLaughan

15/04/12; Round 9	Waterford	0-9 – 0-9	London	Fraher Field, Dungarvan; Attendance: 49; Referee: K O'Brien
15/04/12; Round 9	M Ferncombe (0-6), JJ Hutchinson (0-1), S Fleming (0-1), S O'Hare (0-1)	Report	L Colfer (0-3), K O'Leary (0-2), S Kelly (0-2), S McVeigh (0-2), L Mulvey (0-1), P McGoldrick (0-1)	Fraher Field, Dungarvan; Attendance: 49; Referee: K O'Brien

15/04/12; Round 9	Limerick	0-19 – 1-9	Carlow	Gaelic Grounds, Limerick; Referee: D Corcoran
15/04/12; Round 9	I Ryan (0-6), G Collins (0-4), D Treacy (0-3), S Lavin (0-2), B Scanlon (0-1), G O'Connell (0-1), J Riordan (0-1), P Ranahan (0-1)	Report	C Murphy (0-4), S Gannon (1-0), K Jackson (0-2), Brendan Murphy (0-1), Brian Murphy (0-1)	Gaelic Grounds, Limerick; Referee: D Corcoran

15/04/12; Round 9	Wicklow	1-15 – 1-12	Clare	Aughrim County Ground, Aughrim; Referee: C Lane
15/04/12; Round 9	T Hannon (0-7), D Hayden (1-1), D Healy (0-2), L Glynn (0-2), S Furlong (0-2), J McGrath (0-1)	Report	D Tubridy (0-7), R Donnelly (1-1), S McGrath (0-2), G Brennan (0-1), S Brennan (0-1)	Aughrim County Ground, Aughrim; Referee: C Lane

=== Division 4 final ===
28/04/12; 17:00	Wicklow	2-16 – 1-11	Fermanagh	Croke Park, Dublin; Attendance: 7,514^{4} Referee: F Kelly
28/04/12; 17:00	S Furlong (1-5), T Hannon (0-4), R Finn (0-3), C Hyland (1-0), J Stafford (0-2), L Glynn (0-2)	Report	T Corrigan (0-3), E Donnelly (1-0), S Quigley (0-2), B Mulrone (0-1), C Quigley (0-1), D Keenan (0-1), D Kille (0-1), E Maguire (0-1), P Ward (0-1)	Croke Park, Dublin; Attendance: 7,514^{4} Referee: F Kelly

^{4}Attendance figure is total of the Division 3 and Division 4 finals played consecutively

== Statistics ==
- All scores correct as of 26 March 2016

=== Scoring ===
- Widest winning margin: 46
  - Kilkenny 0-4 - 9-23 Fermanagh (Division 4)
- Most goals in a match: 9
  - Kilkenny 0-4 - 9-23 Fermanagh (Division 4)
- Most points in a match: 39
  - Monaghan 2-24 - 1-15 Louth (Division 2)
- Most goals by one team in a match: 9
  - Kilkenny 0-4 - 9-23 Fermanagh (Division 4)
- Highest aggregate score: 54 points
  - Kilkenny 0-4 - 9-23 Fermanagh (Division 4)
- Lowest aggregate score: 16 points
  - Donegal 1-7 - 0-6 Cork (Division 1)
  - London 0-4 - 2-6 Carlow (Division 4)

=== Top scorers ===
Overall

Rank	Player	County	Tally	Total	Matches	Average
1	Seamus Quigley	Fermanagh	5-43	58	9	6.4
2	Ian Ryan	Limerick	2-49	55	8	6.9
3	David Tubridy	Clare	0-48	45	8	6.0
4	Sean McCormack	Longford	0-45	45	6	7.5
4	Bryan Sheehan	Kerry	1-42	45	8	5.6
6	Adrian Marren	Sligo	6-25	43	6	7.2
7	Tony Hannon	Wicklow	3-33	42	9	4.7
8	Darren Clarke	Louth	1-37	40	7	5.7
9	Seanie Furlong	Wicklow	2-32	38	9	4.2
9	Barry Grogan	Tipperary	0-38	38	6	6.3
11	Conor Mortimer	Mayo	0-36	36	9	4
12	Paul Finlay	Monaghan	1-31	34	7	4.9
13	Gary Hurney	Waterford	0-33	33	7	4.7
13	Ciarán Lyng	Wexford	2-27	33	7	4.7
13	Diarmuid Connolly	Dublin	4-21	33	7	4.7
16	Tomas McCann	Antrim	2-24	30	7	4.3
17	Emlyn Mulligan	Leitrim	2-23	29	4	7.2

Single game

Rank	Player	County	Tally	Total	Opposition
1	Seamus Quigley	Fermanagh	2-12	18	Kilkenny
2	Lloyd Colfer	London	2-9	15	Kilkenny
3	Emlyn Mulligan	Leitrim	2-8	14	Kilkenny
3	Adrian Marren	Sligo	3-5	14	Wexford
5	Seamus Quigley	Fermanagh	2-6	12	Leitrim
5	Diarmuid Connolly	Dublin	3-3	12	Armagh
7	Darren Clarke	Louth	0-11	11	Kildare
8	Brian Cox	Fermanagh	0-10	10	Wicklow
8	Sean McCormack	Longford	0-10	10	Offaly
8	Sean McCormack	Longford	0-10	10	Sligo
8	Ian Ryan	Limerick	1-7	10	Waterford
8	Ian Ryan	Limerick	1-7	10	Kilkenny
8	Brian Kavanagh	Longford	1-7	10	Wexford
8	Darren Clarke	Louth	1-7	10	Derry
8	Joe Kelly	Wicklow	1-7	10	Kilkenny
8	Martin Dunne	Cavan	2-4	10	Tipperary

Preceded by 2011 National Football League	National Football League; 1926 – present	Succeeded by 2013 National Football League
