= Aaron Hoey =

Irish Gaelic footballer

Personal information
- Native name: Aaron Ó hEochaidh (Irish)
- Born: 13 July 1977 (age 49) Knockbridge, County Louth
- Occupation: Garda
- Height: 5 ft 10 in (178 cm)

Sport
- Sport: Gaelic football
- Position: Full-back
Clubs
- Years: Club
- St Brides; Naomh Moninne; Knockbridge Hurling Club
Club titles
- Louth titles: 0
- Leinster titles: 0
- All-Ireland Titles: 0
Inter-county
- Years: County
- 1997-2013: Louth
Inter-county titles
- All-Irelands: 0
- NFL: 3

Aaron Hoey is a retired Gaelic footballer and hurler from County Louth, Ireland. He played with Louth, St Brides and Knockbridge Hurling Club. He was part of the Louth team that played in the final of the Leinster Senior Football Championship in 2010 where he appeared as a sub, but were beaten in controversial circumstances by Meath.

Hoey was a member of the Garda College side that lost the Final of the 1998/99 Sigerson Cup to Tralee IT.

In 2002, Hoey scored 1–07 in the semi-final of the Louth Senior Football Championship against Dundalk Gaels, helping St Bride's to reach their first county senior final in almost sixty years. Mattock Rangers proved too strong in the final, as St Bride's lost out by three points despite Hoey contributing 0–10.

At the age of 43, he appeared as a substitute in the final of the 2020 Louth Intermediate Football Championship, scoring 0–01 as St Bride's defeated Kilkerley Emmets.

In addition to his football achievements, Hoey won several Louth Senior Hurling Championship and League medals with Dundalk side Naomh Moninne and later Knockbridge Hurling Club.

== Honours ==
- 1997 All-Ireland Senior B Football Championship
- 1999-2000 National Football League Division 2
- Railway Cup : 2002
- 2006 National Football League Division 2
- 2006 Tommy Murphy Cup
- 2009 O'Byrne Cup
- 2011 National Football League Division 3
- Louth Intermediate Football Championship : 2020

Preceded by Martin Farrelly	Louth Senior Football Captain; 2003	Succeeded by Ollie McDonnell
