= 2006 Tommy Murphy Cup =

Tournament details
- Date: 22 July 2006 — 27 August 2006
- Teams: 13

Winners
- Champions: Louth (1st win)
- Manager: Eamonn McEneaney
- Captain: Martin Farrelly

Runners-up
- Runners-up: Leitrim
- Manager: Dessie Dolan
- Captain: Dermot Reynolds

The Tommy Murphy Cup 2006 began on July 22, 2006. It was the third year that this element of the Bank of Ireland Football Championship was played.

== Teams ==
=== General information ===
Thirteen counties competed in the Tommy Murphy Cup:

| County | Last Cup title | Last Provincial Title | Last All-Ireland Title | Position in 2005 Championship | Appearance |
|---|---|---|---|---|---|
| Antrim | — | 1951 | — | Quarter-finals | 3rd |
| Carlow | — | 1944 | — | Preliminary round | 2nd |
| Cavan | — | 1997 | 1952 | Round 4 (All-Ireland SFC) | 1st |
| Clare | 2004 | 1992 | — | Round 3 (All-Ireland SFC) | 2nd |
| Kilkenny | — | 1911 | — | Preliminary round | 2nd |
| Leitrim | — | 1994 | — | Preliminary round | 2nd |
| London | — | — | — | Quarter-finals | 3rd |
| Louth | — | 1957 | 1957 | Round 3 (All-Ireland SFC) | 2nd |
| Monaghan | — | 1988 | — | Round 4 (All-Ireland SFC) | 1st |
| Tipperary | 2005 | 1935 | 1920 | Champions | 2nd |
| Roscommon | — | 2001 | 1944 | Semi-finals | 2nd |
| Waterford | — | 1898 | — | Quarter-finals | 2nd |
| Wicklow | — | — | — | Preliminary round | 2nd |

== Results ==
| Game | Date | Venue | Winner | Score | Loser | Score |
|---|---|---|---|---|---|---|
| Preliminary | July 22 | Dr Cullen Park, Carlow | Carlow | 1-10 | Wicklow | 0-11 |
| Preliminary | July 22 | Dungarvan | Tipperary | 0-12 | Waterford | 1-07 |
| Preliminary | July 23 | Casement Park, Belfast | Antrim | 1-23 | Kilkenny | 1-08 |
| Preliminary | July 25 | Kingspan Breffni Park, Cavan | Cavan | 2-12 | Roscommon | 0-14 |
| Preliminary | July 25 | Cusack Park, Ennis | Louth | 2-14 | Clare | 3-09 |
| Quarter-Final | July 29 | Semple Stadium, Thurles | Leitrim | 0-14 | Tipperary | 1-06 |
| Quarter-Final | July 29 | Casement Park, Belfast | Antrim | 2-14 | Cavan | 2-09 |
| Quarter-Final | July 29 | Dr Cullen Park, Carlow | Carlow | 1-11 | London | 0-07 |
| Quarter-Final | August 4 | Dundalk | Louth | 3-13 | Monaghan | 1-13 |
| Semi-Final | August 12 | Dundalk | Louth | 0-22 | Antrim | 0-08 |
| Semi-Final | August 13 | Birr | Leitrim | 2-12 | Carlow | 0-08 |

== Final ==
27 August 2006
2pm

| Louth | 3-14–1-11 | Leitrim |
|---|---|---|
| Clarke (0-7, 1f), Lennon (1-1), White (1-1), Rooney (1-0), Carroll (0-2), Keenan (0-1), Finnegan (0-1), Mark Brennan (0-1) | | Duignan (0-6f), Maxwell (0-3), Doonan (1-0), Prior (0-1), Glancy (0-1) |

Croke Park, Dublin
Referee: J. McKee (Armagh)

| GK | 1 | Stuart Reynolds (O'Connells) |
| RCB | 2 | David Brennan (Mattock Rangers) |
| FB | 3 | Colin Goss (St Patrick's) |
| LCB | 4 | John O'Brien (Seán O'Mahony's) |
| RHB | 5 | Peter McGinnity (Dundalk Gaels) |
| CHB | 6 | Mick Fanning (Naomh Máirtín) |
| LHB | 7 | Ray Finnegan (St Patrick's) |
| MF | 8 | Martin Farrelly (St Joseph's) |
| MF | 9 | Paddy Keenan (St Patrick's) |
| RHF | 10 | Brian White (Cooley Kickhams) |
| CHF | 11 | Mark Brennan (Mattock Rangers) |
| LHF | 12 | Ronan Carroll (St Mary's) |
| RCF | 13 | Darren Clarke (St Mary's) |
| FF | 14 | Shane Lennon (Kilkerley Emmets) |
| LCF | 15 | JP Rooney (Naomh Máirtín) |
Substitutes:
| | 16 | Alan Page (Cooley Kickhams) for Goss |
| | 17 | Mark Stanfield (Killeavy, Armagh) for Lennon |
| | 18 | Christy Grimes (Mattock Rangers) for Farrelly |
| | 19 | Trevor O'Brien (Glyde Rangers) for White |
| | 20 | Colm Judge (Newtown Blues) for Clarke |

| GK | 1 | Cathal McCrann (Gortletteragh) |
| RCB | 2 | Dermot Reynolds (St Mary's) |
| FB | 3 | John McKeon (Drumreilly) |
| LCB | 4 | Michael McGuinness (Mohill) |
| RHB | 5 | Barry McWeeney (Aughnasheelin) |
| CHB | 6 | Francis Holohan (Drumreilly) |
| LHB | 7 | Shane Foley (Kiltubrid) |
| MF | 8 | Gary McCloskey (Bornacoola) |
| MF | 9 | Chris Carroll (Kiltubrid) |
| RHF | 10 | Colin Regan (Melvin Gaels) |
| CHF | 11 | Michael Foley (Drumkeerin) |
| LHF | 12 | Barry Prior (Aughawillan) |
| RCF | 13 | James Glancy (St Mary's) |
| FF | 14 | Donal Brennan (Cloone) |
| LCF | 15 | Ciarán Duignan (Fenagh St Caillin's) |
Substitutes:
| | 16 | Declan Maxwell (Drumreilly) for Regan |
| | 17 | David McHugh (Annaduff) for Foley |
| | 18 | Noel Doonan (Carrigallen) for Carroll |
| | 19 | Ronan Gallagher (Mohill) for Glancy |
| | 20 | Michael Greene (St Mary's) for McWeeney |
