= 2007 All-Ireland Junior Football Championship =

All Ireland Champions
- Winners: Cork (14 win)
- Captain: Barry Goggin
- Manager: Mossie Barrett

All Ireland Runners-up
- Runners-up: Wexford
- Captain: Anthony Masterson
- Manager: Paul Bealin

Provincial Champions
- Munster: Cork
- Leinster: Wexford
- Ulster: Not Played
- Connacht: Mayo

The 2007 All-Ireland Junior Football Championship was the 77th staging of the All-Ireland Junior Football Championship since its establishment by the Gaelic Athletic Association in 1912.

Kerry entered the championship as the defending champions, however, they were beaten by Clare in the Munster semi-finals.

The All-Ireland final was played on 27 July 2007 at Fraher Field in Dungarvan, between Cork and Wexford, in what was their second meeting in the final overall and a first meeting in 15 years. Cork won the match by 1–14 to 3–02 to claim their 14th championship title overall and a first title in two years.

== Connacht Junior Football Championship ==
=== Connacht final ===
20 May 2007 Final	Mayo	3-10 - 2-07	Sligo	Pearse Stadium
	P Barrett 1-1, A Costello 1-1 (1-0 pen), R McNamara 0-3 (2f), R Hannick 0-3, N Connelly 1-0, O Feeney, J Rafter 0-1 each.	Report	S Coen 1-3 (1f), J Scanlon 0-3 (1f), F Quinn 1-0, K Langan 0-1.

== Leinster Junior Football Championship ==
=== Leinster quarter-finals ===
30 May 2007 Quarter-final	Dublin	1-11 - 0-12	Louth

30 May 2007 Quarter-final	Meath	2-12 - 1-14	Kildare

6 June 2007 Quarter-final	Wexford	3-18 - 1-10	Kilkenny

=== Leinster semi-finals ===
13 June 2007 Semi-final	Dublin	0-16 - 1-07	Wicklow

13 June 2007 Semi-final	Wexford	0-16 - 2-09	Meath

=== Leinster final ===
27 June 2007 Final	Wexford	1-10 - 1-08	Dublin	Wexford Park
	P Byrne 1-1; P Sinnott 0-6 (3f); D Farrell (f), W Hudson, P Atkinson 0-1 each.	Report	G Cullen 1-0; K Leahy 0-4f; M Forde, K Kavanagh, D Kelly, B O'Hanlon 0-1 each.

== Munster Junior Football Championship ==
=== Munster quarter-finals ===
20 May 2007 Quarter-final	Waterford	0-07 - 1-11	Clare	Fraher Field
	C Power 0-5, T Whelan 0-1, T Kirwan 0-1.		D Tubridy 0-7, JP O'Neill 1-0, S Hickey 0-3, N Kennedy 0-1.

20 May 2007 Quarter-final	Cork	1-13 - 1-12	Limerick	Páirc Uí Chaoimh
	P Dunlea 1-2, H Curran 0-2, V Hurley 0-2, F Lynch 0-2, J Russell 0-1, D Carey 0-1, P Kissane 0-1, M O'Driscoll 0-1, N O'Sullivan 0-1.		P Donnelly 0-4, M Scannell 1-0, T Collins 0-2, S Kelly 0-2, S Fox 0-2, M McMahon 0-1, S Walsh 0-1.

=== Munster semi-finals ===
3 June 2007 Semi-final	Clare	0-08 - 0-05	Kerry	Fraher Field
	D Tubridy 0-7 (0-5f), S Mead 0-1.	Report	L Sheehan 0-3f, J Egan and B Scanlon 0-1 each.

3 June 2007 Semi-final	Cork	1-15 - 1-09	Tipperary	Gaelic Grounds
	P Lynch 0-7, N O'Sullivan 1-0, J Russell 0-2, P Dunlea 0-2, V Hurley 0-2, C Curran 0-1, P Cahill 0-1.		O Lloyd 1-2, T Dalton 0-4, E O'Brien 0-1, T Doyle 0-1, P Kennedy 0-1.

=== Munster final ===
28 June 2007 Final	Cork	0-12 - 0-07	Clare	Gaelic Grounds
	F Dunlea 0-7 (2f), F Lynch 0-2 (1f), V Hurley, A O'Sullivan, N O'Sullivan 0-1.	Report	D Tubridy 0-6 (3f), M Liddane 0-3, M Tubridy, S Hickey 0-1.

== All-Ireland Junior Football Championship ==
=== All-Ireland semi-finals ===
15 July 2007 Semi-final	Cork	2-23 - 0-07	London	Páirc Uí Chaoimh
	P Dunlea 0-8 (0-7 frees), C Keane 1-1, S O’Sullivan 1-0, C Brosnan 0-3, A O’Sullivan, P Kissane, F Lynch 0-2 each, M Fehily, V Hurley, L Dennehy, P Cahill, B Goggin 0-1 each.	Report	F McMahon (0-1 free), O Towey, A Dillane 0-2 each, N Roche 0-1.

15 July 2007 Semi-final	Wexford	2-14 - 1-12	Mayo	O'Connor Park
	P Sinnott 0-7 (0-6f, 0-1 '45'), W Hudson 1-1, J Waters 1-0, M Flynn O'Connor 0-2 (0-1f), D Foran 0-2, J O'Shaughnessy, P Hughes 0-1 each.	Report	P Doherty 1-4 (0-1f), A Costello 0-4 (0-1f), R McNamara 0-2 (0-2f), R Hannick, N Connelly 0-1 each.

=== All-Ireland final ===
27 July 2007 Final	Cork	1-14 - 3-02	Wexford	Croke Park
	P Dunlea 0-6 (frees); F Lynch 1-2; V Hurley, A O’Sullivan 0-2 each; N O’Sullivan, C Brosnan 0-1 each.	Report	D Foran 2-0; P Murphy 1-0; P Sinnott (free), P Atkinson 0-1 each.
