= 2009 Dublin county football team season =

The following is a summary of Dublin county football team's 2009 season.

== O'Byrne Cup ==
2009 O'Byrne Cup

Round 1

Dublin	0-15 – 1-07	Offaly
D Byrne 0-5 (0-3f), J OBrien (0-4f), A Relihan 0-3, D Lally, G Smith 0-1 each.		T Deehan 1-1, R Guinan 0-3 (0-2f, 0-1 45), N Smith, C Carroll, N Coughlan 0-1 each.

Tullamore
Attendance: ?
Referee: M Deegan (Laois)
