= Dunnion =

Dunnion is a surname. Notable people with the surname include:

- Barry Dunnion, Irish sportsperson
- Kristyn Dunnion (born 1969), Canadian fiction writer and performance artist
