= Shane Lennon =

Irish Gaelic footballer

Personal information
- Born: c. 1985 County Louth
- Height: 6 ft 1 in (185 cm)

Sport
- Sport: Gaelic football
- Position: Full-forward
Club
- Years: Club
- Kilkerley Emmets
Inter-county
- Years: County
- 2005-2014: Louth
Inter-county titles
- Leinster titles: 0
- All-Irelands: 0

Shane Lennon is a former Gaelic footballer who played as a forward for his local club Kilkerley Emmets and the Louth county team.

He lined out at full-forward for the Louth team in the final of the Leinster Senior Football Championship in 2010, as they lost in controversial circumstances to Meath. He helped Louth win a Tommy Murphy Cup, two National League titles and an O'Byrne Cup.

During his inter-county playing career, Lennon was appointed county Games Development Manager by Louth GAA. He departed this role in 2023.

He scored the winning point for UCD in the final of the 2006 Dublin Senior Football Championship against St Vincent's.

He was educated at Coláiste Rís.

== Honours ==
- National Football League Division 2 (1): 2006
- Tommy Murphy Cup (1): 2006
- National Football League Division 3 (1): 2011
- O'Byrne Cup (1): 2009
- Dublin Senior Football Championship (1): 2006
- McGeough Cup (1): 2011
- Louth Intermediate Football Championship (1): 2015
- Louth Intermediate Football League (1): 2002
- Paddy Sheelan Shield (1): 2019
