= 1910 Leinster Junior Football Championship =

Provincial gaelic football tournament

Championship details

Champions
- Winning team: Louth (1st win)
- Captain: Joe Johnston

Finalists
- Runners-Up: Laois

The 1910 Leinster Junior Football Championship was the sixth staging of the Leinster Junior Football Championship, the second-tier provincial competition that was launched in 1905 by Leinster GAA.

The final was played at Jones's Road in Dublin, between Louth and Laois. Louth won the match by four points and in doing so became junior football champions of Leinster for the first time. As the inaugural All-Ireland Junior Football Championship did not take place until 1912, Louth did not compete against the provincial champions of Connacht, Munster or Ulster.

== Early rounds ==
Wexford	0-00 - CONC	Wicklow	Wexford Park

8 May	Laois	2-04 - 0-00	Kilkenny	Maryborough

15 May	Louth	0-12 - 0-00	Meath	Drogheda

15 May	Carlow	2-09 - 0-03	Kildare	Carlow

17 July	Dublin	2-16 - 1-02	Offaly	Maryborough

24 July	Louth	0-11 - 0-06	Dublin	Athletic Grounds, Dundalk

4 September	Carlow	1-04 - 0-04	Wexford	Jones's Road

== Semi-Finals ==
11 September	Laois	1-02 - 0-02	Westmeath	Maryborough

25 September	Louth	3-03 - 3-02	Carlow	Jones's Road

== Final ==
6 November	Louth	1-05 - 1-01	Laois	Jones's Road
				Referee: Dan McCarthy (Dublin)

1	Larry Feehan (Dundalk Young Irelands) (gk)
2	Peter McArdle (Dundalk Rangers)
3	T. Phillips (Dundalk Rangers)
4	John Hearty (Dundalk Young Irelands)
5	Jim Lennon (Geraldines)
6	Matt Conachy (Geraldines)
7	John Byrne (Geraldines)
8	Joe McGuinness (Geraldines)
9	Richard McCoy (Dundalk Rangers)
10	Paddy McElroy (Geraldines)
11	Joe Johnston (Geraldines) (c)
12	Larry Soraghan (Geraldines)
13	Pat McGuinness (Geraldines)
14	Willie Goggan (Dundalk Rangers)
15	Pat Magee (Dundalk Rangers)
16	Tom McDonald (Tredaghs)
17	John Dullaghan (Dundalk Young Irelands)

1	W. Kelly
2	E. Corcoran
3	E. Boland
4	J. Corcoran
5	T. Brazil
6	S. O'Neill
7	J. O'Neill
8	J. Bergin
9	J. Connell
10	W. Nerney
11	J. Murphy
12	S. Reilly
13	W. Bannon
14	J. McKenna
15	F. Killeen
16	C. McEvoy
17	J. Leavy
