= Ronan Carroll =

Irish Gaelic footballer

Personal information
- Native name: Rónán Ó Cearbhaill (Irish)
- Born: Drogheda, Ireland

Sport
- Sport: Gaelic Football
- Position: Midfield
Club
- Years: Club
- St Mary's
Inter-county
- Years: County
- 2004-2013: Louth
Inter-county titles
- NFL: 2

Ronan Carroll is an Irish sportsperson. He plays Gaelic football with his local club St Mary's and was a member of the senior Louth county team from 2004 until 2013. He was part of the team that won the 2006 Tommy Murphy Cup and NFL Division 3. He scored the only goal of the League final.

== Honours ==
County

- National Football League Division 2 (1): 2006
- National Football League Division 3 (1): 2011
- Tommy Murphy Cup (1): 2006
- O'Byrne Cup (1): 2009
- Owen Treacy Cup (1): 2006

Club

- Louth Senior Football Championship (2): 2022, 2023
- Cardinal O'Donnell Cup (3): 2002, 2021, 2024,
- Paddy Sheelan Cup (3): 2016, 2018, 2021
- Louth Senior Football League Division 1B (1): 2004
