= Gerard Hoey =

Irish Gaelic footballer

Personal information
- Native name: Gearóid Ó hEochaidh (Irish)
- Born: Haggardstown, County Louth
- Height: 5 ft 9 in (175 cm)

Sport
- Sport: Gaelic football
- Position: half-back
Club
- Years: Club
- Geraldines
Club titles
- Louth titles: 0
- Leinster titles: 0
- All-Ireland Titles: 0
Inter-county
- Years: County
- 2009-2013: Louth
Inter-county titles
- NFL: 1 (Div 3)

Gerard Hoey (born 1989) is a retired Gaelic footballer from County Louth, Ireland. He played with the Louth senior team and for his local club Geraldines of Haggardstown, located on the outskirts of Dundalk.

Hoey became a member of the Louth senior panel in 2009. He won O'Byrne Cup and National League medals during his inter-county career.

== Honours ==
County

- National Football League Division 3 (1): 2011
- O'Byrne Cup (1): 2009

Club

- Leinster Intermediate Club Football Championship (1): 2013
- Louth Intermediate Football Championship (1): 2013
- Louth Intermediate Football League (1): 2013
- Louth Under-21 Football Championship (1): 2009
- Louth Minor Football Championship (1): 2007,
- Louth Minor B Football Championship (1): 2006
