= Brendan Boyle (Gaelic footballer) =

Irish Gaelic footballer

Sport
- Sport: Gaelic football
- Position: Midfield
Club
- Years: Club
- ?–?: Ard an Rátha
Inter-county
- Years: County
- 200?–?: Donegal

Brendan Boyle is an Irish former Gaelic footballer who played at midfield for Ard an Rátha and also for the Donegal county team.

A married civil engineer and graduate of Institute of Technology, Sligo, he spent two years with a serious back injury and almost quit the game. His wife Donna (née Dunnion) played for Four Masters (she was a sister of Barry Dunnion) but died following an illness at the age of 41 in February 2022, leaving him two children.

His championship debut was in the 2002 Ulster Senior Football Championship final, a competition he would never win as a player.

He made a substitute appearance for Stephen McDermott in the 2003 All-Ireland Senior Football Championship semi-final against Armagh.

In 2004, he played against Armagh in the Ulster SFC final at Croke Park.

He was injured in a club game and unable to play in what proved to be Brian McEniff's last game as county team manager the next day, a one-point loss to Cavan in a 2005 All-Ireland Senior Football Championship Round 2 Qualifier.

In 2009, he played in the Championship victory over Galway at Markievicz Park and the defeat to Cork at Croke Park.
