= JP Rooney =

Irish Gaelic footballer (born 1979)

Personal information
- Born: 27 August 1979 County Louth
- Height: 5 ft 10 in (178 cm)

Sport
- Sport: Gaelic Football
- Position: Full Forward
Club
- Years: Club
- 1997-2020: Naomh Máirtín
Inter-county
Years	County	Apps (scores)
1999-2012	Louth	15-74
Inter-county titles
- Leinster titles: 0
- All-Irelands: 0
- NFL: 0
- All Stars: 0

J P Rooney (John Paul) is an Irish former Gaelic footballer from Monasterboice in County Louth, Ireland, who played with and his local club side Naomh Máirtín and the Louth senior team. He also represented his province in the 2002 Railway Cup.

He received the Drogheda Independent/Drogheda Concentrates Sportstar of the Year Award for 2000.

Rooney lined out at left corner-forward on the Louth team that played in the final of the 2010 Leinster Senior Football Championship. He contributed 1-1 as the Wee County lost in controversial circumstances to Meath. His inter-county career came to an end in 2012, having played in 38 Championship games for Louth.

In 2020 at the age of 40, Rooney appeared as a substitute for Naomh Máirtín in the Louth Senior Football Championship final, helping his club win the Joe Ward Cup for the first time in its history. He won a second county championship medal a year later, as Naomh Máirtín retained their title by beating opponents St Mochta's.

== Honours ==
County

- National Football League Division 2 (2): 1999-2000, 2006
- Railway Cup (1) : 2002
- 2006 Tommy Murphy Cup (1): 2006
- O'Byrne Cup (1): 2009
- National Football League Division 3 (1): 2011

Club

- Louth Senior Football Championship (2): 2020, 2021
- Cardinal O'Donnell Cup (2) 2017, 2019
- Louth Senior Football League Division 1B (1): 2006
- Paddy Sheelan Shield (1): 2012
