= Martin Farrelly =

Irish Gaelic footballer

Personal information
- Born: 1974 or 1975 (age 51–52)

Sport
- Sport: Gaelic football
- Position: Midfielder
Clubs
- Years: Club
- Lann Léire; St Joseph's
Inter-county
- Years: County
- Louth

Martin Farrelly is an Irish former Gaelic footballer who played as a midfielder for Lann Léire, St Joseph's and the Louth county team.

Farrelly won the 1999–2000 National League Division 2 title while playing for Louth. He was Louth captain in 2002. He later captained Louth to both the 2006 National League Division 2 title and the 2006 Tommy Murphy Cup. Injury forced him to retire from inter-county football and from the sport entirely in 2007. He also won the Railway Cup while playing inter-provincial football for Leinster.
