= Eamonn McEneaney =

Irish Gaelic footballer and manager

Eamon McEneaney
Personal information
- Nickname: Mac
- Born: County Monaghan
- Height: 6 ft 1 in (185 cm)

Sport
- Sport: Gaelic football
- Position: Forward
Club
- Years: Club
- 1971–1997: Castleblayney Faughs
Club titles
- Monaghan titles: 7
- Ulster titles: 2
- All-Ireland Titles: 0
Inter-county
- Years: County
- 1979–1992: Monaghan
Inter-county titles
- Ulster titles: 3
- All-Irelands: 0
- NFL: 1
- All Stars: 0

Eamon McEneaney is an Irish former Gaelic football manager and player for the Castleblayney Faughs club and at senior level for the Monaghan county team.

McEneaney won the National Football League in 1985 while playing for Monaghan. He captained his club to two Ulster Senior Club Football Championship titles in 1986 and 1991.

In retirement, McEneaney managed the Louth county team between 2006 and 2009, winning the 2009 O'Byrne Cup. He then managed the senior Monaghan county team from 2010 until 2012.

== Playing career ==
As a player with Monaghan, McEneaney won three Ulster Senior Football Championship titles: in 1979, 1985 and 1988. He also won an U-21 title as a player in 1981 and as manager of Monaghan U-21's in 1999. He captained his club Castleblayney Faughs to two Ulster Senior Club Football Championship titles in 1986 and 1991.

== Coaching career ==
McEneaney managed Monaghan in a joint capacity with former GAA president Seán McCague in 1997 and then on his own in 1998 and 1999, winning an All-Ireland Senior B Football Championship title in 1998. He subsequently had a spell in charge of Louth from 2006 to 2009, guiding them to a Division 2 league title, the 2009 O'Byrne Cup and a first Leinster Junior Football Championship title since 1966.

McEneaney succeeded Séamus McEnaney as manager of the Monaghan senior football team in October 2010, after McEnaney declined to put his name forward for the role he had held for the previous six years. The Monaghan County Board decided in August 2010 that McEnaney would be forced to go through the nomination process after a poor finish to the 2010 All-Ireland Senior Football Championship (SFC).

In July 2012, McEneaney left his role as Monaghan manager after an All-Ireland SFC qualifier defeat to Laois. He said:

I've thought about it long and hard quite a while ago and I indicated to the county chairman that even if we got to the Ulster final and won it I wouldn't be going on next year or the year after. It is a long-term job in my opinion now and what I've seen over the last 12 months is it needs some to take it on over the next three or four years. I'm just not in a position to do that. I have a family and my own lad playing senior inter-county football and I have to go one way and he is going another on a Sunday morning. It'd be nice to go and relax and go and support him. It'd be nice to go to Monaghan games as well and support them because I've given them 20 years as a manager and player and I think that is as much as I can give. It is with a heavy heart that I do it because they are a great bunch of lads. I can't thank them enough for all they have given me. I can't thank the Monaghan supporters enough for the support they have given us and unfortunately we have not been able to deliver on the field.

== Playing honours ==
Inter-county

- Ulster Senior Football Championship (3): 1979, 1985, 1988
- National Football League (1): 1985
- Dr McKenna Cup (3): 1979, 1980, 1983
- Ulster Under-21 Football Championship (1): 1981 (c)

Club

- Monaghan Senior Football Championship (8): 1976, 1982, 1986, 1988, 1990, 1991, 1995, 1996
- Ulster Senior Club Football Championship (2): 1986, 1991
- Monaghan Senior Football League Division 1 (3): 1994, 1995, 1996

== Coaching honours ==
Manager of Louth

- All-Ireland Senior B Football Championship (1): 1998
- Tommy Murphy Cup (1): 2006
- National Football League Division 2 (1): 2006
- O'Byrne Cup (1): 2009
- Leinster Junior Football Championship: (1) 2009

Geraldines GFC

- Leinster Intermediate Club Football Championship (1): 2013

U21 Ulster championship (1): 1999

Sporting positions
Preceded by Val Andrews	Louth Senior Football Manager; 2006–2009	Succeeded by Peter Fitzpatrick
Preceded by Séamus McEnaney	Monaghan Senior Football Manager; 2010–2012	Succeeded by Malachy O'Rourke
