= Michael Prout (Gaelic footballer) =

Irish Gaelic footballer and hurler

Personal information
- Native name: Mícheál Prút (Irish)
- Born: 1983 Shanbally, County Cork, Ireland
- Occupation: Primary school principal

Sport
- Sport: Gaelic football
- Position: Right corner-back
Clubs
- Years: Club
- Shamrocks → Carrigdhoun
Club titles
- Cork titles: 0
College
- Years: College
- Cork Institute of Technology
College titles
- Sigerson titles: 0
- Fitzgibbon titles: 0
Inter-county
Years	County	Apps (scores)
2006-2008	Cork	5 (0-00)
Inter-county titles
- Munster titles: 1
- All-Irelands: 0
- NFL: 0
- All Stars: 0

Michael Prout (born 1983) is an Irish retired Gaelic footballer. At club level, he played with Shamrocks and at inter-county level with the Cork senior football team.

== Playing career ==
Prout played Gaelic football and hurling as a student at Rochestown College. He later studied at the Cork Institute of Technology and lined out as a dual player with the senior teams in the Fitzgibbon Cup and Sigerson Cup competitions.

At club level, Prout began his career at juvenile and underage levels with Shamrocks. After progressing to adult level, he won a South East JAHC medal in 2005 after a defeat of Kinsale in the divisional final. Prout added a South East JAFC medal to his collection in 2016, however, Shamrocks were later beaten by Gabriel Rangers in the subsequent 2016 Cork JAFC final. He also earned selection to the Carrigdhoun divisional team.

At inter-county level, Prout first played for Cork as a dual player at minor level. He won an All-Ireland MHC medal in 2001, after lining out at left wing-back in the 2-10 to 1-08 defeat of Galway in the 2001 All-Ireland minor final. Prout later progressed to the under-21 team and won a Munster U21FC medal after a one-point win over Kerry in 2004.

Prout won an All-Ireland IHC medal with Cork in 2003, after a one-point win over Kilkenny in the final. He added an All-Ireland JFC medal to his collection two years later, when Cork had a 0-10 to 1-04 win over Meath in the 2005 All-Ireland junior final. Prout was added to the senior team shortly afterwards and won a Munster SFC medal in 2006. He ended his inter-county career by winning a second All-Ireland JFC medal in 2009.

== Coaching career ==
Prout served as a selector under Tomás Ó Sé during his tenure as manager of the Glanmire intermediate football team.

== Honours ==
Shamrocks

- South East Junior A Football Championship: 2016
- South East Junior A Hurling Championship: 2005

Cork

- Munster Senior Football Championship: 2006
- All-Ireland Intermediate Hurling Championship: 2003
- Munster Intermediate Hurling Championship: 2003
- All-Ireland Junior Football Championship: 2005 (c), 2009
- Munster Junior Football Championship: 2005 (c), 2009
- Munster Under-21 Football Championship: 2004
- All-Ireland Minor Hurling Championship: 2001
