= Michael Fanning (Gaelic footballer) =

Irish Gaelic footballer for Louth

Mick Fanning
Personal information
- Native name: Micheál Ó Fionnáin (Irish)
- Nickname: Mick
- Born: County Louth

Sport
- Sport: Gaelic football
- Position: Centre-back
Club
- Years: Club
- Naomh Máirtín
Inter-county
- Years: County
- 2006-2012: Louth

Michael "Mick" Fanning (born 1986) is an Irish Gaelic footballer who played for the Louth county team. He is a long-serving member of his local club team Naomh Máirtín.

He played in defence for the Louth senior team and lined out at centre-half back in the controversial 2010 Leinster Senior Football Championship Final against Meath. In 2011 Fanning emigrated to Australia in search of work with his county teammates John O'Brien and Brian White, missing out on a National League Division 3 winners' medal as a consequence.

He returned to inter-county action in 2012. In 2020 he captained Naomh Máirtín to a first Louth Senior Football Championship against opponents St Mary's.

== Honours ==
County

- Tommy Murphy Cup (1): 2006
- O'Byrne Cup (1): 2009
- Owen Treacy Cup (1): 2006

Club

- Louth Senior Football Championship (2): 2020, 2021
- Cardinal O'Donnell Cup (2): 2017, 2019
- Louth Senior Football League Division 1B (1): 2006
- Paddy Sheelan Shield (1): 2012
- Louth Junior 2 Football League Division 4B (1): 2004
- Louth Minor B Football Championship (1): 2003
