= Val Andrews =

Gaelic football manager

Personal information
- Place of birth: Dublin, Ireland

Managerial career
- Years: Team
- IT Tralee: ?-1998
- Cavan: 1998-2001
- Louth: 2004-2005
- Leinster: 2005-2006
- Dublin Junior Football: 2007-present
- Dublin Minor Football Team: 2010

Val Andrews was the manager for the Dublin Minor Football Team for the 2010 championship. Andrews is employed as a lecturer the Institute of Technology Blanchardstown (ITB). Andrews had previously managed Louth and Cavan and the Dublin Junior Football team in 2007. Andrews had previously been linked to managing the Dublin senior football team in 2001, Tommy Lyons was chosen in the end. Andrews managed IT Tralee to Sigerson Cup success in 1998, the same year he began as the new Cavan manager. Andrews managed Leinster in 2005 and 2006 and won the Railway Cup on both occasions. He had launched a campaign to become the Dublin GAA County Chairman and released a website to promote the changes he would make as a chairman for the county board. He failed in his attempts to take the position from Gerry Harrington due to a vote of 171 to 99 in the Corkman's favour.

== Dublin Junior manager ==
In his first game as Dublin Junior manager, Dublin defeated Louth by 3–21 to 0–2. This result qualified Dublin for the Junior semi final against Wicklow. Dublin defeated Wicklow to qualify for the final after a 2–36 to 1–07 victory over their Leinster neighbours. This progress ended when Dublin met Wexford in the final and were subsequently defeated by 1–10 to 1-08.

== Leinster manager ==
Andrews led Leinster to consecutive Railway Cup titles in 2005 and 2006.

Preceded by Liam Austin	Cavan Senior Football Manager; 1998–2001	Succeeded by Mattie Kerrigan
Preceded by Paddy Carr	Louth Senior Football Manager; 2004–2005	Succeeded by Eamonn McEneaney
Preceded by ?	Dublin Junior Football Manager; 2007–present	Succeeded by Incumbent
