= Darren Clarke (Gaelic footballer) =

Irish sportsperson

Personal information
- Born: Ardee, County Louth
- Occupation: AIB employee

Sport
- Sport: Gaelic football
- Position: corner-forward
Clubs
- Years: Club
- St Mary's; St Sylvester's (Dublin)
Club titles
- Leinster titles: 0
- All-Ireland Titles: 0
Inter-county
- Years: County
- 2004-2014: Louth

Darren Clarke (born 1983) is a retired Irish gaelic footballer from County Louth. He played with his local club St Mary's from juvenile level until 2008, when he joined Dublin side St Sylvester's. He returned to the Ardee club in 2013. He was a member of the Louth senior squad from 2004 until 2014.

Clarke won Railway Cup honours with Leinster in 2006. He retired from club football at the end of the 2023 season.

== Honours ==
County

- National Football League Division 2 (1): 2006
- National Football League Division 3 (1): 2011
- Tommy Murphy Cup (1): 2006
- O'Byrne Cup (1): 2009
- Owen Treacy Cup (1): 2006

Club

- Louth Senior Football Championship (2): 2022, 2023
- Cardinal O'Donnell Cup (2): 2002, 2021,
- Paddy Sheelan Cup (3): 2016, 2018, 2021
- Louth Senior Football League Division 1B (1): 2004
- Dublin Senior Football League (1): 2010
- Dublin Senior B Football Championship (1): 2008
- St Vincent de Paul Cup (2): 2008, 2009

Province

- Railway Cup (1): 2006
