= John O'Brien (Louth footballer) =

Irish Gaelic footballer

Personal information
- Native name: Sean Ó Briain (Irish)
- Born: 12 October 1985 (age 41) Dundalk, County Louth

Sport
- Sport: Gaelic football
- Position: Left half-back
Club
- Years: Club
- 2002-: Seán O'Mahony's
Inter-county
- Years: County
- 2006-2014: Louth
Inter-county titles
- Leinster titles: 0
- All-Irelands: 0

John O'Brien is a former Louth inter-county gaelic footballer. At club level he represents Dundalk team Seán O'Mahony's.

== Inter-county ==
Having previously played for his county at minor and under-21 levels, O'Brien made his senior debut in 2006 in an O'Byrne Cup match against D.I.T. He would go on to become a mainstay of the Wee County panel for almost ten years. He was part of the team which almost won the county's first Leinster title in 53 years but were controversially denied by neighbours Meath, after referee Martin Sludden awarded a goal which was proven to be a square ball and thrown over the line.

In early 2011 O'Brien announced his plans to emigrate to Australia in search for work alongside his teammates Michael Fanning and midfielder Brian White. He returned home in early 2013 and rejoined the county senior squad under new manager Aidan O'Rourke. He retired from inter-county activity following the conclusion of the 2014 All-Ireland Senior Football Championship.

O'Brien won O'Byrne Cup, Tommy Murphy Cup and NFL Division 2 medals during his career with Louth.

== Club honours ==
- Louth Senior Football Championship: 2016
- Louth Intermediate Football Championship: 2014
- Leinster Intermediate Club Football Championship: 2014
- Louth Intermediate Football League: 2005
- Intermediate Football League Division 2B: 2002, 2004
- Paddy Sheelan Shield: 2013
- Andy Rogers Cup: 2000
