= Mark Brennan (Gaelic footballer) =

Louth Gaelic footballer

Personal information
- Born: 1983 or 1984 (age 42–43)

Sport
- Sport: Gaelic football
Clubs
- Years: Club
- Mattock Rangers; Hunterstown Rovers
Club titles
- Louth titles: 4
Inter-county
- Years: County
- Louth

Mark Brennan is an Irish Gaelic footballer who plays as a forward for Mattock Rangers, Hunterstown Rovers and the Louth county team.

Brennan linked up with Louth's senior inter-county panel in late 2005. He scored a "Zola-like" goal to help Louth defeat Cavan in the 2006 National League. He scored a goal against Roscommon and two more against Antrim in the 2010 National League but Louth lost both matches. He was Louth's centre-forward for the 2010 Leinster Senior Football Championship final. He captained Louth in 2012, standing in for Paddy Kenan. His nephew Ryan Burns has also played for Louth.

Brennan won four Louth Senior Football Championship titles with Mattock Rangers in the 2000s before he declared for his father's club Hunterstown Rovers in 2018.
