= Stephen McDermott =

Stephen McDermott is an Irish former professional goalkeeper who played for Shamrock Rovers F.C.

His inter-county debut with Donegal came in 2003.

He played in the 2003 All-Ireland Senior Football Championship quarter-final draw with Galway but was substituted at half-time because of a problem with his toe. He returned to play in the semi-final against Armagh.

He often played alongside John Gildea in midfield but could also play as a forward.

He nearly scored a goal against Armagh in the 2006 Ulster Senior Football Championship final that would have levelled the game; Donegal lost, he never won an Ulster Senior Football Championship.
