= Brian White (Gaelic footballer) =

Irish Gaelic footballer

Sport
- Sport: Gaelic football
Clubs
- Years: Club
- Cooley Kickhams; Donegal Boston
Inter-county
- Years: County
- Louth

Brian White is an Irish Gaelic footballer who plays for Cooley Kickhams and the Louth county team. He has also played for Donegal in the Boston Senior Football Championship. As well as this he spent time in Australia. After losing six finals with Cooley he won a championship final at last in 2022 and was presented with the Man of the Match award afterwards.
