= David Reid (Gaelic footballer) =

Personal information
- Born: 1983/1984

Sport
- Sport: Gaelic football
Club
- Years: Club
- Mattock Rangers
Inter-county
- Years: County
- Louth

David Reid is an Irish Gaelic footballer who plays for Mattock Rangers and the Louth county team. He has also managed the Louth minor team.

Reid is married with children. His father Damien Reid, uncle Seán Reid and cousin Alan Kirk all played for the Louth senior team, and Reid played with his younger brother Adrian for Louth in a 2009 All-Ireland Senior Football Championship match against Tipperary.
