= Barry Dunnion =

Irish sportsperson

Personal information
- Born: County Donegal, Ireland
- Occupation: Fitness instructor
- Height: 5 ft 10 in (178 cm)

Sport
- Sport: Gaelic football
Club
- Years: Club
- ?–: Four Masters
Club titles
- Donegal titles: 1
Inter-county
- Years: County
- 2004–2013: Donegal
Inter-county titles
- Ulster titles: 1
- All-Irelands: 1
- NFL: 1

Barry Dunnion is an Irish Gaelic footballer who plays for Four Masters and also, formerly, for the Donegal county team.

He plays at wing-back.

== Early life ==
Dunnion is the son of Danny and Marian Dunnion and came from a family of three, including his brother Donal and sister Donna. His sister Donna Boyle (wife of Brendan Boyle) also played for Four Masters but died following an illness at the age of 41 in February 2022. Dunnion is a brother-in-law of Karl Lacey.

== Club ==
Dunnion won the Donegal Senior Football Championship with his club in 2003.

== Inter-county ==
Dunnion was first called up to the senior team by Brian McEniff for winter training in 2003. He played in the 2006 Ulster Senior Football Championship Final at Croke Park and scored one point.

Nominated for an All Star award in 2006, he later became hampered by injury which caused him to miss Donegal's 2011 Ulster Senior Football Championship success. A member of the Donegal team that won the National Football League in 2007, playing from the start to the end in the final against Mayo, His injury nightmare began during the 2007 Ulster Senior Football Championship. Having played all the way through the league, including the final won by Donegal, as well as the Ulster Senior Football Championship quarter-final against Armagh, he tore his groin kicking a ball while running out at Clones for the semi-final against Tyrone. In the following years he underwent four major operations, three on the groin and one on the posterior cruciate he ruptured while playing for his club.

He last played competitively for Donegal in the opening 2011 National Football League game against Sligo.

== Honours ==
Donegal

- Ulster Senior Football Championship runner-up: 2004? 2006
- National Football League Division 1: 2007

Club

- Donegal Senior Football Championship: 2003

Individual

- All Star: 0
  - Nominated in 2006
