= Adrian Reid (Gaelic footballer) =

Louth Gaelic footballer

Personal information
- Born: 1986/1987

Sport
- Sport: Gaelic football
Club
- Years: Club
- Mattock Rangers
Club titles
- Louth titles: 3
Inter-county
Years	County	Apps (scores)
	Louth	106

Adrian Reid is an Irish Gaelic footballer who plays for Mattock Rangers and the Louth county team.

Reid first played senior inter-county football in the 2008 O'Byrne Cup. His championship debut was against Dublin in the 2008 Leinster Senior Football Championship. He played in the 2010 Leinster Senior Football Championship final, scoring a point into the Hill 16 end of Croke Park. He was also Louth captain, with Colin Kelly giving him the chance when he was Louth manager in the mid-2010s. He captained Louth to the 2016 National League Division 4 title.

Reid announced his retirement in 2017, having played senior inter-county football 106 times, 87 from the start, his last match having been earlier that year against Longford in a qualifier. He had been struggling with wrist and Achilles injuries. His retirement left Andy McDonnell as the last man left from the 2010 campaign.

Reid won three Louth Senior Football Championship titles with Mattock Rangers, the last one in 2010.

Reid is married with children. His father Damien Reid, uncle Seán Reid and cousin Alan Kirk all played for the Louth senior team, and Reid played with his elder brother David for Louth in a 2009 All-Ireland Senior Football Championship match against Tipperary.
