= Leinster Junior Football Championship =

Gaelic football competition in Ireland

- Founded: 1905
- Title holders: Meath (18th title)
- Most titles: Dublin (20 titles)

The Leinster Junior Football Championship was a junior "knockout" competition in the game of Gaelic football played in the province of Leinster in Ireland. The series of games were organised by the Leinster Council. The competition ran from 1905 to 2019. The most successful county was Dublin who have won on twenty occasions.

The winners of the Leinster Junior Football Championship each year would then progress to play the other provincial champions for a chance to win the All-Ireland Junior Football Championship.

At GAA Congress in 2021, a motion was passed to change the entire structure of the All Ireland Junior Football Championship competition to that of a mostly 'overseas competition' along with just one Irish county, Kilkenny. The All-Ireland Junior Football Championship competition now involves just four teams: New York, Kilkenny, and the winner and runner-up of the British Junior Championship, all meeting in the All Ireland Junior Championship semi-finals. Hence there is no longer any Leinster Junior Football Championship competition.

== Top winners ==
	Team	Wins	Years won
1	Dublin	20	1908, 1914, 1916, 1922, 1926, 1930, 1939, 1948, 1950, 1951, 1954, 1955, 1959, 1960, 1971, 1983, 1985, 1987, 1994, 2008
2	Meath	18	1947, 1952, 1958, 1962, 1964, 1986, 1988, 1990, 1991, 1995, 1996, 1997, 1999, 2003, 2005, 2006, 2017, 2019
3	Louth	12	1910, 1912, 1925, 1928, 1932, 1934, 1946, 1957, 1961, 1966, 2009, 2010
3	Kildare	12	1927, 1931, 1938, 1956, 1965, 1967, 1970, 1989, 2004, 2011, 2013, 2018
4	Wexford	8	1911, 1963, 1984, 1992, 2000, 2007, 2015, 2016
5	Wicklow	6	1906, 1909, 1936, 1949, 1969, 2002
6	Laois	5	1907, 1941, 1968, 1973, 1993
7	Offaly	4	1935, 1972, 1998, 2001
7	Westmeath	4	1905, 1915, 1929, 1940
8	Carlow	3	1913, 1923, 1933
8	Longford	3	1924, 1937, 1953
9	Cavan	2	2012, 2014

== Roll of honour ==
Year	Winners	Score	Runners-up	Score
2022-	Kilkenny represent the province since 2022			
2020-21	No Championship (Covid-19)			
2019	Meath	2-14	Kildare	0-18
2018	Kildare	2-17	Meath	2-15
2017	Meath	0–19	Louth	0–10
2016	Wexford	2–12	Louth	0–09
2015	Wexford	1–10	Meath	0–12
2014	Cavan	1–11	Longford	1–07
2013	Kildare	2–15	Longford	3–08
2012	Cavan	1–13	Kildare	0–09
2011	Kildare	5–08	Cavan	1–09
2010	Louth	0–13	Cavan	2–06
2009	Louth	0–11, 1–12 (R)	Longford	0–11, 0–10 (R)
2008	Dublin	1–13	Meath	1–09
2007	Wexford	1–10	Dublin	1–08
2006	Meath	1–12	Louth	0–11
2005	Meath	1–09	Louth	0–05
2004	Kildare	0–09	Dublin	0–08
2003	Meath	1–15	Wexford	0–07
2002	Wicklow	3–06	Kildare	0–09
2001	Offaly	2–09	Meath	1–11
2000	Wexford	1–09	Dublin	1–05
1999	Meath	1–9	Dublin	1–06
1998	Offaly	1–18	Kildare	0–08
1997	Meath	0–16	Louth	1–08
1996	Meath	1–13	Laois	2–07
1995	Meath	2–11	Offaly	1–05
1994	Dublin	0–09	Louth	0–05
1993	Laois	2–08	Carlow	0–11
1992	Wexford	1–16	Meath	2–10
1991	Meath	1–10, 1–14 (R)	Dublin	1–10, 2–02 (R)
1990	Meath	0–15	Dublin	0–11
1989	Kildare	1–07	Louth	1–06
1988	Meath	0–10	Dublin	1–04
1987	Dublin	1–08	Meath	0–04
1986	Meath	1–10	Kildare	1–05
1985	Dublin	3–16	Louth	2–04
1984	Wexford	0–08	Louth	0–06
1983	Dublin	2–08	Meath	0–05
1974-82	No Championship			
1973	Laois	1–09	Meath	0–09
1972	Offaly	3–08	Wexford	1–03
1971	Dublin	2–09	Kilkenny	0–05
1970	Kildare	3–13	Dublin	1–11
1969	Wicklow	2–05	Meath	0–05
1968	Laois	2–07, 0–09 (R)	Westmeath	3–04, 0–04 (R)
1967	Kildare	2–08	Offaly	1–07
1966	Louth	3–14	Kildare	3–12
1965	Kildare	2–08	Laois	0–08
1964	Meath	3–10	Kildare	0–13
1963	Wexford	0–14	Westmeath	1–06
1962	Meath	2–11	Wexford	1–04
1961	Louth	2–04	Dublin	0–08
1960	Dublin	2–09	Meath	0–05
1959	Dublin	2–16	Longford	0–05
1958	Meath	1–05	Dublin	1–03
1957	Louth	2–06	Kilkenny	1–05
1956	Kildare	2–08	Wexford	2–03
1955	Dublin	1–12, 1–08 (R)	Meath	4–03, 0–05 (R)
1954	Dublin	0–10, 2–11 (R)	Louth	0–10, 2–04 (R)
1953	Longford	3–05	Kilkenny	1–05
1952	Meath	2–06	Wicklow	0–01
1951	Dublin	5–07	Carlow	0–07
1950	Dublin	1–15	Wexford	2–08
1949	Wicklow	5–02	Meath	2–10
1948	Dublin	2–09, 6–03 (R)	Wexford	4–03, 2–04 (R)
1947	Meath	2–03	Dublin	1–04
1946	Louth	3–05	Wexford	0–01
1942-45	No Championship			
1941	Laois	2–07	Louth	2–05
1940	Westmeath	5–07	Kildare	0–05
1939	Dublin	2–04, 2–12 (R)	Meath	1–07, 0–07 (R)
1938	Kildare	1–03	Westmeath	0–05
1937	Longford	3–04	Offaly	4–01
1936	Wicklow	5–05	Kildare	0–03
1935	Offaly	1–06, 2–03 (R)	Dublin	1–06, 0–02 (R)
1934	Louth	2–04, 1–07 (R)	Kildare	1–07, 0–05 (R)
1933	Carlow	5–03	Wicklow	4–05
1932	Louth	2–07	Carlow	1–05
1931	Kildare	1–06	Dublin	1–04
1930	Dublin	3–03	Carlow	0–02
1929	Westmeath	1–02	Laois	0–02
1928	Louth	1–05	Dublin	1–04
1927	Kildare	3–03	Offaly	2–03
1926	Dublin	0–04	Kildare	0–03
1925	Louth	1–03	Dublin	0–04
1924	Longford*	0–02	Meath	1–03
1923	Carlow	2–05	Dublin	1–01
1922	Dublin	0–03, 2–02 (R)	Wicklow	0–03, 0–03 (R)
1917-21	No Championship			
1916	Dublin	2–07	Wexford	0–02
1915	Westmeath	3–00	Wexford	0–02
1914	Dublin	2–02	Kilkenny	0–03
1913	Carlow	3–04	Meath	0–00
1912	Louth	3–01	Carlow	2–02
1911	Wexford	3–01	Dublin	0–02
1910	Louth	1–05	Laois	1–01
1909	Wicklow	1–10	Westmeath	0–03
1908	Dublin	1–08	Meath	0–03
1907	Laois	2–11	Westmeath	0–05
1906	Wicklow	1–11	Westmeath	0–00
1905	Westmeath	1–04	Carlow	1–03

(* 1924 Longford awarded the title following an objection to Meath playing a Senior player.)

== See also ==
- Munster Junior Football Championship
- Connacht Junior Football Championship
- Ulster Junior Football Championship

== Sources ==
- Leinster Junior Football Roll of Honour
- Final Results 1905–1999
- Roll of Honour on gaainfo.com
