= 2026 Westmeath county football team season =

Westmeath county football team
2026 season
- Manager: Mark McHugh
- Stadium: Cusack Park, Mullingar
- NFL D3: 3rd
- Leinster SFC: Winners
- O'Byrne Cup: Winners

The following is a summary of Westmeath county football team's 2026 season.

== Personnel changes ==
Mark McHugh was appointed as manager. Jamie Gonoud came in as a selector.

Kieran Martin announced his retirement from inter-county football on the morning of Friday, 21 November 2025.

John Heslin returned from inter-county retirement this season following an injury to Luke Loughlin. Heslin had been working as an analyst with GAA+.

== Competitions ==
=== O'Byrne Cup ===
Westmeath won for the first time since 2019.

3 January 2026
13:30 IWT (UTC±0)
Match 5

Longford	scr. – w/o	Westmeath

Glennon Bros Pearse Park, Longford

Match 5 not played due to frozen pitch. Match was decided via coin toss.

7 January 2026
19:30 IWT (UTC±0)
Quarter-final 2

Report

Westmeath	2-15 (21) – (15) 0-15	Louth
(HT: 2-5 - 0-9)
Pts: Luke Loughlin 0-5 (1tpf), Brandon Kelly 1-1, Brian Guerin 1-0, Robbie Forde 0-3 (2f), Kevin O'Sullivan 0-2, Tom Molloy 0-2, Tadhg Baker 0-1, Kealan Connell 0-1		Pts: Ryan Burns 0-8 (2tpf, 2f, 1'45), Dylan McKeown 0-4 (1tpf, 1f), Conall McCaul 0-2, Eoghan Callaghan 0-1

St Loman's Park, Mullingar
Referee: Lar Murphy

10 January 2026
14:00 IWT (UTC±0)
Semi-final 2

Report

Offaly	2-08 (14) – (27) 5-12	Westmeath
(HT: 1-3 — 2-7)
Pts: Ciaran Murphy 2-0, Darragh Flynn 0-2 (2f), Jack Bryant 0-2 (1f), Diarmuid Egan 0-1, Cormac Egan 0-1, Eoin Sawyer 0-1, Harry Plunkett 0-1 (f)		Pts: Brandon Kelly 2-1, Danny McCartan 2-0, Senan Baker 1-0, Ronan Wallace 0-3, Luke Loughlin 0-3 (2f), Matthew Whittaker 0-1, Brían Cooney 0-1, Robbie Forde 0-1

TEG Cusack Park, Mullingar

TG4

16 January 2026
19:30 IWT (UTC±0)
Final

Report

Kildare	1-16 (19) – (21) 1-18	Westmeath
(HT: 0-08 – 0-04)
Gls: Liam Kelly 1 Pts: Alex Beirne 5 (1x2p, 1 '45', 1f), Brian McLoughlin 4 (1x2p), Ben Loakman 3 (1x2p), Kevin Feely 2(2p), Eoin Cully 1, Calum Bolton 1		Gls: Ronan Wallace 1 Pts: Luke Loughlin 8 (3x2p, 1 '45'), Ronan Wallace 7 (3x2p), Danny McCartan 2, Senan Baker 1f

St Conleth's Park, Newbridge
Referee: Kevin Williamson

=== National Football League ===
Westmeath played in Division 3, ending the season in third position after achieving four wins and sustaining three losses. In March 2026, just before the last two league games, manager Mark McHugh took his panel on a training camp in Kilcar and Killybegs.

==== Fixtures ====
25 January 2026 Round 1	Westmeath	2-14 (20) – (19) 1-16	Sligo	Mullingar
14:00 GMT (UTC+0)		(HT: 2-9 - 0-7)		Venue: Cusack Park
	Pts: Jonathan Lynam 2-0, Luke Loughlin 0-5 (1tpf, 1f), Danny McCartan 0-3 (1tp), Sam McCartan 0-3, Senan Baker 0-1 (f), Matthew Whittaker 0-1, Shane Corcoran 0-1	Report	Pts: Alan McLoughlin 0-4 (1tpf, 2f), Pat Spillane 0-4 (2tp), Cian Lally 1-0, Luke Towey 0-2, Niall Murphy 0-2 (2f), Nathan Mullen 0-1, Darragh Cummins 0-1, Lee Deignan 0-1, Shane Deignan 0-1	Referee: Kevin Faloon (Armagh)

1 February 2026 Round 2	Clare	1-17 (20) – (25) 2-19	Westmeath	Ennis
14:00 GMT (UTC+0)		(HT: 0-5 - 1-10)		Venue: Páirc Chíosóg
	Pts: Aaron Griffin 0-7 (2tp, 1f), Eoin Cleary 0-3 (1tp), Mark McInerney 0-3 (1tp, 1f), Alan Sweeney 1-0, Brian McNamara 0-2, Cormac Murray 0-1, Jamie Stack 0-1	Report	Pts: Sam McCartan 0-5 (2tp), Ronan Wallace 1-2, Luke Loughlin 0-3 (1f), Brían Cooney 1-0, Kevin O'Sullivan 0-2, Matthew Whittaker 0-2, Ray Connellan 0-2, TJ Cox 0-2, Robert Forde 0-1	Referee: David Murnane (Cork)

14 February 2026 Round 3	Down	2-15 (21) – (18) 1-15	Westmeath	Newry
18:00 GMT (UTC+0)		(HT: 1-10 - 0-5)		Venue: Páirc Esler
	Pts: Ceilum Doherty 0-4, John McGeough 1-1, Ryan Magill 1-0, Daniel Guinness 0-3, Adam Crimmins 0-3, Odhran Murdock 0-3, Pearse McPolin 0-1	Report	Pts: Luke Loughlin 0-6 (2tpf, 1f), Brían Cooney 1-1, Robert Forde 0-3, Ray Connellan 0-2, Ronan Wallace 0-1, Senan Baker 0-1, Sam McCartan 0-1	Referee: Noel Mooney (Cavan)

22 February 2026 Round 4	Westmeath	1-26 (29) – (17) 2-11	Fermanagh	Mullingar
14:00 GMT (UTC+0)		(HT: 0-8 - 2-9)		Venue: Cusack Park
	Pts: Luke Loughlin 1-4 (1tpf, 1f), Brían Cooney 0-7 (1tp), Ronan Wallace 0-3 (1tp), Matthew Whittaker 0-3, Sam McCartan 0-3 (1tp), Charlie Drumm 0-1, Ray Connellan 0-1, Kevin O'Sullivan 0-1, Shane Corcoran 0-1, Robert Forde 0-1, Brandon Kelly 0-1	Report	Pts: Garvan Jones 0-8 (2tp, 1tpf), Aogan Kelm 1-1, Paul Breen 1-0, Conor O'Hanlon 0-1, Ciaran Corrigan 0-1	Referee: Thomas Murphy (Galway)

28 February 2026 Round 5	Laois	3-16 (25) – (16) 1-13	Westmeath	Portlaoise
18:00 GMT (UTC+0)		(HT: 1-9 - 0-9)		Venue: O'Moore Park
	Pts: Evan O'Carroll 1-3 (2f), Paul Kingston 1-2 (1pen, 1f), Ronan Coffey 1-1, Killian Roche 0-3 (1tp), Daragh Galvin 0-3, Darren Brennan 0-1, Kevin Swayne 0-1, Rioghan Murphy 0-1, Padraig Kirwan 0-1	Report	Pts: Luke Loughlin 1-6 (1pen, 2f), Kevin O'Sullivan 0-3, Sam McCartan 0-2 (1f), Shane Allen 0-1, Shane Corcoran 0-1	Referee: Chris Maguire (Cork)

15 March 2026 Round 6	Westmeath	4-21 (33) – (17) 3-8	Limerick	Mullingar
14:00 GMT (UTC+0)		(HT: 2-6 - 2-5)		Venue: Cusack Park
	Pts: Ronan Wallace 1-4 (2tp), Luke Loughlin 1-3 (1f), Matthew Whittaker 1-1, Robert Forde 1-1, Brían Cooney 0-4 (1tp), Sam McCartan 0-2 (1f), Brandon Kelly 0-2, Tom Molloy 0-1, Kevin O'Sullivan 0-1, Boidu Sayeh 0-1, TJ Cox 0-1	Report	Pts: James Naughton 1-1, Peter Nash 1-0, Shane Cross 1-0, Tony McCarthy 0-2 (tp), Mark McCarthy 0-2 (tp), Jack McCarthy 0-1, Paul Maher 0-1, Rory O'Brien 0-1	Referee: Diarmuid Boylan (Monaghan)

22 March 2026 Round 7	Wexford	2-16 (22) – (21) 1-18	Westmeath	Wexford
14:00 GMT (UTC+0)		(HT: 0-5 - 0-10)		Venue: Chadwicks Wexford Park
	Pts: Sean Ryan 2-0, Sean Nolan 0-5 (1f), Darragh Brooks 0-4 (2tpf), Jack Higgins 0-2, Niall Hughes 0-2, Mark Rossiter 0-1 (f), Páraic Hughes 0-1, Eoin Porter 0-1	Report	Pts: Sam McCartan 0-5 (1tp), Matthew Whittaker 0-5, Jonathan Lynam 1-0, Ronan Wallace 0-2, Luke Loughlin 0-2, Tom Molloy 0-1, Brían Cooney 0-1, Shane Allen 0-1, Robert Forde 0-1	Referee: Sean Lonergan (Tipperary)

==== Table ====
Pos	Team	Pld	W	D	L	PF	PA	PD	Pts	Qualification
1	Down	7	6	0	1	172	144	+28	12	Advance to NFL Division 3 Final and promotion to 2027 NFL Division 2
2	Wexford	7	5	0	2	142	125	+17	10	Advance to NFL Division 3 Final and promotion to 2027 NFL Division 2
3	Westmeath	7	4	0	3	162	141	+21	8	
4	Laois	7	3	1	3	131	130	+1	7	
5	Sligo (Note: Sligo are ranked ahead of Clare as they won the head-to-head game between the two teams.)	7	3	0	4	133	146	−13	6	
6	Clare	7	3	0	4	163	159	+4	6	
7	Limerick	7	2	1	4	119	146	−27	5	Relegation to 2027 NFL Division 4
8	Fermanagh	7	1	0	6	119	150	−31	2	Relegation to 2027 NFL Division 4

Source: GAA.ie
Rules for classification: Tiebreakers

=== Leinster Senior Football Championship ===
Westmeath won for the first time since 2004.

Brían Cooney attempted a two-pointer in the 2026 Leinster Senior Football Championship final, only for the ball to sail over Dublin goalkeeper Evan Comerford and into the net for a goal and three points. His was the first goal that Westmeath had scored in a Leinster Senior Final for 95 years. This was only a second Leinster Final defeat of the century for Dublin and a second Leinster Championship loss of any type since 2010.

Also in that game, John Heslin scored a two-pointer and a free on his return from inter-county retirement. He surpassed the expectations of manager Mark McHugh, who did not expect Heslin to be ready to play until the Leinster Championship was finished.

==== Fixtures ====
12 April 2026 Preliminary round	Westmeath	5-25 (40) – (19) 1-16	Longford	Longford
15:00		(HT: 5-9 - 1-8)		Venue: Pearse Park
	Gls: Luke Loughlin 2, Brandon Kelly 2, Shane Corcoran 1 Pts: Luke Loughlin 2-2, Brandon Kelly 2-2, Shane Corcoran 1-4, Ray Connellan 0-5 (2tp), Matthew Whittaker, Conor Dillon 0-3 each, Tom Molloy, Sam McCartan (1tpf) 0-2 each, Ronan Wallace, Kevin O'Sullivan 0-1 each	Report	Gls: James Moran 1 Pts: Dylan Farrell 0-10 (4tpf, 1f), Dessie Reynolds 0-4 (2tp), James Moran 1-0, Daniel Reynolds, Paddy Moran 0-1 each	Referee: Kieran Eannetta (Tyrone); Attendance: 1,500

19 April 2026 Quarter-final	Meath	0-25 (25) – (30) 4-18	Westmeath	Tullamore
14:00		(HT: 0-9 – 2-9)		Venue: O'Connor Park
	Pts: Ruari Kinsella 0-6 (2tp), Eoghan Frayne 0-4 (1tp), James Conlon 0-4, Jack Flynn 0-4 (1tp), Jordan Morris 0-3 (2f), Jack O'Connor 0-2, Aaron Lynch 0-2, Bryan Menton 0-1	Report	Pts: Luke Loughlin 0-6 (1tp), Shane Corcoran 1-2, Sam McCartan 0-4 (3f), Matthew Whittaker 1-0, Robbie Forde 1-0, Danny McCartan 1-0, Ray Connellan 0-2, Brandon Kelly 0-2, Brían Cooney 0-1, Kevin O'Sullivan 0-1	Referee: Barry Cassidy (Derry); Attendance: 9,184

3 May 2026 Semi-final	Westmeath	2-21 (27) – (23) 0-23 (a.e.t.)	Kildare	Tullamore
19:00		(HT: 1-8 – 0-10) (FT: 1-16 – 0-19)		Venue: O'Connor Park
	Pts: Brandon Kelly 1-4, Sam McCartan 0-5 (2tpf), Brían Cooney 1-0, Ray Connellan 0-2 (1f), Senan Baker 0-2, Shane Corcoran 0-1, Kevin O'Sullivan 0-1, Tadhg Baker 0-1, Shane Allen 0-1, Ronan Wallace 0-1, Charlie Drumm 0-1, Robbie Forde 0-1, Eoghan McCabe 0-1	Report	Pts: Eoin Cully 0-4, Darragh Kirwan 0-4, Ben Loakman 0-3, Alex Beirne 0-3 (1tpf), Darragh Swords 0-2 (1tp), Jack Robinson 0-2, Tommy Gill 0-1, Kevin Feely 0-1, Callum Bolton 0-1, Brian McLoughlin 0-1 (1f), Colm Moran 0-1	Referee: Martin McNally (Monaghan); Attendance: 12,086; TV: GAA+

17 May 2026 Final	Dublin	0-26 (26) – (34) 2-28 (a.e.t.)	Westmeath	Dublin
14:00		(HT: 0-11 – 0-09) (FT: 0-22 – 0-22)		Venue: Croke Park
	Pts: Cormac Costello 0-8 (4f, 1 tpf), Ciarán Kilkenny 0-3, Niall Scully 0-2, Paddy Small 0-2, David Byrne 0-2, Seán Bugler 0-2, Seán Guiden 0-2 (tp), Greg McEneaney 0-2, Eoin Kennedy 0-1, Luke Breathnach 0-1, Brian Howard 0-1	Report	Pts: Jack Duncan 1-1, Brandon Kelly 0-4, Matthew Whittaker 0-4 (1 tp), Senan Baker 0-4, Brían Cooney 1-0, Ronan Wallace 0-3, John Heslin 0-3 (1 tp, 1f), Kevin O'Sullivan 0-2, Shane Allen 0-2 (tp), Sam McCartan 0-2, Shane Corcoran 0-1, Conor Dillon 0-1, Robbie Forde 0-1	Referee: David Coldrick (Meath); TV: RTÉ2

==== Bracket ====
Preliminary round
12 April, Carlow
Carlow	1-7
Wicklow	2-15
11 April, Tullamore
Offaly	0-12
Laois	3-12
12 April, Longford
Longford	1-16
Westmeath	5-25

Quarter-finals
19 April, Carlow
Louth	1-25
Wexford	0-11
19 April, Aughrim
Dublin	2-16
Wicklow	2-14
19 April, Newbridge
Kildare	2-20
Laois	2-15
19 April, Tullamore
Meath	0-25
Westmeath	4-18

Semi-finals
2 May, Portlaoise
Louth	0-10
Dublin	0-20
3 May Tullamore
Kildare	0-23
Westmeath	2-21

Final
17 May, Dublin
Dublin	0-26
Westmeath	2-28

=== All-Ireland Senior Football Championship ===
For the first time ever, Westmeath won five championship games in the same season, this was accomplished with an extra-time victory over Cavan on Saturday 30 May. Tickets for that sold out instantly.

30 May 2026 Round 1	Westmeath	1-31 (34) – (30) 3-21 (a.e.t.)	Cavan	Mullingar
17:00		(HT: 0-12 – 0-06) (FT: 0-22 – 2-16)		Venue: TEG Cusack Park
	Pts: Brandon Kelly 0-6, Ronan Wallace 0-4 (1tp), Senan Baker 0-4 (1tp), Sam McCartan 0-4 (1tpf, 2f), Kevin O'Sullivan 1-0, John Heslin 0-3 (2f), Matthew Whittaker 0-2, Conor Dillon 0-2, Brían Cooney 0-2 (tp), Jack Duncan 0-1, Shane Corcoran 0-1, Robert Forde 0-1, Charlie Drumm 0-1	Report	Pts: Paddy Lynch 1-4 (1tpf, 2f), Dara McVeety 1-1, Tiarnan Madden 0-4 (1tpf, 2f), Darragh Lovett 0-4 (2tp), Conor Casey 0-4 (2tp), Paddy Meade 1-0, Emmanuel Shehu 0-2, Conor Brady 0-1, Ryan Donohue 0-1	Referee: Paddy Neilan (Roscommon); TV: GAA+

14 June 2026 Round 2A	Galway	v	Westmeath	Galway
14:00				Venue: Pearse Stadium
				TV: GAA+
