= 2026 Galway county football team season =

Hurling (sport) season

Galway county football team
2025 season
Manager	Padraig Joyce
Captain	John Maher
All-Ireland SFC	Quarter-Finals	Connacht SFC	Runners-Up
National League	5th
Top scorer Championship	Robert Finnerty (2-23)
Highest SFC attendance	25,400 (v Westmeath 14 June)
Highest Away SFC Attendance	82,000 (v Dublin 28 June)
Lowest SFC attendance	4,843 (v Leitrim 25 April 2026)

The 2026 season was Padraig Joyce's eight year as manager of the Galway senior football team.

In January John Maher was named as captain for 2026 for the first time, with Seán Kelly named as vice-captain.

The team was sponsored for the thirty-second year by Irish fast food restaurant chain Supermac's.

On 28 June 2026, Galway were defeated by Dublin by 1–25 to 1–21 in the Quarter-Finals

== 2026 senior football management team ==
Padraig Joyce continued as manager for the eight year with Cavan Gaels' Mickey Graham continuing as coach. The biggest surprise was that of Kilkerrin-Clonberne's John Divilly leaving the management team after being there since Joyce first started Joyce to remain as Galway football manager until 2028.Milltown's John Concannon and An Cheathrú Rua's Micheál Ó Domhnaill also continued as selectors, with Michelle Heally taking up the roll of performance analyst. Keith Begley was also part of the back-room team as a sport psychologist. Former IRFU Head of Performance, Daragh Sheridan joined the team.

=== 2026 Senior Squad ===
On 23 January 2025 Padraig Joyce announced his 38-man panel for the National League. Under 20 championship players Ciarán Mulhern, Shay McGlinchey, Ryan Roche, Eamonn McGrath were named in the panel.

The following players made their competitive senior debut in 2026.

- Maitias Bairéad vs Armagh on 31 January
- Oisín Mac Donnacha vs Mayo on 25 January.
- Shane McGrath vs Mayo on 25 January.
- Ciarán Mulhern vs Mayo on 25 January.
- Shay McGlinchey vs Mayo on 25 January
- Brian Cogger VS Armagh on 31 January
- Eamonn McGrath vs Kerry on 14 February
- Ryan Roche vs Kerry on 14 February
- Charlie Power vs Kerry on 14 February

== Panel ==
Team as per Galway vs Galway in the 2026 All-Ireland Senior Football Championship Quarter-Final, 29 June 2025

- Number 10 Jersey was retired for this game due to the recent passing of former Galway football and All-Ireland Senior Football Championship winner Paul ClancyGalway two-time All-Ireland winner Paul Clancy dies

No.	Player	Position	Club
1	Connor Gleeson	Goalkeeper	Dunmore MacHales
2	Jack Glynn	Right corner-back	Claregalway
3	Cian Hernon	Full-back	Barna
4	Liam Silke	Left corner-back	Corofin
5	Dylan McHugh	Right half-back	Corofin
6	John Daly	Left half-back	Mountbellew/Moylough
7	Seán Kelly INJ	Centre-back	Moycullen
8	Paul Conroy	Midfield	St James'
9	John Maher(c)	Midfield	Salthill–Knocknacarra
22*	Cein D'Arcy	Right half-forward	Ballyboden St Enda's
11	Shane McGrath	Right half-forward	Dunmore Machales
12	Cillian McDaid	Left half-forward	Monivea-Abbey
13	Robert Finnerty	Right corner-forward	Salthill–Knocknacarra
14	Matthew Tierney	Centre forward	Oughterard
15	Shane Walsh	Full-forward	Kilmacud Crokes

No.	Player	Position	Club
16	Conor Flaherty	Goalkeeper	Claregalway
17	Brian Cogger	Corner-back	Tuam Stars
18	Seán Ó Maoilchiaráin	Full-back	Oileáin Árann
20	Kieran Molloy	Wing-back	Corofin
21	Fionn McDonagh	Centre-back	Moycullen
23	Daniel O'Flaherty	Wing-back	Salthill–Knocknacarra
24	Finnian Ó Laoi	Midfield	An Spidéal
25	Jack Mullen	Wing-forward	Claregalway
26	Damien Comer	Full-forward	Annaghdown
27	Liam Ó Conghaile	Wing-forward	An Spidéal

^{INJ} Player has had an injury which has affected recent involvement with the county team.
^{RET} Player has since retired from the county team.
^{WD} Player has since withdrawn from the county team due to a non-injury issue.

== Competitions ==
=== FBD League ===
Pos	Team	Pld	W	D	L	PF	PA	PD	Pts	Qualification
1	Galway (L)	2	2	0	0	53	18	+35	4	Advance to FBD League Final
2	Mayo	2	2	0	0	42	23	+19	4	Advance to FBD League Final
3	Roscommon	2	1	0	1	41	36	+5	2	Advance to Shield Final
4	Sligo (S)	2	0	1	1	28	34	−6	1	Advance to Shield Final
5	London (P)	2	0	1	1	18	42	−24	1	Advance to Plate Final
6	Leitrim	2	0	0	2	28	57	−29	0	Advance to Plate Final

Source: GalwayGAA.ie
(L) FBD League winners; (P) FBD Plate winners; (S) FBD Shield winners

==== Final ====
Spórt TG4 YouTube

18 January 2026
13:00 IWT (UTC+0)
FBD League Final

Report

Galway	2-12 (18) – (17) 1-14	Mayo
(HT: 2-05 – 0-04)

St Jarlath's Park, Tuam
Referee: D Lyons (Roscommon)

=== Division 1 ===
==== Table ====
Pos	Team	Pld	W	D	L	PF	PA	PD	Pts	Qualification
1	Donegal	7	5	1	1	162	145	+17	11	Advance to NFL Final
2	Kerry (Note: Kerry are ranked ahead of Mayo as they won the head-to-head game between the two teams.)	7	4	2	1	167	134	+33	10	Advance to NFL Final
3	Mayo	7	5	0	2	178	152	+26	10	
4	Roscommon (Note: Roscommon are ranked ahead of Galway as they won the head-to-head game between the two teams.)	7	4	0	3	153	170	−17	8	
5	Galway	7	3	2	2	152	145	+7	8	
6	Armagh	7	2	1	4	169	164	+5	5	
7	Dublin	7	2	0	5	139	143	−4	4	Relegation to 2027 NFL Division 2
8	Monaghan	7	0	0	7	118	185	−67	0	Relegation to 2027 NFL Division 2

Source: GAA.ie
Rules for classification: Tiebreakers

==== Round 1 ====
25 January 2026 Round 1	Galway	2-18 (24) – (27) 3-18	Mayo	Galway
13:45 GMT (UTC+0)		(HT: 0-9 - 1-12)		Venue: Pearse Stadium
	Gls: Fionn McDonagh, Shane McGrath; Pts: Finnian O Laoi, Kieran Molloy, Ciaran Mulhern 3 (1 tp), Daniel O'Flaherty, Fionn McDonagh 4, Rob Finnerty 5, Oisin McDonagh 3 (1 tp)	Report	Gls: Darragh Beirne, Aidan O Shea; Pts: Robbie Hennelly 6 (3 tp), Jack Carney, Ryan O Donoghue 7 (2 tp), Jordan Flynn 2, Darragh Beirne, Fergal Boland	Referee: Conor Lane (Cork); Attendance: 11,515

==== Round 2 ====
31 January 2026 Round 2	Armagh	0-20 (20) – (21) 3-12	Galway	Armagh
17:00 GMT (UTC+0)		(HT: 0-10 - 2-5)		Venue: Athletic Grounds
	Pts: Oisín O'Neill 0-6 (1tpf, 1f), Ross McQullian 0-3, Jarly Óg Burns 0-3, Cian McConville 0-2 (1f), Oisín Conaty 0-2, Tiernan Kelly 0-1, Fergal O'Brien 0-1, Conor Turbitt 0-1, Jason Duffy 0-1	Report	Pts: Rob Finnerty 1-6 (3f), Kieran Molloy 1-0, Matthew Tierney 1-0, Finnian O'Laoi 0-1, Fionn McDonagh 0-1, Cillian McDaid 0-1, Shaw McGlinchey 0-1, Shane Walsh 0-1, Shane McGrath 0-1	Referee: Barry Cassidy (Derry); Attendance: 7,532

==== Round 3 ====
14 February 2026 Round 3	Kerry	2-17 (23) – (23) 3-14	Galway	Tralee
17:00 GMT (UTC+0)		(HT: 2-10 - 1-3)		Venue: Austin Stack Park
	Pts: David Clifford 1-6 (2tp), Micheal Burns 1-2, Cillian Trant 0-3, Keith Evans 0-2, Dylan Casey 0-2, Tony Brosnan 0-1, Joe O'Connor 0-1	Report	Pts: Matthew Tierney 1-4 (1tpf), Shane McGrath 0-5 (2tp), Cian Hernon 1-0, John Maher 1-0, Oisin Mac Donnacha 0-2 (tp), Finnian O Laoi 0-1, Daniel O Flaherty 0-1, Dylan McHugh 0-1	Referee: Paul Faloon (Down)

==== Round 4 ====
21 February 2026 Round 4	Galway	0-21 (21) – (22) 2-16	Roscommon	Galway
19:00 GMT (UTC+0)		(HT: 0-16 - 0-5)		Venue: Pearse Stadium
	Pts: Liam O Conghaile 0-6 (2tp), Rob Finnerty 0-4, Sean Kelly 0-3, Matthew Tierney 0-3 (1tp), John Maher 0-2, Shane McGrath 0-2, Dylan McHugh 0-1	Report	Pts: Daire Cregg 1-7 (2f), Diarmuid Murtagh 0-5 (1tp, 1f), Enda Smith 1-0, Dylan Ruane 0-2 (tp), Ciaran Lennon 0-1, Aaron Brady 0-1 ('45)	Referee: David Coldrick (Meath); Attendance: 6,043

==== Round 5 ====
1 March 2026 Round 5	Donegal	1-17 (20) – (20) 0-20	Galway	Ballyshannon
13:15 GMT (UTC+0)		(HT: 1-7 - 0-13)		Venue: Father Tierney Park
	Pts: Conor O'Donnell 1-2, Michael Murphy 0-3 (1f), Jason McGee 0-2, Jamie Brennan 0-2, Michael Langan 0-2, Gavin Mulreany 0-2 (tpf), Peadar Mogan 0-2 (tp), Finnbarr Roarty0-1, Ryan McHugh 0-1	Report	Pts: Oisin Mac Donnacha 0-8 (3f, 1tp), Ciaran Mulhern 0-3, Shane McGrath 0-2, Robert Finnerty 0-2, Matthew Tierney 0-2, Liam O Conghaile 0-2, Cian Hernon 0-1	Referee: Barry Cassidy (Derry)

==== Round 6 ====
15 March 2026 Round 6	Monaghan	2-9 (15) – (23) 1-20	Galway	Inniskeen
15:45 GMT (UTC+0)		(HT: 0-4 - 1-5)		Venue: Grattan Park
	Pts: Mícheál Bannigan 0-3, Mícheál McCarville 1-0, Dessie Ward 1-0, Jack McCarron 0-2 (tpf), Stephen O'Hanlon 0-2, Rory Beggan 0-2 (tpf)	Report	Pts: Rob Finnerty 0-8 (1tp, 1tpf, 2f), Paul Conroy 0-4 (2tp), Matthew Tierney 0-3, Oisín Mac Donnacha 1-0, Dylan McHugh 0-1, John Maher 0-1, Colm Costello 0-1, Séan Kelly 0-1, Céin D'Arcy 0-1	Referee: Barry Tiernan (Dublin)

==== Round 7 ====
22 March 2026 Round 7	Galway	0-20 (20) – (18) 1-15	Dublin	Galway
15:30 GMT (UTC+0)		(HT: 0-7 - 0-12)		Venue: Pearse Stadium
	Pts: Robert Finnerty 0-8 (2f, 1tp), Oisín Mac Donnacha 0-4 (2f, 1tpf), Cian Hernon 0-2, Paul Conroy 0-2 (1tp), Céin D'Arcy 0-1, Seán Ó Maoilchiaráin 0-1, Liam Ó Conghaile 0-1, Daniel O'Flaherty 0-1	Report	Pts: Killian McGinnis 1-3, Seán Bugler 0-5 (1tp), Hugh O'Sullivan 0-2 (tpf), Ross McGarry 0-2, Ciarán Kilkenny 0-1, Niall O'Callaghan 0-1, Con O'Callaghan 0-1	Referee: Fergal Kelly (Longford); Attendance: 9,274

=== Championship ===
==== Connacht Senior Football Championship ====
Bracket

Quarter-finals
11 April, Ruislip
London	1-15
Mayo	0-31
12 April, New York City
New York	1-10
Roscommon	5-22
12 April, Sligo
Sligo	1-20
Leitrim	3-15

Semi-finals
26 April, Castlebar
Mayo	1-18
Roscommon	2-25
25 April, Carrick-on-Shannon
Leitrim	2-12
Galway	1-20

Final
10 May, Roscommon
Roscommon	3-21
Galway	2-22

===== Semi-Finals =====
25 April 2026 Semi-final	Galway	1-20 (23) – 2-12 (18)	Leitrim	Carrick-on-Shannon
15:30		(HT: 0-11 - 0-4)		Venue: Páirc Seán Mac Diarmada
	Pts: Robert Finnerty 0-4 (1tp, 2f), Paul Conroy 0-3 (1tp), Shane Walsh 0-3 (2f), Liam Ó Conghaile 0-3 (1tp), Dylan McHugh 1-0, Cillian McDade 0-2, Sean Kelly 0-1, Shane McGrath 0-1, John Maher 0-1, Finnian Ó Laoi 0-1, John Daly 0-1	Report	Pts: Oisín McLaughlin 1-1, Killian Gaffey 0-3 (1tp, 1 45), Jack Kelly 1-0, Riordan O'Rourke 0-2, Barry McNulty 0-2 (1tpf), Paul Honeyman 0-2 (1tp), Ben Guckian 0-1 (1f), Ryan O'Rourke 0-1 (1f)	Referee: Niall Cullen (Fermanagh); Attendance: 4,843; TV: GAA+

===== Final =====
10 May 2026 Final	Galway	2-22 (28) – 3-21 (30)	Roscommon	Roscommon
		(HT: 1-14 - 2-8)		Venue: Dr Hyde Park
	Pts: Shane Walsh 0-9 (2tp, 1tpf, 1 45), Damien Comer 1-2, Robert Finnerty 1-1, Paul Conroy 0-4 (2tp), Kieran Molloy 0-2 (tp), Seán Kelly 0-2 (1f), Céin D’Arcy 0-1, Dylan McHugh 0-1.	Report	Pts: Darragh Heneghan 2-2, Diarmuid Murtagh 0-7 (1tpf, 2f), Robert Heneghan 1-0, Conor Ryan 0-3 (1tp), Daire Cregg 0-3 (1tp, 1f), Paul Carey 0-2 (1tp), Dylan Ruane 0-1, Senan Lambe 0-1, Keith Doyle 0-1, Conor Carroll 0-1 (1 45)	Referee: Sean Hurson (Tyrone); Attendance: 22,799; TV: RTÉ2, GAA+

=== 2026 All-Ireland Senior Football Championship ===
===== Team Allocation and Draw =====
- Galway finished the 2026 NFL season inside the top 7.
- Galway were also one of the 8 provincial finalists. This allowed them to be seeded in the draw.

The NFL rankings were as follows:

Place	Team
NFL champions	Donegal
NFL finalists	Kerry
3rd Div 1	Mayo
4th Div 1	Roscommon
5th Div 1	Galway
6th Div 1	Armagh
Div 2 champions	Meath
Div 2 finalists	Cork
7th Div 1	Dublin
8th Div 1	Monaghan
3rd Div 2	Louth
4th Div 2	Derry
5th Div 2	Tyrone
6th Div 2	Cavan
Div 3 champions	Down
Div 3 finalists	Wexford
7th Div 2	Kildare
8th Div 2	Offaly
3rd Div 3	Westmeath
4th Div 3	Sligo
5th Div 3	Laois
6th Div 3	Clare
Div 4 champions	Carlow
Div 4 finalists	Longford
7th Div 3	Limerick
8th Div 3	Fermanagh
3rd Div 4	Wicklow
4th Div 4	Antrim
5th Div 4	Tipperary
6th Div 4	London
7th Div 4	Leitrim
8th Div 4	Waterford
Did not play	New York

Bracket: Rounds 1-3

Round 1; 23–31 May
Galway	3-21 (30)
Kildare	0-17 (17)
Westmeath (a.e.t.)	1-31 (34)
Cavan	3-21 (30)
Roscommon	2-18 (24)
Tyrone	3-16 (25)
Monaghan	2-20 (26)
Mayo	1-24 (27)
Dublin	1-24 (27)
Louth	4-18 (30)
Armagh	1-18 (21)
Derry	1-13 (16)
Kerry	0-16 (16)
Donegal	2-20 (26)
Cork	0-30 (30)
Meath	1-24 (27)

Round 2A; 13/14 June
Galway	3-21 (30)
Westmeath	2-21 (27)
Tyrone	0-22 (22)
Mayo	1-18 (21)
Louth	2-20 (26)
Armagh	2-19 (25)
Donegal	1-13 (16)
Cork	0-17 (17)
Round 2B; 13/14 June
Derry	1-20 (23)
Meath	1-24 (27)
Kildare	0-17 (17)
Kerry	3-22 (31)
Cavan	0-16 (16)
Dublin	1-24 (27)
Monaghan	1-20 (23)
Roscommon	0-14 (14)

Round 3; 20/21 June
Monaghan	1-28 (31)
Westmeath	2-19 (25)
Mayo	0-22 (22)
Meath	2-13 (19)
Kerry	4-18 (30)
Armagh	0-17 (17)
Dublin (a.e.t.)	2-26 (32)
Donegal	2-22 (28)

Quarter-Finalists
Galway	Advance to quarter-final
Monaghan	Advance to quarter-final
Tyrone	Advance to quarter-final
Mayo	Advance to quarter-final
Louth	Advance to quarter-final
Kerry	Advance to quarter-final
Cork	Advance to quarter-final
Dublin	Advance to quarter-final

=== Final stage bracket ===
Quarter-finals; 27/28 June
Louth	0-27 (27)
Monaghan	2-18 (24)
Cork	0-18 (18)
Mayo	0-23 (23)
Tyrone	0-27 (27)
Kerry	2-25 (31)
Galway	1-21 (24)
Dublin	1-25 (28)

Semi-finals; 11/12 July
Louth	0-15 (15)
Mayo	3-23 (32)
Kerry	2-18 (24)
Dublin	0-20 (20)

Final; 26 July
Mayo	1-20 (23)
Kerry	1-17 (20)

==== Round 1 ====
23 May 2026 Round 1	Galway	3-21 (30) – (17) 0-17	Kildare	Galway
19:30		(HT: 2-08 – 0-10)		Venue: Pearse Stadium
	Pts: Robert Finnerty 1-9, Shane Walsh 0-6 (1tp, 1tpf, 1f), Céin D'arcy 1-0, Matthew Tierney 1-0, Cillian McDaid 0-2, John Maher 0-1, Paul Conroy 0-1, Damien Comer 0-1, Shane McGrath 0-1	Report	Pts: Alex Beirne 0-5 (2tp, 1f), Darragh Kirwan 0-3 (1tp), Brian McLoughlin 0-3 (1tp), Jack Robinson 0-2, Colm Dalton 0-1, Darragh Swords 0-1, Kevin Feely 0-1, Ben Loakman 0-1	Referee: Paul Faloon (Down); TV: RTÉ2

==== Round 2A ====
14 June 2026 Round 2A	Galway	3-21 (30) – (27) 2-21	Westmeath	Galway
14:00		(HT: 3-09 – 1-08)		Venue: Pearse Stadium
	Pts: Shane Walsh 1-4 (1f), Matthew Tierney 1-2, Paul Conroy 0-5 (1tp), Cian Hernon 1-0, Robert Finnerty 0-3, Céin D'Arcy 0-2, Shane McGrath 0-2, Kieran Molloy 0-1, Seán Kelly 0-1, Daniel O'Flaherty 0-1	Report	Pts: Ronan Wallace 1-2 (1tp), Sam McCartan 0-4 (1tp), John Heslin 0-4 (4f), Jack Duncan 1-0, Robbie Forde 0-2 (tp), Brandon Kelly 0-2, Tadhg Baker 0-2, Senan Baker 0-2 (1m), Ray Connellan 0-1, Brían Cooney 0-1, Kevin O'Sullivan 0-1	Referee: Brendan Griffin (Kerry); Attendance: 25,400; TV: GAA+

==== Quarter-Finals ====
28 June 2026 Quarter-final	Galway	1-21 (24) – (28) 1-25	Dublin	Dublin
16:00		(HT: 0-13 – 0-14)		Venue: Croke Park
	Pts: Robert Finnerty 0-6 (2tp, 1f), Céin D'Arcy 0-4 (1tp), John Maher 1-0, Kieran Molloy 0-3, Finnian Ó Laoi 0-2, Dylan McHugh 0-2, Paul Conroy 0-2 (tp), Cillian McDaid 0-1, Shane Walsh 0-1	Report	Pts: Con O'Callaghan 1-7 (1pen, 3f), Niall Scully 0-4 (2tp), Paddy Small 0-4 (1tp), Colm Basquel 0-4 (1tp), Cormac Costello 0-4 (2f), Eoin Kennedy 0-1, Seán Guiden 0-1	Referee: David Gough (Meath); Attendance: 82,000; TV: RTÉ One

== Statistics (League & Championship) ==
=== Scorers ===
Rank	Player	Club	Tally	Total
1	Robert Finnerty	Salthill Knocknacarra	4-57	69
2	Shane Walsh	Kilmacud Crokes	1-38	41
3	Matthew Tierney	Oughterard	4-17	29
4	Paul Conroy	St James'	0-22	22
5	Oisín Mac Donnacha	Leitir Móir	1-14	17
6	Shane McGrath	Dunmore MacHales	1-13	16
7	Cian Hernon	Bearna	2-05	11
8	John Maher	Salthill Knocknacarra	1-07	10
8	Céin D'Arcy	Ballyboden St Enda's	1-07	10
8	Liam Ó Conghaile	Spideal	0–10	10
11	Cillian McDaid	Monivea Abbey	0-07	7
11	Seán Kelly	Maigh Cullen	0-07	7
11	Dylan McHugh	Mountbellew/Moylough	1–04	7
13	Kieran Molloy	Corofin	0-06	6
14	Daniel O'Flaherty	Salthill Knocknacarra	0-5	5
15	John Daly	Mountbellew/Moylough	0–21	21
15	Seán Ó Maoilchiaráin	Oileáin Árann		21
15	Colm Costello	Dunmore MacHales		21
