= Jack Cooney =

Westmeath Gaelic footballer and manager

Personal information
- Born: 1971 (age 54–55)

Sport
Club
- Years: Club
- Coralstown/Kinnegad
Inter-county
- Years: County
- 1988–2000: Westmeath

Jack Cooney (born 1971) is a Gaelic football manager and former player for the Westmeath county team. He was manager of the Westmeath county team between 2018 and 2022.

== Playing career ==
Cooney began playing for Westmeath when he was 17 years of age, which was in 1988, and after playing became involved as a selector, including with the Páidí Ó Sé-led 2004 Leinster Senior Football Championship Final-winning team.

He stopped playing for Westmeath in 2000, when he was 29 years of age.

He played for Westmeath for twelve years, coaching the team for six years under the management of Páidí Ó Sé, Tomás Ó Flatharta and Luke Dempsey before the county board gave him the senior managerial job.

== Managerial career ==
Cooney managed Coralstown/Kinnegad to the 2011 Westmeath Intermediate Football Championship title.

He first applied for the Westmeath senior managerial position in 2014. A selector under Páidí Ó Sé, Cooney's appointment as Westmeath senior manager was ratified in September 2018, making him the first Westmeath native to fill the role since 1992.

He nearly led Westmeath to a Leinster final in 2021 but Kildare prevented this.

On 23 September 2021, he was ratified for a further two-year term ahead of the 2022 season. However, Cooney resigned unexpectedly in August 2022 to take up a player development role at national level within the GAA.

Cooney's club management experience before the Westmeath senior appointment involved managerial roles with Rhode, Newbridge and his home club Coralstown/Kinnegad.

Cooney is a former Donegal selector too.

== Personal life ==
Cooney is married to a woman from Kilcar. His son Brían has played for Westmeath, including in the 2026 Leinster Senior Football Championship final, when he attempted a two-pointer only for the ball to sail over Dublin goalkeeper Evan Comerford and in to the net for a goal and three points.

Sporting positions
Preceded by Colin Kelly	Westmeath Senior Football Manager; 2018–2022	Succeeded by Dessie Dolan
