= Jonathan Lynam =

Westmeath Gaelic footballer

Personal information
- Nickname: Johnny

Sport
- Sport: Gaelic football
Club
- Years: Club
- The Downs
Inter-county
- Years: County
- 2022–: Westmeath

Jonathan Lynam is a Gaelic footballer who plays for The Downs at club level and for Westmeath county team at senior level.

Known as Johnny, Lynam made his debut for Westmeath senior team in a match against Kildare in the 2022 O'Byrne Cup in Newbridge. Lynam's first start came in the 2022 National League opening game against Wicklow. By the end of the season, he could count himself as a Tailteann Cup champion. In the first game of the Tailteann Cup, he was involved in an incident that resulted in a Laois player receiving a second yellow card, reducing Laois to 14 players.

He scored two goals in the 2024 NFL Division 3 final as Westmeath claimed the title, and was included on the Sigerson Cup Team of the Year the same week.

He played in the final when Westmeath won the 2026 O'Byrne Cup. He scored two first-half goals in what proved to be a narrow victory against Sligo in the 2026 National League. He was missing, injured, for the 2026 Leinster Senior Football Championship, only a second ever title win for Westmeath.

== Honours ==
The Downs

- Westmeath Senior Football Championship (1): 2022

Westmeath

- Tailteann Cup (1): 2022
- National Football League Division 3 (1): 2024
- O'Byrne Cup (1): 2026

UCD

• GAA Higher Education Rising Stars Football Team: 2024
