= 2026 Leinster Senior Football Championship final =

- Event: 2026 Leinster Senior Football Championship
Dublin	Westmeath
0–26 (26)	2–28 (34)
- A.E.T.
- Date: 17 May 2026
- Venue: Croke Park, Dublin
- Referee: David Coldrick (Meath)
- Attendance: 36,536

The 2026 Leinster Senior Football Championship final was the culmination of the 2026 Leinster Senior Football Championship; one of four provincial championships and part of the 2026 All-Ireland Senior Football Championship.

The game was won by Westmeath who defeated Dublin in extra-time by 8 points, with a score of 2-28 (34) to 0-26 (26). The win meant manager Mark McHugh joined his father Martin in winning the Ulster Senior Football Championship for Donegal as a player and an unexpected provincial title as manager of a different team. David Coldrick of Meath was the referee. The game was played at Croke Park, Dublin on Sunday 17 May 2026 and was preceded by the Ladies' Gaelic Football Leinster Senior Championship final between Dublin and Kildare.

Dublin appeared in their 20th Leinster final in 22 years, after losing a 14-year winning streak after a loss to Meath the year previous. Westmeath played in their first Leinster final since 2016, and were looking to win their first Leinster Championship since 2004.

== Paths to the final ==
=== Dublin ===
==== Dublin vs Wicklow ====
Dublin entered the championship at the quarter-final stage, where they faced Wicklow at Echelon Park, Aughrim, County Wicklow. Despite being strong favourites for this game along with the championship, Dublin managed to escape with a narrow 2 point win in a game where Wicklow goalkeeper Mark Jackson hit 6 frees wide, 5 of them being for 2-pointers.

19 April 2026 Quarter-Final	Dublin	2-16 (22) – (20) 2-14	Wicklow	Aughrim
15:00 IST (UTC+1)		(HT: 1-11 - 1-7)		Venue: Echelon Park
	Pts: Paddy Small 1-6 (2tp), Seán Bugler 0-5, Charlie McMorrow 1-0, Killian McGinnis 0-2 (tp), Con O'Callaghan 0-1 (f), Colm Basquel 0-1, Niall Scully 0-1	Report	Pts: Eoin Darcy 2-2 (1pen), Dean Healy 0-5 (2tp), Oisín McGraynor 0-4 (1tpf, 1f), Pádraig O'Toole 0-1, Cian Deering 0-1, Christopher O'Brien 0-1	Referee: Conor Dourneen (Cavan)

==== Dublin vs Louth ====
In the semi-final they faced Leinster holders Louth in Portlaoise, who came into the game as favourites against Dublin. Despite this, Dublin came away as 10 point winners and headed into the Leinster final as favourites themselves.

2 May 2026 Semi-Final	Louth	0-10 (10) – (20) 0-20	Dublin	Portlaoise
19:00 IST (UTC+1)		(HT: 0-6 - 0-8)		Venue: Laois Hire O'Moore Park
	Pts: Sam Mulroy 0-3 (2'45), Ryan Burns 0-2 (tp), Dara McDonnell 0-2, Conor Grimes 0-1, Emmet Carolan 0-1, Kieran McArdle 0-1	Report	Pts: Cormac Costello 0-10 (1tp, 3f), Paddy Small 0-4 (1s/l) Charlie McMorrow 0-2, Nathan Doran 0-1, Niall Scully 0-1, Brian Howard 0-1, Luke Breathnach 0-1	Referee: Brendan Griffin (Kerry); TV: GAA+

=== Westmeath ===
==== Westmeath vs Longford ====
Westmeath began their championship campaign in the preliminary quarter-final against Longford, coming out as 21 point winners scoring 40 points in total.

12 April 2026 Preliminary Round	Longford	1-16 (19) – (40) 5-25	Westmeath	Longford
15:00 IST (UTC+1)		(HT: 1-8 - 5-9)		Venue: Glennon Brothers Pearse Park
	Pts: Dylan Farrell 0-10 (4tpf, 1f), Dessie Reynolds 0-4 (2tp), James Moran 1-0, Daniel Reynolds 0-1, Paddy Moran 0-1	Report	Pts: Luke Loughlin 2-2, Brandon Kelly 2-1, Shane Corcoran 1-4, Ray Connellan 0-5 (2tp), Matthew Whittaker 0-3, Conor Dillon 0-3, Sam McCartan 0-2 (tpf), Tom Molloy 0-2, Ronan Wallace 0-1, Kevin O'Sullivan 0-1, Brían Cooney 0-1	Referee: Kieran Eannetta (Tyrone); Attendance: 1,500

==== Westmeath vs Meath ====
Westmeath then went on to play Meath in the quarter-final in Glenisk O'Connor Park, Tullamore, County Offaly. Defying the odds against what were many people's Leinster favourites, Westmeath defeated Meath with a last-minute goal sealing a 5 point win.

19 April 2026 Quarter-Final	Meath	0-25 (25) – (30) 4-18	Westmeath	Tullamore
14:00 IST (UTC+1)		(HT: 0-9 - 2-9)		Venue: Glenisk O'Connor Park
	Pts: Ruairí Kinsella 0-6 (2tp), Eoghan Frayne 0-4 (1tpf), James Conlon 0-4, Jack Flynn 0-3 (1tp), Jordan Morris 0-3 (2f), Jack O'Connor 0-2, Aaron Lynch 0-2, Bryan Menton 0-1	Report	Pts: Luke Loughlin 0-6 (1tp), Shane Corcoran 1-2, Sam McCartan 0-4 (3f), Matthew Whittaker 1-0, Robbie Forde 1-0, Danny McCartan 1-0, Ray Connellan 0-2, Brandon Kelly 0-2 (1m), Brian Cooney 0-1, Kevin O'Sullivan 0-1	Referee: Liam Devenney (Mayo); Attendance: 9,184

==== Westmeath vs Kildare ====
In the semi-final Westmeath confronted Kildare for a place in the Leinster final. They once again played in Tullamore. Despite a last second equaliser from Kildare's Alex Beirne to send the game to extra-time, Westmeath came out as 4 point winners to send them to their first Leinster final in 10 years.

3 May 2026 Semi-Final	Kildare	0-23 (23) – (27) 2-21 (a.e.t.)	Westmeath	Tullamore
14:00 IST (UTC+1)		(HT: 0-10 - 1-8) (FT: 0-19 - 1-16)		Venue: Glenisk O'Connor Park
	Pts: Eoin Cully 0-4, Darragh Kirwan 0-4, Ben Loakman 0-3, Alex Beirne 0-3 (1tpf), Darragh Swords 0-2 (tp), Tommy Gill 0-1, Kevin Feely 0-1, Callum Bolton 0-1, Brian McLoughlin 0-1 (f), Colm Moran 0-1	Report	Pts: Brandon Kelly 1-4, Sam McCartan 0-5 (2tpf), Brían Cooney 1-0, Ray Connellan 0-2 (1f), Senan Baker 0-2, Shane Corcoran 0-1, Kevin O'Sullivan 0-1, Tadhg Baker 0-1, Shane Allen 0-1, Ronan Wallace 0-1, Charlie Drumm 0-1, Robbie Forde 0-1, Eoghan McCabe 0-1	Referee: Martin McNally (Monaghan); TV: GAA+

== Match ==
=== Summary ===
The hotter failed to honk at half-time.

=== Details ===
RTÉ2, GAA+

10 May 2025
14:00 IST (UTC+1)
Final

Report

Dublin	0–26 (26) – (34) 2–28 (a.e.t.)	Westmeath
(HT: 0–11 – 0–9) (FT: 0–22 – 0–22)
Pts: Cormac Costello 0-8 (4f, 1tpf), Ciarán Kilkenny 0-3, Niall Scully 0-2, Paddy Small 0-2, David Byrne 0-2, Seán Bugler 0-2, Seán Guiden 0-2 (tp), Greg McEneaney 0-2, Eoin Kennedy 0-1, Luke Breathnach 0-1, Brian Howard 0-1		Pts: Jack Duncan 1-1, Brandon Kelly 0-4, Matthew Whittaker 0-4 (1tp), Senan Baker 0-4, Brían Cooney 1-0, Ronan Wallace 0-3, John Heslin 0-3 (1tp, 1f), Kevin O'Sullivan 0-2, Shane Allen 0-2 (tp), Sam McCartan 0-2, Shane Corcoran 0-1, Conor Dillon 0-1, Robbie Forde 0-1

Croke Park, Dublin
Referee: David Coldrick (Meath)
Attendance: 36,536

Dublin	Westmeath

GK	1	Evan Comerford
FB	2	Theo Clancy	(substituted off) 59'
FB	3	Nathan Doran
FB	4	David Byrne
HB	5	Seán MacMahon	(substituted off) 85'
HB	6	Charlie McMorrow	(substituted off) 75'
HB	7	Eoin Kennedy	(substituted off) 65'
MF	8	Peadar Ó Cofaigh Byrne	(substituted off) 16'
MF	9	Brian Howard
HF	10	Seán Bugler
HF	11	Niall Scully (c)	(substituted off) 78'
HF	12	Ciarán Kilkenny
FF	13	Paddy Small
FF	14	Killian McGinnis
FF	15	Cormac Costello
Substitutes:
	16	Hugh O'Sullivan
	17	Tom Lahiff
	18	Liam Smith	(substituted on) 59'
	19	Cian O'Connor	(substituted on) 78'
	20	Cian Murphy	(substituted on) 75'
	21	Seán Guiden	(substituted on) 61'
	22	Ethan Dunne	(substituted on) 85'
	23	Páidí White
	24	Niall O'Callaghan
	25	Luke Breathnach	(substituted on) 16' (substituted off) 61'
	26	Greg McEneaney	(substituted on) 65'
Manager:
Ger Brennan

GK	1	Jason Daly
FB	2	Daniel Scahill	(substituted off) 18'
FB	3	Charlie Drumm
FB	4	Tadhg Baker	(substituted off) 84'
HB	5	Ronan Wallace (c)
HB	6	Shane Allen	(substituted off) 71'
HB	7	Matthew Whittaker	(substituted off) 59'
MF	8	Brían Cooney	(substituted off) 86'
MF	9	Ray Connellan	(substituted off) 83'
HF	10	Kevin O'Sullivan
HF	11	Sam McCartan
HF	12	Connor Dillon	(substituted off) 61'
FF	13	Shane Corcoran	(substituted off) 43' (substituted on) 71'
FF	14	Jack Duncan	(substituted off) 36' (substituted on) 71'
FF	15	Brandon Kelly	(substituted off) 71'
Substitutes:
	16	Jack Connaughton
	17	Adam Treanor	(substituted on) 18'
	18	Tom Molloy	(substituted on) 86'
	19	Robert Forde	(substituted on) 36'
	20	Ian Martin	(substituted on) 84'
	21	TJ Cox
	22	Shane Ormsby	(substituted on) 59'
	23	Danny McCartan
	24	Eoghan McCabe	(substituted on) 83'
	25	Senan Baker	(substituted on) 43'
	26	John Heslin	(substituted on) 61'
Manager:
Mark McHugh

Man of the Match:

Ray Connellan (Westmeath)

== Aftermath ==
Ray Connellan gave a calm post-match interview. He was later named as GAA.ie Footballer of the Week.
