= 2026 Leinster Senior Football Championship =

Gaelic football competition

2026 Leinster SFC
Tournament details
- Province: Leinster
- Year: 2026
- Trophy: Delaney Cup
- Date: 11 April – 17 May 2026
- Defending champions: Louth

Winners
- Champions: Westmeath (2nd win)
- Manager: Mark McHugh
- Captain: Ronan Wallace

Runners-up
- Runners-up: Dublin

Other
- Matches played: 10

The 2026 Leinster Senior Football Championship was the 2026 iteration of the annual Leinster Senior Football Championship organised by Leinster GAA. It was one of the four provincial competitions of the 2026 All-Ireland Senior Football Championship. The winning team received the Delaney Cup. The draw for the championship was made on 27 November 2025.

The defending champions are Louth.

Westmeath defeated Dublin by 2-28 – 0-26 in the final to win their 2nd ever Leinster SFC and their first since 2004.

== Teams ==
=== General Information ===
Eleven counties are competing in the Leinster Senior Football Championship:

| County | Last Championship Title | Last All-Ireland Title | Position in 2025 Championship |
|---|---|---|---|
| Carlow | 1944 | - | Preliminary round |
| Dublin | 2024 | 2023 | Semi-finals |
| Kildare | 2000 | 1928 | Semi-finals |
| Laois | 2003 | - | Quarter-finals |
| Longford | 1968 | - | Preliminary round |
| Louth | 2025 | 1957 | Champions |
| Meath | 2010 | 1999 | Runners-Up |
| Offaly | 1997 | 1982 | Quarter-finals |
| Westmeath | 2004 | - | Quarter-finals |
| Wexford | 1945 | 1918 | Preliminary round |
| Wicklow | - | - | Quarter-finals |

=== Personnel and Kits ===
| County | Manager(s) | Captain(s) | Sponsors |
|---|---|---|---|
| Carlow | Joe Murphy | Mikey Bambrick | MW Hire Group |
| Dublin | Ger Brennan | Con O'Callaghan | Staycity Aparthotels |
| Kildare | Brian Flanagan | Kevin Feely | Brady Family Ham |
| Laois | Justin McNulty | Brian Byrne | Laois Hire |
| Longford | Mike Solan | Paddy Fox | Glennon Brothers |
| Louth | Gavin Devlin | Sam Mulroy | STATSports |
| Meath | Robbie Brennan | Eoghan Frayne | Bective Stud, Tea Rooms & Apartments |
| Offaly | Mickey Harte Declan Kelly | Lee Pearson | Glenisk |
| Westmeath | Mark McHugh | Ronan Wallace | TEG |
| Wexford | John Hegarty | Eoghan Nolan | Zurich Insurance |
| Wicklow | Oisín McConville | Dean Healy | Echelon Data Centres |

== Draw ==
=== Pot 1 ===
- Dublin
- Kildare
- Louth
- Meath

=== Pot 2 ===
- Carlow
- Laois
- Wexford
- Offaly
- Westmeath
- Wexford
- Wicklow

== Bracket ==
Preliminary round
12 April, Carlow
Carlow | 1-7
Wicklow | 2-15
11 April, Tullamore
Offaly | 0-12
Laois | 3-12
12 April, Longford
Longford | 1-16
Westmeath | 5-25

Quarter-finals
19 April, Carlow
Louth | 1-25
Wexford | 0-11
19 April, Aughrim
Dublin | 2-16
Wicklow | 2-14
19 April, Newbridge
Kildare | 2-20
Laois | 2-15
19 April, Tullamore
Meath | 0-25
Westmeath | 4-18

Semi-finals
2 May, Portlaoise
Louth | 0-10
Dublin | 0-20
3 May Tullamore
Kildare | 0-23
Westmeath | 2-21

Final
17 May, Dublin
Dublin | 0-26
Westmeath | 2-28

== Preliminary round ==
| 11 April 2026 Preliminary round | Offaly | 0-12 (12) – (21) 3-12 | Laois | Tullamore |
| 18:00 | | (HT: 0-8 - 2-7) | | Venue: Glenisk O'Connor Park |
| | Pts: Dylan Hyland 0-5 (1tpf, 1f), Keith O'Neill 0-2, Cormac Egan 0-1, Jordan Hayes 0-1, Diarmuid Egan 0-1, Marcus Dalton 0-1, Harry Plunkett 0-1 | Report | Pts: Evan O'Carroll 0-5, Kevin Swayne 1-0, Ciaran Burke 1-0, Simon Fingleton 1-0, Ronan Coffey 0-2, Paul Kingston 0-2 (1f), Padraig Kirwan 0-1, Rioghan Murphy 0-1, Robert Tyrrell 0-1 | Referee: Paul Faloon (Down); Attendance: 2,841 |

| 12 April 2026 Preliminary round | Carlow | 1-07 (10) – (21) 2-15 | Wicklow | Carlow |
| 14:30 | | (HT: 0-4 - 0-8) | | Venue: Dr Cullen Park |
| | | Report | | Referee: Sean Lonergan (Tipperary) |

| 12 April 2026 Preliminary round | Westmeath | 5-25 (40) – (19) 1-16 | Longford | Longford |
| 15:00 | | (HT: 5-9 - 1-8) | | Venue: Pearse Park |
| | Gls: Luke Loughlin 2, Brandon Kelly 2, Shane Corcoran 1 Pts: Luke Loughlin 2-2, Brandon Kelly 2-2, Shane Corcoran 1-4, Ray Connellan 0-5 (2tp), Matthew Whittaker, Conor Dillon 0-3 each, Tom Molloy, Sam McCartan (1tpf) 0-2 each, Ronan Wallace, Kevin O'Sullivan 0-1 each | Report | Gls: James Moran 1 Pts: Dylan Farrell 0-10 (4tpf, 1f), Dessie Reynolds 0-4 (2tp), James Moran 1-0, Daniel Reynolds, Paddy Moran 0-1 each | Referee: Kieran Eannetta (Tyrone); Attendance: 1,500 |

== Quarter-finals ==
| 19 April 2026 Quarter-final | Meath | 0-25 (25) – (30) 4-18 | Westmeath | Tullamore |
| 14:00 | | (HT: 0-9 – 2-9) | | Venue: O'Connor Park |
| | Pts: Ruari Kinsella 0-6 (2tp), Eoghan Frayne 0-4 (1tp), James Conlon 0-4, Jack Flynn 0-4 (1tp), Jordan Morris 0-3 (2f), Jack O'Connor 0-2, Aaron Lynch 0-2, Bryan Menton 0-1 | Report | Pts: Luke Loughlin 0-6 (1tp), Shane Corcoran 1-2, Sam McCartan 0-4 (3f), Matthew Whittaker 1-0, Robbie Forde 1-0, Danny McCartan 1-0, Ray Connellan 0-2, Brandon Kelly 0-2, Brían Cooney 0-1, Kevin O'Sullivan 0-1 | Referee: Barry Cassidy (Derry); Attendance: 9,184 |

| 19 April 2026 Quarter-final | Louth | 1-25 (28) – (11) 0-11 | Wexford | Carlow |
| 14:30 | | (HT: 0-14 – 0-5) | | Venue: Dr Cullen Park |
| | Pts: Sam Mulroy 1-4 (1 pen, 1tp, 2f), Ciarán Keenan 0-1 (1tp), Tadhg McDonnell 0-4, Conor Early 0-3, Conall McCaul 0-3, Dara McDonnell 0-3, Ryan Burns 0-1, Ciarán Downey 0-1, Sean Reynolds 0-1, Paul Mathews 0-1 | Report | Pts: Mark Rossiter 0-7 (1tpf, 3f), Michael Kinsella 0-2, Cathal Kehoe 0-1, Tom Byrne 0-1 | Referee: Martin McNally (Monaghan |

| 19 April 2026 Quarter-final | Wicklow | 2-14 (20) – (22) 2-16 | Dublin | Aughrim |
| 15:00 | | (HT: 1-7 - 1-11) | | Venue: Aughrim Park |
| | Pts: Eoin Darcy 2-2 (1 pen), Dean Healy 0-5 (2tp), Oisin McGraynor 0-4 (1tpf, 1f), Padraig O'Toole 0-1, Cian Deering 0-1, Christopher O'Brien 0-1 | Report | Pts: Paddy Small 1-6 (2tp), Seán Bugler 0-5, Charlie McMorrow 1-0, Killian McGinnis 0-2 (1tp), Con O'Callaghan 0-1 (1f), Colm Basquel 0-1, Niall Scully 0-1 | Referee: Conor Dourneen (Cavan) |

| 19 April 2026 Quarter-final | Kildare | 2-20 (26) – (21) 2-15 | Laois | Newbridge |
| 15:45 | | (HT: 1-10 – 2-7) | | Venue: St Conleth's Park |
| | Pts: Darragh Kirwan 1-4 (1tp), Eoin Cully 0-5, Ben Loakman 1-2 (1f), Ben McCormack 0-4, Darragh Swords 0-2, Tommy Gill 0-2, Kevin Feely 0-1 | Report | Pts: Paul Kingston 1-3 (1f), Daragh Galvin 1-2, Evan O'Carroll 0-3, Killian Roche 0-3 (1tpf, 1 45), Kevin Swayne 0-1, Ronan Coffey 0-1, Patrick O'Sullivan 0-1, Cian Nolan 0-1 | Referee: Conor Lane (Cork) |

== Semi-finals ==
| 2 May 2026 Semi-final | Louth | 0-10 (10) – (20) 0-20 | Dublin | Portlaoise |
| 19:00 | | (HT: 0-6 – 0-8) | | Venue: O'Moore Park |
| | Pts: Sam Mulroy 0-3 (2 45s), Ryan Burns 0-2 (1tp), Dara McDonnell 0-2, Conor Grimes 0-1, Emmet Carolan 0-1, Kieran McArdle 0-1 | Report | Pts: Cormac Costello 0-10 (1tpf, 3f), Paddy Small 0-4 (1 s/l), Charlie McMorrow 0-2, Nathan Doran 0-1, Niall Scully 0-1, Brian Howard 0-1, Luke Breathnach 0-1 | Referee: Brendan Griffin (Kerry); TV: GAA+ |

| 3 May 2026 Semi-final | Westmeath | 2-21 (27) – (23) 0-23 (a.e.t.) | Kildare | Tullamore |
| 19:00 | | (HT: 1-8 – 0-10) (FT: 1-16 – 0-19) | | Venue: O'Connor Park |
| | Pts: Brandon Kelly 1-4, Sam McCartan 0-5 (2tpf), Brían Cooney 1-0, Ray Connellan 0-2 (1f), Senan Baker 0-2, Shane Corcoran 0-1, Kevin O'Sullivan 0-1, Tadhg Baker 0-1, Shane Allen 0-1, Ronan Wallace 0-1, Charlie Drumm 0-1, Robbie Forde 0-1, Eoghan McCabe 0-1 | Report | Pts: Eoin Cully 0-4, Darragh Kirwan 0-4, Ben Loakman 0-3, Alex Beirne 0-3 (1tpf), Darragh Swords 0-2 (1tp), Jack Robinson 0-2, Tommy Gill 0-1, Kevin Feely 0-1, Callum Bolton 0-1, Brian McLoughlin 0-1 (1f), Colm Moran 0-1 | Referee: Martin McNally (Monaghan); Attendance: 12,086; TV: GAA+ |

== Final ==
| 17 May 2026 Final | Dublin | 0-26 (26) – (34) 2-28 (a.e.t.) | Westmeath | Dublin |
| 14:00 | | (HT: 0-11 – 0-09) (FT: 0-22 – 0-22) | | Venue: Croke Park |
| | Pts: Cormac Costello 0-8 (4f, 1 tpf), Ciarán Kilkenny 0-3, Niall Scully 0-2, Paddy Small 0-2, David Byrne 0-2, Seán Bugler 0-2, Seán Guiden 0-2 (tp), Greg McEneaney 0-2, Eoin Kennedy 0-1, Luke Breathnach 0-1, Brian Howard 0-1 | Report | Pts: Jack Duncan 1-1, Brandon Kelly 0-4, Matthew Whittaker 0-4 (1 tp), Senan Baker 0-4, Brían Cooney 1-0, Ronan Wallace 0-3, John Heslin 0-3 (1 tp, 1f), Kevin O'Sullivan 0-2, Shane Allen 0-2 (tp), Sam McCartan 0-2, Shane Corcoran 0-1, Conor Dillon 0-1, Robbie Forde 0-1 | Referee: David Coldrick (Meath); TV: RTÉ2 |

| GK | 1 | Evan Comerford |
| FB | 2 | Theo Clancy | (substituted off) 59' |
| FB | 3 | Nathan Doran |
| FB | 4 | David Byrne |
| HB | 5 | Seán MacMahon | (substituted off) 85' |
| HB | 6 | Charlie McMorrow | (substituted off) 75' |
| HB | 7 | Eoin Kennedy | (substituted off) 65' |
| MF | 8 | Peadar Ó Cofaigh Byrne | (substituted off) 16' |
| MF | 9 | Brian Howard |
| HF | 10 | Seán Bugler |
| HF | 11 | Niall Scully | (substituted off) 78' |
| HF | 12 | Ciarán Kilkenny |
| FF | 13 | Paddy Small (c) |
| FF | 14 | Killian McGinnis |
| FF | 15 | Cormac Costello |
Substitutes:
| | 16 | Hugh O'Sullivan |
| | 17 | Tom Lahiff |
| | 18 | Liam Smith | (substituted on) 59' |
| | 19 | Cian O'Connor | (substituted on) 78' |
| | 20 | Cian Murphy | (substituted on) 75' |
| | 21 | Seán Guiden | (substituted on) 61' |
| | 22 | Ethan Dunne | (substituted on) 85' |
| | 23 | Páidí White |
| | 24 | Niall O'Callaghan |
| | 25 | Luke Breathnach | (substituted on) 16' (substituted off) 61' |
| | 26 | Greg McEneaney | (substituted on) 65' |
Manager:
Ger Brennan

| GK | 1 | Jason Daly |
| FB | 2 | Daniel Scahill | (substituted off) 18' |
| FB | 3 | Charlie Drumm |
| FB | 4 | Tadhg Baker | (substituted off) 84' |
| HB | 5 | Ronan Wallace (c) |
| HB | 6 | Shane Allen | (substituted off) 71' |
| HB | 7 | Matthew Whittaker | (substituted off) 59' |
| MF | 8 | Brían Cooney | (substituted off) 86' |
| MF | 9 | Ray Connellan | (substituted off) 83' |
| HF | 10 | Kevin O'Sullivan |
| HF | 11 | Sam McCartan |
| HF | 12 | Connor Dillon | (substituted off) 61' |
| FF | 13 | Shane Corcoran | (substituted off) 43' (substituted on) 71' |
| FF | 14 | Jack Duncan | (substituted off) 36' (substituted on) 71' |
| FF | 15 | Brandon Kelly | (substituted off) 71' |
Substitutes:
| | 16 | Jack Connaughton |
| | 17 | Adam Treanor | (substituted on) 18' |
| | 18 | Tom Molloy | (substituted on) 86' |
| | 19 | Robert Forde | (substituted on) 36' |
| | 20 | Ian Martin | (substituted on) 84' |
| | 21 | TJ Cox |
| | 22 | Shane Ormsby | (substituted on) 59' |
| | 23 | Danny McCartan |
| | 24 | Eoghan McCabe | (substituted on) 83' |
| | 25 | Senan Baker | (substituted on) 43' |
| | 26 | John Heslin | (substituted on) 61' |
Manager:
Mark McHugh

== Stadia and attendance ==
| County | Location | Province | Stadium | Capacity |
|---|---|---|---|---|
| Carlow | Carlow | Leinster | Dr Cullen Park | 21,000 |
| Dublin | Dublin | Leinster | Croke Park | 82,300 |
| Kildare | Newbridge | Leinster | St Conleth's Park | 15,000 |
| Laois | Portlaoise | Leinster | O'Moore Park | 22,000 |
| Longford | Longford | Leinster | Pearse Park | 10,000 |
| Louth | Drogheda | Leinster | Drogheda Park | 3,500 |
| Meath | Navan | Leinster | Páirc Tailteann (Note: Due to Páirc Tailltean being renovated, Meath played their "home games" at Croke Park during the 2026 season.) | 11,000 |
| Offaly | Tullamore | Leinster | O'Connor Park | 18,000 |
| Westmeath | Mullingar | Leinster | Cusack Park | 11,000 |
| Wexford | Wexford | Leinster | Chadwicks Wexford Park | 18,000 |
| Wicklow | Aughrim | Leinster | Aughrim County Ground | 7,000 |

== Statistics ==
=== Scoring Events ===
Does not include scores after extra-time

- Widest winning margin: 21 points
  - Westmeath 5-25 – 1-16 Longford (Preliminary round)
- Most goals in a match: 6
  - Westmeath 5-25 – 1-16 Longford (Preliminary round)
- Most points in a match: 44
  - Westmeath 0-22 – 0-22 Dublin (Final)
- Most goals by one team in a match: 5
  - Westmeath 5-25 – 1-16 Longford (Preliminary round)
- Most points by one team in a match: 25 points
  - Westmeath 5-25 – 1-16 Longford (Preliminary round)
  - Meath 0-25 – 4-18 Westmeath (Quarter-finals)
  - Louth 1-25 – 0-11 Wexford (Quarter-finals)
- Highest aggregate score: 59 points
  - Westmeath 5-25 – 1-16 Longford (Preliminary round)
- Lowest aggregate score: 30 points
  - Dublin 0-20 – 0-10 Louth (Semi-finals)
