= Ollie Baker =

Irish hurler

Personal information
- Native name: Olibhéar Báicéir (Irish)
- Born: 14 July 1974 (age 52) Doora, County Clare, Ireland
- Occupation: Garda Síochána
- Height: 6 ft 3 in (191 cm)

Sport
- Sport: Hurling
- Position: Midfield
Club
- Years: Club
- St Joseph's Doora-Barefield
Club titles
- Clare titles: 3
- Munster titles: 2
- All-Ireland Titles: 1
Inter-county
Years	County	Apps (scores)
1995–2004	Clare	33 (1–18)
Inter-county titles
- Munster titles: 3
- All-Irelands: 2
- NHL: 0
- All Stars: 2

Oliver Baker (born 14 July 1974) is an Irish former hurler who played as a midfielder for the Clare senior hurling team.

Baker made his first appearance for the team during the 1994–95 National League and became a regular member of the starting fifteen over the next decade. During that time he won two All-Ireland winners' medals, three Munster Senior Hurling Championship winner's medals and three All-Star awards. He ended up as an All-Ireland runner-up on one occasion.

At club level Baker is an All-Ireland medalist with St Joseph's Doora-Barefield. He also won two Munster winners' medals and three county club championship winners' medals.

In retirement from playing Baker became involved in team management. He served as a selector with Clare, Westmeath and Antrim, before taking over as manager of the Offaly senior hurling team for two seasons. He is the current manager of the Kilmacud Crokes club.

== Playing career ==
=== Club ===
Baker played his club hurling with the St Joseph's Doora-Barefield and had much success during a golden age for the club.

At underage levels he won a county minor championship medal in 1990, adding back-to-back county under-21 championship medals in 1993 and 1994. By this stage Baker had also joined the club's top team. He won a county intermediate championship medal in 1993, propelling St Joseph's Doora-Barefield into the senior ranks and towards future success.

After losing two championship deciders to Clarecastle at senior level, Baker won his first county senior championship medal in 1998 following a defeat of Kilmaley. He later added a Munster medal to his collection following a 0–12 to 0–8 defeat of Toomevara. St Joseph's later completed their landmark season with a 2–14 to 0–8 trouncing of Rathnure in the All-Ireland decider, giving Baker an All-Ireland Senior Club Hurling Championship medal.

St Joseph's continued their remarkable run of success in 1999 with Baker winning a second successive county club championship medal. He later won a second Munster winners' medal following 4–9 to 3–8 defeat of Ballygunner. St Joseph's subsequently qualified for the All-Ireland final and the chance to become the second team in history to retain their title. Athenry provided the opposition and defeated Baker's side by 0–16 to 0–12.

After being defeated in their bid for a third consecutive county championship, St Joseph's returned in 2001. A 1–15 to 1–12 defeat of Sixmilebridge gave Baker his third and final county club championship medal.

=== Inter-county ===
Baker first came to prominence on the inter-county scene as a member of the Clare senior team. He made his debut as a substitute in late 1994 in a National Hurling League game against Galway. He subsequently made his championship debut as a substitute before later becoming a regular midfielder for Clare. In his debut season Baker won his first Munster medal following a surprise 1–17 to 0–11 defeat of local rivals Limerick. It was Clare's first provincial success in sixty-three years. Baker's side later qualified for the All-Ireland final and were the underdogs against reigning champions Offaly. Although trailing at half-time, substitute Éamonn Taaffe scored a crucial goal to propel Clare to a 1–13 to 2–8 victory. It was their first championship title in 81 years. As well as collecting an All-Ireland medal, Baker was later honoured with his first All-Star award.

After surrendering their provincial and All-Ireland crowns in 1996, Clare bounced back the following year. A 1–18 to 0–18 defeat of Tipperary gave Baker a second Munster medal in three years. Clare subsequently qualified for the All-Ireland decider. Due to the introduction of the "back-door" system Tipperary provided the opposition in the first all-Munster All-Ireland final. The game itself was one of the best of the decade. Clare were well on top for much of the game, but Liam Cahill and Eugene O'Neill scored twice for Tipp in the last ten minutes. John Leahy missed a goal chance in the last minute while another Tipp point was controversially ruled wide. At the full-time whistle Clare won by a single point – 0–20 to 2–13. It was a second All-Ireland medal for Baker.

Baker won his third and final Munster medal in 1998 following a tense draw and a replay with Waterford. While Clare were installed as the favourites to retain their All-Ireland crown, a series of bizarre events led to one of the most controversial championship summers ever. Clare drew with Offaly in the All-Ireland semi-final, but in the replay Clare were winning by two points when the referee, Jimmy Cooney, blew the whistle with two minutes of normal time left to be played. The Offaly fans were outraged and staged a sit-down protest on the Croke Park pitch. The result was not allowed to stand and Clare were forced to meet Offaly for a third time that year. They lost the second replay. Baker later won a second All-Star award.

After a number of disappointing championship seasons, Clare surprised the hurling world by qualifying for the All-Ireland final again in 2002. Baker's side put up a good fight against Kilkenny, but a combined tally of 2–13 for both Henry Shefflin and D. J. Carey gave 'the Cats' a seven-point victory.

Baker continued to line out with Clare for the next two seasons but called time on his inter-county career following the team's exit from the 2004 championship.

=== Inter-provincial ===
Baker also lined out with Munster in the inter-provincial series of games. He won his sole Railway Cup medal in 1996 when the southerners trounced Leinster by 2–20 to 0–10.

== Managerial career ==
=== Selector ===
In late 2005 Baker was appointed as a selector to the Westmeath senior hurling team. The appointment was short-lived as work commitments resulted in him having to step down.

Baker joined Anthony Daly's management team as a selector with Clare in early 2006. The subsequent league and championship campaigns saw cause for optimism among Clare supporters. After topping Division 1A of the league, Clare were later defeated by eventual runners-up Clare in the semi-final. After an opening round defeat by Cork in the subsequent championship, Clare qualified for the All-Ireland semi-final. An eight-point win by Kilkenny was the result on that occasion. The Clare management team resigned following this defeat.

In 2007 Mike McNamara was appointed Clare manager and Baker returned as a selector. In spite of a Munster final appearance in 2008, the management team came under pressure the following year with McNamara eventually resigning.

Baker joined up with the Antrim senior hurling team as a selector in 2011. The championship campaign saw Antrim secure their first-ever Leinster championship victory.

=== Offaly manager ===
On 10 October 2011 it was announced that Baker was to succeed Joe Dooley as manager of the Offaly senior hurling team. His first season in charge saw the Faithful county make little progress in Division 1B of the National League. In the subsequent championship Baker's side beat old rivals Wexford before being defeated by Galway and Cork. On 30 August 2013, it was confirmed that Baker had resigned as Offaly manager after two years in charge and would not be seeking a third year.

=== Club manager ===
On 3 December 2013 Baker was appointed manager of the Kilmacud Crokes senior hurling team.

He was managing The Harps in Laois in 2022.

== Family ==
Baker's sons Senan and Tadhg are Leinster Senior Football Championship winners with Westmeath

Sporting positions
Preceded by Joe Dooley	Offaly Senior Hurling Manager; 2011–2013	Succeeded by Brian Whelahan
