= Daniel Scahill =

Irish Gaelic footballer

Daniel Scahill is an Irish Gaelic footballer who plays for the Shandonagh club and at senior level for the Westmeath county team. He is a corner-back. He was "pivotal" in Westmeath's run to the 2026 Leinster Senior Football Championship final.

== Career ==
Scahill started for Westmeath against Meath in the 2026 Leinster Senior Football Championship Quarter-Final. He then started against Kildare in the Leinster Semi-Final as Westmeath qualified for a sixth ever Final. He also started the 2026 Leinster Senior Football Championship final.

His father David Scahill, from County Roscommon, twice won the Roscommon Senior Football Championship in 2003 and 2008 while playing for Castlerea St Kevin's.

== Honours ==
- Leinster Senior Football Championship: 2026
- National Football League Division 3 (1): 2024
- O'Byrne Cup: 2026
