= Michael Ennis (Gaelic footballer) =

Irish Gaelic footballer

Personal information
- Born: Mullingar, Ireland

Sport
- Sport: Gaelic football
- Position: Right half back
Club
- Years: Club
- Ballinagore
Club titles
- Westmeath titles: 2
- Leinster titles: 1
Inter-county
- Years: County
- 2001-2013: Westmeath
Inter-county titles
- Leinster titles: 1
- NFL: 3

Michael Ennis is an Irish Gaelic footballer who plays for his local club Ballinagore and for the Westmeath county team. He was part of the team who lined out against Laois in the 2004 Leinster Senior Football Championship Final to claim the county's first ever Leinster trophy.

== Honours ==
Ballinagore

- Leinster Junior Club Football Championship (1): 2005
- Westmeath Intermediate Football Championship (1): 2007
- Westmeath Junior Football Championship (1): 2005

Westmeath

- Leinster Senior Football Championship (1): 2004
- National Football League, Division 2 (3): 2001, 2003, 2008
- All-Ireland Under-21 Football Championship (1): 1999
- Leinster Under-21 Football Championship (2): 1999, 2000

Leinster

- Railway Cup (2): 2005, 2006

Preceded by John Keane	Westmeath Senior Football Captain; 2010-2011	Succeeded by Denis Glennon
