= Donal O'Donoghue (Gaelic footballer) =

Irish Gaelic footballer

Personal information
- Native name: Donal Ó Donnchú (Irish)
- Born: Mullingar, Ireland
- Height: 1.91 m (6 ft 3 in)

Sport
- Sport: Gaelic football
- Position: Full Back
Club
- Years: Club
- Mullingar Shamrocks
Inter-county
- Years: County
- 2003-: Westmeath
Inter-county titles
- Leinster titles: 1
- NFL: 1

Donal O'Donoghue is a Gaelic footballer who plays for his local club Mullingar Shamrocks and the Westmeath county team. O'Donoghue joined the panel in 2003 which proved to be less successful as O'Donoghue and his team's neighbours Meath knocked them out of the Leinster Championship before exiting in the qualifiers to Monaghan. The year after proved to be a shock as he won his first Leinster medal under Kerryman Páidí Ó Sé only to be denied in the quarter-final by Derry.

2017 season

O'Donoghue decided to give his club, Mullingar Shamrocks, one final season. Many people in and around Mullingar questioned this decision given he had not been a regular starter for Shamrocks since 2014.
