= Jamie Gonoud =

Westmeath Gaelic footballer

Personal information
- Born: 1993 (age 32–33) Tyrrellspass, Westmeath

Sport
- Sport: Gaelic football
- Position: Corner-back
Club
- Years: Club
- Tyrrellspass
College
- Years: College
- Maynooth
Inter-county
- Years: County
- 2013-2025: Westmeath

Jamie Gonoud (born 1992/1993) is a Gaelic footballer who plays for Tyrrellspass and played at senior level for the Westmeath county team. He was appointed the Westmeath under-20 county team manager in September 2026

== Playing career ==
Gonoud made his first championship appearance with Westmeath in 2013 but was not a consistent player until 2016, when he played in the final of 2016 Leinster Senior Football Championship.

He made a late appearance as a sub in the 2015 Leinster Senior Football Championship final.

He played the entirety of the 2016 Leinster Senior Football Championship final.

He received a black card against Laois in the 2021 Leinster Senior Football Championship. Kildare defeated Westmeath in the 2022 Leinster Senior Football Championship but Gonoud scored a goal and was named on the team of the week, the only Westmeath player included.

Gonoud was part of the Westmeath side that won the 2022 Tailteann Cup, playing in the final.

He played in the 2024 NFL Division 3 final as Westmeath claimed the title.

At college level, he was captain of Maynooth in the Sigerson Cup.

Gonoud played as a corner-back.

== Managerial Career ==
He joined Mark McHugh's backroom team as a selector in 2025, effectively retiring from inter-county football to do so.

Following a meeting of the Westmeath GAA County Committee on 4 September 2026, Gonoud was ratified as the Under—20 County Manager

== Personal life ==
He married Chloe Kelly on 6 December 2024.

Gonoud teaches at St. Mary’s Secondary School in Edenderry, making him a colleague of Emmett McDonnell, the Assistant Manager of the WestMeath Senior Football Team under Mark McHugh, who is principal of the school.

== Honours ==
Westmeath

- Tailteann Cup (1): 2022

National football league (3):2017/2019/2024 O'Byrne Cup (1):2019
