= Tadhg Baker =

Irish Gaelic footballer

Tadhg Baker is an Irish Gaelic footballer who plays for the Caulry club and at senior level for the Westmeath county team.

== Early life ==
Baker's father Ollie was an inter-county hurler. His mother is Michelle. He is the younger brother of Senan, who has also played for Westmeath. He also has another, younger, brother and a sister. The family moved to near Baylin. Baker attended Marist College, Athlone, and Dublin City University.

== Playing career ==
Baker captained the Westmeath under-20 team. He was involved with the senior team in the 2025 Tailteann Cup.

Baker played against Meath in the 2026 Leinster Senior Football Championship Quarter-Final. He scored a point against Kildare in the Leinster Semi-Final as Westmeath qualified for a sixth ever Final. He played in the 2026 Leinster Senior Football Championship final. He had to be substituted in extra-time.

== Honours ==
- Leinster Senior Football Championship: 2026
- O'Byrne Cup: 2026
