= Senan Baker =

Irish Gaelic footballer

Senan Baker is an Irish Gaelic footballer who plays for the Caulry club and at senior level for the Westmeath county team.

== Early life ==
Baker's father Ollie was an inter-county hurler. His mother is Michelle. He is the older brother of Tadhg, who has also played for Westmeath. He also has another, younger, brother and a sister. The family moved to near Baylin.

== Playing career ==
He made a substitute appearance in the 2024 NFL Division 3 final as Westmeath claimed the title.

Baker scored a free in the 2026 O'Byrne Cup final victory. He started against Kildare in the Leinster Semi-Final, and scored two points as Westmeath qualified for a sixth ever Final. He scored four points from the bench in the 2026 Leinster Senior Football Championship final, and also set up another point and was described as "calm and clinical" on the pitch.

== Honours ==
- National Football League Division 3 (1): 2024
- Leinster Senior Football Championship: 2026
- O'Byrne Cup: 2026
