= Fergal Wilson =

Westmeath Gaelic footballer

Personal information
- Born: 1979 (age 46–47) Athlone, Ireland

Sport
- Sport: Gaelic football
- Position: Left half forward
Club
- Years: Club
- Tubberclair
Inter-county
- Years: County
- 1999-2011: Westmeath
Inter-county titles
- Leinster titles: 1
- NFL: 3

Fergal Wilson (born 1979) is an Irish sportsperson. He played Gaelic football for the Tubberclair club and was a member of the senior Westmeath county team from 1999 to 2011.

He is among his county's highest championship scorers.

== Honours ==
Westmeath

- Leinster Senior Football Championship (1): 2004
- National Football League, Division 2 (3): 2001, 2003, 2008
- All-Ireland Under-21 Football Championship (1): 1999
- Leinster Under-21 Football Championship (2): 1999, 2000
