= Matthew Whittaker =

Irish Gaelic footballer

Matthew Whittaker is an Irish Gaelic footballer who plays for the Tubberclair club and at senior level for the Westmeath county team. His usual position is as a versatile wing back.

== Playing career ==
Whittaker made a substitute appearance in the 2024 NFL Division 3 final as Westmeath claimed the title.

Whittaker scored Westmeath's opening goal against Meath in the 2026 Leinster Senior Football Championship Quarter-Final. He was also responding to criticism by Pat Spillane. He played against Kildare in the Leinster Semi-Final as Westmeath qualified for a sixth ever Final. He played in the 2026 Leinster Senior Football Championship final, and scored four points including a two-pointer and Westmeath's first point of the game in the opening minute. He was carrying an ankle injury at the time.

== Personal life ==
Whittaker is a cousin of former Westmeath player Gary Connaughton.

== Honours ==
- National Football League Division 3 (1): 2024
- Leinster Senior Football Championship: 2026
- O'Byrne Cup: 2026
