= Brandon Kelly =

Irish Gaelic footballer

Brandon Kelly is an Irish Gaelic footballer who plays for the Milltownpass club and at senior level for the Westmeath county team. He is a corner-forward.

== Career ==
Kelly scored two points for Westmeath against Meath in the 2026 Leinster Senior Football Championship Quarter-Final. He scored the match-winning goal against Kildare in extra-time of the Leinster Semi-Final as Westmeath qualified for a sixth ever Final. He then scored four points in the 2026 Leinster Senior Football Championship final.

== Honours ==
- Leinster Senior Football Championship: 2026
- O'Byrne Cup: 2026
