= Gary Connaughton =

Irish Gaelic footballer

Personal information
- Born: Athlone, Ireland
- Height: 1.93 m (6 ft 4 in)

Sport
- Sport: Gaelic Football
- Position: Goalkeeper
Club
- Years: Club
- Tubberclair
Inter-county
- Years: County
- 2003-2013 2015-: Westmeath
Inter-county titles
- Leinster titles: 1
- NFL: 2
- All Stars: 1

Gary Connaughton is a Gaelic footballer who played for the Westmeath county team. With a large frame and strong kickouts he has been often described as one of Westmeath's greatest Gaelic players. He was nominated three times for an All Stars Award and was awarded an All Stars Award for performances in 2008. He has worked in his family's company, Connaughton Sand & Gravel, whilst playing Gaelic, before returning to third level education, a Bdegree in Business at Athlone Institute of Technology, His club team is Tubberclair GAA Club in which he also plays as goalkeeper.

He also played League of Ireland soccer with Athlone Town for several seasons. He has also represented Ireland at underage soccer winning a European Under 19 Championship medal in 1998 under the guidance of manager Brian Kerr, where he was second to first choice keeper Alex O'Reilly of West Ham United, He played one match in the tournament against France, In that same year he received a trial with Newcastle United.

He announced his retirement from inter-county football after 10 years on 1 July 2013 after Westmeath's first round qualifier defeat to Fermanagh.

His cousin Matthew Whittaker was part of the team that won Westmeath's second ever Leinster title in 2026.
