= Ray Connellan =

Personal information
- Native name: Réamonn Ó Coinnialláin (Irish)
- Born: Athlone, Ireland
- Occupation: Student
- Height: 1.91 m (6 ft 3 in)

Sport
- Sport: Gaelic football
- Position: Midfield
Club
- Years: Club
- Athlone
Inter-county
Years	County	Apps (scores)
2014–	Westmeath	1 (0-0)
- Leinster titles: 1

Ray Connellan

Personal information
- Full name: Réamonn Ó Coinnialláin
- Born: 29 June 1994 (age 32); Athlone, Ireland

Playing career^{1}
Years	Club	Games (Goals)
2017–2018	St Kilda	0 (0)
- ^{1} Playing statistics correct to the end of 2018.

Ray Connellan (born 29 June 1994) is a Gaelic footballer who plays for the Athlone club and at senior level for the Westmeath county team. He is also a former Australian rules footballer with the St Kilda Football Club in the Australian Football League.

== Playing career ==
Connellan made his senior championship debut for Westmeath in 2014.

He played in the 2015 Leinster Senior Football Championship final.

He played in the 2016 Leinster Senior Football Championship final.

Later that month (July 2016), he signed with Australian rules football club, St Kilda, as a category B rookie.

Connellan then resumed playing Gaelic football.

He played for Westmeath in the 2022 Tailteann Cup final.

He played in the 2024 NFL Division 3 final as Westmeath claimed the title.

He played for Westmeath in the 2026 O'Byrne Cup final. Then he played in the 2026 Leinster Senior Football Championship final, only a second ever title win for Westmeath. He was Man of the Match winner. Then he was named as GAA.ie Footballer of the Week.

As a result of involvement in the two earlier Leinster finals, Connellan became the first Westmeath player to contest three different Leinster finals.

== Personal life ==
He is from Coosan. His father is Paul Connellan. His mother is Mary. His brother John has also played for Westmeath. His partner is Lucy Slevin.

== Honours ==
Westmeath

- Tailteann Cup (1): 2022
- National Football League Division 3 (1): 2024
- Leinster Senior Football Championship (1): 2026
- O'Byrne Cup (1): 2026
