= Luke Dempsey =

Gaelic football manager

Luke Dempsey (born 1959) is a Gaelic football manager. His managerial career began in 1994. He has managed three county teams: Westmeath, Longford and Carlow, as well as several clubs in Kildare, Westmeath and Meath.

== Career ==
Dempsey guided Westmeath to an All-Ireland Minor Football Championship title in 1995 and to an All-Ireland Under-21 Football Championship title in 1999, then in his first season as senior manager led the team to an All-Ireland Senior Football Championship quarter-final. He left Westmeath at the end of August 2003.

From 1995 until 2017, Dempsey's managerial roles were with: the Westmeath minor team (1995/1996), the Westmeath under-21 team (1997/1998/1999/2000), the Westmeath senior team (2001/2002/2003), the Carlow senior team (2004, on an interim basis), the Longford senior team (2005/2006/2007/2008), the Carlow senior team (2009/2010/2011/2012), Kildare GAA club Moorefield (2013/2014) and Westmeath GAA club St Loman's (2015/2016/2017).

He was appointed Longford manager in September 2004 and remained in that role until resigning in July 2008.

Dempsey led Moorefield to the 2014 Kildare Senior Football Championship, then returned to Westmeath as manager of the St Loman's club. His managerial record also includes leading the St Loman's club to the retention of a Westmeath Senior Football Championship title for the first time in its history, this achieved in 2016. He led St Loman's to a Leinster Senior Club Football Championship final against his former club Moorefield in 2017. He was appointed manager of Meath GAA club Gaeil Colmcille in 2021. He left after one season and was appointed manager of Longford GAA club Killoe Young Emmets in November 2022.

== Personal life ==
Dempsey is originally from County Kildare, a native of Johnstownbridge. He lived in County Carlow from the age of ten. However, he later moved to live in Westmeath after securing a job there in 1981, teaching mathematics at St Joseph's SC in Rochfortbridge. After setting out teaching there in 1981 as a 21-year-old, he managed St Joseph's Rochfortbridge to a Leinster Colleges Senior Football Championship title in 2020, a year before retiring.

Sporting positions
Preceded by Brendan Lowry	Westmeath Senior Football Manager; 2000–2003	Succeeded by Páidí Ó Sé
