= Jason Daly =

Westmeath Gaelic football goalkeeper

Personal information
- Nickname: Magpie

Sport
- Sport: Gaelic football
- Position: Goalkeeper
Club
- Years: Club
- St Loman's
Inter-county
- Years: County
- Westmeath
- Leinster titles: 1

Jason Daly is a Gaelic footballer who plays for St Loman's and at senior level for the Westmeath county team. He plays as a goalkeeper for both.

== Playing career ==
Daly made his full championship debut against Dublin in 2020. He is the goalkeeper who won the 2022 Tailteann Cup.

Jason got the nickname "Magpie" due to his magpie-ish tendencies.

He was the goalkeeper in the 2024 NFL Division 3 final as Westmeath claimed the title.

He was the goalkeeper for the final when Westmeath won only a second ever Leinster Senior Football Championship title in 2026. He had come in as a sub for the injured Conor McCormack against Meath in the 2026 Leinster Senior Football Championship Quarter-Final. He then started against Kildare in the Leinster Semi-Final as Westmeath qualified for a sixth ever Final.

== Honours ==
Westmeath

- Tailteann Cup (1): 2022
- National Football League Division 3 (1): 2024
- Leinster Senior Football Championship (1): 2026
