= Brían Cooney =

Irish Gaelic footballer

Brían Cooney is an Irish Gaelic footballer who plays for the Coralstown–Kinnegad club and at senior level for the Westmeath county team. A midfielder, he is the son of Jack Cooney.

== Career ==
He scored a hat-trick against Longford in 2024 when he was the captain. He scored a point against Meath in the 2026 Leinster Senior Football Championship Quarter-Final. He scored a goal against Kildare in the Leinster Semi-Final as Westmeath qualified for a sixth ever Final. He played in the 2026 Leinster Senior Football Championship final, and attempted a two-pointer only for the ball to sail over Dublin goalkeeper Evan Comerford and into the net for a goal and three points. His was the first goal that Westmeath had scored in a Leinster Senior Final for 95 years. Westmeath won, defeating the favourites.

== Honours ==
- Leinster Senior Football Championship: 2026
- O'Byrne Cup: 2026
