= Rory O'Connell =

Irish Gaelic footballer

Personal information
- Native name: Ruairí Ó Conaill (Irish)
- Born: Athlone, Ireland
- Height: 1.93 m (6 ft 4 in)

Sport
- Sport: Gaelic football
- Position: Midfield
Club
- Years: Club
- Athlone
Inter-county
Years	County	Apps (scores)
1994-2006	Westmeath	142 (0-25)
Inter-county titles
- Leinster titles: 1
- NFL: 2
- All Stars: 1

Rory O'Connell is a former Gaelic footballer from Athlone, County Westmeath. He was Westmeath's first Football All Stars winner in 2001. He was also part of the Westmeath team that won the county's first Leinster Senior Football Championship in 2004. He played his club football for Athlone.

== Honours ==
- Leinster Senior Football Championship (1): 2004
- National Football League, Division 2 (2): 2001, 2003
- Railway Cup (2): 2001, 2002
- GAA GPA All Stars Awards (1): 2001
