= John Heslin =

Westmeath Gaelic footballer

Personal information
- Native name: Seán Ó hEislin (Irish)
- Born: 27 June 1992 (age 34) Mullingar, Ireland
- Occupation: Ruminant Product Manager
- Height: 1.91 m (6 ft 3 in)

Sport
- Sport: Gaelic football
- Position: Full Forward
Club
- Years: Club
- St Loman's
Club titles
- Westmeath titles: 4
College
- Years: College
- UCD
College titles
- Sigerson titles: 1
Inter-county*
| Years | County | Apps (scores) |
| 2011–2025 2026 | Westmeath; Westmeath | 38 (4–168); 4 (0–12) |
Inter-county titles
- Leinster titles: 1
- All-Irelands: 0
- *Inter County team apps and scores correct as of match played 21 Jun 2026.

John Heslin (born 27 June 1992) is a Gaelic footballer who plays for the Westmeath county team and also an Australian rules footballer for the Irish Warriors. Heslin was drafted by Australian Football League club Richmond in 2011, with Pick #90 of the Rookie Draft, but left after just three months, without playing a single game.

== Playing career ==
=== Gaelic football ===
The St Loman's clubman represented University College Dublin in the Sigerson Cup and Westmeath at all levels and starred as Westmeath reached the Leinster Under-21 Football Championship final. He also played in two games of the 2011 All-Ireland Senior Football Championship and went on to become a permanent fixture in the Westmeath team.

Heslin scored 1–9 in the 2015 Leinster Senior Football Championship semi-final victory over Meath, his team winning the game despite having to make up 11 points and not having beaten Meath for a long time. He played in the final, scoring three points.

Heslin played in the 2016 Leinster Senior Football Championship final, scoring six points.

He was a playing member of the team when Westmeath won the 2019 National Football League Division 3 league title by a goal against Laois at Croke Park.

In the 2022 Tailteann Cup final he overtook Dessie Dolan as Westmeath's all-time championship top scorer.

He made a late substitute appearance in the 2024 NFL Division 3 final as Westmeath claimed the title.

He retired from inter-county football in January 2025.

He made a return in 2026, following the injury to Luke Loughlin, and scored a two-pointer and a free in the 2026 Leinster Senior Football Championship final, only a second ever title win for Westmeath and Heslin's first in his first game back since his initial retirement. He had been working as an analyst with GAA+. He surpassed the expectations of manager Mark McHugh, who did not expect Heslin to be ready to play until the Leinster Championship was finished.

=== Australian football ===
Heslin represented the Ireland national Australian rules football team, that won the 2011 Australian Football International Cup and kicked four goals in the tournament.

=== Richmond Football Club ===
Heslin joined the Tigers as a rookie in the 2012 Pre-season Draft. After only three months on the Tigers' rookie list, homesickness proved too much for the St Loman's clubman, and he resumed his inter-county career with Westmeath.

== Career statistics ==
As of match played 15 June 2024

| Team | Year | National League | | | Leinster | | All-Ireland | | Total | |
| Team | Year | Division | Apps | Score | Apps | Score | Apps | Score | Apps | Score |
|---|---|---|---|---|---|---|---|---|---|---|
| Westmeath | 2011 | Division 3 | | | 1 | 0-01 | 1 | 0-04 | | |
| Westmeath | 2012 | Division 2 | | | 1 | 0-05 | 2 | 0-09 | | |
| Westmeath | 2013 | Division 2 | 7 | 2-32 | 2 | 0-10 | 1 | 1-05 | | |
| Westmeath | 2014 | Division 1 | 4 | 0-21 | 1 | 0-03 | 1 | 0-04 | | |
| Westmeath | 2015 | Division 2 | 7 | 0-32 | 4 | 1-26 | — | | | |
| Westmeath | 2016 | Division 3 | 7 | 1-31 | 3 | 0-15 | 1 | 0-10 | | |
| Westmeath | 2017 | Division 4 | 8 | 3-60 | 3 | 1-14 | 1 | 0-06 | | |
| Westmeath | 2018 | Division 3 | 6 | 1-36 | 1 | 0-00 | — | | | |
| Westmeath | 2019 | Division 3 | | | 1 | 0-01 | 2 | 0-01 | | |
| Westmeath | 2020 | Division 2 | 7 | 1-22 | 1 | 0-03 | — | | | |
| Westmeath | 2021 | Division 2 | | | 2 | 0-13 | — | | | |
| Westmeath | 2022 | Division 3 | | | 2 | 1-09 | — | | | |
| Westmeath | 2023 | Division 3 | 6 | 3-32 | 1 | 0-03 | 3 | 0-16 | | |
| Westmeath | 2024 | Division 3 | | | 1 | 0-02 | 2 | 0-08 | | |
| Career total | | | | | 24 | 3-105 | 14 | 1-63 | 35 | 4-158 |

== Honours ==
Westmeath

- Tailteann Cup (1): 2022
- Leinster Senior Football Championship (1): 2026
- National Football League Division 3 (2): 2019, 2024

Individual

- Tailteann Cup Team of the Year (1): 2022
