= Baylin =

Village in County Westmeath, Ireland, about 5 km east of Athlone

Baylin Béal Linne
- Village
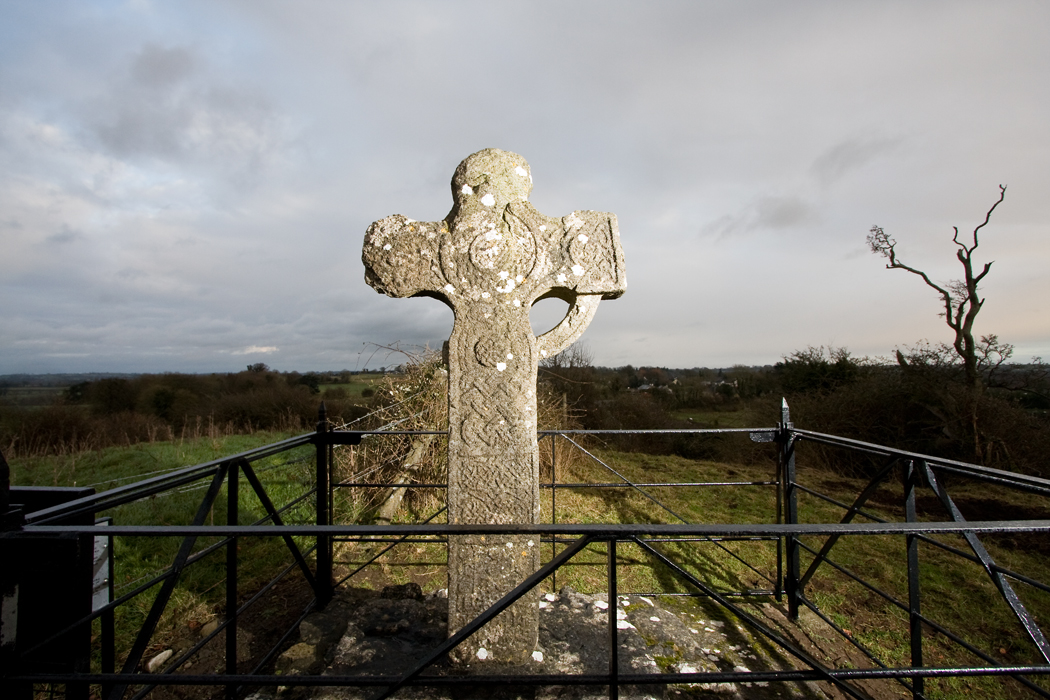
- Bealin High Cross

- Location in Ireland
- Coordinates: 53.4337°N 7.8419°W
- Country: Ireland
- Province: Leinster
- County: County Westmeath
- Dáil Éireann: Longford–Westmeath

Population (2022)
  - Total: 284
- Eircode routing key: N37
- Irish Grid Reference: N104426

Baylin (/beɪlɪn/; Irish: Béal Linne), also written Bealin is a village in County Westmeath, Ireland, about 5 kilometres (3.1 mi) east of Athlone.

== Name ==
The village’s Irish name is Béal Linne. The Placenames Database of Ireland records the English forms Bealin and Baylin alongside the Irish name.

== Geography and administration ==
Baylin is in the historical barony of Clonlonan and the civil parish of Ballyloughloe. The surrounding rural area includes the townland and demesne of Twyford, historically associated with the Twyford estate and house.

== History ==
An early ecclesiastical site known as Íseal Chiaráin is associated with the Twyford area; the Office of Public Works notes that no surface remains of this ecclesiastical site are now visible.

The nearby Twyford estate developed as a country demesne from the 18th century, with Twyford House described in estate records as built around 1760 for the Handcock family (later connected to the Hodson family).

== Archaeology and built heritage ==
=== Bealin High Cross ===
The medieval high cross associated with Baylin is known as the Bealin High Cross (also called the Twyford Cross). It stands on a hill in Twyford demesne and is described by the Office of Public Works as having been removed from the old graveyard of the ecclesiastical site Íseal Chiaráin in the 18th century by Reverend Richard Handcock.

The cross is a designated National Monument (Bealin Cross) and is recorded as National Monument number 223 (SMR WM029-008---).

According to Heritage Ireland, the cross is approximately 2.1 metres high from its base and features decorative carving including animal imagery and geometric interlace.

== Demographics ==
The population of Baylin was recorded as 240 in the 2016 census and 284 in the 2022 census.

== Education ==
Baylin is served by a primary school, St Ciaran’s National School (roll number 17708P).

== See also ==
- Athlone
- Mount Temple, County Westmeath
- Bealin High Cross
