= GAA+ =

Irish Gaelic games streaming service

- Country: Ireland
- Broadcast area: Worldwide

Ownership
- Owner: Gaelic Athletic Association; RTÉ (until 2025)
- Sister channels: Watch LOI

History
- Launched: 2014 (GAAGO); 2025 (GAA+)

Links
- Website: gaaplus.ie

GAA+ is an Irish IPTV service owned and operated by the Gaelic Athletic Association. It is a subscription-based sports channel aimed at an international market and at the Irish diaspora around the world. It features live and on demand Gaelic games over the year, a library of award-winning GAA documentaries as well as an archive of classic games from year to year. Launched as GAAGO in 2014, it was jointly owned by RTÉ and the GAA until its rebranding to GAA+ in 2025.

== History ==
=== GAAGO ===
GAAGO logo

In 2014, the GAA announced that it was to set up a new IPTV service for an international market as part of their broadcast rights deal. The service was co-owned by RTÉ and was run by RTÉ Digital.

In 2020 GAAGO launched a similar streaming services for Irish Soccer called Watch LOI as the service provider for the Football Association of Ireland.

After the GAA's broadcasting contract with Sky Sports expired in October 2022 and they did not seek contracts with producers on free-to-air channels such as Virgin Media Sport, it became the only place to watch certain games of the 2023 Munster Senior Hurling Championship. This was criticised by some including Tánaiste Micheál Martin.

After suspicion the service was operating beyond its clearance given by the Competition and Consumer Protection Commission in 2017, the commission opened an inquiry in May 2023 into the service's adherence to competition law. RTÉ told the Irish Examiner that they believed that "CCPC approval was not needed".

On 12 July 2023, senior GAA officials appeared before the Oireachtas Sport and Media Committee to defend the controversial GAAGO coverage of All-Ireland championships, saying broadcasting every championship match on TV was "not realistic" and not in the GAA's "interest".

=== GAA+ ===
It was reported in December 2024 that the GAA were considering purchasing RTÉ's share of GAAGO. In February 2025, the GAA completed their takeover of the streaming platform, rebranding as GAA+.

On 31 March 2025, GAA+ was launched, with forty live matches to be exclusively shown for the 2025 season.

== Programming ==
GAA

- (Republic of Ireland) GAA Championship coverage

== Presenters, pundits and commentators ==
The 2023 championship season was presented by Gráinne McElwain, alongside pundits Michael Murphy, Marc Ó Sé, Paddy Andrews, Séamus Hickey, Tommy Walsh, John O'Dwyer, and Eoin Cadogan, while match commentary was provided by Dave McIntyre and Mike Finnerty.

The 2025 championship season, which saw the rebranding of GAAGO to GAA+, was presented by McElwain and Aisling O'Reilly, alongside pundits from both the 2023–24 seasons and new additions Aaron Kernan, Michael Meehan, Bríd Stack, John Heslin, Richie Hogan and Noel Connors, while match commentary was provided by McIntyre, Finnerty and Liam Aherne. Heslin stopped working as an analyst in 2026 when he returned to play for Westmeath in the 2026 Leinster Senior Football Championship final.
