= Sam McCartan =

Westmeath Gaelic footballer

Personal information
- Born: 1999/2000

Sport
- Sport: Gaelic football
Club
- Years: Club
- St Loman's
Inter-county
- Years: County
- Westmeath
- Leinster titles: 1

Sam McCartan (born 1999/2000) is a Gaelic footballer who plays for the St Loman's club and at senior level for Westmeath county team. He is a grandson of Seán Purcell and is related to Ciarán Kilkenny. His younger brother Danny has also played for Westmeath.

== Playing career ==
McCartan scored a goal against Laois in the 2022 Tailteann Cup. He passed the ball to Lorcan O'Toole for a second goal in the semi-final that got them past Offaly and into the competition's inaugural final.

He was Man of the Match in the 2024 NFL Division 3 final as Westmeath claimed the title.

McCartan played when Westmeath won only a second ever Leinster Senior Football Championship title in 2026, scoring two points in the 2026 Leinster Senior Football Championship final.

== Honours ==
Westmeath

- Tailteann Cup (1): 2022
- National Football League Division 3 (1): 2024
- Leinster Senior Football Championship (1): 2026

Individual

- Tailteann Cup Team of the Year (1): 2022
