= Evan Comerford (Dublin Gaelic footballer) =

Irish Gaelic footballer

Personal information
- Native name: Evan Mac Cumascaigh (Irish)
- Born: 1998 (age 27–28) Dublin, Ireland
- Height: 1.83 m (6 ft 0 in)

Sport
- Sport: Gaelic football
- Position: Goalkeeper
Club
- Years: Club
- Ballymun Kickhams
Inter-county
- Years: County
- 2017–present: Dublin
Inter-county titles
- Leinster titles: 4
- All-Irelands: 3
- NFL: 2

Evan Comerford (born 1998) is a Gaelic footballer who plays for the Ballymun Kickhams club and at senior level for the Dublin county team.

He has a namesake County Tipperary footballer, Evan Comerford, with whom he has sometimes been confused.

A goal, scored by Brían Cooney against Comerford in the 2026 Leinster Senior Football Championship final, was the first goal scored by Westmeath in a Leinster senior final for 95 years.
