= Kevin Feely =

Irish Gaelic football player and former soccer player

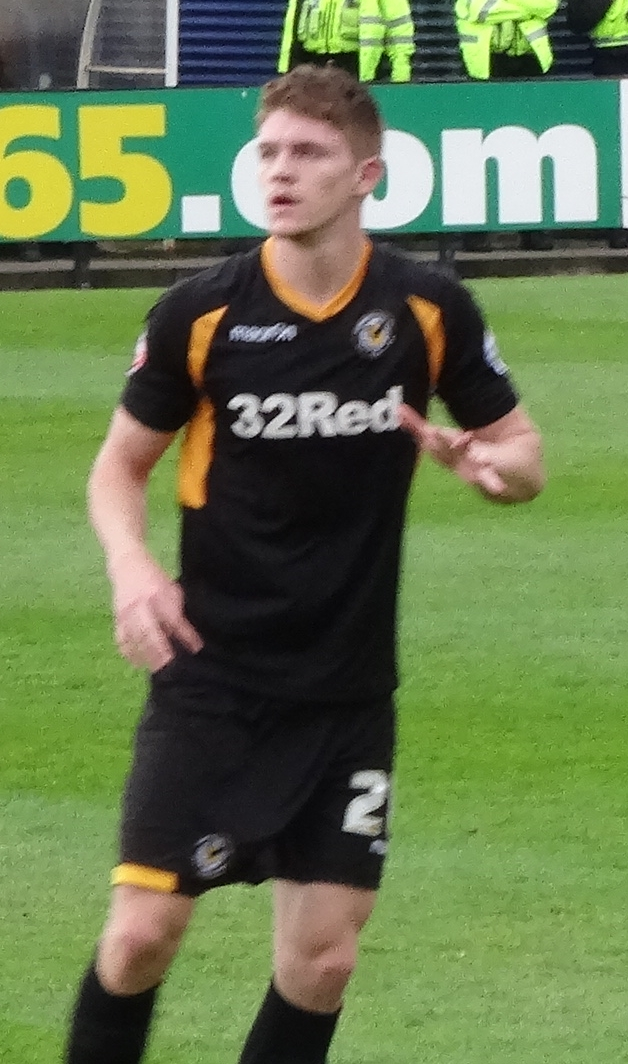
- Feely playing for Newport County in 2014

Personal information
- Full name: Kevin Roderick Feely
- Date of birth: 30 August 1992 (age 34)
- Place of birth: Brussels, Belgium
- Position: Defender

Youth career
- Belvedere

Senior career*
Years	Team	Apps	(Gls)
2010–2012	Bohemians	28	(1)
2012–2014	Charlton Athletic	0	(0)
2013	→ Carlisle United (loan)	2	(0)
2013	→ AFC Wimbledon (loan)	0	(0)
2014	→ Newport County (loan)	10	(1)
2014–2015	Newport County	25	(0)
Total		63	(3)

International career
2014	Republic of Ireland U21	1	(0)
- * Club domestic league appearances and goals

Kevin Roderick Feely (born 30 August 1992) is an Irish former professional footballer and Gaelic footballer for Kildare and Athy. His younger brother Rory Feely is a professional footballer.

== Career ==
Feely began his career with Bohemianss in 2010, signed by Pat Fenlon, however it was under Aaron Callaghan that he became a regular first-team member in 2012. His performances attracted the attention of a number of overseas clubs, with both Peterborough United and Everton amongst his rumoured suitors. However, Feely signed for Charlton Athletic in November 2012. On 8 August 2013 he joined Carlisle United on a 28-day loan. Feely made his professional debut on 10 August 2013 in a 4–0 defeat at Bradford City.

On 25 November 2013 Feely joined AFC Wimbledon on loan until 4 January. On 21 March 2014 he joined Newport County on loan. He made his debut for Newport in the league two match versus Torquay United on 22 March. Feely scored his first football league goal for Newport versus Rochdale on 3 May 2014.

On 22 May 2014, he was released from Charlton Athletic, and on 30 May 2014 signed a permanent contract with Newport County. On 1 September 2015 his Newport contract was cancelled by mutual consent so that Feely could return to full-time education.

Feely now plays senior Gaelic football for Athy and the Kildare county team.

On 25 October 2017, Feely was named in the Ireland squad for the 2017 International Rules Series against Australia in November.
