= Ronan Wallace =

Westmeath Gaelic footballer

Personal information
- Nickname: Wally
- Born: 1995/1996

Sport
- Sport: Gaelic football
Club
- Years: Club
- Multyfarnham
Inter-county
- Years: County
- Westmeath
- Leinster titles: 1

Ronan Wallace (born 1995/1996) is a Gaelic footballer who plays for the Multyfarnham club and at senior level for the Westmeath county team.

== Playing career ==
He was a member of the team that defeated Dublin at Parnell Park in the 2019 O'Byrne Cup final, his county's first time to win that trophy since 1988. He won his second piece of silverware of 2019 when Westmeath won the 2019 National Football League Division 3 league title by a goal against Laois at Croke Park, Wallace scored 0–1.

He scored the first goal against Offaly in the 2022 Tailteann Cup semi-final, which Westmeath won to qualify for the competition's inaugural final. Then he got the insurance score in that one to down Cavan.

Wallace was appointed Westmeath captain in 2025 following the retirement of Kevin Maguire.

Wallace captained and inspired Westmeath to the 2026 O'Byrne Cup. Then he captained Westmeath to only a second ever Leinster Senior Football Championship title in 2026. His walk up the steps of the Hogan Stand to lift the Delaney Cup was instantly declared an iconic moment in the sports history of Westmeath.

== Honours ==
Westmeath

- Tailteann Cup (1): 2022
- Leinster Senior Football Championship (1): 2026
- National Football League Division 3 (1): 2019
- O'Byrne Cup (2): 2019, 2026

Individual

- Tailteann Cup Team of the Year (1): 2022
- PwC GAA Football All-Star (1): 2026

Sporting positions
Preceded by Kevin Maguire	Westmeath Senior Football Captain; 2025–	Succeeded by Incumbent
