= Mark McHugh =

Donegal Gaelic footballer

Personal information
- Native name: Marc Mac Aodh (Irish)
- Born: 22 August 1990 (age 36) Letterkenny, Ireland
- Occupation: Business Development Manager at Print Supplies
- Height: 1.78 m (5 ft 10 in)

Sport
- Sport: Gaelic football
- Position: Right half forward
Club
- Years: Club
- 2007–: Cill Chartha
Club titles
- Donegal titles: 1
Inter-county
- Years: County
- 2009–2018: Donegal
Inter-county titles
- Ulster titles: 3
- All-Irelands: 1
- NFL: 0
- All Stars: 1
Inter-county management
- Years: Team
- 2025–: Westmeath
Inter-county titles as manager
County	League	Province	All-Ireland
Westmeath		1	

Mark McHugh (born 22 August 1990) is an Irish Gaelic footballer, coach and manager. He has been manager of the senior Westmeath county team since 2025.

McHugh played for Cill Chartha and the Donegal county team. He has won one All-Ireland Senior Football Championship title (2012) and three Ulster Senior Football Championship titles (2011, 2012 and 2018) as a player. As a manager, he has won one Leinster Senior Football Championship. He is the brother of Ryan and the son of Martin.

== Early life and family ==
McHugh is the son of Patrice and the brother of Rachel. He is also the son of Martin, the BBC television analyst and All-Ireland SFC winner in 1992. He was born the Wednesday after his father's Donegal side was defeated by Meath in the semi-final of the 1990 All-Ireland SFC.

Mark McHugh's brother, Ryan, also plays for the Donegal team, though he was playing for the county minors when Mark won the 2012 All-Ireland SFC. In 2016, the year he won his first award, Ryan joined Mark, and their father Martin, as an All Star winner.

Mark's uncle, James, also played in the 1992 All-Ireland SFC final and received an All Star in 1992. James's son, Eoin, also played for Donegal up to, and including, senior level.

Mark McHugh's dog Miley was photographed inside the Sam Maguire Cup. Miley is named after J. R. Ewing's dog from the American TV show Dallas.

== Playing career ==
=== Club ===
In his early career, McHugh admitted his club did not have many big games.

He won the 2017 Donegal Senior Football Championship, scoring the opening point in the first minute of the final. It was the first time his club had won the title in 24 years, having been defeated by Glenswilly at the same stage the previous year.

He has also played as a goalkeeper for his club.

=== Inter-county ===
==== Underage ====
McHugh did not play at minor level, what with the Leaving Certificate and a broken collar bone.

He played for Donegal throughout the 2010 Ulster Under-21 Football Championship campaign, a competition which the team won and in the final of which McHugh assisted Dermot Molloy in his team's second goal. He then played in the final of the 2010 All-Ireland Under-21 Football Championship, which Donegal (managed by Jim McGuinness) narrowly lost to Dublin (managed by Jim Gavin), though McHugh scored one point in that match.

==== Senior ====
===== Jim McGuinness: 2010–14 =====
McHugh made his senior championship debut as a substitute against Down in Ballybofey in 2010. Under Jim McGuinness, his former manager at under-21 level, McHugh was part of the team that won the 2011 Ulster Senior Football Championship, and played in the final against Derry.

McHugh returned to the Ulster SFC final in 2012 in his third campaign, winning a second Ulster SFC title and scoring 0–2 against Down in the final. He was man of the match in the Ulster final. He then helped Donegal all the way to the 2012 All-Ireland Senior Football Championship final, in which he played. Donegal won. After that game he said, "The woman I'm going to have to marry is going to have to be very, very good to top this day off for me". McHugh sang his wee heart out at the homecoming when he joined in with Rory Gallagher on "Jimmy's Winning Matches".

McHugh won an All Star and attended the Football Tour of New York.

McHugh missed Donegal's 2013 National Football League campaign with a pelvis injury. He returned for the 2013 Ulster SFC campaign, but was forced off injured early in the final, after a collision with Stephen Gollogly of Monaghan, and was hospitalised as a result. He was ruled out for a month with the multiple injuries Gollogly's rough play gave him, including concussion, a perforated eardrum and a quad muscle injury.

McHugh made a substitute appearance against Monaghan in the 2014 National Football League Division 2 final at Croke Park. Three days later, it was confirmed that McHugh was one of four players to have left the Donegal county panel, less than a month before the county's 2014 Ulster SFC game against Derry. Later he admitted, "I just needed a break. I wasn't enjoying what I was doing and me being there didn't help the mood in the camp. And I thought its [sic] not good for me being here and it's probably not good for other players so I stepped away. Going away was a decision I made and I knew I wouldn't be in the team if I stepped away. I made that decision." He spent his time away from the team in New York. He thus missed out on the 2014 Ulster SFC campaign, which Donegal won. In his absence Donegal also qualified for a second All-Ireland SFC final in three years, with McHugh's brother Ryan helping himself to two goals against Dublin in the semi-final after being left to the bus by Mark, who sat by "and watched as he became a household name in one afternoon". Ahead of the final, McHugh the Elder admitted he was "looking forward to… rebuilding for next year of myself and the club championship, playing well and hopefully with Jim next year or whoever that may be and ask me back into the panel. [sic]"

===== Bonner–McGuinness interim: 2014–17 =====
With Rory Gallagher having succeeded Jim McGuinness as manager of Donegal, McHugh rejoined the county panel ahead of the 2015 season. He started the opening fixture of the 2015 National Football League at home to Derry. He also started the next game against Dublin at Croke Park, the third fixture against Cork in Ballyshannon, the fourth fixture against Monaghan and the fifth fixture against Kerry. He appeared as a substitute for his own brother in the sixth fixture against Tyrone. He also appeared as a substitute in the seventh fixture against Mayo.

Ahead of the 2015 Ulster SFC, McHugh cracked his ribs while playing a game with his club and was also having difficulty with a quad injury which had not properly healed. He made a substitute appearance in the preliminary round against Tyrone, started the quarter-final against Armagh and made a substitute appearance in the semi-final against Derry. He then started the 2015 Ulster SFC final. He also started the 2015 All-Ireland SFC qualifier defeat of Galway at Croke Park, and the next game against Mayo at the same venue.

McHugh was included in the 2016 Dr McKenna Cup squad but was later reported to be training away from the team, with the manager stating: ""At present he is not in the squad… He is working on his own individual strength and conditioning programme under our supervision". He made a substitute appearance against Roscommon in the fifth fixture of the 2016 National Football League. He made further substitute appearances in the sixth and seventh fixtures, against Dublin at Croke Park and Monaghan in Castleblayney respectively.

McHugh made a substitute appearance in the 2016 Ulster SFC final. He had previously made substitute appearances in the quarter-final against Fermanagh, in the semi-final against Monaghan and in the semi-final replay against the same opposition (scoring 0–1 in the latter game). McHugh also made a substitute appearance in the 2016 All-Ireland SFC qualifier defeat of Cork at Croke Park.

McHugh made a substitute appearance in the second fixture of the 2017 National Football League away to Roscommon. He made a substitute appearance for his own cousin in the fourth fixture against Cavan. He made another substitute appearance in the fifth fixture against Tyrone. He made an early substitute appearance in the sixth fixture against Monaghan. He made another substitute appearance in the seventh fixture against Mayo.

McHugh made a substitute appearance in the 2017 Ulster SFC quarter-final against Antrim, and scored 0–1. He made another substitute appearance in the 2017 All-Ireland SFC qualifier defeat of Meath at Páirc Tailteann. He then started the qualifier loss to Galway at Markievicz Park.

===== Declan Bonner: 2017–18 =====
Under the management of Declan Bonner, McHugh made a substitute appearance against Galway in the second fixture of the 2018 National Football League. He started against Dublin in the third game and against Kildare in the fourth game. In the fifth game against Tyrone (another start), McHugh scored a point. A further start followed in the sixth game against Monaghan, and a substitute appearance in the seventh game against Mayo.

McHugh won his third and final Ulster SFC in 2018, appearing as second half substitute in the final against Fermanagh and scoring a point. He had previously made substitute appearances in the preliminary round against Cavan, the quarter-final against Derry and the semi-final against Down, scoring a point in the semi-final. McHugh did not return after the winter. Alongside clubmates Ciaran McGinley and Stephen McBrearty, he opted out the Donegal panel for the 2019 season.

=== Inter-provincial ===
McHugh played for Ulster in the Inter-Provincial Series.

== Style of play ==
McHugh's performances in 2012 earned him repeated descriptions of being "Donegal's pivotal player". At his peak, he was considered "as lively a wire as his father Martin was in his heyday", and has been called the "Lionel Messi" of a Donegal team widely said to resemble FC Barcelona in terms of the quality of their style and shock and awe tactics. Daniel O'Donnell himself has personally thanked McHugh.

== Coaching and managerial career ==
McHugh joined the Fermanagh minor team as their coach for 2020, saying: "I want to get a wee bit of experience in the coaching and they train in Irvinestown which is as close to me as Letterkenny or Convoy". McHugh had earlier wished to be part of a Gary Duffy-led Donegal under-20 management team; however, Shaun Paul Barrett was instead appointed manager.

In October 2022, McHugh was announced as Roscommon senior coach at the same time as Davy Burke was appointed manager. He spent time as Maigh Cuilinn coach, then was named head coach of Westmeath when Dermot McCabe was appointed as manager in 2024. When McCabe left at the end of the 2025 season, McHugh was appointed Westmeath manager.

McHugh began the 2026 season by leading Westmeath to the 2026 O'Byrne Cup. Westmeath then added the 2026 Leinster Senior Football Championship title. According to the Irish Independent, "most observers were convinced it could never have happened without McHugh". Former Westmeath player Kieran Martin told that newspaper: "We got Mark at the right time". That second title of the season meant manager McHugh joined his father Martin in winning the Ulster Senior Football Championship for Donegal as a player and an unexpected provincial title as manager of a different team.

Then, for the first time ever, Westmeath won five championship games in the same season; this was accomplished with an extra-time victory over Cavan on Saturday 30 May. According to former Cavan player Cian Mackey: "Cavan, without a doubt, feel they should be beating Westmeath. They're Division 2. Westmeath are Division 3".

== Personal life ==
McHugh is a father.

On Saturday, 31 December 2022, McHugh married Aisling Gormley, with the ceremony taking place at St Columba's Church in Carrick, the photographs being taken in Towney, and the reception being held at Letterkenny's Clanree Hotel. As of that time, Gormley taught at Niall Mór National School, Killybegs, and she and McHugh had three children (son, daughter, son) together.

== Honours ==
=== Player ===
Donegal

- All-Ireland Senior Football Championship: 2012
- Ulster Senior Football Championship: 2011, 2012, 2018
- All-Ireland Under-21 Football Championship runner-up: 2010
- Ulster Under-21 Football Championship: 2010
- National Football League Division 2: 2011

Cill Chartha

- Donegal Senior Football Championship: 2017

=== Manager ===
Westmeath

- Leinster Senior Football Championship: 2026
- O'Byrne Cup: 2026

=== Individual ===
- All Star: 2012
- Irish News Ulster All Star: 2011, 2012
- Ulster Senior Football Championship Final Man of the Match: 2012
- The Sunday Game Team of the Year: 2012
- Gradam Shéamuis Mhic Géidigh: 2017

Sporting positions
Preceded by Dermot McCabe	Westmeath Senior Football Manager; 2025–	Succeeded by Incumbent
