= Paddy Small =

Gaelic footballer

Paddy Small is a Gaelic footballer who plays for the Ballymun Kickhams club and at senior level for the Dublin county team. He usually plays as a half-forward.
