= 2004 Leinster Senior Football Championship final =

Final Gaelic football match of 2004 in the Leinster province of Ireland

2004 Leinster Senior Football Final
- Event: 2004 Leinster Senior Football Championship
Laois	Westmeath
0-13	0-13
- Date: 18 July 2004
- Venue: Croke Park, Dublin
- Referee: Pat McEnaney (Monaghan)

2004 Leinster Senior Football Final Replay
Laois	Westmeath
0-10	0-12
- Date: 24 July 2004
- Venue: Croke Park, Dublin
- Referee: Mick Monahan (Kildare)

The 2004 Leinster Senior Football Championship final was the final football match of the 2004 Leinster Senior Football Championship (SFC), contested by Laois and Westmeath over two games in Croke Park, Dublin. The first game finished level so a replay occurred. Westmeath won their first ever title at senior level, leaving Wicklow and Fermanagh as the only other counties yet to achieve this. The season also saw the emergence of Denis Glennon.

== Pre-match ==
Westmeath had only ever appeared in two Leinster SFC finals in their history: in 1931 and 1949. They went into the 2004 Leinster SFC bidding to win their first ever title at senior level, with the only other counties still to achieve this being Wicklow and Fermanagh.

Westmeath midfielder Rory O'Connell was banned for 12-weeks for stamping on Offaly's Pascal Kellaghan during Westmeath's Leinster SFC win on 23 May 2004. This threatened O'Connell's participation in the final. Kellaghan submitted a letter saying the offence had not happened.

== Reaction ==
Commentators hailed Westmeath's win as monumental, with the Irish Independent's Eamonn Sweeney, 'Richard Stakelum famously greeted Tipperary's first Munster title in sixteen years with the words, "The famine is over." What Westmeath have endured makes the famine of other counties look more like minor spells of peckishness. There was a song a few years back which described the failures of the English soccer team as "thirty years of hurt." Thirty years? How about one hundred and twenty years of hurt. And those years never stopped Westmeath dreaming either.' Colm O'Rourke said it was "one of the greatest days ever in Croke Park and must have given rise to the biggest street party ever in [the Westmeath capital] Mullingar last night".

== Aftermath ==
Westmeath player David Mitchell later joined Longford.

== See also ==
- Marooned, documentary which followed Westmeath in their Championship winning season
