= Westmeath county football team =

Gaelic football team

Westmeath
- Sport: Football
- Irish: An Iarmhí
- Nickname(s): The Lake men
- County board: Westmeath GAA
- Manager: Mark McHugh
- Captain: Ronan Wallace
- Home venue(s): Cusack Park, Mullingar

Recent competitive record
- Current All-Ireland status: Leinster W in 2026
- Last championship title: None
- Current NFL Division: 3 (3rd in 2026)
- Last league title: 2024 (Division 3)
First colours	Second colours

The Westmeath county football team represents Westmeath in men's Gaelic football and is governed by Westmeath GAA, the county board of the Gaelic Athletic Association. The team competes in the three major annual inter-county competitions; the All-Ireland Senior Football Championship, the Leinster Senior Football Championship and the National Football League.

Westmeath's home ground is Cusack Park, Mullingar. The team's manager is Mark McHugh.

The team last won the Leinster Senior Championship in 2026 for the second time in their history, have never won the All-Ireland Senior Championship but won the National League six times.

== History ==
Westmeath's history is that of a minor county which only recently rose to the higher ranks of football. Its 2004 Leinster Senior Football Championship (SFC) provincial title was presaged by a 1995 All-Ireland Minor Football Championship (MFC) title and victory in the 1999 All-Ireland Under-21 Football Championship.

=== 1935–1995 ===
Another generation of Westmeath players took part in the first week-night fixture in the GAA championship: on 20 June 1935 they played Meath in Kells and lost by a scoreline of 2–7 to 0–9. The footballers won the 1929 Leinster Junior Football Championship (JFC), lost to Dublin by ten points in 1960 and then defeated Dublin to reach the 1931 Leinster SFC final. The team defeated Carlow, Laois and Offaly to advance to a 1949 Leinster SFC final against Meath, but was well beaten on both occasions. Twenty years later the team reached the National Football League semi-final. Westmeath defeated Dublin again in the 1967 Leinster SFC and the 1984 Centenary Cup campaign and qualified for a second League semi-final in 1994.

=== 2001–present ===
In 2001, the team went on an All-Ireland SFC run that lasted for an unprecedented nine games, including an extra-time win against Mayo in Roscommon. Prominent players in this campaign were Ger Heavin, Dessie Dolan, Rory O'Connell, Damien Healy and David Mitchell, with other players occasionally coming to prominence, including Martin Flanaghan, Fergal Wilson, Paul Conway, David O'Shaughnessy and Fergal Murray. The team's campaign ended when it lost to Meath in a 2001 All-Ireland SFC quarter-final replay. Uneventful 2002 and 2003 seasons followed and Westmeath parted terms with its then manager, Luke Dempsey.

Former Kerry player and manager Páidí Ó Sé was brought in to manage the senior team some months later, after he had been removed from his role as Kerry senior manager. The following year, under the management of Ó Sé, Westmeath progressed to the 2004 Leinster Senior Football Championship Final and won a first ever Leinster SFC title with a replayed victory over Laois (having previously beaten Wexford, Dublin and Offaly). However, the team tamely exited its second All-Ireland SFC quarter-final — losing to Derry. That campaign is covered in the documentary film Marooned.

Ó Sé quit Westmeath at the end of a poor 2005 season and his assistant Tomás Ó Flatharta replaced him. After a poor league campaign, in which the team nevertheless secured promotion from Division 2, Offaly knocked Westmeath out of the Leinster SFC in the first round. However, wins over London, Limerick, Sligo and, then, a historic defeat of Galway, at Pearse Stadium in Salthill, set up a third All-Ireland SFC quarter-final for the team in six years — against Dublin on this occasion. Westmeath did not live up to expectations in that game and sustained a ten-point defeat.

Westmeath staged a strong second half display to capture the 2008 Division 2 National Football League title for the third time, and the first since 2003 following a five-point win over Dublin at Páirc Tailteann in Navan. The scoreline in that game was Westmeath 0–15, Dublin 0–10.

Dublin defeated Westmeath by 27 points in the 2009 Leinster SFC quarter-final. Ó Flatharta resigned as Westmeath manager after the team's defeat to neighbour Meath on 11 July 2009.

The county board, searching for a manager after the resignation of Ó Flatharta, appointed Brendan Hackett as manager in September 2009, with the choice of someone who had not managed at that level for many years seen as unexpected. Hackett included Michael Carruth as a masseur and Eoin Rheinisch as part of "physical preparations" on his backroom team. Westmeath embarked on a second successive league campaign without winning a game and the team was relegated to Division 3 of the National Football League. Hackett resigned in April 2010. He did not contest a single championship match.

Under the management of Tom Cribbin the team reached consecutive Leinster SFC finals in 2015 and 2016. This was a first in the team's history. The team also won the 2017 NFL Division 4 title. Colin Kelly was appointed Cribbin's successor as Westmeath manager on a two-year term in late 2017 but left in mid-2018, citing family commitments.

Jack Cooney's appointment as Westmeath senior manager was ratified in September 2018, making him the first Westmeath native to fill the role since 1992. Under Cooney's management the team won the 2019 O'Byrne Cup, its first time to win that competition since 1988. Later that year it won the 2019 NFL Division 3 title. In 2022, Westmeath won the inaugural Tailteann Cup, defeating Cavan in the final at Croke Park. Cooney resigned unexpectedly the following month, and was succeeded by Dessie Dolan. Dolan walked in August 2024. Then it was Dermot McCabe. McCabe walked even quicker though, abandoning Westmeath after fewer than 10 months as manager. McCabe's exit was a shock. He was interviewed for another job on 9 August but stayed on until 11 August. Gerry Buckley – the journalist and historian – was quoted in the Westmeath Examiner as saying: "Westmeath deserved better" and that it was "outrageous" for Westmeath to have been "strung along" in this manner. Kieran Martin said it "should have been dealt with quicker; there was no point waiting to see if he got it or not. The fact that he was interested in another job was a sign: 'Right, maybe this isn't for him, we may go looking for someone else'". What would Westmeath do next? It fell to young Mark McHugh, who was hanging around as coach during the tumultuous McCabe affair. McHugh was appointed as manager. His first season speaks for itself: O'Byrne Cup winners for the first time since 2019, narrowly missing out on promotion on the last day of the league, winning the Leinster Senior Football Championship from the preliminary round (only Westmeath's second ever Leinster Title), beating the Dubs at Croker in that final, Brían Cooney scoring Westmeath's first Leinster Final goal in 95 years, a cracker from range that dropped over Evan Comerford, winning five championship games on the spin, a feat achieved against Cavan - managed by McCabe, after he abandoned Westmeath, an achievement in itself, since he would have been expected to know the Westmeath players inside and out. According to Cian Mackey: "Cavan, without a doubt, feel they should be beating Westmeath. They're Division 2. Westmeath are Division 3". According to the Irish Independent, "most observers were convinced it [the Leinster title] could never have happened without McHugh". Martin told that newspaper: "But it worked out the right way. We got Mark at the right time".

== Panel ==
Team for Westmeath vs Dublin in the 2026 Leinster Senior Football Championship final, 17 May 2026

No.	Player	Position	Club
1	Jason Daly	Goalkeeper	St Loman's Mullingar
2	Daniel Scahill	Right corner back	Shandonagh
3	Charlie Drumm	Full back	The Downs
4	Tadhg Baker	Left corner back	Caulry
5	Ronan Wallace	Right half back	Multyfarnham
6	Shane Allen	Centre back	Athlone
7	Matthew Whittaker	Left half back	Tubberclair
8	Brían Cooney	Midfield	Coralstown Kinnegad
9	Ray Connellan	Midfield	Athlone
10	Kevin O'Sullivan	Right half forward	The Downs
11	Sam McCartan	Centre forward	St Loman's Mullingar
12	Conor Dillon	Left half forward	Athlone
13	Shane Corcoran	Right corner forward	St.Malachys
14	Jack Duncan	Full forward	Milltown
15	Brandon Kelly	Left corner forward	Miltownpass

No.	Player	Position	Club
16	Jack Connaughton	Substitute	Caulry
17	Adam Treanor	Substitute	Shandonagh
18	Tom Molloy	Substitute	Shandonagh
19	Robbie Forde	Substitute	Moate All Whites
20	Ian Martin	Substitute	The Downs
21	TJ Cox	Substitute	St Loman's Mullingar
22	Shane Ormbsy	Substitute	Mullingar Shamrocks
23	Danny McCartan	Substitute	St Loman's Mullingar
24	Eoghan McCabe	Substitute	Tubberclair
25	Senan Baker	Substitute	Caulry
26	John Heslin	Substitute	St Loman's Mullingar

== Management team ==
Management team for 2025–26 season

- Manager: Mark McHugh
- Assistant manager/selector: Emmet McDonnell
- Head coach/selector: Ryan Daly
- Coach: Stephen 'Archie' Beattie
- Selector: Jamie Gonoud
- Head of Performance: Tom Gribben

== Managerial history ==
Westmeath have a history of appointing "foreign" managers, with Páidí Ó Sé the most successful appointment; Ó Sé led Westmeath to the 2004 Leinster SFC (a first in the team's history).

Westmeath managers, since the early 1990s, have included:

Dates	Name	Origin	Honours
1992–1995	Mattie Kerrigan		—N/a
1995–1997	Barney Rock		—N/a
1997–2000	Brendan Lowry		—N/a
2000–2003	Luke Dempsey		2003 NFL Division 2
2003–2005	Páidí Ó Sé		2004 Leinster Senior Football Championship
2005–2009	Tomás Ó Flatharta		2006 NFL Division 2, 2008 NFL Division 2
2009–2010	Brendan Hackett		—N/a
2010–2013	Pat Flanagan (Note: Flanagan was initially appointed as interim manager, in April 2010, following Hackett's departure.)		—N/a
2013–2014	Paul Bealin		—N/a
2014–2017	Tom Cribbin		2017 NFL Division 4
2017–2018	Colin Kelly		—N/a
2018–2022	Jack Cooney	Coralstown/Kinnegad	2019 O'Byrne Cup, 2019 NFL Division 3, 2022 Tailteann Cup
2022–2024	Dessie Dolan	Garrycastle	2024 NFL Division 3
2024–2025	Dermot McCabe	—N/a	—N/a
2025–	Mark McHugh		2026 O'Byrne Cup, 2026 Leinster Senior Football Championship

== Players ==
=== Records ===
==== Top scorers ====
Championship only, as of game played 9 July 2022.

#	Name	Career	Total	Goals	Points	Appearances	Average
1	John Heslin	2011–	177	5	162		
2	Dessie Dolan	1999–2014	175	4	163		
3	Denis Glennon	2004–20??	82	1	79		
4	Kieran Martin	2009–	61	8	37		
5	Fergal Wilson	1999–2011	60	1	57		

=== All Stars ===
Westmeath has 5 All Stars, as of 2008. 4 different players have won, as of 2008.

Winners

2001: Rory O'Connell
2004: Dessie Dolan^{1st win, 3rd nomination}
2004: John Keane
2008: Gary Connaughton^{1st win, 3rd nomination}
2008: John Keane^{2nd win}

Nominations

1999: Dessie Dolan
2001: Dessie Dolan^{2nd nomination}
2001: Ger Heavin
2001: David Mitchell
2004: Gary Connaughton
2004: Donal O'Donoghue
2004: Denis Glennon
2006: Gary Connaughton^{2nd nomination}
2008: Michael Ennis
2015: Kieran Martin

== Honours ==
=== National ===
- All-Ireland Senior Football Championship
  - Quarter-finalists (2): 2001, 2004
- Tailteann Cup
  - (gold) Winners (1): 2022
- National Football League Division 2
  - (gold) Winners (3): 2000–01, 2003, 2008
- National Football League Division 3
  - (gold) Winners (2): 2019, 2024
- National Football League Division 4
  - (gold) Winners (1): 2017
- National Football League Cup
  - (gold) Winners (1): 1982–83
- All-Ireland Under-21 Football Championship
  - (gold) Winners (1): 1999
- All-Ireland Minor Football Championship
  - (gold) Winners (1): 1995
  - (silver) Runners-up (1): 1963

=== Provincial ===
- Leinster Senior Football Championship
  - (gold) Winners (2): 2004, 2026
  - (silver) Runners-up (4): 1931, 1949, 2015, 2016
- O'Byrne Cup
  - (gold) Winners (5): 1959, 1980, 1988, 2019, 2026
- Leinster Junior Football Championship
  - (gold) Winners (4): 1905, 1915, 1929, 1940
- Leinster Under-21 Football Championship
  - (gold) Winners (2): 1999, 2000
  - (silver) Runners-up (3): 1995, 1997, 2010
- Leinster Minor Football Championship
  - (gold) Winners (5): 1939, 1952, 1963, 1995, 2000
  - (silver) Runners-up (5): 1951, 1982, 1984, 1992, 2013
