= 2026 O'Byrne Cup =

Gaelic football competition in Leinster, Ireland

Tournament details
- Province: Leinster
- Year: 2026
- Trophy: O'Byrne Cup
- Date: 3–16 January 2026
- Teams: 11
- Defending champions: Longford

Winners
- Champions: Westmeath (5th win)
- Manager: Mark McHugh
- Captain: Ronan Wallace

Runners-up
- Runners-up: Kildare
- Manager: Brian Flanagan
- Captain: Kevin Feely

Other
- Matches played: 9 (Cup); 4 (Shield)

The 2026 O'Byrne Cup is a Gaelic football competition for county teams in the province of Leinster.

The draw was announced in November 2025, with the competition starting on 3 January. Features included penalties to decide matches instead of extra time, any number of substitutions permitted, matches being reduced to 60 minutes, and "a Shield competition" intended to guarantee every team is involved in more than one match (except for Louth).

Longford were aiming to complete a three-in-a-row, but were eliminated without playing as their first round game was cancelled due to a frozen pitch. They lost on a coin toss to Westmeath who went on to win the tournament after defeating Louth, Offaly and Kildare.

== Competition format ==
The eleven teams are drawn to play in a knockout system. Ten of them play in the first round, while one (Louth) goes straight to the quarter-final.

Three of the first round winners go into the quarter-finals, and two of them go straight to the semi-finals.

The quarter-finals feature the team that received a bye (Louth) and three first-round winners. The two quarter-final winners advance to the semi-finals.

The five losers in the first round are transferred to the O'Byrne Shield, which is also a straight knockout. This structure means that every team, except for Louth, is guaranteed at least two games.

Drawn games go to penalty shootout. Games which cannot be played due to weather conditions are decided by coin toss.

== O'Byrne Cup ==
=== Round 1 ===
3 January 2026
13:30 IWT (UTC±0)
Match 1

Report

Laois	1-17 (20) – (23) 4-14	Dublin
(HT: 0-10 - 3-3)
Pts: Evan O'Carroll 0-6 (5f), Killian Byrne 1-0, Killian Roche 0-3 (1tpf, 1f), Matthew Byron 0-2 (tpf), Brian Byrne 0-2, Cian Doyle 0-1 (f), Paddy O'Sullivan 0-1, Colin Dunne 0-1, Ben O'Connor 0-1		Pts: Niall O'Callaghan 1-6 (3tp), Tim Deering 1-0, Robert Shaw 1-0, Eoin Kennedy 1-0, Clyde Burke 0-3 (1tp), Sean Guiden 0-3 (2f), Kevin Stephenson 0-1, Jack Lundy 0-1

Park–Ratheniska GAA, Ratheniska
Referee: James Foley (Meath)

3 January 2026
13:30 IWT (UTC±0)
Match 2

Report

Wexford	0-09 (9) – (18) 2-12	Kildare
(HT: 0-2 - 1-8)
Pts: Colum Feeney 0-3 (1tp), Niall Hughes 0-2 (tp), Pairi Hughes 0-2, Liam Coleman 0-1		Pts: Darragh Swords 1-2, Sam Doran 1-1, Brian McLoughlin 0-2 (1f), Ben Loakman 0-2, Niall Dolan 0-2 (tp), Liam Kelly 0-1, Dara Crowley 0-1, Aaron Browne 0-1 (f)

St Patrick's Park, Enniscorthy
Referee: Darragh Byrne (Wicklow)

3 January 2026
13:30 IWT (UTC±0)
Match 3

Report

Carlow	3-09 (18) – (23) 3-14	Offaly
(HT: 1-6 - 1-7)
Pts: Adam McCarron 2-3, Paddy McDonnell 1-0, Colm Hulton 0-3, Darragh Foley 0-2 (2f), Mark Foley 0-1		Pts: Rory Egan 1-4 (1tp), Harry Plunkett 0-4 (3f), Aaron Leavy 1-0, Cormac Egan 1-0, Ciaran Murphy 0-2 (tp), Darragh Flynn 0-2, Keith O'Neill 0-2

Páirc Uí Bhriain, Carlow
Referee: Ryan Moran (Kildare)

3 January 2026
13:30 IWT (UTC±0)
Match 4

Report

Wicklow	1-12 (15) – (17) 2-11	Meath
(HT: 0-4 - 2-7)
Pts: Padraig O'Toole 1-1, Mark Jackson 0-4 (2tpf), Dean Healy 0-2, Jack Hardy 0-1, Oisin McGraynor 0-1, Chris O'Brien 0-1, Paidi Kavanagh 0-1, Eoin Darcy 0-1		Pts: Diarmuid Moriarty 1-4 (2f), Killian Smyth 1-0, Niall Finnerty 0-3 (1tp), Conor Gray 0-2 (tp), Oisin Martin 0-2

Echelon Park, Aughrim
Referee: Paddy McDermott

3 January 2026
13:30 IWT (UTC±0)
Match 5

Longford	scr. – w/o	Westmeath

Glennon Bros Pearse Park, Longford

Match 5 not played due to frozen pitch. Match was decided via coin toss.

=== Quarter-finals ===
7 January 2026
19:30 IWT (UTC±0)
Quarter-final 1

Offaly	2-13 (19) – (15) 0-15	Meath
(HT: 2-9 - 0-6)
Pts: Jordan Hayes 1-4 (1tpf), Ciaran Murphy 0-3, Cormac Egan 1-0, Keith O'Neill 0-2 (1f), Daire McDaid 0-1, Ryan Egan 0-1, Eoin Sawyer 0-1, Jack Bryant 0-1 (f)		Pts: Daithi McGowan 0-6 (1tpf, 3f), Diarmuid Moriarty 0-4 (1tpf), Oisin Martin 0-2 (tp), Darragh Campion 0-2, Rian Stafford 0-1

Gracefield GAA, Gracefield
Referee: Enda Kelly (Westmeath)

7 January 2026
19:30 IWT (UTC±0)
Quarter-final 2

Report

Westmeath	2-15 (21) – (15) 0-15	Louth
(HT: 2-5 - 0-9)
Pts: Luke Loughlin 0-5 (1tpf), Brandon Kelly 1-1, Brian Guerin 1-0, Robbie Forde 0-3 (2f), Kevin O'Sullivan 0-2, Tom Molloy 0-2, Tadhg Baker 0-1, Kealan Connell 0-1		Pts: Ryan Burns 0-8 (2tpf, 2f, 1'45), Dylan McKeown 0-4 (1tpf, 1f), Conall McCaul 0-2, Eoghan Callaghan 0-1

St Loman's Park, Mullingar
Referee: Lar Murphy

=== Semi-finals ===
10 January 2026
14:00 IWT (UTC±0)
Semi-final 2

Report

Offaly	2-08 (14) – (27) 5-12	Westmeath
(HT: 1-3 — 2-7)
Pts: Ciaran Murphy 2-0, Darragh Flynn 0-2 (2f), Jack Bryant 0-2 (1f), Diarmuid Egan 0-1, Cormac Egan 0-1, Eoin Sawyer 0-1, Harry Plunkett 0-1 (f)		Pts: Brandon Kelly 2-1, Danny McCartan 2-0, Senan Baker 1-0, Ronan Wallace 0-3, Luke Loughlin 0-3 (2f), Matthew Whittaker 0-1, Brían Cooney 0-1, Robbie Forde 0-1

TEG Cusack Park, Mullingar

10 January 2026
17:00 IWT (UTC±0)
Semi-final 1

Report

Kildare	1-22 (25) – (16) 1-13	Dublin
(HT: 0-10 — 1-10)
Pts: Alex Beirne 0-7 (1'45, 1f), Harry O'Neill 1-0, James Harris 0-3 (1tp), Sam Doran 0-3, Brian McLoughlin 0-2, Darragh Swords 0-2, Eoin Cully 0-2, Ben Loakman 0-1, Kevin Feely 0-1, Aaron Browne 0-1 (f)		Pts: Clyde Burke 0-5 (2tp), James McCarville 1-0, Dylan Kettle 0-2, Eoin Kennedy 0-1, Sam Moloney 0-1 ('45), Niall O'Callaghan 0-1, Luke Gifford 0-1

St Conleth's Park, Newbridge
Referee: Eamonn O'Connor (Offaly)

=== Final ===
TG4

16 January 2026
19:30 IWT (UTC±0)
O'Byrne Cup Final

Report

Kildare	1-16 (19) – (21) 1-18	Westmeath
(HT: 0-08 – 0-04)
Gls: Liam Kelly 1 Pts: Alex Beirne 5 (1x2p, 1 '45', 1f), Brian McLoughlin 4 (1x2p), Ben Loakman 3 (1x2p), Kevin Feely 2(2p), Eoin Cully 1, Calum Bolton 1		Gls: Ronan Wallace 1 Pts: Luke Loughlin 8 (3x2p, 1 '45'), Ronan Wallace 7 (3x2p), Danny McCartan 2, Senan Baker 1f

St Conleth's Park, Newbridge
Referee: Kevin Williamson

== O'Byrne Shield ==
=== Quarter-final ===
7 January 2026
19:30 IWT (UTC±0)

Report

Carlow	1-13 (16) – (13) 0-13	Wexford
(HT: 0-5 - 0-7)
Pts: Colm Hulton 1-3 (1f), Shane Clarke 0-2, Conor Crowley 0-2 (1f), Tadhg Roche 0-1, Conor Doyle 0-1 (f), Sean Murphy 0-1, Ross Dunphy 0-1, Paddy McDonnell 0-1, Patrick Doyle 0-1		Pts: Sean Nolan 0-6 (1tp), Cathal Kehoe 0-2, Eoghan Nolan 0-1, Shane Doyle 0-1, James Lawless 0-1, Mark Rossiter 0-1, Pairic Hughes 0-1

Tullow GAA, Tullow
Referee: Stephen Fagan (Wicklow)

=== Semi-finals ===
10 January 2026
14:00 IWT (UTC±0)

Report

Carlow	2-15 (21) – (18) 3-09	Laois
(HT: 1-8 - 1-6)
Pts: Conor Doyle 0-5 (2tp), Colm Hulton 1-2, Ross Dunphy 1-1, Paddy McDonnell 0-2, Tadhg Roche 0-1, Sean Murphy 0-1, Conor Crowley 0-1 (f), Mikey Bambrick 0-1, Shane Clarke 0-1		Pts: Alan Kinsella 2-0, Paul Kingston 1-1 (1f, 1pen), Matthew Byron 0-3 (1'45, 1tpf), Cian Nolan 0-3, Niall Corbet 0-1, Jake Darcy 0-1

Fr Ryan Park, Rathvilly
Referee: Darragh Byrne (Wicklow)

10 January 2026
14:00 IWT (UTC±0)

Report

Wicklow	3-15 (24) – (14) 1-11	Longford
(HT: 2-6 - 0-5)
Pts: Eoin Darcy 1-3 (1f, 1tpf), Mark Jackson 0-5 (1tp, 1tpf), Sean Murphy 1-0, Conor Fee 1-0, Chris O'Brien 0-2 (tp), Liam O'Neill 0-2, John Paul Nolan 0-1, Tom Moran 0-1, Oisin McGraynor 0-1 (f), Padraig O'Toole 0-1		Pts: Dessie Reynolds 0-5 (1tp), Matthew Carey 0-4 (1f), Cathal McCabe 1-0, Jayson Matthews 0-1, Paddy Mollaghan 0-1

Bray Emmets GAA, Bray

=== Shield Final ===
16 January 2026
19:30 IWT (UTC±0)
O'Byrne Shield Final

Carlow	2-13 (19) – (10) 1-07	Wicklow
(HT: 2-07 – 1-04)

SETU, Carlow
Referee: Ultan McElroy
