= 2011 National Football League (Ireland) =

Gaelic football competition

League details
- Dates: 5 February – 24 April 2011
- Teams: 33

League champions
- Winners: Cork (7th win)
- Captain: Michael Shields
- Manager: Conor Counihan

League runners-up
- Runners-up: Dublin
- Captain: Bryan Cullen
- Manager: Pat Gilroy

Other division winners
- Division 2: Donegal
- Division 3: Louth
- Division 4: Longford

The 2011 National Football League was a competition run by the Gaelic Athletic Association (GAA) between February and April 2011. It was contested by 33 teams, representing the 32 counties of Ireland plus London. Cork retained the title after a 0–21 to 2–14 win against Dublin.

== Format ==
The 2011 the National Football League had four divisions, the top three consisting of eight teams, and Division 4 of nine. Each team played each other team in its division once, with two points awarded for a win, and one for a draw. The top two teams in each of divisions 2, 3 and 4 were promoted, and contested the finals of their respective divisions; the top two teams in Division 1 contested the 2011 NFL final. The bottom two teams in each of divisions 1, 2 and 3 were relegated.

== Division 1 ==
=== Division 1 ===
==== Table ====
Advanced to NFL final Automatic relegation to Division 2

Team	Pld	W	D	L	F	A	Diff	Pts
Dublin	7	6	1	0	16–82	6–92	20	13
Cork	7	5	0	2	6–110	7–91	16	10
Kerry	7	5	0	2	6–93	5–74	22	10
Down	7	3	1	3	7–85	8–84	-2	7
Mayo	7	2	1	4	10–84	11–85	-4	5
Armagh	7	2	0	5	6–82	7–95	-16	4
Monaghan	7	2	0	5	3–93	6–96	-12	4
Galway	7	1	1	5	2–91	6-103	-24	3

- Cork were placed ahead of Kerry as they won the head-to-head match between the teams (6 February at Tralee: 0-17 - 1-13).
- Armagh were placed ahead of Monaghan as they won the head-to-head match between the teams (20 February at Athletic Grounds: 1-11 - 0-13).

==== Fixtures and results ====
5 February 2011 Round 1	Mayo	1-13 – 3-07	Down	McHale Park, Castlebar
	A Moran 0-6 (0-3f), A Freeman 1-1, M Ronaldson 0-3 (0-2f), A Dillon, E Varley, K McLaughlin 0-1 each	Report	M Clarke 1-3, (1-0 '45', 0-2f), J Clarke, C Maginn 1-1 each, D Hughes 0-2.	Referee: Cormac Reilly (Meath)

5 February 2011 Round 1	Armagh	1-11 – 2-12	Dublin	Athletic Grounds, Armagh
	C Vernon 1-1, G Swift, S McDonnell (2f) 0-4 each, M O'Rourke, BJ Padden 0-1 each.	Report	B Brogan 1-3, D Connolly 1-1, K McManamon, T Quinn (1 '45) 0-2 each, D Lally, P Flynn, MD Macauley, E O'Gara 0-1 each.	Referee: Joe McQuillan (Cavan)

6 February 2011 Round 1	Monaghan	0-19 – 0-14	Galway	Grattan Park, Inniskeen
	P Finlay 0-6 (5f), C McManus 0-5 (2f), D Clerkin, M Downey and C McGuinness 0-2 each, N McAdam and C Galligan 0-1 each.	Report	S Armstrong 0-4 (2f), E Hoare, C Bane and M Clancy (1f) 0-2 each, G O'Donnell, G Higgins, G Sice and D Cummins 0-1 each.	Referee: Maurice Deegan (Laois)

6 February 2011 Round 1	Kerry	1-13 – 0-17	Cork	Austin Stack Park, Tralee
	D Geaney 0-4 (1f), P Geaney 1-0, K Donaghy, D Walsh 0-2 each, Darran O'Sullivan, D Moran, BJ Walsh (f), BJ Keane, K O'Leary (f) 0-1 each.	Report	D Goulding 0-7 (3f, 3 '45s), D O'Connor 0-6 (4f), F Goold, C O'Neill, C O'Driscoll, P Kelly 0-1 each.	Referee: Michael Duffy (Sligo)

19 February 2011 Round 2	Dublin	3-13 – 0-16	Cork	Croke Park, Dublin
	B Brogan 0-6 (4f), M Quinn 1-1, K McManamon, B Cahill 1-0 each, D Lally 0-2, D Bastick, D Connolly, J McCarthy, B Cullen 0-1 each	Report	G Goulding 0-5 (1f, 1'45'), P Kelly, P O'Neill 0-3 each, D O'Connor 0-2 (1f), A Walsh, F Goold, D O'Sullivan 0-1 each	Referee: D Coldrick (Meath)

20 February 2011 Round 2	Mayo	0-08 - 1-09	Kerry	McHale Park, Castlebar
	A Campbell (2f) 0-2, R McGarrity, A O'Shea, M Ronaldson (f), K McLoughlin, N Douglas, A Moran all 0-1 each	Report	B Sheehan (1-0 pen) 1-1, D Geaney 0-4 (2f), D O'Sullivan 0-2, C Cooper (f), K O'Leary 0-1 each.	Referee: M Deegan (Laois)

20 February 2011 Round 2	Down	2-11 - 1-09	Galway	Páirc Esler, Newry
	P Fitzpatrick 1-1, C Maginn 1-0, D Rooney, C Lavery, M Clarke, M Poland (2f) 0-2 each, D Hughes, P McComiskey 0-1 each	Report	G O'Donnell 1-0, S Armstrong 0-3 (1f), J Bergin, C Bane (1f), M Clancy (2f) 0-2 each	Referee: E Kinsella (Laois)

20 February 2011 Round 2	Armagh	1-11 - 0-13	Monaghan	Athletic Grounds, Armagh
	S McDonnell 0-5 (3f), R Grugan 0-4 (3f), B Mallon 1-0, M O'Rourke, A Mallon 0-1 each	Report	P Finlay 0-7 (5f), C McManus 0-5 (2f), M Downey 0-1	Referee: C Reilly (Meath)

26 February 2011 Round 3	Dublin	3-10 - 1-15	Kerry	Croke Park, Dublin
	K McManamon, MD Macauley 1-1 each, B Brogan 0-4 (3f), T Quinn 1-0, P Flynn, E O'Gara, D Lally, A Brogan 0-1 each	Report	B Sheehan 1-5 (1-0 pen, 3f, 1 '45'), C Cooper 0-6 (1f), D O'Sullivan 0-2, D Walsh, D Moran 0-1 each.	Referee: M Duffy (Sligo)

26 February 2011 Round 3	Down	0-12 - 0-11	Armagh	Páirc Esler, Newry
	M Clarke 0-3 (2f), R Murtagh, D Hughes, M Poland (1f) 0-2 each, K McKernan, C Laverty, C Maginn, 0-1 each.	Report	S McDonnell 0-3 (2f), C Vernon, R Grogan (2f) 0-2 each, K Dyas, J Murtagh, C McKeever, B Mallon 0-1 each.	Referee: P McEnaney (Monaghan)

27 February 2011 Round 3	Galway	0-12 - 2-14	Mayo	St. Jarlath's Park, Tuam
	C Bane 0-5 (2f), S Armstrong 0-4 (2f, 1 '45), J Bergin 0-3.	Report	J Doherty 2-1, A Dillon 0-5 (4f), A Campbell (2f), K McLoughlin 0-3 each, A Moran, A O'Shea (1f) 0-1 each.	Referee: D Fahy (Longford)

27 February 2011 Round 3	Cork	1-15 - 1-12	Monaghan	Páirc Uí Chaoimh, Cork
	P O'Neill 0-5, D Goulding 0-4 (3f), P Kelly 1-1, F Goold 0-2, C O'Driscoll, C O'Neill, D O'Connor 0-1 each.	Report	O Duffy 1-3, P Finlay 0-3 (2f), C McManus (1f), D Clerkin 0-2 each, C McGuinness, D Mone 0-1 each.	Referee: D Coldrick (Meath)

12 March 2011 Round 4	Cork	3-17 - 0-15	Down	Páirc Uí Rinn, Cork
	D Goulding 0-7 (5f), P Kelly 1-2 (1f), C O'Neill 1-1, F Goold 0-3, P O'Neill 1-0, C Sheehan 0-2, D Goold, A Walsh 0-1 each	Report	M Poland 0-3 (2f), R Murtagh, M Clarke (1f) 0-2 each, K McKernan, C Murdock (1 '45'), P Fitzpatrick, C Laverty, D Hughes, D Rooney, A Branagan, C Garvey 0-1 each.	Referee: D Fahy (Longford)

13 March 2011 Round 4	Mayo	1-10 - 2-10	Armagh	McHale Park, Castlebar
	J Doherty 1-1, A Moran, A Campbell (3f) 0-3 each, A Dillon 0-2 (1f), A Kilcoyne 0-1.	Report	S McDonnell 0-6 (4f), B Mallon, P Duffy 1-0 each, K Toner, C Vernon, J Murtagh, C McKeever 0-1 each	Referee: S Doyle (Wexford)

13 March 2011 Round 4	Kerry	0-16 - 0-08	Galway	FitzGerald Stadium, Killarney
	C Cooper 0-8 (2f), B Sheehan 0-3 (3f), D Walsh 0-2, K Donaghy, T O Se, S Scanlon 0-1 each	Report	O Concannon 0-4 (3f), C Bane 0-2, G Sice, J Bergin 0-1 each	Referee: M Condon (Waterford)

13 March 2011 Round 4	Monaghan	1-09 - 0-13	Dublin	St Tiernach's Park, Clones
	C McManus 1-2, P Finlay 0-3 (3f), C McGuinness, D Mone, M Downey, T Freeman 0-1 each	Report	B Brogan 0-4 (3f), D Connolly 0-3, P Andrews, A Brogan, T Quinn, D Nelson, K McManamon, D Lally 0-1 each	Referee: M Duffy (Sligo)

19 March 2011 Round 5	Down	1-16 - 0-11	Monaghan	Páirc Esler, Newry
	M Clarke 1-4 (1-0 pen, 3f), P McComiskey 0-3, D Rooney, D Hughes, M Poland 0-2 each, B Coulter, A Carr, C Maginn 0-1 each.	Report	P Finlay 0-8 (6f), C McManus 0-2 (1f), C Galligan 0-1.	Referee: D Coldrick (Meath)

20 March 2011 Round 5	Armagh	1-09 - 1-13	Kerry	Athletic Grounds, Armagh
	B Sheehan 0-4 (4f), K O'Leary, C Cooper (1f) 0-3 each, Darran O'Sullivan 1-0, D Moran 0-2 (1f), A Maher 0-1.	Report	S McDonnell 0-5 (3f), K Toner 1-0, P Duffy 0-2, C McKeever, G Swift 0-1 each.	Referee: P McEnaney (Monaghan)

20 March 2011 Round 5	Galway	0-13 - 0-16	Cork	Pearse Stadium, Galway
	C Bane 0-5 (2f), M Clancy, P Conroy 0-2 each, E Concannon (1f), F Breathnach, F Hanley, A Flaherty (1 '45') 0-1 each.	Report	D Goulding 0-7 (3f), F Goold, S Keily, P Kelly (1f) 0-2, A O'Connor, K O'Driscoll, J Fitzpatrick 0-1 each.	Referee: E Kinsella (Laois)

20 March 2011 Round 5	Dublin	4-15 - 3-13	Mayo	Croke Park, Dublin
	D Connolly 3-3, T Quinn 1-7 (0-7f), K McManamon 0-2, D Nelson, MD Macauley, A Brogan 0-1 each.	Report	A Freeman 1-3, J Doherty 2-0, A Campbell 0-3 (0-2f), R Feeney, A Dillon (0-2f), A Moran 0-2 each, P Gardiner 0-1 each.	Referee: M Deegan (Laois)

2 April 2011 Round 6	Dublin	2-10 - 0-13	Down	Croke Park, Dublin
	P Flynn 1-1, A Brogan 1-1 T Quinn 0-4 (3f), D Connolly, B Cahill, B Cullen, B Brogan 0-1 each.	Report	M Clarke 0-3 (3f), P McComiskey, B Coulter, D Hughes 0-2 each, M Poland, P Fitzpatrick, K McKernan, C Maginn 0-1 each.	Referee: S Doyle (Wexford).

3 April 2011 Round 6	Mayo	1-13 - 0-14	Cork	McHale Park, Castlebar
	A Dillon 0-05, J Doherty 1-01, J Kilcullen, A Moran 0-02 each, A O'Shea, A Freeman, C O'Connor 0-01 each	Report	D Goulding 0-07, P O'Neill, J Miskella 0-02 each, S Kiely, F Lynch, P Kerrigan 0-01 each	Referee: Rory Hickey (Clare)

3 April 2011 Round 6	Monaghan	0-11 - 1-14	Kerry	Grattan Park, Inniskeen
	C McManus 0-4 (4f), O Duffy, T Freeman, C McGuinness, C Walshe, M Downey, B O'Brien, S Smyth 0-1 each	Report	Declan O'Sullivan 1-2, D Geaney 0-4 (2f), K O'Leary 0-3 (2f), N O'Mahony 0-2, D Moran, A Maher, P Galvin 0-1 each	Referee: C Reilly (Meath)

3 April 2011 Round 6	Armagh	0-18 - 1-20	Galway	Athletic Grounds, Armagh
	S McDonnell 0-09 (0-04f), J Clarke, M Mackin 0-03 each, M O'Rourke 0-02, K Dyas 0-01	Report	C Bane 1-04 (1-00 pen, 0-02f), P Joyce 0-05 (0-01f), P Conroy 0-04, G Sice 0-03, O Concannon, G Higgins, J Bergin, F Hanley 0-01 each	Referee: Joe McQuillan (Cavan)

10 April 2011 Round 7	Cork	2-15 - 1-12	Armagh	Páirc Uí Chaoimh, Cork
	D O'Connor 2-3 (1-0 pen, 0-1f), D Goulding 0-7 (3f), C Sheehan, A Walsh 0-2 each, P Kerrigan 0-1	Report	A Kernan 1-2 (0-1f), J Clarke, S McDonnell (2f, 1 '45) 0-4 each, BJ Padden, A Mallon 0-1 each.	Referee: M Condon (Waterford)

10 April 2011 Round 7	Monaghan	1-18 - 2-13	Mayo	Grattan Park, Inniskeen
	P Finlay 0-11 (9f), T Freeman 1-3, C McManus 0-3 (3f), D Hughes 0-1	Report	J Doherty 1-3 (0-2f), A Moran 1-1, A Campbell 0-4 (2f), J Burke 0-2, K McLoughlin, A Freeman, A Kilcoyne 0-1 each.	Referee: E Kinsella (Laois)

10 April 2011 Round 7	Galway	0-15 - 2-09	Dublin	Pearse Stadium, Galway
	P Joyce (4f), C Bane (2f) 0-4 each, P Conroy 0-3, O Concannen, G Bradshaw, G Sice, K Brady 0-1 each	Report	B Brogan 0-5 (4f), A Brogan 1-0, P Burke 1-0, S Murray, D Bastick, P Flynn, D Kelly 0-1 each.	Referee: P Fox (Westmeath)

10 April 2011 Round 7	Kerry	1-13 - 1-11	Down	FitzGerald Stadium, Killarney
	Darran O'Sullivan 1-2, B Sheehan 0-4 (3f), C Cooper 0-3 (1f), Declan O'Sullivan 0-2, A Maher, K Donaghy 0-1 each	Report	M Poland 0-5 (4f) B Coulter 1-0, M Clarke 0-3 (1f), J Colgan, C Maginn, C Garvey 0-1 each.	Referee: R Hickey (Clare)

==== Final ====
24 April 2011
Final

Dublin	2-14 - 0-21	Cork
B Brogan 1-3, (0-1f), K McManamon 0-5, T Quinn 1-2, D Connolly 0-2, B Cahill, K Nolan 0-1 each	Report	D Goulding (2f), C Sheehan 0-4 each, D O'Connor (1f), P O'Neill, P Kelly 0-3 each, F Goold, J O'Sullivan, N O'Leary, F Lynch 0-1 each

Croke Park, Dublin
Attendance: 36,348
Referee: J McQuillan (Cavan)

==== Top scorers ====
Overall

Rank	Player	County	Tally	Total	Matches	Average
1	Daniel Goulding	Cork	0-48	48	8	6.00
2	Paul Finlay	Monaghan	0-38	38	6	6.33
3	Steven McDonnell	Armagh	0-36	36	7	5.14
4	Bernard Brogan	Dublin	2-26	32	7	4.57
5	Tomás Quinn	Dublin	4-17	29	7	4.14
6	Jason Doherty	Mayo	7-06	27	6	4.50
6	Cormac Bane	Galway	1-24	27	7	3.85
8	Martin Clarke	Down	2-20	26	7	3.71
8	Conor McManus	Monaghan	1-23	26	7	3.71
10	Diarmuid Connolly	Dublin	4-11	23	8	2.87
10	Bryan Sheehan	Kerry	2-17	23	5	4.60

Single game

Rank	Player	County	Tally	Total	Opposition
1	Diarmuid Connolly	Dublin	3-03	12	Mayo
2	Paul Finlay	Monaghan	0-11	11	Mayo
3	Tomás Quinn	Dublin	1-07	10	Mayo
4	Donncha O'Connor	Cork	2-03	9	Armagh
5	Bryan Sheehan	Kerry	1-05	8	Dublin
5	Colm Cooper	Kerry	0-08	8	Galway
5	Paul Finlay	Monaghan	0-08	8	Down
8	Jason Doherty	Mayo	2-01	7	Galway
8	Martin Clarke	Down	1-04	7	Monaghan
8	Daniel Goulding	Cork	0-07	7	Kerry
8	Paul Finlay	Monaghan	0-07	7	Armagh
8	Daniel Goulding	Cork	0-07	7	Down
8	Daniel Goulding	Cork	0-07	7	Galway
8	Daniel Goulding	Cork	0-07	7	Armagh

== Division 2 ==
=== Table ===
Compete in Division 2 final and automatic promotion to Division 1 Automatic relegation to Division 3

Team	Pld	W	D	L	F	A	Diff	Pts
Donegal	7	4	2	1	7–90	6–69	24	10
Laois	7	5	0	2	6-98	7-72	23	10
Derry	7	5	0	2	6-90	6-92	-2	10
Tyrone	7	4	1	2	5-89	3-80	15	9
Kildare	7	4	1	2	4-81	3-80	4	9
Meath	7	1	1	5	6-80	4-97	-11	3
Sligo	7	1	1	5	6-83	7-90	-10	3
Antrim	7	1	0	4	3–78	7–109	-43	2

- Donegal, Laois and Derry are ranked by score difference.
- Meath were placed ahead of Sligo as they won the head-to-head match between the teams (20 February at Páirc Tailteann: 1-12 - 0-8).

=== Fixtures and results ===
5 February 2011 Round 1	Laois	1-14 – 1-11	Meath	O'Moore Park, Portlaoise
	MJ Tierney 0-9 (7f); J O'Loughlin 1-1; B Sheehan, N Donoher, R Munnelly, B Quigley 0-1 each.	Report	C Ward 0-3 (3f); N Crawford 1-0; J Sheridan, S McAnarney 0-2 each; S O'Rourke, G Reilly, S Kenny, B Farrell 0-1 each.	Referee: Patrick Fox (Westmeath)

5 February 2011 Round 1	Donegal	2-11 – 1-14	Sligo	Ballybofey
	M Murphy 1-2 (pen, 2f), N McGee 1-0, L McLoone, D Molloy 0-2 (2f) each, C McFadden 0-3, S Griffin, R Kavanagh 0-1 each.	Report	M Breheny (2f), A Marren 0-4 each; D Kelly 1-1; T Taylor 0-2, S Gilmartin, M Quinn, S Davey 0-1 each.	Referee: Pádraig Hughes (Armagh)

6 February 2011 Round 1	Antrim	0-11 – 1-17	Kildare	Casement Park
	P Cunningham 0-8 (7f), M Dougan 0-2 (1f), K Niblock 0-1.	Report	J Doyle 0-8 (8f), E Callaghan 0-4, K Cribbin 1-0, F Dowling 0-2, B Flanagan, H Lynch, P O'Neill 0-1 each.	Referee: Martin Higgins (Fermanagh)

6 February 2011 Round 1	Derry	1-11 – 0-13	Tyrone	Celtic Park
	SL McGoldrick 1-2, P Bradley 0-3, E McGuckian 0-2, C Gilligan (0-1f), PJ McCloskey, C O'Boyle, C McGoldrick 0-1 each.	Report	M Penrose (0-3f), S Cavanagh (0-2f), 0-4 each, D McCaul, R McMenamin, B McGuigan, A Cassidy, E McGinley 0-1 each.	Referee: Martin Duffy (Sligo)

19 February 2011 Round 2	Tyrone	0-06 - 1-10	Donegal	Omagh
	M Penrose 0-3 (3f), S Cavanagh (f), P Harte, E McGinley 0-1 each	Report	D Molloy 1-2, C McFadden 0-4 (3f), M Murphy 0-3 (2f), L McLoone 0-1	Referee: P Fox (Westmeath)

20 February 2011 Round 2	Laois	1-12 - 0-10	Antrim	Portlaoise
	MJ Tierney 1-2 (0-1f), D Strong 0-3, Niall Donoher 0-2, B Quigley, J O'Loughlin, R Munnelly (1f), P Cahillane, G Kavanagh 0-1 each	Report	P Cunningham 0-5 (4f), K Brady 0-2, A Healy, K Niblock, C Murray 0-1 each	Referee: M Condon (Waterford)

20 February 2011 Round 2	Meath	1-12 - 0-08	Sligo	Páirc Tailteann
	S O'Rourke 0-4 (3f), B Farrell 1-0, G Reilly, S McAnarney, J Sheridan 0-2 each, D Morgan, T Walsh 0-1 each	Report	M Breheny (1f), A Costello (1f) 0-2 each, C Harrison, S Gilmartin, D Maye (f) and A Marren 0-1 each	Referee: R Hickey (Clare)

20 February 2011 Round 2	Kildare	0-11 - 0-13	Derry	Newbridge
	J Doyle 0-7 (4f), F Dowling 0-2, P O'Neill, A Smith 0-1 each	Report	C Gilligan 0-7 (3f, 1 '45), P Bradley 0-3 (2f), SL McGoldrick, M Lynch, J Kielt 0-1 each	Referee: S Doyle (Wexford)

26 February 2011 Round 3	Antrim	0-14 - 0-11	Meath	Casement Park, Belfast
	P Cunningham 0-9 (8f), T Scullion 0-2, S Burke, K Niblock, T O'Neill 0-1 each.	Report	S O'Rourke 0-3 (2f), G Reilly 0-3, C Ward 0-3 (2f), D Morgan, J Sheridan 0-1.	Referee: P Hughes (Armagh)

27 February 2011 Round 3	Derry	1-07 - 1-21	Laois	Celtic Park, Derry
	P Bradley 1-3 (2 penalties, 2f), C Gilligan 0-2 (2f), J Kielt and E Bradley 0-1 each.	Report	MJ Tierney 0-5 (3f), R Munnelly 0-4, P Cahillane 1-0, D Strong 0-3, D Carroll 0-3 (2f), B Sheehan 0-2, S Julian, C Boyle, C Begley and N Donoher 0-1 each.	Referee: M Higgins (Armagh)

27 February 2011 Round 3	Donegal	0-08 - 1-05	Kildare	Letterkenny
	M Murphy 0-4 (4f), C McFadden 0-2 (2f), R Kavanagh, M Hegarty 0-1 each	Report	M Foley 1-0, F Dowling 0-2 (2f), E O'Flaherty, K Cribbin, E Callaghan 0-1 each	Referee: M Duffy (Sligo)

27 February 2011 Round 3	Sligo	0-15 - 2-15	Tyrone	Markievicz Park, Sligo
	A Marren 0-7 (4f), M Breheny (1f), S Davey, F Quinn 0-2 each, A Costello, S Coen 0-1 each	Report	S Cavanagh 1-5 (3f), M Penrose 0-4 (2f), S O'Neill 0-3, E McGinley 1-0, B McGuigan, O Mulligan, N McKenna 0-1 each	Referee: J McQuillan (Cavan)

12 March 2011 Round 4	Tyrone	1-16 - 1-11	Antrim	Omagh
	S Cavanagh 1-3 (0-1f), K Hughes 0-4, M Penrose 0-3 (3f), S O'Neill 0-2, D Harte, C Gormley, C Cavanagh, Joe McMahon 0-1 each	Report	T McCann 1-1 (0-1f), P Cunningham 0-5 (3f), K McGourty 0-2, T Scullion, K Niblock (1f), M Sweeney 0-1 each	Referee: C Branagan (Down)

13 March 2011 Round 4	Sligo	0-8 - 0-11	Derry	Markievicz Park, Sligo
	A Marren 0-5 (4f), M Breheny 0-2 (1f), D Rooney 0-1	Report	P Bradley 0-7 (3f), M Donaghy 0-2, E. Muldoon, PJ McCloskey 0-1 each	Referee: R O'Donnell (Donegal)

13 March 2011 Round 4	Meath	0-9 - 0-15	Donegal	Páirc Tailteann, Navan
	B Sheridan (2f), S O'Rourke (1f) 0-2 each, B Meade, N Crawford, J Sheridan ('45'), B Farrell (f), T Skelly 0-1 each.	Report	M Murphy 0-6 (2f), R Bradley, C McFadden (1f) 0-3 each, R Kavanagh 0-2, D Molloy 0-1	Referee: M Higgins (Fermanagh)

13 March 2011 Round 4	Kildare	1-13 - 1-11	Laois	Newbridge
	R Sweeney 0-4 (0-3fs), J Kavanagh 1-0, R Kelly, D Flynn, E O'Flaherty (0-2fs) 0-2 each, G White, K Cribbin, E Bolton 0-1 each	Report	R Sweeney 0-4 (0-3fs), J Kavanagh 1-0, R Kelly, D Flynn, E O'Flaherty (0-2fs) 0-2 each, G White, K Cribbin, E Bolton 0-1 each	Referee: J McQuillan (Cavan)

19 March 2011 Round 5	Laois	0-11 - 1-12	Tyrone	Portlaoise
	MJ Tierney 0-5 (5f), R Munnelly 0-2, C Begley, D Strong, B Sheehan, K Meaney 0-1 each.	Report	C Cavanagh 1-1, B McGuigan, S Cavanagh (3f) 0-3 each, M Penrose 0-2 (1f), K Hughes, O Mulligan, M Donnelly 0-1 each	Referee: M Collins (Cork)

19 March 2011 Round 5	Derry	2-12 - 2-18	Donegal	Celtic Park, Derry
	C O'Boyle 2-1, C Gilligan 0-6 (6f), G O'Kane 0-2, C McGoldrick, E. Muldoon, C Kielt 0-1 each.	Report	M Murphy 1-7 (6f), C McFadden 1-3, D Molly 0-5 (5f), K Lacey, R Kavanagh, M McElhinney 0-1.	Referee: P Hughes (Armagh)

20 March 2011 Round 5	Antrim	1-11 - 2-18	Sligo	Casement Park, Belfast
	P Cunningham 0-7 (5f), T McCann 1-0, K Brady 0-2, K Niblock, B Herron 0-1 each.	Report	M Breheny 0-6, B Curran 1-2, A Marren 0-4, E O'Hara 1-1, S Gilmartin (1 '45'), S Davey, A Costello, D Maye, T Taylor 0-1 each	Referee: M Sludden (Tyrone)

20 March 2011 Round 5	Kildare	1-14 - 1-12	Meath	Newbridge
	J Doyle 1-3 (3f), R Kelly 0-4, R Sweeney, E O'Flaherty (2f) 0-2 each, G White, J Kavanagh, P O'Neill 0-1 each	Report	S O'Rourke 1-1 (1f), C Ward 0-4 (4f), B Farrell, J Sheridan (1 '45') 0-2 each, P Gilsenan, S Kenny, P O'Rourke 0-1 each	Referee: M Duffy (Sligo)

3 April 2011 Round 6	Sligo	2-08 - 1-14	Laois	Markievicz Park, Sligo
	A Marren 2-4 (1-0 pen, 2f), A Costello 0-2, S Davey, E O'Hara 0-1 each	Report	M J Tierney 0-5 (2f), B Quigley 1-0, J O'Loughlin, D Strong, C Begley 0-2 each, G Kavanagh, R Munnelly, N Donoher 0-1 each	Referee: B Cassidy (Derry)

3 April 2011 Round 6	Tyrone	0-13 - 0-05	Kildare	Dungannon
	M Penrose 0-5 (4f), M Donnelly 0-3, B McGuigan 0-2, S Cavanagh, C Cavanagh, K Hughes 0-1 each	Report	J Doyle 0-4 (3f), R Sweeney 0-1	Referee: D Coldrick (Meath)

3 April 2011 Round 6	Donegal	1-17 - 0-08	Antrim	Ballyshannon
	C McFadden 1-5 (2f), M Murphy 0-3 (2f), K Cassidy, D Molloy (2f), M Hegarty 0-2 each, R Bradley, K Lacey, R Kavanagh 0-1 each	Report	T McCann 0-5 (3f), B Neeson 1-1 (1f), T O'Neill 0-2	Referee: M Duffy (Sligo)

3 April 2011 Round 6	Derry	1-18 - 3-08	Meath	Celtic Park, Derry
	P Bradley 0-7 (4f), S McGoldrick 1-1, C Gilligan 0-3 (1f, 1 '45), G O'Kane, M Donaghy 0-2 each, C Kielt, M Friel, M Lynch 0-1 each	Report	C Ward 1-5 (5f), J Sheridan 2-0, G Reilly 0-2, S O'Rourke 0-1 (f)	Referee: M Deegan (Laois)

10 April 2011 Round 7	Laois	1-15 - 1-11	Donegal	O'Moore Park, Portlaoise
	MJ Tierney 1-10 (9f, 1 '45), M Timmons, D Strong, P O'Leary, C Begley, J O'Loughlin 0-1 each	Report	D Molloy 1-1, C McFadden 0-3 (2f), M Murphy (1f), R Kavanagh, M McElhinney 0-2 each, A Thompson 0-1	Referee: M Higgins (Fermanagh)

10 April 2011 Round 7	Kildare	0-16 - 1-12	Sligo	Newbridge
	E Callaghan 0-4, F Dowling, E O'Flaherty (2f) 0-3 each, R Sweeney, H Lynch, B Flanagan, G White, P O'Neill, J Doyle 0-1 each	Report	S Coen 1-2, M Breheny (1f), A Marren (2f), D Maye (1f) 0-2 each, S Gilmartin, A Costello, E O'Hara, F Quinn 0-1 each	Referee: P O'Sullivan (Kerry)

10 April 2011 Round 7	Antrim	0-13 - 1-18	Derry	Casement Park, Belfast
	P Cunningham (3f), T McCann 0-4 each, A Gallagher 0-2, T O'Neill, M Dougan, M Armstrong 0-1 each	Report	C Gilligan 0-6 (4f), P Bradley 0-5, C O'Boyle 1-1, G O'Kane 0-3, M Lynch, M Bateson, E Bradley 0-1 each	Referee: P Hughes (Armagh)

10 April 2011 Round 7	Meath	0-17 - 1-14	Tyrone	Páirc Tailteann, Navan
	G Reilly 0-4, P O'Rourke, J Sheridan, C Ward (2f) 0-2 each, S O'Rourke, N Crawford, B Meade, S McAnarney, B Menton, B Farrell (f), P Gilsenan 0-1 each	Report	M Penrose 1-6 (1-3f), A Cassidy 0-2, B McGuigan, M Donnelly, S Cavanagh (f), C Cavanagh, Joe McMahon, C Gormley 0-1 each	Referee: D Fahy (Longford)

=== Final ===
24 April 2011
Final

Donegal	2-11 - 0-16	Laois
Michael Murphy (1-3), Colm McFadden (1-3), Kevin Cassidy (0-1), Rory Kavanagh (0-1), Mark McHugh (0-1), Ryan Bradley (0-1), D Walsh (0-1)	Report	Donie Kingston (0-4), Paul Cahillane (0-3), John O'Loughlin (0-2), Niall Donoher (0-2), Ross Munnelly (0-2), Darren Strong (0-1), Colm Begley (0-1), Michael John Tierney (0-1)

Croke Park, Dublin
Referee: Marty Duffy (Sligo)

== Division 3 ==
=== Table ===
Compete in Division 3 final and automatic promotion to Division 2 Automatic relegation to Division 4

Team	Pld	W	D	L	F	A	Diff	Pts
Westmeath	7	4	1	2	4-95	8-72	+1	9
Louth	7	4	0	3	7-75	3-77	+10	8
Wexford	7	4	0	3	6-85	8–74	+5	8
Offaly	7	4	0	3	7–80	5-82	+4	8
Cavan	7	3	1	3	3-81	6–78	-6	7
Tipperary	7	3	0	4	4–79	5–76	-1	6
Limerick	7	3	0	4	6–78	5–82	-1	6
Waterford	7	2	0	5	10-64	7–85	-12	4

- Louth, Wexford and Offaly are ranked by score difference.
- Tipperary were placed ahead of Limerick as they won the head-to-head match between the teams (6 February at Semple Stadium: 0-10 - 0-6).

=== Fixtures and results ===
6 February 2011 Round 1	Offaly	1-12 – 0-08	Cavan	O'Connor Park, Tullamore
	B Allen 1-4 (2f), C McManus 0-4 (3f), D Egan, A Sullivan, N McNamee (1f), J Reynolds 0-1 each.	Report	S Johnston (1f), G Pierson 0-2 each, R Flanagan (1f), M Brennan (1 '45'), B Fitzpatrick, M McKeever 0-1 each.	Referee: Eddie Kinsella (Laois)

6 February 2011 Round 1	Wexford	4-11 – 2-06	Waterford	Wexford Park
	B Brosnan 2-5 (0-2f), C Lyng 1-4 (0-1f), K O'Grady 1-0, B Malone, D Waters 0-1 each.	Report	P Hurney 1-2 (0-2f), T Prendergast 1-1, B Wall, S Briggs, B Phelan 0-1 each.	Referee: Gary McCormack (Dublin)

13 February 2011 Round 1	Louth	2-13 - 0-11	Westmeath	Drogheda
	S Lennon 1-7 (2f), D Maguire 1-0, A Reid 0-2, R Finnegan, P Keenan, A McDonnell, B Donnelly 0-1 each		Denis Glennon 0-3 (3f), C Lynam, D Dolan 0-2 each, J Heslin, P Greville (1f), F Wilson, David Glennon 0-1 each	Referee: Pat McEnaney (Monaghan

6 February 2011 Round 1	Tipperary	0-10 – 0-06	Limerick	Semple Stadium, Thurles
	P Acheson, B Grogan (2f), C Sweeney (1f) 0-2 each, B Jones, G Hannigan, P Austin, S Grogan 0-1 each.	Report	G Collins 0-5 (2f), J Galvin 0-1.	Referee: Syl Doyle (Wexford)

20 February 2011 Round 2	Waterford	2-08 - 0-08	Limerick	Dungarvan
	M Ferncombe 2-1, S Fleming, T Prendergast 0-2 each, E Walsh, W Hennessy, B Wall (f) 0-1 each	Report	G Collins 0-5 (3f), S Kelly 0-2, J Cooke 0-1	Referee: M Collins (Cork)

20 February 2011 Round 2	Westmeath	0-13 - 1-10	Cavan	Cusack Park, Mullingar
	D Dolan 0-4 (2f), P Greville (2f), J Heslin 0-2 each, Denis Glennon, F Wilson, G Egan, D Corroon 0-1 each	Report	S Johnston 1-3 (1f), G McKiernan 0-2, M McKeever, G Pearson, R Flanagan (1f), R Cullivan 0-1 each	Referee: M Sludden (Tyrone)

20 February 2011 Round 2	Louth	1-12 - 1-10	Tipperary	Drogheda
	S Lennon 1-5 (5f), M Brennan, P Keenan 0-2 each, G Hoey, R Finnegan, D Byrne 0-1 each	Report	B Grogan 1-4 (3f), C Sweeney 0-3 (2f), B Fox 0-2, J Cagney	Referee: D Brazil (Offaly)

20 February 2011 Round 2	Offaly	0-11 - 1-12	Wexford	O'Connor Park, Tullamore
	N McNamee 0-7 (3f, 1 '45'), B Allen 0-3 (3f), J Reynolds 0-1	Report	B Brosnan 0-4 (2f), R Quinlan 1-0, A Doyle 0-3, C Lyng 0-2 (1f, 1 '45'), B Malone, S O'Neill and S Roche 0-1 each.	Referee: D Fahy (Longford)

27 February 2011 Round 3	Wexford	0-11 - 1-12	Louth	Wexford Park, Wexford
				Referee: D Brazil

27 February 2011 Round 3	Tipperary	2-09 - 2-12	Westmeath	Semple Stadium, Thurles
				Referee: P O'Sullivan

27 February 2011 Round 3	Cavan	0-13 - 1-08	Waterford	Breffni Park, Cavan
				Referee: J Curley

27 February 2011 Round 3	Limerick	1-12 - 2-10	Offaly	Newcastlewest
				Referee: C Lane

12 March 2011 Round 4	Waterford	2-08 - 0-09	Tipperary	Dungarvan
	E Walsh, P Hurney 1-1 each, B Wall 0-4 (0-1f), S Fleming, Ml O'Gorman 0-1 each	Report	B Grogan 0-4 (2f, 1 '45'), B Fox 0-2, C Sweeney, GHannigan, H Coughlan 0-1 each.	Referee: M Meade (Limerick)

13 March 2011 Round 4	Limerick	2-14 - 0-15	Cavan	Gaelic Grounds, Limerick
	G Collins 0-5 (5f), I Ryan 0-4 (1f), P Ranahan, S Kelly 1-0 each, M Sheehan, E O'Connor, S Buckley, J Cooke, J Mullane 0-1 each	Report	G Smith (1f, 1'65'), S Johnston (3f) 0-3 each, M Cahill, C Mackey, E Keating 0-2 each, J McCutcheon, R Cullivan, D Givney 0-1 each.	Referee: M Collins (Cork)

13 March 2011 Round 4	Westmeath	1-07 - 0-13	Wexford	Cusack Park, Mullingar
	P Greville 1-1 (0-1f), D Glennon 0-3 (1f), C Lynam 0-2, F Wilson 0-1	Report	C Lyng 0-6 (2f), R Barry 0-3, L Óg McGovern, B Brosnan, A Doyle, B Malone 0-1 each	Referee: S McNamee (Tyrone)

13 March 2011 Round 4	Louth	0-11 - 1-09	Offaly	Drogheda
	B Donnelly 0-5 (0-3 '45's, 0-1f), S Lennon 0-4 (3f), JP Rooney, P Keenan 0-1 each	Report	N McNamee 1-2 (1-0 pen), C McManus (3f), J Reynolds 0-3 each, R Dalton 0-1	Referee: S Carroll (Westmeath)

20 March 2011 Round 5	Wexford	1-14 - 2-09	Cavan	Wexford Park, Wexford
	P Byrne 1-1, B Brosnan 0-6 (4f), C Lyng 0-3 (2f), A Morrissey, A Doyle, S O'Neill, R Barry 0-1 each	Report	M Lyng 2-0, R Flanagan 0-3 (2f), G Smith (2f), R Cullivan 0-2 each, C Mackey, S Johnston (f) 0-1 each	Referee: N Ward (Westmeath)

20 March 2011 Round 5	Westmeath	1-19 - 1-14	Waterford	Cusack Park, Mullingar
	D Dolan 0-10 (6f), P Greville 0-5 (5f), D Corroon 1-0, F Wilson 0-2, B Murtagh, C Jordan 0-1 each	Report	M Ferncombe 1-4 (3f), B Wall 0-5 (5f), T Prendergast 0-2, P Hurney, C O'Keeffe, K Cotter ('45') 0-1 each	Referee: E O'Grady (Leitrim)

20 March 2011 Round 5	Louth	1-11 - 1-14	Limerick	Drogheda
	S Lennon 1-3 (1f), JP Rooney 0-3, P Keenan, D Maguire 0-2 each, B Donnelly 0-1 (1 '45)	Report	P Ranahan 1-0, S Kelly, J Cooke 0-3 each, G Collins (1f), E O'Connor 0-2 each, J Riordan, T Lee, S Buckley, J Mullane 0-1 each	Referee: B Cassidy (Derry)

20 March 2011 Round 5	Offaly	0-13 - 1-11	Tipperary	O'Connor Park, Tullamore
	N McNamee 0-6 (2f), J Reynolds, C McManus (1f, 1 '45') 0-2 each, J Keane, K Casey, B Connor 0-1 each	Report	B Grogan 0-7 (4f), B Mulvihill 1-1, B Fox, J Cagney, P Austin 0-1 each	Referee: P O'Sullivan (Kerry)

2 April 2011 Round 6	Cavan	0-11 - 1-05	Louth	Breffni Park, Cavan
	G McKiernan, N McDermott (1f) 0-3 each, C Mackey 0-2 (2f), M McKeever, R Flanagan, S Johnston 0-1 each	Report	M Brennan 1-0, P Keenan, P Smith 0-2 each, E McAuley 0-1	Referee: G Walsh (Antrim)

3 April 2011 Round 6	Tipperary	0-17 - 0-10	Wexford	Clonmel
	B Grogan 0-9 (6f), P Austin 0-3, S Grogan, B Mulvihill 0-2 each, N Curran 0-1	Report	C Lyng (4f), B Brosnan (3f) 0-4 each, R Barry, A Doyle 0-1 each	Referee: R Maloney (Limerick)

3 April 2011 Round 6	Limerick	0-12 - 0-14	Westmeath	Newcastlewest
	G Collins 0-8 (7f), T Lee, S Buckley, J Kelly, J Riordan 0-1 each	Report	D Dolan 0-6 (5f), C Lynam, P Sharry, D Corroon 0-2 each, D Glennon, P Greville (f) 0-1 each	Referee: B Tyrell (Tipperary)

3 April 2011 Round 6	Waterford	2-19 - 1-19	Offaly	Dungarvan
	R Foley 0-9 (8f, 1 '65'), S Walsh 1-4, B O'Sullivan 1-2, S Prendergast, G Crotty, S O'Sullivan, K Moran 0-1 each	Report	S Dooley 0-12 (10f, 1 '65'), J Bergin 1-2, B Carroll 0-3, C Egan, C Parlon 0-1 each	Referee: J Ryan (Tipperary)

10 April 2011 Round 7	Cavan	0-16 - 0-13	Tipperary	Breffni Park, Cavan
	S Johnston 0-9 (5f), E Keating 0-3, K Fannin, R Flanagan, D Givney, G Smith 0-1 each	Report	B Grogan 0-5 (3f ), C Sweeney 0-3 (1f), B Coen, H Coghlan, B Mulvihill, P Austin, P Acheson 0-1 each.	Referee: C Branagan (Down)

10 April 2011 Round 7	Westmeath	0-19 - 2-11	Offaly	Cusack Park, Mullingar
	D Dolan 0-6, P Greville 0-5 (1f), D Corroon, P Sharry 0-2 each, C Lynam, David Glennon, Denis Glennon, F Wilson 0-1 each	Report	B Allen 2-0, C McManus 0-4 (3f), N McNamee 0-3, T Deehan 0-2 (1f), B Darby, J Reynolds 0-1 each	Referee: M Sludden (Tyrone)

10 April 2011 Round 7	Limerick	2-12 - 0-14	Wexford	Newcastlewest
	G Collins 1-2 (1-0 pen, 1f), S Buckley 1-1, E O'Connor 0-3, I Ryan, T Lee 0-2 each, S Lucey, J McCarthy 0-1 each	Report	C Lyng (2f), S Roche 0-3 each, R Barry, P Byrne, A Morrissey 0-2 each, A Doyle, R Quinlivan, 0-1 each	Referee: F Glennon (Leitrim)

10 April 2011 Round 7	Waterford	0-11 - 1-11	Louth	Dungarvan
	P Hurney 0-4, W Hennessy 0-2, M Ferncombe, T Grey, S Fleming, B Wall (1f), T Prendergast 0-1 each.	Report	R Carroll 1-2, P Keenan 0-5 (1f), D Maguire 0-2 (1f), D Clarke, R Finnegan 0-1 each	Referee: M Collins (Cork)

=== Final ===
23 April 2011

Louth	1-15 - 0-13	Westmeath
Carroll (1-3), Keenan (0-3, 2f), Donnelly (0-2), Maguire (0-2), Reid (0-1), R. Finnegan (0-1), McDonnell (0-1), Smith (0-1), Shevlin (0-1)	Report	Lynam (0-5, 1f) Greville (0-5, 1f) Denis Glennon (0-3)

Croke Park, Dublin
Referee: R. Hickey (Clare)

GK	1	Seán Connor (St Patrick's)
RCB	2	Eamonn McAuley (Na Piarsaigh)
FB	3	Aaron Hoey (St Bride's)
LCB	4	Gerard Hoey (Geraldines)
RHB	5	Ray Finnegan (St Patrick's)
CHB	6	Dessie Finnegan (St Patrick's)
LHB	7	Liam Shevlin (Dreadnots)
MF	8	Paddy Keenan (St Patrick's) (c)
MF	9	Brian Donnelly (Cooley Kickhams)
RHF	10	Derek Crilly (Dundalk Gaels)
CHF	11	Mark Brennan (Mattock Rangers)
LHF	12	Andy McDonnell (Newtown Blues)
RCF	13	Páraic Smith (Dreadnots)
FF	14	Ronan Carroll (St Mary's)
LCF	15	Adrian Reid (Mattock Rangers)
Substitutes:
	16	Jamie Carr (Newtown Blues) for Gerry Hoey
	17	Derek Maguire (Dundalk Young Irelands) for Brennan
	18	Stephen Fitzpatrick (Clan na Gael) for McAuley
	19	JP Rooney (Naomh Máirtín) for Smith

GK	1	Gary Connaughton (Tubberclair)
RCB	2	Francis Boyle (Killucan)
FB	3	Kieran Gavin (Mullingar Shamrocks)
LCB	4	John Gaffey (Garrycastle)
RHB	5	Ger Egan (Tyrrellspass)
CHB	6	Aidan Finnan (Bunbrosna)
LHB	7	Doran Harte (Garrycastle)
MF	8	Brendan Murtagh (The Downs)
MF	9	Denis Corroon (Mullingar Shamrocks)
RHF	10	Paul Sharry (St Loman's)
CHF	11	David Glennon (Tyrrellspass)
LHF	12	James Dolan (Garrycastle)
RCF	13	Paul Greville (Killucan)
FF	14	Conor Lynam (St Loman's)
LCF	15	Denis Glennon (Tyrrellspass) (c)
Substitutes:
	16	Kevin Maguire (Caulry) for Gaffey
	17	Kieran Martin (Maryland) for Finnan
	18	Simon Quinn (Mullingar Shamrocks) for Harte
	19	Micheál Curley (Mullingar Shamrocks) for Sharry

== Division 4 ==
=== Table ===
Compete in Division 4 final and automatic promotion to Division 3

Team	Pld	W	D	L	F	A	Diff	Pts
Roscommon	8	7	1	0	8-118	5-73	54	15
Longford	8	5	2	1	10-103	4–66	55	12
Wicklow	8	4	3	1	15–115	10–80	46	11
Fermanagh	8	4	0	4	3-100	5-54	29	8
Carlow	8	4	1	3	8–96	10–84	6	7
Clare	8	3	1	4	14–86	3–90	38	7
Leitrim	8	3	0	5	4–87	4–58	19	6
London	8	2	0	6	2–53	9-96	-66	4
Kilkenny	8	0	0	8	6-18	19–160	-181	0

- Carlow were placed ahead of Clare as they won the head-to-head match between the teams (27 February at Dr Cullen Park: 1-11 - 1-10).

=== Fixtures and results ===
6 February 2011 Round 1	London	0-16 – 0-02	Kilkenny	Ruislip
	N Tuohy (0-1), C McCallion (0-2); R Dempsey (0-2, 1 free), J Collins (0-2), E O'Neill (0-7, 4 frees), P McGoldrick (0-1), K Phair (0-1).	Report	G Lawlor (0-1, free), D Garvey (0-1).	Referee: Brian O'Shea (Dublin)

6 February 2011 Round 1	Leitrim	0-12 – 0-11	Clare	Páirc Seán Mac Diarmada
	W McKeon (0-1); R Mulvey (0-1), J Glancy (0-4 one free), A Croal (0-2), R Cox (0-1), C Beirne (0-3, frees).	Report	G Brennan (0-1 free), C O'Connor (0-1), D Tubridy (0-3 two frees), R Donnelly (0-2), A Clohessy (0-3 two frees), S Brennan (0-1).	Referee: Shaun McLaughlin (Donegal)

6 February 2011 Round 1	Longford	1-07 – 0-10	Roscommon	Pearse Park, Longford
	S McCormack 0-5 (3f), P Barden 1-0, B McElvaney (f), D Barden 0-1 each.	Report	J Rogers 0-4f, G Heneghan 0-2, S Ormsby, N Carty, K Higgins, C Shine 0-1 each.	Referee: Jerome Henry (Mayo)

6 February 2011 Round 1	Carlow	2-10 – 1-13	Wicklow	Dr Cullen Park
	D St Leger 0-4 (3f), C Mullins, T Walsh 1-0 each, JJ Smith 0-2, B Murphy, A Kelly, D Foley, A Curran 0-1 each.	Report	L Glynn 1-4, J McGrath (1f), J P Dalton 0-3 each, S Furlong 0-2 (1f), P Dalton 0-1.	Referee: Fergal Kelly (Longford)

12 February 2011 Round 2	London	0-07 - 1-14	Roscommon	Ruislip
	E O'Neill 0-3 (3f), J Collins 0-2, P McGoldrick, S Kelly 0-1 each	Report	S O'Grady 1-2, K Higgins 0-4, J Rogers (1f), G Heneghan 0-2 each, C Shine, C Cregg, D O'Gara, J Dunning 0-1 each	Referee: G McCormack (Dublin)

12 February 2011 Round 2	Clare	5-17 - 1-01	Kilkenny	Milltown
	C O'Connor 2-2, A Clohessy 1-7, S Brennan 2-0, D O'Brien 0-3, John Hayes 0-2, G Brennan, E Lyons, M O'Regan 0-1 each	Report	M Duggan 1-0, G Lawlor 0-1	Referee: G Lynch (Kerry)

13 February 2011 Round 2	Leitrim	1-10 - 1-15	Wicklow	Páirc Seán Mac Diarmada
	C Beirne 1-2, A Croal 0-4 (1f), D Sweeney 0-2, B McDonald, E Mulligan 0-1 (1f).	Report	S Furlong 0-6 (4f), D Hayden 1-1, J McGrath 0-5 (2f), L Glynn 0-2, C McGraynor 0-1.	Referee: E McHugh (Tyrone)

13 February 2011 Round 2	Carlow	0-06 - 1-10	Fermanagh	Dr Cullen Park
	D Foley 0-4 (3f), JJ Smith (1f), E Finnegan 0-1 each	Report	J Sherry 1-1, T O'Flanagan 0-3 (2f), T Corrigan (1f), P Ward 0-2 each B Mulrone, C O'Brien 0-1 each	Referee: D O'Mahoney (Tipperary)

19 February 2011 Round 3	Fermanagh	0-05 - 1-08	Longford	Brewster Park, Enniskillen
	T O'Flanagan 0-4 (4f), T Corrigan0-1	Report	N Mulligan 1-1, P Dowd, S McCormack 0-3 each, N Farrell 0-1	Referee: V Neary (Mayo)

20 February 2011 Round 3	Wicklow	2-22 - 1-04	London	Aughrim
	L Glynn 1-6 (1 pen, 2f), S Furlong 1-5 (1f), P Dalton, C Hyland, D Odlum 0-2 each, J McGrath, JP Dalton, P Earls, J Stafford, C McGraynor (1f) 0-1 each	Report	E O'Neill 1-0 (1pen), S Kelly 0-3, John Collins 0-1	Referee: B Tyrrell (Tipperary)

20 February 2011 Round 3	Roscommon	2-13 - 0-08	Carlow	Dr. Hyde Park, Roscommon
	M Finneran 1-2, C Shine 1-0, J Rogers (1f) and K Higgins 0-3 each, C Cregg 0-2, S Ormsby, J Dunning, D Ward 0-1 each	Report	JJ Smith 0-6 (5f); A Kelly 0-2.	Referee: R O'Donnell (Donegal)

20 February 2011 Round 3	Kilkenny	0-00 - 3-19	Leitrim	Ballyragget
		Report	E Mulligan 0-9 (6f), J Glancy, C Kelly 1-2 each, B Prior 1-1, C Sheridan 0-2, P Brennan, B McDonald, C Maguire 0-1 each.	Referee: C Costello (Offaly)

17 April 2011 Round 4	London	w/o - scr	Leitrim	Ruislip

27 February 2011 Round 4	Carlow	1-11 - 1-10	Clare	Dr Cullen Park, Carlow
				Referee: K O'Brien

27 February 2011 Round 4	Fermanagh	0-13 - 2-07	Wicklow	Brewster Park, Enniskillen
				Referee: C Reynolds

27 February 2011 Round 4	Longford	4-24 - 0-05	Kilkenny	Pearse Park, Longford
				Referee: D Maher

12 March 2011 Round 5	Clare	5-10 - 0-04	London	Cusack Park, Ennis
	D Tubridy 2-7 (0-5f), A Clohessy 2-1, G Brennan 1-0, L Healy, D Daly 0-1 each.	Report	E O'Neill 0-4 (4f).	Referee: R Maloney (Limerick)

13 March 2011 Round 5	Wicklow	2-09 - 1-12	Longford	Aughrim
	L Glynn 1-1, J Dalton 1-0, S Furlong (2f), A O'Malley 0-3 each, T Hannon 0-2 (1f)	P Kneel (Louth)	S McCormack 0-6 (4f), B McElvanney 1-1, P Barden 0-2, M Brady, D Barden, S Mulligan 0-1 each	Referee: Report

13 March 2011 Round 5	Roscommon	1-12 - 1-09	Fermanagh	Kiltoom
	J Rogers 1-5 (4f), G Heneghan, C Cregg 0-2 each, K Higgins, F Cregg, C Devaney 0-1 each	Report	P Ward 0-4 (1f), R Jones 1-1 (2f), C O'Brien 0-2, T McElroy, T Corrigan (1f) 0-1 each.	Referee: F Flynn (Leitrim)

13 March 2011 Round 5	Kilkenny	3-01 - 2-21	Carlow	Nowlan Park, Kilkenny
	M Saunders, D Prendergast, T Kehoe 1-0 each, T Maher 0-1	Report	S Gannon 1-8, D St Ledger 1-1 (1-0 pen, 1f), T Walsh 0-4, P Hickey 0-3, B Murphy 0-2 (1f), W Minchin, A Curran, A Murphy 0-1 each	Referee: P Daly (Westmeath)

5 March 2011 Round 6	London	0-08 - 1-15	Longford	Ruislip

20 March 2011 Round 6	Kilkenny	1-05 - 4-16	Wicklow	Castlecomer
	D Garvey 1-0, JJ Dunphy 0-2, M Saunders, P Donnelly, G Lawlor (f) 0-1 each	Report	S Furlong 1-7 (2f), T Hannon 3-0, P Cunningham, D Hayden 0-3 each, J Stafford, P McWalter, A O'Malley 0-1 each	Referee: M Rock (Clare)

20 March 2011 Round 6	Clare	1-10 - 0-16	Roscommon	Cusack Park, Ennis
	G Brennan 1-1, A Clohessy 0-4 (1f), C O'Connor, D Tubridy (1f) 0-2 each, N Browne 0-1	Report	D Shine 0-9 (7f), S Kilbride (1f), K Higgins, J Rogers 0-2 each. C Cregg 0-1	Referee: R McBrien (Leitrim)

20 March 2011 Round 6	Leitrim	0-11 - 0-10	Fermanagh	Páirc Seán Mac Diarmada, Carrick-on-Shannon
	E Mulligan 0-4 (4f), C Beirne 0-3 (1f), C Kelly, W McKeon 0-2 each.	Report	T O'Flanagan 0-3 (2f), H Brady, K Cosgrove, R Jones, C Quigley, M O'Brien, B Og Maguire, P Ward 0-1 each	Referee: V Neary (Mayo)

26 March 2011 Round 7	Kilkenny	1-03 - 1-22	Fermanagh	Jenkinstown
		Report

27 March 2011 Round 7	Leitrim	0-10 - 1-10	Carlow	Páirc Seán Mac Diarmada, Carrick-on-Shannon
	C Beirne (3f), A Croal 0-3 each, C Kelly, J Glancy (St Mary's), J Glancy (Glencar–Manorhamilton), W McKeon 0-1 each.	Report	D St Ledger 1-1 (1-0 pen), Brian Murphy 0-3 (1f), P Hickey 0-2, D Foley, S Gannon, T Walsh, E Ruth 0-1 each

27 March 2011 Round 7	Clare	1-07 - 0-08	Longford	Cusack Park, Ennis
	D Tubridy 0-6 (4f), G Brennan 1-1 (0-1f)	Report	S McCormack 0-6 (3f), N Mulligan, F McGee 0-1 each.	Referee: L Devaney (Mayo)

27 March 2011 Round 7	Wicklow	2-16 - 3-14	Roscommon	Aughrim
	S Furlong 1-8 (4f), A O'Malley 1-4 (1f), L Glynn 0-3, P Earls 0-1	Report	J Rogers 1-3 (2f), K Higgins 1-2, K Mannion 1-1, C Devaney, D Shine (2f, 1 '45') 0-3 each, S O'Grady 0-2	Referee: B O'Shea (Dublin)

3 April 2011 Round 8	Fermanagh	0-17 - 0-09	Clare	Brewster Park, Enniskillen
	D Kille 0-4, R Jones (2f), P Ward, J O'Flanagan 0-3 each; T O'Flanagan 0-2 (1f), C Quigley, S Quigley 0-1 each	Report	D Tubridy 0-7 (2f, 1'45'), A Clohessy, G Brennan 0-1 each.	Referee: S McNamee (Tyrone)

3 April 2011 Round 8	Longford	1-08 - 0-10	Leitrim	Pearse Park, Longford
	P Barden 1-2, P Dowd 0-2, B Kavanagh, J O'Shea, Sean McCormack, P Foy 0-1 each	Report	E Mulligan 0-3 (3f), A Croal, C Beirne (2f) 0-2 each, W McKeon, C Kelly, J Glancy 0-1 each	Referee: J Curley (Meath)

3 April 2011 Round 8	Roscommon	0-25 - 0-01	Kilkenny	Kiltoom
	J Rogers 0-11 (8f), T Kelly 0-5, K Mannion, J Connaughton, S O'Grady, K Higgins 0-2 each, P Garvey 0-1	Report	D Prendergast 0-1f	Referee: D Corcoran (Mayo)

3 April 2011 Round 8	Carlow	1-18 - 1-06	London	Dr Cullen Park, Carlow
	D St Ledger 0-6 (5f), D Foley (3f), B Murphy (3f) 0-4 each, C Mullins 1-0, S Gannon 0-2, A Murphy, J J Smith 0-1 each.	Report	L Gavaghan 1-1, E O'Neill 0-3, S Kelly (1f), N Tuohy 0-1 each.	Referee: S Carroll (Westmeath)

10 April 2011 Round 9	Longford	1-21 - 1-12	Carlow	Pearse Park, Longford
	S McCormack 0-7 (4f) P Barden 1-4, B Kavanagh 0-4, P Dowd 0-2, D McElligott, N Mulligan, N Farrell, J O'Shea 0-1 each.	Report	D St Ledger 0-5 (3f), JJ Smith 1-1, D Foley 0-2, P Cashin, T Walsh, C Mullins, S Gannon 0-1 each.	Referee: D O'Mahoney (Tipperary)

10 April 2011 Round 9	Wicklow	1-17 - 0-20	Clare	Aughrim

10 April 2011 Round 9	Roscommon	1-14 - 0-15	Leitrim	Dr. Hyde Park, Roscommon

10 April 2011 Round 9	Fermanagh	0-14 - 0-08	London	Brewster Park, Enniskillen

=== Final ===
23 April 2011
Final

Longford	2-11 - 1-08	Roscommon
	Report

Croke Park, Dublin

Preceded by 2010 National Football League	National Football League; 1926 – present	Succeeded by 2012 National Football League
