= 2025 Westmeath Senior Football Championship =

121st Westmeath Senior Football Championship
Tournament details
- County: Westmeath
- Province: Leinster
- Year: 2025
- Trophy: Flanagan Cup
- Sponsor: Shay Murtagh Precast
- Date: 25 July 2025 - 26 October 2025
- Teams: 12
- Defending champions: St Loman's

Winners
- Champions: The Downs (11th win)
- Manager: Dermot Power
- Captain: Luke Loughlin & Ian Martin

Runners-up
- Runners-up: Coralstown-Kinnegad
- Manager: Jack Cooney
- Captain: Darren Giles

Promotion/Relegation
- Relegated team(s): St Malachy's

Other
- Matches played: 36
- Website: Meath GAA

The 2025 Westmeath Senior Football Championship was the 121st edition of Westmeath GAA's premier club Gaelic football tournament for senior graded teams in County Westmeath, Ireland. The tournament consisted of 12 teams, with the winner going on to represent Westmeath in the Leinster Senior Club Football Championship. The championship started with a group-stage and then progressed to a knock-out stage.

St Loman's were the defending champions after they defeated The Downs on penalties in the 2024 final. It was their 2nd Senior title in a row and was their 8th title in 12 years.

Garrycastle won the 2024 Westmeath Intermediate Football Championship after defeating Milltown in the final to return straight back to the senior grade after being relegated in 2023.

St Malachy's were relegated after losing on penalties to Tang in a relegation play-off.

The Downs won their first senior championship since 2022 and their 11th in their history after they beat Coralstown-Kinnegad in the final.

== Team changes ==
The following teams have changed division since the 2024 championship season:

=== To S.F.C. ===
Promoted from 2024 Westmeath Intermediate Football Championship

- Garrycastle - (Intermediate Champions)

=== From S.F.C. ===
Relegated to 2025 Westmeath Intermediate Football Championship

- Shandonagh

== Participating teams ==
The teams that participated in the 2025 Westmeath S.F.C are:

| Club | Location | 2024 Championship Position | 2025 Championship Position |
|---|---|---|---|
| Athlone | Athlone | Quarter-Finalist | Non-Qualifier (Section A) |
| Caulry | Moate | Non-Qualifier (Section A) | Quarter-Finalist |
| Coralstown-Kinnegad | Kinnegad | Semi-Finalist | Runners-Up |
| Garrycastle | Athlone | 2024 I.F.C Champions | Quarter-Finalist |
| Killucan | Killucan and Rathwire | Non-Qualifier (Section B) | Non-Qualifier (Section B) |
| Moate All Whites | Moate | Non-Qualifier (Section B) | Non-Qualifier (Section B) |
| Mullingar Shamrocks | Mullingar | Quarter-Finalist | Semi-Finalist |
| St Loman's | Mullingar | Champions | Semi-Finalist |
| St Malachy's | Castletown Geoghegan | Non-Qualifier (Section B) | Relegated to 2026 I.F.C |
| Tang | Tang | Non-Qualifier (Section A) | Relegation Finalist |
| The Downs | Mullingar | Runners-Up | Champions |
| Tyrrellspass | Tyrrellspass | Semi-Finalist | Non-Qualifier (Section A) |

== Group stage ==
The competition is split into two sections, based on their performance in the 2024 group stages. Section A consists of the teams who reached at least the Quarter-Finals last year. Section B consists of the two bottom placed finishers in Section A the previous year as well as the 3rd and 4th placed teams in Section B the previous year, the 2024 Relegation Play-off winners and the 2024 I.F.C champions.

The top two teams in Section A advance straight to the Semi-Finals, while the 3rd and 4th-place finishers in Section A and the 1st and 2nd-placed finishers in Section B advance to the Quarter-Finals. The last place team in Section B is relegated to the 2026 I.F.C unless 2 teams finish bottom on points, where a relegation play-off will decide to will stay in the S.F.C

=== Section A ===
Advance to Semi-Finals Advance to Quarter-Finals

| Team | Matches | | | | Score | | | Pts |
| Team | Pld | W | D | L | For | Against | Diff | Pts |
|---|---|---|---|---|---|---|---|---|
| The Downs | 5 | 5 | 0 | 0 | 111 | 49 | +62 | 10 |
| St Loman's | 5 | 2 | 1 | 2 | 93 | 81 | +12 | 5 |
| Mullingar Shamrocks | 5 | 2 | 0 | 3 | 88 | 97 | -9 | 4 |
| Coralstown-Kinnegad | 5 | 2 | 0 | 3 | 81 | 95 | -14 | 4 |
| Tyrrellspass | 5 | 2 | 0 | 3 | 63 | 99 | -36 | 4 |
| Athlone | 5 | 1 | 1 | 3 | 79 | 94 | -15 | 3 |

==== Round 1 ====
| 26 July 2025 Round 1 | St Loman's | 0-16 (16) – (16) 0-16 | Athlone | Mullingar |
| 17:00 IST (UTC+1) | | | | Venue: TEG Cusack Park |
| | | Report |

| 26 July 2025 Round 1 | Mullingar Shamrocks | 3-16 (25) – (14) 0-14 | Tyrrellspass | Rochfortbridge |
| 19:00 IST (UTC+1) |
| | | Report |

| 26 July 2025 Round 1 | The Downs | 3-13 (22) – (10) 0-10 | Coralstown-Kinnegad | Mullingar |
| 19:00 IST (UTC+1) | | | | Venue: TEG Cusack Park |
| | | Report |

==== Round 2 ====
| 9 August 2025 Round 2 | Athlone | 1-17 (20) – (15) 1-12 | Mullingar Shamrocks | Tang |
| 19:00 IST (UTC+1) |
| | | Report |

| 9 August 2025 Round 2 | Tyrrellspass | 0-07 (7) – (24) 4-12 | The Downs | Mullingar |
| 19:00 IST (UTC+1) | | | | Venue: TEG Cusack Park |
| | | Report |

| 10 August 2025 Round 2 | Coralstown-Kinnegad | 0-11 (11) – (20) 1-17 | St Loman's | Mullingar |
| 17:45 IST (UTC+1) | | | | Venue: TEG Cusack Park |
| | | Report |

==== Round 3 ====
| 23 August 2025 Round 3 | Athlone | 0-15 (15) – (17) 1-14 | Tyrrellspass | Ballynacargy |
| 19:00 IST (UTC+1) |
| | | Report |

| 24 August 2025 Round 3 | Coralstown-Kinnegad | 3-20 (29) – (19) 2-13 | Mullingar Shamrocks | Mullingar |
| 16:45 IST (UTC+1) | | | | Venue: TEG Cusack Park |
| | | Report |

| 24 August 2025 Round 3 | St Loman's | 1-10 (13) – (25) 3-16 | The Downs | Mullingar |
| 18:00 IST (UTC+1) | | | | Venue: TEG Cusack Park |
| | | Report |

==== Round 4 ====
| 7 September 2025 Round 4 | The Downs | 2-19 (25) – (10) 0-10 | Athlone | Rochfortbridge |
| 15:00 IST (UTC+1) |

| 7 September 2025 Round 4 | Tyrrellspass | 1-13 (16) – (10) 0-10 | Coralstown-Kinnegad | Mullingar |
| 16:15 IST (UTC+1) | | | | Venue: TEG Cusack Park |
| | | Report |

| 7 September 2025 Round 4 | Mullingar Shamrocks | 2-14 (20) – (19) 1-16 | St Loman's | Mullingar |
| 18:00 IST (UTC+1) | | | | Venue: TEG Cusack Park |
| | | Report |

==== Round 5 ====
| 20 September 2025 Round 5 | Coralstown-Kinnegad | 0-21 (21) – (18) 2-12 | Athlone | Moate |
| 17:30 IST (UTC+1) |
| | | Report |

| 20 September 2025 Round 5 | St Loman's | 3-16 (25) – (9) 1-06 | Tyrrellspass | Castletown Geoghegan |
| 17:30 IST (UTC+1) |

| 20 September 2025 Round 5 | The Downs | 0-15 (15) – (9) 1-06 | Mullingar Shamrocks | Mullingar |
| 17:30 IST (UTC+1) | | | | Venue: TEG Cusack Park |
| | | Report |

=== Section B ===
Advance to Quarter-Finals Advance to relegation play-off

| Team | Matches | | | | Score | | | Pts |
| Team | Pld | W | D | L | For | Against | Diff | Pts |
|---|---|---|---|---|---|---|---|---|
| Garrycastle | 5 | 4 | 0 | 1 | 106 | 77 | +29 | 8 |
| Caulry | 5 | 3 | 0 | 2 | 95 | 92 | +3 | 6 |
| Killucan | 5 | 3 | 0 | 2 | 90 | 81 | +9 | 6 |
| Moate All Whites | 5 | 3 | 0 | 2 | 91 | 89 | +2 | 6 |
| Tang | 5 | 1 | 0 | 4 | 80 | 96 | --16 | 2 |
| St Malachy's | 1 | 0 | 0 | 4 | 82 | 109 | -27 | 2 |

==== Round 1 ====
| 25 July 2025 Round 1 | Caulry | 2-09 (15) – (17) 0-17 | Killucan | Tyrrellspass |
| 19:15 IST (UTC+1) |
| | | Report |

| 25 July 2025 Round 1 | Garrycastle | 1-13 (16) – (15) 0-15 | Moate All Whites | Tubberclare |
| 19:15 IST (UTC+1) |
| | | Report |

| 26 July 2025 Round 1 | Tang | 1-13 (16) – (20) 2-14 | St Malachy's | Tyrrellspass |
| 19:00 IST (UTC+1) |
| | | Report |

==== Round 2 ====
| 8 August 2025 Round 2 | Moate All Whites | 2-11 (17) – (14) 0-14 | Tang | Tubberclare |
| 20:00 IST (UTC+1) |
| | | Report |

| 9 August 2025 Round 2 | Killucan | 2-06 (12) – (16) 1-13 | Garrycastle | Mullingar |
| 17:15 IST (UTC+1) | | | | Venue: TEG Cusack Park |
| | | Report |

| 9 August 2025 Round 2 | St Malachy's | 2-12 (18) – (19) 2-13 | Caulry | Moate |
| 19:00 IST (UTC+1) |
| | | Report |

==== Round 3 ====
| 23 August 2025 Round 3 | Killucan | 0-18 (18) – (24) 1-21 | Moate All Whites | Mullingar |
| 19:00 IST (UTC+1) | | | | Venue: TEG Cusack Park |
| | | Report |

| 24 August 2025 Round 3 | Caulry | 2-16 (22) – (16) 1-13 | Tang | Moate |
| 14:00 IST (UTC+1) |
| | | Report |

| 24 August 2025 Round 3 | St Malachy's | 0-14 (14) – (30) 4-18 | Garrycastle | Moate |
| 15:30 IST (UTC+1) |
| | | Report |

==== Round 4 ====
| 6 September 2025 Round 4 | Garrycastle | 2-19 (25) – (15) 0-15 | Caulry | Mullingar |
| 16:30 IST (UTC+1) | | | | Venue: TEG Cusack Park |

| 6 September 2025 Round 4 | Moate All Whites | 3-10 (19) – (17) 0-17 | St Malachy's | Mullingar |
| 18:15 IST (UTC+1) | | | | Venue: TEG Cusack Park |
| | | Report |

| 7 September 2025 Round 4 | Tang | 1-10 (13) – (18) 4-06 | Killucan | Rochfortbridge |
| 13:30 IST (UTC+1) |
| | | Report |

==== Round 5 ====
| 21 September 2025 Round 5 | Caulry | 2-18 (24) – (16) 1-13 | Moate All Whites | Mullingar |
| 17:15 IST (UTC+1) | | | | Venue: TEG Cusack Park |
| | | Report |

| 21 September 2025 Round 5 | St Malachy's | 1-10 (13) – (25) 1-22 | Killucan | Rochfortbridge |
| 17:15 IST (UTC+1) |
| | | Report |

| 21 September 2025 Round 5 | Tang | 1-18 (21) – (19) 1-16 | Garrycastle | Newtowncashel |
| 17:15 IST (UTC+1) | | | | Venue: Páirc Chiaran |
| | | Report |

== Relegation play-off ==
| 28 September 2025 Relegation Play-Off | Tang | 1-17 (20) – (20) 0-20 (a.e.t.) (3 - 1 pen) | St Malachy's | Ballymore |
| 15:00 IST (UTC+1) | | | | Venue: Páirc Chiaran |
| | | Report |
| | | Penalty shootout |

== Knock-out stage ==
Quarter-finals
28 September, Kinnegad
Coralstown-Kinnegad | 1-17
Caulry | 0-15
27 September, Mullingar
Mullingar Shamrocks | 2-16
Garrycastle | 1-17

Semi-finals
11 October, Mullingar
Coralstown-Kinnegad | 1-20
St Loman's | 1-16
12 October, Mullingar
Mullingar Shamrocks | 1-09
The Downs | 1-20

Final
26 October, Mullingar
Coralstown-Kinnegad | 1-15
The Downs | 4-12

=== Quarter-finals ===
| 27 September 2025 Quarter-Finals | Mullingar Shamrocks | 2-16 (22) – (20) 1-17 | Garrycastle | Mullingar |
| 16:15 IST (UTC+1) |
| | | Report |

| 28 September 2025 Quarter-Finals | Coralstown-Kinnegad | 1-17 (20) – (15) 0-15 | Caulry | Kinnegad |
| 16:15 IST (UTC+1) |
| | | Report |

=== Semi-finals ===
| 11 October 2025 Semi-Finals | Coralstown-Kinnegad | 1-20 (23) – (19) 1-16 | St Loman's | Mullingar |
| 15:45 IST (UTC+1) | | | | Venue: TEG Cusack Park |
| | | Report |

| 12 October 2025 Semi-Finals | Mullingar Shamrocks | 1-09 (12) – (23) 1-20 | The Downs | Mullingar |
| 15:45 IST (UTC+1) | | | | Venue: TEG Cusack Park |
| | | Report |

=== Final ===
| 26 October 2025 Final | Coralstown-Kinnegad | 1-15 (18) – (24) 4-12 | The Downs | Mullingar |
| 15:15 IST (UTC+1) | | | | Venue: TEG Cusack Park |
| | | Report |
