= 2018 Westmeath Senior Football Championship =

Westmeath S.F.C.
- Season: 2018
- Champions: Mullingar Shamrocks (12th S.F.C. Title)
- Relegated: Maryland
- Winning Manager: Ned Moore

The 2018 Westmeath Senior Football Championship is the 114th edition of the Westmeath GAA's premier club Gaelic football tournament for senior graded teams in County Westmeath, Ireland. The tournament consists of 12 teams, with the winner going on to represent Westmeath in the Leinster Senior Club Football Championship. The championship starts with a seeded group stage and then progresses to a knock out stage.

St. Loman's Mullingar were the defending champions for the third season running after defeating Tyrrellspass in the previous years final to complete a "3-in-a-row" of titles. However their reign as champions ended in this year's final.

This was St. Mary's Rochfortbridge's return to the senior grade after an 11 year exodus since relegation in 2006 when claiming the 2017 Westmeath Intermediate Football Championship title.

On 21 October 2018, Mullingar Shamrocks claimed their 12th S.F.C. title and dethroned their town rivals St. Loman's by defeating them by 2-12 to 1-11 in the final at Cusack Park. This was their first triumph since 2012.

Maryland was relegated to the I.F.C. for 2019 when finishing pointless at the bottom of Group B. This ended their 10 year stay in the top-flight of Westmeath club football.

== Team changes ==
The following teams have changed division since the 2017 championship season.

=== To S.F.C. ===
Promoted from 2017 I.F.C.

- St. Mary's Rochfortbridge - (Intermediate Champions)

=== From S.F.C. ===
Relegated to 2018 I.F.C.

- Caulry

== Group stage ==
All 12 teams enter the competition at this stage.

The competition was split into two groups, based on their performance in the 2017 Group stages. Group A consists of teams who reached the Quarter-Finals last year or better. Group B consists of two bottom placed finishers in Group 1 last year as well as 3rd and 4th placed in Group 2 last year, the 2017 Relegation Playoff winners and the 2017 Intermediate champions.

The top 2 teams in Group A go into the Semi-Finals, where they await the winners of the Quarter-Finals, which are composed of the 3rd and 4th placed teams in Group A along with the top 2 finishers in Group B. The bottom side in Group B will be relegated to the I.F.C. for 2019, however should 2 teams finish on level points at the bottom of Group 2, then a Relegation Playoff will be conducted involving those two teams.

=== Group A ===
Team	Pld	W	L	D	PF	PA	PD	Pts
Tyrrellspass	5	5	0	0	83	58	+25	10
St. Loman's Mullingar	5	4	1	0	89	63	+26	8
The Downs	5	3	2	0	83	73	+10	6
Athlone	5	2	3	0	81	66	+15	4
Killucan	5	1	4	0	41	90	−49	2
Coralstown/Kinnegad	5	0	5	0	48	75	−27	0

Round 1:

- Athlone 4-5, 0-8 Coralstown/Kinnegad, 21/7/2018,
- St. Loman's 3-17, 0-17 The Downs, 22/7/2018,
- Tyrrellspass 0-14, 0-9 Killucan, 22/7/2018,

Round 2:

- Tyrrellspass 1-19, 0-12 Coralstown/Kinnegad, 4/8/2018,
- The Downs 2-15, 0-8 Killucan, 5/8/2018,
- St. Loman's 2-9, 1-10 Athlone, 5/8/2018,

Round 3:

- The Downs 1-9, 0-10 Coralstown/Kinnegad, 17/8/2018,
- Tyrrellspass 2-8, 1-10 Athlone, 18/8/2018,
- St. Loman's 2-15, 0-6 Killucan, 18/8/2018,

Round 4:

- Killucan 1-7, 0-7 Coralstown/Kinnegad, 7/9/2018,
- Tyrrellspass 0-16, 1-10 St. Loman's, 8/9/2018,
- The Downs 3-12, 0-12 Athlone, 8/9/2018,

Round 5:

- Tyrrellspass 3-8, 0-12 The Downs, 15/9/2018,
- Athlone 5-11, 0-8 Killucan, 15/9/2018,
- St. Loman's 2-8, 2-5 Coralstown/Kinnegad, 15/9/2018,

=== Group B ===
Team	Pld	W	L	D	PF	PA	PD	Pts
Garrycastle	5	4	0	1	95	63	+32	9
Mullingar Shamrocks	5	4	1	0	78	61	+17	8
Rosemount	5	2	1	2	65	60	+5	6
Castledaly	5	1	2	2	75	77	−2	4
St. Mary's Rochfortbridge	5	1	3	1	70	75	−5	3
Maryland	5	0	5	0	64	111	−47	0

Round 1:

- Garrycastle 1-13, 1-10 Rochfortbridge, 21/7/2018,
- Mullingar Shamrocks 0-18, 2-7 Castledaly, 21/7/2018,
- Rosemount 1-15, 1-9 Maryland, 21/7/2018,

Round 2:

- Rochfortbridge 2-18, 1-12 Maryland, 3/8/2018,
- Rosemount 2-9, 1-12 Castledaly, 3/8/2018,
- Garrycastle 1-13, 2-8 Mullingar Shamrocks, 4/8/2018,

Round 3:

- Rosemount 1-8, 0-9 Rochfortbridge, 18/8/2018,
- Garrycastle 1-15, 0-12 Castledaly, 19/8/2018,
- Mullingar Shamrocks 1-13, 2-7 Maryland, 19/8/2018,

Round 4:

- Castledaly 1-18, 2-6 Maryland, 8/9/2018,
- Mullingar Shamrocks 1-16, 0-10 Rochfortbridge, 8/9/2018,
- Garrycastle 1-10, 1-10 Rosemount, 9/9/2018,

Round 5:

- Garrycastle 4-20, 2-5 Maryland, 16/9/2018,
- Castledaly 1-11, 1-11 Rochfortbridge, 16/9/2018,
- Mullingar Shamrocks 0-11, 0-9 Rosemount, 16/9/2018,

== Relegation final ==
Should two teams finish bottom Group B and on level points then a Relegation Final will be conducted between the implicated clubs. Since this was not the case with St. Mary's Rochfortbridge and Maryland garnering 3 and 0 points throughout their group campaigns, Maryland were relegated.

== Finals ==
=== Quarter-finals ===
23 September 2018; Quarter-Final	Garrycastle	0-14 - 0-7	Athlone	Cusack Park, Mullingar

23 September 2018; Quarter-Final	Mullingar Shamrocks	2-8 - 0-8	The Downs	Cusack Park, Mullingar

=== Semi-finals ===
7 October 2018; Semi-Final	St. Loman's Mullingar	2-10 - 0-12	Garrycastle	Cusack Park, Mullingar

7 October 2018; Semi-Final	Mullingar Shamrocks	0-10 - 0-9	Tyrrellspass	Cusack Park, Mullingar

== Final ==
21 October 2018; Final	Mullingar Shamrocks	2-12 - 1-11	St. Loman's Mullingar	Cusack Park, Mullingar
