= 2016 Westmeath Senior Football Championship =

Westmeath S.F.C.
- Season: 2016
- Champions: St. Loman's Mullingar (6th title)
- All Ireland SCFC: n/a
- Winning Captain: John Heslin
- Man of the Match: Shane Dempsey
- Winning Manager: Luke Dempsey
- Leinster SCFC: ???
- Matches: 56

The 2016 Westmeath Senior Football Championship is the 112th edition of the Westmeath GAA's premier club Gaelic football tournament for senior graded teams in County Westmeath, Ireland. The tournament consists of 12 teams, with the winner going on to represent Westmeath in the Leinster Senior Club Football Championship. The championship starts with a group stage and then progresses to a knock out stage.

St. Loman's Mullingar were the defending champions after they defeated Castledaly in the previous years final.

This was Athlone's return to the senior grade after claiming the 2015 Westmeath Intermediate Football Championship title. The county's most successful club made the straight bounce back up from the middle after being relegated for the first time in their history in 2014.

St. Malachy's were relegated to the I.F.C. for 2017 after three seasons in the top flight of Westmeath football.

== Team changes ==
The following teams have changed division since the 2015 championship season.

=== To S.F.C. ===
Promoted from I.F.C.

- Athlone – (Intermediate Champions)

=== From S.F.C. ===
Relegated to I.F.C.

- Bunbrosna

== Group stage ==
There are 2 groups called Group A and B. The top finisher in each group qualify for the Semi-finals directly. The second and the third-placed finishers in both groups will qualify for the Quarter-finals. The bottom finisher in each group will qualify for the Relegation Final.

=== Group A ===
Team	Pld	W	L	D	PF	PA	PD	Pts
Killucan	5	4	0	1	83	73	+10	9
Mullingar Shamrocks	5	3	1	1	76	57	+19	7
Garrycastle	5	2	3	0	72	68	+4	4 (Note: Playoff for quarter-finals)
The Downs	5	2	3	0	74	65	+9	4
Castledaly	5	2	3	0	60	78	−18	4
Maryland	5	1	4	0	56	80	−24	2

Notes:

Round 1

- Garrycastle 0-14, 1-4 Castledaly, 16/4/2016,
- Killucan 2-11, 2-10 Maryland, 16/4/2016,
- The Downs 1-6, 0-5 Mullingar Shamrocks, 17/4/2016,

Round 2

- Mullingar Shamrocks 1-17, 0-8 Castledaly, 14/5/2016,
- Killucan 3-9, 1-12 Garrycastle, 15/5/2016,
- Maryland 1-9, 0-10 The Downs, 15/5/2016,

Round 3

- Killucan 4-7, 1-16 Mullingar Shamrocks, 10/9/2016,
- Garrycastle 2-10, 0-4 Maryland, 11/9/2016,
- Castledaly 2-11, 1-13 The Downs, 11/9/2016,

Round 4

- Killucan 3-6, 0-10 Castledaly, 13/8/2016,
- The Downs 5-11, 2-11 Garrycastle, 13/8/2016,
- Mullingar Shamrocks 0-19, 1-8 Maryland, 13/8/2016,

Round 5

- Killucan 1-11, 1-10 The Downs, 27/8/2016,
- Mullingar Shamrocks 0-13, 0-10, 28/8/2016,
- Castledaly 1-15, 1-10 Maryland, 28/8/2016,

Quarter-final playoffs:

- Garrycastle 1-17, 0-10 Castledaly, 17/9/2016,
- Garrycastle 4-11, 0-9 The Downs, 25/9/2016,

=== Group B ===
Team	Pld	W	L	D	PF	PA	PD	Pts
Tyrrellspass	5	4	1	0	89	58	+31	8
St. Loman's Mullingar	5	4	1	0	106	66	+40	8
Athlone	5	3	2	0	82	69	+13	6
Caulry	5	2	3	0	55	75	−20	4
Coralstown/Kinnegad	5	1	4	0	54	97	−43	2
St. Malachy's	5	1	4	0	61	82	−21	2

Round 1

- Athlone 0-13, 1-9 St. Malachy's, 17/4/2016,
- Tyrrellspass 1-13, 0-13 St. Loman's Mullingar, 17/4/2016,
- Caulry 0-11, 1-6 Coralstown/Kinnegad, 17/4/2016,

Round 2

- Athlone 2-10, 1-10 Tyrrellspass, 14/5/2016,
- St. Malachy's 2-10, 0-7 Caulry, 14/5/2016,
- St. Loman's Mullingar 3-19, 1-7 Coralstown/Kinnegad, 15/05/2016

Round 3

- Athlone 3-19, 0-10 Coralstown/Kinnegad, 10/9/2016,
- St. Loman's Mullingar 2-12, 0-11 Caulry, 10/9/2016,
- Tyrrellspass 2-14, 0-7 St. Malachy's, 10/9/2016,

Round 4

- Coralstown/Kinnegad 2-8, 0-10 St. Malachy's, 13/8/2016,
- St. Loman's Mullingar 0-19, 0-13 Athlone, 14/8/2016,
- Tyrrellspass 0-20, 2-5 Caulry, 14/8/2016,

Round 5

- Tyrrellspass 3-11, 1-8 Coralstown/Kinnegad, 26/8/2016,
- Caulry 0-15, 1-9 Athlone, 28/8/2016,
- St. Loman's Mullingar 4-16, 2-10 St. Malachy's, 28/8/2016,

== Knock-out stages ==
=== Relegation final ===
The bottom finisher from both groups qualifies for the Relegation final. The loser will be relegated to the 2017 Intermediate Championship.

- Maryland 1-9, 0-11 St. Malachy's, Tubberclair, 23/9/2016,

=== Finals ===
There are 2 groups called Group A and B. The top finisher in each group qualify for the Semi-finals directly. The second and the third-placed finishers in both groups will qualify for the Quarter-finals.

Quarter-finals
St. Loman's Mullingar	2-13
Garrycastle	1-8
Mullingar Shamrocks	1-7; 1-10
Athlone	1-7; 2-9

Semi-finals
Killucan	0-12
St. Loman's Mullingar	2-14
Tyrrellspass	1-8
Athlone	1-6

Final
St. Loman's Mullingar	1-13
Tyrrellspass	0-10

Quarter-finals:

- St. Loman's Mullingar 2-13, 1-8 Garrycastle, Cusack Park, 1/10/2016,
- Athlone 1-7, 1-7 Mullingar Shamrocks, Cusack Park, 1/10/2016,
- Athlone 2-9, 1-10 Mullingar Shamrocks, Tubberclair, 5/10/2016

Semi-finals:

- St. Loman's Mullingar 2-14, 0-12 Killucan, Cusack Park, 16/10/2016,
- Tyrrellspass 1-8, 1-6 Athlone, Cusack Park, 16/10/2016,

30 October 2016; Final	St. Loman's Mullingar	1-13 – 0-10	Tyrrellspass	Cusack Park, Mullingar; Attendance: 5,772; Referee: Jim Rock (Coralstown/Kinnegad); Man of the Match: Shane Dempsey
30 October 2016; Final	Shane Dempsey 0-7, John Heslin 0-4 (0-3f), Ciaran Kilmurray 1-0, Kelvin Reilly and Paul Sharry 0-1 each	Report	Ger Egan 0-7 (0-5f), Aaron O'Brien 0-2, David Glennon 0-1	Cusack Park, Mullingar; Attendance: 5,772; Referee: Jim Rock (Coralstown/Kinnegad); Man of the Match: Shane Dempsey
