= 2017 Westmeath Senior Football Championship =

Westmeath S.F.C.
- Season: 2017
- Champions: St. Loman's Mullingar (7th title)
- Relegated: Caulry
- Winning Captain: John Heslin
- Man of the Match: John Heslin
- Winning Manager: Luke Dempsey
- Matches: 56

The 2017 Westmeath Senior Football Championship is the 113th edition of the Westmeath GAA's premier club Gaelic football tournament for senior graded teams in County Westmeath, Ireland. The tournament consists of 12 teams, with the winner going on to represent Westmeath in the Leinster Senior Club Football Championship. The championship starts with a group stage and then progresses to a knock out stage.

St. Loman's Mullingar were the defending champions after they defeated Tyrrellspass in the previous years final to complete a "2-in-a-row" of titles.

This was Rosemount's return to the senior grade after a 17-year exodus when claiming the 2016 Westmeath Intermediate Football Championship title.

== Team changes ==
The following teams have changed division since the 2016 championship season.

=== To S.F.C. ===
Promoted from 2016 Westmeath Intermediate Football Championship

- Rosemount - (Intermediate Champions)

=== From S.F.C. ===
Relegated to 2017 Westmeath Intermediate Football Championship

- St. Malachy's

== Group stage ==
All 12 teams enter the competition at this stage.

The competition split into two groups, based on their performance in the 2016 Group stages. Group 1 consists of teams who reached the Quarter-finals last year or better. Group 2 consists of two bottom placed finishers in Group 1 last year as well as 3rd and 4th placed in Group 2 last year, the 2016 Relegation Playoff winners and the 2016 Intermediate champions.

The top 2 teams in Group 1 go into the Semi-finals, where they await the winners of the Quarter-finals, which are composed of the 3rd and 4th placed teams in Group 1 along with the top 2 finishers in Group 2. The bottom 2 teams in Group 2 will enter a Relegation Playoff.

Caulry were defeated in the Relegation Play-off, and hence were relegated to the 2018 I.F.C. after three seasons in the top flight.

=== Group A ===
Team	Pld	W	L	D	PF	PA	PD	Pts
St. Loman's Mullingar	5	4	0	1	124	62	+62	9
Tyrrellspass	5	2	1	2	60	74	−14	6
Killucan	5	2	2	1	59	79	−20	5
Athlone	5	2	2	1	75	83	−8	5
Mullingar Shamrocks	5	1	2	2	69	77	−8	4
Garrycastle	5	0	4	1	63	78	−15	1

==== Round 1 ====
7/23/17; 17:30	Killucan	1-14 - 0-15	Athlone	Hogan Park, Moate; Referee: Niall Ward (Garrycastle); Man of the Match: Paul Greville
7/23/17; 17:30	Paul Greville 0-8 (0-3f), Killian Doyle 1-1, Ciaran Doyle 0-2, Tony Doyle, Jason Gorman, Luke Tormey 0-1 each		Ryan Gaffey (0-2f), Mickey Greene, John Connellan 0-3 each, Noel Mulligan, Alan Gaughan, John Egan 0-2 each	Hogan Park, Moate; Referee: Niall Ward (Garrycastle); Man of the Match: Paul Greville

7/23/17; 19:00	Tyrrellspass	2-9 - 1-11	Garrycastle	Hogan Park, Moate; Referee: Pat Fox (Rosemount); Man of the Match: Jamie Gonoud
7/23/17; 19:00	Kieran Geraghty 1-3 (0-2f), David Glennon 1-1, David Jessop, Conor Slevin (0-1f), Denis Glennon, Ben Gavin, Philip Sheridan 0-1 each		James Sheerin 1-1, Tom O'Halloran 0-3, Jonathan McGuire 0-2, Gary McCallon, Matthew Guiheen, Conor Cosgrove (0-1f), Michael Monaghan, Alex Gardiner 0-1 each	Hogan Park, Moate; Referee: Pat Fox (Rosemount); Man of the Match: Jamie Gonoud

7/23/17; 19:00	St. Loman's Mullingar	0-19 - 3-10	Mullingar Shamrocks	Cusack Park, Mullingar; Referee: Declan Nugent (Maryland); Man of the Match: John Heslin
7/23/17; 19:00	John Heslin 0-8 (0-4f), Ronan O'Toole 0-3, Ken Casey and Shane Dempsey 0-2 each, David Whelan, Ciaran Kilmurray, Fola Ayorinde, Billy O'Loughlin 0-1 each		Denis Corroon 0-5 (0-3f), Donal O'Donoghue 1-1, Kieran Gavin and Seanie Daly (1-0 pen) 1-0 each, Tye Adamson 0-2, Killian Daly and Darragh Daly 0-1 each	Cusack Park, Mullingar; Referee: Declan Nugent (Maryland); Man of the Match: John Heslin

==== Round 2 ====
7/29/17; 19:30	Athlone	1-9 - 0-12	Garrycastle	Tang; Referee: Declan Nugent (Maryland)
7/29/17; 19:30	Ryan Gaffey 0-5 (0-4f), Noel Mulligan 0-3 (0-2f), Mickey Greene 1-0, Daniel Reid 0-1		Alex Gardiner 0-6 (0-4f), Conor Cosgrove 0-3f, Matthew Guiheen, Jonathan McGuire, Tom O'Halloran 0-1 each	Tang; Referee: Declan Nugent (Maryland)

7/29/17; 19:30	St. Loman's Mullingar	5-10 - 0-8	Tyrrellspass	Cusack Park, Mullingar; Referee: Brendan Keena (Ballynacargy); Man of the Match: Ronan O'Toole
7/29/17; 19:30	John Heslin 2-4 (0-3f), Ronan O'Toole 1-1, Sean Flanagan and Fola Ayorinde 1-0 each, David Windsor and Shane Dempsey 0-2 each, Ken Casey 0-1		Conor Slevin 0-3 (0-2f), Nigel Harte and Kieran Geraghty 0-2 each, Aaron O'Brien 0-1	Cusack Park, Mullingar; Referee: Brendan Keena (Ballynacargy); Man of the Match: Ronan O'Toole

7/29/17; 19:30	Mullingar Shamrocks	2-5 - 1-8	Killucan	The Downs; Referee: Sean Carroll (The Downs); Man of the Match: Darragh Daly
7/29/17; 19:30	Darragh Daly and Tye Adamson 1-0 each, Denis Corroon, Simon Quinn, Paddy Fagan, Dean Moore (0-1f), Dylan McDermott 0-1 each		Conor Jordan 1-0 pen, Ciaran Doyle 0-3 (0-1f), Paul Greville and Killian Doyle (0-1f) 0-2 each, David Bryan (1 '45) 0-1	The Downs; Referee: Sean Carroll (The Downs); Man of the Match: Darragh Daly

==== Round 3 ====
8/12/17; 19:00	St. Loman's Mullingar	4-12 - 1-10	Garrycastle	O’Growney Park, Rosemount; Referee: Brendan Keena (Ballynacargy); Man of the Match: John Heslin
8/12/17; 19:00	John Heslin 3-6 (1-0 pen, 0-3f), Paul Sharry 1-1 (0-1f), Sean Flanagan, David Whelan, David Windsor, Ken Casey, Shane Dempsey 0-1 each		Alex Gardiner 1-2, Conor Cosgrove 0-3f, Michael Monaghan 0-2, John Gaffey, Doron Harte, Justin Barrett 0-1 each	O’Growney Park, Rosemount; Referee: Brendan Keena (Ballynacargy); Man of the Match: John Heslin

8/13/17; 19:00	Athlone	2-17 - 2-12	Mullingar Shamrocks	Tubberclair; Referee: Declan Nugent (Maryland); Man of the Match: John Connellan
8/13/17; 19:00	John Connellan 0-7 (0-4f), Noel Mulligan and Alan Gaughan 1-1 each, Ryan Gaffey 0-4 (0-3f), John Egan 0-2, Daniel Reid and Mickey Greene 0-1 each		Denis Corroon (0-4f) and Dean Moore 1-4 each, Donal O'Donoghue, Darren Keena, David Gavin, Tye Adamson 0-1 each	Tubberclair; Referee: Declan Nugent (Maryland); Man of the Match: John Connellan

8/13/17; 19:00	Tyrrellspass	0-12 - 1-8	Killucan	Cusack Park, Mullingar; Referee: Damien Maher (Ballynacargy); Man of the Match: Conor Slevin
8/13/17; 19:00	Conor Slevin (0-2f) and Denis Glennon (0-3f) 0-4 each, Nigel Harte 0-2, Brian Slevin and Kieran Geraghty (0-1f) 0-1 each		Killian Doyle 1-2, Ciaran Doyle 0-3, Paul Greville 0-2 (0-1f), Frank Boyle 0-1	Cusack Park, Mullingar; Referee: Damien Maher (Ballynacargy); Man of the Match: Conor Slevin

==== Round 4 ====
8/22/17	Mullingar Shamrocks	1-9 - 1-8	Garrycastle

8/23/17	St. Loman's Mullingar	2-24 - 0-7	Killucan

8/23/17	Athlone	1-10 - 1-7	Tyrrellspass

==== Round 5 ====
8/27/17	St. Loman's Mullingar	4-14 - 0-12	Athlone

8/27/17	Killucan	1-10 - 1-8	Garrycastle

8/27/17	Tyrrellspass	0-13 - 0-9	Mullingar Shamrocks

=== Group B ===
Team	Pld	W	L	D	PF	PA	PD	Pts
The Downs	5	3	1	1	77	61	+16	7
Coralstown/Kinnegad	5	3	1	1	69	61	+8	7
Rosemount	5	3	2	0	67	63	+4	6
Castledaly	5	2	3	0	66	73	−7	4
Caulry	5	2	3	0	76	70	+6	4
Maryland	5	1	4	0	53	70	−17	2

==== Round 1 ====
7/23/17; 17:30	Coralstown/Kinnegad	0-12 - 1-5	Rosemount	Cusack Park, Mullingar; Referee: Des McEnery (Garrycastle); Man of the Match: Fergal Dardis
7/23/17; 17:30	Ger Leech (0-4f) and Darren Giles (0-3f) 0-4 each, Fergal Dardis 0-2, Wayne Fox and Eamon Fleming 0-1 each		Darragh Healy 1-0, Padraig Nestor and Dude McCormack (0-1f) 0-2 each, Boidu Sayeh 0-1f	Cusack Park, Mullingar; Referee: Des McEnery (Garrycastle); Man of the Match: Fergal Dardis

7/23/17; 19:00	Maryland	1-14 - 1-9	Castledaly	Tang; Referee: Brendan Keenan (Ballynacargy); Man of the Match: Callum McCormack
7/23/17; 19:00	Callum McCormack 0-6 (0-4f), David Martin 1-1, Keith Malynn and Joe Harte 0-3 each, Anthony Reynolds 0-1		Kevin Stone 1-3 (0-2f), Lorcan Dolan 0-4, Ken Larkin and MJ Kelly 0-1 each	Tang; Referee: Brendan Keenan (Ballynacargy); Man of the Match: Callum McCormack

7/23/17; 19:00	The Downs	1-13 - 0-15	Caulry	Cusack Park, Mullingar; Referee: Barry Kelly (Mullingar Shamrocks); Man of the Match: Luke Loughlin
7/23/17; 19:00	Luke Loughlin 0-7 (0-3f), Dean Egerton 1-2, Luke Folan 0-2, Conor Murray and Harry Caulfield 0-1 each,		Harry Hughes and Emmett Nally 0-3 each, Damien Dolan, Rob Hickey, Conor McCormack (0-2f), Andrew O'Sullivan (0-2f) 0-2 each, Gary Flanagan 0-1	Cusack Park, Mullingar; Referee: Barry Kelly (Mullingar Shamrocks); Man of the Match: Luke Loughlin

==== Round 2 ====
7/30/17; 17:30	Coralstown/Kinnegad	1-12 - 1-8	Maryland	Cusack Park, Mullingar; Referee: Barry Kelly (Mullingar Shamrocks); Man of the Match: Darren Giles
7/30/17; 17:30	Darren Giles 0-5 (0-1f), Wayne Fox 1-0, Ger Leech 0-3 (0-2f), Eoin O'Brien, Ronan Foley, Mark Giles, Eamon Fleming 0-1 each		Joe Harte 0-5 (0-3f), Kieran Martin 1-1, Keith Malynn and Darren Malynn 0-1 each	Cusack Park, Mullingar; Referee: Barry Kelly (Mullingar Shamrocks); Man of the Match: Darren Giles

7/30/17; 19:00	Castledaly	0-15 - 2-8	Caulry	Tubberclair; Referee: Brendan Keena (Ballynacargy); Man of the Match: Jordan Nugent
7/30/17; 19:00	Lorcan Dolan 0-7 (0-2f), Jordan Nugent 0-4 (3 '45, 0-1f), Kevin Stone 0-2f, Brendan Kelly and Paul Kelly 0-1 each		Gary Flanagan 1-1, Emmett Nally 1-0, Eoin Fox, Robbie Hickey, Conor McCormack 0-2 each, Harry Hughes 0-1	Tubberclair; Referee: Brendan Keena (Ballynacargy); Man of the Match: Jordan Nugent

7/30/17; 19:00	The Downs	1-17 - 1-10	Rosemount	Cusack Park, Mullingar; Referee: Damien Maher (Ballynacargy); Man of the Match: Luke Folan
7/30/17; 19:00	Dean Egerton 1-4, Luke Folan 0-7 (0-1f), Luke Loughlin 0-5, Niall Nolan 0-1		Sean Petit 0-6 (0-5f), Declan Mullen 1-2, Shane Tone and Dude McCormack (0-1f) 0-1 each	Cusack Park, Mullingar; Referee: Damien Maher (Ballynacargy); Man of the Match: Luke Folan

==== Round 3 ====
8/12/17; 19:00	The Downs	1-15 - 0-5	Maryland	Cusack Park, Mullingar; Referee: Michael Gordon (Shandonagh); Man of the Match: Shane Power
8/12/17; 19:00	Shane Power 1-4, Luke Loughlin 0-6 (0-3f), Luke Folan 0-2, Conor Coughlan, Dean Egerton, Joe Moran 0-1 each		Darren Malynn and Callum McCormack (0-1f, 1 '45) 0-2 each, Joe Harte 0-1	Cusack Park, Mullingar; Referee: Michael Gordon (Shandonagh); Man of the Match: Shane Power

8/13/17; 17:30	Coralstown/Kinnegad	0-16 - 1-9	Castledaly	Tubberclair; Referee: Barry Kelly (Mullingar Shamrocks); Man of the Match: Darren Giles
8/13/17; 17:30	Darren Giles 0-8 (0-4f), Ger Leech 0-3 (0-2f), Wayne Fox 0-2, Daniel Woods, Niall Kilmartin, James Maxwell 0-1 each		Lorcan Dolan 1-4 (0-3f), Jordan Nugent 0-3f, Kevin Stone 0-2 (0-1f)	Tubberclair; Referee: Barry Kelly (Mullingar Shamrocks); Man of the Match: Darren Giles

8/13/17; 17:30	Rosemount	2-8 - 1-8	Caulry	Cusack Park, Mullingar; Referee: Alfie Devine (Castlepollard); Man of the Match: Boidu Sayeh
8/13/17; 17:30	DD McCormack and Cathal Daly 1-0, Sean Petit 0-3 (0-1f), Dude McCormack 0-2, Boidu Sayeh, Enda Boland, Theo Watts 0-1 each		Emmet Nally 1-1 (1-0 pen), Conor McCormack 0-4 (0-3f), Alan Fitzpatrick (0-1f), Cialan Dollard, Peter Smith (0-1f) 0-1 each	Cusack Park, Mullingar; Referee: Alfie Devine (Castlepollard); Man of the Match: Boidu Sayeh

==== Round 4 ====
8/22/17	The Downs	1-10 - 1-10	Coralstown/Kinnegad

8/23/17	Rosemount	1-13 - 1-9	Castledaly

8/23/17	Caulry	2-13 - 1-9	Maryland

==== Round 5 ====
8/27/17	Caulry	2-11 - 2-7	Coralstown/Kinnegad

8/27/17	Rosemount	2-10 - 0-8	Maryland

8/27/17	Castledaly	1-12 - 0-10	The Downs

== Knock-out stages ==
=== Relegation final ===
The bottom finisher from both groups qualify for the Relegation final. The loser will be relegated to the 2017 Intermediate Championship.

- Maryland 0-13, 1-9 Caulry, Tubberclair, 2/9/2017,

=== Finals ===
There are 2 groups called Group A and B. The top finisher in each group qualify for the Semi-finals directly. The second and the third-placed finishers in both groups will qualify for the Quarter-finals.

Quarter-finals
Killucan	0-5
Coralstown/Kinnegad	0-13
Athlone	0-13 (0-12 R)
The Downs	1-10 (1-10 R)

Semi-finals
St. Loman's Mullingar	1-12
Coralstown/Kinnegad	1-6
Tyrrellspass	0-20
The Downs	2-9

Final
St. Loman's Mullingar	3-13
Tyrrellspass	0-14

=== Quarter-finals ===
23 September 2017; Quarter-final	Coralstown/Kinnegad	0-13 - 0-5	Killucan	Cusack Park; Referee: Damien Maher

24 September 2017; Quarter-final	The Downs	1-10 - 0-13	Athlone	Cusack Park; Referee: Barry Kelly

30 September 2017; 2:30 pm Quarter-final Replay	The Downs	1-10 - 0-12	Athlone	Cusack Park

=== Semi-finals ===
15 October 2017; 2:00 pm Semi-final	Tyrrellspass	0-20 - 2-9	The Downs	Cusack Park; Referee: Niall Ward (Garrycastle); Man of the Match: Ger Egan
15 October 2017; 2:00 pm Semi-final	Ger Egan 0-9 (0-5f), Dean McNicholas 0-4, Darren Quinn (2 '45) and Denis Glennon 0-2 each, Aaron O'Brien, David Glennon, Phillip Sheridan 0-1 each		Luke Folan 1-2, Luke Loughlin 0-4 (0-1f), Andrew Kilmartin 1-0, Conor Murray 0-2, Harry Caulfield 0-1	Cusack Park; Referee: Niall Ward (Garrycastle); Man of the Match: Ger Egan

15 October 2017; 3:30 pm Semi-final	St. Loman's Mullingar	1-12 - 1-6	Coralstown/Kinnegad	Cusack Park; Referee: Brendan Keena (Ballynacargy); Man of the Match: John Heslin
15 October 2017; 3:30 pm Semi-final	John Heslin 0-6 (0-5f), Ken Casey 1-0, Shane Dempsey 0-3, Shane Flynn, Paul Sharry (1 '45), David Windsor 0-1 each		Ger Leech 1-2 (0-1f), Darren Giles 0-3, Wayne Fox 0-1	Cusack Park; Referee: Brendan Keena (Ballynacargy); Man of the Match: John Heslin

== Final ==
29 October 2017; 3:30 pm Final	St. Loman's Mullingar	3-13 - 0-14	Tyrrellspass	Cusack Park, Mullingar; Attendance: 5,276; Referee: Declan Nugent (Maryland); Man of the Match: John Heslin
29 October 2017; 3:30 pm Final	John Heslin 2-6 (0-6f), Sean Flanagan 1-1, Ken Casey 0-3, Shane Dempsey 0-2, Paul Sharry 0-1	Report team sheet	Ger Egan 0-9 (0-8f), Conor Slevin 0-2 (0-1f), Ben Gavin, Aaron O'Brien, David Glennon 0-1 each	Cusack Park, Mullingar; Attendance: 5,276; Referee: Declan Nugent (Maryland); Man of the Match: John Heslin
