= Mick Carley =

Irish Gaelic footballer (1940–2019)

Personal information
- Born: 1940 Tyrrellspass, County Westmeath, Ireland
- Died: 17 March 2019 (aged 78) Mullingar, County Westmeath, Ireland

Sport
- Sport: Gaelic football
- Position: Midfield
Clubs
- Years: Club
- St Mary's Rochfortbridge; St Loman's; The Downs; Tyrrellspass; St Vincients - Dublin
Club titles
- Westmeath titles: 7
Inter-county
- Years: County
- 1957–1977: Westmeath
Inter-county titles
- Leinster titles: 0
- All-Irelands: 0
- NFL: 0
- All Stars: 0

Michael Carley (1940 – 17 March 2019) was an Irish Gaelic footballer who played for several clubs (St Mary's Rochfortbridge, St Loman's, The Downs and Tyrrellspass) and for the Westmeath county team. He usually lined out at Midfield. Carley is regarded as one of Westmeath's all-time greatest players.

== Honours ==
St Mary's CBS

- Leinster Colleges Senior B Football Championship (1): 1955

St Mary's Rochfortbridge

- Westmeath Intermediate Football Championship (1): 1958

St Loman's

- Westmeath Senior Football Championship (2): 1961, 1963

The Downs

- Westmeath Senior Football Championship (5): 1968, 1969, 1970, 1972, 1974

Westmeath

- O'Byrne Cup (2): 1959, 1964

Leinster

- Railway Cup (2): 1961, 1962
