= Paul Bannon (Gaelic footballer) =

Irish Gaelic football player

Personal information
- Born: Athlone, County Westmeath

Sport
- Sport: Gaelic football
- Position: Midfield
Club
- Years: Club
- Athlone
Inter-county
Years	County	Apps (scores)
2006-2013	Westmeath	34 (0-9)

Paul Bannon is a Gaelic footballer who plays for his local club Athlone and for the Westmeath county team.

He helped Westmeath to gain promotion to Division 1 in 2006 & 2008.
