= Rosemount, County Westmeath =

Rosemount Baile an Bhric Óig
- Village
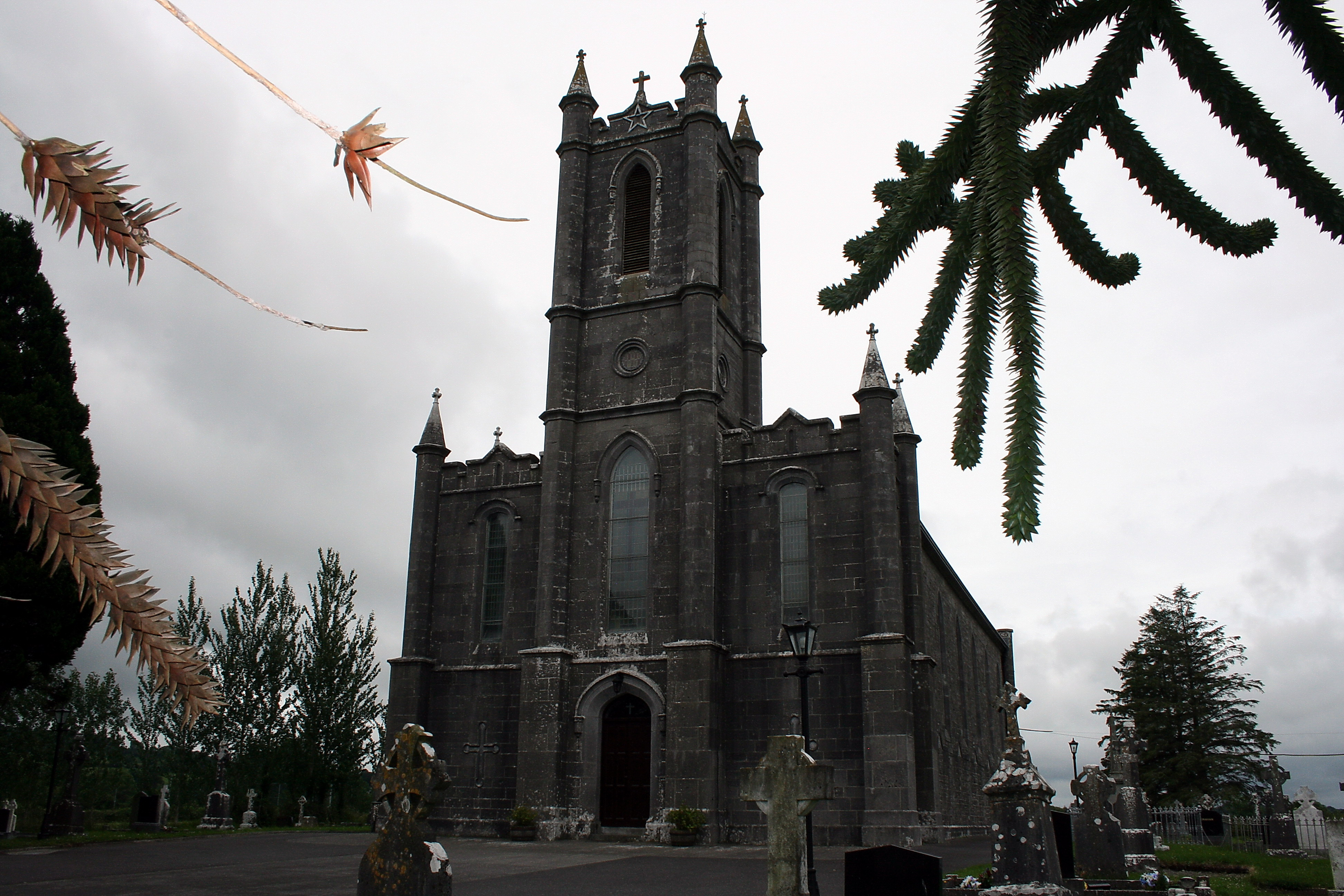
- Church in Rosemount

- Location in Ireland
- Coordinates: 53°26′01″N 7°38′15″W
- Country: Ireland
- Province: Leinster
- County: County Westmeath

Government
  - Dáil Éireann: Longford–Westmeath
- Time zone: UTC+0 (WET)
  - Summer (DST): UTC-1 (IST (WEST))
- Irish Grid Reference: N241426

Rosemount, historically called Ballybrickoge (Irish: Baile an Bhric Óig), is a village in County Westmeath, Ireland. It is located 5 km northeast of the town of Moate.

== History ==
Located close to the southwest border of the ancient Barony of Moycashel, Rosemount was once a stronghold of a prominent branch of the Geoghegan (Mag Eochagain) sept of the Southern UI Neill. Like other Geoghegans in Moycashel, and wider Westmeath, they lost most of their prized grazing land and lake fisheries to the Cromwellian and Williamite settlers (both undertakers and officers) after the Down Survey. Many of the Geoghegan family ancestors are interred in the mortuary chapel at Kill.

In 1932 Harvard Archaeological Society excavated a Bronze Age cairn (cemetery) with the remains of 44 graves from the sixth century on top of Knockastia (or Cnoc Aiste), which at 200 m (656 ft) is one of the highest points in County Westmeath. The village is the namesake of Rosemount, Minnesota, a city in the United States settled in the 1850s by Irish immigrants.

== Amenities ==
Rosemount village consists of a pub, primary school, church and community centre. The community committee holds a harvest fair every year (weather permitting). The national school has been renovated with the addition of a new play yard, three new classrooms, a new computer room and a gym. Rosemount's GAA club has won 9 senior county titles, and are one of the most successful clubs in Westmeath.

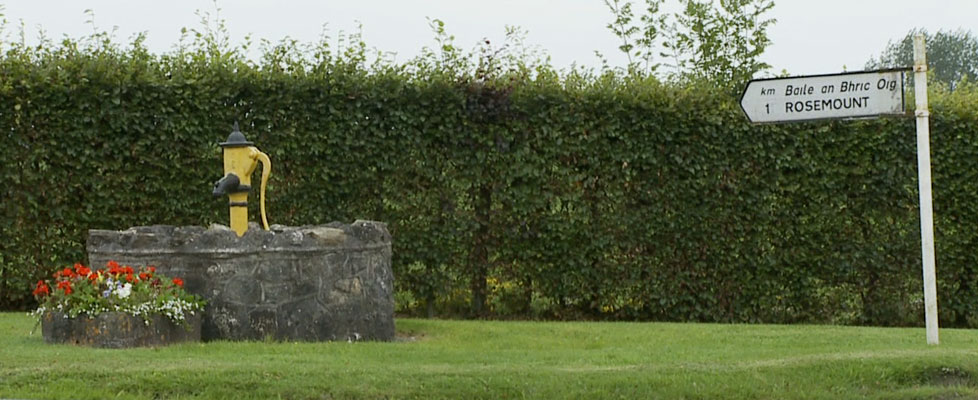
Rosemount Pump

== Music industry ==
Rosemount has a recording studio called Grouse Lodge where musicians such as Paddy Casey, Morrissey, Muse, Snow Patrol, Bloc Party, REM, Shirley Bassey, Stereophonics, The Thrills, Westlife and the Manic Street Preachers have recorded. Rosemount and Grouse Lodge appeared on the American entertainment show Access Hollywood in November 2006, featuring an on-site interview with Michael Jackson who spent five months there recording a new album.

== Sport ==
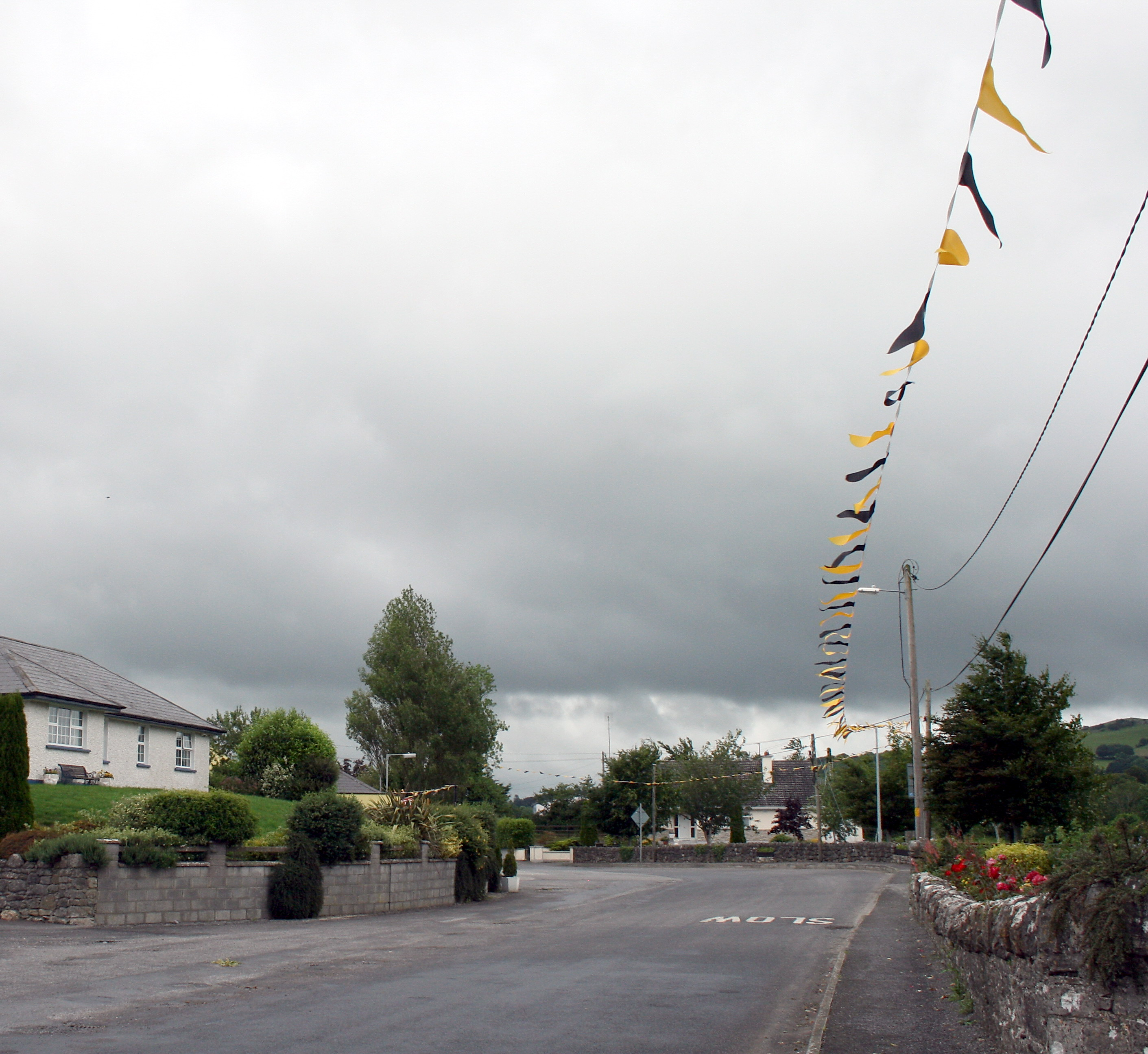
Black and Amber in Rosemount

A book detailing the history of Rosemount G.A.A. and District was published in 1989, "The Black and Amber Story". Many individuals from the parish have played for Westmeath, and the club has nine Westmeath Senior Football Championship titles. As a rural club, the development of young players has traditionally been important and this has resulted in a large number of successes in under-age finals, particularly in the 1970s.

After a 16-year spell out of the senior grade, which they won last in 1989, Rosemount won the Westmeath Intermediate Football Championship in 2016 and returned to the senior competition in 2017.

== The Rose of Tralee ==
In 2022, The Westmeath Rose of Tralee Rachel Duffy was of native of Rosemount, Rachel represented the county in Tralee, Rachel was chosen as the winner, becoming the first Westmeath rose to win, and the first rose since the COVID-19 pandemic.

== See also ==
- List of towns and villages in Ireland
