= Denis Glennon =

Westmeath Gaelic footballer

Personal information
- Born: Mullingar, Ireland

Sport
- Sport: Gaelic football
- Position: Full Forward
Club
- Years: Club
- Tyrrellspass
Club titles
- Westmeath titles: 2
Inter-county
- Years: County
- 2004-: Westmeath
Inter-county titles
- Leinster titles: 1
- NFL: 1

Denis Glennon is a Gaelic footballer from Tyrrellspass, County Westmeath, Ireland who plays for the Westmeath county team. His younger brother David was also a member of the senior panel.

Glennon is considered to be one of the finest talents the county has ever produced. He first appeared on the national scene in 2004.

He is among his county's highest championship scorers.

== Career ==
Glennon was part of the Westmeath team that win the 2004 Leinster Senior Football Championship, he also won a National Football League Div 2 title in 2008. In 2011 he was made captain of the Westmeath team for the year.

He plays his club football with Tyrrellspass, winning Westmeath Senior Football Championship medals in 2006 and 2007. He also played in the Leinster Senior Club Football Championship final in 2007 however Tyrrellspass lost out to Dublin side St Vincents.

== Honours ==
- Leinster Senior Football Championship (1): 2004
- National Football League, Division 2 (1): 2008
- Westmeath Senior Football Championship (2): 2006, 2007

Preceded by Michael Ennis	Westmeath GAA; 2011-2013	Succeeded by Paul Sharry
