= David Glennon =

Irish Gaelic footballer

Personal information
- Born: Mullingar, Ireland

Sport
- Sport: Gaelic football
- Position: Full Forward
Club
- Years: Club
- Tyrrellspass
Club titles
- Westmeath titles: 2
Inter-county
- Years: County
- 2005-2013: Westmeath
Inter-county titles
- NFL: 1

David Glennon is a Gaelic footballer from Tyrrellspass, County Westmeath, Ireland who plays for the Westmeath county team. Glennon is considered to be one of the finest talents the county has ever produced. He was part of the League Final Div 2 in 2006 & 2008.

He plays his club football with Tyrrellspass, winning Westmeath Senior Football Championship medals in 2006 and 2007. He also played in the Leinster Senior Club Football Championship final in 2007 however Tyrrellspass lost out to Dublin side St Vincents His elder brother Dennis is also a member and was one of the first of the county to lift the Leinster trophy.
