= Cormac Bane =

Irish Gaelic footballer

Personal information
- Born: Galway, Ireland

Sport
- Sport: Gaelic Football
- Position: Left corner forward
Club
- Years: Club
- 2002–: Caherlistrane
Inter-county
Years	County	Apps (scores)
2006–2012	Galway	49 (6-72)
Inter-county titles
- Connacht titles: 1

Cormac Bane is an Irish Gaelic footballer from Galway. Bane plays his club football with Caherlistrane and county football for the Galway senior team.

Bane was called up to the Galway senior team in 2006 by manager Peter Ford.
