= Paul Sharry =

Irish sportsperson (born 1989)

Personal information
- Native name: Pól Ó Shearraigh (Irish)
- Born: 14 January 1989 (age 37) Mullingar, County Westmeath
- Height: 6 ft 3 in (191 cm)

Sport
- Sport: Gaelic football
- Position: Half Forward
Club
- Years: Club
- St Loman'
Inter-county
- Years: County
- Westmeath

Paul Sharry (born 14 January 1989) is a Gaelic footballer who plays for the Westmeath county team.

Sharry played in his youth team active football and was contracted with Cherry Orchard. He joined Shamrock Rovers of the League of Ireland in 2007 and was an occasional part of the matchday squad as a defender.

== Playing career ==
The St Loman's GAA clubman represented Westmeath GAA at senior level and played in the NFL division 3 final in 2011. Sharry represented the Ireland national Australian rules football team, that won the 2011 Australian Football International Cup and kicked three goals in the tournament. He was selected on the International Cup All Star Team.
