= Westmeath Intermediate Football Championship =

Annual Gaelic football competition

- Irish: Craobh Chomórtais Peile Idirmheánach na hIarmhí
- Code: Gaelic football
- Region: Westmeath (GAA)
- No. of teams: 12
- Title holders: St Malachy's (4th title)

Westmeath Intermediate Football Championship is an annual Gaelic Athletic Association competition organised by Westmeath GAA between Gaelic football clubs in County Westmeath. The winner of the competition qualifies to represent the county in the Leinster Intermediate Club Football Championship, the winner of which progresses to the All-Ireland Intermediate Club Football Championship.

The top club is promoted to the Westmeath Senior Football Championship, while the bottom club is relegated to the Westmeath Junior Football Championship.

== History ==
In its early years, the competition was more transitional, with Caulry winning against Tyrrellspass in the 1946 IFC final and qualifying for the senior championship in the same year.

The 1973 final was held at Páirc Chiaráin in Athlone, the first major championship final held there in more than two decades.

Garrycastle won the 1997 final (after a replay), four years before they went on to win the senior championship.

The 1999 final required three games to separate the teams.

Pat Flanagan, later manager of the senior Westmeath county team, was in charge of Kilbeggan Shamrocks when they won the 2000 final.

Ballinagore won the 2007 competition, following on from winning the Westmeath and Leinster junior titles of two years previously.

Maryland won the 2008 final (after a replay, which went to extra-time), having earlier linked up with Marty Whelan to win Celebrity Bainisteoir. Kieran Martin scored a goal in the drawn game. It was Martin who scored the decisive solo goal in the inaugural Tailteann Cup final, winning that title for Westmeath fourteen years later. Back in 2008, Maryland won an in IFC final at the tenth effort (if replays are counted) since the club last won the title in 1980.

Tubberclair defeated Ballynacargy in the 2009 final, then went on to the Leinster Intermediate Football Championship final.

Jack Cooney was manager of Coralstown/Kinnegad when the club won the 2011 final against Castletown-Finea/Coole/Whitehall.

Former Roscommon player Francie Grehan managed Caulry to the 2014 title.

The 2017 champions were St Mary's Rochfortbridge, who had been promoted for 2008 after winning the Westmeath Junior Football Championship.

== Qualification for subsequent competitions ==
=== Leinster Intermediate Club Football Championship ===
The Westmeath IFC winner qualifies for the Leinster Intermediate Club Football Championship. It is the only team from County Westmeath to qualify for this competition. The Westmeath IFC winner may enter the Leinster Intermediate Club Football Championship at either the preliminary round or the quarter-final stage.

=== All-Ireland Intermediate Club Football Championship ===
The Westmeath IFC winner — by winning the Leinster Intermediate Club Football Championship — may qualify for the All-Ireland Intermediate Club Football Championship, at which it would enter at the __ stage, providing it hasn't been drawn to face the British champions in the quarter-finals.

== Roll of honour (incomplete) ==
See here

- 2026: Milltown
- 2025: Tubberclair
- 2024: Garrycastle GAA
- 2023: St Malachys
- 2022: Shandonagh
- 2021: Tang
- 2020: Moate All Whites
- 2019: Caulry
- 2018: Shandonagh
- 2017: St Mary's Rochfortbridge
- 2016: Rosemount
- 2015: Athlone
- 2014: Caulry
- 2013: St Malachy's
- 2012: Castletown/Finea/Coole/Whitehall
- 2011: Coralstown-Kinnegad
- 2010: Bunbrosna
- 2009: Tubberclair
- 2008: Maryland
- 2007: Ballinagore
- 2006: Bunbrosna
- 2005: Killucan
- 2004: St Mary's Rochfortbridge
- 2003: Ballymore
- 2002: Tubberclair
- 2001: St Malachys
- 2000: Kilbeggan Shamrocks
- 1999: Ballynacargy
- 1998: Ballymore
- 1997: Garrycastle
- 1996: Ballynacargy
- 1995: St Mary's Rochfortbridge
- 1994: Castledaly
- 1993: Tang
- 1992: Killucan
- 1991: Tyrellspass
- 1990: Tang
- 1989: St Paul's
- 1988: Mullingar Shamrocks
- 1987: Ballynacargy
- 1986: Ballinagore
- 1985: Caulry
- 1984: Ballymore
- 1983: Tyrellspass
- 1982: Tang
- 1981: Milltownpass
- 1980: Maryland
- 1979: Tubberclair
- 1978: St Mary's Rochfortbridge
- 1977: St Paul's
- 1976: Castletown Finea
- 1975: St Malachy's
- 1974: Kilbeggan
- 1973: Tang
- 1972: Ballymore
- 1971: Bunbrosna
- 1970: St Finians
- 1969: Caulry
- 1968: No Competition
- 1967: No Competition
- 1966: No Competition
- 1967: No Competition
- 1966: No Competition
- 1965: No Competition
- 1964: No Competition
- 1963: No Competition
- 1962: No Competition
- 1961: Kilbeggan
- 1960: Kinnegad (played March 1961)
- 1958: St Mary's Rochfortbridge
- 1957 Boher
- 1950: The Downs
- 1946: Caulry
