= Tyrrellspass GAA =

Gaelic football club in County Westmeath, Ireland

Tyrrellspass
- Bealach an Tirialaigh
- Founded: 1961
- County: Westmeath
- Colours: Sky Blue and Blue
- Grounds: Tyrrellspass
- Coordinates: 53°25′01.02″N 7°18′08.80″W nickname =

Playing kits
Standard colours

Tyrrellspass GAA is a Gaelic Athletic Association club located in the town of Tyrrellspass in County Westmeath, Ireland.

== History ==
The team was founded in 1961 and participates in both men's and women's leagues.

The team won the Westmeath Senior Football Championship in 1999, 2006 and defended their title in 2007. In the 2007 Leinster Club Football Championship they progressed as far as the final, where they were beaten by the eventual All Ireland Club champions St. Vincents of Dublin.

In 2016 & 2017, Tyrrellspass lost the county final to St. Loman's.

== Senior honours in Westmeath ==
- Westmeath Senior Football Championship (3) 1999, 2006, 2007

== Notable players ==
- Ger Egan, 2022 Tailteann Cup winner
- David Glennon, 2004 Leinster SFC winner
- Denis Glennon, 2004 Leinster SFC winner
- Jamie Gonoud, 2022 Tailteann Cup winner
- Nigel Harte
