= Mullingar Shamrocks =

- An Muileann gCearr
- Founded: 1953
- County: Westmeath
- Nickname: Shamrocks
- Colours: Green and White
- Grounds: Mullingar
- Coordinates: 53°25′01.02″N 7°18′08.80″W

Playing kits
Standard colours

Mullingar Shamrocks is a Gaelic Athletic Association club located in the town of Mullingar in County Westmeath, Ireland.

== History ==
The team was founded in 1953 and participates in both men's and women's leagues.

== Honours ==
- Westmeath Senior Football Championships: (13)
  - 1964, 1966, 1986, 1987, 1990, 1992, 1993, 1994, 1995, 2000, 2012, 2018, 2023
- Westmeath Intermediate Football Championships: (1)
  - 1988

== Notable players and club members ==
- Paddy Flanagan
- Barry Kelly
