= Garrycastle GAA =

GAA club in Westmeath, Ireland

- Caisleán an Gharraí
- Founded: 1981
- County: Westmeath
- Colours: Green and Red
- Grounds: Garrycastle
- Coordinates: 53°25′42.10″N 7°55′30.52″W

Playing kits
Standard colours	Reserve

Senior Club Championships
	All Ireland	Leinster champions	Westmeath champions
Football:	0	1	8
Hurling:	0	0	0

Garrycastle is a Gaelic football club from the town of Athlone in County Westmeath, Ireland.

The club was founded in 1981 after GAA fans in the area saw the need for a second club in Athlone to cater for the growing population of the town. They won their first Westmeath senior football championship in 2001, and their first Leinster club football title in 2011 after a last-minute free from second-half substitute Conor Cosgrove. They are the first and only Westmeath club to win the title. In 2004, Dessie Dolan was the first player from the club to be awarded an All Star. Dolan received an award for Westmeath footballer of the year for 2015 after his Man of the Match performance against Meath in the Leinster Championship. On 17 March 2012, they played in their first All-Ireland Senior Club Football Championship final against Crossmaglen Rangers at Croke Park. The match finished in a draw on a 1-12 to 0-15 scoreline. Crossmaglen went on to win the replay to claim their sixth title. They were last Westmeath senior football champions in 2019, beating St Loman’s 2-13 to 3-06 on 13 October.

== Notable players ==
- Dessie Dolan
- James Dolan

== Honours ==
- Westmeath Senior Football Championship:
  - Winner (8): 2001, 2002, 2004, 2009, 2010, 2011, 2014, 2019
- Leinster Senior Club Football Championship:
  - Winner (1): 2011
- Westmeath Intermediate Football Championships: (2)
  - 1997, 2024
- Westmeath Junior Football Championships: (3)
  - 1982, 1993, 2011
- Westmeath Division 1 Leagues (8):
  - 2001, 2002, 2003, 2008, 2009, 2012, 2018, 2019
- Westmeath Division 2 League (2):
  - 1995, 2024
- Westmeath Division 3 League (1):
  - 2012
- Westmeath Ladies Senior Football Championships (5):
  - 2003, 2008, 2009, 2010, 2012
- Westmeath Ladies Intermediate Football Championship (1):
  - 2001
- Westmeath Ladies Junior Football Championship (2):
  - 1997, 1999
- Westmeath Ladies Division 1 Leagues (4):
  - 2009, 2010, 2021, 2022
