= Athlone GAA =

Gaelic games club in County Westmeath, Ireland

- Cumann Lúthchleas Gael Baile Atha Luain
- Founded: 1885
- County: Westmeath
- Colours: Blue and White
- Grounds: Pairc Chiaran, Ballymahon Road, Athlone, Westmeath
- Coordinates: 53°25′42″N 7°55′30″W

Playing kits
Standard colours

Senior Club Championships
	All Ireland	Leinster champions	Westmeath champions
Football:	-	-	19
Hurling:	-	-	4

Athlone GAA is the Gaelic football club in the town of Athlone in County Westmeath, Ireland. Athlone is Westmeath GAA's most successful football club, having won the Westmeath Senior Football Championship on 19 occasions. The local hurling club is called Southern Gaels.

== Club history ==
=== Foundation and development ===
The club was founded in 1885 by Irish National League members, bringing GAA to Athlone.

Athlone GAA club, which is Westmeath's most successful club with 19 senior football titles, achieved an unprecedented six-in-a-row between 1955 and 1960. The club won its last senior football title in 1998.

The club is home to Westmeath's first footballing All-Star, Rory O'Connell. Irish rugby international Robbie Henshaw also previously played senior and underage football for Athlone.

In 2017, the club bridged a 24-year gap by winning the County Minor Championship.

2018 represented their seventh time to qualify for Feile Peil na nOg, winning Div 2. Athlone also won the inaugural U20 Football championship in 2018, beating Castleday/Rosemount in the final.

John Deacy, a defender on the 1965 Westmeath Senior Championship winning team, received his medal after a 55-year delay in October 2020.

=== Legal dispute ===
Following Athlone GAA's winning of the Westmeath County Championship in 1984, it was decided to send the team to the United States in 1985. More than £11,000 was collected and put in a bank account set up for the purpose. A dispute over control of the trip's finances between executive committee members and the tour committee led to a lengthy legal dispute. In 1994, the case went to the Supreme Court of Ireland and was still ongoing in 2001.

== Club infrastructure ==
The club caters for both football and hurling with the hurlers playing under the Southern Gaels banner. The club has three full size floodlit pitches, the third pitch is dedicated to the memory of former player and coach, David Allen. The Athlone GAA also has its own bar and ballroom and is used by various local groups.

== Notable players ==
- Ray Connellan
- Rory O'Connell
- Robbie Henshaw
- Eamonn Coleman

== Notable managers ==
- Liam McHale

== Honours ==
- Westmeath Senior Football Championships (19)
  - 1892,1947, 1949, 1955, 1956, 1957, 1958, 1959, 1960, 1965, 1971, 1973, 1977, 1979, 1982, 1984, 1988, 1991, 1998.
- Westmeath Intermediate Football Championships (1)
  - 2015
- Leinster Intermediate Club Football Championship
  - Runners-Up 2015
- Westmeath Junior Football Championships (8)
  - 1916, 1921, 1945, 1954, 1969, 1975, 1976, 1977.
- Westmeath Under 21 Football Championships (11)
  - 1963, 1971, 1980, 1981, 1982, 1983, 1986, 1988, 1996, 2005, 2013
- Westmeath Under 20 Football Championships (1)
  - 2018
- Westmeath Minor Football Championships (12)
  - 1949, 1950, 1952, 1954, 1969, 1978, 1979, 1981, 1984, 1986, 1993, 2017.
- Feis Cup Senior Football (10)
  - 1956, 1957, 1960, 1967, 1970, 1971, 1972, 1974, 1977, 1993.
- Westmeath Senior 'B' Football Championships (1)
  - 1985
- Féile na nÓg
  - 1985 (Cork) 1997, 1998, 2010, 2011, 2014, 2018 (Div 2)
