= St Loman's GAA =

Sports club in Mullingar, Ireland

St Lomans Mullingar
- Naomh Lomáin
- Founded: 1910
- County: Westmeath
- Nickname: The Blues/The Saints/The Mental
- Colours: Blue and White
- Grounds: Dovida Lakepoint Park, Delvin Road, Mullingar
- Coordinates: 53.5339°N 7.3151°W

Playing kits
Standard colours

Senior Club Championships
	All Ireland	Leinster champions	Westmeath champions
Football:	-	-	11
Hurling:	-	-	1
Ladies' football:	-	-	-

St Loman's Mullingar GAA is a Gaelic Athletic Association club in Mullingar, Ireland. The club plays at Dovida Lakepoint Park on the Delvin Road.

== History ==
The club was founded with the name Mental Hospital and represented the staff of St. Loman's Hospital, Mullingar, a psychiatric hospital which operated from 1855–2015. They played under the name Springfield Stars in 1910, becoming Mental Hospital in the 1920s and St. Loman's Mullingar in the late 1950s.

=== Gaelic football ===
St Loman's Mullingar G.A.A. have won eleven county senior titles. The first of these came in 1948, while the most recent title was won in the 2024 Westmeath Senior Football Championship.

=== Hurling ===
Mental Hospital won the 1924 Westmeath Senior Hurling Championship.

=== Ladies' football ===
St Loman's Ground hosted the final of the 2000 All-Ireland Ladies Club Football Championship.

== Notable players ==
- Mick Carley
- Jason Daly
- Paddy Flanagan
- John Heslin
- Sam McCartan
- Billy O'Loughlin
- Ronan O'Toole
- Paul Sharry
- Phil Smyth

== Honours ==
- Westmeath Senior Football Championship (11): 1948, 1961, 1963, 2013, 2015, 2016, 2017, 2020, 2021, 2023, 2024
- Westmeath Senior Hurling Championship (1): 1924
