= The Downs GAA =

Irish Gaelic football club

The Downs
- CLG Na Dúnta
- Founded: 1893
- County: Westmeath
- Nickname: Na Dúnta
- Colours: Black and Amber
- Grounds: Breedon Kevin Molloy Park
- Coordinates: 53°30′26″N 7°14′29″W

Playing kits
Standard colours

Senior Club Championships
	All Ireland	Leinster champions	Westmeath champions
Football:	-	-	11

The Downs Gaelic Athletic Association (Cumann Lúthchleas Gael Na Dúnta) is a Gaelic football and ladies' Gaelic football club located in County Westmeath, Ireland.

The club is located in The Downs, a community 6 km (4 mi) east of Mullingar.

== History ==
The club was founded in 1893 and has used a variety of names: Woodown Rackers, The Downs Pigeons, The Downs Clan Lár and The Downs St Ciarán's. The Downs have won twelve county titles and in 1972 reached the final of the Leinster Senior Club Football Championship, losing to St Vincents., and also in 2022, losing to Kilmacud Crokes.

== Honours ==
=== Gaelic football ===
- Westmeath Senior Football Championship (12): 1918, 1968, 1969, 1970, 1972, 1974, 1980, 2003, 2005, 2022, 2025, 2026
- Westmeath Intermediate Football Championship (1): 1950
- Westmeath Junior Football Championship (5): 1907, 1927, 1934, 1949, 1964
- Westmeath Senior Football League (13): 1966, 1968, 1969, 1970, 1972, 1976, 1980, 1986, 1987, 1988, 1989, 2006, 2022

== Notable players ==
- Paddy Flanagan
- Luke Loughlin
- Jonathan Lynam
- Brendan Murtagh
