= Westmeath Senior Football Championship =

Annual Gaelic football competition

- Irish: Craobh Sinsear Peile na hIarmhí
- Code: Football
- Founded: 1892
- Region: Westmeath GAA (GAA)
- Trophy: Flanagan Cup
- No. of teams: 12
- Title holders: The Downs (12th title)
- Most titles: Athlone (20 titles)
- Sponsors: Shay Murtagh Precast
- TV partner: Iarmhí TV
- Official website: Westmeath GAA

The Westmeath Senior Football Championship is an annual Gaelic Athletic Association competition organised by Westmeath GAA between the top Gaelic football clubs in County Westmeath.

The winner of the Westmeath Championship qualifies to represent the county in the Leinster Senior Club Football Championship, the winner of which progresses to the All-Ireland Senior Club Football Championship.

The current champions are The Downs, having defeated St. Loman's in the 2026 final, winning back to back titles for the first time since 1969.

== Current senior teams ==
The 12 teams that competed in the 2026 Westmeath Senior Football Championship are:

Group 1: The Downs, St Loman's, Garrycastle, Coralstown-Kinnegad, Mullingar Shamrocks & Caulry

Group 2: Tubberclair, Moate All Whites, Athlone, Killucan, Tyrellspass & Tang

Tubberclair gained promotion to the senior championship as a reward for their 2025 Westmeath Intermediate Football Championship victory, while St Malachys were relegated to the intermediate championship for 2026.

== Top winners ==
#	Team	Wins	Years won
1	Athlone	20	1892, 1909, 1947, 1949, 1955, 1956, 1957, 1958, 1959, 1960, 1965, 1971, 1973, 1977, 1979, 1982, 1984, 1988, 1991, 1998
2	The Downs	12	1918, 1968, 1969, 1970, 1972, 1974, 1980, 2003, 2005, 2022, 2025, 2026
2	Mullingar Shamrocks	12	1964, 1966, 1986, 1987, 1990, 1992, 1993, 1994, 1995, 2000, 2012, 2018
4	St Loman's	11	1948, 1961, 1963, 2013, 2015, 2016, 2017, 2020, 2021, 2023, 2024
5	Riverstown Emmets	9	1904, 1906, 1907, 1908, 1910, 1911, 1912, 1913, 1914
5	Rosemount	9	1932, 1934, 1939, 1940, 1941, 1951, 1952, 1953, 1989
7	Moate All Whites	8	1933, 1936, 1943, 1975, 1976, 1978, 1983, 1997
7	Garrycastle	8	2001, 2002, 2004, 2009, 2010, 2011, 2014, 2019
7	Kilbeggan Shamrocks	8	1919, 1921, 1924, 1926, 1927, 1930, 1931, 1935
10	Kinnegad	5	1916, 1929, 1944, 1945, 1946
10	Rochfortbridge Warriors	5	1915, 1917, 1923, 1925, 1928
12	Tyrrellspass	3	1999, 2006, 2007
12	St Mary's Rochfortbridge	3	1950, 1954, 1962
14	Milltown	2	1938, 1942
15	Castledaly	1	2008
15	Coralstown/Kinnegad	1	1996
15	Tubberclair	1	1985
15	St Malachy's	1	1981
15	St Finian's	1	1967
15	Coralstown	1	1937
15	Mullingar Young Irelands	1	1903

== List of finals ==
Year	Winner	Score	Opponent	Score
2026	The Downs	1-18	St Loman's	0-20
2025	The Downs	4-12	Coralstown/Kinnegad	1-15
2024	St Loman's	1-15 (3 pen) (R) (AET); 1-13	The Downs	2-12 (0 pen) (R); 1-13
2023	St Loman's	0-09	Coralstown/Kinnegad	0-07
2022	The Downs	1-08	St Loman's	0-07
2021	St Loman's	0-13, 1-16 (R) (AET)	Garrycastle	0-13, 1-12 (R)
2020	St Loman's	0-17	Tyrrellspass	2-09
2019	Garrycastle	2-13	St Loman's	3-06
2018	Mullingar Shamrocks	2-12	St Loman's	1-11
2017	St Loman's	3-13	Tyrrellspass	0-14
2016	St Loman's	1-13	Tyrrellspass	0-10
2015	St Loman's	1-15	Castledaly	0-08
2014	Garrycastle	1-11	Mullingar Shamrocks	0-08
2013	St Loman's	1-16	Tyrrellspass	0-15
2012	Mullingar Shamrocks	3-09, 0-12 (R)	Garrycastle	3-09, 1-08 (R)
2011	Garrycastle	0-11, 1-09 (R)	Mullingar Shamrocks	1-08, 0-09 (R)
2010	Garrycastle	2-09	Mullingar Shamrocks	1-08
2009	Garrycastle	3-08	St Loman's	0-06
2008	Castledaly	0-10	Garrycastle	0-08
2007	Tyrrellspass	1-10	Mullingar Shamrocks	2-04
2006	Tyrrellspass	0-09, 1-07 (R)	Castledaly	0-09, 0-05 (R)
2005	The Downs	1-10	Garrycastle	0-10
2004	Garrycastle	1-08	Castledaly	0-09
2003	The Downs	2-11	Athlone	1-09
2002	Garrycastle	4-11	Castledaly	0-09
2001	Garrycastle	1-09	Tyrrellspass	0-11
2000	Mullingar Shamrocks	1-05	Tyrrellspass	0-02
1999	Tyrrellspass	2-06	Athlone	1-07
1998	Athlone	3-10	Coralstown/Kinnegad	3-08
1997	Moate All Whites	2-11	Coralstown/Kinnegad	1-09
1996	Coralstown/Kinnegad	2-10	Moate All Whites	0-10
1995	Mullingar Shamrocks	0-18	Rosemount	1-07
1994	Mullingar Shamrocks	1-14	Tyrrellspass	0-09
1993	Mullingar Shamrocks	0-13	Rosemount	0-04
1992	Mullingar Shamrocks	0-14	Athlone	0-04
1991	Athlone	1-07	Mullingar Shamrocks	0-07
1990	Mullingar Shamrocks	2-07	Coralstown/Kinnegad	2-06
1989	Rosemount	1-09	Athlone	0-05
1988	Athlone	0-12	Tubberclair	0-07
1987	Mullingar Shamrocks	0-06	Moate All Whites	0-02
1986	Mullingar Shamrocks	1-11	The Downs	2-05
1985	Tubberclair	2-04	St Malachy's	0-07
1984	Athlone	2-09	Moate All Whites	1-07
1983	Moate All Whites	1-05	St Malachy's	0-07
1982	Athlone	0-07	St Malachy's	0-04
1981	St Malachy's	1-09	Athlone	1-08
1980	The Downs	1-02	Kilbeggan Shamrocks	0-03
1979	Athlone	1-10	Mullingar Shamrocks	0-05
1978	Moate All Whites	1-09	Athlone	0-08
1977	Athlone	3-07	Moate All Whites	1-07
1976	Moate All Whites	2-05, 2-06 (R)	The Downs	1-08, 0-02 (R)
1975	Moate All Whites	0-08	The Downs	0-05
1974	The Downs	0-13	Athlone	0-01
1973	Athlone	2-09	The Downs	0-08
1972	The Downs	0-11	Athlone	1-06
1971	Athlone	1-08	Moate All Whites	0-07
1970	The Downs	0-09, 1-15 (R)	Moate All Whites	0-09, 0-12 (R)
1969	The Downs	2-07	Moate All Whites	0-09
1968	The Downs	2-06	St Loman's	1-07
1967	St Finian's	3-05	St Mary's Rochfortbridge	0-03
1966	Mullingar Shamrocks	5-10	Maryland	1-05
1965	Athlone	2-07	Ballymore	0-06
1964	Mullingar Shamrocks	0-08	St Mary's Rochfortbridge	1-03
1963	St Loman's	0-08, 3-07 (R)	St Mary's Rochfortbridge	1-05, 0-01 (R)
1962	St Mary's Rochfortbridge	2-09	Rosemount	0-07
1961	St Loman's	0-10	St Mary's Rochfortbridge	1-05
1960	Athlone	0-06	St Finian's	0-03
1959	Athlone	4-04	St Mary's Rochfortbridge	1-11
1958	Athlone	0-09	Mental Hospital St Loman's	0-08
1957	Athlone	2-08	Mental Hospital St Loman's	1-05
1956	Athlone	0-12	Kinnegad	1-07
1955	Athlone	2-07	Kinnegad	2-02
1954	St Mary's Rochfortbridge	3-07	Athlone	4-00
1953	Rosemount	0-14	Athlone	2-03
1952	Rosemount	2-00, 2-05 (R)	St Mary's Rochfortbridge	0-06, 1-04 (R)
1951	Rosemount	2-07	Kinnegad	1-04
1950	St Mary's Rochfortbridge	2-09	Athlone	0-08
1949	Athlone	0-07	Mental Hospital St Loman's	0-06
1948	Mental Hospital St Loman's	0-05	Athlone	0-01
1947	Athlone	2-09	Kinnegad	2-03
1946	Kinnegad	1-05	Rosemount	1-03
1945	Kinnegad	0-05 (awarded to Kinnegad)	Moate All Whites	1-05
1944	Kinnegad	3-07	Mullingar Shamrocks	2-08
1943	Moate All Whites	2-04	Milltown	1-05
1942	Milltown	5-06	Drumraney	0-04
1941	Rosemount	3-01	Ballynacargy	0-02
1940	Rosemount	4-03	Milltown	1-06
1939	Rosemount	3-02	Moate All Whites	1-02
1938	Milltown	1-05	Coralstown	1-01
1937	Coralstown	4-05	Moate All Whites	2-04
1936	Moate All Whites	0-09	Rochfortbridge Warriors	0-01
1935	Kilbeggan Shamrocks	0-05	Coralstown	0-02
1934	Rosemount	1-03	Coralstown	0-04
1933	Moate All Whites	1-08	Kinnegad	1-06
1932	Rosemount	1-03 (R)	Kilbeggan Shamrocks	0-02 (R)
1931	Kilbeggan Shamrocks	2-04	Rochfortbridge Warriors	0-03
1930	Kilbeggan Shamrocks	0-04	Rochfortbridge Warriors	0-01
1929	Kinnegad	3-06	Rochfortbridge Warriors	3-03
1928	Rochfortbridge Warriors	1-02	Athlone Military	1-04 (awarded to RW)
1927	Kilbeggan Shamrocks	1-04	Drumraney	1-03
1926	Kilbeggan Shamrocks	1-03	Rochfortbridge Warriors	1-01
1925	Rochfortbridge Warriors	1-05	Athlone	1-02
1924	Kilbeggan Shamrocks	1-02	Rochfortbridge Warriors	1-01
1923	Rochfortbridge Warriors	0-03	Kilbeggan Shamrocks	0-02
1922	No Championship			
1921	Kilbeggan Shamrocks	3-05	Rochfortbridge Warriors	1-01
1920	No Championship			
1919	Kilbeggan Shamrocks	1-07	Kinnegad	1-01
1918	The Downs	3-03	Athlone	0-01
1917	Rochfortbridge Warriors	4-01	Riverstown Emmets	1-03
1916	Kinnegad St Patrick's	2-02	Riverstown Emmets	0-00
1915	Rochfortbridge Warriors	6-02	Riverstown Emmets	1-02
1914	Riverstown Emmets	2-01	The Downs	1-01
1913	Riverstown Emmets	1-04	The Downs	0-01
1912	Riverstown Emmets	0-03	Kinnegad St Patrick's	0-02
1911	Riverstown Emmets	2-04	Kinnegad St Patrick's	1-02
1910	Riverstown Emmets	1-05 (awarded)	Athlone	2-02
1909	Athlone Volunteers	0-04 (R)	Riverstown Emmets	0-02 (R)
1908	Riverstown Emmets	1-02	Cullion Celtics	1-01
1907	Riverstown Emmets	2-04	Athlone	1-00
1906	Riverstown Emmets	2-05	Cullion Celtics	2-04
1905	Athlone Volunteers	refused to be awarded		
1904	Riverstown Emmets	2-16 (R)	Athlone	0-01 (R)
1903	Mullingar Young Irelands	1-04	Moate Stars of Erin	0-02
1902	No Championship			
1901	No Championship			
1900	No Championship			
1899	No Championship			
1898	No Championship			
1897	No Championship			
1896	No Championship			
1895	No Championship			
1894	No Championship			
1893	No Championship			
1892	Athlone		Mullingar Commercials	
