= 2022 Tailteann Cup final =

Final match of the 2022 Tailteann Cup

- Match programme cover
- Event: 2022 Tailteann Cup
Cavan	Westmeath
1–13 (16)	2–14 (20)
- Date: 9 July 2022
- Venue: Croke Park, Dublin
- Man of the Match: Ronan O'Toole (Westmeath)
- Referee: Barry Cassidy (Derry)

The 2022 Tailteann Cup final was the final of the 2022 Tailteann Cup, the first edition of the GAA's second-tier Gaelic football competition for county teams. The match was played at Croke Park in Dublin on 9 July 2022, between Cavan and Westmeath. Westmeath won the match on a scoreline of 2–14 to 1–13.

John Heslin overtook Dessie Dolan as Westmeath's all-time championship top scorer in this game.

== Paths to the final ==
=== Cavan ===
28 May 2022 Round 1 (N)	Cavan	0-24 – 1-12	Down	Kingspan Breffni
	Pts: Raymond Galligan 7, 4f, 3 45s, Gearoid McKiernan 6, 4f, Paddy Lynch 4, 1f, James Smith 2, Gerard Smith 2, Oisin Kiernan 1, Thomas Edward Donohoe 1, Niall Carolan 1	Report	Gls: Ruairi O'Hare 1 Pts: Liam Kerr 3, Andrew Gilmore 2 (1f), Barry O'Hagan 2 (1f), Anthony Doherty 1, Odhran Murdock 1, Ryan Magill 1, Ruairi McCormack 1	Referee: David Gough (Meath); Attendance: 3,616

5 June 2022 Quarter-final (N)	Fermanagh	0-13 – 2-16	Cavan	Brewster Park
	Pts: Sean Quigley 8 (8f), Daragh McGurn (1f), Ryan Jones 2 each, James McMahon 1	Report	Gls: Thomas Galligan 1, Padraig Faulkner 1 Pts: Thomas Galligan 4, Gearoid McKiernan 5, Paddy Lynch 3 (2f), Raymond Galligan (45), Jason McLoughlin, Conor Brady, Cormac O'Reilly 1 each	Referee: Paul Faloon (Down)

19 June 2022 Semi-final	Sligo	1-14 – 0-20	Cavan	Croke Park, Dublin

=== Westmeath ===
29 May 2022 Round 1 (S)	Westmeath	1-13 – 0-13	Laois	MW Hire O'Moore Park
	Gls: S McCartan 1 Pts: S McCartan 1, J Heslin 5 (4f), L Loughlin 4 (1 '45'), R O'Toole, J Lynam, R Forde 1 each	Report	Pts: M Barry 5 (4f), E O'Carroll 4 (1f), E Lowry 2 (1m), J Finn (f), D Kingston 1 each	Referee: D O'Mahoney (Tipperary)

5 June 2022 Quarter-final (S)	Carlow	2-13 – 1-21	Westmeath	Netwatch Dr Cullen Park
	Gls: N Hickey 1, J Moore 1 Pts: D Foley 5 (5f), R Dunphy, C Hulton 2 each, M Bambrick, S Clarke, C Doyle, J Clarke (f) 1 each	Report	Gls: J Heslin 1 Pts: J Heslin 9 (7f), L Loughlin 4 (1f), S McCartan 3, R O'Toole 2, J Gonoud, S Duncan, L Dolan (1m) 1 each	Referee: Conor Lane (Cork)

19 June 2022 Semi-final	Westmeath	3-22 – 2-16	Offaly	Croke Park, Dublin

== Pre-match ==
=== Scoring ===
Ahead of the game, the top scorer for Cavan in the 2022 Ulster SFC and Tailteann Cup was Gearóid McKiernan, while the top scorer for Westmeath in the 2022 Leinster SFC and Tailteann Cup was John Heslin.

Cavan
Rank	Player	Tally	Total	Matches	Average
1	Gearóid McKiernan	1–20 (0–5 frees, 0–1 mark)	23		
2	Paddy Lynch	0–22 (0–11 frees, 0–1 mark)	22		
3	Raymond Galligan	0–11 (0–7 frees, 0–4 45s')	11		
4	Thomas Galligan	1–7	10		
5	Gerard Smith	0–10	10		

Westmeath
Rank	Player	Tally	Total	Matches	Average
1	John Heslin	2–31 (0–19 frees)	37		
2	Ronan O'Toole	2–10	16		
3	Sam McCartan	1–11	14		
4	Luke Loughlin	0–11 (0–1 frees, 0–1 45')	11		
5	Lorcan Dolan	2–3 (0–1 mark)	9		

=== Officials ===
Derry's Barry Cassidy was the referee for the final. Maurice Deegan of Laois had originally been listed to referee the final of the inaugural competition, but the GAA confirmed a change of referee on 6 July. Deegan was absent for what would have been his final inter-county game after contracting COVID-19.

== Match ==
=== Team news ===
Both teams made one change from the match programme before the game – Niall Carolan replaced Martin Reilly for Cavan, while Sam Duncan replaced Nigel Harte on the Westmeath side.

=== Summary ===
Westmeath became the inaugural winners of the Tailteann Cup, scoring 1–4 without reply in the final 13 minutes to take the trophy.

A red card for Cavan's Thomas Galligan in the 58th minute was the turning point of the game. Cavan were leading by two, 1–13 to 1–11, when Galligan caught Westmeath's Ronan O'Toole with a high frontal shoulder. O'Toole went on to be the man-of-the-match.

=== Details ===
9 July 2022
15:00 IST (UTC+1)

Cavan	1–13 (16) – (20) 2–14 HT: 0–9 – 1–8	Westmeath
Gearóid McKiernan 0–3 (0–1f), Gerard Smith 0–3, Paddy Lynch 0–3, Padraig Faulkner 1–0, Jason McLoughlin 0–1, Oisín Kiernan 0–1, James Smith 0–1, Stephen Smith 0–1	Report	Ronan O'Toole 0–5, John Heslin 0–3 (0–2f), Sam McCartan 0–3 (0–1 '45), Lorcan Dolan 1–0, Kieran Martin 1–0, Luke Loughlin 0–2, Ronan Wallace 0–1

Croke Park, Dublin
Referee: Barry Cassidy (Derry)

Cavan	Westmeath

1	Raymond Galligan (c)
2	Jason McLoughlin
3	Padraig Faulkner
4	Killian Brady		(substituted off) 71'
5	Oisín Kiernan
6	Killian Clarke		(substituted off) 71'
7	Conor Brady		(substituted off) 51'
8	Thomas Galligan	(red card) 58'
9	James Smith
10	Gerard Smith
11	Gearóid McKiernan
12	Conor Moynagh		(substituted off) 66'
20	Niall Carolan
14	Paddy Lynch	(yellow card) 70'
15	Cian Madden		(substituted off) HT'
Substitutes:
16	Gary O'Rourke
13	Martin Reilly		(substituted in) 51'
17	Ciarán Brady
18	Chris Conroy
19	Luke Fortune		(substituted in) 66'
21	Niall Murray
22	Stephen Smith		(substituted in) HT'
23	Cormac O'Reilly		(substituted in) 71'
24	Benjamin Kelly
25	Ryan O'Neill
26	Conor Madden		(substituted in) 71'
Manager:
Mickey Graham

1	Jason Daly
2	Jack Smith
3	Kevin Maguire (c)
4	Jamie Gonoud
5	James Dolan	(yellow card) 41'
6	Ronan Wallace
22	Sam Duncan
8	Jonathan Lynam		(substituted off) 58'
9	Ray Connellan
10	Sam McCartan
11	Ronan O'Toole
12	David Lynch
13	Luke Loughlin		(substituted off) 70'
14	John Heslin
15	Lorcan Dolan		(substituted off) 60'
Substitutes:
16	Trevor Martin
7	Nigel Harte
17	Ger Egan		(substituted in) 58'
18	Kieran Martin		(substituted in) 60'
19	Alex Gardiner		(substituted in) 70'
20	Robbie Forde
21	Charlie Drumm
23	Conor Dillon
24	David Giles
25	Andy McCormack
26	Kevin O'Sullivan
Manager:
Jack Cooney

== Aftermath ==
Thousands of people came out to celebrate in Mullingar after Westmeath's victory over Cavan in the final.

The losing Cavan players received their medals at the Hotel Kilmore on 30 October 2022, alongside their Ulster winners medals from 2020.

The winning Westmeath players received their medals at the Mullingar Park Hotel on 2 December 2022, alongside medals given to the winners of the 2008 National Football League Division 2 title (they had not received them for 14 years) and the hurlers who won the 2021 Joe McDonagh Cup.
