= 2025 Westmeath county football team season =

Westmeath county football team
2025 season
- Manager: Dermot McCabe
- Stadium: Cusack Park, Mullingar
- NFL D2: 8th (relegated)
- Tailteann Cup: Quarter-finalist
- Leinster SFC: Quarter-finalist

The following is a summary of Westmeath county football team's 2025 season.

== Personnel changes ==
James Dolan announced his retirement in June 2024.

Captain Kevin Maguire announced his retirement in August 2024. David Lynch and Andy McCormack were unavailable for the 2025 season because of being abroad.

Future manager Mark McHugh was appointed as coach in October 2024 when Dermot McCabe arrived for his brief tenure of fewer than ten months.

== Competitions ==
=== National Football League ===
Westmeath played in Division 2, but ended the season bottom and relegated.

==== Fixtures ====
26 January 2025 Round 1	Westmeath	0-18 (18) – (20) 1-17	Louth	Mullingar
14:00 IST (UTC+1)		(HT: 0-8 - 0-9)		Venue: Cusack Park
	Pts: L Loughlin 0-12 (2tp, 1tpf, 3f), R Wallace 0-3, R Forde 0-2 (1f), S Smith 0-1	Report	Gls: S Reynolds 1 Pts: S Mulroy 0-5 (1tpf, 2f), C Downey 0-2, A McDonnell 0-2, R Burns 0-2 (tp), P Lynch 0-2, D McConnon 0-2 (1f), C Lennon 0-1, T Durnin 0-1	Referee: Barry Tiernan (Dublin)

2 February 2025 Round 2	Monaghan	2-29 (35) – (27) 2-21	Westmeath	Clones
14:00 IST (UTC+1)		(HT: 1-15 - 1-9)		Venue: St Tiernach's Park
	Gls: J McCarron 1, R O'Toole 1 Pts: C McCarthy 0-7, S Mooney 0-6 (1tp, 3f), D Garland 0-5 (1tp, 1f, 1m), R Beggan 0-4 (2tpf), J McCarron 0-2, R McAnespie 0-2, C McNulty 0-1, K Lavelle 0-1, M Hamill 0-1	Report	Gls: R Forde 1, R Wallace 1 Pts: L Loughlin 0-10 (3tp, 2f), S McCartan 0-3 (1tp), R Forde 0-2 (1f), M Whittaker 0-2, B Cooney 0-1, C Dillon 0-1, B Kelly 0-1, E McCabe 0-1	Referee: Kiernan Eannetta (Tyrone)

15 February 2025 Round 3	Cork	3-18 (27) – (26) 3-17	Westmeath	Cork
17:00 IST (UTC+1)		(HT: 1-10 - 1-9)		Venue: Pairc Ui Chaoimh
	Gls: C Og Jones 3 Pts: C Og Jones 0-4, B O'Driscoll 0-4 (1tp), S McDonnell 0-3 (1tp), C O'Callaghan 0-2, E McSweeney 0-2 (tp), M Cronin 0-2 (1f), C O'Mahony 0-1	Report	Gls: S McCartan 1, R Wallace 1, M Whittaker 1 Pts: D McCartan 0-6 (3tp), S McCartan 0-3 (1tp), L Dolan 0-3, R Wallace 0-1, C Dillon 0-1, L Loughlin 0-1 (f), R Forde 0-1, B Kelly 0-1	Referee: Brendan Griffin (Kerry)

23 February 2025 Round 4	Westmeath	0-21 (21) – (25) 1-22	Cavan	Mullingar
14:00 IST (UTC+1)		(HT: 0-17 - 0-5)		Venue: Cusack Park
	Pts: D McCartan 0-6 (2tpf, 1f), L Loughlin 0-6 (1tpf, 1tp, 1f), K O'Sullivan 0-2, R Wallace 0-2 (tp), B Cooney 0-1, M Whittaker 0-1, L Dolan 0-1, C Dillon 0-1, B Kelly 0-1	Report	Gls: G Smith 1, Pts: G McKiernan 0-5 (1tpf, 3f), D McVeety 0-4 (2tp), O Brady 0-4 (1tpf, 1f), J Smith 0-3, C Madden 0-2, D Lovett 0-2 (tp), O Kiernan 0-1	Referee: Derek O'Mahoney (Tipperary)

2 March 2025 Round 5	Westmeath	1-17 (20) – (23) 3-14	Meath	Mullingar
15:15 IST (UTC+1)		(HT: 0-9 - 2-8)		Venue: Cusack Park
	Gls: K Martin 1 Pts: L Loughlin 0-6 (1tpf, 1f), R Forde 0-3 (2f), M Whittaker 0-2, D McCartan 0-1, B Cooney 0-1, C Dillon 0-1, S McCartan 0-1, L Dolan 0-1, B Kelly 0-1	Report	Gls: C Duke 1, J Morris 1, A O'Neill 1 Pts: E Frayne 0-4 (2f), C Duke 0-3, J Morris 0-3 (1tp), J Flynn 0-3 (1tp), B Menton 0-1	Referee: Barry Judge (Sligo)

15 March 2025 Round 6	Down	1-26 (29) – (28) 0-28	Westmeath	Newry
18:00 IST (UTC+1)		(HT: 1-10 - 0-14)		Venue: Pairc Esler
	Gls: J McGeough 1 Pts: P Havern 0-13 (3tp, 1tp, 3f), S Millar 0-3, A Crimmins 0-2, M Rooney 0-2, O Murdock 0-2, R McEvoy 0-1, J Guinness 0-1, D Guinness 0-1, J McGeough 0-1	Report	Pts: J Morris 0-9 (5f, 1tp, 1tpf), E Frayne (4f, 1tpf), B Menton 0-2, R Jones 0-2 (tp), S Walsh 0-1, J Flynn 0-1, C Caulfield 0-1, B Hogan 0-1 ('45)	Referee: Sean Lonergan (Tipperary)

23 March 2025 Round 7	Westmeath	1-19 (22) – (22) 2-16	Roscommon	Mullingar
13:30 IST (UTC+1)		(HT: 1-5 - 2-10)		Venue: Cusack Park
	Gls: L Loughlin 1 Pts: R Connellan 0-7 (3tp), L Loughlin 0-2 (2'45), B Cooney 0-2, E McCabe 0-2 (tp), K Martin (tp), S McCartan 0-2 (1'45), R Forde 0-1, M Whittaker 0-1	Report	Gls: C Murtagh 1, D Murtagh 1 Pts: C Murtagh 0-6 (2f), D Cregg 0-3, C McKeon 0-3, E Smith 0-2, C Lennon 0-1, C Cox 0-1 (f)	Referee: Jerome Henry (Mayo)

==== Table ====
Pos	Team	Pld	W	D	L	PF	PA	PD	Pts	Qualification
1	Monaghan	7	5	0	2	193	161	+32	10	Advance to NFL Division 2 Final and promotion to 2026 NFL Division 1
2	Roscommon	7	4	1	2	161	142	+19	9	Advance to NFL Division 2 Final and promotion to 2026 NFL Division 1
3	Meath	7	4	0	3	162	157	+5	8	
4	Cavan	7	4	0	3	153	159	−6	8	
5	Cork	7	4	0	3	151	158	−7	8	
6	Louth (Note: Louth are ranked ahead of Down as they won the head-to-head game between the teams.)	7	3	0	4	143	157	−14	6	
7	Down	7	3	0	4	138	149	−11	6	Relegation to 2026 NFL Division 3
8	Westmeath	7	0	1	6	162	181	−19	1	Relegation to 2026 NFL Division 3

Source: GAA.ie
Rules for classification: Tiebreakers

=== Leinster Senior Football Championship ===
Westmeath exited at the quarter-final stage.

==== Fixtures ====
12 April 2025 Quarter-final	Kildare	2-17 – 0-21	Westmeath	Newbridge
				Venue: St Conleth's Park
	Gls: David Hyland 1, Alex Beirne 1 Pts: David Hyland 2 (1tp), Colm Dalton 1, Alex Beirne 5 (3fs), Ben McCormack 2, Ryan Sinkey 2, Darragh Kirwan 1, Brian McLoughlin 2 (1tp)	Report	Pts: Jamie Gonoud 1, Sam McCartan 1, Ray Connellan 1, Kevin O'Sullivan 1, Danny McCartan 3, Robbie Forde 2, Luke Loughlin 11 (1tp, 1tpf, 1f)	Referee: David Gough (Meath)

==== Bracket ====
Preliminary round
5 April, Wexford
Wexford	2-11
Laois	2-21
6 April, Longford
Longford	1-20
Wicklow	2-23
6 April, Navan
Meath	1-30
Carlow	0-19

Quarter-finals
12 April, Newbridge
Kildare	2-17
Westmeath	0-21
13 April, Newbridge
Louth	2-16
Laois	1-17
13 April, Newbridge
Dublin	2-21
Wicklow	0-18
13 April, Navan
Offaly	0-21
Meath	1-25

Semi-finals
27 April, Tullamore
Kildare	0-18
Louth	1-18
27 April, Portlaoise
Dublin	1-16
Meath	0-23

Final
11 May, Dublin
Louth	3-14
Meath	1-18

=== Tailteann Cup ===
Westmeath finished second in Group 3, thus qualifying for a preliminary quarter-final.

7 June 2025 Preliminary quarter-final	Westmeath	3-26 – 1-15	Laois	Mullingar
17:00		Report		Stadium: TEG Cusack Park; Referee: Martin McNally (Monaghan)

15 June 2025 Quarter-final	Wicklow	2-18 – 2-17	Westmeath	Aughrim
13:15		Report		Stadium: Echelon Park
