= Kieran Martin =

Irish hurler and Gaelic footballer

Personal information
- Native name: Ciarán Ó Máirtín (Irish)
- Born: 1990 (age 35–36) Drumraney, County Westmeath
- Height: 5 ft 11 in (180 cm)

Sport
- Sport: Gaelic football
Clubs
- Years: Club
- Maryland (football); Father Dalton's, Ballymore (hurling)
Inter-county
- Years: County
- 2009–2025: Westmeath

Kieran Martin (born 1990 in Drumraney, County Westmeath) is an Irish dual player who has played both Gaelic football and hurling with his local club Maryland and was a member of the Westmeath senior inter-county team in both codes from 2009. He announced his retirement from inter-county football in November 2025.

== Playing career ==
Martin first appeared for Westmeath's senior footballers when Tomás Ó Flatharta was manager in 2009, while still a Leaving Certificate student.

Martin played in the 2015 Leinster Senior Football Championship final, contributing two points in the loss. He had earlier come to prominence with a score of 2–3 against Meath in that year's Leinster semi-final.

He played in the 2016 Leinster Senior Football Championship final.

Martin was a playing member of the team that defeated Dublin at Parnell Park in the 2019 O'Byrne Cup final, his county's first time to win that trophy since 1988. He won his second piece of silverware of 2019 when Westmeath won the 2019 National Football League Division 3 league title by a goal against Laois at Croke Park, Martin scored 0–1. He spent two years as Westmeath captain until Kevin Maguire succeeded him from May 2021.

His 2021 season came to an end after he sustained a rupture to his left achilles tendon during a National Football League fixture against Down.

He scored a decisive goal in the 2022 Tailteann Cup final. It came days after the death of close friend Eoin Farrell.

Martin retired from inter-county football in November 2025.

He is among his county's highest championship scorers.

== Honours ==
Westmeath

- Tailteann Cup (1): 2022
- National Football League Division 3 (1): 2019
- O'Byrne Cup (1): 2019
