= Sam Duncan =

Westmeath Gaelic footballer

Sport
- Sport: Gaelic football
Club
- Years: Club
- Milltownpass
Inter-county
- Years: County
- Westmeath

Sam Duncan is a Gaelic footballer who plays for Milltownpass and at senior level for the Westmeath county team. He plays primarily as a defender, but he has also played in midfield and as a corner-forward.

He was a member of the team that defeated Dublin at Parnell Park in the 2019 O'Byrne Cup final, his county's first time to win that trophy since 1988. He won his second piece of silverware of 2019 when Westmeath won the 2019 National Football League Division 3 league title by a goal against Laois at Croke Park.

Duncan was part of the Westmeath side that won the 2022 Tailteann Cup, playing in the final.

After 2023 ended, he went off on his travels.

== Honours ==
Westmeath

- Tailteann Cup (1): 2022
- National Football League Division 3 (1): 2019
- O'Byrne Cup (1): 2019
