= David Lynch (Gaelic footballer) =

Westmeath Gaelic footballer

Personal information
- Occupation: Teacher

Sport
Inter-county
- Years: County
- Westmeath

David Lynch is a Gaelic footballer who plays for St Malachy's and at senior level for the Westmeath county team.

== Playing career ==
He played in the 2015 Leinster Senior Football Championship final.

He played in the 2016 Leinster Senior Football Championship final.

Lynch was a member of the team that defeated Dublin at Parnell Park in the 2019 O'Byrne Cup final, his county's first time to win that trophy since 1988. He won his second piece of silverware of 2019 when Westmeath won the 2019 National Football League Division 3 title by a goal against Laois at Croke Park.

Lynch later won the 2022 Tailteann Cup, and played in the final.

He captained Westmeath for the first time in the 2024 National League victory over Offaly. He played in the 2024 NFL Division 3 final as Westmeath claimed the title.

Lynch is a teacher by trade.

== Honours ==
Westmeath

- Tailteann Cup (1): 2022
- National Football League Division 3 (2): 2019, 2024
- O'Byrne Cup (1): 2019
