= Nigel Harte =

Westmeath Gaelic footballer

Sport
- Sport: Gaelic football
Club
- Years: Club
- Tyrrellspass
Inter-county
- Years: County
- Westmeath

Nigel Harte is a Gaelic footballer who plays for Tyrrellspass and at senior level for the Westmeath county team.

== Playing career ==
Harte was a U20 player in the 2018 All-Ireland Under-20 Football Championship.

Harte won the 2022 Tailteann Cup. He was put in to the team for playing in the final and was going to be the only change from the semi-final instead of Sam Duncan and then Duncan played. He played his part earlier against Laois when he rounded the keeper and got fouled and got a penalty.

He made a substitute appearance in the 2024 NFL Division 3 final as Westmeath claimed the title.

== Honours ==
Westmeath

- Tailteann Cup (1): 2022
- National Football League Division 3 (1): 2024
