= Ronan O'Toole =

Westmeath Gaelic footballer

Personal information
- Occupation: Analyst with JP Morgan

Sport
- Sport: Gaelic football
Club
- Years: Club
- St Loman's
Inter-county
- Years: County
- Westmeath

Ronan O'Toole is a Gaelic footballer for St Loman's and Westmeath.

He was a member of the team that defeated Dublin at Parnell Park in the 2019 O'Byrne Cup final, his county's first time to win that trophy since 1988. He won his second piece of silverware of 2019 when Westmeath won the 2019 National Football League Division 3 league title by a goal against Laois at Croke Park, O'Toole scored 0–2.

He was man of the match in the 2022 Tailteann Cup Final. He scored five points from play and was nominated for Footballer of the Week on GAA.ie.

O'Toole was also involved in the game's turning point when Cavan's Tomás Galligan charged at him with his shoulder and hit him straight into the face. The referee had no option but to wipe out his cards and show Galligan the red one for this offence.

As of 2022, O'Toole was an analyst with JP Morgan.

He played in the 2024 NFL Division 3 final as Westmeath claimed the title.

== Honours ==
Westmeath

- Tailteann Cup (1): 2022
- National Football League Division 3 (2): 2019, 2024
- O'Byrne Cup (1): 2019

Individual

- Tailteann Cup Player of the Year (1): 2022
- Tailteann Cup Team of the Year (1): 2022
