= Jack Smith (Gaelic footballer) =

Westmeath Gaelic footballer

Sport
- Sport: Gaelic football
Club
- Years: Club
- Skerries Harps
Inter-county
- Years: County
- Dublin/Westmeath

Jack Smith is a Gaelic footballer for Dublin GAA club Skerries Harps and Westmeath. He plays as a cornerback.

== Playing career ==
Smith won the All-Ireland Under-21 Football Championship while playing for Dublin in 2012. He got involved with the senior team when Jim Gavin was manager.

Smith switched county teams and became a Westmeath player in 2019. He lined out against his old team in the 2020 Leinster Senior Football Championship. He was part of the Westmeath team that won the 2022 Tailteann Cup, playing in the final and being named on the Team of the Year for the tournament.

At club level, Smith plays for Dublin GAA club Skerries Harps.

== Personal life ==
His father is Peter Smith, who played as a corner back for Westmeath and Mullingar Shamrocks. Jack Smith is the oldest of three brothers, with his brothers Eoin and Stephen also playing for Skerry Harbs.

== Honours ==
Westmeath

- Tailteann Cup (1): 2022

Individual

- Tailteann Cup Team of the Year (1): 2022
