= Kevin Maguire =

Kevin Maguire may refer to:

- Kevin Maguire (artist) (born 1960), American comic book penciller
- Kevin Maguire (Gaelic footballer)
- Kevin Maguire (ice hockey) (born 1963), former professional ice hockey forward and referee
- Kevin Maguire (journalist) (born 1961), British political journalist
