= 2019 Dr McKenna Cup =

Tournament details
- Province: Ulster
- Year: 2018–19
- Sponsor: Bank of Ireland
- Dates: 15 December 2018 – 19 January 2019
- Teams: 12
- Defending champions: Donegal

Winners
- Champions: Tyrone (16th win)
- Manager: Mickey Harte
- Captain: Peter Harte

Runners-up
- Runners-up: Armagh
- Manager: Kieran McGeeney
- Captain: Rory Grugan

Other
- Matches played: 21
- Website: Ulster GAA

The 2019 Dr McKenna Cup, known for sponsorship reasons as the Bank of Ireland Dr McKenna Cup, was a Gaelic football competition in the province of Ulster for county and university teams. It was held at the beginning of the GAA season.

Twelve teams took part – the nine Ulster county teams and three university teams, i.e. St Mary's University College, Belfast, Queen's University Belfast and Ulster University at Jordanstown (UUJ).

The draw was made on 5 December 2018 with the fixtures confirmed following a meeting of Comhairle Uladh CCC later in the month.

Donegal were the defending champions having defeated Tyrone in the 2018 decider.

Tyrone were the 2019 champions beating Armagh in the final. Tyrone also won all five of their games.

== Competition format ==
Group Stage

The twelve teams are drawn into three sections of four teams, with each section containing three county teams and one university team. Each team plays the other teams in their section once, either home or away. Two points are awarded for a win and one for a draw. The points-ratio method (points for divided by points against) is used to determine the ranking of teams who are level on section points (as opposed to the more typical scoring differential).

Knock-out Stage

The winners of the three sections and the best of the runners-up in the three sections compete in the semi-finals with the two winners meeting in the final.

== Experimental rules ==
On 24 November 2018 the GAA Central Council approved five experimental changes to the football playing rules which were amended slightly and trialled in the 2018–19 early season competitions organised by the four provincial councils (FBD League - Connacht, O'Byrne Cup - Leinster, McGrath Cup - Munster and McKenna Cup - Ulster).

The rules trialled were –

1. The maximum number of consecutive handpasses allowed is three.
2. A sideline free must be kicked forward except when it is inside the opposing team's 20 metre line.
3. An advanced mark (sometimes also referred to as an attacking mark, inside mark or offensive mark) may be taken where the ball is kicked in the area outside the opposing team's 45 metre line, travels more than 20 metres, and is caught cleanly without touching the ground in the area inside the opposing team's 45 metre line by an attacker or a defender. Up to fifteen seconds are allowed for the free resulting from the mark to be taken.
4. Ten minutes in a sin bin without replacement is imposed on a player who commits a black card offence. The offending player can re-enter the game or be substituted after the ten minutes have elapsed.
5. Kickouts must be taken from the 20 metre line but are not required to travel beyond the 45 metre line.

The effectiveness of the new rules was reviewed by Central Council on 19 January 2019. Although one of the key aims of the experiment was to reduce the number of handpasses in Gaelic football, they voted 25-23 to not continue with the rule that restricted the number of consecutive handpasses to three (which was previously trialled in the 1989 National Football League and quickly abandoned). This decision followed an almost universal campaign by GAA county team managers in the media against its permanent introduction The Gaelic Players Association (GPA) were also strongly against the three handpass rule.

The remaining four experimental rules were trialled in the 2019 National Football League which began on 26 January 2019 and ended on 31 March 2019. There was little criticism of the four rules in the league games. Jim Gavin, the Dublin manager, said the decision to experiment in the league, the GAA's second tier inter-county competition, was "disrespectful".

GAA rules only allow changes to the playing rules in years divisible by five which means that, at the earliest, the experimental playing rules could only be approved by Congress 2020 for implementation in the 2020 Championship.

The three handpass rule was not used in the Dr. McKenna Cup final. Both Tyrone and Armagh agreed to play without the rule as it had been abandoned by Central Council in the hours just before the final.

== Group stage ==
=== Section A ===
Pos	Team	Pld	W	D	L	PF	PA	PR	Pts	Qualification
1	Donegal	3	3	0	0	64	36	1.778	6	Advance to semi-final
2	Cavan	3	2	0	1	45	38	1.184	4	
3	Down	3	1	0	2	52	41	1.268	2	
4	Queen's University	3	0	0	3	22	68	0.324	0	

Updated to match(es) played on 9 January 2019. Source: Ulster GAA

30 December 2018 Round 1	Cavan	0-13 (13) – (12) 1-09	Down	Cavan
14:00 GMT (UTC+0)				Venue: Breffni Park
		Report		Referee: Martin McNally (Monaghan)

30 December 2018 Round 1	Donegal	0-21 (21) – (11) 0-11	Queen's University	Ballybofey
14:00 GMT (UTC+0)				Venue: Páirc MacCumhaill
		Report		Referee: Niall McKenna

6 January 2019 Round 2	Down	0-10 (10) – (20) 1-17	Donegal	Newry
14:00 GMT (UTC+0)				Venue: Páirc Esler
		Report

6 January 2019 Round 2	Cavan	0-17 (17) – (03) 0-03	Queen's University	Ballyconnell
14:00 GMT (UTC+0)				Venue: First Ulster Park

9 January 2019 Round 3	Donegal	1-20 (23) – (15) 1-12	Cavan	Ballybofey
20:00 GMT (UTC+0)				Venue: Páirc MacCumhaill

9 January 2019 Round 3	Down	4-18 (30) – (08) 1-05	Queen's University	Newry
20:00 GMT (UTC+0)				Venue: Páirc Esler

=== Section B ===
Pos	Team	Pld	W	D	L	PF	PA	PR	Pts	Qualification
1	Armagh	3	3	0	0	75	35	2.143	6	Advance to semi-final
2	Monaghan	3	1	1	1	52	45	1.156	3	
3	Antrim	3	1	0	2	45	59	0.763	2	
4	St Mary's	3	0	1	2	36	69	0.522	1	

Updated to match(es) played on 9 January 2019. Source: Ulster GAA

16 December 2018 Round 1	Armagh	6-17 (35) – (10) 1-07	St. Mary's University College	Crossmaglen
13:00 GMT (UTC+0)				Venue: St Oliver Plunkett Park
		Report

29 December 2018 Round 1	Monaghan	1-20 (23) – (15) 1-12	Antrim	Clones
14:00 GMT (UTC+0)		(HT: 0-11 – 0-06)		Venue: St. Tiernach's Park
	Gls: J Mealiff 1 Pts: J McCarron 5 (4f), M Bannigan 4 (3f), B McGinn 3, D Freeman 2, R McAnespie 1, J Walshe 1, B Kerr 1, C Lennon 1, R Beggan 1f, J Mealiff 1	Report	Gls: N Delargy 1 Pts: R Murray 6 (3f), P McBride 2f, R McCann 1, C Duffin 1, P McCormack 1, E McCabe 1	Referee: N Mooney (Cavan)

6 January 2019 Round 2	Monaghan	1-14 (17) – (17) 0-17	St. Mary's University College	Clones
14:00 GMT (UTC+0)				Venue: St Tiernach's Park

6 January 2019 Round 2	Antrim	1-10 (13) – (27) 2-21	Armagh	Belfast
14:00 GMT (UTC+0)				Venue: Corrigan Park

9 January 2019 Round 3	Antrim	1-14 (17) – (09) 0-09	St. Mary's University College	Belfast
20:00 GMT (UTC+0)				Venue: Woodlands Playing Fields

9 January 2019 Round 3	Armagh	0-13 (13) – (12) 1-09	Monaghan	Armagh
20:00 GMT (UTC+0)				Venue: Athletic Grounds

=== Section C ===
Pos	Team	Pld	W	D	L	PF	PA	PR	Pts	Qualification
1	Tyrone	3	3	0	0	50	27	1.852	6	Advance to semi-final
2	Derry	3	2	0	1	52	41	1.268	4	Advance to semi-final (best runners-up)
3	Fermanagh	3	0	1	2	30	40	0.750	1	
4	Ulster University	3	0	1	2	31	55	0.564	1	

Updated to match(es) played on 9 January 2019. Source: Ulster GAA

15 December 2018 Round 1	Fermanagh	1-09 (12) – (12) 0-12	University of Ulster	Derrygonnelly
13:00 GMT (UTC±0)				Venue: Canon Maguire Park
		Report

20 December 2018 Round 1	Derry	0-11 (11) – (20) 0-20	Tyrone	Derry
20:00 GMT (UTC±0)				Venue: Páirc na gCeilteach

6 January 2019 Round 2	Fermanagh	2-08 (14) – (18) 3-09	Derry	Enniskillen
14:00 GMT (UTC±0)				Venue: Brewster Park
		Report		Referee: Martin McNally

6 January 2019 Round 2	Tyrone	2-14 (20) – (12) 1-09	University of Ulster	Omagh
14:00 GMT (UTC±0)				Venue: Healy Park
		Report

9 January 2019 Round 3	Tyrone	0-10 (10) – (04) 0-04	Fermanagh	Omagh
20:00 GMT (UTC±0)				Venue: Healy Park

9 January 2019 Round 3	Derry	1-20 (23) – (07) 0-07	University of Ulster	Dungiven
20:00 GMT (UTC±0)				Venue: Owenbeg Centre of Excellence

=== Ranking of section runners-up ===
Pos	Grp	Team	Pld	W	D	L	PF	PA	PR	Pts	Qualification
1	C	Derry	3	2	0	1	52	41	1.268	4	Advance to semi-final
2	A	Cavan	3	2	0	1	45	38	1.184	4	
3	B	Monaghan	3	1	1	1	52	45	1.156	3	

Updated to match(es) played on 9 January 2019. Source: Ulster GAA

== Knock-out Stage ==
=== Semi-finals ===
13 January 2019
14:00 GMT (UTC±0)
Semi-Final 1

Report

Donegal	1-10 (13) – (14) 0-14	Armagh
(HT: 1-05 – 0-09)

Healy Park, Omagh
Referee: Paul Faloon (Down)

13 January 2019
14:00 GMT (UTC±0)
Semi-Final 2

Report

Tyrone	0-14 (14) – (11) 1-08	Derry
(HT: 0-06 – 0-06)

Athletic Grounds, Armagh
Referee: C Branagan (Down)

=== Final ===
TG4

19 January 2019
19:30 GMT (UTC±0)
Final

Report

Armagh	0-14 (14) – (16) 0-16	Tyrone
(HT: 0-06 – 0-09)
Pts: Rory Grugan (5, 4f, 1pen), Niall Grimley (5, 4f, 1 '45), Stefan Campbell (2), Rian O’Neill, Jamie Clarke		Pts: Darren McCurry (9, 8f), Niall Sludden (2), Cathal McShane (2, 1f), Ronan McNamee, Declan McClure, Niall Morgan (f)

Athletic Grounds, Armagh
Referee: Joe McQuillan (Cavan)
Attendance: 11,318
