= James Dolan (Gaelic footballer) =

Westmeath Gaelic footballer

Sport
- Sport: Gaelic football
Club
- Years: Club
- Garrycastle
Inter-county
- Years: County
- until 2024: Westmeath

James Dolan is a Gaelic footballer who plays for Garrycastle and at senior level for the Westmeath county team.

== Playing career ==
Dolan scored several important goals while playing for Westmeath.

He played in the 2015 Leinster Senior Football Championship final.

He played in the 2016 Leinster Senior Football Championship final.

He was a member of the team that defeated Dublin at Parnell Park in the 2019 O'Byrne Cup final, his county's first time to win that trophy since 1988. He won his second piece of silverware of 2019 when Westmeath won the 2019 National Football League Division 3 league title by a goal against Laois at Croke Park.

He played in the 2024 NFL Division 3 final as Westmeath claimed the title.

He spent 13 years playing for Westmeath before retiring from inter-county football in 2024. He was a defender.

== Honours ==
Westmeath

- Tailteann Cup (1): 2022
- National Football League Division 3 (2): 2019, 2024
- O'Byrne Cup (1): 2019
