= Thomas Galligan =

Irish Gaelic footballer

Personal information
- Native name: Tomás Ó Gealagáin (Irish)
- Born: 15 September 1996 (age 30)

Sport
- Sport: Gaelic football
- Position: Midfield
Club
- Years: Club
- Lacken
Inter-county
- Years: County
- 2017–2022: Cavan
Inter-county titles
- Ulster titles: 1
- All Stars: 1

Thomas Galligan (born 15 September 1996) is an Irish Gaelic footballer who plays for the Cavan county team. He plays his club football with Lacken.

== Playing career ==
=== College ===
Galligan went to school at St Patrick's College in Cavan. Galligan starred in the 2015 season as St Pat's reached their first MacRory Cup final since 1975. On 17 March 2015, Galligan started in midfield in the final against St Patrick's Academy, Dungannon. Galligan scored two points as Cavan were winners by 2–12 to 0–8. He also received the man of the match award. Galligan played in the Hogan Cup semi-final against PBS Chorca Dhuibhne, where St Pat's suffered a three-point loss.

=== Club ===
Galligan has played with Lacken from a young age. He has yet to win a championship medal at senior level.

=== Inter-county ===
==== Minor and under-21 ====
Galligan represented Cavan at minor and under-21 level, but had little success at either grade.

==== Senior ====
Galligan joined the Cavan senior squad ahead of the 2017 season. On 25 June 2017 he made his championship debut as a substitute in a qualifier against Offaly.

On 18 May 2019, Galligan made his first championship start for Cavan at full forward in an Ulster championship win against Monaghan. On 23 June, Galligan came on as a substitute in the Ulster final loss to Donegal.

On 31 October 2020, Galligan came on as a half-time substitute against Monaghan in the Ulster preliminary round, with Cavan seven points behind. Cavan eventually won by one point after extra-time with Galligan being named man of the match. On 22 November, Galligan started in midfield in the Ulster final against Donegal. Galligan was named man of the match as Cavan won their first Ulster title since 1997. Galligan was sent off late in the game as Cavan lost the All-Ireland semi-final to Dublin. After the All-Ireland final, Galligan was named on The Sunday Game Team of the Year. Galligan was later selected at midfield on the All Star team.

On 2 April 2022, Galligan started the National League Division 4 final against Tipperary at Croke Park, with Cavan coming out winners on a 2–10 to 0–15 scoreline. On 5 June, Galligan top-scored with 1–4 from play in a Tailteann Cup quarter-final win against Fermanagh. Galligan started the final against Westmeath on 9 July. Galligan was sent off in the 58th minute for a challenge on Westmeath's Ronan O'Toole. Westmeath went on to win the match by 2–14 to 1–13.

In September 2022, it was reported that Galligan wouldn't feature for Cavan in 2023, as he was planning to go travelling to Australia.

== Honours ==
Cavan

- Ulster Senior Football Championship: 2020
- National Football League Division 4: 2022

St. Patrick's College Cavan

- MacRory Cup: 2015

Individual

- All Star Award: 2020
- The Sunday Game Team of the Year: 2020
- Irish News Ulster Footballer of the Year: 2020
- Irish News Ulster All-Star: 2020
- GAA/GPA Footballer of the Month: November 2020
