= Lorcan Dolan =

Westmeath Gaelic footballer

Sport
- Sport: Gaelic football
- Position: Forward
Club
- Years: Club
- Castledaly
Inter-county
- Years: County
- Westmeath

Lorcan Dolan is a Gaelic footballer who plays for Castledaly and the Westmeath county team.

He scored a goal against Laois in the 2021 Leinster Senior Football Championship.

He is a former student of Moate CS.

His goal, which put Westmeath into the lead against Cavan in the 2022 Tailteann Cup final, was the first goal scored in a Tailteann Cup final.

He made a substitute appearance in the 2024 NFL Division 3 final as Westmeath claimed the title.

== Honours ==
Westmeath

- Tailteann Cup (1): 2022
- National Football League Division 3 (1): 2024
