= Jason McLoughlin =

Cavan Gaelic footballer

Personal information
- Native name: Iasón Mac Lochlainn (Irish)
- Born: 7 December 1992 (age 33)
- Occupation: Recruitment Consultant
- Height: 6 ft 0 in (183 cm)

Sport
- Sport: Gaelic Football
- Position: Corner Back/Wing Back
Club
- Years: Club
- Shannon Gaels
Inter-county
- Years: County
- 2012–: Cavan
Inter-county titles
- Ulster titles: 1

Jason McLoughlin (born 7 December 1992) is an Irish Gaelic footballer who plays for the Cavan county team. He plays his club football with Shannon Gaels.

== Playing career ==
=== Club ===
On 29 September 2019, McLoughlin lined out at centre back as Shannon Gaels faced Killinkere in the final of the Cavan Junior Football Championship. McLoughlin scored 1-3 and was named 'man of the match' despite Killinkere coming out on top by five points.

=== Inter-county ===
==== Minor and under-21 ====
McLoughlin first played for Cavan at minor level, but Cavan were unsuccessful in that period.

On 11 April 2012, McLoughlin was at corner back as the Cavan under-21 team faced Tyrone in the Ulster Final. An early goal helped Cavan to a 1–10 to 0–10 win. On 21 April, McLoughlin started in the All-Ireland semi-final, where Cavan were edged out by Roscommon.

On 10 April 2013, McLoughlin started his second consecutive Ulster Final, this time against Donegal. Cavan were winners on a 0–13 to 1-6 scoreline. On 20 April, Cavan faced Cork in the All-Ireland semi-final, with Cork coming out on top by one point.

==== Senior ====
McLoughlin joined the senior squad in 2012. On 20 May 2012 McLoughlin made his championship debut in an Ulster quarter-final loss to Donegal.

On 4 August 2013, McLoughlin started the All-Ireland quarter-final where Cavan faced Kerry at Croke Park. Kerry were winners by six points.

On 3 April 2016, McLoughlin was at corner back against Galway in the National League as Cavan earned promotion to the top flight for the first time in 15 years. On 24 April, McLoughlin started the Division 2 Final against Tyrone, scoring a point in the five point loss.

On 1 April 2018, McLoughlin was at corner back as Cavan faced Roscommon in the National League Division 2 Final. Roscommon were winners on a 4–16 to 4–12 scoreline.

McLoughlin was at corner back as Cavan bridged an 18-year gap to reach an Ulster final after defeating Armagh on 9 June 2019. On 23 June 2019, McLoughlin started the Ulster Final as Cavan lost by five points to Donegal.

On 22 November 2020, McLoughlin was at corner back as Cavan faced Donegal in the Ulster Final for the second year in a row. McLoughlin scored a point as Cavan bridged a 23-year gap with a 1–13 to 0–12 win. On 5 December, McLoughlin started the All-Ireland semi-final, where Cavan exited the championship to eventual champions Dublin.

On 2 April 2022, McLoughlin was at wing back as Cavan faced Tipperary in the National League Division 4 final at Croke Park. Cavan came out winners on a 2–10 to 0-15 scoreline. McLoughlin also started the Tailteann Cup final against Westmeath on 9 July. McLoughlin scored a point but Westmeath finished strongly and came out four-point winners. McLoughlin was named on the first ever Tailteann Cup Team of the Year at the end of the season.

== Honours ==
Cavan

- Ulster Senior Football Championship (1): 2020
- National Football League Division 4 (1): 2022
- Ulster Under-21 Football Championship (2): 2012, 2013

Individual

- Tailteann Cup Team of the Year (1): 2022
- Irish News Ulster All-Star (1): 2020
