= Milltownpass GAA =

Gaelic games club in County Westmeath, Ireland

Milltownpass
- Bealach Bhaile an Mhuileann
- Founded: 1977
- County: Westmeath
- Nickname: Whittakers
- Colours: Black and White
- Grounds: Milltownpass
- Coordinates: 53°25′01.02″N 7°18′08.80″W

Playing kits
Standard colours

Milltownpass GAA is a Gaelic Athletic Association club located in the town of Milltownpass in County Westmeath, Ireland. It lives in the shadow of its neighbours, St. Mary's, Rochfortridge.

== History ==
The team was founded in 1977 and participates in both men's and women's leagues.

== Notable players ==
- Sam Duncan
