= Barry Cassidy =

Gaelic football referee

Barry Cassidy is a Gaelic football referee. An inter-county championship referee since 2012, Cassidy has been described as the top referee in Ulster. A member of the Derry GAA club Bellaghy, Cassidy refereed the inaugural Tailteann Cup final. Barry is an experienced GAA official. He's a familiar face at GAA games either in the middle or on the line. He takes on many championship games in Ulster and throughout the country.

== Career ==
Cassidy refereed his first Derry Senior Football Championship final in 2010, Coleraine v Ballinderry Shamrocks. He also refereed the 2013 Derry SFC final, won by Ballinderry Shamrocks against Ballinascreen.

Cassidy worked on the 2011 All-Ireland Minor Football Championship, as a linesman.

His first National Football League game came the following year (when he had to be escorted away by stewards after annoying Mayo supporters whose loss that game was).

He was given charge of the 2018 All-Ireland Senior Football Championship semi-final between Dublin and Galway, though he had never previously refereed even a quarter-final before that year, when he had taken charge of Galway v Kerry in the 2018 Super 8s.

Cassidy refereed the 2020 Ulster Senior Football Championship final between Cavan and Donegal.

He took charge of the 2021 Munster Senior Football Championship final between Cork and Kerry.

Even though Maurice Deegan had originally been announced as the 2022 Tailteann Cup Final referee, Cassidy ended up taking charge in Deegan's absence. Deegan had a sickness, said Brian Gavin in his analysis of that game. He had contracted COVID-19 and this ruled him out of what would have been his final inter-county game.

Cassidy was then named as linesman for the 2022 All-Ireland Senior Football Championship Final.

Barry makes many crucial calls in many games. One example was the qf of the 2025 championship between armagh and antrim. Barry managed to spot Ethan Rafferty stopping a goal scoring opportunity. This was the crucial and correct decision.

== Personal life ==
Cassidy's father was a referee. He is a married man, Claire being the wife.
