= Niall Carolan =

Cavan Gaelic footballer

Personal information
- Native name: Néil Ó Cearrluinn (Irish)
- Born: 18 April 2002 (age 24)

Sport
- Sport: Gaelic football
- Position: Half Back
Club
- Years: Club
- 2020–: Cuchulainns
Inter-county
- Years: County
- 2022–: Cavan

Niall Carolan (born 18 April 2002) is an Irish Gaelic footballer who plays for Cuchulainns and the Cavan county team.

== Playing career ==
=== Club ===
Carolan joined the Cuchulainns at a young age and joined the club's senior team in 2020. The club reached the final of the 2025 Intermediate Championship with Carolan scoring a point in their semi-final win over Killinkere. In the final against Butlersbridge, Carolan lined out at centre back, scoring a point as Cuchulainns won their first championship in twenty years.

=== Inter-county ===
==== Minor and under-20 ====
Carolan was captain of the Cavan under-20 team for the 2022 season. On 22 April, Carolan was in the half-back line as Cavan faced Tyrone in the Ulster final. Tyrone came out winners on a 0–11 to 0–10 scoreline.

==== Senior ====
Carolan joined the Cavan senior squad in 2022 after the Ulster under-20 final loss. On 28 May, Carolan made his senior debut in a first round Tailteann Cup win over Down, scoring a point as a second-half substitute. Carolan made his first senior start in the quarter-final win over Fermanagh on 5 June. Cavan went on to face Westmeath in the final on 9 July. Carolan started the game, with Westmeath coming out winners by four points.

On 1 April 2023, Carolan was at corner back as Cavan faced Fermanagh in the National League Division 3 final. Cavan won the match by 0–16 to 1–7.

== Honours ==
Cavan

- National Football League Division 3: 2023

Cuchulainns

- Cavan Intermediate Football Championship: 2025
