= Gerard Smith (Gaelic footballer) =

Gaelic footballer from County Cavan, Ireland

Personal information
- Native name: Gearóid Mac Gabhann (Irish)
- Born: 1994 (age 31–32)
- Occupation: Accountant
- Height: 6 ft 1 in (185 cm)

Sport
- Sport: Gaelic Football
- Position: Wing Back/Wing Forward
Club
- Years: Club
- Lavey
Inter-county
- Years: County
- 2016–: Cavan
Inter-county titles
- Ulster titles: 1

Gerard Smith (born 1994) is an Irish Gaelic footballer who plays for Lavey and the Cavan county team.

== Playing career ==
=== Club ===
Smith has played with Lavey from underage level. He has yet to win a championship medal at senior level.

=== Inter-county ===
==== Minor and U-21 ====
On 17 July 2011, Smith lined out for the Cavan minor team in the Ulster final against Armagh. Smith scored a point in the 0–12 to 1–6 victory. He joined the county Under-21 team in 2013. On 10 April, Smith lined out at wing forward in the Ulster Final against Donegal. Smith scored two points in the 0–13 to 1–6 win. On 20 April, Smith played in the All-Ireland semi-final against Cork, where Cavan suffered a one-point defeat.

On 9 April 2014, Cavan were in the Ulster Final again, and once again faced Donegal. A 2–6 to 0–8 win gave Smith his second Under-21 Championship. On 19 April, Smith played in defence as Cavan controversially lost the All-Ireland semi-final to eventual winners Dublin. On 18 March 2015, Smith's underage career with Cavan came to an end with defeat to Donegal in the first round.

==== Senior ====
Smith joined the senior squad in 2016. On 29 May 2016, he made his championship debut as a substitute in an Ulster championship win over Armagh. On 5 February 2017, he scored two points in his National League debut, a loss to All-Ireland champions Dublin.

On 23 June 2019, Smith started in the Ulster Final as Cavan faced Donegal, with Cavan falling to a five-point defeat. On 22 November 2020, Cavan met Donegal in the Ulster Final for the second year in a row. Smith scored a point as Cavan stunned Donegal to win their first Ulster title since 1997. On 5 December, Smith started the All-Ireland semi-final loss to Dublin. Smith was nominated for an All-Star award for the first time at the end of the season.

On 2 April 2022, Smith was in the half-back line as Cavan faced Tipperary in the National League Division 4 final at Croke Park. Cavan were winners on a 2–10 to 0-15 scoreline. On 9 July, Smith started Tailteann Cup final against Westmeath, scoring three points in the four-point loss. At the end of the season, Smith was named on the Tailteann Cup Team of the Year.

== Honours ==
Cavan

- Ulster Senior Football Championship (1): 2020
- National Football League Division 4 (1): 2022
- Ulster Under-21 Football Championship (2): 2013, 2014
- Ulster Minor Football Championship (1): 2011

Individual

- Tailteann Cup Team of the Year (1): 2022
- Irish News Ulster All-Star (1): 2020
