= Conor Moynagh =

Cavan Gaelic footballer

Personal information
- Native name: Conchúr Múineach (Irish)
- Born: 1992 or 1993 (age 33–34) Sheffield, England
- Occupation: Marketing consultant (as of 2018)
- Height: 5 ft 11 in (180 cm)

Sport
- Sport: Gaelic Football
- Position: Centre Back
Club
- Years: Club
- 2002–: Drumgoon
College
- Years: College
- 2011–2016: DCU
College titles
- Sigerson titles: 1 (2015)
Inter-county
- Years: County
- 2009–2023: Cavan
Inter-county titles
- NFL: 2 titles (Div 4 in 2022, Div 3 in 2023)

Conor Moynagh (born c. 1993) is a Gaelic footballer who played for the Cavan county team, from Minor to Senior, since 2009. He played his club football with Drumgoon Eire Og in Cavan, having also played overseas in Boston, Chicago, Middle East and New Zealand.

He is married to Kerry LGFA player, Ciara Murphy, from Lispole (Lios Póil) on the Dingle peninsula.

== Playing career ==
=== Club ===
Conor Moynagh engaged in a diverse sports life in his early years, winning national titles in athletics in both track and cross country in the juvenile ranks.

In addition, he claimed representative honours in soccer, playing Kennedy Cup (2005 and 2006) and Milk Cup (now Super Cup NI) in 2007, and won a representative 'cap' against Qatar in the same year. As a 16-17 year-old (during Transition Year) he played League of Ireland soccer with Monaghan United.

Moynagh joined his home GAA Club, Drumgoon Eire Og in Cavan as a juvenile footballer at the age of five, having been introduced to the sport through family and his Dernakesh NS primary school Principal (and 38th President of the GAA) Aogán Ó Fearghail He played through the juvenile ranks initially winning two county championships at U12 grade and appearing in a county final at every age grade after this, with the exception of U13. He won a minor club championship in August 2010 with a parish amalgamation – Eire Og Celtics (Drumgoon Eire Og and Cootehill Celtic) – playing at mid-field.

With a diverse background in both athletics (underage All Ireland titles in track and Cross Country) and soccer (FAI Ulster Interprovincial squad, and League of Ireland with Monaghan United) as well as GAA, Moynagh sprang onto the club's senior team in 2010 as a 17-year-old, having already shown significant potential at underage club, colleges and underage county level.

In his debut season(s) at senior club level, he was played in the forward six – typically at wing forward or corner forward and maturing into a more central role between Centre-Back, mid-field and Centre-Forward for the club.

On 2 October 2011, Drumgoon played Crosserlough in the Cavan Intermediate Football Championship final at Kingspan Breffni Park. As an emerging underage Cavan player, Moynagh lined out at half-forward and scored 3 points from play on his way to be named man of the match after their one-point victory over a fancied Crosserlough Team. Moynagh, and his brother Killian were key contributors to the Drumgoon Eire Og Team that won Cavan ACFL Division 3 League titles in 2019, and again in 2023.

He won Middle East League and Championship titles with Naomh Alee GAA Club in Riyadh in 2014, and in New Zealand with Auckland Celtic in 2020.

=== Vocational schools ===
Moynagh played Senior Vocational Schools Football with St Aidans Comprehensive, Cootehill, captaining them to the Cavan Senior Schools title in Kingspan Breffni Park in December 2010, defeating Virginia Vocational School in the final and being named Man of the Match in the process. He played on the Cavan Vocational Schools (County) Team for three years between 2008 and 2011, captaining Cavan in the Ulster – All-Ireland Vocational Schools Championship in 2010–2011.

=== University ===
Conor Moynagh went to Dublin City University in 2011 on a GAA Elite Athlete Scholarship – studying Applied Physics (having previously been the Biology category winner at the National SciFest competition (Young Scientist of the Year), held at Institute Technology Tallaght), and progressing to the School of Human Health and Performance. Moynagh played with the DCU Freshers Team who progressed through the league to defeat Carlow IT (including his Cavan team-mate Joe Dillon) in the 2011 Intervarsity's Division 1 Freshers League final, to secure his first Universities title.

==== Ryan Cup ====
As a student at Dublin City University, Moynagh joined the senior football team in his second year in the 2012–2013 Season. In December 2014, he lined out in his customary centre-back position with DCU to win the Intervarsities Senior Division 1 League (Ryan Cup).

==== Sigerson Cup ====
Later that season, on 21 February 2015, Moynagh again lined out at Centre Back in the DCU starting team that defeated UCD in a compelling semi-final and then faced UCC in the Sigerson Cup final. A keen contest and impressive game at the Mardyke saw Moynagh pick up his first Sigerson medal after a 1–14 to 2–10 win.

The Irish Times commented: "DCU's brand of excellence keeps on refreshing itself and for a long time it seemed certain they would endure. This year's batch has Roscommon forward Smith at the tip of the spear and Cavan defender Conor Moynagh as its heartbeat. Smith had 1–3 on the board inside the first 20 minutes, every inch of it from play. Moynagh ranged forward for one of his own but spent most of his afternoon sweeping and sorting in front of his own D".

==== Independent.ie GAA Rising Star Awards ====
Conor would later pick up his first Sigerson All-Star (Rising Star) Award for the 2014–2015 Sigerson Campaign - named at Centre-Back - presented at Croke Park by An tUachtaran CLG, Aogan OFearghail

On 20 February 2016, Moynagh was again at centre-back for his second consecutive Sigerson final, as DCU sought to defend their crown in Jordanstown, this time against UCD. Moynagh scored a goal from a second half penalty but UCD edged out the holders in a tactical encounter played in difficult conditions on a 0–10 to 2–2 scoreline, seeing UCD Captain, Jack McCaffrey raise the Sigerson Cup.

Moynagh would again be selected on the Rising Stars/Sigerson All-Stars Team of the year for the 2015–16 season following DCU's Ryan Cup and Sigerson Cup final appearances – once again at the Centre-Back position.

During his University years, Moynagh spent time in the US, in Boston, on a GAA sanctioned transfer playing with the Cork Boston and later the Wolfe Tones GAA Club (2012 and 2015 respectively), contesting the Boston GAA Senior Football Final in 2015.

Conor Moynagh Graduated from DCU with his primary degree in Sports Science and Health – BSc(Hon) – in 2016, and pursued his early professional career in Digital Commerce – working in Ireland (Dublin) and New Zealand (Auckland).

=== Inter-county ===
==== Minor ====
Conor Moynagh was a three-year County Minor with Cavan, being selected in 2008 from an U16 Development Squad by the then Cavan Minor Manager, Michael (Mickey) Graham. In his third year as a minor, on 17 July 2011, Moynagh started for the Cavan minor team at Centre-Back in the Ulster final against Armagh. In a close-run final, Cavan were winners on a 0–12 to 1–6 scoreline, with Moynagh selected as the Irish Times Man of the Match in the Final – securing Cavan's first Ulster Minor title in 37 years. The Belfast Telegraph wrote: "Behind by four points at the break, the Cavan boys seemed to be out of the contest as they failed to score in the second quarter, but they were much the better side in the second half as Conor Moynagh drove them forward from centre back with a brilliant individual display to lift the minor title for the first time since 1974".

==== U-21 ====
Moynagh joined the Cavan under-21 team the following year in 2012 and moved directly to the regular starting 15 in his customary central defender position. During this period, the Cavan U21 squad were two time winners and perennial finalists in the Hastings Cup competition.

On 11 April 2012, Moynagh started at centre-back against Tyrone in the Ulster final. An early goal helped Cavan to a 1–10 to 0–10 win. On 21 April, Moynagh started in the All-Ireland semi-final against Roscommon, where Cavan were edged out by Roscommon.

The following year, Moynagh collected his third Ulster Title and second U21 title when Cavan played Donegal in the Ulster U21 final in 2013. Cavan were winners on a 0–13 to 1–6 scoreline. Returning from injury, Moynagh came on as a substitute in the All-Ireland semi-final against Cork on 20 April, where Cavan suffered a narrow one-point loss.

Conor Moynagh was selected as Cavan's under-21 Captain for the 2014 season and secured his fourth Ulster medal and third consecutive U21 title. Cavan played Donegal in the Ulster Final on 9 April. Moynagh accepted the cup after their 2–6 to 0–8 victory. Moynagh was selected the Cavan Crystal Sports Person of the Month for April 2014. Cavan exited the championship after a controversial All-Ireland semi-final loss to eventual winners Dublin. Once again, a one-point defeat prevented an All Ireland Final appearance by Cavan at U21 level.

==== Junior ====
Later in 2014, Moynagh was part of the Cavan Junior Team that won the Leinster Junior Football Championship (in the absence of an Ulster Junior Championship), with a 1-11 to 1-07 win over Longford and later having accounted for Scotland in the Semi-Final proceeded to defeat Kerry by 2:14 to 0:14 in the All-Ireland Junior Football Championship final on 23 August 2014 played at Portlaoise, to secure Cavan's second ever All Ireland Junior title and the first since 1927.

Of his performance on the day, the press wrote: "Having played with a stiff breeze, Cavan led by 1—7 to 0–6 at the break. With Conor Moynagh exerting considerable influence in the 'quarter-back' role, Cavan had a constant supply of quality ball to trigger men Paul O’Connor and Tom Hayes".

This was Cavan's first Football Championship win over Kerry in a final at any grade, since the 1947 All Ireland Senior Championship win in the Polo Grounds in New York.

==== Senior ====
Moynagh made his NFL debut on 15 March 2015 against Galway at Pearse Stadium, Galway and his All Ireland Senior Championship debut on 4 July 2015 against Roscommon.

In 2016, as a constant starter at Centre Back, Moynagh contested the first of four National League Finals with Cavan, against Tyrone in Croke Park in the Division 2 decider - from which he was selected in the 'Team of the League Finals' for 2016. Two years later, in 2018, he and Cavan would contest the National League final against Roscommon at the same venue. He was named at Centre back in the 2016 Cavan Team of the Year

In 2017 Cavan competed in Division 1 of the National Football League, and despite draws with Monaghan and Kerry and an impressive win over All Ireland Finalists Mayo, were destined to compete in Division 2 in the new season. Another impressive season in 2018 saw Cavan again promoted as table-toppers in NFL Division 2, and would contest the National Football League in Division 1 as a precursor to an impressive Championship run to the Ulster Final in 2019.

In 2019, Moynagh starred for Cavan at corner-back in that Ulster Championship campaign, defeating Monaghan in the Quarter Final in Breffni Park and Armagh in the Ulster Semi-Final (replay) in Clones, where he was named Galway Crystal 'Man-of-the-Match'.

His Ulster All-Star nomination script read: "In that free-ranging corner back role, Moynagh exerted considerable influence, as he raided forward from deep, regularly contributing to the Cavan scoring tally. In that campaign he achieved the highest individual player possession count (126) in the 2019 Ulster SFC (over 4 games). He won 12 kick-outs and was an attacking threat with 13 attacks, assisted 1–03 and scored 4 points from play. Conor also had the highest average Performa Sports Rating (PSR) in the full back line for all teams in the Ulster Championship".

On 23 June 2019, Moynagh started in his customary attacking corner back position in his fifth Ulster Final and first senior Ulster Championship Final, where Cavan faced Donegal. Moynagh scored a point from play but Donegal went on to lift the Anglo Celt Cup that day Cavan's championship ended with a defeat to Tyrone in the qualifiers.

At the end of the 2019 season, in addition to his Ulster All-Star and GAA (National) All-Star nominations, Conor Moynagh was selected by Cavan GAA as the Senior County Football Player of the Year.

Moynagh opted out of the Cavan panel ahead of the 2020 season as he was travelling the world. He continued playing football during his period of travel, and won the New Zealand GAA North Island Senior League and Championship double with Auckland Celtic in the 2020/21 season.

Moynagh returned to training with Cavan just ahead of the 2021 championship outing on 10 July, having returned from New Zealand in early June 2021. On 10 July Moynagh started in Cavan's Ulster championship Quarter Final loss to eventual All Ireland winners Tyrone. This result was reversed when Cavan played Tyrone again, in the Dr McKenna Cup round 2 match in January 2022, with Cavan extending a 15 point win over the All Ireland Champions in Kingspan Breffni.

==== Tailteann Cup ====
Emerging as Divisional League winners, Cavan contested the inaugural Tailteann Cup competition in 2022, progressing to a Croke Park Final against Westmeath. Returning to the Cavan starting panel for the final (following an injury sustained in the Ulster Championship campaign against Donegal), Moynagh lined out at corner back. Leading the final for most of the game, a red card for Cavan's Thomas Galligan in the 58th minute was the turning point of the game, which saw Westmeath close out the final minutes to secure a two-point win.

==== NFL Finals ====
Moynagh was part of the Cavan team that contested 4 National Football League Finals between 2016 and 2023. Cavan narrowly lost in two Division 2 League finals to Tyrone (2016) and Roscommon (2018) respectively, before claiming back-to-back NFL honours in 2022 and 2023.

Cavan had already secured promotion from NFL Division 4 to Division 3, when they lined out against Tipperary on 2 April 2022, going on to secure the NFL Divisional Final in Croke Park on a scoreline of 2:10 to 0:15, to give Cavan their first Senior GAA Title win at Croke Park since 1952.

In another strong performance from corner back, Moynagh opened Cavan's scoring at HQ that day en-route to being one of two Cavan Players (with Patrick Lynch) selected on the National League Finals Team of the Week.

The following year, in 2023 Moynagh was again part of the Cavan team that secured promotion, and a second National League title at Croke Park in a 0:16 to 1:07 win over Fermanagh.

In December 2023, The42.ie reported that Moynagh would "not be involved" in Cavan's 2024 season.

=== Inter-provincial ===
In 2016, Pete McGrath selected Moynagh at Centre Back in his Ulster 'Railway Cup' Team. Ulster defeated Munster by 3–17 to 1–15 in the Inter-Provincial Football Semi-Final on Sunday 11 December at Parnell Park, Dublin, and on 17 December 2016 went on to defeat Connacht in the Railway Cup Final played at Pairc Sean MacDiarmada in Carrick-on-Shannon, on a scoreline of 2:16 to 3:10, winning Moynagh his first Interprovincial / Railway Cup title with Ulster.

=== All-star nominations ===
Conor Moynagh won two independent i.e. GAA Football Rising Star (Sigerson All-Star) awards in 2015 and 2016 respectively.

He was nominated for and won an 'Irish News' Ulster GAA Football All-Star Award in 2016 – one of two Cavan All-Star winners that year, with Goal Keeper Raymond Galligan – and was listed on the Joe.ie GAA Football Team of the Year.

Moynagh was again nominated for an 'Irish News' Ulster All Star Award in 2019 and selected on the Performa Sports Ulster All-Star Team for 2019. In 2019, Moynagh was also selected on the 'Pundit Arena' GAA Provincial All Stars Team of the Year at number 4.

To end the 2019 season, Moynagh was nominated as a defender for a PWC/GPA GAA Football All-Star for the first time based on his performances for Cavan in the 2019 Championship season. To date, he is his club's first and only Inter-varsities Rising Star Award Winner, Ulster All-Star Award Winner and PWC GPA GAA All-Star Football nominee.

In November 2022, Moynagh was selected as part of a squad of inter-county GAA & LGFA Players to travel to Kenya with the "Warriors for Humanity All-Stars", as part of the 'Plant the Planet Games'. The initiative sought to prompt sustainable development and economic regeneration through investment in people, processes and the planting of 1 million trees.

=== Personal life ===
As of 2018, Conor Moynagh was working as a marketing consultant.

Born in Sheffield, he comes from a family of four children, raised in Cavan and attended DCU where he studied Applied Physics and Sports Science and Health, and graduated with BSc (Hons) in 2016.

His brother Killian also played Sigerson Football (NUI Galway and Queens Belfast) and Senior Championship football, lining out with New York in both 2015 and 2016. The brothers played against each other when Cavan played New York in the Mick Higgins Memorial Tournament in Gaelic Park, New York in 2015.

Conor Moynagh's father, Patrick, is a past chairman of the Middle East GAA and recipient of the GAA President's International Award in 2024.

Conor Moynagh is married to Kerry LGFA player and Lispole (Kerry) & Foxrock-Cabinteely (Dublin) club-player Ciara Murphy. Murphy captained the UCD Team to the Intervarsity's O'Connor Cup title in 2016.

== Honours ==
Ulster

- GAA Interprovincial Championship Railway Cup (1) 2016

Cavan

- Leinster Junior Football Championship (1): 2014
- All-Ireland Junior Football Championship (1): 2014
- Ulster Under-21 Football Championship (3): 2012, 2013, 2014 (c)
- Ulster Minor Football Championship (1): 2011
- National Football League (2): 2022 (Division 4 title), 2023 (Division 3 title)

Drumgoon

- Cavan ACFL League Title (1): 2023
- Cavan ACFL League Title (1): 2019
- Cavan Intermediate Football Championship (1): 2011
- Cavan Minor Football Championship (1): 2010

DCU

- Higher Education GAA All-Ireland Div 1 Freshers League (1): 2011/12
- Ryan Cup Inter-Varsity's Senior Div 1 Football League (1): 2014/15
- Sigerson Cup (1): 2015 (runners-up in 2016)

Individual

- Cavan Crystal Sports Person of the Month: April 2014
- Breffni Blue Cavan GAA Football Team of the Year: 2011, 2016, 2019
- Independent.ie Rising Star Awards (2): 2015, 2016
- Joe.ie GAA Football Team of the Year: 2016
- Irish News Ulster GAA Football All-Star (1): 2016
- Pundit Arena GAA Football Team of the Year: 2019
- Club Breifne Award Cavan Senior Player of the Year: 2019
