= Killian Brady =

Cavan Gaelic footballer

Personal information
- Native name: Cillian Ó Brádaigh (Irish)
- Nickname: Gunner
- Born: 11 June 1991 (age 35)
- Occupation: Garda Síochána
- Height: 6 ft 1 in (185 cm)

Sport
- Sport: Gaelic football
- Position: Corner Back/Midfield
Club
- Years: Club
- Mullahoran
Club titles
- Cavan titles: 1
Inter-county
- Years: County
- 2013–: Cavan
Inter-county titles
- Ulster titles: 1

Killian 'Gunner' Brady (born 11 June 1991) is an Irish Gaelic footballer who plays for the Cavan county team. He plays his club football with Mullahoran.

== Playing career ==
=== Club ===
On 30 September 2012, Brady started at full back against Kingscourt Stars in his first county final, and the game ended in a draw. Brady kept his position for the replay which took place on 7 October 2012. A 1–8 to 0–7 win gave Brady his first county title.

Brady was captain as Mullahoran reached another county final in 2018, but this time it was at the Intermediate grade. Mullahoran faced Cuchulainns in the final which took place on 14 October. Brady lined out at midfield as Mullahoran ran out emphatic winners. Mullahoran progressed in the Ulster Club championship with wins over Bredagh and Banagher. On 3 December, Mullahoran faced Antrim champions Naomh Éanna in the Ulster Intermediate final. The Antrim side were winners by four points.

=== Inter-county ===
==== Minor and under-21 ====
On 11 April 2012, Brady started in the Ulster under-21 final against Tyrone. An early goal helped Cavan to a 1–10 to 0–10 win. On 21 April, Brady started in the All-Ireland semi-final against Roscommon, where Cavan lost by five points.

==== Senior ====
Brady joined the Cavan senior panel in 2013. On 19 May 2013, Brady made his championship debut in an Ulster preliminary round win over Armagh.

On 27 April 2014, Brady was at midfield as Cavan faced Roscommon in the National League Division 3 Final. Roscommon were winners on a 1–17 to 0–18 scoreline.

Brady was in the half-back line as Cavan played Galway in the National League on 3 April 2016, as Cavan earned promotion to the top flight for the first time in 15 years. On 24 April, Brady started the Division 2 Final against Tyrone, with Tyrone going home with the silverware.

On 22 November 2020, Brady started in midfield against Donegal in the Ulster final. Brady received a first half black card, but didn't stop Cavan coming out winners by four points. Brady also started the All-Ireland semi-final as Cavan suffered a heavy loss to eventual champions Dublin.

Cavan faced Tipperary in the National League Division 4 final on 2 April 2022. Brady started the game as Cavan were winners on a 2–10 to 0–15 scoreline.

On 9 July 2022, Brady was at corner back as Cavan took on Westmeath in the inaugural Tailteann Cup decider at Croke Park. Westmeath came out on top with a four-point win.

Brady was also part of the panel during the 2023 National League Division 3 campaign, which finished with Cavan beating Fermanagh in the final on a 0-16 to 1-07 scoreline, although Brady missed the final game due to injury.

== Honours ==
Cavan

- Ulster Senior Football Championship (1): 2020
- National Football League Division 3 (1): 2023
- National Football League Division 4 (1): 2022
- Ulster Under-21 Football Championship (1): 2012

Mullahoran

- Cavan Senior Football Championship (1): 2012
- Cavan Intermediate Football Championship (1): 2018 (c)
- Cavan Senior Football League Division 1 (1): 2012
