= Cavan county football team =

Gaelic football team

Cavan
- Sport: Football
- Irish: An Cabhán
- Nickname(s): The Breffni men The Breffni Blues
- County board: Cavan GAA
- Manager: Dermot McCabe
- Captain: Padraig Faulkner; Ciarán Brady
- Home venue(s): Breffni Park, Cavan

Recent competitive record
- Current All-Ireland status: Ulster (QF) in 2026
- Last championship title: 1952
- Current NFL Division: 2 (6th in 2026)
- Last league title: 1947–48
First colours	Second colours

The Cavan county football team represents County Cavan in men's Gaelic football and is governed by Cavan GAA, the county board of the Gaelic Athletic Association. The team competes in the three major annual inter-county competitions; the All-Ireland Senior Football Championship, the Ulster Senior Football Championship and the National Football League.

Cavan's home ground is Breffni Park, Cavan. Raymond Galligan served as Cavan manager from September 2023 until July 2025, when he stepped down after two seasons in charge.

The team last won the Ulster Senior Championship in 2020, the All-Ireland Senior Championship in 1952 and the National League in 1948.

== History ==
=== Early years ===
Cavan is the most successful football county in the province of Ulster, having won the All-Ireland Senior Football Championship (SFC) five times, the Ulster Senior Football Championship (SFC) 40 times, and the National Football League once.

Between 1893 and 1899, neither Connacht nor Ulster took part in the All-Ireland SFC. Cavan, however, played in the preliminary round of the Leinster Senior Football Championship in 1895, losing to Louth.

=== 1933–1952: All-Ireland SFC finals ===
In the 1933 All-Ireland SFC semi-final in Breffni Park, Cavan beat Kerry with a last minute goal from Vincent McGovern, ending their five-in-a-row bid. Cavan later defeated Galway by one point in the final to become the first Ulster county to win the Sam Maguire Cup.

Two years later, Cavan defeated Kildare in the 1935 All-Ireland SFC final to win a second title in three years.

Cavan reached 1947 All-Ireland Senior Football Championship Final after defeating Roscommon in the semi-final. The concluding game was played at the Polo Grounds in New York City, the only time the final was held outside of Ireland. Kerry scored two early goals, but Cavan settled and goals from Joe Stafford and Mick Higgins meant they led by a point at half-time. Peter Donohoe kicked eight points over the hour to seal a famous victory for Cavan on a scoreline of 2–11 to 2–7, to bring Sam Maguire to Cavan for a third time.

Cavan followed this up with a one-point win over Mayo in 1948, to win back-to-back titles. The county reached its third successive final in 1949, but was denied a three-in-a-row by Meath, losing by four points.

Cavan responded to that defeat by overcoming Meath after a replay in 1952 to win the county's fifth, and most recent, All-Ireland SFC title. It remains Cavan's latest appearance in an All-Ireland SFC final.

=== 1970–present ===
Donegal All-Ireland SFC winner Martin McHugh was appointed as senior manager ahead of the 1995 season. At this time, Cavan had not won a game in the Ulster SFC for the previous seven years. Cavan won the 1997 Ulster SFC final, after beating Derry by a point. Stephen King was captain. Cavan substitute Jason O'Reilly scored the game's only goal. Martin McHugh was manager; he later described the aftermath as follows: "It was crazy, like something you would see out in Argentina. I was worried that someone was going to get killed under the bus, they'd gone mad". Cavan supporters thronged Hill 16 for the All-Ireland SFC semi-final against Kerry, King acknowledging that — despite the early goal from Fintan Cahill — Kerry "deserved their win". After the semi-final, McHugh stepped down as manager having served three years. He cited putting his family first as the reason for leaving.

With Val Andrews as manager, Cavan once again reached the Ulster SFC final again in 2001. A goal from Jason O'Reilly had Cavan leading at half time, but a strong finish from Tyrone meant they ran out winners on a 1-13 to 1-11 scoreline.

Cavan's most notable achievement in the early part of the 21st-century was ending Seán Boylan's long spell as manager of Meath in 2005. Less than a year after this success, Waterford defeated Cavan in the league to halt its push for promotion. Cian Mackey was among several players who were "rested" for the game and not included among the substitutes. The Waterford win was inspired by a line in the Cavan matchday programme that Cavan's defeat would be akin to the "sinking of the Titanic", with Waterford manager John Kiely using this to stir the away team into action.

Mackey later said: "One game turned the whole thing on its head for years. We didn't really recover from that for years, from pushing so close to promotion".

Manager Donal Keogan got the county promoted the following year but league restructuring landed Cavan in Division 2 instead. Relegation to Division 3 quickly followed. Cavan lost to Antrim in the 2009 Ulster SFC.

The county narrowly avoided relegation to Division 4 in 2012 following a loss by a scoreline of 4–6 to 0–12 to Antrim, surviving because already-relegated Tipperary defeated Offaly when an Offaly win would have sent Cavan down on the head-to-head result.

Under the management of Mattie McGleenan, Cavan's defence was not strong.

Former senior player Mickey Graham was appointed as manager ahead of the 2019 season. Fellow Cavanman Dermot McCabe and Monaghan's Martin Corey joined him. Cavan reached the 2019 Ulster SFC final in Graham's first season as manager, losing to Donegal. In 2020, Graham led Cavan to consecutive Ulster SFC finals for the first time since the 1960s. Cavan won and, because of the impact of the COVID-19 pandemic on Gaelic games, went straight into the All-Ireland SFC semi-final, the county's first appearance at that stage since 1997.

Westmeath beat Cavan to win the 2022 Tailteann Cup final.

The Cavan–Westmeath rivalry was renewed in the 2026 championship. Cavan's beating by Westmeath that year was historic as it meant Westmeath had won five championship games in the same year for the first time ever. Westmeath's victory was all the sweeter as Dermot McCabe was managing Cavan in that game, after having given Westmeath a go for less than ten months, relegating Westmeath to Division 3 before he left, so it was up to his successor Mark McHugh to secure Sam Maguire Cup football for Westmeath in 2026.

== Rivalries ==
Cavan's biggest rivalry has been with nearby Monaghan. Cavan also shares rivalries with teams from the neighbouring counties of Fermanagh, Meath and Longford. At All-Ireland level Cavan had a rivalry with Kerry. The county stopped Kerry's bid for a five-in-a-row in 1933 and also defeated Kerry in the 1947 All-Ireland Senior Football Championship Final at the Polo Grounds in New York City.

== Panel ==
Team as per Cavan vs Monaghan in the Ulster SFC preliminary round, 7 April 2024

No.	Player	Position	Club
1	Gary O'Rourke	Goalkeeper	Ballyhaise
2	Cian Reilly	Right corner back	Killygarry
3	Killian Brady	Full back	Mullahoran
4	Brían O'Connell	Left corner back	Ramor United
5	Padraig Faulkner (jc)	Right half back	Kingscourt Stars
6	Niall Carolan	Centre back	Cuchulainns
7	Conor Brady	Left half back	Gowna
8	James Smith	Midfield	Crosserlough
9	Oisín Kiernan	Midfield	Denn
10	Ciarán Brady (jc)	Right half forward	Arva
11	Gerard Smith	Centre forward	Lavey
12	Oisín Kiernan	Left half forward	Castlerahan
13	Cian Madden	Right corner forward	Gowna
14	Paddy Lynch	Full forward	Crosserlough
15	Oisin Brady	Left corner forward	Killygarry

No.	Player	Position	Club
16	Fergal O'Rourke	Substitute	Laragh United
17	Mark Magee	Substitute	Ramor United
18	Luke Fortune	Substitute	Cavan Gaels
19	Conor Rehill	Substitute	Crosserlough
20	Paddy Meade	Substitute	Kingscourt Stars
21	Tristan Noack Hofmann	Substitute	Arva
22	Ryan Donohoe	Substitute	Gowna
23	James Galligan	Substitute	Lacken
24	Tiarnan Madden	Substitute	Gowna
25	Cormac O'Reilly	Substitute	Mullahoran
26	Caoimhin O'Reilly	Substitute	Butlersbridge

== Management team ==
As of 2024 season.

- Manager: Raymond Galligan
- Assistant manager: Eamonn Murray
- Head coach and selector: James Burke
- Forwards coach and selector: Stephen O'Neill
- Selector: Damien Keaney
- Goalkeeping coach: Gary Rogers
- Head of performance: Andre Quinn
- Player liaison officer: Ronan Flanagan
- Workshops: Paul Kilgannon
- Life coach: Catherina McKiernan

== Managerial history ==
Cavan often appoint outside managers, including Liam Austin, from Down; Val Andrews and Tommy Carr, both from Dublin; Mattie Kerrigan, from Meath; Eamonn Coleman, from Derry; Eugene McGee, from Longford; and Martin McElkennon, from Tyrone. But Martin McHugh was the most successful appointment, the former Donegal footballer led Cavan to the 1997 Ulster SFC (a first in 28 years).

== Players ==
=== Dynasties ===
Willie Carolan, from the Virginia club, played for the Cavan team that won the 1905 Ulster SFC. Paddy and Edwin Carolan were part of the 1952 All-Ireland SFC-winning team, which defeated Meath after a replay which was brought about by a controversial Edwin Carolan point. Pady Carolan became the last surviving member of the 1952 team, and thus the last surviving All-Ireland SFC winner from Cavan, when Brian O'Reilly died in November 2021. Piddy Carolan's son Ronan played for Cavan between 1986 and 1999, winning an Ulster SFC in 1997, thus giving three generations of the Carolan family Ulster SFC medals. Niall Carolan, grandson of Paddy and nephew of Ronan, was part of Cavan's 2022 Tailteann Cup Final squad. Niall Carolan started that game.

=== Records ===
- Ronan Carolan is the team's top scorer in National Football League history, finishing his career with 19–387 (444) in that competition and behind only Mickey Kearins at his retirement (though since surpassed by David Tubridy who became the competition's top scorer in May 2021).

=== All-Ireland SFC winning captains ===
- 1933: Jim Smith
- 1935: Hughie O'Reilly
- 1947: John Joe O'Reilly
- 1948: John Joe O'Reilly
- 1952: Mick Higgins

=== Awards ===
All Stars

- 1978: Ollie Brady
- 1997: Dermot McCabe
- 2020: Raymond Galligan, Padraig Faulkner, Thomas Galligan

Cú Chulainn Awards

- 1963: Gabriel Kelly
- 1964: Gabriel Kelly, Charlie Gallagher
- 1966: Ray Carolan
- 1967: Gabriel Kelly, Ray Carolan

Irish News Ulster All Stars

- 1995: Peter Reilly, Ronan Carolan
- 1997: Paul O'Dowd, Ciaran Brady, Patrick Shiels, Dermot McCabe, Peter Reilly, Ronan Carolan
- 2001: Anthony Forde
- 2013: Killian Clarke, Cian Mackey, Eugene Keating, Martin Dunne
- 2016: Raymond Galligan, Conor Moynagh
- 2020: Raymond Galligan, Jason McLoughlin, Padraig Faulkner, Luke Fortune, Gerard Smith, Ciarán Brady, Killian Clarke, Thomas Galligan, Martin Reilly, Gearóid McKiernan, Oisín Kiernan, Conor Madden

All-Time All Star Award

- Mick Higgins

Team of the Century and Team of the Millennium

- John Joe O'Reilly — Centre-back

Charlie Gallagher was also named on the Team of the Century of players without an All-Ireland medal.

== Colours and crest ==
=== Kit evolution ===
2014–16	2019–20	2021–22	2023–

=== Team sponsorship ===
The following is a list of sponsors of the Cavan county football team (seniors):

- 1992: Holybrook Construction
- 1993: Atlanta Conservatories
- 1994: Cavan Co-op Mart
- 1995–present: Kingspan Group

Cavan has had only four sponsorship deals since the GAA first permitted sponsors on jerseys in 1991. There was no sponsorship on GAA jerseys until the second game of the Meath v Dublin four-in-a-row in 1991 so only a handful of teams had sponsorship in 1991. In 1992, Holybrook Construction sponsored Cavan's jerseys, although it was only for one game. For the 1993–94 seasons, Cavan Co-op Mart took over sponsorship. Kingspan has continuously sponsored Cavan since 1995.

== Honours ==
Official honours, with additions noted.

Cavan has won the All-Ireland SFC final on five occasions — all five victories came between 1933 and 1952.

Meanwhile, the county has won the Ulster SFC on 40 occasions. All bar the 39th and 40th of these came in the 1960s or earlier. The most recent one came in 2020 after a gap of 23 years. The previous one came in 1997 when Cavan defeated Derry by a scoreline of 1–14 to 0–16. That was the county's first Ulster SFC title in 28 years.

Cavan has won the National Football League once, in 1947–48.

=== National ===
- All-Ireland Senior Football Championship
  - (gold) Winners (5): 1933, 1935, 1947, 1948, 1952
  - (silver) Runners-up (6): 1925, 1928, 1937, 1943, 1945, 1949
- Tailteann Cup
  - (silver) Runners-up (1): 2022
- National Football League
  - (gold) Winners (1): 1947–48
  - (silver) Runners-up (6): 1930–31, 1932–33, 1949–50, 1952–53, 1959–60, 2002
- All-Ireland Junior Football Championship
  - (gold) Winners (2): 1927, 2014
  - (silver) Runners-up (1): 1941
- All-Ireland Under-21 Football Championship
  - (silver) Runners-up (3): 1988, 1996, 2011
- All-Ireland Minor Football Championship
  - (gold) Winners (2): 1937, 1938
  - (silver) Runners-up (2): 1952, 1959

=== Provincial ===
- Ulster Senior Football Championship
  - (gold) Winners (40): 1891, 1903, 1904, 1905, 1915, 1918, 1919, 1920, 1922, 1923, 1924, 1925, 1926, 1928, 1931, 1932, 1933, 1934, 1935, 1936, 1937, 1939, 1940, 1941, 1942, 1943, 1944, 1945, 1947, 1948, 1949, 1952, 1954, 1955, 1962, 1964, 1967, 1969, 1997, 2020
  - (silver) Runners-up (23): 1888, 1908, 1909, 1910, 1911, 1916, 1922, 1929, 1930, 1946, 1950, 1951, 1953, 1959, 1960, 1965, 1968, 1976, 1978, 1983, 1995, 2001, 2019
- Dr McKenna Cup
  - (gold) Winners (11): 1936, 1940, 1943, 1951, 1953, 1955, 1956, 1962, 1968, 1988, 2000
- Ulster Junior Football Championship
  - (gold) Winners (14): 1914, 1915, 1916, 1924, 1927, 1932, 1936, 1938, 1940, 1941, 1944, 1957, 1962, 1984
- Leinster Junior Football Championship
  - (gold) Winners (2): 2012, 2014
- Ulster Under-21 Football Championship
  - (gold) Winners (6): 1988, 1996, 2011, 2012, 2013, 2014
  - (silver) Runners-up (10): 1963, 1965, 1970, 1977, 1978, 1995, 2002, 2005, 2010, 2022
- Ulster Minor Football Championship
  - (gold) Winners (6): 1937, 1938, 1952, 1959, 1974, 2011
  - (silver) Runners-up (14): 1939, 1941, 1951, 1955, 1958, 1964, 1965, 1972, 1975, 1976, 1985, 1988, 2015, 2017
