= Kevin Maguire (Gaelic footballer) =

Westmeath Gaelic footballer

Sport
- Sport: Gaelic football
- Position: Full-back
Club
- Years: Club
- Caulry
Inter-county
- Years: County
- until 2024: Westmeath

Kevin Maguire is a Gaelic footballer who plays for Caulry and the Westmeath county team.

== Playing career ==
Maguire's role for Westmeath was often to mark the game's leading forwards.

He played as a defender in the Leinster Senior Football Championship finals of 2015 and 2016.

He was a playing member of the team when Westmeath won the 2019 National Football League Division 3 league title by a goal against Laois at Croke Park.

He took over from Kieran Martin as the Westmeath captain in 2021, the first ever Caulry player to be given the role.

He was captain when Westmeath won the 2022 Tailteann Cup. He had received a straight red card in his first Tailteann Cup game against Laois.

He spent 14 years playing for Westmeath before retiring in 2024.

He won two Westmeath Intermediate Football Championships in 2014 and in 2019.

== Personal life ==
His father is Jim Maguire. His mother is Julie. His brother John has also played for Caulry.

== Honours ==
Westmeath

- Tailteann Cup (1): 2022
- National Football League Division 3 (1): 2019

Individual

- Tailteann Cup Team of the Year (1): 2022

Sporting positions
Preceded by Kieran Martin	Westmeath Senior Football Captain; 2021–2024	Succeeded by Ronan Wallace
Achievements
Preceded by Inaugural competition	Tailteann Cup winning captain 2022	Succeeded by Donal Keogan
