= 2019 National Football League (Ireland) =

Gaelic football competition

League details
- Dates: 26 January – 6 April 2019
- Teams: 32

League champions
- Winners: Mayo (12th win)
- Captain: Diarmuid O'Connor
- Manager: James Horan

League runners-up
- Runners-up: Kerry
- Captain: Paul Murphy
- Manager: Peter Keane

Other division winners
- Division 2: Donegal
- Division 3: Westmeath
- Division 4: Derry

The 2019 National Football League, known for sponsorship reasons as the Allianz National Football League, was the 88th staging of the National Football League (NFL), an annual Gaelic football tournament for Gaelic Athletic Association county teams. Thirty-one county teams from the island of Ireland, plus London, competed; Kilkenny do not participate.

The GAA announced a new broadcast agreement on 10 January 2019, expected to run from 2019 until 2022. Eir Sport and RTÉ provided live TV coverage of the league on Saturday nights. TG4 broadcast Sunday afternoon games. The highlights programmes were RTÉ2's League Sunday on Sunday evenings, TG4's GAA 2019 on Monday evenings and Eir Sport's Allianz Leagues Reloaded on Wednesday evenings.

Mayo were the winners, defeating Kerry in the final.

== Experimental rules ==
On 24 November 2018, the GAA Central Council approved five experimental changes to the football playing rules which were amended slightly and trialled in the 2018–19 early season competitions organised by the four provincial councils (FBD League - Connacht, O'Byrne Cup - Leinster, McGrath Cup - Munster and McKenna Cup - Ulster).

The rules trialled were –

1. The maximum number of consecutive handpasses allowed is three.
2. A sideline free must be kicked forward except when it is inside the opposing team's 20 metre line.
3. An advanced mark (sometimes also referred to as an attacking mark, inside mark or offensive mark) may be taken where the ball is kicked in the area outside the opposing team's 45 metre line, travels more than 20 metres, and is caught cleanly without touching the ground in the area inside the opposing team's 45 metre line by an attacker or a defender. Up to fifteen seconds are allowed for the free resulting from the mark to be taken.
4. Ten minutes in a sin bin without replacement is imposed on a player who commits a black card offence. The offending player can re-enter the game or be substituted after the ten minutes have elapsed.
5. Kickouts must be taken from the 20 metre line but are not required to travel beyond the 45 metre line.

The effectiveness of the new rules was reviewed by Central Council on 19 January 2019. Although one of the key aims of the experiment was to reduce the number of handpasses in Gaelic football, they voted 25-23 to not continue with the rule that restricted the number of consecutive handpasses to three (which was previously trialled in the 1989 National Football League and quickly abandoned). This decision followed an almost universal campaign by GAA county team managers in the media against its permanent introduction The Gaelic Players Association (GPA) were also strongly against the three handpass rule.

Experimental rules 2 to 5 (see above) were trialled in the 2019 National Football League, beginning on 26 January 2019 and ending on 31 March 2019. There was little criticism of the four rules in the league games though Jim Gavin, the Dublin manager, said the decision to experiment in the league, the GAA's second tier inter-county competition, was "disrespectful".

GAA rules only allow changes to the playing rules in years divisible by five which means that, at the earliest, the experimental playing rules could only be approved by Congress 2020 for implementation in the 2020 Championship.

A Special Congress was held on 19 October 2019. Three rules were passed and were introduced beginning in 2020 –

- The Advanced Mark (passed by 68.9%)
- The Sin Bin (passed by 73.8%)
- Kick-outs from the centre of the 20m line (passed by 83.1%)

== Competition format ==
=== League structure ===
The 2019 National Football League consists of four divisions of eight teams. Each team plays every other team in its division once, usually four home and three away or three home and four away. Two points are awarded for a win and one point for a draw.

Teams by Province and Division
Province	Division 1	Division 2	Division 3	Division 4	Total
Connacht	3	0	1	1	5
Leinster	1	2	6	2	11
Munster	1	3	0	2	6
Ulster	3	3	1	2	9
Britain	0	0	0	1	1
Total	8	8	8	8	32

=== Tie-breaker ===
If only two teams are level on league points -

- The team that won the head-to-head match is ranked first
- If this game was a draw, score difference (total scored minus total conceded in all games) is used to rank the teams
- If score difference is identical, total scored is used to rank the teams
- If still identical, a play-off is required

If three or more teams are level on league points, score difference is used to rank the teams.

=== Finals, promotions and relegations ===
==== Division 1 ====
The top two teams in Division 1 contest the National Football League final. The bottom two teams are relegated to Division 2.

==== Division 2, Division 3 & Division 4 ====
The top two teams in Divisions 2, 3 and 4 are promoted and contest the finals of their respective divisions. The bottom two teams in Divisions 2 and 3 are relegated.

== Division 1 ==
=== Division 1 table ===
Pos	Team	Pld	W	D	L	PF	PA	PD	Pts	Qualification
1	Kerry	7	6	0	1	113	92	+21	12	Advance to Division 1 Final
2	Mayo	7	5	0	2	102	92	+10	10	Advance to Division 1 Final
3	Tyrone	7	4	1	2	108	95	+13	9	
4	Dublin	7	4	0	3	122	99	+23	8	
5	Galway	7	4	0	3	95	103	−8	8	
6	Monaghan	7	2	0	5	103	114	−11	4	
7	Roscommon	7	1	1	5	92	121	−29	3	Relegation to 2020 NFL Division 2
8	Cavan	7	1	0	6	90	109	−19	2	Relegation to 2020 NFL Division 2

Updated to match(es) played on 1 April 2019. Source: GAA.ie
Rules for classification: 1) League points; 2) Where two teams only are involved – the outcome of the meeting of the two teams in the League; 3) Score difference – subtracting the total scores against from the scores for; 4) Highest total score for; 5) Highest total goals for; 6) A play-off.

=== Division 1 Rounds 1 to 7 ===
==== Division 1 Round 1 ====
26 January 2019 Round 1	Mayo	1-08 (11) – (10) 1-07	Roscommon	Castlebar
19:00 GMT (UTC+0)				Venue: MacHale Park
		Report		Referee: Barry Cassidy (Derry); Attendance: 10,941; TV: eir Sport

27 January 2019 Round 1	Kerry	0-11 (11) – (07) 0-07	Tyrone	Killarney
14:00 GMT (UTC+0)				Venue: Fitzgerald Stadium
		Report		Referee: David Gough (Meath); Attendance: 12,921

27 January 2019 Round 1	Monaghan	2-13 (19) – (16) 1-13	Dublin	Clones
14:00 GMT (UTC+0)		(HT: 0-08 – 1-07)		Venue: St Tiernach's Park
	Gls: Stephen O'Hanlon, Shane Carey; Pts: Jack McCarron (5, 4f), Conor McManus (4, 4f), Micheál Bannigan (2f), Fintan Kelly, Dermot Malone	Report	Gls: Niall Scully; Pts: Con O'Callaghan (4, 1f), Dean Rock (4, 2f), Ryan Basquel (2), Brian Fenton, Paul Flynn, Cormac Costello (f)	Referee: David Coldrick (Meath); Attendance: 10,500; TV: TG4

27 January 2019 Round 1	Galway	0-13 (13) – (11) 0-11	Cavan	Salthill
14:30 GMT (UTC+0)				Venue: Pearse Stadium
		Report		Referee: Derek O'Mahoney (Tipperary); Attendance: 8,500

==== Division 1 Round 2 ====
2 February 2019 Round 2	Dublin	1-15 (18) – (07) 0-07	Galway	Dublin
19:00 GMT (UTC+0)				Venue: Croke Park
				Referee: Ciaran Branagan (Down); Attendance: 14,502; TV: eir Sport 1

3 February 2019 Round 2	Cavan	0-13 (13) – (16) 0-16	Kerry	Cavan
14:00 GMT (UTC+0)				Venue: Breffni Park
				Referee: Fergal Kelly (Longford)

3 February 2019 Round 2	Roscommon	1-12 (15) – (13) 0-13	Monaghan	Roscommon
14:30 GMT (UTC+0)				Venue: Dr Hyde Park
				Referee: Sean Hurson (Tyrone)

3 February 2019 Round 2	Tyrone	0-10 (10) – (19) 2-13	Mayo	Omagh
14:30 GMT (UTC+0)				Venue: Healy Park
				Referee: Joe McQuillan (Cavan); TV: TG4 (deferred)

==== Division 1 Round 3 ====
9 February 2019 Round 3	Kerry	1-18 (21) – (20) 2-14	Dublin	Tralee
19:00 GMT (UTC+0)				Venue: Austin Stack Park
		Report		Attendance: 11,982

9 February 2019 Round 3	Mayo	1-13 (16) – (11) 0-11	Cavan	Castlebar
19:00 GMT (UTC+0)				Venue: MacHale Park
				Attendance: 9,749

10 February 2019 Round 3	Monaghan	0-11 (11) – (12) 1-09	Galway	Inniskeen
14:00 GMT (UTC+0)				Venue: Páirc Grattan

10 February 2019 Round 3	Roscommon	1-10 (13) – (13) 1-10	Tyrone	Roscommon
14:00 GMT (UTC+0)				Venue: Dr Hyde Park
				Attendance: 6,000

==== Division 1 Round 4 ====
23 February 2019 Round 4	Dublin	1-12 (15) – (07) 0-07	Mayo	Dublin
19:00 GMT (UTC+0)				Venue: Croke Park
		Report		Attendance: 35,213

23 February 2019 Round 4	Tyrone	1-16 (19) – (12) 0-12	Monaghan	Omagh
19:00 GMT (UTC+0)				Venue: Healy Park
				Attendance: 5,800

24 February 2019 Round 4	Galway	1-10 (13) – (14) 0-14	Kerry	Tuam
14:00 GMT (UTC+0)				Venue: Tuam Stadium
				Attendance: 6,000

24 February 2019 Round 4	Cavan	3-13 (22) – (13) 0-13	Roscommon	Cavan
14:30 GMT (UTC+0)				Venue: Breffni Park
				Attendance: 6,390

==== Division 1 Round 5 ====
2 March 2019 Round 5	Tyrone	1-15 (18) – (09) 0-09	Cavan	Omagh
19:00 GMT (UTC+0)				Venue: Healy Park

2 March 2019 Round 5	Mayo	0-12 (12) – (14) 1-11	Galway	Castlebar
19:15 GMT (UTC+0)				Venue: MacHale Park
				Attendance: 10,675

3 March 2019 Round 5	Roscommon	1-12 (15) – (20) 2-14	Dublin	Roscommon
14:00 GMT (UTC+0)				Venue: Dr Hyde Park
				Attendance: 6,500

3 March 2019 Round 5	Kerry	0-17 (17) – (13) 0-13	Monaghan	Killarney
15:00 GMT (UTC+0)				Venue: Fitzgerald Stadium
				Attendance: 6,500

==== Division 1 Round 6 ====
16 March 2019 Round 6	Galway	1-16 (19) – (13) 1-10	Roscommon	Salthill
14:00 GMT (UTC+0)				Venue: Pearse Stadium
				Attendance: 7,643

16 March 2019 Round 6	Monaghan	0-14 (14) – (11) 1-08	Cavan	Clones
14:00 GMT (UTC+0)				Venue: St Tiernach's Park

16 March 2019 Round 6	Dublin	1-11 (14) – (17) 1-14	Tyrone	Dublin
19:00 GMT (UTC+0)				Venue: Croke Park
				Attendance: 20,000

16 March 2019 Round 6	Kerry	0-11 (11) – (13) 1-10	Mayo	Tralee
19:00 GMT (UTC+0)				Venue: Austin Stack Park
		Report

==== Division 1 Round 7 ====
24 March 2019 Round 7	Cavan	1-10 (13) – (19) 1-16	Dublin	Cavan
14:00 GMT (UTC+0)				Venue: Breffni Park
				Attendance: 7,311

24 March 2019 Round 7	Mayo	3-15 (24) – (21) 1-18	Monaghan	Castlebar
14:00 GMT (UTC+0)				Venue: MacHale Park
				Attendance: 13,287

24 March 2019 Round 7	Roscommon	0-13 (13) – (23) 2-17	Kerry	Roscommon
14:00 GMT (UTC+0)				Venue: Dr Hyde Park
				Attendance: 4,000

24 March 2019 Round 7	Tyrone	3-15 (24) – (17) 1-14	Galway	Omagh
14:00 GMT (UTC+0)				Venue: Healy Park
				Attendance: 5,115

=== Division 1 Final ===
TG4

31 March 2019
16:00 IST (UTC+1)
Final

Report

Kerry	2-10 (16) – (20) 3-11	Mayo

Croke Park, Dublin
Referee: Fergal Kelly (Longford)
Attendance: 44,257

== Division 2 ==
=== Division 2 table ===
Pos	Team	Pld	W	D	L	PF	PA	PD	Pts	Qualification or relegation
1	Meath	7	6	0	1	111	84	+27	12	Advance to Division 2 Final
2	Donegal	7	5	0	2	112	94	+18	10	Advance to Division 2 Final
3	Fermanagh	7	3	2	2	69	74	−5	8	
4	Kildare	7	3	1	3	87	93	−6	7	
5	Armagh	7	2	2	3	101	97	+4	6	
6	Clare	7	2	1	4	107	113	−6	5	
7	Cork	7	2	1	4	91	112	−21	5	Relegation to Division 3
8	Tipperary	7	1	1	5	99	110	−11	3	Relegation to Division 3

Updated to match(es) played on 1 April 2019. Source: GAA.ie
Rules for classification: 1) League points; 2) Where two teams only are involved – the outcome of the meeting of the two teams in the League; 3) Score difference – subtracting the total scores against from the scores for; 4) Highest total score for; 5) Highest total goals for; 6) A play-off.

=== Division 2 Rounds 1 to 7 ===
==== Division 2 Round 1 ====
27 January 2019 Round 1	Clare	0-13 (13) – (16) 0-16	Donegal	Ennis
14:00 GMT (UTC+0)				Venue: Cusack Park
		Report		Referee: Padraig O'Sullivan (Kerry)

27 January 2019 Round 1	Fermanagh	0-08 (08) – (08) 1-05	Cork	Enniskillen
14:00 GMT (UTC+0)				Venue: Brewster Park
				Referee: Anthony Nolan (Wicklow)

27 January 2019 Round 1	Meath	0-15 (15) – (11) 1-08	Tipperary	Navan
14:00 GMT (UTC+0)				Venue: Pairc Tailteann
				Referee: Niall Cullen (Fermanagh)

27 January 2019 Round 1	Kildare	0-14 (14) – (14) 1-11	Armagh	Newbridge
14:00 GMT (UTC+0)				Venue: St. Conleth's Park
				Referee: Paddy Neilan (Roscommon)

==== Division 2 Round 2 ====
2 February 2019 Round 2	Donegal	1-13 (16) – (14) 0-14	Meath	Ballybofey
19:00 GMT (UTC+0)				Venue: MacCumhaill Park
		Report		Referee: Jerome Henry (Meath)

3 February 2019 Round 2	Cork	0-10 (10) – (13) 1-10	Kildare	Cork
13:00 GMT (UTC+0)				Venue: Páirc Uí Chaoimh
				Referee: Sean Lonergan (Tipperary)

3 February 2019 Round 2	Armagh	1-13 (16) – (16) 2-10	Clare	Newry
14:00 GMT (UTC+0)				Venue: Páirc Esler
				Referee: Cormac Reilly (Meath)

3 February 2019 Round 2	Tipperary	2-5 (11) – (11) 2-5	Fermanagh	Thurles
14:00 GMT (UTC+0)				Venue: Semple Stadium
				Referee: Rory Hickey (Clare)

==== Division 2 Round 3 ====
9 February 2019 Round 3	Fermanagh	0-08 (8) – (6) 0-06	Kildare	Enniskillen
19:00 GMT (UTC+0)		(HT: 0-05 - 0-03)		Venue: Brewster Park
	Pts: S Quigley 3 (3fs), R Lyons 2, C Jones 1, E Donnelly 1 (1f), R Jones 1	Report	Pts: N Flynn 2 (2fs), F Conway 2 (1mark), A Tyrell 2 (2fs)	Referee: Martin McNally (Monaghan)

10 February 2019 Round 3	Clare	3-13 (22) – (13) 1-10	Cork	Ennis
14:00 GMT (UTC+0)		(HT: 2-06 - 0-06)		Venue: Cusack Park
	Gls: D Tubridy 1, C O' hAinifein 1, K Malone 1 Pts: D Tubridy 7 (4fs), C Finucane 2, Dean Ryan 1, Jamie Malone 1, Sean Collins 1, Dale Masterson 1	Report	Gls: I Maguire 1 Pts: Luke Connolly 3 (2fs), Matthew Taylor 2 (1f), and Stephen Sherlock 2 (2fs), Liam O'Donovan 1, Michael Hurley 1, Stephen Cronin 1	Referee: Paddy Neilan (Roscommon); Attendance: 1,182; TV: TG4

10 February 2019 Round 3	Meath	2-13 (19) – (13) 0-13	Armagh	Navan
14:00 GMT (UTC+0)				Venue: Pairc Tailteann
		Report

10 February 2019 Round 3	Tipperary	3-09 (18) – (13) 0-13	Donegal	Thurles
14:00 GMT (UTC+0)				Venue: Semple Stadium
		Report Report

==== Division 2 Round 4 ====
23 February 2019 Round 4	Cork	1-9 (12) – (18) 2-12	Meath	Cork
19:00 GMT (UTC+0)				Venue: Páirc Uí Chaoimh

24 February 2019 Round 4	Armagh	1-15 (18) – (12) 0-12	Tipperary	Armagh
14:00 GMT (UTC+0)				Venue: Athletic Grounds

24 February 2019 Round 4	Donegal	0-10 (10) – (13) 0-13	Fermanagh	Letterkenny
14:00 GMT (UTC+0)				Venue: O'Donnell Park
		Report

24 February 2019 Round 4	Kildare	1-16 (19) – (13) 0-13	Clare	Newbridge
14:00 GMT (UTC+0)				Venue: St Conleth's Park

==== Division 2 Round 5 ====
2 March 2019 Round 5	Tipperary	0-12 (12) – (15) 1-12	Cork	Thurles
19:00 GMT (UTC+0)				Venue: Semple Stadium

2 March 2019 Round 5	Donegal	1-09 (12) – (11) 0-11	Armagh	Ballybofey
19:15 GMT (UTC+0)				Venue: MacCumhaill Park
		Report

3 March 2019 Round 5	Meath	1-09 (12) – (11) 1-08	Kildare	Navan
14:00 GMT (UTC+0)				Venue: Pairc Tailteann

3 March 2019 Round 5	Fermanagh	0-12 (12) – (9) 0-09	Clare	Enniskillen
14:00 GMT (UTC+0)				Venue: Brewster Park

==== Division 2 Round 6 ====
17 March 2019 Round 6	Clare	1-7 (10) – (15) 1-12	Meath	Ennis
14:00 GMT (UTC+0)				Venue: Cusack Park

16 March 2019 Round 6	Cork	1-12 (15) – (22) 1-19	Donegal	Cork
14:00 GMT (UTC+0)				Venue: Pairc Uí Rinn
		Report

16 March 2019 Round 6	Kildare	1-11 (14) – (13) 2-7	Tipperary	Newbridge
14:00 GMT (UTC+0)				Venue: St. Conleth's Park

16 March 2019 Round 6	Armagh	1-9 (12) – (06) 0-06	Fermanagh	Armagh
14:00 GMT (UTC+0)				Venue: Crossmaglen

==== Division 2 Round 7 ====
24 March 2019 Round 7	Armagh	1-14 (17) – (18) 3-9	Cork	Armagh
14:00 GMT (UTC+0)				Venue: Athletic Grounds
				Referee: Maurice Deegan

24 March 2019 Round 7	Meath	2-12 (18) – (11) 0-11	Fermanagh	Navan
14:00 GMT (UTC+0)				Venue: Pairc Tailteann

24 March 2019 Round 7	Donegal	1-20 (23) – (10) 0-10	Kildare	Ballyshannon
14:00 GMT (UTC+0)				Venue: Fr Tierney Park
		Report

24 March 2019 Round 7	Tipperary	1-19 (22) – (24) 3-15	Clare	Thurles
14:00 GMT (UTC+0)				Venue: Semple Stadium

=== Division 2 Final ===
TG4

30 March 2019
17:00 IST (UTC+1)
Final

Report

Meath	1-15 (18) – (20) 1-17	Donegal

Croke Park, Dublin
Referee: Derek O'Mahoney (Tipperary)

== Division 3 ==
=== Division 3 table ===
Pos	Team	Pld	W	D	L	PF	PA	PD	Pts	Qualification or relegation
1	Westmeath	7	4	2	1	99	84	+15	10 (Note: Westmeath, Laois and Down are ranked by score difference.)	Advance to Division 3 Final
2	Laois	7	5	0	2	117	103	+14	10	Advance to Division 3 Final
3	Down	7	5	0	2	98	85	+13	10	
4	Louth	7	4	1	2	108	88	+20	9	
5	Longford	7	3	1	3	88	88	0	7	
6	Offaly	7	2	1	4	89	99	−10	5	
7	Carlow	7	2	1	4	90	94	−4	5	Relegation to Division 4
8	Sligo	7	0	0	7	92	140	−48	0	Relegation to Division 4

Updated to match(es) played on 1 April 2019. Source: GAA.ie
Rules for classification: 1) League points; 2) Where two teams only are involved – the outcome of the meeting of the two teams in the League; 3) Score difference – subtracting the total scores against from the scores for; 4) Highest total score for; 5) Highest total goals for; 6) A play-off.

=== Division 3 Rounds 1 to 7 ===
==== Division 3 Round 1 ====
26 January 2019 Round 1	Down	1-12 (15) – (21) 2-15	Laois	Newry
19:00 GMT (UTC+0)				Venue: Páirc Esler
				Referee: Martin McNally (Monaghan)

27 January 2019 Round 1	Carlow	1-11 (14) – (07) 0-07	Sligo	Carlow
14:00 GMT (UTC+0)				Venue: Dr Cullen Park
				Referee: James Molloy (Galway)

27 January 2019 Round 1	Offaly	0-12 (12) – (13) 0-13	Westmeath	Tullamore
14:00 GMT (UTC+0)				Venue: O'Connor Park
				Referee: Ciaran Branagan (Down)

27 January 2019 Round 1	Louth	0-09 (09) – (11) 1-08	Longford	Drogheda
14:30 GMT (UTC+0)				Venue: Drogheda Park
				Referee: Noel Mooney (Cavan)

==== Division 3 Round 2 ====
2 February 2019 Round 2	Westmeath	1-10 (13) – (13) 2-07	Carlow	Mullingar
15:00 GMT (UTC+0)				Venue: Cusack Park
				Referee: Liam Devenney (Mayo)

2 February 2019 Round 2	Laois	1-09 (12) – (17) 3-08	Louth	Dublin
15:00 GMT (UTC+0)				Venue: Croke Park
				Referee: Barry Tiernan (Dublin)

3 February 2019 Round 2	Sligo	1-10 (13) – (15) 1-12	Down	Collooney
14:00 GMT (UTC+0)				Venue: Connolly Park
				Referee: Padraig Hughes (Armagh)

3 February 2019 Round 2	Longford	1-06 (9) – (9) 0-09	Offaly	Longford
14:00 GMT (UTC+0)				Venue: Pearse Park
				Referee: Eamon O'Grady (Leitrim)

==== Division 3 Round 3 ====
9 February 2019 Round 3	Down	0-10 (10) – (9) 0-09	Westmeath	Newry
19:00 GMT (UTC+0)				Venue: Páirc Esler
		Report

10 February 2019 Round 3	Laois	2-18 (24) – (16) 2-10	Sligo	Portlaoise
14:00 GMT (UTC+0)

10 February 2019 Round 3	Carlow	0-09 (09) – (14) 1-11	Longford	Dr Cullen Park
14:00 GMT (UTC+0)

10 February 2019 Round 3	Offaly	2-08 (14) – (16) 2-10	Louth	Tullamore
14:00 GMT (UTC+0)				Venue: Bord Na Mona O'Connor Park

==== Division 3 Round 4 ====
24 February 2019 Round 4	Longford	0-8 (8) – (16) 3-7	Down	Longford
14:00 GMT (UTC+0)				Venue: Glennon Brothers Pearse Park

24 February 2019 Round 4	Louth	5-16 (31) – (16) 0-16	Sligo	Drogheda
14:30 GMT (UTC+0)				Venue: Drogheda Park

24 February 2019 Round 4	Westmeath	0-13 (13) – (10) 0-10	Laois	Mullingar
14:30 GMT (UTC+0)				Venue: TEG Cusack Park

24 February 2019 Round 4	Offaly	0-15 (15) – (12) 1-9	Carlow	Tullamore
15:00 GMT (UTC+0)				Venue: Bord Na Mona O'Connor Park

==== Division 3 Round 5 ====
2 March 2019 Round 5	Carlow	1-10 (13) – (12) 0-12	Louth	Dr Cullen Park
19:00 GMT (UTC+0)

2 March 2019 Round 5	Laois	0-14 (14) – (12) 0-12	Longford	Portlaoise
19:00 GMT (UTC+0)

2 March 2019 Round 5	Down	2-12 (18) – (10) 0-10	Offaly	Newry
19:00 GMT (UTC+0)				Venue: Páirc Esler

3 March 2019 Round 5	Sligo	1-10 (13) – (21) 3-12	Westmeath	Collooney
14:00 GMT (UTC+0)				Venue: Connolly Park
		Report

==== Division 3 Round 6 ====
16 March 2019 Round 6	Longford	2-15 (21) – (14) 0-14	Sligo	Longford
14:00 GMT (UTC+0)				Venue: Glennon Brothers Pearse Park

30 March 2019 Round 6	Louth	2-07 (13) – (13) 0-13	Westmeath	Drogheda
14:00 GMT		(HT: 1-04 – 0-05)		Venue: Drogheda Park

16 March 2019 Round 6	Offaly	0-15 (15) – (18) 2-12	Laois	Tullamore
14:00 GMT (UTC+0)				Venue: Bord Na Mona O'Connor Park

16 March 2019 Round 6	Carlow	1-11 (14) – (15) 0-15	Down	Dr Cullen Park
15:00 GMT (UTC+0)

==== Division 3 Round 7 ====
24 March 2019 Round 7	Sligo	1-10 (13) – (14) 1-11	Offaly	Collooney
14:00 GMT (UTC+0)				Venue: Connolly Park

24 March 2019 Round 7	Westmeath	1-14 (17) – (13) 1-10	Longford	Mullingar
14:00 GMT (UTC+0)				Venue: TEG Cusack Park

24 March 2019 Round 7	Down	1-6 (9) – (10) 0-10	Louth	Newry
14:00 GMT (UTC+0)				Venue: Páirc Esler

24 March 2019 Round 7	Laois	1-15 (18) – (15) 1-12	Carlow	Portlaoise
14:00 GMT (UTC+0)

=== Division 3 Final ===
TG4

6 April 2019
4:45 pm
Final

Report

Westmeath	1-13 (16) – (13) 0-13	Laois

Croke Park, Dublin

== Division 4 ==
=== Division 4 table ===
Pos	Team	Pld	W	D	L	PF	PA	PD	Pts	Qualification or relegation
1	Derry	7	7	0	0	129	95	+34	14	Advance to Division 4 Final
2	Leitrim	7	6	0	1	119	94	+25	12	Advance to Division 4 Final
3	Antrim	7	3	0	4	100	90	+10	6	
4	Waterford	7	3	0	4	91	97	−6	6	
5	Wexford	7	3	0	4	105	114	−9	6	
6	Wicklow	7	3	0	4	78	90	−12	6	
7	Limerick	7	2	0	5	82	91	−9	4	
8	London	7	1	0	6	71	89	−18	2	

Updated to match(es) played on 1 April 2019. Source: GAA.ie
Rules for classification: 1) League points; 2) Where two teams only are involved – the outcome of the meeting of the two teams in the League; 3) Score difference – subtracting the total scores against from the scores for; 4) Highest total score for; 5) Highest total goals for; 6) A play-off.

=== Division 4 Rounds 1 to 7 ===
==== Division 4 Round 1 ====
26 January 2019 Round 1	Waterford	0-09 (09) – (10) 1-07	Wicklow	Dungarvan
19:00 GMT (UTC+0)				Venue: Fraher Field
				Referee: James Bermingham (Cork)

27 January 2019 Round 1	Antrim	1-09 (12) – (13) 1-10	Derry	Belfast
14:00 GMT (UTC+0)				Venue: Corrigan Park
				Referee: Paul Faloon (Down)

27 January 2019 Round 1	London	0-10 (10) – (11) 0-11	Limerick	Ruislip
14:00 GMT (UTC+0)				Venue: McGovern Park
				Referee: Patrick Maguire (Longford)

27 January 2019 Round 1	Leitrim	3-15 (24) – (11) 0-11	Wexford	Carrick-on-Shannon
14:00 GMT (UTC+0)				Venue: Páirc Seán Mac Diarmada
				Referee: Brendan Cawley (Kildare)

==== Division 4 Round 2 ====
3 February 2019 Round 2	Limerick	1-13 (16) – (10) 0-10	Waterford	Newcastlewest
14:00 GMT (UTC+0)
				Referee: John Hickey (Carlow)

3 February 2019 Round 2	Wexford	1-10 (13) – (09) 0-09	Antrim	Wexford
14:00 GMT (UTC+0)				Venue: Wexford Park
				Referee: Alan Kissane (Waterford)

3 February 2019 Round 2	Wicklow	1-12 (15) – (19) 1-16	Leitrim	Aughrim
14:30 GMT (UTC+0)				Venue: Aughrim County Ground
				Referee: Niall McKenna (Monaghan)

3 February 2019 Round 2	Derry	0-19 (19) – (12) 1-09	London	Ballinascreen
12:30 (UTC)				Venue: Dean McGlinchey Park
				Referee: Sean Laverty (Antrim)

==== Division 4 Round 3 ====
10 February 2019 Round 3	Wicklow	2-08 (14) – (9) 1-06	Limerick	Aughrim
14:00 GMT (UTC+0)				Venue: Aughrim County Ground

10 February 2019 Round 3	Waterford	1-08 (11) – (18) 2-12	Derry	Dungarvan
12:30 (UTC)				Venue: Fraher Field
				Referee: Seamus Mulhare

10 February 2019 Round 3	London	2-11 (17) – (9) 1-06	Wexford	Ruislip
14:00 GMT (UTC+0)				Venue: McGovern Park

10 February 2019 Round 3	Leitrim	0-14 (14) – (13) 1-10	Antrim	Carrick-on-Shannon
14:00 GMT (UTC+0)				Venue: Páirc Seán Mac Diarmada

==== Division 4 Round 4 ====
23 February 2019 Round 4	Limerick	0-11 (11) – (12) 0-12	Leitrim	Kilmallock
14:00 GMT (UTC+0)

24 February 2019 Round 4	Antrim	1-13 (16) – (11) 1-8	London	Belfast
13:00 GMT (UTC+0)				Venue: Corrigan Park

24 February 2019 Round 4	Wexford	0-12 (12) – (19) 5-4	Waterford	Wexford
14:00 GMT (UTC+0)				Venue: Wexford Park

24 February 2019 Round 4	Derry	2-8 (14) – (9) 0-9	Wicklow	Maghera
14:00 GMT (UTC+0)				Venue: Watty Graham Park

==== Division 4 Round 5 ====
2 March 2019 Round 5	Wicklow	0-09 (9) – (12) 0-12	Wexford	Aughrim
14:00 GMT (UTC+0)				Venue: Aughrim County Ground

3 March 2019 Round 5	Waterford	1-09 (12) – (11) 1-08	Antrim	Dungarvan
12:30 GMT (UTC+0)				Venue: Fraher Field

3 March 2019 Round 5	Leitrim	1-09 (12) – (7) 0-07	London	Carrick on Shannon
13:00 GMT (UTC+0)				Venue: Páirc Seán Mac Diarmada

3 March 2019 Round 5	Limerick	1-05 (8) – (13) 0-13	Derry	Limerick
1:00 pm (UTC+0)				Venue: Gaelic Grounds
				Referee: Barry Judge

==== Division 4 Round 6 ====
16 March 2019 Round 6	Antrim	2-15 (21) – (13) 1-10	Wicklow	Glenavy
14:00 GMT (UTC+0)

16 March 2019 Round 6	London	0-7 (7) – (15) 2-9	Waterford	Ruislip
14:00 GMT (UTC+0)				Venue: McGovern Park

16 March 2019 Round 6	Wexford	0-14 (14) – (13) 1-10	Limerick	Wexford
14:00 GMT (UTC+0)				Venue: Wexford Park

16 March 2019 Round 6	Derry	2-16 (22) – (15) 1-12	Leitrim	Derry
14:00 GMT (UTC+0)				Venue: Celtic Park

==== Division 4 Round 7 ====
23 March 2019 Round 7	Derry	3-21 (30) – (28) 4-16	Wexford	Bellaghy
4:00 pm

24 March 2019 Round 7	Wicklow	0-8 (8) – (6) 0-6	London	Aughrim
13:00 GMT (UTC+0)				Venue: Aughrim County Ground

24 March 2019 Round 7	Limerick	1-11 (14) – (18) 2-12	Antrim	Newcastlewest
13:00 (UTC+0)

24 March 2019 Round 7	Leitrim	1-20 (23) – (15) 2-9	Waterford	Carrick-on-Shannon
13:00 GMT (UTC+0)				Venue: Páirc Seán Mac Diarmada

=== Division 4 Final ===
TG4

30 March 2019
3:00 pm
Final

Report

Derry	0-20 (20) – (16) 0-16	Leitrim

Croke Park, Dublin
Attendance: 30,465

== League statistics ==
- All scores correct as of 16 April 2019

=== Top scorer: Overall ===
Rank	Player	County	Tally	Total	Matches	Average
1	Ger Egan	Westmeath	3-50	59	8	7.4
2	Seán O'Shea	Kerry	1-55	58	8	7.2
3	Evan O'Carroll	Laois	1-41	44	8	5.5
4	Jonathan Bealin	Wexford	0-42	42	7	6
5	Conor McManus	Monaghan	0-41	41	7	5.9
6	Ryan O'Rourke	Leitrim	4-28	40	7	5.7
7	Dean Rock	Dublin	2-32	38	7	5.4
8	Mickey Newman	Meath	1-33	36	8	4.5
8	Conor Sweeney	Tipperary	2-30	36	7	5.1
10	David Tubridy	Clare	3-26	35	7	5
11	Donal O'Hare	Down	4-22	34	7	4.9
12	Peter Harte	Tyrone	3-24	33	7	4.7
13	Bernard Allen	Offaly	0-31	31	7	4.4
14	Ryan Murray	Antrim	3-21	30	6	5

=== Top scorer: Single game ===
Rank	Player	County	Tally	Total	Opposition
1	Ryan O'Rourke	Leitrim	2-07	13	Wexford
2	Seán O'Shea	Kerry	0-12	12	Cavan
2	Conor Sweeney	Tipperary	1-09	12	Clare
4	Shane McGuigan	Derry	2-05	11	Leitrim
4	Donal O'Hare	Down	3-02	11	Longford
6	Jonathan Bealin	Wexford	0-10	10	Derry
6	David Tubridy	Clare	1-07	10	Armagh
6	David Tubridy	Clare	1-07	10	Cork
6	Ger Egan	Westmeath	1-07	10	Laois
10	Ryan Bell	Derry	0-09	9	Wexford
10	Dean Rock	Dublin	0-09	9	Cavan
10	Ger Egan	Westmeath	0-09	9	Carlow
10	Ger Egan	Westmeath	0-09	9	Laois
10	Ger Egan	Westmeath	0-09	9	Longford
10	Ross Munnelly	Laois	1-06	9	Louth
10	Niall McNamee	Offaly	1-06	9	Sligo
10	Peter Harte	Tyrone	1-06	9	Monaghan
10	Ryan Burns	Louth	2-03	9	Laois

=== Scoring events ===
- Widest winning margin: 15
  - Louth 5-16 – 0-16 Sligo (Division 3)
- Most goals in a match: 7
  - Derry 3-21 – 4-16 Wexford (Division 4)
- Most points in a match: 37
  - Derry 3-21 – 4-16 Wexford (Division 4)
- Most goals by one team in a match: 5
  - Louth 5-16 – 0-16 Sligo (Division 3)
  - Wexford 0-12 – 5-04 Waterford (Division 4)
- Most goals without winning: 4
  - Derry 3-21 – 4-16 Wexford (Division 4)
- Highest aggregate score: 58 points
  - Derry 3-21 – 4-16 Wexford (Division 4)
- Lowest aggregate score: 14 points
  - Fermanagh 0-08 – 0-06 Kildare (Division 2)
  - Wicklow 0-08 – 0-06 London (Division 4)
