= 2022 Tailteann Cup =

Gaelic football competition

Tournament details
- Level: Tier 2
- Year: 2022
- Trophy: Tailteann Cup
- Date: 21 May – 9 July 2022
- Teams: 17

Winners
- Champions: Westmeath (1st win)
- Manager: Jack Cooney
- Captain: Kevin Maguire

Runners-up
- Runners-up: Cavan
- Manager: Mickey Graham
- Captain: Raymond Galligan

Other
- Matches played: 16
- Player of the Year: Ronan O'Toole
- Top Scorer: John Heslin (1–25)

The 2022 Tailteann Cup was the inaugural edition of the Tailteann Cup, a Gaelic football competition contested by as many as sixteen county teams from Divisions 3 and 4 of the 2022 National Football League plus New York (other teams competed for the Sam Maguire Cup). Division 3 or 4 teams initially competed in their provincial championship and if they reached their provincial final, they continued in the 2022 All-Ireland Senior Football Championship, progressing to the All-Ireland Qualifiers, whereas if they were beaten in their provincial final, they did not participate in the 2022 Tailteann Cup.

The final was played on 9 July 2022 at Croke Park in Dublin, between Cavan and Westmeath. Westmeath won after a 2–14 to 1–13 defeat of Cavan.

== Format ==
The inaugural Tailteann Cup was contested by seventeen teams: the sixteen set to play in Divisions 3 and 4 of the 2023 National Football League, plus New York. These teams could only have qualified for the Tier 1 All-Ireland Championship, the Sam Maguire Cup, if they had reached their provincial final. The Sam Maguire Cup was contested by the sixteen teams set to play in Divisions 1 and 2 of the 2023 National Football League.

Louth and Limerick qualified for the Sam Maguire Cup as a result of winning promotion from Division 3 to Division 2 for 2023, while Down and Offaly competed in the Tailteann Cup as a result of being relegated from Division 2 to Division 3 for 2023.

The 2022 Tailteann Cup was a straight knockout format, with two preliminary-round games and seven first-round games followed by quarter-finals, semi-finals and a final. New York received a bye to the quarter-finals. The seventeen teams were organised on a geographical basis, with eight assigned to a northern section and nine to a southern section (including New York). The eight northern teams were drawn against each other in four of the seven first-round games. Four of the southern teams were drawn in two preliminary-round games, with the two winners then joining the remaining four teams in three first-round games. All seven first-round winners joined New York (who were assigned to the southern section) in the quarter-finals, with pairings decided via an open draw within each geographic section. The semi-final pairings were then decided via an open draw.

From 2023, the Tailteann Cup is set to be played on a round-robin basis, with the first round consisting of four groups of four teams with no geographical structure.

=== Team allocation ===
Entry round	Counties			
Quarter-finals	New York			
First round	Antrim	Down	Leitrim	Sligo
First round	Carlow	Fermanagh	London	Tipperary
First round	Cavan	Laois	Longford	Westmeath
Preliminary round	Offaly	Waterford	Wexford	Wicklow

== Teams ==
None of the seventeen teams qualified for their provincial final. Doing so would have resulted in them competing in the Tier 1 Sam Maguire Cup instead.

Team	2022 League result	2022 Championship result	Appearance	Best result	Date of qualification
Fermanagh	5th in Division 3	Lost 2-10 – 2–17 to Tyrone (Ulster preliminary round)	1st	n/a	16 April 2022
New York	Did not compete	Lost 0-15 – 1–16 to Sligo (Connacht quarter-finals)	1st	n/a	17 April 2022
London	5th in Division 4	Lost 2-11 – 3–12 to Leitrim (Connacht quarter-finals)	1st	n/a	17 April 2022
Antrim	4th in Division 3	Lost 1-20 – 0–10 to Cavan (Ulster quarter-finals)	1st	n/a	23 April 2022
Carlow	7th in Division 4	Lost 5-10 – 0–10 to Louth (Leinster first round)	1st	n/a	24 April 2022
Laois	7th in Division 3	Lost 5-15 – 4–12 to Wicklow (Leinster first round)	1st	n/a	24 April 2022
Offaly	7th in Division 2	Lost 1-15 – 1–12 to Wexford (Leinster first round)	1st	n/a	24 April 2022
Sligo	3rd in Division 4	Lost 0-11 – 0–23 to Roscommon (Connacht semi-finals)	1st	n/a	30 April 2022
Longford	6th in Division 3	Lost 3-13 – 0–14 to Westmeath (Leinster quarter-finals)	1st	n/a	30 April 2022
Waterford	8th in Division 4	Lost 2-13 – 1–8 to Tipperary (Munster quarter-finals)	1st	n/a	30 April 2022
Wexford	6th in Division 4	Lost 1-24 – 0–4 to Dublin (Leinster quarter-finals)	1st	n/a	30 April 2022
Down	8th in Division 2	Lost 0-23 – 2–7 to Monaghan (Ulster quarter-finals)	1st	n/a	30 April 2022
Wicklow	8th in Division 3	Lost 4-13 – 1–12 to Meath (Leinster quarter-finals)	1st	n/a	1 May 2022
Leitrim	4th in Division 4	Lost 4-20 – 0–09 to Galway (Connacht semi-finals)	1st	n/a	8 May 2022
Cavan	1st in Division 4	Lost 2-16 – 0–16 to Donegal (Ulster semi-finals)	1st	n/a	8 May 2022
Tipperary	2nd in Division 4	Lost 2-10 – 0–10 to Limerick (Munster semi-finals)	1st	n/a	14 May 2022
Westmeath	3rd in Division 3	Lost 1-21 – 2–15 to Kildare (Leinster semi-finals)	1st	n/a	15 May 2022

== Bracket ==
There was an open draw for all rounds, including quarter-finals and semi-finals. It was split into N (north) and S (south) sections until semi finals. Both sections then combined. The first team pulled out received home advantage. The semi-finals and final were played in Croke Park.

Preliminary round 21/22 May
Wexford	2–13
Offaly	3–11
Wicklow	3–16
Waterford	1–10

Round 1; 28/29 May
Leitrim	2–14
Antrim	1–12
Sligo	3–15
London	2–16
Longford	0–12
Fermanagh	1–12
Cavan	0–24
Down	1–12
Offaly	0–18
Wicklow	0–10
Carlow	1–12
Tipperary	1–10
Laois	0–13
Westmeath	1–13

Quarter-finals; 4/5 June
Leitrim	2–16 (3)
Sligo	1–19 (4)
Fermanagh	0–13
Cavan	2–16
Offaly	3–17
New York	0–11
Carlow	2–13
Westmeath	1–21

Semi-finals; 19 June
Sligo	1–14
Cavan	0–20
Offaly	2–16
Westmeath	3–22

Final; 9 July
Cavan	1–13
Westmeath	2–14

== Preliminary round ==
Four teams competed in the preliminary round.

21 May 2022 Preliminary round (S)	Wicklow	3-16 – 1-10	Waterford	County Grounds, Aughrim
	Kevin Quinn 2-1 (1-0 pen), Eoin Darcy 1-3 (0-2f), Mark Jackson 0-4 (0-4f), Mark Kenny 0-4 (0-1m), Dean Healy 0-2, Pádraig O’Toole 0-1, Oisin McGraynor 0-1	Report	Jason Curry 0-4 (0-2f), Brian Looby 1-0, Darragh Corcoran 0-2 (0-2f), Brian Lynch 0-2, Dermot Ryan 0-1, Gareth Duffy 0-1 each.	Referee: David Coldrick (Meath)

22 May 2022 Preliminary Round (S)	Wexford	2-13 – 3-11	Offaly	Bellefield, Enniscorthy
	Niall Hughes 1-1, Ben Brosnan 0-3 (0-1f, 0-1m), Dylan Furlong 1-0, Kevin O'Grady 0-2, Eoghan Nolan 0-2, Donal Shanley 0-1 (0-1f), Eoin Porter 0-1, Dean O'Toole 0-1, Glen Malone 0-1	Report	Niall McNamee 1-5 (0-3f), Diarmuid Egan 1-0, Lee Pearson 1-0, Anton Sullivan 0-2, Niall Darby 0-1 (0-1f), Johnny Moloney 0-1, Bill Carroll 0-1, Keith O'Neill 0-1	Referee: Maurice Deegan (Laois)

== Round 1 ==
The two preliminary round winners were joined by the other twelve teams.

28 May 2022 Round 1 (N)	Longford	0-12 – 1-12	Fermanagh	Pearse Park, Longford
	Darren Gallagher 0-5 (0-5f), Keelin McGann 0-2, Mark Hughes 0-2, Kevin Diffley 0-1, Ryan Moffat 0-1, Fergal Sheridan 0-1.	Report	Sean Quigley 0-4 (0-4f), Ryan Jones 0-4, Ultán Kelm 1-1, Ciaran Corrigan 0-1, Darragh McGurn 0-1, Conall Jones 0-1.	Referee: Jerome Henry (Mayo)

28 May 2022 Round 1 (N)	Leitrim	2-14 – 1-12	Antrim	Páirc Seán Mac Diarmada, Carrick-on-Shannon
	Keith Beirne 0-6 (0-3f), Jack Heslin 1-2, Shane Moran 1-0, David Bruen 0-1, Pearce Dolan 0-1, Cillian McGloin 0-1, Evan Sweeney 0-1, Jordan Reynolds 0-1, Mark Plunkett 0-1.	Report	Pat Shivers 0-4, Peter Healy 1-1, Ruairí McCann 0-2 (0-2f), Dermot McAleese 0-2, Odhrán Eastwood 0-1, Patrick McBride 0-1, Jamie Gribbon 0-1.	Referee: Barry Cassidy (Derry)

28 May 2022 Round 1 (N)	Sligo	3-15 – 2-16 (a.e.t.)	London	Markievicz Park, Sligo
	Alan Reilly 1-6, Patrick O'Connor 0-4 (0-1f), Pat Hughes 1-1, Brian Egan 1-0, Aidan Devaney 0-1 (0-1 45), Sean Carrabine 0-1 (1f), Pat Spillane 0-1, Donal Conlon 0-1	Report	James Gallagher 1-3, Ferghal McMahon 0-4 (0-4f), Matthew Walsh 1-1, Sean Hickey 0-2, Liam Gavaghan 0-1 (0-1f), Christopher Farley 0-1 (0-1f), James Hynes 0-1, Conal Gallagher 0-1	Referee: Niall Cullen (Fermanagh)

28 May 2022 Round 1 (N)	Cavan	0-24 – 1-12	Down	Breffni Park, Cavan
	Raymond Galligan 0-7 (0-4f, 0-3 45), Gearóid McKiernan 0-6 (0-4f), Paddy Lynch 0-4 (0-1f), James Smith 0-2, Gerard Smith 0-2, Oisín Kiernan 0-1, Thomas Edward Donohoe 0-1, Niall Carolan 0-1	Report	Liam Kerr 0-3, Ruairi O’Hare 1-0, Andrew Gilmore 0-2 (0-1f), Barry O’Hagan 0-2 (0-1f), Anthony Doherty 0-1, Odhran Murdock 0-1, Ryan Magill 0-1, Ruairi McCormack 0-1	Attendance: 3,616; Referee: David Gough (Meath)

29 May 2022 Round 1 (S)	Offaly	0-18 – 0-10	Wicklow	O'Connor Park, Tullamore
	Niall McNamee 0-5 (0-3f, 0-1m), Ruairí McNamee 0-3, Anton Sullivan 0-2, Keith O’Neill 0-2, Jack Bryant 0-1, Jordan Hayes 0-1, Mark Abbott 0-1, Morgan Tynan 0-1, Niall Darby 0-1, Bill Carroll 0-1	Report	Eoin Darcy 0-3 (0-3f), Mark Jackson 0-3 (0-3f), Kevin Quinn 0-2 (0-2m), Mark Kenny 0-2 (0-1m)	Referee: Seán Lonergan (Tipperary)

29 May 2022 Round 1 (S)	Carlow	1-12 – 1-10	Tipperary	Dr Cullen Park, Carlow
	Niall Hickey 1-0, Jamie Clarke 0-2, Eoghan Ruth 0-2, Colm Hulton 0-2, Ross Dunphy 0-2, Darragh Foley 0-1 (0-1f), Sean Bambrick 0-1, Conor Doyle 0-1, Conor Crowley 0-1	Report	Conor Sweeney 0-3 (0-1f), Martin Kehoe 1-0, Sean O’Connor 0-2 (0-2f), Liam McGrath 0-2, Shane O'Connell 0-1, Sean O’Connell 0-1, Jack Kennedy 0-1	Referee: Cormac Reilly (Meath)

29 May 2022 Round 1 (S)	Westmeath	1-13 – 0-13	Laois	O'Moore Park, Portlaoise
	John Heslin 0-5 (0-4f), Luke Loughlin 0-4 (0-1 45), Sam McCartan 1-1, Ronan O'Toole 0-1, Jonathan Lynam 0-1, Robbie Forde 0-1	Report	Mark Barry 0-5 (0-4f), Evan O’Carroll 0-4 (0-1f), Eoin Lowry 0-2 (0-1m), James Finn 0-1 (0-f), Donie Kingston 0-1	Referee: Derek O'Mahoney (Tipperary)

== Quarter-finals ==
New York joined the seven Round 1 winners:

4 June 2022 Quarter-final (S)	Offaly	3-17 – 0-11	New York	O'Connor Park, Tullamore
	Niall McNamee 0-6 (0-5f), Keith O'Neill 1-1, Cathal Flynn 1-1, Anton Sullivan 1-0, Niall Darby 0-2 (0-1f), Ruairi McNamee 0-2, Jack Bryant 0-2, Paddy Dunican 0-1 (0-1f), Johnny Moloney 0-1, Jack McEvoy 0-1,	Report	Jack Reilly 0-4 (0-2f), Adrian Varley 0-4 (0-1m), Connell Aherne 0-2, Sean Reilly 0-1 (0-1 45)	Referee: Martin McNally (Monaghan)

5 June 2022 Quarter-final (S)	Carlow	2-13 – 1-21	Westmeath	Dr Cullen Park, Carlow
	Darragh Foley 0-5 (0-5f), Niall Hickey 1-0, Josh Moore 1-0, Ross Dunphy 0-2, Colm Hulton 0-2, Jamie Clarke 0-1 (0-1f), Mikey Bambrick 0-1, Shane Clarke 0-1, Conor Doyle 0-1	Report	John Heslin 1-9 (0-7f), Luke Loughlin 0-4 (0-1f), Sam McCartan 0-3, Ronan O'Toole 0-2, Lorcan Dolan 0-1 (0-1m), Jamie Gonoud 0-1, Sam Duncan 0-1	Referee: Conor Lane (Cork)

5 June 2022 Quarter-final (N)	Fermanagh	0-13 – 2-16	Cavan	Brewster Park, Enniskillen
	Sean Quigley 0-8 (0-8f), Darragh McGurn 0-2 (0-1f), Ryan Jones 0-2, James McMahon 0-1	Report	Thomas Galligan 1-4, Gearóid McKiernan 0-5, Paddy Lynch 0-3 (0-2f), Pádraig Faulkner 1-0, Raymond Galligan 0-1 (0-1 45), Jason McLoughlin 0-1, Conor Brady 0-1, Cormac O’Reilly 0-1	Referee: Paul Faloon (Down)

5 June 2022 Quarter-final (N)	Leitrim	2-16 – 1-19 (a.e.t.) (3–4 p)	Sligo	Páirc Seán Mac Diarmada, Carrick-on-Shannon
	Keith Beirne 1-6 (1m); Ryan O’Rourke 1-2; Evan Sweeney 0-2; Riordan O'Rourke 0-1, Jack Heslin 0-1, Dean McGovern 0-1, Jordan Reynolds 0-1, Mark Plunkett 0-1, Emlyn Mulligan 0-1 each.	Report	Alan Reilly 0-6, Patrick O’Connor 0-5 (0-1f, 0-1m), Sean Carrabine 0-5 (0-1f), Mark Walsh 1-0, Darragh Cummins 0-1, Peter Laffey 0-1, Nathan Rooney 0-1	Attendance: 4,231; Referee: Maurice Deegan (Laois)
	Penalties
	Ryan O'Rourke; Keith Beirne; Jack Heslin; Shane Quinn; Emlyn Mulligan		Nathan Rooney; Alan Reilly; Donal Conlan; Brendan Egan

== Semi-finals ==
19 June 2022 Semi-final	Sligo	1-14 – 0-20	Cavan	Croke Park, Dublin
	Patrick O'Connor 1-2 (1-0 pen, 0-1m), Niall Murphy 0-4, Sean Carrabine 0-3 (0-2f), Pat Spillane 0-2, Darragh Cummins 0-1, Alan Reilly 0-1, Pat Hughes 0-1	Report	Gearóid McKiernan 0-4 (3f), Gerard Smith 0-4, James Smith 0-2, Cian Madden 0-2, Raymond Galligan 0-1 (0-1f), Killian Brady 0-1, Killian Clarke 0-1, Conor Brady 0-1, Thomas Galligan 0-1, Oisín Kiernan 0-1, Martin Reilly 0-1, Paddy Lynch 0-1	Referee: Fergal Kely (Longford)

19 June 2022 Semi-final	Westmeath	3-22 – 2-16	Offaly	Croke Park, Dublin
	John Heslin 0-8 (0-3f), Lorcan Dolan 2-1, Ronan O'Toole 0-4, Sam McCartan 0-3, Ronan Wallace 1-0, Luke Loughlin 0-2, James Dolan 0-1, Ray Connellan 0-1, Alex Gardiner 0-1, Robbie Forde 0-1	Report	Niall McNamee 0-6 (0-6f), Keith O’Neill 1-2, Cathal Flynn 1-0, Dylan Hyland 0-3, Anton Sullivan 0-2, Jack Bryant 0-1, Jack McEvoy 0-1, Mark Abbott 0-1	Referee: Paul Faloon (Down)

== Final ==
9 July 2022 Final	Cavan	1-13 – 2-14	Westmeath	Croke Park, Dublin
15:00	Gearóid McKiernan 0-3 (0-1f), Gerard Smith 0-3, Paddy Lynch 0-3, Pádraig Faulkner 1-0, Jason McLoughlin 0-1, Oisín Kiernan 0-1, James Smith 0-1, Stephen Smith 0-1	Report	Ronan O'Toole 0-5, John Heslin 0-3 (0-2f), Sam McCartan 0-3 (0-1 45), Lorcan Dolan 1-0, Kieran Martin 1-0, Luke Loughlin 0-2, Ronan Wallace 0-1	Referee: Barry Cassidy (Derry); Man of the Match: Ronan O'Toole (Westmeath)

== Championship statistics ==
=== Top scorer: overall ===
Rank	Player	County	Tally	Total	Matches	Average
1	John Heslin	Westmeath	1–25	28	4	7.0
2	Niall McNamee	Offaly	1–22	25	4	6.25
3	Gearóid McKiernan	Cavan	0–18	18	4	4.5

=== Top scorer: single game ===
Rank	Player	County	Tally	Total	Opposition
1	John Heslin	Westmeath	1–9	12	Carlow

=== Scoring events ===
All records exclude extra-time.

- Widest winning margin: 15 points
  - Offaly 3–17 – 0–11 New York (quarter-final)
- Most goals in a match: 5
  - Wexford 2–13 – 3–11 Offaly (preliminary round)
  - Westmeath 3–22 – 2–16 Offaly (semi-final)
- Most points in a match: 38
  - Westmeath 3–22 – 2–16 Offaly (semi-final)
- Most goals by one team in a match: 3
  - Wicklow 3–16 – 1–10 Waterford (preliminary round)
  - Wexford 2–13 – 3–11 Offaly (preliminary round)
  - Offaly 3–17 – 0–11 New York (quarter-final)
  - Westmeath 3–22 – 2–16 Offaly (semi-final)
- Most points by one team in a match: 24
  - Cavan 0–24 – 1–12 Down (round 1)
- Highest aggregate score: 53 points
  - Westmeath 3–22 – 2–16 Offaly (semi-final)
- Lowest aggregate score: 27 points
  - Longford 0–12 – 1–12 Fermanagh (Round 1)

== Miscellaneous ==
- First-time championship meetings:
  - Offaly vs New York (Tailteann cup quarter-finals)
- Westmeath won their 1st championship in 19 years, last winning the 2004 Leinster Senior Football Championship.
- The meeting between Wicklow and Waterford was the first ever game in the Tailteann Cup, with the former winning by 3–16 to 1–10.
- This meeting between New York and Offaly was the first meeting of a non-Connacht team for New York since their admission to the All-Ireland Senior Football Championship in 1999.
- The meeting of Offaly and New York was New York's first Championship game in Ireland since the 2001 Connacht quarter-final where they lost 3–13 to 1–9 against Roscommon in Dr Hyde Park.

== See also ==
- 2022 All-Ireland Senior Football Championship
- Gaelic Athletic Association
