= 2019 O'Byrne Cup =

Tournament details
- Province: Leinster
- Year: 2019
- Trophy: O'Byrne Cup

Winners
- Champions: Westmeath (4th win)
- Manager: Jack Cooney

Runners-up
- Runners-up: Dublin
- Manager: Paul Clarke

Other
- Matches played: 18

The 2019 O'Byrne Cup was played by county teams of Leinster GAA in December 2018 and January 2019.

The draw took place on 26 September 2018.

Several new rules are being trialled in the competition:

- four consecutive handpasses were forbidden
- the "advanced mark" was introduced
- sideline kicks must go forward (unless inside the attacking 20-metre line)
- all kickouts are from the 20-metre line
- a "sin bin" for a black card offence.

It was won by Westmeath.

== Competition format ==
One team (Dublin) received a bye to the semi-finals. The remaining ten teams were drawn to play in one group of four teams and two groups of three teams.

In the four-team group, each team plays the other teams in their group once. Two points are awarded for a win and one for a draw.

In the two three-team groups, each team played the other teams in their group once. Each team also played one game against a team from the other three-team group. Two points are awarded for a win and one for a draw.

The three group winners advanced to the semi-finals.

== Group stage ==
=== Group 1 ===
Pos	Team	Pld	W	D	L	PF	PA	PD	Pts	Qualification
1	Westmeath	3	2	1	0	39	29	+10	5	Advance to semi-final
2	Kildare	3	2	0	1	49	36	+13	4	
3	Carlow	3	1	0	2	38	48	−10	2	
4	Offaly	3	0	1	2	42	55	−13	1	

Updated to match(es) played on 6 January 2019. Source: Leinster GAA

9 December 2018 Round 1	Carlow	0-08 (08) – (12) 0-12	Westmeath	Carlow
14:00 GMT (UTC±0)				Venue: Dr Cullen Park
		Report

15 December 2018 Round 2	Kildare	0-16 (16) – (09) 1-06	Carlow	Newbridge
14:00 GMT (UTC±0)				Venue: St Conleth's Park
		Report		Referee: G Hurley (Westmeath)

20 December 2018 Round 1	Offaly	0-11 (11) – (23) 1-20	Kildare	Kilcormac
19:45 GMT (UTC±0)				Venue: Faithful Fields
		Report

29 December 2018 Round 2	Westmeath	0-11 (11) – (11) 0-11	Offaly	Mullingar
14:00 GMT (UTC±0)				Venue: St Loman's Sports Ground
		Report

5 January 2019 Round 3	Carlow	3-12 (21) – (20) 2-14	Offaly	Carlow
14:00 GMT (UTC±0)				Venue: Dr Cullen Park

6 January 2019 Round 3	Westmeath	1-13 (16) – (10) 1-07	Kildare	Mullingar
14:00 GMT (UTC±0)				Venue: The Downs

=== Three-team groups ===
==== Group 2 ====
Pos	Team	Pld	W	D	L	PF	PA	PD	Pts	Qualification
1	Longford	3	2	1	0	38	36	+2	5	Advance to semi-final
2	Louth	3	1	1	1	48	47	+1	3	
3	Wicklow	3	0	0	3	37	47	−10	0	

Updated to match(es) played on 5 January 2019. Source: Leinster GAA

8 December 2018 Round 1	Longford	1-07 (10) – (09) 1-06	Wicklow	Newtownforbes
19:00 GMT (UTC±0)				Venue: Bertie Allen Park
		Report		Referee: Niall Ward (Westmeath)

29 December 2018 Round 2	Wicklow	1-09 (12) – (20) 1-17	Louth	Bray
14:00 GMT (UTC±0)				Venue: Bray Emmets Ground
		Report

5 January 2019 Round 3	Longford	1-16 (19) – (19) 1-16	Louth	Longford
14:00 GMT (UTC±0)				Venue: Pearse Park
		Report

==== Group 3 ====
Pos	Team	Pld	W	D	L	PF	PA	PD	Pts	Qualification
1	Meath	3	2	0	1	51	31	+20	4	Advance to semi-final
2	Wexford	3	2	0	1	51	46	+5	4	
3	Laois	3	1	0	2	37	55	−18	2	

Updated to match(es) played on 5 January 2019. Source: Leinster GAA

8 December 2018 Round 1	Laois	0-06 (06) – (20) 3-11	Meath	Portlaoise
18:00 GMT (UTC±0)				Venue: O'Moore Park
		Report		Referee: Fintan Pierce (Offaly)

20 December 2018 Round 2	Wexford	2-13 (19) – (14) 1-11	Laois	Enniscorthy
20:00 GMT (UTC±0)				Venue: St Patrick's Park
		Report

5 January 2019 Round 3	Wexford	1-13 (16) – (23) 1-20	Meath	New Ross
14:00 GMT (UTC±0)				Venue: O'Kennedy Park
		Report

==== Cross-group games ====
The three teams in Group 2 play the three teams in Group 3 with each team having a single game.

8 December 2018 Round 1	Louth	1-06 (09) – (16) 0-16	Wexford	Readypenny
17:00 GMT (UTC±0)				Venue: Darver Centre of Excellence
		Report		Referee: David O'Connor (Dublin); Attendance: 100

15 December 2018 Round 2	Meath	1-05 (08) – (09) 0-09	Longford	Ashbourne
17:00 GMT (UTC±0)				Venue: Donaghmore Ashbourne GAA
		Report		Referee: Alan Coyne (Westmeath)

5 January 2019 Round 3	Wicklow	2-10 (16) – (17) 2-11	Laois	Bray
18:00 GMT (UTC±0)				Venue: Bray Emmets Ground

== Knockout stage ==
=== Semi-finals ===
The three group winners plus the team given a bye (Dublin) competed in the semi-finals. The two winners advanced to the final.

12 January 2019
14:00 GMT (UTC±0)
Semi-final

Report

Westmeath	2-10 (16) – (04) 0-04	Longford
(HT: 1-05 – 0-01)

The Downs, Mullingar
Referee: Brendan Cawley (Kildare)

12 January 2019
19:00 GMT (UTC±0)
Semi-final

Report

Dublin	1-12 (15) – (15) 1-12 (3–1 pen)	Meath
(HT: 1-07 – 1-07)
Penalty kicks
Aaron Byrne; Oisín Lynch; Conor McHugh		✗ Mickey Newman; ✗ Thomas O'Reilly; Seán Tobin; ✗ Barry Dardis

Parnell Park, Donnycarney
Referee: Fergal Kelly (Longford)

=== Final ===
TG4

18 January 2019
20:00 GMT (UTC±0)
Final

Report

Dublin	0-10 (10) – (15) 1-12	Westmeath
(HT: 0-04 – 0-05)
Pts: Aaron Byrne 3, Conor McHugh 3 (2f), Sean Bugler 3, Stephen Smith 1 (f)		Gls: Ger Egan 1 Pts: Ger Egan 5 (1f), Tommy McDaniel 3, Ronan O’Toole 2, Kieran Martin 1, Ger Leech 1

Parnell Park, Donnycarney
Referee: David Hickey (Carlow)
