= 2023 Louth county football team season =

Louth county football team
2023 season
- Manager: Mickey Harte
- NFL D2: 3rd
- All-Ireland SFC: Group stage
- Leinster SFC: Finalist
- O'Byrne Cup: Finalist
- Top goalscorer: Sam Mulroy (in league, with 0-19)

The following is a summary of Louth county football team's 2023 season.

James Califf retired at the end of this season.

== Competitions ==
=== O'Byrne Cup ===
Games took place 4–11 January 2023. Louth were placed in Group A.

==== Table ====
| Pos | Team | Pld | W | D | L | PF | PA | PD | Pts | Qualification |
|---|---|---|---|---|---|---|---|---|---|---|
| 1 | Louth (Note: Wexford received a walkover from Louth.) | 3 | 2 | 0 | 1 | 25 | 22 | +3 | 4 (Note: Louth are ranked ahead of Westmeath as they won the head-to-head game between the teams) | Advance to semi-final |
| 2 | Westmeath (Note: Westmeath received a walkover from Kildare.) | 3 | 2 | 0 | 1 | 28 | 17 | +11 | 4 | |
| 3 | Kildare | 3 | 1 | 0 | 2 | 34 | 25 | +9 | 2 (Note: Kildare are ranked ahead of Wexford as they won the head-to-head game between the teams) | |
| 4 | Wexford | 3 | 1 | 0 | 2 | 17 | 40 | −23 | 2 | |

Updated to match(es) played on 7 January 2023. Source: Leinster GAA

==== Fixtures ====
15 January 2023
14:00 IWT (UTC±0)
Semi-final

Report

| Louth | w/o – scr. | Offaly |

Páirc Naomh Bríd, Dowdallshill, Dundalk
Referee: Keith O'Brien

TG4

21 January 2023
14:00 IWT (UTC±0)
Final

Report

| Longford | 3-13 (22) – (12) 0-12 | Louth |
|---|---|---|
(HT: 1-07 – 0-07)

Pearse Park, Longford
Referee: Keith O'Brien (Westmeath)

=== National Football League Division 2 ===
==== Table ====
| Pos | Team | Pld | W | D | L | PF | PA | PD | Pts | Qualification |
|---|---|---|---|---|---|---|---|---|---|---|
| 1 | Derry | 7 | 6 | 1 | 0 | 120 | 69 | +51 | 13 | Advance to NFL Division 2 Final and promotion to 2024 NFL Division 1 |
| 2 | Dublin | 7 | 6 | 0 | 1 | 125 | 95 | +30 | 12 | Advance to NFL Division 2 Final and promotion to 2024 NFL Division 1 |
| 3 | Louth | 7 | 4 | 0 | 3 | 102 | 99 | +3 | 8 | |
| 4 | Cork | 7 | 3 | 1 | 3 | 137 | 101 | +36 | 7 | |
| 5 | Kildare | 7 | 3 | 0 | 4 | 87 | 98 | −11 | 6 | |
| 6 | Meath | 7 | 2 | 1 | 4 | 107 | 129 | −22 | 5 | |
| 7 | Clare | 7 | 2 | 0 | 5 | 98 | 106 | −8 | 4 | Relegation to 2024 NFL Division 3 |
| 8 | Limerick | 7 | 0 | 1 | 6 | 85 | 153 | −68 | 1 | Relegation to 2024 NFL Division 3 |

Source: GAA
Rules for classification: Tiebreakers

==== Fixtures ====
| 29 January 2023 | Clare | 0-13 (13) – (12) 1-09 | Louth | Ennis |
| | | | | Venue: Cusack Park |
| | Pts: E McMahon 3 (2fs), G Cooney 2 (1m), J Malone 2, K Sexton 2, E Cleary 2 (2fs), M McInerney 1 (45), D Walsh 1. | Report | Gls: C Downey 1. Pts: S Mulroy 5 (3fs), C Early 2, D McConnan 1 (f), D Campbell 1. | Referee: S Lonergan (Tipperary) |

| 5 February 2023 Round 2 | Louth | 1-11 (14) – (17) 2-11 | Derry | Ardee |
| 14:00 IST (UTC) | | | | Venue: Páirc Mhuire |
| | Gls: L Jackson 1. Pts: D McConnon 3 (2f), S Mulroy 3 (1m ,1f), T Jackson 2, C Lennon 1, C Grimes 1, N Sharkey 1. | Report | Gls: S McGuigan 1 (pen), N Toner 1. Pts: S McGuigan 5 (3fs), P Cassidy 2, P McGrogan 2, N Toner 1, O McWilliams 1. | Referee: P Faloon (Down) |

| 19 February 2023 Round 3 | Louth | 1-15 (18) – (16) 1-13 | Limerick | Ardee |
| | | | | Venue: St. Mary's Park |
| | Gls: D Corcoran 1 Pts: S Mulroy 6 (5fs), D McConnon 3, C McCaul 1, N Sharkey 1, T Durnin 1, C Downey 1, T Jackson 1, P Lynch 1. | Report | Gls: B Donovan 1 Pts: J Naughton 3 (3fs), H Bourke 2, McSweeney 2, C Downes 1, A Enright 1, G Brown 1, C Sheehan 1, P Nash 1, I Corbett 1. | Referee: Martin McNally (Monaghan) |

| 26 February 2023 Round 4 | Meath | 1-12 (15) – (18) 1-15 | Louth | Navan |
| 14:00 IST (UTC+1) | | | | Venue: Páirc Tailteann |
| | Gls: D Keogan 1. Pts: S Walsh 3 (1f), J Morris 3, J Flynn 2, M Costello 2 (1f), R Jones 1, J Scully 1. | Report | Gls: C Lennon 1. Pts: S Mulroy 3 (2f), C Downey 3, D McConnon 3, L Jackson 1, C McCaul 1, C Grimes 1, T Durnin 1, D McKenny 1, C Lennon 1. | Referee: Joe McQuillan (Cavan) |

| 5 March 2023 Round 5 | Louth | 2-11 (17) – (12) 0-12 | Kildare | Ardee |
| | | | | Venue: DEFY Páirc Mhuire |
| | Gls: T Durnin 1, C Grimes 1. Pts: T Durnin 2, D McConnon 2 (1f, 1m), S Mulroy 2 (2fs), R Burns 1, C Lennon 1, C Downey 1, B Duffy 1, N Sharkey 1. | Report | Pts: N Flynn 3 (2f), P Woodgate 3 (2f), D Kirwan 2, D Flynn 1, B Coffey 1, J Sargent 1, B McCormack 1. | Referee: B Tiernan (Dublin); Attendance: 2,500 |

| 19 March 2023 Round 6 | Louth | 1-10 (13) – (10) 0-10 | Cork | Ardee |
| 13:00 IST (UTC+1) | | | | Venue: DEFY Páirc Mhuire |
| | Gls: R Burns 1. Pts: C Downey 2 (1f), T Durnin 2, L Jackson 2, C Early 1, C Grimes 1, C Lennon, D McConnon 1. | Report | Pts: S Sherlock 4 (2 fs, 1 45), L Fahy 2, C Corbett 1, C Óg Jones 1, R Maguire 1, T Walsh 1. | Referee: F Kelly (Longford) |

| 26 March 2023 Round 7 | Dublin | 0-16 (16) – (9) 1-06 | Louth | Dublin |
| 14:00 IST (UTC+1) | | | | Venue: Croke Park |
| | Pts: C Basquel 3, S Bugler 2, C Costello 2 (1f), P Small 1, D Newcombe 1, J McCarthy 1, B Fenton 1, C O'Callaghan 1, K O’Gara 1, P Mannion 1, L O'Dell 1, D Rock 1 (’45). | Report | Gls: L Jackson 1. Pts: C Downey 3 (2f), D McConnon 1, L Jackson 1, J Califf 1 (f). | Referee: P Faloon (Down) |

=== Leinster Senior Football Championship ===
The draw for the 2023 Leinster Championship was made on 15 October 2022.

==== Bracket ====
Preliminary round

Quarter-finals

Semi-finals

Final

Offaly
1-11

Longford
1-11

Meath
0-10

Offaly
1-12

Offaly
2-15

Louth
0-27*

Westmeath
1-11

Louth
2-10

Louth
0-15

Wicklow
2-12

Dublin
5-21

Carlow
0-10

Wicklow
0-10

Kildare
1-17

Kildare
0-12

Wexford
2-13

Dublin
0-14

Laois
2-17

Laois
2-09

Dublin
4-30

==== Fixtures ====
| 23 April 2023; 2:30pm Quarter-final | Westmeath | 1-11 2-10 | Louth | Netwatch Cullen Park, Carlow; Referee: James Molloy (Galway) |
| 23 April 2023; 2:30pm Quarter-final | | Report | | Netwatch Cullen Park, Carlow; Referee: James Molloy (Galway) |

| 30 April 2023; Semi-final | Offaly | 2-15 - 0-27 | Louth | Croke Park, Dublin; Attendance: 30,499; Referee: Joe McQuillan (Cavan) |
| 30 April 2023; Semi-final | | Report | | Croke Park, Dublin; Attendance: 30,499; Referee: Joe McQuillan (Cavan) |

14 May 2023
13:45 (UTC+1)

| Louth | 0–15 – 5–21 | Dublin |
|---|---|---|
| S Mulroy (0-10, 7f, 1'45), C Grimes (0-2), L Jackson (0-1), C Downey (0-1), C Lennon (0-1) | Report | S Bugler (1-3), C Costello (0-5, 3f, 1'45), P Mannion (1-1, 1f), C O'Callaghan (0-4), C Kilkenny (0-3), J McCarthy (1-0), C Basquel (1-0), P Small (1-0), J McCaffrey (0-2), J Small (0-1), S McMahon (0-1), D Rock (0-1) |

Croke Park, Dublin
Attendance: 40,115
Referee: Conor Lane (Cork)

| GK | 1 | James Califf (Dreadnots) |
| RCB | 2 | Dan Corcoran (Geraldines) |
| FB | 3 | Peter Lynch (Roche Emmets) |
| LCB | 4 | Donal McKenny (St Mary's) |
| RHB | 5 | Leonard Grey (St Patrick's) |
| CHB | 6 | Niall Sharkey (Glyde Rangers) |
| LHB | 7 | Ciarán Murphy (St Patrick's) |
| MF | 8 | Tommy Durnin (Inniskeen Grattans, Monaghan) |
| MF | 9 | Conor Early (Na Fianna, Dublin) |
| RHF | 10 | Conall McKeever (Clan Na Gael) |
| CHF | 11 | Ciarán Downey (Newtown Blues) |
| LHF | 12 | Conor Grimes (Glen Emmets) |
| RCF | 13 | Dáire McConnon (St Mary's) |
| FF | 14 | Sam Mulroy (Naomh Máirtin) (c) |
| LCF | 15 | Liam Jackson (St Mary's) |
Substitutes:
| | 16 | Craig Lennon (St Mochta's) for McConnon |
| | 17 | Anthony Williams (Dreadnots) for Murphy |
| | 18 | Conal McCaul (St Joseph's) for Jackson |
| | 19 | Paul Matthews (St Fechin's) for Early |
| | 20 | Ryan Burns (Hunterstown Rovers) for Corcoran |

| GK | 1 | Stephen Cluxton (Parnells) |
| RCB | 2 | Dáire Newcombe (Lucan Sarsfields) |
| FB | 3 | David Byrne (Naomh Ólaf) |
| LCB | 4 | Lee Gannon (Whitehall Colmcille) |
| RHB | 5 | Brian Howard (Raheny) |
| CHB | 6 | John Small (Ballymun Kickhams) |
| LHB | 7 | Jack McCaffrey (Clontarf) |
| MF | 8 | Brian Fenton (Raheny) |
| MF | 9 | James McCarthy (Ballymun Kickhams) (c) |
| RHF | 10 | Niall Scully (Templeogue Synge Street) |
| CHF | 11 | Seán Bugler (St Oliver Plunketts/Eoghan Ruadh) |
| LHF | 12 | Ciarán Kilkenny (Castleknock) |
| RCF | 13 | Paul Mannion (Kilmacud Crokes) |
| FF | 14 | Con O'Callaghan (Cuala) |
| LCF | 15 | Cormac Costello (St Vincent's) |
Substitutes:
| | 16 | Cian Murphy (Thomas Davis) for McCaffrey |
| | 17 | Paddy Small (Ballymun Kickhams) for Scully |
| | 18 | Dean Rock (Ballymun Kickhams) for Costello |
| | 19 | Colm Basquel (Ballyboden St Enda's) for Mannion |
| | 20 | Seán McMahon (Raheny) for Howard |

=== All-Ireland Senior Football Championship ===
Louth were drawn into Group 1.

==== Table ====
| Pos | Team | Pld | W | D | L | PF | PA | PD | Pts | Qualification |
|---|---|---|---|---|---|---|---|---|---|---|
| 1 | Kerry | 3 | 2 | 0 | 1 | 73 | 48 | +25 | 4 (Note: Kerry, Cork and Mayo are ranked by score difference. Cork are placed above Mayo because of their greater number of total points scored.) | Advance to quarter-final |
| 2 | Cork | 3 | 2 | 0 | 1 | 54 | 51 | +3 | 4 | Advance to preliminary quarter-final |
| 3 | Mayo | 3 | 2 | 0 | 1 | 50 | 47 | +3 | 4 | Advance to preliminary quarter-final |
| 4 | Louth | 3 | 0 | 0 | 3 | 44 | 75 | −31 | 0 | |

Updated to match(es) played on 18 June 2023. Source: GAA

==== Fixtures ====
| 27 May 2023 Round 1 | Louth | 1–17 – 1–19 | Cork | Navan |
| 15:00 IST (UTC+1) | Sam Mulroy 0–8 (0–4f), Liam Jackson 1–0, Ciarán Downey 0–2, Peter Lynch 0–1, Leonard Grey 0–1, Tommy Durnin 0–1, Conor Early 0–1, Craig Lennon 0–1, Dylan McKeown 0–1, Conor Grimes 0–1 | Report | Brian Hurley 0–8 (0–6f), Brian O'Driscoll 1–1, Colm O'Callaghan 0–2, Ian Maguire 0–2, Killian O'Hanlon 0–1, Seán Powter 0–1, Chris Óg Jones 0–1, Steven Sherlock 0–1, Conor Corbett 0–1, John O'Rourke 0–1 | Stadium: Páirc Tailteann; Referee: Martin McNally |

| 4 June 2023 Round 2 | Mayo | 0–14 – 1–10 | Louth | Castlebar |
| 14:00 IST (UTC+1) | Aidan O'Shea 0–4 (0–4f), Ryan O'Donoghue 0–3 (0–2f), Colm Reape 0–1 (0–1f), Stephen Coen 0–1, Matthew Ruane 0–1, Jordan Flynn 0–1, Jack Carney 0–1, Paddy Durcan 0–1, Fionn McDonagh 0–1 | Report | Sam Mulroy 0–3 (0–3f), Conall McKeever 1–0, Ciarán Downey 0–2 (0–1m), Conor Grimes 0–2, Leonard Grey 0–1, Niall Sharkey 0–1, Conor Early 0–1 | Stadium: Hastings Insurance MacHale Park; Attendance: 11,347; Referee: Noel Mooney |

| 18 June 2023 Round 3 | Kerry | 5–24 – 0–11 | Louth | Portlaoise |
| 14:00 IST (UTC+1) | Seán O'Shea 1–8 (0–3f, 0–1m), David Clifford 2–4 (1–0 pen, 0–1m), Paudie Clifford 1–2, Tony Brosnan 0–3 (0–1m), Diarmuid O'Connor 0–3, Mike Breen 1–0, Tom O'Sullivan 0–2, Dara Moynihan 0–2 | Report | Dylan McKeown 0–2 (0–1f), Ciarán Downey 0–2, Conor Grimes 0–2, Sam Mulroy 0–1 (0–1f), Niall Sharkey 0–1, Liam Jackson 0–1, Anthony Williams 0–1, Conor Early 0–1 | Stadium: Laois Hire O'Moore Park; Referee: James Molloy |

== Notable events ==
- Mickey Harte resigned as manager on 18 September.
