= 2023 Leinster Senior Football Championship =

Gaelic football season

2023 Leinster SFC
Tournament details
- Year: 2023

Winners
- Champions: Dublin (62nd win)
- Captain: James McCarthy

Runners-up
- Runners-up: Louth

The 2023 Leinster Senior Football Championship was the 2023 iteration of the Leinster Senior Football Championship organised by Leinster GAA.

Dublin were defending champions.

== Teams ==
=== General Information ===
Eleven counties will compete in the Leinster Senior Football Championship:

County	Last Championship Title	Last All-Ireland Title	Position in 2022 Championship	Last losing finalist
Carlow	1944	-	Preliminary round	1942
Dublin	2022	2020	Champions	2001
Kildare	2000	1928	Runners-up	2022
Laois	2003	-	Preliminary round	2018
Longford	1968	-	Quarter-finals	1965
Louth	1957	1957	Quarter-finals	2010
Meath	2010	1999	Semi-finals	2020
Offaly	1997	1982	Preliminary round	2006
Westmeath	2004	-	Semi-finals	2016
Wexford	1945	1918	Quarter-finals	2011
Wicklow	-	-	Quarter-finals	1897

=== Personnel and kits ===
County	Manager	Captain	Sponsors
Carlow	Niall Carew	Sean Gannon	SETU
Dublin	Dessie Farrell	James McCarthy	AIG
Kildare	Glenn Ryan	Mick O'Grady	Brady Family
Laois	Billy Sheehan	Trevor Collins and Evan O’Carroll	MW Hire Group
Longford	Paddy Christie	Michael Quinn	Glennon Brothers
Louth	Mickey Harte	Sam Mulroy	STATSports
Meath	Colm O'Rourke	Shane McEntee	Bective Stud, Tea Rooms and Apartments
Offaly	Liam Kearns	Declan Hogan	Glenisk
Westmeath	Dessie Dolan	Kevin Maguire	Renault
Wexford	John Hegarty	Liam Coleman	Zurich Insurance Group
Wicklow	Oisín McConville	Padraig O’Toole	Joule

== Bracket ==
Preliminary round

Quarter-finals

Semi-finals

Final

Offaly
1-11

Longford
1-11

Meath
0-10

Offaly
1-12

Offaly
2-15

Louth
0-27*

Westmeath
1-11

Louth
2-10

Louth
0-15

Wicklow
2-12

Dublin
5-21

Carlow
0-10

Wicklow
0-10

Kildare
1-17

Kildare
0-12

Wexford
2-13

Dublin
0-14

Laois
2-17

Laois
2-09

Dublin
4-30

== Preliminary round ==
9 April 2023; 15:00; Preliminary round	Longford	1-11 - 1-12	Offaly	Pearse Park, Longford; Referee: Sean Hurson (Tyrone)
9 April 2023; 15:00; Preliminary round	Darren Gallagher 1-4 (2fs), Joe Hagan 0-3, Iarla O’Sullivan 0-1, Mickey Quinn 0-1, Dessie Reynolds 0-1, Dylan Farrell 0-1	Report	Peter Cunningham 1-1, Cian Farrell 0-3 (1m), Nigel Dunne 0-2 (1f), Jamie Evans 0-2, Lee Pearson 0-1, Ruairi McNamee 0-1, Dylan Hyland 0-1 (1f), Bernard Allen 0-1.	Pearse Park, Longford; Referee: Sean Hurson (Tyrone)

9 April 2023; 14:30; Preliminary round	Wicklow	2-12 - 0-10	Carlow	Aughrim Park, Aughrim; Attendance: 2,000; Referee: Barry Tiernan (Dublin)
9 April 2023; 14:30; Preliminary round	Eoin Darcy 1-2 (1f), Kevin Quinn 0-4 (1f), Malachy Stone 1-0, Mark Jackson 0-2 (2fs), Mark Kenny 0-2, Padraig O'Toole 0-1, Gearoid Murphy 0-1.	Report	Darragh Foley 0-4 (3fs), Colm Hulton 0-3, Jordan Morrissey 0-1, Ross Dunphy 0-1, Jamie Clarke 0-1	Aughrim Park, Aughrim; Attendance: 2,000; Referee: Barry Tiernan (Dublin)

9 April 2023; 15:30; Preliminary round	Laois	2-17 - 2-13	Wexford	O'Moore Park, Portlaoise; Referee: Conor Lane (Cork)
9 April 2023; 15:30; Preliminary round	Mark Barry 2-4 (2fs, 1m), Evan O'Carroll 0-6 (1f, 1m, 145), Paul Kingston 0-4 (3fs), Damon Larkin 0-2, Paddy O'Sullivan 0-1	Report	Ben Brosnan 1-7 (1-0 pen, 5fs), Robbie Brooks 1-1, Sean Nolan 0-2, Paudie Hughes 0-1, Kevin O'Grady 0-1, Eoghan Nolan 0-1 (1 45)	O'Moore Park, Portlaoise; Referee: Conor Lane (Cork)

== Quarter-finals ==
23 April 2023; 3:30pm Quarter-final	Laois	2-9 4-30	Dublin	Laois Hire O'Moore Park, Portlaoise; Referee: Barry Judge (Sligo)
23 April 2023; 3:30pm Quarter-final		Report		Laois Hire O'Moore Park, Portlaoise; Referee: Barry Judge (Sligo)

23 April 2023; 4:00pm Quarter-final	Offaly	1-11 0-10	Meath	Glenisk O'Connor Park, Tullamore; Attendance: 5,041; Referee: S Mulhare (Laois)
23 April 2023; 4:00pm Quarter-final		Report		Glenisk O'Connor Park, Tullamore; Attendance: 5,041; Referee: S Mulhare (Laois)

23 April 2023; 2:00pm Quarter-final	Kildare	1-17 0-10	Wicklow	Netwatch Cullen Park, Carlow; Referee: Martin McNally (Monaghan)
23 April 2023; 2:00pm Quarter-final		Report		Netwatch Cullen Park, Carlow; Referee: Martin McNally (Monaghan)

23 April 2023; 2:30pm Quarter-final	Westmeath	1-11 2-10	Louth	Pairc Tailteann, Navan; Referee: James Molloy (Galway)
23 April 2023; 2:30pm Quarter-final		Report		Pairc Tailteann, Navan; Referee: James Molloy (Galway)

== Semi-finals ==
30 April 2023; Semi-final	Kildare	0-12 - 0-14	Dublin	Croke Park, Dublin; Attendance: 30,499; Referee: Fergal Kelly (Longford)

30 April 2023; Semi-final	Offaly	2-15 - 0-27	Louth	Croke Park, Dublin; Attendance: 30,499; Referee: Joe McQuillan (Cavan)
30 April 2023; Semi-final		Report		Croke Park, Dublin; Attendance: 30,499; Referee: Joe McQuillan (Cavan)

== Final ==
14 May 2023
13:45 (UTC+1)

Louth	0–15 – 5–21	Dublin
S Mulroy (0-10, 7f, 1'45), C Grimes (0-2), L Jackson (0-1), C Downey (0-1), C Lennon (0-1)	Report	S Bugler (1-3), C Costello (0-5, 3f, 1'45), P Mannion (1-1, 1f), C O'Callaghan (0-4), C Kilkenny (0-3), J McCarthy (1-0), C Basquel (1-0), P Small (1-0), J McCaffrey (0-2), J Small (0-1), S McMahon (0-1), D Rock (0-1)

Croke Park, Dublin
Attendance: 40,115
Referee: Conor Lane (Cork)

GK	1	James Califf (Dreadnots)
RCB	2	Dan Corcoran (Geraldines)
FB	3	Peter Lynch (Roche Emmets)
LCB	4	Donal McKenny (St Mary's)
RHB	5	Leonard Grey (St Patrick's)
CHB	6	Niall Sharkey (Glyde Rangers)
LHB	7	Ciarán Murphy (St Patrick's)
MF	8	Tommy Durnin (Inniskeen Grattans, Monaghan)
MF	9	Conor Early (Na Fianna, Dublin)
RHF	10	Conall McKeever (Clan Na Gael)
CHF	11	Ciarán Downey (Newtown Blues)
LHF	12	Conor Grimes (Glen Emmets)
RCF	13	Dáire McConnon (St Mary's)
FF	14	Sam Mulroy (Naomh Máirtin) (c)
LCF	15	Liam Jackson (St Mary's)
Substitutes:
	16	Craig Lennon (St Mochta's) for McConnon
	17	Anthony Williams (Dreadnots) for Murphy
	18	Conall McCaul (St Joseph's) for Jackson
	19	Paul Matthews (St Fechin's) for Early
	20	Ryan Burns (Hunterstown Rovers) for Corcoran

GK	1	Stephen Cluxton (Parnells)
RCB	2	Dáire Newcombe (Lucan Sarsfields)
FB	3	David Byrne (Naomh Ólaf)
LCB	4	Lee Gannon (Whitehall Colmcille)
RHB	5	Brian Howard (Raheny)
CHB	6	John Small (Ballymun Kickhams)
LHB	7	Jack McCaffrey (Clontarf)
MF	8	Brian Fenton (Raheny)
MF	9	James McCarthy (Ballymun Kickhams) (c)
RHF	10	Niall Scully (Templeogue Synge Street)
CHF	11	Seán Bugler (St Oliver Plunketts/Eoghan Ruadh)
LHF	12	Ciarán Kilkenny (Castleknock)
RCF	13	Paul Mannion (Kilmacud Crokes)
FF	14	Con O'Callaghan (Cuala)
LCF	15	Cormac Costello (St Vincent's)
Substitutes:
	16	Cian Murphy (Thomas Davis) for McCaffrey
	17	Paddy Small (Ballymun Kickhams) for Scully
	18	Dean Rock (Ballymun Kickhams) for Costello
	19	Colm Basquel (Ballyboden St Enda's) for Mannion
	20	Seán McMahon (Raheny) for Howard

== Stadia and locations ==
County	Location	Province	Stadium	Capacity
Carlow	Carlow	Leinster	Dr Cullen Park	21,000
Dublin	Dublin	Leinster	Croke Park	82,300
Kildare	Newbridge	Leinster	St Conleth's Park	8,200
Laois	Portlaoise	Leinster	O'Moore Park	22,000
Longford	Longford	Leinster	Pearse Park	6,000
Louth	Drogheda	Leinster	Drogheda Park	3,500
Meath	Navan	Leinster	Páirc Tailteann	11,000
Offaly	Tullamore	Leinster	O'Connor Park	18,000
Westmeath	Mullingar	Leinster	Cusack Park	11,500
Wexford	Wexford	Leinster	Chadwicks Wexford Park	18,000
Wicklow	Aughrim	Leinster	Aughrim County Ground	7,000

== Championship statistics ==
=== Scoring events ===
- Widest winning margin: 27 points
  - Dublin 4-30 - 2-09 Laois (Quarter-finals)
- Most goals in a match: 6
  - Dublin 4-30 - 2-09 Laois (Quarter-finals)
- Most points in a match: 39
  - Dublin 4-30 - 2-09 Laois (Quarter-finals)
- Most goals by one team in a match: 4
  - Dublin 4-30 - 2-09 Laois (Quarter-finals)
- Most points by one team in a match: 30
  - Dublin 4-30 - 2-09 Laois (Quarter-finals)
- Highest aggregate score: 57 points
  - Dublin 4-30 - 2-09 Laois (Quarter-finals)
- Lowest aggregate score: 24 points
  - Offaly 1-11 - 0-10 Meath (Quarter-finals)

== Miscellaneous ==
- Its the first Leinster final between Dublin and Louth since 1958.

== See also ==
- 2023 All-Ireland Senior Football Championship
- 2023 Connacht Senior Football Championship
- 2023 Munster Senior Football Championship
- 2023 Ulster Senior Football Championship
- 2023 Tailteann Cup (Tier 2)
- 2023 All-Ireland Junior Football Championship (Tier 3)
