= 2023 Leinster Senior Football Championship final =

- Event: 2023 Leinster Senior Championship
Louth	Dublin
0–15	5–21
- Date: 14 May 2023
- Venue: Croke Park, Dublin
- Referee: Conor Lane (Cork)
- Attendance: 40,115

The 2023 Leinster Senior Football Championship final was played at Croke Park in Dublin on 14 May 2023. It was contested by Dublin and Louth. Dublin won a 13th consecutive title.

== Match details ==
14 May 2023
13:45 (UTC+1)

Louth	0–15 – 5–21	Dublin
S Mulroy (0-10, 7f, 1'45), C Grimes (0-2), L Jackson (0-1), C Downey (0-1), C Lennon (0-1)		S Bugler (1-3), C Costello (0-5, 3f, 1'45), P Mannion (1-1, 1f), C O'Callaghan (0-4), C Kilkenny (0-3), J McCarthy (1-0), C Basquel (1-0), P Small (1-0), J McCaffrey (0-2), J Small (0-1), S McMahon (0-1), D Rock (0-1)

Croke Park, Dublin
Attendance: 40,115
Referee: Conor Lane (Cork)

GK	1	James Califf (Dreadnots)
RCB	2	Dan Corcoran (Geraldines)
FB	3	Peter Lynch (Roche Emmets)
LCB	4	Donal McKenny (St Mary's)
RHB	5	Leonard Grey (St Patrick's)
CHB	6	Niall Sharkey (Glyde Rangers)
LHB	7	Ciarán Murphy (St Patrick's)
MF	8	Tommy Durnin (Inniskeen Grattans, Monaghan)
MF	9	Conor Early (Na Fianna, Dublin)
RHF	10	Conall McKeever (Clan na Gael)
CHF	11	Ciarán Downey (Newtown Blues)
LHF	12	Conor Grimes (Glen Emmets)
RCF	13	Dáire McConnon (St Mary's)
FF	14	Sam Mulroy (Naomh Máirtín) (c)
LCF	15	Liam Jackson (St Mary's)
Substitutes:
	16	Craig Lennon (St Mochta's) for McConnon
	17	Anthony Williams (Dreadnots) for Murphy
	18	Conall McCaul (St Joseph's) for Jackson
	19	Paul Matthews (St Fechin's) for Early
	20	Ryan Burns (Hunterstown Rovers) for Corcoran

GK	1	Stephen Cluxton (Parnells)
RCB	2	Dáire Newcombe (Lucan Sarsfields)
FB	3	David Byrne (Naomh Ólaf)
LCB	4	Lee Gannon (Whitehall Colmcille)
RHB	5	Brian Howard (Raheny)
CHB	6	John Small (Ballymun Kickhams)
LHB	7	Jack McCaffrey (Clontarf)
MF	8	Brian Fenton (Raheny)
MF	9	James McCarthy (Ballymun Kickhams) (c)
RHF	10	Niall Scully (Templeogue Synge Street)
CHF	11	Seán Bugler (St Oliver Plunketts/Eoghan Ruadh)
LHF	12	Ciarán Kilkenny (Castleknock)
RCF	13	Paul Mannion (Kilmacud Crokes)
FF	14	Con O'Callaghan (Cuala)
LCF	15	Cormac Costello (St Vincent's)
Substitutes:
	16	Cian Murphy (Thomas Davis) for McCaffrey
	17	Paddy Small (Ballymun Kickhams) for Scully
	18	Dean Rock (Ballymun Kickhams) for Costello
	19	Colm Basquel (Ballyboden St Enda's) for Mannion
	20	Seán McMahon (Raheny) for Howard
