= 2026 All-Ireland Senior Football Championship =

Annual Gaelic football competition in Ireland

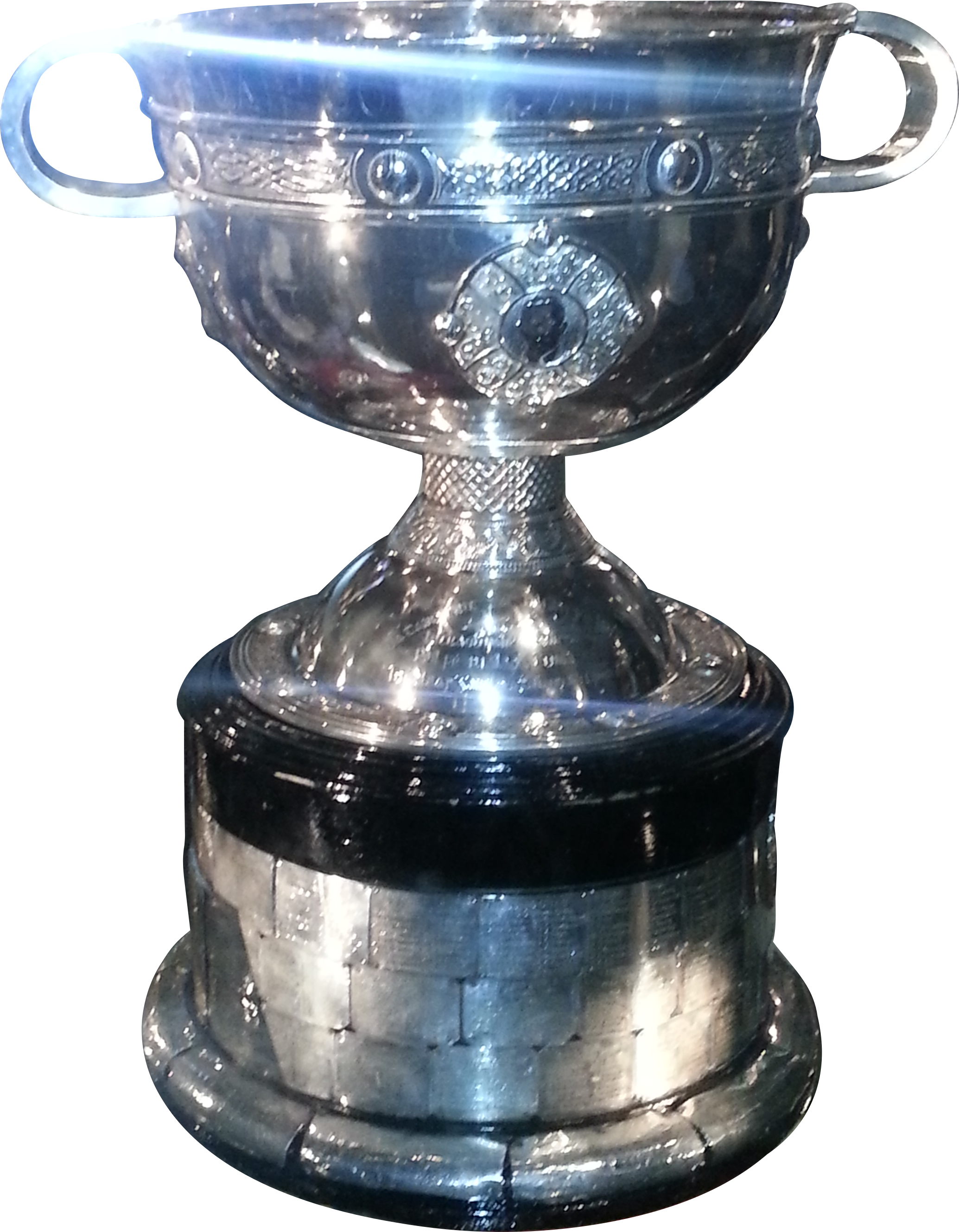

Championship details
- Dates: 11 April — 26 July 2026
- Teams: 33

All-Ireland Champions
- Winning team: Mayo (4th win)
- Captain: Jack Coyne
- Manager: Andy Moran

All-Ireland Finalists
- Losing team: Kerry
- Captain: Paul Geaney
- Manager: Jack O’Connor

Provincial Champions
- Munster: Kerry
- Leinster: Westmeath
- Ulster: Armagh
- Connacht: Roscommon

Championship statistics
- Top Scorer: David Clifford (7–50)
- Player of the Year: Ryan O'Donoghue

The 2026 All-Ireland Senior Football Championship (SFC) was the 140th edition of the Gaelic Athletic Association's main inter-county Gaelic football tournament. Thirty-one of the thirty-two Irish counties took part, with Kilkenny being the exception. London and New York completed the lineup by entering the Connacht SFC.

Mayo beat Kerry by 1–20 to 1–17 in the final to become All-Ireland football champions for the first time since 1951, bridging a 75-year gap. Kerry had been the defending champions. The bookmakers' favourites had been Kerry and Donegal, with Tyrone, Galway, Dublin and Armagh also considered contenders.

== Format ==
At the GAA's Annual Congress in Donegal in 2025, delegates approved Motion 19 to revise the Championship structure from 2026 onwards. The championship features 16 teams:

- The four provincial champions
- The four beaten provincial finalists
- The 2025 Tailteann Cup winner (Kildare)
- The seven next-ranked teams, based on final position in the 2026 National Football League
  - Position is based on standings after promotion and relegation are applied and after finals are played; therefore, the top two teams in Division 2 outrank the bottom two teams in Division 1; if the 2nd-placed team in Division 2 wins the final, they are ranked above the first-placed finisher who lost the final.

The round-robin stage is scrapped under the new format, moving to a modified double-elimination tournament.

Provincial champions and runners-up are seeded in the draw for Round 1 of the knockout stage and given home-field advantage. The sixteen games are played over two weekends: the Munster and Connacht finalists on the first weekend, while the Ulster and Leinster finalists' ties are on the second weekend.

In Round 1 the eight winners move into Round 2A, while the eight losers enter Round 2B. The winners of the four Round 2A ties advance directly to the quarter-finals. The four Round 2A losers meet the four Round 2B winners in Round 3 to decide the remaining quarter-finalists. Round 2B and Round 3 losers are eliminated.

In Round 2 and Round 3, the team picked first plays at home; a re-draw or fixture swap occurs if a selected tie is a rematch of a provincial final or Round 1 match-up.

The draw for the early stages of the competition took place on 27 November 2025.

All throw-in times are UTC+1 (Irish Standard Time or British Summer Time), except where indicated.

== Teams ==
Thirty-three counties compete in the All-Ireland Championship: every Irish county except Kilkenny. This number is augmented by London and New York, both of whom compete in the Connacht Championship, bringing the total there to seven teams. Eleven teams compete in the Leinster Championship, six in Munster and nine in Ulster.

County	Last title		2025 result	Province	Home stadium		
County	Provincial	All-Ireland	2025 result	Province	Place	Name	Capacity
Antrim	1951	—	Tailteann Cup preliminary quarter-finals (25th–28th)	Ulster	Belfast	Corrigan Park	3,700
Armagh	2026	2024	Quarter-finals (5th–8th)	Ulster	Armagh	Athletic Grounds	18,500
Carlow	1944	—	Tailteann Cup preliminary quarter-finals (25th–28th)	Leinster	Carlow	Dr Cullen Park	21,000
Cavan	2020	1952	Preliminary quarter-finals (9th–12th)	Ulster	Cavan	Breffni Park	25,030
Clare	1992	—	All-Ireland group stage (13th–16th)	Munster	Ennis	Cusack Park	19,000
Cork	2012	2010	Preliminary quarter-finals (9th–12th)	Munster	Cork	Páirc Uí Chaoimh	45,000
Derry	2023	1993	All-Ireland group stage (13th–16th)	Ulster	Derry	Celtic Park	18,500
Donegal	2025	2012	Finalists (2nd)	Ulster	Ballybofey	MacCumhaill Park	18,000
Down	1994	1994	Preliminary quarter-finals (9th–12th)	Ulster	Newry	Páirc Esler	20,000
Dublin	2024	2023	Quarter-finals (5th–8th)	Leinster	Dublin	Croke Park	82,300
Fermanagh	—	—	Tailteann Cup semi-finals (19th–20th)	Ulster	Enniskillen	Brewster Park	20,000
Galway	2025	2001	Quarter-finals (5th–8th)	Connacht	Galway	Pearse Stadium	26,197
Kerry	2025	2025	All-Ireland champions (1st)	Munster	Killarney	Fitzgerald Stadium	38,000
Kildare	2000	1928	Tailteann Cup winners (17th)	Leinster	Newbridge	St Conleth's Park	15,000
Laois	2003	—	Tailteann Cup preliminary quarter-finals (25th–28th)	Leinster	Portlaoise	O'Moore Park	22,000
Leitrim	1994	—	Tailteann Cup group stage (29th–33rd)	Connacht	Carrick-on-Shannon	Páirc Seán Mac Diarmada	9,331
Limerick	1896	1896	Tailteann Cup finalists (18th)	Munster	Limerick	Gaelic Grounds	44,023
London	—	—	Tailteann Cup group stage (29th–33rd)	Connacht	South Ruislip	McGovern Park	3,000
Longford	1968	—	Tailteann Cup group stage (29th–33rd)	Leinster	Longford	Pearse Park	10,000
Louth	2025	1957	Preliminary quarter-finals (9th–12th)	Leinster	Carlow	Dr Cullen Park (Note: Louth's main ground, Drogheda Park, is under redevelopment, so they are playing their home games at neutral venues.)	11,000
Louth	2025	1957	Preliminary quarter-finals (9th–12th)	Leinster	Inniskeen	Páirc Grattan	5,000
Mayo	2021	2026	All-Ireland group stage (13th–16th)	Connacht	Castlebar	MacHale Park	28,000
Meath	2010	1999	Semi-finals (3rd–4th)	Leinster	Tullamore	O'Connor Park (Note: Meath's traditional home ground, Páirc Tailteann in Navan, is being renovated; as such their designated home game was played at a neutral site.)	11,000
Monaghan	2015	—	Quarter-finals (5th–8th)	Ulster	Clones	St Tiernach's Park	29,000
New York	—	—	Tailteann Cup preliminary quarter-finals (25th–28th)	Connacht	Bronx	Gaelic Park	2,000
Offaly	1997	1982	Tailteann Cup quarter-finals (21st–24th)	Leinster	Tullamore	O'Connor Park	18,000
Roscommon	2019	1944	All-Ireland group stage (13th–16th)	Connacht	Roscommon	Dr Hyde Park	18,890
Sligo	2007	—	Tailteann Cup quarter-finals (21st–24th)	Connacht	Sligo	Markievicz Park	18,558
Tipperary	2020	1920	Tailteann Cup group stage (29th–33rd)	Munster	Thurles	Semple Stadium	45,690
Tyrone	2021	2021	Semi-finals (3rd–4th)	Ulster	Omagh	Healy Park	17,636
Waterford	1898	—	Tailteann Cup group stage (29th–33rd)	Munster	Dungarvan	Fraher Field	15,000
Westmeath	2004	—	Tailteann Cup quarter-finals (21st–24th)	Leinster	Mullingar	Cusack Park	11,000
Wexford	1945	1918	Tailteann Cup quarter-finals (21st–24th)	Leinster	Wexford	Chadwicks Wexford Park	18,000
Wicklow	—	—	Tailteann Cup semi-finals (19th–20th)	Leinster	Aughrim	Aughrim County Ground	7,000

== Provincial championships ==
=== Connacht Senior Football Championship ===
Quarter-finals
11 April, Ruislip
London	1-15
Mayo	0-31
12 April, New York City
New York	1-10
Roscommon	5-22
12 April, Sligo
Sligo	1-20
Leitrim	3-15

Semi-finals
26 April, Castlebar
Mayo	1-18
Roscommon	2-25
25 April, Carrick-on-Shannon
Leitrim	2-12
Galway	1-20

Final
10 May, Roscommon
Roscommon	3-21
Galway	2-22

==== Quarter-finals ====
11 April 2026 Quarter-final	Mayo	0-31 (31) – (18) 1-15	London	Ruislip
14:30		(HT: 0-17 - 0-6)		Venue: McGovern Park
	Pts: Ryan O'Donoghue 0-11 (1tpf, 1tp, 4f), Cian McHale 0-6 (2tp, 2f), Jack Carney 0-3 (1tp), Paul Towey 0-2 (tp), Michael Plunkett 0-2 (tp), Robbie Hennelly 0-2 (1'45, 1f), Paddy Durcan 0-2, Bob Tuohy 0-1, Jordan Flynn 0-1, Tommy Conroy 0-1	Report	Pts: Jim Davis 0-6 (3tp), Joe McGill 0-5 (1tp, 3f), Shay Rafter 0-3 (1f), Micheal O'Reilly 1-0, Kristian Healy 0-1	Referee: Patrick Neilan (Roscommon); TV: GAA+

12 April 2026 Quarter-final	Roscommon	5-22 (37) – (13) 1-10	New York	The Bronx
15:00 EDT (UTC–4)		(HT: 5-11 - 1-4)		Venue: Gaelic Park
	Pts: Enda Smith 1-2, Robert Heneghan 1-2, Dylan Ruane 1-1, Darragh Heneghan 1-1, Eoin McCormack 1-0, Daire Cregg 0-3 (1f), Diarmuid Murtagh 0-2 (1f), Keith Doyle 0-2, Senan Lambe 0-2 (1tp), Shane Cunnane 0-2, Conor Carroll 0-2 (2 45s), Eoin Ward 0-1, Conor Ryan 0-1, Paul Carey 0-1 (1f); Daire Cregg (red card) 35'	Report	Pts: Frank O'Reilly 0-5 (2f), Jack McKenna 1-1, Killian Butler 0-2, Jack Foley 0-1, Conor Keenan 0-1	Referee: Brendan Cawley (Kildare); TV: GAA+

12 April 2026 Quarter-final	Sligo	1-20 (23) – (24) 3-15	Leitrim	Sligo
15:00		(HT: 0-7 - 2-7)		Venue: Markievicz Park
	Pts: Lee Deignan 0-7 (1tp, 2f), Alan McLoughlin 0-5 (3f, 1tp), Luke Towey 0-3 (1tp), Pat Spillane 1-0, Niall Murphy 0-2 (1f), Cian Lally 0-1, Jack Lavin 0-1, David Quinn 0-1	Report	Pts: Barry McNulty 1-6 (1tp, 1f), Oisin McLoughlin 0-1, Ryan O'Rourke 1-0, Keith Keegan 1-0, Sean Harkin 0-2, Tom Prior 0-2, Fergal McLoughlin 0-1, Paul Honeyman 0-1	Referee: Fergal Kelly (Longford)

==== Semi-finals ====
25 April 2026 Semi-final	Galway	1-20 (23) – 2-12 (18)	Leitrim	Carrick-on-Shannon
15:30		(HT: 0-11 - 0-4)		Venue: Páirc Seán Mac Diarmada
	Pts: Robert Finnerty 0-4 (1tp, 2f), Paul Conroy 0-3 (1tp), Shane Walsh 0-3 (2f), Liam Ó Conghaile 0-3 (1tp), Dylan McHugh 1-0, Cillian McDade 0-2, Sean Kelly 0-1, Shane McGrath 0-1, John Maher 0-1, Finnian Ó Laoi 0-1, John Daly 0-1	Report	Pts: Oisín McLaughlin 1-1, Killian Gaffey 0-3 (1tp, 1 45), Jack Kelly 1-0, Riordan O'Rourke 0-2, Barry McNulty 0-2 (1tpf), Paul Honeyman 0-2 (1tp), Ben Guckian 0-1 (1f), Ryan O'Rourke 0-1 (1f)	Referee: Niall Cullen (Fermanagh); Attendance: 4,843; TV: GAA+

26 April 2026 Semi-final	Mayo	1-18 (21) – 2-25 (31)	Roscommon	Castlebar
16:00		(HT: 1-11 - 1-08)		Venue: McHale Park
	Pts: Ryan O'Donoghue 1-4 (1tpf, 2f), Kobe McDonald 0-6 (1tpf), Conor Loftus 0-2, Paddy Durcan 0-2, Jordan Flynn 0-1, Paddy Durcan 0-1, Jack Carney 0-1, Matthew Ruane 0-1	Report	Pts: Diarmuid Murtagh 1-10 (1tp, 1tpf, 2f), Darragh Heneghan 1-3, Enda Smith 0-3, Dylan Ruane 0-3, Robert Heneghan 0-2 (1f), Keith Doyle 0-2, Colm Neary 0-1, Conor Hand 0-1	Referee: David Coldrick (Meath); Attendance: 15,321; TV: RTÉ2, GAA+

==== Final ====
10 May 2026 Final	Galway	2-22 (28) – 3-21 (30)	Roscommon	Roscommon
		(HT: 1-14 - 2-8)		Venue: Dr Hyde Park
	Pts: Shane Walsh 0-9 (2tp, 1tpf, 1 45), Damien Comer 1-2, Robert Finnerty 1-1, Paul Conroy 0-4 (2tp), Kieran Molloy 0-2 (tp), Seán Kelly 0-2 (1f), Céin D’Arcy 0-1, Dylan McHugh 0-1.	Report	Pts: Darragh Heneghan 2-2, Diarmuid Murtagh 0-7 (1tpf, 2f), Robert Heneghan 1-0, Conor Ryan 0-3 (1tp), Daire Cregg 0-3 (1tp, 1f), Paul Carey 0-2 (1tp), Dylan Ruane 0-1, Senan Lambe 0-1, Keith Doyle 0-1, Conor Carroll 0-1 (1 45)	Referee: Sean Hurson (Tyrone); Attendance: 22,799; TV: RTÉ2, GAA+

=== Leinster Senior Football Championship ===
Preliminary round
12 April, Carlow
Carlow	1-7
Wicklow	2-15
11 April, Tullamore
Offaly	0-12
Laois	3-12
12 April, Longford
Longford	1-16
Westmeath	5-25

Quarter-finals
19 April, Carlow
Louth	1-25
Wexford	0-11
19 April, Aughrim
Dublin	2-16
Wicklow	2-14
19 April, Newbridge
Kildare	2-20
Laois	2-15
19 April, Tullamore
Meath	0-25
Westmeath	4-18

Semi-finals
2 May, Portlaoise
Louth	0-10
Dublin	0-20
3 May Tullamore
Kildare	0-23
Westmeath	2-21

Final
17 May, Dublin
Dublin	0-26
Westmeath	2-28

==== Preliminary round ====
11 April 2026 Preliminary round	Offaly	0-12 (12) – (21) 3-12	Laois	Tullamore
18:00		(HT: 0-8 - 2-7)		Venue: Glenisk O'Connor Park
	Pts: Dylan Hyland 0-5 (1tpf, 1f), Keith O'Neill 0-2, Cormac Egan 0-1, Jordan Hayes 0-1, Diarmuid Egan 0-1, Marcus Dalton 0-1, Harry Plunkett 0-1	Report	Pts: Evan O'Carroll 0-5, Kevin Swayne 1-0, Ciaran Burke 1-0, Simon Fingleton 1-0, Ronan Coffey 0-2, Paul Kingston 0-2 (1f), Padraig Kirwan 0-1, Rioghan Murphy 0-1, Robert Tyrrell 0-1	Referee: Paul Faloon (Down); Attendance: 2,841

12 April 2026 Preliminary round	Carlow	1-07 (10) – (21) 2-15	Wicklow	Carlow
14:30		(HT: 0-4 - 0-8)		Venue: Dr Cullen Park
		Report		Referee: Sean Lonergan (Tipperary)

12 April 2026 Preliminary round	Westmeath	5-25 (40) – (19) 1-16	Longford	Longford
15:00		(HT: 5-9 - 1-8)		Venue: Pearse Park
	Gls: Luke Loughlin 2, Brandon Kelly 2, Shane Corcoran 1 Pts: Luke Loughlin 2-2, Brandon Kelly 2-2, Shane Corcoran 1-4, Ray Connellan 0-5 (2tp), Matthew Whittaker, Conor Dillon 0-3 each, Tom Molloy, Sam McCartan (1tpf) 0-2 each, Ronan Wallace, Kevin O'Sullivan 0-1 each	Report	Gls: James Moran 1 Pts: Dylan Farrell 0-10 (4tpf, 1f), Dessie Reynolds 0-4 (2tp), James Moran 1-0, Daniel Reynolds, Paddy Moran 0-1 each	Referee: Kieran Eannetta (Tyrone); Attendance: 1,500

==== Quarter-finals ====
19 April 2026 Quarter-final	Meath	0-25 (25) – (30) 4-18	Westmeath	Tullamore
14:00		(HT: 0-9 – 2-9)		Venue: O'Connor Park
	Pts: Ruari Kinsella 0-6 (2tp), Eoghan Frayne 0-4 (1tp), James Conlon 0-4, Jack Flynn 0-4 (1tp), Jordan Morris 0-3 (2f), Jack O'Connor 0-2, Aaron Lynch 0-2, Bryan Menton 0-1	Report	Pts: Luke Loughlin 0-6 (1tp), Shane Corcoran 1-2, Sam McCartan 0-4 (3f), Matthew Whittaker 1-0, Robbie Forde 1-0, Danny McCartan 1-0, Ray Connellan 0-2, Brandon Kelly 0-2, Brían Cooney 0-1, Kevin O'Sullivan 0-1	Referee: Barry Cassidy (Derry); Attendance: 9,184

19 April 2026 Quarter-final	Louth	1-25 (28) – (11) 0-11	Wexford	Carlow
14:30		(HT: 0-14 – 0-5)		Venue: Dr Cullen Park
	Pts: Sam Mulroy 1-4 (1 pen, 1tp, 2f), Ciarán Keenan 0-1 (1tp), Tadhg McDonnell 0-4, Conor Early 0-3, Conall McCaul 0-3, Dara McDonnell 0-3, Ryan Burns 0-1, Ciarán Downey 0-1, Sean Reynolds 0-1, Paul Mathews 0-1	Report	Pts: Mark Rossiter 0-7 (1tpf, 3f), Michael Kinsella 0-2, Cathal Kehoe 0-1, Tom Byrne 0-1	Referee: Martin McNally (Monaghan

19 April 2026 Quarter-final	Wicklow	2-14 (20) – (22) 2-16	Dublin	Aughrim
15:00		(HT: 1-7 - 1-11)		Venue: Aughrim Park
	Pts: Eoin Darcy 2-2 (1 pen), Dean Healy 0-5 (2tp), Oisin McGraynor 0-4 (1tpf, 1f), Padraig O'Toole 0-1, Cian Deering 0-1, Christopher O'Brien 0-1	Report	Pts: Paddy Small 1-6 (2tp), Seán Bugler 0-5, Charlie McMorrow 1-0, Killian McGinnis 0-2 (1tp), Con O'Callaghan 0-1 (1f), Colm Basquel 0-1, Niall Scully 0-1	Referee: Conor Dourneen (Cavan)

19 April 2026 Quarter-final	Kildare	2-20 (26) – (21) 2-15	Laois	Newbridge
15:45		(HT: 1-10 – 2-7)		Venue: St Conleth's Park
	Pts: Darragh Kirwan 1-4 (1tp), Eoin Cully 0-5, Ben Loakman 1-2 (1f), Ben McCormack 0-4, Darragh Swords 0-2, Tommy Gill 0-2, Kevin Feely 0-1	Report	Pts: Paul Kingston 1-3 (1f), Daragh Galvin 1-2, Evan O'Carroll 0-3, Killian Roche 0-3 (1tpf, 1 45), Kevin Swayne 0-1, Ronan Coffey 0-1, Patrick O'Sullivan 0-1, Cian Nolan 0-1	Referee: Conor Lane (Cork)

==== Semi-finals ====
2 May 2026 Semi-final	Louth	0-10 (10) – (20) 0-20	Dublin	Portlaoise
19:00		(HT: 0-6 – 0-8)		Venue: O'Moore Park
	Pts: Sam Mulroy 0-3 (2 45s), Ryan Burns 0-2 (1tp), Dara McDonnell 0-2, Conor Grimes 0-1, Emmet Carolan 0-1, Kieran McArdle 0-1	Report	Pts: Cormac Costello 0-10 (1tpf, 3f), Paddy Small 0-4 (1 s/l), Charlie McMorrow 0-2, Nathan Doran 0-1, Niall Scully 0-1, Brian Howard 0-1, Luke Breathnach 0-1	Referee: Brendan Griffin (Kerry); TV: GAA+

3 May 2026 Semi-final	Westmeath	2-21 (27) – (23) 0-23 (a.e.t.)	Kildare	Tullamore
19:00		(HT: 1-8 – 0-10) (FT: 1-16 – 0-19)		Venue: O'Connor Park
	Pts: Brandon Kelly 1-4, Sam McCartan 0-5 (2tpf), Brían Cooney 1-0, Ray Connellan 0-2 (1f), Senan Baker 0-2, Shane Corcoran 0-1, Kevin O'Sullivan 0-1, Tadhg Baker 0-1, Shane Allen 0-1, Ronan Wallace 0-1, Charlie Drumm 0-1, Robbie Forde 0-1, Eoghan McCabe 0-1	Report	Pts: Eoin Cully 0-4, Darragh Kirwan 0-4, Ben Loakman 0-3, Alex Beirne 0-3 (1tpf), Darragh Swords 0-2 (1tp), Jack Robinson 0-2, Tommy Gill 0-1, Kevin Feely 0-1, Callum Bolton 0-1, Brian McLoughlin 0-1 (1f), Colm Moran 0-1	Referee: Martin McNally (Monaghan); Attendance: 12,086; TV: GAA+

==== Final ====
17 May 2026 Final	Dublin	0-26 (26) – (34) 2-28 (a.e.t.)	Westmeath	Dublin
14:00		(HT: 0-11 – 0-09) (FT: 0-22 – 0-22)		Venue: Croke Park
	Pts: Cormac Costello 0-8 (4f, 1 tpf), Ciarán Kilkenny 0-3, Niall Scully 0-2, Paddy Small 0-2, David Byrne 0-2, Seán Bugler 0-2, Seán Guiden 0-2 (tp), Greg McEneaney 0-2, Eoin Kennedy 0-1, Luke Breathnach 0-1, Brian Howard 0-1	Report	Pts: Jack Duncan 1-1, Brandon Kelly 0-4, Matthew Whittaker 0-4 (1 tp), Senan Baker 0-4, Brían Cooney 1-0, Ronan Wallace 0-3, John Heslin 0-3 (1 tp, 1f), Kevin O'Sullivan 0-2, Shane Allen 0-2 (tp), Sam McCartan 0-2, Shane Corcoran 0-1, Conor Dillon 0-1, Robbie Forde 0-1	Referee: David Coldrick (Meath); Attendance: 36,536; TV: RTÉ2

=== Munster Senior Football Championship ===
Quarter-finals
12 April, Dungarvan
Waterford	1-7
Tipperary	0-15
12 April, Cork
Cork	4-16
Limerick	1-16

Semi-finals
25 April, Thurles
Tipperary	1-12
Cork	4-18
25 April, Ennis
Clare	1-14
Kerry	2-19

Final
10 May, Killarney
Cork	1-15
Kerry	1-23

==== Quarter-finals ====
12 April 2026 Quarter-final	Tipperary	0-15 (15) – (10) 1-7	Waterford	Dungarvan
14:00		(HT: 0-5 - 1-3)		Venue: Fraher Field
	Pts: Seán O'Connor 0-6 (1tp, 2f), Cian Smith 0-4 (3f), Jack O'Neill 0-1, Charlie King 0-1, Eoin Craddock 0-1, Micheál Freaney 0-1, Killian Butler 0-1	Report	Pts: Michael O'Brien 1-0, Stephen Curry 0-2 (1f), Alan Dunwoody 0-2, Billy Hynes 0-1, Conor Murray 0-1, Adam Murray 0-1	Referee: Barry Tiernan (Dublin)

12 April 2026 Quarter-final	Cork	4-16 (28) – (19) 1-16	Limerick	Cork
14:00		(HT: 4-10 - 0-7)		Venue: Páirc Uí Chaoimh
	Pts: Steven Sherlock 0-4 (1'45, 1f), Tommy Walsh 1-0, Ian Maguire 1-0, Seán McDonnell 1-0, Dara Sheedy 1-0, Mark Cronin 0-3, Conor Calahane 0-3, Paul Walsh 0-2, Chris Óg Jones 0-2, Luke Fahy 0-1, Brian Hurley 0-1	Report	Pts: James Naughton 1-4 (1pen, 1f), Eliah O'Riordan 0-5 (4'45, 1f), Barry Coleman 0-2 (tp), Killian Ryan 0-1, Rory O'Brien 0-1, Cillian Fahy 0-1, Peter Nash 0-1, Mark McCarthy 0-1	Referee: Séamus Mulhare (Laois)

==== Semi-finals ====
25 April 2026 Semi-final	Kerry	2-19 (25) – 1-14 (17)	Clare	Ennis
14:00		(HT: 0-13 - 1-6)		Venue: Cusack Park
	Pts: David Clifford 1-7 (2tpf), Paudie Clifford 1-3 (1tpf), Diarmuid O'Connor 0-3, Killian Spillane 0-2, Micheál Burns 0-2, Dylan Casey 0-1, Keith Evans 0-1	Report	Pts: Mark McInerney 0-6 (2tp, 1f), Aaron Griffin 0-4, Alan Sweeney 1-0, Conor Meaney 0-2, Cormac Murray 0-1, Brian McNamara 0-1	Referee: Thomas Murphy (Galway); TV: GAA+

25 April 2026 Semi-final	Tipperary	1-12 (15) – 4-18 (30)	Cork	Thurles
14:00		(HT: 1-4 - 1-5)		Venue: Semple Stadium
	Pts: Seân O'Connor 1-6 (1tpf, 1f), Micheál Freany 0-2 (1tp), Eoin Craddock 0-1, Cian Smith 0-1 (1f), Daithí Hogan 0-1, Killian Butler 0-1		Pts: Chris Óg Jones 2-2, Steven Sherlock 0-7 (1tp, 2f), Colm O'Callaghan 1-0, Conor Corbett 1-0, Luke Fahy 0-3, Brian Hurley 0-3 (1tp), Brian O'Driscoll 0-1, Mark Cronin 0-1, Ruairí Deane 0-1	Referee: Fergal Kelly (Longford)

==== Final ====
10 May 2026 Final	Kerry	1-23 (26) – 1-15 (18)	Cork	Killarney
13:45		(HT: 0-10 - 0-13)		Venue: Fitzgerald Stadium
	Pts: David Clifford 1-6 (1tp, 1f), Tony Brosnan 0-5 (1tp), Keith Evans 0-2, Armin Heinrich 0-2, Tomás Kennedy 0-2 (2f), Mike Breen 0-1, Paudie Clifford 0-1, Gavin White 0-1, Killian Spillane 0-1, Dylan Geaney 0-1	Report	Pts: Mark Cronin 0-5 (1tp, 1f), Brian O'Driscoll 1-2 (1tp), Sean McDonnell 0-2, Chris Óg Jones 0-2, Steven Sherlock 0-2 (1 s/l, 1 45), Colm O'Callaghan 0-1, David Buckley 0-1	Referee: Paul Faloon (Down); Attendance: 32,691; TV: RTÉ2

=== Ulster Senior Football Championship ===
Preliminary round

Quarter-finals

Semi-finals

Final

Derry
2-23

Antrim
1-13

Derry
3-23

Monaghan (a.e.t.)
1-30

Monaghan
0-27

Cavan
2-14

Monaghan
0-25

Armagh (a.e.t.)
2-28

Donegal
1-21

Down
3-21

Armagh
3-33

Armagh (a.e.t.)
1-17

Down
0-14

Tyrone
1-16

Fermanagh
1-24

Armagh
2-32

==== Preliminary round ====
12 April 2026 Preliminary round	Armagh	1-17 (20) – (19) 1-16 (a.e.t.)	Tyrone	Armagh
16:15		(HT: 0-8 – 0-4) (FT: 0-13 – 1-10)		Venue: Athletic Grounds
	Pts: Oisin O'Neill 0-6 (1tpf, 3f), Tomas McCormack 1-1, Callum O'Neill 0-3 (2f), Conor Turbitt 0-2, Ross McQuillan 0-2, Blaine Hughes 0-1 ('45), Darragh McMullan 0-1, Cian McConville 0-1	Report	Pts: Conn Kilpatrick 0-4 (1tp), Michael McKernan 0-3 (1tp), Mattie Donnelly 0-3, Ben McDonnell 1-0, Ethan Jordan 0-2 (1f), Peter Teague 0-1, Ciaran Daly 0-1, Seanie O'Donnell 0-1, Eoin McElholm 0-1	Referee: Noel Mooney (Cavan); Attendance: 16, 091; TV: RTÉ2; BBC Two NI

==== Quarter-finals ====
18 April 2026 Quarter-final	Derry	2-23 (29) – (16) 1-13	Antrim	Derry
17:00		(HT: 1-11 – 1-4)		Venue: Celtic Park
	Pts: Shane McGuigan 0-9 (1tp, 1tpf, 2f), Lachlan Murray 1-3, Paul Cassidy 1-1, Conor Doherty 0-3, Niall Loughlin 0-2, Ruairi Forbes 0-1, Eoin McEvoy 0-1, Padraig McGrogan 0-1, Ruairi O'Mianain 0-1, Brendan Rogers 0-1	Report	Pts: Niall Burns 1-3, Pat Shivers 0-2, Ryan McQuillan 0-3 (1tp), Eoghan McCabe 0-3 (1tp), Conor Hand 0-1, Paddy McAleer 0-1 (1f)	Referee: David Gough (Meath); TV: BBC Two NI, GAA+

19 April 2026 Quarter-final	Cavan	2-14 (20) – (27) 0-27	Monaghan	Clones
15:00		(HT: 0-8 – 0-15)		Venue: St Tiernach's Park
	Pts: Paddy Lynch 0-7 (1tpf, 1f), Darragh Lovett 1-1, Tiarnan Madden 1-1, Emmanuel Shehu 0-3 (1tp), Oisín Brady 0-2; Favour Shehu (red card) 68'	Report	Pts: Stephen Mooney 0-5, Rory Beggan 0-5 (1tpf, 3 45s), Dessie Ward 0-4 (1tp), Micheál Bannigan 0-3 (1f), David Garland 0-2, Stephen O'Hanlon 0-2, Andrew Woods 0-2, Aaron Carey 0-2, Karl Gallagher 0-2 (1tp)	Referee: Sean Hurson (Tyrone); TV: BBC Two NI, GAA+

25 April 2026 Quarter-final	Fermanagh	1-24 (27) – (38) 2-32	Armagh	Enniskillen
17:30		(HT: 0-4 - 1-17)		Venue: Brewster Park
	Pts: Darragh McGurn 1-12 (5tp), Conor O'Hanlon 0-4 (2tp), Brandon Horan 0-2 (1tp), Jonathan Cassidy 0-1, Garvan Jones 0-1 (1f), Sean Cassidy 0-1, Conor Love 0-1, Josh Largo Elis 0-1, Mattie McDermott 0-1	Report	Pts: Conor Turbitt 1-6 (1tpf, 1f), Jason Duffy 1-2, Oisín Conaty 0-5, Jarly Óg Burns 0-4, Oisín O'Neill 0-4, Tiernan Kelly 0-3, Ethan Rafferty 0-2 (1tpf), Ross McQuillan 0-2, Darragh McMullan 0-2 (1tp), Cian McConville 0-2 (1f)	Referee: Barry Cassidy (Derry); TV: GAA+

26 April 2026 Quarter-final	Donegal	1-21 (24) – (30) 3-21	Down	Letterkenny
15:00		(HT: 1-7 - 0-11)		Venue: O'Donnell Park
	Pts: Michael Murphy 0-7 (1tpf, 4f), Oisín Gallen 0-5, Caolan McGonagle 1-0, Conor O'Donnell 0-3, Jason McGee 0-2 (1tp), Peadar Mogan 0-2 (1tp), Shea Malone 0-2 (1tp)	Report	Pts: Pat Havern 0-7 (1tp, 4f), Daniel Guinness 1-3, Mícheál Rooney 2-0, Adam Crimmins 0-4, Odhran Murdock 0-3, Ryan McEvoy 0-2 (1tp), Caolan Mooney 0-1, Ceilum Doherty 0-1	Referee: Paddy Neilan (Roscommon); TV: GAA+

==== Semi-finals ====
2 May 2026 Semi-final	Derry	3-23 (32) – (33) 1-30 (a.e.t.)	Monaghan	Armagh
17:00		(HT: 2-10 – 0-06) (FT: 3-16 – 1-22)		Venue: Athletic Grounds
	Pts: Niall Loughlin 2-1 (1f), Eoin McEvoy 1-2, Shane McGuigan 0-7 (1f), Lochlann Murray 0-6 (1tpf), Ethan Doherty 0-2, Conor Doherty 0-1, Sean Kearney 0-1, Conor Glass 0-1, Paul Cassidy 0-1, Niall Toner 0-1	Report	Pts: Micheál Bannigan 1-5 (2f), Rory Beggan 0-6 (3tpf), Dessie Ward 0-3 (1tp), Michael McCarville 0-3 (1tp), Andrew Woods 0-3 (1tp), Jack McCarron 0-3 (1tp s/l), Conor McCarthy 0-2, Stephen Mooney 0-1, Bobby McCaul 0-1, David Garland 0-1, Oisín McGorman 0-1, Karl Gallagher 0-1	Referee: Noel Mooney (Cavan); TV: GAA+

3 May 2026 Semi-final	Armagh	(42) 3-33 – 0-14 (14)	Down	Clones
16:00		(HT: 2-12 - 0-7)		Venue: St Tiernach's Park
	Pts: Conor Turbitt 2-5 (3f), Tomás McCormack 1-2, Oisín Conaty 0-5, Jarly Óg Burns 0-4, Oisín O'Neill 0-4 (1tp), Cian McConville 0-3 (1f), Andrew Murnin 0-3, Darragh McMullan 0-2 (1tp), Aaron O'Neill 0-2 (1tp), Tiernan Kelly 0-1, Peter McGrane 0-1	Report	Pts: Daniel Guinness 0-4, Pat Haverty 0-2, Liam Kerr 0-2, Ryan Magill 0-2, Barry O'Hagan 0-2 (1f), Shane Annett 0-1, Odhran Murdock 0-1	Referee: Brendan Cawley (Kildare); Attendance: 27,423; TV: BBC Two NI, RTÉ2, GAA+

==== Final ====
17 May 2026 Final	Monaghan	0-25 (25) – (34) 2-28 (a.e.t.)	Armagh	Clones
16:15		(HT: 0-11 – 0-13) (FT: 0-24 – 1-21)		Venue: St Tiernach's Park
	Pts: Stephen O'Hanlon 0-6 (1tp), Conor McCarthy 0-4, Jack McCarron 0-3 (1tp), Rory Beggan 0-2 (1tpf), Andrew Woods 0-2 (1tp), Oisin McGorman 0-2, Mícheál Bannigan 0-2(1f), Karl Gallagher 0-2 (1tp), Michéal McCarville 0-1, David Garland 0-1, Ryan O'Toole 0-1, Aaron Carey 0-1	Report	Pts: Oisín Conaty 0-6, Conor Turbitt 0-5 (2f), Oisín O'Neill 1-1, Tiernan Kelly 1-0, Jarly Óg Burns 0-3 (1tp), Ross McQuillan 0-2, Rory Grugan 0-2 (1f), Joe McElroy 0-2, Andrew Murnin 0-2, Jason Duffy 0-2, Cian McConville 0-2 (2f), Darragh McMullen 0-1	Referee: Paddy Neilan (Roscommon); TV: BBC Two NI, RTÉ2, GAA+

== All Ireland series ==
=== Team allocation and draw ===
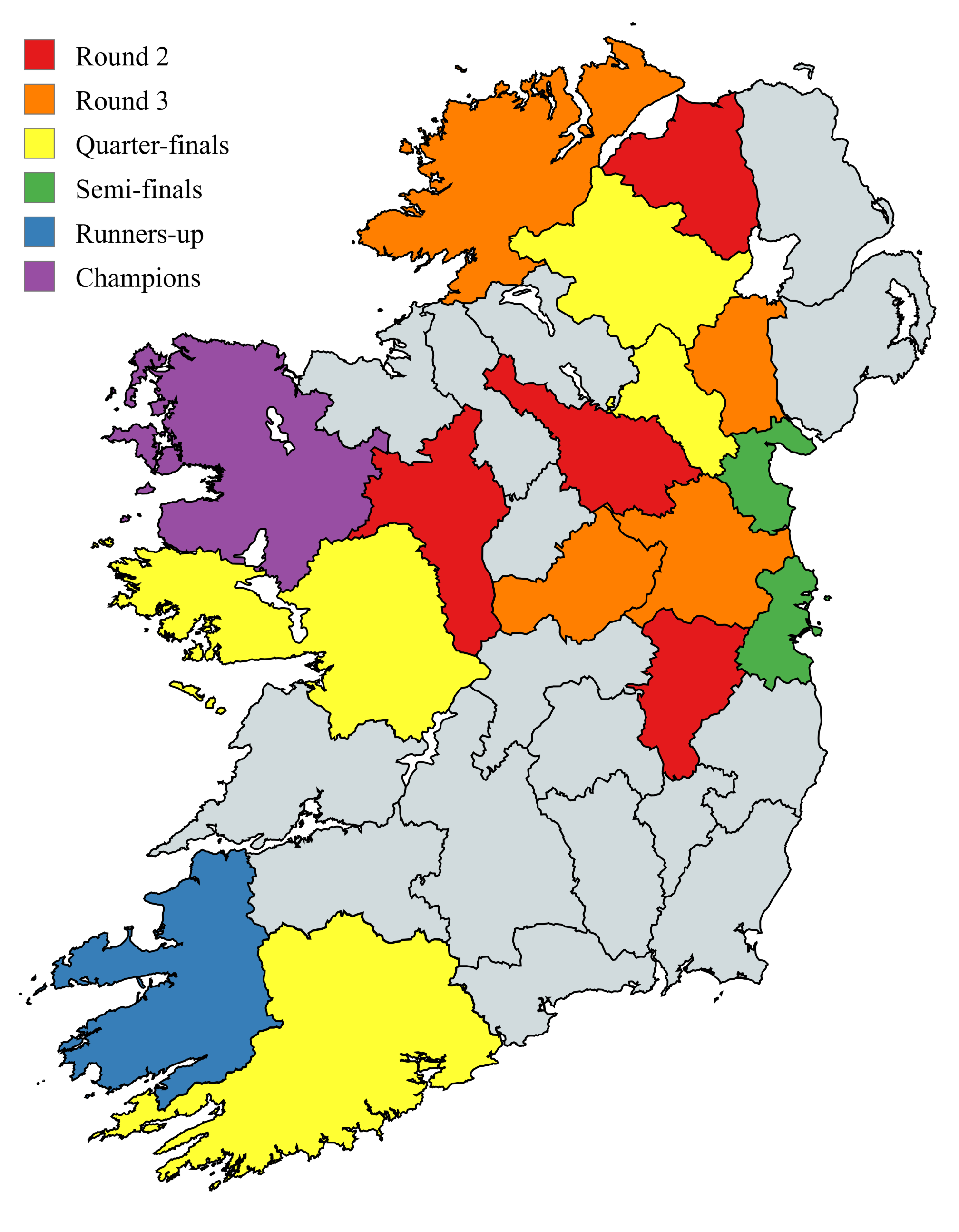
- A map showing the results of each county in the 2026 All-Ireland Senior Football Championship.
  Sixteen teams qualify for the All-Ireland Championship, as follows:
  - 8 provincial finalists; these are the seeded teams in the draw
  - 1 winner of the 2025 Tailteann Cup
  - 7 highest ranking teams (not otherwise qualified) in the 2026 National Football League (NFL). Promoted teams are ranked above teams relegated from the next highest division, with league final champions ranked higher regardless of round-robin table position. If the 2025 Tailteann Cup winner were a provincial finalist or qualified via league position, their automatic berth would transfer to the 8th-highest ranking NFL team.
- The remaining 17 teams play in the 2026 Tailteann Cup

The NFL rankings were as follows:

Place	Team
NFL champions	Donegal
NFL finalists	Kerry
3rd Div 1	Mayo
4th Div 1	Roscommon
5th Div 1	Galway
6th Div 1	Armagh
Div 2 champions	Meath
Div 2 finalists	Cork
7th Div 1	Dublin
8th Div 1	Monaghan
3rd Div 2	Louth
4th Div 2	Derry
5th Div 2	Tyrone
6th Div 2	Cavan
Div 3 champions	Down
Div 3 finalists	Wexford
7th Div 2	Kildare
8th Div 2	Offaly
3rd Div 3	Westmeath
4th Div 3	Sligo
5th Div 3	Laois
6th Div 3	Clare
Div 4 champions	Carlow
Div 4 finalists	Longford
7th Div 3	Limerick
8th Div 3	Fermanagh
3rd Div 4	Wicklow
4th Div 4	Antrim
5th Div 4	Tipperary
6th Div 4	London
7th Div 4	Leitrim
8th Div 4	Waterford
Did not play	New York

=== Bracket: Rounds 1-3 ===
Round 1; 23-31 May
Galway	3-21 (30)
Kildare	0-17 (17)
Westmeath (a.e.t.)	1-31 (34)
Cavan	3-21 (30)
Roscommon	2-18 (24)
Tyrone	3-16 (25)
Monaghan	2-20 (26)
Mayo	1-24 (27)
Dublin	1-24 (27)
Louth	4-18 (30)
Armagh	1-18 (21)
Derry	1-13 (16)
Kerry	0-16 (16)
Donegal	2-20 (26)
Cork	0-30 (30)
Meath	1-24 (27)

Round 2A; 13/14 June
Galway	3-21 (30)
Westmeath	2-21 (27)
Tyrone	0-22 (22)
Mayo	1-18 (21)
Louth	2-20 (26)
Armagh	2-19 (25)
Donegal	1-13 (16)
Cork	0-17 (17)
Round 2B; 13/14 June
Derry	1-20 (23)
Meath	1-24 (27)
Kildare	0-17 (17)
Kerry	3-22 (31)
Cavan	0-16 (16)
Dublin	1-24 (27)
Monaghan	1-20 (23)
Roscommon	0-14 (14)

Round 3; 20/21 June
Monaghan	1-28 (31)
Westmeath	2-19 (25)
Mayo	0-22 (22)
Meath	2-13 (19)
Kerry	4-18 (30)
Armagh	0-17 (17)
Dublin (a.e.t.)	2-26 (32)
Donegal	2-22 (28)

Quarter-Finalists
Galway	Advance to quarter-final
Monaghan	Advance to quarter-final
Tyrone	Advance to quarter-final
Mayo	Advance to quarter-final
Louth	Advance to quarter-final
Kerry	Advance to quarter-final
Cork	Advance to quarter-final
Dublin	Advance to quarter-final

=== Final stage bracket ===
Quarter-finals; 27/28 June
Louth	0-27 (27)
Monaghan	2-18 (24)
Cork	0-18 (18)
Mayo	0-23 (23)
Tyrone	0-27 (27)
Kerry	2-25 (31)
Galway	1-21 (24)
Dublin	1-25 (28)

Semi-finals; 11/12 July
Louth	0-15 (15)
Mayo	3-23 (32)
Kerry	2-18 (24)
Dublin	0-20 (20)

Final; 26 July
Mayo	1-20 (23)
Kerry	1-17 (20)

=== All-Ireland Championship ===
==== Round 1 ====
23 May 2026 Round 1	Kerry	0-16 (16) – (26) 2-20	Donegal	Killarney
15:00		(HT: 0-09 – 1-11)		Venue: Fitzgerald Stadium
	Pts: David Clifford 0-4 (1tp, 1f), Tony Brosnan 0-4 (2tp), Dylan Geaney 0-3, Tadhg Morley 0-1, Graham O'Sullivan 0-1, Micheál Burns 0-1, Paudie Clifford 0-1, Cillian Trant 0-1; Micheál Burns (red card) 36'	Report	Pts: Michael Langan 0-5 (1tp), Oisín Gallen 0-5 (1tp), Ciarán Moore 1-1, Shea Malone 1-1, Ryan McHugh 0-2 (tp), Peadar Mogan 0-2, Michael Murphy 0-1, Max Campbell 0-1, Shane O'Donnell 0-1, Jason McGee 0-1	Referee: Seán Hurson (Tyrone); Attendance: 21,738; TV: GAA+

23 May 2026 Round 1	Cork	0-30 (30) – (27) 1-24	Meath	Cork
17:30		(HT: 0-11 – 1-16)		Venue: Páirc Uí Rinn
	Pts: Steven Sherlock 0-14 (3tp, 1tpf, 5f, 1'45), Mark Cronin 0-5 (1tpf, 1f), David Buckley 0-3 (1tp), Colm O'Callaghan 0-2, Maurice Shanley 0-1, Daniel O'Mahony 0-1, Ian Maguire 0-1, Paul Walsh 0-1, Chris Óg Jones 0-1, Conor Corbett 0-1; Colm O'Callaghan (red card) 51'	Report	Pts: James Conlon 0-7 (1tp), Eoghan Frayne 0-5 (2tp, 1f), Ruairí Kinsella 0-5 (1tp), Seán Brennan 0-4 (2tpf), Ciarán Caulfield 1-0, Jordan Morris 0-2, Mathew Costello 0-1	Referee: Brendan Cawley (Kildare); Attendance: 8,526; TV: GAA+

23 May 2026 Round 1	Galway	3-21 (30) – (17) 0-17	Kildare	Galway
19:30		(HT: 2-08 – 0-10)		Venue: Pearse Stadium
	Pts: Robert Finnerty 1-9, Shane Walsh 0-6 (1tp, 1tpf, 1f), Céin D'arcy 1-0, Matthew Tierney 1-0, Cillian McDaid 0-2, John Maher 0-1, Paul Conroy 0-1, Damien Comer 0-1, Shane McGrath 0-1	Report	Pts: Alex Beirne 0-5 (2tp, 1f), Darragh Kirwan 0-3 (1tp), Brian McLoughlin 0-3 (1tp), Jack Robinson 0-2, Colm Dalton 0-1, Darragh Swords 0-1, Kevin Feely 0-1, Ben Loakman 0-1	Referee: Paul Faloon (Down); TV: RTÉ2

24 May 2026 Round 1	Roscommon	2-18 (24) – (25) 3-16	Tyrone	Roscommon
14:00		(HT: 1-09 – 2-11)		Venue: Dr Hyde Park
	Pts: Diarmuid Murtagh 0-8 (1tp, 4f), Enda Smith 1-1, Darragh Heneghan 1-0, Daire Cregg 0-2, Conor Hand 0-2, Conor Carroll 0-2 (tpf), Paul Carey 0-2 (tp), Dylan Ruane 0-1	Report	Pts: Ethan Jordan 0-7 (1tp, 2f, 1'45), Eoin McElholm 1-3, Mattie Donnelly 1-1, Ronan Cassidy 1-0, Peter Teague 0-1, Niall Devlin 0-1, Conn Kilpatrick 0-1, Ciarán Daly 0-1, Seánie O'Donnell 0-1	Referee: David Gough (Meath); Attendance: 16,181; TV: GAA+

30 May 2026 Round 1	Westmeath	1-31 (34) – (30) 3-21 (a.e.t.)	Cavan	Mullingar
17:00		(HT: 0-12 – 0-06) (FT: 0-22 – 2-16)		Venue: TEG Cusack Park
	Pts: Brandon Kelly 0-6, Ronan Wallace 0-4 (1tp), Senan Baker 0-4 (1tp), Sam McCartan 0-4 (1tpf, 2f), Kevin O'Sullivan 1-0, John Heslin 0-3 (2f), Matthew Whittaker 0-2, Conor Dillon 0-2, Brían Cooney 0-2 (tp), Jack Duncan 0-1, Shane Corcoran 0-1, Robert Forde 0-1, Charlie Drumm 0-1	Report	Pts: Paddy Lynch 1-4 (1tpf, 2f), Dara McVeety 1-1, Tiarnan Madden 0-4 (1tpf, 2f), Darragh Lovett 0-4 (2tp), Conor Casey 0-4 (2tp), Paddy Meade 1-0, Emmanuel Shehu 0-2, Conor Brady 0-1, Ryan Donohue 0-1	Referee: Paddy Neilan (Roscommon); TV: GAA+

30 May 2026 Round 1	Armagh	1-18 (21) – (16) 1-13	Derry	Armagh
19:15		(HT: 1-9 – 1-3)		Venue: Athletic Grounds
	Pts: Conor Turbitt 0-4 (1tp), Oisín Conaty 0-3 (1tp), Tiernan Kelly 1-0, Tomás McCormack 0-2, Jason Duffy 0-2, Blaine Hughes 0-2 (tpf), Darragh McMullen 0-1, Jarly Óg Burns 0-1, Andrew Murnin 0-1, Joe McElroy 0-1, Oisín O'Neill 0-1 (f)	Report	Pts: Lachlan Murray 1-2, Conor Doherty 0-3, Paul Cassidy 0-2 (tp), Ethan Doherty 0-2 (tp), Conor Glass 0-1, Niall Loughlin 0-1, Shane McGuigan 0-1, Seán Young 0-1	Referee: Martin McNally (Monaghan); TV: GAA+

31 May 2026 Round 1	Dublin	1-24 (27) – (30) 4-18	Louth	Dublin
14:30		(HT: 1-12 – 1-6)		Venue: Croke Park
	Pts: Cormac Costello 0-8 (1tp, 2f), Con O'Callaghan 1-3, Seán Bugler 0-4 (1tp), Charlie McMorrow 0-3, Paddy Small 0-3, Killian McGinnis 0-1, Niall Scully 0-1, Ciarán Kilkenny 0-1	Report	Pts: James Maguire 2-0, Craig Lennon 1-2, Sam Mulroy 0-5 (1tpf, 2f), Kieran McArdle 1-1, Ciarán Byrne 0-3, Dara McDonnell 0-2 (tp), Ryan Burns 0-2 (tp), Ciarán Downey 0-2, Paul Matthews 0-1	Referee: Noel Mooney (Cavan); Attendance: 16,160; TV: GAA+

31 May 2026 Round 1	Monaghan	2-20 (26) – (27) 1-24	Mayo	Clones
16:00		(HT: 0-9 – 1-17)		Venue: St Tiernach's Park
	Pts: Jack McCarron 0-5 (1tp, 1f), Bobby McCaul 1-1, Stephen Mooney 1-0, Conor McCarthy 0-2, Rory Beggan 0-2 (2'45s), Andrew Woods 0-2 (tp), Dessie Ward 0-2 (tp), Max Maguire 0-2 (tp), Mícheál Bannigan 0-1 (f), Aaron Carey 0-1, Mícheál McCarville 0-1, Oisín McGorman 0-1	Report	Pts: Ryan O'Donoghue 0-8 (1tp, 1tpf, 2f), Kobe McDonald 1-4 (1tp), Jack Carney 0-4 (2tp), Darragh Beirne 0-4 (1tpf), Jordan Flynn 0-2, Paddy Durcan 0-1, Conor Loftus 0-1	Referee: David Coldrick (Meath); TV: RTÉ2

==== Round 2A ====
The draw for rounds 2A and 2B took place on 2 June 2026.

13 June 2026 Round 2A	Donegal	1-13 (16) – (17) 0-17	Cork	Ballybofey
15:00		(HT: 1-07 – 0-05)		Venue: MacCumhaill Park
	Pts: Oisín Gallen 0-4, Conor O'Donnell 1-0, Michael Murphy 0-2 (1f), Michael Langan 0-2, Shane O'Donnell 0-1, Jason McGee 0-1, Peadar Mogan 0-1, Ryan McHugh 0-1, Turlough Carr 0-1	Report	Pts: Steven Sherlock 0-9 (3tpf, 1tp, 1'45), Tommy Walsh 0-2 (tp), Luke Fahy 0-2 (tp), Dara Sheedy 0-1, Ian Maguire 0-1, Seán McDonnell 0-1, Conor Corbett 0-1	Referee: David Gough (Meath); Attendance: 16,600

14 June 2026 Round 2A	Louth	2-20 (26) – (25) 2-19	Armagh	Inniskeen
13:00		(HT: 0-14 – 1-09)		Venue: Páirc Grattan
	Pts: Sam Mulroy 1-4 (1tpf), Dara McDonnell 1-3, Ciarán Downey 0-4, James Maguire 0-3, Craig Lennon 0-3, Conor Early 0-1, Ryan Burns 0-1, Conor Grimes 0-1	Report	Pts: Ross McQuillan 0-4, Oisín Conaty 1-1, Cian McConville 0-3 (1f), Gareth Murphy 1-0, Ethan Rafferty 0-2 (tpf), Jarly Óg Burns 0-3 (1tp), Jason Duffy 0-2, Conor Turbitt 0-2 (1f), Oisín O'Neill 0-1, Darragh McMullan 0-1	Referee: Conor Lane (Cork); TV: RTÉ2

14 June 2026 Round 2A	Galway	3-21 (30) – (27) 2-21	Westmeath	Galway
14:00		(HT: 3-09 – 1-08)		Venue: Pearse Stadium
	Pts: Shane Walsh 1-4 (1f), Matthew Tierney 1-2, Paul Conroy 0-5 (1tp), Cian Hernon 1-0, Robert Finnerty 0-3, Céin D'Arcy 0-2, Shane McGrath 0-2, Kieran Molloy 0-1, Seán Kelly 0-1, Daniel O'Flaherty 0-1	Report	Pts: Ronan Wallace 1-2 (1tp), Sam McCartan 0-4 (1tp), John Heslin 0-4 (4f), Jack Duncan 1-0, Robbie Forde 0-2 (tp), Brandon Kelly 0-2, Tadhg Baker 0-2, Senan Baker 0-2 (1m), Ray Connellan 0-1, Brían Cooney 0-1, Kevin O'Sullivan 0-1	Referee: Brendan Griffin (Kerry); Attendance: 25,400; TV: GAA+

14 June 2026 Round 2A	Tyrone	0-22 (22) – (21) 1-18	Mayo	Omagh
15:30		(HT: 0-08 – 0-08)		Venue: Healy Park
	Pts: Darren McCurry 0-6 (2f), Ronan Cassidy 0-4, Niall Morgan 0-3 (1tpf), Ethan Jordan 0-2 (1f), Ciarán Daly 0-2, Conn Kilpatrick 0-2, Peter Teague 0-2, Eoin McElholm 0-1	Report	Pts: Darragh Beirne 1-2, Ryan O'Donoghue 0-5 (3f), Kobe McDonald 0-3 (1tp), Jack Carney 0-2 (tp), Enda Hession 0-2, Jordan Flynn 0-1, Paddy Durcan 0-1, Sam Callinan 0-1, Tommy Conroy 0-1	Referee: Brendan Cawley (Kildare); Attendance: 11,921; TV: RTÉ2

==== Round 2B ====
13 June 2026 Round 2B	Monaghan	1-20 (23) – (14) 0-14	Roscommon	Clones
16:30		(HT: 1-09 – 0-07)		Venue: St Tiernach's Park
	Pts: Jack McCarron 0-7 (2tp, 1f), Stephen Mooney 1-1, Dessie Ward 0-3, Conor McCarthy 0-3, Andrew Woods 0-1, Mícheál McCarville 0-1, Oisín McGorman 0-1, David Garland 0-1, Micheál Bannigan 0-1, Ryan McAnespie 0-1	Report	Pts: Diarmuid Murtagh 0-4 (1tp), Dylan Ruane 0-3, Dáire Cregg 0-3, Jack Duggan 0-1, Cian McKeon 0-1, Conor Hand 0-1, Darragh Heneghan 0-1	Referee: Paul Faloon (Down); Attendance: 12,494; TV: GAA+

13 June 2026 Round 2B	Kildare	0-17 (17) – (31) 3-22	Kerry	Newbridge
17:30		(HT: 0-08 – 0-16)		Venue: St Conleth's Park
	Pts: Darragh Kirwan 0-6 (2tp), Jack Robinson 0-5, Alex Beirne 0-2 (1f), Brian McLoughlin 0-2 (tp), Ben Loakman 0-1, Brian Byrne 0-1	Report	Pts: David Clifford 1-4, Dylan Geaney 0-4 (1tp), Diarmuid O'Connor 1-0, Gavin White 1-0, Paudie Clifford 0-3 (1tp, 1'45), Brian Ó Beaglaoich 0-3, Joe O'Connor 0-2 (tp), Graham O'Sullivan 0-2 (1f), Paul Geaney 0-2, Seán O'Brien 0-2	Referee: Niall Cullen (Fermanagh); Attendance: 9,957

13 June 2026 Round 2B	Derry	1-20 (23) – (27) 1-24	Meath	Derry
19:00		(HT: 1-09 – 1-09)		Venue: Celtic Park
	Pts: James Sargent 1-2 (1'45), Shane McGuigan 0-4 (1tpf), Lachlan Murray 0-4 (1tp), Eoin McEvoy 0-4, Brendan Rogers 0-2 (tp), Ruairí Forbes 0-2, Gareth McKinless 0-1, Conall Higgins 0-1	Report	Pts: James Conlon 0-7, Donal Keogan 1-2, Jack Flynn 0-3 (1tp), Bryan Menton 0-3 (1tp), Mathew Costello 0-2, Seán Brennan 0-2 (tpf), Jordan Morris 0-2, Jack O'Connor 0-1, Eoghan Frayne 0-1 (f), Killian Smyth 0-1	Referee: Seán Hurson (Tyrone); TV: GAA+

14 June 2026 Round 2B	Cavan	0-16 (16) – (27) 1-24	Dublin	Cavan
14:00		(HT: 0-12 – 0-13)		Venue: Breffni Park
	Pts: Patrick Lynch 0-5 (1tp), Gerard Smith 0-3, Emmanuel Shehu 0-3, Tiernan Madden 0-2, Conor Brady 0-2 (tp), Darragh Lovett 0-1	Report	Pts: Con O'Callaghan 1-9 (1tp, 1pen, 2f), Paddy Small 0-3, Ross McGarry 0-3, Lee Gannon 0-2, Colm Basquel 0-2, Cormac Costello 0-2 (1f), Niall Scully 0-1, Seán Guiden 0-1	Referee: Liam Devenney (Mayo); Attendance: 14,486

==== Round 3 ====
The Round 3 draw took place on 15 June, and involved those teams which had won 1 and lost 1 game in the All-Ireland series. Round 2A losing teams play against Round 2B winners; another draw took place to decide home venue. Provincial final and Round 1 pairings cannot be repeated, so the pairings Kerry–Donegal, Armagh–Monaghan, Mayo–Monaghan and Dublin–Westmeath were forbidden.

20 June 2026 Round 3	Kerry	4-18 (30) – (17) 0-17	Armagh	Killarney
16:00		(HT: 2-08 – 0-08)		Venue: Fitzgerald Stadium
	Pts: David Clifford 1-10 (2tp, 1tpf, 1f), Dylan Geaney 0-5 (1tp), Paul Geaney 1-1, Joe O'Connor 1-0, Keith Evans 1-0, Jason Foley 0-1, Graham O'Sullivan 0-1	Report	Pts: Oisín Conaty 0-4 (1tp), Ross McQuillan 0-4, Conor Turbitt 0-2 (1f), Jason Duffy 0-2, Andrew Murnin 0-2 (tpf), Ethan Rafferty 0-2 (tpf), Cian McConville 0-1 (f)	Referee: David Coldrick (Meath); Attendance: 24,648; TV: GAA+

20 June 2026 Round 3	Mayo	0-22 (22) – (19) 2-13	Meath	Castlebar
18:15		(HT: 0-07 – 2-08)		Venue: MacHale Park
	Pts: Jordan Flynn 0-5 (2tp), Ryan O'Donoghue 0-4 (1f), Kobe McDonald 0-4 (1'45), Tommy Conroy 0-3, Jack Carney 0-2 (tp), Enda Hession 0-2, Bob Tuohy 0-1, Cian McHale 0-1	Report	Pts: Ciarán Caulfield 1-1, Seán Coffey 1-1, Jordan Morris 0-2, James Conlon 0-2, Jack O'Connor 0-2, Seán Brennan 0-1 ('45), Cian McBride 0-1, Bryan Menton 0-1, Mathew Costello 0-1, Jack Flynn 0-1	Referee: Paul Faloon (Down); Attendance: 15,627; TV: GAA+

21 June 2026 Round 3	Dublin	2-26 (32) – (28) 2-22 (a.e.t.)	Donegal	Dublin
13:15		(HT: 1-08 – 2-07) (FT: 2-18 – 2-18)		Venue: Croke Park
	Pts: Con O'Callaghan 1-5 (1tp, 1'45), Colm Basquel 0-7 (1tp, 1f), Paddy Small 1-2, Seán Guiden 0-4 (1tp), Cormac Costello 0-2 (1f), Ross McGarry 0-2, Brian Howard 0-1, Ciarán Kilkenny 0-1, Lee Gannon 0-1, Peadar Ó Cofaigh Byrne 0-1	Report	Pts: Peadar Mogan 1-1, Michael Langan 0-4, Michael Murphy 0-4 (1tpf, 1f), Shea Malone 1-0, Jason McGee 0-3 (1tp), Ryan McHugh 0-3, Gavin Mulreany 0-2 (tpf), Shane O'Donnell 0-2 (tp), Eoghán Bán Gallagher 0-1, Conor O'Donnell 0-1, Finbarr Roarty 0-1	Referee: Martin McNally (Monaghan); Attendance: 32,220; TV: RTÉ One

21 June 2026 Round 3	Monaghan	1-28 (31) – (24) 2-18	Westmeath	Clones
16:00		(HT: 0-15 – 2-09)		Venue: St Tiernach's Park
	Pts: Jack McCarron 1-5, Rory Beggan 0-6 (3tpf), Stephen O'Hanlon 0-3, Stephen Mooney 0-3, Mícheál Bannigan 0-3 (1f), Mícheál McCarville 0-2 (tp), Andrew Woods 0-2 (tp), Dessie Ward 0-2, Conor McCarthy 0-1, David Garland 0-1	Report	Pts: Brandon Kelly 1-3, Matthew Whittaker 1-2, Ronan Wallace 0-4 (1tpf, 1'45), Ray Connellan 0-2 (tp), John Heslin 0-2, Robbie Forde 0-2, Tadhg Baker 0-1, Kevin O'Sullivan 0-1, Shane Corcoran 0-1, Sam McCartan 0-1	Referee: Noel Mooney (Cavan); Attendance: 21,673; TV: GAA+

=== Quarter-finals ===
The quarter-finals draw took place on 22 June, involving the Round 2A winners playing against Round 3 winners. Provincial final and Rounds 1 and 2A pairings cannot be repeated, so the pairings Cork–Kerry, Mayo–Tyrone and Dublin–Louth were forbidden.

27 June 2026 Quarter-final	Cork	0-18 (18) – (23) 0-23	Mayo	Dublin
16:00		(HT: 0-09 – 0-09)		Venue: Croke Park
	Pts: Steven Sherlock 0-7 (1tpf, 2'45, 1f), Paul Walsh 0-3, Mark Cronin 0-2 (1tpf), Chris Óg Jones 0-2, Colm O'Callaghan 0-1, Ian Maguire 0-1, Rory Maguire 0-1, Brian Hurley 0-1	Report	Pts: Ryan O'Donoghue 0-8 (1tpf, 2f), Darragh Beirne 0-7 (1tp, 1tpf), Kobe McDonald 0-4 (1tp), Jack Carney 0-2 (tp), Tommy Conroy 0-1, Conor Loftus 0-1	Referee: Martin McNally (Monaghan); Attendance: 48,735; TV: GAA+

27 June 2026 Quarter-final	Tyrone	0-27 (27) – (31) 2-25	Kerry	Dublin
18:15		(HT: 0-12 – 1-11)		Venue: Croke Park
	Pts: Darren McCurry 0-10 (2tpf, 2f), Ethan Jordan 0-4 (1tp, 1f), Mattie Donnelly 0-3, Eoin McElholm 0-3, Conn Kilpatrick 0-2 (tp), Kieran McGeary 0-2 (tp), Seán McDonnell 0-1, Ronan Cassidy 0-1, Michael McKernan 0-1	Report	Pts: David Clifford 1-8 (1tpf, 1f), Dylan Geaney 0-8 (2tp), Paudie Clifford 0-5 (1tpf, 1'45), Armin Heinrich 1-0, Paul Geaney 0-3 (2f), Diarmuid O'Connor 0-1	Referee: Paddy Neilan (Roscommon); Attendance: 48,735; TV: GAA+

28 June 2026 Quarter-final	Louth	0-27 (27) – (24) 2-18	Monaghan	Dublin
13:45		(HT: 0-12 – 1-7)		Venue: Croke Park
	Pts: Sam Mulroy 0-5 (3f), James Maguire 0-4, Ryan Burns 0-4, Ciarán Byrne 0-3, Tadhg McDonnell 0-3, Ciarán Downey 0-2 (tp), Dara McDonnell 0-2 (tp), Kieran McArdle 0-1, Craig Lennon 0-1, Conor Early 0-1, Donal McKenny 0-1	Report	Pts: Jack McCarron 0-5 (2tp), Andrew Woods 0-4, Mícheál Bannigan 0-4 (1f), Stephen O'Hanlon 1-0, Oisín McGorman 1-0, Conor McCarthy 0-3 (1tp), Stephen Mooney 0-1, Max Maguire 0-1	Referee: Seán Hurson (Tyrone); Attendance: 82,000; TV: RTÉ One

28 June 2026 Quarter-final	Galway	1-21 (24) – (28) 1-25	Dublin	Dublin
16:00		(HT: 0-13 – 0-14)		Venue: Croke Park
	Pts: Robert Finnerty 0-6 (2tp, 1f), Céin D'Arcy 0-4 (1tp), John Maher 1-0, Kieran Molloy 0-3, Finnian Ó Laoi 0-2, Dylan McHugh 0-2, Paul Conroy 0-2 (tp), Cillian McDaid 0-1, Shane Walsh 0-1	Report	Pts: Con O'Callaghan 1-7 (1pen, 3f), Niall Scully 0-4 (2tp), Paddy Small 0-4 (1tp), Colm Basquel 0-4 (1tp), Cormac Costello 0-4 (2f), Eoin Kennedy 0-1, Seán Guiden 0-1	Referee: David Gough (Meath); Attendance: 82,000; TV: RTÉ One

=== Semi-finals ===
The semi-final draw took place on 28 June. Provincial final and Rounds 1 and 2A pairings could not be repeated, so Dublin and Louth could not play each other.

11 July 2026 Semi-final	Louth	0-15 (15) – (32) 3-23	Mayo	Dublin
18:00		(HT: 0-11 – 2-09)		Venue: Croke Park
	Pts: Ciarán Downey 6 (2x2p), Conor Grimes 4 (1x2p), Sam Mulroy 2 (2pf), Dara McDonnell 1, Tommy Durnin 1, Ciarán Keenan 1	Report	Gls: Conor Loftus 1, Ryan O'Donoghue 1, Darragh Beirne 1 Pts: Ryan O'Donoghue 11 (2x2pf, 2fs, 1mk), Kobe McDonald 4, Darragh Beirne 2 (1f), Jordan Flynn 2 (2p), Cian McHale 2, Paul Towey 1, Matthew Ruane 1	Referee: David Coldrick (Meath); Attendance: 82,300; TV: RTÉ2; BBC Two NI

12 July 2026 Semi-final	Dublin	0-20 (20) – (24) 2-18	Kerry	Dublin
16:00		(HT: 0-11 – 1-8)		Venue: Croke Park
	Pts: Cormac Costello 7 (1x2p, 1 '45'), Colm Basquel 3, Paddy Small 2, Con O'Callaghan 2 (2p), Charlie McMorrow 2, Brian Howard 2, Sean Bugler 1, Niall Scully 1	Report	Gls: Sean O'Brien 1, David Clifford 1 Pts: David Clifford 5 (1x2p), Paudie Clifford 5 (1x2p), Sean O'Shea 4 (1x2p, 1f), Graham O'Sullivan 2, Dylan Geaney 1, Tomas Kennedy 1	Referee: Brendan Cawley (Kildare); Attendance: 82,300; TV: RTÉ2; BBC Two NI

=== Final ===
RTÉ2
BBC Two NI

26 July 2026
15:30
Final

Report

Mayo	1–20 (23) – (20) 1–17	Kerry
(HT: 0-10 – 1-8)
Gls: D Beirne 1 Pts: R O'Donoghue 5 (2x2p, 1f), J Carney 4 (2x2p), K McDonald 3 (1 '45'), D Beirne 3 (2fs), T Conroy 2, D McBrien 1, J Flynn , S Callinan 1		Gls: D Clifford 1 Pts: D Clifford 6 (1x2p), P Clifford 3 (1 '45'), Seán O'Shea 3, J O'Connor 1, D Casey 1, G O'Sullivan 1, K Evans 1, T O'Sullivan 1

Croke Park, Dublin
Referee: Martin McNally (Monaghan)
Attendance: 82,300
Standby: Seán Hurson (Tyrone)
Linesman: Thomas Murphy (Galway)
Sideline: Seán Lonergan (Tipperary)
Umpires: Ben Woods, Niall Reilly, Mark Gilsenan, Anthony Marron (all Monaghan)

== Referees panel ==
The referees panel was reduced from 24 to 20 for the 2026 championship. David Coldrick (Meath) and Fergal Kelly (Longford) were both set to complete their ultimate season on the panel, while Joe McQuillan (Cavan) and Derek O’Mahoney (Tipperary) were excluded permanently due to their advanced age (both men had turned 50). Also absent were Jerome Henry (Mayo), who was unable to be involved because of conflicting commitments. James Molloy (Galway) and David Murnane (Cork) were both absent from this panel, having been included in 2025.

Championship Panel
Name	County	Club	Matches refereed
CASSIDY, Barry	Derry	Bellaghy	Leinster SFC quarter-final: Meath/Westmeath; Ulster SFC quarter-final: Fermanagh/Armagh
CAWLEY, Brendan	Kildare	Sarsfields	Connacht SFC quarter-final: New York/Roscommon; Ulster SFC semi-final: Armagh/Down; All-Ireland SFC Round 1: Cork/Meath; All-Ireland SFC Round 2A: Tyrone/Mayo; All-Ireland SFC semi-final: Dublin/Kerry
COLDRICK, David	Meath	Blackhall Gaels	Connacht SFC semi-final: Mayo/Roscommon; Leinster SFC final: Dublin/Westmeath; All-Ireland SFC Round 1: Mayo/Monaghan; All-Ireland SFC Round 3: Armagh/Kerry; All-Ireland SFC semi-final: Louth/Mayo
CULLEN, Niall	Fermanagh	Erne Gaels	Connacht SFC semi-final: Leitrim/Galway; All-Ireland SFC Round 2B: Kildare/Kerry
DEVENNEY, Liam	Mayo	Ballina Stephnites	All-Ireland SFC Round 2B: Cavan/Dublin
DOURNEEN, Conor	Cavan	Ballinagh	Leinster SFC quarter-final: Wicklow/Dublin
EANNETTA, Kieran	Tyrone	Omagh St Enda's	Leinster SFC preliminary quarter-final: Longford/Westmeath
FALOON, Paul	Down	Drumgath	Leinster SFC preliminary quarter-final: Offaly/Laois; Munster SFC final: Kerry/Cork; All Ireland SFC Round 1: Galway/Kildare; All-Ireland SFC Round 2B: Monaghan/Roscommon; All-Ireland SFC Round 3: Mayo/Meath
GRIFFIN, Brendan	Kerry	Ballydonoghue	Leinster SFC semi-final: Louth/Dublin; All-Ireland SFC Round 2A: Galway/Westmeath
GOUGH, David	Meath	Slane	Ulster SFC quarter-final: Derry/Antrim; All-Ireland SFC Round 1: Roscommon/Tyrone; All Ireland SFC Round 2A: Donegal/Cork; All-Ireland SFC quarter-final: Galway/Dublin
HURSON, Sean	Tyrone	Galbally Pearses	Ulster SFC quarter-final: Cavan/Monaghan; Connacht SFC final: Galway/Roscommon; All-Ireland SFC Round 1: Kerry/Donegal; All-Ireland SFC Round 2B: Derry/Meath; All-Ireland SFC quarter-final: Louth/Monaghan
KELLY, Fergal	Longford	Ballymahon	Connacht SFC quarter-final: Sligo/Leitrim; Munster SFC semi-final: Tipperary/Cork
LANE, Conor	Cork	Banteer	Leinster SFC quarter-final: Kildare/Laois; All-Ireland SFC Round 2A: Louth/Armagh
LONERGAN, Seán	Tipperary	Moyle Rovers	Leinster SFC preliminary quarter-final: Carlow/Wicklow
MCNALLY, Martin	Monaghan	Corduff	Leinster SFC quarter-final: Louth/Wexford; Leinster SFC semi-final: Westmeath/Kildare; All-Ireland SFC Round 1: Armagh/Derry; All-Ireland SFC Round 3: Dublin/Donegal; All-Ireland SFC quarter-final: Cork/Mayo; All-Ireland SFC final: Mayo/Kerry
MOONEY, Noel	Cavan	Cavan Gaels	Ulster SFC preliminary quarter-final: Armagh/Tyrone; Ulster SFC semi-final: Derry/Monaghan; All-Ireland SFC Round 1: Dublin/Louth; All-Ireland SFC Round 3: Monaghan/Westmeath
MULHARE, Seamus	Laois	The Heath	Munster SFC quarter-final: Cork/Limerick
MURPHY, Thomas	Galway	Annaghdown	Munster SFC semi-final: Clare/Kerry
NEILAN, Paddy	Roscommon	St Faithleach's	Connacht SFC quarter-final: London/Mayo; Ulster SFC quarter-final: Donegal/Down; Ulster SFC final: Monaghan/Armagh; All-Ireland SFC Round 1: Westmeath/Cavan; All-Ireland SFC quarter-final: Tyrone/Kerry
TIERNAN, Barry	Dublin	O'Dwyers	Munster SFC quarter-final: Waterford/Tipperary

== Statistics ==
=== Top scorers ===
==== Overall ====
Rank	Player	County	Tally	Total	Matches	Average
1	David Clifford	Kerry	7–50	71		0.00
2	Ryan O'Donoghue	Mayo	2–56	62		0.00
3	Steven Sherlock	Cork	0–43	43		0.00
4	Con O'Callaghan	Dublin	4–27	39		0.00
5	Conor Turbitt	Armagh	3–26	35		0.00
6	Brandon Kelly	Westmeath	4–23	35		0.00
7	Cormac Costello	Dublin	0–41	41		0.00
8	Diarmuid Murtagh	Roscommon	1–31	34		0.00
9	Jack McCarron	Monaghan	1–28	31		0.00
10	Paddy Small	Dublin	2–26	32		0.00
11	Kobe McDonald	Mayo	1–28	31		0.00
12	Robert Finnerty	Galway	2–23	29		0.00
13	Oisin Conaty	Armagh	1–24	27		0.00
14	Darragh Heneghan	Roscommon	5–07	22		0.00
15	Dylan Geaney	Kerry	0–21	21		0.00

==== In a single game ====
Rank	Player	County	Tally	Total	Opposition
1	Steven Sherlock	Cork	0–14	14	Meath
	Ryan O'Donoghue	Mayo	1–11	14	Louth
3	David Clifford	Kerry	1–10	13	Armagh
	Diarmuid Murtagh	Roscommon	1-10	13	Mayo
5	Con O'Callaghan	Dublin	1–09	12	Cavan
6	Darren McCurry	Tyrone	0–10	10	Kerry

== Notable events and records ==
- The Ulster quarter final between Donegal and Down was the first Ulster SFC game at O'Donnell Park, Letterkenny since 1951.
- Galway reached an eleventh Connacht final in a row, equalling their records of 1933–43 and 1956–66.
- Westmeath reached their first Leinster SFC final since 2016 and won their first Leinster title since 2004.
- Dublin lost a Leinster final for the first time since 2001.
- It was the first Ulster final between Armagh and Monaghan since 1938.
- Armagh won their first Ulster title since 2008.
- In Round 1 of the All-Ireland SFC, Westmeath won five championship games in the same season for the first time ever; this was accomplished with an extra-time victory over Cavan on Saturday 30 May.
- In Round 1 of the All-Ireland SFC, Louth defeated Dublin in the Championship for the first time since 1973.
- In Round 1 of the All-Ireland SFC, Dublin conceded four goals in a single championship match for the first time since 2010.
- In Round 1 of the All-Ireland SFC, Monaghan had a valid point scored by Bobby McCaul waved wide by an umpire in a one-point defeat by eventual All-Ireland winner Mayo.
- Round 2A saw the first championship meeting of Louth and Armagh.
- Roscommon were Connacht champions but were knocked out in Round 2B, equivalent to 13th–16th place; this is the worst finish by a provincial champion since the 16-team All-Ireland series was introduced in 2023 (prior to 2023, provincial champions would automatically reach the quarter-finals or semi-finals). In 2023, Connacht champions Galway were eliminated in the preliminary quarter-finals (9th–12th place); the same result was achieved by Leinster champions Louth in 2025.
- In 2026, Ulster champions Armagh and Leinster champions Westmeath were knocked out in Round 3 (9th–12th place), meaning only 1 provincial champion (Kerry) played in the last eight.
- Cork failed to reach the All-Ireland semi-finals for the 14th year in a row, matching the worst streak in their history. (Their previous worst semi-final drought was between 1929 and 1942.)
- Louth reached the All-Ireland semi-finals for the first time since 1957.
- Mayo's victory in the All-Ireland marked the first time a Connacht team had won the championship since Galway in 2001.
- Mayo won the All-Ireland for the first time since 1951, ending a 75-year drought and an eleven-final losing streak. This is the longest gap between consecutive titles by a county, with the second-longest being Louth's 45-year gap between 1912 and 1957.
