= Barry Hamilton =

Sport
- Sport: Gaelic football
Inter-county
- Years: County
- Louth

Barry Hamilton (born 1991) is an Irish athlete and sports scientist from County Louth. He played Gaelic football at minor and under-21 level for Louth. His local club is Geraldines.

Hamilton played at corner-forward on the Louth team that met a Dublin side featuring Ciarán Kilkenny in the 2012 Leinster Under-21 Final.

He attended the 2014 FIFA World Cup as a member of the Croatia bench. The team were based in Salvador, Bahia.

== GAA Honours ==
- Leinster Intermediate Club Football Championship (1): 2013
- Louth Intermediate Football Championship (1): 2013
- Louth Intermediate Football League (1): 2013
- Louth Under-21 Football Championship (3): 2009, 2011, 2012
- Louth Minor Football Championship (2): 2007, 2008
- Louth Minor Football League (2): 2008, 2009
- Louth Under-16 Football Championship (2): 2005, 2006
- Louth Under-14 Football Championship (1): 2004

== See also ==
- List of players who have converted from one football code to another
