= 2012 All-Ireland Under-21 Football Championship =

Youth Gaelic football competition

Championship details
- Dates: 22 February – 6 May 2012
- Teams: 32

All-Ireland Champions
- Winning team: Dublin (3rd win)
- Captain: Kevin O'Brien
- Manager: Jim Gavin

All-Ireland Finalists
- Losing team: Roscommon
- Captain: Paddy Brogan
- Manager: Nigel Dineen

Provincial Champions
- Munster: Cork
- Leinster: Dublin
- Ulster: Cavan
- Connacht: Roscommon

Championship statistics
- Player of the Year: Ciarán Kilkenny

The 2012 All-Ireland Under 21 Football Championship is an inter county football competition between all 32 counties in Ireland. Four competitions are contested in each province and the winners of each provincial championship enters the all-Ireland series. There are currently 2 county teams still competing for the 2012 all-Ireland Under 21 championship, Dublin and Roscommon.

== Leinster Under 21 Championship ==
=== Round 1 ===
| February 29, 2012; Round 1 | Wexford | 1-09 - 1-12 | Dublin | Belfield, Enniscorthy |
| February 29, 2012; Round 1 | M O'Regan 1-4 (0-4f), D Murphy 0-2 (0-1f), M O'Hanlon, B O'Gorman, G Cullen 0-1 each. | Report | C Kilkenny 0-5 (0-2f), P Ryan 1-2 (1-0 pen, 0-1f), J Small, J McCaffrey, E O Conghaile, H Dawson, C Reddin 0-1 each. | Belfield, Enniscorthy |

| February 22, 2012; Round 1 | Wicklow | 1-06 - 0-13 | Carlow | Baltinglass |
| February 22, 2012; Round 1 | B McCrea 1-0, T Kelly 0-3 (3f), C McGraynor, D Woods, E Woulfe 0-1 each. | Report | D Foley 0-4 (2f), C Moran, C Wall, J Kennedy (1f), M Mullen 0-2 each, M Fitzgerald, J Byrne 0-1 each. | Baltinglass |

| February 22, 2012; Round 1 | Kilkenny | 0-02 - 6-35 | Louth | Ballyraggett |
| February 22, 2012; Round 1 | B Byrne 0-2 (0-1 free). | Report | C Bellew 1-5; B Berrill 0-5; B Hamilton 1-2; S O'Hanlon, W Woods 0-4 each; E O'Neill, R Moore, B Rogan 1-1 each; B Kieran 1-0; E O'Connor; P Kirwan, N Devlin 0-3 each; S McMahon, E Duffy 0-1 each. | Ballyraggett |

| February 22, 2012; Round 1 | Offaly | 1-09 - 0-09 | Meath | Gracefield |
| February 22, 2012; Round 1 | J Ledwith (0-1), A Sullivan (0-3, one free, one '45), B Allen (0-3), M Young (1-2). | Report | P Fox (0-1), S Tobin (0-1), D Carroll (0-2, one free); S Gillespie (0-4, two frees), A Forde (0-1). | Gracefield |

=== Quarter-finals ===
| March 7, 2012; Quarter-final | Dublin | 2-21 - 0-04 | Laois | Parnell Park |
| March 7, 2012; Quarter-final | C Kilkenny 0-7 (0-3f), P Ryan 1-2 (0-1f), G Seaver 1-1, P Hudson 0-3 (0-1f), G Sweeney, E O Conghaile 0-2 each, J Smith, J McCaffrey, C Reddin, M Schutte 0-1 each. | Report | D O’Connor 0-2, J Farrell, J Finn (0-1f) 0-1 each. | Parnell Park |

| March 7, 2012; Quarter-final | Carlow | 0-03 - 0-11 | Westmeath | Carlow I.T. |
| March 7, 2012; Quarter-final | C Moran 0-2, A Kenny 0-1. | Report | C McCormack, J Heslin (2f) 0-3 each; K Reilly 0-2 (1f); G Egan, T English, S Daly 0-1 each. | Carlow I.T. |

| March 7, 2012; Quarter-final | Louth | 3-06 - 1-10 | Longford | Haggardstown; Referee: R Malone (Dublin). |
| March 7, 2012; Quarter-final | W Woods 2-1, S O'Hanlon 1-0, B Rogan 0-2 (1f), E O'Connor, R Moore (f), B Hamilton 0-1 each. | Report | R Smyth 1-2 (2f), M Hughes 0-3f, P McCormack 0-2, J McGivney, D Mimnagh, C Clarke 0-1 each. | Haggardstown; Referee: R Malone (Dublin). |

| March 7, 2012; Quarter-final | Offaly | 0-08 - 0-07 | Kildare | Gracefield; Referee: D Gough (Meath). |
| March 7, 2012; Quarter-final | S Hannon (0-1), J McPadden (0-1), A Sullivan (0-4), B Allen (0-2). | Report | K Feeley (0-3), S Hurley (0-1), P Fogarty (0-1), L McGovern (0-1), F Dowling (0-1). | Gracefield; Referee: D Gough (Meath). |

=== Semi-final ===
| March 21, 2012; Semi-final | Dublin | 4-15 - 1-09 | Westmeath | Portlaoise; Referee: J Hickey (Carlow). |
| March 21, 2012; Semi-final | C Kilkenny 1-6 (1f), P Hudson 1-4 (1f), M Schutte, J McCaffrey 1-0 each, G Sweeney, C Reddin, E O Conghaile, G Seaver, P Maguire 0-1 each. | Report | K Reilly 1-1 (1f), J Heslin 0-3 (3f), C McCormack 0-2, D Gavin, A Stone, S Daly 0-1 each. | Portlaoise; Referee: J Hickey (Carlow). |

| March 21, 2012; Semi-final | Louth | 0-10 - 0-08 | Offaly | Navan; Referee: F Barry (Kildare). |
| March 21, 2012; Semi-final | W Woods, B Rogan (1f) 0-2 each, S O'Hanlon, R Moore (f), E O'Connor, P Kirwan, B Hamilton, B Berrill 0-1 each. | Report | P Cunningham 0-5 (3f), A Sullivan, D Hogan, A McDonagh 0-1 each. | Navan; Referee: F Barry (Kildare). |

=== Final ===
| April 4, 2012; 7:30; Final | Dublin | 1-16 - 0-8 | Louth | Páirc Tailteann, Navan; Attendance: 1,200 (Estimate); Referee: Fergal Kelly (Longford); Man of the Match: Ciarán Kilkenny |
| April 4, 2012; 7:30; Final | Ciaran Kilkenny 1-7 (0-1f), Mark Schutte, Paul Hudson, Gerry Seaver 0-2 each, Jack McCaffrey, Gary Sweeney, Harry Dawson 0-1 each | | Ben Rogan 0-4f, Ruairi Moore, Cathal Bellew, William Woods, Barry Hamilton 0-1 each | Páirc Tailteann, Navan; Attendance: 1,200 (Estimate); Referee: Fergal Kelly (Longford); Man of the Match: Ciarán Kilkenny |

| GK | 1 | John Brian Carthy (St Jude's) |
| RCB | 2 | Seán George (Ballymun Kickhams) |
| FB | 3 | Kevin O'Brien (Naomh Mearnóg) (c) |
| LCB | 4 | Michael Concarr (St Vincent's) |
| RHB | 5 | Luke Fletcher (St Maur's) |
| CHB | 6 | John Kelly (Na Fianna) |
| LHB | 7 | Jack McCaffrey (Clontarf) |
| MF | 8 | Emmet Ó Conghaile (Lucan Sarsfields) |
| MF | 9 | Ciarán Reddin (St Maur's) |
| RHF | 10 | Mark Schutte (Cuala) |
| CHF | 11 | Gary Sweeney (St Sylvester's) |
| LHF | 12 | Daniel Byrne (St Maur's) |
| RCF | 13 | Ciarán Kilkenny (Castleknock) |
| FF | 14 | Paul Hudson (Thomas Davis) |
| LCF | 15 | Philip Ryan (St Brigid's) |
Substitutes:
| | 16 | Gerry Seaver (Ballyboughal) for Byrne |
| | 17 | Harry Dawson (Skerries Harps) for Ryan |
| | 18 | John Small (Ballymun Kickhams) for Concarr |
| | 19 | Paul Maguire (St Jude's) for Hudson |
| | 20 | Eoghan Keogh (Raheny) for Ó Conghaile |

| GK | 1 | Joe Flanagan (O'Raghallaighs) |
| RCB | 2 | Dermot Campbell (Dreadnots) |
| FB | 3 | Ciarán Murray (Dundalk Young Irelands) |
| LCB | 4 | Tiarnan Hand (Geraldines) |
| RHB | 5 | Patrick Reilly (St Bride's) |
| CHB | 6 | Anthony Williams (Dreadnots) |
| LHB | 7 | Michael McKeown (Mattock Rangers) |
| MF | 8 | Eoin O'Connor (St Patrick's) (c) |
| MF | 9 | Shane O'Hanlon (Geraldines) |
| RHF | 10 | Cathal Bellew (Kilkerley Emmets) |
| CHF | 11 | Peter Kirwan (Dreadnots) |
| LHF | 12 | Ruairí Moore (O'Raghallaighs) |
| RCF | 13 | Ben Rogan (O'Raghallaighs) |
| FF | 14 | William Woods (Naomh Fionnbarra) |
| LCF | 15 | Barry Hamilton (Geraldines) |
Substitutes:
| | 16 | Brian Berrill (Naomh Máirtín) for Bellew |
| | 17 | Eoghan Duffy (St Fechin's) for Kirwan |
| | 18 | Shane McMahon (St Mochta's) for Reilly |
| | 19 | Seán Donnelly (Cooley Kickhams) for Hamilton |

== Munster Under 21 Championship ==
=== Quarter-finals ===
| March 14, 2012; Quarter-final | Tipperary | 0-05 - 0-11 | Kerry | Semple Stadium; Referee: C Lane (Cork). |
| March 14, 2012; Quarter-final | D Leahy (0-1), A Cleere (0-1), L Treacy (0-1), M Quinlivan (0-1), L McGrath (0-1). | Report | P Kilkenny (0-10), K Hurley (0-2), C Cox (0-4), S O'Brien (0-4). | Semple Stadium; Referee: C Lane (Cork). |

| March 14, 2012; Quarter-final | Limerick | 0-10 - 2-07 | Clare | Gaelic Grounds; Referee: D O'Mahony (Tipperary). |
| March 14, 2012; Quarter-final | I Corbett (0-1); D O'Connor (0-2), E O'Connor (0-5), F O'Riordan (0-1), J Lee (0-1). | Report | S Tierney (0-3), D O'Neill (0-2), E Finucane (0-1), C McInerney (2-1). | Gaelic Grounds; Referee: D O'Mahony (Tipperary). |

=== Semi-finals ===
| March 28, 2012; Semi-final | Waterford | 1-04 - 4-26 | Kerry | Tralee; Referee: K O'Brien (Tipperary). |
| March 28, 2012; Semi-final | B O'Connor 1-0, P Power 0-2f, G Nugent, R Cahill 0-1 each. | Report | C Cox (2f) 1-7, K Hurley 1-5, S O'Brien 1-2, I Galvin 1-1, E O'Connor (1f) 0-3, C Brady, S O'Carroll, M Reen 0-2 each, J Walsh, G O'Grady 0-1 each. | Tralee; Referee: K O'Brien (Tipperary). |

| March 28, 2012; Semi-final | Cork | 3-15 - 1-06 | Clare | Páirc Uí Rinn; Referee: P O'Sullivan (Kerry). |
| March 28, 2012; Semi-final | J O'Rourke 0-5, L Connolly 1-2 (0-1f), B Hurley 0-4, M Sugrue 1-1, J Wall 1-0, K Hallissey, D Drake, D Mac Eoin 0-1 each. | Report | D O'Neill 1-0, C McInerney 0-2 (1f), D O'Neill, S Malone, S O'Driscoll, P Dillon 0-1 each. | Páirc Uí Rinn; Referee: P O'Sullivan (Kerry). |

=== Final ===
| April 11, 2012; 7:30; Final | Cork | 2-12 - 1-14 (AET) | Kerry | Tralee; Referee: K OBrien (Tipperary). |
| April 11, 2012; 7:30; Final | A Cronin (0-1), J Wall (0-1); R Deane (0-1), D Óg Hodnett (1-1), J O'Rourke (0-1), B Hurley (0-4, 0-2 frees), D McEoin (0-2). | Report | S O'Carroll (0-2, 0-1 sideline), C Brady (1-0), C Cox (0-8, 0-7 frees), K Hurley (0-1), G O'Grady (0-2). | Tralee; Referee: K OBrien (Tipperary). |

== Connacht Under 21 Championship ==
=== Preliminary round ===
| March 14, 2012; Preliminary round | Mayo | 1-14 - 0-15 | Galway | Referee: M Duffy (Sligo). |
| March 14, 2012; Preliminary round | C O'Connor (0-9), C O'Shea (1-0), E Regan (0-2), D Coen (0-2), M Forde (0-1). | Report | P Ó Gríofa (0-4), E Monahan (0-4), P Cunningham (0-2), C Costello (0-1), C Rabbittte (0-1), P Sweeney (0-1), N Walsh (0-1), A Varley (0-1). | Referee: M Duffy (Sligo). |

=== Semi-final ===
| March 21, 2012; Semi-final | Roscommon | 1-11 - 0-10 | Mayo | Referee: R McBrien (Leitrim). |
| March 21, 2012; Semi-final | D Smith 1-4 (3f), N Kilroy, C Compton, C Connolly, N Daly, F Cregg, S Oates, C Murtagh 0-1 each. | Report | C O'Connor (3f), C O'Shea 0-3 each, E Regan (1f) 0-2, J Shaughnessy (1f), A Walsh ('45) 0-1 each. | Referee: R McBrien (Leitrim). |

| March 24, 2012; Semi-final | Sligo | 0-14 - 0-08 | Leitrim | Markievicz Park; Referee: S O' Hehir (Galway) |
| March 24, 2012; Semi-final | D Maye (0-3, 1f), D Coffey (0-1), N Murphy (0-7, 3f), J Rogers (0-2), E Doherty (0-1). | Report | A Hickey (0-5, 4f), S Moran (0-1), M Beirne (0-1), M Quinn (0-1). | Markievicz Park; Referee: S O' Hehir (Galway) |

=== Final ===
| April 07, 2012; Final | Roscommon | 1-13 - 0-08 | Sligo | Dr. Hyde Park; Referee: Ray McBrien (Leitrim). |
| April 07, 2012; Final | D Smith 1-6 (1-0 pen, 0-5f), S Oates, C Compton 0-2 each, C Connolly, C Daly, F Cregg (0-1f) 0-1 each. | Report | B Egan 0-3 (0-2f, 0-1 '45'), N Murphy 0-2 (0-1f), D Maye, P Hughes, J Rodgers 0-1 each. | Dr. Hyde Park; Referee: Ray McBrien (Leitrim). |

== Ulster Under 21 Championship ==
=== Round 1 ===
| March 14, 2012; Round 1 | Fermanagh | 1-03 - 1-14 | Tyrone | Brewster Park; Referee: G Corrigan. |
| March 14, 2012; Round 1 | R Corrigan (1-0), R Lyons (0-1), S Quigley (0-1), B Owens (0-1). | Report | N Sludden (0-1), T McCann (0-1), S Tierney (0-1), T Canavan (0-1), D McCurry (0-3), C McAliskey (1-3), R O'Neill (0-1), P Mallon (0-1), J McCullagh (0-2). | Brewster Park; Referee: G Corrigan. |

=== Quarter-finals ===
| March 21, 2012; Quarter-final | Cavan | 1-11 - 1-05 | Armagh | Kingspan Breffni Park; Referee: F Cleary (Fermanagh). |
| March 21, 2012; Quarter-final | K Tierney 0-7 (2f), C Conroy 1-0, F Flanagan, J Brady, P Leddy, PP O'Hara 0-1 each. | Report | R Tasker 1-3 (2f), A Forker (1f), J Donnelly 0-1 each. | Kingspan Breffni Park; Referee: F Cleary (Fermanagh). |

| March 21, 2012; Quarter-final | Derry | 3-12 - 1-03 | Monaghan | Celtic Park; Referee: S McLaughlin (Donegal). |
| March 21, 2012; Quarter-final | E McGuckian 2-1, F Duffin 1-0, B Herron (2f), C Spiers, B Quigg 0-2 each, R Moore, A Devlin (1f), R Ferris, C Bradley, F Bell 0-1 each. | Report | S Sherry 1-0, T Kerr (1f), P Dooney, D McKenna 0-1 each. | Celtic Park; Referee: S McLaughlin (Donegal). |

| March 21, 2012; Quarter-final | Down | 2-11 - 1-09 | Antrim | Páirc Esler; Referee: C O'Hagan (Tyrone). |
| March 21, 2012; Quarter-final | D O'Hare (3f) 1-4, R McGarry (1f) 1-3, D Savage, M Bagnall, N McParland, R O'Hare 0-1 each. | Report | H McNulty 1-1, D Lynch 0-3, R Murray, M Johnson, P McBride, E Gallagher, C Sheerin 0-1 each. | Páirc Esler; Referee: C O'Hagan (Tyrone). |

| March 21, 2012; Quarter-final | Tyrone | 0-12 - 0-06 | Donegal | Omagh; Attendance: Report; Referee: M McErlane (Derry). |
| March 21, 2012; Quarter-final | D McCurry 0-5 (2f), R Donnelly 0-2, T Canavan, C Clarke, S Tierney, C McAliskey, S Warnock 0-1 each. | | P McBrearty 0-3 (1f), S McGarvey 0-2 (1 '45), D Molloy 0-1. | Omagh; Attendance: Report; Referee: M McErlane (Derry). |

=== Semi-finals ===
| April 04, 2012; Semi-final | Down | 1-08 - 0-16 | Tyrone | Casement Park |
| April 04, 2012; Semi-final | K McClorey (0-1)C Gough (0-1), M Bagnall (0-1); D Savage (0-3), R McGarry (0-1), D O'Hare (1-0), S McArdle (0-1). | Report | C Clarke (0-1), T Canavan (0-2), R Donnelly (0-2); D McCurry (0-4), C McAliskey (0-3), C Daly (0-3), P Mallon (0-1). | Casement Park |

| April 04, 2012; Semi-final | Cavan | 2-08 - 1-09 | Derry | Enniskillen |
| April 04, 2012; Semi-final | J McLoughlin (0-1), J Dillon (0-2), K Tierney (1-5), P King (1-0). | Report | A Devlin (0-3), E McGuckian (1-3), E Bradley (0-3). | Enniskillen |

=== Final ===
| April 11, 2012; 8:00; Final | Cavan | 1-10 - 0-10 | Tyrone | Brewster Park; Referee: B Cassidy (Derry). |
| April 11, 2012; 8:00; Final | D Sexton (1-0, pen), J Dillon (0-1), R Lynch (0-1), J Brady (0-3, 0-2 frees), K Tierney (0-5, frees). | Report | B Tierney (0-1), N Sludden (0-1), H Og Conlan (0-1), S Tierney (0-1), T Canavan (0-1, free), R Donnelly (0-2, frees), D McCurry (0-3, frees). | Brewster Park; Referee: B Cassidy (Derry). |

== All-Ireland Series ==
=== Semi-finals ===
| April 21, 2012; Final | Roscommon | 2-07 - 2-02 | Cavan | Pearse Park; Referee: C Reilly (Meath) |
| April 21, 2012; Final | C Compton 1-1, C Daly 1-0, S Smith 0-4 (1f), N Kilroy, C Murtagh 0-1 each. | Report | K Tierney 2-0, J Dillon, C Conway 0-1 each. | Pearse Park; Referee: C Reilly (Meath) |

| April 21, 2012; Final | Dublin | 3-11 - 0-14 | Cork | Portlaoise; Referee: M Higgins (Fermanagh). |
| April 21, 2012; Final | P Ryan 2-3 (1-0 pen, 0-1 45); J McCaffrey 1-0; E Ó Conghaile, P Hudson 0-2 each; D Byrne, G Sweeney, C Kilkenny, P Maguire 0-1. | Report | B Hurley 0-6(5fs); J O’Rourke, L Connolly (1 45) 0-2 each; D Óg Hodnett, M Sugrue, K Hallissey (f), D McEoin (f) 0-1 each. | Portlaoise; Referee: M Higgins (Fermanagh). |

=== Final ===
| May 06, 2012; 14:00; Final | Dublin | 2-12 - 0-11 | Roscommon | Tullamore |
| May 06, 2012; 14:00; Final | JB Carthy; M Concarr, K O'Brien, S George; L Fletcher, J Kelly (0-1), J McCaffrey; E O Conghaile, C Reddin; D Byrne, G Sweeney, M Schutte; C Kilkenny (0-4), P Ryan (0-1), P Hudson (1-4). Subs: P Maguire, G Seaver (0-1), H Dawson (0-1), P O'Higgins, P Mannion (1-0). | Report | T Lowe: C Cafferkey, C Duignan, D Murray; C Daly, P Brogan, R Stack; C Shine, N Daly; S Oates, N Kilroy, D Keane (0-2); C Connolly (0-2), C Compton (0-3), D Smith (0-4). Subs: J McManus, F Cregg, C Murtagh, F Kelly. | Tullamore |
