= Philip Ryan (Gaelic footballer) =

Irish Gaelic footballer

Personal information
- Born: Dublin, Ireland

Sport
- Sport: Gaelic football
- Position: Forward
Club
- Years: Club
- St Brigid's
Inter-county titles
- All-Irelands: 1
- NFL: 4

Philip Ryan is a Gaelic footballer who plays for the St Brigid's club and previously for the Dublin county team.

In May 2021, Ryan was added to the Tipperary county team for the 2021 season.

== Honours ==
- Leinster Under-21 Football Championship (1): 2012
- All-Ireland Under-21 Football Championship (1): 2012
- Leinster Senior Football Championship (1): 2015
- All-Ireland Senior Football Championship (1): 2015
- National Football League (4): 2013, 2014, 2015, 2016
