= Bobby McCaul =

Irish Gaelic footballer

Personal information
- Died: 2005/2006

Sport
- Sport: Gaelic football
Club
- Years: Club
- Aughnamullen
Inter-county
- Years: County
- Monaghan

Bobby McCaul is an Irish Gaelic footballer who plays for Aughnamullen and the Mongahan county team.

He made his senior championship debut against Cavan in the 2026 Ulster Senior Football Championship quarter-final, then played against Derry in the semi-final, before scoring 1–1 against Mayo in the 2026 All-Ireland Senior Football Championship then being stretchered off injured. Before he was stretchered off he also had a shot controversially declared wide, even though analysts disagreed and replays showed this was not what happened. Monaghan's eventual one-point loss was overshadowed however by the injury, which was not his first.

Educated at Our Lady's Castleblayney, he has an Ulster Colleges All-Star from 2024. He played for the Monaghan U20s in 2025.
