= James Califf =

Irish Gaelic footballer

Personal information
- Born: 1990 or 1991 (age 35–36)

Sport
- Sport: Gaelic football
- Position: Goalkeeper
Club
- Years: Club
- Dreadnots
Inter-county
Years	County	Apps (scores)
	Louth	62
- Leinster titles: 0

James Califf is an Irish Gaelic footballer who plays for Dreadnots and the Louth county team.

Califf played for Louth as goalkeeper in the 2023 Leinster Senior Football Championship final when Mickey Harte managed. He had been first choice for most of Harte's reign, and was seen as the team's "most influential player". Califf was the last surviving member of Louth's previous Leinster semi-final appearance. He retired after that, with 62 appearances across 14 seasons. Califf was previously a midfielder. Gavin Devlin converted him.
