= Anthony Williams (Gaelic footballer) =

Irish Gaelic footballer

Sport
- Sport: Gaelic football
Club
- Years: Club
- Dreadnots
Inter-county
- Years: County
- Louth

Anthony Williams is an Irish Gaelic footballer who plays as a defender for Dreadnots and the Louth county team.

Williams played in the 2012 Leinster Under-21 Football Championship final. He first played senior inter-county football in 2015. Within two years, he was viewed as a possible successor to Derek Maguire. By the end of the decade he had established himself as one of Louth's key players. He played for Louth in the 2023 Leinster Senior Football Championship final.

Williams was named as a substitute for the 2026 All-Ireland Senior Football Championship semi-final match against Mayo.
