= Paul Mannion =

Irish Gaelic footballer (born 1993)

Personal information
- Native name: Pól Ó Mainnín (Irish)
- Born: 25 May 1993 (age 33) Dublin, Ireland
- Height: 1.88 m (6 ft 2 in)

Sport
- Sport: Gaelic football
- Position: Right Corner Forward
Clubs
- Years: Club
- Kilmacud Crokes; Donegal Boston
College
- Years: College
- UCD
Inter-county
Years	County	Apps (scores)
2013–2024	Dublin	54 (8-97)
Inter-county titles
- Leinster titles: 9
- All-Irelands: 7
- NFL: 4
- All Stars: 3

Paul Mannion (born 25 May 1993) is an Irish Gaelic footballer who plays for the Kilmacud Crokes club and formerly for the Dublin county team.

He transferred to Donegal Boston in 2022.

== Personal ==
He studied International Commerce and Chinese in UCD. As part of his studies he spent a year living in China studying Mandarin Chinese. His year spent living abroad meant that he was not part of Dublin's All-Ireland win in 2015.

== Career statistics ==
As of match played 12 May 2024

Team	Season	National League			Leinster		All-Ireland		Total	
Team	Season	Division	Apps	Score	Apps	Score	Apps	Score	Apps	Score
Dublin	2013	Division 1	6	1-19	3	2-06	3	1-00	12	4-25
Dublin	2014	Division 1	2	0-02	3	0-03	1	0-00	6	0-05
Dublin	2015	Division 1	0	0-00	0	0-00	0	0-00	0	0-00
Dublin	2016	Division 1	5	0-04	3	0-01	4	1-01	12	1-06
Dublin	2017	Division 1	6	1-03	3	0-10	3	0-07	12	1-20
Dublin	2018	Division 1	3	0-02	3	1-04	4	1-05	10	2-11
Dublin	2019	Division 1			3	0-12	5	0-16	8	0-28
Dublin	2020	Division 1			2	0-01	2	0-01	4	0-02
Dublin	2021	Division 1	DNP							
Dublin	2022	Division 1	DNP							
Dublin	2023	Division 2	2	1-01	3	1-07	6	0-13	11	2-21
Dublin	2024				3	1-10			3	1-10
Total			24	3-31	26	5-54	28	3-43	78	11-131

== Honours ==
- Leinster Minor Football Championship (1): 2011
- Leinster Under-21 Football Championship (2): 2012, 2014
- All-Ireland Under-21 Football Championship (2): 2012, 2014
- National Football League (4): 2013, 2014, 2016, 2018
- Leinster Senior Football Championship (8): 2013, 2014, 2016, 2017, 2018, 2019, 2023, 2024
- All-Ireland Senior Football Championship (7): 2013, 2016, 2017, 2018, 2019, 2020, 2023
- All Stars (3): 2017, 2018, 2019
- All-Ireland Senior Football Championship Final Man of the Match (1): 2023
- The Sunday Game Team of the Year (1): 2023
