= Conor Early =

Louth Gaelic footballer

Sport
- Sport: Gaelic football
Clubs
- Years: Club
- 2023–: Oliver Plunketts; Na Fianna
Inter-county
- Years: County
- Louth

Conor Early is an Irish Gaelic footballer who plays as a midfielder for Oliver Plunketts, Na Fianna and the Louth county team.

His native club is Oliver Plunketts. He transferred to Na Fianna in 2023. He has played for Na Fianna in the Dublin Senior Football Championship.

Early left the Louth panel ahead of the 2018 Leinster Senior Football Championship when Pete McGrath managed. But he played for Louth in the 2023 Leinster Senior Football Championship final when Mickey Harte managed. He also played for Louth in the 2024 Leinster Senior Football Championship final when Ger Brennan managed.
