= Niall Scully =

Dublin Gaelic footballer (born 1994)

Personal information
- Native name: Níall Ó Scolaí (Irish)
- Born: 19 April 1994 (age 32) Dublin, Ireland
- Occupation: Student
- Height: 1.80 m (5 ft 11 in)

Sport
- Sport: Gaelic football
- Position: Right half-forward
Club
- Years: Club
- Templeogue Synge Street
Inter-county
- Years: County
- 2017–: Dublin
Inter-county titles
- Leinster titles: 8
- All-Irelands: 5
- NFL: 1
- All Stars: 2

Niall Scully (born 19 April 1994) is a Gaelic footballer who plays for the Templeogue Synge Street club and for the Dublin county team.
