= Brian Howard (Gaelic footballer) =

Dublin Gaelic footballer

Personal information
- Born: Dublin, Ireland
- Height: 5"11

Sport
- Sport: Gaelic football
- Position: Half Forward
Club
- Years: Club
- Raheny
Inter-county
- Years: County
- 2017–: Dublin
Inter-county titles
- Leinster titles: 8
- All-Irelands: 5
- NFL: 1
- All Stars: 2

Brian Howard (born 1997) is a Gaelic footballer who plays for the Raheny club and for the Dublin county team.

== Playing career ==
2018 was the breakthrough year for Brian Howard as a senior footballer with Dublin. The Raheny clubman won an All-Star at midfield with fellow Raheny player Brian Fenton for his performances with Dublin throughout the year. He won the Leinster Senior Football Championship with Dublin against Laois at Croke Park and scored one point in Dublin's comfortable victory.
