= Lee Gannon =

Irish hurler and Gaelic footballer

Personal information
- Native name: Laoi Mag Fhionnáin (Irish)
- Born: 2000 (age 25–26) Whitehall, Dublin, Ireland
- Occupation: Student

Sport
- Sport: Football
- Position: Left wing-back
Club
- Years: Club
- Whitehall Colmcille
Club titles
- Dublin titles: 0
College
- Years: College
- 2017-2021: Dublin City University
College titles
- Fitzgibbon titles: 0
Inter-county*
Years	County	Apps (scores)
2019	Dublin	0 (0-00)
Inter-county titles
- Leinster titles: 2
- All-Irelands: 0
- NHL: 0
- All Stars: 0
- *Inter County team apps and scores correct as of 17:50, 12 July 2021.

Lee Gannon (born 2000) is an Irish hurler and Gaelic footballer who plays for Dublin Championship club Whitehall Colmcille. He has also appeared at inter-county level as a dual player with Dublin. He usually lines out as a corner back for the Dublin senior football team and Centre back for Whitehall Colmcille.

== Career ==
A member of the Whitehall Colmcille club in Dublin, Gannon first came to prominence at schools' level as captain of the combined Dublin North team that won the Leinster Colleges Championship in 2018. He made his first appearance on the inter-county scene as a member of the Dublin minor team during the 2017 Leinster Championship, before later lining out as a dual player with the Dublin under-20 teams and has won Leinster Under-20 Championship titles in both codes. Gannon joined the Dublin senior hurling team in 2019 before finding inclusion with the Dublin senior football team in 2021.

Gannon was found with MDMA at the Electric Picnic Festival in August 2024, avoiding a conviction after making a donation to a court poor box.

== Honours ==
Dublin North

- Leinster Colleges Senior Hurling Championship: 2018

Dublin

- Leinster Under-20 Hurling Championship: 2020
- Leinster Under-20 Football Championship: 2020
