= Ciarán Kilkenny =

Dublin Gaelic footballer (born 1993)

Personal information
- Native name: Ciarán Mac Giolla Chainnigh (Irish)
- Born: 7 July 1993 (age 33) Dublin, Ireland
- Occupation: Primary school teacher
- Height: 1.85 m (6 ft 1 in)

Sport
- Sport: Gaelic football
- Position: Centre forward
Club
- Years: Club
- Castleknock
Club titles
- Dublin titles: 1
- Leinster titles: 1
Inter-county*
Years	County	Apps (scores)
2012–2026	Dublin	72 (7–146)
Inter-county titles
- Leinster titles: 12
- All-Irelands: 8
- NFL: 5
- All Stars: 6
- *Inter County team apps and scores correct as of match played 29 June 2024.

Ciarán Kilkenny (born 7 July 1993) is an Irish Gaelic footballer who played for the Dublin county team and as a dual player for his club Castleknock. He was previously on the playing list of Australian rules football club Hawthorn, as a rookie.

He has featured on an advertising billboard campaign for joint problems in India.

== Early life ==
Kilkenny attended Scoil Oilibhéir in Clonsilla.

== Hurling ==
Kilkenny represented Dublin at various underage levels in hurling. Although he was previously offered a place on the Dublin senior hurling panel, he chose to focus primarily on Gaelic football. However, he continues to play hurling for his club, Castleknock.

== Football ==
=== Club ===
Kilkenny won the Dublin Minor Football Championship with Castleknock in 2011. He won the Dublin Junior Football Championship with Castleknock, his last medal before switching codes to Aussie rules.

=== Inter-county ===
==== Minor/U21 ====
Kilkenny won the 2011 Leinster Minor Football Championship and the Leinster Minor Hurling Championship with Dublin in 2011. He was on the losing side for both teams in the All-Ireland finals in 2011 at Croke Park.

Kilkenny was called up to the Dublin under 21 team in 2012. He won the Leinster Under 21 Football Championship with Dublin in March 2012. Ciaran scored a total of 1–07 in the Leinster final against Louth at Páirc Tailteann in Navan. The game finished on 1–16 to 0–08 with Dublin winning the game by a comfortable 11 point margin to become Leinster champions for the tenth time. Ciaran Kilkenny scored a total of 2-25 (0-7f) for Dublin in the Leinster Championship. Dublin went on to meet Cork in the All-Ireland semi-final at Portlaoise. Kilkenny scored just one point in a game in which Dublin won against the Munster champions. The game finished on a scoreline of 3–11 to 0–14. Ciarán won the all-Ireland under 21 championship with Dublin against Connacht champions Roscommon in Tullamore. Kilkenny scored a total of four points in a close game against Roscommon which ended with heavy scoring from Dublin. The game finished on a scoreline of 2–12 to 1–11.

Kilkenny was named the Cadbury's Hero of the Future for his performances with Dublin in 2012.

=== Senior ===
Kilkenny made his debut for the Dublin senior football team against Laois in the 2012 All-Ireland Senior Football Championship when he came on as a substitute for Diarmuid Connolly. He made his first start for the Dublin senior football team against Mayo in the 2012 All-Ireland football semi-final defeat. He scored three points in the game.

=== Move to AFL ===
Kilkenny was linked to a possible move to Australia as a rookie in the Australian AFL. Dublin football legend Dessie Farrell described the potential departure of Kilkenny to Australian football as "a huge loss".

Hawthorn confirmed the signing on 29 September 2011, after Carlton had also tried to secure the 19-year-old's services. Kilkenny flew to Melbourne to visit Hawthorn officials at Waverley, and was scheduled to become the first Irishman to play at the club. Recent changes to rookie list rules had made the recruitment of Irish players more appealing, with clubs now able to count one Irish player as an international rookie, meaning the player does not take up a main rookie spot.

After just four months and a return to Ireland for the Christmas, Kilkenny decided for personal reasons to remain in Ireland where he wished to pursue a career with Castleknock and Dublin.

=== Return to Ireland ===
Upon his return to the native soil, Kilkenny collected both the 2013 NFL title and 2013 All-Ireland Senior Football Championship title with Dublin. In March 2014, he tore his anterior cruciate ligament while fulfilling a Dublin football fixture at Croke Park against Kildare in a 2014 NFL, causing him to miss the rest of the season.

By winning his sixth All Star in 2022, he drew level with Stephen Cluxton and became the Dublin player with the joint highest number of awards.

== International rules ==
Kilkenny played twice for Ireland against Australia in the 2013 International Rules Series, and scored a goal in the second Test at Croke Park.

== Career statistics ==
As of match played 28 June 2024

Team	Year	National League			Leinster		All-Ireland		Total	
Team	Year	Division	Apps	Score	Apps	Score	Apps	Score	Apps	Score
Dublin	2012	Division 1			-		2	0-03	2	0-03
Dublin	2013	Division 1			3	0-08	3	0-03	6	0-11
Dublin	2014	Division 1			DNP due to injury					
Dublin	2015	Division 1			3	0-10	4	0-08	7	0-18
Dublin	2016	Division 1			3	0-04	4	0-01	7	0-05
Dublin	2017	Division 1			3	1-08	3	0-01	6	1-09
Dublin	2018	Division 1			3	2-15	4	0-09	7	2-24
Dublin	2019	Division 1			3	0-05	5	1-08	8	1-13
Dublin	2020	Division 1			3	1-13	2	0-07	5	1-20
Dublin	2021	Division 1			3	0-10	1	0-03	4	0-13
Dublin	2022	Division 1			3	1-06	2	0-06	5	1-12
Dublin	2023	Division 2			3	1-08	5	0-02	8	1-10
Dublin	2024	Division 1			3	0-05	4	0-03	7	0-08
Career total					33	6-92	39	1-54	72	7-146

== Honours ==
Dublin

- All-Ireland Senior Football Championship (8): 2013, 2015, 2016, 2017, 2018, 2019, 2020, 2023

Individual

- All Star (6): 2015, 2016, 2018, 2020, 2021, 2022

Awards
Preceded by Tom Flynn (Galway)	U21 Footballer of the Year; 2012	Succeeded by Ian Burke (Galway)
