= Diarmuid Connolly =

Dublin Gaelic footballer

Personal information
- Native name: Diarmuid Ó Conghaile (Irish)
- Nickname: Dermo
- Born: 7 July 1987 (age 39) Dublin, Ireland
- Occupation: National Sales Manager
- Height: 1.87m (6ft2)

Sport
- Sport: Gaelic football
- Position: Centre / Wing Forward
Club
- Years: Club
- 2005–: St Vincents
Club titles
- Dublin titles: 5
- Leinster titles: 4
- All-Ireland Titles: 2
College
- Years: College
- 2008–2010: Dublin Institute of Technology
Inter-county*
Years	County	Apps (scores)
2007–2020	Dublin	54 (12-75)
Inter-county titles
- Leinster titles: 11
- All-Irelands: 7
- NFL: 4
- All Stars: 2
- *Inter County team apps and scores correct as of 14:55, 17 July 2019.

Diarmuid Connolly (born 7 July 1987) is an Irish Gaelic footballer. His league and championship career at senior level as a forward playing for the Dublin county team initially spanned 11 seasons from 2007 until 2018 when he left the panel after appearing in a league game against Mayo in February 2018.

In July 2019, Dublin senior football manager Jim Gavin confirmed in an interview with Dubs TV that Connolly was back training with the Dublin panel for the 2019 Championship. He went on to win sixth All Ireland title in September 2019.

In October 2020, Connolly announced his retirement from inter-county football.

== Early life ==
Born in Dublin, Connolly inherited a passion for sport from his Kilkenny-born father and County Clare-born mother. He was educated at his secondary school Ardscoil Rís where he played competitive Gaelic football and hurling, and attended Scoil Mhuire Marino for Primary School while he also played soccer with Belvedere F.C. and Home Farm F.C.

== Career ==
Connolly first came to prominence as a Gaelic footballer and hurler at juvenile and underage levels with St Vincents. He made his debut with the club's senior team in 2004. Since then Connolly has two All-Ireland Club Football medals. He has also won four Leinster medals and four county championship medals. Diarmuid has won 6 All-Irelands.

Connolly made his debut on the inter-county scene when he was selected for the Dublin minor team in 2005. After an unsuccessful minor tenure, he later joined the Dublin under-21 teams as a dual player and won a Leinster medal as a hurler. Connolly made his senior debut during the 2007 O'Byrne Cup. He won five All-Ireland medals, beginning with lone triumphs in 2011 and 2013, and followed by three successive championships from 2015 to 2017. Connolly also won ten Leinster medals and four National League medals. He received two All Star awards in 2014 and 2016.

In June 2017, Connolly received a 12-week ban after physical interference with linesman Ciaran Branagan during Dublin's win against Carlow in the quarter-final of the 2017 Leinster Senior Football Championship.

In March 2018, Connolly left the Dublin senior football panel to spend the summer in Boston playing for Donegal Boston. He subsequently won the championship with the Boston club.

In July 2019, Dublin senior football manager Jim Gavin confirmed in an interview with Dubs TV that Diarmuid Connolly was back training with the Dublin panel for the 2019 championship season.

== Personal life ==
Connolly pleaded guilty to assault causing harm during an unprovoked attack at a pub in Phibsborough on 6 August 2012. The victim, Anthony Kelly, suffered a fractured eye socket as a result of Connolly's assault. In October 2014, District Court Judge Patrick Clyne dismissed the case "because Connolly had done all that had been asked of him through a series of restorative justice measures".

Connolly again pleaded guilty to assault after paying €2,000 compensation to two men who were punched by him in what was described as an unprovoked attack on New Year's Eve in 2022. The court was told that Connolly had punched two men and dragged one of them along the ground in an "unprovoked" attack

== Peil Star film ==
In 2016, Diarmuid Connolly appeared in a Street Gaelic Football film created by Peil Star with Dublin teammate Shane Carthy and New York footballer C. J. Molloy. In the video, Connolly kicks a Gaelic football across the River Liffey in Dublin.

== Career statistics ==
As of rejoining Dublin GAA Senior Football panel 14 July 2019.

Team	Season	National League			Leinster		All-Ireland		Total	
Team	Season	Division	Apps	Score	Apps	Score	Apps	Score	Apps	Score
Dublin	2007	Division 1A	6	1-06	3	0-00	2	0-04	11	1-10
Dublin	2008	Division 2	3	1-06	2	1-05	1	0-00	6	2-11
Dublin	2009	Division 1	5	0-10	3	0-01	1	0-00	9	0-11
Dublin	2010	Division 1	1	0-00	0	0-00	0	0-00	1	0-00
Dublin	2011	Division 1	8	4-11	3	1-03	3	0-07	14	5-21
Dublin	2012	Division 1	7	4-21	2	1-04	2	0-02	11	5-27
Dublin	2013	Division 1	8	1-20	3	1-04	3	0-05	14	2-29
Dublin	2014	Division 1	5	2-11	3	1-04	2	1-07	10	4-22
Dublin	2015	Division 1	5	1-05	3	3-06	4	1-04	12	5-15
Dublin	2016	Division 1	6	3-05	3	1-09	4	1-07	13	5-21
Dublin	2017	Division 1	3	0-02	1	0-01	2	0-01	6	0-04
Dublin	2018	Division 1	0	0-00	0	0-00	0	0-00	0	0-00
Dublin	2019	Division 1	0	0-00	0	0-00	2	0-00	2	0-09
Total			57	17-97	26	9-37	26	3-37	107	29-171

== Honours ==
St Vincents

- Dublin Senior Football Championship (5): 2007, 2013, 2014, 2016, 2017
- Leinster Senior Club Football Championship (4): 2007, 2013, 2014, 2016
- All-Ireland Senior Club Football Championship (2): 2008, 2014

Dublin

- All-Ireland Senior Football Championship (6): 2011, 2013, 2015, 2016, 2017, 2019
- Leinster Senior Football Championship (10): 2007, 2008, 2009, 2011, 2012, 2013, 2014, 2015, 2016, 2017
- National Football League (4): 2013, 2014, 2015, 2016
- O'Byrne Cup (4): 2007, 2008, 2015, 2017
- Leinster Under-21 Hurling Championship (1): 2007

Individual

- GAA GPA All-Star Award (2): 2014, 2016
