= 1998 O'Byrne Cup =

Gaelic football competition, Leinster, Ireland

Tournament details
- Province: Leinster
- Year: 1998
- Trophy: O'Byrne Cup
- Date: 4 January — 22 March
- Teams: 12

Winners
- Champions: Offaly (6th win)
- Manager: Tommy Lyons
- Captain: Peter Brady

Runners-up
- Runners-up: Louth
- Manager: Paddy Clarke
- Captain: Gareth O'Neill

Other
- Matches played: 12

The 1998 O'Byrne Cup was a Gaelic football competition played by the county teams of Leinster GAA.

The tournament was a straight knockout, with 12 teams. New rules were tested:

- players were cautioned for any pushing, pulling or holding of an opponent
- two referees (in some games)
- five substitutes
- picking the ball off the ground permitted, so long as the player's feet are on the ground
- "mark" or free kick for an overhead catch from a kick-out
- solo run limited to one hop or one "solo"

Offaly were the winners, scoring two late goals to defeat Louth in the final at Gaelic Grounds in Drogheda.

== Results ==
First round 4/10/11 January 1998
Wicklow (replayed) | 0-9; 3-4
Meath | 0-9; 0-12
Westmeath | 1-21
Kilkenny | 0-4
Kildare | 1-8
Louth | 1-11
Dublin | 0-11
Longford | 0-6

Quarter-finals; 18/25 January 1998
Carlow | 1-7
Wicklow | 2-11
Offaly | 0-9
Westmeath | 0-6
Wexford | 0-11
Louth | 2-6
Laois | 0-6
Dublin | 1-17

Semi-finals; 31 Jan / 8 Feb 1998
Wicklow | 1-5
Offaly | 0-13
Louth (AET) | 0-17
Dublin | 0-14

Final; 22 March 1998
Offaly | 4-7
Louth | 2-7

=== Final ===
| 22 March 1998 | Offaly | 1-16 - 1-10 | Louth | Gaelic Grounds, Drogheda |
| | C. McManus 2-1 (2 pens, 1'45), V. Claffey 0-5 (2f), K. Kellaghan, B. Mooney 1-0 each, P. Brady 0-1 | | C. O'Hanlon 1-1, G. O'Neill 1-0, A. Doherty 0-3, M. Farrelly 0-2, G. Curran 0-1 | Referee: E. Murtagh/P. O'Toole (Longford) |

| GK | 1 | Ken Furlong (Tullamore) |
| RCB | 2 | Cathal Daly (Tullamore) |
| FB | 3 | Barry Malone (Rhode) |
| LCB | 4 | David Foley (Ballyfore) |
| RHB | 5 | John Kenny (Daingean) |
| CHB | 6 | Paul Mulvihill (Killeigh/Raheen) |
| LHB | 7 | James Brady (Gracefield) |
| MF | 8 | Ciarán McManus (Tubber) |
| MF | 9 | James Grennan (Ferbane) |
| RHF | 10 | Colm Quinn (Ballycumber) |
| CHF | 11 | Mark Daly (Clara) |
| LHF | 12 | Ronan Mooney (Shamrocks) |
| RCF | 13 | Vinny Claffey (Doon) |
| FF | 14 | Barry Mooney (Shamrocks) |
| LCF | 15 | Peter Brady (Edenderry) (c) |
Substitutes:
| | 16 | Ken Kellaghan (Rhode) for M. Daly |
| | 17 | Roy Malone (Rhode) for B. Mooney |

| GK | 1 | Niall O'Donnell (Clan na Gael) |
| RCB | 2 | Breen Phillips (Newtown Blues) |
| FB | 3 | Gareth O'Neill (Simonstown Gaels, Meath) (c) |
| LCB | 4 | Nicky Malone (Lann Léire) |
| RHB | 5 | Declan O'Sullivan (St Joseph's) |
| CHB | 6 | Ciarán Nash (Roche Emmets) |
| LHB | 7 | Aaron Hoey (St Bride's) |
| MF | 8 | Ken Reilly (Stabannon Parnells) |
| MF | 9 | Gerry Curran (Clan na Gael) |
| RHF | 10 | Christy Grimes (Mattock Rangers) |
| CHF | 11 | Stephen Melia (St Joseph's) |
| LHF | 12 | Martin Farrelly (Lann Léire) |
| RCF | 13 | Alan Doherty (St Mary's) |
| FF | 14 | Ollie McDonnell (St Joseph's) |
| LCF | 15 | Pat Butterly (Stabannon Parnells) |
Substitutes:
| | 16 | Cathal O'Hanlon (Clan na Gael) for McDonnell |
| | 17 | John Moroney (Oliver Plunketts) for Butterly |
| | 18 | Mark Stanfield (O'Connells) for Farrelly |
| | 19 | Jeffrey Finnegan (Oliver Plunketts) for Hoey |
| | 20 | Martin Harvey (Dundalk Gaels) for Curran |
