= 2022 O'Byrne Cup =

Gaelic football tournament

Tournament details
- Province: Leinster
- Year: 2022
- Trophy: O'Byrne Cup
- Date: 8–22 January 2022
- Teams: 11
- Defending champions: Longford

Winners
- Champions: Dublin (10th win)
- Manager: Dessie Farrell
- Captain: Ciarán Kilkenny

Runners-up
- Runners-up: Laois
- Manager: Billy Sheehan
- Captain: Kieran Lillis

Other
- Matches played: 15

The 2022 O'Byrne Cup was a Gaelic football tournament played by eleven county teams of Leinster GAA in January 2022; Kilkenny did not take part. Longford were the holders.

A new rule limits the number of substitutions a team can make; players taken off cannot return, capping the number of changes at 11.

Dublin were the winners.

The opening round game between Meath and Wicklow was called off, with Wicklow infected by COVID-19.

Also Carlow vs Westmeath game was cancelled for the same reason.

== Competition format ==
The eleven teams are drawn to play in two groups of four teams and one group of three teams.

Each team plays the other teams in their group once. Two points are awarded for a win and one for a draw.

The three group winners advance to the knockout stage, with one of the winners of a four-team group playing the winners of the three-team group in the semi-final, and the other four-team-group winners advancing directly to the final. Drawn games are decided by penalty shoot-out without any extra time being played.

== Group stage ==
Games took place 8–15 January 2022.

=== Group A ===
| Pos | Team | Pld | W | D | L | PF | PA | PD | Pts | Qualification |
|---|---|---|---|---|---|---|---|---|---|---|
| 1 | Dublin | 3 | 3 | 0 | 0 | 74 | 39 | +35 | 6 | Advance to final |
| 2 | Offaly | 3 | 2 | 0 | 1 | 51 | 54 | −3 | 4 | |
| 3 | Longford | 3 | 1 | 0 | 2 | 53 | 52 | +1 | 2 | |
| 4 | Louth | 3 | 0 | 0 | 3 | 40 | 73 | −33 | 0 | |

Updated to match(es) played on 15 January 2022. Source: Leinster GAA

=== Group B ===
| Pos | Team | Pld | W | D | L | PF | PA | PD | Pts | Qualification |
|---|---|---|---|---|---|---|---|---|---|---|
| 1 | Laois | 3 | 2 | 0 | 1 | 48 | 51 | −3 | 4 | Advance to semi-final |
| 2 | Meath | 3 | 2 | 0 | 1 | 27 | 28 | −1 | 4 | |
| 3 | Wicklow | 3 | 1 | 0 | 2 | 28 | 30 | −2 | 2 | |
| 4 | Wexford | 3 | 1 | 0 | 2 | 51 | 45 | +6 | 2 | |

Updated to match(es) played on 15 January 2022. Source:
- Meath received a walkover from Wicklow.
- Since Meath and Laois finished on the same number of points, head to head was used as the tiebreaker.

=== Group C ===
| Pos | Team | Pld | W | D | L | PF | PA | PD | Pts | Qualification |
|---|---|---|---|---|---|---|---|---|---|---|
| 1 | Kildare | 2 | 2 | 0 | 0 | 50 | 21 | +29 | 4 | Advance to semi-final |
| 2 | Westmeath | 1 | 0 | 0 | 1 | 8 | 19 | −11 | 0 | |
| 3 | Carlow | 1 | 0 | 0 | 1 | 13 | 31 | −18 | 0 | |

Updated to match(es) played on 13 January 2022. Source: Leinster GAA
- Carlow v. Westmeath was not played.

== Knockout stage ==
19 January 2022
19:45 GMT (UTC±0)
Semi-Final

Report

| Laois | 0-09 (9) – (9) 1-06 (6–5 pen) | Kildare |
|---|---|---|
(HT: 0-05 – 1-03)
Penalty kicks
| Mark Barry; Gary Walsh; Sean Moore; Cormac Murphy; Brian Daly; Gary Walsh; Mark Barry; Sean Moore; Brian Daly; Cormac Murphy | | Paddy Woodgate; Mark Donnellan; Paul Cribbin; Daniel Flynn; Jimmy Hyland; Jimmy Hyland; Paddy Woodgate; Paul Cribbin; Mark Donnellan; Daniel Flynn |

Dr. Cullen Park, Carlow
Referee: David Hickey (Carlow)

TG4

22 January 2022
15:00 GMT (UTC±0)
Final

Report

| Laois | 0-11 (11) – (16) 1-13 | Dublin |
|---|---|---|
(HT: 0-06 – 1-05)

Dr. Cullen Park, Carlow
Referee: Cormac Reilly (Meath)
