= 2020 O'Byrne Cup =

Gaelic football tournament

Tournament details
- Province: Leinster
- Year: 2020
- Trophy: O'Byrne Cup

Winners
- Champions: Longford (3rd win)
- Manager: Padraic Davis
- Captain: Michael Quinn

Runners-up
- Runners-up: Offaly
- Manager: John Maughan
- Captain: Eoin Rigney

Other
- Matches played: 18

The 2020 O'Byrne Cup was a Gaelic football tournament played by county teams of Leinster GAA in December 2019 and January 2020.

Longford were the surprise winners.

== Competition format ==
One team (Dublin) receives a bye to the semi-finals. The remaining ten teams are drawn to play in one group of four teams and two groups of three teams.

In the four-team group, each team plays the other teams in their group once. Two points are awarded for a win and one for a draw.

In the two three-team groups, each team plays the other teams in their group once. Each team also plays one game against a team from the other three-team group. Two points are awarded for a win and one for a draw.

The three group winners advance to the semi-finals.

== Group stage ==
=== Group 1 ===
Pos	Team	Pld	W	D	L	PF	PA	PD	Pts	Qualification
1	Longford	3	2	0	1	50	39	+11	4	Advance to semi-final
2	Kildare	3	2	0	1	47	43	+4	4	
3	Carlow	3	1	0	2	31	37	−6	2	
4	Wicklow	3	1	0	2	36	45	−9	2	

Updated to match(es) played on 4 January 2020. Source: Leinster GAA
- Longford are ranked ahead of Kildare as they won the head-to-head match between the teams
- Carlow are ranked ahead of Wicklow as they won the head-to-head match between the teams

7 December 2019 Round 1	Kildare	0-14 (14) – (20) 2-14	Longford	Newbridge
14:00 GMT (UTC±0)				Venue: St. Conleth's Park
		Report		Referee: Chris Dwyer (Offaly)

7 December 2019 Round 1	Carlow	2-05 (11) – (8) 0-08	Wicklow	Carlow
14:00 GMT (UTC±0)				Venue: Dr Cullen Park
		Report

14 December 2019 Round 2	Wicklow	2-07 (13) – (20) 2-14	Kildare	Aughrim
14:00 GMT (UTC±0)				Venue: Aughrim County Ground
		Report		Referee: Dan Stynes (Dublin)

15 December 2019 Round 2	Longford	1-13 (16) – (10) 0-10	Carlow	Longford
14:00 GMT (UTC±0)				Venue: Pearse Park
		Report		Referee: Ciarán Reilly (Dublin)

4 January 2020 Round 3	Wicklow	2-09 (15) – (14) 0-14	Longford	Aughrim
14:00 GMT (UTC±0)				Venue: Aughrim County Ground
		Report		Referee: David Hickey

4 January 2020 Round 3	Carlow	0-10 (10) – (13) 1-10	Kildare	Carlow
14:00 GMT (UTC±0)				Venue: IT Carlow
		Report		Referee: Barry Tiernan

=== Three-team groups ===
==== Group 2 ====
Pos	Team	Pld	W	D	L	PF	PA	PD	Pts	Qualification
1	Offaly	3	3	0	0	57	41	+16	6	Advance to semi-final
2	Laois	3	1	0	2	51	62	−11	2	
3	Wexford	3	0	0	3	35	47	−12	0	

Updated to match(es) played on 4 January 2020. Source: Leinster GAA

7 December 2019 Round 1	Laois	2-12 (18) – (20) 1-17	Offaly	Portarlington
14:00 GMT (UTC±0)				Venue: McCann Park
		Report		Referee: Niall Ward (Westmeath)

14 December 2019 Round 2	Wexford	1-11 (14) – (15) 1-12	Laois	Enniscorthy
14:00 GMT (UTC±0)				Venue: St Patrick's Park
		Report		Referee: Lee Moore (Kildare)

4 January 2020 Round 3	Offaly	2-12 (18) – (10) 1-07	Wexford	Kilcormac
14:00 GMT (UTC±0)				Venue: Faithful Fields
		Report		Referee: Seamus Mulhare

==== Group 3 ====
Pos	Team	Pld	W	D	L	PF	PA	PD	Pts	Qualification
1	Westmeath	3	2	1	0	46	38	+8	5	Advance to semi-final
2	Meath	3	1	1	1	54	44	+10	3	
3	Louth	3	1	0	2	36	47	−11	2	

Updated to match(es) played on 4 January 2020. Source: Leinster GAA

8 December 2019 Round 1	Meath	0-10 (10) – (12) 1-09	Louth	Navan
14:00 GMT (UTC±0)				Venue: Páirc Tailteann
		Report		Referee: Gary Hurley (Westmeath)

14 December 2019 Round 2	Westmeath	1-13 (16) – (16) 1-13	Meath	Mullingar
14:00 GMT (UTC±0)				Venue: Lakepoint Park
		Report		Referee: Fintan Pierce (Offaly)

4 January 2020 Round 3	Louth	0-11 (11) – (16) 1-13	Westmeath	Drogheda
14:00 GMT (UTC±0)				Venue: Drogheda Park
		Report		Referee: Shay Farrelly

==== Cross-group games ====
The three teams in Group 2 play the three teams in Group 3 with each team having a single game.

8 December 2019 Round 1	Wexford	0-11 (11) – (14) 1-11	Westmeath	Enniscorthy
14:00 GMT (UTC±0)				Venue: St Patrick's Park
		Report

14 December 2019 Round 2	Louth	1-10 (13) – (19) 1-16	Offaly	Drogheda
14:00 GMT (UTC±0)				Venue: Drogheda Park
		Report		Referee: Keith O'Brien (Westmeath)

4 January 2020 Round 3	Meath	4-16 (28) – (18) 1-15	Laois	Navan
14:00 GMT (UTC±0)				Venue: Páirc Tailteann
		Report		Referee: Patrick Maguire

== Knockout stage ==
=== Semi-finals ===
The three group winners plus the team given a bye (Dublin) compete in the semi-finals. The two winners advance to the final.

11 January 2020
14:00 GMT (UTC±0)
Semi-Final

Report

Longford	1-13 (16) – (15) 3-06	Dublin
(HT: 0-06 – 1-03)

Pearse Park, Longford
Referee: A Coyne (Westmeath)

11 January 2020
14:00 GMT (UTC±0)
Semi-Final

Report

Offaly	0-16 (16) – (11) 0-11	Westmeath
(HT: 0-08 – 0-07)

O'Connor Park, Tullamore
Referee: David Fedigan (Louth)

=== Final ===
18 January 2020
14:45 GMT (UTC±0)
Final

Report

Offaly	0-11 (11) – (15) 1-12	Longford
(HT: 0-06 – 1-03)
Pts: Bernard Allen 5 (2f), Anton Sullivan 3, Shane Horan 2, Aaron Leavy 1		Gls: Michael Quinn 1 Pts: Dessie Reynolds 2, Rian Brady 2(fs), Oran Kenny 2, Darren Gallagher 2 (1f), Darragh Doherty 2, Michael Quinn 1, Peter Lynn 1

O'Connor Park, Tullamore
Referee: Seamus Mulhare (Laois)
