= 2000 O'Byrne Cup =

Gaelic football competition, Leinster, Ireland

Tournament details
- Province: Leinster
- Year: 2000
- Trophy: O'Byrne Cup

Winners
- Champions: Longford (2nd win)
- Manager: Michael McCormack
- Captain: Enda Barden

Runners-up
- Runners-up: Westmeath
- Manager: Brendan Lowry
- Captain: Martin Flanagan

The 2000 O'Byrne Cup was a Gaelic football competition played by the county teams of Leinster GAA.

The tournament was a straight knockout, with 12 teams.

Longford were the winners, defeating Westmeath in the final in Cusack Park, Mullingar. In the final, the Westmeath manager, Brendan Lowry, intruded onto the pitch and clashed with a Longford player and the referee; he received a six-month suspension. The suspension was later lifted.

== Results ==
First round 9 January 2000
Longford	3-12
Kildare	0-13
Wicklow	2-7
Carlow	2-13
Wexford	2-15
Kilkenny	1-8
Westmeath	2-19
Louth	3-10

Quarter-finals; 16 January 2000
Longford	0-20
Dublin	1-16
Carlow	1-12
Offaly	3-7
Laois	1-16
Wexford	1-9
Meath	3-7
Westmeath	2-12

Semi-finals; 23 January 2000
Longford	0-14
Offaly	0-12
Laois	1-8
Westmeath	1-10

Final; 6 February 2000
Longford	2-6
Westmeath	0-7
