= Frank Lynch (Gaelic footballer) =

Irish Gaelic games player, manager and administrator

Personal information
- Native name: Proinsias Ó Loingsigh (Irish)
- Born: 1938 (age 87–88) Haggardstown, County Louth, Ireland
- Occupation: Accountant

Sport
- Sport: Gaelic football
- Position: Left wing-forward
Club
- Years: Club
- Geraldines
Club titles
- Louth titles: 0 (Runner-Up 1969)
Inter-county
- Years: County
- 1956–1970: Louth
Inter-county titles
- Leinster titles: 1
- All-Irelands: 1
- NFL: 0

Frank Lynch (born 1938) is an Irish Gaelic games administrator, Gaelic football manager and former player. His league and championship career with the Louth senior team lasted fourteen seasons from 1956 until 1970.

Born in Haggardstown, County Louth, Lynch was educated at St. Mary's College in Dundalk. At school he was a promising exponent of rugby union and captained the team before being selected to play for Leinster at youths level. Lynch later joined the Geraldines club with whom he won a county junior championship medal in 1966.

After being excluded from the Louth minor because of his rugby exploits, Lynch subsequently joined the senior team and made his debut during the 1956–57 league. Over the following fourteen seasons Lynch had some success, culminating with the winning of a set of All-Ireland and Leinster medals in his debut season. He played his last game for Louth in June 1970.

As a member of the Leinster inter-provincial team on a number of occasions, Lynch won back-to-back Railway Cup medals in 1961 and 1962.

In retirement from playing, Lynch remained involved as an administrator and coach. He served as chairman of both the Louth County Board and the GAA's National Coaching Council. Lynch had two spells as manager of the Louth senior team, winning the O'Byrne Cup twice, an NFL Division 3 title and reaching the Leinster Championship semi-finals in 1991.

== Playing Honours ==
Geraldines

- Louth Junior Football Championship (1): 1966
- Louth Junior A Football League (3): 1957, 1958, 1961

Louth

- All-Ireland Senior Football Championship (1): 1957
- Leinster Senior Football Championship (1): 1957
- O'Byrne Cup (1): 1963
- Cú Chulainn Award (1): 1964

Leinster

- Railway Cup (2): 1961, 1962

== Managerial Honours ==
Louth

- National Football League Division 3 (1): 1987–88
- O'Byrne Cup (2): 1980, 1990
- Leinster Under-21 Football Championship (3): 1970, 1978, 1981

Sporting positions
Preceded by Liam Leech	Louth Senior Football Captain; 1968	Succeeded by Michael Rice

Preceded by Nicky Marry	Louth County Board Chairman; 1977-79	Succeeded by Paddy Kenny

Preceded by Management committee	Louth Senior Football Manager; 1980–1982	Succeeded by Jimmy Mulroy

Preceded by Mickey Whelan	Louth Senior Football Manager; 1987–1991	Succeeded by Declan Smyth
