= Offaly county football team =

Gaelic football team

Offaly
- Sport: Football
- Irish: Uíbh Fhailí
- Nickname(s): The Faithful County
- County board: Offaly GAA
- Manager: Declan Kelly and Mickey Harte
- Captain: Lee Pearson
- Home venue(s): O'Connor Park, Tullamore

Recent competitive record
- Current All-Ireland status: Leinster (QF) in 2025
- Last championship title: 1982
- Current NFL Division: 3 (2nd in 2025; promoted to Division 2)
- Last league title: 1998
First colours	Second colours

The Offaly county football team represents Offaly in men's Gaelic football and is governed by Offaly GAA, the county board of the Gaelic Athletic Association. The team competes in the three major annual inter-county competitions; the All-Ireland Senior Football Championship, the Leinster Senior Football Championship and the National Football League.

Offaly's home ground is O'Connor Park, Tullamore. The team's managers are Declan Kelly and Mickey Harte.

The team last won the Leinster Senior Championship in 1997, the All-Ireland Senior Championship in 1982 and the National League in 1998.

== History ==
Perhaps the most famous moment in football history came in the 1982 All-Ireland Senior Football Championship final when Offaly played Kerry. The match was a repeat of the previous year's final; however, not only that but a win for Kerry would give them an unprecedented fifth consecutive All-Ireland SFC title. Kerry were winning by two points with two minutes to go when Séamus Darby came on as a substitute and scored one of the most famous goals of all time in football. Kerry fumbled the counterattack which allowed Offaly to win by one single point with a score of 1–15 to 0–17.

Offaly manager Liam Kearns died suddenly in the middle of the 2023 National League campaign. Ahead of the first league game since his death (against Tipperary, another team that Kearns had managed) a moment of silence took place, with Offaly winning the game.

The Offaly vocational schools' team have made it to six All-Ireland finals but lost all six, including the first final when they were beaten by the Cork City team in 1961.

== Support ==
Professional golfer Shane Lowry said in 2021: "But any time I get the chance to go to O'Connor Park and watch Offaly play, I do and I am the first to give out if they lose and I am sitting in the stand."

== Panel ==
Team as per Offaly vs Longford in the NFL Division 3 Round 5, 5 March 2023

No.	Player	Position	Club
1	Paddy Duncan	Goalkeeper	Shamrocks
2	Lee Pearson (c)	Right corner-back	Edenderry
23	Kyle Higgins	Full-back	Ferbane
4	Rory Egan	Left corner-back	Edenderry
5	Aidan Bracken	Right half-back	Ballycommon
6	Jordan Hayes	Centre-back	Edenderry
7	Cormac Egan	Left half-back	Tullamore
8	Jack McEvoy	Midfield	Clonbullogue
9	Cillian Bourke	Midfield	Tullamore
10	John Furlong	Right half-forward	Tullamore
11	Cathal Flynn	Centre-forward	Tullamore
12	Keith O'Neill	Left half-forward	Clonbullogue
13	Dylan Hyland	Right corner-forward	Raheen
14	Jack Bryant	Full-forward	Shamrocks
15	Shane Tierney	Left corner-forward	Daingean

No.	Player	Position	Club
16	Sean O'Toole	Goalkeeper	Shamrocks
17	Shane O'Toole Greene	Substitute	Shamrocks
18	Marcus Dalaton	Substitute	Clara
19	Cathal Donoghue	Substitute	Oughterard (Galway)
20	Nigel Dunne^{RET}	Substitute	Shamrocks
21	Diarmuid Finneran	Substitute	Ballinagar
22	Robbie Gallagher	Substitute	Ballinagar
3	Aaron Kellaghan	Substitute	Rhode
24	Daire McDaid	Substitute	Tullamore
25	Kevin McDermott	Substitute	Durrow
26	Eoin Sawyer	Substitute	Castleknock (Dublin)

^{INJ} Player has had an injury which has affected recent involvement with the county team.
^{RET} Player has since retired from the county team.
^{WD} Player has since withdrawn from the county team due to a non-injury issue.

== Management team ==
- Manager: Mickey Harte
- Selectors: Martin Murphy, John Rouse
- Coach: Alan Flynn
- Backroom: Brendan Egan, Paul Fitzgerald
- Strength and conditioning coach: Keith Carr

== Managerial history ==
Offaly have a history of appointing "foreign" managers, doing so on several occasions since taking Eugene McGee from Longford in late 1976. Emmet McDonnell became the tenth foreigner to manage the team when he was appointed in 2012. Only Tommy Lyons was a successful appointment though; Lyons led Offaly to the 1997 Leinster SFC (a first in 15 years) and then to a first National Football League Division 1 title the following year. According to Colm Keys, writing in the Irish Independent after the Offaly County Board sacked Stephen Wallace in May 2018: "In the quest for perfection, Offaly have repeatedly left themselves in a right old mess when it has come to choosing and retaining managers... No county has experienced such managerial upheaval as Offaly since the turn of the century".

Key
*	Interim manager

Dates	Name	Origin	Honours
1969	Tom Scully	Aharney? Tullamore?	1969 Leinster Senior Football Championship
1970	Alo Kelly	?	—N/a
1970–197?	Alo Kelly & Tom Gilhooley	?	—N/a
1976–1984	Eugene McGee		1980 Leinster Senior Football Championship, 1981 Leinster Senior Football Championship, 1982 Leinster Senior Football Championship, 1982 All-Ireland Senior Football Championship
1984–1986	John Courtney		—N/a
1986–1987	Greg Hughes	?	—N/a
1988–1989	Michael McBrierty		—N/a
1989–1990	Jody Gunning	?	—N/a
1990–1992	Brendan Hackett		—N/a
1992–1993	Pat Fitzgerald	?	—N/a
1994–1994	Eugene Mulligan, Eamon Mulhall & Kevin Gavin	?	—N/a
1996–1999	Tommy Lyons		1997 Leinster Senior Football Championship, 1997–98 National Football League
1999–2002	Pádraig Nolan		—N/a
2002–2003	Paul O'Kelly	Edenderry	—N/a
2003–2004	Gerry Fahy		—N/a
2004–2006	Kevin Kilmurray	Daingean	—N/a
2006–2008	Pat Roe		—N/a
2008–2009	Richie Connor	Walsh Island	—N/a
2009	Tom Coffey, Vinny Claffey & Phil O'Reilly	?	—N/a
2009–2011	Tom Cribbin		—N/a
2011–2012	Gerry Cooney	Meath? Or Tullamore?	—N/a
2012	Tom Coffey^{*} (2)	?	—N/a
2012–2014	Emmet McDonnell		—N/a
2014–2017	Pat Flanagan	Clara?	2015 NFL Division 4
2017–2018	Stephen Wallace		—N/a
2018	Paul Rouse^{*}	?	—N/a
2018–2022	John Maughan		—N/a
2022–2023	Liam Kearns		—N/a
2023	Martin Murphy^{*}	Gracefield	—N/a
2023–	Declan Kelly	?	
2024–	Mickey Harte		

== Players ==
=== Records ===
- Tony McTague is the team's top scorer in National Football League history, finishing his career with 9–360 (387) in that competition.
- Cillian O'Connor of Mayo became the highest scoring player in the All-Ireland Senior Football Championship, surpassing the record of Kerry's Colm Cooper, a feat O'Connor achieved against Kerry during a defeat in Killarney in 2019. He had done this by scoring in all of his previous 51 previous championship matches prior to the record breaking match, except for one game against London in 2013 when he had been black carded, a rate of scoring in the competition only previously seen from Offaly's Matt Connor.

==== Most appearances ====
- The following are among those to have made the highest number of appearances for the senior team:

#	Name	Career	Apps
1	Martin Furlong	1966-1985	176
2	Niall McNamee	2003–2022	163
3	Ciaran McManus	1995-2011	160
4	Vinny Claffey	1986-2003	132
5	Anton Sullivan	2010-2024	128

== Colours and crest ==
=== Kit evolution ===
Before the beginning of the 2024 season Offaly revealed a new home jersey, which featured a crew neck with ribbing and the inscription Eslo Fidelis (Latin for "Be Faithful") on its lower back.

=== Team sponsorship ===
The food company Carroll's of Tullamore has sponsored Offaly since the GAA first permitted shirt sponsorship deals in 1991. It is thus the sport's longest running shirt sponsor.

Professional golfer Shane Lowry and Offaly announced a five-year partnership in April 2021.

Period	Kit manufacturer	Shirt sponsor
1991–		Carroll's of Tullamore

== Honours ==
=== National ===
- All-Ireland Senior Football Championship
  - (gold) Winners (3): 1971, 1972, 1982
  - (silver) Runners-up (3): 1961, 1969, 1981
- National Football League
  - (gold) Winners (1): 1997–98
  - (silver) Runners-up (2): 1968–69, 1972–73
- National Football League Division 3
  - (gold) Winners (1): 2025
- National Football League Division 4
  - (gold) Winners (1): 2015
- All-Ireland Under-21 Football Championship
  - (gold) Winners (1): 1988
  - (silver) Runners-up (2): 1968, 1986
- All-Ireland Under-20 Football Championship
  - (gold) Winners (1): 2021
- All-Ireland Minor Football Championship
  - (gold) Winners (1): 1964
  - (silver) Runners-up (1): 1989

=== Provincial ===
- Leinster Senior Football Championship
  - (gold) Winners (10): 1960, 1961, 1969, 1971, 1972, 1973, 1980, 1981, 1982, 1997
  - (silver) Runners-up (9): 1907, 1945, 1954, 1962, 1967, 1970, 1979, 1983, 2006
- O'Byrne Cup
  - (gold) Winners (6): 1954, 1961, 1981, 1993, 1997, 1998
- Leinster Junior Football Championship
  - (gold) Winners (4): 1935, 1972, 1998, 2001
- Leinster Under-21 Football Championship
  - (gold) Winners (8): 1968, 1971, 1973, 1977, 1979, 1986, 1988, 1995
  - (silver) Runners-up (7): 1964, 1965, 1970, 1972, 1978, 2007, 2017
- Leinster Under-20 Football Championship
  - (gold) Winners (1): 2021
- Leinster Minor Football Championship
  - (gold) Winners (7): 1947, 1960, 1962, 1964, 1965, 1989, 2025
  - (silver) Runners-up (13): 1948, 1957, 1959, 1961, 1966, 1976, 1985, 2001, 2005, 2006, 2008, 2010, 2020
