= 1970 O'Byrne Cup =

Gaelic football competition, Leinster, Ireland

Tournament details
- Province: Leinster
- Year: 1970
- Trophy: O'Byrne Cup
- Date: 3 May 1970 — 12 March 1972
- Teams: 12

Winners
- Champions: Kildare (3rd win)
- Captain: Pat Mangan

Runners-up
- Runners-up: Louth
- Captain: Peadar McParland

The 1970 O'Byrne Cup was a Gaelic football tournament contested by the county teams of Leinster GAA. It was the first staging of the O'Byrne Cup competition.

Kildare won the delayed tournament after defeating Louth in the final, played at the Gaelic Grounds in Drogheda on 12 March 1972.

== Format ==
The tournament was contested on a knockout basis. First-round byes were awarded to Kildare, Longford, Offaly and Wicklow.

== Results ==
=== First Round ===
3 May 1970	Wexford	2-09 - 1-07	Carlow	St Enda's Park, Gorey

31 May 1970	Westmeath	0-13 - 1-11	Dublin	Cusack Park, Mullingar

11 October 1970	Kilkenny	0-06 - 2-08	Laois	Nowlan Park, Kilkenny

31 January 1971	Louth	1-09 - 0-10	Meath	Gaelic Grounds, Drogheda

=== Quarter-Finals ===
10 January 1971	Kildare	1-11 - 1-08	Dublin	St Conleth's Park, Newbridge

24 January 1971	Offaly	0-15 - 3-04	Laois	O'Connor Park, Tullamore

24 January 1971	Wicklow	2-05 - 0-09	Wexford	Pearse Park, Arklow

28 February 1971	Louth	2-04 - 0-08	Longford	Gaelic Grounds, Drogheda

=== Semi-Finals ===
16 January 1972	Louth	3-13 - 0-04	Wicklow	Gaelic Grounds, Drogheda

16 January 1972	Offaly	0-09 - 2-05	Kildare	O'Connor Park, Tullamore

=== Final ===
12 March 1972	Kildare	2-08 - 0-08	Louth	Gaelic Grounds, Drogheda
	K. Kelly 1-2, H. Hyland 1-1, T. Carew, P. Kelly 0-2 each, E O'Donoghue 0-1		J. Mulroy, G. Sheridan 0-2 each, D. Drumgoole, B. Gaughran, E. McGeough, P. McParland 0-1 each	Referee: D. Guerin (Dublin)

GK	1	Mick Moore (Carbury)
RCB	2	Joe McTeague (Ballyteague)
FB	3	Denis Dalton (Sallins)
LCB	4	Seán Dowling (Milltown)
RHB	5	Jack Farrell (Carbury)
CHB	6	Mick Carolan (Raheens)
LHB	7	Ray O'Sullivan (Sarsfields)
MF	8	Pat Mangan (Carbury)
MF	9	Eamon O'Donoghue (Sallins)
RHF	10	Hugh Hyland (Monasterevan)
CHF	11	Patsy Kelly (Allenwood)
LHF	12	Jack O'Connell (Rathangan)
RCF	13	Kevin Kelly (Carbury)
FF	14	Tommy Carew (Clane)
LCF	15	Terry O'Brien (Moorefield)
Substitutes:
	16	Bernie Geraghty (Sarsfields) for O'Brien
	17	Tony Smullen (Suncroft) for Sullivan

GK	1	Seán Toal (O'Raghallaighs)
RCB	2	Jim Thornton (Cooley Kickhams)
FB	3	Jimmy Mulroy (Newtown Blues)
LCB	4	Danny Culligan (St Joseph's)
RHB	5	Leslie Toal (Clan na Gael)
CHB	6	Paul Kenny (Dundalk Gaels)
LHB	7	Eugene Sheelan (St Patrick's)
MF	8	Séamus Kirk (St Bride's)
MF	9	Gerry Sheridan (Glyde Rangers)
RHF	10	Danny Nugent (Newtown Blues)
CHF	11	Peadar McParland (Cooley Kickhams)
LHF	12	Benny Gaughran (UCD, Dublin)
RCF	13	Damien Reid (Mattock Rangers)
FF	14	Dermot Drumgoole (St Joseph's)
LCF	15	Enda McGeough (St Bride's)
Substitutes:
	16	Muckle McKeown (O'Raghallaighs) for Reid
