= 2016 O'Byrne Cup =

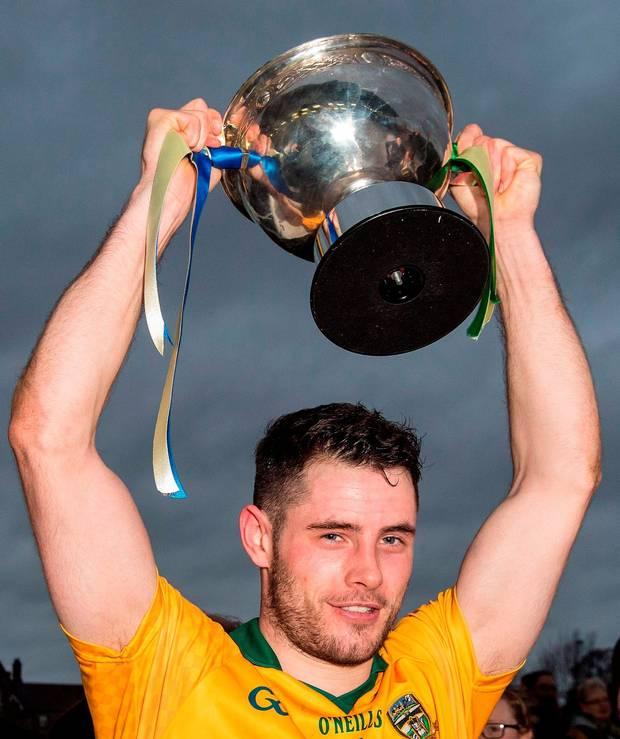
- Donal Keogan lifts the O'Byrne Cup

Tournament details
- Province: Leinster
- Year: 2016
- Trophy: O'Byrne Cup

Winners
- Champions: Meath (9th win)
- Manager: Mick O'Dowd
- Captain: Donal Keogan

Runners-up
- Runners-up: Longford
- Manager: Denis Connerton

The 2016 O'Byrne Cup was a Gaelic football competition played by the teams of Leinster GAA. The competition differs from the Leinster Senior Football Championship as it also features further education colleges and the winning team does not progress to another tournament at All-Ireland level.

Meath were the winners.

== Format ==
16 teams compete: 11 county teams (all those of Leinster except Kilkenny) and 5 third-level teams: DIT, UCD, IT Carlow, DCU and Maynooth University.

The teams are drawn into 4 groups of 4 teams each. Each team plays the other teams in its group once, earning 2 points for a win and 1 for a draw. The four group winners progress to the semi-finals.

== Group A ==
Table	P	W	D	L	F	A	+/-	Pts
Dublin	3	2	1	0	64	41	23	5
DCU	3	2	0	1	55	37	18	4
Wexford	3	1	1	1	47	38	9	3
IT Carlow	3	0	0	3	41	91	-50	0

3 January 2016	Wexford	2-6 - 0-12	Dublin	Enniscorthy; Referee: J Hickey
3 January 2016	A Flynn (1-1), B Brosnan (1-1), R Vallejo, K Rowe, K O'Grady, PJ Banville (0-1) each		D Rock (0-6), C Reddin, J Whelan, S Carthy, C Costello, P Andrews, C O'Callaghan (0-1) each	Enniscorthy; Referee: J Hickey

3 January 2016	IT Carlow	2-6 - 3-20	DCU	Fenagh; Referee: F Barry
3 January 2016	S McGraynor (2-3), D Aston (0-3)		C McGraynor (1-7), C McHugh (1-2), D Mannix (0-5), E Smith (1-1), C McNally (0-3), S Carey (0-1), S Attride (0-1)	Fenagh; Referee: F Barry

6 January 2016	Dublin	3-24 - 2-8	IT Carlow	Blanchardstown
6 January 2016	C Costello (2-6), P Andrews (1-3), M Deegan (0-5), T Brady (0-2), J Whelan (0-2), S Carthy (0-2), C McGuire (0-2), N Scully (0-1), P McMahon (0-1)		C Healy (1-3), M Sherry (1-0), C Conroy (0-2), K Ryan (0-2), N Kane (0-1)	Blanchardstown

6 January 2016	Wexford	1-3 - 1-8	DCU	Enniscorthy
6 January 2016	J Carthy (1-0), K O'Grady (0-3)		C McGraynor (1-1), C McHugh (0-2), M Plunkett (0-2), S Carthy (0-1), C Breheny (0-1), D Mannix (0-1)	Enniscorthy

10 January 2016	Wexford	3-20 - 1-12	IT Carlow	Bunclody
10 January 2016	T Rossiter (0-6), D Shanley (0-5), K Rowe (1-2), K O'Grady (0-3), S Ryan (1-0), B Brosnan (0-2), P Curtis (1-0), K Butler (0-1), C Kehoe (0-1)		B McHugh (0-8), C Healy (1-4)	Bunclody

10 January 2016	Dublin	1-16 - 1-12	DCU	Parnell Park
10 January 2016	D Rock (0-6), C O'Callaghan (1-2), C Costello (0-3), S Carthy (0-2), P Andrews (0-2), J Whelan (0-1)		S Carey (0-7), E Smith (1-3), M Quinn (0-1), D Byrne (0-1)	Parnell Park

== Group B ==
Table	P	W	D	L	F	A	+/-	Pts
Louth	3	2	0	1	57	33	24	4
Kildare	3	2	0	1	45	38	7	4
Offaly	3	1	0	2	34	42	-8	2
DIT	3	1	0	2	39	62	-23	2

- Louth are placed ahead of Kildare because they won the head-to-head game between the teams.

3 January 2016	Kildare	0-24 - 1-7	DIT	Newbridge; Referee: S Johnson
3 January 2016	A Tyrrell (0-9), E O'Flaherty (0-6), D Flynn (0-3), C McNally (0-2), R Houlihan, F Dowling, S Hanafin, R Cahill (0-1) each		B McMahon (0-5), C Madden (1-1), K O'Gara (0-1)	Newbridge; Referee: S Johnson

3 January 2016	Louth	1-9 - 0-13	Offaly	Darver Centre of Excellence; Referee: B Cawley
3 January 2016	J McEneaney (1-5), C Judge (0-2), G McSorley (0-1), R Holcroft (0-1)		B Allen (0-4), J Maher (0-3), S Doyle (0-3), C McNamee (0-1), C Donoghue (0-1), M Brazil (0-1)	Darver Centre of Excellence; Referee: B Cawley

6 January 2016	Kildare	0-8 - 2-11	Louth	Hawkfield; Referee: S Culhair
6 January 2016	R Cahill (0-4), M Conway (0-1), E Heavey (0-1), E Callaghan (0-1), C McNally (0-1)		J Califf (1-8), B Flannagan (1-0), R Holcroft (0-2), J McEneaney (0-1)	Hawkfield; Referee: S Culhair

6 January 2016	DIT	2-11 - 0-10	Offaly	Haggardstown; Referee: N McKenna
6 January 2016	K O'Gara (1-3), B McMahon (0-4), R Connelly (1-0), L Irwin (0-2), G Guilfoyle (0-1), C Madden (0-1)		N Dunne (0-5), A Sullivan (0-2), W Mulhall (0-1), S Dooley (0-1), J Gethings (0-1)	Haggardstown; Referee: N McKenna

10 January 2016	Offaly	0-11 - 0-13	Kildare	Tullamore
10 January 2016	J Evans (0-3), J Maher (0-3), S Moriarty (0-1), S Nally (0-1), S Dooley (0-1), R McNamee (0-1), S Doyle (0-1)		R Cahill (0-5), E O'Connor (0-3), C McNally (0-2), M Byrne (0-1), A Tyrrell (0-1), S Hannafin (0-1)	Tullamore

10 January 2016	Louth	3-19 - 1-9	DIT	Darver Centre of Excellence
10 January 2016	J McEneaney (1-6), T Durnin (1-1), B Flannagan (1-1), D Byrne (0-3), R Holcroft (0-3), C McKeever (0-3), A Reid (0-1), M Rafferty (0-1)		K O'Gara (0-6), C Madden (0-3), E O Conghaile (1-0)	Darver Centre of Excellence

== Group C ==
Table	P	W	D	L	F	A	+/-	Pts
Meath	3	2	0	1	54	35	19	4
UCD	3	2	0	1	45	34	11	4
Laois	3	2	0	1	46	46	0	4
Carlow	3	0	0	3	29	59	-30	0

3 January 2016	Carlow	1-4 - 1-18	Meath	Carlow; Referee: C Dwyer
3 January 2016	C Blake (0-4), B Kavanagh (1-0)		M Newman (0-7), M Battersby (1-2), G Reilly (0-3), D McDonagh (0-3), H Rooney (0-1), S Tobin (0-1), P Geraghty (0-1)	Carlow; Referee: C Dwyer

3 January 2016	Laois	1-10 - 1-9	UCD	Ratheniska; Referee: P Maguire
3 January 2016	D Kingston (0-4), J Farrell (1-0), K Meaney (0-2), A Farrell (0-1), J O'Loughlin (0-1), N Murphy (0-1), R O'Connor (0-1)		J Heslin (0-4), L Kelly (1-0), C McCarthy (0-3), F Andrews (0-1), R Carr (0-1)	Ratheniska; Referee: P Maguire

6 January 2016	Laois	1-16 - 1-9	Carlow	Portlaoise
6 January 2016	G Walsh (0-5), D Kingston (0-4), P Cahillane (1-1), J O'Loughlin (0-2), E Costello (0-1), A Farrell (0-1), K Meaney (0-1), R O'Connor (0-1)		J Murphy (1-0), G Kelly (0-2), D O'Brien (0-2), D Lunney (0-2), B Murphy (0-1), E Finnegan (0-1), J Kennedy (0-1)	Portlaoise

6 January 2016	Meath	0-11 - 2-8	UCD	Simonstown
6 January 2016	S Tobin (0-3), M Newman (0-2), D Lenihan (0-2), B O'Brien (0-1), C O'Sullivan (0-1), E Wallace (0-1), B Tormay (0-1)		T Hayes (1-1), C Basquel (1-0), J Heslin (0-2), J McEntee (0-2), C McCarthy (0-1), L Casey (0-1), E Lowry (0-1)	Simonstown

10 January 2016	Meath	2-16 - 0-14	Laois	Navan
10 January 2016	G Reilly (1-4), S Tobin (0-5), M Newman (1-0), C O'Sullivan (0-2), D Lenihan (0-2), D Keogan (0-1), A Douglas (0-1), H Rooney (0-1)		D Kingston (0-8), P Cahillane (0-2), G Dillon (0-1), N Murphy (0-1), E Costello (0-1), G Walsh (0-1)	Navan

10 January 2016	Carlow	1-7 - 2-13	UCD	Carlow
10 January 2016	D Foley (1-5), C Blake (0-1), P Broderick (0-1)		R Carr (1-4), E Lowry (1-4), P Mannion (0-1), L Kelly (0-1), P Kingston (0-1), N O'Reilly (0-1), E O'Byrne (0-1)	Carlow

== Group D ==
Table	P	W	D	L	F	A	+/-	Pts
Longford	3	2	0	1	43	34	9	4
Maynooth	3	2	0	1	40	36	4	4
Westmeath	3	2	0	1	40	36	4	4
Wicklow	3	0	0	3	30	47	-17	0

3 January 2016	Wicklow	0-13 - 1-14	Westmeath	Bray; Referee: B Tiernan
3 January 2016	R Finn (0-5), A McLoughlin (0-2), P Byrne (0-2), D Healy (0-1), C Murphy (0-1), D Hayden (0-1), C Fitzgerald (0-1)		J Connellan (1-6), S Dempsey (0-4), P Sharry (0-2), G Egan (0-1), C McCormack (0-1)	Bray; Referee: B Tiernan

3 January 2016	Longford	0-18 - 1-9	Maynooth	Longford; Referee: D Gough
3 January 2016	J McGivney (0-5), R Smyth (0-5), B Kavanagh (0-4), B Farrell (0-2), B McKeon (0-1), A Dalton (0-1)		N Flynn (0-5), E O'Carroll (1-0), J Wallace (0-2), B Duggan (0-1)	Longford; Referee: D Gough

6 January 2016	Westmeath	0-14 - 1-10	Longford	Mullingar
6 January 2016	K Martin (0-4), G Egan (0-4), C McCormack (0-2), D Daly (0-1), R Foley (0-1), D Corroon (0-1), L Dolan (0-1)		B Kavanagh (0-4), M Brady (1-0), B McKeon (0-2), A Dalton (0-2), C Smyth (0-1), D Gallagher (0-1)	Mullingar

6 January 2016	Wicklow	0-9 - 1-15	Maynooth	Rathdrum
6 January 2016	M O'Connor (0-3), N Gaffney (0-2), P Cunningham (0-2), G Allen (0-1), E Murtagh (0-1)		N Flynn (0-7), R Kennedy (1-3), R McManus (0-4), F Conway (0-1)	Rathdrum

10 January 2016	Longford	1-9 - 1-5	Wicklow	Longford
10 January 2016	J McGivney (1-0), D McElligott (0-2), F McGee (0-2), D Masterson (0-1), C Smyth (0-1), R Smyth (0-1), D Gallagher (0-1), P McKeon (0-1)		P Byrne (1-2), C Murphy (0-1), R Finn (0-1), C Fitzgerald (0-1)	Longford

10 January 2016	Westmeath	0-9 - 0-10	Maynooth	Attendance: Moate
10 January 2016	G Egan (0-4), R Sharry (0-2), D Corroon (0-1), L Dolan (0-1), K Martin (0-1)		R Kennedy (0-6), E O'Carroll (0-2), B Duggan (0-1), R McManus (0-1)	Attendance: Moate

== Semi-finals ==
17 January 2016; Semi-final	Meath	0-11 – 0-10	Louth	Drogheda Park

17 January 2016; Semi-final	Dublin	0-9 – 1-12	Longford	Pearse Park, Longford; Attendance: 2,000; Referee: J Hickey (Carlow)
17 January 2016; Semi-final		Report		Pearse Park, Longford; Attendance: 2,000; Referee: J Hickey (Carlow)

== Final ==
24 January 2016; 2:40 p.m. Final	Meath	1-17 – 1-11	Longford	Páirc Tailteann, Navan; Referee: B Cawley (Kildare)
24 January 2016; 2:40 p.m. Final	G Reilly 0-6; M Newman 0-4 (4f); C O’Sullivan 1-1; D Lenihan, S Tobin 0-2 each; D Smyth, R Ó Coilleann 0-1 each	Report	F McGee 0-6 (3f, 1 '45'); R Smyth 1-2; B McKeon, L Connerton, M Brady 0-1 each	Páirc Tailteann, Navan; Referee: B Cawley (Kildare)
