= 2003 O'Byrne Cup =

Tournament details
- Province: Leinster
- Year: 2003
- Trophy: O'Byrne Cup

Winners
- Champions: Kildare (8th win)
- Manager: Pádraig Nolan

Runners-up
- Runners-up: Longford

The 2003 O'Byrne Cup was a Gaelic football competition played by the teams of Leinster GAA.

== O'Byrne Cup ==
First round 5 January 2003
Longford	0-13
Laois	0-10
Kilkenny	1-6
Wexford	0-17
Wicklow	2-12
Carlow	2-9
Westmeath	0-13
Louth	0-11

Quarter-finals; 12/14 January 2003
Longford	1-11
Meath	0-11
Wexford	2-11
Offaly	1-10
Dublin	2-13
Wicklow	0-5
Kildare	2-11
Westmeath	0-13

Semi-finals; 19 January 2003
Longford	0-16
Wexford	2-9
Dublin	2-9
Kildare	0-10

Final; 26 January 2003
Longford	1-6
Kildare	0-12
