= 2017 O'Byrne Cup =

Tournament details
- Province: Leinster
- Year: 2017
- Trophy: O'Byrne Cup

Winners
- Champions: Dublin (9th win)
- Manager: Paul Clarke
- Captain: Ciarán Reddin

Runners-up
- Runners-up: Louth
- Manager: Colin Kelly

The 2017 O'Byrne Cup was played by county and further education college teams of Leinster GAA in January 2017 and was won by Dublin.

== Format ==
16 teams compete: 11 county teams (all those of Leinster except Kilkenny) and 5 third-level teams (DIT, UCD, IT Carlow, DCU–Dóchas Éireann and Maynooth University).

The teams are drawn into 4 groups of 4 teams each. Each team plays the other teams in their group once, earning 2 points for a win and 1 for a draw. The four group winners compete in the semi-finals.

== Group stage ==
=== Group 1 ===
Table	P	W	D	L	F	A	+/-	Pts
Dublin	3	2	0	1	46	38	8	4
Wexford	3	1	1	1	44	45	-1	3
UCD	3	1	1	1	47	51	-4	3
DCU–Dóchas Éireann	3	1	0	2	39	42	-3	2

=== Group 2 ===
Table	P	W	D	L	F	A	+/-	Pts
Kildare	3	3	0	0	74	21	+53	6
Longford	3	2	0	1	55	45	+10	4
Offaly	3	1	0	2	50	41	+9	2
IT Carlow	3	0	0	3	23	95	–72	0

=== Group 3 ===
Table	P	W	D	L	F	A	+/-	Pts
Meath	3	2	1	0	6-50	1-35	+30	5
Laois	3	2	1	0	4-48	3-29	+22	5
DIT	3	1	0	3	1-28	4-37	–18	2
Wicklow	3	0	0	3	2-24	3-49	–34	0

- Meath finished 1st due to their better score difference.

=== Group 4 ===
Table	P	W	D	L	F	A	+/-	Pts
Louth	3	3	0	0	51	40	+11	6
Westmeath	3	2	0	1	57	49	+8	4
Carlow	3	1	0	3	62	60	+2	2
Maynooth University	3	0	0	3	46	67	–21	0

== Knockout stage ==
=== Semi-finals ===
22 January 2017; 2:00 pm Semi-Final	Kildare	2-8 – 0-16	Dublin	St Conleth's Park; Referee: David Hickey (Carlow)
22 January 2017; 2:00 pm Semi-Final	Johnny Byrne and Daniel Flynn 1-0 each, Niall Kelly, Paul Cribbin, Neil Flynn (0-1f) 0-2 each, Kevin Feely and Ben McCormack 0-1 each	Report	Paul Hudson 0-4 (0-2f), Niall Scully and Conor McHugh (0-1f) 0-3 each, Ciaran Reddin, Jason Whelan, Ross Hazley, Shane Boland, Colm Basquel, Shane Cunningham 0-1 each	St Conleth's Park; Referee: David Hickey (Carlow)

22 January 2017; 2 p.m. Semi-Final	Meath	0-10 – 1-14	Louth	Páirc Tailteann, Navan; Referee: D. Moore (Laois)
22 January 2017; 2 p.m. Semi-Final	R. Ó Coileáin (0-3, 2 frees); C. Downey (0-2); E. Wallace, S, Tobin (45), B. McMahon (free), B. Menton, C. O’Brien (0-1 each).	Report	J. McEneaney (1-1, 1-0 pen); D. Maguire, S Mulroy (1 45, 1 free) (0-3 each); T. Durnin, A. McDonnell (0-2 each); A. Williams, D. Byrne, P Smith (0-1 each).	Páirc Tailteann, Navan; Referee: D. Moore (Laois)

=== Final ===
29 January 2017; 2:00 pm Final	Dublin	2-16 – 1-10	Louth	Gaelic Grounds, Drogheda; Attendance: 3,500; Referee: John Hickey (Carlow); Man of the Match: Niall Scully
29 January 2017; 2:00 pm Final	Paul Hudson 0-6 (0-3f), Colm Basquel 1-1, Killian O'Gara 1-0, Ciarán Reddin 0-3 (1 '45), Conor Mullally, Jason Whelan, Niall Scully, Conor McHugh, Shane Cunningham, Ross O'Brien 0-1 each	Report	Páraic Smith 0-5, Pádraig Rath 1-0, Ronan Holcroft and Sam Mulroy (0-2f) 0-2 each, Bevan Duffy 0-1.	Gaelic Grounds, Drogheda; Attendance: 3,500; Referee: John Hickey (Carlow); Man of the Match: Niall Scully

GK	1	Evan Comerford (Ballymun Kickhams)
RCB	2	Ross McGowan (Kilmacud Crokes)
FB	3	Eoin O'Brien (Castleknock)
LCB	4	Jack Smith (Skerries Harps)
RHB	5	Robbie Gaughan (Ballinteer St John's)
CHB	6	Ciarán Reddin (St Maur's)
LHB	7	Conor Mullally (Cuala)
MF	8	Jason Whelan (Ballymun Kickhams)
MF	9	Ross Hazley (St Sylvester's)
RHF	10	Niall Scully (Templeogue/Synge Street)
CHF	11	Shane Boland (Castleknock)
LHF	12	Niall Walsh (St Oliver Plunketts/Eoghan Ruadh)
RCF	13	Conor McHugh (Na Fianna)
FF	14	Shane Cunningham (Kilmacud Crokes)
LCF	15	Paul Hudson (Thomas Davis)
Substitutes:
	16	Emmett Ó Conghaile (Lucan Sarsfields) for Hazley
	17	Colm Basquel (Ballyboden St Enda's) for Boland
	18	Tom Shields (Castleknock) for Mullally
	19	Gary Sweeney (St Sylvester's) for Walsh
	20	Killian O'Gara (Templeogue/Synge Street) for Cunningham
	21	Seán Newcombe (Lucan Sarsfields) for Whelan
	22	Ross O'Brien (St Jude's) for McHugh

GK	1	Craig Lynch (Naomh Máirtín)
RCB	2	Pádraig Rath (Dreadnots)
FB	3	Patrick Reilly (St Bride's)
LCB	4	Kevin Carr (Newtown Blues)
RHB	5	Derek Maguire (Dundalk Young Irelands)
CHB	6	Darren McMahon (St Mochta's)
LHB	7	Anthony Williams (Dreadnots)
MF	8	Tommy Durnin (Westerns)
MF	9	Andy McDonnell (Newtown Blues)
RHF	10	James Stewart (Dundalk Gaels)
CHF	11	Páraic Smith (Dreadnots)
LHF	12	Bevan Duffy (St Fechin's)
RCF	13	Conall McKeever (Clan Na Gael)
FF	14	Jim McEneaney (Geraldines)
LCF	15	Ronan Holcroft (St Fechin's)
Substitutes:
	16	Adrian Reid (Mattock Rangers) for McKeever
	17	Ryan Burns (Hunterstown Rovers) for McEneaney
	18	Declan Byrne (St Mochta's) for McMahon
	19	Eoin O'Connor (St Patrick's) for Durnin
	20	Sam Mulroy (Naomh Máirtín) for Holcroft
	21	Ruairí Moore (O'Raghallaighs) for McDonnell
	22	Ross Nally (Newtown Blues) for Smith
