= 1999 O'Byrne Cup =

Tournament details
- Province: Leinster
- Year: 1999
- Trophy: O'Byrne Cup
- Date: 10 January — 6 March
- Teams: 10

Winners
- Champions: Dublin (5th win)
- Manager: Tommy Carr
- Captain: Dessie Farrell

Runners-up
- Runners-up: Louth

Other
- Matches played: 9

The 1999 O'Byrne Cup was a Gaelic football competition played by the county teams of Leinster GAA.

The tournament was a straight knockout, with 10 teams. Kildare (who took a team holiday instead) and Kilkenny did not compete.

Dublin were the winners, defeating Louth in the final in Parnell Park, a victory overshadowed by the death of one of the umpires, John Buckley, shortly after the game.

== Results ==
First round 10 January 1999
Carlow	2-11
Wexford	0-12
Westmeath	1-10
Laois	0-6

Quarter-finals; 17/24 January 1999
Carlow	1-2
Dublin	2-10
Offaly	0-6
Westmeath	1-8
Longford	1-7
Louth	1-10
Meath	0-9
Wicklow	0-13

Semi-finals; 31 January 1999
Dublin	0-13
Westmeath	1-9
Louth	1-10
Wicklow	0-9

Final; 6 March 1999
Dublin	1-16
Louth	1-10

=== Final ===
7 March 1999	Dublin	1-16 - 1-10	Louth	Parnell Park, Dublin
	D. Darcy 1-4 (3f), M. O'Keeffe 0-4 (2f), B. Irwin, C. Whelan, N. O'Donoghue 0-2 each, E. Crennan, S. Connell 0-1 each		A. Doherty 0-5 (5f), S. O'Neill 1-0, S. White 0-2, S. O'Hanlon, C. Fitzpatrick, A. Rooney 0-1 each	Referee: C. Buckley (Offaly)

GK	1	Keith Gorman (O'Dwyer's)
RCB	2	Paddy Moran (Whitehall Colmcille)
FB	3	Paddy Christie (Ballymun Kickhams)
LCB	4	Tomo Lynch (Na Fianna)
RHB	5	Mick Casey (Lucan Sarsfields)
CHB	6	Ian Robertson (Ballymun Kickhams)
LHB	7	Keith Galvin (St Sylvester's)
MF	8	Ciarán Whelan (Raheny)
MF	9	Enda Sheehy (St Jude's)
RHF	10	Senan Connell (Na Fianna)
CHF	11	Declan Darcy (St Brigid's)
LHF	12	Enda Crennan (St Jude's)
RCF	13	Niall O'Donoghue (Ballymun Kickhams)
FF	14	Brian Irwin (Naomh Mearnóg)
LCF	15	Mick O'Keeffe (Kilmacud Crokes)
Substitutes:
	16	Paul Curran (Thomas Davis) for Lynch
	17	Dessie Farrell (Na Fianna) for Crennan

GK	1	Niall O'Donnell (Clan na Gael)
RCB	2	Breen Phillips (Newtown Blues)
FB	3	Stephen Melia (St Joseph's)
LCB	4	Colin Fitzpatrick (Oliver Plunketts)
RHB	5	Jonathan Clerkin (Cooley Kickhams)
CHB	6	John Donaldson (Stabannon Parnells)
LHB	7	Peter McGinnity (Dundalk Gaels)
MF	8	Séamus O'Hanlon (Clan na Gael)
MF	9	Ken Reilly (Stabannon Parnells)
RHF	10	Nicky Malone (Lann Léire)
CHF	11	Seán O'Neill (Cooley Kickhams)
LHF	12	Aidan O'Neill (Roche Emmets)
RCF	13	Ollie McDonnell (St Joseph's)
FF	14	Stefan White (Burren, Down)
LCF	15	Alan Doherty (St Mary's)
Substitutes:
	16	Alan Rooney (St Mary's) for McGinnity
	17	Cathal O'Hanlon (Clan na Gael) for O'Neill
	18	Niall Sharkey (St Mary's) for Reilly
