= 1990 O'Byrne Cup =

Gaelic football competition, Leinster, Ireland

Tournament details
- Province: Leinster
- Year: 1990
- Trophy: O'Byrne Cup
- Date: 7 April — 23 May
- Teams: 11

Winners
- Champions: Louth (3rd win)
- Manager: Frank Lynch
- Captain: Gerry Farrell

Runners-up
- Runners-up: Kildare
- Manager: Pat Fitzgerald
- Captain: Paddy O'Donoghue

The 1990 O'Byrne Cup was a Gaelic football competition contested by the county teams of Leinster GAA.

The tournament format was straight knockout, with 11 participating teams. Dublin did not enter the competition. First-round byes were awarded to Laois, Louth, Meath, Longford and Kildare.

Louth won the competition after defeating Kildare in the final, held at the Drogheda Gaelic Grounds.

== Results ==
First round 7 - 14 April
Wexford	3-09
Wicklow	0-04
Carlow	2-13
Kilkenny	1-06
Westmeath	0-11
Offaly	0-11
Westmeath	1-08
Offaly	1-07

Quarter-finals; 14 - 18 April
Wexford	0-12
Laois	2-05
Carlow	1-09
Kildare	1-12
Louth	1-12
Meath	2-06
Westmeath	1-09
Longford	2-08

Semi-finals; 21 - 25 April
Wexford	1-04
Kildare	2-11
Louth	2-11
Longford	1-13

Final; 23 May
Kildare	1-06
Louth	2-04

=== Final ===
23 May 1990	Louth	2-04 - 1-06	Kildare	Gaelic Grounds, Drogheda
	C. Kelly 2-1, G. Curran, S. O'Hanlon, S. White 0-1 each		B. Donovan 1-0, D. Kerrigan 0-2, C. Barry, M. Lynch, S. McGovern, P. O'Donoghue 0-1 each	Referee: D. Guerin (Dublin)

GK	1	Gerry Farrell (Cooley Kickhams) (c)
RCB	2	David Reilly (Stabannon Parnells)
FB	3	Martin Morgan (Naomh Máirtín)
LCB	4	Brendan Kerin (St Mary's)
RHB	5	Pat Butterly (Stabannon Parnells)
CHB	6	Stephen Melia (John Mitchels)
LHB	7	Peter Fitzpatrick (Clan na Gael)
MF	8	Gerry Curran (Clan na Gael)
MF	9	Michael Fegan (Kilkerley Emmets)
RHF	10	Séamus O'Hanlon (Clan na Gael)
CHF	11	Michael Malone (St Mary's)
LHF	12	Cathal O'Hanlon (Clan na Gael)
RCF	13	Stefan White (Castleblayney Faughs)
FF	14	John Fox (St Joseph's)
LCF	15	Colin Kelly (Newtown Blues)
Substitutes:
	16	John Osborne (Naomh Fionnbarra) for Fegan

GK	1	Seán Sergeant (Eadestown)
RCB	2	Davy Dalton (Kilcock)
FB	3	David Malone (Raheens)
LCB	4	P.J. Doran (Johnstownbridge)
RHB	5	Seán Ryan (St Laurence's)
CHB	6	Peter McConnon (Round Towers)
LHB	7	Séamus Dowling (Moorefield)
MF	8	Brian Donovan (Celbridge)
MF	9	Seán McGovern (Athy)
RHF	10	Joe O'Donoghue (Johnstownbridge)
CHF	11	Paddy O'Donoghue (Johnstownbridge) (c)
LHF	12	David Fennin (Castlemitchell)
RCF	13	Declan Kerrigan (Johnstownbridge)
FF	14	John Crofton (Sarsfields)
LCF	15	Liam Miley (St Laurence's)
Substitutes:
	16	Martin Lynch (Clane) for Kerrigan
	17	Clifford Barry (Monasterevan) for Donovan
	18	Mick Nevin (Maynooth) for Miley
