= 2018 O'Byrne Cup =

Tournament details
- Province: Leinster
- Year: 2018
- Trophy: O'Byrne Cup

Winners
- Champions: Meath (10th win)
- Manager: Andy McEntee
- Captain: Bryan Menton

Runners-up
- Runners-up: Westmeath
- Manager: Colin Kelly
- Captain: John Heslin

Other
- Matches played: 14

The 2018 O'Byrne Cup was played by county teams of Leinster GAA. It began in December 2017 and ended in May 2018.

On 14 January 2018, the result of the Meath versus Longford semi-final was determined by a free-taking competition, as the score was level at the end of both normal time and extra time. Each side took five free kicks from the forty five metre line and Meath won 2–1. This was the first inter-county Gaelic match to be decided in this way (previously the match would have been replayed).

The final was delayed on multiple occasions due to bad weather; it was finally played in May, with Meath the winners.

== Format ==
There are 11 teams, in three groups of three teams and one group two teams. In the three-team groups, each team plays the other teams once; in the two-team group, the teams play each other in two games. Two group points are awarded for a win and one for a draw.

The four group winners play in the semi-finals and final. If a game is level after the normal seventy minutes, two ten minute periods of extra time are played each way. If the score is still level after extra time, a free-taking competition is held to determine the result.

== Group stage ==
=== Group 1 ===
Team	Pld	W	D	L	Pts	Diff
Offaly	2	1	1	0	3	+16
Wexford	2	1	0	1	2	–15
Dublin	2	0	1	1	1	–1

30 December 2017; 2:00 pm	Offaly	3-16 - 0-9	Wexford	O'Connor Park; Referee: Niall Ward
30 December 2017; 2:00 pm	Jordan Hayes 2-0, Bernard Allen 0-6 (0-2f), Cian Johnston 1-3, Sean Doyle 0-4 (0-2f), Bobby O'Dea, Joey O'Connor, Shane Tierney 0-1 each		Donal Shanley 0-3f, Donnacha Holmes 0-2, Conor Carty, Glen Malone, Mark Rossiter, Cathal Devereux 0-1 each	O'Connor Park; Referee: Niall Ward

3 January 2018; 8:00 pm	Dublin	1-13 - 0-16	Offaly	Parnell Park; Referee: Brendan Cawley
3 January 2018; 8:00 pm	Colm Basquel 1-6 (0-3f), Shane Carthy 0-3 (0-1f), Gerry Seaver, Kieran Doherty, Killian O'Gara, Chris Carthy 0-1 each	Report	Cian Johnston 0-6, Nigel Dunne 0-4 (0-3f), Anton Sullivan 0-2, Cian Donohue, Declan Hogan, Jordan Hayes, Joey O'Connor 0-1 each	Parnell Park; Referee: Brendan Cawley

7 January 2018; 2:00 pm	Wexford	1-12 – 0-14	Dublin	St. Patrick's Park, Enniscorthy; Referee: David Hickey (Carlow)
7 January 2018; 2:00 pm		Report		St. Patrick's Park, Enniscorthy; Referee: David Hickey (Carlow)

=== Group 2 ===
Team	Pld	W	D	L	Pts	Diff
Longford	2	2	0	0	4	+10
Louth	2	1	0	1	2	+2
Kildare	2	0	0	2	0	–12

30 December 2017; 2:00 pm	Louth	1-10 - 2-13	Longford	Darver; Referee: Patrick Coyle
30 December 2017; 2:00 pm	Ross Nally 1-1, Sam Mulroy 0-3 (0-2f), William Woods (0-1f) and James Butler 0-2 each, Andy McDonnell and Jim McEneaney 0-1		Sean McCormack 0-6 (0-4f), Pauric Gill 1-1, Andrew Farrell 1-0, Ronan McEntire 0-2, Paddy Collum (1 '45), Michael Quinn, Dessie Reynolds, Connor Berry 0-1 each	Darver; Referee: Patrick Coyle

3 January 2018; 8:00 pm	Kildare	0-9 - 2-11	Louth	Hawkfield; Referee: Fergal Smyth
3 January 2018; 8:00 pm	Neil Flynn 0-3, Brian McLoughlin 0-2 (2 frees); Luke Flynn 0-1, Johnny Byrne 0-1, Chris Healy 0-1, Kevin Flynn 0-1		Tadhg McEneaney 2-0, Andy McDonnell 0-2, James Butler 0-2 (2 frees), Tommy Durnin 0-2 (1 free), Bevan Duffy 0-1, Gerard McSorley 0-1, Ronan Holcroft 0-1, William woods 0-1, Niall Conlon 0-1.	Hawkfield; Referee: Fergal Smyth

7 January 2018; 2:00 pm	Longford	1-14 – 0-13	Kildare	Pearse Park, Longford; Referee: Chris Dwyer
7 January 2018; 2:00 pm	R Smyth 1-3 (0-1f); S McCormack 0-6 (4f); R Brady 0-4; D Reynolds 0-1	Report	K Feely 0-4 (4f); P Cribbin, D Flynn, F Dowling 0-2 each; E Lawless, L Flynn, T Moolick 0-1 each	Pearse Park, Longford; Referee: Chris Dwyer

=== Group 3 ===
Team	Pld	W	D	L	Pts	Diff
Meath	2	2	0	0	4	+20
Carlow	2	1	0	1	2	+9
Wicklow	2	0	0	2	0	–29

30 December 2017; 2:00 pm	Carlow	3-8 - 0-6	Wicklow	Bray Emmets; Referee: James King
30 December 2017; 2:00 pm	John Murphy 2-1 (1-0 pen), Sean Gannon 1-0, Paul Broderick (0-1f) and Darragh Foly (0-1f) 0-2 each, Ciaran Moran, Diarmuid Walshe, Jamie Clarke 0-1 each		Mark Jackson (0-2f) and Darren Hayden 0-2 each, Rory Finn and Seanie Furlong (0-1f) 0-1 each	Bray Emmets; Referee: James King

3 January 2018; 8:00 pm	Meath	0-9 - 0-7	Carlow	Dr. Cullen Park; Referee: Seamus Mulhare
3 January 2018; 8:00 pm	Ben Brennan 0-4 (0-1f), Donal Lenihan 0-3, Graham Reilly and Thomas O'Reilly 0-1 each		Diarmuid Walshe 0-3 (0-2f), Darragh O'Brien 0-2 (0-1f), Daniel St. Ledger (1 '45) and Darragh Foley 0-1 each	Dr. Cullen Park; Referee: Seamus Mulhare

7 January 2018; 2:00 pm	Meath	4-19 – 0-13	Wicklow	Páirc Tailteann; Referee: Stephen Murphy (Louth)
7 January 2018; 2:00 pm		Report		Páirc Tailteann; Referee: Stephen Murphy (Louth)

=== Group 4 ===
Team	Pld	W	D	L	Pts	Diff
Westmeath	2	2	0	0	4	+10
Laois	2	0	0	2	0	–10

30 December 2017; 2:00 pm	Westmeath	1-13 - 1-12	Laois	Cusack Park; Referee: Patrick Maguire; Man of the Match: Luke Loughlin (The Downs)
30 December 2017; 2:00 pm	Luke Loughlin 0-5 (0-1f), James Dolan 1-0, Callum McCormack 0-3, Ger Leech (0-2f) and Finbar Coyne 0-2 each, Denis Corroon 0-1		Gary Walsh 0-9 (0-7f), Paul Kingston 1-0, Brian Glynn 0-2, Aaron Dowling 0-1	Cusack Park; Referee: Patrick Maguire; Man of the Match: Luke Loughlin (The Downs)

7 January 2018; 2:00 pm	Laois	1-13 – 3-16	Westmeath	Stradbally; Referee: Fintan Pierce (Offaly)
7 January 2018; 2:00 pm	Ross Munnelly 1-4 (0-2 frees), Eoin Lowry 0-6 (0-5 frees), Niall Donoher, Ronan Murray and Aaron Forbes 0-1 each	Report	Callum McCormack 3-3, Luke Loughlin 0-7 (0-2 frees), Kieran Martin 0-3, John Egan, Conor Slevin (free) and Alex Gardiner 0-1 each	Stradbally; Referee: Fintan Pierce (Offaly)

== Knockout stage ==
=== Semi-finals ===
14 January 2018
14:00 GMT
Semi-Final

Report

Meath	1-19 – 2-16 (a.e.t.) (2–1 fk)	Longford
(HT: 1-5 – 0-4)
Gls: S Tobin; Pts: B McMahon (4, 1f), S Tobin (2, 1f), B Menton (2), T O'Reilly (2), J Wallace (2), D O'Neill (2), B Conlon, D Toner, B Brennan (f), M McCabe, J McEntee		Gls: R Smyth, M Quinn; Pts: R Smyth (4, 2f), S McCormack (4, 1f), D Reynolds (2), R Brady (2), M Quinn, R McEntire, J McGivney, D Quinn
Free-taking competition
Seán Tobin; Mark McCabe; Cillian O'Sullivan; Joey Wallace; James McEntee		Robbie Smyth; Sean McCormack; Paddy Colum; Barry Gilleran; James McGiveney

Páirc Tailteann, Navan
Referee: Darragh Sheppard (Dublin)

14 January 2018
14:00 GMT
Semi-Final

Report

Westmeath	1-9 – 1-7	Offaly
(HT: 1-7 – 1-2)
Gls: D Corroon; Pts: L Loughlin (3, 2f), J Egan (2), D Corroon, C McCormack, K Martin, F Coyne		Gls: J O’Connor; Pts: C Johnson (2), N Dunne (2, 2f), J Hayes, M Brazil, B Allen

TEG Cusack Park, Mullingar
Referee: David Hickey (Carlow)

=== Final ===
13 May 2018
15:00 IST (UTC+1)
Final

Report

Westmeath	1-13 (16) – (25) 4-13	Meath

TEG Cusack Park, Mullingar
Referee: Fergal Smyth (Offaly)
