= Martin Flanagan =

Martin Flanagan may refer to:

- Martin Flanagan (journalist) (born 1955), Australian journalist
- Martin Flanagan (Gaelic footballer), Gaelic footballer for the Westmeath inter-county team, 1995–2010
