= 1954 O'Byrne Cup =

Gaelic football competition, Leinster, Ireland

Tournament details
- Province: Leinster
- Year: 1954
- Trophy: O'Byrne Cup
- Date: 11 April 1954 — 20 March 1955
- Teams: 12

Winners
- Champions: Offaly (1st win)
- Captain: Noel McGee

Runners-up
- Runners-up: Louth
- Captain: Tom Conlon

The 1954 O'Byrne Cup was a Gaelic football tournament contested by the county teams of Leinster GAA. It was the first staging of the competition, then referred to as the Matt Byrne Memorial Cup.

Offaly won the tournament after defeating Louth in the final, played at Croke Park on 20 March 1955.

== Format ==
The tournament was contested on a knockout basis. First-round byes were awarded to Carlow, Laois, Longford and Meath.

== Results ==
=== First Round ===
11 April 1954	Wexford	2-09 - 1-04	Kilkenny	O'Kennedy Park, New Ross

11 April 1954	Louth	6-05 - 1-10	Kildare	Gaelic Grounds, Drogheda

11 April 1954	Wicklow	3-10 - 0-03	Dublin	Aughrim

25 April 1954	Westmeath	0-06 - 0-10	Offaly	Cusack Park, Mullingar

=== Quarter-Finals ===
15 August 1954	Laois	2-08 - 1-10	Carlow	O'Moore Park, Portlaoise

22 August 1954	Offaly	3-08 - 0-06	Wexford	O'Connor Park, Tullamore

22 August 1954	Meath	5-07 - 0-02	Longford	Páirc Tailteann, Navan

29 August 1954	Louth	2-06 - 0-09	Wicklow	Páirc Mhuire, Ardee

=== Semi-Finals ===
12 September 1954	Meath	3-03 - 2-10	Louth	Páirc Tailteann, Navan

12 September 1954	Offaly	2-09 - 1-04	Laois	O'Connor Park, Tullamore

=== Final ===
20 March 1955	Offaly	0-10 - 1-05	Louth	Croke Park
	A. Kelly 0-3, C. Carroll, P. Casey 0-2 each, M. Casey, P. Fenlon, J. Kinahan 0-1 each		T. Rogers 1-0, A. Monk, P. Butterly 0-2 each, J. McDonnell 0-1	Referee: B. O'Riordan (Dublin)

GK	1	Liam Moran (Edenderry)
RCB	2	Noel McGee (Tullamore)
FB	3	Kevin Scally (Garda, Dublin)
LCB	4	Myles Nugent (Cloghan)
RHB	5	Mick Brady (Seán McDermotts, Dublin)
CHB	6	Peter Nolan (Clara)
LHB	7	Dickie Conroy (Tullamore)
MF	8	Mick Casey (Rhode)
MF	9	Paddy Casey (Rhode)
RHF	10	Alo Kelly (Tullamore)
CHF	11	Christy Carroll (Edenderry)
LHF	12	Johnny Kinahan (Seán McDermotts, Dublin)
RCF	13	Joe Bracken (Tullamore)
FF	14	Paddy Fenlon (Edenderry)
LCF	15	Christy Owens (Kilclonfert)
Substitutes:
	16	Oliver Redican (Tullamore) for Owens

GK	1	Michael McDonnell (Darver Volunteers)
RCB	2	Eugene Duffy (Dundalk Gaels)
FB	3	George Carroll (Oliver Plunketts)
LCB	4	Paddy McArdle (St Mary's)
RHB	5	Patsy Coleman (St Mary's)
CHB	6	Tom Conlon (Stabannon Parnells)
LHB	7	Stephen White (Dundalk Young Irelands)
MF	8	Hubert Reynolds (Oliver Plunketts)
MF	9	Jim McArdle (Stabannon Parnells)
RHF	10	Paddy Woods (Oliver Plunketts)
CHF	11	Patsy Byrne (Stabannon Parnells)
LHF	12	Alfie Monk (Naomh Mhuire)
RCF	13	Jimmy McDonnell (Darver Volunteers)
FF	14	Tom Rogers (Dundalk Gaels)
LCF	15	Paddy Butterly (Stabannon Parnells)
Substitutes:
	16	Jim Meehan (Naomh Mhuire) for J. McDonnell
	17	Larry McGrane (Stabannon Parnells) for Reynolds
