= 2013 Dr McKenna Cup =

Gaelic football competition

Tournament details
- Province: Ulster
- Year: 2013

The 2013 Dr McKenna Cup was a Gaelic football competition played under the auspices of Ulster GAA. The tournament features the 2012 All-Ireland Champions, Donegal, whose first game (away against Fermanagh) was put back for several days due to Donegal's team holiday in Dubai. Ahead of the tournament Queen's announced they were quitting in a controversy over their players being poached by other teams, though Ulster Council President Aogan Farrell had appealed for this practice to stop.

== Format ==
The teams are drawn into two groups of four teams and one of three. Each team plays the other teams in its group once, earning 2 points for a win and 1 for a draw. The three group winners, and the best runner-up (from the four-team groups) progress to the semi-finals.

== Results ==
=== Section A ===
Qualified for next round

Team	Pld	W	D	L	F	A	Diff	Pts
Monaghan	3	3	0	0	5-41	3-18	29	6
Fermanagh	3	2	0	1	4-37	4-24	13	4
Donegal	3	1	0	2	4-26	7-41	-24	2
St Mary's University College, Belfast	3	0	0	3	5-21	4-42	-18	0

- Fermanagh v Donegal
  - Hogan Stand
- Donegal v Monaghan
  - Donegal Now
  - Hogan Stand
- Donegal v St Mary's
  - Donegal Now
  - Hogan Stand
  - Independent

=== Section B ===
Qualified for next round

Team	Pld	W	D	L	F	A	Diff	Pts
Down	2	2	0	0	3–22	1-22	6	4
Cavan	2	1	0	1	3–21	2-22	2	2
Armagh	2	0	0	2	2–21	5-21	-8	0

=== Section C ===
Qualified for next round

Team	Pld	W	D	L	F	A	Diff	Pts
Tyrone	3	3	0	0	4-45	1-34	20	6
Derry	3	1	0	1	2-42	2-33	9	3
Antrim	3	1	0	1	3-38	5-35	-3	3
UUJ	3	0	0	3	2-24	3-47	-26	0

=== Later rounds ===
The semi-finals were contested by Monaghan, Fermanagh, Down and Tyrone. Monaghan defeated Down, while Tyrone defeated Fermanagh.

Tyrone beat Monaghan in the final, held at Armagh's Athletic Grounds on 26 January 2013. Ronan McNally was shown a straight red card on the stroke of half-time.

Semi-finals		Final
Monaghan	1-12
Down	0-13	Monaghan	1-10
Tyrone	2-09	Tyrone	4-11
Fermanagh	0-07

== See also ==
- 2013 O'Byrne Cup
