= 2005 O'Byrne Cup =

Tournament details
- Province: Leinster
- Year: 2005
- Trophy: O'Byrne Cup

Winners
- Champions: Laois (5th win)
- Manager: Mick O'Dwyer
- Captain: Noel Garvan

Runners-up
- Runners-up: Westmeath
- Manager: Páidí Ó Sé
- Captain: Michael Ennis

The 2005 O'Byrne Cup was a Gaelic football competition played by the teams of Leinster GAA. The competition differs from the Leinster Senior Football Championship as it also features further education colleges. It was won by Laois.

== O'Byrne Cup ==
- In a preliminary round game on 8 December 2004, D.I.T. beat Trinity College (2-8 to 1-8)

First round 27 November & 12 December 2004; 2 January 2005
Laois	2-11
Offaly	1-9
Kilkenny	2-11
Athlone IT	1-12
Kildare	2-27
Dundalk IT	0-5
Meath	1-14
Wexford	0-10
Longford	1-10
UCD	0-9
Louth	4-11
DIT	1-9
Dublin	0-10
Wicklow	1-5

Quarter-finals; 8/9 January 2005
Laois	5-22
Kilkenny	0-1
Kildare	2-19
Meath	0-10
Westmeath	2-19
Longford	0-10
Louth	2-7
Dublin	0-9

Semi-finals; 16 January 2005
Laois	2-10
Kildare	2-9
Westmeath	0-12
Louth	1-6

Final; 23 January 2005
Laois	0-17
Westmeath	0-12
