= 2001 O'Byrne Cup =

Gaelic football competition, Leinster, Ireland

Tournament details
- Province: Leinster
- Year: 2001
- Trophy: O'Byrne Cup

Winners
- Champions: Meath (6th win)
- Manager: Seán Boylan
- Captain: Trevor Giles

Runners-up
- Runners-up: Westmeath
- Manager: Luke Dempsey
- Captain: Ger Heavin

The 2001 O'Byrne Cup was a Gaelic football competition played by the county teams of Leinster GAA.

The tournament was a straight knockout, with 10 teams. Kildare and Kilkenny did not compete.

Meath were the winners, defeating Westmeath in the final at Cusack Park, Mullingar.

== Results ==
First round 14 January 2001
Longford	1-14
Laois (AET)	1-19
Wicklow	2-15
Carlow	0-5

Quarter-finals; 21/28 January 2001
Meath	3-13
Laois	3-8
Wexford (replayed)	0-7; 1-16
Offaly	1-4; 4-6
Wicklow	1-14
Dublin	1-12
Westmeath	1-19
Louth	4-7

Semi-finals; 4/18 February 2001
Meath	2-17
Wexford	1-7
Wicklow	0-5
Westmeath	3-12

Final; 1 April 2001
Meath	1-11
Westmeath	0-11
