= 2013 O'Byrne Cup =

Tournament details
- Province: Leinster
- Year: 2013
- Trophy: O'Byrne Cup

Winners
- Champions: Kildare (9th win)

The 2013 O'Byrne Cup is a Gaelic football competition played by the teams of Leinster GAA. The competition differs from the Leinster Senior Football Championship as it also features further education colleges and the winning team does not progress to another tournament at All-Ireland level. The O'Byrne Cup began on 6 January 2013 and was competed on a round robin basis, the top team in each group qualifying for the semi-finals. Kildare were the winners.

== Group A ==
Table	P	W	D	L	F	A	+/-	Pts
Louth	3	2	1	0	52	36	16	5
Meath	3	2	1	0	39	36	3	5
Longford	3	1	0	2	36	46	-10	2
UCD	3	0	0	3	45	54	-9	0

Round 1	Meath	1-09 - 1-07	Longford	Ballymahon; Referee: P Kneel (Louth).
Round 1	D Carroll 1-0 pen, S Crosbie J Queeney, M Newman 0-2 each, C Rowe, P Gilsenan, P Byrne 0-1 each.	Report	D McElligott 1-1, S McCormack 0-4f, F McGee, JJ Matthews 0-1 each.	Ballymahon; Referee: P Kneel (Louth).

Round 1	Louth	2-15 - 1-13	UCD	Drogheda; Referee: J Curley (Meath).
Round 1	D Clarke 1-7 (5f), J McEneaney 1-2 (1f), D Reid 0-3, A McDonnell 0-2, R Carroll 0-1.	Report	N Kilroy 1-2, J Heslin 0-4 (1f), D Kingston (1f), P Cahalane (2f) 0-2 each, R Basquel, P Reilly, D Brake 0-1 each.	Drogheda; Referee: J Curley (Meath).

Round 2	Meath	1-08 - 0-11	Louth	Páirc Tailteann; Referee: F Kelly (Longford)
Round 2	P Gilsenan 1-0; S Crosby, D Carroll, S Curran 0-2 each, P O'Rourke (45), J Sheridan 0-1 each.	Report	S Lennon 0-4, 3fs, J Califf 0-2, 1 45, P Keenan, E O'Connor, B White, A McDonnell, J McEneaney 0-1 each.	Páirc Tailteann; Referee: F Kelly (Longford)

Round 2	Longford	1-14 - 0-14	UCD	Emmet Park, Killoe; Referee: N Ward (Westmeath).
Round 2	F McGee (2f), R Smyth 0-4 each, A Rowan 1-0, P McCormack, D McElligott 0-2 each, C P Smyth, E Dalton 0-1 each.	Report	D Kingston 0-6 (2f), N Murray, D Larkin 0-2 each, N Kilroy, J Heslin, C Lenehan, P Cahillane (f) 0-1 each.	Emmet Park, Killoe; Referee: N Ward (Westmeath).

Meath	1-13 - 0-15	UCD	Páirc Tailteann; Referee: D Fahy (Longford).
B Farrell 0-5 (3f), D Carroll 1-0, B Meade, D McNamara 0-2 each, S Tobin, M Collins, S Crosby, G Reilly 0-1 each.	Report	D Kingston 0-6 (3f), K McLoughlin, K Dyas, P Cahilane (1f) 0-2 each, N Kilroy, D Larkin, C Downey 0-1 each.	Páirc Tailteann; Referee: D Fahy (Longford).

Round 3	Louth	1-17 - 0-09	Longford	Drogheda; Referee: D Gough (Meath).
Round 3	A McDonnell 0-5, S Lennon 1-1, J Califf 0-4 (2f), D Reid 0-3, D Clarke 0-2 (1f), C Rafferty, R Carroll 0-1 each.	Report	F McGee 0-4 (3f), D McElligott 0-3 (1f), J Keegan, B McKeon 0-1 each.	Drogheda; Referee: D Gough (Meath).

== Group B ==
Table	P	W	D	L	F	A	+/-	Pts
Dublin	3	2	0	1	57	43	14	4
Wicklow	3	1	1	1	38	37	1	3
DCU	3	1	1	1	46	48	-2	3
Carlow	3	1	0	2	35	48	-13	2

January 06, 2013; Group Stages	Carlow	1-12 3-13	Dublin	Carlow; Attendance: 1,500 (approx); Referee: F Barry (Kildare)
January 06, 2013; Group Stages	D St Ledger 1-1, Brian Murphy (0-2f), D Foley (0-4f) 0-4 each, E Ruth 0-2, Brendan Murphy 0-1.	Report	R McCarthy, D Connolly 1-2 each, B Brogan 0-4 (0-2f), P Quinn 1-0, P Andrews 0-2, D O’Mahony, K McManamon, G Sweeney 0-1 each.	Carlow; Attendance: 1,500 (approx); Referee: F Barry (Kildare)

January 06, 2013; Round 1	Wicklow	1-12 2-9	DCU	Aughrim; Referee: J Hickey.
January 06, 2013; Round 1	J Stafford (0-1), A McLoughlin (0-2); D Healy (0-2), R Finn (0-1), M Byrne (0-5), B McCrea (1-1).	Report	M Quinn (0-1), P Dooney (0-1); D Smith (0-3), J McCarron (1-2), J Brady (1-1), B Donnelly (0-1).	Aughrim; Referee: J Hickey.

January 09, 2013; Group Stages	Dublin	3-16 - 1-11	DCU	Parnell Park; Attendance: 2,000. Referee: D Fahy (Longford).
January 09, 2013; Group Stages	D Connolly 1-3 (1-0 pen, 0-1f, 0-1 ‘45’), P Hudson (0-1f), B Brogan (0-2f) 0-4 each, D Bastick, K McManamon 1-0 each, P Andrews, R McCarthy (0-2f) 0-2 each, G Sweeney 0-1.	Report	D Rock 0-6 (0-2f, 0-1pen), M Quinn 1-0, M McCarthy, J McCarron (0-1f), P Flynn, D Smith, S Carey 0-1 each.	Parnell Park; Attendance: 2,000. Referee: D Fahy (Longford).

January 09, 2013; Round 2	Wicklow	0-09 - 0-12	Carlow	Wicklow Venue; Referee: B Cawley (Kildare).
January 09, 2013; Round 2	M Byrne 0-4, James Sheerin 0-2, A O'Malley, E Keogh, M Doyle 0-1 each.	Report	Brian Murphy 0-3, D St Ledger, W Minchin, D Foley 0-2 each, E Ruth, A Kelly, Brendan Murphy 0-1 each.	Wicklow Venue; Referee: B Cawley (Kildare).

January 13, 2013; Round 3	Carlow	0-08 - 3-08	DCU	Dr. Cullen Park; Referee: S Johnson (Meath)
January 13, 2013; Round 3	W Minchin, D Foley (2f) 0-3 each, E Ruth 0-2.	Report	J McCarron 1-3 (0-2f), C McGreanor 1-1, P Flynn 0-3, D Smyth 1-0, B Donnelly 0-1.	Dr. Cullen Park; Referee: S Johnson (Meath)

January 13, 2013; Round 3	Dublin	0-10 - 1-11	Wicklow	Parnell Park; Attendance: 1,000 (Approx.); Referee: P Kneel (Louth).
January 13, 2013; Round 3	P Hudson 0-4 (0-2f), D OMahony 0-2, R McCarthy, G Sweeney, P Andrews, D Connolly 0-1 each.	Report	P Earls 1-2, A OMalley 0-4 (0-2f), A McLoughlin 0-2, D Healy, B McCrea, R Finn 0-1 each.	Parnell Park; Attendance: 1,000 (Approx.); Referee: P Kneel (Louth).

== Group C ==
Table	P	W	D	L	F	A	+/-	Pts
Offaly	3	3	0	0	42	27	15	6
Laois	3	2	0	1	53	39	14	4
Westmeath	3	1	0	2	44	39	5	2
Athlone IT	3	0	0	3	38	72	-34	0

Round 1	Westmeath	1-22 - 0-13	Athlone IT	Moate; Referee: F Kelly (Longford).
Round 1	Denis Glennon 1-6, Dessie Dolan 0-6 (6f), C McCormack 0-5, R Foley 0-2, P Bannon, D Mullen, C Curley 0-1 each.	Report	G Egan 0-6 (5f), E Carberry (1 '45'), E Kerins, L Murphy, C Shine, A Coffey, F Burke, J Mulligan 0-1 each.	Moate; Referee: F Kelly (Longford).

Offaly	1-11 - 0-08	Laois	O'Connor Park; Attendance: 1700
Niall McNamee 0-8 (2f), P McPadden 1-1, D Hanlon, M Mitchell 0-1 each.	Report	MJ Tierney 0-6 (4f, 1 '45'), D Murphy 1-0, P Begley, R Munnelly 0-1 each.	O'Connor Park; Attendance: 1700

Offaly	3-11 - 1-09	Athlone IT	Gracefield
Niall McNamee 0-6 (3f), B Connor, P Cunningham 1-1 each, E Carroll 1-0, A Sullivan, M Mitchell, A McNamee 0-1 each.	Report	G Egan (3f), F Burke 0-3 each, C O'Brien 1-0, K Martin (1f), C Shine, C Duggan 0-1 each.	Gracefield

Laois	2-12 - 0-12	Westmeath	O'Moore Park
P Clancy 2-3, MJ Tierney 0-4 (3f, 1 '45'), R Munnelly 0-2 (1f), J O'Loughlin, C Begley, C Healy 0-1 each.	Report	C Curley 0-4 (2f), K Reilly 0-3 (2f), D McCormack 0-2, D Corroon, P Bannon (1f), P Sheridan 0-1 each.	O'Moore Park

Offaly	0-08 - 0-07	Westmeath	Cusack Park; Referee: P Maguire (Longford).
N McNamee (1f), R Brady (2f) 0-2 each, A McNamee, D Hanlon, G Guilfoyle, P McPadden 0-1 each.	Report	Dessie Dolan (1f), P Bannon, P Sharry (1 '45) 0-2 each, Denis Glennon (f) 0-1.	Cusack Park; Referee: P Maguire (Longford).

Laois	2-21 - 0-13	Athlone IT	Portarlington; Referee: G McCormack (Dublin).
C Kelly 0-9 (5f), G Walsh 1-4 (0-2f), M Timmons 1-0, D Strong, D Murphy, B Sheehan 0-2 each, J O'Loughlin, E Malone 0-1 each.	Report	F Burke 0-4 (2f), D Queeney 0-3 (1f, 1 45), C Shine 0-2 (1f), A Coffey, P Masterson, J Dolan, A Caul 0-1 each.	Portarlington; Referee: G McCormack (Dublin).

== Group D ==
Table	P	W	D	L	F	A	+/-	Pts
Kildare	3	3	0	0	44	29	15	6
DIT	3	2	0	1	41	39	2	4
Carlow IT	3	1	0	2	32	41	-9	2
Wexford	3	0	0	3	38	46	-8	0

Round 1	Kildare	1-13 - 0-07	Carlow IT	Newbridge; Referee: D Gough (Meath).
Round 1	M Conway, R Sweeney 0-3 (2fs) each, R Kelly 1-0, C McNally 0-2, O Lyons, T O’Connor, P Brophy, P O’Neill, B Flanagan 0-1 each.	Report	B Brosnan 0-3fs, A Forde 0-2, F Conway, J Farrell 0-1 each.	Newbridge; Referee: D Gough (Meath).

Round 1	DIT	1-15 - 1-11	Wexford	Kilanerin; Referee: B Cawley (Kildare).
Round 1	M Collins 1-3 (1-0pen, 0-2f), J Doherty 0-7 (4f), B Menton, A Nestor (1 '45'), C Reddin, B Allen, Conor Walsh 0-1 each.	Report	PJ Banville 1-7 (0-5f), A Flynn 0-3 (1f), J Kelly 0-1.	Kilanerin; Referee: B Cawley (Kildare).

Carlow IT	0-12 - 0-10	Wexford	Bunclody; Referee: G Whelan (Wicklow)
B Brosnan, D Mulhall 0-3f each, A Forde, F Conway, S Gannon, B Hurley, C Reynolds, D Hayden 0-1 each.	Report	A Flynn 0-4f, K O'Grady (2f), P Byrne 0-3 each.	Bunclody; Referee: G Whelan (Wicklow)

Kildare	0-12 - 0-08	DIT	Athy; Referee: J Hickey (Carlow).
M Conway 0-3 (2f), C McNally, J Doyle (2f) 0-2 each, D Flynn, P Kelly, E Bolton, P O'Neill, T O'Connor 0-1 each.	Report	M Collins 0-3 (2f), B Allen 0-2, J McGrath, R Sheridan, R Hazley 0-1 each.	Athy; Referee: J Hickey (Carlow).

DIT	0-15 - 1-10	Carlow IT	IT Carlow Grounds; Referee: S Johnson (Meath).
J Doherty 0-4 (2f), C Reddin 0-3, J McGrath, S O'Connor, R Sheridan 0-2 each, O McGinty, R Hazley 0-1 each.	Report	S Gannon 0-5 (3f), D Mulhall 0-3 (2f), J Doyle 1-0, C Reynolds 0-2.	IT Carlow Grounds; Referee: S Johnson (Meath).

Kildare	1-13 - 1-11	Wexford	Newbridge; Referee: M Deegan (Laois).
J Doyle 0-7 (3f), M Conway 0-3 (2f, 1 '45'), M O'Flaherty 1-0, C McNally 0-2, E Bolton 0-1.	Report	S Roche 1-3 (0-2f), P J Banville 0-3 (2f), R Barry 0-2 (2f), K Gore, A Masterson, C Doyle 0-1 each.	Newbridge; Referee: M Deegan (Laois).

== Finals ==
Semi-Final	Dublin	4-15 - 0-10	Louth	Drogheda; Attendance: 1,500; Referee: A Nolan (Wicklow).
Semi-Final	B Brogan 2-7 (0-6f), E O Conghaile 1-1, P Hudson 1-0, J McCaffrey 0-2, S Cluxton (0-1 ‘45’), P Andrews, P Quinn, D Connolly, C Costello 0-1 each.	Report	J McEneaney 0-5 (0-4f), D Reid 0-2, C Rafferty, S McCann, D O’Connor 0-1 each.	Drogheda; Attendance: 1,500; Referee: A Nolan (Wicklow).

Semi-Final	Kildare	1-12 - 1-09	Offaly	Tullamore; Referee: J Curley (Meath)
Semi-Final	S Johnston 0-7 (4f), M Conway 1-0 (pen), E O'Flaherty 0-2, C McNally, E Bolton, P O'Neill 0-1 each.	Report	N McNamee 0-5 (4f), E Carroll 1-0, R Brady (f), A Sullivan, D Kelly, P Cunningham 0-1 each.	Tullamore; Referee: J Curley (Meath)

January 26, 2012; Final	Dublin	0-17 - 1-16 (aet)	Kildare	Parnell Park; Attendance: 6,000 (approx). Referee: E Kinsella (Laois).
January 26, 2012; Final	P Mannion 0-4 (0-2f), MD Macauley, P Andrews, C Costello, P Hudson (0-1f) 0-2 each, K McManamon, P Quinn, B Brogan (0-1f), S Carthy, P Burke 0-1 each.	Report	J Doyle 0-5 (0-2f), T O’Connor 1-2, P Brophy 0-3, N Kelly 0-2, E O’Flaherty, E Bolton, H McGrillen, P O’Neill 0-1 each.	Parnell Park; Attendance: 6,000 (approx). Referee: E Kinsella (Laois).

== See also ==
- 2013 Dr McKenna Cup
