= 2004 O'Byrne Cup =

Tournament details
- Province: Leinster
- Year: 2004
- Trophy: O'Byrne Cup

Winners
- Champions: Meath (7th win)
- Manager: Seán Boylan
- Captain: Ray Magee

Runners-up
- Runners-up: Westmeath
- Manager: Páidí Ó Sé

The 2004 O'Byrne Cup was a Gaelic football competition played by the teams of Leinster GAA, as well as one college team.

== O'Byrne Cup ==
* = after extra time

First round 4 January 2004
Westmeath	1-16*
Louth	1-12
Carlow	2-9*
Wicklow	0-12
Laois	0-6
Longford	6-8
Offaly	3-11
Wexford	2-11
Kilkenny	1-8
DIT	2-12

Quarter-finals; 11 January 2004
Westmeath	1-12
Kildare	1-4
Carlow	2-8
Dublin	0-13
Longford	0-6
Meath	0-13
Offaly	1-10
DIT	1-5

Semi-finals; 18 January 2004
Westmeath	0-16
Carlow	2-9
Meath	2-9
Offaly	0-10

Final; 25 January 2004
Westmeath	0-11
Meath	2-6
