= 2006 O'Byrne Cup =

Tournament details
- Province: Leinster
- Year: 2006
- Trophy: O'Byrne Cup

Winners
- Champions: Meath (8th win)
- Manager: Eamonn Barry
- Captain: Nigel Crawford

Runners-up
- Runners-up: Offaly
- Manager: Kevin Kilmurray

The 2006 O'Byrne Cup was a Gaelic football competition played by the teams of Leinster GAA. The competition differs from the Leinster Senior Football Championship as it also features further education colleges.

== O'Byrne Cup ==
First round 17 December 2005, 5/8/11 January 2006
Laois	2-13
Athlone I.T.	1-9
Kildare	0-14
Longford	1-5
Louth	3-14
DIT	1-10
Offaly	0-25
Kilkenny	0-2
Dublin	2-15
UCD	2-7
Wexford	1-10
Wicklow	1-7
Meath	1-13
DCU	1-10
Westmeath	1-16
Carlow	1-7

Quarter-finals; 15 January 2006
Laois	3-9
Kildare	0-13
Louth	1-6
Offaly	1-10
Dublin	0-13
Wexford	1-8
Meath	0-18
Westmeath	1-11

Semi-finals; 22 January 2006
Laois	0-10
Offaly	0-15
Dublin	1-11
Meath	0-16

Final; 29 January 2006
Offaly	0-14
Meath	3-14

== O'Byrne Shield ==
Won by Longford, who defeated Wicklow in the final.
