= 1980 O'Byrne Cup =

Gaelic football competition, Leinster, Ireland

Tournament details
- Province: Leinster
- Year: 1980
- Trophy: O'Byrne Cup
- Date: 9 March — 4 May
- Teams: 12

Winners
- Champions: Louth (2nd win)
- Manager: Frank Lynch
- Captain: Michael McCabe

Runners-up
- Runners-up: Dublin
- Manager: Kevin Heffernan

The 1980 O'Byrne Cup was a Gaelic football competition contested by the county teams of Leinster GAA. It was the 22nd staging of the competition that was first held in 1954, with the aim of starting a fund for injured footballers. It was reintroduced to the GAA calendar in 1980 after not being held since 1978.

Louth won the competition after defeating Dublin in the final, played at St Brigid's Park in Dundalk.

== Format ==
The 12 participating counties were split into three groups, with the best four performing teams qualifying for the semi-final stage.

== Matches ==
=== Group A ===
9 March	Louth	1-11 - 0-05	Westmeath

9 March	Meath	6-09 - 1-09	Longford

23 March	Louth	1-04 - 0-06	Longford

23 March	Meath	3-08 - 3-08	Westmeath

30 March	Louth	2-06 - 1-08	Meath

6 April	Longford	1-11 - 2-05	Westmeath

=== Table ===
Team	Pld	W	D	L	Pts	Status
Louth	3	3	0	0	6	Advance to semi-finals
Meath	3	1	1	0	3	Eliminated
Longford	3	1	0	2	2	Eliminated
Westmeath	3	0	1	2	1	Eliminated

=== Group B ===
9 March	Laois	1-17 - 0-05	Carlow

9 March	Offaly	4-11 - 1-05	Kilkenny

30 March	Laois	5-13 - 1-02	Kilkenny

30 March	Offaly	4-14 - 2-08	Carlow

6 April	Carlow	7-06 - 0-04	Kilkenny

6 April	Offaly	1-10 - 1-06	Laois

=== Table ===
Team	Pld	W	D	L	Pts	Status
Offaly	3	3	0	0	6	Advance to semi-finals
Laois	3	2	0	1	4	Eliminated
Carlow	3	1	0	2	2	Eliminated
Kilkenny	3	0	0	3	0	Eliminated

=== Group C ===
9 March	Wexford	3-08 - 1-05	Kildare

9 March	Dublin	2-08 - 1-04	Wicklow

23 March	Kildare	4-06 - 1-07	Wicklow

6 April	Wicklow	0-16 - 0-05	Wexford

6 April	Kildare	2-06 - 2-04	Dublin

Wexford	scr. - w/o	Dublin

=== Table ===
Team	Pld	W	D	L	Pts	Status
Dublin	3	2	0	1	4	Advance to semi-finals
Kildare	3	2	0	1	4	Advance to semi-finals
Wicklow	3	1	0	2	2	Eliminated
Wexford	3	1	0	2	2	Eliminated

=== Semi-Finals ===
19 April	Dublin	1-13 - 0-08	Kildare	Parnell Park

20 April	Louth	0-14 - 0-11	Offaly	O'Connor Park

=== Final ===
4 May

Louth	0-08 - 1-04	Dublin
Lennon 0-3, Dawe 0-2, McDermott 0-1, Jimmy McDonnell 0-1, O'Kane 0-1		Ronayne 1-0, Quinn 0-2, Davis 0-1, Doyle 0-1

St Brigid's Park, Dundalk
Referee: J. Gunning (Offaly)

GK	1	Gerry Farrell (Cooley Kickhams)
RCB	2	Séamus Haughey (Dundalk Young Irelands)
FB	3	Michael White (Dundalk Gaels)
LCB	4	Frank Taaffe (Oliver Plunketts)
RHB	5	Michael McCabe (Dundalk Young Irelands) (c)
CHB	6	Aidan Wiseman (Clan na Gael)
LHB	7	Gary O'Callaghan (Clan na Gael)
MF	8	Matt McDermott (St Fechin's)
MF	9	Jim Lynch (Kilkerley Emmets)
RHF	10	Jimmy McDonnell (Geraldines)
CHF	11	Denis Kelleher (Dreadnots)
LHF	12	Eugene Judge (Newtown Blues)
RCF	13	Pat Lennon (Kilkerley Emmets)
FF	14	J.P. O'Kane (Kilkerley Emmets)
LCF	15	Kevin Dawe (O'Raghallaighs)
Substitutes:
	16	Johnny McDonnell (St Fechin's) for Dawe

GK	1	Niall Fitzgerald (Na Fianna)
RCB	2	Colm Murphy (St Margaret's)
FB	3	Tommy Drumm (Whitehall Colmcille)
LCB	4	Dave Foran (Crumlin)
RHB	5	Mick Kennedy (St Margaret's)
CHB	6	Gerry Collins (Kilmacud Crokes)
LHB	7	Fran Ryder (St Vincent's)
MF	8	Rupert Davis (O'Dwyer's)
MF	9	Bernard Brogan (St Oliver Plunketts)
RHF	10	Pat Canavan (St Vincent's)
CHF	11	Anton O'Toole (Synge Street)
LHF	12	Jim Ronayne (Clontarf)
RCF	13	Johnny Quinn (Na Fianna)
FF	14	Tony Hanahoe (St Vincent's)
LCF	15	Bobby Doyle (St Vincent's)
Substitutes:
	16	Barney Rock (Ballymun Kickhams) for Murphy
	17	Pádraig Heffernan (Naomh Barróg) for Collins
