= 2015 O'Byrne Cup =

Tournament details
- Province: Leinster
- Year: 2015
- Trophy: O'Byrne Cup

Winners
- Champions: Dublin (8th win)

The 2015 O'Byrne Cup is a Gaelic football competition played by the teams of Leinster GAA. The competition differs from the Leinster Senior Football Championship as it also features further education colleges and the winning team does not progress to another tournament at All-Ireland level. The O'Byrne Cup began on 3 January 2015 and was competed on a round robin basis, the top team in each group qualifying for the semi-finals. Dublin were the winners.

== Group A ==
Table	P	W	D	L	F	A	+/-	Pts
Dublin	3	3	0	0	47	35	12	6
Offaly	3	2	0	1	51	29	22	4
Maynooth	3	1	0	2	29	45	-16	2
Laois	3	0	0	3	33	51	-18	0

4 January 2015; 14:00	Dublin	1-12 - 1-05	Maynooth	Parnell Park; Referee: S Murphy
4 January 2015; 14:00	E O’Gara (1-3), D Rock (0-5), E O Conghaile, T Brady, S Carthy, D McLoughlin (0-1) each		B Dardis (1-2), M Walsh, B Duggan, N Kennedy (0-1) each	Parnell Park; Referee: S Murphy

4 January 2015; 14:00	Offaly	2-12 - 0-09	Laois	Tullamore; Referee: F Barry
4 January 2015; 14:00	B Allen (1-3), W Mulhall (0-3), N Bracken (1-0), J Moloney, R Allen, G Guilfoyle, N Dunne, J Evans, D Kelly (0-1) each		C Kelly (0-2), J O'Loughlin (0-2), B Ging (0-1), R Munnelly (0-1), G Dillon (0-1), N Murphy (0-1)	Tullamore; Referee: F Barry

7 January 2015; 19:30	Dublin	0-17 - 0-13	Offaly	Parnell Park; Referee: P Maguire
7 January 2015; 19:30	D Rock (0-9), T Brady (0-2), P Ryan (0-2), E O'Conghaile (0-1), N Scully (0-1), E O'Gara (0-1), M Deegan (0-1)		N Dunne (0-4), E Carroll (0-2), B Allen (0-2), D Hogan (0-1), K Mullally (0-1), N Bracken (0-1), J Kavanagh (0-1), W Mulhall (0-1)	Parnell Park; Referee: P Maguire

7 January 2015; 19:30	Laois	1-07 - 0-18	Maynooth	Portarlington; Referee: N Ward
7 January 2015; 19:30	R Munnelly (1-5), C Kelly (0-2)		B Dardis (0-4), N Walsh (0-4), N Kennedy (0-3), P Lynch (0-2), D Hyland (0-1), E Lowndes (0-1), D Duke (0-1), G Hannigan (0-1), J Gonoud (0-1)	Portarlington; Referee: N Ward

11 January 2015; 14:00	Laois	1-11 - 1-12	Dublin	Portarlington; Referee: C Reilly
11 January 2015; 14:00	D Kingston (0-7), B Quigley (1-0), P McEvoy (0-1), J O'Loughlin (0-1), M O'Halloran (0-1), C Kelly (0-1)		D Rock (0-6), K McManamon (1-1), E O'Conghaile (0-3), T Brady (0-1), C Costello (0-1)	Portarlington; Referee: C Reilly

11 January 2015; 14:00	Offally	1-17 - 0-03	Maynooth	Tullamore; Referee: D Fahy
11 January 2015; 14:00	W Mulhall (1-5), B Allen (0-6), D Hogan (0-2), M Young (0-1), N Bracken (0-1), K Mullally (0-1), G Guilfoyle (0-1)		C Slevin (0-2), M McCarville (0-1)	Tullamore; Referee: D Fahy

== Group B ==
Table	P	W	D	L	F	A	+/-	Pts
Kildare	3	3	0	0	53	27	26	6
UCD	3	2	0	1	40	48	-8	4
Carlow	3	1	0	2	44	46	-2	2
Louth	3	0	0	3	34	50	-16	0

4 January 2015; 14:00	Kildare	1-16 - 0-07	Louth	Newbridge; Referee: F Smith
4 January 2015; 14:00	D Mulhall (0-8), T O'Connor (1-1), P Kelly (0-1), P O'Neill (0-1), H Lynch (0-1), E Callaghan (0-1), E O'Flaherty (0-1), F Dowling (0-1), E Murphy (0-1)		R Burns (0-3), R Holcroft (0-3), D Byrne (0-1)	Newbridge; Referee: F Smith

4 January 2015; 14:00	Carlow	1-12 - 0-18	UCD	Carlow; Referee: N McKenna
4 January 2015; 14:00	P Broderick (0-5), H Gahan (1-0), C Moran (0-2), D Hayden (0-1), D Foley (0-1), J Kennedy (0-1), E McCormack (0-1), E Ruth (0-1)		J Heslin (0-8), B Fenton (0-3), N Kelly (0-2), R Basquel (0-2), T Moolick (0-1), R Carr (0-1), J McEntee (0-1)	Carlow; Referee: N McKenna

7 January 2015; 19:30	Kildare	2-07 - 1-09	Carlow	Athy; Referee: S Johnston
7 January 2015; 19:30	P Fogarty (2-2), D Mulhall (0-3), P O'Neill (0-1), D Whyte (0-1)		P Broderick (0-4), E Bambrick (1-0), E Finnegan (0-2), D Foley (0-2), D St Ledger (0-1)	Athy; Referee: S Johnston

7 January 2015; 20:00	Louth	0-12 - 2-08	UCD	Haggardstown; Referee: D Moore
7 January 2015; 20:00	R Holcroft (0-4), R Burns (0-2), H McGinn (0-1), R Moore (0-1), D Byrne (0-1), R Brodigan (0-1), D Maguire (0-1), A Williams (0-1)		T Moolick (1-0), E O'Byrne (1-0), R Basquel (0-2), R Carr (0-2), C Sheridan (0-1), C Ellis (0-1), S Kilcoyne (0-1), A Jordan (0-1)	Haggardstown; Referee: D Moore

11 January 2015; 14:00	Kildare	0-21 - 1-05	UCD	Newbridge; Referee: D Maher
11 January 2015; 14:00	D Mulhall (0-9), F Dowling (0-4), E O'Flaherty (0-3), P Fogarty (0-2), H Lynch (0-1), E Callaghan (0-1), T O'Connor (0-1)		C Sheridan (1-0), N Kelly (0-3), R Basquel (0-2)	Newbridge; Referee: D Maher

11 January 2015; 14:15	Carlow	3-08 - 1-12	Louth	Carlow; Referee: E Kinsella
11 January 2015; 14:15	S Gannon (1-1), P Broderick (0-3), K Toner (1-0 og), H Gahan (1-0), J Murphy (0-2), D Bambrick (0-1), D O'Brien (0-1)		D O'Connor (0-3), R Holcroft (0-3), S McCann (1-0), D Byrne (0-2), R Moore (0-2), R Burns (0-1), T Durnin (0-1)	Carlow; Referee: E Kinsella

== Group C ==
Table	P	W	D	L	F	A	+/-	Pts
Meath	3	2	1	0	53	39	14	5
Westmeath	3	2	0	1	47	45	2	4
DCU	3	1	1	1	58	48	10	3
Longford	3	0	0	3	33	56	-23	0

3 January 2015; 14:30	Longford	0-11 - 3-13	DCU	Longford; Referee: M Deegan
3 January 2015; 14:30	F McGee (0-6), P McKeon (0-3), S McCormack (0-1), D Masterson (0-1)		E Smith (1-2), C McGraynor (1-0), E Keane (1-0), C Meredith (0-2), D Smith (0-2), R Connor (0-2), C McHugh (0-2), D Ward (0-1), G Kelly (0-1), N Murphy (0-1)	Longford; Referee: M Deegan

4 January 2015; 14:00	Westmeath	0-10 - 1-13	Meath	Mullingar; Referee: B Cawley
4 January 2015; 14:00	G Egan (0-4), S Dempsey (0-2), D Lynch (0-1), K Martin (0-1), C McCormack (0-1), A Coffey (0-1)		G Reilly (0-6), D Carroll (0-3), D Bray (1-0), B Menton (0-2), S Tobin (0-1), J Queeney (0-1)	Mullingar; Referee: B Cawley

7 January 2015; 19:30	Meath	1-17 - 1-09	Longford	Navan; Referee: J Hickey
7 January 2015; 19:30	R O'Dowd (0-4), J Queeney (0-3), S Tobin (1-0), B Menton (0-2), A Tormey (0-2), M O'Sullivan (0-2), J Wallace (0-2), D Toner (0-1), D Bray (0-1)		B Kavanagh (0-3), F Magee (1-0), S McCormack (0-2), B Gilleran (0-1), R McEntire (0-1), A Rowan (0-1), P McKeon (0-1)	Navan; Referee: J Hickey

7 January 2015; 19:30	Westmeath	3-11 - 2-13	DCU	Kinnegad; Referee: A Nolan
7 January 2015; 19:30	R Connellan (0-7), G Egan (1-4), J Dolan (1-0), L Smyth (1-0),		C McHugh (0-8), C McNally (1-1), D Byrne (1-0), R Connor (0-2), M Quinn (0-1), N Murphy (0-1)	Kinnegad; Referee: A Nolan

10 January 2015; 19:00	Meath	1-14 - 1-14	DCU	Navan; Referee: S Johnson
10 January 2015; 19:00	D Bray (1-2), M O'Sullivan (0-5), G Reilly (0-3), D Tobin (0-1), J Wallace (0-1), N Judge (0-1), B Menton (0-1)		C McHugh (0-7), C McGraynor (1-0), D Byrne (0-2), T Flynn (0-1), E O'Connor (0-1), D O'Connor (0-1), N Murphy (0-1), D Smith (0-1)	Navan; Referee: S Johnson

11 January 2015; 14:00	Longford	0-10 - 2-11	Westmeath	Ballymahon; Referee: J Gough
11 January 2015; 14:00	B Kavanagh (0-4), P McKeon (0-4), E Williams (0-1), B Gilleran (0-1)		L Smyth (1-4), K Martin (1-1), A Coffey (0-2), G Egan (0-2), D Dolan (0-1), D Glennon (0-1)	Ballymahon; Referee: J Gough

== Group D ==
Table	P	W	D	L	F	A	+/-	Pts
DIT	3	3	0	0	49	41	8	6
Wexford	3	2	0	1	51	45	6	4
Wicklow	3	1	0	2	52	55	-3	2
Carlow IT	3	0	0	3	40	51	-11	0

4 January 2015; 14:00	Wexford	0-14 - 1-12	DIT	Gorey; Referee: K Kelly
4 January 2015; 14:00	P Byrne (0-4), B Brosnan (0-4), D Murphy (0-3), T Rossiter (0-1), K O'Grady (0-1), N Harney (0-1)		C Madden (0-6), P Brogan (1-1), C Grimes (0-2), D O'Reilly (0-2), C Reddin (0-1)	Gorey; Referee: K Kelly

4 January 2015; 14:00	Wicklow	2-14 - 2-09	Carlow IT	Blessington; Referee: D Moore
4 January 2015; 14:00	J McGrath (0-6), C Lawlor (2-0 ogs), D Healy (0-2), T Kelly (0-2), C Murphy (0-1), P McLoughlin (0-1), D Woods (0-1), D Odlum (0-1)		B McHugh (2-4), T Sheil (0-3), B Murphy (0-1), W Young (0-1)	Blessington; Referee: D Moore

7 January 2015; 19:30	Wexford	1-13 - 0-13	Carlow IT	Enniscorthy; Referee: G McCormack
7 January 2015; 19:30	D Flood (1-2), B Brosnan (0-4), N Hughes (0-2), D Murphy (0-2), K O'Grady (0-1), K Rowe (0-1), K O'Connor (0-1)		L Boland (0-4), T Nolan (0-3), B McHugh (0-2), T Sheil (0-2), A Forde (0-1), B Murphy (0-1)	Enniscorthy; Referee: G McCormack

7 January 2015; 19:30	Wicklow	1-12 - 3-10	DIT	Bray; Referee: B Tiernan
7 January 2015; 19:30	J McGrath (1-5), R O'Brien (0-3), B McCrea (0-2), A McLoughlin (0-1), D Odlum (0-1)		C Madden (2-2), C Grimes (1-2), D O'Reilly (0-1), G O'Reilly (0-1), C Compton (0-1), P Brogan (0-1), D McGuinness (0-1), C Lynn (0-1)	Bray; Referee: B Tiernan

11 January 2015; 14:00	Wexford	2-15 - 2-11	Wicklow	Gorey; Referee: R Malone
11 January 2015; 14:00	D Murphy (1-2), P Barden (1-2), K O'Grady (0-4), B Brosnan (0-3), D Flood (0-2), P Byrne (0-1), C Kehoe (0-1)		D Hayden (1-3), C Foley (1-2), M Kenny (0-2), M Mangan (0-1), T Kelly (0-1), P McLoughlin (0-1), J McGrath (0-1)	Gorey; Referee: R Malone

11 January 2015; 14:00	Carlow IT	1-09 - 1-12	DIT	Carlow IT; Referee: D Fedigan
11 January 2015; 14:00	C Healy (1-1), L Boland (0-3), B Murphy (0-2), R O'Brien (0-1), T Dever (0-1), B McHugh (0-1)		P Brogan (1-2), B McMahon (0-3), C Madden (0-2), D O'Reilly (0-1), G O'Reilly (0-1), C Grimes (0-1), C Lynn (0-1), C Reddin (0-1)	Carlow IT; Referee: D Fedigan

== Semi-finals ==
18 January 2015; 14:00	Meath	1-13 - 1-15	Dublin	Navan; Referee: A Nolan
18 January 2015; 14:00	M Newman (1-1), S Tobin (0-3), P O'Rourke (0-3), B Menton (0-2), G Reilly (0-2), J Queeney (0-1), M Burke (0-1)		D Rock (0-8), E O'Gara (1-2), S Carthy (0-2), E O Conghaile (0-1), K McManamon (0-1), P Ryan (0-1)	Navan; Referee: A Nolan

18 January 2015; 14:00	Kildare	2-15 - 0-09	DIT	Newbridge; Referee: D Gough
18 January 2015; 14:00	E O'Flaherty (1-4), P Fogarty (0-4), S Hanafin (1-0), E Murphy (0-2), F Dowling (0-2), G White (0-1), H Lynch (0-1), G Farrell (0-1)		C Madden (0-6), P Brogan (0-1), C Ferris (0-1), S Dowling (0-1)	Newbridge; Referee: D Gough

== Final ==
25 January 2015; 14:00	Kildare	0-19 - 0-24 AET	Dublin	Newbridge; Referee: D Gough
25 January 2015; 14:00	D Mulhall (0-7), E Callaghan (0-3), P Fogarty (0-3), E Murphy (0-2), E O'Neill (0-2), F Dowling (0-1), G White (0-1)	Report	D Rock (0-10), K McManamon (0-4), T Brady (0-3), E O'Gara (0-2), S Carthy (0-2), C Costello (0-1), J Cooper (0-1), E Culligan (0-1)	Newbridge; Referee: D Gough
