= Nicky Malone =

Irish Gaelic footballer

Sport
- Sport: Gaelic football
- Position: Defender
Club
- Years: Club
- Lann Léire
Inter-county
- Years: County
- Louth

Nicky Malone is an Irish Gaelic football manager and former player as a defender for Lann Léire and the Louth county team.

Malone was Louth captain in 2000 and 2001. He captained Louth to the 1999–2000 National League Division 2 title in May 2000, despite having been sent off against Laois in the semi-final (his two-week period of suspension expired before the final against Offaly). He has managed Lann Léire twice.
