= Tom Coffey =

British physician

Dr Thomas Antony Coffey OBE is the Senior Advisor to the Mayor of London on Health Policy.

He works with the Mayor’s Statutory Health Adviser. He was formerly associate medical director of primary care in London.

He was appointed in 2016. He is also NHS England London clinical director of emergency care. He has been a general practitioner at Brocklebank Health Centre in Wandsworth since 1994. He also works at A&E in Charing Cross Hospital.

He was an advocate of Polyclinics in England in 2008. He has a particular interest in patients with learning difficulties.

He was awarded the OBE for services to healthcare in the 2009 Birthday Honours.
