= Kieran Lillis =

Irish Gaelic footballer

Personal information
- Native name: Ciarán Ó Laighléis (Irish)
- Born: 17 February 1990 (age 36) Laois, Ireland
- Occupation: Primary Teacher

Sport
- Sport: Gaelic Football
- Position: Midfield
Club
- Years: Club
- 2006-: Portlaoise
Club titles
- Laois titles: 12
Inter-county
- Years: County
- 2009-2024: Laois

Kieran Lillis is a Gaelic footballer from Portlaoise in County Laois.

He usually plays in defence or midfield for the Laois county football team and in 2007 was part of the Laois team that won the Leinster Minor Football Championship.

== Honours ==
Club

- Laois Senior Football Championship (12):2007, 2008, 2009, 2010, 2011, 2012, 2013, 2014, 2015, 2017, 2018, 2019
- Leinster Senior Club Football Championship (1): 2009

County

- Leinster Minor Football Championship (1): 2007
