= 1997 O'Byrne Cup =

Gaelic football competition, Leinster, Ireland

Tournament details
- Province: Leinster
- Year: 1997
- Trophy: O'Byrne Cup
- Date: 12 January — 9 March
- Teams: 12

Winners
- Champions: Offaly (5th win)
- Manager: Tommy Lyons
- Captain: Finbarr Cullen

Runners-up
- Runners-up: Wexford
- Manager: Cyril Hughes

Other
- Matches played: 11

The 1997 O'Byrne Cup was a Gaelic football competition played by the county teams of Leinster GAA.

The tournament was a straight knockout, with 12 teams.

Offaly were the winners, defeating Wexford in the final at O'Connor Park.

== Results ==
First round 12 January 1997
Carlow	1-11
Kilkenny	0-7
Longford	1-5
Offaly	4-21
Wexford	1-10
Wicklow	1-9
Westmeath	1-11
Laois	2-7

Quarter-finals; 19 January 1997
Kildare	3-8
Carlow	1-10
Offaly	2-16
Meath	1-7
Wexford	2-8
Dublin	0-8
Westmeath	1-7
Louth	0-11

Semi-finals; 23 February 1997
Kildare	0-10
Offaly	2-16
Wexford	3-11
Louth	1-8

Final; 9 March 1997
Offaly	4-13
Wexford	0-5
