= Colin Kelly (Gaelic footballer) =

Louth Gaelic footballer

Personal information
- Nickname: Super
- Born: Drogheda, County Louth

Sport
- Sport: Gaelic football
- Position: Left Corner-Forward
Clubs
- Years: Club
- 1983–1987 1988–2001 2002–2009: O'Raghallaighs; Newtown Blues; Dreadnots
Inter-county
- Years: County
- 1989–2002: Louth

Colin Kelly (born 1971) is a Gaelic football manager and former player from Drogheda, County Louth. He made 33 Championship appearances for the Louth senior football team between 1989 and 2002 and is one of the Wee County's leading scorers of all-time.

== Playing career ==
Kelly played for his county as a 16 year-old in the 1987 Leinster Minor Football Championship. At the beginning of the 1988 season, he transferred from the O'Raghallaighs to another Drogheda club, Newtown Blues. That same year he would win his first county senior championship medal, scoring four points for the Blues in a 0–7 to 1–03 defeat of Clan na Gael at Castlebellingham.

In February 1989 against Mayo while still attending secondary school, he made his competitive debut for the county senior team aged 17, in a National League Division 2 match played at St. Brigid's Park, Dowdallshill.

He received the Man of the Match award for his performance in the 2000 Louth SFC Final, when Newtown Blues defeated Stabannon Parnells.

Kelly won his third senior championship medal with the Blues in 2001 with victory over Mattock Rangers. By then resident in Clogherhead, he transferred to the local club Dreadnots for the start of the 2002 season.

== Coaching career ==
After retiring from inter-county football in 2002, Kelly was joint manager of the Louth Under-21s with Colm Nally and Niall O'Donnell for three seasons from 2003 to 2005.

In 2012, he managed the Under-21s to a first Leinster championship final in sixteen years, losing to Dublin.

He later managed the Louth senior team for three years. He led Louth to successive promotions in the National Football League in 2016 and 2017, though Louth did not make any championship impact during his time in charge.

He was appointed Westmeath senior manager on a two-year term in late 2017 but left in mid-2018, citing family commitments.

He was appointed Wicklow senior manager in October 2021. However, he left in March 2022, citing work commitments.

At club level, Kelly was player-manager in 2008 when Dreadnots won the Louth Intermediate Championship.

== Honours ==
=== As player ===
==== Louth ====
- All-Ireland Senior B Football Championship: 1997
- National Football League Division Two: 1996–97
- O'Byrne Cup: 1990

==== Newtown Blues ====
- Louth Senior Football Championship: 1988, 2000, 2001
- ACC Cup: 1997

==== Dreadnots ====
- Louth Intermediate Football Championship: 2004, 2008
- Intermediate Football League: 2004
- Louth Junior 2B Football Championship: 2019

=== As manager ===
==== Louth ====
- National Football League Division 4: 2016
- National Football League Division 3 Runners-Up: 2017

==== Dreadnots ====
- Louth Intermediate Football Championship: 2008

==== O'Raghallaighs ====
- ACC Cup: 2010
- Louth Intermediate Football Championship: 2011
- Intermediate Football League: 2011

Sporting positions
| Preceded by Aidan O'Rourke | Louth Senior Football Manager; 2014–2017 | Succeeded by Pete McGrath |
| Preceded by Tom Cribbin | Westmeath Senior Football Manager; 2017–2018 | Succeeded by Jack Cooney |
| Preceded by Davy Burke | Wicklow Senior Football Manager; 2021–2022 | Succeeded by Alan Costello and Gary Duffy |
