= 2027 O'Byrne Cup =

Gaelic football competition

The 2027 O'Byrne Cup is a Gaelic football competition for county teams in the province of Leinster.

The draw is expected in November 2026, with the competition scheduled to commence in early January. Features expected include penalties to decide matches instead of extra time, any number of substitutions permitted, matches being reduced to 60 minutes, and "a Shield competition" intended to guarantee every team is involved in more than one match. The final is scheduled for mid-late January.

== Competition format ==
The eleven teams are drawn to play in a knockout system. Ten of them play in the first round, while one goes straight to the quarter-final.

Three of the first round winners go into the quarter-finals, and two of them go straight to the semi-finals.

The quarter-finals feature the team that received a bye and three first-round winners. The two quarter-final winners advance to the semi-finals.

The five losers in the first round are transferred to the O'Byrne Shield, which is also a straight knockout. This structure means that every team, except for one, is guaranteed at least two games.

Drawn games go to penalty shootout. Games which cannot be played due to weather conditions are decided by coin toss.
