= Pádraig Nolan =

Kildare Gaelic footballer (born 1964)

Pádraig Nolan (born 1964) is an Irish former Gaelic footballer and manager, who played for the Kildare county team at minor, under-21 and senior level in the late 1980s. He later managed two county teams: Offaly and Kildare. He managed Offaly from 1999 to 2002, and subsequently took charge of Kildare, guiding them to the 2003 Leinster SFC final.

== Early life ==
Nolan is originally from in Kilcock in County Kildare, Ireland. As of his appointment as Kildare manager in 2002, Nolan taught and coached at Naas C.B.S.

== Playing career ==
Nolan represented Kildare at the end of the 1980s, a career which included one historic achievement. He was on the Kildare team which lost to Kilkenny in the O'Byrne Cup.

== Managerial career ==
Nolan coached at St Patrick's Classical School, work which produced several members of the Meath county team. He then succeeded Tommy Lyons as Offaly manager.

Nolan was a comparatively young appointment at 35 to the Offaly job in 1999. His first year in charge saw Offaly dethrone the reigning All-Ireland SFC champions Meath in the Leinster SFC quarter-finals. Kildare knocked Offaly out after a replay in following round. In 2001 Offaly saw off Laois in the Leinster SFC, but narrowly lost to Dublin in the semi-final. With this being the inaugural year of the 'back-door', Offaly had a qualifier game against Louth six days later, but lost that game to a late winning point. 2002 was to prove Nolan's final championship in charge of Offaly. After again edging out neighbours Laois in the opening Leinster SFC fixture, Offaly faced Kildare with a place in the Leinster SFC final at stake. Similarly to 2000, Offaly lost in a replay. As was to prove a trait for Offaly, they failed to make progress through the qualifier system and lost to Limerick in the first qualifier fixture. Nolan stepped down from the post and was succeeded by Paul O'Kelly.

Following on from this, Nolan took charge of Kildare guiding them to the 2003 Leinster SFC final, where Laois defeated his team. Nolan resigned in 2005. He has not managed at inter-county level since.
