= Martin Flanagan (Gaelic footballer) =

Irish Gaelic footballer

Personal information
- Native name: Máirtín Ó Flannagáin (Irish)
- Born: Mullingar, County Westmeath, Ireland
- Height: 1.9 m (6 ft 3 in)

Sport
- Sport: Gaelic football
- Position: Midfield
Club
- Years: Club
- Tyrrellspass
Club titles
- Westmeath titles: 3
Inter-county
- Years: County
- 1995-2010: Westmeath
Inter-county titles
- Leinster titles: 1
- NFL: 3

Martin Flanagan is an Irish former Gaelic footballer from Tyrrellspass, County Westmeath who played for the Westmeath county team from 1995 to 2010.

Flanagan is considered to be one of the finest talents the county has ever produced, but retired without a Leinster medal to his name after falling out of favour with then manager Páidí Ó Sé during the successful 2004 campaign. Equally at home at midfield or full forward, he made his championship debut against Wexford in 1995 and went on to win National Football League Division 2 medals in 2001, 2003 and 2008.

Flanagan played his club football with Tyrrellspass, winning Westmeath Senior Football Championship medals in 1999, 2006 and 2007. He also played in the Leinster Senior Club Football Championship final in 2007 however Tyrrellspass lost out to Dublin side St Vincents

== Honours ==
- Leinster College's Senior A Championship as Captain of St. Mel's College Longford in 1994. (1): 1994
- North Leinster Colleges Senior A League with St. Mel's College Longford (1): 1991
- Leinster Senior Football Championship (1): 2004
- National Football League, Division 2 (3): 2001, 2003, 2008
- Westmeath Senior Football Championship (3): 1999, 2006, 2007
