= O'Byrne Cup =

Annual Gaelic football competition

- Current season or competition: 2027 O'Byrne Cup
- Irish: Corn Uí Bhroin
- Code: Gaelic football
- Founded: 1954; 72 years ago
- Region: Leinster (GAA)
- Trophy: O'Byrne Cup
- No. of teams: 11
- Title holders: Westmeath (5th title)
- Most titles: Kildare (11 titles)
- Sponsors: Dioralyte
- TV partner: TG4
- Official website: https://leinstergaa.ie/competitions/obyrne-cup-s-f-2023/

The O'Byrne Cup is a Gaelic football competition organized by the Leinster GAA and first staged in 1954.

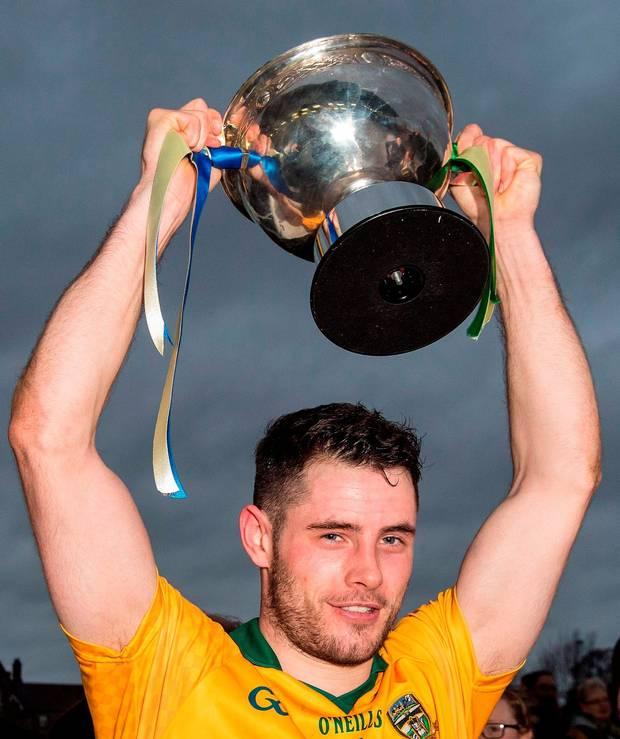
Donal Keogan (Meath) lifts the O'Byrne Cup in 2016

== History ==
The competition is named in honour of Matt Byrne (14 February 1870 – 21 September 1947), a former Wicklow GAA club and county officer. By virtue of a quirk in translation, the Corn Uí Bhroin became known as the O'Byrne Cup even though Matt had never used an 'O' in his surname. Byrne was a native of Baltinglass and taught at the local national school. Deeply involved in GAA activities at all levels throughout his life, he was regarded as a good footballer in his youth and an excellent handballer. He was the first secretary of the Maurice Davins' club in Baltinglass and served as a member of the Wicklow County Board for over 50 years, mostly as registrar. He represented Wicklow on Leinster and Central Councils and served as President of the Irish Handball Council in 1941–44. Byrne died in 1947.

The competition is contested by the eleven Leinster county teams (excluding Kilkenny), although Third-level College teams have taken part occasionally. The competition is, together with the Walsh Cup and Kehoe Cup, part of a Leinster GAA Series which takes place each January. The most recent O'Byrne Cup winners were Westmeath, who beat Kildare in the 2026 final.

The O'Byrne Shield was introduced in 2006 for teams knocked out at the first-round stage of the competition. It was later abandoned in 2013 due to the introduction of group stages in the competition, but re-introduced in 2024 when the O'Byrne Cup reverted to straight knockout format.

In September 2024, GAA delegates voted to remove the O'Byrne Cup from the 2025 fixtures calendar on a one-year trial basis. It returned for 2026.

== Top winners ==
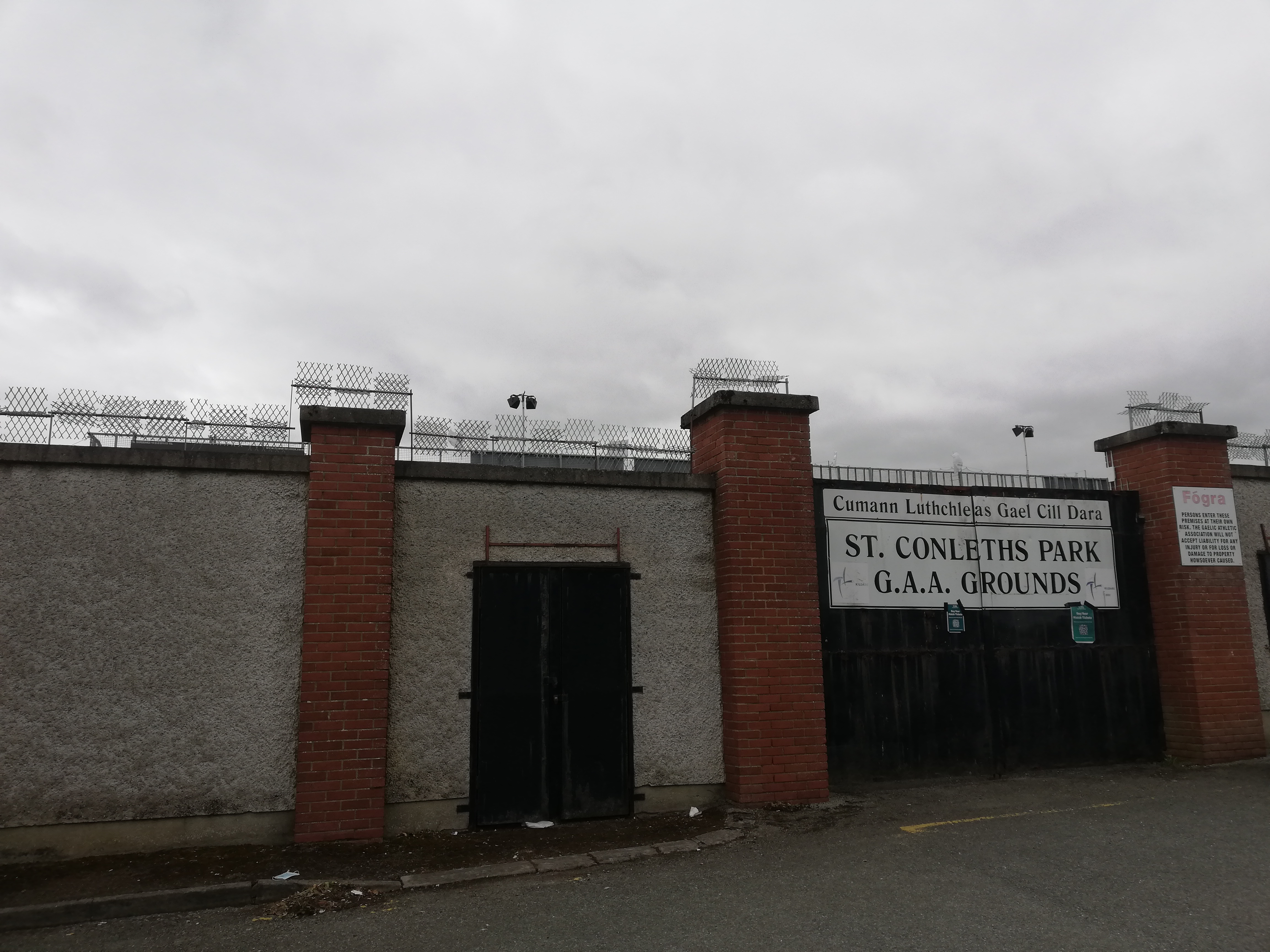
St Conleth's Park (Newbridge, County Kildare) has hosted the most finals — nine.

	Team	Wins	Years won
1	Kildare	11	1962, 1968, 1970, 1973, 1976, 1982, 1989, 2003, 2011, 2013, 2014
2	Dublin	10	1956, 1958, 1960, 1966, 1999, 2007, 2008, 2015, 2017, 2022
2	Meath	10	1967, 1974, 1977, 1983, 1992, 2001, 2004, 2006, 2016, 2018
4	Offaly	6	1954, 1961, 1981, 1993, 1997, 1998
5	Laois	5	1978, 1987, 1991, 1994, 2005
5	Longford	5	1965, 2000, 2020, 2023, 2024
5	Westmeath	5	1959, 1964, 1988, 2019, 2026
8	Louth	4	1963, 1980, 1990, 2009
8	Wicklow	4	1955, 1957, 1986, 1996
10	DCU	2	2010, 2012
11	Carlow	1	2002
11	Wexford	1	1995

== List of finals ==
Year	Winners	Score	Runners-up	Score	Venue
2026	Westmeath	1-18	Kildare	1-16	St Conleth's Park
2025	Not held due to fixture congestion				
2024	Longford	1-15	Dublin	0-9	O'Moore Park
2023	Longford	3-13	Louth	0-12	Pearse Park
2022	Dublin	1-13	Laois	0-11	Dr. Cullen Park
2021	Not held due to COVID-19 pandemic				
2020	Longford	1-12	Offaly	0-11	O'Connor Park
2019	Westmeath	1-12	Dublin	0-10	Parnell Park
2018	Meath	4-13	Westmeath	1-13	Cusack Park, Mullingar
2017	Dublin	2-16	Louth	1-10	Gaelic Grounds, Drogheda
2016	Meath	1-17	Longford	1-11	Páirc Tailteann
2015	Dublin	0-24	Kildare	0-19	St Conleth's Park
2014	Kildare	1-10	Meath	0-9	St Conleth's Park
2013	Kildare	1-16	Dublin	0-17	Parnell Park
2012	DCU	3-7	Kildare	1-12	O'Moore Park
2011	Kildare	3-9	Louth	2-9	St Conleth's Park
2010	DCU	1-15	Louth	0-17	Gaelic Grounds, Drogheda
2009	Louth	1-17	DCU	1-10	Gaelic Grounds, Drogheda
2008	Dublin	2-12	Longford	1-14	Parnell Park
2007	Dublin	1-18	Laois	2-13	O'Moore Park
2006	Meath	3-14	Offaly	0-14	Páirc Tailteann
2005	Laois	0-17	Westmeath	0-12	Cusack Park, Mullingar
2004	Meath	2-6	Westmeath	0-11	Cusack Park, Mullingar
2003	Kildare	0-12	Longford	1-6	Pearse Park
2002	Carlow	2-10	Wicklow	0-8	Dr. Cullen Park
2001	Meath	1-11	Westmeath	0-11	Cusack Park, Mullingar
2000	Longford	2-6	Westmeath	0-7	Cusack Park, Mullingar
1999	Dublin	1-16	Louth	1-10	Parnell Park
1998	Offaly	4-7	Louth	2-7	Gaelic Grounds, Drogheda
1997	Offaly	4-13	Wexford	0-5	O'Connor Park
1996	Wicklow	0-12	Wexford	1-7	Aughrim
1995	Wexford (Note: Wexford awarded title as Westmeath refused to play extra time.)	0-9	Westmeath	1-6	Wexford Park
1994	Laois	3-9	Meath	1-11	O'Moore Park
1993	Offaly	1-10	Meath	0-7	Páirc Tailteann
1992	Meath	1-11	Wexford	0-7	Páirc Uí Shíocháin, Gorey
1991	Laois	0-13	Wicklow	0-10	O'Moore Park
1990	Louth	2-4	Kildare	1-6	Gaelic Grounds, Drogheda
1989	Kildare	2-8	Meath	0-9	St Conleth's Park
1988	Westmeath	0-9, 0-13 (R)	Laois	2-3, 2-5 (R)	O'Moore Park
1987	Laois	1-8	Wexford	0-9	Bellefield, Enniscorthy
1986	Wicklow	1-7	Westmeath	0-6	Cusack Park, Mullingar
1985	Not held				
1984	Not held				
1983	Meath	1-11	Longford	1-9	Pearse Park
1982	Kildare	2-8	Wicklow	1-5	St Conleth's Park
1981	Offaly	1-12	Dublin	0-11	Parnell Park
1980	Louth	0-8	Dublin	1-4	St Brigid's Park, Dowdallshill
1979	Not held				
1978	Laois	3-7	Carlow	1-8	Dr. Cullen Park
1977	Meath	2-9	Offaly	0-9	Páirc Tailteann
1976	Kildare	1-9	Wexford	0-9	Wexford Park
1975	Not held				
1974	Meath	1-9	Dublin	2-5	Páirc Tailteann
1973	Kildare	3-11	Dublin	1-4	Fr. Brennan Park, Naas
1972	Not held				
1971	Not held				
1970	Kildare	2-8	Louth	0-8	Gaelic Grounds, Drogheda
1969	Not held				
1968	Kildare	2-7	Westmeath	1-6	St Conleth's Park
1967	Meath	0-10	Dublin	1-5	Páirc Tailteann
1966	Dublin	1-5	Offaly	0-6	St Brendan's Park
1965	Longford	1-9	Kildare	1-6	Pearse Park
1964	Westmeath	1-9	Carlow	1-5	O'Connor Park
1963	Louth	1-10	Longford	0-10	Gaelic Grounds, Drogheda
1962	Kildare	2-6	Louth	1-7	Croke Park
1961	Offaly	1-9	Longford	0-6	O'Connor Park
1960	Dublin	2-6, 1-11 (R)	Louth	1-9, 0-7 (R)	Croke Park
1959	Westmeath	1-5	Kildare	1-4	Cusack Park, Mullingar
1958	Dublin	1-6, 2-9 (R)	Meath	1-6, 2-8 (R)	Páirc Tailteann
1957	Wicklow	2-9	Kildare	0-10	Blessington
1956	Dublin	1-10	Kildare	1-3	St Conleth's Park
1955	Wicklow	1-6	Westmeath	0-7	St Conleth's Park
1954	Offaly	0-10	Louth	1-5	Croke Park

== O'Byrne Shield ==
Team	Wins	Years won
Laois	3	2008, 2009, 2012
Longford	2	2006, 2007
Carlow	2	2010, 2026
Dublin	1	2011
Louth	1	2024
