= Gaelic Grounds (Drogheda) =

GAA stadium in Drogheda, Ireland

- Páirc na nGael
- Interactive map of Gaelic Grounds
- Location: Cross Lane, Drogheda, County Louth, A92 FDK6, Ireland
- Coordinates: 53°43′25″N 6°21′34″W
- Owner: Louth GAA
- Capacity: 3,500
- Field size: 142 x 81.5 m
- Public transit: North Road bus stop Drogheda railway station

Construction
- Opened: 1926

The Gaelic Grounds, known for sponsorship reasons as the Integral GAA Grounds, is a Gaelic Athletic Association (GAA) stadium in Drogheda, County Louth, Ireland. It was the home of the Louth Gaelic football team from 1926 until 2020. Its official opening took place in April 1926, with Louth taking on Dublin. The game ended in a 0–6 to 0–2 win for Louth.

The ground has a capacity of about 3,500. When it was used for inter-county Gaelic football games, it was one of the smallest county grounds in Ireland.

Drogheda club side O'Raghallaighs lease the facilities from Louth GAA and have played their home matches in the Gaelic Grounds since the 1970s.

== See also ==
- List of Gaelic Athletic Association stadiums
- List of stadiums in Ireland by capacity
