= Louth county football team =

Gaelic football team

Louth
- Sport: Football
- Irish: Lughbhadh; An Lú
- Nickname(s): The Wee County
- County board: Louth GAA
- Manager: Gavin Devlin
- Captain: Sam Mulroy
- Home venue(s): DEFY Páirc Mhuire, Ardee

Recent competitive record
- Current All-Ireland status: SF in 2026
- Last championship title: 1957
- Current NFL Division: 2 (3rd in 2026)
- Last league title: None
First colours

The Louth county football team represents Louth in men's Gaelic football and is governed by Louth GAA, the county board of the Gaelic Athletic Association. The team competes in the three major annual inter-county competitions; the All-Ireland Senior Football Championship, the Leinster Senior Football Championship and the National Football League.

As of 2025, Louth's home grounds for league matches included DEFY Páirc Mhuire in Ardee and the Gaelic Grounds in Drogheda. Home fixtures in the All-Ireland Championship have been played at Inniskeen Grattans' pitch in County Monaghan. As of April 2025, plans were progressing on a permanent base for the county side in Dundalk.

The county senior team manager is Gavin Devlin.

As of 2026, the team are the reigning Leinster Senior Football champions, having won the 2025 final against Meath to secure a first title since 1957. Their most recent All-Ireland Senior Championship title was in 1957. Louth has never won a National Football League Division 1 title, finishing runners-up once in 1948-49.

== History ==
The earliest recorded inter-county football match took place in 1712 when Louth faced Meath at Slane. A fragment of a poem from 1806 records a football match between Louth and Fermanagh at Inniskeen, Co Monaghan.

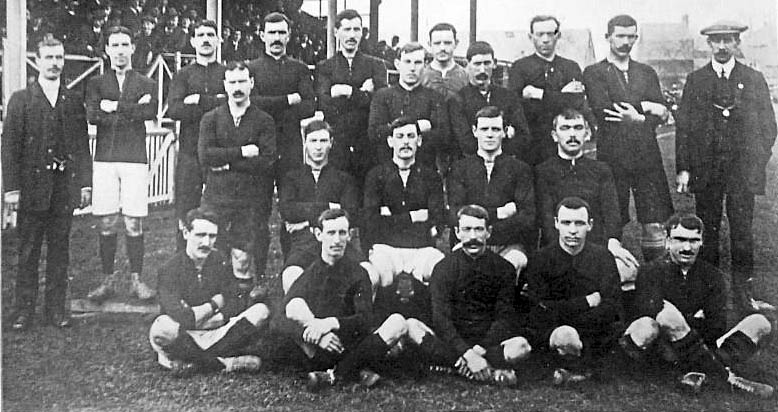
Louth team of 1913, All-Ireland SFC winner

Louth won their first All-Ireland Senior Football Championship in 1910 in unusual circumstances. Their opponents, Kerry, refused to travel to Dublin as the Great Southern and Western Railway would not sell tickets to their fans at reduced rates. 1912 brought a second All-Ireland title as final opponents Antrim were beaten by five points.

When Louth GAA sent the team into training in Dundalk for the 1913 Croke Memorial replay under a soccer trainer from Belfast, the move caused more than a ripple through the Association. For thirty years full-time training in bursts of a week or so before a big match were common. After that the two or three times a week gatherings became more popular. The success of these matches helped the GAA purchase the site that would come to be known as Croke Park.

In 1944 five Louthmen represented their province in the Railway Cup final. Jim Thornton of Cooley Kickhams captained Leinster, who overcame Ulster by 1-10 to 1-03 in the final at Croke Park on St Patrick's Day. Alongside him were county colleagues Paddy Larkin, Jim Quigley (Dundalk Young Irelands), Eddie Boyle (Cooley Kickhams) and Ollie Halpin of St Magdalene's.

Louth would not reach another All-Ireland Senior Football final until 1950, when they suffered a narrow two-point loss to Mayo. In 1957 Louth again reached the All-Ireland Senior Football final. Showband star and captain Dermot O'Brien arrived late for the game and joined the team after the parade was completed. He had taken over the captaincy for the semi-final against Tyrone after regular captain Patsy Coleman had been injured. Coleman still has the match ball from the 1957 final in his possession. O'Brien played a key role as Louth beat Cork to secure a third senior All-Ireland title for the county, aided by a goal from Seán Cunningham with five minutes left to play . As both Cork and Louth wear Red and White, on Final day Louth wore the green of Leinster while Cork lined out in the blue of Munster.

Louth had by then accumulated eight Leinster football championship titles in addition to three Senior All-Irelands. However a protracted period in the doldrums lay in store for the county football team. A reverse at the hands of Offaly in the 1960 provincial decider would be Louth's last appearance in a Leinster senior final for fifty years.

Louth defeated Tipperary by two points in the first ever All-Ireland Qualifier in 2001.

=== Rivalry with Meath ===
Between 1945 and 1953 Louth and Meath met 13 times. The crowds got bigger and bigger each time as they played draw after draw in the Championship. The attendance of 42,858 at a thrilling 1951 replay remained a record for a provincial match other than a final for forty years until the four-match series between Meath and Dublin in 1991. The rivalry with Meath has never fizzled out, as witnessed by a stirring Leinster SFC semi-final in 1998. Nor has controversy, as Graham Geraghty's disputed point in the 45th minute of that match proved decisive.

=== 2010 Leinster SFC final ===
On 11 July 2010, Louth returned to the Leinster SFC final, where they took on neighbours Meath. Meath won what was a highly controversial match. Deep into injury time in the 74th minute, referee Martin Sludden awarded a highly contentious goal to Meath. He did so after a brief consultation with one of the match umpires, although television coverage of the game showed that the ball had been carried over the line by Meath player Joe Sheridan. Prior to Sludden's decision, Meath were trailing Louth by one point. He blew his whistle for full-time shortly afterwards. The "goal" proved to be the decisive score.

Irate Louth fans stormed the pitch and began chasing and physically assaulting the referee, who had to be led away by a Garda escort in scenes broadcast to a live television audience. Other scenes of violence saw bottles being hurled from a stand, one striking a steward who fell to the ground and Meath substitute Mark Ward was hit by a Louth fan.

The situation led to much media debate in the days that followed. The violence was condemned and there were calls in the national media for the game to be replayed, including from former Meath players Trevor Giles and Bernard Flynn. GAA President Christy Cooney said the events were a "watershed" and one where the "circumstances were bizarre. I have never seen circumstances like it as long as I have been a member of this Association". He promised life bans for those who had assaulted the referee.

Numerous TV replays showed that Sheridan's goal was indisputably a technical foul with regard to the Playing Rules of Gaelic football. The day after the match the GAA released a statement confirming that Sludden admitted he had made an error. The GAA also stated that the rules left it powerless to offer a replay and that this would be decided by Meath. Following a Meath County Board meeting it emerged that, in his match report, the referee had originally blown for a penalty for Meath but when the ball ended up in the net he decided to award a goal instead. The county board decided not to offer a replay and judged that that would be "the end of the matter". This decision was met in some quarters with mixed feelings and commented upon in the Evening Herald by three-time All-Ireland winning manager Mickey Harte, who said that the Meath county board was even more culpable because their officers had time to form a considered opinion. Harte would later go on to become the Louth manager from 2020 to 2023.

In its statement on the controversy, the Louth County Board spoke of the enormous sense of injustice which was being felt in the county. They also questioned the referee's official report saying it was contrary to Playing Rules where he indicated in his report that he blew the whistle for a penalty, but then changed his mind and awarded a goal instead. They intimated that the committee/council in charge erred in leaving the matter to the Meath County Board to offer a replay without seeking clarification from the referee in relation to his match report and his statement that "he made a terrible mistake".

Louth eventually exited the All-Ireland SFC on 24 July after losing to Dublin in the final qualifier round, on a scoreline of 2-14 to 0-13.

=== Post-2010 ===
Manager Peter Fitzpatrick resigned as Louth senior boss in 2012 after three years in the role.

Aidan O'Rourke was appointed as Fitzpatrick's successor in October 2012. O'Rourke left the role in mid-2014.

Former Louth forward Colin Kelly then managed Louth for three years. He led Louth to successive promotions in the National Football League in 2016 and 2017, though Louth did not make any championship impact during his time in charge.

Louth appointed former minor manager Wayne Kierans as senior team manager on a two-year term in October 2018. Louth were relegated to Division 4 in 2020. Kierans' contract was not renewed.

=== Upturn in fortunes ===
In a major surprise, November 2020 saw former Tyrone coach Mickey Harte appointed as Louth manager for a three-year period, with Gavin Devlin as his assistant.

During the 2021 season, Harte achieved promotion to Division 3 of the National League. Louth went on to win Division 3 in the 2022 season. He brought Louth to a first Leinster final since 2010 in 2023.

Harte resigned in September 2023 and subsequently took over as manager of the Derry senior footballers. County board chairman Peter Fitzpatrick unveiled former Dublin inter-county player Ger Brennan as Louth's new manager on 2 October. In the 2024 season, Louth reached a second consecutive Leinster SFC final for the first time since 1958 and defeated Meath in the championship for the first time since 1975.

On 11 May 2025, Louth defeated Meath by 3–14 to 1–18 in the 2025 Leinster SFC final to win a first Leinster SFC title for 68 years. Ger Brennan then decided to leave his role with one year of his three-year term left.

On 28 June 2026, Louth reached the All-Ireland semi-finals for the first time since 1957 after a 0-27 to 2-18 win against Monaghan in the quarter-finals.

== Panel ==
as per All-Ireland SFC Semi-final, 11 July 2026

No.	Player	Position	Club
1	Niall McDonnell	Goalkeeper	St Fechin's
2	Tiernan Markey	Goalkeeper	St Mary's
3	Emmet Carolan	Right corner-back	Newtown Blues
4	Donal McKenny	Left corner-back	St Mary's
5	Tadhg McDonnell	Right full-back	St Mary's
6	Leonard Grey	Right half-forward	St Patrick's
7	Seán Callaghan	Midfield	St Mary's
8	Conor Early	Midfield	Na Fianna
9	Ciarán Downey	Centre-forward	Newtown Blues
10	Conall McKeever	Right half-back	Clan na Gael
11	Sam Mulroy (c)	Full-forward	Naomh Máirtín
12	Conor Grimes	Right corner-forward	Glen Emmets
13	Ryan Burns	Left corner-forward	Hunterstown Rovers
14	Dara McDonnell	Midfield	Naomh Máirtín

No.	Player	Position	Club
15	Tommy Durnin	Midfield	Westerns
16	Conor Branigan	Left half-forward	Newtown Blues
17	James Maguire	Right half-forward	Carrickmacross Emmets
18	Ciarán Keenan	Right half-forward	St Mary's
19	Conall McCaul	Full-forward	St Joseph's
20	Craig Lennon	Left half-back	St Mochta's
21	Ciarán Byrne	Midfield	St Mochta's
22	Seán Reynolds	Centre-forward	Stabannon Parnells
23	Dáire Nally	Left half-back	Newtown Blues
24	Paul Matthews	Midfield	St Fechin's
25	Anthony Williams	Centre-back	Dreadnots
26	Kieran McArdle	Right corner-forward	St Bride's
27	Padraic Tinnelly	Right corner-back	Dundalk Gaels

^{INJ} Player has had an injury which has affected recent involvement with the county team.
^{RET} Player has since retired from the county team.
^{WD} Player has since withdrawn from the county team due to a non-injury issue.

== Management team ==
Appointed July 2025:

- Manager: Gavin Devlin
- Assistant manager: Peter Dooley

== Managerial history ==
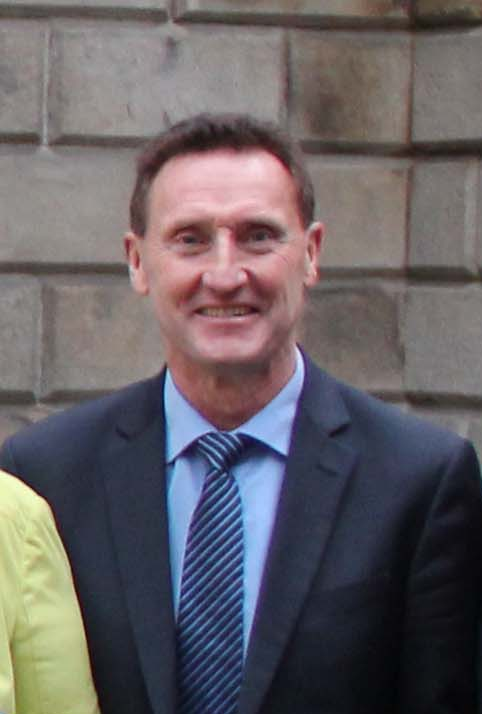
Peter Fitzpatrick, pictured here in 2015, managed Louth to the 2010 Leinster Senior Football Championship Final and, later, as Louth County Board chairman, appointed Mickey Harte as manager in 2020.

Year	Name	Club/County
1968–72	Stephen White	Dundalk Young Irelands
1972–75	Jimmy Mulroy	Newtown Blues
1975–76	Jack Smith	Newtown Blues
1976–80	Management committee	Louth
1980–82	Frank Lynch	Geraldines
1982–84	Jimmy Mulroy	Newtown Blues
1984–85	Frank Fagan	Dundalk Young Irelands
1985	Management committee	Louth
1985–87	Mickey Whelan	
1987–91	Frank Lynch	Geraldines
1991–94	Declan Smyth	
1994–97	Paul Kenny	Dundalk Gaels
1997–2001	Paddy Clarke	Mattock Rangers/Stabannon Parnells
2001–03	Paddy Carr	
2003–05	Val Andrews	
2005–09	Eamonn McEneaney	
2009–12	Peter Fitzpatrick	Clan na Gael
2012–14	Aidan O'Rourke	
2014–17	Colin Kelly	Dreadnots
2017–18	Pete McGrath	
2018–20	Wayne Kierans	O'Connells
2020–23	Mickey Harte	
2023–25	Ger Brennan	
2025–	Gavin Devlin	

== Players ==
=== All Stars ===
2010: Paddy Keenan
2024: Craig Lennon
2025: Sam Mulroy

=== Internationals ===
Two Louth players have represented Ireland versus Australia in the International Rules Series in recent years, Paddy Keenan and Ciarán Byrne.

=== Team of the Millennium ===
The team below was chosen from a list of 75 nominees by the County Board in February 2000. Their aim was to select the best 15 players who had ever played for Louth in their respective positions, since the foundation of the GAA in 1884 up to the Millennium year, 2000.

	Goalkeeper
	Gerry Farrell (Cooley Kickhams)
Right corner back	Full back	Left corner back
Jack Bell (St Mary's)	Eddie Boyle (Cooley Kickhams)	Jim Tuft (Dundalk Young Irelands)
Right half back	Centre back	Left half back
Seán Boyle (Cooley Kickhams/St Mary's)	Jim McArdle (Dundalk Young Irelands/Roche Emmets)	Stephen White (Cooley Kickhams/Dundalk Young Irelands)
	Midfield
Jim Thornton Snr. (Cooley Kickhams)		Jack Regan (Dundalk Gaels)
Right half forward	Centre forward	Left half forward
Kevin Beahan (St Mary's)	Jim Quigley (Dundalk Young Irelands)	Frank Lynch (Geraldines)
Right corner forward	Full forward	Left corner forward
Ollie Halpin (St Magdalene's)	Jimmy McDonnell (Darver Volunteers)	Frank Fagan (Dundalk Young Irelands)

=== Captains ===
Below are the team captains (1934–):

Name	Year(s)	Club
Jem Moonan	1934	Newtown Blues
Jimmy Coyle	1935	Seán McDermotts (Dublin)
Eddie Boyle	1936	Cooley Kickhams
Jim Culligan	1937	Newtown Blues
Paddy McManus	1938	Wolfe Tones
Jimmy Coyle	1939	Seán McDermotts (Dublin)
Unknown	1940	
Jim Quigley	1941-42	Dundalk Young Irelands
Jack Regan	1943	Dundalk Gaels
Jim Thornton Snr	1944	Cooley Kickhams
Unknown	1945	
Jack Regan	1946	Dundalk Gaels
Unknown	1947	
Jim Quigley	1948	Dundalk Young Irelands
Seán Boyle	1949	St Mary's
Tom Conlon	1950	Stabannon Parnells
Stephen White	1951	Dundalk Young Irelands
Paddy Markey	1952	St Mary's
Jack Regan	1953–54	Dundalk Gaels
Tom Conlon	1955	Stabannon Parnells
Paddy McArdle	1956	St Mary's
Dermot O'Brien	1957–58	St Mary's
Jim McArdle	1959	Roche Emmets
John McArdle	1960	Clan na Gael
Kevin Beahan	1961	St Mary's
Jimmy Mulroy	1962–65	Newtown Blues
Muckle McKeown	1966	O'Raghallaighs
Liam Leech	1967	Newtown Blues
Frank Lynch	1968	Geraldines
Michael Rice	1969	St Mary's
Frank Clarke	1970	Newtown Blues
Danny Nugent	1971	Newtown Blues
Jim Thornton	1972	Cooley Kickhams
Benny Gaughran	1973	Clan na Gael
Leslie Toal	1974	Clan na Gael
Danny Nugent	1975	Newtown Blues
Benny Gaughran	1976	Civil Service (Dublin)
Peadar Gallagher	1977	Cooley Kickhams
Gerry Farrell	1978	Cooley Kickhams
J. P. O'Kane	1979	Kilkerley Emmets
Michael McCabe	1980–81	Dundalk Young Irelands
Matt McDermott	1982	St Fechin's
Jimmy McDonnell	1983	Geraldines
Matt McDermott	1984–85	St Fechin's
Eugene Judge	1986–87	Newtown Blues
Peter Fitzpatrick	1988	Clan na Gael
Richie Culhane	1989	Newtown Blues
Kevin O'Hanlon	1990	Clan na Gael
Stephen Melia	1991	John Mitchels
Stefan White	1992	Clan na Gael

Name	Year(s)	Club
David Reilly	1993	Stabannon Parnells
Peter Fitzpatrick	1994	Clan na Gael
Stephen Melia	1995	John Mitchels
Séamus O'Hanlon	1996–97	Clan na Gael
Gareth O'Neill	1998–99	Simonstown Gaels (Meath)
Nicky Malone	2000–01	Lann Léire
Martin Farrelly	2002	Lann Léire
Aaron Hoey	2003	St Bride's
Ollie McDonnell	2004	St Joseph's
Mark Stanfield	2005	O'Connells
Martin Farrelly	2006	St Joseph's
Peter McGinnity	2007	Dundalk Gaels
Colin Goss	2008	St Patrick's
Paddy Keenan	2009–14	St Patrick's
Adrian Reid	2015–16	Mattock Rangers
Pádraig Rath	2017	Dreadnots
Andy McDonnell	2018	Newtown Blues
Bevan Duffy	2019–20	St Fechin's
Sam Mulroy	2021–	Naomh Máirtín

== Honours ==
=== National ===
- All-Ireland Senior Football Championship
  - (gold) Winners (3): 1910, 1912, 1957
  - (silver) Runners-up (3): 1887, 1909, 1950
- National Football League
  - (silver) Runners-up (1): 1948–49
- National Football League Division 2
  - (gold) Winners (3): 1996-97, 1999-2000, 2006
- National Football League Division 3
  - (gold) Winners (4): 1982–83, 1987–88, 2011, 2022
- National Football League Division 4
  - (gold) Winners (2): 2016, 2021 (shared with Antrim)
- Tommy Murphy Cup
  - (gold) Winners (1): 2006
- All-Ireland 'B' Football Championship
  - (gold) Winners (1): 1997
- All-Ireland Junior Football Championship
  - (gold) Winners (4): 1925, 1932, 1934, 1961
  - (silver) Runners-up (2): 1912, 1928
- All-Ireland Minor Football Championship
  - (gold) Winners (2): 1936, 1940
  - (silver) Runners-up (2): 1931, 1941
- All-Ireland Under-20 Football Championship
  - (silver) Runners-up (1): 2025

=== Provincial ===
- Leinster Senior Football Championship
  - (gold) Winners (9): 1909, 1910, 1912, 1943, 1948, 1950, 1953, 1957, 2025
  - (silver) Runners-up (16): 1889, 1892, 1900, 1905, 1913, 1914, 1918, 1934, 1935, 1937, 1952, 1958, 1960, 2010, 2023, 2024
- O'Byrne Cup
  - (gold) Winners (4): 1963, 1980, 1990, 2009
  - (silver) Runners-up (10): 1954, 1960, 1962, 1970, 1998, 1999, 2010, 2011, 2017, 2023
- O'Byrne Shield
  - (gold) Winners (1): 2024
- Leinster Junior Football Championship
  - (gold) Winners (12): 1910, 1912, 1925, 1928, 1932, 1934, 1946, 1957, 1961, 1966, 2009, 2010
  - (silver) Runners-up (11): 1941, 1954, 1984, 1985, 1989, 1994, 1997, 2005, 2006, 2016, 2017
- Owen Treacy Cup
  - (gold) Winners (1): 2006
- Leinster Under-20/21 Football Championship
  - (gold) Winners (4): 1970, 1978, 1981, 2025
  - (silver) Runners-up (5): 1979, 1983, 1996, 2012, 2024, 2026
- Leinster Minor Football Championship
  - (gold) Winners (8): 1931, 1935, 1936, 1940, 1941, 1942, 1951, 1953
  - (silver) Runners-up (8): 1932, 1937, 1938, 1939, 1958, 1960, 1971, 2017, 2025
- Gerry Reilly Cup
  - (gold) Winners (2): 2022, 2025
- Leinster Under-14 Football Championship
  - (gold) Winners (1): 1974
