= 1937 All-Ireland Minor Football Championship =

Gaelic football competition

Championship details

All-Ireland Champions
- Winning team: Cavan (1st win)

All-Ireland Finalists
- Losing team: Wexford

Provincial Champions
- Munster: Kerry
- Leinster: Wexford
- Ulster: Cavan
- Connacht: Galway

The 1937 All-Ireland Minor Football Championship was the ninth staging of the All-Ireland Minor Football Championship, the Gaelic Athletic Association's premier inter-county Gaelic football tournament for boys under the age of 18.

Louth entered the championship as defending champions, however, they were defeated in the Leinster Championship.

Cavan won the championship following a 1-11 to 1-5 defeat of Wexford in the All-Ireland final. This was their first All-Ireland title.

== Results ==
=== Leinster Minor Football Championship ===
==== Final ====
25 July 1937

Wexford	2–07–2-05	Louth
Dunbar (1-3, 1f), Howlin (1-0), Thorpe (0-2), Murphy (0-1), Williams (0-1)

Croke Park, Dublin
Referee: S. Synnott (Dublin)

GK	1	Michael Kehoe (Gusserane O'Rahilly's)
RCB	2	James Dwyer (Slaney Harriers)
FB	3	Nick Butler (St John's Volunteers) (c)
LCB	4	Harry Kenny (Slaney Harriers)
RHB	5	Dermot Hall (St John's Volunteers)
CHB	6	Tom Hurley (St John's Volunteers)
LHB	7	John Morris (St John's Volunteers)
MF	8	Jack Murphy (Starlights)
MF	9	Patrick Foley (Gusserane O'Rahilly's)
RHF	10	Patrick Dunbar (Starlights)
CHF	11	Edward Roice (St John's Volunteers)
LHF	12	William Howlin (St John's Volunteers)
RCF	13	James Williams (Mulgannon Harriers)
FF	14	Tom Redmond (St John's Volunteers)
LCF	15	Sam Thorpe (Slaney Harriers)

GK	1	Martin O'Brien (Glyde Rangers)
RCB	2	M.G. Byrne (St. Mary's College)
FB	3	Jim Quigley (Dundalk Young Irelands)
LCB	4	Tom McArdle (Dundalk Gaels)
RHB	5	Kevin Devin (St. Mary's College)
CHB	6	Frank Rock (St. Mary's College) (c)
LHB	7	Peter Woods (Glyde Rangers)
MF	8	Niall Hardy (St. Mary's College)
MF	9	Brian Reynolds (Darver Young Irelands)
RHF	10	Chris O'Higgins (St. Mary's College)
CHF	11	Ollie Halpin (St Magdalene's)
LHF	12	Kevin O'Dowda (St. Mary's College)
RCF	13	Willie Murtagh (Dundalk Gaels)
FF	14	Aidan Goulding (St. Mary's College)
LCF	15	Jim Cunningham (Dundalk Young Irelands)
