= 1938 All-Ireland Minor Football Championship =

Championship details

All-Ireland Champions
- Winning team: Cavan (2nd win)

All-Ireland Finalists
- Losing team: Kerry

Provincial Champions
- Munster: Kerry
- Leinster: Longford
- Ulster: Cavan
- Connacht: Galway

The 1938 All-Ireland Minor Football Championship was the 10th staging of the All-Ireland Minor Football Championship, the Gaelic Athletic Association's premier inter-county Gaelic football tournament for boys under the age of 18.

Cavan entered the championship as defending champions.

On 25 September 1938, Cavan won the championship following a 3-3 to 0-8 defeat of Kerry in the All-Ireland final. This was their second All-Ireland title overall and their second in succession.

== Results ==
=== Leinster Minor Football Championship ===
10 July Semi-Final (Draw)	Louth	1–05 - 1–05	Carlow	Croke Park, Dublin

31 July Semi-Final (Replay)	Louth	3–06 - 2–06	Carlow	Parnell Park, Dublin

31 July Semi-Final	Longford	0–07 - 1–03	Laois	O'Connor Park, Tullamore

=== Final ===
7 August	Longford	3–06 - 2–08	Louth	Croke Park, Dublin
	K. Banks 2-0, P. Beirne 1-0, J. McGuire 0-3, C. McGoey, P. Lehane, J. McDermott 0-1 each		P. Regan 2-3, J. Fay 0-3, K. Devin, W. Larkin 0-1 each

GK	1	Tom Murphy (Clonguish)
RCB	2	Pat Fagan (Seán Connolly's)
FB	3	Charlie Baxter (Whiterock Slashers)
LCB	4	Barney McGoey (Clonguish)
RHB	5	Kevin Clinton (Clonguish)
CHB	6	Paddy McGrath (St Brigid's, Killashee)
LHB	7	Joe Kane (Seán Connolly's)
MF	8	Jimmy Reilly (Mullinalaghta)
MF	9	Tommy Daly (St Mel's College)
RHF	10	Joe McGuire (Killoe Young Emmets)
CHF	11	Christy McGoey (Clonguish)
LHF	12	Paddy Lehane (St Mel's College)
RCF	13	Kevin Banks (Whiterock Slashers)
FF	14	Pete Beirne (Clonguish)
LCF	15	Johnny McDermott (St Brigid's, Killashee)

GK	1	Ben Connolly (St. Mary's College)
RCB	2	Brendan Burke (St. Mary's College)
FB	3	Peter Woods (Glyde Rangers)
LCB	4	Tommy Quigley (Dundalk Young Irelands)
RHB	5	Kevin Devin (St. Mary's College) (c)
CHB	6	Ned Reay (St Magdalene's)
LHB	7	Joseph Clarke (Castlebellingham)
MF	8	Teddy McArdle (Dundalk Young Irelands)
MF	9	Ollie Halpin (St Magdalene's)
RHF	10	Chris O'Higgins (St. Mary's College)
CHF	11	Jack Bransfield (St. Mary's College)
LHF	12	Jimmy Fay (St. Mary's College)
RCF	13	P. Smith (Drogheda Davitts)
FF	14	Paddy Regan (Dundalk Gaels)
LCF	15	Willie Larkin (Dundalk Young Irelands)
Substitutes:
	16	Joe Leonard (Dundalk Gaels) for Quigley

=== All-Ireland Minor Football Championship ===
Semi-Finals

Final

25 September 1938 Final	Cavan	3-03 - 0-08	Kerry	Croke Park, Dublin
