= Liam Gilmartin =

Irish Gaelic footballer (1921–2019)

Personal information
- Native name: Liam Mac Giolla Mhártain (Irish)
- Born: 31 May 1921 Knockcroghery, County Roscommon, Ireland
- Died: 2 March 2019 (aged 97) Raheny, Dublin, Ireland
- Occupation: Garda

Sport
- Sport: Gaelic football
- Position: Midfield
Club
- Years: Club
- St Patrick's
Club titles
- Roscommon titles: 3
Inter-county
- Years: County
- 1939–1945: Roscommon
Inter-county titles
- Connacht titles: 2
- All-Irelands: 2
- NFL: 0

Liam Gilmartin (31 May 1921 – 2 March 2019) was an Irish Gaelic footballer who played at club level with St Patrick's and at senior level for the Roscommon county team. He usually lined out as a midfielder. Gilmartin is regarded as one of Roscommon's all-time greatest players.

== Career ==
Gilmartin first came to prominence as a footballer with the Roscommon CBS team that won the Connacht Championship for the first time in 1940. By this stage he had also began his football career at club level with St Patrick's and enjoyed his first success in 1941 when the club won the Roscommon Championship. Gilmartin won further titles in 1942 and 1944.

At inter-county level, Gilmartin captained the successful Roscommon minor team that won the All-Ireland Championship in 1939. He also joined the Roscommon senior team in 1939. From his debut, Gilmartin was ever-present as a midfielder and made a number of National League and Championship appearances in a career that ended with his last game in 1945. During that time he was part of two All-Ireland Championship-winning teams – in 1942 and 1943. Gilmartin also secured two Connacht Championship medals. Gilmartin was forced into retirement after contracting tuberculosis in 1945.

== Honours ==
Roscommon CBS

- Connacht Colleges Senior Football Championship (1): 1940

St Patrick's

- Roscommon Senior Football Championship (3): 1941, 1942, 1944

Roscommon

- All-Ireland Senior Football Championship (2): 1943, 1944
- Connacht Senior Football Championship (2): 1943, 1944
- All-Ireland Minor Football Championship (1): 1939 (c)
- Connacht Minor Football Championship (1): 1939 (c)

Achievements
Preceded by Paddy Conaty	All-Ireland Minor Football Final winning captain 1939	Succeeded by Brendan Burke
