= 1936 All-Ireland Minor Football Championship =

Gaelic football competition

Championship details

All-Ireland Champions
- Winning team: Louth (1st win)
- Captain: Larry McEntee

All-Ireland Finalists
- Losing team: Kerry
- Captain: Tom O'Connor

Provincial Champions
- Munster: Kerry
- Leinster: Louth
- Ulster: Antrim
- Connacht: Mayo

The 1936 All-Ireland Minor Football Championship was the eighth staging of the All-Ireland Minor Football Championship, the Gaelic Athletic Association's premier inter-county Gaelic football tournament for boys under the age of 18.

Mayo entered the championship as defending champions.

On 27 September 1936 Louth won the championship following a 5-01 to 1-08 defeat of Kerry in the All-Ireland final, after leading by five points at the interval. This was their first All-Ireland title.

The victorious Louth team included several players from neighbouring counties who were boarding pupils at St. Mary's College, then the dominant side in Louth minor football. One of the boarders was captain Larry 'Lal' McEntee from Nobber, County Meath, whose nephew Dr. Gerry McEntee won the All-Ireland Senior Football Championship in both 1987 and 1988 with Meath.

== Results ==
=== Connacht Minor Football Championship ===
Final	Mayo	4-09 - 1-08	Sligo

=== Munster Minor Football Championship ===
Final	Kerry	1-05 - 1-02	Tipperary

=== Leinster Minor Football Championship ===
19 July 1936 Final	Louth	3-06 - 2-00	Wexford	Croke Park
	J. McArdle 1-3, L. McEntee 1-2, J. Cunningham 1-0, D. Brady 0-1		J. Lacey, J. Gethings 1-0 each	Referee: Seán O'Neill (Dublin)

GK	1	Aloysius Lynn (St. Mary's College)
RCB	2	Pat Tuite (Dundalk Gaels)
FB	3	Leo Burns (Dundalk Young Irelands)
LCB	4	Frank Rock (St. Mary's College)
RHB	5	Peter Killen (Cooley Kickhams)
CHB	6	Larry Waller (Dowdallshill)
LHB	7	Vincent O'Dowda (Dundalk Young Irelands)
MF	8	Donal Brady (St. Mary's College)
MF	9	Michael Campbell (Cooley Kickhams)
RHF	10	James Reilly (Wolfe Tones)
CHF	11	Steve Gaughran (Dundalk Gaels)
LHF	12	Larry McEntee (St. Mary's College) (c)
RCF	13	Jim Cunningham (Dundalk Young Irelands)
FF	14	Jim McArdle (Dundalk Gaels)
LCF	15	Gerry Hall (Dundalk Gaels)
Substitutes:
	16	Kevin O'Dowda (St. Mary's College) for Reilly

GK	1	D. Sheehan (Starlights)
RCB	2	N. Butler (St John's Volunteers)
FB	3	B. Corish (St John's Volunteers) (c)
LCB	4	A. Hendrick (Starlights)
RHB	5	T. Hurley (St John's Volunteers)
CHB	6	T. Donnelly (Starlights)
LHB	7	W. Dobbs (Starlights)
MF	8	M. Kilby (Good Counsel College)
MF	9	J. Murphy (Starlights)
RHF	10	P. Dunbar (Starlights)
CHF	11	W. Howlin (St John's Volunteers)
LHF	12	J. Lacey (Cassagh)
RCF	13	T. Roche (St John's Volunteers)
FF	14	E. Roice (St John's Volunteers)
LCF	15	J. Gethings (St John's Volunteers)

=== Ulster Minor Football Championship ===
Final	Antrim	2-07 - 2-04	Tyrone

=== All-Ireland Minor Football Championship ===
9 August 1936 Semi-Final	Kerry	1-01 - 0-03	Mayo	Roscommon

30 August 1936 Semi-Final	Louth	3-08 - 1-03	Antrim	Athletic Grounds, Dundalk

27 September 1936 Final	Louth	5–01 - 1–08	Kerry	Croke Park
	J. McArdle 2-0, L. McEntee, J. Cunningham, G. Hall 1-0 each, D. Brady 0-1		T. Scannell 1-1, P. Sexton 0-3, T. O'Sullivan, P. Breen, T. Brosnan, T. O'Connor 0-1 each	Referee: Tom Shevlin (Roscommon)

GK	1	Aloysius Lynn (St. Mary's College)
RCB	2	Pat Tuite (Dundalk Gaels)
FB	3	Leo Burns (Dundalk Young Irelands)
LCB	4	Frank Rock (St. Mary's College)
RHB	5	Michael Cunningham (Wolfe Tones)
CHB	6	Larry Waller (Dowdallshill)
LHB	7	Vincent O'Dowda (Dundalk Young Irelands)
MF	8	Donal Brady (St. Mary's College)
MF	9	Eugene McGrath (Cooley Kickhams)
RHF	10	James Reilly (Wolfe Tones)
CHF	11	Kevin O'Dowda (St. Mary's College)
LHF	12	Larry McEntee (St. Mary's College) (c)
RCF	13	Jim Cunningham (Dundalk Young Irelands)
FF	14	Jim McArdle (Dundalk Gaels)
LCF	15	Gerry Hall (Dundalk Gaels)
Substitutes:
	16	Jim Quigley (Dundalk Young Irelands) for Michael Cunningham

GK	1	P. Kennedy (Dingle CBS)
RCB	2	G. Teehan (Keel)
FB	3	J. Keohane (John Mitchels)
LCB	4	P. Dowling (Ardfert St Brendan's)
RHB	5	C. O'Sullivan (Tralee CBS)
CHB	6	W. Casey (Dingle CBS)
LHB	7	T. Healy (John Mitchels)
MF	8	D. Healy (John Mitchels)
MF	9	T. O'Connor (Dingle CBS) (c)
RHF	10	P. Sexton (Dr Crokes)
CHF	11	T. O'Sullivan (Dingle CBS)
LHF	12	T. Lyne (Killarney Legion)
RCF	13	P. Breen (Castleisland Desmonds)
FF	14	B. Scannell (Coláiste na Mumhan, Mallow)
LCF	15	T. Brosnan (Dingle CBS)
Substitutes:
