= 2021 Louth county football team season =

Louth county football team
2021 season
- Manager: Mickey Harte
- NFL D4 North: 2nd (promoted)
- All-Ireland SFC: Did not compete
- Leinster SFC: Preliminary round

The following is a summary of Louth county football team's 2021 season.

Andy McDonnell retired at the end of this season, having made 93 appearances. His final match was against Antrim. He returned for the 2025 season.

== Competitions ==
=== O'Byrne Cup ===
There was no O'Byrne Cup in 2021 due to the impact of the COVID-19 pandemic on Gaelic games.

=== National Football League Division 4 North ===
==== Table ====
| Pos | Team | Pld | W | D | L | PF | PA | PD | Pts | Qualification |
|---|---|---|---|---|---|---|---|---|---|---|
| 1 | Antrim (P) | 3 | 3 | 0 | 0 | 63 | 60 | +3 | 6 | Advance to Division 4 semi-finals; both finalists are promoted to Division 3 |
| 2 | Louth (P) | 3 | 2 | 0 | 1 | 63 | 45 | +18 | 4 | Advance to Division 4 semi-finals; both finalists are promoted to Division 3 |
| 3 | Sligo | 3 | 1 | 0 | 2 | 63 | 67 | −4 | 2 | Advance to Division 4 Shield Final |
| 4 | Leitrim | 3 | 0 | 0 | 3 | 50 | 67 | −17 | 0 | |

Updated to match(es) played on 30 May 2021. Source: GAA.ie
Rules for classification: Tiebreakers
(P) Promoted

==== Fixtures ====
| 15 May 2021 1 | Louth | 3-8 (17) – (18) 1-15 | Antrim | Haggardstown |
| 15:00 | | | | Venue: McGeough Park |
| | | | | Referee: Barry Tiernan |

| 23 May 2021 2 | Leitrim | 0-10 (10) – (19) 0-19 | Louth | Carrick-on-Shannon |
| 15:00 | | | | Venue: Páirc Seán Mac Diarmada |
| | | | | Referee: Patrick Maguire |

| 30 May 2021 3 | Louth | 3-18 (27) – (17) 1-14 | Sligo | Haggardstown |
| 15:00 | | | | Venue: McGeough Park |
| | | | | Referee: Sean Laverty |

12 June 2021
16:00 IST (UTC+1)
Semi-final

| Louth | 1-23 – 1-15 | Carlow |
|---|---|---|
| Mulroy 0-7 (5f, 1'45), Grimes 1-2, Keenan 0-3, Downey 0-3, C. Byrne 0-3, Jackson 0-2, Callaghan 0-1, Duffy 0-1, D. Byrne 0-1 |

Dr Cullen Park, Carlow
Referee: Barry Tiernan (Dublin)

| GK | 1 | Craig Lynch (Naomh Máirtin) |
| RCB | 2 | Dan Corcoran (Geraldines) |
| FB | 3 | Dermot Campbell (Dreadnots) |
| LCB | 4 | Donal McKenny (St Mary's) |
| RHB | 5 | Emmet Carolan (Newtown Blues) |
| CHB | 6 | Niall Sharkey (Glyde Rangers) |
| LHB | 7 | Eoghan Callaghan (Naomh Máirtin) |
| MF | 8 | Bevan Duffy (St Fechin's) |
| MF | 9 | Ciarán Byrne (St Mochta's) |
| RHF | 10 | Liam Jackson (St Mary's) |
| CHF | 11 | Sam Mulroy (Naomh Máirtin) (c) |
| LHF | 12 | Ciarán Downey (Newtown Blues) |
| RCF | 13 | Ciarán Keenan (St Mary's) |
| FF | 14 | Conor Grimes (Glen Emmets) |
| LCF | 15 | Ryan Burns (Hunterstown Rovers) |
Substitutes:
| | 16 | Leonard Grey (St Patrick's) for Corcoran |
| | 17 | Declan Byrne (St Mochta's) for Burns |
| | 18 | Dáire Nally (Newtown Blues) for Campbell |
| | 19 | Conall McKeever (Clan Na Gael) for Duffy |
| | 20 | John Clutterbuck (Naomh Máirtin) for Carolan |

GAAGO

13 June 2021
12:15 IST (UTC+1)
Semi-final

| Waterford | 0-11 – 1-15 | Antrim |

Fraher Field, Dungarvan
Referee: David Murnane

Antrim and Louth shared the Division 4 title, as Louth had a championship game on 27 June 2021.

=== Leinster Senior Football Championship ===
The draw for the preliminary rounds and quarter-finals took place on 20 April 2021.

==== Bracket ====
Preliminary round 27 June
Offaly | 3-19 AET
Louth | 0-19
Longford | 0-25
Carlow | 2-13
Wexford | 2-11
Wicklow | 0-14

Quarter-finals; 4 July
Kildare | 1-15
Offaly | 0-13
Laois | 1-10
Westmeath | 3-20
Meath | 4-22
Longford | 0-12
Dublin | 0-15
Wexford | 0-7

Semi-finals; 18 July
Kildare | 2-14
Westmeath | 0-18
Meath | 1-13
Dublin | 2-16

Final; 1 August
Kildare | 1-9
Dublin | 0-20

==== Fixtures ====
| 27 June 2021; 13:30; Round 1 | Offaly | 3-19 - 0-19 aet | Louth | Páirc Tailteann, Navan; Attendance: 0 Referee: Brendan Cawley (Kildare) |
| 27 June 2021; 13:30; Round 1 | Cian Farrell 0-7 (0-3f), Niall McNamee 1-3, Peter Cunningham 1-1, Bernard Allen 1-0, Paddy Dunican 0-2 (0-1f, 1 '45), Niall Darby, Jordan Hayes, Ruairi McNamee, Bill Carroll, Eoin Carroll, Mark Abbott 0-1 each | Report | Sam Mulroy 0-6 (0-4f), Ciarán Byrne 0-3, Ciarán Keenan 0-2, Dermot Campbell, Anthony Williams, Eoghan Callaghan, Liam Jackson, Ciarán Downey, Conor Grimes, Ryan Burns, Declan Byrne 0-1 each | Páirc Tailteann, Navan; Attendance: 0 Referee: Brendan Cawley (Kildare) |

=== All-Ireland Senior Football Championship ===
Due to the impact of the COVID-19 pandemic on Gaelic games, there was no back-door route into the All-Ireland Championship. Therefore, because Louth did not win the Leinster Championship, they did not qualify for the 2021 All-Ireland Championship.

== Notable events ==
- Mickey Harte was appointed as manager on 23 November 2020.
