= 1940 All-Ireland Minor Football Championship =

Gaelic football competition

Championship details

All-Ireland Champions
- Winning team: Louth (2nd win)
- Captain: Brendan Burke

All-Ireland Finalists
- Losing team: Mayo

Provincial Champions
- Munster: Kerry
- Leinster: Louth
- Ulster: Monaghan
- Connacht: Mayo

The 1940 All-Ireland Minor Football Championship was the 12th staging of the All-Ireland Minor Football Championship, the Gaelic Athletic Association's premier inter-county Gaelic football tournament for boys under the age of 18.

Roscommon entered the championship as defending champions, however, they were defeated in the Connacht Championship.

On 22 September 1940, Louth won the championship following a 5–05 to 2–07 defeat of Mayo in the All-Ireland final. They led by 3–01 to 1–05 at half-time. This was Louth's second All-Ireland title and their first in four championship seasons.

== Results ==
=== Connacht Minor Football Championship ===
Final	Mayo	8–05 – 1–06	Leitrim

=== Leinster Minor Football Championship ===
4 August 1940 Final	Louth	3-05 - 1-06	Kildare	Croke Park
	S. McGivern 2-0, J. Kiernan 1-0, P. McCourt 0-3, P. Corr 0-2 (1f)		L. Cummins 0-4 (4f), J. Martin 1-1, E. Monaghan 0-1	Referee: P. Dunne (Dublin)

GK	1	Colm Browne (Cooley Kickhams)
RCB	2	Brendan Breen (Ardee minors)
FB	3	Brendan Burke (St. Mary's College) (c)
LCB	4	Kevin Flanagan (Ramblers United)
RHB	5	Benny Fretwell (Cooley Kickhams)
CHB	6	Ned Reay (St Magdalene's)
LHB	7	Oliver Mohan (Ardee minors)
MF	8	Larry Murphy (Dowdallshill)
MF	9	Paddy Kelly (Ardee minors)
RHF	10	Gus Cahill (St. Mary's College)
CHF	11	Séamie McGivern (Ardee minors)
LHF	12	Peter Corr (Seán O'Mahony's)
RCF	13	Phil McCourt (Castlebellingham)
FF	14	Jackie Kiernan (St Magdalene's)
LCF	15	George Brennan (Lann Léire)

GK	1	Tom O'Shea (Raheens)
RCB	2	Patrick Heavey (Raheens)
FB	3	James Bracken (Clane)
LCB	4	John Reilly (St Patrick's)
RHB	5	Dan Molloy (Ardclough)
CHB	6	Michael Higgins (Celbridge)
LHB	7	Ronald Broe (Celbridge)
MF	8	Mick Conroy (Allen)
MF	9	Patrick White (Sarsfields)
RHF	10	Chris Barrett (Celbridge)
CHF	11	John Martin (Monasterevan)
LHF	12	Larry Cummins (Allen)
RCF	13	Patrick Keatley (Ballytore)
FF	14	Edward Monaghan (Suncroft)
LCF	15	Michael Owens (Athy)

=== Munster Minor Football Championship ===
Final	Kerry	1–03 – 1–02	Clare

=== Ulster Minor Football Championship ===
Final	Monaghan	0–08 – 0–04	Antrim

=== All-Ireland Minor Football Championship ===
1 September 1940 Semi-Final	Mayo	3–12 – 2–05	Kerry	MacHale Park, Castlebar

18 August 1940 Semi-Final	Louth	3–08 – 0–03	Monaghan	Croke Park

22 September 1940 Final	Louth	5-05 - 2-07	Mayo	Croke Park
	G. Cahill 2-1, G. Brennan, P. McCourt, N. Reay 1-0, J. Kiernan 0-2, P. Corr, S. McGivern 0-1 each		D. Loughrey 2-0, J.J. McGowan 0-4 (4f), J. Ralph ('45), T. Byrne, J. Forkin 0-1 each	Referee: Patrick Dunne (Dublin)

GK	1	Colm Browne (Cooley Kickhams)
RCB	2	Brendan Breen (Ardee minors)
FB	3	Brendan Burke (St. Mary's College) (c)
LCB	4	Kevin Flanagan (Ramblers United)
RHB	5	Benny Fretwell (Cooley Kickhams)
CHB	6	Ned Reay (St Magdalene's)
LHB	7	Oliver Mohan (Ardee minors)
MF	8	Larry Murphy (Dowdallshill)
MF	9	Paddy Kelly (Ardee minors)
RHF	10	Gus Cahill (St. Mary's College)
CHF	11	Séamie McGivern (Ardee minors)
LHF	12	Peter Corr (Seán O'Mahony's)
RCF	13	Phil McCourt (Castlebellingham)
FF	14	Jackie Kiernan (St Magdalene's)
LCF	15	George Brennan (Lann Léire)
Substitutes:

GK	1	A. Breslin
RCB	2	M. Galvin
FB	3	C. Long
LCB	4	J. McLaughlin
RHB	5	T. Acton
CHB	6	F. Mongey
LHB	7	S. Durkin
MF	8	M. Langan
MF	9	J. Ralph
RHF	10	J. Forkin
CHF	11	J.J. McGowan
LHF	12	A. McNally
RCF	13	J. Jennings
FF	14	T. Byrne
LCF	15	D. Loughrey
Substitutes:
	16	P. Browne for McNally
