= 1935 All-Ireland Minor Football Championship =

Gaelic football competition

Championship details

All-Ireland Champions
- Winning team: Mayo (1st win)
- Captain: Billy Durkin

All-Ireland Finalists
- Losing team: Tipperary

Provincial Champions
- Munster: Tipperary
- Leinster: Louth
- Ulster: Declared void
- Connacht: Mayo

The 1935 All-Ireland Minor Football Championship was the seventh staging of the All-Ireland Minor Football Championship, the Gaelic Athletic Association's premier inter-county Gaelic football tournament for boys under the age of 18.

Tipperary entered the championship as defending champions.

On 22 September 1935, Mayo won the championship following a 1–6 to 1–1 defeat of Tipperary in the All-Ireland final. This was their first All-Ireland title.

== Results ==
=== Connacht Minor Football Championship ===
Final	Mayo	2-02 – 1-04	Sligo

=== Leinster Minor Football Championship ===
14 July 1935 Final	Louth	1-07 – 1-06	Dublin	Croke Park
	J. McKeever 1-0, P. Dwyer (2f), L. McEntee 0-2 each, G. Hall, J. Duffy, J. McArdle 0-1 each		P. Daly 1-0, T. McCallion 0-2, J. Carey, W. Reyburn, J. Delaney (f), J. Fogarty 0-1 each	Referee: P. Ratty (Meath)

GK	1	Tom Butler (St. Mary's College)
RCB	2	Leo Burns (Dundalk Young Irelands)
FB	3	Brendan Corcoran (St. Mary's College)
LCB	4	James Callaghan (Ardee Defenders)
RHB	5	Patsy Dunne (Woodington Rangers, Drogheda)
CHB	6	Hugh McNamee (St Bride's)
LHB	7	Peter Killen (Cooley Kickhams)
MF	8	Eamonn Devlin (St. Mary's College)
MF	9	Larry McEntee (St. Mary's College)
RHF	10	Jim Duffy (Dundalk Gaels)
CHF	11	Paddy Dwyer (Woodington Rangers, Drogheda)
LHF	12	Jimmy McKeever (Glyde Rangers)
RCF	13	Joe Marron (Dundalk Young Irelands)
FF	14	Jim McArdle (Dundalk Gaels)
LCF	15	Gerry Hall (Dundalk Gaels)
Substitutes:
	16	Pat Tuite (Dundalk Gaels) for Callaghan

GK	1	W. Browne (Peadar Mackens)
RCB	2	G. Diffney (St Vincent's)
FB	3	M. Tobin (Peadar Mackens)
LCB	4	W. Reburn (St Sylvester's)
RHB	5	M. O'Callaghan (O'Toole's)
CHB	6	J. Barnes (Innisfails)
LHB	7	J. Fagan (O'Toole's)
MF	8	T. McCann (St Vincent's)
MF	9	J. Delaney (Peadar Mackens)
RHF	10	A. Doyle (St Michael's)
CHF	11	T. McCallion (O'Toole's)
LHF	12	J. Fogarty (St Marnock's)
RCF	13	P. Daly (O'Toole's)
FF	14	C. O'Connor (St Vincent's)
LCF	15	J. Carey (Peadar Mackens)

=== Ulster Minor Football Championship ===
Final	Tyrone	2-02 - 2-01	Donegal

=== Munster Minor Football Championship ===
Final	Tipperary	3-05 - 0-04	Cork

=== All-Ireland Minor Football Championship ===
==== Semi-Finals ====
25 August 1935 Draw	Mayo	1-04 - 1-04	Louth	Croke Park

15 September 1935 Replay	Louth	1-02 - 3-05	Mayo	James Stephens Park, Ballina
	L. McEntee 1-1 (1f), P. Dwyer 0-1		P. Judge 2-0, P. Rocke 1-1, M.J. Carney 0-2, D. Egan, T. McNicholas 0-1 each	Attendance: 2,500; Referee: J.V. Kelly (Longford)

GK	1	Tom Butler (St. Mary's College)
RCB	2	Patsy Dunne (Woodington Rangers, Drogheda)
FB	3	Joe Marron (Dundalk Young Irelands)
LCB	4	James Callaghan (Ardee Defenders)
RHB	5	Larry Waller (Dowdallshill)
CHB	6	Hugh McNamee (St Bride's)
LHB	7	Frank Rock (St. Mary's College)
MF	8	Eamonn Devlin (St. Mary's College)
MF	9	Paddy Dwyer (Woodington Rangers, Drogheda)
RHF	10	Jim Duffy (Dundalk Gaels)
CHF	11	Larry McEntee (St. Mary's College)
LHF	12	Patrick Walker (Woodington Rangers, Drogheda)
RCF	13	Jimmy McKeever (Glyde Rangers)
FF	14	Jim McArdle (Dundalk Gaels)
LCF	15	Gerry Hall (Dundalk Gaels)

GK	1	Dermot McNamara (Ballycastle)
RCB	2	Tommy Hannon (Ballyhaunis)
FB	3	Billy Durkin (Swinford)
LCB	4	Joe Sammon (Ballyhaunis)
RHB	5	Paddy Irwin (Castlebar Mitchels)
CHB	6	Paddy O'Malley (Ballintubber)
LHB	7	J.J. McLoughlin (Ballina Stephenites)
MF	8	Paddy Judge (Bonniconlon)
MF	9	Tom McNicholas (Swinford)
RHF	10	Denis Egan (Castlebar Mitchels)
CHF	11	Michael O'Malley (Louisburgh)
LHF	12	John Keane (Claremorris)
RCF	13	Michael Joe Carney (Castlebar Mitchels)
FF	14	Paddy Rocke (Castlebar Mitchels)
LCF	15	Paddy Quinn (Killala)

==== Final ====
22 September 1935	Mayo	1-06 - 1-01	Tipperary	Croke Park
				Referee: P.J. Masterson (Cavan)

== Championship statistics ==
=== Miscellaneous ===
- In the Ulster final, Down defeated Donegal by 2–2 to 2–1, however, an objection to the result was launched by the Donegal County Board. A counter objection was later launched by the Down County Board before the Ulster Council declared the championship null and void. Donegal were later nominated to represent Ulster in the All-Ireland semi-final.
