= 1939 All-Ireland Minor Football Championship =

Gaelic football competition

Championship details

All-Ireland Champions
- Winning team: Roscommon (1st win)

All-Ireland Finalists
- Losing team: Monaghan

Provincial Champions
- Munster: Cork
- Leinster: Westmeath
- Ulster: Monaghan
- Connacht: Roscommon

The 1939 All-Ireland Minor Football Championship was the 11th staging of the All-Ireland Minor Football Championship, the Gaelic Athletic Association's premier inter-county Gaelic football tournament for boys under the age of 18.

Cavan entered the championship as defending champions, however, they were defeated by Monaghan in a replay of the Ulster final.

On 24 September 1939, Roscommon won the championship following a 1–9 to 1–7 defeat of Monaghan in the All-Ireland final. This was their first All-Ireland title.

== Results ==
=== Final ===
30 July

| Westmeath | 1-02–0-02 | Louth |

Croke Park, Dublin

| GK | 1 | Harry Dunne (Kinnegad) |
| RCB | 2 | Tom Beirne (Multyfarnham Franciscan College) |
| FB | 3 | Jack Casserly (Milltown) |
| LCB | 4 | Ned Martin (Rosemount) |
| RHB | 5 | Dessie Delaney (St Finian's College) |
| CHB | 6 | Ted Casey (Drumraney) |
| LHB | 7 | Anthony Coady (Moate All Whites) |
| MF | 8 | Michael Reynolds (Multyfarnham Franciscan College) |
| MF | 9 | Tom Maher (Multyfarnham Franciscan College) |
| RHF | 10 | Kevin Boland (Rosemount) |
| CHF | 11 | Michael Farrelly (St Finian's College) |
| LHF | 12 | Dinny Fox (St Finian's College) |
| RCF | 13 | Eddie O'Reilly (St Finian's College) |
| FF | 14 | Donie O'Donovan (Multyfarnham Franciscan College) |
| LCF | 15 | Billy Cashin (Ballynacargy) |

| GK | 1 | Colm Browne (Cooley Kickhams) |
| RCB | 2 | Brendan Burke (St. Mary's College) |
| FB | 3 | Joey Meade (St Magdalene's) |
| LCB | 4 | P.J. White (Seán O'Mahony's) |
| RHB | 5 | Gerard Kenny (St. Mary's College) |
| CHB | 6 | Ned Reay (St Magdalene's) (c) |
| LHB | 7 | Teddy McArdle (Dundalk Young Irelands) |
| MF | 8 | Jack Regan (Dundalk Gaels) |
| MF | 9 | Petie McKevitt (Cooley Kickhams) |
| RHF | 10 | Jackie Kiernan (St Magdalene's) |
| CHF | 11 | Plunkett O'Callaghan (Dundalk Young Irelands) |
| LHF | 12 | Phil McCourt (Castlebellingham) |
| RCF | 13 | Paddy Cunningham (Dundalk Young Irelands) |
| FF | 14 | Brian Ward (Round Towers, Dromiskin) |
| LCF | 15 | Frank Fagan (Dundalk Young Irelands) |
Substitutes:
| | 16 | James Coburn (Dundalk Young Irelands) for Ward |

=== All-Ireland Minor Football Championship ===
Semi-finals

| 13 August 1939 Semi-final | Roscommon | 0-10 - 1-04 | Cork | Croke Park, Dublin |

| 20 August 1939 Semi-final | Monaghan | 0-05 - 1-01 | Westmeath | Croke Park, Dublin |

Final

| 24 September 1939 Final | Roscommon | 1-09 - 1-07 | Monaghan | Croke Park, Dublin |

== Championship statistics ==
=== Miscellaneous ===
- In the provincial championships there were a number of firsts as Cork, Roscommon and Westmeath won the respective Munster, Connacht and Leinster titles for the first time.
