= 1962 O'Byrne Cup =

Gaelic football competition, Leinster, Ireland

Tournament details
- Province: Leinster
- Year: 1962
- Trophy: O'Byrne Cup
- Date: 25 February 1962 — 25 November 1962
- Teams: 12

Winners
- Champions: Kildare (1st win)
- Captain: Dermot O'Loughlin

Runners-up
- Runners-up: Louth
- Captain: Jimmy Mulroy

The 1962 O'Byrne Cup was a Gaelic football tournament contested by the county teams of Leinster GAA. It was the ninth staging of the O'Byrne Cup competition.

Kildare won their first ever O'Byrne Cup after defeating Louth in the final, played at Croke Park on 25 November 1962.

== Format ==
The tournament was contested on a knockout basis. First-round byes were awarded to Dublin, Kildare, Louth and Wexford.

== Results ==
=== First Round ===
25 February 1962	Meath	2-09 - 1-06	Longford	Páirc Tailteann, Navan

25 February 1962	Wicklow	2-09 - 3-04	Laois	Aughrim, County Wicklow

25 February 1962	Westmeath	3-10 - 4-09	Offaly	Cusack Park, Mullingar

25 February 1962	Carlow	0-08 - 0-09	Kilkenny	Dr Cullen Park, Carlow

=== Second Round ===
11 March 1962	Kildare	2-09 - 0-09	Offaly	St Conleth's Park, Newbridge

6 May 1962	Wicklow	4-06 - 1-12	Dublin	Aughrim, County Wicklow

6 May 1962	Louth	0-15 - 1-06	Meath	Gaelic Grounds, Drogheda

24 June 1962	Kilkenny	0-05 - 5-05	Wexford	Nowlan Park, Kilkenny

=== Semi-Final ===
12 August 1962	Kildare	4-08 - 0-03	Wicklow	St Conleth's Park, Newbridge

12 August 1962	Louth	2-10 - 2-10	Wexford	Gaelic Grounds, Drogheda

16 September 1962 Replay	Wexford	1-05 - 1-12	Louth	Wexford Park

=== Final ===
25 November 1962	Kildare	2-06 - 1-07	Louth	Croke Park
	D. O'Loughlin 2-0, F. Caffrey 0-3, S. Nugent 0-2 (1f), P. Cummins 0-1		J. Marmion 1-2, L. Leech, J. Mulroy 0-2 each, B. O'Hare 0-1	Referee: M. Mangan (Dublin)

GK	1	Des Marron (Clane)
RCB	2	Pa Connolly (Clane)
FB	3	Danny Flood (Athy)
LCB	4	Toss McCarthy (Moorefield)
RHB	5	Jimmy Cummins (Moorefield)
CHB	6	Peter Maguire (Kilcock)
LHB	7	Mick Coughlan (Air Corps, Dublin)
MF	8	Mick Carolan (Round Towers Clondalkin, Dublin)
MF	9	Paddy Moore (Moorefield)
RHF	10	John McNally (Allenwood)
CHF	11	Pat Moore (Carbury)
LHF	12	Johnny Morrissey (Athy)
RCF	13	Paddy Cummins (Carbury)
FF	14	Frank Caffrey (Kilcock)
LCF	15	Dermot O'Loughlin (Round Towers)
Substitutes:
	16	Joe Doyle (Allenwood) for Maguire
	17	Séamus Nugent ((Ballyteague) for Morrissey

GK	1	Andy Kieran (Naomh Mhuire)
RCB	2	Ollie Reilly (Hunterstown Rovers)
FB	3	Leslie Toal (Clan na Gael)
LCB	4	Jackie Reynolds (Newtown Blues)
RHB	5	Patsy Coleman (St Mary's)
CHB	6	Mick Murray (Naomh Mhuire)
LHB	7	Larry Geraghty (Mattock Rangers)
MF	8	Muckle McKeown (O'Raghallaighs)
MF	9	John Woods (Cooley Kickhams)
RHF	10	Mickey Gartlan (Roche Emmets)
CHF	11	Jimmy Mulroy (Newtown Blues)
LHF	12	Liam Leech (Newtown Blues)
RCF	13	Brian O'Hare (Dundalk Gaels)
FF	14	Ollie Geraghty (Mattock Rangers)
LCF	15	Jim Marmion (Roche Emmets)
Substitutes:
	16	Frank Lynch (Geraldines) for L. Geraghty
