= Conall McKeever =

Irish Gaelic footballer

Sport
- Sport: Gaelic football
Club
- Years: Club
- Clan na Gael
Inter-county
- Years: County
- Louth
- Leinster titles: 1

Conall McKeever is an Irish Gaelic footballer who plays for Clan na Gael and the Louth county team. With over 125 appearances, he has been described as one of Louth's most experenced players.

McKeever has been playing since the 2015 season when Colin Kelly managed. He continued to play when Mickey Harte managed and improved the team. McKeever won a Leinster Senior Football Championship title in 2025 when Ger Brennan managed. He went to the 2026 All-Ireland Senior Football Championship semi-final when Gavin Devlin managed.

His father Gerry won the 1985 Louth Senior Football Championship with Clan na Gael, with his uncle Benny captaining the team.
