= Wayne Kierans =

Gaelic football manager

Sport
- Sport: Gaelic football
Club
- Years: Club
- O'Connell's

Wayne Kierans is a Gaelic football manager and former player for O'Connell's and Louth.

Kierans was a selector when Pete McGrath managed the Louth seniors. In 2017, he coached Louth to a first Leinster Minor Football Championship final since 1971, in the second of his two seasons in charge, before taking over the under-20 team in 2018. As manager of Louth's then U20s, he made it known he wanted the Louth manager job in 2018, and he was the first one interviewed for it. His time with the Louth seniors ended in 2020. Players like Bevan Duffy suggested Kierans was not backed by the County Board to continue.

Kierans brought Naomh Fionnbarra, a Junior Championship in 2015. O'Connell's towards the end of the season Kierans left Louth and in 2022, he was appointed as a manager of Killeavy. He stepped down from his role at Killeavy in 2023.

Kierans was named as part of the backroom management team of the Louth minors for 2026.

He is from Castlebellingham, and is married with children.
