= Stefan White =

Louth and Monaghan Gaelic footballer (born 1967)

Sport
- Sport: Gaelic football
- Position: Corner-Forward
Clubs
- Years: Club
- O'Connell's; Castleblaney Faughs; Clan na Gael; Burren; O'Connell's
Inter-county
- Years: County
- 1986-1999: Louth/Monaghan

Stefan White (born 1967) is a retired Gaelic footballer who played in the full-forward line at inter-county level for his native Louth and Monaghan during the 1980s and 1990s.

== Playing career ==
Growing up in Castlebellingham, County Louth as the son of legendary Louth star Stephen White, Stefan played his underage and early adult football with local side O'Connell's. He was part of the O'Connell's Louth Junior Championship winning team of 1983 at the age of 16. He also was selected for the Louth junior county side and in 1985, he won a Leinster Colleges title with his school Dundalk CBS.

In 1986, White moved to Castleblayney in County Monaghan for work purposes and joined the local club Castleblaney Faughs. That same year, Louth manager Mickey Whelan gave him his Championship debut for Louth against Carlow.

White accepted an invitation to declare for Monaghan ahead of the 1987 season and played in that year's Ulster Senior Football Championship. In the Ulster Final of 1988, he came off the bench and scored a point as Monaghan defeated Tyrone on a scoreline of 1–10 to 0–11 at Clones. He started the All-Ireland Semi-Final against Cork, which ended in an eleven-point defeat for Monaghan.

In 1989, he transferred back to Louth and played in the Wee County's Leinster Championship loss to Meath. He continued to play for Castleblaney Faughs until joining Dundalk side Clan na Gael at the start of the 1991 season.

In 1991, his two goals helped Louth defeat a fancied Kildare side, managed by Mick O'Dwyer, in the Leinster Championship quarter-final at Drogheda. He would miss out on a second provincial championship final appearance as Louth were beaten by Laois in a controversial replayed semi-final at Croke Park. Manager Declan Smyth made White captain of Louth for 1992.

In 1993 he lined out at full-forward for Leinster in the Railway Cup final. Ulster triumphed by a three-point margin.

White had resided in County Down for several years and in 1998 he transferred to the Burren club, near Warrenpoint. His inter-county career ended in 1999, when he appeared as a substitute in Louth's Leinster Championship loss to Dublin.

White left Burren in 2003, to rejoin O'Connell's of Castlebellingham, where his football journey began. In 2000, he received a nomination at right full-forward for the Louth Football Team of the Millennium. While he was not selected, his father Stephen was chosen at left half-back.

== Honours ==
Monaghan

- Ulster Senior Football Championship (1): 1988

Louth

- O'Byrne Cup (1): 1990
- National Football League Division Two (1): 1996–97
- All-Ireland Senior B Football Championship (1): 1997

O'Connell's

- Louth Junior Football Championship (1): 1983
- Louth Under-21 Football Championship (1): 1986
- Louth Junior 2 Football League Division 4B (1): 2005

Dundalk CBS

- Leinster Colleges Senior Football Championship (1): 1985

Castleblayney Faughs

- Monaghan Senior Football Championship (3): 1986, 1988, 1990
- Ulster Senior Club Football Championship (1): 1986

Clan na Gael

- Louth Senior Football Championship (2): 1992, 1993
- Louth Senior Football League (5): 1992, 1993, 1994, 1996, 1997
- ACC Cup (3): 1991, 1992, 1993

Preceded by Stephen Melia	Louth Senior Football Captain; 1992	Succeeded by David Reilly
