= 1943 All-Ireland Senior Football Championship =

Football championship

All-Ireland Champions
- Winning team: Roscommon (1st win)
- Captain: Jimmy Murray

All-Ireland Finalists
- Losing team: Cavan
- Captain: Tom O'Reilly

Provincial Champions
- Munster: Cork
- Leinster: Louth
- Ulster: Cavan
- Connacht: Roscommon

Championship statistics

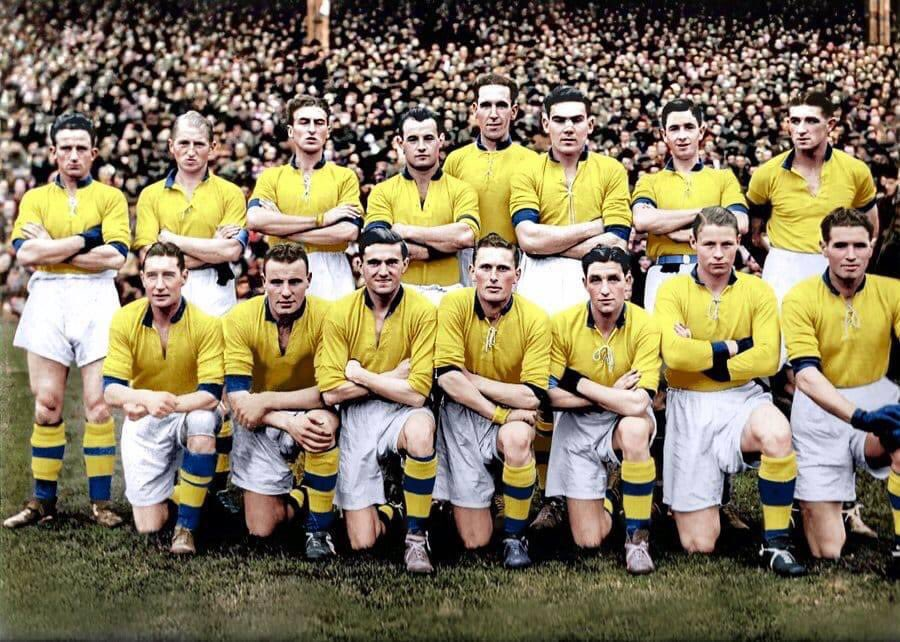
The Roscommon team that won the competition

The 1943 All-Ireland Senior Football Championship was the 57th staging of Ireland's premier Gaelic football knock-out competition.

Limerick return to Munster championship after 2-year absence.

In the Leinster Quarter-Final Louth ended Dublin's year as All-Ireland Champions.

Roscommon were the winners. Kilkenny took part in the Leinster championship for the 1st time since 1931.

== Results ==
=== Connacht Senior Football Championship ===
27 June 1943
Quarter-Final

Leitrim	4–9 – 2–8	Sligo

Boyle

20 June 1943
Semi-Final

Galway	3–6 – 1–5	Mayo
		H Kenny (0–2), J Munnelly (0–1), T Hoban (0–2) & T Acton (1–0).

Kiltimagh
Attendance: 3,000

4 July 1943
Semi-Final

Roscommon	2–12 – 1–3	Leitrim

Carrick-on-Shannon

==== Final ====
18 July 1943
Final

Roscommon	2–8 – 0–8	Galway

St. Coman's Park, Roscommon
Referee: Gerald Courell

=== Leinster Senior Football Championship ===
25 April 1943
Preliminary Round

Carlow	1–11 – 1–10	Wicklow

Enniscorthy

2 May 1943
Preliminary Round

Louth	2–10 – 1–8	Meath

Drogheda Park, Drogheda

9 May 1943
Preliminary Round

Westmeath	1–5 – 2–2	Longford

Cusack Park, Mullingar

9 May 1943
Preliminary Round

Wexford	3–6 – 0–0	Kilkenny

Barrett's Park, New Ross

23 May 1943
Preliminary Round Replay

Longford	2–6 – 1–8	Westmeath

Pearse Park, Longford

16 May 1943
Quarter-Final

Kildare	1–10 – 4–8	Laois
J.Gibbons 1–3, T.Mulhall, J.Farrell 0–2, M.Geraghty, J.Mackey, P.Roche 0–1.

Geraldine Park, Athy

23 May 1943
Quarter-Final

Carlow	2–6 – 2–6	Wexford

Dr. Cullen Park, Carlow

30 May 1943
Quarter-Final

Louth	1–6 – 1–5	Dublin
Peter Corr 0–5 (0-4f), Ray Mooney 1–0, Gerry Devine 0-1f		Tommy Banks 1–2 (0-2f), Jimmy Joy, Paddy Bermingham, Paddy O'Connor 0–1 each

Drogheda Park, Drogheda

6 June 1943
Quarter-Final Replay

Carlow	1–7 – 1–1	Wexford

Wexford Park, Wexford

6 June 1943
Quarter-Final

Offaly	2–11 – 2–9	Longford

O'Connor Park, Tullamore

20 June 1943
Semi-Final

Louth	1–9 – 2–3	Offaly

Croke Park, Dublin
Referee: P Dunne

27 June 1943
Semi-Final

Laois	3–8 – 3–6	Carlow

Geraldine Park, Athy

==== Final ====
25 July 1943

Louth	3-16–2-04	Laois
Peter Corr 1-8 (0-6f), Jimmy Coyle 2-0, Larry Carr 0-5, Jim Thornton, Kevin Connolly, Oliver Halpin 0-1 each		Danny Douglas and Syd Harkins 1–0 each, Chris Delaney 0-3f, Bill Delaney 0–1

Croke Park, Dublin
Referee: Paddy Mythen (Wexford)

GK	1	Joe Halpenny (St Mary's)
RCB	2	Larry Waller (Dundalk Young Irelands)
FB	3	Eddie Boyle (Seán McDermott's, Dublin)
LCB	4	Seán Boyle (St Mary's)
RHB	5	Jack Regan (Dundalk Gaels) (c)
CHB	6	Jim Quigley (Dundalk Young Irelands)
LHB	7	Tom Clarke (Cooley Kickhams)
MF	8	Gerry Devine (St Magdalene's)
MF	9	Jim Thornton (Cooley Kickhams)
RHF	10	Kevin Connolly (Cooley Kickhams)
CHF	11	Larry Carr (Oliver Plunketts)
LHF	12	Peter Corr (Seán O'Mahony's)
RCF	13	Mick Hardy (Cooley Kickhams)
FF	14	Jimmy Coyle (Seán McDermott's, Dublin)
LCF	15	Ollie Halpin (St Magdalene's)

GK	1	Jim McCartney (Graiguecullen)
RCB	2	Tommy Walsh (Stradbally)
FB	3	Paddy Kelly (Stradbally)
LCB	4	Mick Shortall (Annanough)
RHB	5	Benny Hunt (Portarlington)
CHB	6	Mick Delaney (Stradbally)
LHB	7	Jim Slater (Graiguecullen)
MF	8	Tommy Murphy (Graiguecullen)
MF	9	Jack Cowley (Graiguecullen)
RHF	10	Danny Douglas (Army Metro, Dublin)
CHF	11	Bill Delaney (Stradbally)
LHF	12	Bill Brennan (Flemings Fireclay)
RCF	13	Syd Harkins (Portlaoise)
FF	14	Chris Delaney (Stradbally)
LCF	15	Tom Haughney (Graiguecullen)
Substitutes:
	16	John Lalor (Jamestown) for Shortall
	17	Morgan Delaney (Stradbally) for Mick Delaney

=== Munster Senior Football Championship ===
16 May 1943
Quarter-Final

Tipperary	2–7 – 0–9	Waterford

Ned Hall Park, Clonmel
Referee: P. J. O'Sullivan ( T )

23 May 1943
Quarter-Final

Clare	2–10 – 2–4	Limerick

Foynes

6 June 1943
Semi-Final

Cork	0–9 – 0–9	Kerry
E. Young (0–3), J. Aherne (1–0) & J. Cronin (1–0).		Pat Holly (0–1), Joe Kennington (0–1), Murt Kelly (0–5), Jimmy Gawksie O'Gorman (0–1) & Mikey Lyne (0–1).

Cork Athletic Grounds, Cork

20 June 1943
Semi-Final

Tipperary	3–5 – 2–6	Clare

Gaelic Grounds, Limerick
Referee: B. Scannell (Galway)

11 July 1943
Semi-Final Replay

Cork	1–5 – 1–4	Kerry
E. Casey (0–3) & J. Aherne (0–2).		Paddy Kennedy (0–1), Johnny Walsh (0–1), Tom Gega O'Connor (1–0) & Murt Kelly (0–2).

Cork Athletic Grounds, Cork

==== Final ====
25 July 1943
Final

Cork	1–7 – 1–4	Tipperary
E. Young (0–1), E. Casey (0–2), P. Cronin (0–1). J. Cronin (0–1) & J. Aherne (1–0).

Páirc MacGearailt, Fermoy
Referee: T. Greaney (W)

=== Ulster Senior Football Championship ===
20 June 1943
Quarter-Final

Donegal	0–7 – 1–8	Tyrone

Omagh

27 June 1943
Quarter-Final

Monaghan	3–8 – 3–4	Armagh

Athletic Grounds, Armagh

27 June 1943
Quarter-Final

Antrim	0–13 – 1–8	Down

Corrigan Park, Belfast

4 July 1943
Semi-Final

Cavan	4–10 – 1–3	Tyrone

Brewster Park, Enniskillen

11 July 1943
Semi-Final

Monaghan	1–10 – 1–5	Antrim

Athletic Grounds, Armagh

==== Final ====
1 August 1943
Final

Cavan	2–3 – 0–5	Monaghan

Breffni Park, Cavan
Attendance: 7,000

=== All-Ireland Senior Football Championship ===
8 August 1943
Semi-Final

Roscommon	3–10 – 3–6	Louth

Croke Park, Dublin
Attendance: 18,347

15 August 1943
Semi-Final

Cavan	1–8 – 1–7	Cork
		F. O’Donavan (0–1), D. O’Connor (0–1), J. Lynch (0–2), J. Cronin (1–1) & J. Aherne (0–2).

Croke Park, Dublin
Attendance: 30,322

==== Finals ====
26 September 1943
Final

Roscommon	1–6 – 1–6	Cavan
P. Marray (0–3), J. Murray (1–0), D. Keenan (0–2) & L. Gilmartin (0–1).		J. Stafford (1–3), S. Maguire, J.J. O'Reilly & P, Smith (0–1) each.

Croke Park, Dublin
Attendance: 68,023
Referee: Patrick McKenna (Limerick)

10 October 1943
Final Replay

Roscommon	2–7 – 2–2	Cavan
D. Kennan (0–5), F. Kinlough (1–1), J. McQullain (1–0) & P. Murray (0–1).		J. Stafford & P. Boylan (1–0) & T. O'Reilly & J.J. O'Reilly (0–1) each.

Croke Park, Dublin
Attendance: 47,193
Referee: P O Miotain (Wexford)

== Championship statistics ==
=== Miscellaneous ===
- The Wexford vs Kilkenny game was Kilkenny's first game since 1931 as they rejoin the Leinster football championship.
- Louth win the Leinster championship for the first time since 1912.
- Cork won their first Munster title since 1928.
- Roscommon won the All-Ireland title for the first time ever becoming the third county from Connacht after Galway in 1925 and then Mayo in 1936 to do so; Roscommon also won a first Connacht title since 1914.
- There were a number of first-time championship meetings: The complete All-Ireland Series from the semi-finals of Roscommon vs Louth, Cavan vs Cork and the final between Roscommon and Cavan were all the first championship meetings of the teams.
- The All-Ireland final ended in a draw and went to a replay for the first time since 1938.
