= Leslie Toal =

Irish Gaelic football player and hurler

Personal information
- Born: 1943 (age 82–83) Dundalk, County Louth

Sport
Clubs
- Years: Club
- Clan na Gael; Naomh Moninne
Inter-county
- Years: County
- 1961–1978 1968–1978: Louth football Louth hurling

Leslie Toal is a retired Irish Gaelic footballer who played as a defender for the Louth senior football team and at club level with Clan na Gael. He also represented his county in hurling for several years.

== Playing career ==
Toal's inter-county football career began with the Louth junior side while still a teenager. He was a member of the panel that progressed to the final of the 1961 All-Ireland Junior Football Championship. He appeared as a substitute as Louth overcame Yorkshire by 3 points. Promoted to the county senior squad in 1962, he went on to have a lengthy career with Louth. In 1968, he was selected by Leinster and lined out for his province at centre-half back in that year's Railway Cup final. After his football career ended, he served as a selector for the Louth football team.

His hurling career brought him five Louth County Championship medals. At inter-county level, he won two All-Ireland Junior Hurling Championship medals and one Leinster Junior Hurling Championship medal.

== Coaching career ==
As a manager with his local club Clan na Gael, he won the Louth Senior Football Championship twice, and a League and Championship Double in 1987. He also coached Dundalk secondary schools' teams to three Leinster senior football titles.

== Honours ==
Club

- Cardinal O'Donnell Cup (1): 1982
- ACC Cup (2): 1979, 1982
- Louth Senior Hurling Championship (5): 1967, 1970, 1973, 1974, 1976

County

- All-Ireland Junior Football Championship (1): 1961
- All-Ireland Junior Hurling Championship (2): 1976, 1977
- Leinster Junior Hurling Championship (1): 1973
- O'Byrne Cup (1): 1963

As manager/coach

- Louth Senior Football Championship (2): 1985, 1987
- Cardinal O'Donnell Cup (1): 1987
- Drogheda and Dundalk Dairies Shield (1): 1981 (with Lann Léire)
- Louth Junior Football Championship (1): 1973 (with Seán O'Mahony's)
- Louth Junior 2 Football Championship (1): 1981 (with Seán O'Mahony's)
- Leinster Colleges Senior Football Championship (3): 1985, 2002, 2011

Sporting positions
Preceded by Danny Nugent	Louth Senior Football Captain; 1974	Succeeded by Benny Gaughran
