= Jim Quigley =

Louth Gaelic footballer and Manager

Personal information
- Native name: Séamus Ó Coigligh (Irish)
- Nickname: Sogger
- Born: 1919 Dundalk, County Louth
- Died: 4 October 2005 (aged 86)

Sport
- Sport: Gaelic football
- Position: Centre half-forward
Club
- Years: Club
- Dundalk Young Irelands
Club titles
- Louth titles: 6
Inter-county
- Years: County
- 1939–1949: Louth
Inter-county titles
- Leinster titles: 2
- All-Irelands: 1

Jim Quigley (1919 – 4 October 2005) was an Irish Gaelic footballer who played for his local club Dundalk Young Irelands, the Louth county team and Leinster. He later served as manager of his county and was in charge when Louth defeated Cork in the final of the 1957 All-Ireland Senior Football Championship.

Quigley was a member of the Louth panel that won the All-Ireland Minor Football Championship in 1936. After graduating to senior level he went on to win the Leinster Senior Football Championship twice with Louth, captaining the team in 1948.

In 1959 he trained Dundalk side Clan na Gael to a Louth Senior Football Championship title.

He was chosen at centre half-forward on the Louth team of the Millennium in February 2000.

Quigley died in October 2005 after a long illness.

== Honours ==
=== Dundalk Young Irelands ===
- Louth Senior Football Championship: (6): 1938, 1940, 1941, 1944, 1947, 1950
- Louth Senior Football League (5): 1938, 1939, 1940, 1941, 1948
- Louth Junior Football Championship: (1): 1937

=== Louth ===
- All-Ireland Senior Football Championship (1): 1957
- Leinster Senior Football Championship (2): 1943, 1948
- All-Ireland Minor Football Championship (1): 1936

=== Leinster ===
- Railway Cup (1): 1944

Sporting positions
Preceded by	Louth Senior Football Captain; 1941-42	Succeeded by Jack Regan
Preceded by	Louth Senior Football Captain; 1948	Succeeded by Seán Boyle
