= Gavin Devlin =

Irish Gaelic football player and coach

Personal information
- Native name: Gábháin Ó Doibhilin (Irish)
- Nickname: Horse
- Born: County Tyrone, Northern Ireland
- Occupation: Building contractor
- Height: 6 ft 0 in (183 cm)

Sport
- Sport: Gaelic football
- Position: Half back
Club
- Years: Club
- ? -present: Ardboe
Club titles
- Tyrone titles: 1
Inter-county
- Years: County
- Tyrone
Inter-county titles
- Ulster titles: 3
- All-Irelands: 2

Gavin Devlin is a Gaelic football coach, selector, manager and former player. He has been manager of the Louth county team since 2025. Devlin played for the Ardboe club and the Tyrone county team, winning two All-Ireland SFC titles with Tyrone. He then worked as Mickey Harte's assistant and selector at both Tyrone and Louth.

== Playing career ==
Devlin won one All-Ireland Minor Championship (1998) and two All-Ireland Under 21 Championship titles in 2000 and 2001.

He won two All-Ireland SFC medals; in 2003, playing a pivotal role in Tyrone's blanket defence system, and as a panel member in 2005.

== Coaching career ==
Devlin has coached Kildress Wolfe Tones Seniors in Tyrone.

He assisted Mickey Harte during the end of his tenure as Tyrone senior manager, then moved with him to Louth. When working together during their single season with Derry, Harte said of coach/selector/assistant Devlin: "He is as good as another son to me".

Ten months after leaving Louth, Devlin returned there as "underage football development coordinator, with a remit of steering the county's academy squads, post-primary and rising stars programme", according to Louth GAA.

He was thus not in a position to link up with Harte when Harte joined Offaly. Devlin was appointed manager of the Louth senior footballers in 2025, following Ger Brennan's departure.

Preceded by Ger Brennan	Louth Senior Football Manager; 2025–	Succeeded by Incumbent
