= Ollie Halpin =

Personal information
- Full name: Oliver Plunkett Halpin
- Nickname: Ollie
- Born: 30 May 1920 George's Street, Drogheda, County Louth, Ireland
- Died: 16 September 1990 (aged 70) Drogheda, County Louth, Ireland

Sport
- Sport: Gaelic football
Club
- Years: Club
- 1937-1945: St Magdalene's
Inter-county
- Years: County
- 1939-1944: Louth

Oliver "Ollie" Halpin (30 May 1920 – 16 September 1990) was an Irish Gaelic footballer and amateur actor. He played his club football with St Magdalene's GFC in Drogheda, County Louth, and represented Louth at senior level. He was a member of the Louth team that won the Leinster Senior Football Championship in 1943 and subsequently reached the All-Ireland semi-final. He also represented Leinster in the Railway Cup and won a medal in 1944.

Halpin was selected on the Louth Team of the Millennium in 2000.

He was also a prominent figure in Drogheda amateur theatre, particularly through his association with St Philomena's Drama Group, with which he won an All-Ireland drama trophy in 1953.

== Early life ==
Halpin was born in Drogheda on 30 May 1920, the son of Thomas Halpin and Agnes Halpin (née Leech). His father was a noted hurler with John Mitchels and was murdered by the Black and Tans in 1921.

Halpin was educated locally by the Christian Brothers and subsequently attended the local technical school. He joined the staff of Cement Ltd., Drogheda, in 1939, where he worked as a draughtsman.

== Gaelic football career ==
Halpin played his club football with St Magdalene's in Drogheda. He won a Louth Junior Football Championship medal in 1942, when St Magdalene's defeated Geraldines in the final. A later account described him as a versatile and powerfully built forward who was capable of playing in any of the six forward positions.

Halpin made his Louth senior championship debut in 1939. He was a member of the Louth team that won the Leinster Senior Football Championship in 1943, defeating Laois in the final. Halpin played at left corner-forward and scored 0–1 in the match.

Louth subsequently reached the All-Ireland semi-final, where they were defeated by Roscommon. Halpin played at left corner-forward in the match.

In 1944, Halpin was selected to represent Leinster in the Railway Cup. Leinster defeated Ulster by 1-10 to 1-03 in the final at Croke Park on St Patrick's Day, with Halpin among the Louth players on the winning side. Ollie was one of five Louthmen representing their province, Jim Thornton of Cooley Kickhams captained Leinster, also Paddy Larkin, Jim Quigley (Dundalk Young Irelands), Eddie Boyle (Cooley Kickhams) and Ollie Halpin of St Magdalene's.

At club level, St Magdalene's reached the Louth Senior Football Championship final in 1945, where they were defeated by Gaels.

Halpin also participated in other sports. In 1947 he played association football with Dundalk FC, and he also played rugby with Drogheda Rugby Club.

== Team of the Millennium ==
In 2000, Halpin was selected on the Louth Team of the Millennium at right corner-forward. The team was selected from 75 nominees to represent the county's most distinguished footballers from the foundation of the Gaelic Athletic Association to the year 2000.

Halpin was the only player from Drogheda selected on the team. He was one of six members of Louth's 1943 team selected on the Team of the Millennium.

== Amateur theatre ==
Halpin joined St Philomena's Drama Group in 1945, three years after its foundation. He became one of the group's leading actors and subsequently served as vice-president and president.

In 1953, Halpin was a member of the St Philomena's production of Maura Laverty's Tolka Row, which won the All-Ireland Drama Tostal Trophy at Athlone. The production was reported to have finished only three marks short of a perfect score, and Halpin was pictured among the winning cast.

A profile in The Argus later that month described Halpin as one of Drogheda's leading amateur actors. It noted his performances in leading and character roles and his appearances in local pantomime, where he had established a reputation as a comedian.

By October 1955, Halpin was described as the group's leading man and vice-president. He had received an individual award from the Louth Drama Festival for his performance in Uncle Harry.

Halpin was also involved in the selection of plays, casting and directing. According to a later obituary, he won two Best Actor awards at the Louth and Meath Drama Festivals.

== Personal life ==
Halpin married Maureen Williams. They had four daughters, Doreen, Anne, Geri and Maeve.

Halpin died on 16 September 1990, aged 70.
