= Ger Brennan =

Dublin Gaelic footballer

Personal information
- Native name: Gearóid Ó Braonáin (Irish)
- Born: Dublin, Ireland
- Occupation: Teacher
- Height: 1.83 m (6 ft 0 in)

Sport
- Sport: Gaelic football
- Position: Centre-back
Club
- Years: Club
- St Vincents
Club titles
- Dublin titles: 3
- Leinster titles: 3
- All-Ireland Titles: 2
Inter-county**
Years	County	Apps (scores)
2006–2015	Dublin	27 (0–5)
Inter-county titles
- Leinster titles: 5
- All-Irelands: 2
- NFL: 1
- All Stars: 1
- **Inter County team apps and scores correct as of 23 August 2014.

Ger Brennan is an Irish Gaelic football coach, manager and former player for St Vincents and the Dublin county team. He was manager of the Louth county team between 2023 and 2025. He was appointed as the new manager of the Dublin senior football team in August 2025.

== Early life ==
From a family of nine, he attended Belvedere College.

Graduating from Maynooth College with undergraduate and master's degrees, he qualified as a school teacher and taught Irish and religion at St Kevin's College, Ballygall Road, in Dublin 11. In November 2015, he was appointed Gaelic Games Executive at University College Dublin.

== Playing career ==
=== Club ===
Brennan won his first Dublin Senior Football Championship medal with St Vincents in 2007 in the final against St Brigid's at Parnell Park. The team then went on to win the Leinster Senior Club Football Championship final against Tyrrellspass of Westmeath. Brennan was chosen as the Leinster club player of the year for his performances with St Vincents.

Brennan won the 2008 All-Ireland Senior Club Football Championship with St Vincents in a hard-fought game. He won the Dublin Senior Football Championship with St Vincents, as captain, in 2013.

=== Inter-county ===
Brennan made his national league debut for Dublin against Tyrone on 3 February 2007. He was a member of the Dublin team that won the 2007 O'Byrne Cup, playing against Laois at O'Connor Park in Offaly. The game finished on a scoreline of 1–18 to 2–13. He finished the tournament with a total of 0–4.

In 2008, he retired from Dublin's football panel, citing burnout and fatigue as his reasons. However, on 30 July 2008, he was named in Dublin's panel for the quarter-final and accepted a return. He was part of the Dublin panel that won the 2011 All-Ireland Senior Football Championship (SFC) title. He won a second All-Ireland SFC title with Dublin in 2013, scoring two points in the final against Mayo.

In October 2015, Brennan announced his retirement from inter-county football, but he continued to play club football.

== Coaching ==
In August 2020, Brennan was announced as Carlow's head coach after Niall Carew took over as manager.

On 2 October 2023, he was appointed manager of the Louth county team.

In May 2025, Louth won a first Leinster SFC title in 68 years after a 3–14 to 1–18 win against Meath in the final.

On 1 July 2025, he left his position as Louth manager after two seasons in charge.

In August 2025, Brennan was appointed as the new manager of the Dublin senior football team on a three-year term.

== Personal life ==
Brennan is a Catholic who has spoken about his faith in God. He has stated that while non-denominational schools may teach subjects such as science, Catholic schools "enable young students to have the skills to pray".

Brennan was praised for his "nonchalant delivery" of thanks to the "girlfriends and boyfriends of the players" after St Vincent's defeated Castlebar Mitchels in the 2014 All-Ireland Club Championship Final at Croke Park (a speech delivered in front of a live television audience). However just over a year later, Brennan wrote an op-ed for the Irish Independent arguing against the legalisation of same-sex marriage in that year's Marriage Equality referendum, which was ultimately carried in a 62% to 38% popular vote. His stance was criticised by others, including fellow GAA star Conor Cusack.

He is a nephew of former Ireland association football international Fran Brennan.

Preceded by Mickey Harte	Louth Senior Football Manager; 2023–2025	Succeeded by Gavin Devlin
Preceded by Dessie Farrell	Dublin Senior Football Manager; 2025–present	Succeeded by Incumbent
