= Dundalk Young Irelands GFC =

Louth-based Gaelic games club

Dundalk Young Irelands
- Éire Óg, Dún Dealgan
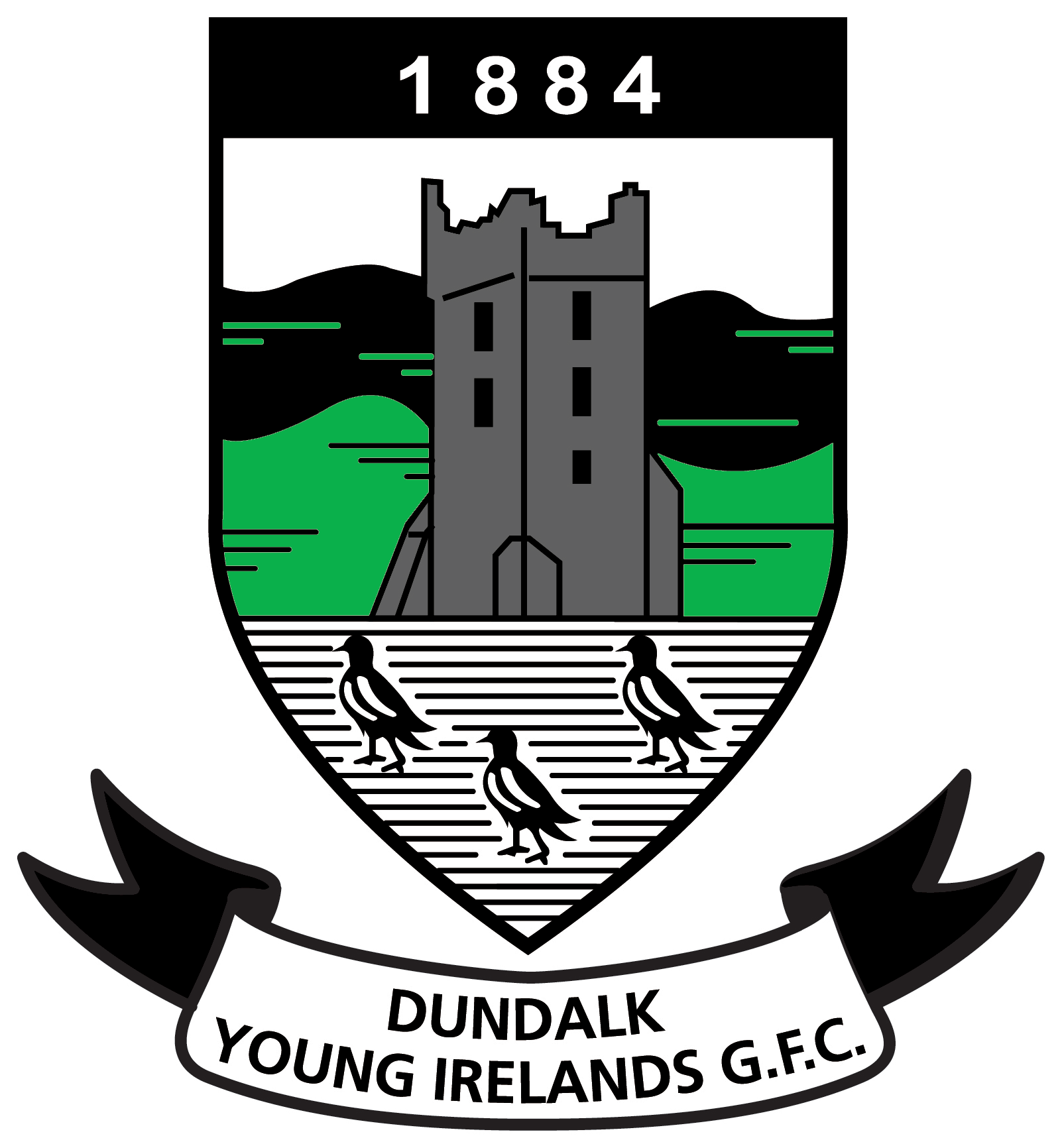
- Founded: 1884
- County: Louth
- Nickname: The Irelanders
- Colours: Green and black
- Grounds: Páirc Éire Óg
- Coordinates: 53.98989°N 6.39149°W; Website: dyi.ie

Playing kits
Standard colours

Senior Club Championships
	All Ireland	Leinster champions	Louth champions
Football:	-	-	11

Dundalk Young Irelands GFC is a GAA club from Dundalk, County Louth, which fields Gaelic football teams in competitions organised by the Louth county board. The club was formed in the same year as the Gaelic Athletic Association, making it the oldest club in Louth and one of the oldest in Ireland.

== History ==
The club was founded in 1884 by members of the Dundalk Young Ireland literary and debating Society. A team was entered in the inaugural Louth Senior Football Championship of 1887 which went on to win the competition, defeating Dowdallshill in the final on a scoreline of 0–03 to 0–02. The All-Ireland Senior Football Championship was also held for the first time that year. As county champions, Young Irelands represented Louth and reached the final after wins over the champions of Waterford and Wexford. They lost the final to Limerick Commercials on a scoreline of 1–04 to 0–03, at Beech Hill in Dublin.

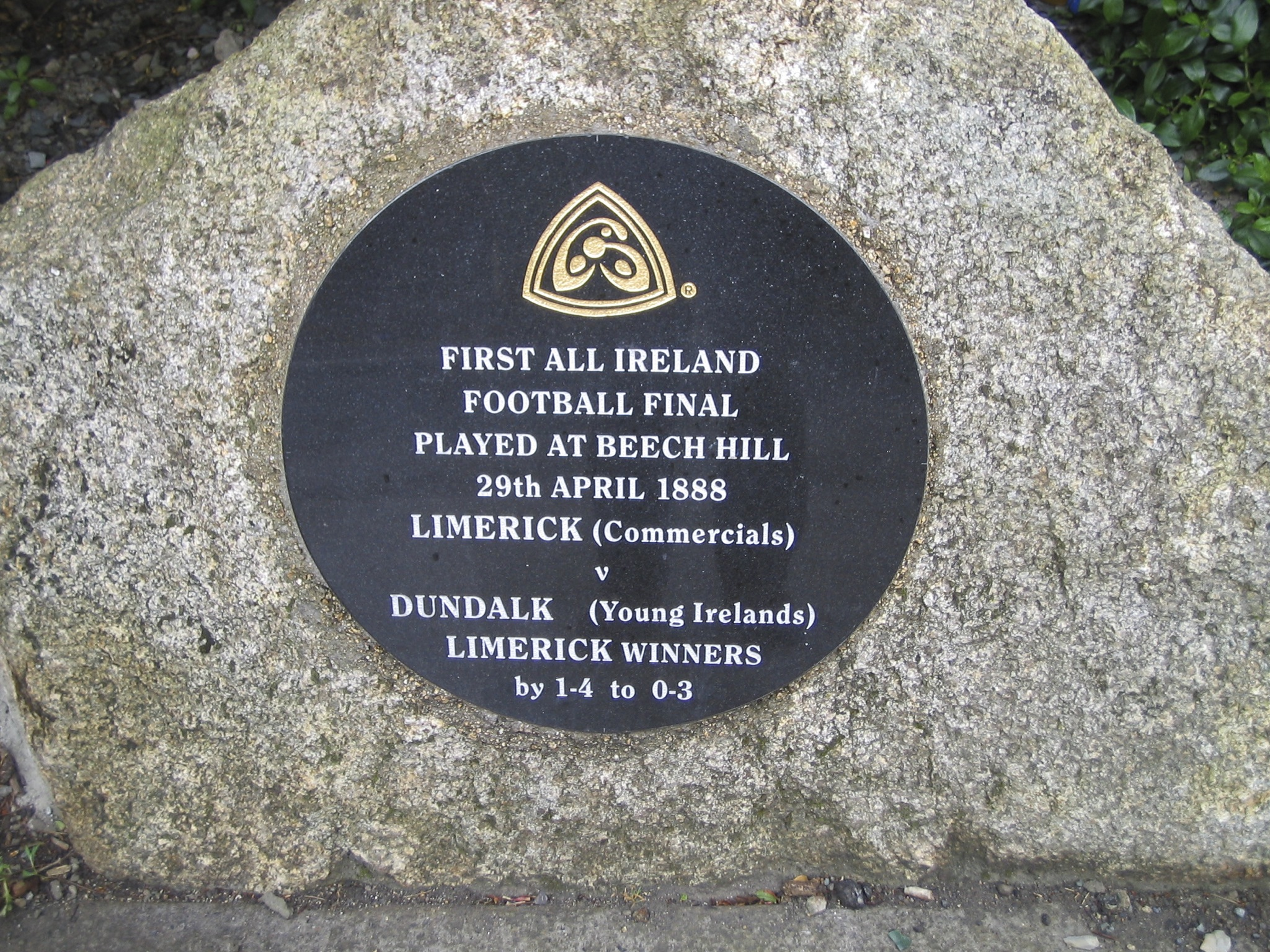
The Beech Hill field in Donnybrook, where the 1887 All-Ireland Final was played

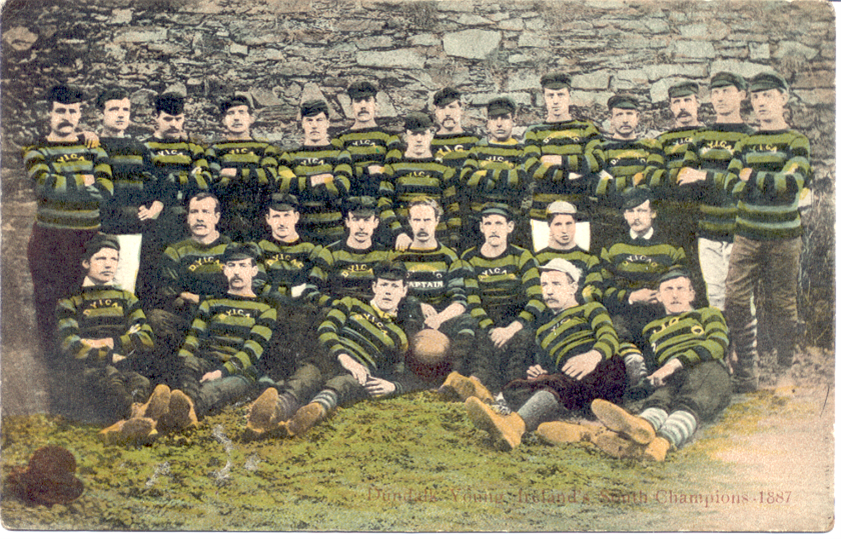
Young Irelands team – 1887 All-Ireland finalists and Louth champions

Charles McAlester was a key figure in the early years of the club and county GAA organisation. He was the first secretary of the Louth County Board (1887–88), organising secretary of Dundalk Young Irelands (1885–August 1886), and later served as club secretary (1886–87; 1890–91) and chairman (1903–05; 1909–13). McAlester also played on the Young Irelands team that won the inaugural Louth Senior Football Championship in 1887.

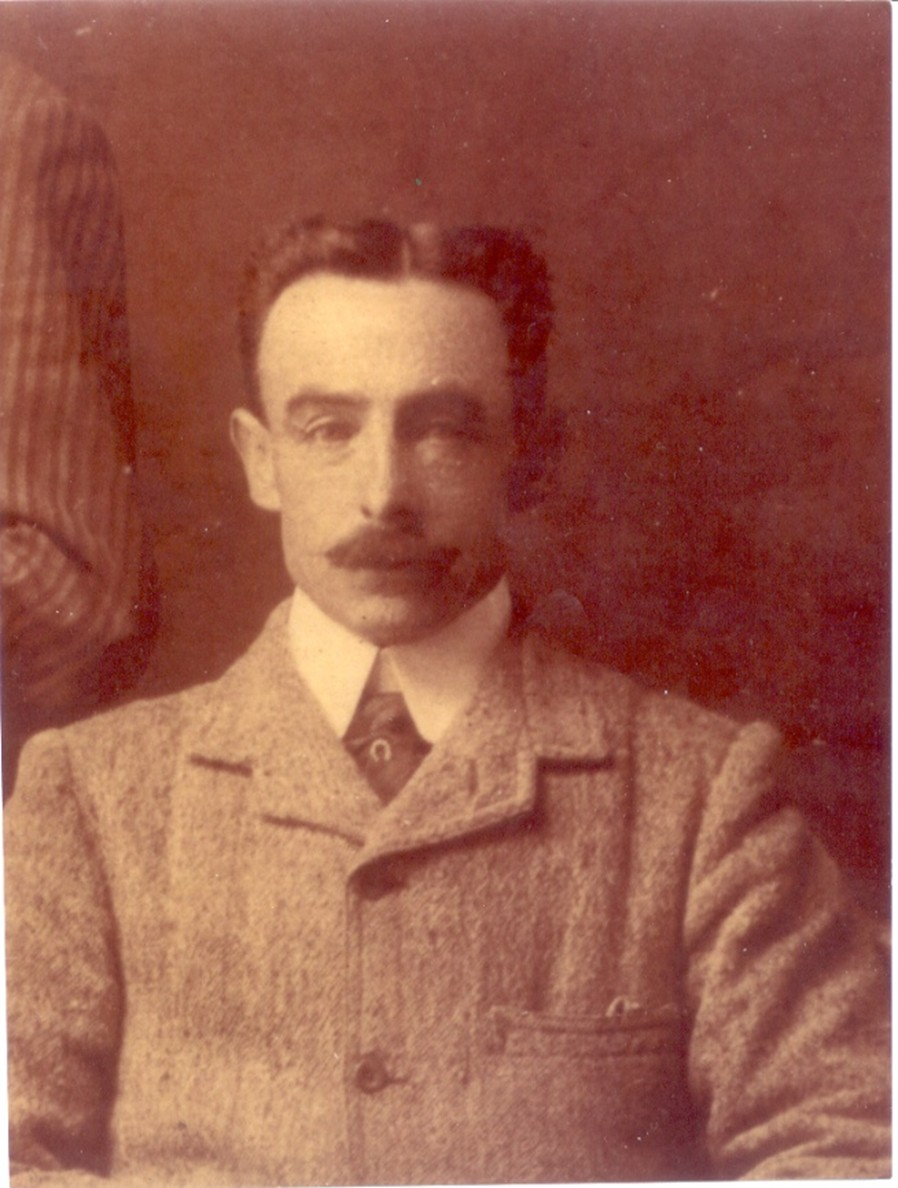
Charles McAlester — club secretary, chairman and player during the club’s early history

In 1903, Dundalk Young Irelands became the first-ever winners of the Louth Senior Football League, further cementing their status as one of the county's early dominant clubs.

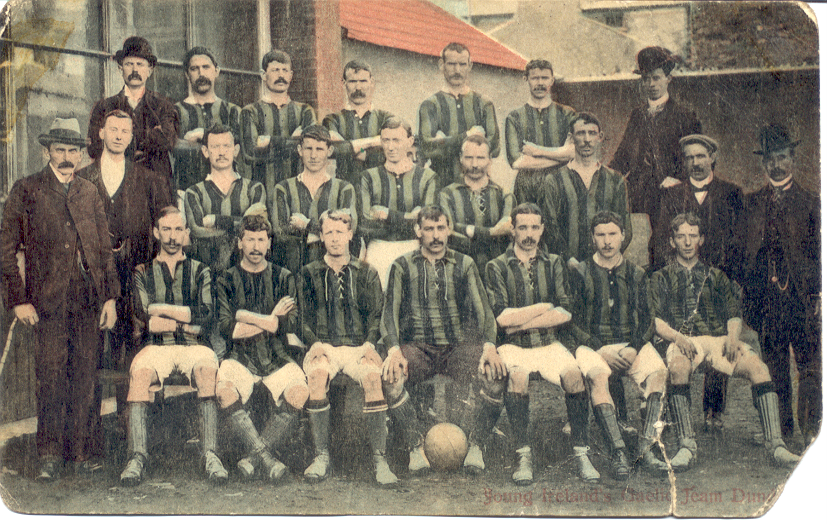
Dundalk Young Irelands team, first-ever winners of the Louth Senior Football League in 1903

The Irelanders were senior champions twice more in the early years of the next century, with victories against Tredaghs of Drogheda in 1905 and Geraldines in 1911.

Joe Ward represented Young Irelands at administrative level in Louth GAA. He was Chairman of the county board in 1910 and again from 1917 to 1920. One of three Louth selectors in 1910 for the county's first All-Ireland Senior Football Championship success. He is credited with the introduction of the red jersey as part of the uniform of Louth inter-county teams. His service to Louth GAA was recognized with the posthumous dedication of the Joe Ward Cup in his honour, for the winners of the Louth Senior Football Championship.

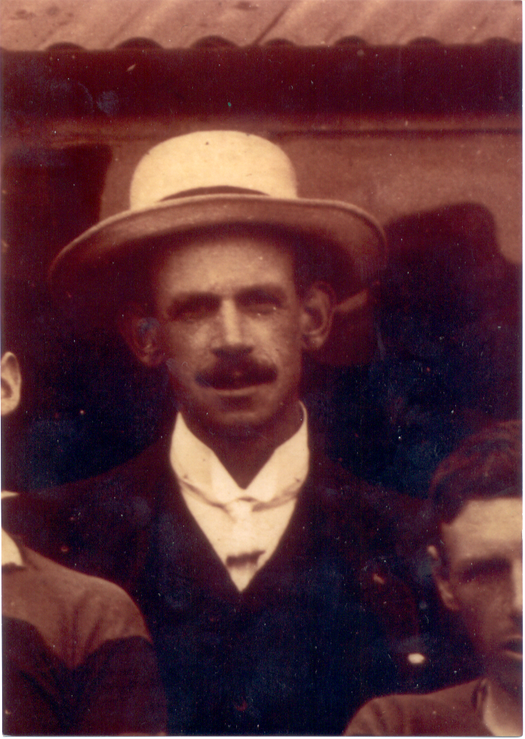
Joe Ward of Dundalk Young Irelands

A period in the junior ranks of Louth football was to follow for the club, ending with a defeat of Darver Young Irelands in the Louth Junior Football Championship final of 1937. In 1938, the Irelanders won both the Louth Senior Football Championship and the Cardinal O'Donnell Cup, thus completing a rare 'Double' of Senior League and Championship. Back-to-back senior championship titles followed in 1940 and 1941, with defeats of Cooley Kickhams and Dundalk Gaels respectively. The Double was won again in both years. Future county team manager Jim Quigley captained the Irelanders to another championship win over Cooley Kickhams in 1944 and again in 1947 when they clinched a ninth senior title, with a replay win against Owen Roe's of Drogheda.

1950 was an outstanding year for Young Irelands as both the senior and junior teams would win their respective championships. The seniors triumphed over St Magdalene's of Drogheda after a replay on a scoreline of 0–08 to 0–05, while the junior side defeated Dowdallshill by a point, 2–01 to 0–06. There would be no more championship success for the Irelanders in the 1950s, although they did manage to win the Old Gaels cup in 1957.

1957 was another memorable year for the club, as three of their players started on the Louth side that won the 1957 All-Ireland Senior Football Championship Final against Cork and the victorious team were trained by former Irelanders' captain Jim Quigley.

Challenging times would lie ahead as the Dundalk municipal Athletic Grounds – where the club played their home matches – was sold in 1960 to Clarks, who built a shoe factory on the site. Young Irelands’ fortunes declined considerably in the 1960s to the point where they were unable to enter teams in competitions. The Irelanders were now effectively homeless, until the local Marist Fathers allowed the club to use the grounds of their secondary school for training and playing purposes. The club decided to rebuild at junior level and focus on youth development.

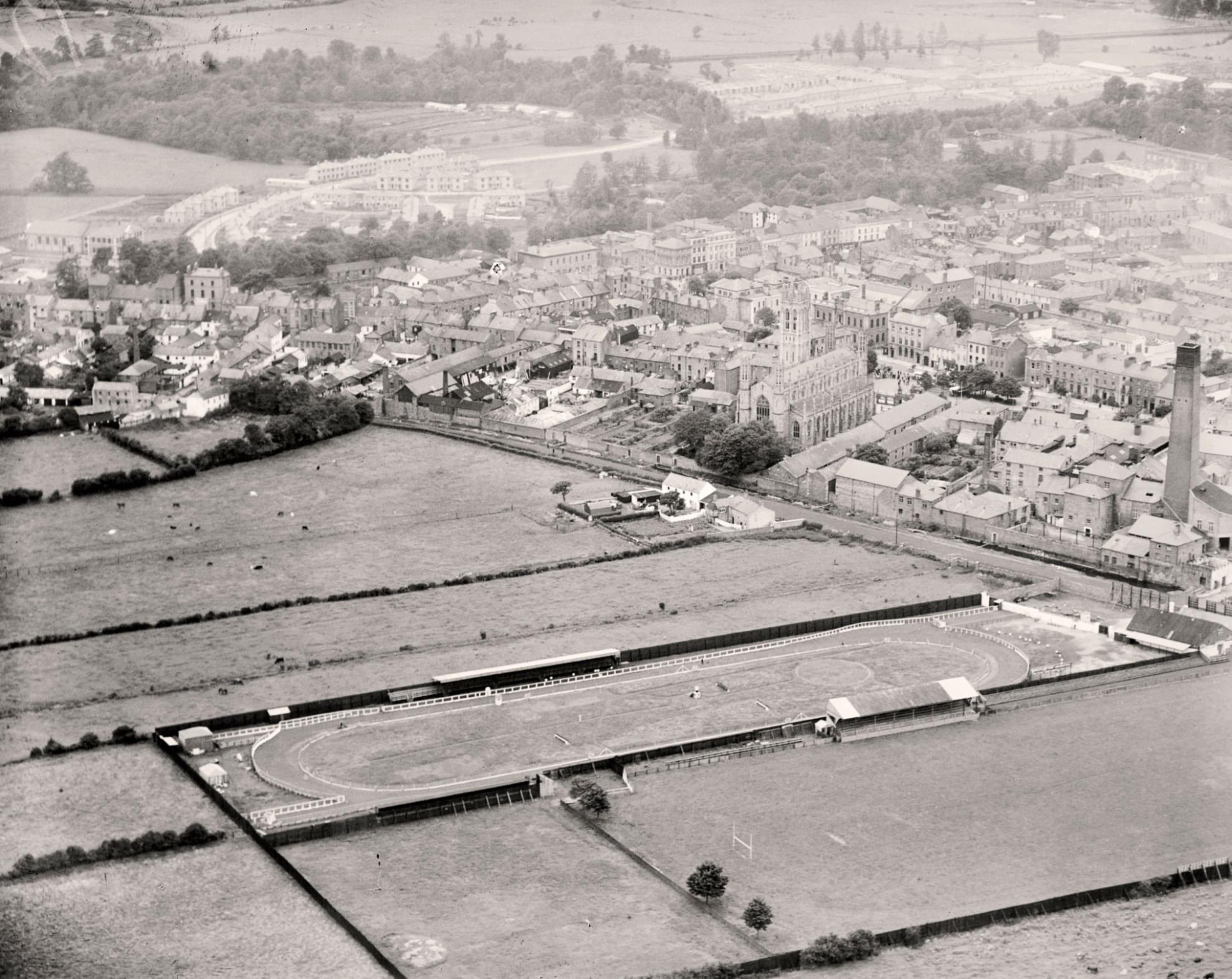
Former Athletic Grounds with St Patrick's Church in background

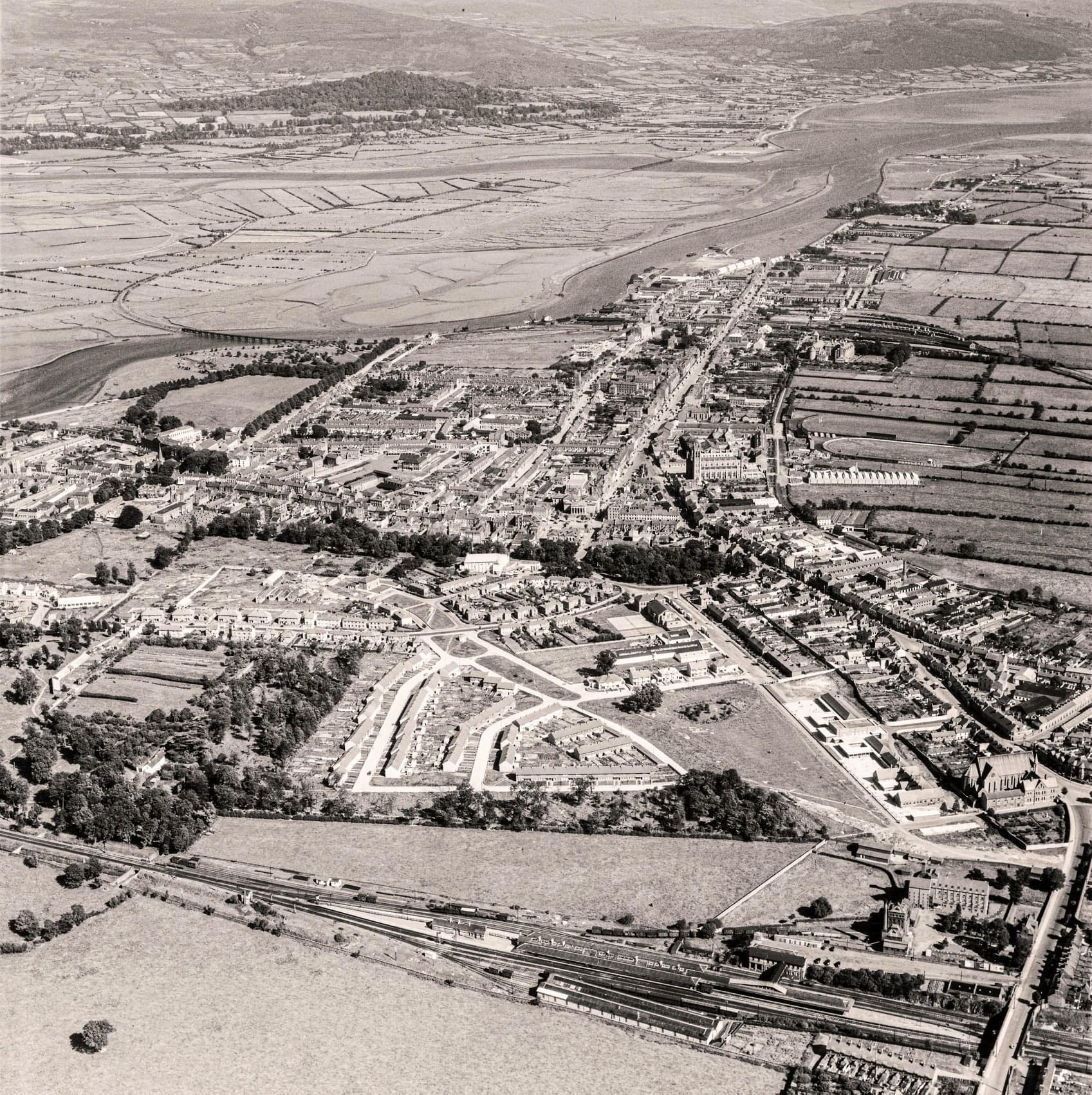
Another view with St Patrick's Church to the left

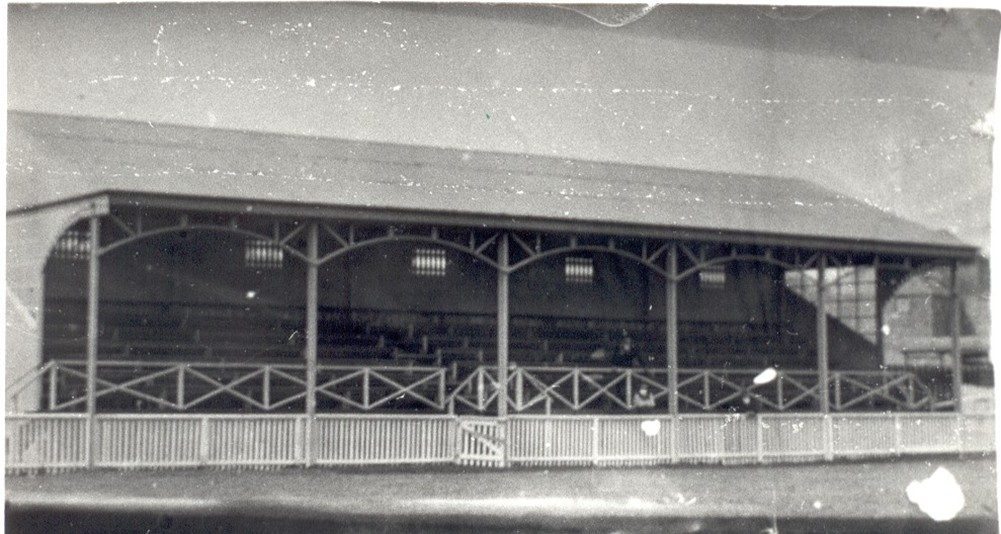
The old Athletic Grounds stand

In 1977 the Irelanders won their third Junior Championship title, beating Oliver Plunketts 1–12 to 0–06 in the final at Knockbridge. Now back in senior football, their success continued in 1978 as the club won the Cardinal O'Donnell Cup with a 1–11 to 0–04 victory over Ardee St Mary's in the league final at Louth Village. 1978 was also the year that Louth would win their second Leinster Under-21 title, with victory against Offaly in the final. The club had three representatives on the panel – Séamus Haughey, Larry Goodman and Michael McCabe. Louth were narrowly beaten in the All-Ireland semi-final by Kerry at the Gaelic Grounds, 2–10 to 0–14.

In 1979 the Irelanders reached the final of the senior championship for the first time since 1950, where they met Cooley Kickhams at St Brigid's Park. Then the dominant side in Louth football, Cooley were expected to win a 4th consecutive title. Young Irelands, however, outscored them by three points (0–11 to 1–05) to take home the Joe Ward Cup. The team returned to the county final again in 1980 at Ardee but were upset by Roche Emmets on a scoreline of 2–03 to 0–06.

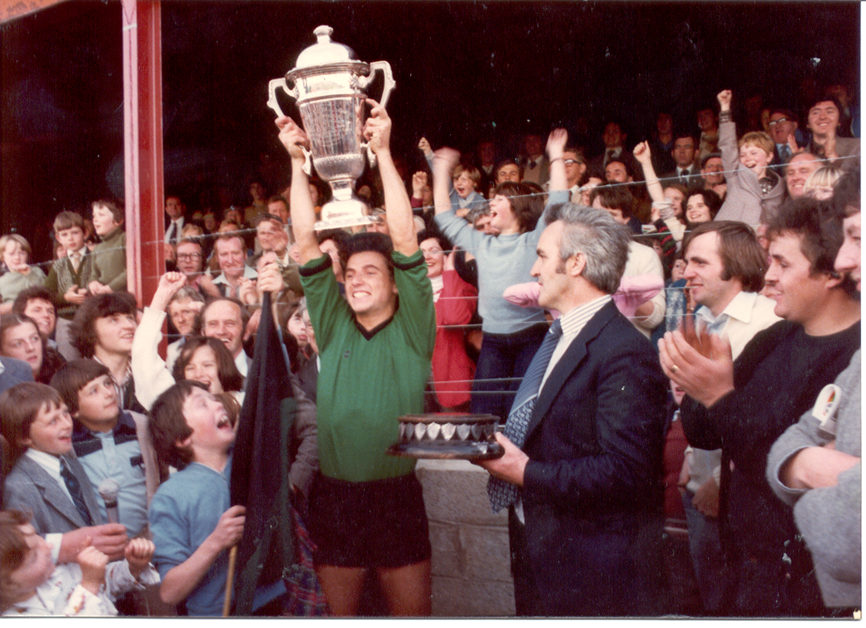
Presentation of the Joe Ward Cup to Dundalk Young Irelands captain in 1979

1981 would see Louth clinch a third provincial title at the Under-21 grade. Once again there was Young Irelands' involvement, as the side was captained by midfielder Pat McConnon. Goalkeeper Eugene McArdle and right half-back Kieran Maguire joined him on the team. Longford were defeated in the decider by 2–08 to 0–06. Galway would prove too strong for the Wee County in the All-Ireland semi-final.

The Irelanders remained competitive throughout the Eighties without winning further league or championship honours. Their long-standing aim of having a permanent ground of their own was achieved in 1983, when a plot of land was purchased in Upper Marshes, Dundalk from the local council. Páirc Éire Óg staged its first competitive match in 1989. Competing at intermediate level in the early 1990s, the club reached championship finals in 1991 and 1993 but lost both times, to Dundalk Gaels and Hunterstown Rovers respectively. In 1996, they made it third time lucky with a 0–14 to 1–08 win over Naomh Fionnbarra at Castlebellingham.

The new Millennium would find the Irelanders in Division 3, having first being relegated to the Intermediate grade, followed by a further relegation to junior football at the end of 2000. Some lean years would be in store for the club, as prospects were hindered by the retirements of senior players. Nevertheless, Young Irelands continued to plan for the future, with underage development receiving priority.

These efforts were rewarded in 2006 when a side containing several minors clinched the MacArdle Cup as Division 3 League winners. The club then went one better in 2007 by winning the Junior Championship for a fourth time in their history by beating St Mochta's 1–07 to 0–07. A championship double was almost achieved when the minors won through to the final of the Louth Minor Football Championship, only to lose to Geraldines by 1–12 to 1–07. The Junior success of 2007 was built upon with another Division 3 League title in 2009.

A 2–11 to 1–11 defeat of O'Raghallaighs in the 2010 Intermediate Championship final at Ardee brought the Green-and-Blacks back to Senior football for the first time since the late 1990s. They would return to intermediate football after being relegated two years later. A further relegation in 2017 saw the club fall to the junior grade after winning just one out of seventeen matches.

The 2018 season would prove to be another momentous year in Young Irelands' history as they won three major trophies. The Christy Bellew Cup for the Junior Championship was won with victory over Glyde Rangers, followed by the Division 3 Junior League and finally the Leinster Junior Club Football Championship. This was the first time a Louth club had won this provincial competition. The Irelanders beat the junior champions of Westmeath, Laois and Kilkenny on their way to winning the Leinster title with a 2–10 to 2–07 win over St Brigid's of Offaly at the Gaelic Grounds in December. They then met Kerry's Beaufort in the semi-finals of the All-Ireland Junior Club Football Championship on 20 January 2019 at O'Moore Park, Portlaoise. Despite leading by three points at half-time, the Irelanders went down 0–12 to 0–10 to the competition's eventual winners. The club currently competes in the Louth Intermediate championship and in Division 2 of the county's football leagues, which they won in 2021. Eamonn Morgan will manage the men's senior team in the 2025 season. In August 2025, the club launched a Strategic Development Plan (2025–2030) to set out plans to improve and expand the club.

== Catchment area ==
Founded in 1884, Dundalk Young Irelands originally drew players from all parts of the town. A later move to the Marist field in Seatown led to a strong local player base from that area. Now based at the Upper Marshes, the club is seeing growing participation from southern areas of Dundalk.

== Rivalries ==
Town neighbours Clan na Gael, Seán O'Mahony's and Dundalk Gaels have provided local opposition at the intermediate grade in recent years.

== Inter-county players ==
Current and former players, who have represented Louth at senior inter-county level, include:

- Tommy Carroll - selected in the full-back line against Carlow and Kildare during Louth's successful 1957 Leinster Championship campaign. Grandson of Michael Carroll, captain of Louth in the inaugural All-Ireland Senior Football final. Selector in 1979 when the club last won the Louth Senior Football Championship.
- Jim Cunningham - Elder brother of Seán. Played with Louth for several years and was selected for Leinster Railway cup side.
- Seán Cunningham – played in 1957 All-Ireland final victory at right-corner forward. Scored 1–01. Emigrated to USA afterwards.
- Frank Fagan – captain of club's SFC winning team in 1950. selected at left corner-forward on Louth Millennium team. Briefly managed Louth in 1984–85.
- Michael Flood - lined out at full-forward against Carlow and Wexford for Louth in 1957 Leinster Championship. Was an unused substitute on All-Ireland final day.
- Seán Óg Flood – Louth goalkeeper in 1957 All-Ireland final victory. Former club Chairman.
- Séamus Haughey – Full back. Captain of 1979 team that won Louth Senior Football Championship for first time in 29 years. Winner of Leinster Under-21 Football Championship medal with Louth in 1978.
- Paddy Larkin - winner of five Senior Championship medals with Young Irelands between 1938-47. Won two Railway Cups as Leinster goalkeeper 1944-45.
- Michael McCabe – Winner of Leinster Under-21 Football Championship medal with Louth in 1978. Centre-half back on club's 1979 SFC team. Captained Louth in 1980 O'Byrne Cup final victory over Dublin.
- Pat McConnon – Captain of Louth side that won Leinster Under-21 Football Championship in 1981. Regular in Louth's midfield throughout 1980s.
- Derek Maguire – winner of one Intermediate and two Junior championships with the club. Regular with Louth county football team from 2009 to 2018. Won 2009 O'Byrne Cup, 2011 NFL Division 3 and 2016 NFL Division 4 with Louth.
- Joe Mulligan – Half-back. won two Senior All-Irelands with Louth in 1910 and 1912. Finished on the losing side in 1909 final. Captained Young Irelands to two Championship titles in 1911 and 1915.
- Nicky Mulligan - son of Joe. Captained Young Irelands to back-to-back Senior Championship titles in 1940/41. Member of Louth squad that won the 1934 All-Ireland Junior Football Championship.
- Jim Quigley – 'Sogger', manager of Louth team that won 1957 All-Ireland Senior Football Championship. As a player, captained Young Irelands to two SFC victories in 1944 and 1947. Won two Leinster Senior Football Championship titles with Louth in 1943 and 1948. Selected at centre-half forward on Louth Millennium team. Won Railway Cup medal in 1944.
- Fergal Sheekey – Louth goalkeeper for 2019 and 2020 seasons. Won treble of County Junior Championship, League and Leinster Club Championship in 2018.
- Jim Tuft – selected at left corner-back on Louth Millennium team. Played in Louth's 1950 All-Ireland final defeat to Mayo.
- Larry Waller - won five Senior Championship medals with the club after transferring from Dowdallshill. Right-full back with Louth in 1943 Leinster final victory over Laois.
- Stephen White – played left half-back in 1957 All-Ireland Senior Football Championship Final win over Cork. Selected on Louth Millennium team and GAA Team of the Century in 1984. Played at left-half forward in 1950 All-Ireland final.

== Honours ==
- Louth Senior Football Championship (11): 1887, 1888, 1905, 1911, 1938, 1940, 1941, 1944, 1947, 1950, 1979
- Louth Senior Football League (6): 1938, 1939, 1940, 1941, 1948, 1978
- Louth Intermediate Football Championship (2): 1996, 2010
- Leinster Junior Club Football Championship (1): 2018
- Louth Junior Football Championship (5): 1937, 1950, 1977, 2007, 2018
- Old Gaels Cup/ACC Cup (2): 1957, 1985
- Louth Intermediate Football League (1): 2021
- Louth Junior A Football League (4): 1949, 2006, 2009, 2018
- Dealgan Milk Products Shield (1): 1995
- Louth Junior 2A Football Championship (1): 1982
- Louth Under-21 Football Championship (2): 1975, 1980
- Louth Minor B Football Championship (1): 2005
- Louth Junior 2 Football League Division 4B (1): 1993
- Louth Junior 2 Football League Division 4D (2): 2011, 2014,
- Louth Junior 2 Football League Division 6 (1): 2025
