= Clan Na Gael GFC (Louth) =

Louth-based Gaelic games club

Clan na Gael
- Founded: 1916
- County: Louth
- Nickname: The Clans
- Colours: Green with Yellow stripes
- Grounds: Clan na Gael Park
- Coordinates: 54.011°N 6.413°W

Playing kits
Standard colours

Clan na Gael GFC is a GAA club from Dundalk, County Louth, which fields Gaelic football teams in competitions organised by Louth GAA. Their motto is 'Once a Clan, Always a Clan'.

== History ==
Affiliating in 1916, the club won the Louth Minor Football Championship in 1920. The first adult title followed in 1922 with victory in the Louth Junior Football Championship. 1923 saw the club win the Louth Senior Football Championship by defeating Boyne Rangers of Drogheda, captained by inter-county player Peter Garland. In 1924 the Clans retained the championship by beating Larks of Killineer in the final on a scoreline of 1–06 to 0–01 at the Dundalk Athletic Grounds.

In 1933 the club lost the Louth Senior Football Championship final for the first time, going down 3–03 to 1–07 against Newtown Blues at the Drogheda Gaelic Grounds, with a team that featured five Hearty brothers. It would be a further 26 years before Clans would reach their next senior championship final. In 1959 they came from behind to draw with St Mary's, going on to win the replay at the Gaelic Grounds by 0–08 to 0–05. The side was captained by Benny Toal.

In 1954 Louth reached the final of the Leinster Junior Football Championship. The team, which lost to Dublin by seven points, included five Clans' players. They were Eddie Murphy (goal), John McArdle, Paddy Dixon, Benny Toal, and Séamus Connolly.

The early 1960s saw the emergence of Newtown Blues as the dominant force in Louth football. The Drogheda men would win seven Louth SFC titles during the decade. Their replay victory in 1964 at Ardee came at the Clans' expense, on a scoreline of 3–08 to 0–04.

The club's new home ground Clan na Gael Park was officially opened in 1966, coinciding with 50th anniversary celebrations.

The club's minor team won the Minor Championship in 1976, beating Oliver Plunketts 1–02 to 0–04 at St Brigid's Park, Dowdallshill. This side contained Jim Brady, Aidan Wiseman, Gary O'Callaghan and the McKeever brothers who all went on to win SFC titles in the 1980s.

The drought at Louth Senior Football Championship level finally ended in 1985 with a 1–06 to 0–04 win over Roche Emmets in the final at Dowdallshill. A bid for two in-a-row ended at the semi-final stage with defeat to Kilkerley Emmets in 1986. The Clans returned, however, the next year and defeated Newtown Blues in the final at Ardee, 1–07 to 0–04. The Louth county team now included several Clans players, including the O'Hanlon brothers, Niall O'Donnell, Peter Fitzpatrick and Gerry Curran. More success at minor level followed in the Eighties, with the Fr. Larry Murray Cup returning to the Ecco Road in 1981, 1983 and 1988.

The next few years saw Clan na Gael lose three county finals in a row, all narrowly, to opponents Newtown Blues (1988), Cooley Kickhams (1990) and Stabannon Parnells in 1991. Only a late equalizing point from the boot of Séamus O'Hanlon prevented a fourth straight county final defeat, against town rivals Dundalk Gaels in 1992. Clans won the replay at Dowdallshill on a scoreline of 3–11 to 1–06. The arrival of Stefan White from Castleblayney Faughs in 1991 further strengthened the team. The club went on to win all three Senior football competitions in both 1992 and 1993. The 1993 SFC final versus St Mary's at the Gaelic Grounds was won by four points, 1–12 to 1–08. This side was managed by Peter Fitzpatrick who also played centre-half back.

Clan na Gael won their eighth county SFC title in 1998 with a 0–08 to 0–04 win over Lann Léire in Castlebellingham. This was followed by further silverware in each of the next two seasons - the ACC Cup in 1999 and the Cardinal O'Donnell Cup in 2000 - defeating Cooley Kickhams in both finals. There was also success at underage level in this period, as the club won consecutive county Minor championships in 1999 and 2000.

A 1–10 to 1–07 defeat to Mattock Rangers at the semi-final stage ended the Clans' hopes of winning another Joe Ward cup in 2002. The club reached their last Senior championship semi-final to date in 2004, losing to eventual winners St Patrick's on a scoreline of 0–08 to 0–06. Relegation to the intermediate grade of Louth football was confirmed at the end of the 2006 season.

Clans' efforts to return to senior football since being relegated have been hindered by four successive defeats in the final of the Louth Intermediate Football Championship - in 2011 to O'Raghallaighs, to O'Connell's in 2012, in 2015 to Kilkerley Emmets (via replay) and O'Connell's again in 2017. As of 2023, the Ecco Road men are still competing at intermediate championship level and in Division 2 of the county football leagues. The club's manager for the 2023 season is Alan O'Neill.

== Catchment area ==
The club was founded by residents of the Castletown district of Dundalk and draws its players from the housing estates in the vicinity of the Castletown Road and the Redeemer parish. The clubhouse and pitches are located on Ecco Road just off Castletown Road and adjacent to the Dublin-Belfast railway line. In 2004, the County Board honoured the club by choosing Clan na Gael park as the venue for that year's Louth Senior Football Championship final, for the first time since their foundation in 1916. Three further SFC finals have since been staged at the Ecco Road grounds, in 2006, 2009 and 2022.

== Rivalries ==
The club's main local rivals are cross-town neighbours Dundalk Gaels - whom they beat in the 1992 Louth SFC final replay - and Seán O'Mahony's. At various times in their history, the Clans have had rivalries with clubs such as Newtown Blues, Cooley Kickhams and Stabannon Parnells.

== Inter-county players ==
Current and former club members, who have played with Louth inter-county football teams, include:

- John McArdle - centre half-back and captain of Louth team beaten in 1960 Leinster Senior Football Championship final by Offaly.
- Leslie Toal - full-back on Louth senior team from 1962 until retirement in 1978. Won All-Ireland Junior Football Championship medal as substitute on 1961 Louth team aged 17 and All-Ireland Junior Hurling Championship medals in 1976 & 1977. Managed Clans to two SFC titles in 1985 and 1987.
- Benny Gaughran - Made senior inter-county debut while still a teenager in 1964. Played his last game for Louth in 1983 Leinster Senior Football Championship. Member of Clans team beaten by Newtown Blues in replayed county final of 1964.
- Aidan Wiseman - Played with Louth between 1978 and 1986. Won Louth SFC medal in 1985 at right-half forward. Selected by Irish Independent on team of 15 best players between 1975 and 1999 never to win a Leinster Senior Football Championship medal.
- Peter Fitzpatrick - Centre-half back, captain of winning side in both 1987 and 1992 SFC finals. Player-Manager of winning side in 1993. Captained Louth county football team in 1988 and 1994. Later chairman of county board. Also a T.D. for Louth, being returned in the general elections of 2011, 2016 and 2020.
- Stephen Fitzpatrick - Son of Peter, played in the 2010 Leinster Senior Football Championship final.
- The O'Hanlon Brothers - Kevin, eldest of the trio, captained Louth from full-back in 1990 and also skippered the 1993 Clans side that won the county title for the second year in a row. Won All-Ireland underage boxing medals as a youth. Middle brother Séamus was a nominee for the Louth football team of the Millennium at midfield. Captained Louth in 1996–97. Winner of five Louth Senior Football Championship medals and a regular on Leinster Railway Cup sides. Younger brother, Cathal, was man-of-the-match at corner-forward in the 1987 county final win over Newtown Blues aged 16 and again in the 1998 final against Lannléire. Like Séamus, Cathal represented Louth in the Leinster Senior Football Championship in three different decades. As of 2023, he was the manager of Dundalk Gaels.
- Gerry Curran - Played in all five of Clans' SFC finals wins between 1985 and 1998 in a variety of different positions. Captained the team from midfield to a 0–08 to 0–04 victory over Lannléire in 1998. Made 17 appearances for Louth in Leinster Senior Football Championship.
- Niall O'Donnell - Goalkeeper, winner of four Louth SFC medals. Made Louth debut in Leinster Senior Football Championship at age 17, retired eleven years later after 1999 season.
- Conall McKeever - son of former Clans player Gerry. Debuted for Louth senior team in 2015. Can operate in both half-back and half-forward lines. Holder of NFL Division 3 and Division 4 winners' medals.
- Steve Staunton - better known as a Republic of Ireland international soccer player, he represented Louth from Under-14 to minor level. He scored a goal in Clan's 1985 SFC final win over Roche Emmets as a 16-year old. He played his last match for the club in 1986 before signing for Liverpool F.C. His brothers, David, Thomas and Pádraig, have all won SFC titles with the Clans.

== Honours ==
- Louth Senior Football Championship (8): 1923, 1924, 1959, 1985, 1987, 1992, 1993, 1998
- Senior Football League (10): 1929, 1982, 1987, 1990, 1992, 1993, 1994, 1996, 1997, 2000
- Louth Intermediate Football Championship (1): 1945
- Louth Junior Football Championship (4): 1922, 1930, 1936, 1954
- Louth Junior A Football League (4): 1929, 1947, 1953, 1954
- Louth Minor Football Championship (9): 1920, 1927, 1952, 1976, 1981, 1983, 1988, 1999, 2000
- Louth Senior Football League Division 1B (1): 2002
- ACC Cup (6): 1979, 1982, 1991, 1992, 1993, 1999
- Louth Junior 2A Football Championship (9): 1920, 1923, 1927, 1984, 1990, 1993, 1994, 1995, 2005
- Louth Junior 2A Football League (6): 1991, 1992, 1994, 1999, 2003, 2014
- Louth Junior 2 Football League (Division 4C) (1): 1998
- Louth Junior 2 Football League (Division 4D) (2): 2001, 2013
