= Ulster Minor Football Championship =

Gaelic football competition

- Founded: 1930
- Trophy: Fr. Murray Cup
- Title holders: Tyrone (27th title)
- Most titles: Tyrone (27 titles)
- Sponsors: ESB

The Ulster Minor Football Championship is the Minor "knockout" competition in the game of Gaelic football played in the province of Ulster in Ireland. The series of games are organised by the Ulster Council. The trophy for the winning side is The Larry Murray Cup. The competition began in 1930, with Armagh winning during the inaugural year. The most successful county to date is Tyrone who have won on 27 occasions. The winner and the beaten finalist represent Ulster in the All-Ireland Minor Football Championship.

== List of winners by county ==
	Team	Wins	Years won	Runners up	Years runners up
1	Tyrone	27	1931, 1934, 1946, 1947, 1948, 1967, 1971, 1972, 1973, 1975, 1976, 1978, 1988, 1993, 1997, 1998, 2001, 2003, 2004, 2007, 2008, 2010, 2012, 2021, 2022, 2025, 2026	10	1932, 1936, 1953, 1969, 1979, 1991, 2000, 2002, 2013, 2019
2	Derry	17	1965, 1969, 1970, 1980, 1981, 1983, 1984, 1989, 1990, 1995, 2000, 2002, 2015, 2017, 2020, 2023, 2024	10	1966, 1968, 1974, 1993, 1996, 2007, 2016, 2018, 2022, 2026
3	Armagh	12	1930, 1949, 1951, 1953, 1954, 1957, 1961, 1968, 1992, 1994, 2005, 2009	17	1931, 1933, 1937, 1947, 1950, 1956, 1962, 1977, 1980, 1981, 1984, 1987, 1989, 2010, 2011, 2014, 2024
4	Down	10	1958, 1960, 1962, 1963, 1966, 1977, 1979, 1986, 1987, 1999	10	1934, 1945, 1952, 1982, 1990, 1994, 1995, 2004, 2005, 2009
5	Antrim	8	1932, 1933, 1936, 1941, 1950, 1955, 1964, 1982	6	1938, 1940, 1959, 1997, 1998, 2006
6	Donegal	7	1956, 1985, 1991, 1996, 2006, 2014, 2016	5	1949, 1957, 1963, 1992, 1999
7	Monaghan	6	1939, 1940, 1945, 2013, 2018, 2019	11	1930, 1946, 1948, 1960, 1961, 1978, 1983, 2001, 2008, 2012, 2023
8	Cavan	6	1937, 1938, 1952, 1959, 1974, 2011	15	1939, 1941, 1951, 1955, 1958, 1964, 1965, 1972, 1975, 1976, 1985, 1988, 2015, 2017, 2025
9	Fermanagh	0	—N/a	4	1967, 1970, 1971, 2003

== Finals listed by year ==
All-Ireland champions
All-Ireland runners-up

Under 17 Competition
Year	Winner	Score	Opponent	Score
2026	Tyrone	2-16	Derry	1-12
2025	Tyrone	2-11	Cavan	1-08
2024	Derry	0-12	Armagh	1-07
2023	Derry	1-15 (AET); Derry win 4-2 on penalties	Monaghan	3-09
2022	Tyrone	4-08	Derry	0-16
2021	Tyrone	2-11	Donegal	1-7
2020	Derry	1-15	Monaghan	0-15
2019	Monaghan	1-13	Tyrone	1-11
2018	Monaghan	1–09	Derry	0-09
Under 18 Competition
Year	Winner	Score	Opponent	Score
2017	Derry	1–22	Cavan	2–12
2016	Donegal	2–10	Derry	1–11
2015	Derry	1–11	Cavan	0–11
2014	Donegal	2–12	Armagh	0–10
2013	Monaghan	4–10	Tyrone	2–14
2012	Tyrone	0–14	Monaghan	1–08
2011	Cavan	0–12	Armagh	1–06
2010	Tyrone	1–14	Armagh	0–05
2009	Armagh	1–08	Down	1–05
2008	Tyrone	0–13	Monaghan	0–10
2007	Tyrone	0–10	Derry	1–06
2006	Donegal	2–12	Antrim	1–05
2005	Armagh	0–11	Down	0–10
2004	Tyrone	0–11, 0–15 (R)	Down	0–11, 0–08 (R)
2003	Tyrone	3–09	Fermanagh	0–09
2002	Derry	0–12	Tyrone	0–11
2001	Tyrone	2–13	Monaghan	0–13
2000	Derry	2–11	Tyrone	1–11
1999	Down	0–10, 2–07 (R)	Donegal	0–10, 0–09 (R)
1998	Tyrone	4–09	Antrim	2–02
1997	Tyrone	3–13	Antrim	2–10
1996	Donegal	0–09, 0–09 (R)	Derry	0–09, 1–05 (R)
1995	Derry	2–12	Down	1–07
1994	Armagh	3–13	Down	1–07
1993	Tyrone	1–09	Derry	1–05
1992	Armagh	0–13	Donegal	0–09
1991	Donegal	1–10	Tyrone	1–09
1990	Derry	2–10	Down	2–08
1989	Derry	2–15	Armagh	2–03
1988	Tyrone	2–07	Cavan	0–03
1987	Down	1–07	Armagh	0–04
1986	Down	1–12	Derry	0–10
1985	Donegal	2–11	Cavan	1–03
1984	Derry	1–04	Armagh	0–03
1983	Derry	3–09	Monaghan	0–04
1982	Antrim	2–10	Down	3–05
1981	Derry	0–11	Armagh	1–02
1980	Derry	3–14	Armagh	1–02
1979	Down	1–07	Tyrone	0–06
1978	Tyrone	3–11	Monaghan	2–09
1977	Down	0–08, 0–11 (R)	Armagh	1–05, 1–06 (R)
1976	Tyrone	5–07	Cavan	1–09
1975	Tyrone	0–10	Cavan	0–07
1974	Cavan	3–09	Derry	1–04
1973	Tyrone	1–13	Down	0–09
1972	Tyrone	3–06	Cavan	1–06
1971	Tyrone	0–19	Fermanagh	0–07
1970	Derry	1–14	Fermanagh	0–11
1969	Derry	1–09	Tyrone	0–05
1968	Armagh	4–08	Derry	1–07
1967	Tyrone	0–16	Fermanagh	2–05
1966	Down	1–12	Derry	1–09
1965	Derry	3–11	Cavan	2–04
1964	Antrim	2–10	Cavan	0–06
1963	Down	4–06	Donegal	2–11
1962	Down	2–05	Armagh	0–08
1961	Armagh	3–08	Monaghan	1–04
1960	Down	2–07	Monaghan	1–04
1959	Cavan	2–11	Antrim	2–07
1958	Down	3–09	Cavan	3–01
1957	Armagh	3–06	Donegal	0–10
1956	Donegal	2–05	Armagh	0–06
1955	Antrim	4–03	Cavan	2–06
1954	Armagh	2–08	Down	0–09
1953	Armagh	2–15	Tyrone	3–02
1952	Cavan	1–05	Down	1–03
1951	Armagh	3–01	Cavan	1–04
1950	Antrim	1–08, 1–09 (R)	Armagh	1–08, 1–01 (R)
1949	Armagh	4–06	Donegal	1–04
1948	Tyrone	5–07	Monaghan	2–03
1947	Tyrone	3–06	Armagh	2–08
1946	Tyrone	1–04	Monaghan	0–05
1945	Monaghan	1–07	Down	0–07
1944	Suspended			
1943	Suspended			
1942	Suspended			
1941	Antrim	2–05	Cavan	1–07
1940	Monaghan	0–08	Antrim	0–04
1939	Monaghan	0–05, 1–08 (R)	Cavan	0–05, 1–07 (R)
1938	Cavan	2–07	Antrim	2–04
1937	Cavan	1–10	Armagh	0–03
1936	Antrim	2–07	Tyrone	2–04
1935	No winner**			
1934	Tyrone	1–04	Down	1–03
1933	Antrim	2–07	Armagh	1–01
1932	Antrim	2–07	Tyrone	1–02
1931	Tyrone	0–07	Armagh	0–04
1930	Armagh	3–04	Monaghan	0–10

- 1935 Final Down 2–02 Donegal 2-01 Objection and counter objection. Competition declared null and void.

== See also ==
- Munster Minor Football Championship
- Leinster Minor Football Championship
- Connacht Minor Football Championship
