= St Mary's College, Dundalk =

Location
- Ireland; 54.009213°N 6.40033°W

Information
- Motto: Sub Mariae Nomine (In Mary's name)
- Established: 1861; 165 years ago
- Principal: Alan Craven
- Enrollment: 751
- Website: maristdundalk.com

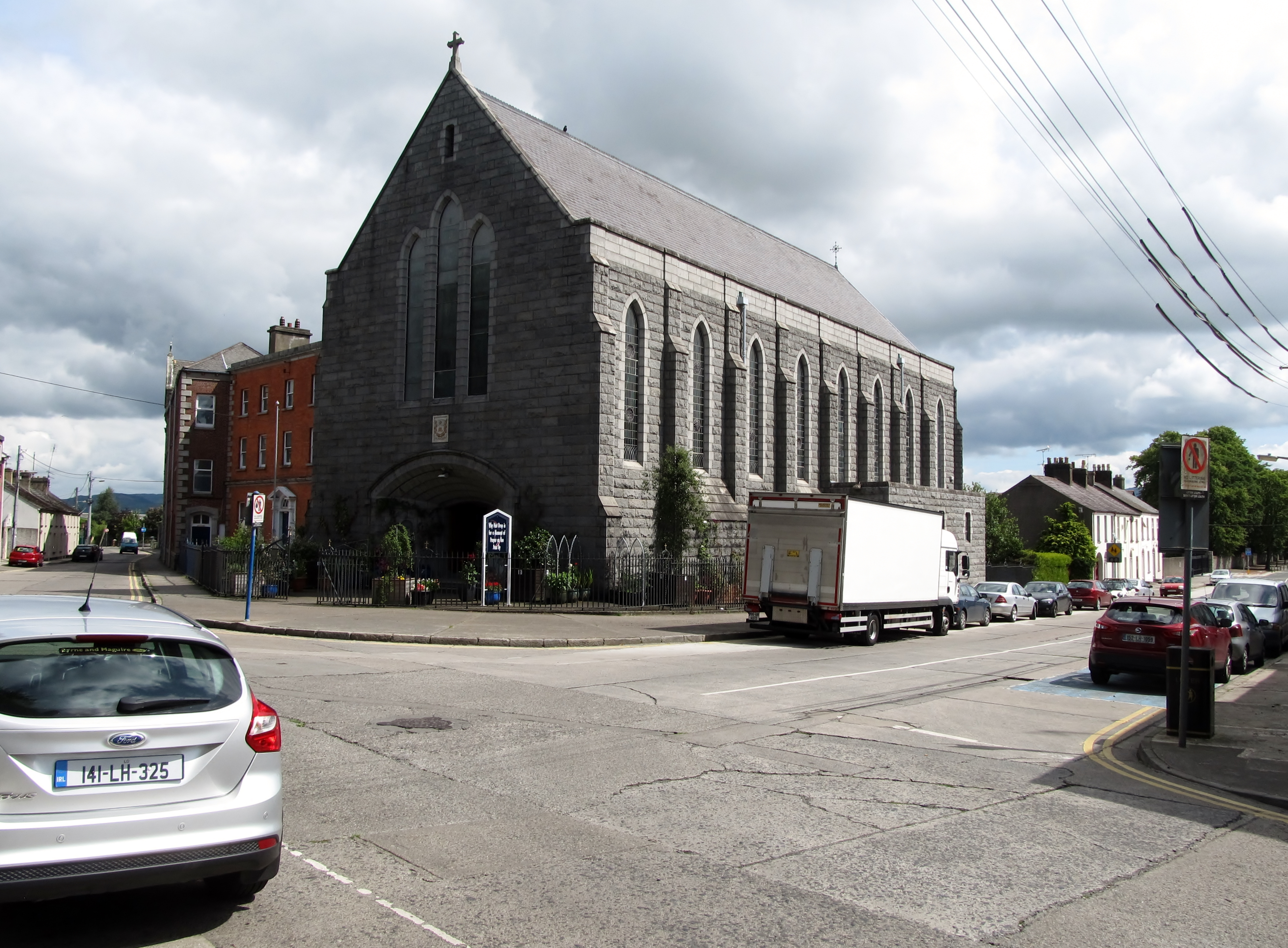
Chapel serving the college

St Mary's College, Dundalk is a secondary school in County Louth, Ireland. It consists of a mixed school which provides Junior Certificate and leaving certificate programmes.

== Notable alumni ==
- Israel Olatunde – Professional track and field athlete, record holder for fastest Irish man in history
- Eoin Kenny - Professional footballer for Portsmouth, Northern Ireland U21 international
- Emmanuel Adegboyega – Professional footballer for Rotherham United, Ireland U21 international
- Dermot Ahern – Politician and Government Minister
- Joseph Finnegan – Judge of the Supreme Court of Ireland and President of the Irish High Court
- Ryan O'Kane – Professional footballer for Sligo Rovers
- Neil Gallagher – Sportsman
- Larry Goodman – Businessman and billionaire
- Fred Halliday – Writer
- Denis Henry – first Lord Chief Justice of Northern Ireland, a Barrister (Queen's Counsel), Solicitor-General for Ireland, Attorney General for Ireland, and Bencher of the Honorable Society of King's Inns.
- Ben Kane - Sunday Times bestselling author
- David Kennedy – Marist Father
- Sir Thomas Callan Macardle – Businessman
- Brendan McGahon – Politician

== See also ==
- St Mary's College, Dublin
