= All-Britain Football Championship =

Men's Gaelic football inter-county competition

- Current season or competition: 2026 All-Britain Football Championship
- Code: Gaelic football
- Founded: 1927; 99 years ago
- Region: Britain (GAA)
- No. of teams: 7
- Title holders: London (42nd title)
- Most titles: London (42 titles)
- TV partner: 247.tv
- Official website: Gaelic Games Council of Britain website

The All-Britain Football Championship is the Gaelic football provincial championship competition in Great Britain. The British county teams compete against each other in a straight knockout format, with the winner declared "All-Britain" champions, and both the winner and the runner-up qualifying for the All-Ireland Junior Football Championship. Organised by the Provincial Council of Britain of the Gaelic Athletic Association (GAA), the championship has been contested since the official founding of Britain as a separate GAA province in 1926.

== History ==
The Provincial Council of Britain was established in 1926 by the Central Council of the Gaelic Athletic Association, following a number of years of direct affiliation by British county boards with the GAA. With London already playing in the Irish competitive football structure, the All-Britain was set up in order to facilitate competition between the British county teams. At the 1927 GAA Congress, county teams under the remit of the British Provincial Council were allowed to compete in the All-Ireland Junior Football Championship for the first time.

London and Warwickshire have been dominant throughout the tournament's existence, owing in part to their large Irish diasporic populations. However, between 2000 and 2020 there was a much larger variance in winning counties, with all 8 participants winning during that period and only Lancashire winning three or more titles in a row. In 2021, following years of decline in the All-Ireland JFC and the impact of the COVID-19 pandemic, the GAA Congress passed a motion completely changing the format of junior county football, resulting in Kilkenny no longer competing in the All-Britain. Since then, London and Warwickshire have resumed their dominance, playing in every final from 2022 to present.

== Teams ==
The seven counties of Britain compete in the Championship:

County	Location	Stadium	Year formed	Position in 2026 Championship	All-Britain titles
Gloucestershire	Cardiff	Pontcanna Fields	1959; 67 years ago	Group stage	1 (2008)
Hertfordshire	Watford	Radlett Road	1960; 66 years ago	Semi-final	3 (1965, 1972, 2000)
Lancashire	Manchester	Old Bedians	1926; 100 years ago	Group stage	13 (1949, 1953, 1958, 1963, 1993, 1994, 2002, 2004, 2010, 2011, 2012, 2013, 2016)
London	Ruislip	McGovern Park	1896; 130 years ago	Champions	42 (1928, 1929, 1930, 1931, 1932, 1933, 1934, 1935, 1937, 1938, 1939, 1947, 1948, 1950, 1952, 1954, 1956, 1959, 1960, 1962, 1964, 1967, 1968, 1969, 1970, 1971, 1973, 1974, 1975, 1982, 1986, 1988, 1991, 1992, 1995, 2005, 2007, 2009, 2022, 2024, 2025, 2026)
Scotland	Glasgow	Clydebank Sports Hub	1897; 129 years ago	Semi-final	2 (2014, 2019)
Warwickshire	Solihull	Páirc na hÉireann	1941; 85 years ago	Runner-up	20 (1946, 1951, 1955, 1957, 1976, 1978, 1979, 1980, 1984, 1985, 1987, 1989, 1990, 1997, 1998, 1999, 2003, 2006, 2021, 2023)
Yorkshire	Leeds	Páirc Beeston	1948; 78 years ago	Group stage	4 (1961, 1983, 1996, 2001)

The counties in Britain exist as junior-level teams and do not compete in the All-Ireland Senior Football Championship or Tailteann Cup (except London, who have a senior team). Unlike the ladies' football competitions, teams cannot be promoted from or relegated to the junior competition.

Kilkenny played in the All-Britain prior to the re-formatting of the All-Ireland Junior Football Championship in 2021:

County	Location	Stadium	Year formed	Position in 2026 Championship	All-Britain titles
Kilkenny	Kilkenny	Nowlan Park	1887; 139 years ago	N/A	3 (2015, 2017, 2018)

== Roll of honour ==
- 1928 London
- 1929 London
- 1930 London
- 1931 London
- 1932 London
- 1933 London
- 1934 London
- 1935 London
- 1936 unknown
- 1937 London
- 1938 London
- 1939 not played
- 1940 not played
- 1941 not played
- 1942 not played
- 1943 not played
- 1944 not played
- 1945 not played
- 1946 Warwickshire
- 1947 London
- 1948 London
- 1949 Lancashire
- 1950 London
- 1951 Warwickshire
- 1952 London
- 1953 Lancashire
- 1954 London
- 1955 Warwickshire
- 1956 London
- 1957 Warwickshire
- 1958 Lancashire
- 1959 London
- 1960 London
- 1961 Yorkshire
- 1962 London
- 1963 Lancashire
- 1964 London
- 1965 Hertfordshire
- 1966 London
- 1967 London
- 1968 London
- 1969 London
- 1970 London
- 1971 London
- 1972 Hertfordshire
- 1973 London
- 1974 London
- 1975 London
- 1976 Warwickshire
- 1977 unknown
- 1978 Warwickshire
- 1979 Warwickshire
- 1980 Warwickshire
- 1981 unknown
- 1982 London
- 1983 Yorkshire
- 1984 Warwickshire
- 1985 Warwickshire
- 1986 London
- 1987 Warwickshire
- 1988 London
- 1989 Warwickshire
- 1990 Warwickshire
- 1991 London
- 1992 London
- 1993 Lancashire
- 1994 Lancashire
- 1995 London
- 1996 Yorkshire
- 1997 Warwickshire
- 1998 Warwickshire
- 1999 Warwickshire
- 2000 Hertfordshire
- 2001 Yorkshire
- 2002 Lancashire
- 2003 Warwickshire
- 2004 Lancashire
- 2005 London
- 2006 Warwickshire
- 2007 London
- 2008 Gloucestershire
- 2009 London
- 2010 Lancashire
- 2011 Lancashire
- 2012 Lancashire
- 2013 Lancashire
- 2014 Scotland
- 2015 Kilkenny
- 2016 Lancashire
- 2017 Kilkenny
- 2018 Kilkenny
- 2019 Scotland
- 2020 not played
- 2021 Warwickshire
- 2022 London
- 2023 Warwickshire
- 2024 London
- 2025 London
- 2026 London

== List of finals ==
The winner (and since 2021, the runner-up) of the All-Britain qualifies for the All-Ireland Junior Football Championship:

Year	Winners	Score		Runners-up	Venue
2026	LON	1-13	1-11	WAR	McGovern Park, Ruislip
2025	LON	1-14	1-13	WAR	Páirc na nÉireann, Solihull
2024	LON	2-10	0-10	WAR	McGovern Park, Ruislip
2023	WAR	1-18	1-15	LON	Páirc na nÉireann, Solihull
2022	LON	3-14	3-8	WAR	McGovern Park, Ruislip
2021	WAR	2-13	0-8	LON	Páirc na hÉireann, Solihull
2021	WAR	1-10	0-13	LON	McGovern Park, Ruislip
2020	cancelled due to COVID-19 pandemic				
2019	SCO	3-12	3-11	WAR	Páirc na nÉireann, Solihull
2018	KLK	6-12	0-9	WAR	Páirc na nÉireann, Solihull
2017	KLK	3-15	1-6	WAR	Páirc na nÉireann, Solihull
2016	LAN	1-10	2-6	LON	Páirc na nÉireann, Solihull
2015	KLK	2-7	0-8	SCO	Granton Road, Edinburgh
2014	SCO	3-10	2-7	WAR	Páirc na nÉireann, Solihull
2013	LAN	2-12	1-11	HER	
2012	LAN	2-10	0-10	LON	
2011	LAN	1-11	0-4	WAR	
2010	LAN	0-16	1-6	LON	
2009	LON	2-6	0-10	LAN	
2008	GLO	1-12	0-6	WAR	
2007	LON	0-11	0-9	LAN	
