= 1961 All-Ireland Junior Football Championship =

All Ireland Champions
- Winners: Louth (4th win)
- Captain: Gussie Sheelan

All Ireland Runners-up
- Runners-up: Yorkshire
- Captain: Hugh Keegan

Provincial Champions
- Munster: Kerry
- Leinster: Louth
- Ulster: Monaghan
- Connacht: Galway

The 1961 All-Ireland Junior Football Championship was the 40th staging of the championship since its establishment by the GAA in 1912.

The competition format saw the four provincial champions compete in two 'Home' semi-finals, the winners of which then contested the All-Ireland 'Home' final at Croke Park.

Louth, having accounted for Meath, Longford and Offaly in the Leinster preliminary rounds and Dublin in the provincial final, went on to defeat Kerry and Galway in the All-Ireland Series to emerge as 'Home' champions.

In the last stage of the competition, the victorious 'Home' finalists then met the champions of Britain to determine who would be crowned overall All-Ireland Junior Football Champions for 1961.

The title match was played on 8 October in Leeds. The 1961 British champions Yorkshire provided the opposition for Louth. A tight game ended in victory for the Wee County side by three points.

== Results ==
=== Munster Junior Football Championship ===
2 July 1961 Final	Kerry	2–04 - 0–06	Cork	Sam Maguire Memorial Park, Dunmanway
				Referee: F. Neenan (Limerick)

=== Leinster Junior Football Championship ===
6 August 1961 Final	Louth	2–04 - 0–08	Dublin	Páirc Tailteann, Navan
				Referee: T. Million (Meath)

GK	1	Jim Clifford (St Patrick's)
RCB	2	Oliver Coombes (Wolfe Tones)
FB	3	Jim Butterly (Mattock Rangers)
LCB	4	Anthony Kirwan (Dreadnots)
RHB	5	Gussie Sheelan (St Patrick's) (c)
CHB	6	Michael Kelly (Wolfe Tones)
LHB	7	Noel McDonnell (Drogheda Parnells)
MF	8	Ted Russell (Naomh Mhuire)
MF	9	Paddy Jordan (St Patrick's)
RHF	10	Seán Goodman (Walshestown Rovers)
CHF	11	Jim Sheelan (St Patrick's)
LHF	12	Jim Judge (Newtown Blues)
RCF	13	Ronnie McDonnell (Seán McDermott's)
FF	14	Henry Donnelly (St Patrick's)
LCF	15	Fra Kirk (Clan na Gael)
Substitutes:
	16	Jimmy Kierans (O'Connells) for Judge
	17	Paddy Reilly (Naomh Mhuire) for Ronnie McDonnell

GK	1	Martin Leonard (St Maur's)
RCB	2	Paddy Archibold (St Joseph's)
FB	3	Leo Hickey (Ballyboughal)
LCB	4	Brian Cooney (Rialto Gaels)
RHB	5	Pat Fox (Rialto Gaels)
CHB	6	Liam O'Hagan (Synge Street) (c)
LHB	7	Denis Dempsey (Rialto Gaels)
MF	8	Colm Fox (Ballyboughal)
MF	9	Frank McKearney (St Joseph's)
RHF	10	Paddy Barrett (Ballyboughal)
CHF	11	Bert Ennis (Garristown)
LHF	12	Noel Kinsella (Fingal Ravens)
RCF	13	Nicky Dempsey (Rialto Gaels)
FF	14	Anthony Burke (Na Fianna)
LCF	15	Pat Somers (St Anne's)
Substitutes:
	16	Paddy Nally (Seán McDermotts) for Burke
	17	Eamonn Burgess (Good Counsel) for Kinsella
	18	Finbarr Sheehan (St Patrick's, Donabate) for C. Fox

=== Ulster Junior Football Championship ===
21 May 1961 Final	Monaghan	2–08 - 1–06	Antrim	Davitt Park, Lurgan
				Referee: P. Rooney (Down)

=== Connacht Junior Football Championship ===
4 June 1961 Final	Galway	2–12 - 0–09	Mayo	Duggan Park, Ballinasloe
				Referee: J. McPhillips (Roscommon)

=== All-Ireland Junior Football Championship ===
==== 'Home' Semi-Finals ====
27 August 1961	Louth	2–07 - 1–08	Kerry	Gaelic Grounds, Drogheda
				Referee: L. Maguire (Monaghan)

27 August 1961	Galway	5–09 - 1–01	Monaghan	Duggan Park, Ballinasloe
				Referee: J. Dowling (Offaly)

==== 'Home' Final ====
10 September 1961	Louth	0–11 - 1–07	Galway	Croke Park, Dublin
				Referee: P. Rooney (Down)

==== All-Ireland Final ====
8 October 1961	Louth	1–13 - 1–10	Yorkshire	Roundhay Park, Leeds
	F. Kirk 0-6, J. Sheelan 1-2, H. Donnelly, F. Fagan 0-2 each, J. Judge 0-1		M. Neary 1-4, P. O'Hara, J. Sheils 0-2 each, M. Jordan, G. Kelly 0-1 each	Referee: Brian Smyth (Meath)

GK	1	Jim Clifford (St Patrick's)
RCB	2	Oliver Coombes (Wolfe Tones)
FB	3	Jim Butterly (Mattock Rangers)
LCB	4	Anthony Kirwan (Dreadnots)
RHB	5	Gussie Sheelan (St Patrick's)
CHB	6	Michael Kelly (Wolfe Tones)
LHB	7	Paddy Dixon (Clan na Gael)
MF	8	Frank Fagan (Newtown Blues)
MF	9	Paddy Jordan (St Patrick's)
RHF	10	Jim Sheelan (St Patrick's)
CHF	11	Muckle McKeown (O'Raghallaighs)
LHF	12	Jim Judge (Newtown Blues)
RCF	13	Seán Goodman (Walshestown Rovers)
FF	14	Henry Donnelly (St Patrick's)
LCF	15	Fra Kirk (Clan na Gael)
Substitutes:
	16	Joe Mallon (Newtown Blues) for Jordan
	17	Leslie Toal (Clan na Gael) for Coombes
Manager:
Paddy McArdle

GK	1	Michael Courtney (Kerry)
RCB	2	Jim Grennan (Offaly)
FB	3	Leo Daly (Louth)
LCB	4	Tom Fox (Meath)
RHB	5	Pat Donnellan (Galway)
CHB	6	Pat Beirne (Roscommon)
LHB	7	Patrick O'Hara (Meath)
MF	8	Michael Jordan (Mayo)
MF	9	Jimmy Kelly (Laois)
RHF	10	Pat Marron (Monaghan)
CHF	11	Hugh Keegan (Westmeath)
LHF	12	Gene Kelly (Limerick)
RCF	13	Pat Burke (Tipperary)
FF	14	Michael Neary (Dublin)
LCF	15	Joe Sheils (Louth)
