= 2012 All-Ireland Junior Football Championship =

All Ireland Champions
- Winners: Kerry (15th win)
- Captain: Marcus Mangan
- Manager: Seán Monihan

All Ireland Runners-up
- Runners-up: Mayo
- Captain: Ronan McNamara
- Manager: John Kelly

Provincial Champions
- Munster: Kerry
- Leinster: Cavan
- Ulster: Not Played
- Connacht: Mayo

The 2012 All-Ireland Junior Football Championship was the 82nd staging of the All-Ireland Junior Championship since its establishment by the Gaelic Athletic Association in 1912.

Cork entered the championship as the defending champions, however, they were beaten by Kerry in the Munster semi-final.

The All-Ireland final was played on 25 August 2012 at Cusack Park in Ennis, between Kerry and Mayo, in what was their second ever meeting in the final and a first meeting in 15 years. Kerry won the match by 0–19 to 1–07 to claim their 15th championship title overall and a first titles in six years.
