= 2026 All-Ireland Junior Football Championship =

Lower-tier tournament between Gaelic counties

- Dates: 25 April - 12 July 2026
- Teams: 5 (10 including All-Britain)
- Champions: London (7th title); Noel Maher (captain)
- Runners-up: United States

The 2026 All-Ireland Junior Football Championship is the 94th staging of the All-Ireland Junior Football Championship since its establishment by the Gaelic Athletic Association in 1912.

== Format ==
Since 2022, the competition has involved Junior Gaelic football inter-county teams; Kilkenny (who do not compete in the All-Ireland Senior Football Championship), New York, and the winners and runners up from the All-Britain Junior Football Championship, played between the county teams of Britain. A second American team representing all other parts of the country outside New York, known as United States GAA, has entered the competition since 2024.

== Teams ==
County	Province	County ground	Last provincial title	Last All-Ireland title
Gloucestershire	Britain	Pontcanna Fields	2008	-
Hertfordshire	Britain	Radlett Road	2000	-
Kilkenny	Leinster	Nowlan Park	2018	2022
Lancashire	Britain	Old Bedians	2016	-
London	Britain	McGovern Park	2025	1986
New York	no official province	Gaelic Park	-	2025
Scotland	Britain	Clydebank Sports Hub	2019	-
United States	no official province	no county ground	-	-
Warwickshire	Britain	Páirc na hÉireann	2023	-
Yorkshire	Britain	Páirc Beeston	2001	-

== All-Britain Junior Football Championship ==
=== Group A ===
Pos	Team	Pld	W	D	L	SF	SA	Diff	Pts	Qualification
1	Warwickshire	3	3	0	0	4-48	0-22	+38	6	Advance to semi-finals
2	Hertfordshire	3	2	0	1	3-30	4-41	-14	4	Advance to semi-finals
3	London	3	1	0	2	2-29	2-27	+2	2	Advance to semi-finals
4	Lancashire	3	0	0	3	2-26	5-43	-26	0	

25 April 2026 Round 1A	Lancashire	1-7 - 2-12	London	Hough End, Lancashire

25 April 2026 Round 1A	Hertfordshire	0-7 - 3-20	Warwickshire	Radlett Road, Hertfordshire

2 May 2026 Round 2A	London	0-8 - 0-9	Warwickshire	Radlett Road, Hertfordshire

2 May 2026 Round 2A	Hertfordshire	2-12 - 1-12	Lancashire	Páirc na hÉireann, Warwickshire

9 May 2026 Round 3A	Hertfordshire	1-11 - 0-9	London	McGovern Park, London

9 May 2026 Round 3A	Warwickshire	1-19 - 0-7	Lancashire	Páirc na hÉireann, Warwickshire

=== Group B ===
Pos	Team	Pld	W	D	L	SF	SA	Diff	Pts	Qualification
2	Scotland	1	1	0	0	2-12	2-10	+2	4	Advance to semi-finals
4	Gloucestershire	1	0	0	1	2-10	2-12	-2	2	
3	Yorkshire	0	0	0	0	0-00	0-00	0	0	

25 April 2026 Round 1B	Gloucestershire	v	Yorkshire	Páirc na hÉireann, Warwickshire
Note: Match not played, Gloucestershire given win.

2 May 2026 Round 2B	Scotland	2-12 - 2-10	Gloucestershire	Hough End, Lancashire

9 May 2026 Round 3B	Scotland	v	Yorkshire	Clydebank Sports Hub, Scotland
Note: Match not played, Scotland given win.

=== Semi-finals ===
31 May 2026 2026 All-Britain JFC semi-final 1	Scotland	3-6 - 0-16	Warwickshire	Old Bedians, Lancashire
				Referee: Barry McGeehan

31 May 2026 2026 All-Britain JFC semi-final 2	London	1-17 - 0-6	Hertfordshire	McGovern Park, London
				Referee: Michael Tiffoney

=== Final ===
14 June 2026 2026 All-Britain JFC final	London	1-13 - 1-11	Warwickshire	McGovern Park, London
	Caolan Doyle 0-05 (1 45); Alfie McNulty 1-01; Conor Redican 0-03; Shaun McCready 0-03; Matthew Joyce 0-01		Alfie Harrigan 0-04 (2fs tp); Aidan Mee 1-00; Jack Keogh 0-02 (tp); Niall Gilbride 0-02 (tp); Jack Chapman 0-02; Eamonn Brannigan 0-01	Referee: Ivan Lehane

== All-Ireland Junior Football Championship ==
=== Quarter-final ===
27 June 2026 2026 All-Ireland JFC quarter-final	Warwickshire	1-15 - 1-10	Kilkenny	Páirc na hÉireann, Warwickshire
		Report		Referee: Conor Dourneen

=== Semi-finals ===
10 July 2026 2026 All-Ireland JFC semi-final 1	United States	2-13 - 1-11	Warwickshire	Abbotstown, Dublin
	Eoin Gormley 1-05 (1 tp); Eoin Morrissey 0-05 (1 tp); Michael Kerr 1-00; Declan Kelly 0-02 (1f); Dylan Murtagh 0-1 (1f)	Report	Michael McGettrick 1-03; Niall Gilbride 0-02; Jack Keogh 0-02 (1f); Alfie Harrigan 0-01 (1f); Aidan Mee 0-01; Eamonn Brannigan 0-01; Paddy Heffernan 0-01	Referee: Ian Monaghan
Note: Extra time needed, score 1-9 - 1-9 after normal time

10 July 2026 2026 All-Ireland JFC semi-final 2	London	0-15 - 0-13	New York	Abbotstown, Dublin
	Noel Maher 0-05 (2 45s, 1 tp); Conor Redican 0-03 (1f); Caolán Doyle 0-02 (2f); Luke Morahan 0-02; Ali Carney 0-01; Seán Hickey 0-01; Shaun McCready 0-01	Report	Shay McElligott 0-07 (4f, 1 tp); Brian Coughlan 0-03 (1 tpf); Jack Gleeson 0-01; Senan Price 0-01; Aaron Traynor 0-01	Referee: Ian Howley

=== Final ===
12 July 2026 2026 All-Ireland JFC final	London	5-12 – 0-17	United States	Croke Park, Dublin
	Shaun McCready 2-02; Conor Redican 1-02 (1f); Alfie McNulty 1-01; Noel Maher 0-04 (2 tpf); Niall McGivney 1-00; Seán Gaynor 0-01; Terry Gallagher 0-01; Caolan Doyle 0-01 (1f)	Report	Eoin Gormley 0-05 (1f); Michael Moylan 0-04 (3f); Ronan Orford 0-03; Dylan Murtagh 0-02 (1f); Michael Kerr 0-02 (2f); Declan Kelly 0-01	Referee: Kieran Eannetta

== See also ==
- 2026 All-Ireland Senior Football Championship
- 2026 Tailteann Cup
- 2026 Connacht Senior Football Championship
- 2026 Leinster Senior Football Championship
- 2026 Munster Senior Football Championship
- 2026 Ulster Senior Football Championship
