= 1946 All-Ireland Junior Football Championship =

All Ireland Champions
- Winners: Down (1st win)
- Captain: Gerry Carr

All Ireland Runners-up
- Runners-up: Warwickshire

Provincial Champions
- Munster: Kerry
- Leinster: Louth
- Ulster: Down
- Connacht: Leitrim

The 1946 All-Ireland Junior Football Championship was the 25th staging of the championship since its establishment by the GAA in 1912.

The competition format saw the four provincial champions compete in two 'Home' semi-finals, the winners of which then contested the All-Ireland 'Home' final.

In the last stage of the competition, the victorious 'Home' finalists then met the champions of Britain to determine who would be crowned overall All-Ireland Junior Football Champions for 1946.

The title match at Croke Park concluded with Down defeating Warwickshire, the champions of Britain, on a scoreline of 2–10 to 1–09.

== Results ==
=== Munster Junior Football Championship ===
Final	Kerry	3–03 - 1–07	Cork

=== Ulster Junior Football Championship ===
Final	Down	2–05 - 0–07	Donegal

=== Connacht Junior Football Championship ===
Final	Leitrim	2–09 - 0–04	Galway

=== Leinster Junior Football Championship ===
23 June 1946 Final	Louth	3-05 – 0-01	Wexford	Croke Park, Dublin

GK	1	Tom McQuaid (Seán O'Mahony's)
RCB	2	Mick Rafferty (St Fechin's)
FB	3	Joe Callan (St Colmcille's, Togher)
LCB	4	Jim McGee (Clan na Gael)
RHB	5	Tommy Hughes (Seán O'Mahony's)
CHB	6	Tommy Fitzgerald (Seán O'Mahony's)
LHB	7	Roger Lynch (Geraldines)
MF	8	Dermot Kelly (Owen Roe's)
MF	9	Frank Smith (Drogheda Parnells)
RHF	10	Paddy McCourt (Seán O'Mahony's)
CHF	11	Peter Donnelly (Owen Roe's) (c)
LHF	12	Mickey Lennon (Geraldines)
RCF	13	Joe MacArtain (Dundalk Young Irelands)
FF	14	David McCreanor (Hunterstown Rovers)
LCF	15	Martin Carpenter (Owen Roe's)
Substitutes:

GK	1	T. O'Neill
RCB	2	M. Eustace
FB	3	F. McCarthy
LCB	4	D. Morris
RHB	5	W. Donohoe
CHB	6	J. Hughes
LHB	7	J. Walsh
MF	8	W. Freaney
MF	9	J. Kehoe
RHF	10	P. Kennedy
CHF	11	M. O'Hanlon
LHF	12	R. Doyle
RCF	13	P. O'Neill
FF	14	M. Redmond
LCF	15	M. Doyle
Substitutes:
	16	J. Sinnott for Donohoe
	17	J. Kinsella for M. Doyle

=== All-Ireland Junior Football Championship ===
==== 'Home' Semi-Finals ====
25 August 1946	Down	1-05 – 0-07	Louth	St Tiernach's Park, Clones
				Referee: T. O'Reilly (Cavan)

GK	1	Emmet McGivern (Warrenpoint)
RCB	2	Paddy O'Hagan (Hilltown)
FB	3	Andy Murnin (Clonduff)
LCB	4	Harry Downey (Clann na Banna)
RHB	5	Gerry Brown (Newry Shamrocks)
CHB	6	Eamon Grant (Clonduff)
LHB	7	Noel McCarthy (Downpatrick)
MF	8	Gerry Carr (Warrenpoint) (c)
MF	9	Joe Haughian (Ballymartin)
RHF	10	Gerry Doherty (Ballykinlar)
CHF	11	Thomas Brown (Clonduff)
LHF	12	Des Downey (Clann na Banna)
RCF	13	Dan Kennedy (Glenn)
FF	14	Henry Brown (Clonduff)
LCF	15	Jimmy Heaney (Derrylecka)
Substitutes:

GK	1	Tom McQuaid (Seán O'Mahony's)
RCB	2	Peadar O'Callaghan (Dundalk Young Irelands)
FB	3	Joe Callan (St Colmcille's, Togher)
LCB	4	Jim McGee (Clan na Gael)
RHB	5	Tommy Hughes (Seán O'Mahony's)
CHB	6	Tommy Fitzgerald (Seán O'Mahony's)
LHB	7	Roger Lynch (Geraldines)
MF	8	Tom Walsh (Owen Roe's)
MF	9	Frank Smith (Drogheda Parnells)
RHF	10	Paddy McCourt (Seán O'Mahony's)
CHF	11	Peter Donnelly (Owen Roe's) (c)
LHF	12	Mickey Lennon (Geraldines)
RCF	13	Joe MacArtain (Dundalk Young Irelands)
FF	14	David McCreanor (Hunterstown Rovers)
LCF	15	Kevin Quinn (Hunterstown Rovers)
Substitutes:
	16	John Breen (Glyde Rangers) for MacArtain

25 August 1946 Semi-Final	Leitrim	2–11 - 2–07	Kerry	Carrick-on-Shannon, Leitrim

==== 'Home' Final ====
13 October 1946	Down	2–07 - 2–03	Leitrim	Breffni Park, Cavan

==== All-Ireland Final ====
27 October 1946	Down	2-10 – 1-09	Warwickshire	Croke Park
				Referee: F. Brophy (Dublin)

GK	1	Emmet McGivern (Warrenpoint)
RCB	2	Paddy O'Hagan (Hilltown)
FB	3	Andy Murnin (Clonduff)
LCB	4	Harry Downey (Clann na Banna)
RHB	5	Gerry Brown (Newry Shamrocks)
CHB	6	Eamon Grant (Clonduff)
LHB	7	Noel McCarthy (Downpatrick)
MF	8	Gerry Carr (Warrenpoint)
MF	9	Joe Haughian (Ballymartin)
RHF	10	Gerry Doherty (Ballykinlar)
CHF	11	Thomas Brown (Clonduff)
LHF	12	Des Downey (Clann na Banna)
RCF	13	Dan Kennedy (Glenn)
FF	14	Henry Brown (Clonduff)
LCF	15	Jimmy Heaney (Derrylecka)
Substitutes:
	16	Kevin O'Hare (Glenn) for McGivern
	17	Malachy Short (Newry Shamrocks) for Thomas Brown

GK	1	R. Tumulty (Westmeath)
RCB	2	R. Green (Clare)
FB	3	P.J. Foran (Clare)
LCB	4	T. Geraghty (Westmeath)
RHB	5	W. Halton (Cavan)
CHB	6	M. Hartney (Clare)
LHB	7	J. Lonergan (Waterford)
MF	8	P. Hartnett (Cork)
MF	9	A. Green (Wicklow)
RHF	10	P. Mooney (Dublin)
CHF	11	P. Judge (Mayo)
LHF	12	J. McDermott (Roscommon)
RCF	13	J. Casey (Kildare)
FF	14	M. O'Dowd (Clare)
LCF	15	J. O'Neill (Donegal)
Substitutes:
