= Wolfe Tones GAA (Drogheda) =

Louth-based Gaelic games club

Wolfe Tones GFC
- Bhulf Tón GFC
- Founded: 1922
- County: Louth
- Nickname: The Tones
- Colours: Royal blue and yellow
- Grounds: Páirc Bhoilfe Tóin, Platin Road, Drogheda
- Coordinates: 53.7037°N 6.3591°W

Playing kits
Standard colours

Senior Club Championships
	All Ireland	Leinster champions	Louth champions
Football:	-	-	6

Wolfe Tones GFC is a Gaelic Football club from Drogheda, County Louth, Ireland. It serves the residents of St Mary's Parish in south Drogheda and fields Gaelic football teams in competitions organised by Louth GAA One of the oldest GAA clubs in Louth, Wolfe Tones play gaelic football at all age levels from nursery to adult.

The club moved into their current home ground in 1952. It is located on Platin Road, beside the Boyne Valley Foods factory. The club's colors are royal blue and yellow.

== History ==
The club was founded in 1922 by former members of the Owen Roes club, which was formed in 1895 and originally played matches in the Meath Championship due to the lack of football in Louth. J.J. Grogan served as the first club president. Many of the players in the early years of the Wolfe Tones had been internees in Tintown No. 3 Camp at the Curragh during the Civil War. The new club waited two years until they had their first competitive match, against fellow Drogheda side Boyne Rangers in 1924. This was also their first competitive win, outscoring the Rangers by 1–07 to 1–03.

By 1940 they had won the Louth Senior Championship six times. The 1937 Championship-winning side consisted of: Patrick Maguire, Willie Crilly, Mickey McKeown (captain), Vincent Kerr, Tom McKeown, Paddy McManus, Patrick Sarsfield, Paddy Dwyer, Jimmy Mohan, Peadar Martin, Paddy McKeown, Hugh Fanning, Paddy McCann, Eugene Penders and Christy Faulkner.

Before the rapid expansion of Drogheda in the 20th century, the club had the whole southern side of Drogheda within its catchment area. Although a portion of Drogheda has always been in Meath, the only ceding of GAA county boundaries was signed off by Louth GAA in a 1979 agreement sanctioned in 1986 by Leinster GAA. No reasons have been publicly disclosed as to why the smallest GAA county in Ireland would give away any territory. By 1980, a further four Gaelic football clubs had been formed in Drogheda – Oliver Plunketts, Naomh Mhuire (now defunct), O'Raghallaighs and St Nicholas. This dilution of the GAA member base in Drogheda was a factor in the decline of the club's fortunes.

The club won the Louth Division 3B League title in 2021. Their progress continued in 2022, qualifying for the semi-final stage of the Junior Championship for the first time since 1993, coinciding with centenary celebrations.

In recent years the club has also entered Ladies' teams in Louth LGFA competitions.

2024 saw the Tones clinch a historic promotion to Intermediate ranks by winning the Junior Championship for the first time in their history, defeating John Mitchels by eight points in the final at Dunleer.

Representing Louth in the opening round of the Leinster Junior Club Football Championship, Wolfe Tones met Ballinagar, Junior champions of Offaly, in Tullamore on 9 November. The sides finished level after normal time, but Ballinagar emerged as two-point victors after extra-time had been played, 0–16 to 1–11.

== Inter-County level ==
Wolfe Tones players have contributed to several Louth successes in All-Ireland championships.

Frank Pentony and John Murray won All-Ireland Junior Football Championship medals as part of the county's first title-winning team at the grade in 1925.

Mickey McKeown - a member of the successful 1925 Louth Junior team while playing club football with Larks. He went on to win a Railway Cup medal with Leinster in 1928 and later captained Wolfe Tones to two Louth Senior Championship titles in 1931 and 1937. His brothers Nicky, Paddy and Tom also played for Louth. His son 'Muckle' was a Louth and O'Raghallaighs star of the Sixties and Seventies.

Paddy McManus - Donegal native, a regular in Louth's half-back line during the 1930s and 40s. Captained Louth in 1938. Won Senior Championship medal in 1937.

Peadar Martin - Corner-back, played in 1935 Leinster Championship final against Kildare.

Tom Burke - revolutionary, athlete, footballer, referee and county board official. Captained Louth in final of 1912 All-Ireland Junior Football Championship. Founder member of Wolfe Tones.

Frank 'Son' Byrne - made 25 Championship appearances for Louth and captained Wolfe Tones to the League and Championship double in 1927. Selected on the Irish gaelic football team for the 1924 Tailteann Games.

Vincent Kerr - right half-back on the Louth side that won the All-Ireland Junior Championship in 1932. Two years later, he won a second All-Ireland medal at the grade and was joined on the 1934 team by fellow Tones' man Joe Collins.

Michael Cunningham and James Reilly - members of the minor team that won Louth's first All-Ireland Minor Football Championship title in 1936.

Oliver Coombes was right corner-back and Michael Kelly centre half-back on the Louth team that won the 1961 All-Ireland Junior Football Championship.

Martin Cassidy - won an All-Ireland 'B' Championship medal with Louth in 1997.

== Honours ==
- Louth Senior Football Championship (6): 1925, 1926, 1927, 1929, 1931, 1937
- Louth Senior Football League (5): 1927, 1928, 1931, 1934, 1935
- Louth Junior Football Championship (1): 2024
- Louth Junior A Football League (1): 1962
- Kevin Mullen Shield (1): 2026
- O'Hanlon Cup (1): 1927
- Feis na Bóinne Cup (1): 1947
- Louth Junior 2B Football Championship (1): 2008
- Donagh Cup (1): 1987
- Louth Junior Football League Division 3B (1): 2021
- Louth Division 3 Shield (1): 2019
- Louth Minor Football Championship (1): 1946
- Louth Minor B Football Championship (1): 2000
- Louth Under-14 Football Championship (1): 1997
- Louth Under-16 Football Championship (1): 1999
- Louth Under-15 Football League (1): 2005
- Louth Minor Football League Division 4 (1): 2008

== Trivia ==
Former Republic of Ireland international Gary Kelly played underage football with Wolfe Tones.
