= 1957 All-Ireland Junior Football Championship =

All Ireland Champions
- Winners: Mayo (3rd win)
- Captain: Mick Loftus

All Ireland Runners-up
- Runners-up: Warwickshire
- Captain: Mick Wynne

Provincial Champions
- Munster: Cork
- Leinster: Louth
- Ulster: Cavan
- Connacht: Mayo

The 1957 All-Ireland Junior Football Championship was the 36th staging of the championship since its establishment by the GAA in 1912.

The competition format saw the four provincial champions compete in two 'Home' semi-finals, the winners of which then contested the All-Ireland 'Home' final at Croke Park.

In the last stage of the competition, the victorious 'Home' finalists then met the champions of Britain to determine who would be crowned overall All-Ireland Junior Football Champions for 1957.

The title match concluded with Mayo defeating Warwickshire, the champions of Britain, on a scoreline of 2–07 to 2–05.

== Results ==
=== Munster Junior Football Championship ===
7 July 1957 Final	Cork	1–07 - 0–07	Limerick	Buttevant

=== Leinster Junior Football Championship ===
28 July 1957 Final	Louth	2–06 - 1–05	Kilkenny	St. Conleth's Park, Newbridge
	O. Moran 2-2, J. Crosbie 0-3, J. Judge 0-1		S. Fleming 1-1, B. Fitzgerald 0-3, P. Butler 0-1	Referee: T. Walsh Laois

GK	1	John McEnteggart (Lann Léire)
RCB	2	Eugene Duffy (Dundalk Gaels)
FB	3	Fintan Wynne (St Bride's)
LCB	4	Oliver Judge (Newtown Blues)
RHB	5	Phil Lynch (Geraldines)
CHB	6	Benny Toal (Clan na Gael)
LHB	7	Joe Sweeney (Darver Volunteers)
MF	8	Peter Judge (Newtown Blues)
MF	9	Patsy McDonnell (Oliver Plunketts)
RHF	10	Niall Craven (Roche Emmets)
CHF	11	Mickey Gartlan (Roche Emmets)
LHF	12	John Crosbie (St Fechin's)
RCF	13	Johnny Gartlan (Roche Emmets)
FF	14	Jim Judge (Newtown Blues)
LCF	15	Owen Moran (Glyde Rangers)
Substitutes:
	16	John Doran (Seán McDermott's) for Toal
	17	Aidan Cullen (Oliver Plunketts) for Johnny Gartlan

GK	1	Dan Croke (St Canice's)
RCB	2	Willie Fitzgerald (Glenmore)
FB	3	Mick Egan (Cotterstown)
LCB	4	Andy Heffernan (Muckalee)
RHB	5	Paddy Somers (Coolagh)
CHB	6	Mick Fitzgerald (Glenmore)
LHB	7	Seán Kennedy (St Canice's)
MF	8	Martin Meally (Railyard)
MF	9	Luke Morrissey (Graignamanagh)
RHF	10	Seán Higgins (Graignamanagh)
CHF	11	Paul Fitzgerald (Glenmore) (c)
LHF	12	Podge Butler (Kilmoganny)
RCF	13	Billy Fitzgerald (Brownstown)
FF	14	Lar Murphy (St Canice's)
LCF	15	Seán Fleming (Graignamanagh)
Substitutes:
	16	Paddy Walsh (Railyard) for Kennedy

=== Ulster Junior Football Championship ===
2 June 1957 Final	Cavan	3–06 - 2–02	Donegal	Irvinestown

=== Connacht Junior Football Championship ===
21 July 1957 Final	Mayo	2–08 - 2–06	Galway	Castlebar

=== All-Ireland Junior Football Championship ===
==== 'Home' Semi-Finals ====
18 August 1957	Mayo	2–07 - 1–06	Louth	Croke Park

4 August 1957	Cork	1–06 - 0–07	Cavan	Cork Athletic Grounds

==== 'Home' Final ====
8 September 1957	Mayo	1–11 - 1–03	Cork	Croke Park

All-Ireland Final

29 September 1957	Mayo	2–07 - 2–05	Warwickshire	Glebe Farm, Birmingham
	M. Loftus 1-1, J. McGrath 1-0, J. Munnelly 0-3, P. McManamon 0-2, J. Biesty 0-1		P.J. Burke 2-0, G. McGuigan 0-3, L. Brogan, A. O'Neill 0-1 each	Referee: Peter McDermott (Meath)

GK	1	Eamonn Watters (Ballina Stephenites)
RCB	2	Ivan McCaffrey (Ardnaree Sarsfields)
FB	3	Colm O'Toole (Louisburgh)
LCB	4	Seán Healy (Ballyhaunis)
RHB	5	Tom Lyons (Castlebar Mitchels)
CHB	6	John McAndrew (Ballina Stephenites)
LHB	7	Páraic Gannon (Ballaghaderreen)
MF	8	Tom Quigley (Castlebar Mitchels)
MF	9	Padraic Maye (The Neale)
RHF	10	Douglas McManus (Swinford)
CHF	11	Paddy McManamon (Crossmolina Deel Rovers)
LHF	12	Johnny Biesty (Ballyhaunis)
RCF	13	Josie Munnelly (Castlebar Mitchels)
FF	14	Mick Loftus (Crossmolina Deel Rovers)
LCF	15	John McGrath (Kilmaine)
Substitutes:
	16	Patsy Fallon (Garrymore) for Fay

GK	1	Mick Flaherty (Offaly)
RCB	2	Ricky Burke (Dublin)
FB	3	Jim Wynne (Offaly)
LCB	4	Jim Gately (Roscommon)
RHB	5	Tommy O'Donoghue (Kildare)
CHB	6	Eamonn Conway (Kildare)
LHB	7	Brendan Kennedy (Kerry)
MF	8	Anthony O'Neill (Donegal)
MF	9	P. McMurrough (Westmeath)
RHF	10	Gus O'Malley (Mayo)
CHF	11	Mick Wynne (Offaly)
LHF	12	Mick West (Cavan)
RCF	13	George McGuigan (Tyrone)
FF	14	Liam Brogan (Donegal)
LCF	15	P.J. Burke (Donegal)
Substitutes:
	16	Tommy Quinn (Donegal) for Kennedy
