= 1985 All-Ireland Junior Football Championship =

All Ireland Champions
- Winners: Galway (4th win)
- Captain: Conor O'Dea
- Manager: Billy Joyce

All Ireland Runners-up
- Runners-up: Warwickshire

Provincial Champions
- Munster: Kerry
- Leinster: Dublin
- Ulster: Armagh
- Connacht: Galway

The 1985 All-Ireland Junior Football Championship was the 55th staging of the All-Ireland Junior Championship since its establishment by the Gaelic Athletic Association in 1912.

Cork entered the championship as the defending champions but lost to Kerry in the opening round of the Munster Championship.

The All-Ireland final was played in Tuam on 6 October 1985 between Galway and Warwickshire, in what was the first ever meeting in a final between the two counties. Galway won the match by twenty-five points to claim their first title at the grade since 1965 and a fourth overall.

== Results ==
=== Munster Junior Football Championship ===
21 June 1985 Final	Kerry	0-07 - 0-07	Tipperary	Moyvane, Kerry
				Referee: P. Lane (Limerick)

28 June 1985 Final (replay)	Tipperary	1-04 - 1-05	Kerry	Seán Treacy Park, Tipperary
				Referee: R. Moloney (Limerick)

=== Leinster Junior Football Championship ===
12 June 1985 Final	Dublin	3-16 - 2-04	Louth	Páirc Tailteann, Navan
	C. Richardson 2-1, D. Delappe 1-5, J. Sheedy, J. Watson, E. McHugh 0-2 each, C. Griffin, D. McCarthy, A. Costello, M. Cooke 0-1 each		S. McGahon 1-1, P. Hand 1-0, S. Melia, J. O'Donoghue, F. Taaffe 0-1 each	Referee: P. Kavanagh (Meath)

GK	1	Brian Campbell (Beann Éadair)
RCB	2	Tomás Mannion (Ballymun Kickhams)
FB	3	Martin Cooke (Kilmore)
LCB	4	Peter Nolan (Robert Emmets)
RHB	5	Ciarán Griffin (Fingal Ravens)
CHB	6	Tom Byrne (An Caisleán)
LHB	7	Donal McCarthy (Scoil Uí Chonaill)
MF	8	Anthony White (Clann Mhuire)
MF	9	Anthony Costello (Naomh Fionnbarra)
RHF	10	David Delappe (St Anne's)
CHF	11	Edward McHugh (An Caisleán)
LHF	12	Jack Sheedy Lucan Sarsfields)
RCF	13	Joe Watson (Skerries Harps)
FF	14	Richie Crean (Lucan Sarsfields)
LCF	15	Ciarán Richardson (Robert Emmets)

GK	1	Mal Clarke (Oliver Plunketts)
RCB	2	Tom Conlon (Naomh Malachi)
FB	3	Declan Healy (Naomh Máirtín)
LCB	4	Jim Matthews (Hunterstown Rovers)
RHB	5	Barry O'Brien (Seán O'Mahony's)
CHB	6	Mickey Rossiter (Oliver Plunketts) (c)
LHB	7	Stephen Matthews (St Kevin's)
MF	8	Stephen Melia (John Mitchels)
MF	9	Brian Gorham (Dundalk Young Irelands)
RHF	10	John O'Donoghue (Oliver Plunketts)
CHF	11	Denis Kelleher (Dreadnots)
LHF	12	Vincent O'Connor (Dundalk Young Irelands)
RCF	13	Gerry Reynolds (Stabannon Parnells)
FF	14	Frank Taaffe (Oliver Plunketts)
LCF	15	Seán McGahon (Seán McDermott's)
Substitutes:
	16	Pádraig Califf (Dreadnots) for O'Connor
	17	Pat Hand (Naomh Fionnbarra) for Reynolds
	18	Noel Healy (Naomh Máirtín) for Gorham

=== Ulster Junior Football Championship ===
7 June 1985 Final	Armagh	2-09 - 0-12	Donegal	Healy Park, Omagh
				Referee: S. Corr (Tyrone)

=== Connacht Junior Football Championship ===
11 May 1985 Final	Leitrim	0-07 - 0-10	Galway	Páirc Seán Mac Diarmada, Carrick-on-Shannon
				Referee: S. McCusker (Mayo)

=== All-Ireland semi-finals ===
6 July 1985	Dublin	2-08 - 1-13	Galway	Parnell Park, Dublin
				Referee: M. Greenan (Cavan)

6 July 1985	Kerry	1-08 - 0-07	Armagh	Strand Road, Tralee
				Referee: S. O'Grady (Galway)

=== All-Ireland home final ===
18 August 1985 Final	Galway	0-09 - 0-09	Kerry	Gaelic Grounds, Limerick
				Referee: C. Conlon (Westmeath)

8 September 1985 Final (replay)	Galway	0-11 - 0-07	Kerry	Croke Park, Dublin
				Referee: C. Conlon (Westmeath)

=== All-Ireland final ===
6 October 1985 Final	Galway	4-17 - 0-04	Warwickshire	Tuam Stadium, Galway
	T. McHugh 0-10, F. Stockwell, P. O'Dea 1-2 each, G. Burke 1-1, H. Bleheane 1-0, C. O'Dea, S. Burke 0-1 each		E. Tolan 0-2, D. Brennan, S. Dunne 0-1 each	Referee: P. Lane (Limerick)
