= 1925 All-Ireland Junior Football Championship =

All Ireland Champions
- Winners: Louth (1st win)
- Captain: Jack Lynch

All Ireland Runners-up
- Runners-up: Mayo
- Captain: J. Gallagher

Provincial Champions
- Munster: Clare
- Leinster: Louth
- Ulster: Armagh
- Connacht: Mayo

The 1925 All-Ireland Junior Football Championship was the 8th staging of the championship since its establishment by the GAA in 1912.

The competition format saw the four provincial champions face off in two semi-finals, the winners of which then contested the All-Ireland final.

The title match at Croke Park on 20 June 1926 ended in a one-point victory for Louth over the Connacht champions Mayo, on a scoreline of 2–06 to 2–05.

== Results ==
=== Munster Junior Football Championship ===
13 September Final	Clare	0–06 - 0–05	Cork	Killarney

=== Ulster Junior Football Championship ===
25 October Final	Armagh	2–03 - 2–01	Cavan	St Tiernach's Park, Clones

=== Connacht Junior Football Championship ===
15 November Final	Mayo	3–05 - 1–00	Leitrim	Roscommon

=== Leinster Junior Football Championship ===
1 November Final	Louth	1-03 – 0-04	Dublin	Navan Showgrounds
	J. Lynch 1-0, J. McMahon, M. Quilton, T. Sharkey 0-1 each		J. Doran 0-2, P. Moore, F. Patten 0-1 each	Referee: J. Curran (Meath)

GK	1	Nick Hughes (Isles of the Sea)
RCB	2	Tom Rath (Castlebellingham)
FB	3	George Mandeville (Con Colberts)
LCB	4	Mickey McKeown (Larks)
RHB	5	Johnny Murray (Wolfe Tones)
CHB	6	John Tuite (Castlebellingham)
LHB	7	Edward Kane (Boyne Rangers)
MF	8	Matty Lynch (Con Colberts)
MF	9	Paddy Connor (Unknowns)
RHF	10	John McMahon (Con Colberts)
CHF	11	Jack Lynch (Castlebellingham) (c)
LHF	12	Paddy Coleman (St Dominic's, Dundalk)
RCF	13	Tom Sharkey (Boyne Rangers)
FF	14	James Stephens (Castlebellingham)
LCF	15	Michael Quilton (St Dominic's, Dundalk)

GK	1	William Collins (O'Dwyer's)
RCB	2	Michael Cullen (O'Dwyer's) (c)
FB	3	Peter Moore (St Joseph's)
LCB	4	George Knight (O'Dwyer's)
RHB	5	Frank Patten (Milltown Emmets)
CHB	6	Pat Byrne (Milltown Emmets)
LHB	7	George Canavan (Milltown Emmets)
MF	8	Pat Byrne (Dolphins)
MF	9	John Brady (Dolphins)
RHF	10	Arthur Dixon (Kincora)
CHF	11	Sam Baneham (Kincora)
LHF	12	Stephen Nolan (Brian Boru's)
RCF	13	John Doran (Round Towers, Clondalkin)
FF	14	Morgan Durnin (O'Tooles)
LCF	15	Barney Higgins (Seán McDermotts)

=== All-Ireland Junior Football Championship ===
==== Semi-Finals ====
4 April 1926	Louth	1-06 – 1-03	Armagh	Gaelic Grounds, Drogheda

6 June 1926	Mayo	1-04 – 1-02	Clare	Croke Park, Dublin

==== All-Ireland Final ====
20 June 1926	Louth	2-06 – 2-05	Mayo	Croke Park, Dublin
	B. Doyle, J. Trainor 1-2 each, J. Lynch 0-2

GK	1	Nick Hughes (Isles of the Sea)
RCB	2	Michael Tuite (Dundalk John Dillons)
FB	3	Tom Rath (Castlebellingham)
LCB	4	Mickey McKeown (Larks)
RHB	5	Edward Kane (Boyne Rangers)
CHB	6	John Halligan (Larks)
LHB	7	Joe Heaney (Ardee)
MF	8	Matty Lynch (Con Colberts)
MF	9	Johnny Murray (Wolfe Tones)
RHF	10	John Trainor (Dundalk John Dillons)
CHF	11	Jack Lynch (Castlebellingham) (c)
LHF	12	Frank Pentony (Wolfe Tones)
RCF	13	John McMahon (Con Colberts)
FF	14	Pat Butterly (Castlebellingham)
LCF	15	Bill Doyle (Boyne Rangers)

GK	1	G. Courell
RCB	2	M. Barrett
FB	3	P. Hoban
LCB	4	J. Carr
RHB	5	R. Coleman
CHB	6	J. Burke
LHB	7	T. Carty
MF	8	M. Chambers
MF	9	P. Biggins
RHF	10	E. Hogan
CHF	11	J. McGahern
LHF	12	J. Gallagher (c)
RCF	13	C. Armstrong
FF	14	M.J. Horan
LCF	15	M. Moran
