= 1934 All-Ireland Junior Football Championship =

All Ireland Champions
- Winners: Louth (3rd win)
- Captain: Jim Doyle

All Ireland Runners-up
- Runners-up: London

Provincial Champions
- Munster: Kerry
- Leinster: Louth
- Ulster: Down
- Connacht: Mayo

The 1934 All-Ireland Junior Football Championship was the 17th staging of the championship since its establishment by the GAA in 1912.

The competition format saw the four provincial champions compete in two 'Home' semi-finals, the winners of which then contested the All-Ireland 'Home' final.

In the last stage of the competition, the victorious 'Home' finalists then met the champions of Britain to determine who would be crowned overall All-Ireland Junior Football Champions for 1934.

The title match concluded with Louth defeating London, the representatives of Britain, on a scoreline of 1–03 to 0–03. This was Louth's third triumph in the competition, following the county's earlier successes in 1925 and 1932.

== Results ==
=== Munster Junior Football Championship ===
Final	Kerry	2–12 - 0–01	Waterford

=== Ulster Junior Football Championship ===
Final	Down	1–04 - 0–09 *	Donegal

- Replay ordered after an objection by Down

9 September
Replay

Down	4–06 - 3–05	Donegal

The Marshes, Newry
Referee: H. McEneaney (Monaghan)

=== Connacht Junior Football Championship ===
Final	Mayo	2–05 - 1–06	Roscommon

=== Leinster Junior Football Championship ===
26 August Final	Louth	2-04 – 1-07	Kildare	Naas, County Kildare

9 September Replay	Louth	1-07 – 0-05	Kildare	Gaelic Grounds, Drogheda
	P. Moore 1-1, P. Mullen 0-2, M. Callaghan, P. Cluskey, J. Curran, N. Mulligan 0-1 each		T. Carroll 0-3 (1f), J. Dowling 0-1, P. Thorpe 0-1	Referee: W. Carey (Westmeath)

GK	1	Hugh Callan (Dundalk Gaels)
RCB	2	Peter Tuite (O'Connells)
FB	3	Tom Tiernan (Hitchestown)
LCB	4	Jim Doyle (Dundalk Gaels) (c)
RHB	5	Nick Mulligan (Dundalk Young Irelands)
CHB	6	Jimmy Beirne (St Mary's)
LHB	7	Vincent Kerr (Wolfe Tones)
MF	8	Jim Curran (Dundalk Gaels)
MF	9	Paddy Mullen (St Magdalene's)
RHF	10	Mick Callaghan (Cooley Kickhams)
CHF	11	John Gartland (Darver Young Irelands)
LHF	12	Patrick Cluskey (St Magdalene's)
RCF	13	Patsy McKevitt (Cooley Kickhams)
FF	14	Paddy Moore (St Magdalene's)
LCF	15	Anthony Lawless (Dundalk Gaels)

GK	1	Barney Cullen (Celbridge)
RCB	2	Edward Malone (Leixlip)
FB	3	Frank Dowling (Robertstown)
LCB	4	Patrick Harrison (Monasterevan)
RHB	5	Patrick Broderick (Graiguecullen, Laois)
CHB	6	William Byrne (Robertstown)
LHB	7	Michael Colleton (Roseberry)
MF	8	James Mullaly (Kildangan)
MF	9	Michael Geraghty (Roseberry)
RHF	10	John Dillon (Suncroft)
CHF	11	Thomas Carroll (Westerns, Dublin)
LHF	12	Peter Burke (St Paul's, Dublin)
RCF	13	James Dowling (Robertstown)
FF	14	Patrick Geraghty (Roseberry) (c)
LCF	15	Paddy Thorpe (Seán McDermotts, Dublin)

=== All-Ireland Junior Football Championship ===
23 September Semi-Final	Louth	4–11 - 0–09	Down	Croke Park, Dublin

30 September Semi-Final	Kerry	2–08 - 1–04	Mayo

14 October Home Final	Louth	0–09 - 1–04	Kerry	Croke Park, Dublin
				Referee: Sean Robbins (Offaly)

GK	1	Hugh Callan (Dundalk Gaels)
RCB	2	Peter Tuite (O'Connells)
FB	3	Tom Tiernan (Hitchestown)
LCB	4	Jim Doyle (Dundalk Gaels) (c)
RHB	5	Vincent Kerr (Wolfe Tones)
CHB	6	Jimmy Beirne (St Mary's)
LHB	7	Paddy Byrne (Newtown Blues)
MF	8	Paddy Mullen (St Magdalene's)
MF	9	Jim Curran (Dundalk Gaels)
RHF	10	Mick Callaghan (Cooley Kickhams)
CHF	11	Joe Collins (Wolfe Tones)
LHF	12	Patrick Cluskey (St Magdalene's)
RCF	13	James McKevitt (Cooley Kickhams)
FF	14	Paddy Moore (St Magdalene's)
LCF	15	Tom Dowdall (Glyde Rangers)

GK	1	Brendan Reidy (Austin Stacks)
RCB	2	Pats Mahony (John Mitchels)
FB	3	Simon Moynihan (Kerins O'Rahilly's)
LCB	4	Jer Fitzgerald (Kerins O'Rahilly's)
RHB	5	Dan Joe McCarthy (John Mitchels)
CHB	6	Tommy Barrett (Austin Stacks)
LHB	7	Michael O'Shea (Dingle)
MF	8	William Brosnan (Kerins O'Rahilly's)
MF	9	Seán Brosnan (Dingle)
RHF	10	Tim O'Leary (Killarney Legion)
CHF	11	Tommy 'Foxy" Murphy (John Mitchels)
LHF	12	Paddy Kennedy (Kerins O'Rahilly's)
RCF	13	Peter Ronan (Kerins O'Rahilly's)
FF	14	Jackie McKenna (Dingle)
LCF	15	Micheál Ó'Ruairc (John Mitchels)
Substitutes:
	16	Mick McDonnell (Austin Stacks) for Fitzgerald

==== All-Ireland Final ====
4 November	Louth	1–03 - 0–03	London	St Conleth's Park, Newbridge
	P. Moore 1-0, M. Callaghan, P. Cluskey, P. McKevitt 0-1 each		W. Kelly 0-2, P. Mulpeter 0-1	Referee: P. Waters (Kildare)

GK	1	Hugh Callan (Dundalk Gaels)
RCB	2	Peter Tuite (O'Connells)
FB	3	Tom Tiernan (Hitchestown)
LCB	4	Jim Doyle (Dundalk Gaels) (c)
RHB	5	Vincent Kerr (Wolfe Tones)
CHB	6	Jimmy Beirne (St Mary's)
LHB	7	Paddy Byrne (Newtown Blues)
MF	8	Paddy Mullen (St Magdalene's)
MF	9	Paddy Clarke (St Bride's)
RHF	10	Mick Callaghan (Cooley Kickhams)
CHF	11	Joe Collins (Wolfe Tones)
LHF	12	Patrick Cluskey (St Magdalene's)
RCF	13	James McKevitt (Cooley Kickhams)
FF	14	Paddy Moore (St Magdalene's)
LCF	15	Patsy McKevitt (Cooley Kickhams)
Substitutes:
	16	George Berrills (Dundalk Gaels) for Byrne

GK	1	J. Smith
RCB	2	T. Shields (Kildare)
FB	3	G. Murphy (Kildare) (c)
LCB	4	T. Behan (Kildare)
RHB	5	P. Carroll (Kildare)
CHB	6	P. Mulpeter (Kildare)
LHB	7	L. Murphy (Kildare)
MF	8	J. Roche (Kildare)
MF	9	J. Murphy (Wexford)
RHF	10	D. Buckley (Cork)
CHF	11	J. Walsh (Cork)
LHF	12	J. Fitzpatrick (Wicklow)
RCF	13	P. Devlin (Tyrone)
FF	14	W. Kelly (Meath)
LCF	15	C. Carpenter (Meath)
