= 2017 All-Ireland Junior Football Championship =

Irish Football Championship

All Ireland Champions
- Winners: Kerry (18th win)
- Captain: Killian Spillane
- Manager: Jimmy Keane

All Ireland Runners-up
- Runners-up: Meath
- Captain: Dáire Rowe
- Manager: Conor O'Donoghue

Provincial Champions
- Munster: Kerry
- Leinster: Meath
- Ulster: Not Played
- Connacht: Leitrim

The 2017 All-Ireland Junior Football Championship was the 87th staging of the All-Ireland Junior Championship since its establishment by the Gaelic Athletic Association in 1912.

Kerry entered the championship as the defending champions.

The All-Ireland final was played on 5 August 2017 at Croke Park in Dublin, between Kerry and Meath, in what was their first ever meeting in the final. Kerry won the match by 2–19 to 1–14 to claim their 18th championship title overall and a third consecutive title.

== Results ==
=== Munster Junior Football Championship ===
27 June 2017 Final (After Extra-time)	Kerry	4–24 - 3–20	Cork	Páirc Uí Rinn, Cork
				Referee: S. Lonergan (Tipperary)

=== Leinster Junior Football Championship ===
25 June 2017 Final	Meath	0–19 - 0–10	Louth	Croke Park, Dublin
	D. Rowe 0-5 (2f), J. Conlon 0-4, K. Ross (1f) P. Kennelly 0-3 each, N. Shortall, B. Brennan (f), M. Flood, D. Toner 0-1 each		W. Woods 0-5 (4f), A. O'Brien, D. O'Connell 0-2 each, C. Giggins 0-1	Referee: F. Barry (Longford)

GK	1	Johnny Lynch (Moynalty)
RCB	2	Adam Lynch (St Colmcille's)
FB	3	Luke Moran (Trim)
LCB	4	Michael Flood (St Brigid's)
RHB	5	David Toner (Curraha)
CHB	6	Joe Sweeney (St Colmcille's)
LHB	7	Kevin Traynor (Syddan)
MF	8	Adam Flanagan (Clonard)
MF	9	Conor Farrell (Dunderry)
RHF	10	Paddy Kennelly (Dunderry)
CHF	11	Ben Brennan (St Colmcille's)
LHF	12	Cathal McConnell (Bective)
RCF	13	James Conlon (St Colmcille's)
FF	14	Dáire Rowe (Syddan) (c)
LCF	15	Kevin Ross (Castletown)
Substitutes:
	16	Stephen Coogan (Dunderry) for Conlon
	17	Neil Shortall (Curraha) for McConnell
	18	Declan Smyth (Dunsany) for Traynor
	19	Willie Carry (Drumbaragh Emmets) for Brennan
	20	Jamie Reilly (St Michael's) for Lynch
	21	Ciaran O'Rourke (Trim) for Toner
Manager:
Conor O'Donoghue

GK	1	Robert Sansom (St Joseph's)
RCB	2	Barry Reynolds (Oliver Plunketts)
FB	3	Kieran Lenehan (Naomh Fionnbarra)
LCB	4	Niall McCabe (St Fechin's)
RHB	5	Niall Sharkey (Glyde Rangers)
CHB	6	David Quigley (Roche Emmets) (c)
LHB	7	Micheál McDonnell (Clan na Gael)
MF	8	Robert Brodigan (Oliver Plunketts)
MF	9	Daniel O'Connell (Roche Emmets)
RHF	10	Ciarán Sheridan (Glyde Rangers)
CHF	11	Dean Maguire (Dundalk Young Irelands)
LHF	12	Colm Giggins (Stabannon Parnells)
RCF	13	Cian Callan (St Kevin's)
FF	14	Conal O'Hanlon (St Joseph's)
LCF	15	William Woods (Naomh Fionnbarra)
Substitutes:
	16	Conor Early (Oliver Plunketts) for Maguire
	17	Mark Hoey (St Bride's) for Reynolds
	18	Hugh Osborne (Naomh Fionnbarra) for Lenehan
	19	Aaron O'Brien (Mattock Rangers) for Callan
	20	Peter Nixon (Dundalk Young Irelands) for Giggins
	21	Cillian Kirk (St Bride's) for McCabe
Manager:
Ollie McDonnell

=== Connacht Junior Football Championship ===
17 May 2017	Leitrim	1–16 - 0–16	Mayo	Fr. O'Hara Memorial Park, Charlestown
				Referee: J. Molloy (Galway)

=== All-Ireland Semi-Finals ===
22 July 2017	Meath	2–21 - 2–08	Kilkenny	Nowlan Park, Kilkenny
				Referee: P. Faloon (Down)

22 July 2017	Kerry	1–16 - 1–09	Leitrim	Gaelic Grounds, Limerick
				Referee: B. Tiernan (Dublin)

=== All-Ireland Final ===
5 August 2017	Kerry	2–19 - 1–14	Meath	O'Moore Park, Portlaoise
	C. Cox 1-8 (3f), T. Ó'Sé 1-2, K. Spillane, P. O'Connor 0-3 each, E. Ó'Conchúir, P. Kilkenny, I. Parker 0-1 each		B. Brennan 0-6 (2'45, 1f), J. Conlon 0-4, S. Reilly 1-0, D. Rowe, W. Carry, K. Ross, D. Healy 0-1 each	Referee: J. Hickey (Carlow)
