= Polo at the 1958 British Empire and Commonwealth Games =

- Venue: Llandaff Fields
- Dates: 23 July 1958
- Competitors: 8 from 1 nation

Polo was a demonstration sport at the 1958 British Empire and Commonwealth Games in Cardiff. It took place at Llandaff Fields in Cardiff at 23 July 1958. It was the first time Polo has featured as part of the games.

== Match ==
Cowdray Park played Cirencester Park. Cowdray Park won the match 4–3.

=== The squads ===
Cowdray Park
Lt.-Col. Peter Dollar
Mr John Lakin
Rao Jaia Hanut Singh
H.R.H. the Duke of Edinburgh

Cirencester Park
The Hon. George Bathurst
Lt.-Col. A. H. McConnel
Colonel Prem Singh
Mr. Wyndham Lacey
