= 1928 All-Ireland Junior Football Championship =

11th edition of All-Ireland Junior Football Championship

All Ireland Champions
- Winners: Kerry (4th win)
- Captain: Donnacha O'Donoghue

All Ireland Runners-up
- Runners-up: Louth
- Captain: Paddy Connor

Provincial Champions
- Munster: Kerry
- Leinster: Louth
- Ulster: Not Played
- Connacht: Sligo

The 1928 All-Ireland Junior Football Championship was the 11th staging of the championship since its establishment by the GAA in 1912.

As the Ulster GAA council did not hold a provincial championship, the fourth semi-final spot was therefore taken by London, as champions of Britain.

The title match at Croke Park on 2 December 1928 ended in a five-point victory for Kerry over the Leinster champions Louth, on a scoreline of 2–08 to 2–03.

This was the Kingdom's fourth All-Ireland Junior football title.

== Results ==
=== Munster Junior Football Championship ===
16 September Final	Kerry	3–02 - 0–04	Waterford	Fraher Field, Dungarvan

=== Connacht Junior Football Championship ===
5 August Final	Sligo	1–03 - 0–01	Mayo	Tuam

=== Leinster Junior Football Championship ===
July 29 Final	Louth	1-05 – 1-04	Dublin	Gaelic Grounds, Drogheda
	M. Hearty 0-4 (2f), J. Moonan 1-0, P. Byrne 0-1 (f)			Referee: J. Curran (Meath)

GK	1	Séamus Flood (Clan na Gael)
RCB	2	Kevin Morgan (Ramblers)
FB	3	Joe Downey (Sarsfields)
LCB	4	Tom Carroway (Sarsfields)
RHB	5	James Cluskey (Dromiskin Unknowns) (c)
CHB	6	Eddie Bishop (Sarsfields)
LHB	7	James Canavan (Sarsfields)
MF	8	Tom Matthews (Dromiskin Unknowns)
MF	9	James Gunning (Sarsfields)
RHF	10	Joe Byrne (St Bride's)
CHF	11	Tom Maguire (Hitchestown)
LHF	12	Matt Hearty (Clan na Gael)
RCF	13	Joe Cunningham (Dromiskin Unknowns)
FF	14	Jem Moonan (Larks)
LCF	15	Peter Byrne (St Bride's)

GK	1	J. Mulhall (St Joseph's)
RCB	2	S. Whiston (St Joseph's)
FB	3	J. Macken (St Joseph's)
LCB	4	T. Newman (St Joseph's)
RHB	5	C. Duffy (St Joseph's)
CHB	6	P. Moore (St Joseph's)
LHB	7	W. Dowling (Round Towers, Clondalkin)
MF	8	P. Hickey (Round Towers, Clondalkin)
MF	9	C. Rochfort (St Joseph's) (c)
RHF	10	J. O'Rourke (St Laurence's)
CHF	11	F. Cavanagh (Dolphins)
LHF	12	P. Rogers (Dolphins)
RCF	13	T. McConnon (Westerns)
FF	14	J. McCann (Parnells)
LCF	15	P. Kearney (Parnells)
Substitutes:
	16	W. Moore (St Joseph's)

=== All-Ireland Junior Football Championship ===
==== Semi-Finals ====
4 November	Kerry	4-10 – 2-03	London	Highgate, London

4 November	Louth	2-09 – 0-02	Sligo	Croke Park, Dublin

==== All-Ireland Final ====
2 December	Kerry	2-08 – 2-03	Louth	Croke Park
	M. Doyle 2-1, J. O'Sullivan 0-3, M. Healy, T. Landers, J. Price, J. Quill 0-1 each		H. Bailey, P. Byrne 1-0 each, J. Byrne, P. Connor, M. Hearty 0-1 each	Referee: T. Shevlin (Roscommon)

GK	1	Willie McSweeney (Austin Stacks)
RCB	2	Tommy Barrett (Austin Stacks)
FB	3	Donnacha O'Donoghue (John Mitchels) (c)
LCB	4	Dick Savage (Kerins O'Rahilly's)
RHB	5	Tom Curran (Laune Rangers)
CHB	6	Jack Horan (Currow)
LHB	7	Mick Healy (Austin Stacks)
MF	8	Tim O'Donnell (Camp)
MF	9	Jackie Price (Kerins O'Rahilly's)
RHF	10	Dicko Clifford (Dr Crokes)
CHF	11	Miko Doyle (Austin Stacks)
LHF	12	James Quill (Kerins O'Rahilly's)
RCF	13	John O'Sullivan (Moyvane)
FF	14	John Murphy (Kerins O'Rahilly's)
LCF	15	Tim Landers (Austin Stacks)

GK	1	James Callaghan (Dromiskin Unknowns)
RCB	2	Paddy Connor (Dromiskin Unknowns) (c)
FB	3	Matt Roche (Sarsfields)
LCB	4	Joe Downey (Sarsfields)
RHB	5	Tom Carroway (Sarsfields)
CHB	6	James Cluskey (Dromiskin Unknowns)
LHB	7	Eddie Bishop (Sarsfields)
MF	8	James Canavan (Sarsfields)
MF	9	Tom Matthews (Dromiskin Unknowns)
RHF	10	Matt Hearty (Clan na Gael)
CHF	11	Joe Byrne (St Bride's)
LHF	12	John Mullen (Boyne Rangers)
RCF	13	James Gunning (Sarsfields)
FF	14	Peter Byrne (St Bride's)
LCF	15	Herbert Bailey (Boyne Rangers)
