= 1932 All-Ireland Junior Football Championship =

All Ireland Champions
- Winners: Louth (2nd win)
- Captain: Peter Byrne

All Ireland Runners-up
- Runners-up: London
- Captain: Daniel Fitzpatrick

Provincial Champions
- Munster: Cork
- Leinster: Louth
- Ulster: Cavan
- Connacht: Roscommon

The 1932 All-Ireland Junior Football Championship was the 15th staging of the championship since its establishment by the GAA in 1912.

The competition format saw the four provincial champions compete in two 'Home' semi-finals, the winners of which then contested the All-Ireland 'Home' final.

In the last stage of the competition, the victorious 'Home' finalists then met the champions of Britain to determine who would be crowned overall All-Ireland Junior Football Champions for 1932.

The title match at the Drogheda Gaelic Grounds concluded with Louth defeating London, the representatives of Britain, on a scoreline of 0–06 to 0–04. London had led by four points at half-time. This was Louth's second triumph in the competition, following on from the county's initial success in 1925.

== Results ==
=== Munster Junior Football Championship ===
| Final | Cork | 1–05 - 1–03 | Kerry |

=== Ulster Junior Football Championship ===
| Final | Cavan | 2–05 - 1–01 | Down |

=== Connacht Junior Football Championship ===
| Final | Roscommon | 2–09 - 0–04 | Sligo |

=== Leinster Junior Football Championship ===
| 31 July 1932 Final | Louth | 2-07 – 1-05 | Carlow | Croke Park, Dublin |
| 3pm | P. Mullen 1-6 (2f), J. Tiernan 1-0, P. Byrne 0-1 | | T. Walker 1-3 (3f), J. Lawlor, M. Price 0-1 | Referee: P. Cowan (Westmeath) |

| GK | 1 | Mick Leech (Owen Roe's) |
| RCB | 2 | Pat Dunne (St Mary's) |
| FB | 3 | Willie Crilly (Owen Roe's) |
| LCB | 4 | Tom McArdle (St Magdalene's) |
| RHB | 5 | John Smith (Hitchestown) |
| CHB | 6 | Joe Byrne (St Bride's) |
| LHB | 7 | Paddy Cluskey (Dromiskin Unknowns) |
| MF | 8 | Kevin Morgan (Hitchestown) |
| MF | 9 | Paddy Devlin (Kilcurry) |
| RHF | 10 | Tom McKeown (Owen Roe's) |
| CHF | 11 | Jimmy Mullen (Owen Roe's) |
| LHF | 12 | Peter Byrne (St Bride's) (c) |
| RCF | 13 | Jim Tiernan (Dowdallshill) |
| FF | 14 | Paul Downey (Owen Roe's) |
| LCF | 15 | Jem Moonan (Newtown Blues) |

| GK | 1 | W. Quigley (O'Hanrahans) |
| RCB | 2 | T. Mulhall (O'Hanrahans) |
| FB | 3 | T. Moran (O'Hanrahans) |
| LCB | 4 | P. Brennan (Milford) |
| RHB | 5 | J. Hendrick (Kilbride) |
| CHB | 6 | M. O'Brien (Muinebeag) |
| LHB | 7 | E. Murphy (Muinebeag) |
| MF | 8 | L. O'Keeffe (Leighlinbridge) |
| MF | 9 | J. Lawlor (Army Metro, Dublin) |
| RHF | 10 | M. Price (Milford) |
| CHF | 11 | K. Maher (Muinebeag) |
| LHF | 12 | E. Haughney (O'Hanrahans) |
| RCF | 13 | P. Barron (Muinebeag) |
| FF | 14 | M. Walsh (O'Hanrahans) |
| LCF | 15 | T. Walker (O'Hanrahans) |

=== All-Ireland Junior Football Championship ===
| 14 August 1932 Home Semi-Final | Louth | 5–04 - 1–01 | Cavan | Athletic Grounds, Dundalk |

| 25 September 1932 Home Semi-Final | Roscommon | 3–03 - 2–05 | Cork | Croke Park, Dublin |
| | | | | Referee: S. O'Connor (Dublin) |

| 16 October 1932 Home Final | Louth | 1–12 - 0–04 | Roscommon | Croke Park, Dublin |
| 2pm | | | | Attendance: 15,000 |

| 30 October 1932 Final | Louth | 0-06 – 0-04 | London | Gaelic Grounds, Drogheda |
| | J. Mullen 0-2 (1f), P. Byrne, J. Culligan, P. Downey, J. Tiernan 0-1 each | | C. Carpenter 0-3, M. Lennon 0-1 | Referee: J. Curran (Meath) |

| GK | 1 | Mick Leech (Owen Roe's) |
| RCB | 2 | Pat Dunne (St Mary's) |
| FB | 3 | Willie Crilly (Owen Roe's) |
| LCB | 4 | Tom McArdle (St Magdalene's) |
| RHB | 5 | Vincent Kerr (St Magdalene's) |
| CHB | 6 | Peadar Martin (Owen Roe's) |
| LHB | 7 | Paddy Cluskey (Dromiskin Unknowns) |
| MF | 8 | Paddy Devlin (Kilcurry) |
| MF | 9 | Jim Culligan (Newtown Blues) |
| RHF | 10 | Paddy Moore (St Magdalene's) |
| CHF | 11 | Jimmy Mullen (Owen Roe's) |
| LHF | 12 | Peter Byrne (St Bride's) (c) |
| RCF | 13 | Jim Tiernan (Dowdallshill) |
| FF | 14 | Paul Downey (Owen Roe's) |
| LCF | 15 | Jem Moonan (Newtown Blues) |
Substitutes:
| | 16 | Joe Byrne (St Bride's) for Devlin |

| GK | 1 | Chris Finnegan |
| RCB | 2 | Larry Murphy |
| FB | 3 | M. Fitzpatrick |
| LCB | 4 | James Dillon |
| RHB | 5 | John Fitzpatrick |
| CHB | 6 | Daniel Fitzpatrick (c) |
| LHB | 7 | Joseph Murphy |
| MF | 8 | Patrick Mulpeter |
| MF | 9 | Gerald Murphy |
| RHF | 10 | Harry Murphy |
| CHF | 11 | Daniel O'Loughlin |
| LHF | 12 | James Power |
| RCF | 13 | John McGrath |
| FF | 14 | Chris Carpenter |
| LCF | 15 | Michael Lennon |
