= 1941 All-Ireland Junior Football Championship =

Annual gaelic football tournament

All Ireland Champions
- Winners: Kerry (8th win)
- Captain: Tim Brosnan

All Ireland Runners-up
- Runners-up: Cavan
- Captain: J.F. McGahern

Provincial Champions
- Munster: Kerry
- Leinster: Laois
- Ulster: Cavan
- Connacht: Leitrim

The 1941 All-Ireland Junior Football Championship was the 24th staging of the All-Ireland Junior Championship since its establishment by the Gaelic Athletic Association in 1912.

Roscommon entered the championship as the defending champions, but lost to Leitrim in the opening round of the Connacht Championship.

The All-Ireland final was played on 21 September 1941 at Croke Park between Kerry and Cavan, in what was the first ever meeting of the two counties in the final. Kerry won the match by 0–09 to 0–04 to claim their sixth championship title overall and a first since 1930.

== Results ==
=== Munster Junior Football Championship ===
3 August 1941 Final	Tipperary	0-03 - 1-10	Kerry	Seán Treacy Park, Tipperary
				Referee: P. McKenna (Limerick)

=== Leinster Junior Football Championship ===
13 July 1941 Final	Laois	2-07 - 2-05	Louth	Croke Park, Dublin
	M. Dunne 0-5, V. Scully 1-1, N. Rice 1-0, S. Hughes 0-1		S. Keough 1-1, L. Carr 0-3, Sreenan 1-0, D. Fox 0-1	Referee: P. Dunne (Dublin)

GK	1	John McGlynn (Annanough)
RCB	2	Kevin Croke (Portlaoise)
FB	3	Jimmy Nolan (Portlaoise)
LCB	4	Billy Mullins (Portarlington)
RHB	5	Michael Kaye (Ballyadams)
CHB	6	Paddy Bergin (Clonad)
LHB	7	Mick Shortall (Annanough)
MF	8	Paddy Horan (Mountmellick)
MF	9	John Lalor (Jamestown)
RHF	10	Vinnie Scully (Portlaoise)
CHF	11	Matt Dunne (Annanough)
LHF	12	Austin Stack (Jamestown)
RCF	13	Nicholas Rice (The Heath)
FF	14	Paddy Peacock (Ballyroan)
LCF	15	Stephen Hughes (Jamestown)

GK	1	John Moore (Owen Roes)
RCB	2	Paddy White (Dundalk Young Irelands)
FB	3	Gerry Devine (St Magdalene's)
LCB	4	Peter Killen (Cooley Kickhams)
RHB	5	P.J. Clarke (Dundalk Gaels)
CHB	6	Kevin O'Dowda (St Bride's)
LHB	7	Johnny Murphy (Dowdallshill)
MF	8	Philip Byrne (St Bride's)
MF	9	Michael Campbell (Cooley Kickhams)
RHF	10	Petie McKevitt (Cooley Kickhams)
CHF	11	Seán Keough (Seán O'Mahony's)
LHF	12	Jimmy Sreenan (St Joseph's, Drogheda)
RCF	13	Denis Fox (St Magdalene's)
FF	14	Larry Carr (Ramblers United)
LCF	15	Paddy Carroll (Owen Roes)
Substitutes:
	16	Pat Tuite (Seán O'Mahony's) for Byrne

=== Ulster Junior Football Championship ===
29 June 1941 Final	Cavan	2-07 - 1-08	Armagh	Castleblayney, Monaghan
				Referee: H. McEneaney (Monaghan)

=== Connacht Junior Football Championship ===
3 August 1941 Final	Leitrim	3-09 - 1-07	Galway	Tuam Stadium, Galway
				Referee: M. Jennings (Sligo)

=== All-Ireland semi-finals ===
17 August 1941	Laois	4-06 - 3-09	Kerry	O'Moore Park, Portlaoise
				Referee: C. Nolan (Carlow)

31 August 1941 Replay	Kerry	3-07 - 1-00	Laois	Fitzgerald Stadium, Killarney
				Referee: P. Dunne (Dublin)

24 August 1941	Cavan	1-06 - 1-05	Leitrim	Breffni Park, Cavan
				Referee: P. Ratty (Meath)

=== All-Ireland final ===
21 September 1941	Kerry	0-09 - 0-04	Cavan	Croke Park, Dublin
	T. Long 0-6, P. O'Donoghue, T. Lyne, P. McCarthy 0-1 each		J. Devlin 0-3 (3f), B. Hunt 0-1	Referee: J. Flaherty (Offaly)
