= 1954 All-Ireland Junior Football Championship =

Annual gaelic football tournament

All Ireland Champions
- Winners: Kerry (8th win)
- Captain: John "Walla" O'Connor

All Ireland Runners-up
- Runners-up: London

Provincial Champions
- Munster: Kerry
- Leinster: Dublin
- Ulster: Donegal
- Connacht: Galway

The 1954 All-Ireland Junior Football Championship was the 33rd staging of the All-Ireland Junior Championship since its establishment by the Gaelic Athletic Association in 1912.

Cork entered the championship as the defending champions, but lost to Kerry in the Munster final.

The 1954 All-Ireland final was played on 3 October 1954 at Austin Stack Park in Tralee between Kerry and London, in what was the first ever meeting of the two counties in the final. Kerry won the match by 1–07 to 1-05 to claim their eighth championship title overall and a first in five years.

== Results ==
=== Munster Junior Football Championship ===
11 July 1954 Final	Kerry	1-09 - 2-02	Cork	Fr Breen Park, Kenmare
				Referee: J. Neenan (Limerick)

=== Leinster Junior Football Championship ===
8 August 1954 Final	Louth	0-10 - 0-10	Dublin	Páirc Tailteann, Navan
				Referee: Peter McDermott (Meath)

15 August 1954 Final (Replay)	Dublin	2-11 - 2-04	Louth	Páirc Tailteann, Navan
	E. Crowley 1-2, Brophy 0-5 (2f), P. O'Sullivan 1-0, L. Healy 0-2, J. Young, P. Haughey 0-1 each		O. Flanagan 1-1, A. Morgan 1-0, P. Hand 0-2 (2f), S. Goodman 0-1	Referee: Peter McDermott (Meath)

GK	1	Paddy O'Flaherty (Beann Éadair)
RCB	2	Johnny Bell (O'Dwyer's)
FB	3	Phil Bell (O'Dwyer's)
LCB	4	Tom Ryan (Pioneers)
RHB	5	Harry Boylan (Skerries Harps)
CHB	6	Brendan Houlihan (Erins Isle)
LHB	7	Des Osborne (Erins Isle)
MF	8	Joe Young (St Vincent's)
MF	9	Paddy O'Brien (Erins Isle)
RHF	10	Pádraig Haughey (St Vincent's)
CHF	11	Cecil Cawley (Erins Isle)
LHF	12	Eugene Crowley (Skerries Harps)
RCF	13	Johnny Brophy (St Brigid's)
FF	14	Paddy O'Sullivan (Pioneers)
LCF	15	Liam Healy (St Vincent's)
Substitutes:
	16	Paddy Downey (St Brigid's) for Cawley

GK	1	Eddie Murphy (Clan na Gael)
RCB	2	Amby Morgan (Walshestown Rovers)
FB	3	George Carroll (Oliver Plunketts)
LCB	4	Mick Pentony (Oliver Plunketts)
RHB	5	John McArdle (Clan na Gael)
CHB	6	Paddy Woods (St Colmcille's)
LHB	7	Paddy Dixon (Clan na Gael)
MF	8	Benny Toal (Clan na Gael)
MF	9	Mickey Gartlan (Roche Emmets)
RHF	10	Patsy Coleman (St Mary's)
CHF	11	Pat Hand (Walshestown Rovers) (c)
LHF	12	Seán Goodman (Walshestown Rovers)
RCF	13	Séamus Connolly (Clan na Gael)
FF	14	Jim Rogers (St Colmcille's)
LCF	15	Owen Flanagan (St Magdalene's)
Substitutes:
	16	Paddy Cluskey (St Magdalene's) for Toal
	17	Patsy McDonnell (Sarsfields) for Cluskey
	18	Mick Matthews (Oliver Plunketts) for Goodman

=== Ulster Junior Football Championship ===
30 May 1954 Final	Donegal	1-07 - 0-08	Tyrone	St Molaise Park, Irvinestown
				Referee: P. McCooey (Monaghan)

=== Connacht Junior Football Championship ===
11 July 1954 Final	Roscommon	1-08 - 2-06	Galway	Castlerea
				Referee: T. Byrne (Roscommon)

=== All-Ireland semi-finals ===
22 August 1954 Semi-final	Donegal	3-09 - 1-07	Galway	Ballyshannon Grounds

22 August 1954 Semi-final	Kerry	2-07 - 0-09	Dublin	FitzGerald Stadium

=== All-Ireland home final ===
12 September 1954 Home final	Kerry	3-05 - 1-06	Donegal	Croke Park

=== All-Ireland final ===
3 October 1954 Final	Kerry	1-07 - 1-05	London	Austin Stack Park, Tralee
	E. Fitzgerald 0-4 (2f), J. Culloty 1-0, S. Lovett 0-2, T. Collins 0-1		J. Sugrue 1-0, M. Lowry 0-3 (2f), K. Mulderrig, C. Carroll ('45) 0-1 each	Referee: S. Hayes (Tipperary)
