= Ollie McDonnell =

Irish Gaelic footballer

Personal information
- Born: 17 January 1975
- Height: 5 ft 11 in (180 cm)

Sport
- Sport: Gaelic football
- Position: Full-forward
Club
- Years: Club
- St Joseph's
Inter-county
- Years: County
- Louth

Ollie McDonnell is an Irish Gaelic football manager and former player as a full-forward for St Joseph's and the Louth county team.

He made his senior inter-county debut in 1993 in the National League against Galway away, in Tuam. He continued to play for the Louth U21s as late as 1996. He scored a goal for the Louth senior team in 2002 when they beat the reigning All-Ireland Senior Football Championship winners Armagh in Crossmaglen.

McDonnell managed Louth to the Leinster Junior Football Championship final in 2017.
