= 2006 All-Ireland Junior Football Championship =

Football championship

All Ireland Champions
- Winners: Kerry
- Captain: Seán Hegarty
- Manager: Buddy O'Grady

All Ireland Runners-up
- Runners-up: Roscommon
- Captain: Ronan Cox
- Manager: Eamonn McManus

Provincial Champions
- Munster: Kerry
- Leinster: Meath
- Ulster: Not Played
- Connacht: Roscommon

The 2006 All-Ireland Junior Football Championship was the 76th staging of the competition since its establishment by the Gaelic Athletic Association in 1912.

Traditionally the four provincial championship winners face each other at the All-Ireland semi-final stage.

As the Ulster GAA council did not hold a provincial championship, the fourth semi-final spot was filled by overseas representatives Warwickshire, winners of the 2006 All-Britain Junior Football Championship.

Kerry's victory in the final, against Roscommon on 30 July, was the county's 14th in the history of the All-Ireland Junior Football Championship.

== Results ==
=== Munster Junior Football Championship ===
5 July 2006 Final	Kerry	0-12 - 1-08	Cork	Austin Stack Park, Tralee
				Referee: R. Hickey (Clare)

=== Leinster Junior Football Championship ===
25 June 2006 Final	Meath	1-12 - 0-11	Louth	Croke Park, Dublin
	R. Maguire 0-5 (1f), T. Dowd 1-0, B. Dillon 0-2 (2f), D. Barrett, I. McManus (1f), B. Meade, J. Gallagher, R. Kealy 0-1 each		S. Lennon 0-5 (3f), C. Judge 0-2 (1f), C. McArdle (1f), D. Shevlin, F. McCullough, N. Shevlin 0-1 each	Referee: S. O'Shea (Wexford)

GK	1	John Curry (Ballinabrackey)
RCB	2	Trevor Bannon (Ballinabrackey)
FB	3	Brian O'Reilly (Nobber)
LCB	4	Paddy Nugent (Carnaross) (c)
RHB	5	Barry Kieran (Meath Hill)
CHB	6	Thomas Dillon (Syddan)
LHB	7	John Bruton (Kilbride)
MF	8	Brian Meade (Rathkenny)
MF	9	Jim Gallagher (Gaeil Colmcille)
RHF	10	Richie Kealy (Dunshaughlin)
CHF	11	Stephen Dillon (Syddan)
LHF	12	Tony Cunningham (Duleek)
RCF	13	Rory Maguire (Longwood)
FF	14	Brian Dillon (Syddan)
LCF	15	Trevor Dowd (Dunshaughlin)
Substitutes:
	16	Ian McManus (Curraha) for B. Dillon
	17	Dean Barrett (Na Fianna) for Gallagher
Manager:
Dessie Hamilton

GK	1	Seán Connor (St Patrick's)
RCB	2	Derek Shevlin (Dreadnots)
FB	3	Dessie Finnegan (St Patrick's)
LCB	4	Fergal McGuigan (Dreadnots)
RHB	5	J.J. Quigley (Clan na Gael)
CHB	6	Gavin Long (Cooley Kickhams)
LHB	7	Ronan Greene (Naomh Malachi)
MF	8	Seán O'Neill (Cooley Kickhams)
MF	9	John Doyle (Naomh Fionnbarra)
RHF	10	Francis McCullough (Naomh Máirtín)
CHF	11	David Hughes (Cooley Kickhams)
LHF	12	David Reid (Mattock Rangers)
RCF	13	Cormac McArdle (Dundalk Gaels)
FF	14	Shane Lennon (Kilkerley Emmets)
LCF	15	Colm Judge (Newtown Blues)
Substitutes:
	16	Nicky McDonnell (Naomh Máirtín) for McCullough
	17	Stephen Fitzpatrick (Clan na Gael) for McGuigan
	18	Peter Osborne (Seán McDermott's) for Long
	19	Nigel Shevlin (Dreadnots) for McArdle
	20	David Bracken (Glen Emmets) for Doyle
Manager:
Eamonn McEneaney

=== Connacht Junior Football Championship ===
11 June 2006 Final (After Extra-time)	Roscommon	1-10 - 0-11	Mayo	Ballyhaunis
				Referee: R. McBrien(Leitrim)

=== All-Ireland Semi-Finals ===
8 July 2006	Kerry	0-13 - 0-07	Meath	Dr Cullen Park, Carlow
				Referee: G. McCarron (Monaghan)

14 July 2006	Roscommon	3-19 - 1-08	Warwickshire	Páirc na hÉireann, Birmingham
				Referee: G. Walsh (Antrim)

=== All-Ireland Final ===
30 July 2006	Kerry	1-09 - 0-10	Roscommon	Cusack Park, Ennis
	S. Wallace 1-2, R. McAuliffe 0-4, J. Buckley, M. Murphy, C. Daly 0-1 each		D. Moran (2f), R. O'Connor, M. Connolly, S. Purcell 0-2 each, S. Heneghan, J. Callery 0-1 each	Referee: F. Barrett (Kildare)
