= All-Ireland Junior Football Championship =

Championship competition between Junior Gaelic Football teams

- Current season or competition: 2026 All-Ireland Junior Football Championship
- Irish: Craobh Sóisear Peile na hÉireann
- Code: Gaelic Football
- Founded: 1912
- Region: Ireland (GAA)
- No. of teams: 5 (10 incl. All-Britain)
- Title holders: London (7th title)
- Most titles: Kerry (20 titles)

The All-Ireland Junior Football Championship (JFC) (Irish: Craobh Sóisear Peile na hÉireann) is an inter-county competition in Gaelic football. County teams compete against each other and the winner is declared All-Ireland Junior Champions. Organised by the Gaelic Athletic Association (GAA), the championship has been contested since 1912 under two different formats, while retaining the same name.

The decision was taken at the 1927 GAA Congress to allow county teams under the remit of the British Provincial Council to compete in the All-Ireland Junior Football Championship. In 1928, Ulster GAA did not organise the Ulster Junior Football Championship, and so for the 1928 All-Ireland Junior Football Championship, the winners of the All-Britain Football Championship, London, were chosen to fill in the final semi-final spot. Despite London losing to Kerry by 4-10 to 2-3 at Highgate, the tournament was restructured to incorporate the All-Britain winners. Between 1929 and 1939 (with the exception of 1930, where London entered a preliminary quarter-final) the Irish junior provincial winners would compete in two semi-finals followed by a 'home' final, with the victorious 'home' finalists meeting the champions of Britain in the All-Ireland JFC final. After the Second World War, this structure resumed, and continued until 1974.

No All-Ireland JFCs were held between 1974 and 1982. While the tournament resumed in 1983, the end of the Ulster JFC and temporary end of the Connacht Junior Football Championship in the late 1980s prompted a reshuffle to the tournament's structure, among wider discontentment with football fixture congestion. In 1992, with the return of Connacht, the All-Ireland was played with simple semi-finals and a final between the Leinster, Munster, Connacht, and Britain junior provincial champions.

In Gaelic games, 'junior' is the term used to describe lower tiers behind senior (and where appropriate, intermediate) competition, rather than referring to age-grade as in some sports. Under-17 competitions in Gaelic games are referred to as 'minor' competitions. While the JFC was contested between the 'junior' county teams in Ireland between 1912 and 2021, the definition of what constituted a 'junior' player differed from county to county. In some counties, the junior team was the second team after the senior team and any players who had not played with the senior team could play with the junior team, while in others, such as Cork and Kerry, players could only be chosen from clubs within the county that played in junior or intermediate grades, with these counties unable to choose players from senior clubs even if they had not played for the senior county team. A county that won the JFC in the pre-2021 format had to pick a new team for the following year - no player could be on a winning team for two successive years.

Since 2022, the competition has involved the All-Britain winners and runners-up, alongside Kilkenny, New York, and USGAA. While New York and London compete in the All-Ireland Senior Football Championship/Tailteann Cup structure, the junior teams are made up exclusively of home-grown players. Kilkenny, USGAA, and the other British counties do not field senior teams in the SFC.

With three wins, New York are the most successful team in the post-2021 format. Kerry are the most successful county in the competition's history from the pre-2021 period, having lifted the title on twenty occasions.

== Teams ==
10 teams now compete in the championship:

County	Province	Stadium	Provincial championship	Provincial titles	Last provincial title	Position in 2026 Championship	Championship titles	Last championship title
Gloucestershire	Britain	Pontcanna Fields, Cardiff	All-Britain Football Championship	1	2008	Group stage (All-Britain)	0	N/A
Hertfordshire	Britain	Radlett Road, Watford	All-Britain Football Championship	3	2000	Semi-final (All-Britain)	0	N/A
Kilkenny	Leinster	Nowlan Park, Kilkenny	N/A	3	2018	Quarter-final	1	2022
Lancashire	Britain	Old Bedians, Didsbury	All-Britain Football Championship	12	2016	Group stage (All-Britain)	0	N/A
London	Britain	McGovern Park, Ruislip	All-Britain Football Championship	24	2026	Champion	7	2026
New York	no official province	Gaelic Park, The Bronx	N/A	N/A	N/A	Semi-final	3	2025
Scotland	Britain	Clydebank Sports Hub, Glasgow	All-Britain Football Championship	2	2019	Semi-final (All-Britain)	0	N/A
United States	no official province	N/A	N/A	N/A	N/A	Runner-up	0	N/A
Warwickshire	Britain	Páirc na hÉireann, Solihull	All-Britain Football Championship	16	2023	Semi-final	0	N/A
Yorkshire	Britain	Páirc Beeston, Leeds	All-Britain Football Championship	4	2001	Group stage (All-Britain)	0	N/A

== Roll of Honour ==
=== Wins by county ===
County	Title(s)	Runners-up	Years won	Years runners-up
Kerry	20	5	1913, 1915, 1924, 1928, 1930, 1941, 1949, 1954, 1963, 1967, 1983, 1991, 1994, 2006, 2012, 2015, 2016, 2017, 2018, 2019	1997, 2000, 2002, 2010, 2014
Cork	17	3	1951, 1953, 1955, 1964, 1972, 1984, 1987, 1989, 1990, 1993, 1996, 2001, 2005, 2007, 2009, 2011, 2013	1966, 1986, 1992
London	7	26	1938, 1966, 1969, 1970, 1971, 1986, 2026	1929, 1931, 1932, 1933, 1934, 1935, 1937, 1939, 1947, 1948, 1950, 1952, 1954, 1956, 1959, 1960, 1962, 1964, 1967, 1968, 1973, 1988, 1991, 1995, 2024, 2025
Dublin	6	3	1914, 1916, 1939, 1948, 1960, 2008	1926, 1930, 1971
Mayo	5	7	1933, 1950, 1957, 1995, 1997	1914, 1925, 1936, 2001, 2012, 2015, 2016
Meath	5	4	1947, 1952, 1962, 1988, 2003	1996, 1999, 2005, 2017
Galway	4	4	1931, 1958, 1965, 1985	1994, 2003, 2018, 2019
Louth	4	2	1925, 1932, 1934, 1961	1912, 1928
New York	3	1	2023, 2024, 2025	2022
Tipperary	3	0	1912, 1923, 1998	-
Roscommon	2	3	1940, 2000	2006, 2008, 2009
Wicklow	2	1	1936, 2002	1969
Cavan	2	1	1927, 2014	1941
Waterford	2	0	1999, 2004	-
Sligo	2	0	1935, 2010	-
Westmeath	1	2	1929	1915, 1940
Longford	1	1	1937	1924
Laois	1	1	1973	1993
Wexford	1	1	1992	2007
Kilkenny	1	1	2022	2023
Armagh	1	0	1926	-
Tyrone	1	0	1968	-
Monaghan	1	0	1956	-
Fermanagh	1	0	1959	-
Down	1	0	1946	-
Warwickshire	0	9	-	1946, 1951, 1955, 1957, 1984, 1985, 1987, 1989, 1990
Lancashire	0	4	-	1949, 1953, 1958, 1963
Kildare	0	4	-	1927, 1970, 2011, 2013
Carlow	0	2	-	1913, 1923
Hertfordshire	0	2	-	1965, 1972
Yorkshire	0	2	-	1961, 1983
Leitrim	0	2	-	1938, 2004
Limerick	0	1	-	1916
Offaly	0	1	-	1998
United States	0	1	-	2026

=== Wins by province ===
Province	Title(s)	Runners-up
Munster	42	9
Leinster	22	23
Connacht	13	16
Britain	7	42
Ulster	7	1
North America	3	2

== List of finals ==
=== 1912-2021: 'Junior county team' format ===
Year	Winners	Score		Runners-up
1912	Tipperary	1–04	1–03	Louth
1913	Kerry	0–07	1–02	Carlow
1914	Dublin	5–04	1–06	Mayo
1915	Kerry	0–06	1–02	Westmeath
1916	Dublin	1–02	1–02	Limerick
1916	Dublin	6–04	0–03	Limerick
1917	no championship			
1918	no championship			
1919	no championship			
1920	no championship			
1921	no championship			
1922	no championship			
1923	Tipperary	2–06	1–01	Carlow
1924	Kerry	1–06	0–04	Longford
1925	Louth	2–06	2–05	Mayo
1926	Armagh	4–11	0–04	Dublin
1927	Cavan	0–07	0–03	Kildare
1928	Kerry	2–08	2–03	Louth
1929	Westmeath	0–09	1–02	London
1930	Kerry	2–02	1–04	Dublin
1931	Galway	3–03	1–05	London
1932	Louth	0–06	0–04	London
1933	Mayo	3–07	2–04	London
1934	Louth	1–03	0–03	London
1935	Sligo	5–08	0–03	London
1936	Wicklow	3–03	2–05	Mayo
1937	Longford	0–09	0–07	London
1938	London	5–07	2–09	Leitrim
1939	Dublin	2–14	0–04	London
1940	Roscommon	2–09	0–05	Westmeath
1941	Kerry	0–09	0–04	Cavan
1942	no championship			
1943	no championship			
1944	no championship			
1945	no championship			
1946	Down	2–10	1–09	Warwickshire
1947	Meath	2–11	2–06	London
1948	Dublin	2–11	1–05	London
1949	Kerry	2–14	0–06	Lancashire
1950	Mayo	0-04	0-03	London
1951	Cork	5–11	1–03	Warwickshire
1952	Meath	3–09	0–04	London
1953	Cork	1–11	1–04	Lancashire
1954	Kerry	1–07	1–05	London
1955	Cork	3–09	1–05	Warwickshire
1956	Monaghan	3–07	2–06	London
1957	Mayo	2–07	2–05	Warwickshire
1958	Galway	4–05	3–01	Lancashire
1959	Fermanagh	1–11	2–04	London
1960	Dublin	2–05	0–05	London
1961	Louth	1–13	1–10	Yorkshire
1962	Meath	1–13	3–05	London
1963	Kerry	3–05	2–05	Lancashire
1964	Cork	1–08	2–04	London
1965	Galway	1–08	0–04	Hertfordshire
1966	London	1–06	0–08	Cork
1967	Kerry	0–09	0–04	London
1968	Tyrone	3–08	0–07	London
1969	London	3–09	1–12	Wicklow
1970	London	1–12	0–11	Kildare
1971	London	1–09	0–09	Dublin
1972	Cork	5–16	0–03	Hertfordshire
1973	Laois	0–12	1–08	London
1974	no championship			
1975	no championship			
1976	no championship			
1977	no championship			
1978	no championship			
1979	no championship			
1980	no championship			
1981	no championship			
1982	no championship			
1983	Kerry	0–15	0–02	Yorkshire
1984	Cork	3–10	0–07	Warwickshire
1985	Galway	4–17	0–04	Warwickshire
1986	London	1–09	0–07	Cork
1987	Cork	0–14	0–03	Warwickshire
1988	Meath	1–10	0–03	London
1989	Cork	0–18	0–03	Warwickshire
1990	Cork	3–16	0–08	Warwickshire
1991	Kerry	2–14	0–05	London
1992	Wexford	1–09	0–11	Cork
1993	Cork	0–11	2–03	Laois
1994	Kerry	0–15	0–04	Galway
1995	Mayo	3–09	0–10	London
1996	Cork	4–11	0–10	Meath
1997	Mayo	2–08	1–10	Kerry
1998	Tipperary	2–09	0–06	Offaly
1999	Waterford	2–12	2–11	Meath
2000	Roscommon	0–14	0–11	Kerry
2001	Cork	1–15	3–07	Mayo
2002	Wicklow	4–09	2–12	Kerry
2003	Meath	0–16	2–07	Galway
2004	Waterford	1–10	1–10	Leitrim
2004	Waterford	2–12	2–09	Leitrim
2005	Cork	0–10	1–04	Meath
2006	Kerry	1–09	0–10	Roscommon
2007	Cork	1–14	3–02	Wexford
2008	Dublin	0–13	0–07	Roscommon
2009	Cork	0–15	0–12	Roscommon
2010	Sligo	2–10	1–07	Kerry
2011	Cork	1–12	0–13	Kildare
2012	Kerry	0–19	1–07	Mayo
2013	Cork	0–13	1–07	Kildare
2014	Cavan	2–14	0–14	Kerry
2015	Kerry	2–18	0–10	Mayo
2016	Kerry	2–18	2–11	Mayo
2017	Kerry	2–19	1–14	Meath
2018	Kerry	2–13	2–11	Galway
2019	Kerry	3–14	0–13	Galway

=== 2022-present: New 'overseas-dominant' format ===
Year	Winners	Score		Runners-up	Winning captain
2022	Kilkenny	3-12	1-09	New York	Mick Malone
2023	New York	0-13	1-09	Kilkenny	Danny Corcoran
2024	New York	0-13	0-12	London	Dylan Curran
2025	New York	0-20	2-13	London	Conor Mathers
2026	London	5-12	0-17	United States	Noel Maher

== Records and statistics ==
=== Records by county ===
- Most championships: Kerry (20 times: 1913, 1915, 1924, 1928, 1930, 1941, 1949, 1954, 1963, 1967, 1983, 1991, 1994, 2006, 2012, 2015, 2016, 2017, 2018, 2019)
- Most second-place finishes: London (26 times: 1929, 1931, 1932, 1933, 1934, 1935, 1937, 1939, 1947, 1948, 1950, 1952, 1954, 1956, 1959, 1960, 1962, 1964, 1967, 1968, 1973, 1988, 1991, 1995, 2024, 2025)
- Most semi-final finishes (2022–present): Warwickshire (5 times: 2022, 2023, 2024, 2025, 2026)
- Most quarter-final finishes (2022–present): Kilkenny (2 times: 2024, 2026)
- Counties that have won on every final appearance:
  - 3 times: Tipperary (1912, 1923, 1998)
  - 2 times: Waterford (1999, 2004) and Sligo (1935, 2010)
  - 1 time: Armagh (1926), Tyrone (1968), Monaghan (1956), Fermanagh (1959) and Down (1946)
- Counties that have lost on every final appearance:
  - 9 times: Warwickshire (1946, 1951, 1955, 1957, 1984, 1985, 1987, 1989, 1990)
  - 5 times: Lancashire (1949, 1953, 1958, 1963)
  - 4 times: Kildare (1927, 1970, 2011, 2013)
  - 2 times: Carlow (1913, 1923), Hertfordshire (1965, 1972), Yorkshire (1961, 1983), and Leitrim (1938, 2004)
  - 1 time: Limerick (1916), Offaly (1998), and United States (2026)
- Defending champions retaining their title:
  - Defended once: Cork (1989-1990)
  - Defended twice: London (1969-1971) and New York (2023-2025)
  - Defended four times: Kerry (2015-2019)
- Longest gaps between successive championship titles:
  - 87 years: Cavan (1927–2014)
  - 75 years: Tipperary (1923–1998) and Sligo (1935–2010)
  - 66 years: Wicklow (1936–2002)
  - 60 years: Roscommon (1940–2000)
  - 48 years: Dublin (1960–2008)
  - 40 years: London (1986–2026)
  - 38 years: Mayo (1957–1995)
  - 27 years: Galway (1931–1958) and Louth (1934–1961)
- Most successful team by decade:
  - 1910s: Kerry (913, 1915) and Dublin (1914, 1916)
  - 1920s: Kerry (1924, 1928)
  - 1930s: Louth (1932, 1934)
  - 1940s: Kerry (1941, 1949)
  - 1950s: Cork (1951, 1953, 1955)
  - 1960s: Kerry (1963, 1967) and London (1966, 1969)
  - 1970s: London (1970, 1971)
  - 1980s: Cork (1984, 1987, 1989)
  - 1990s: Cork (1990, 1993, 1996)
  - 2000s: Cork (2001, 2005, 2007, 2009)
  - 2010s: Kerry (2012, 2015, 2016, 2017, 2018, 2019)
  - 2020s: New York (2023, 2024, 2025)

==== Team results (since the 2022 restructure) ====
For each year, the number of teams in each championship (in brackets) are shown:

Team	2022 (9)	2023 (9)	2024 (10)	2025 (10)	2026 (10)
Gloucestershire	B	B	B	B	B
Hertfordshire	B	B	B	B	B
Kilkenny	1st	2nd	QF	SF	QF
Lancashire	B	B	B	B	B
London	SF	SF	2nd	2nd	1st
New York	2nd	1st	1st	1st	SF
Scotland	B	B	B	B	B
United States	—	—	SF	QF	2nd
Warwickshire	SF	SF	SF	SF	SF
Yorkshire	B	B	B	B	B

- 1st – Champions
- 2nd – Runners-up
- SF – Semi-finals
- QF - Quarter-finals
- B – All-Britain

=== Records by province ===
Province	Biggest contributor		Most recent win	
Province	County	No.	County	Year
Munster	Mayo	5	Sligo	2010
Leinster	Dublin	6	Kilkenny	2022
Connacht	Kerry	20	Kerry	2019
Ulster	Cavan	2	Cavan	2014
Britain	London	7	London	2026
North America	New York	3	New York	2025

== See also ==
- All-Ireland Senior Football Championship
- Tailteann Cup
- Connacht Junior Football Championship
- Leinster Junior Football Championship
- Munster Junior Football Championship
- Ulster Junior Football Championship
- All-Britain Football Championship

== Sources ==
- Roll of Honour from RTE website
- Roll of Honour from gaainfo.com
