= 2010 All-Ireland Junior Football Championship =

Asia cup

All Ireland Champions
- Winners: Sligo (2nd win)
- Captain: Jason Farrell
- Manager: Kevin Walsh

All Ireland Runners-up
- Runners-up: Kerry

Provincial Champions
- Munster: Kerry
- Leinster: Louth
- Ulster: Not Played
- Connacht: Sligo

The 2010 All-Ireland Junior Football Championship was the 80th staging of the competition since its establishment by the Gaelic Athletic Association in 1912.

Traditionally, the four provincial championship winners face each other at the All-Ireland semi-final stage.

As the Ulster GAA council did not hold a provincial championship, the fourth semi-final spot was therefore taken by Lancashire, as winners of the 2010 All-Britain Junior Football Championship.

The victory of Sligo, in the final against Kerry, was the county's second in the history of the All-Ireland Junior Football Championship and its first since 1935.

== Results ==
=== Final ===
6 July 2010	Kerry	3-12 - 1-06	Limerick	Newcastle West, County Limerick
	M. O'Donoghue (0-5), G. Sayers (0-4, 1f), B. Poff (1-1), M. Murphy (1-0), A. O'Sullivan (1-0), J. Buckley (0-1), T. McGoldrick (0-1)		R. Lynch (1-2), B. Teahan (0-2f), R. Browne (0-1f), T. Butler (0-1)	Referee: C. McCann (Clare)

=== Final ===
30 June 2010	Louth	0-13 - 2-06	Cavan	Gaelic Grounds, Drogheda
	Stanfield (0-6, 3f), Osborne (0-2), Califf (0-2f), Conlon (0-2), Larkin (0-1)		Brady (2-3), E. Reilly (0-2, 1f), McKiernan (0-1)	Referee: P. Daly (Westmeath)

GK	1	Craig Lynch (Naomh Máirtín)
RCB	2	Podge Bannon (Mattock Rangers)
FB	3	Jamie Faulkner (Dundalk Gaels)
LCB	4	Jamie Carr (Newtown Blues)
RHB	5	Shane Brennan (Seán O'Mahony's)
CHB	6	Colin Goss (St Patrick's)
LHB	7	Liam Shevlin (Dreadnots)
MF	8	Seán O'Neill (Cooley Kickhams) (c)
MF	9	James Califf (Dreadnots)
RHF	10	David Bracken (Glen Emmets)
CHF	11	Paddy O'Boyle (St. Nicholas)
LHF	12	Bernard Osborne (Naomh Fionnbarra)
RCF	13	Niall Conlon (O'Connells)
FF	14	Mark Stanfield (O'Connells)
LCF	15	Mark Larkin (Na Piarsaigh)
Substitutes:
	16	Wayne Reilly (St Mary's) for O'Neill
	17	J.J. Quigley (Clan na Gael) for Brennan
	18	Conor McGuinness (Cooley Kickhams) for Goss
	19	Daniel O'Connell (Roche Emmets) for Bracken

GK	1	Darren Murphy (Drumlane)
RCB	2	Eoin McPhilips (Denn)
FB	3	Eoin Smith (Killygarry)
LCB	4	Mark Johnston (Cornafean)
RHB	5	Niall O'Reilly (Belturbet)
CHB	6	Pauric Cahill (Killygarry)
LHB	7	Kevin Donohoe (Drumalee)
MF	8	Trevor Crowe (Lacken)
MF	9	Adrian Taite (Cúchulainns)
RHF	10	Darren Costello (Denn)
CHF	11	Raymond Galligan (Lacken)
LHF	12	Stephen Jordan (Lavey)
RCF	13	Éamonn Reilly (Shannon Gaels)
FF	14	Declan McKiernan (Killeshandra)
LCF	15	Philip Brady (Mullahoran)
Substitutes:
	16	Niall Smith (Cavan Gaels) for Costello
	17	Paddy Bird (Bailieborough Shamrocks) for Taite
	18	Joey Jordan (Lavey) for Eoin Smith
	19	Barry Reilly (Kingscourt Stars) for Éamonn Reilly

=== Final ===
9 June 2010	Sligo	0-09 - 0-08	Galway	Ballyhaunis, County Mayo
	P. McGoldrick 0-5 (2f, 1'45), D. Maye (0-2, 1f), B. McDonagh (0-2)		E. Poil (0-3, 2f), B. Donnellan (0-2), B.Óg O'Callarain (0-1f), M. Murphy (0-1), C. Coleman (0-1)	Referee: M. Daly (Mayo)

=== All-Ireland Semi-Finals ===
2 August 2010	Sligo	0-13 - 2-06	Louth	Kingspan Breffni Park, Cavan
	D. Maye (0-8, 5f, 2'45), C. Finan (0-2), S. Stenson (0-1), J. Quinn (0-1), M. Gordon (0-1)		M. Stanfield (1-3, 3f), J. Califf (1-0), B. Osbourne (0-2), M. Larkin (0-1)	Referee: D. Brazil (Offaly)

7 August 2010	Kerry	1-17 - 1-08	Lancashire	Old Bedians, Manchester
	A. MacGearailt (0-6, 4f), J. Buckley (1-2), M. Murphy (0-3), E. Hickson (0-2), D. Murphy (0-1), G. Sayers (0-1), A. O'Sullivan (0-1), M. O'Donoghue (0-1)		E Meaney (0-4, 3f), R. Coss (1-0), N. Plant (0-1), S. Molumby (0-1), L. Coyne (0-1), J. Corcoran (0-1)	Referee: G. McCormack (Dublin)

=== All-Ireland Final ===
21 August 2010	Sligo	2-10 - 1-07	Kerry	Pearse Stadium, Galway
	D. Maye (0-8, 6f), C. Finan (1-0), C. McNamara (1-0), P. McGoldrick (0-2)	Report	M. O'Donoghue (0-3, 2f), B. Poff (1-0), A. Fitzgerald (0-2), E. Hickson (0-1), G. Sayers (0-1)	Referee: D. Brazil (Offaly)
