= St Benedicts Harps GAC =

- Founded: 1983
- County: Yorkshire
- Colours: Green and red
- Grounds: Parc An Beeston
{{{kit1}}}

St Benedicts Harps GAA is a Gaelic Athletic Association club in the Leeds area. It was established in 1983 and was reorganized in 1991.
