= 2016 All-Ireland Junior Football Championship =

All Ireland Champions
- Winners: Kerry (17th win)
- Captain: Paul O'Donoghue
- Manager: Stephen Wallace

All Ireland Runners-up
- Runners-up: Mayo
- Captain: Andrew Farrell
- Manager: Seán McLoughlin

Provincial Champions
- Munster: Kerry
- Leinster: Wexford
- Ulster: Not Played
- Connacht: Mayo

The 2016 All-Ireland Junior Football Championship was the 86th staging of the All-Ireland Junior Championship since its establishment by the Gaelic Athletic Association in 1912.

Kerry entered the championship as the defending champions.

The All-Ireland final was played on 6 August 2016 at Croke Park in Dublin, between Kerry and Mayo, in what was their fourth ever meeting in the final and a second successive meeting. Kerry won the match by 2–18 to 2–11 to claim their 17th championship title overall and a second consecutive title.

== Results ==
=== Munster Junior Football Championship ===
29 June 2016 Final	Kerry	0–14 - 0–13	Cork	Austin Stack Park, Tralee
				Referee: D. Grogan (Tipperary)

=== Leinster Junior Football Championship ===
21 June 2016 Final	Wexford	2–12 - 0–09	Louth	St Brigid's Park, Dundalk
	Ryan 2-2, Sinnott 0-6 (2f), Harney 0-3, I. Carty 0-1		Maguire 0-3, Lafferty 0-2 (2f), Carroll, Hand (1f), Corcoran, O'Connell 0-1 each	Referee: P. Maguire (Longford)

GK	1	Philip Murphy (Bannow–Ballymitty)
RCB	2	Páraic O'Keeffe (St Anne's) (c)
FB	3	Jason Barron (St James')
LCB	4	Johnny Connors (Adamstown)
RHB	5	Robbie Vallejo (Geraldine O'Hanrahans)
CHB	6	Shane Doyle (Ballyhogue)
LHB	7	Paul Curtis (Clongeen)
MF	8	Niall Hughes (Kilanerin)
MF	9	Eoin Roche (Sarsfields)
RHF	10	Jake Firman (St Martin's)
CHF	11	Glen Malone (Shelmaliers)
LHF	12	Niall Harney (Bannow–Ballymitty)
RCF	13	Conor Sinnott (St Fintan's)
FF	14	Seán Ryan (Gusserane O'Rahilly's)
LCF	15	Ian Carty (Taghmon–Camross)
Substitutes:
	16	Jamie Carty (St Martin's) for Roche
	17	Tom Byrne (Kilmore) for Hughes
	18	James Stafford (Glynn–Barntown) for Malone
	19	Shane Byrne (Ballyhogue) for I. Carty
	20	Graham Carty (St Mary's, Maudlintown) for Harney
	21	Tony Smith (Shelmaliers) for Sinnott
Manager:
David Power

GK	1	Kevin Brennan (Seán O'Mahony's)
RCB	2	Ciarán Ward (St Colmcille's, Meath)
FB	3	David Finn (Hunterstown Rovers)
LCB	4	Hugh Osborne (Naomh Fionnbarra)
RHB	5	Conall Hoey (Geraldines)
CHB	6	Robbie Curran (Clan na Gael)
LHB	7	Niall Sharkey (Glyde Rangers)
MF	8	Tony McKenna (Hunterstown Rovers)
MF	9	Daniel O'Connell (Roche Emmets)
RHF	10	Darragh Hamill (Geraldines)
CHF	11	Seán Hand (Kilkerley Emmets)
LHF	12	Dean Maguire (Dundalk Young Irelands)
RCF	13	Tadhg McEneaney (Kilkerley Emmets)
FF	14	Darragh Lafferty (St Patrick's)
LCF	15	Cathal Bellew (Kilkerley Emmets)
Substitutes:
	16	Ronan Carroll (St Mary's) for Hamill
	17	Patrick Kirk (St Patrick's) for Curran
	18	Conor Branigan (Newtown Blues) for McEneaney
	19	Matt Corcoran (Geraldines) for McKenna
	20	Ciarán Bellew (Kilkerley Emmets) for Sharkey
	21	John Clutterbuck (Naomh Máirtín) for Hoey
Manager:
Colin Kelly

=== Connacht Junior Football Championship ===
22 May 2016 Final	Mayo	1–11 - 0–12	Galway	Páirc Seán Mac Diarmada, Carrick-on-Shannon
				Referee: B. Judge (Sligo)

=== All-Ireland semifinals ===
23 July 2016	Mayo	2–10 - 0–10	Wexford	O'Connor Park, Tullamore
				Referee: B. Tiernan (Dublin)

23 July 2016	Kerry	4–17 - 3–10	Lancashire	Old Bedians, Manchester
				Referee: N. McKenna (Monaghan)

=== All-Ireland Final ===
6 August 2016	Kerry	2–18 - 2–11	Mayo	Croke Park, Dublin
	N. O'Shea 2-0, M.S. Ó'Conchúir 0-5 (2f), K. Hurley, D. Foran, P. O'Donoghue (1'45)(1f) 0-3 each, J. Foley, A. Barry, A. Spillane, D. Roche 0-1 each		D. Coen 0-5 (4f), C. Keane 0-4, M. Forde 1-1, R. Holian 1-0, J. Kelly 0-1	Referee: S. McLaughlin (Donegal)
