= 1997 All-Ireland Junior Football Championship =

Gaelic football tournament held in 1996

All Ireland Champions
- Winners: Mayo
- Captain: Vinny Keane
- Manager: Billy Fitzpatrick

All Ireland Runners-up
- Runners-up: Kerry
- Captain: Diarmuid Murphy
- Manager: Buddy O'Grady

Provincial Champions
- Munster: Kerry
- Leinster: Meath
- Ulster: Not Played
- Connacht: Mayo

The 1997 All-Ireland Junior Football Championship was the 67th staging of the All-Ireland Junior Championship, the Gaelic Athletic Association's second tier Gaelic football championship.

Cork entered the championship as the defending champions, but lost to Clare at the semi-final stage of the Munster Championship.

The 1997 All-Ireland Junior Championship final was played on 23 August 1997 in Ennis, between Mayo and Kerry.

Mayo won the match by 2–08 to 1–10 to claim their fifth championship overall and a second in three years.

== Results ==
=== Munster Junior Football Championship ===
| 16 July 1997 Final | Kerry | 1-15 - 0-09 | Clare | Austin Stack Park, Tralee |
| | | | | Referee: W. O'Mahony (Limerick) |

=== Leinster Junior Football Championship ===
| 20 July 1997 Final | Meath | 0-16 - 1-08 | Louth | Croke Park, Dublin |
| | J. Henry, D. White, R. Kealy, F. O'Callaghan (3f) 0-3 each, D. Doonan 0-2, M. Crampton, T. Hanley 0-1 each | | P. O'Kane 0-5 (2f), D. Reilly 1-1 (1f), P. McGuigan, P. Kelly 0-1 each | Referee: N. Cooney (Offaly) |

| GK | 1 | John Curry (Ballinabrackey) |
| RCB | 2 | Diarmuid Kealy (Dunshaughlin) |
| FB | 3 | Conor Woods (Carnaross) |
| LCB | 4 | Alan Meade (Simonstown Gaels) |
| RHB | 5 | Stephen Murphy (Duleek) |
| CHB | 6 | Cormac Murphy (St Patrick's) |
| LHB | 7 | Tommy Hanley (Athboy) |
| MF | 8 | Karl McDonnell (Duleek) |
| MF | 9 | John Henry (Cortown) (c) |
| RHF | 10 | Derek Doonan (Navan O'Mahonys) |
| CHF | 11 | Richie Kealy (Dunshaughlin) |
| LHF | 12 | Mark Crampton (Blackhall Gaels) |
| RCF | 13 | Daithí White (St Patrick's) |
| FF | 14 | Shay Duff (Syddan) |
| LCF | 15 | Francis Callaghan (Meath Hill) |
Substitutes:
| | 16 | Eugene Greville (Enfield) for C. Murphy |
| | 17 | James Mitchell (Longwood) for Crampton |
| | 18 | Timmy O'Regan (Donaghmore/Ashbourne) for Callaghan |
Manager:
Eamonn Barry

| GK | 1 | Séamus Quigley (Kilkerley Emmets) |
| RCB | 2 | Breen Phillips (Newtown Blues) |
| FB | 3 | Brian Keenan (St Mary's |
| LCB | 4 | Gerry Craven (Roche Emmets) |
| RHB | 5 | Paddy McGuigan (Dreadnots) |
| CHB | 6 | Niall Flynn (Glyde Rangers) |
| LHB | 7 | Mark Devlin (Naomh Fionnbarra) |
| MF | 8 | James McDonnell (Naomh Máirtín) (c) |
| MF | 9 | Damien Martin (Newtown Blues) |
| RHF | 10 | Peter O'Kane (Dundalk Gaels) |
| CHF | 11 | Paul Kelly (Newtown Blues) |
| LHF | 12 | Turlough Lennon (Kilkerley Emmets) |
| RCF | 13 | David Reilly (St Joseph's) |
| FF | 14 | Aidan Shevlin (Stabannon Parnells) |
| LCF | 15 | Mark Leavy (Dundalk Young Irelands) |
Substitutes:
| | 16 | Wayne Carroll (Lann Léire) for Lennon |
| | 17 | Adrian O'Sullivan (St Joseph's) for Martin |
| | 18 | Aidan Delaney (Dundalk Gaels) for Flynn |
Manager:
Paul Kenny

=== Connacht Junior Football Championship ===
| 2 June 1997 Final | Mayo | 1-15 - 0-08 | Roscommon | McHale Park, Castlebar |
| | | | | Referee: E. Watters (Sligo) |

=== All-Ireland semi-finals ===
| 27 July 1997 | Warwickshire | 0-08 - 4-10 | Mayo | Páirc na hÉireann, Birmingham |

| 6 August 1997 | Kerry | 0-12 - 1-08 | Meath | MacDonagh Park, Nenagh |
| | | | | Referee: D. Joyce (Galway) |

=== All-Ireland final ===
| 23 August 1997 | Kerry | 1-10 - 2-08 | Mayo | Cusack Park, Ennis |
| | O. Walshe 1-1, T. Morley 1-0, B. Fitzpatrick, J. Commins, K. Comer 0-2 each, J. Hession 0-1 | | P. O'Donoghue 0-6 (3f), E. Fitzmaurice 1-1, L. Brosnan 0-2, D. Dennehy 0-1 | Referee: M. McBrien (Fermanagh) |
