= Yorkshire GAA =

Gaelic games governing body in England

- Irish: Sír Eabhrac
- Founded: 1948; 78 years ago
- Province: Britain
- Ground(s): Páirc Beeston, Beeston
- County colours: Blue White

County teams
- Football Championship: All-Ireland Junior Football Championship

County colours

A Yorkshire GAA flag design

The Yorkshire County Board of the Gaelic Athletic Association (GAA), known as Yorkshire GAA, is one of the county boards of the GAA outside Ireland, and is responsible for Gaelic games in Yorkshire and North East England. The county board is also responsible for the Yorkshire county teams. With Hertfordshire, Gloucestershire, Lancashire, London, Scotland, and Warwickshire, the board makes up the British Provincial Board.

== History ==
Gaelic games have been played in Yorkshire as early as the 1940s, with clubs being established by Irish immigrants travelling to Britain to find work. The Yorkshire County Board was established in 1948, with several clubs being formed in Leeds around the same time.

In 1987, Mayo and Dublin played a football challenge match at Elland Road in front of a crowd of 5000 spectators, with a second Elland Road match being played in 1988 between Mayo and Galway.

The ladies’ football scene in Yorkshire officially began in 1988 with the formation of the Pennine League between clubs in Lancashire and Yorkshire. A Pennine county team was formed in the same year, and in 1989, Pennine and London became the founding members of Britain LGFA. While Lancashire would become its own county board in the 1990s, Yorkshire LGFA was founded in 2018, with the ladies’ county team winning the LGFA Championship in the same year. The Pennine League continues to be played between the Lancashire and Yorkshire ladies’ clubs, with separate county championships also existing in the two counties.

== Football ==
=== Clubs ===
Club name	Teams	Location	Pitch
Brothers Pearse	Men's - Senior Ladies' - Junior	Huddersfield	New Hey Road
Cú Chulainns / Tír na nÓg	Men's - Senior (Cú Chulainns) Ladies' - Junior (Tír na nÓg)	Newcastle	Killingworth
Hugh O'Neills	Men's - Senior Ladies' - Junior	Leeds	Pairc Beeston
John F Kennedys	Men's - Senior	Leeds	Pairc Beeston
St Benedicts Harps	Men's - Senior	Leeds	Pairc Beeston
St Vincents	Men's - Senior Ladies' - Junior	Sheffield	Norton Sports Park
York Irish	Training	York	

=== Yorkshire Men's Senior Football Championship winners ===
- 2015 Hugh O'Neils
- 2016 St Benedicts Harps
- 2017 Hugh O'Neills
- 2018 Cu Chulainns
- 2019 Hugh O'Neills
- 2020 Hugh O'Neills
- 2021 St Vincents
- 2022 Brothers Pearse
- 2023 Hugh O'Neills
- 2024 Hugh O'Neills
- 2025 Hugh O'Neills
- 2026 St Vincents

=== Yorkshire Ladies' Junior Football Championship winners ===
- 2018 Tír na nÓg
- 2019 Tír na nÓg
- 2020 not played
- 2021 Tír na nÓg
- 2022 Hugh O'Neills
- 2023 Brothers Pearse
- 2024 Hugh O'Neills
- 2025 Hugh O'Neills
- 2026 St Vincents

=== County team ===
Yorkshire fields a men's county team in the All-Britain Football Championship and a ladies' county team in the Britain LGFA Junior Championship. The Yorkshire men have not won the All-Britain since the tournament was restructured in 2022, and so have not yet competed in the new format of the All-Ireland Junior Football Championship.

==== Honours ====
- Men's
  - All-Ireland Junior Football Championship
    - (silver) Runners-Up (2): 1961, 1983
  - All-Britain Football Championship
    - (gold) Winners (4): 1961, 1983, 1996, 2001
- Ladies'
  - All-Britain Ladies' Football Championship
    - (gold) Winners: 2018

== Hurling and camogie ==
=== Clubs ===
As Yorkshire's sole hurling team, Yorkshire Emeralds currently compete in the Lancashire county championship system. There are no active camogie teams within Yorkshire.

Club name	Teams	Location	Pitch
Yorkshire Emeralds	Hurling	Leeds	Pairc Beeston

==== Honours ====
Yorkshire Emeralds

- Lancashire SHC: (silver) Runners-Up (2): 2025, 2026

=== County team ===
Yorkshire has never competed in the All-Ireland Senior Hurling Championship.
