= Pontcanna Fields & Llandaff Fields =

Park in Cardiff, Wales

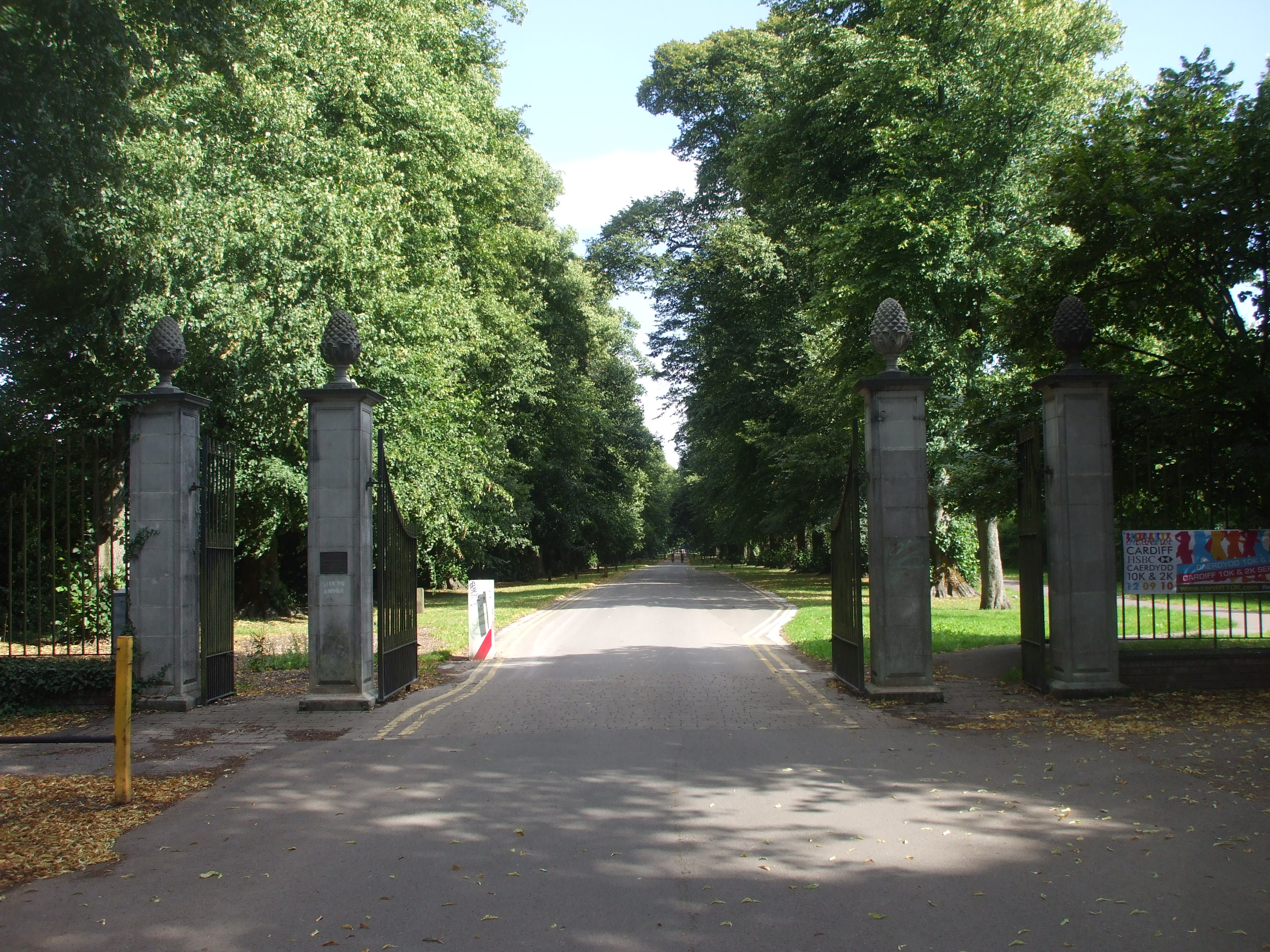
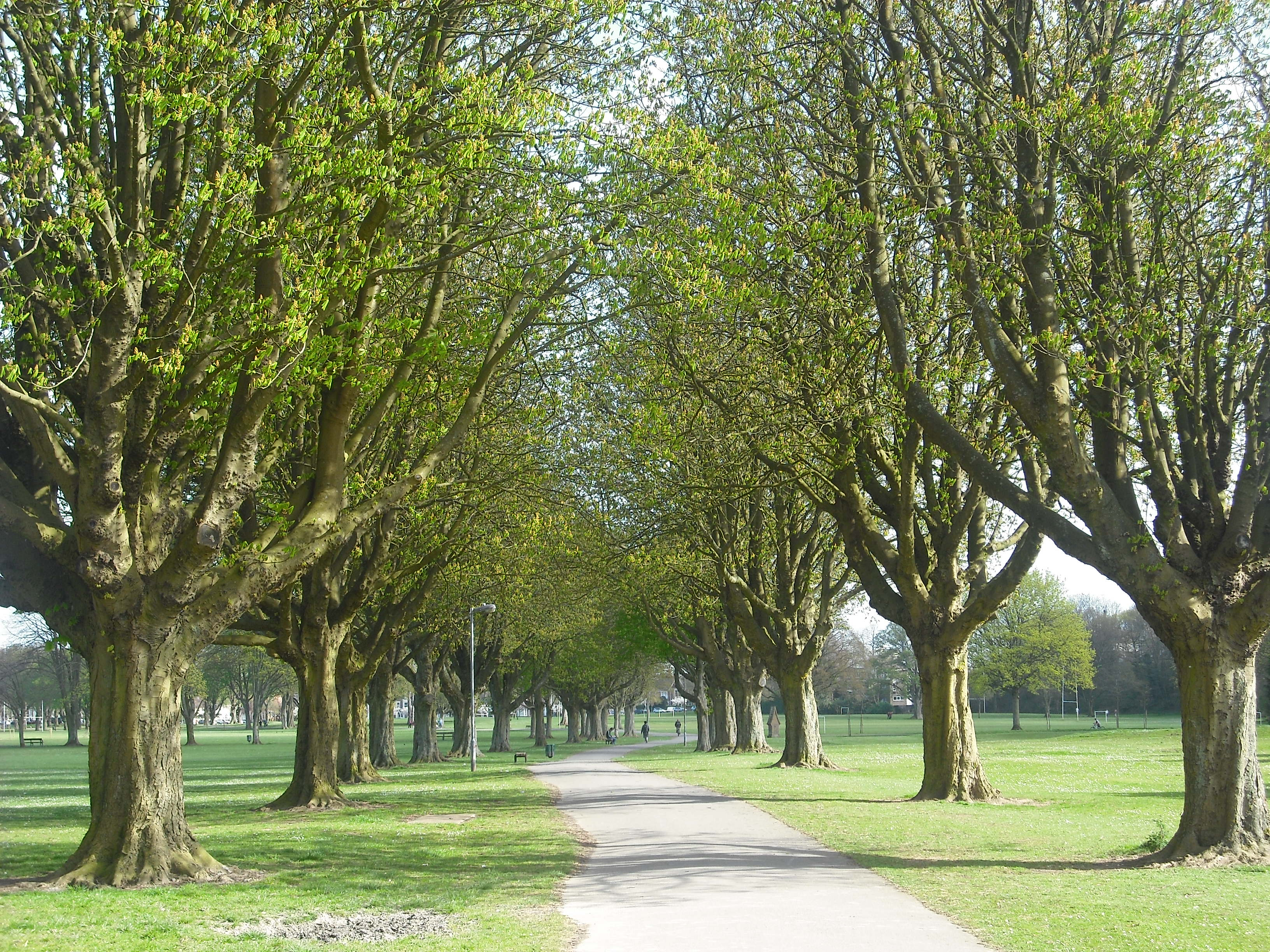
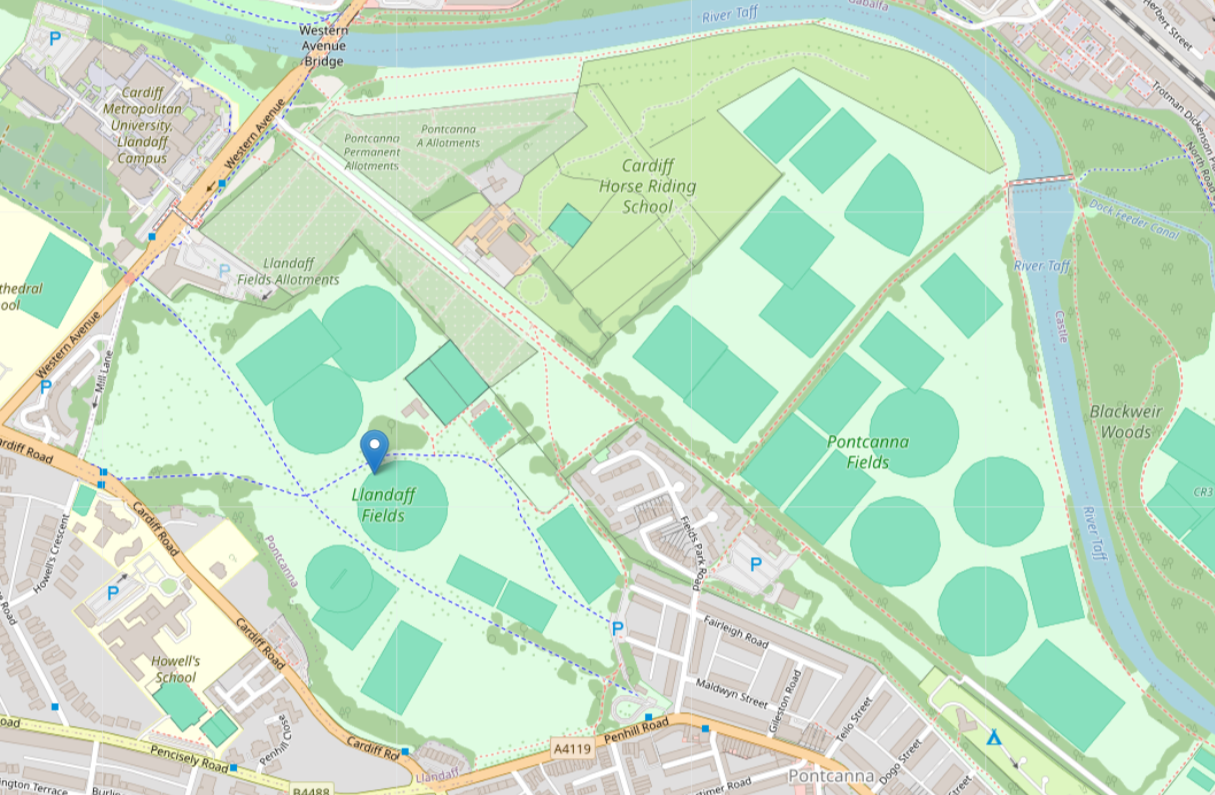
- Gateway to Pontcanna Fields Llandaff Fields Map of Llandaff Fields (left) and Pontcanna Fields (right)
- Location: Cardiff, Wales
- Coordinates: 51°29′26″N 3°12′27″W
- Owner: County Council of the City and County of Cardiff

Cadw/ICOMOS Register of Parks and Gardens of Special Historic Interest in Wales
- Official name: Pontcanna Fields and Llandaff Fields
- Designated: 1 February 2022; 3 years ago
- Reference no.: PGW(Gm)59(CDF)
- Listing: Grade II*

Pontcanna Fields & Llandaff Fields are two urban green spaces that adjoin each other in Cardiff, Wales, covering 157 acres (64 ha) and 70 acres (28 ha) respectively. They are situated on the western banks of the River Taff and to the east of Llandaff and northeast of Pontcanna. Both parks are owned by Cardiff Council and managed by its Parks department. The parks are mostly on flat ground as they form part of the floodplain of the River Taff, although the ground does rise on the western edge of Llandaff Fields. To the south of Pontcanna Fields lies Sophia Gardens and the Sophia Gardens cricket ground. The parkland is lined with avenues of trees and large grassed areas. The park is also used for sporting events.

== History ==
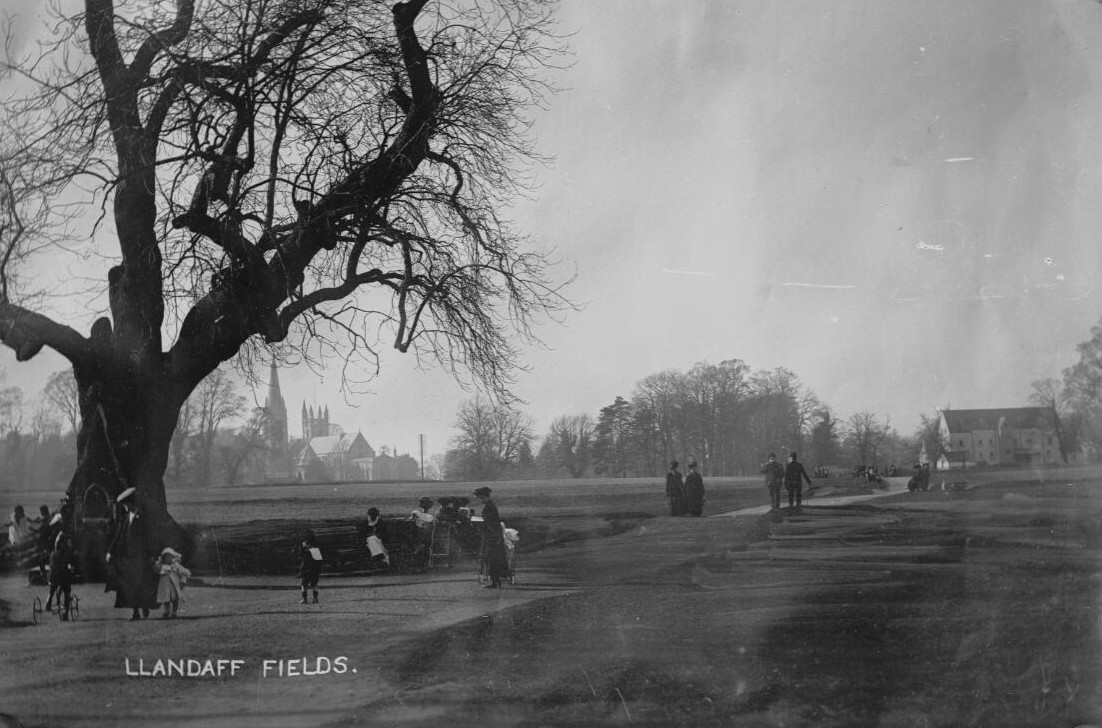
Llandaff Fields, circa 1905

Llandaff Fields were purchased for Cardiff Council from the mill-owning Thompson Family in 1898. The park is located on a historically important route between the city centre and Llandaff.

In 1860, an extension of the park northwards for athletic purposes was announced, and took place in 1879, merging with Pontcanna Fields. Development of the park took place between 1899 and 1901. Three cricket pitches, a hockey pitch and a tennis court were added. Plans were submitted for a swimming pool, which closed early 1990s. Features such as a fountain pool, rockery and fern dell were mentioned in the 70-acre (280,000 m^{2}) area in a gardening magazine in 1923, but have since gone. 40 acres (160,000 m^{2}) of the fields were used for allotments during the war.

The 2008 National Eisteddfod was held on Llandaff Fields, the consequence of which was still a problem in April 2010 after a part of the fields remained waterlogged. Cardiff Council has since announced £400,000 redevelopment plans for the pitches with under-soil drains.

In July 2010 Cardiff Council rejected an application for a car park outside the University of Wales Institute, Cardiff, citing that it would harm the character and appearance of the Llandaff Conservation Area, result in the loss of open space in the city, and worsen traffic congestion on Western Avenue.

== Landscape ==
The park is made up of a mixture of vast mown grass land and woodland areas home to wildlife. The park is situated in the valley of the River Taff. Mature trees are frequent throughout the park, such as the Horse Chestnut and Lime trees

The park is an area of mown grass crossed by a network of tarmac walks, bounded by roads on all sides but the east, where most recreational facilities are found.

=== Location ===
The fields, together with the adjacent Pontcanna Fields, form a large wedge of open space, situated on the west bank of the River Taff, stretching from the city centre out to the west of Llandaff. Sophia Gardens lies just to the south of the area and Bute Park is located on the other side of the river.

Access by foot to the park is from the surrounding streets in the respective communities. The Taff Trail cycle route runs through the nearby Pontcanna Fields, just to the north of Llandaff Fields. Bus services run along Cathedral Road and Cardiff Road, to the south and east of the park.

WJEC's headquarters and the University of Wales Institute Cardiff's Llandaff campus are located just beyond the northern boundary of the fields.

=== Facilities ===
The park has sport pitches designed for many different sports, as well as tennis courts and bowls facilities, and a playground. Llandaff Fields Tennis Club is based in the park. Changing rooms, toilets and parking are provided at Llandaff Fields.
