= Ulster Junior Football Championship =

The Ulster Junior Football Championship is a junior Gaelic football knockout competition organised by the Ulster GAA. The competition began in 1914, with Cavan winning during the inaugural title. The most successful county to date is Cavan, who have won on fourteen occasions. The championship was last played in 2023 with the team from Arva Cavan emerging victorious. A number of counties such as Cavan and Fermanagh have participated in the Leinster and Connacht championships in recent years.

The winners of the Ulster Junior Football Championship each year progressed to play the other provincial champions for a chance to win the All-Ireland Junior Football Championship.

== Roll of honour ==
#	County	Titles	Years won
1	Cavan	14	1914, 1915, 1916, 1924, 1927, 1932, 1936, 1938, 1940, 1941, 1944, 1957, 1962, 1984
2	Down	9	1931, 1934, 1946, 1947, 1949, 1958, 1965, 1966, 1971
3	Derry	7	1945, 1950, 1953, 1955, 1964, 1967, 1969
3	Antrim	7	1923, 1937, 1942, 1960, 1963, 1970, 1972
3	Armagh	7	1925, 1926, 1929, 1935, 1948, 1951, 1985
6	Donegal	5	1930, 1933, 1939, 1952, 1954
7	Tyrone	3	1968, 1983, 1986
8	Fermanagh	2	1943, 1959
8	Monaghan	2	1956, 1961

== List of finals ==
Year	Winners	Score	Runners-up	Score
1987-	No championship			
1986	Tyrone	1–07	Monaghan	0–04
1985	Armagh	2–09	Donegal	0–12
1984	Cavan	2–07	Monaghan	0–10
1983	Tyrone	5–07	Monaghan	1–08
1973–82	Suspended			
1972	Antrim	3–08	Monaghan	1–06
1971	Down	3–10	Fermanagh	1–01
1970	Antrim	3–08	Donegal	3–05
1969	Derry	3–09	Down	2–05
1968	Tyrone	2–06	Armagh	0–03
1967	Derry	2–08	Cavan	0–04
1966	Down	2–06	Monaghan	0–08
1965	Down	3–08	Derry	2–08
1964	Derry	2–13	Antrim	0–08
1963	Antrim	5–08	Donegal	1–03
1962	Cavan	0–08	Down	0–07
1961	Monaghan	2–08	Antrim	1–06
1960	Antrim	1–07	Derry	1–06
1959	Fermanagh	2–13	Antrim	1–04
1958	Down	0–10	Antrim	1–05
1957	Cavan	3–06	Donegal	2–02
1956	Monaghan	0–10	Cavan	0–02
1955	Derry	0–13	Down	0–06
1954	Donegal	1–07	Tyrone	0–08
1953	Derry	3–06	Cavan	1–05
1952	Donegal	4–05	Tyrone	1–08
1951	Armagh	3–06	Down	1–06
1950	Derry	2–07	Antrim	1–04
1949	Down	2–04	Fermanagh	1–03
1948	Armagh	1–12	Antrim	3–02
1947	Down	5–04	Derry	0–07
1946	Down	2–05	Donegal	0–07
1945	Derry	4–02	Armagh	0–06
1944	Cavan	0–10	Donegal	0–05
1943	Fermanagh	3–08	Antrim	2–06
1942	Antrim	3–10	Fermanagh	1–06
1941	Cavan	2–07	Armagh	1–08
1940	Cavan	3–05	Antrim	1–08
1939	Donegal	2–08	Cavan	3–04
1938	Cavan	2–03	Armagh	2–01
1937	Antrim	2–06	Tyrone	1–06
1936	Cavan	4–07	Down	4–02
1935	Armagh	3–06	Derry	3–02
1934	Down	1–04, 4–06 (R)*	Donegal	0–09, 3–05 (R)
1933	Donegal	3–07	Derry	1–03
1932	Cavan	2–05	Down	1–01
1931	Down	1–03	Cavan	0–05
1930	Donegal	w/o	Cavan	
1929	Armagh	3–14	Derry	1–02
1928	No championship			
1927	Cavan	4–08	Armagh	1–02
1926	Armagh	0–03	Tyrone	0–02
1925	Armagh	2–03	Cavan	2–01
1924	Cavan	3–07	Antrim	2–00
1923	Antrim	1–03	Cavan	1–02
1917–22	No championship			
1916	Cavan	0–07	Monaghan	0–00
1915	Cavan	2–03	Antrim	1–01
1914	Cavan	beat	Antrim	

- 1934 Replay ordered after an objection

== See also ==
- Munster Junior Football Championship
- Leinster Junior Football Championship
- Connacht Junior Football Championship
