= 1912 All-Ireland Junior Football Championship =

All Ireland Champions
- Winners: Tipperary (1st win)
- Captain: Edward O'Shea

All Ireland Runners-up
- Runners-up: Louth
- Captain: Tom Burke

Provincial Champions
- Munster: Tipperary
- Leinster: Louth
- Ulster: Not Played
- Connacht: Not Played

The 1912 All-Ireland Junior Football Championship was the first staging of the All-Ireland Junior Championship, the Gaelic Athletic Association's second tier Gaelic football championship.

The All-Ireland final was played on 23 February 1913 at Jones's Road in Dublin, between Tipperary and Louth, in what was their first ever championship meeting. Tipperary recovered from a half-time deficit of five points to win the match by 1–04 to 1–03 and claim their first championship title.

== Results ==
=== All-Ireland Junior Football Championship ===
==== Leinster final ====
27 October 1912	Louth	3-01 - 2-02	Carlow	Jones's Road
	Harlin, Heaney, Mulholland (1-0 each), T. Burke (0-1)			Referee: M.F. Crowe (Dublin)

1	Michael Carolan (Funshog) (gk)
2	John J. Kirwan (Geraldines)
3	James McCann (Ardee St Mochta's)
4	Stephen Reilly (Ardee St Mochta's)
5	Pat Kirk (Dundalk Rangers)
6	Bernard Lennon (Dundalk Young Irelands)
7	Edward McCormack (Drogheda Stars)
8	Pat McGough (Dundalk Rangers)
9	Joe Burke (Dundalk Rangers)
10	Pete Mulholland (Dundalk Rangers)
11	Tom Kelly (Boyne Rovers)
12	Pete McLoughlin (Ardee St Mochta's)
13	Jack Heaney (Ardee St Mochta's)
14	Pat Harlin (Ardee St Mochta's)
15	Tom Burke (Drogheda Stars) (c)
16	Pat McCann (Drogheda Stars)
17	Willie Wylie (Dundalk Young Irelands)

1	P. May (gk)
2	J. Millet
3	W. Kennedy
4	M. Leo
5	W. Quinn
6	M. Coady
7	J. Redmonds
8	J. Murphy
9	A. Murphy
10	W. Murphy
11	P. Haughney
12	C. Haughney
13	M. Hogan
14	W. Cooney
15	M. Lawler
16	W. Mulhall
17	L. Shaw

==== Munster final ====
Tipperary	0-05 - 0-02	Cork

==== All-Ireland final ====
23 February 1913 Final	Tipperary	1-04 - 1-03	Louth	Jones's Road
	J.J Quinn 1-2, J. O'Shea, P. O'Dwyer 0-1 each		W. Wylie 1-0, P. Kirk, P. McGeough, P Mulholland 0-1 each	Referee: Tom Irwin (Cork)

1	L. Gorman (Fethard) (gk)
2	T. O'Connor (Cashel King Cormacs)
3	E. O'Shea (Fethard) (c)
4	F. O'Brien (Mullinahone)
5	E. Delahunty (Fethard)
6	E. Egan (Mullinahone)
7	J. Shelly (Grangemockler)
8	M. Devitt (Cashel King Cormacs)
9	W. Scully (Grangemockler)
10	P. Egan (Mullinahone)
11	P. O'Dwyer (Tipperary O'Leary's)
12	H. Kennedy (Galtee Rovers)
13	D. Stapleton (Clonmel Shamrocks)
14	J.J. Quinn (Galtee Rovers)
15	R. Heffernan (Clonmel Shamrocks)
16	N. Vaughan (Mullinahone)
17	J. O'Shea (Fethard)

1	Michael Carolan (Funshog) (gk)
2	Michael Tenanty (Drogheda Stars)
3	James McCann (Ardee St Mochta's)
4	Stephen Reilly (Ardee St Mochta's)
5	Pat Kirk (Dundalk Rangers)
6	John Norton (Dundalk Rangers)
7	Edward McCormack (Drogheda Stars)
8	Pete McLoughlin (Ardee St Mochta's)
9	Pete Mulholland (Dundalk Rangers)
10	Pat McGeough (Dundalk Rangers)
11	George Matthews (Drogheda Stars)
12	Tom Burke (Drogheda Stars) (c)
13	Joe Burke (Dundalk Rangers)
14	Willie Wylie (Dundalk Young Irelands)
15	Tom Harlin (Ardee St Mochta's)
16	Jack Heaney (Ardee St Mochta's)
17	Bernard Lennon (Dundalk Young Irelands)
Substitute:
18	Pat Collins (Dundalk Young Irelands) for J. Burke
