= 2026 All-Ireland Minor Football Championship =

Gaelic football competition

All-Ireland Minor Football Championship 2026
Championship details
- Dates: 20 March – 5 July 2026
- Teams: 32

All-Ireland Champions
- Winning team: Cork (12th win)
- Captain: Joe Miskella
- Manager: Keith Ricken

All-Ireland Finalists
- Losing team: Tyrone
- Captain: Ciaran McCrystal; Charlie Meenan (On-Field)
- Manager: Gerard Donnelly

Provincial Champions
- Munster: Cork
- Leinster: Kildare
- Ulster: Tyrone
- Connacht: Roscommon

Championship statistics
- Top Scorer: Jack Reilly (3–33)

The 2026 All-Ireland Minor Football Championship is the 95th staging of the All-Ireland Minor Football Championship since its establishment by the Gaelic Athletic Association in 1929. The championship ran from 20 March to 5 July 2026.

Tyrone were the defending champions.

The All-Ireland final was played on 5 July 2026 at Cedral St Conleth's Park in Newbridge, between Cork and Tyrone, in what was their third meeting in the final overall and a first meeting in the final in 16 years. Cork won the match by 2–16 to 1–16 to claim their 12th championship title overall and a first title in seven years.

Kildare's Jack Reilly was the championship's top scorer with 3–33.

== Connacht Minor Football Championship ==
=== Connacht Group Stage ===
Pos	Team	Pld	W	D	L	SF	SA	Diff	Pts	Qualification
1	Roscommon	4	4	0	0	68	38	+30	8	Advance to Final
2	Galway	4	3	0	1	68	56	+12	6	Advance to Semi-Final
3	Sligo	4	2	0	2	66	53	+13	4	Advance to Semi-Final
4	Mayo	4	1	0	3	56	65	-9	2	
5	Leitrim	4	0	0	4	42	88	-46	0	

==== Connacht group stage matches ====
20 March 2026 Round 1	Sligo	1-11 (14) – (15) 1-12	Roscommon	Tubbercurry
17:00				Venue: Kilcoyne Park
	Pts: O Gormley1-3, D Feeney 0-5, S Óg McDonagh 0-1, A Hannon 0-1, R Healy 0-1.	Report	Pts: R O'Dowd 1-1, J Coyne 0-4, E Browne 0-2, S Carthy 0-2, J Brooks 0-1, B Lenehan 0-1, C Nerney 0-1.

20 March 2026 Round 1	Galway	2-18 (24) – (12) 1-09	Leitrim	Tuam
17:00				Venue: Tuam Stadium
	Pts: M Mitchell 1-1, A Hanrahan 1-1, A Healy 0-4, O Ó Neachtáin 0-4, S Heneghan 0-3, J Cullinane 0-2, E Gannon 0-1, D Kelly 0-1, E Maher 0-1.	Report	Pts: H McGovern 1-1, J Bosquette 0-3, S Kelly 0-2, S Keaney 0-2, C McLaughlin 0-1.

27 March 2026 Round 2	Roscommon	0-14 (14) – (9) 1-06	Galway	Roscommon
17:30				Venue: King & Moffatt Dr Hyde Park
	Pts: J Coyne 0-6, C Nerney 0-2, B Lenehan 0-2, S Carthy 0-2, E Browne 0-1, J Jennings 0-1.	Report	Pts: M Mitchell 1-0, R Connolly 0-2, O Ó Neachtáin 0-2, A Healy 0-2.

27 March 2026 Round 2	Leitrim	2-11 (17) – (20) 1-17	Mayo	Carrick-on-Shannon
17:30				Venue: Heartland Credit Union Páirc Seán MacDiarmada
	Pts: S Keaney 1-4, 1f,1tp; M Speers 1-3, 1tp; J Bosquette 0-2,1f; S Kelly 0-2, 1f	Report	Pts: E Heneghan 1-4; C Hoban (tp) & N Dooley 0-3 each; F Ó Cinnseala 0-2; R McLoughlin (45), T Kearney, D Connor, J Jennings & C Fallon 0-1 each

3 April 2026 Round 3	Galway	0-19 (19) – (15) 1-12	Sligo	Tuam
18:30				Venue: Tuam Stadium
	Pts: E Burke 0-5, A Healy 0-3, K Moran 0-2, S Heneghan 0-2, E Maher 0-2, R Connolly 0-1, O Ó Neachtáin 0-1, D Kelly 0-1, J Cullinane 0-1, A Hanrahan 0-1.	Report Report]	Pts: R Lang 1-7, R Healy 0-2, J Kelly 0-2, A Hannon 0-1.

3 April 2026 Round 3	Mayo	0-13 (13) – (23) 2-17	Roscommon	Castlebar
19:00				Venue: Hastings Insurance MacHale Park
	Pts: F Ó Cinnseala 0-4, C Hoban 0-4, C Fallon 0-2, A Brogan 0-1, A Smyth 0-1, A Burton 0-1.	Report	Pts: C Nerney 2-0, S Carthy 0-6, J Jennings 0-4, J Coyne 0-3, E Browne 0-2, J Brooks 0-1, J Concannon 0-1.

10 April 2026 Round 4	Roscommon	1-13 (16) – (2) 0-02	Leitrim	Roscommon
18:30				Venue: King & Moffatt Dr Hyde Park
	Pts: S Duggan 0-7, 2 tp; C Cryan 1-1; C McLoughlin 0-2; C McGowan, J O’Brien & D Goode 0-1 each.	Report	Pts: S Kelly (f) & H McGovern 0-1 each

10 April 2026 Round 4	Sligo	0-09 (9) – (8) 0-08	Mayo	Tubbercurry
18:30				Venue: Kilcoyne Park
	Pts: A Lang 0-6, D Feeney 0-2, O Gormely 0-1.	Report	Pts: F Ó Cinnseala 0-3, J Jennings 0-1, A Smyth 0-1, C Hoban 0-1, C Fallon 0-1, N Dooley 0-1.

17 April 2026 Round 5	Leitrim	0-11 (11) – (28) 3-19	Sligo	Carrick-on-Shannon
19:00				Venue: Heartland Credit Union Páirc Seán MacDiarmada
	Pts: S Keaney 0-6, C McCabe 0-2, J Bosquette 0-1, C McLaughlin 0-1, S Kelly 0-1.	Report	Pts: R Lang 0-10, J Kelly 0-5, R Healy 1-0, D Feeney 1-0, P Arnold 1-0, A Hannon 0-1, N McLoughlin 0-1, C O'Flaherty 0-1.

17 April 2026 Round 5	Mayo	1-12 (15) – (16) 2-10	Galway	Castlebar
19:00				Venue: Hastings Insurance MacHale Park
	Pts: C Hoban 1-5, F O Cinnseala 0-3, A Brogan 0-3, A Smyth 0-1.	Report	Pts: S Heneghan 2-2, E Burke 0-1, R Connolly 0-1, O Ó Neachtáin 0-1, J Cullinane 0-1, T Mitchell 0-1, M Mitchell 0-1, A Healy 0-1, A Hanrahan 0-1.

=== Connacht knockout stage ===
==== Connacht semi-final ====
1 May 2026 Semi-final	Sligo	0-12 (12) – (14) 0-14	Galway	Tubbercurry
18:30				Venue: Kilcoyne Park
	Pts: J Kelly 0-5 (2tp); R Lang 0-4 (3f); D Feeney 0-2 (1f); N McLoughlin 0-1.	Report	Pts: A Healy 0-4; E Burke (1f, 145) and O Ó Neachtáin 0-2 each; O Ó Suilleabháin, É Maher, T Mitchell, S Heneghan, M Mitchell and R Flaherty 0-1 each.

==== Connacht final ====
8 May 2026 Final	Roscommon	3-12 (21) – (20) 1-17	Galway	Tuam
19:00				Venue: Tuam Stadium
	Pts: J Coyne 1-3 (2fs); J Concannon and D Kelleher 1-0; R Carr 0-3 (1tp); J Lally (tp) and S Carthy 0-2 each; E Browne and B Lenehan 0-1 each.	Report	Pts: A Healy 1-2 (2fs); R Connolly (2tp) and E Burke (2tpf) 0-4 each; M Mitchell 0-3 (1f); A Hanrahan 0-2 (1f); J Cullinane and O Ó Suilleabháin 0-1 each.

== Leinster Minor Football Championship ==
=== Leinster Group 1 ===
Pos	Team	Pld	W	D	L	SF	SA	Diff	Pts	Qualification
1	Louth	3	3	0	0	50	39	+11	6	Advance to Semi-Finals
2	Kildare	3	2	0	1	49	40	+9	4	Advance to Quarter-Finals
3	Meath	3	1	0	2	67	40	+27	2	Advance to Preliminary Quarter-Finals
4	Laois	3	0	0	3	27	74	-47	0	

==== Leinster group 1 matches ====
24 March 2026 Round 1	Laois	0-09 (9) – (15) 1-12	Kildare	Portlaoise
19:30				Venue: Laois Hire O'Moore Park
	Pts: F Brennan 0-1 (45), C Murphy 0-1, E Harris 0-1, E Neilon 0-3 (3 frees), S Maree 0-1, O Gilligan 0-1.	Report	Pts: J Reilly 1-5 (penalty, 1 two-point free), G Kelly 0-3 (1 free), A Bergin 0-4 (4 frees).

26 March 2026 Round 1	Meath	2-07 (13) – (14) 0-14	Louth	Skryne
19:30
	Pts: C Walsh (2-3, 1tp), H McGuirk (0-1), T Dillon (0-1), M Stafford (0-1), D Loughran (0-1).	Report	Pts: P Maguire (0-5, 2tp, 1f), C Duff (0-2), C Kelly (0-2, 2f), J Lynch (0-1); B O’Neill (0-1), R McDonnell (0-1), C Marron (0-1); M Smith (0-1).

7 April 2026 Round 2	Louth	0-19 (19) – (11) 0-11	Laois	Hunterstown
19:30
	Pts: C Kelly (0-8, 4f, 1 '45), P Maguire (0-3, 1tp, 1f), C Marron (0-2); R McDonnell (0-2), J Lynch (0-1), B O’Neill (0-1), C Duff (0-1), A Traynor (0-1).	Report	Pts: F Brennan (0-4, 2 tpf), T Lawlor (0-2), D Timmons (0-2); C Murphy (0-1); S Maree (0-1), E Neilon (0-1).

7 April 2026 Round 2	Meath	1-11 (14) – (19) 1-16	Kildare	Skryne
19:30
	Pts: M Stafford 0-5, C Brennan 1-1; J Killoran 0-2, T Dillon 0-1, C Walsh 0-1, D Loughran 0-1.	Report	Pts: L Tennyson 1-3, G Kelly 0-5, J Reilly 0-4, E Lyons 0-2; L Mescal 0-1; P Ryan 0-1.

14 April 2026 Round 3	Kildare	1-12 (15) – (17) 1-14	Louth	Hawkfield
19:30				Venue: Manguard Park
	Pts: E Lyons 1-2 (penalty), G Kelly 0-5 (2 two-pointers), J Reilly 0-4 (2 frees), L Tennyson 0-1.	Report	Pts: C Kelly 1-6 (2 frees), R McDonnell 0-3, J Lynch 0-2, P Maguire 0-1, C Duff 0-1, C Marron 0-1.

14 April 2026 Round 3	Laois	0-07 (7) – (40) 6-22	Meath	Portlaoise
19:30				Venue: Laois Hire O'Moore Park
	Pts: F Brennan 0-3 (1 tp, 0-1f), W Craig, C Murphy, S Maree and E Harris 0-1 each.	Report	Pts: H McGuirk 2-5 (1 tp), C Walsh 1-6 (0-2fs), C Brennan 2-2, M Stafford 0-6 (0-1 45, 0-1f), T McKeever 1-2, N Smyth 0-1.

=== Leinster Group 2 ===
Pos	Team	Pld	W	D	L	SF	SA	Diff	Pts	Qualification
1	Dublin	3	2	0	1	78	51	+27	4	Advance to Semi-Finals
2	Offaly	3	2	0	1	67	50	+17	4	Advance to Quarter-Finals
3	Westmeath	3	2	0	1	56	48	+8	4	Advance to Preliminary Quarter-Finals
4	Longford	3	0	0	3	42	94	-52	0	

==== Leinster group 2 matches ====
24 March 2026 Round 1	Dublin	3-14 (23) – (16) 1-13	Offaly	Dublin
19:30				Venue: Parnell Park
	Pts: C Raftery 1-9 (3 P2); E Madden 1-1; C O’Dwyer 1-0; J Heavey 0-2 (1f); M Salami, A McDonnell 0-1 apiece.	Report	Pts: P Burns 0-6 (4f, 1 P2); D Stewart 1-0; O Goulding 0-3 (1f, 1 F2); D Waldron, J Slevin (P2) 0-2 each.

26 March 2026 Round 1	Longford	0-12 (12) – (24) 3-15	Westmeath	Newtownforbes
19:30				Venue: Allen Park
	Pts: E Beattie (0-4, 3 frees), N O’Donnell (0-2), O McNerney (0-1), C Fagan (0-1), O McHugh (0-1), D Toher (0-1); T Tiernan (0-1, free), L Madden (0-1).	Report	Pts: D Murray (1-2), J Murtagh (1-1), S McWade (0-4, 2 frees), F Brennan (1-0), A Mullen Adamson (0-2); A Connaire (0-2), D Kelly (0-1), C Cleary (0-1), C McKeogh (0-1), H Hughes (0-1).

31 March 2026 Round 2	Westmeath	1-16 (19) – (15) 1-12	Dublin	Kinnegad
19:30
	Pts: D Kelly 1-2; S McWade 0-5 (1f, 1 P2); D Murray 0-4 (1 P2); A Connaire 0-2; A Mullen Adamson, T Weir, C Clancy 0-1 apiece.	Report	Pts: C Raftery 1-8 (1 F2, 2 P2); J McCaghy, J Heavey (f), C O’Dwyer, A McDonnell 0-1 apiece.

7 April 2026 Round 2	Offaly	6-23 (41) – (15) 1-12	Longford	Kilcormac
19:30				Venue: Faithful Fields Offaly CoE
	Pts: P Burns 1-7 (2 x 2pf, 1 '45', 1f), O Goulding 1-3 (2f), D Waldron 0-5, D Stewart 1-2, J Harvey and S Lawless 1-1 each, S Monahan 1-0, C Carroll, P Duffy, E Daly and O Pender 0-1 each.	Report	Pts: R Rowan 1-1, O McHugh 0-3 (1 2p), C Shannon, N O’Donnell (2p) and L Madden (1f) 0-2 each, S Buckley (f) and E Beattie 0-1 each.

14 April 2026 Round 3	Longford	1-12 (15) – (29) 4-17	Dublin	Clonguish
19:30				Venue: Allen Park
	Pts: S Buckley 0-7 (1f, 2 P2); N O’Donnell 1-1; O McHugh 0-2 (P2); L Madden, C Shannon 0-1 apiece.	Report	Pts: M Salami 2-1; J Heavey 0-6 (2f, 1 P2); B Doyle, A McDonnell 1-0 each; C Raftery (1f, 1 F2), C O’Dwyer, J McCaghy (1 ’45, 1 F2) 0-3 each; M Morrison 0-1.

21 April 2026 Round 3	Westmeath	1-10 (13) – (21) 3-12	Offaly	Kinnegad
19:30
	Pts: D Murray 1-0, S McWade (2f) and A Connaire 0-2 each, C McKeogh, F Brennan, B Stenson, A Mullen Adamson, D Deegan and M Monaghan 0-1 each.	Report	Pts: P Burns 1-5 (2tpf, 0-1f), J Carroll and S Monahan 1-0 each, O Goulding 0-2 (2f), E Daly, D Stewart, D Waldron, S Murrihy, D Seery 0-1 each.

=== Leinster Group 3 ===
Pos	Team	Pld	W	D	L	SF	SA	Diff	Pts	Qualification
1	Wicklow	3	3	0	0	71	28	+43	6	Advance to Preliminary Quarter-Finals
2	Carlow	3	2	0	1	63	44	+19	4	Advance to Preliminary Quarter-Finals
3	Wexford	3	1	0	2	34	36	-2	2	
4	Kilkenny	3	0	0	3	20	80	-60	0	

==== Leinster group 3 matches ====
24 March 2026 Round 1	Wexford	0-03 (3) – (14) 0-14	Wicklow	Wexford
19:30				Venue: Chadwicks Wexford Park
	Pts: Cian Kavanagh 0-2, R Dee 0-1.	Report	Pts: J Furlong 0-3, J Keeshan 0-3, S Corrigan 0-3, E Lacey 0-1, C Fitzgerald 0-1, C Devereux 0-1, J McCarney 0-1, S Goodbody 0-1.

24 March 2026 Round 1	Kilkenny	2-04 (10) – (26) 4-14	Carlow	Dunmore
19:30				Venue: MW Hire Training Centre
	Pts: D Phelan 1-0, S Daly 1-0, A McCormack 0-2, F Gillespie 0-2.	Report	Pts: C Burgess 1-1, M Redmond 1-1, J Monahan 1-1, R Nolan 1-0, D McMahon 0-3, J McDonald 0-2, K Byrne 0-1, E Treacy 0-1, A Joyce 0-1, S Sheehan 0-1, T Hennessy 0-1, T Mudawapi 0-1.

7 April 2026 Round 2	Wicklow	3-15 (24) – (22) 1-19	Carlow	Aughrim
18:30				Venue: Echelon Park
	Pts: O Cullen 1-7, H Butler 1-1, J Keeshan 1-1, L Reid 0-2, C Fitzgerald 0-1, S Corrigan 0-1, J McCarney 0-1, J Furlong 0-1.	Report	Pts: A Doyle 0-10, R Dooley 0-4, E Treacy 1-0, D Casey 0-2, C Murphy 0-1, J Monahan 0-1, E Byrne 0-1.

7 April 2026 Round 2	Kilkenny	1-04 (7) – (21) 2-15	Wexford	Dunmore
19:30				Venue: MW Hire Training Centre
	Pts: E Maher 1-0, D Sweetman 0-2, R Lawlor 0-1, D Phelan 0-1.	Report	Pts: S O'Brien 1-1, R Dee 1-0, S Sinnott 0-3, J Forde 0-3, D O'Hanlon 0-3, Cian Kavanagh 0-2, H Asple 0-2, R O'Dwyer 0-1.

14 April 2026 Round 3	Kilkenny	0-03 (3) – (33) 5-18	Wicklow	Dunmore
19:30				Venue: MW Hire Training Centre
	Pts: D Sweetman 0-2, C Byrne 0-1.	Report	Pts: N Sinnott 2-3, F Kennedy 2-0, J Dempsey 1-1, D Duffy 0-3, D Doyle 0-2, R Behan 0-2, J Furlong 0-2, E Hutton 0-1, W O'Connor 0-1, S Goodbody 0-1, C Czwalina 0-1, C Fitzgerald 0-1.

16 April 2026 Round 3	Carlow	0-15 (15) – (15) 0-10	Wexford	Carlow
19:30				Venue: Netwatch Cullen Park
	Pts: R Dooley 0-6 (2-2ps f), A Doyle 0-5 (1-2pf, 2fs), C Murphy, A Joyce, E Treacy, D McMahon 0-1 each.	Report	Pts: Cian Kavanagh 0-5 (5fs), H Asple 0-2, D O’Hanlon, PJ Breen, J Forde 0-1 each.

=== Leinster Knockout Stage ===
Preliminary Quarter-Finals
Meath	6-23
Wicklow	0-05
Westmeath	1-14
Carlow	1-12

Quarter-Finals
Meath	5-16
Offaly	0-09
Westmeath	0-12
Kildare	5-15

Semi-Finals
Dublin	2-08
Meath	2-14
Louth	0-10
Kildare	1-11

Minor Leinster Final
Meath	0-00
Kildare	0-00

==== Leinster preliminary quarter-finals ====
28 April 2026 Preliminary quarter-final	Wicklow	0-05 (5) – (41) 6-23	Meath	Aughrim
18:30				Venue: Echelon Park
	Pts: S Corrigan 0-1, H Butler 0-1, J Furlong 0-1, J Keeshan 0-1, O Cullen 0-1.	Report	Pts: M Stafford 3-2, H McGurk 0-8, C McKenna 1-2, D Loughran 1-1, C Brennan 1-1, C Walsh 0-4, T Proudfoot 0-1, T Dillon 0-1, O Farrelly 0-1, L Kavanagh 0-1, A Keane 0-1.

28 April 2026 Preliminary Quarter-Final	Westmeath	1-14 (17) – (15) 1-12	Carlow	Tubberclair
19:30
	Pts: A Connaire 1-5, S McWade 0-3, D Deegan 0-3, D Kelly 0-2, C Cleary 0-1.	Report	Pts: A Doyle 0-7, E Treacy 1-0, C Murphy 0-2, A Joyce 0-1, R Dooley 0-1, M Redmond 0-1.

==== Leinster quarter-finals ====
5 May 2026 Quarter-final	Offaly	0-09 (9) – (31) 5-16	Meath	Tullamore
18:30				Venue: Glenisk O'Connor Park
	Pts: P Burns 0-5 (1 x 2pf, 3f), D Stewart, D Waldron, S Monahan and J Furey 0-1 each.	Report Report]	Pts: C Walsh 0-6 (3f), T Proudfoot, C Brennan and H Mofatt 1-1 each, L O'Donoghue and D Loughran 1-0 each, H McGuirk and C McKenna 0-2 each, M Stafford ('45'), T Dillon and C Comey (f) 0-1 each.

5 May 2026 Quarter-Final	Westmeath	0-12 (12) – (30) 5-15	Kildare	Mullingar
18:30				Venue: TEG Cusack Park
	Pts: M Monaghan 0-4 (2pf), S McWade 0-2 (2f), A Connaire 0-2 (2pt), D Murray 0-2, D Kelly 0-1, C Cleary 0-1.	Report	Pts: A Tobin 1-2, C Kehoe 1-2, J Doran 1-1, L Mescal 1-1; J Flood 1-0, E Lyons 0-3; P Ryan 0-2; J Reilly 0-2 (1f), F Lawlor 0-1, L Tenneyson 0-1.

==== Leinster semi-finals ====
12 May 2026 Semi-final	Dublin	2-08 (14) – (20) 2-14	Meath	Dublin
19:30				Venue: Parnell Park
	Pts: P Cahill 1-2 (0-1f); E Madden 1-1; J McCaghy 0-3 (1 tpf); M Morrison, M Salami 0-1 apiece.	Report	Pts: M Stafford 1-4 (1-0pen, 0-1f, 0-1 ’45); C McKenna 1-1; H McGuirk (1 tp), C Brennan 0-3 each; D Loughran, L Kavanagh, T McKeever 0-1 apiece.

12 May 2026 Semi-final	Louth	0-10 (10) – (14) 1-11	Kildare	Ardee
19:30				Venue: Páirc Baile Fiach
	Pts: C Kelly 0-5 (1tpf, 1’45, 2f), D Reidy 0-2, C Duff 0-2, B O’Neill 0-1.	Report	Pts: J Doran 1-0, J Reilly 0-2f, E Lyons 0-2, A Tobin 0-2, C Keogh 0-1, P Ryan 0-1; L Tennyson 0-1f, F Martin 0-1.

==== Leinster final ====
22 May 2026 Final	Meath	1-16 (19) – (19) 2-13 (a.e.t.) (3-5 pen)	Kildare	Portlaoise
19:35				Venue: Laois Hire O'Moore Park
	Pts: M Stafford 0-6 (0-3f, 1 tp), L O'Donoghue 1-0, C Brennan 0-3, H McGuirk 0-3, C Fitzsimons 0-1, 1f, L Kavanagh 0-1, C Walsh 0-1, T Dillon 0-1.	Report	Pts: G Kelly 1-2, L Tennyson 1-2 (0-1f), J Reilly 0-5 (0-4f), E Lyons 0-2 (0-1f), F Lawlor 0-1, P Ryan 0-1.
		Penalty shootout

== Munster Minor Football Championship ==
=== Munster phase 1 ===
Pos	Team	Pld	W	D	L	SF	SA	Diff	Pts	Qualification
1	Waterford	3	3	0	0	49	39	+10	6	Advance to Phase 2
2	Clare	3	2	0	1	38	38	+0	4	Advance to Phase 2
3	Limerick	3	1	0	2	40	37	+3	2	
4	Tipperary	3	0	0	3	33	46	-13	0	

29 March 2026 Round 1	Tipperary	1-04 (7) – (12) 1-09	Limerick	Lattin
14:00				Venue: Hannon GAA Park
	Pts: C Morrissey 1-2 (0-2 frees), R Grace, H Carolan 0-1 each.	Report	Pts: C McCarthy 0-4 (3 frees), S O’Flynn 1-1, T Gavin (free), C Murphy, E Hogan, C Donnelly 0-1 each	Referee: G Twoney (Clare)

30 March 2026 Round 1	Clare	0-10 (10) – (13) 0-13	Waterford	Quilty
19:00				Venue: Páirc Naomh Mhuire
	Pts: L Keane (2f), S O’Callaghan (1tp) 0-4 each; R Cotter, R Kelly 0-1 each.	Report	Pts: D Gough 0-7 (2tpf, 3f); P Murray 0-2; E Bloomer, R Kirwan, T Meagher, T Walsh 0-1 each.	Referee: C Murphy (Cork)

6 April 2026 Round 2	Waterford	3-11 (20) – (14) 0-14	Tipperary	Lemybrien
19:00				Venue: Páirc Naomh Bríd
	Pts: D Gough 1-9 (2 tpf, 1tp, 3f); R Hallahan 2-0; S Healy and P Murray 0-1 each.	Report	Pts: D Cashin 0-4 (1 tpf, 2f); H Carolan 0-3 (1 tp); C O Meara 0-3 (1f); C Morrissey 0-2 (1f); R Grace and E Lonergan 0-1 each	Referee: E Keane (Clare)

6 April 2026 Round 2	Limerick	1-10 (13) – (14) 0-14	Clare	Mountcollins
19:00
	Pts: C McCarthy (0-5; 3f, 1tp); S O’Flynn (1-0); J McAuliffe (0-2); C Murphy, R O’Dwyer, T Gavin (free) (0-1 each).	Report	Pts: L Keane (0-9; 1 tpf, 1 tp, 3f); M Normoyle (0-3; 2f); S O’Callaghan, T Dillon (free) (0-1 each).	Referee: C Murphy (Cork)

13 April 2026 Round 3	Clare	2-08 (14) – (12) 2-06	Tipperary	Clarecastle
19:00				Venue: Clarecastle Grounds
	Pts: L Keane 1-5 (4f); T Dillon 1-2 (1f); R Kelly 0-1	Report	Pts: C O’Meara (1-0 Pen, 1f), C Morrissey 1-1 each; H Carolan 0-2 (tp); D Chasin (’45), J Donnelly 0-1 each	Referee: C Murphy (Cork)

13 April 2026 Round 3	Waterford	1-13 (16) – (15) 1-12	Limerick	Lemybrien
19:00				Venue: Páirc Naomh Bríd
	Pts: D Gough (0-6, 1 tpf, 0-2 f), T Meagher (1-1), L O’Grady (tp), A McMaugh (0-2 each), C Kelly, C Smyth (0-1 each).	Report	Pts: C McCarthy (0-5, 2 tp, 0-1 f), C O’Dwyer (0-4), B Delahunty (1-0), E Hogan, O Stokes, T Gavin (0-1 each).	Referee: B Crowley (Cork)

=== Munster phase 2 ===
Pos	Team	Pld	W	D	L	SF	SA	Diff	Pts	Qualification
1	Cork	3	3	0	0	92	44	+48	6	Advance to Munster Final
2	Kerry	3	2	0	1	67	53	+14	4	Advance to Munster Final
3	Clare	3	1	0	2	37	69	-32	2	
4	Waterford	3	0	0	3	38	68	-30	0	

==== Munster phase 2 matches ====
27 April 2026 Round 1	Waterford	2-09 (15) – (26) 3-17	Kerry	Lemybrien
19:00				Venue: Páirc Naomh Bríd
	Pts: D Gough (0-6, 1 tpf, 0-4 f), C Johnston, A O’Donnell (1-0 each), P Murray (0-3).	Report	Pts: D Lane (1-4, 0-1 f), F O’Dowd (1-3, 0-1 f), D Murphy (1-2, 1 tp), D Keane (0-4, 1 tpf, 0-2 f), L MacGearailt, S Scroope, J Collins, O Buckley (0-1 each).	Referee: G Twomey (Clare)

27 April 2026 Round 1	Clare	0-12 (12) – (37) 4-25	Cork	Clarecastle
19:00				Venue: Clarecastle GAA Grounds
	Pts: L Keane 0-5 (0-4 f), S O’Callaghan 0-2 (1 2pt), C Killeen, R Cotter, T Dillon, R Kelly, R Brady 0-1 each.	Report	Pts: T Whooley 1-5, J Miskella, D Herlihy 1-2 each, B Hegarty 0-4 (0-2 f), C Murphy (1 2pt), E Ahern, A O’Herlihy 0-3 each, J Barry 1-0, C Garvey, C Downing, R Coakley 0-1 each.	Referee: E Ó Muircheartaigh (Kerry)

4 May 2026 Round 2	Kerry	1-14 (17) – (27) 3-18	Cork	Tralee
19:00				Venue: Austin Stack Park
	Pts: D Keane 0-7 (1 2pt, 0-2 f), D Laide 1-1, D Lane 0-3 (0-1 f), L Mac Gearailt, D Murphy, C Moynihan 0-1 each.	Report	Pts: B Hegarty 0-6 (0-5 f), R O’Donovan 1-3, E Ahern 1-2 (0-2 f), A O’Herlihy 0-3, L O’Neill 1-0, K O’Shea, R Twohig (1 2pt f) 0-2 each.	Referee: E Keane (Clare)

4 May 2026 Round 2	Waterford	0-08 (8) – (14) 2-08	Clare	Lemybrien
19:00				Venue: Páirc Naomh Bríd
	Pts: D Gough (0-2; 0-2f); A McMaugh (0-2); L O’Grady (0-2; 1tp); C Kelly and A O’Donnell (0-1 each)	Report	Pts: T Dillon (2-2; 0-1f); S Cahill (0-3); L Keane, R Kelly and M Normoyle (0-1 each)	Referee: Ciarán Murphy (Cork)

11 May 2026 Round 3	Cork	3-19 (28) – (15) 1-12	Waterford	Cork
19:00				Venue: Páirc Uí Rinn
	Pts: A O’Herlihy 1-3, J Miskella 0-3, P Kelly, R O’Donovan 1-0 each, C Murphy (1 2pt), J Barry (1 2pt), E Ahern (0-2 f), R Twohig (1 2pt f), M Corkery, K O’Shea 0-2 each, K O’Donovan 0-1.	Report	Pts: D Gough 0-6 (0-4 f, 1 2pt), L O’Grady 0-3 (1 2pt), E Lavery 1-0, E Bloomer 0-2, A O’Donnell 0-1.	Referee: S Joy (Kerry)

11 May 2026 Round 3	Kerry	1-21 (24) – (11) 0-11	Clare	Tralee
19:00				Venue: Austin Stack Park
	Pts: D Lane (1-3), D Keane (3f) and F O’Dowd (0-4 each). D Murphy (0-3), J Collins and L Mac Gearailt (0-2 each), C Stack, C Clifford and C O’Donoghue (0-1 each)	Report	Pts: S O’Callaghan ( 0-3,tp), R Cotter and T Dillon ( tp) ( 0-2 each) T Bane, S Cahill, L Keane and M Normoyle ( 0-1 each)	Referee: B Crowley (Cork)

=== Knockout stage ===
==== Munster final ====
18 May 2026 Final	Cork	1-13 (16) – (14) 0-14 (a.e.t.)	Kerry	Cork
19:35				Venue: Páirc Uí Rinn
	Pts: R Twohig 0-4 (1 2pt f, 0-2 f), J Barry 1-0, B Hegarty 0-3 (0-1 f), E Lynch, T Whooley, K O’Shea, D Herlihy, R O’Donovan, C Murphy 0-1 each.	Report	Pts: D Keane 0-6 (2 2pt f, 0-2 f), F O’Dowd 0-3 (0-1 f), D Lane, C Stack, T Kennelly, C Moynihan, L Mac Gearailt 0-1 each.	Referee: G Twomey (Clare)

== Ulster Minor Football Championship ==
=== Qualifiers ===
==== Ulster preliminary round ====
11 April 2026 Preliminary round	Down	2-19 (25) – (5) 1-02	Fermanagh	Newry
12:00				Venue: Páirc Esler
	Pts: P Joyce (1-6, 1tp), D McAleenan (1-5, 1f), C Gallagher (0-3), T Conway (0-2); F McHugh (0-1), E Crosbie (0-1), S Murdock (0-1).	Report	Pts: D McLoughlin (1-0), R Fitzpatrick (0-1,1f), J Martin (0-1).	Referee: O McKee

==== Ulster round 1 ====
18 April 2026 Round 1	Monaghan	3-14 (23) – (13) 1-10	Antrim	Clones
12:00				Venue: St Tiernach's Park
	Pts: M Doogan-Burke 1-1, A McGinnity 0-4, M Treanor 1-0, A Borsje 1-0, C McKenna 0-3, D Feeney 0-1, C MacCionnaith 0-1, M Palauska 0-1.	Report	Pts: D Campbell 0-4, J Griffin 1-0, T Convery 0-3, S McCormack 0-1, D Thornbury 0-1, C McKeever 0-1.	Referee: M Turley

18 April 2026 Round 1	Tyrone	1-16 (19) – (10) 0-10	Armagh	Omagh
12:00		(HT: 1-6 - 0-5)		Venue: O'Neills Healy Park
	Pts: B Óg McGuckian 0-4, C Fyffe 1-0, MJ Daly 0-3, MF Daly 0-3, L O'Conor 0-2, C McKeown 0-1, F Quinn 0-1, C Meenan 0-1, R O'Neill 0-1.	Report	Pts: S Toner 0-4, O Leneghan 0-2, E McElvanna 0-1, C Feeney 0-1, T Feeney 0-1, C Barry 0-1.	Referee: Micheál Moore

18 April 2026 Round 1	Cavan	2-13 (19) – (18) 2-12	Donegal	Cavan
12:00				Venue: Kingspan Breffni
	Pts: J Graham 1-5, O Smith 1-1, D Eccleston 0-2, C McCabe 0-2, J Forde 0-1, J Brady 0-1, D McCrystal 0-1, H Morgan 0-1.	Report	Pts: MJ Ward 0-6, E Duffy 1-0, T McDaid 1-0, A McGuinness 0-2, D O'Hara 0-1, T McHugh 0-1, M McGinley 0-1, M Wilkinson 0-1.	Referee: Thomas Devlin

18 April 2026 Round 1	Derry	1-12 (15) – (14) 1-11	Down	Owenbeg
12:00				Venue: Find Insurance Owenbeg
	Pts: C McDonnell 1-0, C Campbell 0-3, D Mulholland 0-3 (1f), L Higgins 0-2, M Doherty 0-1 (1f), N McDermott 0-1, T Devlin 0-1, G Gormley 0-1.	Report	Pts: D McAleenan 0-6 (1tpf, 2f), D Kelly 0-1, C Gallagher 0-1, S Murdock 0-1, F McHugh 1-1, D Ward 0-1.	Referee: Marty Coyle

==== Ulster qualifiers round 1 ====
25 April 2026 Qualifiers round 1	Antrim	0-13 (13) – (17) 1-14	Armagh	Dunsilly
12:00				Venue: Antrim GAA CoE
		Report	Pts: S Toner 1-5, E McElvanna 0-3, F Maxwell 0-1, N Murphy 0-1, C Feeney 0-1, C Barry 0-1, O McGrattan 0-1, A Carson-Gallagher 0-1.

==== Ulster round 2 ====
2 May 2026 Round 2	Monaghan	0-18 (18) – (25) 3-16	Tyrone	Inniskeen
12:00				Venue: Páirc Grattan
	Pts: N Hughes 0-5 (1 x tpf, 1f), A McGinnity 0-4 (2f), M Burke 0-3 (1 x tp), L Kelly 0-2, C Kelly 0-2 (tp), S McKenna 0-1, M Palauskas 0-1	Report	Pts: C Canavan 2-5 (1f), V Gormley 1-3, A Corry 0-2, MF Daly 0-2, MJ Daly 0-1, T Gallen 0-1, C Meenan 0-1 (f), B Og McGuckin 0-1

2 May 2026 Round 2	Derry	1-17 (20) – (12) 1-09	Cavan	Owenbeg
12:00				Venue: Find Insurance Owenbeg
	Pts: D Mulholland 1-2 (1f), M Doherty 0-2 (1tpf), L Higgins 0-2, T Bradley 0-3, G Gormley 0-3 (1tp), P McPeake 0-3 (1tpf, 1f), T Devlin 0-1, D Collins 0-1.	Report	Pts: E Imade 0-2, D Eccleston 0-2 (1tpf), S Kolimar 0-1, O Clarke 0-1, J Brady 1-1, J Graham 0-2 (1f).

==== Ulster qualifiers round 2 ====
2 May 2026 Qualifiers round 2	Armagh	2-22 (28) – (14) 1-11	Fermanagh	Armagh
12:00				Venue: BOX-IT Athletic Grounds
	Pts: F Maxwell 1-3, S Toner 1-2, C Barry 0-4, O Lenaghan 0-4 (1tp), N Murphy 0-2, C Vallely 0-2, T Feeney 0-2, B Ferreira 0-1, D McDonnell 0-1, J King 0-1, E McElvanna 0-1.	Report

9 May 2026 Qualifiers Round 2	Donegal	1-15 (18) – (16) 1-13	Down	Convoy
13:30				Venue: Donegal GAA Centre
	Pts: MA McGuinness 1-4,1tp, 2f; D O’Hare 0-3, 1tpf, 1f; A McGinley 0-2; T McDaid 0-1,1’45; MJ Ward 0-1,1f; J Cannon, C Dorrian, F Coyle and C Griffin 0-1 each.	Report	Pts: J O’Hagan 1-0; P Joyce 0-4, 1tp, T Conway 0-2; D McAleenman 0-2, 2f; B Clarke 0-2,1f; C Gallagher, J O’Mahony, R Austin 0-1 each.

=== Ulster knockout stage ===
Quarter-Finals
Monaghan	2-15
Donegal	2-16
Cavan	2-23
Armagh	1-06

Semi-Finals
Derry	0-10
Donegal	0-09
Tyrone	1-18
Cavan	3-10

Minor Ulster Final
Derry	1-12
Tyrone	2-16

==== Ulster quarter-finals ====
16 May 2026 Quarter-final	Donegal	2-16 (22) – (21) 2-15	Monaghan	Convoy
12:45				Venue: Donegal GAA Centre
	Pts: MA McGuinness 2-4,1-0pen, 1tp,1tpf; D Og Cooney 0-4; D O'Hare 0-3,tp,1f; T McHugh, MJ Ward, C Dorrian, J Cannon, F Gillespie 0-1 each.	Report	Pts: C Kelly 1-3,1tp; M Doogan Burke 1-1; C McKenna 0-3,1tp; L Kelly 0-3; C Kelly, A McGinnity (1f) 0-2 each; D Feeney 0-1.

16 May 2026 Quarter-final	Armagh	1-06 (9) – (29) 2-23	Cavan	Crossmaglen
12:00				Venue: St Oliver Plunkett Park
	Pts: O Lenaghan 1-1, C Vallely 0-2 (1tp), C Barry 0-2, S Toner 0-1 (45).	Report	Pts: J Graham 1-12, D McCrystal 1-1, J Brady 0-3, Z Byrne 0-2, O Clarke 0-1, J Forde 0-1, F McCaul 0-1, D Eccleston 0-1, S Kolimar 0-1.

==== Ulster semi-finals ====
23 May 2026 Semi-final	Derry	0-10 (10) – (9) 0-09	Donegal	Owenbeg
12:00				Venue: Find Insurance Owenbeg
	Pts: D Mulholland 0-3,1f; P McPeake 0-2, 2f; M Doherty 0-2, 1tpf; R Devlin 0-2; C McDonnell 0-1.	Report	Pts: T McDaid 0-2; F Gillespie 0-2; C Griffin 0-1; C Dorrian 0-1; M McGinley 0-1; MA McGuinness 0-1 (1f), F Coyle 0-1.	Referee: J Lewis (Fermanagh)

23 May 2026 Semi-final	Tyrone	1-18 (21) – (19) 3-10	Cavan	Omagh
12:00				Venue: O'Neills Healy Park
	Pts: C Canavan 0-10, T Gallen 1-0, L O'Connor 0-3, C Meenan 0-1, R O'Neill 0-1, MF Daly 0-1, V Gormley 0-1, C McKeown 0-1.	Report	Pts: J Brady 1-5, J Graham 0-5, E Imade 1-0, F McCaul 1-0.

==== Ulster final ====
29 May 2026 Final	Derry	1-12 (15) – (22) 2-16	Tyrone	Letterkenny
19:15				Venue: O'Donnell Park
	Pts: C O’Kane 1-0, N McDermott 0-4 (1f, 1tpf), D Mulholland 0-3 (3f), T Devlin, P McPeake (tpf) 0-2 each, R Devlin 0-1.	Report	Pts: C Canavan 1-4 (1f, 1tpf) L O’Connor 1-1, C Meenan 0-3 (1tp), MJ Daly (tp), MF Daly 0-2 each, B Og McGuckin, A Corry, C Fyffe, R O’Neill 0-1 each.	Referee: N McGeown (Armagh)

== All-Ireland Minor Football Championship ==
=== Bracket ===
Quarter-Finals		Semi-Finals		All-Ireland Minor Football Final
Roscommon	1-09
Derry	2-12	Derry	2-08
Cork	3-19	Cork	2-19
Meath	1-12			Cork	2-16
Kildare	4-12			Tyrone	1-16
Kerry	2-13	Kildare	1-12
Tyrone	3-17	Tyrone	1-15
Galway	0-19

=== All-Ireland quarter-finals ===
6 June 2026 Quarter-final	Cork	3-19 (28) – (15) 1-12	Meath	Thurles
14:00				Venue: FBD Semple Stadium
	Gls: R Twohig 0-9 (3 2pt f, 0-2 45, 0-1 f), J Miskella 1-3 (1 2pt), T Whooley 0-4, K O’Shea, E Ahern 1-0 each, B Hegarty, A O’Herlihy, C Murphy 0-1 each.	Report	Gls: H McGuirk 1-4 (1 2pt), C Walsh 0-3, M Stafford 0-2 (1 2pt f), N Smyth, C McKenna, C Brennan 0-1 each.	Referee: E O'Connor (Offaly)

6 June 2026 Quarter-final	Tyrone	3-17 (26) – (19) 0-19	Galway	Ashbourne
14:00				Venue: Donaghmore Ashbourne GAA
	Gls: B Óg McGuckin 1-3; V Gormley 0-4; MF Daly and MJ Daly 1-1 each; T Gallen, L O'Connor and C Canavan (2f) 0-2 each; R O'Neill and A Corry 0-1 each.	Report	Gls: O Ó Neachtain 0-7 (3tp, 1f); A Hanrahan 0-6 (3f); E Burke 0-3 (1tpf, 1f); É Maher 0-2; M Mitchell 0-1.	Referee: I Howley (Dublin)

6 June 2026 Quarter-final	Kildare	4-12 (24) – (19) 2-13	Kerry	Limerick
15:00				Venue: TUS Gaelic Grounds
	Gls: C Keogh 2-0, J Reilly 1-4 (1tp, 2f), E Lyons 0-3 (1tp), C Cowzer 1-0, G Kelly 0-2 (1tp), P Ryan 0-1 C Doran 0-1, L Tennyson 0-1’45	Report	Gls: D Keane 0-3fs, M Ó Sé 1-0, C Moynihan 1-2 (1tp), M Somers 0-2 (1tp), K Fitzgerald 0-2 (1tpf), L Mac Gearailt 0-1, M Corridon 0-1, D Murphy 0-1, D Lane 0-1.	Referee: J Regan (Cork)

6 June 2026 Quarter-final	Roscommon	1-09 (12) – (18) 2-12	Derry	Cavan
19:00				Venue: Kingspan Breffni
	Gls: S Carthy 0-3 (1 2pf, 1f), J Concannon 1-0, S Duggan 0-2 (1 2p), R Carr 0-2 (1 2p), J Coyne 0-1 (1’45), C Nerney 0-1 (1f).	Report	Gls: R Devlin 1-2, G Gormley 1-0, N McDermott 0-3 (1 2pf), L Higgins 0-2, T Bradley 0-2, D Mulholland 0-1, J McCartney 0-1, T Devlin 0-1.	Referee: E English (Dublin)

=== All-Ireland semi-finals ===
19 June 2026 Semi-final	Tyrone	1-15 (18) – (15) 1-12	Kildare	Cavan
19:35				Venue: Kingspan Breffni
	Gls: C Canavan 1-0, MF Daly 0-6 (1tp), B Og McGuckin 0-4 (1tp), M J Daly 0-2, A Corry, F Quinn, L O’Connor 0-1 each.	Report	Gls: J Reilly 1-7 (1tp), G Kelly 0-2, A Tobin, E Lyons, L Tennyson 0-1 each.	Referee: C Ryan (Galway)

20 June 2026 Semi-final	Cork	2-19 (25) – (14) 2-08	Derry	Dublin
16:00				Venue: Parnell Park
	Gls: R Twohig 0-5 (1 2pt f, 0-2 45, 0-1 f), T Whooley 1-2, E Ahern 0-4 (0-3 f), A O’Herlihy 1-0, B Hegarty (0-1 f), K O’Donovan, J Miskella 0-2 each, D O’Sullivan (mark), D Herlihy 0-1 each.	Report	Gls: C O’Kane, R Devlin 1-0 each, D Mulholland, N McDermott (0-2 f) 0-3 each, T Bradley, T Delvin 0-1 each.	Referee: A Coyne (Westmeath)

=== All-Ireland final ===
5 July 2026 Final	Cork	2-16 (22) – (19) 1-16	Tyrone	Newbridge
14:00				Venue: Cedral St Conleth's Park
	Gls: E Ahern 1-5 (0-4 f), J Miskella 0-5 (2 2pt), A O’Herlihy 1-1, T Whooley 0-2, B Hegarty (0-1 f), J Barry, C Murphy 0-1 each.	Report	Gls: V Gormley 0-6 (1 2pt), MF Daly, B Óg McGuckin (0-1 f), C Canavan (1 2pt f, 0-1 f) 0-3 each, A Corry 1-0 pen, T Gallen 0-1.	Referee: S Mulhare (Laois)

== Championship statistics ==
=== Top scorers ===
Rank	Player	Club	Tally	Total	Matches	Average
1	Jack Reilly	Kildare	3-33	42	8	5.25
2	Milo Stafford	Meath	4-27	39	8	4.87
2	Dara Gough	Waterford	1-36	39	6	6.50
4	Conan Canavan	Tyrone	4-24	36	6	6.00
5	Harry McGuirk	Meath	3-26	35	8	4.37
6	Cormac Walsh	Meath	3-24	33	8	4.12
7	Jay Graham	Cavan	2-24	30	4	7.50
7	Ryan Lang	Sligo	1-27	30	5	6.00
9	Paddy Burns	Offaly	2-23	29	4	7.25
10	Liam Keane	Clare	1-25	28	6	4.66
