= 1934 All-Ireland Minor Football Championship =

Gaelic football competition

Championship details

All-Ireland Champions
- Winning team: Tipperary (1st win)

All-Ireland Finalists

Provincial Champions
- Munster: Tipperary
- Leinster: Dublin
- Ulster: Tyrone
- Connacht: Mayo

The 1934 All-Ireland Minor Football Championship was the sixth staging of the All-Ireland Minor Football Championship, the Gaelic Athletic Association's premier inter-county Gaelic football tournament for boys under the age of 18.

Kerry entered as defending champions, however, they were beaten by Tipperary in the Munster semi-final.

Tipperary, who defeated Mayo in the All-Ireland semi-final on 9 September 1934, were declared the champions as the other semi-finalists, Dublin and Tyrone, were disqualified. This was their first All-Ireland title.

== Results ==
=== All-Ireland Minor Football Championship ===
Semi-finals

Final Tipperary awarded.
