= Éanna O'Hanlon =

Irish Gaelic footballer

Personal information
- Native name: Éanna Ó hAnluain (Irish)
- Born: 2000 (age 25–26) Dromahane, County Cork, Ireland

Sport
- Sport: Gaelic football
- Position: Full-forward
Club
- Years: Club
- 2018-present: Kilshannig
Club titles
- Cork titles: 0
College
- Years: College
- MTU Cork
College titles
- Sigerson titles: 0
Inter-county
Years	County	Apps (scores)
2024-present	Cork	1 (0-00)
Inter-county titles
- Munster titles: 0
- All-Irelands: 0
- NFL: 0
- All Stars: 0

Éanna O'Hanlon (born 2000) is an Irish Gaelic footballer. At club level, he plays with Kilshannig and at inter-county level with the Cork senior football team.

== Career ==
O'Hanlon played Gaelic football and hurling at all levels as a student at the Patrician Academy in Mallow. He was part of the school team that beat St Francis College to win the Simcox Cup in 2019. O'Hanlon was at midfield when the Patrician Academy beat St Paul's Secondary School by 2–14 to 3–08 to claim the All-Ireland PPS SCFC title in 2019. He later played with MTU Cork in the Sigerson Cup.

At club level, O'Hanlon first played for Kilshannig at juvenile and underage levels, winning a Rebel Óg Premier 2 MFC title in 2018. He immediately progressed to adult level and won a Cork JAFC medal in 2019 after a 0–22 to 0–11 defeat of St James' in the final. A Cork IAFC medal followed for O'Hanlon in 2022, following a defeat of Aghabullogue. He was team captain when Kilshannig won the Cork PIFC title in 2024, after another defeat of Aghabullogue in a final replay.

O'Hanlon first played for Cork at inter-county level as a member of the under-20 team. He was a non-playing substitute when Cork won the All-Ireland U20FC in 2019, following a 3–16 to 1–14 defeat of Dublin. O'Hanlon was added to the senior team in December 2024 and made his debut in a 1–13 to 0–12 defeat by Meath in the 2025 All-Ireland SFC.

== Career statistics ==
As of 24 May 2025.

Team	Year	National League			Munster		All-Ireland		Total	
Team	Year	Division	Apps	Score	Apps	Score	Apps	Score	Apps	Score
Cork	2025	Division 2	0	0-00	0	0-00	1	0-00	1	0-00
Career total			0	0-00	0	0-00	1	0-00	1	0-00

== Honours ==
Patrician Academy

- Simcox Cup: 2019
- Cork PPS Senior B Hurling Championship: 2019
- All-Ireland PPS Senior C Football Championship: 2019
- Munster PPS Senior C Football Championship: 2019

Kilshannig

- Cork Premier Intermediate Football Championship: 2024
- Cork Intermediate A Football Championship: 2022
- Cork Premier Junior Hurling Championship: 2026
- Cork Junior A Hurling Championship: 2025
- Cork Junior A Football Championship: 2019
- North Cork Junior A Football Championship: 2019
- North Cork Junior A Hurling Championship: 2022, 2025
- Rebel Óg Premier 2 Minor Football Championship: 2018

Cork

- All-Ireland Under-20 Football Championship: 2019
- Munster Under-20 Football Championship: 2019
