= Dowdallshill GF & AC =

Louth -based Gaelic games club

- Mullach an Dúdálaigh
- Founded: 1886
- County: Louth
- Nickname: The Dowdallers
- Colours: Red and green
- Grounds: Páirc Naomh Bríd
- Coordinates: 54°01′26″N 6°23′43″W

Playing kits
Standard colours

Dowdallshill Gaelic Football and Athletics Club (Dowdallshill GF & AC) is a GAA club from Dundalk, County Louth, which fields Gaelic football teams in competitions organised by Louth GAA. Of the six gaelic football clubs in the Dundalk urban area, Dowdallshill is the only one located north of the Castletown River.

== History ==
Entrance to Páirc Naomh Bríd, located on the Newry Road.

The Dowdallshill club was founded in 1886, making it one of the oldest gaelic football teams in Ireland. They contested the inaugural Louth Senior Football Championship final in 1887 against Dundalk Young Irelands at Haggardstown. The match finished in a scoreless draw. Young Irelands won the replay by 0–03 to 0–02.

A lack of playing personnel in 1908 saw the club disappear from Louth football for a prolonged period. A group of local men came together in 1928 and reorganized the club. These included Patsy Hearty, Paddy McCourt, Willie Curran, Jim McKeown, Tom Toal and Larry and Packie O'Hanlon.

1934 was a vintage year for the club. The MacArdle Cup for the Louth Junior League was won with victory in the final against Geraldines. Another trophy would soon follow as the Dowdallers beat Cannontown Emmets of Termonfeckin in the final of the Second Division Championship, by 1–04 to 0–02.

In 1951 Dowdallshill defeated Oliver Plunketts of Drogheda by 4–04 to 1–08 in the replayed final of the Louth Junior championship. The following year they reached the Senior Championship final for the second time in their history, losing to Dundalk Gaels at the Dundalk Athletic Grounds on a scoreline of 0–08 to 1–02. Their line-out on final day was: Seán McGarrity (goal), John Murray, Pat Mulligan, Tommy Carroll, Willie Kinney, Frank Kinney, Pat Boyle, Owen Rogers (Capt.), James Campbell, Henry O'Connor, James Murphy, Paddy Kirk, Tom Fitzgerald, Arthur Boyle, Paul Curran. Subs Used: Seán Hearty and Paddy Connolly.

In 1953 the club celebrated the opening of their new clubrooms on the Racecourse Road. Home matches had hitherto been played in a field opposite Dundalk Racecourse, but in the late 1950s a larger site on the Newry Road was purchased and named St. Brigid's Park. The ground was officially opened in 1959, with Louth defeating Cavan 3–07 to 2–08 in a challenge match on 13 September.

The venue staged its first county senior final in 1960, which saw Ardee St Mary's defeat Naomh Mhuire of Drogheda. As of 2023, the showpiece occasion of Louth football had been played at St. Brigid's Park twenty times. Many inter-county matches have also been held at the venue, notably the 1987 All-Ireland Senior Hurling Championship semi-final between Antrim and Kilkenny.

The Athletics side of the club – which is no longer active – was particularly strong between the 1940s and 1960s, winning many individual and team titles at national level. Notable runners included Pat McInerney, Pa Kerley, Frank Byrne, Kevin and Peter Lynch, Johnny Murphy, Willie Curtis, Ronnie Roche, Tommy Hanratty, Gerry McShane (leading Sprinter in Ireland) and Peter McArdle (four-mile national Champion who competed in the Marathon at the 1964 Olympic Games).

In 1960, members began their tradition of an annual Christmas morning run from the clubrooms to St. Oliver's nursing home in Dundalk, which continues to the present day.

In 1965, Dowdallshill's minor team qualified for the county final at Castlebellingham, losing out to Ardee minors on a scoreline of 3–10 to 2–04.

In 2003, the club won the Junior treble of Championship, League and Kevin Mullen Shield, twenty-three years after Naomh Máirtín had been the last team to achieve this feat in 1980. They then competed in the 2004 Louth Intermediate Championship. Their first ever win at the intermediate grade was achieved by defeating Seán O'Mahony's. However, league results saw the team return to Junior football in 2005.

Clubhouse

In 2005, the club won the Junior championship for the second time in three years with a victory over St Kevin's.

Dowdallshill reached the semi-finals of the Junior Championship in 2008, losing out to eventual runners-up Lann Léire. That year, GAA president Nickey Brennan officially opened the club's new expanded facilities at St Brigid's Park.

The club celebrated 125 years of activity in 2011.

At underage level, Dowdallshill combines with fellow Dundalk side Seán O'Mahony's. Together they enter teams in competitions under the banner of 'The Hill/O'Mahonys'.

As of 2023, Dowdallshill currently competes in the Louth Junior championship and Division 3B of the county's football leagues. Gerry Curran will manage the footballers in 2023.

== Inter-county players ==
Past players who have played inter-county football include:

- Richie Barry – member of the Louth team that won the Leinster Under-21 Football Championship in 1970, beating Offaly in Croke Park. Played at midfield in club's defeat of St Patrick's in Junior Championship Final of same year. Played for Louth in 1973 Leinster Senior Football Championship win against Dublin.
- Jack Curran – member of Louth team in 1970 Leinster Under-21 Football Championship. Centre half-back in Junior Championship Final win over St Patrick's.
- Oliver Crewe – former Armagh footballer. Played in final of 1974 All-Ireland Senior Club Football Championship.
- Enda Hughes – member of club's Junior Championship winning sides in 2003 and 2005. Played in O'Byrne Cup and National League for the Louth senior team during 2004.
- Pat McMahon – Goalkeeper on county minor team that won Leinster Minor Championship of 1951.
- Patrick McMahon – won Leinster Minor Championship medal at full-forward in Louth's 1953 defeat of Kildare. Won Kildare Senior Football Championship medal while stationed at Curragh Camp. Held the rank of Army Lieutenant colonel and was appointed Commanding Officer of Irish UNIFIL troops in 1988.
- Johnny Murphy – captain of Dowdallshill side that won the 1934 Second Division Championship. and MacArdle Cup. Played for Louth in finals of 1932 Leinster Minor Championship and 1941 Leinster Junior Championship.
- Larry Murphy – Brother of Johnny. Midfield on county side that won the 1940 All-Ireland Minor Football Championship. Won a Senior Championship medal with Dundalk Gaels in 1945.
- Donal O'Callaghan – played left half-back on Louth team defeated by Dublin in 1998 Leinster Minor Championship quarter-final.
- Thomas Quigley - right-half back in Louth's 1932 Leinster Minor Football final defeat to Laois.
- Jim Tiernan – right-corner back in 1931 All-Ireland Minor Football Championship final defeat to Kerry. Won All-Ireland Junior Championship medal with Louth in 1932.
- Larry Waller – centre-half back on Louth team that won the 1936 All-Ireland Minor Football Championship. Later won several Louth Senior Championships with Dundalk Young Irelands.

== Honours ==
- Louth Junior Football Championship (5): 1935, 1951, 1970, 2003, 2005
- Louth Junior A Football League (3): 1934, 1989, 2003
- Louth Junior 2A Football Championship (2): 1934, 1939
- Avonmore/Kevin Mullen Shield (2): 1989, 2003
- Kevin Mullen Plate (1): 2011
- Louth Junior 2 Football League Division 4C (1): 2009
- Donagh Cup (2): 1998, 1999
