= 1933 All-Ireland Minor Football Championship =

Gaelic football competition

Championship details

All-Ireland Champions
- Winning team: Kerry (3rd win)

All-Ireland Finalists
- Losing team: Mayo

Provincial Champions
- Munster: Kerry
- Leinster: Dublin
- Ulster: Antrim
- Connacht: Mayo

The 1933 All-Ireland Minor Football Championship was the fifth staging of the All-Ireland Minor Football Championship, the Gaelic Athletic Association's premier inter-county Gaelic football tournament for boys under the age of 18.

Kerry entered as defending champions.

On 24 September 1933, Kerry won the championship following a 4-1 to 0-9 defeat of Mayo in the All-Ireland final. This was their third All-Ireland title overall and their third in succession.

== Results ==
=== All-Ireland Minor Football Championship ===
Semi-finals

Final

24 September 1933 Final	Kerry	4-01 - 0-09	Mayo	Croke Park, Dublin
