= 1932 All-Ireland Minor Football Championship =

Gaelic football competition

Championship details

All-Ireland Champions
- Winning team: Kerry (2nd win)

All-Ireland Finalists
- Losing team: Laois

Provincial Champions
- Munster: Kerry
- Leinster: Laois
- Ulster: Antrim
- Connacht: Galway

The 1932 All-Ireland Minor Football Championship was the fourth staging of the All-Ireland Minor Football Championship, the Gaelic Athletic Association's premier inter-county Gaelic football tournament for boys under the age of 18.

Kerry entered as defending champions.

On 18 September 1932, Kerry won the championship following a 3-8 to 1-3 defeat of Laois in the All-Ireland final. This was their second All-Ireland title overall and their second in succession.

== Results ==
=== Final ===
7 August 1932

Laois	3-02–1-07	Louth

Croke Park, Dublin
Referee: F. Conlan (Kildare)

GK	1	Eddie Roche (Knockbeg College)
RCB	2	Matt Hyland (The Heath)
FB	3	William Troy (The Heath)
LCB	4	J. Nolan (Emo)
RHB	5	Mickey Fanning (Ballyroan)
CHB	6	Joe Hinchin (Abbeyleix) (c)
LHB	7	Séamus Short (Stradbally)
MF	8	Syd Harkins (Portlaoise)
MF	9	Bill Delaney (Stradbally)
RHF	10	M. McGough (Belcamp College)
CHF	11	J. J. Delaney (Belcamp College)
LHF	12	J. J. O'Reilly (Ballybrittas)
RCF	13	Joe Meehan (Knockbeg College)
FF	14	Tom Keogh (Ballybrittas)
LCF	15	Matt Cahill (Abbeyleix)

GK	1	Frank Devlin (Clan na Gael)
RCB	2	William Hearty (Clan na Gael)
FB	3	Joe Boyle (Cooley Kickhams)
LCB	4	Johnny Murphy (Dowdallshill)
RHB	5	Thomas Quigley (Dowdallshill)
CHB	6	Kevin McArdle (Cooley Kickhams)
LHB	7	James McGrath (Cooley Kickhams)
MF	8	Pat McCann (Wolfe Tones)
MF	9	Matt Bromley (Clan na Gael)
RHF	10	Arthur Dempsey (St Mary's)
CHF	11	John Gore (Castle Emmets)
LHF	12	Patrick Cluskey (Wolfe Tones)
RCF	13	James Fearon (Cooley Kickhams)
FF	14	Mick Callaghan (Cooley Kickhams)
LCF	15	Anthony Lawless (Dundalk Gaels)

=== All-Ireland Minor Football Championship ===
Semi-Finals

14 August 1932	Laois	2-03 - 1-03	Antrim	Athletic Grounds, Dundalk

Final

18 September 1932	Kerry	3-08 - 1-03	Laois	St. Cronan's Park, Roscrea
