= 1931 All-Ireland Minor Football Championship =

Gaelic football competition

Championship details

All-Ireland Champions
- Winning team: Kerry (1st win)
- Captain: Jimmy O'Gorman

All-Ireland Finalists
- Losing team: Louth
- Captain: John Harlin

Provincial Champions
- Munster: Kerry
- Leinster: Louth
- Ulster: Tyrone
- Connacht: Mayo

The 1931 All-Ireland Minor Football Championship was the third staging of the All-Ireland Minor Football Championship, the Gaelic Athletic Association's premier inter-county Gaelic football tournament for boys under the age of 18.

Dublin entered as defending champions, however, they were beaten by Louth in the Leinster quarter-final.

On 20 September 1931, Kerry won the championship following a 3–04 to 0–04 defeat of Louth in the All-Ireland final. This was their first All-Ireland title.

The final had been arranged for 6 September but Kerry failed to fulfil the fixture. The match was subsequently rescheduled to be played a fortnight later, with Louth awarded home advantage.

== Results ==
=== Leinster Minor Football Championship ===
9 August 1931 Final	Louth	1–05 - 0–03	Wexford	Croke Park
	J. Harlin 1-0, G. Dillon 0-2, J. Caffrey, P. Collier, A. Woods 0-1 each		A. Kealy, J. Morris, P. Quinn 0-1 each

GK	1	Peter McDonnell (Ardee minors)
RCB	2	Jim Tiernan (Dowdallshill)
FB	3	Gerard Hearty (Clan na Gael)
LCB	4	Jimmy Beirne (Ardee minors)
RHB	5	Larry Dyas (Wolfe Tones)
CHB	6	Chris Marley (Dromiskin Unknowns)
LHB	7	Jack Kelly (O'Connells)
MF	8	James Caffrey (O'Connells)
MF	9	Kevin McArdle (Cooley Kickhams)
RHF	10	Peter Collier (O'Connells)
CHF	11	Ambrose Woods (Cooley Kickhams)
LHF	12	Arthur Dempsey (Ardee minors)
RCF	13	Gerard Dillon (Clan na Gael)
FF	14	John Harlin (Ardee minors) (c)
LCF	15	Gerard Watters (Mountpleasant Lodge Rovers)

GK	1	G. Howlin (Sarsfields)
RCB	2	F. Sutherland (Sarsfields)
FB	3	T. Merriman (Starlights)
LCB	4	J. Forde (Gorey Blues)
RHB	5	M. O'Connor (Sarsfields)
CHB	6	L. Byrne (Starlights)
LHB	7	W. Connolly (Starlights)
MF	8	J. Quinn (Starlights)
MF	9	M. Swan (Ballyhogue)
RHF	10	E. Foley (Sarsfields)
CHF	11	A. Travers (Gorey Blues)
LHF	12	S. Carroll (Sarsfields)
RCF	13	J. Morris (Sarsfields)
FF	14	P. Quinn (Starlights)
LCF	15	A. Kealy (Gorey Parnells)

=== Ulster Minor Football Championship ===
Tyrone	0–07 - 0–04	Armagh

=== Connacht Minor Football Championship ===
Mayo	2–07 - 0–03	Sligo

=== Munster Minor Football Championship ===
Kerry	3–06 - 0–07	Tipperary

=== All-Ireland Minor Football Championship ===
Semi-Finals

30 August 1931	Kerry	3–11 - 0–02	Mayo	Tuam Stadium

23 August 1931	Louth	2–06 - 1–07	Tyrone	Athletic Grounds, Dundalk

Final (Gaelic Grounds, Drogheda)

20 September 1931

Kerry	3–04 – 0–04	Louth
(HT: 2–01 - 0–01)
Gls: Healy (1-0), P.J. O'Sullivan (1-0), Chute (1-0); Pts: McMahon (0-02), Murphy (0-01) P.J. O'Sullivan (0-01)		Pts: Collier (0-02), Caffrey (0-01), Dempsey (0-01)

Referee: Patrick Fearon (Armagh)
Attendance: 5,000

GK	1	Brendan Reidy (Austin Stacks)
RCB	2	Frank O'Neill (Austin Stacks)
FB	3	Paddy Walsh (St Mary's)
LCB	4	Ned O'Mahony (Firies)
RHB	5	D.J. McCarthy (John Mitchel's)
CHB	6	Jack O'Keeffe (Dr Crokes)
LHB	7	Tim O'Sullivan (Austin Stacks)
MF	8	Jimmy O'Gorman (Austin Stacks) (c)
MF	9	Paddy McMahon (John Mitchel's)
RHF	10	Tommy Murphy (John Mitchel's)
CHF	11	P.J. O'Sullivan (St Mary's)
LHF	12	Michael Buckley (Tarbert)
RCF	13	Ted Chute (Listowel Emmets)
FF	14	Charlie O'Sullivan (Kerins O'Rahilly's)
LCF	15	Bernard Healy (Kerins O'Rahilly's)

GK	1	Peter McDonnell (Ardee minors)
RCB	2	Jim Tiernan (Dowdallshill)
FB	3	Gerard Hearty (Clan na Gael)
LCB	4	Jimmy Beirne (Ardee minors)
RHB	5	Larry Dyas (Wolfe Tones)
CHB	6	Chris Marley (Dromiskin Unknowns)
LHB	7	James Fearon (Cooley Kickhams)
MF	8	James Caffrey (O'Connells)
MF	9	Kevin McArdle (Cooley Kickhams)
RHF	10	Peter Collier (O'Connells)
CHF	11	Arthur Bradley (Ardee minors)
LHF	12	Arthur Dempsey (Ardee minors)
RCF	13	Jack Kelly (O'Connells)
FF	14	John Harlin (Ardee minors) (c)
LCF	15	Gerard Watters (Mountpleasant Lodge Rovers)
