= 2025 All-Ireland Minor Football Championship =

Gaelic football contest

All-Ireland Minor Football Championship 2025
Championship details
- Dates: 21 March - July 2025
- Teams: 31

All-Ireland Champions
- Winning team: Tyrone (10th win)
- Captain: Pádraig Donaghy
- Manager: Gerard Donnelly

All-Ireland Finalists
- Losing team: Kerry
- Captain: Gearóid White
- Manager: Wayne Quillinan

Provincial Champions
- Munster: Kerry
- Leinster: Offaly
- Ulster: Tyrone
- Connacht: Roscommon

Championship statistics

The 2025 All-Ireland Minor Football Championship was the 94th staging of the All-Ireland Minor Football Championship since its establishment by the Gaelic Athletic Association in 1929. The championship ran from 21 March to July 2025.

Derry were the defending champions, however, they were defeated by Down in the Ulster Championship.

The All-Ireland Final was played on 6 July 2025 at St Conleth's Park in Newbridge, between Tyrone and Kerry. Tyrone won the match by 1-16 to 1-15 with a dramatic last minute winner from Diarmuid Martin.

== Format ==
A vote at GAA Congress in September 2023 approved the introduction of tiered knockout competitions as part of the All-Ireland Minor Football Championship. Tier 1 features the four provincial champions playing the four provincial runners up in the All-Ireland quarter-finals. Those pairings are decided on a provincial rota system initially determined by Central Council and provincial finals cannot be repeated at the quarter-final stage.

The tier 2 knockout competition comprises 11 teams: one from Munster, four teams from both Leinster and Ulster and two from Connacht. Leinster and Ulster are each represented by their two losing semi-finalists as well as two beaten quarter-finalists. The third and fourth placed teams in Connacht are also included. The semi-finalists in Leinster and Ulster along with the third-placed team in Connacht receive byes to the quarter-finals where they are joined by three preliminary quarter-final winners.

In tier 3, there are 13 teams made up of five from Leinster, three from both Munster and Ulster and two from Connacht. In Connacht's case, their fifth-placed team play London for a place in the quarter-finals.

The tiered All-Ireland series runs over an eight-week period from mid-May to the start of July.

== Connacht Minor Football Championship ==
=== Connacht Group Stage ===
==== Connacht Group Table ====
Pos	Team	Pld	W	D	L	SF	SA	Diff	Pts	Qualification
1	Roscommon	4	4	0	0	83	57	+26	8	Advance to Final
2	Galway	4	3	0	1	83	71	+12	6	Advance to Semi-final
3	Mayo	4	2	0	2	82	73	+9	4	Advance to Semi-final
4	Leitrim	4	1	0	3	69	82	-13	2	
5	Sligo	4	0	0	4	57	91	-34	0	

==== Connacht Group Stage Results ====
21 March 2025 Round 1	Roscommon	0-20 - 0-08	Sligo	Roscommon
17:30				Stadium: King & Moffatt Dr Hyde Park

21 March 2025 Round 1	Leitrim	2-11 - 3-19	Galway	Cloone
19:00

28 March 2025 Round 2	Mayo	0-15 - 0-10	Leitrim	Ballina
17:30				Stadium: James Stephens Park

28 March 2025 Round 2	Galway	0-12 - 0-15	Roscommon	Tuam
17:30				Stadium: Tuam Stadium

4 April 2025 Round 3	Sligo	0-18 - 1-17	Galway	Kilcoyne Park
18:15

4 April 2025 Round 3	Roscommon	4-15 - 3-09	Mayo	Roscommon
18:15				Stadium: King & Moffatt Dr Hyde Park

11 April 2025 Round 4	Mayo	3-19 - 1-10	Sligo	Castlebar
18:30				Stadium: Hastings MacHale Park

11 April 2025 Round 4	Leitrim	1-16 - 2-15	Roscommon	Drumshanbo
18:30				Stadium: Shane McGettigan Park

18 April 2025 Round 5	Sligo	2-12 - 4-11	Leitrim	Kilcoyne Park
18:30

18 April 2025 Round 5	Galway	3-14 - 3-12	Mayo	Tuam
18:30				Stadium: Tuam Stadium

=== Connacht Knockout Stage ===
==== Connacht Semi-Final ====
2 May 2025 Semi-final	Galway	0-15 - 3-15	Mayo	Castlebar
18:30				Stadium: Hastings MacHale Park

=== Connacht Final ===
9 May 2025 Final	Roscommon	2-14 - 1-15	Mayo	Castlebar
18:30				Stadium: Hastings MacHale Park

== Leinster Minor Football Championship ==
=== Leinster Group 1 ===
==== Leinster Group 1 Table ====
Pos	Team	Pld	W	D	L	SF	SA	Diff	Pts	Qualification
1	Dublin	3	3	0	0	57	45	+12	6	Advance to Semi-finals
2	Louth	3	2	0	1	69	55	+14	4	Advance to Quarter-finals
3	Offaly	3	1	0	2	57	72	-15	2	Advance to Preliminary Quarter-finals
4	Laois	3	0	0	3	37	48	-11	0	

==== Leinster Group 1 Results ====
29 March 2025 Round 1	Offaly	3-07 - 5-10	Dublin	Tullamore
12:30				Stadium: Glenisk O'Connor Park

29 March 2025 Round 1	Laois	0-12 - 1-15	Louth	Portlaoise
14:00				Stadium: Laois Hire O'Moore Park

10 April 2025 Round 2	Louth	2-26 - 2-17	Offaly	Páirc Baile Fiach
19:30

10 April 2025 Round 2	Dublin	1-09 - 1-07	Laois	Dublin
19:30				Stadium: Parnell Park

15 April 2025 Round 3	Offaly	1-15 - 2-09	Laois	Faithful Fields
19:30

17 April 2025 Round 3	Dublin	3-11 - 1-16	Louth	Dublin
19:30				Stadium: Parnell Park

=== Leinster Group 2 ===
==== Leinster Group 2 Table ====
Pos	Team	Pld	W	D	L	SF	SA	Diff	Pts	Qualification
1	Kildare	3	2	1	0	59	48	+11	5	Advance to Semi-finals
2	Meath	3	2	0	1	62	52	+10	4	Advance to Quarter-finals
3	Westmeath	3	1	0	2	50	59	-9	2	Advance to Preliminary Quarter-finals
4	Longford	3	0	1	2	48	60	-12	1	

==== Leinster Group 2 Results ====
29 March 2025 Round 1	Meath	4-10 - 0-10	Westmeath	Navan
14:00				Stadium: Páirc Tailteann

29 March 2025 Round 1	Longford	0-14 - 2-08	Kildare	Glennon Brothers Pearse Park
14:00

10 April 2025 Round 2	Westmeath	3-15 - 2-09	Longford	Kinnegad Grounds
19:30

10 April 2025 Round 2	Kildare	3-14 - 1-15	Meath	Newbridge
19:30				Stadium: Cedral St Conleth's Park

17 April 2025 Round 3	Kildare	0-22 1-13	Westmeath	Newbridge
19:30				Stadium: Cedral St Conleth's Park

17 April 2025 Round 3	Longford	3-10 - 1-19	Meath	Clonguish
19:30

=== Leinster Group 3 ===
==== Leinster Group 3 Table ====
Pos	Team	Pld	W	D	L	SF	SA	Diff	Pts	Qualification
1	Carlow	2	2	0	0	37	29	+8	4	Advance to Preliminary Quarter-finals
2	Wicklow	2	1	0	1	31	37	-6	2	Advance to Preliminary Quarter-finals
3	Wexford	2	0	0	2	31	33	-2	0	

==== Leinster Group 3 Results ====
30 March 2025 Round 1	Wicklow	0-17 - 1-13	Wexford	Aughrim
14:00				Stadium: Echelon Park

10 April 2025 Round 2	Carlow	3-12 - 2-08	Wicklow	Netwatch Cullen Park
19:30

17 April 2025 Round 3	Wexford	1-12 - 2-10	Carlow	Enniscorthy
19:30				Stadium: St Patrick's Park

=== Leinster Knockout Stage ===
Preliminary Quarter-Finals
Offaly	3-20
Wicklow	2-13
Westmeath	2-12
Carlow	2-09

Quarter-Finals
Meath	2-14
Offaly	4-11
Louth	3-16
Westmeath	3-12

Semi-Finals
Offaly	4-09
Kildare	1-16
Dublin	1-08
Louth	2-17

Minor Leinster Final
Offaly	2-20
Louth	3-14

==== Leinster Preliminary Quarter-Finals ====
24 April 2025 Pre. quarter-final	Offaly	3-20 - 2-13	Wicklow	Faithful Fields
19:30

24 April 2025 Pre. quarter-final	Westmeath	2-12 - 2-09	Carlow	Netwatch Cullen Park
19:30

==== Leinster Quarter-Finals ====
1 May 2024 Quarter-final	Meath	2-14 - 4-11	Offaly	Navan
18:30				Stadium: Páirc Tailteann

1 May 2025 Quarter-final	Louth	3-16 - 3-12	Westmeath	Páirc Baile Fiach
19:30

==== Leinster Semi-Finals ====
7 May 2025 Semi-final	Offaly	4-09 - 1-16	Kildare	Tullamore
				Stadium: Glenisk O'Connor Park

7 May 2025 Semi-final	Dublin	1-08 - 2-17	Louth	Naul
17:30

==== Leinster Final ====
19 May 2025 Final	Offaly	2-20 - 3-14	Louth	Newbridge
19:30	T. Furey 1-6 (5f), J. Ryan 0-8 (4 2pf), D. Dunne 1-1, C. McNamee, E. Maher (2p) 0-2, D. Stewart 0-1		C. Kelly 0-9 (3 2pf, 2f), C. McQuillan 1-2 (pen), O. Reidy 1-1, J. Martin 1-0, M. McGlew 0-2	Stadium: Cedral St Conleth's Park; Referee: James Foley (Carlow)

GK	1	Jack Ryan (Doon)
RCB	2	Cormac Farrell (Edenderry)
FB	3	Tomás Carroll (Erin Rovers)
LCB	4	Caden O'Beirne (Tullamore)
RHB	5	Patrick Duffy (Tullamore)
CHB	6	Tadhg Kelly (Kilclonfert)
LHB	7	Eoin Rouse (Tullamore)
MF	8	Éamon Maher (Ferbane)
MF	9	Charlie Duffy (Edenderry)
RHF	10	Cathal Weldon (Bracknagh)
CHF	11	Dylan Dunne (Clara)
LHF	12	Aaron Daly (Clonbullogue)
RCF	13	Tony Furey (Edenderry)
FF	14	Cian McNamee (Rhode) (c)
LCF	15	Ruairí Woods (Belmont)
Substitutes:
	16	Darragh Stewart (Tullamore) for Weldon
	18	Cian Duffy (Doon) for Daly

GK	1	Senon Connolly (Roche Emmets)
RCB	2	Finn McEneaney (St Joseph's)
FB	3	Ciarán Titley (Stabannon Parnells)
LCB	4	Rian Hickey (Mattock Rangers)
RHB	5	Michael McGlew (St Fechin's)
CHB	6	Tadhg Devaney (Glyde Rangers)
LHB	7	Conor Marron (St Mochta's)
MF	8	Tom Maguire (Westerns)
MF	9	Cillian McQuillan (Naomh Fionnbarra)
RHF	10	Oisín Reidy (St Joseph's)
CHF	11	Andrew O'Reilly (Naomh Fionnbarra) (c)
LHF	12	Niall McCreesh (Naomh Fionnbarra)
RCF	13	Cian Rooney (St Mary's)
FF	14	Jack Martin (Westerns)
LCF	15	Connell Kelly (Dreadnots)
Substitutes
	16	Conal Mannion (St Kevin's) for McCreesh
	17	Senan Hoey (St Bride's) for Rooney

== Munster Minor Football Championship ==
=== Munster Phase 1 ===
==== Munster Phase 1 Group Table ====
Pos	Team	Pld	W	D	L	SF	SA	Diff	Pts	Qualification
1	Clare	3	2	0	1	60	42	+18	4	Advance to Phase 1 Final
2	Tipperary	3	2	0	1	51	44	+7	4	Advance to Phase 1 Final
3	Limerick	3	2	0	1	52	48	+4	4	
4	Waterford	3	0	0	3	35	64	-29	0	

==== Munster Phase 1 Group Stage Results ====
7 April 2025 Round 1	Tipperary	1-16 - 1-06	Waterford	Fethard
				Stadium: Fethard Town Park; Referee: Timmy McGrath (Limerick)

7 April 2025 Round 1	Clare	1-17 - 1-09	Limerick	Quilty
				Stadium: Páirc Naomh Mhuire; Referee: Evan Horan (Kerry)

14 April 2025 Round 2	Waterford	1-10 - 1-22	Clare	Lemybrien
				Referee: Brian Crowley (Cork)

14 April 2025 Round 2	Limerick	2-14 - 1-12	Tipperary	Rathkeale
				Stadium: Mick Neville Park; Referee: Ciarán Murphy (Cork)

28 April 2025 Round 3	Tipperary	1-14 - 1-12	Clare	Templetuohy
				Referee: Jack Bray (Waterford)

28 April 2025 Round 3	Limerick	2-14 - 1-10	Waterford	Rathekeale
				Stadium: Mick Neville Park; Referee: Gary Twomey (Clare)

==== Munster Phase 1 Final ====
5 May 2024 Final	Tipperary	1-16 - 1-14 (a.e.t.)	Clare	Thurles
				Stadium: FBD Semple Stadium; Referee: James Regan (Cork)

=== Munster Knockout Stage ===
==== Munster Quarter-Final ====
5 May 2025 Quarter-final	Cork	2-08 - 2-18	Kerry	Cork
				Stadium: Páirc Uí Rinn; Referee: Timmy McGrath (Limerick)

==== Munster Semi-Finals ====
Semi-Finals		Minor Munster Final
Clare	1-06
Kerry	3-16	Kerry	0-18
Tipperary	0-20	Cork	0-09
Cork (a.e.t.)	2-17

12 May 2025 Semi-final	Clare	1-06 - 3-16	Kerry	Quilty
19:00				Stadium: Páirc Naomh Mhuire; Referee: Ciarán Murphy (Cork)

12 May 2025 Semi-final	Tipperary	0-20 - 2-17 (a.e.t.)	Cork	Thurles
19:00				Stadium: FBD Semple Stadium; Referee: Evan Horan (Kerry)

==== Munster Final ====
23 May 2025 Final	Kerry	0-18 - 0-09	Cork	Tralee
19:30				Stadium: Austin Stack Park

== Ulster Minor Football Championship ==
=== Ulster Qualification ===
==== Ulster Preliminary Round ====
12 April 2025 Preliminary Round	Monaghan	2-11 - 0-13	Down	Clones
				Stadium: St Tiernach's Park; Referee: James Lewis

==== Ulster Round 1 ====
19 April 2025 Round 1	Tyrone	2-19 - 0-03	Fermanagh	Omagh
				Stadium: O'Neills Healy Park; Referee: Oisín McKee

19 April 2025 Round 1	Donegal	3-10 - 3-08	Monaghan	Letterkenny
				Referee: Eoin Murphy

19 April 2025 Round 1	Armagh	2-09 - 0-10	Antrim	Crossmaglen
				Referee: Mark Turley

19 April 2025 Round 1	Cavan	1-12 1-07	Derry	Cavan
				Stadium: Kingspan Breffni Park; Referee: Shane Murphy

==== Ulster Qualifiers Round 1 ====
26 April 2025 Qualifiers Round 1	Fermanagh	0-11 - 3-15	Derry	Roslea
				Stadium: Shamrock Park; Referee: Enda Mallon

==== Ulster Round 2 ====
3 May 2025 Round 2	Tyrone	0-19 - 0-13	Cavan	Omagh
				Stadium: O'Neills Healy Park; Referee: Shane Murphy

3 May 2025 Round 2	Armagh	1-15 - 1-21	Donegal	Armagh
				Stadium: BOX-IT Athletic Grounds; Referee: Barry McMenamin

==== Ulster Qualifiers Round 2 ====
3 May 2025 Qualifiers Round 2	Monaghan	5-21 - 1-19	Antrim	Clones
				Stadium: St Tiernach's Park; Referee: Neil McGeown

3 May 2025 Qualifiers Round 2	Down	1-11 - 0-12	Derry	Downpatrick
				Referee: Christopher Brady

=== Ulster Knockout Stage ===
Quarter-Finals
Cavan	1-13
Down	0-10
Monaghan	2-15
Armagh	2-07

Semi-Finals
Cavan	1-17
Donegal	0-15
Tyrone	2-20
Monaghan	3-12

Minor Ulster Final
Cavan	1-08
Tyrone	2-11

==== Ulster Quarter-Finals ====
10 May 2025 Quarter-Final	Cavan	1-13 - 0-10	Down	Cavan
				Stadium: Kingspan Breffni Park; Referee: James Lewis

11 May 2025 Quarter-Final	Monaghan	2-15 - 2-07	Armagh	Clones
				Stadium: St Tiernach's Park; Referee: Margaret Farrelly

==== Ulster Semi-Finals ====
17 May 2025 Semi-Final	Cavan	1-17 - 0-15	Donegal	Cavan
19:00				Stadium: Kingspan Breffni Park; Referee: Enda Mallon

17 May 2025 Semi-Final	Tyrone	2-20 - 3-12	Monaghan	Omagh
19:00				Stadium: O'Neills Healy Park; Referee: Eoin Murphy

==== Ulster Final ====
25 May 2025 Final	Cavan	1-08 - 2-11	Tyrone	Enniskillen
				Stadium: Brewster Park; Referee: Conall Roberts

== All-Ireland Minor Football Championship ==
Quarter-Finals		Semi-Finals		All-Ireland Minor Football Final
Offaly	4-07
Mayo	3-13	Mayo	3-10
Kerry	0-14	Kerry	1-19
Cavan	1-09			Kerry	1-15
Tyrone	1-21			Tyrone	1-16
Cork	1-12	Tyrone	2-12
Roscommon	1-19	Roscommon	1-08
Louth	2-15

=== All-Ireland quarter-finals ===
7 June 2025 Quarter-final	Kerry	0-14 - 1-09	Cavan	Portlaoise
12:00				Stadium: Laois Hire O'Moore Park; Referee: Niall Quinn

7 June 2025 Quarter-final	Tyrone	1-21 - 1-12	Cork	Portlaoise
13:45				Stadium: Laois Hire O'Moore Park; Referee: Christopher Ryan

7 June 2025 Quarter-final	Roscommon	1-19 - 2-15	Louth	Cavan
19:00				Stadium: Kingspan Breffni Park; Referee: Pat Clarke

8 June 2025 Quarter-final	Offaly	4-07 - 3-13	Mayo	Roscommon
15:00				Stadium: Dr Hyde Park; Referee: Alan Coyne

=== All-Ireland semi-finals ===
22 June 2025 Semi-final	Tyrone	2-12 - 1-08	Roscommon	Breffni Park, Cavan
13.30				Referee: C Maguire

22 June 2025 Semi-final	Mayo	3-10 - 1-19	Kerry	Cusack Park, Ennis
15.30				Referee: C Dourneen

=== All-Ireland final ===
6 July 2025 Final	Tyrone	1-16 - 1-15	Kerry	St Conleth's Park
13:30 IST (UTC+1)				Referee: Thomas Murphy (Galway)

== Championship Statistics ==
=== Top Scorers ===
Overall

Rank	Player	County	Tally	Total	Matches	Average
1						
2						
3						
4						
5						
6						
7						
8						
9						
10						

In A Single Game

Rank	Player	Club	Tally	Total	Opposition
1					
2					
3					
4					
5					
6					
7					
8					
9					
10					

== See also ==
- 2025 All-Ireland Minor Football Championship Tier 2
- 2025 All-Ireland Minor Football Championship Tier 3
