= 2024 Cork Premier Intermediate Football Championship =

Annual Gaelic football competition season

- Dates: 27 July - 3 November 2024
- Teams: 12
- Sponsor: McCarthy Insurance Group
- Champions: Kilshannig (1st title); Colm O'Shea (captain); Éanna O'Hanlon (captain); Denis Reen (manager)
- Runners-up: Aghabullogue; John Corkery (captain); Ray Keane (manager)
- Relegated: Ilen Rovers

Tournament statistics
- Matches played: 25
- Goals scored: 49 (1.96 per match)
- Points scored: 534 (21.36 per match)
- Top scorer(s): Chris Óg Jones (6-27)

The 2024 Cork Premier Intermediate Football Championship was the 19th staging of the Cork Premier Intermediate Football Championship since its establishment by the Cork County Board in 2020. The draw for the group stage placings took place on 14 December 2023. The championship ran from 27 July to 3 November 2024.

The final, a replay, was played on 3 November 2024 at SuperValu Páirc Uí Chaoimh in Cork, between Kilshannig and Aghabullogue, in what was their first ever meeting in a final in this grade. Kilshannig won the match by 2-10 to 1-09 to claim their first ever championship title.

Iveleary's Chris Óg Jones was the championship's top scorer with 6-27.

== Team changes ==
=== To Championship ===
Relegated from the Cork Senior A Football Championship

- Ilen Rovers

Promoted from the Cork Intermediate A Football Championship

- Aghabullogue

=== From Championship ===
Promoted to the Cork Senior A Football Championship

- Cill na Martra

Relegated to the Cork Intermediate A Football Championship

- Na Piarsaigh

== Group A ==
=== Group A table ===
Semi-finalists Quarter-finalists Relegation playoff

Team	Matches				Score			Pts
Team	Pld	W	D	L	For	Against	Diff	Pts
Aghabullogue	3	3	0	0	41	30	11	6
Iveleary	3	2	0	1	54	27	27	4
Aghada	3	1	0	2	43	40	3	2
Ilen Rovers	3	0	0	3	25	66	-41	0

=== Group A results ===
28 July 2024 Round 1	Ilen Rovers	0-05 - 4-15	Iveleary	Sam Maguire Park
	M Sheehy 0-3, P O’Driscoll, D MacEoin 0-1 each.	Report	C Óg Jones 2-8 (0-7 f, 1-0 pen), A O’Donovan 1-1, B O’Leary 1-0, I Jones, L Kearney 0-2 each, B Cronin, T Roberts 0-1 each.

28 July 2024 Round 1	Aghada	0-10 - 0-13	Aghabullogue	Páirc Uí Chonchúir
	T Hartnett (0-3), A Berry, C Hegarty (0-1 free) and D Creedon (0-2 each), D Byrne (0-1).	Report	D Thompson (0-6, 0-1M, 0-2 frees), M Bradley (0-2, 0-1 free), A O’Sullivan (free), B O’Sullivan, E O’Sullivan, J Corkery and P O’Sullivan (0-1 each).

17 August 2024 Round 2	Iveleary	1-11 - 0-07	Aghada	Ballyanley Grounds
	C Óg Jones 1-6 (0-4 f), B Cronin 0-2, S O'Riordan I Jones, B Murphy 0-1 each.	Report	C Hegarty 0-4 f, D Byrne 0-3 (0-1 f).

17 August 2024 Round 2	Aghabullogue	1-10 - 0-07	Ilen Rovers	Ballinacarriga Grounds
	E O’Sullivan 1-2, D Thompson (0-2 frees), J Corkery, L Casey, M Bradley 0-2 each.	Report	D Mac Eoin 0-5 (0-3 frees), A O’Driscoll, Peter O’Driscoll 0-1 each.

14 September 2024 Round 3	Iveleary	0-13 - 1-12	Aghabullogue	Jack Fitzgerald Memorial Park
	C Óg Jones 0-6 (0-3 f), B Cronin (0-1 f), S O’Riordan 0-2 each, S O’Leary, T Roberts, I Jones 0-1 each.	Report	M Bradley 0-5 (0-1 f), L Casey 1-1, E O’Sullivan 0-3 (0-2 f), B O’Sullivan, C Gillespie, P O’Sullivan 0-1 each.

14 September 2024 Round 3	Ilen Rovers	1-10 - 5-11	Aghada	Brinny Sportsfield
	D Mac Eoin 0-6 (0-1 f, 0-1 45), S O’Shea 1-0, M Sheehy 0-2, Peter O’Driscoll, D Ryan 0-1 each.	Report	A Berry 3-1 (1-0 penalty), C Hegarty 0-4 (0-2 f, 0-1 45), D Creedon 0-3 (0-2 f), T Hartnett, J O’Hanlon 1-0 each, D Phelan 0-2, P O’Neill 0-1.

== Group B ==
=== Group B table ===
Quarter-finalists

Team	Matches				Score			Pts
Team	Pld	W	D	L	For	Against	Diff	Pts
Naomh Abán	3	2	1	0	38	33	5	4
Bantry Blues	3	2	0	1	54	40	14	4
Nemo Rangers	3	1	1	1	49	56	-7	3
Bandon	3	0	0	3	37	49	-12	0

=== Group B results ===
28 July 2024 Round 1	Bantry Blues	2-20 - 1-13	Nemo Rangers	St Mary's Park
	A Coakley 1-9, K Casey 1-3, J Casey 0-4, S Keevers, R Deane (f) 0-2 each.	Report	C Horgan 1-4, J Coogan (0-1 f), G Sayers (0-2 f) 0-3 each, C Cusack, C Dalton, S O’Dwyer 0-1 each.

28 July 2024 Round 1	Naomh Abán	0-12 - 0-09	Bandon	Carrigadrohid Grounds
	W Mac Carthaigh (0-5), M Ó Duinnín (0-3, 0-1 f), D M Ó Loingsigh (0-2), M Ó Críod and D Ó Ceallaigh (0-1 each).	Report	M Cahalane (0-5, 0-2 fs), C Calnan D Crowley. M Sugrue and B Donegan (0-1 each).

17 August 2024 Round 2	Nemo Rangers	1-11 - 1-11	Naomh Abán	Jack Fitzgerald Memorial Park
	J Coogan 0-6 (0-3 f), C Kiely 1-0, C Dalton, B Hayes 0-2 each, S Dwyer 0-1.	Report	D Ó Ceallaigh 1-1, M Ó Duinnín 0-3 (0-2 f), W Mac Carthaigh, C Ó Críodáin 0-2 each, J Ó Donnchú, M Críod, M Ó Liatháin 0-1 each.

18 August 2024 Round 2	Bandon	0-12 - 1-15	Bantry Blues	Sam Maguire Park
	M Cahalane 0-9 (0-8 frees), D Crowley (0-1 45’, 0-1 free) 0-2, C O’Mahony 0-1.	Report	A Coakley 1-6 (0-3 frees), R Deane (0-2 frees) 0-3, K Coakley 0-2, S Keevers, S O’Leary (0-1 free), D McCarthy, D Daly 0-1 each.

14 September 2024 Round 3	Nemo Rangers	4-07 - 2-10	Bandon	Páic Liam Mhic Cárthaigh
	C Kiely 1-3, B Hayes, M Hill, C Dalton 1-0 each, J Cogan 0-2 f, G Sayers, D Quinn 0-1 f each.	Report	M Cahalane 1-5 (0-3 f), C O’Mahony 1-0, D Crowley, C Long, P Calnan, E McSweeney, J Mulcahy 0-1 each.

14 September 2024 Round 3	Bantry Blues	1-07 - 1-09	Naomh Abán	Páirc Naomh Eoin
	A Coakley 0-5, (0-4 frees), S Keevers 1-0, K Coakley 0-2.	Report	D Ó Ceallaigh 1-3, M Ó Duinnín 0-5 (0-4 frees), M Ó Liatháin 0-1

== Group C ==
=== Group C table ===
Semi-finalists Quarter-finalists Relegation playoff

Team	Matches				Score			Pts
Team	Pld	W	D	L	For	Against	Diff	Pts
Kilshannig	3	3	0	0	50	24	26	6
Rockchapel	3	1	1	1	37	36	1	3
Castletownbere	3	1	1	1	27	39	-12	2
Macroom	3	0	0	3	35	50	-15	0

=== Group C results ===
27 July 2024 Round 1	Castletownbere	0-07 - 2-15	Kilshannig	Castletown Grounds
		Report	Darragh O'Sullivan 1-5, É O'Hanlon 1-4, K O'Hanlon 0-3, A O'Connell 0-1, Diarmuid O'Sullivan 0-1, D Twomey 0-1.

28 July 2024 Round 1	Rockchapel	1-18 - 1-13	Macroom	Dromtarriffe Grounds
	J O’Callaghan (0-4), J Curtin (1-1), J McAuliffe, M McAuliffe (0-3 each), S Hickey, Ciarán Curtin (0-2 each), C Casey (1f), S Curtin, E Murphy (0-1 each).	Report	A Quinn (1-6, 3f), S Kiely (0-3, 1m), P Lucey (1f), C Donovan, E O’Leary, D Twomey (0-1 each).

17 August 2024 Round 2	Kilshannig	0-10 - 0-06	Rockchapel	Kanturk Grounds
	Darragh O’Sullivan 0-6 (0-5f), J O’Hanlon, K O’Hanlon (f), K Twomey, D Twomey 0-1 each.	Report	J Curtin 0-2 (0-1f), M McAulliffe, S Curtin, C Curtin, N Linehan (f) 0-1 each.

17 August 2024 Round 2	Macroom	0-08 - 0-10	Castletownbere	Aughaville Grounds
	F Goold 0-2 (0-1 f), E O’Mahony, D Twomey, S Kiely (f), C Donovan, J Murphy, M Hunt 0-1 each.	Report	F Fenner 0-5 (0-3 f), J Hanley 0-3, G Murphy, J Harrington 0-1 each.

14 September 2024 Round 3	Castletownbere	0-10 - 0-10	Rockchapel	Páirc Uí Chuana
	F Fenner 0-5 f, G Murphy (0-2 f) 0-3, J Harrington 0-1, L Kelly (m) each.	Report	C Curtin, N Lenihan, J Curtin (0-1 f) 0-3 each, K Collins, 0-1.

14 September 2024 Round 3	Kilshannig	3-10 - 1-08	Macroom	Kanturk Grounds
	E O’Hanlon 1-3; Darragh O’Sullivan 0-5 (0-4 f); K O’Hanlon 1-1; Diarmuid O’Sullivan 1-0; C O’Connell 0-1.	Report	A Quinn 0-5 (0-4 f), D Creedon 1-0; S Kiely 0-2; J Murphy 0-1.

== Knockout stage ==
=== Relegation playoff ===
28 September 2024 Playoff	Macroom	1-13 - 1-11	Ilen Rovers	Sam Maguire Park
	A Quinn (0-6, 0-5 frees), E O’Leary (1-1), J Murphy (0-2), D Creedon, T Dineen, D Twomey and J O’Riordan (0-1 each).	Report	D Mac Eoin (0-4, 0-2 frees), M Sheehy (0-3, 0-1 Mark), E Hourihane (1-0), D Hegarty (0-2), J Collins and C O’Driscoll (0-1 each).

=== Quarter-finals ===
28 September 2024 Quarter-final	Iveleary	3-10 - 0-13	Bantry Blues	St Colum's Park
	C Óg Jones 2-4 (1f), D O’Rioran 1-0, I Jones 0-3 (1m), T Roberts 0-2, B O’Leary 0-1.	Report	A Coakley 0-8 (7f), R Deane 0-4 (3f), K Casey 0-1.

28 September 2024 Quarter-final	Naomh Abán	0-09 - 0-06	Rockchapel	Banteer Sportsfield
	M Ó Duinnín 0-3f, D O’Laoire, C Ó Donnchú, W MacCárthaigh, J Ó Donnchú, D M Ó Loingsigh, C Ó Críodáin 0-1 each	Report	J Curtin 0-2f, J Walsh, C Curtin, P Curtin, N Lenihan 0-1 each.

=== Semi-finals ===
11 October 2024 Semi-final	Aghabullogue	0-11 - 1-07	Naomh Abán	Castle Grounds
	M Bradley 0-7 (0-4 f), C Gillespie, A O'Sullivan, E O'Sullivan, J Corkery 0-1 each	Report	D Ó Laoire 1-1, M Ó Duinnín 0-3 (0-2 f), S Ó Riordáin 0-2, D Ó Ceallaigh 0-1.

12 October 2024 Semi-final	Kilshannig	2-11 - 1-11	Iveleary	Páirc Uí Chonchúir
	D O’Sullivan 0-7 (0-4 f, 0-1 m), E O’Hanlon 1-2, K Twomey 1-0, T Cunningham, A O’Connell 0-1 each.	Report	C Óg Jones 1-3 (0-3 f), C Vaughan 0-3 (0-1 f, 0-1 45), C O’Leary 0-2, C Galvin, T Roberts, I Jones 0-1 each.

=== Final ===
26 October 2024 Final	Aghabullogue	1-14 - 1-14	Kilshannig	SuperValu Páirc Uí Chaoimh
	J Corkery 1-3, L Casey, A O’Sullivan 0-3 each, M Bradley 0-2, P O’Sullivan, D Thompson (f), E O’Sullivan, 0-1 each.	Report	Darragh O’Sullivan 0-6 (0-3 f), E O’Hanlon 0-4, A O’Connell 1-0, K O’Hanlon (0-1 f, 0-1 45), Diarmuid O’Sullivan 0-2 each.	Referee: A Whelton (Clonakilty)

=== Final replay ===
3 November 2024 Final replay	Aghabullogue	1-09 - 2-10	Kilshannig	SuperValu Páirc Uí Chaoimh
	L Casey 1-1, M Bradley 0-3 (0-2 f), A O’Sullivan 0-2 (0-1 f), J Corkery, D Thompson (f), A Murphy 0-1 each.	Report	E O’Hanlon 1-2 (0-1 m), Darragh O’Sullivan 0-5 (0-3 f, 0-1 m), Diarmuid O’Sullivan 1-0, C O’Shea 0-2, A O’Connell 0-1.	Referee: A O'Connor (Ballygarvan)

== Championship statistics ==
=== Top scorers ===
Overall

Rank	Player	Club	Tally	Total	Matches	Average
1	Chris Óg Jones	Iveleary	6-27	45	5	9.00
2	Darragh O'Sullivan	Kilshannig	1-34	37	6	6.16
3	Arthur Coakley	Bantry Blues	2-28	34	4	8.50
4	Éanna O'Hanlon	Kilshannig	4-15	27	5	5.40
5	Michael Cahalane	Bandon	1-19	22	3	7.33
6	Matthew Bradley	Aghabullogue	0-21	21	6	3.50
7	Alan Quinn	Macroom	1-17	20	3	6.66
8	Maidhc Ó Duinnín	Naomh Abán	0-17	17	5	3.40
9	Dan Mac Eoin	Ilen Rovers	0-16	16	4	4.00
10	Luke Casey	Aghabullogue	2-07	13	6	2.16

In a single game

Rank	Player	Club	Tally	Total	Opposition
1	Chris Óg Jones	Iveleary	2-08	14	Ilen Rovers
2	Arthur Coakley	Bantry Blues	1-09	12	nemo Rangers
3	Aaron Berry	Aghada	3-01	10	Ilen Rovers
3	Chris Óg Jones	Iveleary	2-04	10	Bantry Blues
5	Alan Quinn	Macroom	1-06	9	Rockchapel
5	Chris Óg Jones	Iveleary	1-06	9	Aghada
5	Arthur Coakley	Bantry Blues	1-06	9	Bandon
5	Michael Cahalane	Bandon	0-09	9	Bantry Blues
9	Darragh O'Sullivan	Kilshannig	1-05	8	Castletownbere
9	Michael Cahalane	Bandon	1-05	8	Nemo Rangers
9	Arthur Coakley	Bantry Blues	0-08	8	Iveleary
