= 1942 Leinster Minor Football Championship =

Championship details

Champions
- Winning team: Louth (6th win)
- Captain: Brendan O'Dowda

Finalists
- Runners-Up: Kildare

The 1942 Leinster Minor Football Championship was the fourteenth staging of the provincial Gaelic football competition for boys under the age of 18 by Leinster GAA, since its inception in 1929.

Louth entered the competition as defending champions and went on to retain the trophy for the third year in a row.

Leinster was the only province to crown a champion for 1942. The other three provincial councils abandoned their Minor competitions, due to travel restrictions imposed by the Irish Government during the Second World War.

Similarly, the Leinster Minor Football Championship was suspended in June 1942. In July 1943, Leinster GAA decided to complete the remaining rounds of their 1942 Minor football and Hurling competitions, as only three matches remained to be played.

The title match in Croke Park was between Louth and Kildare. Louth, ahead by 2–6 to 0–2 at half-time, defeated Kildare by nineteen points to claim their sixth provincial title. Unlike in previous years, the winners did not progress to an All-Ireland semi-final, as the other three provincial Championships had been abandoned. The 1942 competition was the last Leinster Minor Football Championship to be held until the end of the Second World War in 1945.

== Results ==
=== Leinster Minor Football Championship ===
3 May 1942 Quarter-Final	Louth	0-09 – 0-05	Meath	Páirc Tailteann, Navan

10 May 1942 Preliminary	Kildare	5-06 – 1-04	Offaly	St Conleth's Park, Newbridge

24 May 1942 Quarter-Final	Kildare	5-04 – 1-01	Laois	O'Moore Park, Portlaoise

31 May 1942 Semi-Final	Louth	3-08 – 3-05	Dublin	Gaelic Grounds, Drogheda

15 August 1943 Semi-Final	Kildare	3-06 – 2-04	Wexford	Geraldine Park, Athy

==== Final ====
26 September 1943

Louth	5–10 - 0–06	Kildare
P. Donnelly 2-5 (4f), J. MacArtain 2-1, C. O'Brien 1-0, P. Burke, B. O'Dowda, H. O'Rourke, J. White 0-1 each

Croke Park
Referee: P. Mythen (Wexford)

GK	1	Paddy Rogers (De La Salle)
RCB	2	P.J. Grist (Cooley Kickhams)
FB	3	Tom Mulligan (Dundalk Gaels)
LCB	4	Johnny Blake (De La Salle)
RHB	5	Paddy Quigley (Dundalk Young Irelands)
CHB	6	John Cullen (St. Mary's College)
LHB	7	Denis Ryan (Cooley Kickhams)
MF	8	John White (Cooley Kickhams)
MF	9	Brendan O'Dowda (De La Salle) (c)
RHF	10	Peter Donnelly (Drogheda C.B.S.)
CHF	11	Joe MacArtain (Dundalk Young Irelands)
LHF	12	Mickey Reynolds (Ardee Minors)
RCF	13	Charlie O'Brien (Drogheda C.B.S.)
FF	14	Paddy Burke (Ardee Minors)
LCF	15	Hugh O'Rourke (Cooley Kickhams)

GK	1	J. McShortall (Suncroft)
RCB	2	G. Headon (Ballymore Eustace)
FB	3	J. Farrell (Ardclough)
LCB	4	F. Sullivan (Naas)
RHB	5	J. Nevin (Caragh)
CHB	6	W. Hickey (Athy)
LHB	7	J. Byrne (Kilcullen)
MF	8	T. Fox (Athy)
MF	9	B. O'Connor (Ardclough)
RHF	10	D. Conlan (Moorefield)
CHF	11	F. Purcell (Athy)
LHF	12	T. Fullam (Naas)
RCF	13	R. Cullen (Ardclough)
FF	14	E. Monahan (Suncroft)
LCF	15	J. Grehan (Naas)
