= Keith Ricken =

Irish Gaelic football coach (born 1970)

Personal information
- Born: 1970 (age 55–56) Cork, Ireland
- Occupation: University sports administrator

Sport
- Sport: Gaelic football
- Position: Goalkeeper
Club
- Years: Club
- St. Vincent's
Club titles
- Cork titles: 0

Keith Ricken
Sport
Club management
- Years: Club
- St. Vincent's
Inter-county management
- Years: Team
- 2019-2021 2021-2022: Cork under-20 football team Cork senior football team
Inter-county titles as manager
County	League	Province	All-Ireland
Cork (U20) Cork	1; 0	2; 0	2; 0

Michael Keith Ricken (born 1970) is an Irish Gaelic football coach and former player. He has experience as a manager at club and inter-county levels.

Ricken was announced as manager of the senior Cork county team for the 2022 season but was forced to step down due to health problems midway through, with John Cleary taking over on an interim basis.

== Management career ==
Ricken's playing career included time as a goalkeeper with the St. Vincent's club on the northside of Cork city. It was with his home club that he first moved into coaching, guiding the St. Vincent's intermediate team to Premier Intermediate Championship successes in 2006 and again in 2012. During that time he also guided the Cork Institute of Technology to their inaugural Sigerson Cup title. Ricken was appointed manager of the Cork under-20 football team in January 2019 and guided the team to win the 2019 All-Ireland Under-20 Football Championship in his first season in charge. He also secured two Munster U20 Championships.

Ricken was ratified as manager of the senior Cork county team for the 2022 season.

He stood aside as Cork senior manager for the remainder of the season in April 2022, due to health problems. John Cleary replaced him.

== Honours ==
Cork Institute of Technology

- Sigerson Cup: 2009

St. Vincent's

- Cork Premier Intermediate Football Championship (2): 2006, 2012

Cork

- All-Ireland Under-20 Football Championship (1): 2019
- Munster Under-20 Football Championship (2): 2019, 2021
- All-Ireland Minor Football Championship (1): 2026
- Munster Minor Football Championship (1): 2026

Sporting positions
Preceded by Gene O'Driscoll	Cork under-20 football team manager 2019-2021	Succeeded by Bobbie O'Dwyer
Preceded by Ronan McCarthy	Cork senior football team manager 2021-2022	Succeeded by John Cleary
Preceded by Micheál O'Sullivan	Cork minor football team manager 2024-	Succeeded by Incumbent
Achievements
Preceded by Davy Burke	All-Ireland Under-20 Football Final winning manager 2019	Succeeded by Dónal Ó Fatharta
Preceded by Gerard Donnelly	All-Ireland Minor Football Final winning manager 2026	Succeeded by Incumbent
