= 1930 All-Ireland Minor Football Championship =

Gaelic football competition

Championship details

All-Ireland Champions
- Winning team: Dublin (1st win)

All-Ireland Finalists
- Losing team: Mayo

Provincial Champions
- Munster: Clare
- Leinster: Dublin
- Ulster: Armagh
- Connacht: Mayo

The 1930 All-Ireland Minor Football Championship was the second staging of the All-Ireland Minor Football Championship, the Gaelic Athletic Association's premier inter-county Gaelic football tournament for boys under the age of 18.

Clare entered as defending champions, however, they were defeated by Mayo in the All-Ireland semi-final.

On 7 September 1930, Dublin won the championship following a 1-3 to 0-5 defeat of Mayo in the All-Ireland final. This was their first All-Ireland title. The 1930 Provincial Minor Football Championships were delayed due to weather. As the planned fixture dates for the All-Ireland MFC approached, teams were nominated from the unfinished provinces. Dublin was nominated from Leinster despite the fact that Longford were reigning Leinster Minor Champions at the time. Dublin won the All-Ireland MFC beating Mayo in the final. The Leinster MFC final then took place a week later with Dublin beating Longford.

== Results ==
=== All-Ireland Minor Football Championship ===
Semi-finals

17 August 1930 Semi-final	Mayo	2-03 - 0-00	Clare	St. Brendan's Park, Birr

24 August 1930 Semi-final	Dublin	1-03 - 1-01	Armagh	Croke Park, Dublin

Final

7 September 1930 Final	Dublin	1-03 - 0-05	Mayo	Croke Park, Dublin

== Championship statistics ==
=== Miscellaneous ===
- The Connacht and Ulster Championships were held for the first time.
