= Hunterstown =

Hunterstown may refer to:

== Places ==
United Kingdom

- Hunterstown, County Tyrone, a townland in County Tyrone, Northern Ireland

United States

- Hunterstown, Pennsylvania, an unincorporated community in Pennsylvania, United States
- Hunterstown Historic District

== See also ==
- Hunterstown GAA, a Gaelic Athletic Association club in County Louth, Ireland
- Hunterstown Rovers GAC, a Gaelic Athletic Association club in County Louth, Ireland
- Battle of Hunterstown
