= 2019 All-Ireland Under-20 Football Championship =

Championship details
- Dates: 22 June – 3 August 2019
- Teams: 31

All-Ireland Champions
- Winning team: Cork (12th win)
- Captain: Peter O'Driscoll
- Manager: Keith Ricken

All-Ireland Finalists
- Losing team: Dublin
- Captain: James Doran
- Manager: Tom Gray

Provincial Champions
- Munster: Cork
- Leinster: Dublin
- Ulster: Tyrone
- Connacht: Galway

Championship statistics
- No. matches played: 30
- Top Scorer: Ciarán Archer (9–35)
- Player of the Year: Ciarán Archer

The 2019 All-Ireland Under-20 Football Championship was the second staging of the All-Ireland Under-20 Championship and the 56th staging overall of a Gaelic football championship for players between the minor and senior grades. The competition began on 22 June 2019 and ended on 3 August 2019.

The defending champion was Kildare; however, the team was beaten by Laois in the Leinster Championship.

The All-Ireland final was played on 3 August 2019 at O'Moore Park in Portlaoise, between Cork and Dublin, in what was their first meeting in a final in 39 years. Cork won the match by 3-16 to 1-14 to claim a 12th title and a first since 2009.

Dublin's Ciarán Archer was the competition's top scorer with 9-35.

== Results ==
=== Connacht Under-20 Football Championship ===
==== Quarter-final ====
26 June 2019 Quarter-final	Leitrim	4-13 - 3-17	Roscommon	Páirc Seán Mac Diarmada
	M Diffley 2-4 (1-0 pen, 0-3f), J Reynolds & O Bohan 1-1 each, J Gilheaney 0-3 (0-1f), C Cullen 0-2 each, J Clancy & A Hoare 0-1 each.	Report	R Dowd 1-7 (0-5f), P Carey 1-4 (0-2f), D Keenan 0-3, J Fitzpatrick 1-0, D Ruane 0-2, B Derwin 0-1.

==== Semi-finals ====
3 July 2019 Semi-final	Mayo	1-25 - 1-06	Sligo	MacHale Park
	E O’Brien (0-6, 2f), T Conroy (0-5), S McGreal (0-3), A Orme (0-3, 1f), O Mullin (1-0), G Durcan (0-2), P Goldrick (0-2), J Gallagher (0-1), P Towey (0-1) N Moran (0-1), M Moran (0-1).	Report	B Gorman (0-4, 2f), S Carroll (1-0), A Reilly (0-1) S Deignan (0-1, 1f).

3 July 2019 Semi-final	Roscommon	1-07 - 0-17	Galway	Páirc Naomh Bríd
	G Galvin 1-0, R Dowd 0-3 (1f), A Brady 0-1 (’45), B Derwin 0-1 (f), P Carey 0-1 (f), J Fitzpatrick 0-1.	Report	R Cunningham 0-4, D Silke 0-3 (3f), M Tierney 0-3 (2f), L Costello 0-2, P Costello 0-2, R Mahon 0-1, L Boyle 0-1, E Mannion 0-1.

==== Final ====
10 July 2019 Final	Galway	0-16 - 0-10	Mayo	Tuam Stadium
16:00	D Silke 0-5 (0-4f), L Costello 0-4, P Costello 0-3 (0-1f), R Cunningham 0-2, C Newell and M Tierney (0-1f) 0-1 each	Report	E O'Brien 0-4f, P Towey and T Conroy 0-3 each	Referee: P Neilan (Roscommon)

=== Leinster Under-20 Football Championship ===
==== First round ====
22 June 2019 First round	Carlow	2-04 - 3-22	Offaly	Netwatch Cullen Park
	A Kehoe (1-2), P Hynes (1-0), D Ruth (0-2,1f).	Report	C Farrell (0-9, 45, f), C Johnson (1-3), K McDermott (1-2), A Brazil (1-0), J Bryant (0-3), J O'Brien (0-1); C Donnelly (0-1), C Donoghue (0-1); S Farrell (0-1), S O’Toole-Greene (0-1).

22 June 2019 First round	Wexford	1-14 - 2-07	Wicklow	Bellefield Complex
	S Nolan (0-5, 1 free), S Forde (1-1), J Myler (0-3, 1 free), M Molloy (0-2); E Porter (0-1), E Minogue (0-1); D McVeigh (0-1).	Report	E Darcy (1-2, 1-0 pen., 0-1 free), J Deans (1-0), O McGraynor (0-2), P Hempenstall (0-1), R Stokes (0-1), F O'Shea (0-1).

25 June 2019 First round	Kildare	1-11 - 0-17	Laois	St. Conleth's Park
	L Griffin 1-2 (1-0pen, 0-2fs), D Kirwan 0-3, C Joyce 0-2, J Cully 0-2(1f), B McDonnell 0-1, L O'Flynn 0-1	Report	D Whelan 0-10 (3fs), M Doran 0-4, R Coffey 0-1, D Brophy 0-1, E Dunne 0-1'45

==== Quarter-finals ====
2 July 2019 Quarter-final	Westmeath	0-20 - 2-20	Laois	Cusack Park
	D Heavin 0-6 (4f); TJ Cox 0-4 (1f); N Cully 0-3; A Neary (1f), B Cox (1 lineball) 0-2 each; D Martin, A Flanagan, C Nolan 0-1 each.	Report	D Whelan 0-8 (5f); D McCormack 1-2; A Kinsella 0-5 (1f); M Doran 1-1; E Dunne 0-2; J Owens (f), R Tyrell 0-1 each. Westmeath:

2 July 2019 Quarter-final	Meath	1-12 - 0-12	Offaly	Páirc Tailteann
	C McBride 1-0, D McGowan 0-3, L Byrne (1f, 1’45), L Mitchell 0-2 each, J Keane, M Costello, J Morris, C Ahearne, D Dixon 0-1 each.	Report	C Farrell 0-7 (5f), J O’Brien, S O’Toole Greene, C Johnson, J Bryant, N Poland 0-1 each.

2 July 2019 Quarter-final	Louth	0-16 - 3-10	Wexford	Gaelic Grounds
	J Gallagher 0-6 (2f), F Malone 0-3 (2 45’), C Gillespie 0-2, L Jackson, S Hickey, K O’Neill, E Callaghan and L Grey 0-1 each.	Report	J Myler 2-3 (1-0pen, 1f ) Own Goal, S Nolan 0-2(2f), L Coleman, M Molloy, E Minogue, S Forde and D Brooks (145) 0-1 each.

2 July 2019 Quarter-final	Longford	0-07 - 4-21	Dublin	Pearse Park
	O Kenny 0-4f, J Hagan 0-2,1f, A McGuire 0-1.	Report	C Archer 2-8 (5f); H Ladd 1-2; D Lacey 1-1, R McGarry 0-4 (1f); B O’Leary, J Doran 0-2 each; K Lynch Bissett, M Lavin 0-1 each.

==== Semi-finals ====
9 July 2019 Semi-final	Dublin	1-17 - 0-06	Wexford	Parnell Park
	C Archer 1-8 (0-7f), R McGarry (0-1f), J Doran, B O’Leary, N O’Leary 0-2 each, C Kinsella 0-1.	Report	M Molloy 0-2, J Myler (0-1f), D Brooks (0-1f), S Nolan, C Kavanagh 0-1 each.

9 July 2019 Semi-final	Laois	1-13 - 0-07	Meath	O'Moore Park
	A Kinsella 1-1; M Barry 0-4 (3f); R Coffey, D Whelan 0-2 each; C Slevin, J Owens, D McCormack, M Doran 0-1 each.	Report	L Mitchell 0-2f, A Lynch 0-2 (1f); D McGowan (f), M Costello (f), J Morris 0-1 each.

==== Final ====
19 July 2019 Final	Dublin	4-18 - 0-17	Laois	O'Connor Park
20:00	Ciaran Archer 3-8 (1-0 pen, 0-7f), Kieran Kennedy 1-0, James Doran 0-3, Brian O'Leary and Ross McGarry (0-1f) 0-2 each, Sean Lambe, Niall O'Leary, Karl Lynch Bissett 0-1 each	Report	Diarmuid Whelan 0-8 (0-6f), Mark Barry (0-1f) and Alan Kinsella 0-2 each, Eoin Dunne, Michael Doran, Ronan Coffey, Jack Owens, Niall Dunne 0-1 each	Referee: Brendan Cawley (Kildare); Man of the Match: Ciaran Archer (St. Maurs)

=== Munster Under-20 Football Championship ===
==== Quarter-finals ====
2 July 2019 Quarter-final	Waterford	1-10 - 1-09	Clare	Fraher Field
	D Corcoran 1-7 (4fs), T Barron, B Power, D O’Keeffe 0-1 each.	Report	D O’Donnell 0-5 (4fs), C Rouine 1-0, S Casey (1f), D Coughlan (1f) 0-2 each.

2 July 2019 Quarter-final=	Tipperary	1-12 - 1-13	Limerick	Semple Stadium
	R Quigley (1-4, 0-2 frees); S O’Connor (0-5, 0-4 frees); K Grogan (0-2); C Kennedy (0-1 each).	Report	N Callanan (1-3); J Downey (0-3, 0-2 frees, 0-1 ‘45), J Hayes (0-3, 0-3 frees); J Molyneaux (0-2); J Cummins, N McAuliffe (0-1 each).

==== Semi-finals ====
11 July 2019 Semi-final	Kerry	0-18 - 1-03	Limerick	Austin Stack Park
	D O’Sullivan 0-9 (3f); F Clifford 0-3; C Ferriter 0-2; J O’Connor, K Falvey, E Horan and P O’Shea 0-1 each.	Report	J Molyneaux 1-1; J Downey (f) and J Hayes (f) 0-1 each.

12 July 2019 Semi-final	Cork	5-23 - 0-07	Waterford	Ahamilla Complex
	M Cronin 1-4, C O’Mahony 1-4 (0-1 f), D Gore 1-3, J McCarthy, C O’Callaghan 1-0 each, G O’Donovan and P O’Driscoll 0-2 each, M Hodnett 0-2, 1f, M O’Mahony, B Hartnett, C Barrett, B Murphy, F Herlihy, J Murphy 0-1 each.	Report	D Corcoran 0-4 (0-1 f), S Whelan-Barrett, S Curry and B Power 0-1 each.

==== Final ====
18 July 2019 Final	Cork	3-16 - 0-12	Kerry	Pairc Ui Rinn
20:00	C O’Mahony 1-5 (0-2f), M Cronin 0-5 (0-1f), B Murphy 1-1, F Herlihy 1-0, C Barrett and D Gore 0-2 each, C O’Callaghan 0-1	Report	D O’Sullivan 0-5 (0-4f), E Horan 0-3, C Gammel, S O’Leary, F Clifford, P O’Shea 0-1 each	Referee: A Kissane (Waterford)

=== Ulster Under-20 Football Championship ===
==== Preliminary round ====
23 June 2019 Preliminary round	Down	1-16 - 0-11	Antrim	St. Tiernach's Park
	L Kerr 0-5 (0-3fs), S Loughran 0-4 (0-1f), R Carr 0-4 (0-2 45s), A Devlin 1-0, C Clarke 0-1, S Annett 0-1; D McClements 0-1.	Report	T McAteer 0-2, D McErlaine 0-2 (0-2fs); E Nagle 0-2, E McCabe 0-1, P Shivers 0-1 (0-1f), J McCaffrey 0-1; D McAteer 0-1, R Brolly 0-1.

==== Quarter-finals ====
28 June 2019 Quarter-final	Derry	5-12 - 2-13	Armagh	Owenbeg Complex
	P Cassidy (1-04), L McWilliams (1-02), P McGrogan (1-00), E Doherty (1-00), K Friel (1-00), B McCarron (0-03), C McShane (0-01), D Cassidy (0-01), I Donaghy (0-01).	Report	C Turbit (1-06), C McConville (1-01), T Kelly (0-02); N McGuinness (0-01), C Cosgrove (0-01), E McConville (0-01).

28 June 2019 Quarter-final	Fermanagh	0-14 - 0-12	Donegal	Brewster Park
	C Jones (0-3), D McGurn (0-2, 1f), C Love (0-2), E Beacom (0-2), U Kelm (0-1), C McBrien (0-1), L McStravick (0-1), S Cassidy (0-1).	Report	P Dolan (0-3); C O’Donnell (0-3), S McDevitt (0-2f), C O’Donnell (0-21f), R Cunningham (0-1), P Mogan (0-1).

30 June 2019 Quarter-final	Tyrone	2-11 - 1-12	Down	Healy Park
	T Quinn (0-06, 4f), D Canavan (1-01), M McKearney (1-00); R Gormley (0-01), S Og McAleer (0-01, f), M Conroy (0-01), O Mallon (0-01).	Report	C Clarke (1-03), L Kerr (0-04, 2f), S Loughran (0-02, 2f), D McClements (0-02), R McEvoy (0-01).

30 June 2019 Quarter-final	Cavan	1-13 - 2-04	Monaghan	Kingspan Breffni Park
	P Lynch (0-9, 7F), T Reilly (1-1), C O’Reilly (0-1), C Madden (0-1), O Brady (0-1).	Report	S Jones (1-0), A Mohan (1-0), A Woods (0-2, 1f), D Connolly (0-1), R Mohan (0-1).

==== Semi-finals ====
5 July 2019 Semi-final	Derry	1-14 - 1-11	Fermanagh	Healy Park
	D Cassidy (1-02), L McWilliams (0-04, 3f), C McShane (0-03), F Bradley (0-02, 2 ’45); P Cassidy (0-02), A Doherty (0-01).	Report	D McGurn (0-05, 5f), C McBrien (1-01), J Largo Ellis (0-1), C Jones (0-01), D McBrien (0-01); P Breen (0-01, f), J Reihill (0-01).	Referee: N McKenna (Monaghan)

6 July 2019 Semi-final	Cavan	0-09 - 0-13	Tyrone	St. Tiernach's Park
	P Lynch (0-05, 3f, 1 ’45), C O’Reilly (0-01), C Madden (0-01), O Brady (0-01), P Rogers (0-01).	Report	D Canavan (0-04, 1f), S Og McAleer (0-02, 2f), P Og McCartan (0-02), M Conroy (0-02, 1f), L Gray (0-01), R Gormley (0-01), E Jordan (0-01).	Referee: S Laverty (Antrim)

==== Final ====
14 July 2019 Final	Tyrone	4-13 - 1-10	Derry	Athletic Grounds
	S Óg McAleer 1-2, C Quinn 1-0, J Oguz 1-0, J Garrity 1-0 pen, T Quinn (0-2f) and M Conroy (0-1f) 0-3 each, L Quinn (2 '45) and D Canavan 0-2 each, C Grimes 0-1	Report	M McGrogan 0-5 (0-3f), T McHugh 1-0, B McCarron 0-3 (0-2f), C McShane and P Cassidy 0-1 each	Referee: P Faloon (Down)

=== All-Ireland Under-20 Football Championship ===
==== Semi-finals ====
27 July 2019 Semi-final	Dublin	2-14 - 1-10	Galway	Pearse Park
	C Archer 2-6 (0-4f), R McGarry 0-3, B O’Leary 0-2, N O’Leary, J Doran, D Lacey 0-1 each	Report	B Harlowe 1-0, T Gill 0-3 and P Costello (0-2f) 0-3 each, R Cunningham 0-2, L Boyle and M Tierney 0-1 each.	Referee: P Hughes (Armagh)

28 July 2019 Semi-final	Cork	2-17 - 1-18	Tyrone	O'Connor Park
	C O'Mahony 0-7 (0-5f), M Cronin 1-2 (0-1f), J Murphy 1-0, C Barrett, E O'Hanlon, F Herlihy 0-2 each, B Hartnett and M Hodnett 0-1 each	Report	T Quinn 0-6 (0-2f), S Óg McAleer 0-5 (0-2f), D Canavan 1-1, J Garrity and M Conroy (0-1f) 0-2 each, P Óg McCartan and E Jordan 0-1 each	Referee: S Laverty (Antrim)

==== Final ====
3 August 2019 Final	Cork	3-16 - 1-14	Dublin	O'Moore Park
	M Cronin 1-3 (0-2f), B Murphy 1-2, C O'Mahony (0-3f) and D Gore 0-4 each, C O'Callaghan 1-0, D O'Connell, J Murphy, F Herlihy 0-1 each	Report	C Archer 1-5 (0-3f), B O'Leary 0-3, J Doran and R McGarry (0-1f) 0-2 each, D Ryan and D Lacey 0-1 each	Referee: D O'Mahoney (Tipperary)

== Statistics ==
=== Top scorers ===
Top scorers overall

Rank	Player	County	Tally	Total	Matches	Average
1	Ciarán Archer	Dublin	9-35	62	5	12.40
2	Diarmuid Whelan	Laois	0-28	28	4	7.00
3	Cathail O'Mahony	Cork	2-20	26	4	6.50
4	Mark Cronin	Cork	3-14	23	4	5.75
5	Cian Farrell	Offaly	0-16	16	2	8.00
6	Darragh Canavan	Tyrone	2-08	14	4	3.50
6	Darragh Corcoran	Waterford	1-11	14	2	7.00
6	Donal O'Sullivan	Kerry	0-14	14	2	7.00
6	Paddy Lynch	Cavan	0-14	14	2	7.00
7	Jamie Myler	Wexford	2-07	13	3	4.33
7	Ronan Dowd	Roscommon	1-10	13	2	6.50

Top scorers in a single game

Rank	Player	Club	Tally	Total	Opposition
1	Ciarán Archer	Dublin	3-08	17	Laois
2	Ciarán Archer	Dublin	2-08	14	Longford
3	Ciarán Archer	Dublin	2-06	12	Galway
4	Ciarán Archer	Dublin	1-08	11	Wexford
5	Mark Diffley	Leitrim	2-04	10	Roscommon
5	Ronan Dowd	Roscommon	1-07	10	Leitrim
5	Darragh Corcoran	Waterford	1-07	10	Clare
5	Diarmuid Whelan	Laois	0-10	10	Kildare
6	Jamie Myler	Wexford	2-03	9	Louth
6	Cian Farrell	Offaly	0-09	9	Carlow
6	Donal O'Sullivan	Kerry	0-09	9	Limerick
6	Paddy Lynch	Cavan	0-09	9	Monaghan
