= Quilty =

Quilty is an Irish family name which has spread throughout the English-speaking world.

== Origins and history ==
The name "Quilty" is an Anglicized form of the ancient Gaelic name of "Caoilte" (pronounced: Kweelteh). There was a mythic Celtic warrior (c. 3rd Century A.D.) by the name of Caílte mac Rónáin, who was a member of the Fianna and the nephew of Fionn mac Cumhaill. According to legend he lived long enough to be baptized by St. Patrick (c.389-461). The book "If You're A Wee Bit Irish: a chart of old Irish families collected from folk tradition" by William Durning (1978) recounts an alleged ancestry of Caoilte back to Adam. James Joyce (1882–1941) in chapter twelve of his masterpiece, Ulysses, (1922) has "The tribe of Caolte" as one of the twelve tribes of Ireland in a biblical parallel to the twelve tribes of Israel. The name is considered a sept of the dynastic Dál gCais of the Kingdom of Thomond, and has the motto "Lámh Ládir an Nachtar" meaning "the strong hand uppermost."

There are various spellings of the name: Caoilte, Caolte, and Cuallta in Gaelic, and Kielty, Kealty, Keelty, Keilty, Kelty, Kilty, and Quilty (with or without an O' or Mc or Mac) in English. The most common variants are Kielty and Quilty.

The surname Quilty has no connection to the Irish word coillte or caol, which some have stipulated. Edward MacLysaght writes in his 1964 book Supplement to Irish Families, that Quilty is a Munster name that has been mistakenly translated from the Irish word caol (slender) or coillte—plural of Irish word coill (wood). Coillte is the namesake of a town named Quilty located in the County Clare. Sources from the 14th and 15th century have the spelling as O'Kilte but ones from the 16th century onwards have spellings as Quilty, O'Quiltye, or other variants. While according to MacLysaght other alternatives for the names such as Kielty are found in the County Offaly, Roscommon, Galway, and Tyrone; while MacQuilty in the County Antrim. According to MacLysaght "I have not discovered its origin, but it is presumably unconnected with O'Quilty."

=== Oldest Documented Quiltys ===
Some sources say that the oldest referenced Quilty is in the Annals of Ulster in the year 1169. Where a "Muiredach Ua Cellaig" is referenced. However the last name "Ua Cellaig" is an old form of the last name Kelly or Kelley rather than Quilty.

The first documented reference of a Quilty is given in a 1313 Justiciary Roll under the reign of Edward II (also known as Edward of Caernarfon). In this record an unnamed O'Kilte is mentioned as a servant of a Nobleman named John Harold. Where in Mowan, Lymerick when they were robbed of "two affers worth 20s".

Richard O'Kilte is mentioned in the Calendar of Ormond Deeds, Volume 2, in an entry dated November 1405 during the 7th year of Henry IV. He is recorded as receiving payment for guarding a house of almonds, a duty assigned by warrant of James le Botiller, Earl of Ormond. His role, guarding a "house of almonds" is listed among various other transactions involving individuals responsible for different tasks related to the Earl’s estates in counties Kilkenny and Tipperary.

The first documented instance of an approximate to the modern most common spelling is given in Wexfordiana, Vol. VIII: Extracts from the Calendar of Memoranda Rolls of the Exchequer under the reign of Queen Elizabeth I. The writing describes a "Dionisius O'Quiltye" overseeing a transaction between a FitzMaurice and the Alderman of the City of Waterford on the 17th of September 1579. His occupation at this time is given as "cleric" within the Diocese of Ferns which is mostly located in the County Wexford. Denis is again mentioned in Fatsi Ecclesiæ Hibernicæ by Henry Cotton for the Province of Leinster, now with the surname spelt as "Quilty". It shows him being recorded at a precentor for the Diocese of Ferns from 1587-1600. Cotton also emphasizes that the 1615 regal visitation book called him "an ancient minister".

Thomas Laffan's publication of the 1665-67 Hearth Money Rolls for the County Tipperary list a Morrish (Maurice?) O'Quiltye as of having lived in "Bonnovoie" in the parish of Sallahode-more in the barony of Clanwilliam.

=== Modern Distribution ===
As of 2014, the majority of people with the surname Quilty were located in English-speaking countries. In the United States, there were 982 individuals bearing the surname, followed by 630 in Australia, 593 in Canada, 308 in the United Kingdom, 301 in Ireland, 83 in New Zealand, and 22 in various other nations.

In 1850 there were over 75 families bearing the name of "Quilty" in Ireland, over half of them in County Limerick. As of 2005, there were about 300 families bearing the name of "Quilty" in the United States alone, almost half them in the northeast, with the highest concentrations in the states of Massachusetts, New York, Florida, Illinois, and California.

== Notable people with the surname ==
- Andrew Quilty, Australian photographer, cousin of Ben
- Ben Quilty (born 1973), Australian painter
- Johnny Quilty (1921–1969), Canadian ice hockey player
- Michelle Quilty (1990–), Irish camogie player
- Patrick Quilty (1939–2018), Australian geologist and paleontologist
- Sean Quilty (1966–2022), Australian Olympic marathon runner
- Sylvester "Silver" Quilty (1891–1976), Canadian football player
- Tom Quilty (1887–1979), Australian station owner, philanthropist and poet
- Tim Quilty, Australian politician.

=== Fictional characters with the name Quilty ===
- Bridie Quilty, protagonist in the film I See a Dark Stranger (1941), played by Deborah Kerr
- Clare Quilty, a fictional character in the 1955 novel Lolita by Vladimir Nabokov

== Other uses of the name Quilty ==
Places

- Quilty, County Clare, is a village on the west coast of Ireland
- Quilty Nunataks, a geographic feature of Antarctica named for geologist Patrick Quilty

In music

- Quilty was an Irish folk group named after the Clare village, mainly hailing from County Londonderry, who released one album entitled "Music of Ireland" through Arfolk/Escalibur in 1979.
- Clare Quilty is a rock group from Virginia, USA, named for the character from Lolita

In fiction

- The Quilties are a fictional race in the novel The Gnome King of Oz by Ruth Plumly Thompson

Media

- Quilty was an American magazine published by F+W between 2011 and 2018.
