= Leinster Minor Football Championship =

Gaelic football championship

- Founded: 1929
- Region: Leinster (GAA)
- No. of teams: 11
- Title holders: Kildare (10th title)
- Most titles: Dublin (35 titles)
- Sponsors: Electric Ireland
- Official website: Official website

The Leinster Minor Football Championship is the premier under-17 "knockout" competition in gaelic football played in the province of Leinster. 2017 was the final year of the minor under 18 football championship as it were replaced by an under 17 championship following a vote at the GAA Congress on 26 February 2016.

The current Leinster champions are Longford. The Leinster minor football championship is known as the Fr. Larry Murray Trophy. The Cup is named after Fr. Larry Murray who was an underage GAA mentor in both Louth and Armagh, hence the Ulster Minor Football Championship is also named after Fr. Larry Murray.

== History ==
The Leinster Minor Football Championship was first played in 1928, however progress stalled at the semi-final stage and the competition was never completed. The first completed Leinster MFC was in 1929 and Longford won the inaugural title beating Dublin in the final in Navan on a scoreline of 3–4 to 1–4 on 10 November 1929. Longford progressed to the All-Ireland final that year (only Leinster and Munster involved) but were beaten by Clare in the All-Ireland final on 1 March 1930. With the exception of 1943 & 1944 the Leinster MFC has been completed every year since 1929.

== Roll of honour ==
#	County	Titles	Runners-up	Years won	Years runner-up
1	Dublin	35	17	1930, 1933, 1934, 1945, 1946, 1948, 1949, 1954, 1955, 1956, 1958, 1959, 1961, 1968, 1970, 1971, 1976, 1978, 1979, 1981, 1982, 1984, 1986, 1988, 1994, 1999, 2001, 2003, 2009, 2011, 2012, 2014, 2017, 2022, 2023	1929, 1935, 1947, 1950, 1962, 1963, 1967, 1969, 1972, 1977, 1987, 1991, 1996, 2000, 2019, 2021, 2024
2	Meath	13	15	1957, 1972, 1977, 1980, 1985, 1990, 1992, 1993, 2006, 2008, 2018, 2020, 2021	1946, 1954, 1955, 1956, 1970, 1975, 1979, 1981, 1983, 1986, 1988, 2002, 2011, 2012, 2026
3	Kildare	10	15	1973, 1975, 1983, 1987, 1991, 2013, 2015, 2016, 2019, 2026	1934, 1940, 1942, 1949, 1953, 1965, 1980, 1989, 1990, 2004, 2009, 2014, 2018, 2022, 2023
3	Laois	9	7	1932, 1966, 1967, 1996, 1997, 1998, 2004, 2005, 2007	1933, 1964, 1968, 1973, 1995, 2003, 2016
5	Louth	8	9	1931, 1935, 1936, 1940, 1941, 1942, 1951, 1953	1932, 1937, 1938, 1939, 1958, 1960, 1971, 2017, 2025,
6	Offaly	7	13	1947, 1960, 1962, 1964, 1965, 1989, 2025	1948, 1957, 1959, 1961, 1966, 1976, 1985, 2001, 2005, 2006, 2008, 2010, 2020
7	Westmeath	5	5	1939, 1952, 1963, 1995, 2000	1951, 1982, 1984, 1992, 2013
8	Longford	5	3	1929, 1938, 2002, 2010, 2024	1930, 1974, 2015
9	Wexford	3	7	1937, 1950, 1969	1931, 1936, 1941, 1945, 1978, 1994, 1999
10	Wicklow	1	3	1974	1952, 1993, 1997
11	Carlow	0	1	—	2007

- All (1928–1999) Leinster Minor Football Results available here .

== List of finals ==
All-Ireland champions
All-Ireland runners-up

Year	Winners		Runners-up		Venue	Winning Captain
Year	County	Score	County	Score	Venue	Winning Captain
1929^{1}	Longford	3–04	Dublin	1–04	Navan	Paddy Keenan
1930	Dublin	1–06	Longford	0–04	Mullingar	Brendan Synnott
1931	Louth	1–05	Wexford	0–03	Croke Park, Dublin	John Harlin
1932	Laois	3–02	Louth	1–07	Croke Park, Dublin	Joe Hinchin
1933	Dublin	3–07	Laois	0–06	Croke Park, Dublin	
1934	Dublin	0–05	Kildare	0–02	Naas	
1935	Louth	1–07	Dublin	1–06	Croke Park, Dublin	
1936	Louth	3–06	Wexford	2–01	Croke Park, Dublin	Larry McEntee
1937	Wexford	2–07	Louth	2–05	Croke Park, Dublin	Nick Butler
1938	Longford	3–06	Louth	2–08	Croke Park, Dublin	
1939	Westmeath	1–02	Louth	0–02	Croke Park, Dublin	
1940	Louth	3–05	Kildare	1–06	Croke Park, Dublin	Brendan Burke
1941	Louth	4–04	Wexford	1–06	Croke Park, Dublin	Mick O'Grady
1942	Louth	5–10	Kildare	0–06	Croke Park, Dublin	Brendan O'Dowda
1943	No competition	-	-	-	-	-
1944	No competition	-	-	-	-	-
1945	Dublin	3–05	Wexford	1–00	Portlaoise	Seán McEntaggart
1946	Dublin	4–06	Meath	0–03	Navan	
1947	Offaly	1–07, 1–07 (R)	Dublin	1–07, 1–05 (R)	Croke Park, Dublin R Mullingar	Paddy Hanamy
1948	Dublin	2–05	Offaly	1–06	Naas	Cyril Freaney
1949	Dublin	3–10	Kildare	1–05	Portlaoise	
1950	Wexford	3–06	Dublin	2–08	Croke Park, Dublin	Bernie McGuinness
1951	Louth	3–09	Westmeath	2–05	Croke Park, Dublin	Michael Brennan
1952	Westmeath	3–14	Wicklow	3–03	Croke Park, Dublin	Declan O'Sullivan
1953	Louth	1–06	Kildare	0–06	Croke Park, Dublin	John McArdle
1954	Dublin	2–07	Meath	0–11	Croke Park, Dublin	Vinnie Bell
1955	Dublin	2–11	Meath	1–04	Croke Park, Dublin	Paddy Heron
1956	Dublin	1–10	Meath	1–09	Croke Park, Dublin	Lar Foley
1957	Meath	0–08	Offaly	0–05	Mullingar	Brendan Cahill
1958	Dublin	2–10	Louth	1–06	Navan	Des Foley
1959	Dublin	3–13	Offaly	1–07	Tullamore	Mick Kissane
1960	Offaly	1–12	Louth	1–05	Croke Park, Dublin	Pat Heffernan
1961	Dublin	2–08	Offaly	1–08	Portlaoise	
1962	Offaly	2–08	Dublin	1–04	Croke Park, Dublin	Kieran Kenny
1963	Westmeath	2–14	Dublin	3–07	Tullamore	Frankie Connaughton
1964	Offaly	1–07	Laois	1–06	Croke Park, Dublin	Seán Grogan
1965	Offaly	2–11	Kildare	1–05	Croke Park, Dublin	Paddy Byrne
1966	Laois	1–10	Offaly	0–07	Croke Park, Dublin	Johnny Lawlor
1967	Laois	1–08	Dublin	2–04	Newbridge	Jim Mangan
1968	Dublin	1–11	Laois	0–08	Croke Park, Dublin	
1969	Wexford	0–11	Dublin	0–07	Carlow	Brendan Murphy
1970	Dublin	2–08	Meath	0–13	Croke Park, Dublin	Joe Finucane
1971	Dublin	2–07	Louth	0–04	Croke Park, Dublin	
1972	Meath	3–08	Dublin	1–10	Croke Park, Dublin	Eamonn O'Brien
1973	Kildare	4–11	Laois	0–10	Croke Park, Dublin	Jack Graham
1974	Wicklow	5–06	Longford	1–09	Croke Park, Dublin	Pat O'Toole
1975	Kildare	2–09	Meath	3–05	Croke Park, Dublin	Ron Mackey
1976	Dublin	2–08	Offaly	0–13	Croke Park, Dublin	Larry Broderick
1977	Meath	1–07	Dublin	0–09	Croke Park, Dublin	Gerard Cooney
1978	Dublin	3–12	Wexford	0–11	Croke Park, Dublin	Pat Canavan
1979	Dublin	2–13	Meath	0–08	Croke Park, Dublin	Mick Loftus
1980	Meath	1–12	Kildare	1–09	Croke Park, Dublin	Finian Murtagh
1981	Dublin	1–08	Meath	0–09	Croke Park, Dublin	Stephen Loftus
1982	Dublin	0–10	Westmeath	0–04	Croke Park, Dublin	Liam O'Rourke
1983	Kildare	1–11	Meath	1–06	Croke Park, Dublin	Peter Loftus
1984	Dublin	0–12	Westmeath	1–06	Croke Park, Dublin	Paul Clarke
1985	Meath	0–11	Offaly	1–04	Croke Park, Dublin	Phil Fay
1986	Dublin	2–16	Meath	0–06	Croke Park, Dublin	Kevin Fagan
1987	Kildare	0–13	Dublin	2–05	Croke Park, Dublin	Fintan Buckley
1988	Dublin	4–06	Meath	0–08	Croke Park, Dublin	Ger Regan
1989	Offaly	2–11	Kildare	0–07	Croke Park, Dublin	Daragh Scully
1990	Meath	1–19	Kildare	1–06	Croke Park, Dublin	Enda McManus
1991	Kildare	2–08	Dublin	0–12	Croke Park, Dublin	Niall Buckley
1992	Meath	1–08	Westmeath	1–05	Tullamore	Peter Sullivan
1993	Meath	1–16	Wicklow	3–03	Croke Park, Dublin	Barry Sheridan
1994	Dublin	2–12	Wexford	2–06	Croke Park, Dublin	Ian Robertson
1995	Westmeath	0–12, 3–12, 3–06, 1–10 (3R)	Laois	1–09, 2–15, 2–09, 0–09 (3R)	Croke Park, Dublin R in Tullamore	Damien Gavin
1996	Laois	0–15, 2–18 (R)	Dublin	2–09, 1–08 (R)	Croke Park, Dublin R in Tullamore	Martin Delaney
1997	Laois	2–11	Wicklow	0–10	Croke Park, Dublin	Kieran Kelly
1998	Laois	2–09	Dublin	0–12	Croke Park, Dublin	Johnny Behan
1999	Dublin	1–13, 2–13 (R)	Wexford	2–10, 1–12 (R)	Croke Park, Dublin Carlow	Nicky Cleere
2000	Westmeath	2–09	Dublin	1–10	Croke Park, Dublin	Alan Lambden
2001	Dublin	1–19	Offaly	0–06	Croke Park, Dublin	Barry Lyons
2002	Longford	3–08	Meath	3–05	Croke Park, Dublin	Enda Williams
2003	Dublin	1–11	Laois	1–09	Croke Park, Dublin	Cian Cleere
2004	Laois	0–10	Kildare	0–06	Croke Park, Dublin	Craig Rogers
2005	Laois	1–12	Offaly	1–07	Croke Park, Dublin	Richie Ryan
2006	Meath	1–16	Offaly	2–05	Croke Park, Dublin	Paddy Brady
2007	Laois	3–08	Carlow	1–12	Croke Park, Dublin	Seán Ramsbottom
2008	Meath	1–14	Offaly	2–10	Croke Park, Dublin	Tommy Johnson
2009	Dublin	1–10, 1–15 (R)	Kildare	1–10, 1–10 (R)	Croke Park, Dublin Carlow	Colm Carr
2010	Longford	0–14	Offaly	0–08	Croke Park, Dublin	Dylan Quinn
2011	Dublin	2–18	Meath	1–11	Croke Park, Dublin	Robbie McDaid
2012	Dublin	3–17	Meath	1–11	Croke Park, Dublin	David Byrne
2013	Kildare	2–15	Westmeath	2–07	Croke Park, Dublin	Mark Sherry
2014	Dublin	3–16	Kildare	1–12	Croke Park, Dublin	Con O'Callaghan
2015	Kildare	2–15	Longford	1–09	Croke Park, Dublin	Shea Ryan/Conor Hartley
2016	Kildare	1–18	Laois	0–10	Croke Park, Dublin	Brian McLoughlin
2017	Dublin	2–19	Louth	0–12	Croke Park, Dublin	Donal Ryan
2018	Meath	1–15	Kildare	1–07	O'Connor Park, Tullamore	Mathew Costello
2019	Kildare	2–21	Dublin	1–19	Pairc Tailteann, Navan	Kevin Eustace/Aaron Browne
2020	Meath	1–07	Offaly	1–06	Cusack Park, Mullingar	Eoghan Frayne
2021	Meath	3–08	Dublin	1–03	O'Connor Park, Tullamore	Liam Kelly
2022	Dublin	2–10	Kildare	0–08	O'Moore Park, Portlaoise	Daniel McCarthy/Clyde Burke
2023	Dublin	0–19	Kildare	2–08	O'Moore Park, Portlaoise	Cillian Emmett
2024	Longford	0–15	Dublin	1–10	O'Connor Park, Tullamore	Mark Cooney
2025	Offaly	2–20	Louth	3–14	St Conleth's Park, Newbridge	Cian McNamee
2026	Kildare	2–13	Meath	1–16	O'Moore Park, Portlaoise	Charlie Doran

== See also ==
- All-Ireland Minor Football Championship
- Connacht Minor Football Championship
- Munster Minor Football Championship
- Ulster Minor Football Championship
