= 1990 All-Ireland Senior Football Championship final =

- Event: 1990 All-Ireland Senior Football Championship
Meath	Cork
0–9	0–11
- Date: 16 September 1990
- Venue: Croke Park, Dublin
- Referee: Paddy Russell (Tipperary)
- Attendance: 65,723

The 1990 All-Ireland Senior Football Championship final was a Gaelic football match played at Croke Park on 16 September 1990 to determine the winners of the 1990 All-Ireland Senior Football Championship, the 104th season of the All-Ireland Senior Football Championship, a tournament organised by the Gaelic Athletic Association for the champions of the four provinces of Ireland. The final was contested by Meath of Leinster and Cork of Munster, with Cork winning by 0–11 to 0–9.

== Match ==
This year's final was played on 16 September.

=== Summary ===
For the third time in four years Meath faced Cork in an All-Ireland SFC decider, as the champions of 1987 and 1988 did battle with the reigning champions. In the first half, Cork had built up a nice lead before there plans were derailed somewhat. A pumped-up Colm O'Neill hit Meath's Mick Lyons, and was dismissed from the field of play. In spite of this, Cork still held a one-point lead at half-time.

The second half was a dour struggle. Cork's strategy of isolating Meath's extra player worked well as Shay Fahy dominated midfield. The final score of 0–11 to 0–9 gave Cork the title.

Cork's All-Ireland SFC final victory was the second in succession, the first and only time in the team's history to have retained the title. The win gave the team a sixth All-Ireland SFC title overall, and put them fourth in their own right on the all-time roll of honour.

Meath were appearing in a first All-Ireland SFC final since they triumphed in 1988. Defeat at the hands of Cork was the first of back-to-back All-Ireland SFC final defeats for the Royal County.

1990 is regarded as the greatest year in the history of the GAA in Cork. In winning the All-Ireland SFC title against Meath, Cork achieved a rare double, as the Cork senior hurling team had earlier claimed the All-Ireland SHC title against Galway. It also marked the 100th anniversary of Cork achieving their previous double.

Cork's Denis Walsh, as a substitute, and Teddy McCarthy became dual All-Ireland medallists once again; however, McCarthy's achievement was the most spectacular of all. As a member of the starting fifteen in both codes he became the first player in the history of the Gaelic Athletic Association to win All-Ireland medals in both codes in the same season. It is a record which still stands.

The referee played 9 seconds of additional time.

=== Details ===
16 September 1990
15:15 IST

Meath	0–9 – 0–11	Cork
B Stafford (0–6), B Flynn (0–1), C Coyle (0–1), D Beggy (0–1)	Report	S Fahy (0–4), L Tompkins (0–4), M McCarthy (0–2), P McGrath (0–1)

Croke Park, Dublin
Attendance: 65,723
Referee: Paddy Russell (Tipperary)

Meath	Cork

1	Donal Smyth
2	Robbie O'Malley
3	Mick Lyons
4	Terry Ferguson	Substituted off
5	Brendan Reilly
6	Kevin Foley
7	Martin O'Connell
8	Liam Hayes
9	Gerry McEntee	Substituted off
10	David Beggy	Substituted off
11	P.J. Gillic
12	Colm Brady	Substituted off
13	Colm O'Rourke
14	Brian Stafford
15	Bernard Flynn
Substitutes:
	Colm Coyle	Substituted on
	Joe Cassells	Substituted on
	Tommy Dowd	Substituted on
Manager:
Seán Boylan

1	John Kerrins
2	Tony Nation
3	Steven O'Brien
4	Niall Cahalane
5	Mick Slocum
6	Conor Counihan
7	Barry Coffey (c)
8	Danny Culloty
9	Shea Fahy
10	Dave Barry	Substituted off
11	Larry Tompkins
12	Teddy McCarthy
13	Paul McGrath	Substituted off
14	Colm O'Neill	Red card
15	Mick McCarthy	Substituted off
Substitutes:
16	Michael Maguire
17	Colman Corrigan
18	Tony Davis
19	Paddy Hayes	Substituted on
20	John O'Driscoll	Substituted on
21	John Cleary	Substituted on
22	Jimmy Kerrigan
23	Denis Walsh
24	Mark O'Connor
Manager:
Billy Morgan
