= 1987 All-Ireland Senior Football Championship final =

- Event: 1987 All-Ireland Senior Football Championship
Meath	Cork
1–14 (17)	0–11 (11)
- Date: 20 September 1987
- Venue: Croke Park, Dublin
- Referee: Pat Lane (Limerick)
- Attendance: 68,431

The 1987 All-Ireland Senior Football Championship final was the 100th All-Ireland Final and the deciding match of the 1987 All-Ireland Senior Football Championship, an inter-county Gaelic football tournament for the top teams in Ireland.

== Match ==
=== Summary ===
Meath won with a goal by Colm O'Rourke. The win was also helped by poor shooting from Larry Tompkins, as he missed 6 of 8 frees in the second half.

- The game was played a crowd of over 68,000 spectators.
- Meath emerged victorious with a scoreline of 1-14 to 0-11.
- The decisive moment came when Colm O'Rourke and Brian Stafford led a strong attacking display, while Gerry McEntee controlled the midfield.

=== Details ===
20 September 1987	Meath	1-14 - 0-11	Cork	Croke Park, Dublin
	B Stafford 0-7, C O'Rourke 1-1, D Beggy 0-3, G McEntee 0-1, B Flynn 0-1, PJ Gillic 0-1.		L Tompkins 0-6, J Cleary 0-1, C Ryan 0-1, N Cahalane 0-1, J O'Driscoll 0-1, C O'Neill 0-1.	Attendance: 68,431; Referee: P Lane (Limerick)

==== Meath ====
- 1 M. McQuillan
- 2 R. O'Malley
- 3 M. Lyons (c)
- 4 T. Ferguson
- 5 K. Foley
- 6 L. Harnan
- 7 M. O'Connell
- 8 L. Hayes
- 9 G. McEntee
- 10 D. Beggy
- 11 J. Cassells
- 12 P. J. Gillic
- 13 C. O'Rourke
- 14 B. Stafford
- 15 B. Flynn

Subs used
21 C. Coyle for J. Cassells
17 P. Lyons for M. O'Connell

Subs not used
16 D. Smith
18 F. Murtagh
19 M. McCabe
20 F. Foley

Manager
S. Boylan

==== Cork ====
- 1 J. Kerins
- 2 T. Davis
- 3 C. Corrigan
- 4 D. Walsh
- 5 T. Nation
- 6 C. Counihan (c)
- 7 N. Cahalane
- 8 S. Fahy
- 9 T. McCarthy
- 10 J. O'Driscoll
- 11 L. Tompkins
- 12 J. Kerrigan
- 13 C. O'Neill
- 14 C. Ryan
- 15 J. Cleary

Subs used
17 J. Evans for C. Corrigan
20 T. Leahy for S. Fahy
21 P. Hayes for C. Ryan

Subs not used
16 F. Delaney
18 M. Slocum
19 D. Culloty
22 B. Coffey
23 T. Mannix
24 M. McCarthy
25 N. Creedon

Manager
B. Morgan
