= 1988 All-Ireland Senior Football Championship final =

- Event: 1988 All-Ireland Senior Football Championship
| Meath | Cork |
| 0–12 (12) | 1–9 (12) |
- Date: 18 September 1988
- Venue: Croke Park, Dublin
- Man of the Match: Larry Tompkins
- Referee: Tommy Sugrue (Kerry)
- Attendance: 65,000

1988 All-Ireland Senior Football Championship final replay
| Meath | Cork |
| 0–13 | 0–12 |
- Date: 9 October 1988
- Venue: Croke Park, Dublin
- Man of the Match: Martin O'Connell
- Referee: Tommy Sugrue (Kerry)
- Attendance: 64,069

The 1988 All-Ireland Senior Football Championship final was the 101st All-Ireland Final and the deciding match of the 1988 All-Ireland Senior Football Championship, an inter-county Gaelic football tournament for the top teams in Ireland.

== Match 1 ==
=== Summary ===
Cork scored a goal three minutes in and Brian Stafford scored a controversial equaliser

David Beggy brought the sides level to force a replay.

=== Details ===
| 18 September 1988 Final | Meath | 0–12 – 1–9 | Cork | Croke Park, Dublin |
| | B Stafford 0–8, C O'Rourke 0–4. | | L Tompkins 0–8, T McCarthy 1–0, M McCarthy 0–1. | Attendance: 65,898; Referee: Tommy Sugrue (Kerry) |

== Match 2 ==
=== Summary ===
Meath's Gerry McEntee was sent off in the seventh minute of the replay. He was guilty of striking Niall Cahalane.

The match was dominated by Meath's aggressive play.

According to Colm Keys, the replay was "one of the most brutal finals" due to Meath's style of play.

Meath won the replay by a point. Colm O'Rourke scored Meath's last point — which proved to be the winning score, when Cork began to close in on Meath towards the end.

In 2018, Martin Breheny listed the replay as the tenth greatest All-Ireland Senior Football Championship Final.

=== Details ===
| 9 October 1988 Final replay | Meath | 0–13 – 0–12 | Cork | Croke Park, Dublin |
| | B Stafford 0–7, C O'Rourke 0–3, B Flynn 0–1, D Beggy 0–1, J Cassells 0–1. | | L Tompkins 0–8, B Coffey 0–2, D Allen 0–1, D Barry 0–1. | Attendance: 64,069; Referee: Tommy Sugrue (Kerry) |

==== Meath (is this the replay or the drawn game?) ====
- 1 M. McQuillan
- 2 R. O'Malley
- 3 M. Lyons
- 4 T. Ferguson
- 5 C. Coyle
- 6 L. Harnan
- 7 M. O'Connell
- 8 L. Hayes
- 9 G. McEntee
- 10 D. Beggy
- 11 J. Cassells (c)
- 12 P. J. Gillic
- 13 C. O'Rourke
- 14 B. Stafford
- 15 B. Flynn

Sub used
19 M. McCabe

Subs not used
16 S. Smyth
17 P. Lyons
18 F. Murtagh
20 F. Foley
21 K. Foley

Manager
S. Boylan

==== Cork (is this the replay or the drawn game?) ====
- 1 J. Kerins
- 2 N. Cahalane
- 3 C. Corrigan
- 4 S. O'Brien
- 5 T. Davis
- 6 C. Counihan
- 7 T. Nation (c)
- 8 S. Fahy
- 9 T. McCarthy
- 10 P. McGrath
- 11 L. Tompkins
- 12 B. Coffey
- 13 D. Allen
- 14 D. Barry
- 15 M. McCarthy

Subs used
20 C. O'Neill for M. McCarthy
21 J. O'Driscoll for P. McGrath

Subs not used
16 M. Maguire
17 D. Walsh
18 M. Burns
19 D. Culloty
22 J. Cleary
23 J. Kerrigan
24 M. Slocum

Manager
B. Morgan
