= 1991 All-Ireland Senior Football Championship final =

- Event: 1991 All-Ireland Senior Football Championship
Down	Meath
1–16 (19)	1–14 (17)
- Date: 15 September 1991
- Venue: Croke Park, Dublin
- Man of the Match: James McCartan
- Referee: Séamus Prior (Leitrim)
- Attendance: 64,500
- Weather: Sunny

The 1991 All-Ireland Senior Football Championship final was the 104th All-Ireland Final and the deciding match of the 1991 All-Ireland Senior Football Championship, an inter-county Gaelic football tournament for the top teams in Ireland.

== Match ==
=== Summary ===
Meath had beaten Dublin in the famous four-game saga, but Down stormed into an 11-point lead and Meath's rally was too little, too late.

This was Down's fourth appearance in an All-Ireland SFC final, and their fourth win from four.

=== Details ===
15 September 1991
15:30 IST (UTC+1)

Down	1–16 – 1–14	Meath
Ross Carr 0–5 (0–4f), Gary Mason 0–4 (0–3f), Barry Breen 1–0, James McCartan 0–3, Éamonn Burns 0–2, Mickey Linden 0–1, Greg Blaney 0–1		Bernard Flynn 0–6, Brian Stafford 0–5 (0–4f), Liam Hayes 1–1, Colm O'Rourke 0–1, David Beggy 0–1

Croke Park, Dublin
Attendance: 64,500
Referee: Séamus Prior (Leitrim)

Down	Meath

1	Neil Collins
2	Brendan McKernan
3	Conor Deegan
4	Paul Higgins
5	John Kelly
6	Paddy O'Rourke (c)
7	D. J. Kane
8	Barry Breen	(substituted off) 54'
9	Éamonn Burns
10	Ross Carr
11	Greg Blaney
12	Gary Mason
13	Mickey Linden
14	Peter Withnell	(substituted off) 66'
15	James McCartan
Substitutes:
16	Pat Donnan
17	Mick Quinn
18	Martin Laverty
19	Paul McCartan
20	Mark McCartan
21	Liam Austin	(substituted in) 54'
22	Jarlath Austin
23	Cathal Murray
24	Ambrose Rogers	(substituted in) 66'
Manager:
Pete McGrath

1	Michael McQuillan
2	Brendan Reilly
3	Mick Lyons	(substituted off) 52'
4	Terry Ferguson
5	Kevin Foley
6	Liam Harnan
7	Martin O'Connell
8	Liam Hayes (c)
17	Gerry McEntee
10	David Beggy
11	Tommy Dowd
12	Colm Coyle	(substituted off) 43'
9	P. J. Gillic	(substituted off) 59'
14	Brian Stafford
15	Bernard Flynn
Substitutes:
16	Donal Smyth
13	Colm O'Rourke	(substituted in) 43'
18	Mattie McCabe	(substituted in) 59'
19	Alan Browne	(substituted in) 52'
20	John McDermott
21	Hugh Carolan
22	Seán Kelly
23	Finian Murtagh
24	Ian Kearney
Manager:
Seán Boylan
