= 1987–88 National Football League (Ireland) =

Gaelic football competition

League details
- Dates: October 1987 – 22 May 1988

League champions
- Winners: Meath (5th win)
- Captain: Mick Lyons
- Manager: Seán Boylan

League runners-up
- Runners-up: Dublin
- Captain: Barney Rock
- Manager: Gerry McCaul

The 1987–88 National Football League, known for sponsorship reasons as the Royal Liver National Football League, was the 57th staging of the National Football League (NFL), an annual Gaelic football tournament for the Gaelic Athletic Association county teams of Ireland.

Meath won the league, beating Dublin in a replayed final.

== Format ==
=== Divisions ===
- Division One: 8 teams
- Division Two: 8 teams
- Division Three: 16 teams. Split into two regional groups of 8 (North and South)

=== Round-robin format ===
Each team played every other team in its division (or group where the division is split) once, either home or away.

=== Points awarded ===
2 points were awarded for a win and 1 for a draw.

=== Titles ===
Teams in all three divisions competed for the National Football League title.

=== Knockout stage qualifiers ===
- Division One: top 4 teams
- Division Two: top 2 teams
- Division Three (North): group winners
- Division Three (South): group winners

=== Knockout phase structure ===
In the quarter-finals, the match-ups were as follows:

- Quarter-final 1: First-placed team in Division One v First-placed team in Division Three (South)
- Quarter-final 2: Second-placed team in Division One v First-placed team in Division Three (North)
- Quarter-final 3: Third-placed team in Division One v Second-placed team in Division Two
- Quarter-final 4: Fourth-placed team in Division One v First-placed team in Division Two

The semi-final match-ups are:

- Semi-final 1: Winner Quarter-final 1 v Winner Quarter-final 4
- Semi-final 2: Winner Quarter-final 2 v Winner Quarter-final 3

The final match-up is: Winner Semi-final 1 v Winner Semi-final 2.

=== Promotion and relegation ===
- Division One: bottom 2 teams demoted to Division Two
- Division Two: top 2 teams promoted to Division One. Bottom 2 teams demoted to Division Three.
- Division Three (North): group winners promoted to Division Two.
- Division Three (South): group winners promoted to Division Two.

=== Separation of teams on equal points ===
In the event that teams finish on equal points, then a play-off will be used to determine group placings if necessary, i.e. where to decide relegation places or quarter-finalists.

== League Phase Results and Tables ==
=== Division One ===
==== Division One (A) play-offs ====
13 March 1988 For 5th Place	Armagh	2-8 — 0-6	Mayo	Carrick-on-Shannon

20 March 1988 For 6th Place	Kerry	0-14 — 0-10	Mayo	Cusack Park, Ennis

==== Table ====
Team	Pld	W	D	L	Pts	Status
Dublin	7	5	2	0	12	Advance to quarter-finals
Meath	7	4	2	1	10	Advance to quarter-finals
Monaghan	7	4	1	2	9	Advance to quarter-finals
Derry	7	3	0	4	6	Advance to quarter-finals
Armagh	7	2	1	4	5
Kerry	7	2	1	4	5
Mayo	7	2	1	4	5	Relegated to Division Two of the 1988–89 NFL
Cork	7	1	2	4	4	Relegated to Division Two of the 1988–89 NFL

=== Division Two ===
Team	Pld	W	D	L	Pts	Status
Down	7	5	1	1	11	Advance to quarter-finals; promoted to Division One of the 1988–89 NFL
Donegal	7	5	1	1	11	Advance to quarter-finals; promoted to Division One of the 1988–89 NFL
Galway	7	3	3	1	9
Kildare	7	4	1	2	9
Roscommon	7	3	0	4	6
Cavan	7	2	1	4	5
Clare	7	1	2	4	4	Relegated to Division Three of the 1988–89 NFL
Laois	7	0	1	6	1	Relegated to Division Three of the 1988–89 NFL

=== Division Three (South) ===
==== Promotion play-offs ====
13 March 1988 Semi-Final	Longford	1-15 — 0-7	Wexford	O'Moore Park, Portlaoise

13 March 1988 Semi-Final	Limerick	2-9 — 0-10	Tipperary	Cusack Park, Ennis

20 March 1988 Final	Longford	0-8 — 0-7	Limerick	O'Moore Park, Portlaoise

==== Division Three (North) table ====
Team	Pld	W	D	L	Pts	Status
Louth	7	6	1	0	13	Advance to quarter-finals; promoted to Division Two of the 1988–89 NFL
Antrim	7	4	2	1	10
Tyrone	7	4	1	2	9
Fermanagh	7	3	0	4	6
Leitrim	7	3	0	4	6
Offaly	7	2	3	3	6
Westmeath	7	2	0	5	4
Sligo	7	1	0	6	2

==== Division Three (South) table ====
Team	Pld	W	D	L	Pts	Status
Longford	7	5	0	2	10	Advance to quarter-finals; promoted to Division Two of the 1988–89 NFL
Limerick	7	5	0	2	10
Tipperary	7	5	0	2	10
Wexford	7	5	0	2	10
Wicklow	7	3	0	4	6
Carlow	7	2	0	5	4
Waterford	7	2	0	5	4
Kilkenny	7	1	0	6	2

=== Division Three Final ===
8 May 1988	Louth	1-09 – 0-09	Longford	Cootehill, Cavan
	R. Culhane 0-5 (4f), J. McDonnell 1-0, P. Reneghan 0-2, G. Curran, B. McEntee 0-1 each		J. McCormack (0-5, 3f), D. Barry, J. Keegan, F. McNamee, M. O'Hara 0-1 each	Referee: G. Neeson (Monaghan)

GK	1	Niall O'Donnell (Clan na Gael)
RCB	2	Pat Matthews (St Mary's)
FB	3	David Mulligan (St Joseph's)
LCB	4	Stephen Melia (John Mitchels)
RHB	5	Dessie Callaghan (Newtown Blues)
CHB	6	Martin McCann (Dundalk Young Irelands)
LHB	7	Peter Fitzpatrick (Clan na Gael) (c)
MF	8	Séamus O'Hanlon (Clan na Gael)
MF	9	Gerry Curran (Clan na Gael)
RHF	10	Kevin Gorham (Dundalk Young Irelands)
CHF	11	Paul Reneghan (Geraldines)
LHF	12	Brendan McEntee (Oliver Plunketts)
RCF	13	Johnny McDonnell (St Fechin's)
FF	14	Richie Culhane (Newtown Blues)
LCF	15	Kevin Dawe (Dreadnots)
Substitutes:
	16	Vincent Litchfield (Kilkerley Emmets) for Dawe

GK	1	Christy Grogan
RCB	2	Gerry Fox (Seán Connollys)
FB	3	John Toher (Killoe Young Emmets)
LCB	4	Seán O'Shea (Civil Service, Dublin)
RHB	5	Cathal Lee (Colmcille)
CHB	6	Joe McCabe (Ballymahon)
LHB	7	Mickey Harkins (St. Mary's)
MF	8	Mark McNamara (Mostrim)
MF	9	Francis McNamee (Fr. Manning Gaels)
RHF	10	Gerry Clarke (Forgney)
CHF	11	Philip Kiernan (St Patrick's) (c)
LHF	12	John Keegan (St Patrick's)
RCF	13	Mickey O'Hara (Mostrim)
FF	14	Dessie Barry (Longford Slashers)
LCF	15	John McCormack (Killoe Young Emmets)
Substitutes:
	16	Declan Rowley (Killoe Young Emmets) for Clarke

== Knockout stage ==
=== Quarter-final ===
13 March 1988

Monaghan	1-5 – 0-6	Donegal

Healy Park, Omagh

13 March 1988

Meath	1-9 – 0-8	Louth
Flynn (1-2), Stafford (0-5, 3f, 1'45), Gillic (0-1), O'Rourke (0-1)		Dawe (0-4, 2f, 1sl), C. O'Hanlon (0-1), D. McDonnell (0-1), J. McDonnell (0-1), Culhane (0-1)

Croke Park, Dublin
Referee: Séamus Aldridge (Kildare)

GK	1	Mickey McQuillan (St Patrick's)
RCB	2	Robbie O'Malley (St Colmcille's)
FB	3	Mick Lyons (Summerhill)
LCB	4	Terry Ferguson (Gaeil Colmcille)
RHB	5	Kevin Foley (Trim)
CHB	6	Liam Harnan (Moynalvey)
LHB	7	Martin O'Connell (St Michael's)
MF	8	Liam Hayes (Skryne)
MF	9	Gerry McEntee (Nobber)
RHF	10	David Beggy (Navan O'Mahonys)
CHF	11	P.J. Gillic (Carnaross)
LHF	12	Brendan Reilly (Dunboyne)
RCF	13	Colm O'Rourke (Skryne)
FF	14	Brian Stafford (Kilmainhamwood)
LCF	15	Bernard Flynn (St Colmcille's)
Substitutes:
	16	Frank Foley (Trim) for Harnan
	17	Mattie McCabe (Seneschalstown) for Beggy

GK	1	Niall O'Donnell (Clan na Gael)
RCB	2	Pat Matthews (Oliver Plunketts)
FB	3	David Mulligan (St Joseph's)
LCB	4	Stephen Melia (John Mitchels)
RHB	5	Dessie Callaghan (Newtown Blues)
CHB	6	Martin McCann (Dundalk Young Irelands)
LHB	7	Peter Fitzpatrick (Clan na Gael) (c)
MF	8	Séamus O'Hanlon (Clan na Gael)
MF	9	Gerry Curran (Clan na Gael)
RHF	10	Eugene Judge (Newtown Blues)
CHF	11	Paul Reneghan (Geraldines)
LHF	12	Davie McDonnell (Dundalk Gaels)
RCF	13	Jimmy McDonnell (Civil Service, Dublin)
FF	14	Richie Culhane (Newtown Blues)
LCF	15	Kevin Dawe (Dreadnots)
Substitutes:
	16	Cathal O'Hanlon (Clan na Gael) for Judge

20 March 1988

Down	2-13 – 1-16	Derry

Armagh

27 March 1988
Replay

Down	2-6 – 0-10	Derry

Armagh

27 March 1988

Dublin	0-10 – 0-4	Longford

Croke Park, Dublin

=== Semi-final ===
3 April 1988

Dublin	4-12 – 1-8	Monaghan

Croke Park, Dublin

3 April 1988

Meath	0-13 – 1-9	Down

Croke Park, Dublin

=== Final ===
17 April 1988

Meath	0-11 – 1-8	Dublin

Croke Park, Dublin

22 May 1988
Replay

Meath	2-13 – 0-11	Dublin

Croke Park, Dublin
