= 1992–93 National Football League (Ireland) =

Football league

League details
- Dates: October 1992 – 9 May 1993

League champions
- Winners: Dublin (8th win)
- Captain: John O'Leary
- Manager: Pat O'Neill

League runners-up
- Runners-up: Donegal
- Captain: Anthony Molloy
- Manager: Brian McEniff

The 1992–93 National Football League, known for sponsorship reasons as the Royal Liver Assurance National Football League, was the 62nd staging of the National Football League (NFL), an annual Gaelic football tournament for the Gaelic Athletic Association county teams of Ireland.

Dublin defeated Donegal in the final after a replay, getting some revenge after losing the 1992 All-Ireland Final. Both finals were ill-tempered games, with two red cards in the first game and one in the second.

== Format ==
This was a one-off format for the National Football League. In order to re-format the league into four divisions, the 1992-93 league consisted of four "mixed ability" groups of eight teams each. The experimental format threw up some of the most unusual pairings in league history, and was credited with boosting attendances by as much as 60 per cent.

=== Divisions ===
There was one division comprising 32 teams, split into four groups of eight teams each.

=== Round-robin format ===
Each team played every other team in its division (or group where the division is split) once, either home or away.

=== Points awarded ===
2 points were awarded for a win and 1 for a draw.

=== Titles ===
Teams in all four groups competed for the National Football League title.

=== Knockout stage qualifiers ===
- Group A: top 2 teams
- Group B: top 2 teams
- Group C: top 2 teams
- Group D: top 2 teams

=== Promotion and relegation ===
Teams qualified for the four divisions of the 1993-94 National Football League based on their position in their group.

- Division One: teams placed first and second in each group
- Division Two: teams placed third and fourth in each group
- Division Three: teams placed fifth and sixth in each group
- Division Four: teams placed seventh and eight in each group

== League Tables ==
=== Group A ===
Team	Pld	W	D	L	Pts	Status
Dublin	7	6	0	1	12	Advance to Quarter-final and enter Division One of 1993–94 NFL
Derry	7	6	0	1	12	Advance to Quarter-final and enter Division One of 1993–94 NFL
Galway	7	5	0	2	10	Enter Division Two of 1993–94 NFL
Louth	7	3	2	2	8	Enter Division Two of 1993–94 NFL
Wexford	7	4	0	3	8	Enter Division Three of 1993–94 NFL
Antrim	7	2	0	5	4	Enter Division Three of 1993–94 NFL
Sligo	7	1	1	5	3	Enter Division Four of 1993–94 NFL
Limerick	7	1	0	6	2	Enter Division Four of 1993–94 NFL

=== Group B ===
Team	Pld	W	D	L	Pts	Status
Donegal	7	7	0	0	14	Advance to Quarter-final and enter Division One of 1993–94 NFL
Kildare	7	6	0	1	12	Advance to Quarter-final and enter Division One of 1993–94 NFL
Cork	7	4	1	2	9	Enter Division Two of 1993–94 NFL
Leitrim	7	4	1	2	9	Enter Division Two of 1993–94 NFL
Cavan	7	3	0	4	6	Enter Division Three of 1993–94 NFL
Tipperary	7	2	0	5	4	Enter Division Three of 1993–94 NFL
Longford	7	1	0	6	2	Enter Division Four of 1993–94 NFL
Carlow	7	0	0	7	0	Enter Division Four of 1993–94 NFL

=== Group C ===
Team	Pld	W	D	L	Pts	Status
Kerry	7	6	1	0	13	Advance to Quarter-final and enter Division One of 1993–94 NFL
Mayo	7	5	1	1	11	Advance to Quarter-final and enter Division One of 1993–94 NFL
Fermanagh	7	4	0	3	8	Enter Division Two of 1993–94 NFL
Laois	7	3	1	3	7	Enter Division Two of 1993–94 NFL
Tyrone	7	3	0	4	6	Enter Division Three of 1993–94 NFL
Armagh	7	3	0	4	6	Enter Division Three of 1993–94 NFL
Wicklow	7	2	1	4	5	Enter Division Four of 1993–94 NFL
Kilkenny	7	0	0	7	0	Enter Division Four of 1993–94 NFL

=== Group D ===
Team	Pld	W	D	L	Pts	Status
Clare	7	4	3	0	11	Advance to Quarter-final and enter Division One of 1993–94 NFL
Meath	7	4	2	1	10	Advance to Quarter-final and enter Division One of 1993–94 NFL
Down	7	4	2	1	10	Enter Division Two of 1993–94 NFL
Monaghan	7	3	1	3	7	Enter Division Two of 1993–94 NFL
Offaly	7	2	3	2	7	Enter Division Three of 1993–94 NFL
Roscommon	7	3	1	3	7	Enter Division Three of 1993–94 NFL
Westmeath	7	2	0	5	4	Enter Division Four of 1993–94 NFL
Waterford	7	0	0	7	0	Enter Division Four of 1993–94 NFL

== Knockout stages ==
=== Quarter-finals ===
4 April 1993

Kerry	0-16 – 0-15 AET	Down

Croke Park
Attendance: 11,724
Referee: S Prior, Leitrim

11 April 1993

Donegal	0-10 – 2-3	Derry

Breffni Park

11 April 1993

Dublin	1-13 – 0-8	Kildare

Croke Park

11 April 1993

Clare	0-9 – 0-8	Mayo

MacHale Park, Castlebar

=== Semi-finals ===
18 April 1993

Dublin	1-10 – 0-11	Kerry

Croke Park, Dublin

18 April 1993

Donegal	1-12 – 1-7	Clare

Croke Park, Dublin

=== Finals ===
2 May 1993
Final

Dublin	0-9 – 0-9	Donegal

Croke Park, Dublin
Attendance: 51,179
Referee: Brian White (Wexford)

9 May 1993
Final Replay

Dublin	0-10 – 0-6	Donegal

Croke Park, Dublin
Attendance: 59,703
Referee: Brian White (Wexford)
