= Michael McQuillan =

Michael McQuillan may refer to:

- Michael McQuillan (Gaelic footballer)
- Michael McQuillan (mathematician)
