= Brendan Reilly (Meath Gaelic footballer) =

Irish Gaelic footballer

Personal information
- Native name: Breandán Ó Raghallaigh (Irish)
- Born: 20 August 1969 (age 57) Dunboyne, County Meath, Ireland
- Occupation: Midland Electric employee
- Height: 5 ft 10 in (178 cm)

Sport
- Sport: Gaelic football
- Position: Full-forward
Club
- Years: Club
- St Peter's, Dunboyne
Club titles
- Meath titles: 1
Inter-county
- Years: County
- 1987–1998: Meath
Inter-county titles
- Leinster titles: 4
- All-Irelands: 2
- NFL: 3
- All Stars: 1

Brendan Reilly (born 20 August 1969) is an Irish former Gaelic footballer who played for club side St Peter's, Dunboyne and at inter-county level with the Meath senior football team. He usually lined out as a forward.

== Career ==
Born in Dunboyne, County Meath, Reilly's father, Jim Reilly, was an All-Ireland SFC-winner with Meath in 1954. He first came to prominence at club level with the St Peter's, Dunboyne club and, in a hugely successful club career, won county championship medals in every adult grade. Reilly was 18-years-old when he made his debut with the Meath senior team during the National Football League in late 1987 and was a member of the extended panel when Meath beat Cork in the 1988 All-Ireland SFC final. While it took several seasons before he broke onto the senior team on a more permanent basis, he won an All-Ireland JFC title, as well as provincial honours with the Meath under-21 team. Reilly won an All-Ireland SFC medal on the field of play when he scored the winning point in the 199 All-Ireland SFC final defeat of Mayo. He was an All-Star recipient in 1997, while his other inter-county honours include Leinster SFC and National League titles.

== Honours ==
St Peter's, Dunboyne

- Meath Senior Football Championship: 1998
- Meath Intermediate Football Championship: 1992
- Meath Junior Football Championship: 1989

Meath

- All-Ireland Senior Football Championship: 1988, 1996
- Leinster Senior Football Championship: 1988, 1990, 1991, 1996
- National Football League: 1987–88, 1989–90, 1993–94
- All-Ireland Junior Football Championship: 1988
- Leinster Junior Football Championship: 1988
- Leinster Under-21 Football Championship: 1989, 1990

Awards

- All-Star: 1997

Sporting positions
Preceded by	Meath senior football team captain 1998	Succeeded by Graham Geraghty
