= Terrance Ferguson =

Terrance Ferguson may refer to:

- Terrance Ferguson (basketball) (born 1998), an American professional basketball player
- Terrance Ferguson (American football) (born 2003), an American professional football player

== See also ==
- Terry Ferguson, former Irish Gaelic football player
