= Stephen Melia =

Louth Gaelic footballer and manager

Personal information
- Native name: Stiofán Ó Máille (Irish)
- Born: 1962 Ardee, County Louth
- Died: 23 October 2015 (aged 53)
- Occupation: Great Northern Brewery employee

Sport
- Sport: Gaelic football
- Position: half-back
Clubs
- Years: Club
- John Mitchels; O'Dwyer's (Dublin); St Joseph's
Club titles
- Louth titles: 1
Inter-county
- Years: County
- 1984–2001: Louth
Inter-county titles
- Leinster titles: 0

Stephen Melia (1962 – 23 October 2015) was an Irish Gaelic footballer who played for the Louth county team. At club level he represented John Mitchels, O'Dwyer's and St Joseph's.

Known for his fitness, Melia made a total of 179 appearances for his county over seventeen years. During that time he won National League, O'Byrne Cup and All-Ireland B honours. He assisted manager Paddy Clarke as a selector for the final two years of his Louth career. He again filled the role of Louth selector during the managerial reign of Eamonn McEneaney.

He was frequently selected on the Leinster panel for Railway Cup matches. In the 1993 final he lined out at left half-back in a three-point defeat to Ulster.

At the age of 44 in 2006, Melia appeared in his first ever Louth SFC final, lining out for the "underdog" St Joseph's against St Patrick's. St Joseph's won the game by four points.

Melia died in October 2015 after battling Motor Neurone Disease.

== Honours ==
John Mitchels

- Louth Junior A Football League (2): 1981, 1990
- Louth Junior Football Championship (1): 1992

St Joseph's

- Louth Senior Football Championship: (1) 2006

Louth

- All-Ireland Senior B Football Championship (1): 1997
- National Football League Division 2 (2): 1996-97, 1999-2000
- National Football League Division 3 (1): 1987–88
- O'Byrne Cup (1): 1990

Sporting positions
Preceded by Kevin O'Hanlon	Louth Senior Football Captain; 1991	Succeeded by Stefan White

Preceded by Peter Fitzpatrick	Louth Senior Football Captain; 1995	Succeeded by Séamus O'Hanlon
