= 1932–33 National Football League (Ireland) =

Gaelic football tournament in Ireland

League details
- Dates: April 1932 – September 1933

League champions
- Winners: Meath (1st win)
- Captain: Bill Shaw

League runners-up
- Runners-up: Cavan
- Captain: Jim Smith

The 1932–33 National Football League was the 6th staging of the National Football League, a Gaelic football tournament for the Gaelic Athletic Association county teams of Ireland, held in 1932 and 1933.

Meath won the league, with captain Bill Shaw (Summerhill) scoring a last-minute point to win the final.

== Format ==
There were three divisions – Western, 'A', and Midland. The winners of the Western Division met the winners of Division 'A' in the semi-final, while the winners of the Midland Division proceeded to the final.

There was also a Special Division, but the winners of this did not progress to the knockout stages.

== Main League ==
=== Midland Division ===
==== Results ====
Louth and Armagh both withdrew.

16 October 1932 Round 1	Cavan	3-7 — 1-4	Longford	Longford,

20 November 1932 Round 2	Westmeath	3-4 — 1-4	Longford	Athlone,

4 December 1932 Round 3	Cavan	1-8 — 0-5	Westmeath	Breffni Park, Cavan

==== Table ====
Team	Pld	W	D	L	Pts	Status
Cavan	2	2	0	0	4	Qualified for Final
Westmeath	2	1	0	1	2
Longford	2	0	0	2	0

=== Division 'A' ===
==== Results ====
30 October 1932 Round 1	Kerry	3-3 — 1-3	Laois	Portlaoise

13 November 1932 Round 1	Kerry	0-9 — 0-7	Dublin	Austin Stack Park, Tralee

27 November 1932 Round 2	Meath	1-4 — 0-2	Dublin	Navan

19 February 1933 Round 2	Meath	1-8 — 0-6	Laois	Portlaoise

5 March 1933 Round 3	Dublin	2-8 — 0-6	Laois	Croke Park, Dublin

19 March 1933 Round 3	Meath	1-4 — 0-2	Kerry	Navan

==== Table ====
Team	Pld	W	D	L	Pts	Status
Meath	3	3	0	0	6	Qualified for Semi-Final
Kerry	3	2	0	1	4
Dublin	3	1	0	2	2
Laois	3	0	0	3	0

=== Western Division ===
Mayo won, ahead of Sligo, Galway, Leitrim and Roscommon.

==== Results ====
2 April 1933 Round	Mayo	4-9 — 1-5	Leitrim	Carrick-on-Shannon

23 April 1933 Round	Sligo	3-6 — 2-4	Leitrim	Carrick-on-Shannon

7 May 1933 Round	Mayo	3-6 — 1-5	Galway	Castlebar

21 May 1933 Round	Mayo	1-12 — 0-4	Sligo	Castlebar

=== Finals ===
10 September 1933
Semi-Final

Meath	2-7 – 1-3	Mayo

Navan

22 October 1933
Final

Meath	0-10 – 1-6	Cavan

Croke Park, Dublin
Attendance: 11,100
Referee: Martin O'Neill (Wexford)

== Special Division ==
=== Special Division (Eastern Section) ===
Wicklow, Wexford, Carlow,

=== Special Division (Southern Section) ===
Cork, Waterford, Clare, Limerick

22 January 1933 Final	Cork	4-5 — 2-3	Limerick	Glin

=== Final ===
26 March 1933

Wexford	3-5 – 1-8	Cork

Wexford
