= 1949–50 National Football League (Ireland) =

Gaelic football competition

League details
- Dates: October 1949 – 5 August 1950

League champions
- Winners: New York (1st win)
- Captain: M. O'Sullivan

League runners-up
- Runners-up: Cavan
- Captain: John Joe O'Reilly

The 1949–50 National Football League was the 19th National Football League (NFL) staging, an annual Gaelic football tournament for Ireland's Gaelic Athletic Association county teams.

Cavan beat Meath in the home final to get revenge for the defeat in the 1949 All-Ireland Final. For the first time, New York received a bye to the final, where they defeated the "home" champions.

== Format ==
Teams are placed into Divisions I, II, III and IV. The top team in each division reaches the home semi-finals. The winner of the home final plays New York in the NFL final.

== Results ==
=== Division II ===
Carlow, Waterford, Wexford, Tipperary, Cork

=== Division III ===
Kerry won, ahead of Mayo, Clare, Laois and Galway.

=== Division IV ===
Dublin, Kildare, Meath, Louth, Westmeath, Wicklow

=== Division V ===
Sligo, Longford, Roscommon, Offaly, Cavan

Team	P	W	D	L	Pts
* Cavan	5	5	0	0	10
Roscommon	5	3	0	2	6
Longford	5	2	1	2	5
Offaly	5	2	0	3	4
* Leitrim	5	1	1	3	3
Sligo	5	1	0	4	2

- Leitrim gave walkover to Cavan in the final round

=== Finals ===
16 April 1950
Quarter-Final

Meath	1-10 – 0-8	Derry

Lurgan

30 April 1950
Semi-Final

Cavan	3-9 – 1-5	Kerry

Croke Park, Dublin

23 April 1950
Semi-Final

Meath	1-7 – 1-7	Wexford

Croke Park, Dublin

14 May 1950
Semi-Final Replay

Meath	1-11 – 1-6	Wexford

Croke Park, Dublin

3 June 1950
Home Final

Cavan	2-8 – 1-6	Meath
Peter Donohoe 0-4; Johnny Cusack, Edwin Carolan 1-0 each; Mick Higgins 0-2; Tony Tighe 0-1		Frankie Byrne 0-4; Paddy Meegan 1-0; Mattie McDonnell 0-2

Croke Park, Dublin
Attendance: 38,258
Referee: J Leonard (Dublin)

5 August 1950
Final

Cavan	0-12 – 2-8	New York

Croke Park, Dublin
Attendance: 31,872
Referee: Moss Colbert (Limerick)
