= John McDermott (Gaelic footballer) =

Irish Gaelic footballer

Personal information
- Native name: Seán Mac Diarmada (Irish)
- Born: Curraha, County Meath

Sport
- Sport: Gaelic football
- Position: Midfield
Clubs
- Years: Club
- Curraha; Skryne
Inter-county
- Years: County
- 1991–2001: Meath
Inter-county titles
- Leinster titles: 4
- All-Irelands: 2
- All Stars: 3

John McDermott is a former Irish Gaelic footballer who played for the Meath county team. He won a number of inter-county football titles, during the 1990s, on the Meath teams managed by Sean Boylan. For Meath, he played in the midfield position.

== Playing career ==
=== Club ===
McDermott played club football first for Curraha and later Skryne.

=== Inter-county ===
McDermott was on the Meath panel that reached the 1991 All-Ireland Senior Football Championship Final. He had to be taken off injured in Meath's surprising first round loss to Laois in 1992. He was lucky not to be sent off in the 1996 All-Ireland Senior Football Championship Final.

During his playing career, he won two All-Ireland Senior Football Championship medals (1996, 1999), as well as three Leinster Senior Football Championship medals and one National Football League medal. He also won 2 All Star awards. He retired after the 2000 season but returned for the All-Ireland series of the 2001 season.

=== International rules ===
As well as playing for Meath, McDermott played in several matches against Australia in the International Rules Series. He was made the captain of the Irish team in 1998 and 1999.
