= 1989–90 National Football League (Ireland) =

Gaelic football competition

League details
- Dates: October 1989 – 29 April 1990

League champions
- Winners: Meath (6th win)
- Captain: Colm O'Rourke
- Manager: Seán Boylan

League runners-up
- Runners-up: Down
- Captain: Paddy O'Rourke

The 1989–90 National Football League, known for sponsorship reasons as the Royal Liver Assurance National Football League, was the 59th staging of the National Football League (NFL), an annual Gaelic football tournament for the Gaelic Athletic Association county teams of Ireland.

The tournament introduced several experimental rules: game divided into four quarters; all kick outs from the hands from within the small rectangle; free kicks from the hands or the ground; all sideline kicks from the hands; teeing up the ball is a foul. Of these rules, only the free kick from hand or ground, and the illegality of teeing up the ball, survive to the modern day. Meath defeated Down in the final.

== Format ==
=== Divisions ===
- Division One: 8 teams
- Division Two: 8 teams
- Division Three: 16 teams. Split into two regional groups of 8 (North and South)

=== Round-robin format ===
Each team played every other team in its division (or group where the division is split) once, either home or away.

=== Points awarded ===
2 points were awarded for a win and 1 for a draw.

=== Titles ===
Teams in all three divisions competed for the National Football League title.

=== Knockout stage qualifiers ===
- Division One: top 4 teams
- Division Two: top 2 teams
- Division Three (North): group winners
- Division Three (South): group winners

=== Knockout phase structure ===
In the quarter-finals, the match-ups were as follows:

- Quarter-final 1: First-placed team in Division One v First-placed team in Division Three (South)
- Quarter-final 2: Second-placed team in Division One v First-placed team in Division Three (North)
- Quarter-final 3: Third-placed team in Division One v Second-placed team in Division Two
- Quarter-final 4: Fourth-placed team in Division One v First-placed team in Division Two

The semi-final match-ups are:

- Semi-final 1: Winner Quarter-final 1 v Winner Quarter-final 4
- Semi-final 2: Winner Quarter-final 2 v Winner Quarter-final 3

The final match-up is: Winner Semi-final 1 v Winner Semi-final 2.

=== Promotion and relegation ===
- Division One: bottom 2 teams demoted to Division Two
- Division Two: top 2 teams promoted to Division One. Bottom 3 teams demoted to Division Three.
- Division Three (North): group winners promoted to Division Two. Group runners up play-off for the third promotion slot from Division Three.
- Division Three (South): group winners promoted to Division Two. Group runners up play-off for the third promotion slot from Division Three.

=== Separation of teams on equal points ===
In the event that teams finish on equal points, then a play-off will be used to determine group placings if necessary, i.e. where to decide relegation places or quarter-finalists.

== League Tables ==
=== Division One ===
==== Play-offs ====
11 March 1990 For 4th Place	Dublin	1-14 — 1-9	Armagh	Drogheda

==== Table ====
Team	Pld	W	D	L	Pts	Status
Cork	7	5	1	1	11	Advance to quarter-finals
Down	7	5	0	2	10	Advance to quarter-finals
Donegal	7	5	0	2	10	Advance to quarter-finals
Dublin	7	4	0	3	8	Advance to quarter-finals
Armagh	7	3	2	2	8
Kerry	7	2	0	5	4
Cavan	7	1	1	5	3	Relegated to Division Two of the 1990–91 NFL
Derry	7	1	0	6	2	Relegated to Division Two of the 1990–91 NFL

=== Division Two ===
==== Second Place play-offs ====
11 March 1990 Semi-Final	Meath	0-15 — 0-7	Mayo	Croke Park, Dublin

11 March 1990 Semi-Final	Tyrone	0-12 — 0-8	Antrim	Omagh

25 March 1990 Final	Meath	1-20 — 1-10	Tyrone	Breffni Park, Cavan
				Attendance: 5,000; Referee: F. Finan (Sligo)

==== Table ====
Team	Pld	W	D	L	Pts	Status
Roscommon	7	5	1	1	11	Advance to quarter-finals; Promoted to Division One of the 1990–91 NFL
Meath	7	4	0	3	8	Advance to quarter-finals; Promoted to Division One of the 1990–91 NFL
Tyrone	7	3	2	2	8
Antrim	7	4	0	3	8
Mayo	7	4	0	3	8
Monaghan	7	2	1	4	5	Relegated to Division Three of the 1990–91 NFL
Louth	7	2	0	5	4	Relegated to Division Three of the 1990–91 NFL
Wexford	7	2	0	5	4	Relegated to Division Three of the 1990–91 NFL

=== Division Three ===
==== Division Three (North) play-offs ====
18 March 1990 For 2nd Place	Leitrim	4-8 — 2-7	Offaly	Roscommon

==== Division Three (South) play-offs ====
25 March 1990 For 1st Place	Kildare	2-9 — 1-9	Wicklow	Carlow

==== Division Three Promotion play-offs ====
15 April 1990 For 1st Place	Leitrim	0-17 — 1-9	Wicklow	Mullingar
				Referee: A O'Neill Derry

==== Division Three (North) table ====
Team	Pld	W	D	L	Pts	Status
Longford	7	5	2	0	12	Advance to quarter-finals; Promoted to Division Two of the 1990–91 NFL
Leitrim	7	4	1	2	9	Promoted to Division Two of the 1990–91 NFL
Offaly	7	4	1	2	9
Galway	7	4	0	3	8
Laois	7	4	0	3	8
Fermanagh	7	3	0	4	6
Sligo	7	1	0	6	2
Westmeath	7	1	0	6	2

==== Division Three (South) table ====
Team	Pld	W	D	L	Pts	Status
Kildare	7	6	0	1	12	Advance to quarter-finals; Promoted to Division Two of the 1990–91 NFL
Wicklow	7	6	0	1	12
Limerick	7	5	0	2	10
Tipperary	7	4	0	3	8
Clare	7	3	1	3	7
Waterford	7	1	1	5	3
Carlow	7	1	0	6	2
Kilkenny	7	1	0	6	2

== Knockout stages ==
=== Quarter-finals ===
1 April 1990

Cork	4-10 – 5-5	Kildare

Portlaoise

1 April 1990

Roscommon	2-22 – 3-13	Dublin

Portlaoise

1 April 1990

Meath	2-12 – 0-13	Donegal

Clones

1 April 1990

Down	1-21 – 1-5	Longford

Navan

=== Semi-finals ===
15 April 1990

Meath	0-14 – 0-10	Cork

Croke Park, Dublin

15 April 1990

Down	4-8 – 0-11	Roscommon

Croke Park, Dublin

=== Final ===
29 April 1990
Final

Meath	2-7 – 0-11	Down

Croke Park, Dublin
