= St Colmcille's GAA =

- Naomh Colmcille CLG
- Founded: 1971
- County: Meath
- Nickname: Cilles
- Colours: Navy and blue
- Grounds: Pairc Ui Rís, Piltown, Bettystown
- Coordinates: 53°41′44″N 6°16′45″W

Playing kits
Standard colours

Senior Club Championships
	All Ireland	Leinster champions	Meath champions
Football:	0	0	0

St Colmcille's GAA (Irish: Naomh Colmcille CLG) is a Gaelic Athletic Association (GAA) club based in Piltown, County Meath, Ireland, mainly incorporating the area of Laytown–Bettystown–Mornington–Donacarney. As of 2026, the club was competing in the Meath Senior Football Championship.

== History ==
St Colmcille's GAA was founded in 1971 through an amalgamation of two east Meath GAA clubs, Stars of the Sea and Shallon. The club moved to their current ground of Pairc Ui Rís in 1989, named in honour of Edmund Rice.

The club has won a number of titles at Junior and Intermediate level, including winning the Meath Intermediate Championship and Leinster Intermediate Championship in 2016.

== Honours ==
- Meath Intermediate Football Championship (2): 1988, 2016
- Leinster Intermediate Club Football Championship (1): 2016
- Meath Junior Football Championship (1): 1983
- Meath Minor Football Championship (6): 1982, 1983, 2016, 2019, 2021, 2025

== Notable players ==
- Bernard Flynn
- Robbie O'Malley
- Niall Ronan
