= 1993–94 National Football League (Ireland) =

Gaelic football competition

League details
- Dates: October 1993 – 1 May 1994

League champions
- Winners: Meath (7th win)
- Captain: Robbie O'Malley
- Manager: Seán Boylan

League runners-up
- Runners-up: Armagh
- Captain: Ger Houlahan
- Manager: Jim McCorry

The 1993–94 National Football League, known for sponsorship reasons as the Church & General National Football League, was the 63rd staging of the National Football League (NFL), an annual Gaelic football tournament for the Gaelic Athletic Association county teams of Ireland.

Meath defeated Armagh in the final.

== Format ==
The 1993/94 format of the National Football League was a system of four divisions of eight teams. Each team played every other team in its division once, either home or away. 2 points were awarded for a win and 1 for a draw.

The top two teams in divisions 2, 3 and 4 were promoted, while the bottom two teams in divisions 1, 2 and 3 were relegated.

Eight teams contested the NFL quarter-finals:

- The top four teams in Division 1
- The top two teams in Division 2
- The winners of Division 3
- The winners of Division 4

== League Phase ==
=== Division One ===
==== Play-Offs ====
20 March 1994 For 3rd Place	Donegal	1-8 — 0-10	Down	Breffni Park
				Attendance: 5,000

27 March 1994 For 4th Place	Down	2-12 — 0-11	Kerry	Croke Park, Dublin

==== Table ====
Team	Pld	W	D	L	Pts	Status
Derry	7	6	0	1	12	Advance to quarter-finals
Dublin	7	4	2	1	10	Advance to quarter-finals
Donegal	7	4	0	3	8	Advance to quarter-finals
Down	7	3	2	2	8	Advance to quarter-finals
Kerry	7	4	0	3	8
Kildare	7	2	1	4	5
Clare	7	1	1	5	3	Relegated
Mayo	7	1	0	6	2	Relegated

=== Division Two ===
==== Table ====
Team	Pld	W	D	L	Pts	Status
Meath	7	5	0	2	10	Promoted to Division One of the 1994–95 NFL and advance to quarter-finals
Laois	7	4	2	1	10	Promoted to Division One of the 1994–95 NFL and advance to quarter-finals
Louth	7	4	1	2	9
Cork	7	4	0	3	8
Leitrim	7	4	0	3	8
Galway	7	3	1	3	7
Roscommon	7	2	0	5	4	Relegated
Fermanagh	7	0	0	7	0	Relegated

=== Division Three ===
==== Play-Offs ====
20 March 1994 For 3rd Place	Tyrone	2-10 — 2-6	Cavan	Brewster Park, Enniskillen

27 March 1994 For 2nd Place	Tyrone	2-10 — 0-10	Wexford	Croke Park

==== Table ====
Team	Pld	W	D	L	Pts	Status
Armagh	7	5	1	1	11	Promoted to Division Two of the 1994–95 NFL and advance to Knockout Phase
Tyrone	7	3	2	2	8	Promoted to Division Two of the 1994–95 NFL
Wexford	7	4	0	3	8
Cavan	7	4	0	3	8
Antrim	7	3	1	3	7
Tipperary	7	3	1	3	7
Monaghan	7	1	2	4	4	Relegated
Offaly	7	0	3	4	3	Relegated

=== Division Four ===
==== Play-Offs ====
20 March 1994 For 1st Place	Westmeath	2-10 — 2-8	Longford	Pearse Park, Longford
				Attendance: 3,000

==== Table ====
Team	Pld	W	D	L	Pts	Status
Westmeath	8	6	1	1	13	Promoted to Division Three of the 1994–95 NFL and advance to Knockout Phase
Longford	8	6	1	1	13	Promoted to Division Three of the 1994–95 NFL
Wicklow	8	6	0	2	12
Sligo	8	3	2	3	8
Carlow	8	4	0	4	8
London	8	2	2	4	6
Waterford	8	3	1	4	7
Limerick	8	2	1	5	5
Kilkenny	8	0	0	8	0

== Knockout phase ==
=== Quarter-finals ===
3 April 1994

Armagh	2-13 – 1-9	Dublin

Breffni Park, Cavan

3 April 1994

Laois	0-8 – 0-7	Donegal

Croke Park, Dublin

3 April 1994

Meath	0-13 – 1-9	Down

Croke Park, Dublin

3 April 1994

Westmeath	3-6 – 0-11	Derry

[Brewster Park] [Enniskillen]

=== Semi-finals ===
17 April 1994

Meath	0-15 – 0-11	Westmeath

Croke Park, Dublin
Attendance: 33,153

17 April 1994

Armagh	3-11 – 1-9	Laois

Croke Park, Dublin
Attendance: 33,153

=== Final ===
1 May 1994
Final

Meath	2-11 – 0-8	Armagh

Croke Park, Dublin
Referee: Thomas McDermott (Cavan)
