= John Mitchels GAA (Louth) =

Louth-based Gaelic games club

John Mitchels
- Seán Mistéal CLG
- Founded: 1957
- County: Louth
- Colours: White and Red
- Grounds: Páirc Seán Mistéal, Ballybailie, Ardee
- Coordinates: 53.88025°N 6.52179°W

Playing kits
Standard colours

John Mitchels GAA is a Gaelic Athletic Association (GAA) club that fields gaelic football teams in competitions organised by Louth GAA. It is based in the townland of Ballybailie, part of the civil parish of Ardee, less than two miles from Ardee town centre.

As of 2023, the club competes in the Louth Junior Championship and Division 3 of the county football Leagues. Former St Nicholas hero Johnny Carter is the manager of the senior team.

== History ==
The club was founded in 1957 and is named after the Irish nationalist John Mitchel. In 1994, the club reached the final of the Louth Intermediate Football Championship, but lost to Lann Léire by 3–08 to 0–07. 1998 saw the Mitchels crowned Louth Junior Football Champions after beating St Bride's. The team also clinched the Double by winning the MacArdle Cup.

In 2015, club member Des Halpenny was elected Chairman of Louth GAA for a five-year period.

In 2021, the club bridged a 23-year gap when qualifying for the Junior Championship final. Opponents Glen Emmets would prove too strong, winning by five points. In July 2023, the Mitchels won the Division 3B League title, securing promotion to Division 3A for 2024.

== Honours ==
- Louth Junior Football Championship (2): 1992, 1998
- Louth Junior A Football League (4): 1981, 1990, 1998, 2025
- Louth Junior 1 Football League Division 3B (1): 2023
- Louth Junior 2A Football Championship (1): 1967
- Kevin Mullen Shield (1): 2002
- Kevin Mullen Plate (1): 2017
- Louth Junior 2 Football League (Division 6) (1): 2018

== Inter-county players ==
John Mitchels players who have represented Louth at senior inter-county level include:

- Stephen Melia
- Brendan Reilly
