= Joe Cassells =

Irish Gaelic footballer

Personal information
- Born: 10 October 1954 (age 72) Navan, County Meath, Ireland
- Occupation: Retired electrical contractor
- Height: 6 ft 1 in (185 cm)

Sport
- Sport: Gaelic football
- Position: Midfield
Club
- Years: Club
- 1972-1992: Navan O'Mahony's
Club titles
	Football	Hurling
Meath titles	8	2
Inter-county
Years	County	Apps (scores)
1974-1990	Meath	43 (1-10)
Inter-county titles
- Leinster titles: 4
- All-Irelands: 2
- NFL: 2
- All Stars: 0

Joe Cassells (born 10 October 1954) is an Irish former Gaelic footballer. His league and championship career with the senior Meath county team spanned sixteen seasons from 1974 to 1990.

Born in Navan, County Meath, Cassells first excelled as a Gaelic footballer at club level with Navan O'Mahony's. In a club career that spanned three decades he won a record eight county senior championship medals. Cassells also won two county senior championship medals as a hurler.

Cassells made his debut on the inter-county scene at the age of seventeen when he was selected for the Meath minor team. He enjoyed one championship season with the minor team, ending the year as a Leinster medal winner. Cassells subsequently joined the Meath under-21 team, however, he enjoyed little success in this grade. He made his debut with the Meath senior team during the 1974 championship. Over the course of the next sixteen years, Cassells won back-to-back All-Ireland medals, beginning in 1987 before collecting a second as captain of the team in 1988. He also won four Leinster medals and two National Football League medals. Cassells played his last game for Meath in September 1990.

As a regular member of the Leinster inter-provincial team on a number of occasions, Cassells won back-to-back Railway Cup medals in 1985 and 1986.

In retirement from playing, Cassells became involved in team management and coaching.

Cassells is the younger brother of trade union leader Peter Cassells.

Their nephew Shane is a politician.

== Career statistics ==
Team	Season	Leinster		All-Ireland		Total	
Team	Season	Apps	Score	Apps	Score	Apps	Score
Meath	1974	2	0-00	0	0-00	2	0-00
Meath	1975	1	0-00	0	0-00	1	0-00
Meath	1976	4	0-00	0	0-00	4	0-00
Meath	1977	3	0-01	0	0-00	3	0-01
Meath	1978	1	0-01	0	0-00	1	0-01
Meath	1979	4	0-00	0	0-00	4	0-00
Meath	1980	2	1-00	0	0-00	2	1-00
Meath	1981	1	0-00	0	0-00	1	0-00
Meath	1982	1	0-00	0	0-00	1	0-00
Meath	1983	2	0-00	0	0-00	2	0-00
Meath	1984	4	0-00	0	0-00	4	0-00
Meath	1985	2	0-00	0	0-00	2	0-00
Meath	1986	3	0-01	1	0-00	4	0-01
Meath	1987	2	0-04	2	0-02	4	0-06
Meath	1988	1	0-00	3	0-01	4	0-01
Meath	1989	3	0-00	0	0-00	3	0-00
Meath	1990	0	0-00	1	0-00	1	0-00
Total		36	1-07	7	0-03	43	1-10

== Honours ==
Navan O'Mahony's

- Meath Senior Football Championship (8): 1973, 1979, 1981, 1985, 1987, 1988, 1989, 1990
- Meath Senior Hurling Championship (2): 1985, 1986

Meath

- All-Ireland Senior Football Championship (2): 1987, 1988 (c)
- Leinster Senior Football Championship (4): 1986 (c), 1987, 1988 (c), 1990
- National Football League (2): 1974-75, 1987-88 (c)
- Centenary Cup (1): 1984 (c)
- Leinster Minor Football Championship (1): 1972

Leinster

- Railway Cup (2): 1985, 1986

Sporting positions
Preceded by	Meath Senior Football Captain; 1986	Succeeded by Mick Lyons
Preceded by Mick Lyons	Meath Senior Football Captain; 1988	Succeeded by
Achievements
Preceded by Mick Lyons	All-Ireland Senior Football Final winning captain 1988	Succeeded by Dinny Allen
