= Michael Maguire (Gaelic footballer) =

Irish Gaelic footballer

Personal information
- Native name: Mícheál Mag Uidhir (Irish)
- Born: 23 August 1965 (age 61) Castlehaven, County Cork, Ireland
- Occupation: Builder
- Height: 5 ft 11 in (180 cm)

Sport
- Sport: Gaelic Football
- Position: Goalkeeper
Club
- Years: Club
- Castlehaven
Club titles
- Cork titles: 2
- Munster titles: 3
Inter-county*
| Years | County | Apps (scores) |
| 1984-1998 | Cork | 2 (0-00) |
Inter-county titles
- Munster titles: 0
- All-Irelands: 0
- NFL: 0
- All Stars: 0
- *Inter County team apps and scores correct as of 19:20, 3 January 2013.

Michael Maguire (born 23 August 1965) is an Irish retired Gaelic footballer who played as a goalkeeper for the Cork senior team.

Maguire joined the team during the 1984 championship and was a regular sub goalkeeper until his retirement after the 1998 championship. During that time he won two All-Ireland medals as a non-playing substitute.

At club level Maguire is a three-time Munster medalist with Castlehaven. In addition to this he has also won two county club championship medals.
