= Denis Walsh (dual player) =

Irish hurling manager and former dual player of Gaelic games

Personal information
- Native name: Donncha Breathnach (Irish)
- Born: 22 January 1965 (age 61) Ballynoe, County Cork
- Occupation: Financial adviser
- Height: 5 ft 10 in (178 cm)

Sport
- Football Position: Corner-back
- Hurling Position: Half-back
Club
- Years: Club
- St Catherine's / Kildorrery
Club titles
	Football	Hurling
Cork titles	2	
Inter-county
Years	County	Apps (scores)
1986–1990 1984–1993	Cork (F); Cork (H)	11 (0–1); 29 (1–9)
Inter-county titles
	Football	Hurling
Munster Titles	4	5
All-Ireland Titles	2	2
League titles	1	1
All-Stars	0	0

Denis Walsh (born 22 January 1965 in Ballynoe, County Cork) is an Irish former dual player of Gaelic games who has also been a manager in both hurling and Gaelic football. He is a former manager of the Waterford senior football team and the Cork senior hurling team.

An effective dual player, Walsh had a successful playing career at club level with St Catherine's and Kildorrery and at inter-county level with Cork. He was a key member of both the Cork football and hurling teams throughout the 1980s and 1990s, winning All-Ireland, Munster and National League titles in both codes.

After some relatively unsuccessful spells as manager of various club sides, Walsh took charge of the Waterford senior football team in 2001. He left after two unsuccessful seasons. Walsh emerged as a surprise contender for the vacant managerial position with the Cork senior hurling team and was duly appointed in March 2009.

== Biography ==
Denis Walsh was born in Ballynoe, County Cork in 1965. He was educated at the local national school where he first played hurling and football. Walsh later attended boarding school in Carrignavar, where his sporting talents were further developed. Walsh currently works as a self-employed financial adviser.

== Playing career ==
=== Club ===
Walsh experienced much success as a dual player while playing his club hurling with St Catherine's and his club football with Kildorrery. He first experienced victory with St Catherine's in 1983 when the club won an Imokilly divisional title. St Catherine's later represented the division in the county championship and defeated Aghabullogue, giving Walsh a county junior championship winners' medal.

In 1984, Walsh was a key member of the Imolkilly divisional football team that competed in the senior county championship. St Finbarr's provided the opposition; however, Imokilly proved too strong and won the game by 1–14 to 2–7. Not only was it Imokilly's first major triumph at senior level but the victory also gave Walsh a county senior championship title.

Two years later, in 1986, Imokilly faced St Finbarr's again in the county final. After a tense game, Imokilly defeated 'the Barrs' by a solitary point, giving Walsh a second county winners' medal in three years.

After a drought of success, 1994 proved to be a bumper year for Walsh at the club level. He won a North Cork junior 'A' football title with Kildorrery, before lining out with St Catherine's in the intermediate hurling county final. Cloughduv provided the opposition; however, Walsh ended up on the winning side with a 3–12 to 2–11 score line.

In the twilight of his club career, Walsh experienced success one final time in 2004. St Catherine's reached the final of the premier intermediate championship. Courcey Rovers provided the opposition; however, St Catherine's won the day with a 1–11 to 1–8 score line. It was Walsh's second winners' medal in that grade and, with that, he retired from club hurling.

=== Minor and under-21 ===
Walsh first came to prominence on the inter-county scene as a footballer at underage levels for Cork. He won a Munster MFC medal in 1983 following a 1–11 to 1–15 defeat of Tipperary. Walsh, however, didn't play in the subsequent All-Ireland final, a game which saw Derry emerge victorious by just two points.

Walsh later joined the Cork under-21 team. 1985 saw him add a Munster U21FC medal to his collection following an eleven-point trouncing of Clare in the provincial final. The subsequent All-Ireland U21FC final saw Walsh play at corner-back against Derry. 'The Rebels' avenged their defeat at minor level two years previously by beating Derry by 0–14 to 1–18. It was Walsh's first All-Ireland winners' medal in the under-21 grade.

In 1986, the Cork under-21 footballers continued their provincial dominance. A narrow 0–8 to 0–7 win over Tipperary gave Walsh his second Munster U21FC winners' medal. He later played in a second successive All-Ireland U21FC final with Offaly providing the opposition. The game was a one-sided affair as the Cork team were the easy winners on a score line of 3–16 to 0–12. It was Walsh's second consecutive All-Ireland U21FC medal, and his last outing in that grade.

=== Senior ===
By this stage, Walsh's hurling skills had been noticed by the Cork senior selectors. Cork retained their provincial dominance in 1986 as the county captured a fifth Munster SFC title in a row. It was Walsh's first Munster SFC winners' medal. Following an unconvincing display by Cork against Antrim, he lined out in the All-Ireland SHC final against Galway. The men from the west were the red-hot favourites against an ageing Cork team; however, on the day, a different story unfolded. Four Cork goals, one from John Fenton, two from Tomás Mulcahy and one from Kevin Hennessy, stymied the Galway attack and helped 'the Rebels' to a 4–13 to 2–15 victory. It was Walsh's first All-Ireland SHC winners' medal.

In 1987, Walsh was a firm fixture on both the Cork senior hurling and football teams. The hurlers surrendered their provincial and All-Ireland SHC titles to Tipperary; however, the footballers were just embarking on a run of success. After a draw and a replay, the Rebels broke Kerry's stranglehold on provincial football with a 0–13 to 1–5 victory. It was Walsh's first Munster SFC title. The subsequent All-Ireland SFC final saw Cork play Meath for the first time in twenty years. Cork gained an early lead; however, it was Meath who led by a point at half-time. The second half saw Larry Tompkins kick six of his eight frees wide, resulting in a 1–14 to 0–11 defeat for Cork.

1988 saw Walsh collect a second Munster SFC title with a narrow 1–14 to 0–16 win over arch-rivals Kerry. Cork later qualified for a second consecutive All-Ireland SFC final with Meath again providing the opposition. After three minutes, Teddy McCarthy scored the only goal of five consecutive All-Ireland final appearances for Cork. Meath fought back and secured a 0–12 to 1–9 draw. Walsh, who was substituted in the drawn game, was not a member of the starting fifteen for the replay. That game proved to be a tough, controversial affair with Meath reduced to fourteen men after Gerry McEntee was sent off. Despite being outnumbered, Meath won the game by 0–13 to 0–12.

1989 saw Walsh winning a third consecutive Munster SFC medal following another win over Kerry. The subsequent All-Ireland SFC final saw Walsh dropped from the team again as Mayo played Cork in a unique pairing. Cork were on top for much of the game; however, a goal by substitute Anthony Finnerty gave Mayo a brief lead. Cork held on to win the game by 0–17 to 1–11.

1990 proved to be a memorable year for Walsh and for Cork. A key member of the senior hurling team, he won a third Munster SHC winners' medal following a great victory over Tipperary, the reigning All-Ireland champions. Not long after this, Walsh was playing in the Munster SFC final. For the fourth year in-a-row Cork were the masters of the province as they trounced Kerry by 2–23 to 1–11. The subsequent All-Ireland SHC final paired Cork with Galway for the second time in four years. Galway were once again the bookies' favourites and justified this tag by going seven points ahead at the interval. Cork fought back with an expert display by Tomás Mulcahy and went on to win a high-scoring and open game of hurling by 5–15 to 2–12. It was Walsh's second All-Ireland SHC medal. Two weeks after this victory, Walsh was back in Croke Park as a member of the Cork football panel that were playing in the All-Ireland SFC final. Old rivals Meath were the opponents on this occasion as the two sides met for the third time in four years. Walsh, however, played no part in the game as the fourteen men of Cork won the game by 0–11 to 0–9. Disappointingly for Walsh, he was not eligible for an All-Ireland SFC medal, even as a substitute. He left the Cork inter-county football team following this.

In 1991, Cork surrendered their provincial hurling crown to Tipperary; however, the following year brought further success for Walsh. The provincial final saw 'the Rebels' defeat Limerick by 1–22 to 3–11, giving Walsh a fourth provincial winners' medal, his fifth in all. Cork later qualified for the All-Ireland SHC final, where Kilkenny provided the opposition. 'The Cats' played against a strong wind in the first half and were only two points down at the interval thanks to a goal by D. J. Carey. Further goals by John Power and Michael Phelan gave Kilkenny a 3–10 to 1–12 victory.

In 1993, Walsh added to his already impressive medal tally as he collected a National Hurling League title following a three-game saga with Wexford. Success in the championship eluded him. That same year, Walsh was also a key member of the Cork junior football panel. He picked up a Munster JFC title, before lining out in the All-Ireland JFC decider. Mayo provided the opposition; Cork, however, had a relatively comfortable 0–15 to 0–7 victory. This was Walsh's last major outing on the inter-county scene. He retired from inter-county hurling in 1996.

=== Inter-provincial ===
Walsh also lined out with Munster in the inter-provincial hurling competition. He won his sole Railway Cup medal in 1992 when Munster defeated Ulster by 3–12 to 1–8.

== Managerial career ==
Denis Walsh
Sport
Club management
- Years: Club
- St Catherine's; Ballyduff; Carrigtwohill; Ballymartle; Ballygunner
Inter-county management
- Years: Team
- 2001–2003 2009–2011: Waterford (F); Cork (H)

While still a player, Walsh became involved in the coaching of various club teams in both hurling and football. In the late 1990s, he served as a hurling coach with his native St Catherine's club before also having a stint with Ballyduff in Waterford. Walsh also worked as manager of the Cork club Carrigtwohill in hurling. Walsh has guided Ballygunner to back-to-back Waterford Senior hurling championships in 2015/16.

=== Waterford ===
In October 2001 Walsh was appointed manager of the Waterford senior football team. It was a tough assignment as Waterford were regarded as one of the minnows of Gaelic football. His first game in charge was a Munster quarter-final against Clare, a game in which Waterford could be contenders for victory in spite of their low profile. A 3–10 to 2–9 defeat sent Waterford into the 'qualifiers'. Waterford also lost their next game and were dumped out of the championship. Walsh was the manager for a second season in 2002. That year, Waterford exited the provincial championship at the first hurdle again, following a defeat by Tipperary. The resultant qualifier game was not kind as Waterford were pitted against reigning All-Ireland champions Armagh. That game turned into an absolute rout as Armagh won easily by 2–21 to 0–8. This defeat brought Walsh's reign as Waterford manager to an end.

=== Cork ===
On 26 March 2009, Walsh was named as the new manager of the Cork senior hurling team. He was installed as a full-time replacement for Gerald McCarthy who vacated the position after a prolonged strike by the entire hurling panel due to the nature of his appointment for a second two-year term. The task ahead was enormous as Cork had missed out on early-season training and the opening two rounds of the National League. Walsh's first two games in charge saw Cork being trounced by Kilkenny before putting up a spirited display against Waterford but eventually recording a defeat.

Walsh's first championship game in charge saw Cork take on Tipperary in Semple Stadium. While many expected Tipp to trounce Cork, Walsh's side fought admirably before eventually losing by 1–19 to 0–19. After a convincing win over Offaly in the opening round of the qualifiers, Walsh's next assignment with Cork was a win-or-bust All-Ireland qualifier meeting with an in-form Galway. After an opening half which saw both sides trade tit-for-tat scores, Galway pulled away in the final ten minutes to record a 1–19 to 0–15 victory, their fifth-ever over Cork.

In 2010, Walsh led Cork to a National League Final appearance, with Cork losing to Galway in the final. In the Championship, Cork lost the Munster Final to Waterford after a replay that went to extra time. Cork went on to reach an All-Ireland semi-final where they were comprehensively beaten by Kilkenny. In 2011, Cork suffered a dismal defeat to Tipperary in the Munster Championship. After beating Laois and Offaly in the qualifiers, Cork were beaten by Galway in their next qualifier game after a dismal performance. In August 2011, the Cork County Committee confirmed that they would not be extending the tenure of Walsh after two and a half years.

== Honours ==
=== Cork ===
- All-Ireland Senior Football Championship:
  - ' Winner (2):' 1989 (sub), 1990 (sub)
  - Runner-up (2): 1987, 1988
- Munster Senior Football Championship:
  - Winner (1): 1987, 1988, 1989, 1990
  - Runner-up (1): 1986
- All-Ireland Senior Hurling Championship:
  - Winner (2): 1986, 1990
  - Runner-up (1): 1992
- Munster Senior Hurling Championship:
  - Winner (5): 1984, 1985 (sub), 1986, 1990, 1992
  - Runner-up (3): 1987, 1988, 1991
- All-Ireland Junior Football Championship:
  - Winner (1): 1993
- Munster Junior Football Championship:
  - Winner (1): 1993
- All-Ireland Under-21 Football Championship:
  - Winner (2): 1985, 1986
- Munster Under-21 Football Championship:
  - Winner (2): 1985, 1986
- All-Ireland Minor Football Championship:
  - Winner (0):
  - Runner-up (1): 1983 (sub)
- Munster Minor Football Championship:
  - Winner (1): 1983

== Statistics ==
=== As a player ===
Performance		NHL		SHC		NFL		SFC		Total	
Season	Team	Apps	Scr	Apps	Scr	Apps	Scr	Apps	Scr	Apps	Scr
1989–90	Cork	7	0–0	5	0–0	5	0–0	1	0–0	18	0–0
1990–91	Cork	5	0–0	1	0–0	—	—	—	—	6	0–0
1991–92	Cork	7	0–0	4	0–0	—	—	—	—	11	0–0
1992–93	Cork	7	0–0	1	0–0	—	—	—	—	8	0–0
1993–94	Cork	7	0–0	—	—	—	—	—	—	7	0–0
1994–95	Cork	2	0–0	—	—	—	—	—	—	2	0–0
Career Total											

=== As a manager ===
As of 5 April 2010

Team	From	To	National League Record					Championship Record				
Team	From	To	P	W	D	L	Win %	P	W	D	L	Win %
Waterford (F)	October 2001	June 2001	14	0	2	12	00.00%	4	0	0	4	00.00&
Cork (H)	26 March 2009	23 August 2011	8	5	1	2	62.50%	3	1	1	1	33.33%

Sporting positions
Preceded by Greg Fives	Waterford Senior Football Manager; 2001–2003	Succeeded by Billy Harty
Preceded by John Considine	Cork Senior Hurling Manager; 2009–2011	Succeeded by Jimmy Barry-Murphy
