= Martin O'Connell (Gaelic footballer) =

Irish Gaelic footballer

Personal information
- Native name: Máirtín Ó Conaill (Irish)
- Born: 29 August 1963 (age 63) Carlanstown, County Meath
- Occupation: Butcher
- Height: 6 ft 1 in (185 cm)

Sport
- Sport: Gaelic football
- Position: Left wing-back
Club
- Years: Club
- 1980s–2000s: St Michael's
Inter-county
- Years: County
- 1984–1997: Meath
Inter-county titles
- Leinster titles: 6
- All-Irelands: 3
- NFL: 3
- All Stars: 4

Martin O'Connell (born 29 August 1963 in Carlanstown, County Meath) is an Irish former sportsperson. He played Gaelic football with his local club St Michael's and was a senior member of the Meath county team from 1984 until 1997. O'Connell was listed on the "An Post/GAA Football Team of the Millennium".

In a senior inter-county career that spanned two decades, O'Connell won every honour in the game at senior level. O'Connell claimed a Meath record of six Leinster and three National Football League titles.

O'Connell has also been the recipient of many awards off the field. He claimed four All Star awards as well as being named Texaco Footballer of the Year in his final playing season in 1996. Shortly after his inter-county career ended O'Connell was named in the left wing-back position on the GAA Football Team of the Millennium.

In May 2020, the Irish Independent named O'Connell as one of the "dozens of brilliant players" who narrowly missed selection for its "Top 20 footballers in Ireland over the past 50 years".

The All-Ireland medal he won in 1987 was stolen during a burglary in November 2020 but retrieved a short time later.

== See also ==
- List of people on the postage stamps of Ireland

Awards and achievements
Preceded by ? ? (Drawn Game)	All-Ireland Senior Football Final; Man of the Match; 1988 (Replay)	Succeeded by ? (?)
Preceded by Paul Curran (Dublin)	Texaco Footballer of the Year; 1996	Succeeded by Maurice Fitzgerald (Kerry)
Sporting positions
Preceded by Robbie O'Malley	Meath Senior Football Captain; 1995	Succeeded by Tommy Dowd
