= Kevin Foley (Gaelic footballer) =

Irish Gaelic footballer, manager, and selector

Personal information
- Native name: Caoimhín Ó Foghlú (Irish)
- Born: 9 January 1960 (age 66) Trim, County Meath, Ireland
- Occupation: Veterinary surgeon
- Height: 5 ft 11 in (180 cm)

Sport
- Sport: Gaelic football
- Position: Right wing-back
Club
- Years: Club
- Trim
Club titles
- Meath titles: 0
Inter-county
Years	County	Apps (scores)
1986–1993	Meath	29 (1–0)
Inter-county titles
- Leinster titles: 5
- All-Irelands: 2
- NFL: 2

Kevin Foley (born 9 January 1960) is an Irish Gaelic football manager, selector and former player. His league and championship career at senior level with the Meath county team spanned eight seasons from 1986 to 1993.

Born in Trim, County Meath, Foley was raised in a family with a strong affinity for Gaelic football. He played competitive Gaelic football during his schooldays at Trim CBS and St Patrick's Classical School in Navan. However, he favored soccer during his studies at University College Dublin. By this stage, Foley played club football with Trim, having begun his club career at juvenile and underage levels. He won a county junior championship medal in 1978.

Despite never having played in the minor, under-21 or junior grades with Meath, Foley was added to the senior panel for the 1986 championship. Over the course of the next seven years, he won two All-Ireland SFC medals as part of a two-in-a-row in 1987 and 1988. Foley also won five Leinster SFC medals and two National Football League medals.

As a member of the Leinster inter-provincial team in 1988, Foley won his sole Railway Cup medal.

In retirement from playing Foley became involved in team management and coaching. He was manager of the Clonard team that won their first county junior championship title in forty years in 2011. Foley also served as a selector with the Meath minor team.

== Career statistics ==
Team	Season	Leinster		All-Ireland		Total	
Team	Season	Apps	Score	Apps	Score	Apps	Score
Meath	1986	0	0–0	0	0–0	0	0–0
Meath	1987	3	0–0	2	0–0	5	0–0
Meath	1988	1	0–0	2	0–0	3	0–0
Meath	1989	3	0–0	0	0–0	3	0–0
Meath	1990	3	0–0	2	0–0	5	0–0
Meath	1991	8	1–0	2	0–0	10	1–0
Meath	1992	1	0–0	0	0–0	1	0–0
Meath	1993	2	0–0	0	0–0	2	0–0
Total		21	1–0	8	0–0	29	1–0

== Honours ==
=== Player ===
Meath

- All-Ireland Senior Football Championship (2): 1987, 1988
- Leinster Senior Football Championship (5): 1986, 1987, 1988, 1990, 1991
- National Football League (2): 1987–88, 1989–90

Leinster

- Railway Cup (1): 1988

=== Manager ===
Clonard

- Meath Junior B Football Championship (1): 2011
