= Tommy Dowd (Gaelic footballer) =

Personal information
- Native name: Tomás Ó Dúda (Irish)
- Born: 25 October 1969 (age 57) Leicester, Leicestershire, England
- Height: 1.55 m (5 ft 1 in)

Sport
- Sport: Gaelic Football
- Position: Centre-forward
Club
- Years: Club
- Dunderry
Inter-county
- Years: County
- 1990–2001: Meath
Inter-county titles
- Leinster titles: 4
- All-Irelands: 2
- All Stars: 4

Tommy Dowd is a former Gaelic footballer who played for the Meath county team.

Wolfe Tones went from the Meath Junior Football Championship to Meath Senior Football Championship winners in the space of four seasons in the early 21st-century, with Dowd joining the club around this time.

== Playing career ==
Dowd enjoyed much success playing inter-county football in the 1990s on the Meath teams managed by Sean Boylan. For Meath he played in the half-forward line or the full-forward line. He played club football for Dunderry. He won 2 All-Ireland Senior Football Championship medals (1996 and 1999) as well as 4 Leinster Senior Football Championship medals and 2 National Football League Medals. He has won 4 GAA All-Stars Awards, three of which came before winning his first All Ireland medal. For the 1996 season Tommy was made captain of an unfancied Meath team. In his victory speech after the Leinster final Tommy told the crowd 'you ain't seen nothing yet'. He was proved right as later on that season Tommy led Meath to the All Ireland earning the All Ireland Final RTÉ 'Man of the Match' award and scoring the decisive goal in that final. Injuries meant Tommy played only a bit part in Meath's 1999 All Ireland win.

== After retirement ==
Following his retirement, Dowd moved into coaching and was a selector under Colm Coyle, who managed Meath from September 2006 to July 2008. He is married with two daughters and runs his own company, Tommy Dowd Oil.

Awards and achievements
Preceded by John O'Leary (Dublin)	All-Ireland SFC winning captain 1996	Succeeded by Liam Hassett (Kerry)
Preceded by ? ? (Drawn Game)	All-Ireland SFC Final; Man of the Match; 1996 (Replay)	Succeeded by ? (?)
