= Shea Fahy =

Irish retired sportsperson

Personal information
- Native name: Sé Ó Fathaigh (Irish)
- Born: 6 October 1962 (age 64) Cong, County Mayo, Ireland
- Occupation: HR director
- Height: 6 ft 2 in (188 cm)

Sport
- Sport: Gaelic football
- Position: Midfield
Clubs
- Years: Club
- Sarsfields; Nemo Rangers
Club titles
- Cork titles: 3
- Munster titles: 2
- All-Ireland Titles: 1
Inter-county
| Years | County | Apps (scores) |
| 1982-1986 1987-1995 | Kildare; Cork | 9 (0-10); 30 (1-18) |
Inter-county titles
- Munster titles: 7
- All-Irelands: 2
- NFL: 1
- All Stars: 2

Shea Fahy (born 6 October 1962) is an Irish Gaelic football coach and former player. At club level he played with Sarsfields and Nemo Rangers and was a member of the Kildare and Cork senior football teams. Fahy usually lined out at midfield.

== Army career ==
Fahy was an officer in the Irish Army. He was based in Collins Barracks, Cork and result leading him to join the Cork team.

== Playing career ==
Fahy first played Gaelic football at club level with the Sarsfields club in Newbridge. After progressing through the various underage teams he went on to win County Championship titles with the club's senior team in 1982 and 1986. By this stage he had also made an impression on the inter-county scene, having joined the Kildare senior football team in 1982. Fahy subsequently transferred to the Nemo Rangers club in Cork and enjoyed a hugely successful period there, culminating with an All-Ireland Club Championship title in 1994. His performances with Nemo earned his inclusion on the Cork senior football team and he won consecutive All-Ireland Championship titles in 1989 and 1990. Fahy was named man of the match in the 1990 All-Ireland final defeat of Meath, before ending the year by being named Footballer of the Year. His other honours with Cork include seven Munster Championship titles and a National League title.

== Coaching career ==
In retirement from playing Fahy has become involved in coaching and team management, most notably with the Erin's Own club.

== Honours ==
Sarsfields

- Kildare Senior Football Championship: 1982, 1986

Nemo Rangers

- All-Ireland Senior Club Football Championship: 1994
- Munster Senior Club Football Championship: 1987, 1993
- Cork Senior Football Championship: 1987, 1988, 1993

Kildare

- Leinster Under-21 Football Championship: 1982

Cork

- All-Ireland Senior Football Championship: 1989, 1990
- Munster Senior Football Championship: 1987, 1988, 1989, 1990, 1993, 1994, 1995
- National Football League: 1988-89

Awards
| Preceded by Teddy McCarthy | Texaco Footballer of the Year; 1990 | Succeeded by Colm O'Rourke |
