= Barry Coffey =

Irish retired Gaelic footballer

Personal information
- Born: 1 March 1965 (age 61) Bishopstown, Cork, Ireland
- Occupation: Business consultant
- Height: 6 ft 1 in (185 cm)

Sport
- Sport: Gaelic football
- Position: Left wing-forward
Club
- Years: Club
- Bishopstown
Club titles
- Cork titles: 0
College
- Years: College
- 1983-1987: University College Cork
College titles
- Sigerson titles: 0
Inter-county
Years	County	Apps (scores)
1984-1994	Cork	25 (3-09)
Inter-county titles
- Munster titles: 6
- All-Irelands: 2
- NFL: 1
- All Stars: 0

Barry Coffey (born 1 March 1965) is an Irish retired Gaelic footballer. His league and championship career with the Cork senior team spanned twelve seasons from 1984 to 1994.

Born in Cork, Coffey was raised in a strong sporting family. His father had been more interested in rugby but had also played Gaelic football with the Lees club. Coffey was educated at Coláiste an Phiarsaigh and first played competitive football with the Bishopstown club at juvenile and underage levels before eventually joining the senior team. During his studies at University College Cork he was a regular on the Sigerson Cup team.

Coffey made his debut on the inter-county scene at the age of seventeen when he was selected for the Cork minor team. He enjoyed two championship seasons with the minor team, culminating with the winning of a Munster medal in 1983. Coffey simultaneously joined the Cork under-21 team and won three successive All-Ireland medals between 1984 and 1986. By this stage he had also joined the Cork senior team, making his debut during the 1983-84 league. Over the course of the next twelve seasons, Coffey won two All-Ireland medals as part of back-to-back triumphs in 1989 and 1990. He also won six Munster medals and one National Football League medal. Coffey's last game for Cork was in November 1994.

== Honours ==
Cork

- All-Ireland Senior Football Championship (2): 1989, 1990
- Munster Senior Football Championship (6): 1987, 1988, 1989, 1990, 1993, 1994
- National Football League (1): 1988-89
- All-Ireland Under-21 Football Championship (1): 1984, 1985, 1986
- Munster Under-21 Football Championship (3): 1984, 1985, 1986
- Munster Minor Football Championship (1): 1983
