= P. J. Gillic =

Irish Gaelic footballer

Sport
- Sport: Gaelic football
- Position: Forward
Club
- Years: Club
- 1970s-1990s: Carnaross
Inter-county
- Years: County
- 1980s-1990s: Meath
Inter-county titles
- Leinster titles: 5
- All-Irelands: 2
- NFL: 2

P. J. Gillic (born 20 May 1967) is an Irish former sportsperson. He played Gaelic football for his local club Carnaross and was a senior member of the Meath county team in the 1980s and 1990s. He won two National League titles in 1988 and 1990 and two All-Ireland titles in 1987 and 1988 with Meath.
