= Colm O'Rourke =

Meath Gaelic footballer, school principal, broadcaster, manager

Personal information
- Born: 31 August 1957 (age 69) Aughavas, County Leitrim, Ireland
- Occupation: Secondary school principal
- Height: 6 ft 2 in (188 cm)

Sport
- Sport: Gaelic football
- Position: Full Forward Line Right
Club
- Years: Club
- 1975–1995: Skryne
Club titles
- Meath titles: 2
Inter-county
Years	County	Apps (scores)
1975–1995	Meath	59 (16–105)
Inter-county titles
- Leinster titles: 5
- All-Irelands: 2
- NFL: 3
- All Stars: 3

Colm O'Rourke (born 31 August 1957) is a Gaelic football manager, former player, retired secondary school principal, sports broadcaster and columnist. His league and championship career at senior level with the Meath county team spanned twenty years from 1975 to 1995.

Born in Aughavas, County Leitrim, his family moved to Skryne in County Meath, where O'Rourke spent his youth. He played competitive Gaelic football during his schooling at St Patrick's Classical School in Navan. O'Rourke first appeared for the Skryne club at underage levels, before winning two county senior championship medals in 1992 and 1993. He gained his Bachelor of Arts degree (1978) and Higher Diploma in Education (1979) from University College Dublin. While studying at University College Dublin he won a Sigerson Cup medal in 1979. He was awarded UCD Alumnus of the Year in Sport in 2016.

O'Rourke made his debut on the inter-county scene when he was picked for the Meath minor team. He later joined the under-21 side but enjoyed little success in these grades. O'Rourke made his senior debut during the 1975–76 league. Over the course of the next twenty years he was a regular member of the starting fifteen and won back-to-back All-Ireland medals in 1987 and 1988. He also won five Leinster medals, three National Football League medals and was named Footballer of the Year in 1991. O'Rourke played his last game for Meath in July 1995.

In retirement from playing O'Rourke combined his teaching career with a new position as a sports broadcaster. His media career began with RTÉ where he worked as a studio analyst with the flagship programme The Sunday Game for over twenty-five years. O'Rourke also managed the Meath senior team between 2022 and 2024, and writes a weekly column for the Sunday Independent.

== Early and family life ==
Despite becoming a Meath county footballer, O'Rourke is not a Meathman by birth; he was born in the small parish of Aughavas within County Leitrim. He moved with his family as a youngster from County Leitrim to County Meath

O'Rourke's son Shane also played with the Meath senior football team, while his nephew Paddy played as a goalkeeper for Meath.

== Playing career ==
As a Gaelic footballer, O'Rourke won two All-Ireland medals with Meath, in 1987 and 1988. He also won five Leinster Senior Football Championship medals and three National Football League titles. His involvement would be considered pivotal for Meath's success against Dublin at this time.

O'Rourke received three All-Star for Meath in 1983, 1988 and 1991. His performance, playing with a bandaged knee, in the Dublin-Meath matches of the summer of 1991 are still recounted in Meath. When playing for Meath he was part of a full forward line of himself, Brian Stafford and Bernard Flynn, often considered to be one of the best full-forward lines of all time.

In May 2020, O'Rourke was included in the Irish Independent's "Top 20 footballers in Ireland over the past 50 years", where he was regarded as inferior to such players as Donegal's Michael Murphy and Tyrone's Seán Cavanagh.

== Management career ==
O'Rourke has managed Simonstown Gaels GFC in Navan, guiding them to two Meath Senior Football Finals in 2003 and 2004, only for the team to lose on both occasions. He also guided the club to its first adult title in 2005 when it won the Meath Football League Division 1.

He led Simonstown Gaels to their very first Senior Championship in 2016 and then again in 2017.

He returned as Simonstown manager for a fourth stint in November 2020, hinting that this would be his last managerial job.

O'Rourke managed Ireland's team that competed in the Compromise Rules competition on two outings, 1998 and 1999.

He ruled himself out of contention to replace Andy McEntee as county team manager in 2022, stating: "My beautiful wife Patricia has a very negative view toward managing the county team and with good reason when you see the upshot of Andy McEntee going and the social media abuse that has taken place. People who put in enormous time at their own expense - it's not like Pep Guardiola getting £15m a year - and then being subjected to that sort of thing by unnamed people. I can't understand how, in a society, we can allow people to abuse others without having given their name and address. It's just a shocking indictment of society in general".

In July 2022, O'Rourke was confirmed as the new manager of the Meath senior football team. O'Rourke led Meath to win the 2023 Tailteann Cup, the second-tier Gaelic football competition, after defeating Down on a scoreline of 2–13 to 0–14. Without a win in the 2024 All-Ireland SFC, and with a ten-point defeat to Louth behind him, O'Rourke ceased to be manager of Meath in August 2024.

== Teaching ==
For 42 years O'Rourke worked at St Patrick's Classical School in Navan, first as a teacher, then later as principal. He also trained the school's Gaelic football team, managing them to numerous successes at provincial and national levels. In October 2022, O'Rourke announced that he would be retiring as principal to focus on his role as manager of the Meath senior inter-county men's team.

Despite his classical education, he has been known to mix up his Latin with his Greek in public.

During the COVID-19 pandemic in the Republic of Ireland, he voiced his disagreement with the then education minister Joe McHugh's plan to delay the Leaving Cert until July as well as his plans to socially distance it. He voiced his concerns on how this would be feasible and on the safety of teachers overseeing the exam.

== Media career ==
O'Rourke started working for RTÉ on The Sunday Game in 1991, and has been a contributed sports columns in the Sunday Independent.

He writes occasional columns for the Sunday Independent on the topic of education.

O'Rourke also is slated to make a cameo role in "The Rising" an Irish film that covers the events of the Easter Rising.

In 2020, O'Rourke was accused of using homophobic language on television.

== Political beliefs ==
O'Rourke is an opponent of the welfare state. He is an anti-communist. He has written about his disapproval of Sinn Féin.

O'Rourke wrote in defence of Phil Hogan after the Oireachtas Golf Society scandal forced the European Commissioner from office, describing Hogan as one of the "good people" and the "constant rage" at his wanderings around three provinces to play golf among other things as "a bit over the top".

== Career statistics ==
Team	Season	Leinster		All-Ireland		Total	
Team	Season	Apps	Score	Apps	Score	Apps	Score
Meath	1976	4	2–9	0	0–0	4	2–9
Meath	1977	0	0–0	0	0–0	0	0–0
Meath	1978	1	0–1	0	0–0	1	0–1
Meath	1979	3	1–9	0	0–0	3	1–9
Meath	1980	2	0–4	0	0–0	2	0–4
Meath	1981	1	0–3	0	0–0	1	0–3
Meath	1982	1	0–1	0	0–0	1	0–1
Meath	1983	2	1–8	0	0–0	2	1–8
Meath	1984	4	2–8	0	0–0	4	2–8
Meath	1985	2	0–4	0	0–0	2	0–4
Meath	1986	3	0–6	1	0–2	4	0–8
Meath	1987	2	1–2	2	1–4	4	2–6
Meath	1988	3	0–2	2	0–9	5	0–11
Meath	1989	3	2–2	0	0–0	3	2–2
Meath	1990	3	3–7	2	0–0	5	3–7
Meath	1991	8	0–5	2	0–1	10	0–6
Meath	1992	1	0–2	0	0–0	1	0–2
Meath	1993	2	0–6	0	0–0	2	0–6
Meath	1994	3	0–2	0	0–0	3	0–2
Meath	1995	2	3–8	0	0–0	2	3–8
Total		50	15–89	9	1–16	59	16–105

Sporting positions
Preceded by	Meath Senior Football Captain; 1990	Succeeded by Liam Hayes
Preceded by Andy McEntee	Meath Senior Football Manager; 2022–2024	Succeeded by Robbie Brennan
Awards
Preceded by Shea Fahy (Cork)	Texaco Footballer of the Year; 1991	Succeeded by Martin McHugh (Donegal)
