= Liam Harnan =

Irish Gaelic footballer

Personal information
- Born: Moynalvey County Meath, Ireland

Sport
- Sport: Gaelic football
- Position: Centre Back
Club
- Years: Club
- Moynalvey
Inter-county
- Years: County
- 1984-?: Meath
Inter-county titles
- Leinster titles: 5
- All-Irelands: 2
- All Stars: 0

Liam Harnan is an Irish former Gaelic footballer who played for the Meath county team. He had much success playing inter-county football in the 1980s & early 90s on the Meath teams managed by Sean Boylan. For Meath he played Centre Back. He played club football for Moynalvey. During his playing career he won 2 Senior All Ireland Medals (1987 & 1988) as well as 5 Leinster medals, 2 National League medals and a Centenary Cup medal (a competition played to celebrate the one hundred anniversary of the GAA). He was forced to sit on the substitutes' bench for most of the 1990 season due to back injury. He was regarded by Meath supporters as a strong player, a good distributor of the ball & very underestimated outside of Meath. He failed to get an All Star despite being a very important part of what most consider to be Meath's greatest ever team. He is a cousin of former Meath teammates Mick Lyons and Padraig Lyons.

Harnan is a brother-in-law of Eamonn Murray. Murray is married to Harnan's sister.
