= Michael McQuillan (Gaelic footballer) =

Irish Gaelic footballer

Personal information
- Native name: Míchéal Mac Uilín (Irish)
- Born: 2 October 1959 (age 67) Julianstown, County Meath
- Occupation: Storeman
- Height: 5 ft 11 in (180 cm)

Sport
- Sport: Gaelic football
- Position: Goalkeeper
Club
- Years: Club
- 1970s–1990s: St Patrick's
Inter-county
- Years: County
- 1980s–1990s: Meath
Inter-county titles
- Leinster titles: 4
- All-Irelands: 2
- NFL: 1
- All Stars: 1

Michael McQuillan (born 2 October 1959 in Julianstown, County Meath) is an Irish former sportsman. He played Gaelic football with his local club St Patrick's and was a senior member of the Meath county team in the 1980s and 1990s.
