= David Beggy =

GAA & Irish rugby union player

Personal information
- Nickname: Jinksy
- Born: County Dublin, Ireland

Sport
- Sport: Gaelic football
- Position: -
Club
- Years: Club
- 1985–2002: Navan O'Mahonys
Inter-county titles
- Leinster titles: 5
- All-Irelands: 2
- NFL: 2
- All Stars: 2

David 'Jinksy' Beggy is an All-Ireland winning Gaelic footballer from County Meath.

Beggy -- who played with his club, Navan O'Mahonys -- won two All-Ireland Senior Football Championships in 1987 and 1988. He also received two all stars while playing for the Meath county team, as well as playing Rugby with Leinster. Having come from a rugby playing background, 'Jinksy' Beggy with no underage pedigree in GAA, burst onto the scene in the summer of 1986 and went on to become a huge favourite with the Meath supporters. David claims to have raced against a greyhound in Shelbourne Park for charity, and won. David ran half the track, while the greyhound ran the full track, his reasoning being the dog had four legs and he only has two. In 2007 RTÉ's Charity You're A Star, David teamed up with other former GAA All Stars, Jack O'Shea and Barney Rock to raise money for the 'Gary Kelly Cancer Support Center' and went on to win the show. David is still involved in Gaelic Football and is currently the manager of the senior football team at St Mary's GAA Club, Leixlip.

== See also ==
- List of players who have converted from one football code to another

== Sources ==
- RTÉ entry
- Hoganstand article
