= Bernard Flynn =

Meath Gaelic footballer

Personal information
- Born: Beamore, County Meath, Ireland
- Height: 5 ft 10 in (178 cm)

Sport
- Sport: Gaelic football
- Position: Left corner-forward
Clubs
- Years: Club
- St Colmcille's; St Joseph's (Laois); Mullingar Shamrocks (Westmeath)
Inter-county
- Years: County
- 1984–1994: Meath
Inter-county titles
- Leinster titles: 5
- All-Irelands: 2
- All Stars: 2

Bernard Flynn (born 26 June 1965) is an Irish former Gaelic footballer who played for the Meath county team. As a teenager he attended secondary school in St Mary's of Drogheda. He enjoyed success play inter-county football in the 1980s and early 1990s on the Meath teams managed by Sean Boylan. For Meath he usually played at corner forward. He played club football for St Colmcille's of East Meath up to the 1991 season when he moved to St Joseph's (Laois) and then to Mullingar Shamrocks (Westmeath).

During his playing career he won two Senior All Ireland medals (1987 and 1988) as well as five Leinster medals, three National League Medals and a Centenary Cup Medal (a competition played to celebrate the one hundred anniversary of the GAA). He won two All Star awards as well.

When playing for Meath he was part of a Full Forward line of Colm O'Rourke, Brian Stafford and himself, widely regarded as one of the best Full forward lines of all time.

He has worked as a GAA pundit for RTÉ.

Flynn managed Mullingar Shamrocks and, in January 2021, he became manager of the Meath under-20 county team.

== Career statistics ==
Team	Season	Leinster		All-Ireland		Total	
Team	Season	Apps	Score	Apps	Score	Apps	Score
Meath	1984	2	0-01	0	0-00	2	0-01
Meath	1985	2	0-03	0	0-00	2	0-03
Meath	1986	3	0-05	1	0-05	4	0-10
Meath	1987	3	0-03	2	0-05	5	0-08
Meath	1988	3	0-10	3	0-01	6	0-11
Meath	1989	2	0-06	0	0-00	2	0-06
Meath	1990	3	2-07	2	2-03	5	4-10
Meath	1991	8	2-14	2	0-07	10	2-21
Meath	1992	1	0-00	0	0-00	1	0-00
Meath	1993	0	0-00	0	0-00	0	0-00
Meath	1994	3	0-06	0	0-00	3	0-06
Total		30	4-55	10	2-21	40	6-76
