= Liam Hayes (Gaelic footballer) =

Irish Gaelic footballer

Personal information
- Occupation: Journalist

Sport
- Sport: Gaelic football
- Position: Midfield
Club
- Years: Club
- 1970s–1990s: Skryne
Inter-county
- Years: County
- 1980s–1990s: Meath
Inter-county titles
- Leinster titles: 5
- All-Irelands: 2
- NFL: 1
- All Stars: 1

Liam Hayes is an Irish former sportsman. He played Gaelic football for his local club Skryne and was a senior member of the Meath county team in the 1980s and 1990s.

- 'Out of Our Skins' author, published 1992, recounting his time as a key member of the Meath Gaelic football team of the late 80s, early 90s and his upbringing in Skryne County Meath. The book also recounts the suicide of his older brother Gerard, in harrowing yet sensitive detail.
