= Terry Ferguson =

Irish former sportsman

Sport
- Sport: Gaelic football
- Position: Defender
Inter-county
- Years: County
- 1980s–1990s: Meath
Inter-county titles
- Leinster titles: 4
- All-Irelands: 2
- NFL: 1
- All Stars: 1

Terry Ferguson is an Irish former sportsman who played Gaelic football for the Gaeil Colmcille CLG club and at senior level for the Meath county team in the 1980s and 1990s.
