= Robbie O'Malley =

Irish Gaelic footballer

Personal information
- Native name: Roibeard Ó Máille (Irish)
- Nickname: Bob
- Born: 10 July 1965 (age 61) Laytown, County Meath
- Occupation: Bank official
- Height: 6 ft 0 in (183 cm)

Sport
- Sport: Gaelic football
- Position: Right corner-back
Club
- Years: Club
- 1980s–2000s: St Colmcille's
Inter-county
- Years: County
- 1984–1995: Meath
Inter-county titles
- Leinster titles: 4
- All-Irelands: 2
- NFL: 2
- All Stars: 3

Robbie O'Malley (born 19 July 1965 in Laytown, County Meath) is an Irish former Gaelic footballer. He played for his local club St Colmcille's and was a senior member of the Meath county team from 1984 until 1995.

Sporting positions
Preceded by	Meath Senior Football Captain; 1994	Succeeded by Martin O'Connell
Awards
Preceded by Brian Stafford (Meath)	Texaco Footballer of the Year; 1988	Succeeded by Teddy McCarthy (Cork)
