= Mick Lyons (Gaelic footballer) =

Irish Gaelic footballer

Personal information
- Native name: Mícheál Ó Laighin (Irish)
- Born: Summerhill, County Meath

Sport
- Sport: Gaelic football
- Position: Full Back
Club
- Years: Club
- Summerhill
Club titles
- Meath titles: 1
Inter-county
- Years: County
- 1979–1992: Meath
Inter-county titles
- Leinster titles: 5
- All-Irelands: 2
- NFL: 2
- All Stars: 2

Mick Lyons is a former Gaelic footballer who played for Summerhill and the Meath county team. He won two All-Ireland medals with Meath in 1987 and 1988 and has also won two All Star awards. He won the Meath Senior Football Championship with Summerhill in 1986. He has generally played at the full-back position for his county.

== Early life ==
Lyons is from Summerhill, County Meath, an area close to the Kildare border. His grandfather Patrick Giles was a long serving TD for Meath. His father Paddy actually played against Meath in the 1949 Leinster Championship for Kildare. On the Meath team of the late 1980s and early 1990s, Mick played alongside his brother Paraic (corner back) & cousin Liam Harnan (centre back). He is also a cousin of another Meath football great, Trevor Giles.

== Playing career ==
=== Meath ===
Lyons made his Championship debut for Meath in 1979 against Kilkenny, playing at centre back. He became well known playing full back for Meath, following other notable Meath full backs Tommy "The Boiler" McGuiness, Paddy O'Brien and Jack Quinn. He was one of the central figures of Seán Boylan's All Ireland winning Meath teams of the late 1980s and early 1990s. Legend has it that on Seán Boylan's first training sessions as Meath Manager, Lyons told Boylan to "put your shyness in your a*se pocket."

Lyons won two Senior All Ireland medals in 1987 and 1988, captaining the team in 1987 (Meath's first win for 20 years), as well as five Leinster medals and two National League medals. He also played on the Meath teams which lost the All Ireland finals of 1990 and 1991. In 1984 he was part of the Meath team which won the Centenary Cup, a competition which was contested to celebrate the GAA's 100 year anniversary. He has won two All Star awards for the full back position in 1984 and 1986. Surprisingly, despite enjoying most of his success after 1986, he failed to get another All Star. Some put this down to his reputation as a "hard man" on the football pitch.

During Lyons' playing career, Meath's greatest rivals were Dublin and Cork. Meath played Dublin in the Leinster Championship most seasons, including four times alone in the famous saga of 1991, and played Cork in the All Ireland finals of 1987, 1988 (where the final went to a replay) and 1990. He retired from the Meath Senior team in 1992 after Meath suffered a surprise defeat to Laois. This marked the end of an era in Meath football with many older players not featuring on the Meath team again. Lyons later served as one of Seán Boylan's selectors of the Meath Team in 1994 and 1995.

In the last game of Meath's four game saga with Dublin in 1991, Dublin were awarded a penalty, which Keith Barr took. Lyons ran alongside Barr while he was taking the penalty, and Barr missed. The penalty was never retaken as it should have been. This incident got much coverage at the time and led to GAA changing the official pitch markings to include a semi circle exclusion zone around where a player takes a penalty from. No players other than the penalty taker are allowed inside this zone while the penalty is being taken.

During Lyons' career, injuries have had an impact. Hopes were very high for Meath for the 1984 season; in 1983 Meath had run Dublin, the eventual All Ireland Champions, very close, being beaten in extra time in a replay and they had won the Centenary Cup at the start of 1984. Meath were geared up for the Dublin game in 1984, but Lyons was missing due to injury (broken wrist) and Meath went on to lose. Again in 1989 Meath faced Dublin without Lyons. He had broken his leg playing club football and missed the season. Meath lost to Dublin and their "three in a row" All Ireland dreams were gone. Between 1984 and 1991, Dublin and Meath met in the championship eight times, of which Dublin won twice. Both of these times Lyons was injured, and in all the remaining he was guarding the square. In the 1991 All Ireland final Lyons had to leave the field with a knee injury, his injury compounding an injury crisis for Meath that day. Meath lost the final to Down.

=== Compromise Rules ===
During his Meath career, Lyons was picked to play in the first three Test Series (1984, 1986 and 1987) for Ireland in Compromise Rules. In the first Compromise Rules match (First Test, 1984 Series) to be played he had to be taken from the field after a tackle from an Aussie rules player. In subsequent matches he was involved in several disagreements with Australian players.

== Post-playing career ==
In recent years, Lyons and his cousin Austin Lyons have been involved in developing Rathcore Golf & Country Club in County Meath.

Achievements
Preceded by Tommy Doyle (Kerry)	All-Ireland Senior Football winning captain 1987	Succeeded by Joe Cassells (Meath)
