= Meath county football team =

Gaelic football team

Meath
- Sport: Football
- Irish: An Mhí
- Nickname(s): The Royals; The Plains men The Boys in Green
- County board: Meath GAA
- Manager: Robbie Brennan
- Captain: Eoghan Frayne
- Home venue(s): Páirc Tailteann, Navan

Recent competitive record
- Current All-Ireland status: SF in 2025
- Last championship title: 1999
- Current NFL Division: 1 (1st in 2026)
- Last league title: 1994
First colours	Second colours

The Meath county football team represents Meath in men's Gaelic football and is governed by Meath GAA, the county board of the Gaelic Athletic Association. The team competes in the three major annual inter-county competitions; the All-Ireland Senior Football Championship, the Leinster Senior Football Championship and the National Football League.

Meath's home ground is Páirc Tailteann, Navan. The team's manager is Robbie Brennan.

The team last won the Leinster Senior Championship in 2010, the All-Ireland Senior Championship in 1999 and the National League in 1994.

== History ==
=== 1895 ===
The first notable Meath team was the Pierce O'Mahony's club from Navan that represented the county in the All-Ireland Senior Football Championship (SFC) final of 1895, in the days when the competition was played between the champion clubs from each county. O'Mahony's lost to Arravale Rovers of Tipperary by 0–4 to 0–3.

Meath achieved its first national success in 1933 by winning the League (NFL) title.

Meath had to wait until 1939 for another appearance in the All-Ireland SFC, this time losing narrowly to Kerry by 2–5 to 2–3 in the final.

=== 1949–1983: Three All-Ireland SFC titles and first decline ===
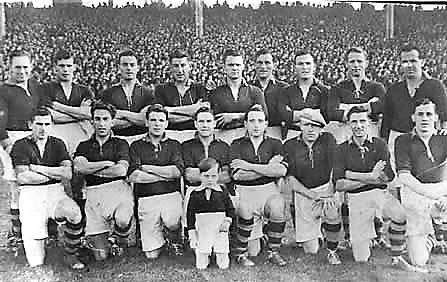
The Meath team that played in the 1939 All-Ireland SFC final

Meath won its first All-Ireland SFC title in 1949, defeating Cavan by 1–10 to 1–6 in the final. This first great Meath team achieved a second All-Ireland SFC title in 1954, defeating by 1–13 to 1–7 Kerry in the final. In between the two, Meath played in two other finals, losing in 1951 — to Mayo — and 1952 – to Cavan. The team also lost to Cavan in the 1949–50 NFL final.

During this period, Meath had a Leinster Senior Football Championship (SFC) rivalry with Louth: in the six editions of that competition held between 1948 and 1953 the teams met each year. 1950 and 1951 were both settled after a replay, while the 1949 match required three games to separate the sides.

Meath's team of the 1960s had a chronic inability to score until after half-time, but might have reached the 1964 All-Ireland SFC final had a goal by Jack Quinn not been controversially disallowed in the All-Ireland SFC semi-final. Meath lost the 1966 All-Ireland SFC final to a Galway team that was winning its third consecutive All-Ireland SFC title.

After the 1966 final defeat, centre-back Bertie Cunningham declared that "next year, we will come back and win the All-Ireland". Sure enough, Terry Kearns helped secured the Sam Maguire Cup with a punched goal in Meath's 1967 final defeat of Cork.

Meath won a fourth NFL title in 1975. Defeat to Kevin Heffernan's Dublin, however, prevented Meath from winning any Leinster SFC titles. This was before Offaly emerged to deny Meath other Leinster SFC titles, as well as to become the only team capable of challenging Kerry's domination of football between 1975 and 1986.

13 consecutive All-Ireland SFC finals were contested by either Dublin or Kerry between 1974 and 1986, a period when one of either team always contested the decider, and 1982 was the only one of those 13 won by another team, which was Offaly.

Meath seemed further than ever from winning another All-Ireland SFC title when losing to Wexford in the 1981 Leinster SFC quarter-final, and to Longford in the 1982 Leinster SFC preliminary round.

=== 1983–2005: Seán Boylan era ===
==== 1983–1990: Fourth and fifth All-Ireland SFC titles ====
By the time the 1983 Leinster SFC had begun, Meath had appointed Seán Boylan — the hurling team's masseur — as football manager, which marked the beginning of the most successful period in Meath's football history.

Boylan's appointment was initially greeted with scepticism; he was thought of as a capable hurler, but his role in football had been seen merely as repairing any players who were broken, not training them. His first task was to prepare team for a Leinster SFC quarter-final match against a Dublin side that was led by midfielder Brian Mullins. The game ended in a draw, after a fortuitous ricochet shot from Barney Rock struck new Meath half-back Colm Coyle. The replay also ended level; Dublin won in extra time, subsequently winning the All-Ireland SFC title that year.

In 1984, the GAA initiated a one-off competition — the Centenary Cup — to celebrate the 100th anniversary of the organisation's foundation. Despite a concerted effort by the then dominant Kerry (winner of four consecutive All-Ireland SFC titles between 1978 and 1981), the Centenary Cup final was contested by Meath and by Monaghan. Meath won, and — when Boylan was asked for comment — he replied that Meath intended to retain the title another hundred years later.

Meath missed full-back Mick Lyons for the 1984 Leinster SFC final (lost to Dublin), then Laois defeated Meath in the 1985 Leinster SFC semi-final. It was therefore not until 1986 that Meath won the first of three consecutive Leinster SFC titles. Then came consecutive All-Ireland SFC final victories over Cork in 1987 and 1988, the latter following a replay. Meath also won a fifth NFL title title, earlier in 1988. The Meath team of 1988 won three major titles: the NFL, the Leinster SFC and the All-Ireland SFC. Dublin defeated Meath's champion team in the 1989 Leinster SFC final, while Cork defeated Meath in the 1990 All-Ireland SFC final.

==== 1991: Leinster saga and All-Ireland SFC final ====
In 1991, the Leinster GAA Council abandoned the seeding system that had kept the previous year's finalists on opposite sides of the Leinster SFC draw. This decision led to Dublin and Meath — opponents in the previous five Leinster SFC finals — being drawn against each other in the 1991 Leinster SFC preliminary round. Meath caught up on a Dublin lead, with a long range shot from PJ Gillic bouncing over the head of Dublin goalkeeper John O'Leary; the result was a draw, so the teams had to meet again. The replay also ended in a draw; extra time was played, but this did not separate the teams either, so a third match was scheduled.

The third meeting of the teams was expected to be close, but — because the Dublin players were younger and more resourceful — as time went on, Dublin were expected to gain the upper hand. The third game, though, also ended in a draw, even after extra time, and a fourth match was required. In the fourth match — an unprecedented third replay, taking place on the same weekend on which the Leinster SFC final had originally been scheduled — Dublin built a better lead than what they had acquired in the previous games. However, an injury time goal from an unlikely scorer — defender Kevin Foley — brought Meath level. With the dynamics now favouring Meath, David Beggy scored a point directly from the restart to win the match, and bring the four-game saga to an end.

Having overcome Dublin, Meath then faced Wicklow in the Leinster SFC quarter-final; that game also ended in a draw, Meath emerging as the winner in another replay. Meath then defeated Offaly (without a replay) in the Leinster SFC semi-final, before overcoming Laois in the Leinster SFC final. Victory over Roscommon in the All-Ireland SFC semi-final set up a meeting with Down in the All-Ireland SFC final.

With each game, injuries to the first team (starting fifteen) were accumulating. Only three Meath players began the 1991 All-Ireland SFC final injury-free, hindering the team's game plan, which required at least eleven players in defined positions. Colm O'Rourke, Meath's star player, was incapable of playing a full seventy minutes. There were insufficient players for replacement. Meath fell far behind in the second half. Meath trailed by eleven points when O'Rourke appeared as a substitute with twenty minutes left to play. He immediately began helping his team to complete the necessary scores; entering injury time, the gap was reduced to two, before Bernard Flynn came within inches of scoring what would have been a winning goal. Down won by a scoreline of 1–16 to 1-14.

==== 1992–1998: Sixth All-Ireland SFC title ====
The 1992 Leinster SFC began (and ended) with a three-point preliminary round home defeat to Laois; many Meath players then retired from inter-county football.

Meath won a seventh NFL title in 1994, with Robbie O'Malley of St Colmcille's captaining the side to victory over Armagh in the final. However, Meath's season came to an end with a loss to Dublin in the 1994 Leinster SFC final, and the last of the team of 1986–94 retired.

For 1995, a new team — consisting of young players such as Trevor Giles and Graham Geraghty — was formed. A ten-point defeat to Dublin in the 1995 Leinster SFC final ended the team's season.

Meath unexpectedly advanced to the 1996 Leinster SFC final, where — again — the opponent was Dublin. Ahead by 0–10 to 0–8 in the driving rain at the death, a ball was lobbed towards the Meath goal. As the ball travelled through the air, the referee blew his whistle and awarded a free out because of pushing by Dublin players. The game concluded: Meath had won another Leinster SFC title. In defeating a consistent Tyrone side in the All-Ireland SFC semi-final, Seán Boylan led a team that had won nothing in 1995 to the 1996 All-Ireland SFC final. Meath came from six points behind to draw with Mayo. In the replay, the teams lost a player each — sent off after a brawl in the early part of the game; Meath came from behind again, defeating Mayo by a scoreline of 2–9 to 1–11 and winning a sixth All-Ireland SFC title. Captain Tommy Dowd, who was living in the Meath Gaeltacht, produced probably the longest victory speech ever given by a Leinster captain.

Meath started the 1997 Leinster SFC against a Kildare team coached by Mick O'Dwyer. Meath's previous record against Kildare had been excellent and Meath were expected to be capable of dealing with Kildare's superior fitness. O'Dwyer's appointment had brought about an enormous increase in support for Kildare, and ensured that the opening match had full attendance at Croke Park, with Kildare fans outnumbering Meath fans. A few years earlier Meath had been one of the best supported county teams, but the team's supporters had become accustomed to success under Boylan and no longer travelled to big games in large numbers. The match saw Kildare emerge displaying an unexpected quality of football. Kildare led for most of the match; the Meath forwards had difficulty negotiating the opposition defence and their team only drew level in the last minute.

The replay ended with the teams level after ordinary time, so extra time was necessary to decide a winner. In extra time Kildare running on the never-ending engine of Willie McCreery in midfield quickly brought about a six-point lead. It seemed as if Kildare's fitness had run Meath into the ground. Then came Boylan's tactical masterstroke, introducing substitute Jody Devine. Devine scored six points in rapid succession, helping Meath to a one-point lead. Kildare, however, grabbed a freakish point to end the match in yet another draw. The teams met in a third match. The weather had changed and the match was played in rain. Meath won; as in 1991 though, this sequence of matches had caused an accumulation of injuries. Meath did not have a meaningful defence in the Leinster SFC final, and the forwards of opponent Offaly took advantage, ending Meath's season.

Meath's performance in the 1998 Leinster SFC quarter-final victory over Offaly was like the effect of an unwound spring. A defeat of Louth in the Leinster SFC semi-final followed. However, fellow Leinster SFC finalist Kildare — playing again with advanced fitness levels — had defeated a transitional Dublin side in one of the other quarter-finals. Meath's Brendan Reilly was sent off in the decider for a dangerous foul on Kildare centre-back Declan Kerrigan. Kildare's superior fitness allowed the team's players to advance in waves, causing problems for Meath. Kildare had also learnt from the year before, and secured greater more well-taken scores. 14-man Meath, by contrast, were collapsing under the physical strain of the match. Kildare held onto the lead. A last attack by Meath was halted by a questionable refereeing decision, which allowed Kildare to swiftly move the ball downfield. Due to Kildare's numerical superiority, this gave the team a chance to expose gaps in the Meath defence; the goal that followed sealed the match in Kildare's favour, and ended Meath's season.

==== 1999–2005: Seventh All-Ireland SFC title and last All-Ireland SFC final ====
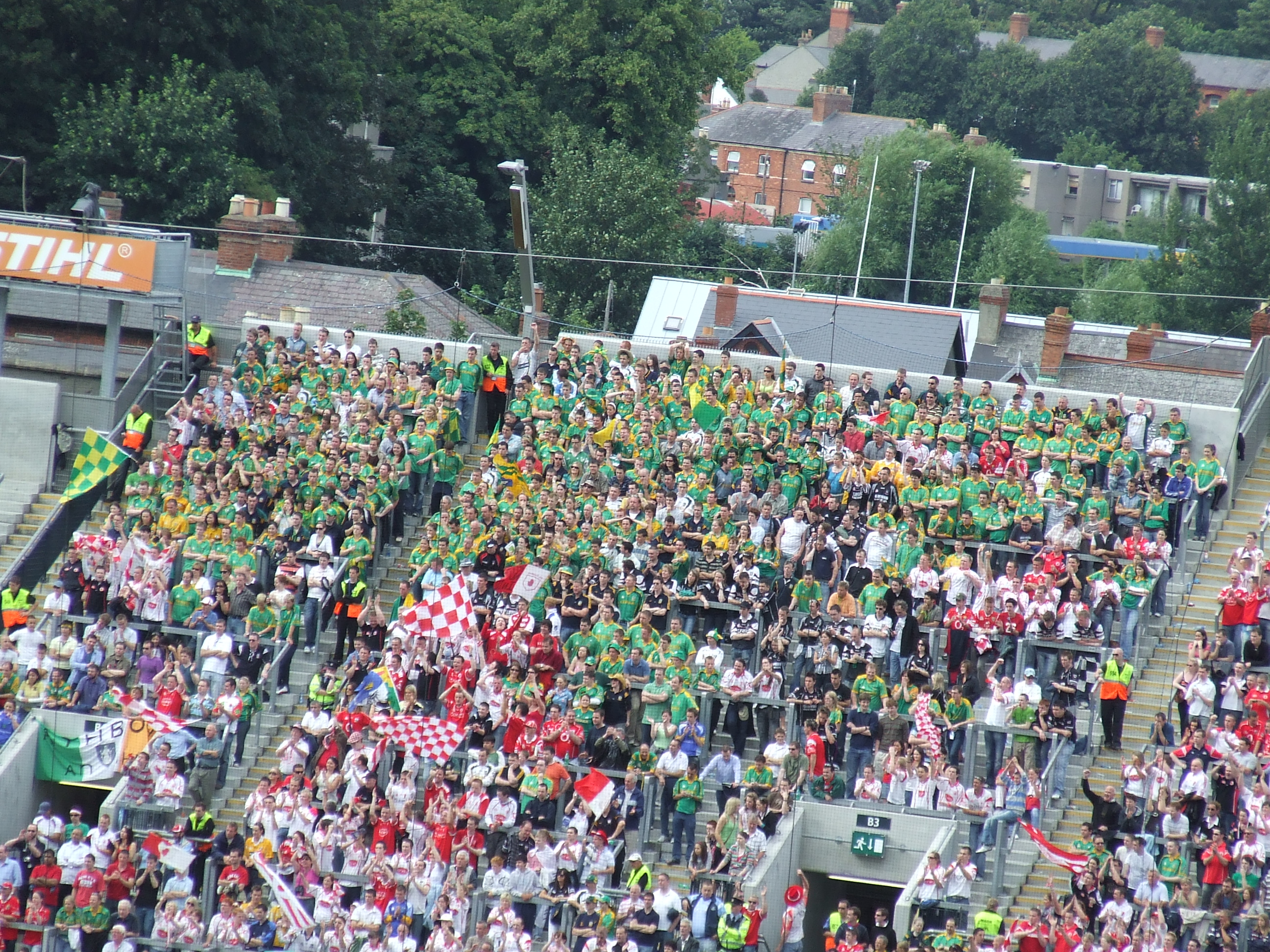
Meath supporters (in the green and yellow) attend an All-Ireland SFC qualifier game against Tyrone.

In 1999, Meath fielded new players partially to overcome the loss of Tommy Dowd, and partially to introduce some badly needed pace in an attempt to compete with the improved fitness level of opponents. As in 1996, Meath were expected to end the season early and empty-handed. Intead, Meath won the 1999 Leinster SFC title, with emphatic victories over Wicklow (2-10 to 0–6; quarter-final), Offaly (1-13 to 0–9; semi-final) and Dublin (1-14 to 0-12; final).

Meath thus qualified for an All-Ireland SFC semi-final against Armagh. In the first half, Armagh had two incisive moves that opened up the Meath defence, leading to goals for Diarmaid Marsden and half-back Hughes. However, in the second half, the Meath defence kept a much tighter rein on the Armagh forwards, and when Armagh's full-back Ger Reid, who had muted the attacking presence of Graham Geraghty, was sent off for persistent fouling, Meath took control. Right half-forward Evan Kelly contributed 0–3 from play to assist his team's 0–15 to 2–5 win.

Meath advanced to the 1999 All-Ireland SFC final, with Cork — rival of a decade previous — the opponent. Cork — captained by nineteen-year-old right corner-forward and free-taker, Philip Clifford — had defeated Kerry in the Munster SFC final by a 2–10 to 2-4 scoreline, and Connacht SFC winner Mayo in the All-Ireland SFC semi-final by a 2–12 to 0–12 scoreline. Meath and Cork exchanged early scores, but Meath had a half-time lead (of 1–5 to 0–5), with the help of an Ollie Murphy goal midway through the first half. The second half opened with Meath's Trevor Giles missing an early penalty, which — had it been converted — would have put six points between the sides. Cork then carried the ball downfield from Giles's penalty rebound to score a point and reduce the deficit to 0–2. Two minutes later, Cork centre-half-forward Joe Kavanagh — winning the ball on the Meath forty — went on a solo run, beating three Meath defenders, giving and taking a return pass, before firing a twenty-yard shot past the diving Cormac Sullivan into the roof of the Meath net. Having briefly glimpsed the possibility of a six-point lead only five minutes before, Meath instead fell behind for the first time, with the score at 1–6 to 1–5. Meath regrouped to outscore Cork by 0–6 to 0–2 in the final quarter, with the performances of Graham Geraghty (who scored 0–3 from play to eclipse Cork full-back Seán Óg Ó hAilpín), Trevor Giles and John McDermott of particular note. With a result of 1–11 to 1–8, Meath had won a seventh All-Ireland SFC title.

Meath played Westmeath in the 2001 Leinster SFC quarter-final, an opening game which ended in a late one-point victory for Meath. In the Leinster SFC semi-final, Meath convincingly defeated Kildare by 1–16 to 0-11, before defeating Dublin by 2–11 to 0–14 in the Leinster SFC final. With 2001 the inaugural year of a revised All-Ireland qualifier system however, Meath met Westmeath again in the newly introduced All-Ireland SFC quarter-final. Another Meath win was anticipated, Meath never having lost a championship match this opponent. However, Westmeath showed great tactical awareness, superior fitness, and an eagerness to play fast open football, and — for much of the game — this caused problems for a Meath defence which at club level was better prepared for direct football and man-for-man marking. Poor Meath defending and a somewhat fortuitous goal had Westmeath on the brink of a three-point victory until — amid a melee of players at Croke Park's Canal End late into injury time — Ollie Murphy gained possession of the ball and, from a distance of 15 metres, unleashed a rasping shot into the top right hand corner of the Westmeath net. The strangest thing of all was that Murphy did not look at where he was kicking the ball — he literally shot based on where he assumed there was a vacant position in the goal. With the game ending level, a replay was required to separate the teams; Meath won by four points.

Kerry awaited Meath in the 2001 All-Ireland SFC semi-final. Kerry's experience, its tradition and the presence of such players as Maurice Fitzgerald, coupled with Meath's habit of cutting things a bit fine, led to expectations that Kerry would win. Manager Páidí Ó Sé had a number of his 2000 All-Ireland SFC title holders available. Three first-half points from Ollie Murphy — Murphy presenting difficulties for Kerry's Michael McCarthy — and a John McDermott goal helped Meath to a half-time lead of 1–6 to 0–4. In the second half, Meath outscored Kerry by 1–8 to 0–1. Such was Meath's dominance in the ten minutes after half-time that a point-scoring spree ensued, finishing the game as a contest with 20 minutes or so left to play, and bringing about an unprecedented sight: that of Kerry fans leaving in their droves long before the full-time whistle; the result was 2–14 to 0–5.

Galway — Meath's opponent in the 2001 All-Ireland SFC final — had only beaten Derry. Meath therefore entered this decider as the overwhelming favourite. It was a careful and cautious match, tied 0-7 each at half-time, while Darren Fay was keeping Galway full-forward Pádraic Joyce scoreless. With Joyce switched to corner-forward at half-time, Galway quickly built up an early lead in the second half. Meath centre half-back Nigel Nestor was sent off for a second bookable offence — a foul on Jarlath Fallon — before Ollie Murphy, who was the most effective Meath forward that day, sustained a broken hand after being trod upon. As the match was slipping away from Meath, John McDermott advanced on the Galway defence, and this led to Meath being awarded a penalty. Meath free-taker and captain Trevor Giles was allocated the responsibility. His effort drifted wide, and with it a chance for Meath to get back into the game. From there, Pádraic Joyce continued to bedevil the Meath defence — eclipsing Mark O'Reilly in doing so — the Meath management all too belatedly sought to rectify the problem by putting Darren Fay back on Joyce, and Galway ran out emphatic victors on a 0–17 to 0–8 scoreline.

The seasons from 2002 onwards saw the re-emergence of Dublin as championship competitor, as well as the appearances of — first — a Laois team that won the 2003 Leinster SFC title, and — then — a Westmeath team that won the 2004 Leinster SFC title. In 2002, 2003 and 2004, many Meath players retired or left the team. In 2005, Seán Boylan announced that he would not be seeking re-appointment as Meath manager.

==== Lament for Boylan ====
Boylan's 22-year term represents a record in modern GAA. He led two different teams to win four All-Ireland SFC titles, while coming close to winning another two. He introduced an increased tactical awareness to the game. He built two All-Ireland SFC-winning teams' other managers like Dwyer, Harte, McGuinness, McGrath, Gavin built only one, who had underage success to build a team upon. With the 1987 and 1988 Meath team, Boylan had no underage success build on. In the history of game it is rare to win an All-Ireland with no underage success. His 1996 team came from nowhere to win an All-Ireland. Since 1950 the only other times for this to have happened were in 1960 (Down), 1974 (Dublin), 1975 (Kerry), 1991 (Down) and 1998 (Galway). What was so unique about 1996 was Seán Boylan's team is one of the youngest teams ever to win All-Ireland, with seven under-21 Meath players playing in the final. This has only happened once before when Kerry won the All-Ireland in 1975 with several under-21 players. Kerry 1975 and Meath 1996 are the two youngest teams to win an All-Ireland.

Dublin are rarely beaten in the Leinster SFC, and even less rarely beaten in Leinster SFC finals. Strong football counties like Westmeath and Laois have never beaten Dublin in a Leinster SFC final. Kildare have beaten Dublin in one Leinster SFC final in the last 90 years since 1930. Seán Boylan's Meath defeated Dublin in seven Leinster SFC finals in 15 years. Meath defeated Dublin in the Leinster SFC finals of 1986, 1987, 1988, 1990, 1996, 1999 and 2001. Meath under Boylan became the top football county in Ireland between 1986 and 2001. In that period (1986–2001), and with two different teams, Meath won four All-Ireland SFC titles, played in seven All-Ireland SFC finals, won eight Leinster SFC titles and won three National League Division 1 titles.

Meath's Leinster SFC title win in 1986 was significant. Dublin — the capital, and Ireland's most populated county — had ten times the population of Meath. Dublin were kingpins of Leinster since 1974. Dublin had won 10 of the previous 12 Leinster SFC titles. Dublin were seen as almost unbeatable in Leinster at the time. But Boylan's Meath knocked Dublin from their perch. And not only did this, but went on to become the top football county in Leinster and Ireland for the next 15 years, replacing Kerry after 1987 as the number one county.

=== 2006–2009 ===
Eamonn Barry replaced Boylan. Barry had managed his Dunshaughlin club to two consecutive Leinster Club SFC titles. He had previously contested the position of manager against Boylan on an almost annual basis. After one season, Barry was replaced as manager by Colm Coyle. Coyle — a three-time All-Ireland SFC-winning player — was a selector under Boylan and had managed the Monaghan county team, winning his first match against then All-Ireland SFC title holder Armagh.

A 2007 Leinster SFC quarter-final against old rival and reigning two-time Leinster SFC title holder Dublin saw Meath come away from Croke Park with an unexpected draw, inspired by Graham Geraghty, Mark Ward, captain Anthony Moyles and Caoimhín King. A narrow defeat in the replay meant participation in the All-Ireland SFC qualifiers, with Meath emerging from this run of "back-door" wins to face Tyrone in an All-Ireland SFC quarter-final game. Meath won, but then lost to Cork in the All-Ireland SFC semi-final.

Meath comprehensively defeated Carlow in the 2008 Leinster SFC preliminary round. Against Wexford in the Leinster SFC quarter-final, Meath lost a ten-point half-time lead, fell behind in injury time and lost the game. Limerick then heavily defeated Meath in an All-Ireland SFC first round qualifier, and Colm Coyle resigned as manager. On 10 November 2008, after a meeting of Meath County Board, Eamonn O'Brien was confirmed as Coyle's successor.

Meath lost to Dublin in the 2009 Leinster SFC quarter-final. The team then embarked on a run of All-Ireland SFC qualifier games, playing Waterford, Westmeath, Roscommon, and — for a second successive year — Limerick. Meath began that game well, with a goal by Cian Ward. Limerick performed well just before full-time two goals from Seannie Buckley and second from substitute Jim O'Donovan sealed the game to one point but was all too late for Limerick. Meath advanced to an All-Ireland SFC quarter-final against Mayo on 9 August, a closely fought game until Meath steered clear in the second half, winning by a score of 2–15 to 1–15. Meath played Kerry in the 2009 All-Ireland SFC semi-final in poor and slippery conditions on 30 August. Both teams made errors. Kerry captain Darran O'Sullivan scored an early penalty, awarded for a foul on Colm Cooper. Kerry built a lead in the next 20 minutes. Meath drew closer as half-time approached. For the second half, Kerry manager Jack O'Connor introduced Tommy Walsh, who scored 1–2 in quick succession. Kerry went eight points ahead. Meath rallied late, but lost by four in the end.

=== 2010 ===
Meath defeated Offaly 2010 Leinster SFC preliminary round. The Leinster SFC quarter-final against Laois at a rain soaked Croke Park went to extra-time but the teams still finished level. Meath won the replay, then defeated Dublin for the first time since 2001 to reach the 2010 Leinster SFC final, a game against Louth, which was played on 11 July 2010. Meath won, but both the way the match ended and the reaction of some Louth supporters proved controversial.

Deep into injury time in the 74th minute of the match, the referee — after a brief consultation with only one of the match umpires — awarded a goal to Meath. Television coverage of the game proved that the ball was carried over the line by Meath player Joe Sheridan. Meath had trailed by one point until this, and — with the referee blowing his whistle shortly afterwards — that goal proved to be the decisive score.

Irate Louth fans stormed the pitch and commenced a process of chasing and physically assaulting the referee, who had to be led away by a Garda escort in scenes broadcast to a live television audience. Other scenes of violence saw bottles being hurled from a stand, one striking a steward who fell to the ground and Meath substitute Mark Ward was hit by a Louth fan. The situation led to much media debate in the days that followed, the violence was condemned and there were many calls for the game to be replayed in the national Media (including former Meath players Trevor Giles and Bernard Flynn.). GAA President Christy Cooney said the events were a "watershed" and one where the "circumstances were bizarre. I have never seen circumstances like it as long as I have been a member of this Association". He promised life bans for those who assaulted the referee.

The day after the match the GAA released a statement confirming that Sludden admitted he had made an error. The GAA also stated that the rules left it powerless to offer a replay and that this would be decided by Meath, Following a Meath County Board meeting, it emerged that in his match report that the referee had originally blown for a penalty for Meath, but when the ball ended in the net decided to award the goal. The county board decided not to offer of a replay and that that would be "the end of the matter".

Meath faced Kildare in the 2010 All-Ireland SFC quarter-final, a game Kildare won by 2–17 to 1–12.

In September 2010, speculation began over whether or not Eamonn O'Brien would continue as manager for 2011. On 7 September 2010, O'Brien was surprisingly axed as manager after the club's board voted him out.

On 10 November 2010, former Monaghan manager Séamus McEnaney was confirmed as O'Brien's replacement. His appointment as manager meant that, for the first time, a non-native of Meath took charge of the county team.

=== 2011–present: Dublin dominance ===
Meath's 2011 Leinster SFC campaign began and ended with a quarter-final defeat to Kildare, a repeat fixture from the same stage of the previous year's competition. Meath entered the 2011 All-Ireland SFC qualifiers, defeating Louth by nine points (5–8 – 2–8) in Round 1 at Breffni Park in Cavan. A single-point victory over Galway in Round 2 set up a second championship meeting of the season with Kildare in Round 3, at which stage Meath's campaign ended in a 2–11 to 0–14 defeat.

The 2012 National Football League began with Meath, despite a good start, being relegated to Division 3 after a home loss to Louth. Soon after this, McEnaney's position as Meath manager came into question. Despite many voting to axe him he survived the vote after clubs opted for him to stay. Meath's 2012 Leinster SFC campaign began in the preliminary round, against Wicklow at a sunny and hot Dr Cullen Park on 27 May. Wicklow had a 0–5 to 0–0 after 14 minutes. However, Meath rallied and outscored Wicklow by 0–16 to 0–11, advancing to play Carlow in the Leinster SFC quarter-final. Carlow took the lead just before half-time. Just as Meath seemed to have won the game, JJ Smith of Carlow hit a late goal to force a replay. Meath's performance in the replay was much improved, with a 2–21 to 1–9 result setting up a Leinster SFC semi-final against Kildare. Meath advanced to the Leinster SFC final, meeting Dublin in the decider for the first time since 2001. Dublin began the better, Meath then brought the score level, but Dublin narrowly won the game by 2–11 to 1–11. Meath faced Laois in a rain soaked O'Connor Park, with Laois winning by 1–15 to 1–12. McEnaney subsequently resigned as Meath manager. In October 2012, Mick O'Dowd was confirmed as his successor.

Meath began the 2013 National Football League poorly, but there was a marked improvement during the latter part of the campaign. Meath earned promotion back to Division 2, though lost to Monaghan in the final. The 2013 Leinster SFC began with a repeat fixture from the previous year — though this time a quarter-final — as Meath faced Wicklow at a very wet and windy Aughrim. Meath won by five points on a scoreline of 1–17 to 1–12. Meath then defeated Wexford by 0–18 to 0–13 in the Leinster SFC semi-final at Croke Park. Meath advanced to the 2013 Leinster SFC final against Dublin, a game that was played in a sunny scorched Croke Park on July 14m, The game was quite a battle, but Dublin claimed the Leinster SFC title by a scoreline 2–15 to 0–14. Meath entered the fourth round of the All-Ireland SFC qualifiers against Tyrone. Although Mickey Newman and Eamonn Wallace scored a goal each, Tyrone ended Meath's 2013 season with a 0–17 to 2–9 defeat.

The next season started very mixed during the 2014 league with Meath missing out promotion. The 2014 Leinster SFC began with a game against Carlow, a repeat of the 2012 Leinster SFC quarter-final, But the game proved to be a real one sided display with the scoreline ending Meath 7–13 to Carlow 0–6. Meath played Kildare in the semi-final without Meath getting the good start leading well at half time but ended up just hanging on at the end on a scoreline 2–17 to 0–16 to advance to a third consecutive Leinster SFC final. The Leinster SFC final took place on 20 July, The game however proved to be a dreadful display for Meath eventually being humiliated by Dublin 3–20 to 1–10. Meath entered the fourth round of the Qualifiers against '2002 All Ireland Champions' Armagh at a rain-soaked Croke Park which showed little improvement from Meath, during which they trailed 0–8 to 0–2 after 8 minutes but managed to claw their way back and were behind 0–8 to 0–7 at half time. The second half saw both teams struggle to finds range due to difficult conditions. Eventually Armagh ended Meath's 2014 Football Championship campaign with the scoreline 0–18 to 0–13.

The following season, Meath had quite a good 2015 league. Despite falling short of Galway, Roscommon and Laois, Meath had some decent results against Kildare, Down, Westmeath and a two-point victory over Cavan in Division 2, only to miss out once again on promotion to Division 1. In the 2015 Leinster SFC quarter-final at a sun scorched Páirc Tailteann in Navan, Meath defeated Wicklow by 2–19 to 3–12. Mth led by eight points (2–12 to 1–7) at half-time in the Leinster SFC semi-final against Westmeath. However, in the second half, black cards were given to both Donnacha Tobin and Graham Reilly, before Westmeath scored 2–8 without reply to defeat their neighbours for the first time ever meeting in a championship game with Meath ending with 14 men after goalkeeper Paddy O'Rourke was shown a straight red card for knocking Kieran Martin to the ground. The result was 3–19 to 2–18, sending Meath to the All-Ireland SFC qualifiers. Meath faced Tyrone in Round 2B at a rain soaked Healy Park, Omagh. Meath led 0–4 to 0–3 at half-time, but lost by a two points during the second half thanks to a Peter Harte penalty: 1–10 to 0–11 the final score, thus ending Meath's 2015 season. It was announced that Mick O'Dowd would continue as Meath manager for a further two years, with a review after the 2016 season.

One commonly reported suggestion for the decline in Meath football was the advent of the Celtic Tiger, held to have softened the players the county produced.

The disappointing season of 2016 proved to be fatal in terms of O'Dowd's managerial career. Failure to land promotion to Division 1 in the league yet again, resulted in huge pressure on O'Dowd and his players to have a successful championship in the summer of 2016. Meath survived a tough test in Parnell Park by beating Louth on a scoreline of 0–20 to 1–13. This set up a Leinster SFC semi-final date with Dublin at Croke Park. A much-fancied Dublin team sent O'Dowd's men into the All-Ireland Qualifiers for the sixth consecutive year. Meath were drawn away to Derry, a game which finished 1–14 to 1–11 in Derry's favour and ended Meath's season. O'Dowd called time on his inter-county management career as a result of this defeat.

Andy McEntee came then.

The 2017 Leinster SFC began with a quarter-final against Louth. It ended with a semi-final against Kildare.

The 2018 Leinster SFC began and ended with a quarter-final against Longford.

The 2020 Leinster SFC, delayed by the impact of the COVID-19 pandemic on Gaelic games, began with a quarter-final against Wicklow; Meath scored seven goals, including a hat-trick by Jordan Morris. Meath defeated Kildare in the Leinster SFC semi-final, with a goal each from Mathew Costello, Jordan Morris, Cillian O'Sullivan, Joey Wallace and Jason Scully, and the result led to suggestions in the media that Meath had a better chance against Dublin in the final than in previous years. But Dublin won a tenth consecutive Leinster SFC title and a 15th in 16 years, with a 21-point defeat of Meath.

The 2021 Leinster SFC began with a quarter-final against Longford; this time Meath won. It ended with a semi-final against Dublin.

The 2022 Leinster SFC began with a quarter-final against Wicklow. It ended with another semi-final against Dublin.

McEntee left after Meath exited the 2022 All-Ireland SFC.

In July 2022, Colm O'Rourke was announced as McEntee's replacement. Shortly after being appointed, O'Rourke wrote that former manager Seán Boylan (winner of four All-Ireland SFC titles during the 1980s and 1990s) would have "open access to the team as adviser, counsellor, motivator or whatever else he wants to be". Meath subsequently won the 2023 Tailteann Cup, the second-tier Gaelic football competition, defeating Down by a scoreline of 2–13 to 0–14 in the final.

Without a win in the 2024 All-Ireland SFC, and with a ten-point defeat to Louth behind him, O'Rourke ceased to be manager of Meath in August 2024.

Meath unexpectedly defeated Dublin in the 2025 Leinster SFC semi-final. That win came after nine consecutive defeats and was a first against Dublin since 2010. In Group 2 of the 2025 All-Ireland SFC, Meath defeated Kerry for only the third ever time in championship football, which meant 2025 was the second time Meath had defeated both Dublin and Kerry in the same season, having also achieved this feat in the 2001 SFC. RTÉ inaccurately reported that it was the first time Meath had achieved this double in the same year. Meath then unexpectedly defeated Galway, with Jordan Morris scoring 1–6 as his team qualified for a first All-Ireland SFC semi-final since 2009. Meath then exited the championship with a twenty-point defeat in the 2025 All-Ireland SFC semi-final, including allowing three of Donegal's attempts on goal to strike the back of the net. Such was the dominance of Jim McGuinness's team that he could afford to substitute Michael Murphy with 25 minutes of play remaining. Donegal's defeat of Meath was the most comprehensive in an All-Ireland SFC semi-final since Cork's twenty-point victory against Mayo in 1993 and no defeat had been more severe at this stage of the competition since Monaghan's loss to Kerry in 1979.

Meath entered the 2026 Leinster championship as favorites, avoiding both reigning champions Louth and Dublin on their side of the draw, but fell at the first hurdle losing to Westmeath by 5 points.

== Panel ==
Team as per Meath vs Donegal in the 2025 All-Ireland Senior Football Championship semi-final, 13 July 2025:

No.	Player	Position	Club
1	Billy Hogan	Goalkeeper	Longwood
2	Séamus Lavin	Right corner-back	Dunboyne
3	Seán Rafferty	Full-back	Na Fianna
4	Ronan Ryan	Left corner-back	Summerhill
5	Donal Keogan	Right half-back	Rathkenny
6	Seán Coffey	Centre-back	Ballinabrackey
7	Ciarán Caulfield	Left half-back	Trim
8	Bryan Menton	Midfield	Donaghmore Ashbourne
9	Adam O'Neill	Midfield	Wolfe Tones
10	Conor Duke	Right half-forward	Dunshaughlin
11	Ruairí Kinsella	Centre-forward	Dunshaughlin
12	Keith Curtis	Left half-forward	Rathkenny
13	Jordan Morris	Right corner-forward	Kingscourt Stars
14	Mathew Costello	Full-forward	Dunshaughlin
15	Eoghan Frayne (c)	Left corner-forward	Summerhill

No.	Player	Position	Club
16	Seán Brennan	Substitute	Dunderry
17	Brian O’Halloran	Substitute	Ballivor
18	Eoin Harkin	Substitute	Dunsany
19	James McEntee	Substitute	Curraha
20	Cian McBride	Substitute	St Ultan's
21	Conor Gray	Substitute	Dunshaughlin
22	Aaron Lynch	Substitute	Trim
23	Daithí McGowan	Substitute	Ratoath
24	Shane Walsh	Substitute	Na Fianna
25	Diarmuid Moriarty	Substitute	Curraha
26	Cathal Hickey	Substitute	Seneschalstown

^{INJ} Player has had an injury which has affected recent involvement with the county team.
^{RET} Player has since retired from the county team.
^{WD} Player has since withdrawn from the county team due to a non-injury issue.

== Management team ==
Appointed September 2024:

- Manager: Robbie Brennan
- Backroom team: Martin Corey, Joe McMahon (until March 2025)

== Managerial history ==
Note: Fr. Packie Tully trained the teams that won the 1949, 1954 and 1967 All-Ireland Senior Football Championship titles.

The played/won/drawn/lost statistics since 1975 in the table below refer only to games in the All-Ireland SFC.

Name	First	Last	Origin	P	W	D	L	Win%	Provincial honours	National honours
Mick O'Brien	1975	1977		8	5	0	3	63%		
Des Ferguson	1978	1982		9	3	1	5	33%		
Seán Boylan	1983	2005	Dunboyne	95	61	11	23	64%	1983 O'Byrne Cup, 1986 Leinster SFC, 1987 Leinster SFC, 1988 Leinster SFC, 1990 Leinster SFC, 1991 Leinster SFC, 1992 O'Byrne Cup, 1996 Leinster SFC, 1999 Leinster SFC, 2001 O'Byrne Cup, 2001 Leinster SFC, 2004 O'Byrne Cup	1984 Centenary Cup, 1987 All-Ireland SFC, 1987–88 NFL, 1988 All-Ireland SFC, 1989–90 NFL, 1993–94 NFL, 1996 All-Ireland SFC, 1999 All-Ireland SFC
Eamonn Barry	2006	2006	Dunshaughlin	5	3	0	2	60%	2006 O'Byrne Cup	—N/a
Colm Coyle	2007	2008	Seneschalstown	11	6	1	4	55%	—N/a	—N/a
Eamonn O'Brien	2009	2010	Walterstown	13	9	1	3	69%	2010 Leinster SFC	—N/a
Séamus McEnaney	2011	2012		10	5	1	4	50%	—N/a	—N/a
Mick O'Dowd	2013	2016	Skryne	14	6	0	8	43%	2016 O'Byrne Cup	—N/a
Andy McEntee	2017	2022	Dunboyne	8	4	0	4	50%	2018 O'Byrne Cup	—N/a
Colm O'Rourke	2023	2024	Skryne						—N/a	2023 Tailteann Cup
Robbie Brennan	2025	—	Dunboyne							

== Players ==
=== Notable players ===
- Peter McDermott
- Colm O'Rourke
- Mick Lyons
- Graham Geraghty
- Trevor Giles
- Paddy O'Brien
- Martin O'Connell
- Robbie O'Malley
- Gerry McEntee
- Brian Stafford
- Ollie Murphy
- Tommy Dowd
- Jack Quinn
- John McDermott
- Nigel Nestor
- Paddy O'Brien
- Darren Fay
- Liam Harnan
- Pat "Red" Collier
- Bernard Flynn
- Pat Reynolds
- Bertie Cunningham
- Tommy "The Boiler" McGuinness

=== Records ===
- Brian Stafford is the team's top scorer in National Football League history, finishing his career with 13–334 (373) in that competition.

== Competitive record ==
This is Meath's record in All-Ireland SFC finals. Bold denotes a year in which the team won the competition.

Year	Date	Winner	Score	Loser	Score	Venue	Attendance	Winning margin	W/D/L
1895	15 March 1896	Tipperary	0–4	Meath	0–3	Jones' Road	8,000	1	L
1939	24 September	Kerry	2–5	Meath	2–3	Croke Park	46,828	2	L
**1949**	25 September	Meath	1–10	Cavan	1–6	Croke Park	79,460	4	W
1951	23 September	Mayo	2–8	Meath	1–9	Croke Park	78,201	5	L
1952	28 September	Cavan	2–4	Meath	1–7	Croke Park	64,200	0	D
1952	12 October	Cavan	0–9	Meath	0–5	Croke Park	62,515	4 (Replay)	L
**1954**	26 September	Meath	1–13	Kerry	1–7	Croke Park	75,276	6	W
1966	25 September	Galway	1–10	Meath	0–7	Croke Park	71,569	6	L
**1967**	24 September	Meath	1–9	Cork	0–9	Croke Park	70,343	3	W
1970	27 September	Kerry	2–19	Meath	0–18	Croke Park	71,775	7	L
**1987**	20 September	Meath	1–14	Cork	0–11	Croke Park	68,431	6	W
**1988**	18 September	Meath	0–12	Cork	1–9	Croke Park	65,000	0	D
**1988**	9 October	Meath	0–13	Cork	0–12	Croke Park	64,069	1 (Replay)	W
1990	16 September	Cork	0–11	Meath	0–9	Croke Park	65,723	2	L
1991	15 September	Down	1–16	Meath	1–14	Croke Park	64,500	2	L
**1996**	15 September	Meath	0–12	Mayo	1–9	Croke Park	65,898	0	D
**1996**	29 September	Meath	2–9	Mayo	1–11	Croke Park	65,802	1 (Replay)	W
**1999**	26 September	Meath	1–11	Cork	1–8	Croke Park	63,276	3	W
2001	23 September	Galway	0–17	Meath	0–8	Croke Park	70,482	9	L

== Honours ==
=== National ===
- All-Ireland Senior Football Championship
  - (gold) Winners (7): 1949, 1954, 1967, 1987, 1988, 1996, 1999
  - (silver) Runners-up (9): 1895, 1939, 1951, 1952, 1966, 1970, 1990, 1991, 2001
- Centenary Cup (once-off competition)
  - (gold) Winners (1): 1984
- Tailteann Cup
  - (gold) Winners (1): 2023
- National Football League
  - (gold) Winners (7): 1932–33, 1945–46, 1950–51, 1974–75, 1987–88, 1989–90, 1993–94
  - (silver) Runners-up (6): 1936–37, 1938–39, 1939–40, 1949–50, 1954–55, 1955–56, 1999–2000
- All-Ireland Junior Football Championship
  - (gold) Winners (5): 1947, 1952, 1962, 1988, 2003
- All-Ireland Under-21 Football Championship
  - (gold) Winners (1): 1993
  - (silver) Runners-up (1): 1997
- All-Ireland Minor Football Championship
  - (gold) Winners (4): 1957, 1990, 1992, 2021
  - (silver) Runners-up (4): 1977, 1993, 2002, 2012

=== Provincial ===
- Leinster Senior Football Championship
  - (gold) Winners (21): 1895, 1939, 1940, 1947, 1949, 1951, 1952, 1954, 1964, 1966, 1967, 1970, 1986, 1987, 1988, 1990, 1991, 1996, 1999, 2001, 2010
  - (silver) Runners-up (22): 1894, 1896, 1911, 1923, 1930, 1950, 1955, 1973, 1974, 1976, 1977, 1984, 1989, 1994, 1995, 1997, 1998, 2012, 2013, 2014, 2019, 2020, 2025
- O'Byrne Cup
  - (gold) Winners (10): 1967, 1974, 1977, 1983, 1992, 2001, 2004, 2006, 2016, 2018
- Leinster Junior Football Championship
  - (gold) Winners (18): 1947, 1952, 1958, 1962, 1964, 1986, 1988, 1990, 1991, 1995, 1996, 1997, 1999, 2003, 2005, 2006, 2017, 2019
- Leinster Under-21 Football Championship
  - (gold) Winners (9): 1985, 1989, 1990, 1991, 1993, 1996, 1997, 2001, 2024
  - (silver) Runners-up (5): 1971, 1987, 1994, 2000, 2014, 2025
- Leinster Minor Football Championship
  - (gold) Winners (13): 1957, 1972, 1977, 1980, 1985, 1990, 1992, 1993, 2006, 2008, 2018, 2020, 2021
  - (silver) Runners-up (15): 1946, 1954, 1955, 1956, 1970, 1975, 1979, 1981, 1983, 1986, 1988, 2002, 2011, 2012, 2026
