= 1996 All-Ireland Senior Football Championship final =

- Event: 1996 All-Ireland Senior Football Championship
Meath	Mayo
0–12 (12)	1–9 (12)
- Date: 15 September 1996
- Venue: Croke Park, Dublin
- Man of the Match: Liam McHale
- Referee: Pat McEnaney (Monaghan)
- Attendance: 65,898

1996 All-Ireland Senior Football Championship final replay
Meath	Mayo
2–9 (15)	1–11 (14)
- Date: 29 September 1996
- Venue: Croke Park, Dublin
- Man of the Match: Tommy Dowd
- Referee: Pat McEnaney (Monaghan)
- Attendance: 65,802

The 1996 All-Ireland Senior Football Championship final was the 109th All-Ireland Final and the deciding match of the 1996 All-Ireland Senior Football Championship, an inter-county Gaelic football tournament for the top teams in Ireland. It went to a replay and was eventually won by Meath, with Mayo losing. Neither team was expected to make the final as the competition got underway; Meath were expected to lose to Carlow in their first game of the Leinster Senior Football Championship. However, it would be for the most significant breach of on-field discipline in the sport's history that the 1996 All-Ireland final would be remembered.

== The brawl ==
The brawl broke out over by the Cusack Stand in the shadow of Hill 16. Almost 30 players, apart from Meath's Brendan Reilly, Mayo goalkeeper John Madden and his full-back Kevin Cahill, joined in the brawl.

Referee Pat McEnaney sought to punish those he deemed the worst offenders. He decided he would send off Mayo's Liam McHale and Meath's John McDermott. "When it all settled down my gut instinct was to send off McDermott with McHale. I had my mind made up on that", McEnaney later said.

Then he consulted with umpire Francie McMahon, who had witnessed something dreadful. "Pat," he said. "You're going to have to send off Colm Coyle. He's after dropping about six of them". One of the linesmen, Kevin Walsh, intervened to also highlight Coyle's indiscretions.

McEnaney sent off McHale and Coyle. McHale has never claimed not to have been involved in the brawl that day; indeed, he is on record as saying: "I was right in the middle right from the start". Coyle had arrived later.

== The games ==
This year's final was played on 15 September, with the replay following on 29 September.

Ray Dempsey's 45th-minute goal gave Mayo a lead of six points; however, a Meath comeback, culminating in a last-minute Colm Coyle long-range point, saw the game end in a draw on a scoreline of 1–9 to 0–12.

The final ended in a draw, Meath getting last-minute point when Colm Coyle pumped the ball in that was allowed to bounce and ended up over the bar. As is customary, a replay followed. Meath won by a point, with goals by Trevor Giles (penalty) and Tommy Dowd. Meath's Mark O'Reilly was just a boy that day.

Brendan Reilly scored the winning point.

It was the first of two All-Ireland football titles for Meath that decade, followed by success in 1999.

This was the second consecutive All-Ireland Senior Football Championship Final replay in which at least at least one player sent off; Gerry McEntee was sent off in the 1988 All-Ireland Senior Football Championship Final replay.

== Drawn game ==
=== Details ===
15 September 1996
15:30 IST (UTC+1)

Meath	0–12 – 1–9	Mayo
Trevor Giles 0–6, Brendan Reilly 0–3, Graham Geraghty 0–1, Colm Coyle 0–1, John McDermott 0–1		Maurice Sheridan 0–4, Ray Dempsey 1–0, James Horan 0–3, Colm McManamon 0–1, P. J. Loftus 0–1

Croke Park, Dublin
Attendance: 65,898
Referee: Pat McEnaney (Monaghan)

Meath	Mayo

1	Conor Martin
2	Mark O'Reilly
3	Darren Fay
4	Martin O'Connell
5	Colm Coyle
6	Enda McManus
7	Paddy Reynolds	Substituted off
8	Jimmy McGuinness	Substituted off
9	John McDermott
10	Trevor Giles
11	Tommy Dowd (c)
12	Graham Geraghty
13	Evan Kelly	Substituted off
14	Brendan Reilly
15	Barry Callaghan
Substitutes:
16	Ronan Finnegan
17	Jody Devine	Substituted on
18	Donal Curtis	Substituted on
19	Ollie Murphy
20	Kevin Cahill
21	Stephen O'Rourke
22	John Brady
23	Colm Brady	Substituted on
24	Cathal Sheridan
Manager:
Seán Boylan

1	John Madden
2	Kenneth Mortimer
3	Kevin Cahill
4	Dermot Flanagan
5	Pat Holmes
6	James Nallen
7	Noel Connelly (c)
8	Liam McHale
9	David Brady
10	James Horan	Substituted off
11	Colm McManamon
12	Maurice Sheridan
13	David Nestor	Substituted off
14	John Casey	Substituted off
15	Ray Dempsey
Substitutes:
16	Barry Heffernan
17	Peter Butler
18	Pat Fallon
19	Gary Ruane
20	Kevin O'Neill	Substituted on
21	Anthony Finnerty	Substituted on
22	P. J. Loftus	Substituted on
23	Michael Gardiner
24	Anthony McGarry
Manager:
John Maughan

== Replay ==
=== Details ===
29 September 1996
15:30 IST (UTC+1)

Meath	2–9 – 1–11	Mayo
Trevor Giles 1–4, Tommy Dowd 1–3, Barry Callaghan 0–1, Brendan Reilly 0–1		Maurice Sheridan 0–5, James Horan 0–5, P. J. Loftus 1–0, John Casey 0–1

Croke Park, Dublin
Attendance: 65,802
Referee: Pat McEnaney (Monaghan)

Meath	Mayo

1	Conor Martin
2	Mark O'Reilly	Substituted off
3	Darren Fay
4	Martin O'Connell
5	Colm Coyle	SO
6	Enda McManus
7	Paddy Reynolds
8	Jimmy McGuinness
9	John McDermott
10	Trevor Giles
11	Tommy Dowd (c)
12	Graham Geraghty
13	Colm Brady
14	Brendan Reilly
15	Barry Callaghan	Substituted off
Substitutes:
16	Ronan Finnegan
17	Jody Devine	Substituted on
18	Evan Kelly
19	Donal Curtis
20	Ollie Murphy	Substituted on
21	Kevin Cahill
22	Stephen O'Rourke
23	John Brady
24	Cathal Sheridan
Manager:
Seán Boylan

1	John Madden
2	Kenneth Mortimer
3	Kevin Cahill
4	Dermot Flanagan	Substituted off
5	Pat Holmes
6	James Nallen
7	Noel Connelly (c)
8	Liam McHale	SO
9	David Brady
10	James Horan
11	Colm McManamon
12	Maurice Sheridan
13	Anthony Finnerty	Substituted off
14	John Casey
15	Ray Dempsey	Substituted off
Substitutes:
16	Barry Heffernan
17	Peter Butler
18	Pat Fallon	Substituted on
19	Gary Ruane
20	David Nestor
21	Tom Reilly	Substituted on
22	P. J. Loftus	Substituted on
23	Michael Gardiner
24	Anthony McGarry
Manager:
John Maughan

== Post-match ==
Inaccurate stories spread afterwards that McEnaney had received hate mail at his home, but, McEnaney later said, the only letter he received (from a Meath supporter) praised McEnaney for how he had handled the brawl.

The teams did not meet again the championship until 2009.

McHale and McEnaney had not spoken, as of 2009.
