= 1997 All-Ireland Senior Football Championship final =

- Event: 1997 All-Ireland Senior Football Championship
Kerry	Mayo
0–13 (13)	1–7 (10)
- Date: 28 September 1997
- Venue: Croke Park, Dublin
- Referee: Brian White (Wexford)
- Attendance: 65,601

The 1997 All-Ireland Senior Football Championship final was the 110th All-Ireland Final and the deciding match of the 1997 All-Ireland Senior Football Championship, an inter-county Gaelic football tournament for the top teams in Ireland.

== Match ==
=== Summary ===
Kerry bridged an 11-year gap, the longest in their history, helped by nine Maurice Fitzgerald points. Fitzgerald also broke Billy O'Shea's leg on the pitch.

Mayo in their second final appearance in a row, were hoping to bridge a gap that stretched back to their All-Ireland SFC title winning team of 1951.

=== Details ===
Kerry
Mayo

==== Kerry ====
- 1 D. O'Keeffe
- 2 K. Burns
- 3 Barry O'Shea
- 4 S. Stack
- 5 S. Moynihan
- 6 L. O'Flaherty
- 7 E. Breen
- 8 D. Ó Sé
- 9 W. Kirby
- 10 P. Laide
- 11 L. Hassett (c)
- 12 D. O'Dwyer
- 13 Billy O'Shea
- 14 D. Ó Cinnéide
- 15 M. Fitzgerald

Sub used
22 J. Crowley for Billy O'Shea
19 M. F. Russell for D. Ó Cinnéide
20 D. Daly for W. Kirby

Sub not used
16 P. O'Leary
17 M. Hassett
18 B. Clarke
21 S. Burke
23 M. O'Shea
24 T. Ó Sé

Manager
P. Ó Sé

==== Mayo ====
- 1 P. Burke
- 2 K. Mortimer
- 3 P. Holmes
- 4 D. Flanagan
- 5 F. Costello
- 6 J. Nallen
- 7 N. Connelly
- 8 P. Fallon
- 9 D. Heaney
- 10 M. Sheridan
- 11 C. McManamon
- 12 J. Casey
- 13 C. McDonald
- 14 L. McHale
- 15 D. Nestor

Subs used
J. Horan for Flanagan
D. Byrne for Sheridan
PJ Loftus for Nestor

Manager
J. Maughan
