= David Brady (Gaelic footballer) =

Mayo Gaelic footballer

Personal information
- Native name: Dáithí Ó Brádaigh (Irish)
- Born: 1974 (age 51–52) Ireland
- Occupations: Journalist, medical rep, tour operator

Sport
- Sport: Gaelic football
- Position: Midfielder
Club
- Years: Club
- Ballina Stephenites
Club titles
- Mayo titles: 4
- Connacht titles: 3
- All-Ireland Titles: 1
Inter-county
- Years: County
- 1996–2008: Mayo
Inter-county titles
- Connacht titles: 5
- All-Irelands: 0
- NFL: 1

David Brady (born 1974) is an Irish former Gaelic footballer who played for the Mayo county team in midfield in the 1990s and 2000s. As of 2020, he works as a journalist.

== Early life ==
Brady grew up in Ballina, County Mayo; his mother was from Mayo and his father from Castleconor, County Sligo. He has twin younger brothers, Ger Brady and Liam Brady.

== Playing career ==
Brady played in midfield for Ballina Stephenites and Mayo.

In 1994 and 1995 he was on the under-21 teams that lost the All-Ireland Under-21 Football Championship final.

Brady was on the Mayo team that lost the 1996 All-Ireland Senior Football Championship Final; he missed the 1997 final due to a broken leg. Mayo won the 2000–01 National Football League and Brady was also on the team that lost the 2004 All-Ireland Senior Football Championship Final.

In 2005 his club Ballina Stephenites won the All-Ireland Senior Club Football Championship, Brady finally winning an All-Ireland final after losing his first seven.

In 2003 Brady retired from the inter-county team, but returned; he retired again in 2005, but returned to play on the Mayo team that lost the 2006 All-Ireland Senior Football Championship Final.

He finally retired in 2008, in part due to back pain.

In 2012 Brady managed the Ballina Stephenites senior team.

== Media career ==
Since retiring, Brady has worked as a sports journalist and pundit, appearing on TV3 and Newstalk. He also writes for the Intersport Elverys Blog. Brady is also active on Twitter. He was the subject of a 2020 Laochra Gael episode.

== Personal life ==
Brady works as a medical sales rep. His wife is from Dublin; they have two children.
