= Evan Kelly =

Gaelic footballer

Personal information
- Native name: Éimhín Ó Ceallaigh (Irish)

Sport
- Sport: Gaelic Football
- Position: Forward
Clubs
- Years: Club
- Drumree & Simonstown
Inter-county
Years	County	Apps (scores)
1994–2004	Meath	(4–43)
Inter-county titles
- Leinster titles: 3
- All-Irelands: 2
- All Stars: 1

Evan Kelly is a former Gaelic footballer who played with the Meath county team between 1994 and 2004. At club level, he played first for Drumree, before moving to Simonstown later in his career.

Kelly was part of the Meath teams that won the All-Ireland Senior Football Championship in 1996 and 1999.

He made his inter-county debut in the 1994–95 National League against Derry.

His championship debut came the following year when he scored 0–5 against Offaly in the preliminary round of the Leinster Championship. His first championship goals came in the next game against Longford where he scored two second-half goals.

He was selected as part of the 2001 All-Star team.

== Honours ==
- All-Ireland Senior Football Championship (2): 1996, 1999
- Leinster Senior Football Championship (3): 1996, 1999, 2001
- O'Byrne Cup (1): 2001
- All Star (1): 2001
