= Maurice Sheridan =

Irish Gaelic footballer

Personal information
- Native name: Muiris Ó Sirideáin (Irish)
- Born: 1974 (age 51–52) Balla, County Mayo, Ireland
- Occupation: Secondary school teacher
- Height: 6 ft 3 in (191 cm)

Sport
- Sport: Gaelic football
- Position: Left Half Forward
Clubs
- Years: Club
- 1991–2000 2001–2009: Balla; Salthill–Knocknacarra
Club titles
- Galway titles: 1
- Connacht titles: 1
- All-Ireland Titles: 1
College
- Years: College
- 1992: UCG
College titles
- Sigerson titles: 1
Inter-county*
| Years | County | Apps (scores) |
| 1995–2003 | Mayo | 23 (1-105) |
Inter-county titles
- Connacht titles: 3
- NFL: 1
- *Inter County team apps and scores correct as of 16:54, 27 November 2016.

Maurice Sheridan (born 1974) is an Irish former Gaelic footballer. His league and championship career at senior level with the Mayo county team lasted nine seasons from 1995 until 2003.

== Playing career ==
Sheridan made his debut on the inter-county scene when he was picked for the Mayo under-21 team. He won back-to-back Connacht medals in this grade, however, an All-Ireland medal remained elusive. Sheridan made his senior debut during the 1995 championship. He was a regular on the starting fifteen over much of the next decade and won three Connacht medals and one National Football League medal. He was an All-Ireland runner-up on two occasions.

== Managerial career ==
Sheridan oversaw NUI Galway to the final of the 2018 Sigerson Cup. In January 2021, Sheridan was appointed manager of the Mayo under-20 county team.

== Personal life ==
Sheridan teaches at Coláiste Bhaile Chláir in Claregalway. His mother is originally from Salthill, and he lived nearby, which led to Sheridan eventually joining that club from Balla.

== Career statistics ==
| Team | Season | Connacht | | All-Ireland | | Total | |
| Team | Season | Apps | Score | Apps | Score | Apps | Score |
|---|---|---|---|---|---|---|---|
| Mayo | 1995 | 1 | 0-00 | 0 | 0-00 | 1 | 0-00 |
| Mayo | 1996 | 3 | 1-18 | 3 | 0-15 | 6 | 1-33 |
| Mayo | 1997 | 3 | 0-21 | 2 | 0-07 | 5 | 0-28 |
| Mayo | 1998 | 1 | 0-03 | 0 | 0-00 | 1 | 0-03 |
| Mayo | 1999 | 3 | 0-18 | 1 | 0-03 | 4 | 0-21 |
| Mayo | 2000 | 0 | 0-00 | 0 | 0-00 | 0 | 0-00 |
| Mayo | 2001 | 2 | 0-09 | 1 | 0-04 | 3 | 0-13 |
| Mayo | 2001 | 0 | 0-00 | 0 | 0-00 | 0 | 0-00 |
| Mayo | 2003 | 2 | 0-02 | 1 | 0-05 | 3 | 0-07 |
| Total | | 15 | 1-71 | 8 | 0-34 | 23 | 1-105 |

== Honours ==
Salthill–Knocknacarra

- All-Ireland Senior Club Football Championship (1): 2006
- Connacht Senior Club Football Championship (1): 2005
- Galway Senior Football Championship (1): 2005

Mayo

- Connacht Senior Football Championship (1): 1996, 1997, 1999
- National Football League (1): 2000-01
