= Cork–Limerick Gaelic football rivalry =

Cork-Limerick
- Location: County Cork; County Limerick
- Teams: Cork; Limerick
- First meeting: Cork 3-5 - 0-0 Limerick; 1894 Munster semi-final (17 July 1894)
- Latest meeting: Cork 4-16 - 1-16 Limerick; 2025 Munster quarter-final (12 April 2025)

Statistics
- Total meetings: 33
- Most wins: Cork (32)
- All-time series: Cork 32-3 Limerick

The Cork-Limerick rivalry is a Gaelic football rivalry between Irish county teams Cork and Limerick, who first played each other in 1894. It is a rivalry that has been dominated by Cork. Cork's home ground is Páirc Uí Chaoimh and Limerick's home ground is the Gaelic Grounds.

While Cork have 37 Munster titles and Limerick have just one provincial triumph, they have also enjoyed success in the All-Ireland Senior Football Championship, having won 9 championship titles between them to date.

== All-time results ==
=== Legend ===
Cork win
Limerick win
Drawn game

=== Senior ===
No.	Date	Winners	Score	Runners-up	Venue	Stage
1.	17 July 1894	Cork	3-5 - 0-0	Limerick	Cork Park	Munster Semi-Final
2.	14 March 1897	Limerick	1-2 - 1-1	Cork	Tipperary	Munster Quarter-Final
3.	25 September 1898	Cork	1-2 - 1-1	Limerick	Tipperary	Munster Final
4.	19 April 1903	Cork	1-9 - 1-9	Limerick	Tipperary	Munster Final
5.	8 December 1907	Cork	2-5 - 0-2	Limerick	Limerick	Munster Quarter-Final
6.	2 August 1908	Cork	0-16 - 0-3	Limerick	Ennis	Munster Quarter-Final
7.	24 August 1913	Cork	3-3 - 0-3	Limerick	Tipperary	Munster Semi-Final
8.	8 July 1917	Cork	1-1 - 0-0	Limerick	Markets Field	Munster Semi-Final
9.	19 July 1925	Cork	1-3 - 1-1	Limerick	Buttevant	Munster Quarter-Final
10.	26 May 1935	Cork	2-3 - 0-4	Limerick	Charleville	Munster Semi-Final
11.	29 May 1938	Cork	2-7 - 2-3	Limerick	Seán Treacy Park	Munster Semi-Final
12.	3 June 1951	Cork	2-13 - 2-4	Limerick	Buttevant	Munster Quarter-Final
13.	20 June 1965	Limerick	2-5 - 0-6	Cork	Fitzgerald Stadium	Munster Semi-Final
14.	26 June 1966	Cork	5-10 - 1-0	Limerick	Fitzgerald Stadium	Munster Semi-Final
15.	8 June 1980	Cork	5-19 - 1-6	Limerick	Páirc Uí Chaoimh	Munster Semi-Final
16.	21 June 1987	Cork	1-14 - 0-11	Limerick	Páirc Uí Chaoimh	Munster Semi-Final
17.	29 May 1988	Cork	0-9 - 1-3	Limerick	Páirc na nGael	Munster Semi-Final
18.	27 May 1990	Cork	4-15 - 1-3	Limerick	Páirc Uí Chaoimh	Munster Semi-Final
19.	12 May 1996	Cork	2-19 - 1-6	Limerick	FitzGerald Park	Munster Quarter-Final
20.	20 June 1999	Cork	4-13 - 1-6	Limerick	Páirc Uí Rinn	Munster Semi-Final
21.	20 May 2000	Cork	3-13 - 2-8	Limerick	FitzGerald Park	Munster Quarter-Final
22.	11 May 2003	Limerick	0-16 - 0-6	Cork	Páirc Uí Chaoimh	Munster Quarter-Final
23.	11 June 2006	Cork	0-9 - 0-5	Limerick	Gaelic Grounds	Munster Semi-Final
24.	20 May 2007	Cork	2-14 - 1-7	Limerick	Páirc Uí Chaoimh	Munster Quarter-Final
25.	15 June 2008	Cork	2-6 - 0-11	Limerick	Gaelic Grounds	Munster Semi-Final
26.	5 July 2009	Cork	2-6 - 0-11	Limerick	Páirc Uí Chaoimh	Munster Final
27.	24 July 2010	Cork	1-11 - 0-16	Limerick	Gaelic Grounds	All Ireland Qualifier Round 4
28.	25 May 2013	Cork	3-17 - 0-08	Limerick	Gaelic Grounds	Munster Quarter-Final
29.	9 July 2016	Cork	2-12 - 0-10	Limerick	Semple Stadium	All Ireland Qualifier Round 3
30.	8 June 2019	Cork	3-18 - 0-6	Limerick	Páirc Uí Rinn	Munster Semi-Final
31.	10 July 2021	Cork	1-16 - 0-11	Limerick	Gaelic Grounds	Munster Semi-Final
32.	6 April 2024	Cork	3-13 - 0-11	Limerick	Páirc Uí Chaoimh	Munster Quarter-Final
33.	5 April 2025	Cork	0-24 - 0-13	Limerick	Gaelic Grounds	Munster Quarter-Final
34.	12 April 2026	Cork	4-16 - 1-16	Limerick	Páirc Uí Chaoimh	Munster Quarter-Final
