= Denis O'Dwyer =

Denis Dwyer
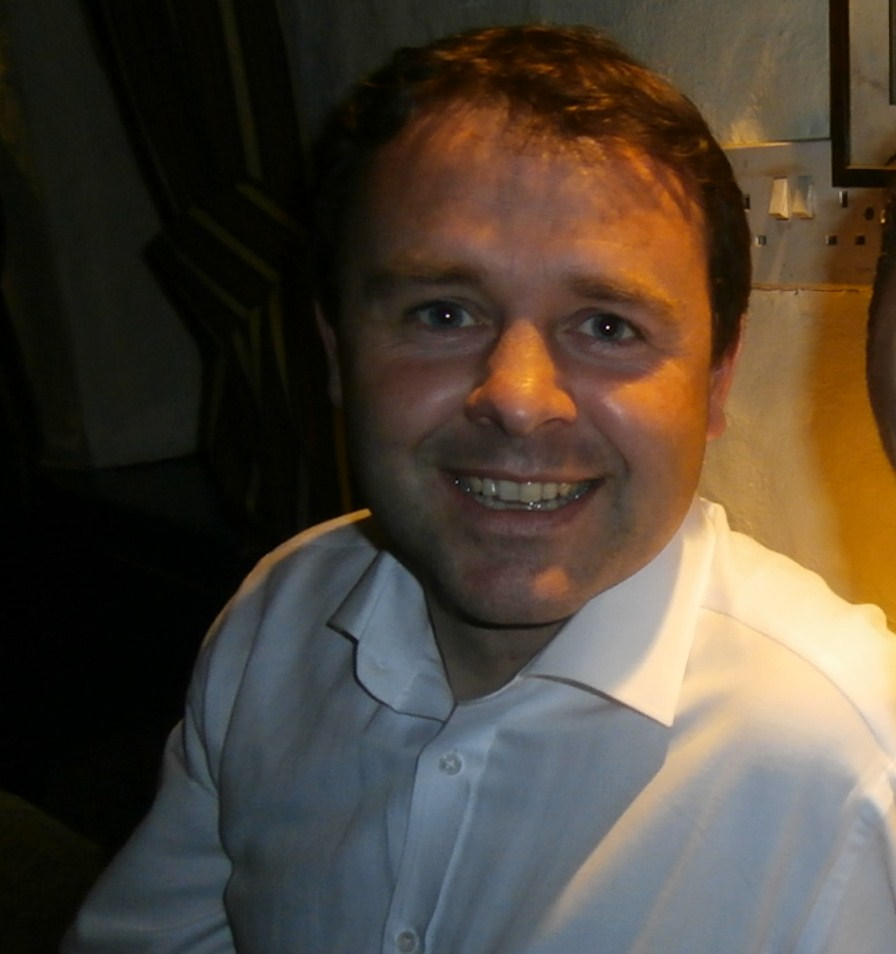

Personal information
- Born: Waterville, County Kerry
- Occupation: EBS Financial Adviser

Sport
- Sport: Gaelic football
- Position: Half Forward
Club
- Years: Club
- 1990's-2000's: Waterville
Inter-county
| Years | County | Apps (scores) |
| 1996-2005 | Kerry | 18(1-04) |
Inter-county titles
- Munster titles: 4
- All-Irelands: 2(1 sub)
- NFL: 1
- All Stars: 0

Denis Dwyer is a footballer from Waterville, County Kerry, Ireland. He played Wing Forward on the Kerry team that won the All-Ireland Senior Football Championship 1997 & was a sub on the 2000 team. He has also won All Irelands at Minor in 1994 U21 in 1995 as Captain & 1996 and Vocational Schools in 1993. He also won a Munster Junior Championship in 1995. In 2004 he was a member of the South Kerry side that won the Kerry Senior Football Championship.

== Schools, Underage and Junior ==
Dwyer first tasted All Ireland success as a member of the Kerry Vocational Schools team with whom he won an All Ireland with in 1993.

Following on from his Vocational Schools success he was a member of the Kerry minor team in 1993 but had little success as Kerry lost out to Cork in the Munster semi final on a 2-07 to 1-09 scoreline, with Dwyer scoring a point. He was still underage in 1994 and played a key role as Kerry win a first Munster title since 1990, when they overcame Clare in the final. This set up an All Ireland semi final clash with Ulster champs Armagh in Croke Park and game that Kerry won to qualify for the All Ireland final for, once more, the first time since 1990. In the final they faced off with Galway, at the full-time whistle, after a playing a key role at midfield, Dwyer and Kerry found themselves on the rightside of a 0-16 to 1-07 scoreline and a first title for Kerry since 1988.

1995 seen Dwyer move straight into the Kerry Under 21 side as captain. He played his first game at the grade in the Munster first-round game with Clare at Left Half Forward, where he would play for the rest of the season. Kerry won the game with plenty to spare on a 1-13 to 0-07 scoreline. In the semi-final Kerry had a big win over Limerick, a game where Dwyer would score 3 points, on a 4-17 to 2-05 scoreline. This set up a quite novel pairing in the Munster final as Kerry faced Waterford. Another big win was the result, with Dwyer chipping in with 2 points this time, on a 1-21 to 2-05 scoreline. Picking up the trophy as the team's captain. He would miss out on the All Ireland semi final win over Donegal but was back at Left Half Forward for the final. In the final Kerry would face Mayo. In the final 1-02 from Dwyer helped Kerry to a 2-12 to 3-09 draw. In the replay Kerry made no mistake, and with 2 points from Dwyer, they ran out winners on a 3-10 to 1-12 scoreline and win a first title at the grade since 1990. Dwyer played in 5 of Kerrys 6 games and scored 1-09 in total.

1995 also seen Dwyer play with the county junior team. He picked up a Munster championship medal after an extra time win over Cork in the final. Kerry went on to lose the All Ireland semi final.

Kerry stated the defense of their Munster title with a repeat of the 95 final where they overcame Waterford on a 2-16 to 1-05 scoreline, with Dwyer at midfield. That result set up a Munster semi final with Cork. A point from Dwyer helped his side to a comfortable 2-14 to 0-08 win and another Munster final for Dwyer. It was another novel pairing as Kerry faced off with Clare in the final. Dwyer was back at Left Half Forward for the game as Kerry once more ran out comfortable winners on a 3-14 to 0-06 scoreline, giving Dwyer a second Munster title at Under 21 level. The semi final was a repeat of the 1994 All Ireland minor final, a game Dwyer had played a key role in Kerry winning. A point from Dwyer meant Kerry won with 7 points to spare on a 3-09 to 0-12 scoreline. This set up Kerry for their 5 All Ireland final 7 years. They would face Ulster champions Cavan this time around. In what was to be the closest game of the season for Kerry, a point from Dwyer went a long way in helping his side to a 1-17 to 2-10 win, giving Dwyer and Kerry a second title in a row. In his second year of playing Under 21 Dwyer played in all 5 of Kerrys games and scored 3 points.

In 1997 Dwyer was still underage for the under 21 grade. But was one of the senior members of the side. Kerry started off their Munster campaign with a big win over Limerickk on a 4-16 to 0-05 scoreline, with 1-01 from midfield from Dwyer. The semi final was another comfortable win with Clare accounted for on a 1-17 to 0-07 scoreline. This set up a Munster final with Cork. Despite playing for 3 years at Under 21 this was Dwyers first time to play Cork in a Munster final. In an exciting game the two sides finished level on a 22-11 to 3-08 scoreline. The replay was to be another close game with Kerry just shading it on a 0-12 to 1-07 scoreline, giving Dwyer this third Munster championship medal. In the All Ireland semi final with Meath Kerry and Dwyers dream of 3 All Irelands in a row came to an end when they lost out on a 0-14 to 0-13 scoreline, with Dwyer scoring a point from midfield.

Dwyer had a successful Under 21 career with Kerry. He played in 15 games and scored 2-14, Winning 3 Munster titles and 2 All Irelands

== Senior career ==
On the back of his displays at underage level Dwyer played his first game at senior level with Kerry during an NFL game with Laois in 1996, he would play 3 games in total in the league that year. He would make his championship debut later that summer in the Munster semi final win over Waterford when he appeared off the bunch. He played no part in the Munster final win over Cork however. He would again come on as a sub during Kerrys 2-12 to 1-10 loss to Mayo in the All Ireland semi final. In his first season at senior level he would play 3 league and 2 championship games.

1997 would see Dwyer becoming a regular member of the Kerry starting 15. He would play in 9 of Kerrys 10 games during the NFL that year, including in the final where he scored a goal as Kerry beat Cork to take the title on a 3=07 to 1-08 scoreline. He made his first start at championship level that summer, lining out at Right Half Forward and scoring a goal, as Kerry overcame Tipperary in the semi-final of the Munster championship. A shock in the other semi final that seen Clare overcame Cork, set up a novel Munster final pairing for Kerry. There was to be no surprise in the final however as Kerry ran out winners on a comfortable 1-13 to 0-11 scoreline. A point from Dwyer marked his first Munster final victory. Kerry were back in Croke Park for the semi-final where they took on surprise Ulster champions Cavan, a side who Dwyer had faced the previous year at Under 21 level. A point from Dwyer helped his side to another conmfturbale win on a 1-17 to 1-10 scoreline. This seen Kerry qualify for a first All Ireland senior final since 1986, and a repeat of the 96 semi final, where they would face Mayo. Despite not scoring during the game Dwyer played a key role in a 0-13 to 1-07 victory that seen Kerry win their first in 11 years. It was the 5th All Ireland title in a row for Dwyer, Vocational Schools (93), Minor (94) and Under 21 (95 &96). In what was his first full year at senior level Dwyer played in all but one of Kerrys games in both league and championship, scoring 1-02 in 4 championship games, and picking up National League, Munster and All Ireland titles.

1998 seen O Dwyer miss part of the league but he still managed to play in 5 of Kerrys games. He played in the first round where Kerry took in Cavan in New York City to mark the 50th. He was back in time for the championship and played in the half forward line as Kerry over came Cork in the Munster semi final on a 1-14 to 1-11 scoreline. This set up a Munster final with Tipperary. In what was to be a close game Kerry ran out winners by 4 points, 0-17 to 1-10, giving O Dwyer his second Munster title. This set up a meeting with surprise Leinster champions Kildare, a team managed by ex Kerry player and manager Mick O'Dwyer. Kerry were expected to win and make a second All Ireland final in a row however things didn't work out to plan and Kildare ran out surprise winners on a 0-13 to 1-09 scoreline. O Dwyer lost out on his starting place and only appeared as a sub.

Injury would see O Dwyer only appear in one game for Kerry, the first round of the NFL where Kerry lost to Roscommon.

He was back in 2000, playing in all but one of Kerrys NFL games. He made his championship return when he came on as a sub during the 2-15 to 1-13 Munster semi final win over Cork. This set up a repeat for the 1997 final where Kerry faced Clare. Again coming off the bunch he helped his side to a 3-15 to 0-08 rout and win a third Munster championship medal. In the semi-final Kerry faced Ulster champions Armagh, O Dwyer once again coming on as a sub in an exciting game that would end in a draw 2-11 each. For the reply he was back in the starting 15 for the first time since the 98 Munster final. In another exciting game Kerry won after extra time on a 2-15 to 1-15 scoreline. This seen Kerry back in the final for the first time since 97, where they took on Galway. O Dwyer found himself back on the bunch, but came on during the 0-14 each draw. He played no part in the replay that Kerry won.

In 2001 he would play 5 of Kerrys NFL games in what was to be his last season with Kerry. He started Left Half Forward, in what was to be his last start at championship level, in the first round of the Munster championship and scored 2 points as Kerry overcame Tipperary on a huge 3-17 to 1-04 scoreline. Despite a good showing he was back on the bunch for the semi-final win over Limerick. He again came off the bunch in his last Munster final appearance as Kerry won their 5th title in 6 years overcoming Cork by 0-19 to 1-13, giving him a 4th Munster medal. In the first year of the back door Kerry faced old fous Dublin in the Q/F. He once more, and for the final time, appeared off the bunch during an exciting 1-14 each draw. He would play no part in the replay win for semi final loss to Meath.

At the age of 25 his intercounty days were over, bar a McGrath Cup appearance in 2005. During his short senior career he picked up 4 MUnster championship medals, 2 All Irelands (one as a sub) and a National League medal. He made 8 full Championship appearances and 10 appearances as a substitute. Scoring 1-04
