= Colm McManamon =

Irish Gaelic footballer

Colm McManamon (Cólm Mac Meanman) is a former Gaelic footballer from Tiernaur, Mulranny, County Mayo, Ireland who played for Burrishoole and the Mayo county team. He represented Ireland twice in International Rules.

He is related to Dublin footballer Kevin McManamon.

== See also ==
- 1996 All-Ireland Senior Football Championship Final
- Geelong Football Club
- Irish experiment
