= Billy O'Shea =

Irish Gaelic footballer

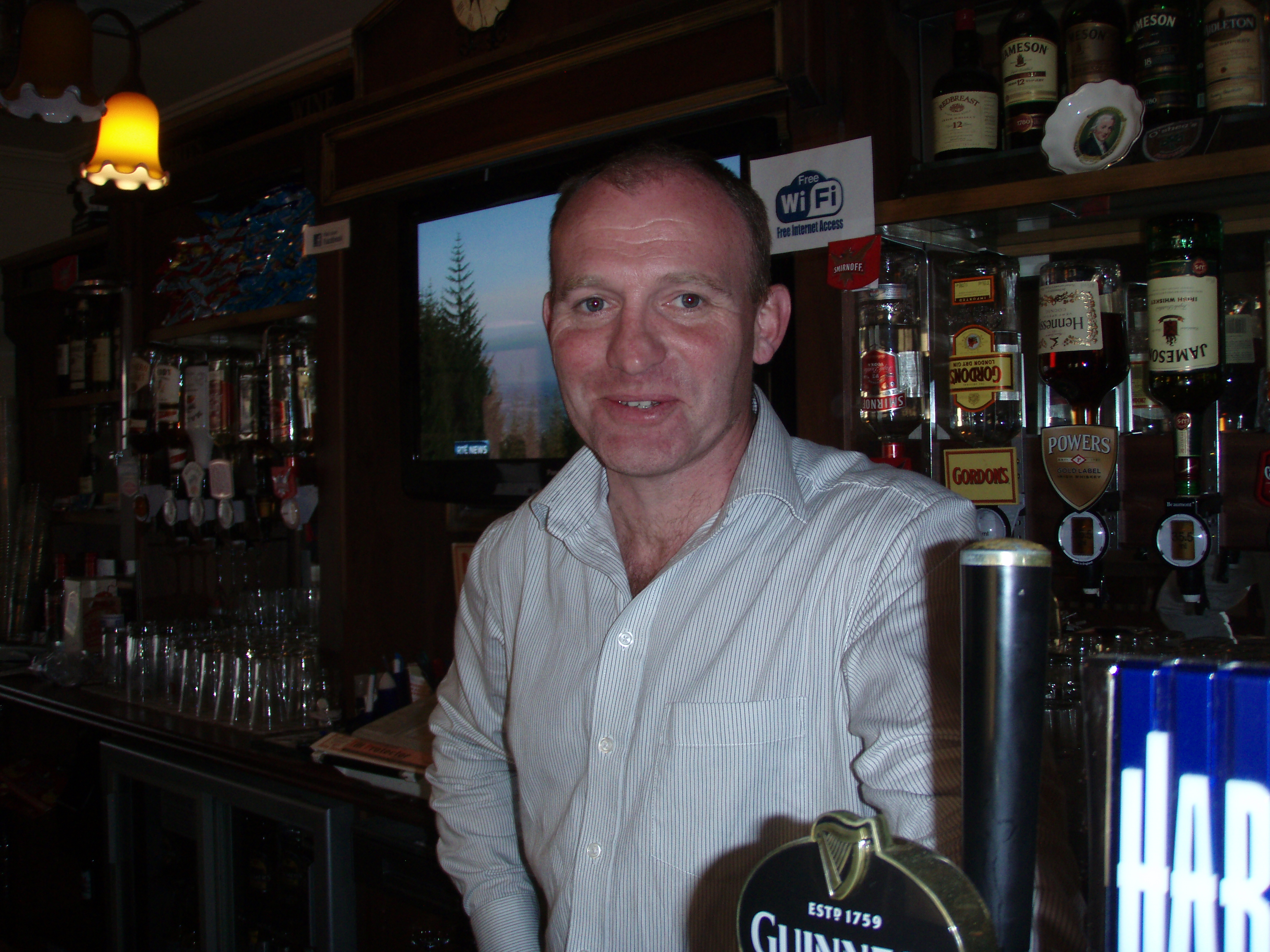

Personal information
- Born: Killorglin, County Kerry, Ireland
- Occupation: Auctioneer

Sport
- Sport: Football
- Position: Forward
Club
- Years: Club
- 1993-present: Laune Rangers
Club titles
- Kerry titles: 4
- Munster titles: 2
- All-Ireland Titles: 1
Inter-county
Years	County	Apps (scores)
1992-1999	Kerry	19 (2-11)
Inter-county titles
- Munster titles: 2
- All-Irelands: 1
- NFL: 0
- All Stars: 0

Billy O'Shea is a former Gaelic footballer from Killorglin, County Kerry. He played with the Kerry intercounty team at all levels during the 1990s and with his club Laune Rangers. He was a Fine Gael candidate in the Kerry constituency at the 2024 general election.

At inter-county level, O'Shea won Munster Championships at all levels, Minor in 1990, Under 21 in 1991 & 1992 and Senior in 1996 as captain and 1997. He also played in All Ireland final at all levels, losing Minor in 1990 and Under 21 in 1991. O'Shea won a Senior All Ireland medal in 1997 but was taken off early in the game after breaking his leg after a mix up with teammate Maurice Fitzgerald.

Billy O'Shea had great success at club level with Laune Rangers. During much of his playing days, they were one of the top teams in Ireland. O'Shea won Kerry Senior Football Championship titles in 1989, 1993, 1995 and 1996, he also played in finals 2003 and 2004. O'Shea missed out on the 1997 loss. He also won two Munster Senior Club Football Championship titles in 1995 and 1996 and an All-Ireland Senior Club Football Championship in 1996. O'Shea also won Minor 1988-89 and Under 21 1990 county championships. He won an impressive seven Kerry County Football League – Division 1 titles in 1989, 1992 and from 1994 to 1998.
