= Armagh-Down Gaelic football rivalry =

Sporting rivalry in Ulster

Armagh-Down
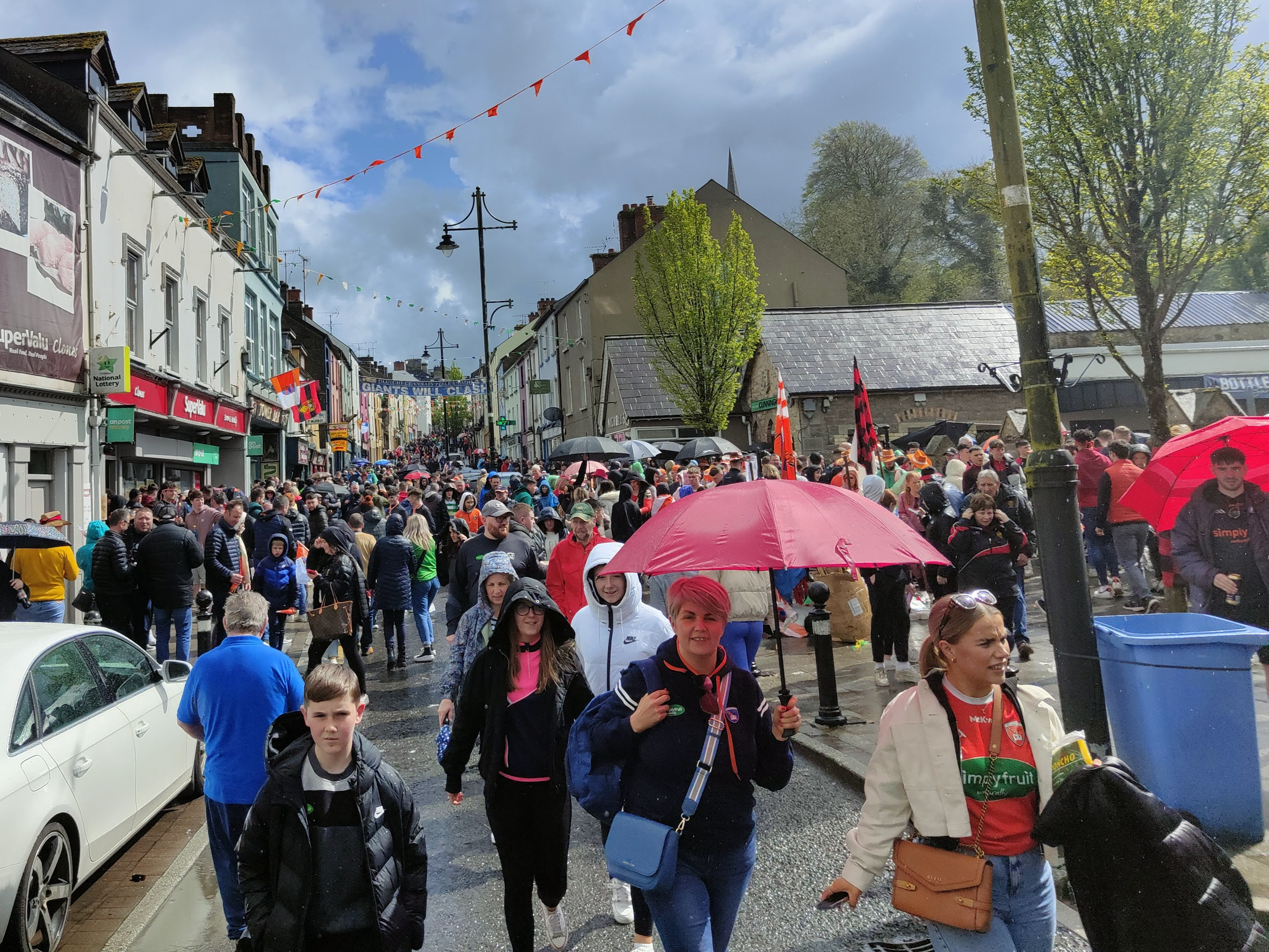
- Crowds attending the 2023 Ulster Semi-final between the counties
- Location: County Armagh; County Down
- Teams: Armagh; Down
- First meeting: Down 1-6 - 0-4 Armagh; 1906 Ulster Quarter Final (6 May 1906)
- Latest meeting: Armagh 0-13 - 2-6 Down; 2024 Ulster Semi-final (27 April 2024)
- Stadiums: Athletic Grounds (Armagh); Páirc Esler (Down)

The Armagh-Down Gaelic football rivalry concerns the Ulster teams of Armagh and Down. The two counties are neighbours and, between them, they have won 26 Ulster Senior Football Championships and 7 All-Ireland Senior Football Championships.

== Background ==
Armagh and Down first met in the Ulster Senior Football Championship in the 1904 competition. Games between the teams have sometimes been described as a "derby".

== Ulster finals ==
The first Ulster Senior Football Championship final between Armagh and Down in 1961, with subsequent finals in 1981 and 1999.

=== 1961 ===
23 July 1961
Final

Down	2–10 – 1–10	Armagh

Casement Park, Belfast
Attendance: 38,500

=== 1981 ===
19 July 1981
Final

Down	3–12 – 1–10	Armagh
A Rodgers 0–4, G Blaney 1–0, N King 0–1, B McCartan 0–1.		P Loughran 0–5, B Hughes 1–1, C McKinstrey 0–2, P Moriarty 0–1, P Rafferty 0–1.

St Tiernach's Park, Clones
Attendance: 25,000
Referee: J Heaney (Tyrone)

=== 1999 ===
1 August 1999
Final

Armagh	3–12 – 0-10	Down
O. McConville 2-7, D. Marsden 1-2, P. McGrane, J. McEntee, T McEntee	Report	S. Mulholland 0-4, C. McCabe 0-2 B. Burns, R. Carr, S. Ward, G. McCartan

St Tiernach's Park, Clones
Attendance: 36,354
Referee: P Russell (Tipperary)

== National League Finals ==
In the National Football League, 1983 National League Final and the 2010 National League Division 2 Final.

=== 1983 - Division One ===
24 April 1983
Final

Down	1-8 - 0-8	Armagh

Croke Park, Dublin
Attendance: 24,500
Referee: W Fogarty (Kerry)

=== 2010 - Division Two ===
25 April 2010
Final

Armagh	0-17 - 1-12	Down

Croke Park, Dublin
Referee: Ó Conamha (Galway)

== Miscellaneous ==
- The sides have met a number of times in the All-Ireland Qualifiers, notably being the first two teams drawn out for the first qualifier series in 2001.
- Down's home ground, Páirc Esler, is located in County Armagh.
- James McCartan Jnr, an All-Ireland winner with Down in 1991 and 1994, attempted to switch his allegiance to Armagh in 2001.
- Paddy O'Rourke, who captained Down to the All-Ireland title in 1991, managed both Down (2002–06) and Armagh (2009–12).

== All-time results ==
=== Legend ===
Down win
Armagh win
Match was a draw

=== Senior ===
No.	Date	Winners	Score	Runners-up	Venue	Stage
1.	6 May 1906	Down	2-11 - 0-4	Armagh	Newry	Ulster quarter-final
2.	1912	Armagh	w/o-scr.	Down		Ulster quarter-final
3.	24 May 1914	Armagh	2-5 - 0-0	Down	Newry	Ulster quarter-final
4.	11 July 1915	Armagh	1-7 - 1-1	Down	Newry	Ulster quarter-final
5.	5 May 1918	Armagh	0-5 - 0-4	Down	Camlough	Ulster quarter-final
6.	19 May 1929	Armagh	5-4 - 3-2	Down	Newry	Ulster quarter-final
7.	24 May 1931	Armagh	0-6 - 0-2	Down	Newry	Ulster quarter-final
8.	18 June 1933	Armagh	2-1 - 1-3	Down	Warrenpoint	Ulster quarter-final
9.	9 June 1935	Armagh	2-5 - 0-5	Down	Athletic Grounds	Ulster quarter-final
10.	13 June 1937	Armagh	4-14 - 2-7	Down	Athletic Grounds	Ulster quarter-final
11.	5 July 1942	Down	0-7 - 0-6	Armagh	St. Patrick's Park	Ulster semi-final
12.	12 July 1942	Down	1-12 - 2-5	Armagh	St. Patrick's Park	Ulster semi-final replay
13.	23 June 1946	Armagh	0-13 - 0-4	Down	St. Patrick's Park	Ulster quarter-final
14.	13 June 1948	Down	5-7 - 2-3	Armagh	St. Patrick's Park	Ulster preliminary round
15.	9 July 1950	Armagh	1-8 - 1-7	Down	O'Neill Park	Ulster semi-final
16.	12 June 1955	Armagh	1-8 - 0-5	Down	The Playing Fields	Ulster quarter-final
17.	24 June 1956	Armagh	2-5 - 0-6	Down	Páirc Esler	Ulster quarter-final
18.	23 July 1961	Down	2-10 - 1-10	Armagh	Casement Park	Ulster final
19.	10 June 1973	Down	2-10 - 2-9	Armagh	Páirc Esler	Ulster preliminary round
20.	9 June 1974	Down	1-10 - 0-6	Armagh	Páirc Esler	Ulster preliminary round
21.	19 July 1981	Down	3-12 - 1-10	Armagh	St Tiernach's Park	Ulster final
22.	29 June 1986	Down	3-7 - 0-12	Armagh	St. Mary's Park	Ulster semi-final
23.	1 July 1990	Armagh	2-7 - 0-12	Down	Casement Park	Ulster semi-final
24.	9 June 1991	Down	1-7 - 0-8	Armagh	Páirc Esler	Ulster quarter-final
25.	7 June 1992	Down	1-12 - 0-9	Armagh	Athletic Grounds	Ulster quarter-final
26.	14 June 1998	Armagh	0-16 - 0-11	Down	St Tiernach's Park	Ulster quarter-final
27.	1 August 1999	Armagh	3-12 - 0-10	Down	St Tiernach's Park	Ulster final
28.	9 June 2001	Armagh	1-13 - 2-4	Down	Casement Park	All-Ireland qualifier round 1
29.	29 June 2008	Armagh	1-12 - 0-11	Down	St Tiernach's Park	Ulster semi-final
30.	28 May 2011	Armagh	1-15 - 1-10	Down	Athletic Grounds	Ulster quarter-final
31.	4 June 2017	Down	0-15 - 2-7	Armagh	Pairc Esler	Ulster quarter-final
32.	19 May 2019	Armagh	2-17 - 3-13	Down	Pairc Esler	Ulster quarter-final
33.	30 April 2023	Armagh	4-10 - 0-12	Down	St Tiernach's Park	Ulster semi-final
34.	27 April 2024	Armagh	0-13 - 2-6	Down	St Tiernach's Park	Ulster semi-final
35.	3 May 2026	Armagh	3-33 - 0-13	Down	St Tiernach's Park	Ulster semi-final
