= Trevor Giles =

Irish Gaelic footballer

Personal information
- Native name: Trevor Mac Goill (Irish)
- Born: Skryne, County Meath

Sport
- Sport: Gaelic football
- Position: Half forward
Club
- Years: Club
- Skryne
Club titles
- Meath titles: 4
Inter-county
Years	County	Apps (scores)
1994–2005	Meath	47, (6–140)
Inter-county titles
- Leinster titles: 3
- All-Irelands: 2
- NFL: 1
- All Stars: 3

Trevor Giles is an Irish former Gaelic footballer for the Meath county team. Regarded as one of the best players of his generation, he plays club football for Skryne.

He came to prominence first when he won an All Ireland minor medal with Meath in 1992. In 1993 he moved on to the Under 21 team and won an All Ireland title coming on as a sub in the final. He would go on to win 2 All Ireland Senior medals, 3 Leinster Senior Football Championship medals & 1 National League Medals. He usually played in the half forward line for Meath. Trevor has won 3 All Star awards and was chosen as the All Stars Footballer of the Year in 1996 and 1999 (as of 2019 still the only player to accomplish this feat) and Texaco Footballer of the Year in 1999. Trevor had to deal with some injury setbacks in his football career, playing against Kildare in the 1998 Leinster final loss he ruptured his cruciate knee ligament, a serious injury which kept him out of the game for many months, but he returned in 1999 to have probably his best season of his playing career. In 2001 Meath made the All Ireland final but were well beaten by Galway. Since the 2005 season Trevor has not made himself available for selection for the Meath panel. He was said to have taken inspiration from the Kildare footballer Johnny Doyle.

Trevor represented Ireland in many of the annual International rules series against Australia. Trevor is a cousin of another Meath footballer Mick Lyons.

For his club Skryne he usually played at Center Half back, with whom he has won 4Meath Senior Football Championship Titles.

He was a selector when clubmate Mick O'Dowd managed Meath.

In May 2020, the Irish Independent named Giles at number seventeen in its "Top 20 footballers in Ireland over the past 50 years".

== Career statistics ==
Team	Season	Leinster		All-Ireland		Total	
Team	Season	Apps	Score	Apps	Score	Apps	Score
Meath	1994	3	0-08	0	0-00	3	0-08
Meath	1995	3	0-06	0	0-00	3	0-06
Meath	1996	3	1-14	3	1-13	6	2-27
Meath	1997	5	2-20	0	0-00	5	2-20
Meath	1998	3	0-09	0	0-00	3	0-09
Meath	1999	3	0-10	2	0-09	5	0-19
Meath	2000	1	0-05	0	0-00	1	0-05
Meath	2001	3	1-14	4	0-07	7	1-21
Meath	2002	2	0-07	3	0-06	5	0-13
Meath	2003	3	1-06	2	0-04	5	1-10
Meath	2004	2	0-02	1	0-01	3	0-03
Meath	2005	0	0-00	0	0-00	0	0-00
Total		31	5-101	15	1-40	46	6-141

Preceded by Peter Canavan (Tyrone)	All Stars Footballer of the Year; 1996	Succeeded by Maurice Fitzgerald (Kerry)
Preceded by Michael Donnellan (Galway)	Texaco Footballer of the Year; 1999	Succeeded by Seamus Moynihan (Kerry)
Preceded by Jarlath Fallon (Galway)	All Stars Footballer of the Year; 1999	Succeeded by Seamus Moynihan (Kerry)
