= Benny Murphy =

Fermanagh Gaelic footballer

Personal information
- Born: Enniskillen, County Fermanagh

Sport
- Sport: Gaelic football
- Position: Full Back
Club
- Years: Club
- Kinawley
Inter-county
- Years: County
- Fermanagh

Benny Murphy is a former Gaelic footballer who played for the Fermanagh county team for more than 20 years and in 2005 was picked at right corner-back on the Fermanagh Team of the Century. He played his club football with Kinawley. His son Ollie won two All Ireland medals with Meath in 1996 and 1999.
