= Brian Clarke (Gaelic footballer) =

Irish Gaelic footballer

Personal information
- Born: Killarney, County Kerry

Sport
- Sport: Gaelic football
- Position: Full Forward
Club
- Years: Club
- Dr. Croke's
Club titles
- Kerry titles: 1
- Munster titles: 0
- All-Ireland Titles: 0
Inter-county
Years	County	Apps (scores)
1996-1999	Kerry	4 (0-02)
Inter-county titles
- Munster titles: 1
- All-Irelands: 1 (as a sub)
- NFL: 1

Brian Clarke was a Gaelic footballer from Killarney, County Kerry. He played with Kerry during the 1990s. At club level he played with the famous Dr. Croke's club from Killarney.

== Club ==
At club level he played with the Dr. Croke's club from Killarney. He helped them win the Kerry Senior Football Championship in 2000. He also won a number of East Kerry Senior Football Championship titles.

== Schools ==
While a student at Killarney Community College he enjoyed success. He was part of the Kerry Vocational schools team that won the All-Ireland Vocational Schools Championship in 1992 by beating Offaly and in 1993 by beating Wicklow.

== Underage ==
Clarke first played with Kerry at minor level. He played in the 1992 and 1993 Munster championships but lost out to Cork both seasons.

He moved on to the Under 21 side in 1994, but again lost out to Cork. Having missed out on the 1995 championship he was back in the team for the 1996 campaign. He first linked up with the team when he scored a goal when he came in as a sub in the Munster final win over Clare. He was at full forward for the semi-final with Galway, where he scored 1-01 in a 3-09 to 0-12 win. He was again at full forward for the final with Cavan, a game where he scored a point in a 1-17 to 2-10 win and an All-Ireland medal for Clarke.

== Senior ==
He first joined the Kerry senior team straight out of minor when he played four games in the 1993/94 National League.

After a few years away he played his first championship game when he came on as a sub during Kerry's All-Ireland semi-final loss to Mayo.

He was back in the team during the 1996/97 League campaign. He played in five of Kerry's games, including the final win over Cork when he scored two points. He missed Kerry's Munster championship opener with Tipperary, but lined out at full forward in the Munster Senior Football Championship final win over Clare where he scored a point. He was full forward once more for the All Ireland semi final with Cavan where he again scored a point. He was on the subs once more for the All-Ireland final win over Mayo but saw no game time.

He played during the 1997/98 National League but see no game time during the championship. His last appearance with Kerry came in the Munster championship win over Tipperary in 1999.
