= 1999 All-Ireland Senior Football Championship =

Championship details
- Dates: 9 May – 26 September 1999
- Teams: 33

All-Ireland Champions
- Winning team: Meath (7th win)
- Captain: Graham Geraghty
- Manager: Seán Boylan

All-Ireland Finalists
- Losing team: Cork
- Captain: Philip Clifford
- Manager: Larry Tompkins

Provincial Champions
- Munster: Cork
- Leinster: Meath
- Ulster: Armagh
- Connacht: Mayo

Championship statistics
- No. matches played: 36
- Goals total: 76 (2.11 per game)
- Points total: 814 (22.61 per game)
- Top Scorer: Oisín McConville (3–18)
- Player of the Year: Trevor Giles

The 1999 Bank of Ireland All-Ireland Senior Football Championship was the 113th edition of the GAA's premier Gaelic football competition. The championship began on 9 May 1999 and ended on 26 September 1999.

Galway entered the championship as defending champions; however, they were beaten by Mayo in the Connacht final.

On 26 September 1999, Meath beat Cork by 1–11 to 1–8 in the All-Ireland final, thus winning their second All-Ireland title in four years and their seventh in all. In the process, they denied Cork the Double, the hurlers having claimed the Liam MacCarthy Cup two weeks previously.

== Format ==
The provincial championships were run on a knock-out basis as usual, with the provincial winners going on to contest the All-Ireland semi finals. The Leinster Senior Football Championship consisted of 2 preliminary rounds to determine the 8th team in the Leinster quarter finals.

The usual knock-out four-province setup was used. New York played in the Connacht Senior Football Championship for the first time. Normal format is back for the Munster championship with two quarter-finals and semi-finals.

== Results ==
=== Connacht Senior Football Championship ===
Quarter-finals
Leitrim	1–07
Roscommon	0–15
New York	0–10
Mayo	3–13
London	1–08
Galway	1–18

Semi-finals
Roscommon	0–10
Mayo	0–21
Sligo	1–07
Galway	1–17

Final
Mayo	1–14
Galway	1–10

==== Quarter-finals ====
30 May 1999
Quarter-final

Mayo	3–13 – 0–10	New York
M. Sheridan 0–6, C. MacManamam, D. Nestor 1–2 each, B. Maloney 1–0, J. Horan 0–3	Report	M. Slowey 0–3, W. O'Donnel, P. Mahoney 0–2 each, S. Cassidy, K. Keaveney, E. Cleary 0–1 each

McHale Park, Castlebar
Referee: S. Prior (Leitrim)

30 May 1999
Quarter-final

Roscommon	0–15 – 1–07	Leitrim
F. Dolan, E. Lohan 0–3 each, S. Lohan, L. Dowd, C. Kenneally, N. Dineen 0–2 each, D. Duggan 0–1	Report	C. Carroll 1–1, F. McBrien, A. Rooney, A. Charles, J. Ward, G. Bohan, P. Farrell 0–1 each

Páirc Sheáin Mhic Dhiarmada, Carrick on Shannon
Referee: B. Gorman (Armagh)

6 June 1999
Quarter-final

Galway	1–18 – 1–08	London
P. Joyce 1–5, N. Finnegan J. Fallon 0–4 each, D. Savage 0–2, S. Og de Paor, P. Clancy, T. Joyce 0–1 each,	Report	J. Grimes 1–1, T. McGivern 0–3, T. Maguire, P. Coggins, T. Murphy J. Gormley 0–1 each

Ruislip
Referee: E. Neary (Sligo)

==== Semi-finals ====
13 June 1999
Semi-final

Mayo	0–21 – 0–10	Roscommon
M Sheridan 0–9, J Casey 0–6, N Connelly, C MacManamann 0–2 each, J Horan, K Mortimer 0–1 each	Report	D Duggan 0–4, F O'Donnell 0–3, F Grehan 0–2, F Dolan 0–1

McHale Park, Castlebar
Referee: Brian White (Wexford)

27 June 1999
Semi-final

Sligo	3–07 – 1–13	Galway
B. Walsh 2–0, P. Durcan 1–1, E. O'Hara, K. Killeen, P. Taylor 0–2 each	Report	P. Joyce 0–4, D. Savage 1–0, P. Clancy 0–3, J. Donnellan, M. Donnellan 0–2 each; S. O'g de Paor, K. Walsh 0–1 each

Markievicz Park, Sligo
Attendance: 17,000
Referee: Paddy Russell (Tipperary)

4 July 1999
Semi-final Replay

Sligo	1–07 – 1–17	Galway
P. Taylor 0–3, D. Sloyane 0–2, J. McPartland, K. Killeen 0–1 each	Report	J. Donnellan 0–7, S. de Paor 1–2, J. Fallon, D. Savage 0–3 each, N. Finnegan, P. Joyce 0–1 each

Tuam Stadium, Tuam
Attendance: 20,000
Referee: Paddy Russell (Tipperary)

==== Final ====
18 July 1999
Final

Mayo	1–14 – 1–10	Galway
D. Nestor 1–1, J. Horan 0–5, M. Sheridan 0–3, K. Mortimer, C. McManaman, K. McDonald, P. Fallon, J. Nallen 0–1 each	Report	P. Joyce 1–2, N. Finnegan 0–3, J. Donnellan, D. Savage 0–2 each, J. Fallon 0–1

Tuam Stadium, Tuam
Attendance: 31,000
Referee: Brian White (Wexford)

=== Leinster Senior Football Championship ===
1st round
Longford	1–13, 2–15
Wexford	0–16, 0–11

2nd round
Westmeath	3–17
Longford	2–09

Quarter-finals
Laois	1–16
Westmeath	1–08
Louth	0–14
Dublin	2–15
Offaly	0–11
Kildare	0–07
Wicklow	0–06
Meath	2–10

Semi-finals
Laois	1–11
Dublin	0–16
Offaly	0–09
Meath	1–13

Final
Dublin	0–12
Meath	1–14

==== 1st preliminary round ====
9 May 1999
Round 1

Westmeath	2–10 – 1–08	Carlow
G. Heavin 0–9, M. Flanagan 2–0, M. Staunton 0–1.		G. Ware 1–0, M. Dowling 0–3, J. Morrissey 0–3, N. Doyle 0–1, J. Nevin 0–1.

Dr. Cullen Park, Carlow
Referee: N. Barrett (Cork)

9 May 1999
Round 1

Longford	1–13 – 0–16	Wexford
P. Davis 0–6, P. Barden 1–2, E. Barden 0–2, D. Hanniffy 0–1, T. Drake 0–1, N. Sheridan 0–1.	Report	S. Doran 0–5, J. Hegarty 0–3, L. O'Brien 0–3, M. Mahon 0–2, R. Stafford 0–1, J. Darcy 0–1, J. Byrne 0–1.

O'Kennedy Park, New Ross
Referee: N. Cooney (Offaly)

16 May 1999
Round 1 replay

Longford	2–15 – 0–11	Wexford
P. Barden, T. Smullen 1–4 each, P. Davis 0–3, E. Barden 0–2, T. Drake, S. Carroll 0–1 each	Report	J. Hegarty 0–4, N. O'Brien 0–3, S. Doran, J. Lawlor 0–2 each

Pearse Park, Longford
Referee: N Cooney (Offaly)

==== 2nd preliminary round ====
30 May 1999
Round 2

Westmeath	3–17 – 2–09	Longford
D. Dolan 1–7, G. Heavin 1–5, M. Flanagan 1–0, R. O'Connell 0–2, D. O'Shaughnessy, A. Canning, S. Colleary 0–1 each	Report	E. Barden 0–4, N. Sheridan, T. Smullen 1–0 each, P. Barden 0–2, E. Ledwith, D. Hannify, P. Davis 0–1 each

Cusack Park, Mullingar
Referee: Brian White (Wexford)

==== Quarter-finals ====
6 June 1999
Quarter-final

Dublin	2–15 – 0–14	Louth
D. Darcy 0–5, C. Whelan 0–4, I. Robertson, M. O'Keeffe 1–0 each, B. O'Brien 0–3, B. Stynes 0–2, P. Christie 0–1	Report	A. Doherty 0–5, C. Kely 0–3, S. O'Hanlon 0–2, A. Hoey, M. Farrelly, C. O'Hanlon, P. McGinnity 0–1 each

Croke Park, Dublin
Attendance: 39,039
Referee: John Bannon (Longford)

6 June 1999
Quarter-final

Meath	2–10 – 0–06	Wicklow
G. Geraghty 1–4, T. Dowd 1–2, T. Giles 0–2, R. Magee, O. Murphy 0–1 each	Report	B. O'Donovan, D. Coffey, F. Daly, D. McMahon, R. Coffey, T. Doyle 0–1

Croke Park, Dublin
Attendance: 39,039
Referee: Paddy Russell (Tipperary)

13 June 1999
Quarter-final

Laois	1–16 – 1–08	Westmeath
D. Delaney 0–7, C. Conway 1–1, I. Fitzgerald 0–3, H. Emerson 0–2, K. Fitzpatrick, S. Kelly, T. Kelly 0–1 each	Report	D. Dolan 1–6, G. Heavin, M. Flanagan 0–1 each

Croke Park, Dublin
Referee: Brian Crowe (Cavan)

13 June 1999
Quarter-final

Offaly	0–11 – 0–07	Kildare
P. Brady, C. McManus, Colm Quinn 0–2 each; F. Cullen, V. Claffey, B. O'Brien, D. Connolly 0–1 each.	Report	K. O'Dwyer 0–3, M. Lynch 0–2, D. Kerrigan, D. Earley 0–1 each.

Croke Park, Dublin
Referee: Pat McEnaney (Monaghan)

==== Semi-finals ====
27 June 1999
Semi-final

Dublin	1–11 – 0–14	Laois
I. Robertson 1–2, J. Gavin 0–3, D. Darcy 0–2, K. Galvin, B. Stynes, D. Farrell, P. Christie 0–1 each	Report	D. Delaney 0–5, D. Sweeney, H. Emerson, S. Kelly, 0–2 each

Croke Park, Dublin
Attendance: 28,371
Referee: S. Prior (Leitrim)

4 July 1999
Semi-final

Meath	1–13 – 0–09	Offaly
O. Murphy 1–3, T. Dowd 0–4, T. Giles 0–3, D. Curtis, E. Kelly, G. Geraghty 0–1 each	Report	D. Connolly 0–3, C. McManus 0–2, G. Grennan, J. Stewart, P. Brady, V. Claffey 0 1 each

Croke Park, Dublin
Attendance: 34,030
Referee: Mick Curley (Galway)

18 July 1999
Semi-final Replay

Dublin	0–16 – 1–11	Laois
D. Darcy 0–5, I. Robertson 0–4, B. Stynes 0–3, C. Whelan, D. Farrell, E. Sheehy, J. Gavin 0–1 each	Report	I. Fitgzerald 0–4, C. Conway 1–1; S. Kelly, H. Emerson, D. Delaney 0–2 each

Croke Park, Dublin
Attendance: 33,268
Referee: S. Prior (Leitrim)

==== Final ====
1 August 1999
Final

Meath	1–14 – 0–12	Dublin
O. Murphy 1–5, T. Giles 0–5, G. Geraghty 0–2, N. Nestor, H. Traynor 0–1 each	Report	D. Darcy 0–6, J. Gavin 0–5, C. Whelan 0–1

Croke Park, Dublin
Attendance: 56,315
Referee: Mick Curley (Galway)

=== Munster Senior Football Championship ===
Quarter-finals
Kerry	1–11
Tipperary	0–08
Waterford	0–04
Cork	3–23

Semi-finals
Kerry	3–17
Clare	0–12
Limerick	1–06
Cork	4–13

Final
Kerry	2–04
Cork	2–10

==== Quarter-finals ====
23 May 1999
Quarter-final

Kerry	1–11 – 0–08	Tipperary
M. Fitzgerald 0–4, G. Murphy 1–0, A. MacGearailt 0–3, D. Ó Sé, N. Kennelly, J. McGlynn, Billy O'Shea 0–1 each	Report	D. Browne 0–4, P. Lambert 0–2, S. Maher, D. Byrne 0–1 each

Austin Stack Park, Tralee
Referee: Michael Collins (Cork)

23 May 1999
Quarter-final

Cork	3–23 – 0–04	Waterford
D. O'Neill 1–5, Mark O'Sullivan 1–4, A. Dorgan 1–2, J. Kavanagh 0–5, P. Clifford 0–4, C. O'Sullivan 0–2, D. Davis 0–1	Report	M. Power 0–2, R. Power, G. Hurney 0–1 each

Fraher Field, Dungarvan
Referee: A. Mangan (Kerry)

==== Semi-finals ====
20 June 1999
Semi-final

Cork	4–13 – 1–06	Limerick
P. O'Mahony 1–9, J. Kavanagh 1–2, A. O'Regan, F. Murray 1–0 each, M. O'Sullivan, A. Dorgan 0–1 each	Report	M. Reidy 1–2, N. Mulvihill, M. O'Doherty, J. Quane, D. Ryan 0–1 each

Páirc Uí Rinn, Cork
Attendance: 5,616
Referee: S. McCormack (Meath)

20 June 1999
Semi-final

Kerry	3–17 – 0–12	Clare
J. Crowley 2–0, M. Fitzgerald 0–6, A. MacGearailt 0–4, D. Ó Cinneide 1–1, J. McGlynn 0–3, N. Kennelly, D. Ó Sé, E. Breen 0–1 each	Report	D. Russell 0–3, P. McMahon, B. McMahon, C. Mullen 0–2 each, M. O'Connell, K. Considine, O. O'Dwyer 0–1 each

Fitzgerald Stadium, Killarney
Attendance: 18,505
Referee: Mick Curley (Galway)

==== Final ====
18 July 1999
Final

Cork	2–10 – 2–04	Kerry
P. Clifford, P. O'Mahony 0–4 each, F. Collins, F. Murray 1–0 each, J. Kavanagh, Michael O'Sullivan 0–1 each	Report	R. MacGearailt 2–0, J. Crowley 0,2; J. McGlynn, W. Kirby 0–1 each

Páirc Uí Chaoimh, Cork
Attendance: 42,755
Referee: Pat McEnaney (Monaghan)

=== Ulster Senior Football Championship ===
Preliminary round
Monaghan	1–10
Fermanagh	2–12

Quarter-finals
Cavan	0–05
Derry	2–14
Donegal	0–12
Armagh	2–11
Antrim	0–14
Down	1–15
Fermanagh	0–08
Tyrone	0–18

Semi-finals
Derry	0–12
Armagh	1–10
Down	2–14
Tyrone	0–15

Final
Armagh	3–12
Down	0–10

==== Preliminary round ====
30 May 1999
Preliminary round

Fermanagh	2–12 – 1–10	Monaghan
T. Brewster 0–6, S. King 2–2, R. Gallagher 0–2, R. Johnson, L. McBarron 0–1 each	Report	D. Smyth 1–5, I. Larmer 0–2, P. Duffy, F. McEneany, J. Coyle 0–1 each

St Tiernach's Park, Clones
Attendance: 12,121
Referee: M. Convery (Derry)

==== Quarter-finals ====
6 June 1999
Quarter-final

Armagh	1–12 – 2–09	Donegal
O. McConville 0–6, B. McKeever 1–1, D. Marsden, C. O'Rourke 0–2 each, P. McGrane 0–1	Report	T. Boyle 1–2, J. Duffy 1–1, B. Devenney, B. Roper 0–2 each, J. McGuinness, N. Hegarty 0–1 each

MacCumhaill Park, Ballybofey
Attendance: 18,000
Referee: Mick Curley (Galway)

13 June 1999
Quarter-final Replay

Armagh	2–11 – 0–12	Donegal
C. O'Rourke 1–1, P. McKeever 0–3, D. Marsden 1–0, O. McConville, J. McIntee 0–2 each, A. McCann, A. O'Neill, P. McGrane 0–1 each	Report	T. Boyle 0–6, M. Hegarty 0–2, J. McGuinness, M. Crossan, B. Devanny, A. Sweeney 0–1 each

St Tiernach's Park, Clones
Attendance: 16,000
Referee: Mick Curley (Galway)

20 June 1999
Quarter-final

Derry	2–14 – 0–05	Cavan
E. Muldoon 1–3, A. Tuohill 0–4, D. Dougan 1–0, J. Brolly, P. McFlynn, J. McBride 0–2 each, S. Downey 0–1	Report	R. Carolan 0–4, J. Coffey 0–1

Breffni Park, Cavan
Attendance: 16,000
Referee: Paddy Russell (Tipperary)

20 June 1999
Quarter-final

Down	1–15 – 0–14	Antrim
S. Ward 0–5, M. Linden 1–2, C. McCabe 0–4, S. Mulholland, B. Burns, P. Higgins, M. McGill 0–1 each	Report	J. McManus 0–4, K. Madden 0–4, A. Finegan 0–3, R. Hamill 0–2, P. McCann, G. Adams 0–1

Pairc Esler, Newry
Attendance: 12,000
Referee: B. Doheny (Louth)

27 June 1999
Quarter-final

Tyrone	0–18 – 0–08	Fermanagh
A. Cush 0–7, P. Canavan 0–4, B. Dooher 0–2, M. McGleenan. C. MacAnallen, G. Cavlan, C. Loughran, S. O'Neill 0–1 each	Report	T. Brewster 0–3, R. Gallagher, S. King 0–2 each, S. Maguire 0–1

St Tiernach's Park, Clones
Referee: B. Gorman (Armagh)

==== Semi-finals ====
5 July 1999
Semi-final

Armagh	1–10 – 0–12	Derry
O. McConville 1–2, E. Marsden, C. O'Rourke, P. McKeever, P. McGrane 0 2 each	Report	A. Tohill 0–4, J. Downey 0–2, J. Brolly, D. Dougan, J. McBride, P. McFlynn, J. Cassidy, G. Coleman 0–1 each

St Tiernach's Park, Clones
Attendance: 24,753
Referee: John Bannon (Longford)

12 July 1999
Semi-final

Down	2–14 – 0–15	Tyrone
C. McCabe 2–3, R. Carr, M. Linden 0–3 each, S. Ward, S. Mulholland 0–2 each, P. Higgins 0–1	Report	A. Cush 0–4, B. Dooher, P. Canavan 0–3, G. Calvan 0–2, E. Gormley, C. Loughran, R. McGarrity 0–1 each

Casement Park, Belfast
Referee: Pat McEnaney (Monaghan)

==== Final ====
1 August 1999
Final

Armagh	3–12 – 0–10	Down
O. McConville 2–7, D. Marsden 1–2, T. McEntee, P. McGrane, J. McEntee 0–1 each	Report	S. Mulholland 0–4, C. McCabe 0–2, S. Ward, B. Burns, R. Carr, G. McCartan 0–1 each

St Tiernach's Park, Clones
Attendance: 36,345
Referee: Paddy Russell (Tipperary)

=== All-Ireland Senior Football Championship ===
Semi-finals
Cork	2–12
Mayo	0–12
Meath	0–15
Armagh	2–05

Final
Cork	1–08
Meath	1–11

==== Semi-finals ====
22 August 1999
Semi-final

Cork	2–12 – 0–12	Mayo
P. Clifford 1–4, F. Murray 1–1, P. O'Mahony 0–3, D. Davis 0–2, M. O'Sullivan, J. Kavanagh 0–1 each	Report	K. McDonald 0–4, J. Horan, M. Sheridan 0–3 each, K. Mortimer, D. Brady 0–1 each

Croke Park, Dublin
Attendance: 58,496
Referee: John Bannon (Longford)

29 August 1999
Semi-final

Meath	0–15 – 2–05	Armagh
T. Giles 0–5, E. Kelly 0–3, R. Magee, D. Curtis 0–2 each, E. McManus, N. Nestor, G. Geraghty 0–1 each	Report	D. Marsden 1–1, K. Hughes 1–0, P. McKeever 0–4

Croke Park, Dublin
Attendance: 60,589
Referee: Paddy Russell (Tipperary)

==== Final ====
26 September 1999
Final

Meath	1–11 – 1–08	Cork
T. Giles 0–4, O. Murphy 1–0, E. Kelly, G. Geraghty 0–3 each, D. Curtis 0–1	Report	P. Clifford 0–5, J. Kavanagh 1–1, Mark O'Sullivan, P. O'Mahony 0–1 each

Croke Park, Dublin
Attendance: 63,226
Referee: Mick Curley (Galway)

== Statistics ==
=== Miscellaneous ===
- The Munster Quarter-final Cork vs Waterford was the worst championship defeat for Waterford.
- Both red and yellow cards were introduced to all matches played from this year onwards.
- New York, in their first season in the Connacht championship, like London play each county in rotation.
- On 20 June 1999, the Munster semi-final between Cork and Limerick was the first ever championship game played at Páirc Uí Rinn, Cork.
- Armagh vs Down Ulster final for the first time since 1981 also Armagh won the Ulster title for the first time since 1982.
- Meath-Armagh All Ireland semi-final was the first championship meeting between the teams.

=== Top scorers ===
Overall

Rank	Player	County	Tally	Total	Matches	Average
1	Oisín McConville	Armagh	3–17	26	5	5.20
2	Maurice Sheridan	Mayo	0–21	21	4	5.25
3	Podsie O'Mahony	Cork	1–17	20	4	5.00
3	Philip Clifford	Cork	1–17	20	4	5.00
5	Dessie Dolan	Westmeath	2–13	19	2	9.50
5	Trevor Giles	Meath	0–19	19	5	3.80
7	Ollie Murphy	Meath	3–9	18	5	3.60
7	Pádraic Joyce	Galway	2–12	18	4	4.50
7	Ger Heavin	Westmeath	1–15	18	3	6.00
7	Declan Darcy	Dublin	0–18	18	4	4.50
4	Diarmaid Marsden	Armagh	3–7	16	5	5.20

Single game

Rank	Player	County	Tally	Total	Opposition
1	Oisín McConville	Armagh	2–7	13	Down
2	Podsie O'Mahony	Cork	1–9	12	Limerick
3	Dessie Dolan	Westmeath	1–7	10	Longford
4	Ciaran McCabe	Down	2–3	9	Tyrone
4	Ger Heavin	Westmeath	0–9	9	Carlow
4	Dessie Dolan	Westmeath	1–6	9	Laois
4	Maurice Sheridan	Mayo	0–9	9	Roscommon
8	Shane King	Fermanagh	2–2	8	Monaghan
8	Declan Smyth	Monaghan	1–5	8	Fermanagh
8	Pádraic Joyce	Galway	1–5	8	London
8	Ger Heavin	Westmeath	1–5	8	Longford
8	Ollie Murphy	Meath	1–5	8	Dublin
8	Damien O'Neill	Cork	1–5	8	Waterford
