= Cathal Sheridan (dual player) =

Irish hurler and Gaelic footballer

Personal information
- Born: County Meath
- Occupation: Garda

Sport
Clubs
- Years: Club
- Moynalvy; Kilcock; Summerhill; Kiltale (H)
Inter-county
- Years: County
- Meath (H); Meath (F); Kildare (H)
Inter-county titles
| | Football | Hurling |
| Leinster Titles | 1 | 0 |
| All-Ireland Titles | 1 | 0 |
| League titles | 0 | 0 |
| All-Stars | 0 | 0 |

Cathal Sheridan is a former dual player from County Meath, Ireland. He played both Gaelic football and hurling at all levels with Meath and hurling with the Kildare county team. He won All Ireland football medals at Minor, Under 21 and Senior with Meath in the 1990s as well as a Junior medal in 2003. In 2003 he created his own piece of history by becoming the only Meath player to win All Ireland medals at Minor, Under 21, Junior and Senior level.

He played his club football and hurling with Moynalvey GAA and Kiltale GAA early in his career, transferring to Kilcock, when his job as a Garda required him to move to Kildare.
