= 1996 All-Ireland Senior Football Championship =

Football championship

Championship details
- Dates: 12 May 1996 – 29 September 1996
- Teams: 32

All-Ireland Champions
- Winning team: Meath (6th win)
- Captain: Tommy Dowd
- Manager: Seán Boylan

All-Ireland Finalists
- Losing team: Mayo
- Captain: Noel Connelly
- Manager: John Maughan

Provincial Champions
- Munster: Kerry
- Leinster: Meath
- Ulster: Tyrone
- Connacht: Mayo

Championship statistics
- No. matches played: 34
- Top Scorer: Maurice Sheridan (1–33)
- Player of the Year: Martin O'Connell; Trevor Giles

The 1996 Bank of Ireland All-Ireland Senior Football Championship was the 110th staging of the All-Ireland Senior Football Championship, the Gaelic Athletic Association's premier inter-county Gaelic football tournament. The championship began on 12 May 1996 and ended on 29 September 1996.

Dublin entered the championship as the defending champions, however, they were defeated by Meath in the Leinster final.

On 29 September 1996, Meath won the championship following a 2–9 to 1–11 defeat of Mayo in a replay of the All-Ireland final. This was their sixth All-Ireland title and their first in eight championship seasons.

Mayo's Maurice Sheridan was the championship's top scorer with 1–33. Meath's Martin O'Connell was the choice for Texaco Footballer of the Year, while his teammate Trevor Giles was selected as the Powerscreen Footballer of the Year.

== Leinster Championship format change ==
The Leinster football championship pre-Quarter final had 2 First-Round & 1 Second-Round game.

== Provincial championships ==
=== Munster Senior Football Championship ===
Quarter-finals
Kerry	2–15
Tipperary	1–7
Cork	2–19
Limerick	1–6

Semi-finals
Kerry	3–16
Waterford	0–8
Clare	1–16
Cork	2–16

Final
Kerry	0–14
Cork	0–11

Quarter-finals

12 May 1996 Quarter-final	Limerick	1–6 – 2–19	Cork	FitzGerald Park, Kilmallock
	C McGill 1–2, T Cummins 0–2, J Quane 0–1, B Ryan 0–1.		M O'Sullivan 1–2, J Kavanagh 0–5, C Corkery 1–1, J O'Driscoll 0–4, B Corcoran 0–2, M Cronin 0–2, C O'Sullivan 0–1, D Culloty 0–1, N Cahalane 0–1.	Attendance: 3,000; Referee: T. Sugrue (Kerry)

19 May 1996 Quarter-final	Tipperary	1–7 – 2–15	Kerry	Ned Hall Park, Clonmel
	P Lambert 1–3, B Cummins 0–2, M Sheahan 0–1, B Burke 0–1.		D Ó Cinnéide 1–6, J Crowley 1–2, B Driscoll 0–2, G Farrell 0–2, B O'Shea 0–2, C McCarthy 0–1.	Attendance: 5,000; Referee: K Walsh (Clare)

Semi-finals

22 June 1996 Semi-final	Waterford	0–8 – 3–16	Kerry	Fraher Field, Dungarvan
	A Fitzgerald 0–3, M Kiely 0–2, P Ferncombe 0–2, M Power 0–1.		M Fitzgerald 2–2, D Ó Cinnéide 0–6, B Driscoll 1–0, L Hassett 0–3, D Daly 0–3, E Breen 0–1, B O'Shea 0–1.	Referee: S O'Keeffe (Cork)

23 June 1996 Semi-final	Clare	0–10 – 1–7	Cork	Cusack Park, Ennis
	A O'Keeffe 0–7, M Daly 0–1, G Keane 0–1, J Enright 0–1.		M O'Sullivan 1–1, C Corkery 0–2, J Kavanagh 0–2, M o'Donovan 0–1, J O'Driscoll 0–1.	Referee: P Russell (Tipperary)

30 June 1996 Semi-final replay	Cork	2–16 – 1–16 (aet)	Clare	Páirc Uí Chaoimh, Cork
	J Kavanagh 0–5, D Davis 1–1, J Buckley 1–1, C Corkery 0–4, C O'Sullivan 0–3, P McGrath 0–2.		G Keane 1–2, A O'Keeffe 0–5, F McInerney 0–4, M Hynes 0–2, G Killeen 0–1, P Conway 0–1, F Lohan 0–1.	Attendance: 12,000; Referee: P Russell (Tipperary)

Final

21 July 1996 Final	Cork	0–11 – 0–14	Kerry	Páirc Uí Chaoimh, Cork
	C Corkery 0–3, J Kavanagh 0–3, P McGrath 0–2, J Buckley 0–1, L Honohan 0–1, N Cahalane 0–1.		M Fitzgerald 0–5, D Ó Cinnéide 0–3, B O'Shea 0–2, K Burns 0–1, E Breen 0–1, B Driscoll 0–1, L Hassett 0–1.	Referee: K Walsh (Clare)

=== Leinster Senior Football Championship ===
1st Round
Carlow	4–17
Wexford	1–11
Wicklow	2–11
Longford	2–10

2nd Round
Carlow	3–10
Wicklow	2–10

Quarter-finals
Meath	0–24
Carlow	0–6
Laois	3–9
Kildare	0–13
Westmeath	0–11
Dublin	1–18
Louth	3–8
Offaly	0–12

Semi-finals
Meath	2–14
Laois	1–9
Dublin	1–9
Louth	0–8

Final
Meath	0–10
Dublin	0–8

First round

12 May 1996 First round	Carlow	4–17 – 1–11	Wexford	Dr. Cullen Park, Carlow
	A Keating 1–8, W Quinlan 2–2, C Hayden 1–1, J Nevin 0–2, J Hayden 0–2, J Murphy 0–1, S Kavanagh 0–1.		L O'Brien 0–8, J Hegarty 1–1, S Doran 0–1, J Kenny 0–1.	Referee: P McCann (Westmeath)

12 May 1996 First round	Longford	2–10 – 2–11	Wicklow	Pearse Park, Longford
	D Barry 2–5, E Barden 0–2, C Fox 0–2, P Davis 0–1.		C Daye 0–5, K O'Brien 0–4, K Byrne 1–0, F Mulligan 1–0, R Danne 0–1, B Dunne 0–1.	Attendance: 8,000; Referee: S McCormack (Meath)

Second round

26 May 1996 Second round	Carlow	4–10 – 3–10	Wicklow	St. Conleth's Park, Newbridge
	A Keating 0–7, C Hayden 2–0, W Quinlan 1–0, H Brennan 1–0, S Kavanagh 0–2, N Doyle 0–1.		K Byrne 1–2, C Daye 1–1, K O'Brien 0–4, J Behan 1–0, F Mulligan 0–1, M Davis 0–1, P McGillycuddy 0–1.	Referee: A Walsh (Dublin)

Quarter-finals

9 June 1996 Quarter-final	Louth	3–8 – 0–12	Offaly	Páirc Tailteann, Navan
	R O'Neill 2–0, O Reilly 1–1, C Kelly 0–3, A Doherty 0–2, S O'Hanlon 0–1, C O'Hanlon 0–1.		D Reynolds 0–6, C Kenny 0–2, M Daly 0–1, P O'Reilly 0–1, F Cullen 0–1, R Mooney 0–1.	Attendance: 27,000; Referee: P Casserley (Westmeath)

9 June 1996 Quarter-final	Westmeath	0–11 – 1–18	Dublin	Páirc Tailteann, Navan
	N Dolan 0–6, P Conway 0–1, K Lyons 0–1, T Ormsby 0–1, J Cooney 0–1, M Flanagan 0–1.		C Redmond 0–5, K Barr 1–0, J McNally 0–3, D Farrell 0–3, N Guiden 0–1, D O'Brien 0–1, P Curran 0–1, E Heery 0–1, B Stynes 0–1, P Bealin 0–1, J Gavin 0–1.	Referee: N Cooney (Offaly)

16 June 1996 Quarter-final	Meath	0–24 – 0–6	Carlow	Croke Park, Dublin
	T Giles 0–7, E Kelly 0–5, B Reilly 0–3, B Callaghan 0–3, T Dowd 0–2, G Geraghty, P Reynolds, M Reilly, D Curtis 0–1 each.		A Keating 0–4, N Doyle 0–1, J Hayden 0–1.

16 June 1996 Quarter-final	Laois	3–9 – 0–13	Kildare	Croke Park, Dublin
	L Turley 2–0, T Bowe 1–0, M Lawlor 0–3, I Fitzgerald 0–3, D Delaney 0–1, H Emerson 0–1, T Maher 0–1.		E McCormack 0–4, N Buckley 0–2, T Sullivan 0–2, A Rainbow 0–1, M Lynch 0–1, D O'Connell 0–1, P McCormack 0–1, J Whelan 0–1.	Referee: J Bannon (Longford)

Semi-finals

30 June 1996 Semi-final	Dublin	1–9 – 0–8	Louth	Páirc Tailteann, Navan
	C Redmond 0–5, J McNally 1–1, P Bealin 0–1, J Gavin 0–1, N Guiden 0–1.		C Kelly 0–3, C O'Hanlon 0–2, A Doherty 0–2, A Rooney 0–1.	Referee: P Casserly (Westmeath)

7 July 1996 Semi-final	Meath	2–14 – 1–9	Laois	Croke Park, Dublin
	T Giles 1–3, B Reilly 1–2, G Geraghty 0–3, E Kelly 0–3, T Dowd 0–2, B Callaghan 0–1.		D Delaney 0–4, H Emerson 1–0, I Fitzgerald 0–2, D Lalor 0–1, PJ Dempsey 0–1, L Turley 0–1.	Referee: A Walsh (Dublin)

Final

28 July 1996 Final	Meath	0–10 – 0–8	Dublin	Croke Park, Dublin
	T Giles 0–4, T Dowd 0–2, B Reilly 0–2, E Kelly 0–1, B Callaghan 0–1.		C Redmond 0–3, C Whelan 0–2, E Herry 0–1, B Stynes 0–1, D Farrell 0–1.	Attendance: 55,182; Referee: B White (Wexford)

=== Connacht Senior Football Championship ===
Quarter-finals
Mayo	1–11
London	1–5
Galway	0–19
Sligo	2–7

Semi-finals
Mayo	0–14
Roscommon	0–10
Leitrim	2–11
Galway	2–13

Final
Mayo	3–9
Galway	1–11

Quarter-finals

26 May 1996 Quarter-final	Sligo	1–11 – 1–11	Galway	Markievicz Park, Sligo
	P Taylor 1–5, F Feeney 0–2, P Newton 0–1, J Kenny 0–1, E O'Hara 0–1, C O'Meara 0–1.		N Finnegan 1–2, J Fallon 0–4, D Meehan 0–2, S Walsh 0–2, T Mannion 0–1.	Referee: S Prior (Leitrim)

2 June 1996 Quarter-final	London	1–5 – 1–11	Mayo	Emerald GAA Grounds, Ruislip
	S McGrellis 1–0, A Creamer 0–2, M Thynne 0–1, T Maguire 0–1, S Hehir 0–1.		M Sheridan 0–9, D Sweeney 1–0, L McHale 0–1, N Connelly 0–1.	Referee: R McCormack (Roscommon)

9 June 1996 Quarter-final replay	Galway	0–19 – 2–7	Sligo	Tuam Stadium, Tuam
	S Walsh 0–8, J Fallon 0–3, D Meehan 0–2, F Gavin 0–2, S Óg de Paor 0–1, A Leonard 0–1, T Wilson 0–1, N Finnegan 0–1.		P Taylor 0–5, P Seevers 1–1, J Kenny 1–0, E O'Hara 0–1.	Referee: S Prior (Leitrim)

Semi-finals

16 June 1996 Semi-final	Galway	2–13 – 2–11	Leitrim	Tuam Stadium, Tuam
	S Walsh 1–2, N Finnegan 0–5, T Mannion 1–0, J Fallon 0–2, D Meehan 0–2, F O'Neill 0–1, S Óg de Paor 0–1.		G Bohan 0–6, J Ward 1–1, D Darcy 1–1, N Moran 0–2, G Dugdale 0–1.	Referee: S McHale (Mayo)

23 June 1996 Semi-final	Roscommon	0–11 – 0–14	Mayo	Dr. Hyde Park, Roscommon
	D Duggan 0–8, C Heneghan 0–1, D Connellan 0–1, N O'Donoghue 0–1.		M Sheridan 0–6, L McHale 0–2, J Horan 0–2, R Dempsey 0–1, J Nallen 0–1, C McManamon 0–1, D Nestor 0–1.	Referee: M Curley (Galway)

Final

21 July 1996 Final	Mayo	3–9 – 1–11	Galway	McHale Park, Castlebar
	M Sheridan 1–3, J Casey 1–2, R Dempsey 1–0, A McGarry 0–1, J Horan 0–1, C McManamon 0–1, PJ Loftus 0–1.		F O'Neill 1–0, S Walsh 0–3, N Finnegan 0–3, J Fallon 0–2, D Meehan 0–2, K Walsh 0–1.	Referee: F Finan (Sligo)

=== Ulster Senior Football Championship ===
Preliminary Round
Down	1–9
Donegal	0–11

Quarter-finals
Tyrone	1–18
Fermanagh	0–9
Derry	1–16
Armagh	1–13
Cavan	1–15
Antrim	1–11
Monaghan	0–9
Down	0–14

Semi-finals
Tyrone	1–13
Derry	1–8
Cavan	0–13
Down	1–13

Final
Tyrone	1–9
Down	0–9

Preliminary round

26 May 1996 Preliminary round	Down	1–9 – 0–11	Donegal	St. Tiernach's Park, Clones
	C Deegan 1–1, G McCartan 0–3, J Treanor 0–2, M Linden 0–2, DJ Kane 0–1.		M Boyle 0–3, J McHugh 0–2, T Boyle 0–2, B Roper 0–1, JB Gallagher 0–1, D Diver 0–1, N Hegarty 0–1.	Referee: B White (Wexford)

Quarter-finals

2 June 1996 Quarter-final	Derry	1–13 – 1–6	Armagh	Celtic Park, Derry
	A Tohill 0–7, J Brolly 1–2, SM Lockhart 0–1, J McGurk 0–1, S Downey 0–1, E Gormley 0–1.		J McNulty 1–0, D Marsden 0–3, G Houlahan 0–3.	Referee: M McGrath (Donegal)

9 June 1996 Quarter-final	Tyrone	1–18 – 0–9	Fermanagh	Healy Park, Omagh
	Peter Canavan 1–7, A Cush 0–3, J Gormley 0–3, S McLaughlin 0–2, B Dooher 0–2, D Gormley 0–1.		R Gallagher 0–4, S King 0–2, C Curran 0–2, K Donnelly 0–1.	Referee: M Cranny (Down)

16 June 1996 Quarter-final	Antrim	1–11 – 1–15	Cavan	Casement Park, Belfast
	A Craig 1–1, C McCabe 0–3, J Wilson 0–3, C O'Neill 0–2, D McPeake 0–1.		R Carolan 0–7, J Reilly 1–1, L Reilly 0–2, B Morris 0–1, S King 0–1, A Connolly 0–1, P Reilly 0–1, D McCabe 0–1.	Referee: M McBrian (Fermanagh)

23 June 1996 Quarter-final	Monaghan	0–9 – 0–14	Down	St. Tiernach's Park, Clones
	D SMyth 0–4, M Slowey 0–3, D Loughman 0–1, S McGinnity 0–1.		G McCartan 0–3, P Sloan 0–2, M Linden 0–2, J McCartan 0–1, P Withnell 0–1, F Caulfield 0–1, G Mason 0–1, M McGill 0–1, DJ Kane 0–1, J Treanor 0–1.	Attendance: 21,005; Referee: J Curran (County Tyrone)

Semi-finals

30 June 1996 Semi-final	Tyrone	1–13 – 1–8	Derry	St. Tiernach's Park, Clones
	Peter Canavan 1–5, A Cush 0–3, C McBride 0–2, B Dooher 0–1, B Gormley 0–1, S Lawn 0–1.		J Brolly 0–4, D Heaney 1–0, A Tohill 0–2, S Downey 0–1, T Scullion 0–1.	Referee: P McEneaney (Monaghan)

7 July 1996 Semi-final	Cavan	0–13 – 1–13	Down	St. Tiernach's Park, Clones
	Jason Reilly 0–3, F Cahill 0–3, D McCabe 0–2, A Connolly 0–1, F Crowe 0–1, A Forde 0–1, P Reilly 0–1, R Carolan 0–1.		G McCartan 1–1, J Treanor 0–4, G Mason 0–3, M Magill 0–1, R Carr 0–1, M Linden 0–1, P Withnell 0–1, G Blaney 0–1.	Attendance: 25,237; Referee: J Curran (County Tyrone)

Final

28 July 1996 Final	Tyrone	1–9 – 0–9	Down	St. Tiernach's Park, Clones
	Peter Canavan 1–1, B Dooher 0–3, A Cush 0–2, B Gormley 0–1, Paschal Canavan 0–1, G Cavlan 0–1.		G McCartan 0–3, R Carr 0–2, J Treanor 0–2, G Blaney 0–1, C Murray 0–1.	Attendance: 33,000; Referee: P McEneaney (Monaghan)

== All-Ireland Senior Football Championship ==
Semi-finals

11 August 1996 Semi-final	Mayo	2–13 – 1–10	Kerry	Croke Park, Dublin
	M Sheridan 0–6, J Casey 0–4, J Horan 1–1, J Nallen 1–0, N Connolly 0–1, D Nestor 0–1.		M Fitzgerald 0–8, S Burke 1–0, E Breen 0–1, D Ó Cinnéide 0–1.	Attendance: 33,165; Referee: P Casserly (Westmeath)

18 August 1996 Semi-final	Meath	2–15 – 0–12	Tyrone	Croke Park, Dublin
	G Geraghty 1–4, B Callaghan 1–3, B Reilly 0–5, T Giles 0–3.		G Cavlan 0–6, A Cush 0–3, Peter Canavan 0–2, Pascal Canavan 0–1.	Attendance: 59,272; Referee: M Curley (Galway)

Finals

15 September 1996 Final	Meath	0–12 – 1–9	Mayo	Croke Park, Dublin
	T Giles 0–6, B Reilly 0–3, G Geraghty 0–1, C Coyle 0–1, J McDermott 0–1.		M Sheridan 0–4, R Dempsey 1–0, J Horan 0–3, C McManamon 0–1, PJ Loftus 0–1.	Attendance: 65,898; Referee: P McEneaney (Monaghan)

29 September 1996 Final replay	Meath	2–9 – 1–11	Mayo	Croke Park, Dublin
	T Giles 1–4, T Dowd 1–3, B Callaghan 0–1, B Reilly 0–1.		M Sheridan 0–5, J Horan 0–5, PJ Loftus 1–0, J Casey 0–1.	Attendance: 65,802; Referee: P McEneaney (Monaghan)

== Championship statistics ==
=== Top scorers ===
Overall

Rank	Player	County	Tally	Total	Matches	Average
1	Maurice Sheridan	Mayo	1–33	36	6	6.00
2	Trevor Giles	Meath	2–27	33	6	5.50
3	Peter Canavan	Tyrone	3–15	24	4	6.00
4	Anthony Keating	Carlow	1–19	23	3	7.66
5	Maurice Fitzgerald	Kerry	2–15	21	4	5.25
6	Dara Ó Cinnéide	Kerry	1–16	19	4	4.75
7	Shay Walsh	Galway	1–15	18	4	4.50
8	James Horan	Mayo	1–12	15	5	3.00
8	Joe Kavanagh	Cork	0–15	15	4	3.75
10	Niall Finnegan	Galway	1–11	14	4	3.50

Single game

Rank	Player	County	Tally	Total	Opposition
1	Dessie Barry	Longford	2–5	11	Wicklow
1	Anthony Keating	Carlow	1–8	11	Wexford
3	Peter Canavan	Tyrone	1–7	10	Fermanagh
4	Dara Ó Cinnéide	Kerry	1–6	9	Tipperary
4	Maurice Sheridan	Mayo	0–9	9	London
6	Maurice Fitzgerald	Kerry	2–2	8	Waterford
6	Willie Quinlan	Carlow	2–2	8	Wexford
6	Paul Taylor	Sligo	1–5	8	Galway
6	Peter Canavan	Tyrone	1–5	8	Derry
6	Leigh O'Brien	Wexford	0–8	8	Carlow
6	Shay Walsh	Galway	0–8	8	Sligo
6	Derek Duggan	Roscommon	0–8	8	Mayo
6	Maurice Fitzgerald	Kerry	0–8	8	Mayo

=== Miscellaneous ===
- On 12 May 1996, FitzGerald Park, Kilmallock hosts its first game for 24 years the Munster Quarter-final meeting of Cork vs Limerick.
- Louth recorded their first championship defeat of Offaly since 1964.
- Mayo defeated Galway in the Connacht final for the first time since 1969.
- Tyrone became the first team to retain the Ulster title since Derry in 1976.
- Meath–Tyrone All Ireland semi-final was the teams' first championship meeting.
- The All-Ireland final ends in a draw and goes to a replay for the first time since 1988.
