= David Nestor =

Irish Gaelic footballer

David Nestor (born 1 May 1974) is an Irish Gaelic footballer who plays for Kilmacud Crokes senior team. He previously played for Ballyhaunis and the Mayo county team and received a provincial medal from University College Dublin. In 1995, Nestor was named Mayo Sports Star of the Year.

== Competitions ==
Nestor has played in teams which won or were placed in a number of competitions:

- Connacht Under 16 winner 1989
- Connacht Minor runner-up 1991
- Connacht Under 21 winner 1994
- All-Ireland Under 21 runner-up 1994
- Connacht Under 21 winner 1995
- All-Ireland Junior winner 1995
- All-Ireland Under 21 runner-up 1995
