= Ollie Murphy =

Irish Gaelic footballer

Personal information
- Native name: Oilibhéar Ó Murchú (Irish)
- Born: Carnaross, County Meath, Ireland
- Height: 5 ft 10 in (178 cm)

Sport
- Sport: Gaelic football
- Position: Corner forward
Club
- Years: Club
- Carnaross
Inter-county
| Years | County | Apps (scores) |
| 1995–2006 | Meath | 40, 9–45 |
Inter-county titles
- Leinster titles: 3
- All-Irelands: 2
- All Stars: 2

Ollie Murphy is a Gaelic footballer who plays for the Carnaross club and the Meath county team. He came to national prominence in 1999 when he was one of Meath's best players as they won the All-Ireland Senior Football Championship that year, scoring the decisive goal in that year's All-Ireland final. This was his second All Ireland senior medal as he was a substitute when Meath won the 1996 All-Ireland Senior Football Championship. He also won three Leinster Senior Football Championship medals. Murphy won two GAA All Stars Awards. Murphy's best season was the 2001 championship where he put in a number of superb display's as Meath reached another All Ireland final. In that final he had to leave the field of play with a hand injury. In recent years his form has been not up to what it once was and he has failed to warrant a starting position. Ollie made his senior inter-county debut playing for London against Galway in the 1994 Connacht Senior Football Championship. It was his one and only appearance for the Exiles. Murphy's Benny father was also an inter-county player - he lined out for his native Fermanagh.
