= Maurice Fitzgerald (Gaelic footballer) =

Kerry Gaelic footballer (born 1969)

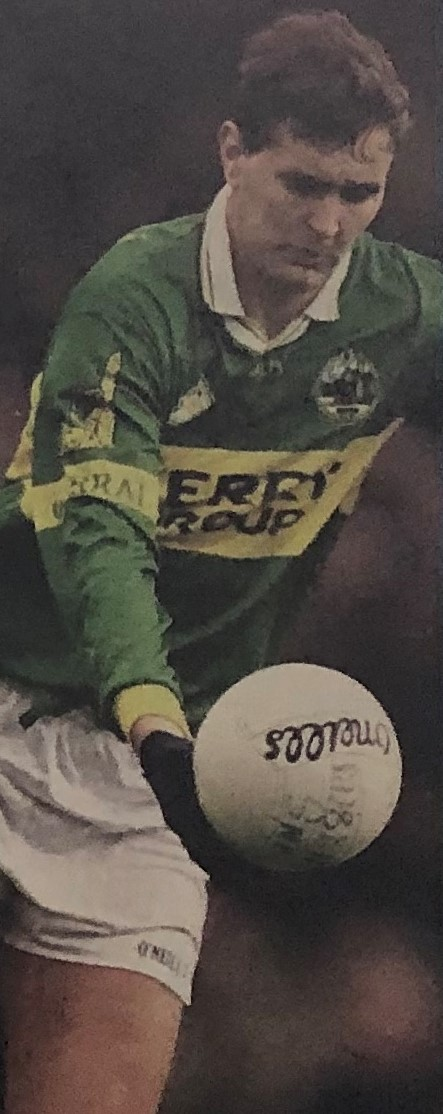

Personal information
- Native name: Muiris Mac Gearailt (Irish)
- Born: 1969 (age 56–57) Cahersiveen, County Kerry, Ireland
- Occupation: Secondary school principal
- Height: 6 ft 2 in (188 cm)

Sport
- Sport: Gaelic football
- Position: Left corner-forward
Club
- Years: Club
- 1986–2016: St Mary's
Club titles
- Kerry titles: 3
College
- Years: College
- University College Cork
College titles
- Sigerson titles: 1
Inter-county
Years	County	Apps (scores)
1988–2001	Kerry	58 (12–205)
Inter-county titles
- Munster titles: 6
- All-Irelands: 2
- NFL: 1
- All Stars: 3

Maurice Fitzgerald (born 1969) is an Irish Gaelic football selector and former player. His league and championship career at senior level with the Kerry county team spanned fourteen seasons from 1988 to 2001.

Born in Cahersiveen, County Kerry, Fitzgerald was born into a strong Gaelic football family. His father, Ned Fitzgerald, was an All-Ireland medal winner with Kerry in 1955 before later captaining the side in 1957. Fitzgerald's brother-in-law Colm O'Neill is a two-time All-Ireland medal winner with Cork, while his nephew, Shane O'Neill is a soccer player with Orlando City SC.

Fitzgerald played competitive Gaelic football during his schooling at Cahersiveen CBS and won several county championship medals in various grades. He later played with University College Cork, winning a Sigerson Cup medal in 1987. By this stage Fitzgerald had become a regular member of the St Mary's club team, beginning a four-decade association with the team. He won numerous South Kerry championship titles before claiming a county intermediate championship medal in 2001. With divisional side South Kerry he won three successive county senior championship medals from 2004 to 2006.

Fitzgerald made his debut on the inter-county scene at the age of sixteen when he was added to the Kerry minor team. He enjoyed two championship seasons with the minor team, however, he was a Munster runner-up on both occasions. Fitzgerald subsequently joined the Kerry under-21 team, winning an All-Ireland medal in his final year on the team in 1990. By this stage he had also joined the Kerry senior team, making his debut during the 1987-88 league. Over the course of the next fourteen seasons, Fitzgerald won two All-Ireland medals in 1997 and 2000. He also won six Munster medals and one National Football League medal. He played his last game for Kerry in August 2001.

After being chosen on the Munster inter-provincial team for the first time in 1988, Fitzgerald was an automatic choice on the starting fifteen on a number of occasions. He ended his career without a Railway Cup medal.

During his career, Fitzgerald won three All Star awards, was named Footballer of the Year in 1997 and was selected on a list of the 125 greatest Gaelic footballers of all time in a 2009 poll. After scoring 12-205, Fitzgerald is the all-time third highest scorer for Kerry. He is also the all-time top scorer in the Munster Championship.

In retirement from playing Fitzgerald became involved in team management and coaching. He is heavily involved as a coach with the Coláiste na Sceilge senior team, while at club level he has served as manager of the St Mary's team, guiding them to an All-Ireland title in 2016. Later that year Fitzgerald became a selector with the Kerry senior team.

== Biography ==
Fitzgerald was born near Cahersiveen, County Kerry in 1969. He was born into a family that had a strong link to football in Kerry. His father Ned was a Kerry footballer of note back in the late 1950s while his uncle, Séamus O’Connor, is the holder of a record ten South Kerry Senior Football Championship medals.

Fitzgerald was educated at the local national school and later attended Cahersiveen CBS. It was here that his football talents were further developed and he won numerous county medals. Fitzgerald later studied at University College, Cork, however, he also became a key member of the UCC football team. In 1988 he won a Sigerson Cup medal following an 0–8 to 0–5 defeat of University College, Galway in the inter-varsities series of games.

As of 2009, Fitzgerald was working as a property auctioneer with Fitzgerald & O'Connor Ltd's Auctioneering firm, a family-run business established in 1979. He is the uncle of Shane O'Neill.

In 2018 Fitzgerald was appointed principal of Coláiste na Sceilge in Caherciveen.

== Playing career ==
=== Club ===
Fitzgerald played club football with his local club called St Mary's in Cahersiveen; however, it is with divisional side South Kerry that he had his greatest successes at club level.

In 2004 South Kerry qualified for the final of the county football championship for the first time in twenty years. Laune Rangers provided the opposition; however, the divisional side never looked troubled at any stage of the match. At the full-time whistle victory went to South Kerry by 1–13 to 2–5 and Fitzgerald added a county winners' medal to his collection.

The following year South Kerry continued their domination of club football and reached the final of the county championship for the second year in succession. On this occasion Killarney-based club Dr Crokes provided the opposition. A close game developed; however, Fitzgerald's side were to the fore once again. A 0–12 to 1–6 victory resulted in a second consecutive club winners' medal for Fitzgerald. He also picked up the man-of-the-match award.

In 2006, for the third year in succession, the South Kerry team reached the final of the club championship. Dr Crokes provided the opposition for the second time in-a-row. In a low-scoring contest South Kerry retained their title giving Fitzgerald a third consecutive county winners' medal. The game was not without incident. Fitzgerald was involved in an accidental clash with his captain Paul O'Connor, and worried supporters saw him lay still for over eight minutes before being stretchered from the field. He was immediately transferred to Kerry General Hospital, and it was later reported that he had been concussed.

In 2007 South Kerry set out on the four-in-a-row trail. All went to plan as Fitzgerald's side reached a fourth county championship final in succession. Feale Rangers provided the opposition. A low-scoring game followed; however, Fitzgerald's side narrowly lost out by 1–4 to 0–6.

=== Senior ===
By this stage Fitzgerald had joined the Kerry senior football team. He made his senior championship debut in a provincial game against Waterford in 1988. It was a difficult time for Kerry as the team was adjusting to the decline of the team of the 1970s and 1980s, a team regarded by many as the greatest of all-time. In Fitzgerald's debut season Kerry reached the provincial decider and faced reigning Munster title-holders Cork. The game proved to be a close affair, however, a goal for ‘the Rebels’ proved the key in securing a 1-14 to 0-16 victory. Fitzgerald's performances in the provincial championship saw him pick up an All Star award.

In 1989 Fitzgerald lined out in his second Munster final. Once again it was near neighbours Cork who provided the opposition. On this occasion ‘the Rebels’ had a more emphatic victory as Fitzgerald's side lost out by 1–12 to 1–9.

1990 saw Kerry face Cork in the Munster final for the twenty-fifth successive year. It was Fitzgerald's third provincial decider in succession. However, ‘the Rebels’ recorded a surprise 2–23 to 1–11 victory. It was ‘the Kingdom’s’ biggest ever defeat by Cork.

The following year Kerry regrouped and Fitzgerald lined out in a fourth successive Munster final. Limerick broke the provincial duopoly and provided the opposition in the county's first Munster final since 1965. Kerry's point-scoring ability was just enough to counteract Limerick's goal-scoring prowess. A 0–23 to 3–12 victory gave Fitzgerald his first Munster winners' medal in the senior grade. This proved to be the highlight of the year as Kerry were defeated by eventual champions Down in the subsequent All-Ireland semi-final.

In 1992 Kerry reached the Munster final for the thirty-fifth year in-a-row. The traditional provincial duopoly remained broken as minnows Clare provided the opposition. Kerry were the red-hot favourites. However Clare emerged victorious by 2–10 to 0–12.

Kerry continued with their decline over the next few years when the team failed to even reach the provincial decider. In 1995 Fitzgerald lined out in his sixth Munster final; however, he had only been successful on one occasion. It was a ‘traditional’ final as Cork provided the opposition. ‘The Rebels’, however, had too much firepower for ‘the Kingdom’, and Fitzgerald's side lost out by 0–15 to 1–9.

In 1996 Kerry regrouped under new manager Páidí Ó Sé and Fitzgerald lined out in his seventh provincial decider. Cork provided the opposition once again; however, on this occasion Kerry were a different team. A 0–14 to 0–11 victory gave Fitzgerald his second Munster winners’ medal in the senior grade and kick-started the Kerry football revival. Kerry's next assignment was an All-Ireland semi-final meeting with Mayo. In spite of claiming the provincial title, Kerry were still not the finished article. Fitzgerald's side were eventually defeated by 2–13 to 1–10. In spite of falling short again Fitzgerald was later presented with a second All Star award.

1997 saw Kerry throw down an early marker with regard to their All-Ireland ambitions. The team reached the final of the National Football League that year with Cork providing the opposition in Páirc Uí Chaoimh. A 3–7 to 1–8 victory gave Fitzgerald a winners' medal in the inter-county game's secondary competition. Later that summer Kerry reached the Munster final once again. Clare provided the opposition on this occasion; however, in spite of shocking the Kerry men five years earlier, there was no shock this time. A 1–13 to 0–11 victory saw Fitzgerald add a third Munster winners' medal to his collection. A subsequent defeat of Cavan saw Kerry qualify for their first All-Ireland final in eleven years. Mayo, the defeated finalists of the previous year, provided the opposition. Mayo went on a scoring spree during the match, capturing 1–2 inside two minutes. Fitzgerald was the star player for Kerry. He scored nine points throughout the game while Mayo froze and were held scoreless for the last twenty minutes. A 0–13 to 1–7 score line gave Kerry the title and gave Fitzgerald an All-Ireland winners’ medal. His performances throughout the championship and in the so-called ‘Maurice Fitzgerald final’ earned him a third All Star award.

Kerry continued their march again in 1998 with a Munster final showdown with Tipperary. For the third year in succession ‘the Kingdom’ proved the provincial masters, and a 0–17 to 1–10 win gave Fitzgerald a fourth Munster title. Kerry were the favourites to retain their All-Ireland title; however, a narrow 0–13 to 1–9 defeat by Kildare in the All-Ireland semi-final brought an end to their All-Ireland quest.

In 1999 Kerry were attempting to secure a fourth provincial title in succession. Cork put an end to this dream with a 2–10 to 2–4 win over their great rivals in the Munster final. With that Kerry were dumped out of the championship.

After a low point the previous year, Kerry were back in the provincial decider again in 2000. By this stage Fitzgerald was relegated to the substitutes' bench and was used more as an impact sub. That year he lined out in yet another Munster final, his third with Clare as opposition. Kerry walloped ‘the Banner men’ by 3–15 to 0–8. It was Fitzgerald's fifth Munster medal. Kerry had firmly established their All-Ireland contender credentials, however, the All-Ireland series proved difficult. Fitzgerald's side drew with Armagh in the semi-final, while the replay proved just as tense. Both sides finished level after seventy minutes once again and it took a period of extra-time to find a winner. Kerry won narrowly 2–15 to 1–15 and booked a place in the Millennium All-Ireland final against Galway, who were playing their second final in three years. In a game to forget both sides missed easy chances and seemed apprehensive about taking a lead. Galway trailed by seven points at one stage, but clawed their way back to secure a 0–14 apiece draw. The replay was a much more conclusive affair. Galway worked the ball the length of the field to Declan Meehan who scored a goal to give the westerners a boost. A disputed free with seventeen minutes left in the game gave Kerry a lead which they would not relinquish. At the full-time whistle Kerry were the champions by 0–17 to 1–10. It was Fitzgerald's second All-Ireland winners' medal.

After some early season rumblings of disquiet between Fitzgerald and the Kerry management, Kerry swept through the provincial series with ease again in 2001. A 0–19 to 1–13 defeat of Cork gave Fitzgerald a sixth Munster winners’ medal and gave Kerry a boost in their All-Ireland ambitions. In a new innovation called the All-Ireland qualifiers series, Kerry's provincial victory allowed them to advance to the All-Ireland quarter-final against Dublin. Kerry were cruising but had lost their concentration and had allowed ‘the Dubs’ to lead in the last minute. A poor kick-out resulted in a line-ball being awarded to Kerry on the 45-metre line. With Dublin manager Tommy Carr shouting in his ear and the deafening roar of the crowd, Fitzgerald, with his first touch of the ball — he had only been introduced a few minutes earlier —, kicked the ball with the outside of his boot on his bad side over the bar to level the match and force a replay. This point was listed as one of RTÉ's Top 20 GAA Moments in a 2005 poll. Kerry won the replay at Semple Stadium giving Fitzgerald's side the right to advance to an All-Ireland semi-final showdown with Meath. In one of the lowest points ever for Kerry football, ‘the Kingdom’ were demolished by ‘the Royals’ on a score line of 2–14 to 0–5.

This defeat proved too much for some and Fitzgerald, tired of being confined to the bench, retired from inter-county football. In spite of this he was asked to return to the Kerry panel in 2004 at the age of 35. However, he declined Jack O'Connor's invitation.

=== Inter-provincial ===
Fitzgerald also lined out with his province in the inter-provincial series of games; however, he enjoyed little success. In 1989 he was listed among the substitutes when Munster faced Ulster in the final of the competition. That game was played at Páirc Uí Chaoimh and a close encounter developed. Fitzgerald entered the game as a substitute; however, Munster were defeated by 1–11 to 1–8.

A lack of success for Kerry meant that it was 1994 before Fitzgerald played in his second Railway Cup final. Ulster provided the opposition once again, however, victory went to the northerners by 1–6 to 1–4.

== Honours ==
=== Player ===
St. Mary's

- Kerry Intermediate Football Championship (1): 2001
- South Kerry Senior Football Championship (9) 1985,1991, 1992, 1995, 2001, 2002, 2003, 2009,2010,

South Kerry

- Kerry Senior Football Championship (3): 2004 (c), 2005, 2006

University College Cork

- Sigerson Cup (1): 1988

Kerry

- All-Ireland Senior Football Championship (2): 1997, 2000
- Munster Senior Football Championship (6): 1991, 1996, 1997, 1998, 2000, 2001
- National Football League (1): 1996-97
- All-Ireland Under-21 Football Championship (1): 1990
- Munster Under-21 Football Championship (1): 1990

=== Individual ===
Awards

- Texaco Footballer of the Year (1): 1997
- All Stars Footballer of the Year (1): 1997
- All Star Awards (3): 1988, 1996, 1997
- In May 2020, a public poll conducted by RTÉ.ie named Fitzgerald in the full-forward line alongside Michael Murphy and Colm Cooper in a team of footballers who had won All Stars during the era of The Sunday Game.
- Also in May 2020, the Irish Independent named Fitzgerald at number twelve in its "Top 20 footballers in Ireland over the past 50 years".

=== Manager ===
St Mary's

- All-Ireland Intermediate Club Football Championship (1): 2016
- Munster Intermediate Club Football Championship (1): 2015
- Kerry Intermediate Football Championship (1): 2015

Achievements
Preceded by Pat O'Drsicoll	All-Ireland Intermediate Club Football Final winning Manager; 2016	Succeeded by Incumbent
Awards
Preceded by Martin O'Connell	Texaco Footballer of the Year; 1997	Succeeded by Michael Donnellan
Preceded by Trevor Giles	All Stars Footballer of the Year; 1997	Succeeded by Jarlath Fallon
