= 1997 All-Ireland Senior Football Championship =

Football championship

Championship details
- Dates: 11 May 1997 – 28 September 1997
- Teams: 32

All-Ireland Champions
- Winning team: Kerry (31st win)
- Captain: Liam Hassett
- Manager: Páidí Ó Sé

All-Ireland Finalists
- Losing team: Mayo
- Captain: Noel Connelly
- Manager: John Maughan

Provincial Champions
- Munster: Kerry
- Leinster: Offaly
- Ulster: Cavan
- Connacht: Mayo

Championship statistics
- No. matches played: 37
- Top Scorer: Maurice Fitzgerald (0–28)
- Player of the Year: Maurice Fitzgerald

The 1997 Bank of Ireland All-Ireland Senior Football Championship was the 111th staging of the All-Ireland Senior Football Championship, the Gaelic Athletic Association's premier inter-county Gaelic football tournament. The championship began on 11 May 1997 and ended on 28 September 1997.

Meath entered the championship as the defending champions; however, they were defeated by Offaly in the Leinster final.

On 28 September 1997 Kerry, the most successful county in Gaelic football history, claimed their 31st All-Ireland title – and their first since 1986 – with a 0–13 to 1–7 victory over Mayo.

This year also saw Ulster's most successful county, Cavan, win their first provincial title since 1969.

== Munster Championship format change ==
A new 2 year system was introduced in Munster meaning that Kerry, Cork & Clare would have straight access to the Munster semi-finals for Limerick, Tipperary & Waterford would play in a Preliminary Round and the bye team in a lone Quarter final involved.

== Fixtures and results ==
=== Munster Senior Football Championship ===
Preliminary round

11 May 1997 Preliminary round	Limerick	1–13 – 0–16	Tipperary	Gaelic Grounds, Limerick
	D Ryan 0–5, J Quane 1–1, M Galvin 0–3, Damien Reidy 0–2, D Fitzgibbon 0–1, N Frewen 0–1.		D Browne 0–7, P Lambert 0–4, D Foley 0–3, S Owens 0–1, B Burke 0–1.	Referee: N Barrett (Cork)

18 May 1997 Preliminary round replay	Tipperary	1–17 – 2–8	Limerick	Ned Hall Park, Clonmel
	B Cummins 0–8, J Owens 1–1, D Browne 0–2, D Foley 0–2, B Burke 0–1, M Sheehan 0–1, J Williams 0–1, S Maher 0–1.		Damien Reidy 1–1, J Quane 1–0, P Galvin 0–3, I Walsh 0–2, D Rayn 0–1, N frewen 0–1.	Referee: N Barrett (Cork)

Quarter-final

1 June 1997 Quarter-final	Waterford	1–5 – 2–7	Tipperary	Fraher Field, Dungarvan
	G Keane 1–2, O Costelloe 0–2, S Bergin 0–1.		B Cummins 1–2, D Foley 1–0, M Sheehan 0–1, B Burke 0–1, J Williams 0–1, J Owens 0–1, D O'Connor 0–1.	Referee: W O'Mahony (Limerick)

Semi-finals

22 June 1997 Semi-final	Clare	1–14 – 1–13	Cork	Cusack Park, Ennis
	G Keane 0–8, M Daly 1–3, M Hynes 0–1, B Keating 0–1, C Shannon 0–1.		C Corkery 0–4, S O'Brien 1–0, F Collins 0–3, A Dorgan 0–2, J Kavanagh 0–2, B Corcoran 0–1, B Murphy 0–1.	Referee: M Curley (Galway)

29 June 1997 Semi-final	Kerry	2–12 – 1–10	Tipperary	Austin Stack Park, Tralee
	M Fitzgerald 0–7, J Crowley 1–1, D O'Dwyer 1–0, L Hassett 0–2, D Ó Sé 0–1, K Burns 0–1.		D Browne 1–1, B Cummins 0–3, D Foley 0–2, S Maher 0–1, B Burke 0–1, D Lyons 0–1, M Sheehan 0–1.	Referee: K Walsh (Clare)

Final

20 July 1997 Final	Kerry	1–13 – 0–11	Clare	Gaelic Grounds, Limerick
	P Laide 1–2, M Fitzgerald 0–5, D Ó Cinnéide 0–2, D Dwyer 0–1, B Clarke 0–1, MF Russell 0–1, J Crowley 0–1.		M Daly 0–5, G Keane 0–4, F Lohan 0–1, J Enright 0–1.	Referee: N Barrett (Cork)

Preliminary Round
Limerick	1–13; 2-08
Tipperary	0–16; 1–17

Quarter-final
Tipperary	2-7
Waterford	1-5

Semi-finals
Kerry	2-12
Tipperary	1–10
Clare	2–13
Cork	1–14

Final
Kerry	1–13
Clare	0–11

=== Leinster Senior Football Championship ===
First round

11 May 1997 First round	Wexford	2–5 – 0–11	Westmeath	O'Kennedy Park, New Ross
	J Lawlor 1–1, M Mahon 1–0, L O'Brien 0–3, B Kirwan 0–1.		K Lyons 0–3, M Flanagan 0–3, T Cleary 0–3, O Keating 0–1, G Heavin 0–1.	Attendance: 2,000; Referee: S McCormack (Meath)

11 May 1997 First round	Offaly	5–17 – 0–13	Longford	O'Connor Park, Tullamore
	A Kelly 1–3, R Malone 1–2, C McManus 1–2, V Claffey 1–1, C Quinn 1–0, P Brady 0–3, F Cullen 0–2, S Grennan 0–1, R Mooney 0–1, J Grennan 0–1, V Mooney 0–1.		D Barr 0–6, E Barden 0–3, E McCormack 0–3, T Smullen 0–1.	Attendance: 18,000; Referee: A Walsh (Dublin)

17 May 1997 First round replay	Westmeath	2–17 – 1–15	Wexford	Cusack Park, Mullingar
	M Staunton 1–2, T Cleary 0–4, P Conway 1–0, G Heavin 0–3, S Colleary 0–2, M Treanor 0–2, J Murray 0–2, M Flanagan 0–1, J Cooney 0–1.		J Byrne 0–8, S Dolan 1–1, Lawlor 0–4, Doran 0–1, Guinan 0–1.

Second round

25 May 1997 Second round	Offaly	0–8 – 0–8	Westmeath	O'Connor Park, Tullamore
	V Claffey 0–4, P Brady 0–2, R Mooney 0–1, C McManus 0–1.		T Cleary 0–7, J Cooney 0–1.	Attendance: 11,000; Referee: P O'Toole (Longford)

7 June 1997 Second round replay	Westmeath	0–7 – 1–14	Offaly	Cusack Park, Mullingar
	T Cleary 0–5, P Conway 0–1, G Heavin 0–1.		D Reynolds 0–6, P Brady 1–2, V Claffey 0–2, C McManus 0–1, J Kenny 0–1, R Mooney 0–1, M Daly 0–1.	Attendance: 11,000; Referee: P O'Toole (Longford)

Quarter-finals

1 June 1997 Quarter-final	Louth	1–13 – 1–10	Carlow	St. Conleth's Park, Newbridge
	C Kelly 0–6, C O'Hanlon 1–0, A Rooney 0–2, A Hoey 0–2, O McDonnell 0–1, R Rooney 0–1, S O'Hanlon 0–1.		A Keating 0–5, W Quinlan 1–0, P Nolan 0–2, J Nevin 0–2, S Kavanagh 0–1.	Attendance: 8,000; Referee: J Bannon (Longford)

8 June 1997 Quarter-final	Laois	1–7 – 1–11	Kildare	Croke Park, Dublin
	T Bowe 1–1, I Fitzgerald 0–3, T Maher 0–1, D Sweeney 0–1, L Turley 0–1.		P Graven 0–8, G Ryan 1–2, N Buckley 0–1.	Attendance: 25,211; Referee: P Casserly (Westmeath)

15 June 1997 Quarter-final	Offaly	1–17 – 1–8	Wicklow	Croke Park, Dublin
	D Reynolds 0–7, P Brady 1–3, S Grennan 0–3, V Claffey 0–2, C McManus 0–1, M Daly 0–1.		K O'Brien 1–0, C Daye 0–3, D McMahon 0–2, J Behan 0–1, S Miley 0–1, S O'Neill 0–1.	Attendance: 62,342; Referee: P McGann

15 June 1997 Quarter-final	Meath	1–13 – 1–10	Dublin	Croke Park, Dublin
	O Murphy 1–1, T Giles 0–3, J McDermott 0–2, T Dowd 0–2, B Reilly 0–2, J McGuinness 0–1, G Geraghty 0–1, E Kelly 0–1.		C Redmond 0–4, K Barr 1–0, B Stynes 0–2, P Curran 0–1, E Heery 0–1, J Gavin 0–1, P Ward 0–1.	Attendance: 62,342; Referee: B White (Wexford)

Semi-finals

29 June 1997 Semi-final	Offaly	1–10 – 0–11	Louth	Páirc Tailteann, Navan
	D Reynolds 0–7, S Grennan 1–0, R Malone 0–2, V Claffey 0–1.		C O'Hanlon 0–3, C Kelly 0–2, O McDonnell 0–2, S White 0–2, B Kerin 0–1, S Melia 0–1.	Attendance: 18,000; Referee: J Bannon (Longford)

6 July 1997 Semi-final	Kildare	1–9 – 0–12	Meath	Croke Park, Dublin
	M Lynch 1–0, P Graven 0–3, D Kerrigan 0–2, W McCreery 0–1, N Buckley 0–1, E McCormack 0–1, A Rainbow 0–1.		T Giles 0–4, G Geraghty 0–3, J McGuinness 0–2, T Dowd 0–1, B Reilly 0–1, O Murphy 0–1.	Attendance: 46,595; Referee: C Buckley (Offaly)

20 July 1997 Semi-final replay	Kildare	3–17 – 2–20 (aet)	Meath	Croke Park, Dublin
	P Graven 0–6, P McCormack 0–4, N Buckley 0–4, T Harris 1–0, B Murphy 1–0, W McCreery 1–0, M Lynch 0–1, D Earley 0–1, P McCormack 0–1.		T Giles 2–8, J Devine 0–4, B Reilly 0–3, T Dowd 0–2, O Murphy 0–2, G Geraghty 0–1.	Attendance: 54,290; Referee: P O'Toole (Longford)

3 August 1997 Semi-final second replay	Meath	1–12 – 1–10	Kildare	Croke Park, Dublin
	O Murphy 1–4, B Reilly 0–2, T Giles 0–2, J McDermott 0–1, C Coyle 0–1, J McGuinness 0–1, T Dowd 0–1.		N Buckley 0–5, D Kerrigan 1–0, P Graven 0–3, M Lynch 0–1, E McCormack 0–1.	Attendance: 55,572; Referee: P O'Toole (Longford)

Final

16 August 1997 Final	Offaly	3–17 – 1–15	Meath	Croke Park, Dublin
	V Claffey 1–5, R Malone 2–0, C Cunn 0–4, P Brady 0–3, D Reynolds 0–3, C McManus 0–1, R Mooney 0–1.		B Reilly 0–7, J McGuinness 1–2, O Murphy 0–3, T Giles 0–3.	Attendance: 46,047; Referee: B White (Wexford)

2nd Round
Offaly	0–08; 1–14
Westmeath	0–08; 0-07

Quarter-finals
Offaly	1–17
Wicklow	1–08
Louth	1–13
Carlow	1–10
Laois	1–07
Kildare	1–11
Meath	1–13
Dublin	1–10

Semi-finals
Offaly	1–10
Louth	0–11
Meath	0–12; 2–20; 1–12
Kildare	1–09; 3–17; 1–10

Final
Offaly	3–17
Meath	1–15

=== Connacht Senior Football Championship ===
Quarter-finals

25 May 1997 Quarter-final	Galway	0–15 – 1–16	Mayo	Tuam Stadium, Tuam
	N Finnegan 0–9, J Donnellan 0–3, S Óg de Paor 0–1, D Meehan 0–1, V Daly 0–1.		M Sheridan 0–8, PJ Loftus 1–0, D Nestor 0–2, L McHale 0–2, K McDonald 0–2, P Fallon 0–1, J Casey 0–1.	Attendance: 18,500

1 June 1997 Quarter-final	London	1–13 – 2–18 (aet)	Leitrim	Emerald GAA Grounds, Ruislip
	P Hehir 0–6, T Maguire 0–5, F Hussey 1–0, S Hehir 0–2.		D Darcy 2–11, F McBrien 0–3, P McLoughlin 0–2, G Flanagan 0–1, B Guckian 0–1.

Semi-finals

23 June 1997 Semi-final	Sligo	1–14 – 1–11	Roscommon	Markievicz Park, Sligo
	P Taylor 0–8, D Sloyane 1–2, P Neary 0–3, E O'Hara 0–1.		T Ryan 1–1, L Dolan 0–4, N Dinneen 0–2, D Duggan 0–1, A Nolan 0–1, T Connellan 0–1, N O'Donoghue 0–1.

29 June 1997 Semi-final	Mayo	0–18 – 0–11	Leitrim	MacHale Park, Castlebar
	M Sheridan 0–7, K McDonald 0–4, D Byrne 0–2, P Holmes 0–1, K Mortimer 0–1, J Horan 0–1, J Casey 0–1, PJ Loftus 0–1.		D Darcy 0–8, K McLoughlin 0–1, A Cullen 0–1, F McBrien 0–1.

Final

3 August 1997 Final	Mayo	0–11 – 1–7	Sligo	Dr. Hyde Park, Roscommon
	M Sheridan 0–6, C McDonald 0–2, J Horan 0–1, D Nestor 0–1, R Golding 0–1.		B Walsh 1–1, P Taylor 0–3, D Sloynane 0–1, K Killeen 0–1, P Durcan 0–1.	Attendance: 22,000; Referee: M Curley (Galway)

Quarter-finals
Mayo	1–16
Galway	0–15
Leitrim	2–18
London	1–13

Semi-finals
Mayo	0–18
Leitrim	0–11
Roscommon	1–11
Sligo	1–14

Final
Mayo	0–11
Sligo	1–07

=== Ulster Senior Football Championship ===
Preliminary round

18 May 1997 Preliminary round	Down	2–9 – 0–15	Tyrone	St. Tiernach's Park, Clones
	J Treanor 0–5, G Mason 1–1, G Deegan 1–1, M Linden 0–2.		A Cush 0–5, Peter Canavan 0–4, S Lawn 0–2, N Donnelly 0–1, C McBride 0–1, B Dooher 0–1.	Referee: M McGrath (Donegal)

25 May 1997 Preliminary round replay	Down	1–11 – 3–8	Tyrone	St. Tiernach's Park, Clones
	C McCabe 1–1, J Treanor 0–4, M Linden 0–3, C Deegan 0–1, G Deegan 0–1, F Caulfield 0–1.		A Cush 0–5, Peter Canavan 1–1, S Lawn 1–0, M McGleenan 1–0, S McCallan 0–1, E Kilpatrick 0–1.	Attendance: 24,622; Referee: M McGrath (Donegal)

Quarter-finals

25 May 1997 Quarter-final	Donegal	2–12 – 1–13	Antrim	MacCumhaill Park, Ballybofey
	B Murray 1–1, T Boyle 1–1, M Boyle 0–4, N Hegarty 0–2, D Bonner 0–2, B McGowan 0–1, B McLaughlin 0–1.		K Madden 1–2, P Derby 0–3, F Wilson 0–2, J Wilson 0–2, P McCann 0–2, M Mulholland 0–1, D Smyth 0–1.	Attendance: 10,000

1 June 1997 Quarter-final	Monaghan	2–8 – 1–11	Derry	St. Tiernach's Park, Clones
	S McGinnity 0–5, P Duffy 1–1, N Marron 1–0, D McArdle 0–1, D McKiernan 0–1.		J Brolly 1–3, J Cassidy 0–3, A Tohill 0–2, F McCusker 0–1.	Attendance: 10,340; Referee: M McBrien (Fermanagh)

8 June 1997 Quarter-final replay	Derry	2–15 – 0–10	Monaghan	Celtic Park, Derry
	J Brolly 1–4, D Dougan 1–0, S Downey 0–3, J Cassidy 0–2, F McCusker 0–2, D Heaney 0–1, R Rocks 0–1, SM Lockhart 0–1, K McKeever 0–1.		D Smith 0–5, D McKiernan 0–2, P Duffy 0–2, N Marron 0–1.	Attendance: 10,500; Referee: M McBrien (Fermanagh)

8 June 1997 Quarter-final	Cavan	1–12 – 1–12	Fermanagh	St. Tiernach's Park, Clones
	P Reilly 0–5, D McCabe 1–1, R Cunningham 0–3, M Graham 0–2, A Forde 0–1.		R Gallagher 1–7, L McBarron 0–2, S King 0–1, C Curran 0–1, K Donnelly 0–1.	Attendance: 14,783; Referee: J Curran (County Tyrone)

15 June 1997 Quarter-final	Tyrone	1–12 – 0–12	Armagh	Healy Park, Omagh
	M McGleenan 1–2, Peter Canavan 0–5, A Cush 0–2, G Cavlan 0–1, B Dooher 0–1, C McBride 0–1.		O McConville 0–8, M Toye 0–1, G Houlahan 0–1, K McGeeney 0–1, J Rafferty 0–1.	Attendance: 22,000; Referee: P McEneaney (Monaghan)

15 June 1997 Quarter-final replay	Cavan	0–14 – 0–11	Fermanagh	St. Tiernach's Park, Clones
	P Reilly 0–3, F Cahill 0–3, M Graham 0–2, A Forde 0–1, C Brady 0–1, D Brady 0–1, R Carolan 0–1, J Reilly 0–1.		R Gallagher 0–5, S King 0–3, C Curran 0–2, M Gallagher 0–1.	Attendance: 17,752; Referee: J Curran (County Tyrone)

Semi-finals

22 June 1997 Semi-final	Cavan	2–16 – 2–10	Donegal	St. Tiernach's Park, Clones
	R Carolan 1–7, P Reilly 1–2, L Reilly 0–4, S King 0–1, D Reilly 0–1, R Cunningham 0–1.		T Boyle 1–1, M Boyle 0–4, B McLaughlin 1–0, B Roper 0–2, D Bonner 0–2, N Hegarty 0–1.	Attendance: 20,493; Referee: J Curran (County Tyrone)

29 June 1997 Semi-final	Tyrone	2–3 – 2–15	Derry	St. Tiernach's Park, Clones
	N Donnelly 1–0, M McGleenan 1–0, Peter Canavan 0–2, A Cush 0–1.		J Brolly 1–4, J Cassidy 0–4, S Downey 1–0, G Coleman 0–2, A Tohill 0–2, SM Lockhart 0–1, D Heaney 0–1, F McCusker 0–1.	Attendance: 25,271; Referee: P McEneaney (Monaghan)

Final

20 July 1997 Final	Cavan	1–14 – 0–16	Derry	St. Tiernach's Park, Clones
	R Carolan 0–6, J O'Reilly 1–0, P Reilly 0–3, L Reilly 0–2, F Cahill 0–1, R Cunningham 0–1, D McCabe 0–1.		A Tohill 0–4, J Brolly 0–3, G Coleman 0–2, G McGill 0–2, J Cassidy 0–1, J McBride 0–1, F McCusker 0–1, K McKeever 0–1, D Dougan 0–1.	Attendance: 34,349; Referee: P McEneaney (Monaghan)

Preliminary Round
Down	2–09; 0–11
Tyrone	0–15; 3-08

Quarter-finals
Cavan	1–12; 0–14
Fermanagh	1–12; 0–11
Donegal	2–12
Antrim	1–13
Monaghan	2–08; 0–10
Derry	1–11; 2–15
Tyrone	1–12
Armagh	0–12

Semi-finals
Cavan	2–16
Donegal	2–10
Tyrone	2–03
Derry	2–15

Final
Cavan	1–14
Derry	0–16

=== All-Ireland Senior Football Championship ===
Semi-finals

24 August 1997 Semi-final	Cavan	1–10 – 1–17	Kerry	Croke Park, Dublin
	F Cahill 1–1, R Carolan 0–4, D McCabe 0–2, P Reilly 0–1, L Reilly 0–1, D O'Reilly 0–1.		M Fitzgerald 0–7, MF Russell 1–1, Billy O'Shea 0–2, E Breen 0–1, D Ó Sé 0–1, P Laide 0–1, L Hassett 0–1, D O'Dwyer 0–1, D Ó Cinnéide 0–1, B Clarke 0–1.	Attendance: 60,072; Referee: P Casserly (Westmeath)

31 August 1997 Semi-final	Mayo	0–13 – 0–7	Offaly	Croke Park, Dublin
	M Sheridan 0–4, K McDonald 0–3, D Nestor 0–2, F Costello 0–1, L McHale 0–1, K O'Neill 0–1, P Fallon 0–1.		D Reynolds 0–4, C Quinn 0–1, P Brady 0–1, J Grennan 0–1.	Attendance: 56,369; Referee: P Russell (Tipperary)

Final

28 September 1997 Final	Kerry	0–13 – 1–7	Mayo	Croke Park, Dublin
	M Fitzgerald 0–9, P Laide 0–2, D Ó Sé 0–1, J Crowley 0–1.		C McDonald 1–1, M Sheridan 0–3, J Horan 0–2, C McManamon 0–1.	Attendance: 65,601; Referee: B White (Wexford)

== Championship statistics ==
=== Top scorers ===
Overall

Rank	Player	County	Tally	Total	Matches	Average
1	Maurice Fitzgerald	Kerry	0–28	28	4	7.00
2	Maurice Sheridan	Mayo	0–27	27	5	5.20
2	David Reynolds	Offaly	0–27	27	5	5.20
4	Declan Darcy	Leitrim	2–19	25	2	12.50
5	Trevor Giles	Meath	2–18	24	5	4.80
6	Joe Brolly	Derry	3–14	23	4	5.75
7	Vinny Claffey	Offaly	2–15	21	7	3.00
7	Ronan Carolan	Cavan	1–18	21	5	4.25
9	Peter Brady	Offaly	2–14	20	7	2.83
9	Pádraig Graven	Kildare	0–20	20	4	5.00

Single game

Rank	Player	County	Tally	Total	Opposition
1	Declan Darcy	Leitrim	2–11	17	London
2	Trevor Giles	Meath	2–8	14	Kildare
3	Raymond Gallagher	Fermanagh	1–7	10	Cavan
3	Ronan Carolan	Cavan	1–7	10	Fermanagh
5	Niall Finnegan	Galway	0–9	9	Mayo
5	Maurice Fitzgerald	Kerry	0–9	9	Mayo
7	Vinny Claffey	Offaly	1–5	8	Meath
7	Brendan Cummins	Tipperary	0–8	8	Limerick
7	Ger Keane	Clare	0–8	8	Cork
7	Jim Byrne	Wexford	0–8	8	Westmeath
7	Pádraig Graven	Kildare	0–8	8	Laois
7	Maurice Sheridan	Mayo	0–8	8	Galway
7	Paul Taylor	Sligo	0–8	8	Roscommon
7	Declan Darcy	Leitrim	0–8	8	Mayo
7	Oisín McConville	Armagh	0–8	8	Tyrone

=== Miscellaneous ===
- On 11 May 1997, O'Kennedy Park, New Ross hosted its 1st game for 53 years it was the drawn game between Wexford vs Westmeath.
- Clare record their first win over Cork since 1941.
- Cavan win their first Ulster title since 1969 and last until 2020.
- Offaly won their first Leinster title since 1982.
- All Ireland semi-final Mayo vs Offaly was the first championship meeting between them.
- Kerry end their longest drought as All Ireland Champions of 11 years.
