= 2026 Louth Senior Hurling Championship =

- Dates: 9 July - 9 August, 2026
- Teams: 3
- Champions: St. Fechins (7th title)
- Runners-up: Naomh Moninne

The 2026 Louth Senior Hurling Championship is the 71st staging of the Louth Senior Hurling Championship since its establishment by the Louth County Board.

Three teams contested the Louth Senior Hurling Championship. All three teams entered the round-robin stage stage, playing each other in home or away fixtures, guaranteeing at least two championship games. The top two teams after three rounds play in a lone final.

Naomh Moninne entered the championship as defending champions. Knockbridge and St Fechin's round out the field.

The final was contested on August 9, between St Fechin's and Naomh Moninne in a repeat of last year's final. St. Fechins won with a scoreline of 2-18 to 2-16 to win their 7th title.

== Participating teams ==
Team	Location	Titles	Last title
Knockbridge	Knockbridge	12	2020
Naomh Moninne	Dundalk	23	2025
St Fechin's	Termonfeckin	6	2024

== Group stage ==
=== Group stage table ===
Advance to final

Team	Matches				Score			Pts
Team	Pld	W	D	L	For	Against	Diff	Pts
Naomh Moninne H.C.	2	1	1	0	55	48	7	3
St Fechin's	2	1	0	1	41	41	0	2
Knockbridge	2	0	1	1	38	45	-7	1

==== Fixtures ====
9 Jul Round 1	Knockbridge	1-23 - 2-20	Naomh Moninne

16 Jul Round 2	Knockbridge	1-9 - 0-19	St Fechin's

23 Jul Round 3	St Fechin's	1-19 - 2-23	Naomh Moninne

== Knockout stage ==
=== Bracket ===
Final
1	Naomh Moninne	2-16
2	St Fechin's	2-18

==== Fixtures ====
9 Aug Final	Naomh Moninne	2-16 - 2-18	St Fechin's
		Report
