= 2011 Nicky Rackard Cup =

- Dates: 23 April – 4 June 2011
- Teams: 6
- Champions: London
- Runners-up: Louth
- Relegated: Fingal

Tournament statistics
- Matches played: 9
- Goals scored: 31 (3.44 per match)
- Points scored: 269 (29.89 per match)

The 2011 Nicky Rackard Cup is the seventh season of the Nicky Rackard Cup since its establishment in 2005. A total of six teams will contest the Nicky Rackard Cup, including five sides from the 2010 Nicky Rackard Cup and one promoted team from the 2010 Lory Meagher Cup. The teams are:

- Fingal
- Monaghan
- London
- Roscommon
- Sligo
- Louth

== Structure ==
The tournament has a double elimination format - each team will play at least two games before being knocked out.

- There are two Round 1 matches.
  - The winners in Round 1 advance to the Round 2.
  - The losers in Round 1 go into the quarter-finals.
- There are two Round 2 matches.
  - The winners in Round 2 advance to the semifinals.
  - The losers in Round 2 go into the quarter-finals.
- There are two quarter-final matches between the Round 1 losers and Round 2 winners.
  - The winners of the quarter-finals advance to the semifinals.
  - The losers of the quarter-finals play a relegation playoff.
    - The losers of the relegation playoff are relegated to the Lory Meagher Cup for 2012.
- There are two semifinal matches between the Round 2 winners and the quarter-final winners.
  - The winners of the semifinals advance to the final.
  - The losers of the semifinals are eliminated.
- The winners of the final win the Nicky Rackard Cup for 2011 and are promoted to the Christy Ring Cup for 2012.

== Fixtures ==
=== Round 1 ===
23 April 2011

London	1-19 - 1-17	Roscommon
K Canty 0-6, P Sloane 0-5 (3f), K Bolger, R O'Connell 0-3 each, S Ryan 1-0, H E Cooney, Vaughan 0-1 each	Report	Gary Fallon 0-8 (5f), M Kelly 1-2 (1-1f), K Connelly 0-4, D Nolan 0-3

Ruislip
Referee: S Whelan (Wexford)

23 April 2011

Sligo	1-07 - 4-18	Louth
D Loughnane 1-1, C Brenan, K Raymond (2f) 0-2 each, L Reidy, D Burke 0-1 each.	Report	G Smyth 1-4 (3f), B Corcoran 1-3, D Murphy 1-2 (1-2f), K McNally 1-1, S Fennell 0-3 (2f), W Morrissey 0-2, S Callan, D Horan, Diarmuid O'Sullivan 0-1 each

Markievicz Park, Sligo
Referee: E Shaughnessy (Galway)

=== Round 2 ===
30 April 2011

Fingal	2-12 - 1-17	Monaghan
D Byrne 2-2, J M Sheridan 0-6 (5f), P Daly, A McInerney 0-2 each.	Report	M McHugh 1-13 (0-10f, 0-2 '65'), S Lambe 0-2, T Hilliard, E MacSuibhne 0-1 each

Swords
Referee: S Cleere (Kilkenny)

30 April 2011

Louth	1-10 - 6-20	London
G Smyth 0-6 (2f, 2 '65'), Diarmuid O'Sullivan 1-0, D Dunne 0-2, Donagh O'Sullivan, B Corcoran 0-1 each	Report	M Finn 1-6 (6f), P Sloane 1-3, J Maher 2-0, K Canty 1-2, R O'Connell 0-4, K Bolger 0-3, H Vaughan 1-0, J Mulcahy 0-2

Dowdallshill, Dundalk
Referee: P Murphy (Carlow)

=== Quarter-finals ===
7 May 2011

Sligo	0-11 - 3-19	Fingal
D Loughnane 0-3 A Cawley 0-2, K Raymond 0-2 (1 '65), T Conneely, J Kelly, L Reidy, R Molloy (f) 0-1 each	Report	A McInerney 1-4, A Richardson 2-0, JM Sheridan 0-6 (2 '65's, 2f), G Dillon 0-4, N Ring 0-3, D Byrne 0-2

Swords
Referee: P Dwyer (Carlow)

7 May 2011

Roscommon	1-14 - 3-09	Louth
J Coyne 1-4 (0-4f), M Kelly 0-4 (2f, 2 '65'), G Fallon 0-3f, K Conneely 0-2, D Nolan 0-1	Report	D Murphy 2-0, G Smyth 0-3 (2f), D Kettle 1-0, D Dunne, B Corcoran 0-2 each, Donagh O'Sullivan, Diarmuid O'Sullivan 0-1 each

Dowdallshill, Dundalk
Referee: F Smith (Meath)

=== Semifinals ===
21 May 2011

London	1-29 - 1-05	Fingal
M Finn 0-9 (6f, 2 '65s'), P Sloane 1-4, R O'Connell, N Forde 0-3 each, S Ryan, H Vaughan 0-2 each, M Walsh, G Hill, K Bolger, K Falvey, S Richardson, J Maher 0-1 each	Report	A McInerney 1-0 (f), JM Sheridan (2f), N Ring 0-2 each, M Cussen 0-1

Ruislip
Referee: T Ryan (Tipperary)

21 May 2011

Louth	2-17 - 1-13	Monaghan
Diarmuid Murphy 0-9 (5f, 2 '65'), S Callan, Donagh O'Sullivan 1-1 each, B Corcoran 0-3, W Morrissey 0-2, G Smyth 0-1(f)	Report	S Lambe 1-6 (4f), M McHugh(2f), G Boyd 0-2 each, T Hilliard, S Leonard, E MacSuibhne, B McGuigan 0-1 each

Clones
Referee: P Murphy (Carlow)

=== Final ===
4 June 2011

London	2-20 - 0-11	Louth
Finn (2-8, 6f, 1 '65), Canty 0-5, S. Ryan, Walsh (0-2 each), O'Connell, Forde, Mulcahy (0-1 each)		Murphy (0-8f), Diarmuid O'Sullivan, Fennell, Horan (0-1 each)

Croke Park, Dublin
Referee: M.Haverty (Galway)

GK	1	Aidan Ryan (St Gabriel's)
RCB	2	Tony Hogan (Brothers Pearse)
FB	3	Brian Costello (St Gabriel's)
LCB	4	Colm Burke (St Gabriel's)
RHB	5	Michael Walsh (Robert Emmetts)
LCB	6	Colm Forde (Kilburn Gaels)
RHB	7	Gary Hill (Robert Emmetts)
CHB	8	Enda Cooney (St Gabriel's)
LHB	9	Kevin Bolger (Robert Emmetts)
MF	10	Richard O'Connell (St Catherine's, Cork)
MF	11	Shane Ryan (Robert Emmetts)
RHF	12	Niall Forde (Kilburn Gaels) (c)
RCF	13	Pat Sloane (St Gabriel's)
FF	14	Martin Finn (St Gabriel's)
LCF	15	Henry Vaughan (Kilburn Gaels)
Substitutes:
	16	Kevin Canty (St Gabriel's) for Cooney
	17	Jonathan Maher (Kilburn Gaels) for Vaughan
	18	David Maher (Seán Treacys) for Hill
	19	Jimmy Mulcahy (Brothers Pearse) for Bolger
	20	Kevin Walsh (St Gabriel's) for Sloane
Manager:
Éamonn Phelan

GK	1	Eddie McArdle (Naomh Moninne)
RCB	2	Mark Wallace (Knockbridge)
FB	3	Conor Kerrigan (Knockbridge)
LCB	4	Adrian Wallace (Knockbridge)
RHB	5	Derek Horan (Shannon Rovers, Tipperary)
CHB	6	Ronan Byrne (Knockbridge) (c)
LHB	7	Donagh O'Sullivan (Knockaderry, Limerick)
MF	8	Gerard Smyth (Pearse Óg)
MF	9	David Dunne (Knockbridge)
RHF	10	Brian Corcoran (Mattock Rangers)
CHF	11	Shane Callan (Pearse Óg)
LHF	12	Diarmuid Murphy (Naomh Moninne)
RCF	13	Peter Brennan (Knockbridge)
FF	14	David Kettle (Knockbridge)
LCF	15	Diarmuid O'Sullivan (Knockaderry, Limerick)
Substitutes:
	16	Wesley Morrissey (Patrickswell, Limerick) for Brennan
	17	Darren O'Hanrahan (Naomh Moninne) for Smyth
	18	Shane Fennell (Knockbridge) for Kettle
	19	Kevin McNally (Knockbridge) for Diarmuid O'Sullivan
	20	Brian Hassett (Pearse Óg) for Corcoran
Manager:
Paddy Kelly

Round 1
Louth	4-18
Sligo	1-07
London	1-19
Roscommon	1-17

Round 2 Quarter-finals
Monaghan	1-17
Fingal	2-12
Louth	3-09
Roscommon	1-14
Sligo	0-11
Fingal	3-19
Louth	1-10
London	6-20

Semi-finals
Monaghan	1-13
Louth	2-17
Fingal	1-05
London	1-29

Final
Louth	0-11
London	2-20

== Scoring ==
- Widest winning margin: 25 points
  - London 6-20 - 1-10 Louth (Round 2)
- Most goals in a match: 7
  - London 6-20 - 1-10 Louth (Round 2)
- Most points in a match: 36
  - London 1-19 - 1-17 Roscommon (Round 1)
- Most goals by one team in a match: 6
  - London 6-20 - 1-10 Louth (Round 2)
- Most goals scored by a losing team: 2
  - Fingal 2-12 - 1-17 Monaghan (Round 2)
- Most points scored by a losing team: 17
  - London 1-19 - 1-17 Roscommon (Round 1)
