= 2010 Leinster Senior Football Championship final =

2010 Leinster Football Final
- Event: 2010 Leinster Senior Football Championship
Louth	Meath
1–10	1–12
- Date: 11 July 2010
- Venue: Croke Park, Dublin
- Man of the Match: Eamonn McAuley (Louth)
- Referee: Martin Sludden (Tyrone)
- Attendance: 48,875

The 2010 Leinster Senior Football Championship final was the last football match of the 2010 Leinster Senior Football Championship, played between Louth and Meath on 11 July 2010 in Croke Park, Dublin. Louth were appearing in their first Leinster Senior Football Championship Final in 50 years. The game is memorable for its contentious conclusion, such that in 2020 it was described as "the most controversial Leinster final ever".

Meath won by 1–12 to 1–10, thanks to a controversial late goal by Joe Sheridan. The goal was deemed illegal by television replays but was declared valid by referee Martin Sludden, from County Tyrone. He then blew the final whistle. Irate Louth fans stormed the pitch and commenced a process of chasing and physically assaulting the referee, who had to be led away by a Garda escort in scenes broadcast to a live television audience. Other scenes of violence saw bottles being hurled from a stand, one striking a steward who fell to the ground. The situation led to much media debate in the week that followed, the violence was condemned by senior politicians (some of whom were in the stadium), and there were calls for the game to be replayed—though, ultimately, this did not happen.

Seán Moran of The Irish Times said the next day: "What will be most vividly remembered of the 2010 final was compressed into a minute at the very end of the match with Louth getting ready to celebrate a deserved win – first over their neighbours in 35 years – and a resilient display". Colm Keys of the Irish Independent said it was "hard to disagree" that it was "the greatest injustice for many a year in Croke Park", and remarked: "The 320th anniversary of the Battle of the Boyne is being commemorated today, but that surely didn't throw up a talking point to match a Joe Sheridan goal that will have the counties divided by the same river at odds for years to come".

== History of rivalry ==
Louth and Meath were rivals of old, both winning the All-Ireland Senior Football Championship in the 1950s; however, this was to be Louth's first appearance in the Leinster Senior Football Championship final since a 1960 loss to Offaly. According to Colm O'Rourke, "there was a time in the late 1940s and '50s when Meath and Louth were the two best teams in the province [of Leinster] and played some memorable championship games". Keith Duggan of The Irish Times reported that the two teams "fight like alley cats". They had last met four years previously in a preliminary round of the Leinster Senior Football Championship, with Meath emerging victorious. Louth had last defeated Meath in 1975, also at Croke Park. Three matches were required to produce a winner when the two encountered each other in July 1949. Other meetings include a draw in a semi-final of the 1951 Leinster Senior Football Championship, with Meath narrowly winning the replay. Meath also defeated Louth in the 1952 Leinster Senior Football Championship Final. Following on from Louth's aforementioned 1975 victory, there were other Meath wins in 1998, 2002 and 2006.

== Route to the final ==
Preliminary Round: Louth 1–11 Longford 1–7; Meath 1–20 Offaly 2–7
Quarter-finals: Louth 1–22 Kildare 1–16; Meath 2–14 Laois 0–10
Semi-finals: Louth 1–15 Westmeath 2–10; Meath 5–9 Dublin 0–13

== Pre-match ==
=== Team selection ===
On 9 July, both teams announced their teams for the final. Meath announced their team first, with captain Nigel Crawford, returning after injury, replacing Mark Ward in midfield.

=== Attendance ===
It was anticipated beforehand that attendance would be at its lowest of the decade, estimated at 45,000 or 50,000 by Ian O'Riordan of The Irish Times. 48,875 people attended the game. The issue of applying fencing around Croke Park to prevent pitch invasions had been discussed prior to the game. The violent scenes which followed the 2010 Leinster Senior Football Championship Final renewed this debate in the days afterwards, though President Cooney later said "the last thing we want to do is put fencing up around Croke Park".

== Match ==
=== Summary ===
Louth's JP Rooney and Shane Lennon both missed opportunities in the first half. Louth dominated the second half, though spurned numerous opportunities to take a commanding lead over Meath. Rooney scored a goal with seven minutes of the game left. Meath converted two long-range free kicks from Cian Ward, but Louth still led by one point in the final minute. Louth's Colm Judge was sent off in the 69th minute for a second bookable offence. Then came the controversial goal by Joe Sheridan in the fourth minute of stoppage time. The ball was kicked into the square by Graham Reilly. It came out to Séamus Kenny, who could have gone for the point, but saw a goal chance and shot. But the ball was blocked by Louth captain Paddy Keenan, and fell into the square, towards Louth full-back Dessie Finnegan. But Finnegan failed to clear and the ball went straight to Joe Sheridan, who fell over the goal line and then threw the ball into the net – both illegal moves. Sheridan was also "inside the square" at the time the ball reached him, in a third illegal move. Yet the goal was allowed and all of a sudden Meath were winning by two points. Referee Sludden checked with the umpire and did not change his mind, blowing his whistle for full-time soon after with the score at Meath 1–12: Louth 1–10, much to the disappointment of everyone associated with Louth. TV replays immediately demonstrated that the referee was incorrect when he awarded the goal to Meath.

=== Violence ===
Footage of the end of the match and post-match pitch invasions
- Louth V Meath 11/07/2010: End of match scenes

Louth fans poured onto the pitch to express their feelings to the referee, and, in the words of The Irish Times, "all hell broke loose". At least four fans physically attacked Sludden and struck him with violence. One man who was wearing a red shirt shoved Sludden in the chest before being pursued by television cameras as he made his departure. Sludden was awarded a Garda escort as he made haste his escape from the pitch. Stadium director Peter McKenna said the referee was "very shaken" after his experience.

Louth manager Peter Fitzpatrick intervened to physically urge the fans to halt their behaviour, an act later described by the Irish Independent as "a remarkable display of composure from the Dundalk man, who had every right to be spitting feathers at the defeat". Meath substitute Mark Ward was hit by a Louth fan. Children cried and looked sad, and one child allegedly received a wound when hit by a steward. Bottles were hurled from the stands. A steward also received wounds when he was assaulted by a soft drinks bottle. He was given medical attention, and later declared fit to steward further matches.

Elsewhere in the stadium, former Meath All-Ireland Senior Football Championship-winning manager Seán Boylan was involved in an altercation with an irate Louth fan in a corporate box. Boylan said: "People lose the head all the time" and that he was "more embarrassed than anything".

=== Details ===
11 July 2010
14:00 UTC+1

Louth	1–10 – 1–12	Meath
JP Rooney (1-1), B White (0-4, 3f), C Judge (0-2, 1f), P Keenan (0-1), A McDonnell (0-1), A Reid (0-1)	(Report)	G Reilly (0-4), C Ward (0-4, 4f), J Sheridan (1-0), S Bray (0-2), A Moyles (0-1), N Crawford (0-1)

Croke Park, Dublin
Attendance: 48,875
Referee: Martin Sludden (Tyrone)

Louth	Meath

GK	1	Neil Gallagher (Cooley Kickhams)
RCB	2	Eamonn McAuley (Na Piarsaigh)
FB	3	Dessie Finnegan (St Patrick's)
LCB	4	Ronan Greene (Naomh Malachi)
RHB	5	Ray Finnegan (St Patrick's)
CHB	6	Mick Fanning (Naomh Máirtín)
LHB	7	John O'Brien (Seán O'Mahony's)
MF	8	Paddy Keenan (St Patrick's) (c)
MF	9	Brian White (Cooley Kickhams)
RHF	10	Andy McDonnell (Newtown Blues)
CHF	11	Mark Brennan (Mattock Rangers)
LHF	12	Adrian Reid (Mattock Rangers)
RCF	13	Colm Judge (Newtown Blues)
FF	14	Shane Lennon (Kilkerley Emmets)
LCF	15	JP Rooney (Naomh Máirtín)
Substitutes:
	16	Stephen Fitzpatrick (Clan na Gael) for Greene
	17	Aaron Hoey (St Bride's) for Fanning
	18	Páraic Smith (Dreadnots) for Lennon
	19	Declan Byrne (St Mochta's) for Reid
Manager:
Peter Fitzpatrick

GK	1	Brendan Murphy (Trim)
RCB	2	Chris O'Connor (Ballinabrackey)
FB	3	Kevin Reilly (Navan O'Mahonys)
LCB	4	Eoghan Harrington (Wolfe Tones)
RHB	5	Gary O'Brien (Navan O'Mahonys)
CHB	6	Anthony Moyles (St Oliver Plunketts/Eoghan Ruadh, Dublin)
LHB	7	Caoimhín King (Dunshaughlin)
MF	8	Brian Meade (Rathkenny)
MF	9	Nigel Crawford (Dunboyne) (c)
RHF	10	Séamus Kenny (Simonstown Gaels)
CHF	11	Joe Sheridan (Seneschalstown)
LHF	12	Graham Reilly (St Colmcille's)
RCF	13	Cian Ward (Wolfe Tones)
FF	14	Shane O'Rourke (Simonstown Gaels)
LCF	15	Stephen Bray (Navan O'Mahonys)
Substitutes:
	16	Cormac McGuinness (Navan O'Mahonys) for Moyles
	17	Peadar Byrne (Ballinlough) for O'Rourke
Manager:
Éamonn O'Brien

== View of match participants ==
=== Joe Sheridan ===
Joe Sheridan, who scored the controversial goal, described how he had done it: "It was well-worked and it was a definite goal. People are saying I threw it in, but I was heading for the line and I just dropped the ball and it was in the net. I got it and the lad just pushed me into the net. I tried to do whatever I could to hit it and the goal was given, simple as that. I was pushed in over the line so it should have been a penalty anyway. I think it was a perfect goal".

=== Match officials ===
Referee Martin Sludden later admitted he had made an error. His referee's report acknowledged a "terrible mistake". However, based on past refereeing errors, his place on the panel of 18 referees to officiate during the 2010 All-Ireland Senior Football Championship was secure, though the likelihood of him refereeing another match was less so. It was thought likely he had been deducted four points from one hundred for his error by his assessor (1 for missing a foul and 3 for Meath profiting from it with a score), though rules banning the assessor from looking at video evidence meant Sludden may not have been deducted any points if the assessor could not see the incident properly from the stand.

=== Team managers ===
Louth manager Peter Fitzpatrick said he was "absolutely devastated" on RTÉ. Appearing later on radio station LMFM, he described the referee as "Dick Turpin without a mask", adding "It was pure daylight robbery. I'm very, very annoyed".

When questioned at a press conference about Sheridan's goal, Meath manager Eamon O'Brien said: "I can't say and I'm not commenting. I can comment, as I said to RTÉ, that loads of decisions were made during the game that didn't go our way. I can recall three or four balls that were blown for picking off the ground that I didn’t think were off the ground. Nigel Crawford was booked up here and Louth got a point off it. The game goes for 70 minutes, decisions are made and you live with it. That’s it, that’s the way I see it".

=== Other players ===
Meath's captain Nigel Crawford gave his opinion on the incident: "I'm sure most players have been involved in controversial situations like that where you get calls for replays and things like that happening, but I just don't think it's possible or I just don't think it can happen. If you start that, where do you end up? Do we go back and say the ball wasn’t on the ground when we touched it and they got a free or whatever? It's just very unfortunate that it happens in a high-profile game right at the end of a game to a team that hasn't won in a long time. It's just a very unfortunate situation".

Louth player J. P. Rooney said: "Aaron Hoey was pleading with [Sludden] to consult with his umpires but when he went in, he told them to put up the green flag. [...] I know it's wrong, people running at the ref, but you can see why Louth people did it. He brought it on himself and I wouldn't feel sorry for him".

== Reaction ==
=== Media ===
The Irish Independent said "Meath's Leinster Final goal-that-never-was will go down in history – and not only in Ireland, since by now the images have flashed round the world – among the great injustices suffered in any sport". The Irish Times described "ugly scenes", with Damian Cullen calling it "one of the strangest endings ever to a GAA match", Seán Moran describing it as "the most extraordinary refereeing error since Jimmy Cooney whistled up early 12 years ago", and the newspaper publishing numerous letters on the topic from disgruntled members of the public every day that week. The same newspaper's Philip Reid remarked upon the coincidence that these events had occurred on the same day as the 2010 FIFA World Cup Final in South Africa, wondered why goal-line technology could not be used and added: "On this point, it would appear, the GAA and FIFA have something in common: they live in the times of the dinosaur". The events in Croke Park led to less prominent newspaper coverage of the FIFA World Cup Final itself the next day. The incident surrounding the goal was likened to Thierry Henry's illegal handball in the France vs Republic of Ireland 2010 FIFA World Cup play-off. Public service broadcaster RTÉ referred to "disgraceful scenes". The GAA website's official match report brushed aside the controversy, saying Sheridan had "smuggled the ball over the line". Eugene McGee, writing in the Irish Independent, said "It will be a stain on the good name of the GAA if this result is allowed to stand". His colleague Martin Breheny said there ought to be no replay and that "no sport can run its affairs on the basis of sentiment".

=== GAA administrators ===
The following day, the GAA released a statement confirming that Sludden admitted he had made an error. The GAA also stated that the rules left it powerless to offer a replay and that this would be decided by Meath, though most Meath players did not wish to facilitate a replay, while former Meath players were said to be in favour of one. The GAA said it would work with the authorities to capture Sludden's attackers.

GAA President Christy Cooney said the events were a "watershed" and one where the "circumstances were bizarre. I have never seen circumstances like it as long as I have been a member of this Association". He promised life bans for those who assaulted the referee.

Croke Park's stadium director Peter McKenna questioned why Louth manager Peter Fitzpatrick had walked onto the pitch to ask the referee about the decision. Gaelic Players Association (GPA) chief executive Dessie Farrell said: "What went on last Sunday was a PR disaster for us all". The National Referees Committee gave a negative response to the idea of goal-line technology being used in future. Retired referee John Bannon said "No one deserves to be attacked, either verbally or physically, especially in Croke Park. [...] This attitude still remains part of the GAA's culture, it has never been rooted out". Tyrone County Board (from where the referee originated) sympathised with the Sludden but said the crowd's reaction was "unbelievable". Liam O'Neill, a candidate for the GAA presidency in 2012, later said: "Quite simply, there should have been a re-fixture for that game. Everyone knows that. Everyone knows a wrong was perpetrated".

=== GAA personalities ===
There was significant public and analytical support for Louth and condemnation of the refereeing decision.

On The Sunday Game TV highlights programme, Pat Spillane called both the fans and the referee "disgraceful", commenting:

Those were disgraceful scenes at the end. Cowardly individuals attacking a referee who is doing it in a voluntary capacity. There is no place in the GAA for people like that. Scandalous scenes and a bad day for the GAA on that account. A fella doing a job made a human error. He made a mistake. We cannot condone those scenes, they are disgraceful and punishments must be handed out. However, just as disgraceful is that Louth were robbed of their first Leinster title since 1957 by a complete refereeing mistake. Joe Sheridan threw the ball over the line. Under any rules of the game, experimental or not, the goal should not have been allowed.

Former Meath player Trevor Giles said: "If this victory stands, it won't do Meath any favours because there will always be a question mark over the result". Former Kerry footballer Darragh Ó Sé described the idea of Meath County Board having the final decision on a replay as "a complete and utter cop-out". Former Kerry footballer and manager Páidí Ó Sé said: "there is no way any referee should have allowed Sheridan's goal to stand". Sligo footballer Eamonn O'Hara suggested that the events gave "the perfect opportunity [for the GAA] to revamp the way match-day officials are selected".

Veteran commentator Mícheál Ó Muircheartaigh told Ryan Tubridy on his radio show that "Croke Park abdicated responsibility. They should have taken the matter from Meath".

=== Politicians ===
Minister for Justice and Law Reform Dermot Ahern, himself from Louth, made known his condemnation of the violence. He attended the match. Taoiseach Brian Cowen also made known his disapproval later from New York: "I didn't see what happened as the ref was leaving the pitch. But obviously none of that is justified. It was an exciting match obviously. But it doesn't justify anyone engaging in that sort of activity. So I wouldn't like to see it repeated anywhere". Cowen was also at the match.

=== Other ===
The Garda Síochána announced that it would investigate those persons they said breached the Non-fatal Offences Against the Person Act by battering the referee and others.

Bookmaker Boylesports paid all losing bets on the match.

== Outcome ==
On 13 July, Louth's county executive committee issued a statement condemning what it described as "the unsavoury incidents after the match". Meath's county board gathered in Navan but did not issue an immediate statement, instead requesting more time to think. They later decided that there would be no replay, this would be "the end of the matter". Meath were officially champions of Leinster for 2010, though Meath secretary Cyril Creavin conceded that it was a "tainted" title and that "Some of the players are devastated with the reaction in newspapers". Louth accepted this: their official statement referred to the July 2010 R238 traffic collision which occurred on the same day as the final, sympathising with relatives of the eight people killed, and opting to avoid legal action in such a context. Therefore, Meath automatically entered the quarter-finals of the All-Ireland Senior Football Championship, with Louth left to qualify for that same stage by playing (and winning) a further game in Round 4 of the All-Ireland qualifiers.

Louth were drawn against Dublin in their next game. The appointment of experienced referee Pat McEnaney was scrutinised and praised in advance. In the game, held once again at Croke Park on 24 July, Louth were defeated by 2–14 to 0–13, thus being eliminated from the 2010 All-Ireland Senior Football Championship. By defeating Louth, Dublin joined Meath in the quarter-finals of the All-Ireland Senior Football Championship. For Louth so ended "the longest summer the county has witnessed in over half a century".

== Legacy ==
Louth manager Fitzpatrick found success as a national politician; he was elected as a TD at the 2011 general election and re-elected several times after that. He continued as Louth manager until after the 2012 season, at which point he left.

On 15 September 2014, "A Wee Royal Rumble - The Story of the 2010 Leinster Football Final" was broadcast on RTÉ One as part of Scannal, the TV series dedicated to scandalous events.

Nearly ten years later, in a newspaper article published on Easter Sunday, Fitzpatrick - who had earlier watched the match for just the third time since (the first having been the night it was played) - stated that he had seen referee Sludden only once since: "I went to Michaela Harte's funeral [in mid-January 2011] and he was ahead of me in the queue. That's the only time. I have never seen or [sic] spoken to him since".

Until 2025, neither team (nor, in fact, any team other than Dublin) won the Leinster Senior Football Championship, with each team having been to two finals (Meath in 2019 and 2020, Louth in 2023 and 2024). However, Louth finally bridged a 68-year gap beating Meath in the 2025 final, and in a tongue-in-cheek recognition of the events of their previous final encounter, Louth defender Dermot Campbell threw the championship trophy, the Delaney Cup, into the goal.
