= 2025 Louth Senior Hurling Championship =

- Dates: 10 July - 10 August, 2025
- Teams: 3
- Champions: Naomh Moninne (23rd title)
- Runners-up: St Fechin's

The 2025 Louth Senior Hurling Championship was the 70th staging of the Louth Senior Hurling Championship since its establishment by the Louth County Board.

Three teams contested the Louth Senior Hurling Championship. All three teams entered the round-robin stage stage, playing each other in home or away fixtures, guaranteeing at least two championship games. The top two teams after three rounds play in a lone final.

St Fechin's entered the championship as defending champions. Knockbridge and Naomh Moninne round out the field.

The final was contested on August 10, between St Fechin's and Naomh Moninne at the Gaelic Grounds in Drogheda, with the defending champions aiming for their fifth straight title. Naomh Moninne won the contest 3-15 to 2-14 for their first title since 2019, and record 23rd overall.

== Participating teams ==
| Team | Location | Titles | Last title |
|---|---|---|---|
| Knockbridge | Knockbridge | 12 | 2020 |
| Naomh Moninne | Dundalk | 22 | 2019 |
| St Fechin's | Termonfeckin | 6 | 2024 |

== Group stage ==
=== Group stage table ===
Advance to final

| Team | Matches | | | | Score | | | Pts |
| Team | Pld | W | D | L | For | Against | Diff | Pts |
|---|---|---|---|---|---|---|---|---|
| St Fechin's | 2 | 1 | 1 | 0 | 40 | 33 | 7 | 3 |
| Naomh Moninne | 2 | 1 | 0 | 1 | 41 | 40 | 1 | 2 |
| Knockbridge | 2 | 0 | 1 | 1 | 32 | 40 | -8 | 1 |

==== Fixtures ====
| 10 Jul Round 1 | Naomh Moninne | 1-14 - 2-18 | St Fechin's |

| 17 Jul Round 2 | St Fechin's | 0-16 - 2-10 | Knockbridge |

| 24 Jul Round 3 | Knockbridge | 1-21 - 1-13 | Naomh Moninne |

== Knockout stage ==
=== Bracket ===
Final
1 | St Fechin's | 3-14
2 | Naomh Moninne | 3-15

==== Fixtures ====
| 10 Aug Final | St Fechin's | 3-14 - 3-15 | Naomh Moninne | Gaelic Grounds |
