= Niall McEneaney =

Irish hurler from County Louth (1979–2024)

Niall Mac Eneaney
Personal information
- Native name: Niall Mac An Déanaigh (Irish)
- Nickname: Trigger
- Born: 1979 Drogheda, County Louth, Ireland
- Died: 17 March 2024 (aged 44) Drogheda, County Louth, Ireland
- Occupation: General operative
- Height: 5 ft 4 in (163 cm)

Sport
- Sport: Hurling
- Position: Corner-forward
Clubs
- Years: Club
- Wolfe Tones; Mattock Rangers
Club titles
- Louth titles: 1
Inter-county
- Years: County
- Louth
Inter-county titles
- Leinster titles: 0
- All-Irelands: 0
- NHL: 1
- All Stars: 0

Niall MacEneaney (1979 – 17 March 2024) was an Irish hurler and hurling coach. At club level he played with Wolfe Tones and Mattock Rangers was also a member of the Louth senior hurling team. MacEneaney also coached the St Fechin's club.

== Career ==
MacEneaney began his hurling career at club level with Wolfe Tones in Drogheda. He won a Louth SHC medal and a Kilmacud Crokes All-Ireland Sevens Hurling shield with the club in 1996 before later joining the Mattock Rangers club. MacEneaney was a member of the Louth senior hurling team that won the 2000 National Hurling League and also lined out at corner forward on the Louth senior hurling team that reached the inaugural Nicky Rackard Cup final, losing to London in the 2005 final. As a coach, he guided St Fechin's to consecutive Louth SHC titles in 2022 and 2023.

== Death ==
MacEneaney died in a hit and run in Drogheda, County Louth, on 17 March 2024, at the age of 44. The driver of the vehicle was an off duty Garda who in June 2026 was convicted and sentenced to prison. In March 2026 a permanent memorial of two crossed Hurling sticks was erected by Niall's family at the site of the accident in tribute to his love and dedication to the sport, alongside a touching poem about his passion for the sport and his three dogs.

== Honours ==
=== Player ===
Wolfe Tones

- Louth Senior Hurling Championship: 1996
- Kilmacud Crokes - All Ireland 7s Junior Champions: 1996

Louth Hurling

- National Hurling League - Division 3 Champions: 2000

=== Management ===
St Fechin's

- Louth Senior Hurling Championship: 2022, 2023
