= Éamonn Phelan =

Irish hurler

Personal information
- Native name: Éamonn Ó Faoláin (Irish)
- Born: 1974 (age 51–52) Carrickshock, County Kilkenny, Ireland
- Occupation: Electrician

Sport
- Sport: Hurling
- Position: Right corner-back
Clubs
- Years: Club
- Carrickshock; Sydney Shamrocks; Seán Treacy's
Club titles
- London titles: 0
Inter-county
- Years: County
- 2004-2013: London
Inter-county titles
- All-Irelands: 3
- NHL: 1
- All Stars: 1

Éamonn Phelan (born 1974) is an Irish retired hurler who played as a right corner-back for the London senior team.

Phelan began his senior career with the team in 2004 and was a regular player on the inter-county scene for six years. During that time he won one Nicky Rackard Cup medal and one National League (Division 3B) medal.

At club level Phelan currently plays with the Seán Treacy's club. He previously lined out with the Sydney Shamrocks club in Sydney and the Carrickshock club in Kilkenny. Sydney Shamrocks player of the year 1998

Shortly after his inter-county retirement Phelan was appointed manager of the London senior hurling team in October 2010. He served in that position until June 2013.

== Playing career ==
=== Club ===
Phelan began his club hurling career with the Carrickshock club in Kilkenny. He had little success with his home club.

After emigrating to Australia, Phelan joined the newly formed Sydney Shamrocks club. In 1998 he won a New South Wales Championship medal, adding to the Shield and League medals he had won earlier in the year as the club pulled off a treble.

Phelan later moved to London where he joined the Seán Treacy's club. He had little success here, losing two championship deciders in three seasons.

=== Inter-county ===
Phelan began his inter-county career as a member of the London senior hurling team. He made his debut in 2004 in an Ulster quarter-final against Derry.

The following year Phelan became a regular member of the starting fifteen. It was a successful year as London qualified for the final of the Nicky Rackard Cup. Louth were the opponents on that occasion but provided little opposition as London claimed the title with a 5-8 to 1-5 victory. It was Phelan's first success with London.

In 2009 Phelan had a mixed season with London. He won a National League (Division 3B) medal following a six-point defeat of Roscommon. London subsequently reached a second Nicky Rackard Cup final against Meath, who won 2-18 to 1-15.

Phelan's side reached the final of the Nicky Rackard Cup once again in 2010, this time against Armagh. A narrow 3-15 to 3-14 score line gave Armagh the title. Phelan retired from inter-county hurling following this defeat.

== Managerial career ==
=== London manager ===
Immediately after his inter-county retirement, Phelan took over as manager of the London senior hurling team. In his debut season he succeeded in guiding the team to a third successive Nicky Rackard Cup final. A 2-20 to 0-11 trouncing of Louth gave London the title and gave Phelan his first major success as manager and secured promotion to the Christy Ring Cup.

The success continued for Phelan's side again in 2012 as London reached the final of the Christy Ring Cup. A 4-18 to 1-17 defeat of Wicklow gave London the title and secured a second successive promotion. Won national hurling league final following year in last year before moving back to Ireland after leading London in Leinster hurling Championships. Took over Mooncoin following year in Kilkenny, getting to the county final only to be beaten.

Sporting positions
Preceded by Brendan Bolger	London Senior Hurling Manager; 2010-2013	Succeeded by Tommy Harrell
Achievements
Preceded by Michael Johnston (Armagh)	Nicky Rackard Cup Final winning manager 2011	Succeeded by Michael Johnston (Armagh)
Preceded by John Meyler (Kerry)	Christy Ring Cup Final winning manager 2012	Succeeded by Gerard Monan (Down)
