= Louth Junior 2B Football Championship =

Annual Gaelic Athletic Association competition

- Founded: 1994
- Title holders: St Kevin's (2nd title)
- Most titles: Roche Emmets (4 titles)

The Louth Junior 2B Football Championship is an annual knockout gaelic football competition organised by Louth GAA, contested by the second teams of Intermediate and Junior clubs in County Louth.

Prior to 1994, the Louth Junior 2A Championship was the only knockout competition for clubs' second teams. That year, the County Board introduced a second knockout competition, confined to the Intermediate and Junior clubs, which would be known as the 2B Championship.

== Trophy ==
The captain of the winning team is presented with the Terry Maher Cup, in memory of the former County Board Chairman.

== Finals ==
(R) = Replay

Year	Winner	Score	Opponent	Score	Winning Captain
1994	Na Piarsaigh	2–09	Lann Léire	1–08	Austin Reid
1995	Roche Emmets	0–15	Dreadnots	0–05	Fergal McGeough
1996	St Kevin's	1–11	O'Connells	0–05	Johnny Bellew
1997	Roche Emmets	0–12	Seán O'Mahony's	2–04	Alan Gartlan
1998	Geraldines	2–11 (R)	Na Piarsaigh	1–12 (R)	Oliver Smith
1999	Oliver Plunketts	1–16	Geraldines	1–03	Paul Dyas
2000	Glyde Rangers	4–09	Dowdallshill	0–07	Aidan Leonard
2001	Oliver Plunketts	2–10	St Fechin's	0–04	Conor Walsh
2002	Seán O'Mahony's	4–09	Kilkerley Emmets	0–09	Peter Doyle
2003	Geraldines	2–08	Seán O'Mahony's	1–04	Gerard Reenan
2004	Na Piarsaigh	0–10	Dreadnots	0–06	-
2005	Na Piarsaigh	1-09	Dundalk Gaels	1–08	Alan Farrelly
2006	Dundalk Gaels	1–10	St Fechin's	1–04	-
2007	Stabannon Parnells	0–13	Oliver Plunketts	1–03	Liam Butterly
2008	Wolfe Tones	0–11	St Fechin's	0–05	Mark McKenna
2009	Geraldines	2–09	O'Raghallaighs	0–05	Vincent Lynch
2010	O'Connells	2–07	St Fechin's	0–08	David Neasy
2011	Cooley Kickhams B	1–08	Roche Emmets	1–05	-
2012	Roche Emmets	1–11	Oliver Plunketts	1–08	Owen O'Hare
2013	Oliver Plunketts	2–08 (R)	Hunterstown Rovers	1–08 (R)	-
2014	Hunterstown Rovers	3–11	Annaghminnon Rovers	3–08	Stuart Callan
2015	St Nicholas	3–10 (R)	Annaghminnon Rovers	3–07 (R)	Dylan Kirwan
2016	Annaghminnon Rovers	2–08	O'Raghallaighs	0–04	Aidan Kerr
2017	O'Raghallaighs	3–08	Na Piarsaigh	3–06	Cathal McGinty
2018	Hunterstown Rovers	0–10	Seán O'Mahony's	0–07	Keith Brennan
2019	Dreadnots	1–13	Naomh Máirtín	0–12	Tony Smith
2020	(Cancelled - COVID-19)				
2021	Roche Emmets	3–14	Hunterstown Rovers	0–10	Liam Rice/Kevin Quigley
2022	Mattock Rangers	2–07	Seán O'Mahony's	0–11	J.P. Watters
2023	Dreadnots	0–16	Naomh Máirtín	1–03	Ronan Califf
2024	Kilkerley Emmets	0–14	St Joseph's	0–06	Micheál McKeown
2025	Newtown Blues	2–14	Dundalk Gaels	0–05	Joe Harte
2026	St Kevin's	2–15	Geraldines	1–11	John King
