= Stephen Fitzpatrick (Gaelic footballer) =

Louth Gaelic footballer

Sport
- Sport: Gaelic football
Club
- Years: Club
- Clan Na Gael
Inter-county
- Years: County
- Louth

Stephen Fitzpatrick is an Irish Gaelic footballer who plays for Clan Na Gael and the Louth county team.

He made his first championship start as left half-back for Louth against Dublin in 2010. He played in the 2010 Leinster Senior Football Championship final, as well as the follow-up 2011 All-Ireland Senior Football Championship qualifier against Meath.

In a 2012 National League match against Monaghan, the two managers had a son playing, with the Fitzpatrick being the son of Louth manager Peter.
