= Kevin Canty =

Kevin Canty may refer to:

- Kevin Canty (author) (born 1953), American author of novels and short stories
- Kevin Canty (hurler) (born 1986), Irish hurler
