= St. Nicholas GFC =

Louth-based Gaelic games club

- Cumann Peil San Nioclás
- Founded: 1976
- County: Louth
- Nickname: The Nicks
- Colours: Red and White
- Grounds: Jimmy Pentony Park, Rathmullan Road, Drogheda
- Coordinates: 53.71344°N 6.37174°W

Playing kits
Standard colours

St. Nicholas GFC is a Gaelic Football club located in Drogheda, County Louth, Ireland. Based in Rathmullan in the south-west of the town, it takes its players from Holy Family Parish and fields teams in competitions organised by Louth GAA.

Founded in 1976, St. Nicholas is one of two Gaelic Football clubs from the south side of Drogheda, together with Wolfe Tones. As of 2023, the club competes in the Louth Junior Championship and Division 3A of the county football Leagues. John "Mexican" Culligan is the current manager of the club's senior team as of 2024, joined by selectors Karl O'Connor and Brian Lynch. Lee Kavanagh is the current club captain.

== Honours ==
- Louth Junior Football Championship (2): 1994, 2008
- Louth Junior 2A Football Championship (1): 1987
- Louth Junior 2B Football Championship (1): 2015
- Louth Junior A Football League (2): 1991, 2002
- Louth Junior A Football League (Division 3B) (1): 2024
- Donagh Cup (1): 1989
- Avonmore Shield (1): 1992
- Louth Under-14 Football Championship (2): 1980, 1982
- Louth Minor B Football Championship (1): 2007
