= Eamonn McAuley =

Irish Gaelic footballer

Sport
- Sport: Gaelic football
Club
- Years: Club
- Na Piarsaigh
Inter-county
- Years: County
- Louth

Eamonn McAuley is an Irish Gaelic footballer who played for Na Piarsaigh and the Louth county team.

McAuley made his senior inter-county debut in the 2010 Leinster Senior Football Championship. This was because he did not play a minute of the 2010 National League. His first match at Croke Park was the 2010 Leinster semi-final. Louth qualified for the 2010 Leinster Senior Football Championship final, a first in five decades. McAuley played in what was a decider with a controversial ending. He protested against the decision to award the Joe Sheridan goal. McAuley was named Man of the Match afterwards. But he later said: "When I was named as Man of the Match it didn't mean anything to me and I didn't want to do the interview."

McAuley also captained his club in 2010. By playing in the 2010 Leinster Senior Football Championship he became the first player from Na Piarsaigh to play senior championship football for Louth. Anthony Tohill and Kevin O'Brien asked McAuley to trial for the 2010 International Rules Series.

McAuley is from Dundalk. He was educated at Coláiste Rís. He is also involved in athletics.
