= Alan Moore (sports administrator) =

Russian athlete

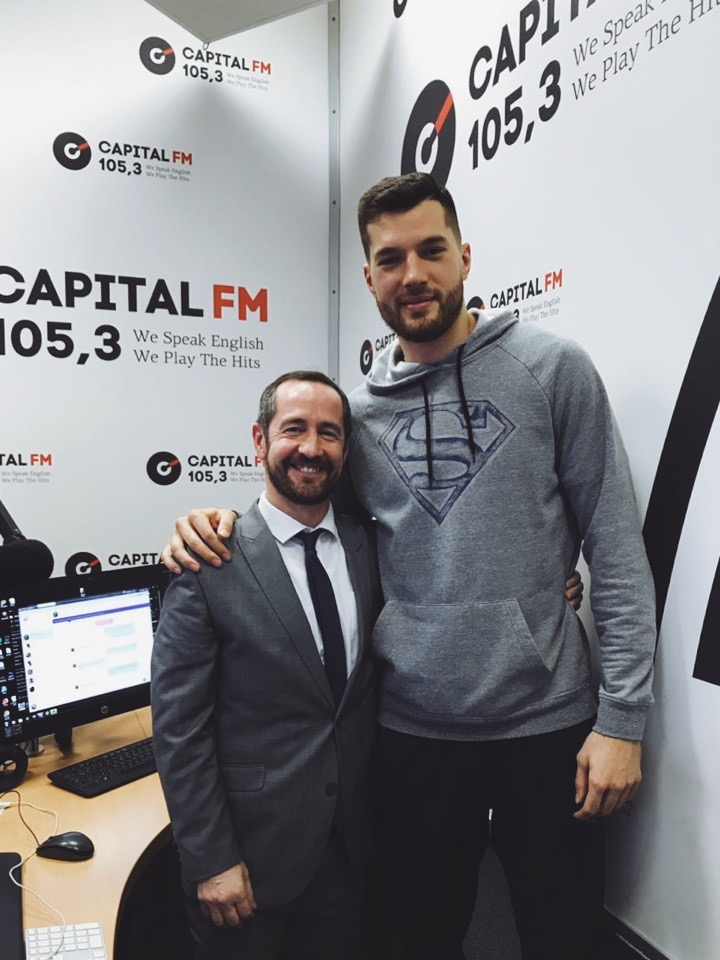
Moore (left) with Alec Peters (right) in 2019

Alan Moore (born 1973) is a retired Irish sportsperson, sports journalist and administrator. Originally from Dublin in Ireland, Moore has lived in Russia since 2007, and (as of 2022) was director of the International Affairs Office of the National University of Science and Technology MISiS in Moscow. As of 2022, he was secretary of Moscow Shamrocks GAC and public relations officer for Gaelic Games Europe.

== Early and personal life ==
Moore lived until he was three years old on Dublin's South Circular Road before moving with his family to Corduff in North West Dublin. Growing up in a GAA household, he played for his local club St Brigid's GAA and later for Naomh Moninne H.C. in Dundalk, where he also coached children's teams. He later studied in University College Dublin.

He self-published two books titled Danger, Kids! 1 and Danger, Kids! 2.

== Academic career ==
He is director of the International Office of National University of Science and Technology MISiS and is an associate professor at the Financial University under the Government of the Russian Federation, having previously been director of the RSSU Centre of International Relations and director of the Russian State Social University College from 2017 to 2020.

In 2018 in Moscow, Moore participated in a panel discussion at an international forum on "Human Rights and Social Guarantees in the context of Challenges of the 21st Century: International and National Experience". He was also a representative in 2018 at the "International Forum in Kirov: Inclusive Education in Higher Education Institutions", and has moderated other university forums.

== Sports career ==
Moore played a range of sports growing up including soccer for a number of local amateur clubs in Dublin. From 1996, he played semi-professionally in Europe, North America and Saudi Arabia. As a boxer, Moore featured for Maynooth University and University College Dublin.

He moved into sports management and founded Rugby Club Knin in Knin, Croatia. While there, he organised a rugby union exhibition game in March 2007 in which the Croatia national rugby union team played an Irish "touring barbarians" team. He has worked with a number of international sports people and teams, including Vitalia Diatchenko and Marta Sirotkina. He taught Gaelic football to members of the FC Lokomotiv Moscow youth team in 2016. Moore was development officer and director of Maltese Premier League Club Floriana F.C. from 2008 to 2010.

In 2019, Moore was coach of the Russian Native Ladies Gaelic Football at the Renault GAA World Games.

== Journalism ==
He is a sports journalist, and since 2017 has produced and hosted "Capital Sports" on Capital FM in Moscow. Former tennis player Ekaterina Bychkova co-hosted with Moore in 2017.

His 2013 article, 'The Fear of the Known', discussed doping in tennis.

Moore was quoted in articles in the Sydney Morning Herald and BuzzFeed in which he spoke about match-fixing in tennis. He and his work has also appeared on news sources and websites like Off the Ball, Championat.com, Sports Daily, RTÉ 2fm, and TRT World.

In the buildup to the FIFA World Cup 2018, Moore decried Russia's lack of quality footballers and feared for their chances on Newstalk. He used his role as a guest of several "radio and TV shows dedicated to the World Cup" to promote the development of the education system at Russian State Social University (RSSU College). In the build up to the 2018 World Cup, he was part of a campaign to prepare visitors to Russia. His "Champ Talks" project was taken to the Jewish Museum and Tolerance Center and involved a discussion forum on topics related to sports, education and society.

== Controversy ==
In September 2020, Moore published an article on backpagefootball.com in which he discussed the misuse of caffeine and other substances as performance-enhancing substances (PEDs). In the article, relying only on an unnamed "source close to the club", Moore claimed that 22 players out of 35 players on the Liverpool F.C. squad were asthmatic. Moore followed-up with a further article, in January 2021, where he alleged that these reputed asthmatic diagnoses allowed Liverpool to obtain "Therpatic Use Exemptions" (TUE) for players to use asthmatic inhalers and thereby bypass sports doping controls. Moore's claims went "viral" and the "wild Liverpool asthma inhaler conspiracy theory" was covered in several sources. The head of the Exercise Respiratory Clinic at the University of Kent, Professor John Dickinson, disputed the claims that inhaler misuse by a non-asthmatic footballer could lead to improved physical performance. Dickinson joined a BBC podcast titled "Debunking the Liverpool FC Conspiracy Theory" in August 2022. In the podcast, Dickinson and journalist Mike Wendling reviewed Moore's claims. Wendling discussed Moore's social media commentary, describing it as broadly pro-Kremlin and a source of unreliable misinformation. The claim of asthmatic and inhaler misuse by Liverpool F.C. was "debunk[ed]" as "spurious rumours" by the BBC podcast contributors.

In March 2022, during the Russian invasion of Ukraine, Russia bombed a children and maternity hospital in Mariupol resulting in at least three deaths, including a child. The Russian embassy in London claimed that footage of a pregnant woman at the scene of the bombing was staged by a beauty blogger. The claim was repeated on Twitter by Moore, who tweeted that "The girl being carried from the rubble is a blogger who came to the hospital for a 'shoot'". In another tweet, Moore referenced "the faked maternity hospital victim" while noting that "this has to be the worst time to want to believe in news reporting". The tweets were subsequently deleted and Moore stated that he did not wish to comment specifically on them, telling The Irish Times that "War has to stop, nobody wants war, nobody should die for oil, for politics . . . War is wrong, people need to start speaking". Moore had previously stated that some Russians were "unhappy" that "Putin took the decision to invade their neighbours".
