= Kevin Canty (hurler) =

Irish hurler

Personal information
- Native name: Caoimhín Ó Cainte (Irish)
- Nickname: Canty
- Born: 1986 (age 39–40) Innishannon, County Cork, Ireland
- Occupation: Carpenter
- Height: 6 ft 2 in (188 cm)

Sport
- Sport: Hurling & Football
- Position: Midfield
Clubs
- Years: Club
- 2004-present 2011-2012: Valley Rovers; St Gabriel's; Galway - Boston
Inter-county*
Years	County	Apps (scores)
2007-2008 2011-present	Cork; London	3 (0-00); 3 (1-13)
Inter-county titles
- Munster titles: 0
- All-Irelands: 0
- NHL: 0
- All Stars: 0
- *Inter County team apps and scores correct as of 23:06, 15 May 2012.

Kevin Canty (born 1986) is an Irish hurler and footballer who currently plays in midfield for the Valley rovers senior football team and centre forward for the Premier intermediate hurling team.

Canty made his debut for the Cork county team in the 2007 championship. He remained on the panel for just two seasons. He subsequently joined the London county team during the 2011 Nicky Rackard Cup, and secured a Nicky Rackard Cup medal that same year.

At club level Canty began his career with Valley Rovers. He had spells with the St Gabriel's club in London and Galway in Boston for a summer. On his return from London, Canty returned to his local club Valley Rovers. Canty has won numerous medals with his club Valley Rovers at juvenile level, including an All Ireland Féile and at adult level including 1 x intermediate football county, 2 x premier intermediate football county and 1 x intermediate hurling County.
