= Pat Sloane =

Irish hurler

Personal information
- Native name: Pádraig Ó Sluáin (Irish)
- Born: 1980 (age 45–46) Cobh, County Cork, Ireland
- Occupation: Mechanical engineer

Sport
- Sport: Hurling
- Position: Right wing-forward
Clubs
- Years: Club
- Cobh; St Gabriel's
Inter-county
- Years: County
- 2011-present: London
Inter-county titles
- Leinster titles: 0
- All-Irelands: 0
- NHL: 0
- All Stars: 0

Pat Sloane or "Sluggers" as he is affectionately known as (born 1980) is an Irish hurler who currently plays as a right wing-forward at senior level for the London county team.

Sloane made his debut with the London senior team in 2011 and immediately became a regular member of the starting fifteen. Since then he has experienced much success, winning a Christy Ring Cup winners' medal and a Nicky Rackard Cup winners' medal.

At club level Sloane is a one-time county club championship medalist with the St Gabriel's club. He began his club career with Cobh in Cork.

Sloane has also represented his division, Imokilly, in the Cork Senior Hurling Championship while in Cork, and was a member of the Cork Under-21 hurling panel in the early 2000s, as well as playing in Fitzgibbon Cup campaigns with his college CIT alongside inter-county players such as Kieran "Fraggy" Murphy and Ronan Curran.
