= Na Piarsaigh/Blackrock CLG =

Louth-based Gaelic games club

Na Piarsaigh/Blackrock
- Na Piarsaigh na gCreagacha Dubha
- Founded: 1982
- County: Louth
- Nickname: Naps
- Colours: Black and Amber
- Grounds: Páirc An tAthair Uí Dhubhthaigh (Fr. Duffy Park)
- Coordinates: 53°59′13″N 6°22′18″W

Playing kits
Standard colours

Na Piarsaigh/Blackrock CLG is a GAA club from Dundalk, County Louth, which fields Gaelic football, Hurling and Camogie teams in competitions organised by Louth GAA. Until the establishment of Omeath's Cúchulainn Gaels in 2005, Na Piarsaigh was the youngest Gaelic football club in Louth.

== History ==
The club was founded in 1982 by residents of the Holy Family parish in Dundalk to provide a sporting outlet for an area of the town experiencing significant population growth. In 1985 the club contested the final of the Louth Junior 2 Championship, finishing runners-up after a replay to Naomh Mhuire of Drogheda. The following year saw Na Piarsaigh claim silverware for the first time by winning the Donagh Cup final against Wolfe Tones, on a scoreline of 1–7 to 1–4. The 1993 Louth Junior Football Championship was the club's first major success. The Christy Bellew Cup was won by virtue of a 2–6 to 0–10 defeat of Glyde Rangers at Haggardstown.

1997 saw Na Piarsaigh clinch the MacArdle Cup as winners of the Division 3 League. The club was also performing strongly at juvenile level, with the Under-14s winning two Championship finals in 1996 and 1998. Coinciding with 20th anniversary celebrations in 2002, they won a second Junior Championship and reached the County minor final for the first time, losing narrowly to Valley Rangers (led by future Louth captain Paddy Keenan) by 0–08 to 0–07. Victory in the Junior final came at the expense of Dowdallshill, who were on the wrong end of a two-point defeat at Clan Na Gael Park.

As junior champions, Na Piarsaigh were promoted to the Intermediate grade of Louth football. The club's under-21s claimed the 2003 Louth Under-21 Football Championship by beating combination side Mattock Rangers/Hunterstown Rovers/Glen Emmets 3–10 to 1–08 in the final at Dromiskin's Cluskey Park. Their second team were victorious in consecutive Junior 2B Championship finals in 2004 and 2005, beating Dreadnots and Dundalk Gaels respectively. The minor team qualified for another Championship final in 2005 but suffered defeat again, this time to Cooley Kickhams at Drogheda's Gaelic Grounds on a scoreline of 2–07 to 1–07.

In 2008, Na Piarsaigh qualified for their first Intermediate Championship final where they met south Louth opponents Dreadnots at Páirc Mhuire, Ardee. A close contest ended in a 2–10 to 1–12 defeat for the Dundalk men.

The team bounced back the following year and returned to the Intermediate final, facing Naomh Malachi at Dromiskin. Two points behind in injury time, a penalty was awarded giving Na Piarsaigh a chance of qualifying for the Senior grade of Louth football for the first time ever. The ball was kicked high over the bar however, allowing Naomh Malachi to claim victory by a single point, 1–12 to 1–11.

The club remained at Intermediate level for many more years but a further appearance in the County final would elude them. In 2018, Na Piarsaigh were relegated back to junior football. Since then, the side has won two Kevin Mullen Shield trophies as subsidiary league winners.

In 2022, the club celebrated 40 years in existence. As of 2023, Na Piarsaigh/Blackrock currently competes in the Louth Junior Football championship and the third Division of the county's football leagues. Former player Paul Sharkey will manage the footballers in 2023.

== Recent developments ==
Known simply as Na Piarsaigh since their formation, the club rebranded as Na Piarsaigh/Blackrock in 2022, after merging with Blackrock Hurling & Camogie club.

== Catchment area ==
Footballers are drawn from the large housing estates of Bay Estate and Muirhevnamór in the Holy Family parish. Members of the hurling and camogie sections of the club will be recruited from the Blackrock area.

== Rivalries ==
The club's matches against fellow Dundalk sides Dundalk Gaels and Clan Na Gael are always keenly contested. However, it is felt that Na Piarsaigh/Blackrock's main rivals are Seán O'Mahony's, due to local geography.

== Inter-county players ==
Former players who have represented Louth at senior inter-county level, include:

- Brendan Nash
- Cormac Malone
- Alan McCartney
- Eamonn McAuley - right corner-back for Louth in the 2010 Leinster Senior Football Championship final against Meath. Received the Man-of-the-Match award for his performance.
- Gary O'Hare

== Achievements ==
- Louth Junior Football Championship (2): 1993, 2002
- Louth Junior A Football League (1): 1997
- Kevin Mullen Shield (2): 2019, 2021
- Louth Junior 2B Football Championship (3): 1994, 2004, 2005
- Donagh Cup (1): 1986
- Louth Under-21 Football Championship (1): 2003
- Louth Under-14 Football Championship (2): 1996, 1998
- Louth Junior 2 Football League Division 6 (3): 2016, 2021, 2022
- Louth Intermediate Football Championship Runners-Up (2): 2008, 2009
- Louth Minor Football Championship Runners-Up (2): 2002, 2005
