= Annaghminnon Rovers GFC =

Louth-based Gaelic games club

- Ragaire Annachminnon CLG
- Founded: 1959
- Nickname: The Rovers
- Grounds: Páirc Annachminnon, Stonetown, County Louth
- Coordinates: 53.96491°N 6.60101°W

Playing kits
Standard colours

Annaghminnon Rovers GFC is a Gaelic football club from the small community of Stonetown in the parish of Louth, in County Louth. Founded in 1959, the club's colours are white and red (white jersey with red hoop). As of 2023, Rovers were competing in the Louth Junior Football Championship and Division 3B of the county football Leagues.

== History ==
Following Louth's 1957 All Ireland win, a need arose in the area to form a club and meetings took place in 1958 in the town land of Annaghminnon. The club was finally granted affiliation after several failed attempts in 1959. The club's maiden championship was achieved in 1964 after a narrow victory of John Mitchells and the team was managed by Jim Quigley who had led Louth's All Ireland campaign seven years previously. Junior Championship success would not follow for another 36 years until 2000, when Rovers beat Tullyallen's Glen Emmets by 2 points to lift the Christy Bellew JFC cup.

Annaghminnon has spent the majority of its footballing life in the junior ranks of Louth football with a brief two-year period in the intermediate grade in 2001 and 2002. For the years 2012-2018 the club regraded to the reserve divisions. In 2019, they returned to the junior grade.

The club football field, dressing rooms and community hall are situated in Stonetown, near Dundalk in County Louth. Pairc Annachminnon was opened in 1987, the community hall was erected in 1991, and new dressing rooms were constructed in 2008.

Páirc Annachminnon provided a temporary home for Monaghan club Magheracloone Mitchells in a unique ground-sharing collaboration. This was agreed between both clubs after Magheracloone lost their own pitch in 2018 due to a collapsed gypsum mine underneath. After much development work, Magheracloone resumed playing matches in their new club grounds in August 2022.

== Honours ==
- Louth Junior 2A Football Championship (1): 1964
- Louth Junior Football Championship (1): 2000
- John Roe Cup (1): 2009
- Louth Junior 2B Football Championship (1): 2016
