= Joe Sheridan (Gaelic footballer) =

Irish Gaelic footballer

Personal information
- Native name: Seosamh Ó Sirideáin (Irish)
- Nickname: Big Joe
- Born: County Meath, Ireland
- Height: 6 ft 2 in (188 cm)

Sport
- Sport: Gaelic football
- Position: Forward
Club
- Years: Club
- Seneschalstown
Club titles
- Meath titles: 2
Inter-county
- Years: County
- 2004-2012 2012-2013 2017: Meath
Inter-county titles
- Leinster titles: 1
- NFL: 1

Joe Sheridan is an Irish Gaelic footballer. He plays with the Seneschalstown club and the Meath county team.

He was part of the Meath team that made it to the 2002 All-Ireland Minor Championship Final but lost out to Derry.

He made headlines for scoring a controversial and illegal late goal in the 2010 Leinster Senior Football Championship Final. The goal stood and Meath got a 1-12 to 1-10 win over Louth.

He won Meath Senior Football Championship medals in 2007 and 2009 with Seneschalstown.

In March 2012, Sheridan quit the Meath panel due to work commitments in Boston. A month later it was announced that Sheridan was returning to the Meath panel in time for the championship 2012.

Meath manager Mick O'Dowd axed him at the end of 2013.

In December 2019, he was named as a Meath under-20 county team selector under the management of Ger Robinson.

== Personal life ==
Through his association with Fianna Fáil he has met Elizabeth II and Michelle Obama.

Sheridan supported the No Vote in the 2018 Abortion referendum.

== Honours ==
- 2 O'Byrne Cups (2004, 2006)
- 2 Meath Senior Football Championships (2007, 2009)
- 1 Leinster Senior Football Championship (2010)
- 1 National Football League Division 2 (2007)
