= Stonetown, County Louth =

Rural community in County Louth, Ireland

Stonetown Baile na Cloiche
- Village
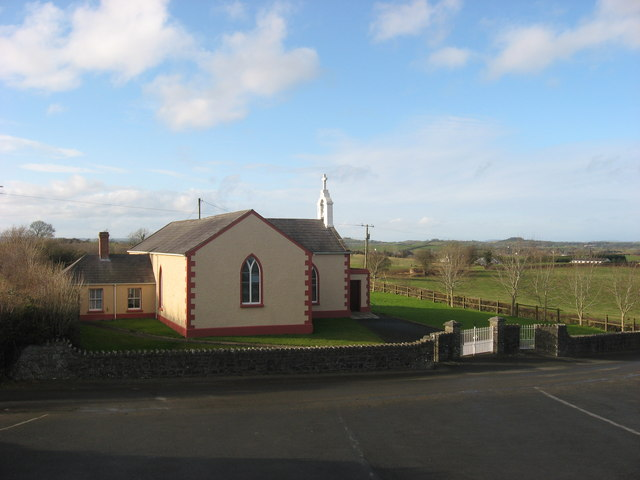
- St. Mary's Roman Catholic Church, Stonetown

- Location in Ireland
- Coordinates: 53°57′52″N 6°36′1″W
- Country: Ireland
- Province: Leinster
- County: County Louth

Government
  - Dáil Éireann: Louth
- Time zone: UTC+0 (WET)
  - Summer (DST): UTC-1 (IST (WEST))
- Area code: 042, +353 42

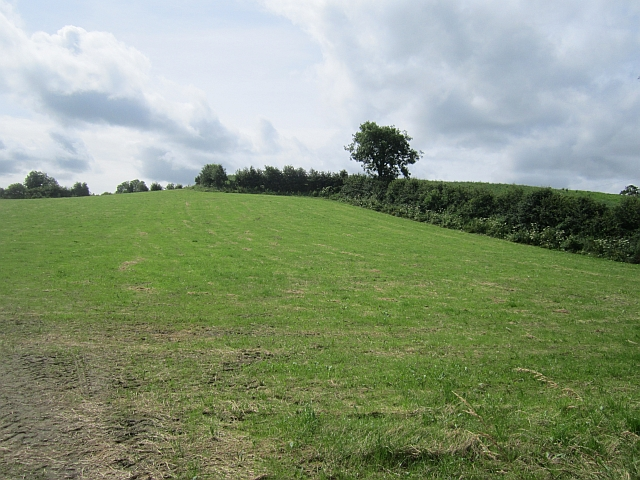
Countryside near Stonetown

Stonetown is a small rural community spanning the townlands of Stonetown Upper (Irish: Baile na Cloiche Uachtarach) and Stonetown Lower (Irish: Baile na Cloiche Íochtarach) in County Louth. It is in the civil parish of Louth, 14 km (9 mi) west of Dundalk, and 7 km (4 mi) east of Carrickmacross. The community consists of a small chapel, a primary school, a football field and a community centre.

== History ==
Stonetown is traditionally associated with the legend of Cúchulainn, the hero of the Táin Bó Cúailnge and son of Lugh who engaged one of Queen Maeve's warriors, Fergus, in battle at Áth dá Ferta in the townland of Oaktate near Stonetown. According to the story, Cúchulainn agreed to make a mock flight from Fergus, in return for a promise that Fergus would fly from him at another time. That promise, redeemed in the last battle, ensured victory for the Ulstermen. The story also tells that Fergus Loingsech from Connaught, and twelve others who sought Queen Maeve's admiration, engaged Cúchulainn in battle in this same location. Cúchulainn struck off their heads, placed twelve stones in the ground and set a head on each stone, hence the name "Stonetown".

Most annals report that Aed Oirdnide Mac Neill, King of Tara, died in 819 at Áth dá Ferta in the territory of Conaille Muirtheimne.

In 1924 a number of pre-historic urns were discovered in the townland of Oaktate (near the claimed site of the battle at Áth dá Ferta). Other sites include holy wells associated with Saint Ultan and Saint Patrick.

== Religion ==
The area's Catholic community is served by Saint Mary's (Our Lady of the Snows) Chapel in Stonetown Upper. The chapel was built by Rev. P Banan in 1837. The plan of the chapel is in the shape of a cross. In 1987 renovation work was completed by P.P Rev. J.Finn and rededicated by Tomas O'Fiach.

In 1816 Patrick Devan, a hedge schoolteacher and the sexton of the chapel held a gathering which culminated in the Wildgoose Lodge Murders. He fled to Dublin, where he was arrested. Despite promises of money and freedom from prosecution, he did not cooperate with the authorities. He pleaded not guilty and conducted his own defence, but was found guilty, hanged and gibbetted.

== Education ==
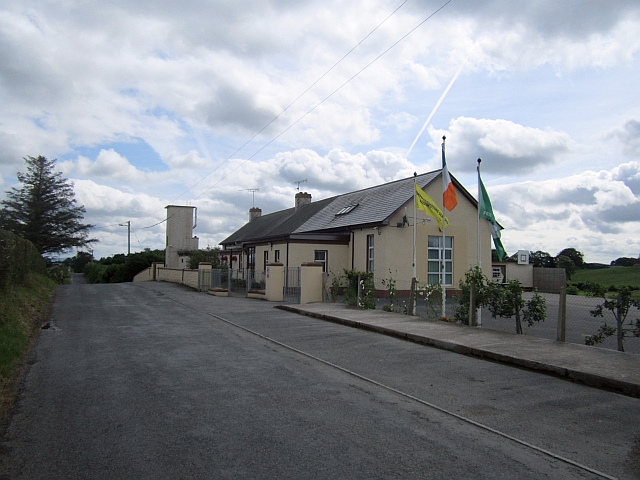
St Oliver's National School

Stonetown's national (primary) school, Saint Oliver's National School, was built in 1952 and is a detached nine-bay single-storey building. It has a pitched slate roof, clay ridge tiles, painted roughcast rendered chimney stacks, smooth rendered corbelled caps, and circular cast-iron downpipes and vent pipes. The school is surrounded by painted stone walls, wrought-iron gates, v-shaped stiles with stone steps. As of early 2020, the school had an enrollment of 26 pupils.

An older school building, which predates Saint Oliver's National School, stands opposite Pairc Annachminnon. Locally known as "Old Stonetown Hall", this building hasn't been in use for many years.

== Sport ==
Stonetown's local Gaelic Athletic Association club is Annaghminnon Rovers GFC. Founded in 1959 in the townland of Annaghminnon, the club football field, dressing rooms and community hall are situated near Stonetown's national school.

== See also ==
- List of towns and villages in Ireland
- Toomes, a nearby townland
