= Coláiste Rís =

School in Dundalk, Ireland

Coordinates: 54.0077°N 6.4008°W

Coláiste

Location
- 74 Chapel St. Dundalk, County Louth; Ireland

Information
- Type: Secondary School
- Religious affiliation: Roman Catholic
- Established: 1869
- Headmaster: Catherine Mulhern
- Vice-Principal: Paula Lavin
- Staff: 40 Approx.
- Gender: Mixed
- Age: 12 to 19
- Enrolment: Boys: 393 Girls: 122
- Colours: White, Blue & Gray
- Sports: GAA, Soccer
- Website: https://www.colaisteris.ie/

Coláiste Rís is a secondary school in Dundalk, County Louth, Ireland. It is named in honour of Edmund Rice, the founder of the Congregation of Christian Brothers.

== Background ==
=== 19th Century ===
Coláiste Rís, formerly Dundalk CBS, was established on 10 May 1869 by the Congregation of Christian Brothers. The first student was John Kelly from Dundalk. The Brotherhood were invited by Archbishop Michael Kieran of Armagh to form a school because, "they gave the best education that has been offered to the youth of Ireland".

=== 20th Century ===
The founder of the school was Brother Louis Yorke, an Englishman born in Manchester into a Protestant family. When he died, in June 1907, the town of Dundalk came to a standstill. The street where the school stands was renamed Yorke Street in his honour, commending his great service to the education of young people in the area.

The first Mathematics teacher was John Philip Holland, notable as the inventor of the submarine. Mr. Holland also served as a teacher in other CBS schools in Ireland.

Within a year of the school opening there were 500 boys enrolled. This required some major extensions, and the development of facilities has continued constantly in the years since then. A recent addition was a Technological Wing built with financial contribution from Senator Edward Haughey, a past pupil.

In 1922, when the Irish Free State was established, the school adopted the ideals of the new state. Students began to study their subjects through Irish in 1925 and in 1934 the school won Corn na Dála, the Dáil Cup, as the best in Ireland for the promotion of Irish culture.

One of the four streams offer subjects through the medium of Irish Gaelic up to Junior Certificate Level but then students have to study through the English language only.

Among other successes in recent years were Irish Senior Golf Champions in 1981, numerous national titles in Debating, 1916 Scholarships, Leinster Senior Football and Young Scientist of the Year.

In 1987, it was found that girls who had been educated through Irish at primary level had no option for secondary education through Irish in Dundalk, it was with this in mind that the first group of 11 girls were enrolled into the school. The first female to appear on the school registers was Aoife Hamill, in September of that year. In the subsequent years the number of female students has grown rapidly, today the ratio is about 2:1, males to females.

On 1 August 1990, the Christian Brothers left Dundalk after 121 years and handed over the school to the Armagh Diocese, with Cardinal Tomás Ó Fiaich as the chief trustee and patron. A new Board of Management had taken over management of the school in 1986 and that same year Mr. Frank Cooney had been installed as the first lay principal. The name was changed to Coláiste Rís, signifying no further association with the Christian Brothers. Before the Brothers left Dundalk, they were honoured in the annual Saint Patrick's Day parade for their contribution to the town.

Main School Entrance

=== 21st Century ===
The new 2000 millennium has seen the school adapt itself to the rapid changes of multi-cultural Ireland. Though the ethos of the school is Christian, students of other religions are welcomed with respect and tolerance.

The school today is a Diocesan college under the trusteeship of the Archdiocese of Armagh, it continues its tradition of focused learning through Irish and English with a flair for Debating and Irish sports.

The school is made up from a mixture of modern buildings as well as the old monastery which is designated as a heritage site, the school grounds have now been fully developed to a point where there is no further space for new buildings. The school playing fields are a short walk away. In 2019 the school celebrated its 150th anniversary.

In May 2010, Kevin Wynne announced he was to step down from his position as head teacher after 9 years. His successor has been named as Pádraig Hamill, who has been a Mathematics and Science teacher at the school for the last three decades.

In 2019, Pádraig Hamill stepped down as head teacher after 9 years. His successor was Noleen Dowling, who had served as its Home Economics teacher and vice principal. John Moylan was named vice principal.

In 2024, Noleen Dowling and John Moylan stepped down, and were replaced by Catherine Mulhern and Paula Lavin as Principal and Vice Principal respectively.

== Extracurricular Activities ==
Many of the school's activities for students and staff are outside normal operating hours, including debating, sports, and science.

The school's debate team has reached the All-Ireland Irish Debating Championship the eleven consecutive years. Seán Ó Coigligh, an Irish teacher in Coláiste Rís, has helped prepare the teams every year.

The school has an accomplished record in the sporting field, especially in Gaelic football and in hurling, as well as soccer.

In science, students from Colaiste Rís have collected a number of awards from the annual Young Scientist Competition, including awards from the Geological Survey of Ireland, the Institute of Physics, the Irish Association of Speech Therapists, and others. One student, Thomas Gernon, won prizes in the years 1997, 1998, 1999 and 2000. In 2000 he was the overall winner of the competition, and became Irish Young Scientist of the Year. He then went to Amsterdam and collected another prize in the pan-European competition.

== Subjects ==
=== Junior Cycle Classes ===
English, Irish, Mathematics, History, Geography, Business Studies, Science, French, German, Spanish, Home Economics, Music, Art, Computers, Woodwork, technical graphics, Religious Studies, Physical Education, C.S.P.E. and S.P.H.E. Students study a total of 14 subjects in a mixture of compulsory and voluntary subjects.

=== Senior Cycle Classes ===
English, Irish, Mathematics, French, German, Spanish, Geography, History, Business, Accountancy, Economics, Chemistry, Physics, Biology Construction Studies, Technical Drawing, Home Economics and Art. Students study at least 7 subjects with four being a choice of the non-compulsory subjects.

== Notable alumni ==
- Séamus Kirk - Ceann Comhairle, Dáil Éireann
- Jim Corr - Musician, The Corrs
- David Keenan - Musician
- Shane Lennon - Gaelic Footballer, Louth
- Eamonn McAuley - Gaelic Footballer, Louth
- Patrick Mc Donnell - Comedian and Actor
- John Moore - Hollywood Director
