= Gerard Monan =

Irish hurler

Personal information
- Native name: Gearóid Mónáin (Irish)
- Born: Ballygalget, County Antrim, Northern Ireland
- Occupation: Farmer

Sport
- Sport: Hurling
Club
- Years: Club
- Ballygalget
Club titles
- Ulster titles: 1
Inter-county
- Years: County
- Down
Inter-county titles
- Ulster titles: 0
- All-Irelands: 0
- NHL: 0
- All Stars: 0

Gerard Monan is an Irish hurler who played for the Down senior hurling team.

Born in Ballygalget, County Down, Monan first played competitive hurling in his youth. He played in different grades at inter-county level with Down, however, he enjoyed little success throughout his career.

At club level Monan is a one-time Ulster medallist with Ballygalget. He has also won several championship medals with the club.

In retirement from playing, Monan became involved in team management and coaching at club and inter-county levels. After a successful spell as manager of Ballygalget, Monan was appointed manager of the Down senior hurling team in 2009. In 2013 they were the winners of the All Ireland Christy Ring Cup, the first and only Down team to lift this trophy.

Sporting positions
Preceded by Jim McKernan	Down Senior Hurling Manager; 2009-present	Incumbent
Achievements
Preceded by Éamonn Phelan (London)	Christy Ring Cup Final winning manager 2013	Incumbent
