= Knockbridge =

Village in County Louth, Ireland

Knockbridge Irish: Droichead an Chnoic
- Village
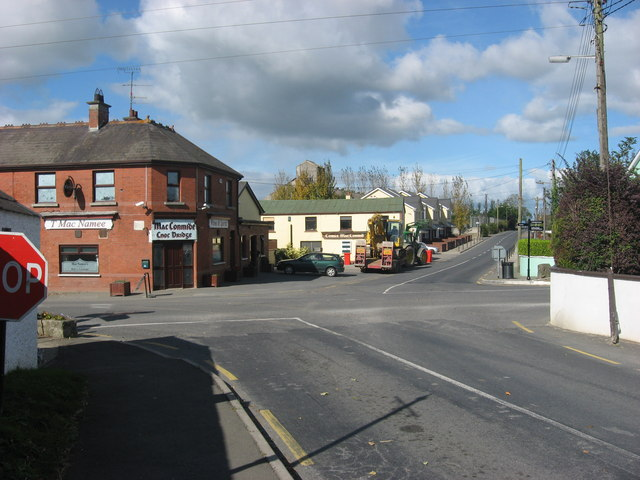
- Knockbridge crossroads

- Location in Ireland
- Coordinates: 53°58′N 6°29′W
- Country: Ireland
- Province: Leinster
- County: Louth
- Elevation: 42 m (138 ft)

Population (2022)
  - Total: 759
- Time zone: UTC+0 (WET)
  - Summer (DST): UTC-1 (IST (WEST))
- Irish Grid Reference: H994037

Knockbridge (Irish: Droichead an Chnoic) is a village in County Louth, Ireland. 7 km south-west of Dundalk, it is in the townland of Ballinlough (Baile an Locha) in the historical barony of Dundalk Upper. As of the 2022 census, the village had a population of 759 people. Knockbridge won a "best kept village" award in the 2008 Tidy Towns competition.

== Facilities ==
The village is centred on a crossroads, where there is a pub and a shop. There are four housing estates, a Roman Catholic church and a large primary school in the village.

Stephenstown House, a large ruined Georgian house, once owned by a branch of the Fortescue family, stands beside the River Fane about a mile outside the village. Stephenstown Pond, about a hundred metres from the house, was redeveloped in the mid-1990s and is a public amenity. Stephenstown Pond has a conference centre and community enterprise space.

Knockbridge Church (St Mary's) has a number of Harry Clarke designed stained-glass windows.

== History ==
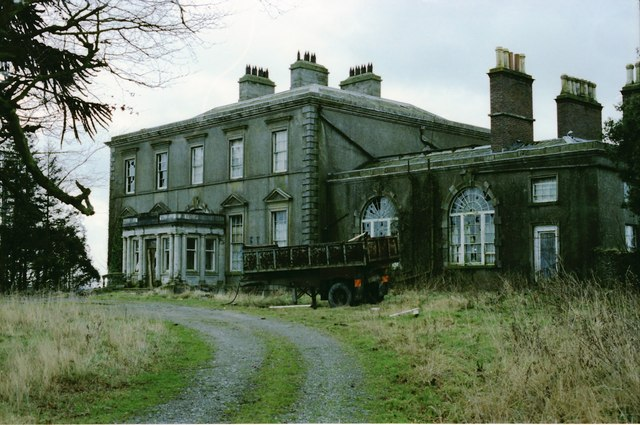
Stephenstown House, Knockbridge

Historical population
Year	Pop.	±%
1986	309	—
1991	292	−5.5%
1996	274	−6.2%
2002	335	+22.3%
2006	427	+27.5%
2011	583	+36.5%
2016	667	+14.4%
2022	759	+13.8%

The village may take its name from "Cnoic Bhríde" - Bridget's Hill - reputed to be a site connected with local Saint Bridget. It may also take its name from "Droichead an Chnoic" - Bridge of the hill - after a bridge over the nearby River Fane.

Clochafarmore, where the legendary hero Cú Chulainn is reputed to have died, is also nearby.

== Sport ==
The village's Gaelic football team, St Bride's GFC, was founded by Séamus Quinn, the parish priest in 1927. The club plays in Páirc an Chuinnigh, which was bought as a memorial to Quinn who died in 1952. The grounds were opened on 1 May 1955. The club competes in the Louth Senior Division.

The local hurling club, Knockbridge GAA, has won the Louth Senior Hurling Championship twelve times.

== Location and transport ==
The village is situated 6.5 km (4.0 mi) south-west of Dundalk, the county town. The village is 75 km north of Dublin Airport. Bus Éireann provides bus routes to and from Knockbridge.

== See also ==
- List of towns and villages in Ireland
