= Peadar Byrne =

Irish Gaelic footballer

Personal information
- Native name: Peadar Ó Broin (Irish)
- Born: County Meath, Ireland

Sport
- Sport: Gaelic football
- Position: Right Half Forward
Club
- Years: Club
- Ballinlough
Club titles
- Meath titles: 8
- Leinster titles: 1
Inter-county
- Years: County
- 2005-2013: Meath
Inter-county titles
- Leinster titles: 1

Peadar Byrne is an Irish Gaelic footballer who played for the Meath county team after making his senior debut in 2005.

Byrne received a suspension of four weeks in 2008 after being involved in a clash during the final round of the league against Dublin.

He was a member of the Meath squad that won the 2010 Leinster Senior Football Championship, coming on in that year's final as a second-half substitute. Byrne, who played club hurling with Kilskyre, was suspended in 2010 following an incident following a junior hurling championship game. He returned to the Meath senior football squad, after serving a 9-month suspension, in June 2011.

Byrne played for Meath during 2013, but was "cut from the Meath panel" ahead of the 2014 season.

He helped his club, Ballinlough GFC, win the 2014 Meath Intermediate Football Championship.
