= Louth Senior Hurling Championship =

- Current season or competition: 2026 Louth Senior Hurling Championship
- Code: Hurling
- Region: Louth (GAA)
- Trophy: Paddy Kelly Cup
- No. of teams: 3
- Title holders: St Fechin's (7th title)
- Most titles: Naomh Moninne (23 titles)

The Louth Senior Hurling Championship is an annual Gaelic Athletic Association competition organised by Louth GAA among the top hurling clubs in County Louth, Ireland. The winner qualifies to represent the county in the Leinster Junior Club Hurling Championship, the winner of which progresses to the All-Ireland Junior Club Hurling Championship.

St Fechin's are the title holders, defeating Naomh Moninne by 2-18 to 2-16 in the 2026 final.

== History ==
The competition was run as a Junior Championship between 1902 and 1986, and became a senior championship in 1987. The Paddy Kelly Cup, named in honour of a deceased Drogheda gael, was presented for the first time that year to the Naomh Moninne captain Brian Brady.

== Qualification for subsequent competitions ==
At the end of the championship, the winning team qualify to the subsequent Leinster Junior Club Hurling Championship.

== Teams ==
=== 2026 teams ===
The 3 teams competing in the 2026 Louth Senior Hurling Championship were:

Team	Location	Colours	Position in 2026	Titles	Last title
Knockbridge	Knockbridge	Red and white	Group Stage	12	2020
Naomh Moninne	Dundalk	Black and amber	Runners-up	23	2025
St Fechin's	Termonfeckin	Green and white	Champions	7	2026

== Roll of honour ==
=== By club ===
#	Club	Wins	Years won
1	Naomh Moninne	23	1964, 1965, 1973, 1974, 1976, 1978, 1982, 1983, 1984, 1985, 1986, 1987, 1989, 1992, 1993, 1995, 1997, 1998, 1999, 2010, 2017, 2019, 2025
2	Knockbridge	12	2000, 2001, 2003, 2005, 2006, 2007, 2008, 2009, 2011, 2014, 2018, 2020
3	Naomh Colmcille (Ardee)	8	1955, 1958, 1960, 1962, 1963, 1966, 1971, 1975
4	Wolfe Tones (Drogheda)	7	1954, 1959, 1988, 1990, 1991, 1994, 1996
4	St Fechin's	7	2015, 2016, 2021, 2022, 2023, 2024, 2026
6	Pearse Óg	4	2002, 2004, 2012, 2013
7	Erin's Own (Dundalk)	3	1951, 1952, 1953
7	Clan na Gael	3	1967, 1970, 1972
9	Cúchulainns (Dundalk)	2	1956, 1957
9	Na Piarsaigh (Drogheda)	2	1968, 1969

== List of finals ==
=== Legend ===
- Gold – Leinster junior club champions
- Silver – Leinster junior club runners-up

(R) = Replay

=== List of Louth SHC finals ===
Year	Winner		Opponent	
Year	Club	Score	Club	Score
1941–1950	No Championship			
1951	Erin's Own (Dundalk)			
1952	Erin's Own (Dundalk)			
1953	Erin's Own (Dundalk)			
1954	Wolfe Tones			
1955	Naomh Colmcille (Ardee)			
1956	Cúchulainns (Dundalk)			
1957	Cúchulainns (Dundalk)		Erin's Own (Dundalk)	
1958	Naomh Colmcille (Ardee)			
1959	Wolfe Tones			
1960	Naomh Colmcille (Ardee)			
1961	Wolfe Tones		Erin's Own (Dundalk)	
1962	Naomh Colmcille (Ardee)			
1963	Naomh Colmcille (Ardee)			
1964	Naomh Moninne			
1965	Naomh Moninne			
1966	Naomh Colmcille (Ardee)			
1967	Clan na Gael			
1968	Na Piarsaigh (Drogheda)			
1969	Na Piarsaigh (Drogheda)			
1970	Clan na Gael			
1971	Naomh Colmcille (Ardee)			
1972	Clan na Gael			
1973	Naomh Moninne			
1974	Naomh Moninne			
1975	Naomh Colmcille (Ardee)			
1976	Naomh Moninne			
1977	Null & Void			
1978	Naomh Moninne			
1979–1981	No Championship			
1982	Naomh Moninne			
1983	Naomh Moninne			
1984	Naomh Moninne			
1985	Naomh Moninne			
1986	Naomh Moninne			
1987	Naomh Moninne	3-10 (R)	Wolfe Tones	3-01 (R)
1988	Wolfe Tones	3-08	Naomh Moninne	3-04
1989	Naomh Moninne	4-08	Wolfe Tones	2-08
1990	Wolfe Tones	4-11	Naomh Moninne	2-07
1991	Wolfe Tones	3-09	Naomh Moninne	0-09
1992	Naomh Moninne	1-14	Wolfe Tones	2-04
1993	Naomh Moninne	3-08 (R)	Wolfe Tones	2-08 (R)
1994	Wolfe Tones	1-11	Pearse Óg	0-07
1995	Naomh Moninne	2-10	Wolfe Tones	0-10
1996	Wolfe Tones	2-13	Naomh Moninne	2-07
1997	Naomh Moninne	1-18	Pearse Óg	1-07
1998	Naomh Moninne	3-15	Wolfe Tones	1-14
1999	Naomh Moninne	0-13	Wolfe Tones	0-10
2000	Knockbridge	0-16	Wolfe Tones	1-06
2001	Knockbridge	0-17	Wolfe Tones	2-06
2002	Pearse Óg	3-11	Knockbridge	1-09
2003	Knockbridge	0-11	Wolfe Tones	0-05
2004	Pearse Óg	1-11	Naomh Moninne	1-06
2005	Knockbridge	2-09	Pearse Óg	0-08
2006	Knockbridge	1-14	Pearse Óg	2-08
2007	Knockbridge	1-13	Pearse Óg	0-15
2008	Knockbridge	2-12	Pearse Óg	0-09
2009	Knockbridge	2-13	Pearse Óg	0-09
2010	Naomh Moninne	1-11	Knockbridge	0-11
2011	Knockbridge	3-16	Mattock Rangers	0-10
2012	Pearse Óg	2-14	Knockbridge	2-07
2013	Pearse Óg	2-09	Knockbridge	1-07
2014	Knockbridge	1-15	Pearse Óg	1-08
2015	St Fechin's	2-20	Pearse Óg	3-11
2016	St Fechin's	4-14	Knockbridge	0-12
2017	Naomh Moninne	0-16	St Fechin's	0-14
2018	Knockbridge	4-12	St Fechin's	1-09
2019	Naomh Moninne	1-13	St Fechin's	0-14
2020	Knockbridge	3-16	St Fechin's	2-14
2021	St Fechin's	0-18	Knockbridge	1-12
2022	St Fechin's	2-16	Knockbridge	2-09
2023	St Fechin's	3-20	Naomh Moninne	1-14
2024	St Fechin's	1-17	Knockbridge	1-10
2025	Naomh Moninne	3-15	St Fechin's	3-14
2026	St Fechin's	2-18	Naomh Moninne	2-16

== See also ==
- Louth Senior Football Championship
- Leinster Junior Club Hurling Championship
