= Peter Fitzpatrick =

Irish former politician and sportsman (born 1962)

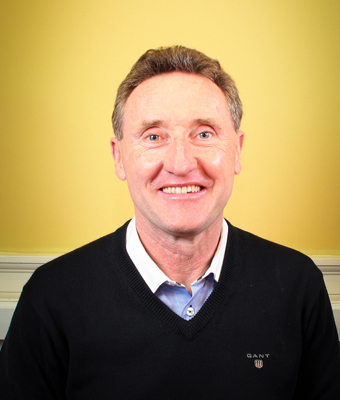
- Fitzpatrick in 2016

Teachta Dála
- In office February 2011 – November 2024
- Constituency: Louth

Personal details
- Born: 11 May 1962 (age 64) Dundalk, County Louth, Ireland
- Party: Independent (since 2018)
- Other political affiliations: Fine Gael (2011–2018)

Military service
- Allegiance: Ireland
- Branch/service: Army
- Years of service: 1987–1990
- Unit: 27 Infantry Battalion
- Gaelic games career
- Height: 6 ft 0 in (183 cm)
- Sport: Gaelic football
- Position: Left half-Back
Club
- Years: Club
- Clan na Gael
Inter-county
- Years: County
- 1980–1995: Louth
Inter-county titles
- Leinster titles: 0
- All Stars: 0
Inter-county management
- Years: Team
- 2009–2012: Louth

Peter Fitzpatrick (born 11 May 1962) is an Irish former independent and Fine Gael politician who served as a Teachta Dála (TD) for the Louth constituency from 2011 to 2024.

He was a former soldier in the 27 Infantry Battalion and also a former manager of the Louth county football team.

== Sporting career ==
A member of the Clan na Gael GAA club in Dundalk, Fitzpatrick won a Leinster Under-21 championship medal with Louth in 1981. He had a successful club career with Clan na Gael, winning five Louth SFC titles, nine Senior Football Leagues and six ACC Cup medals. He was also a member of the Dundalk F.C. reserve side that won the 1982–1983 League of Ireland B Division.

Fitzpatrick was appointed the manager of Louth in November 2009, succeeding Eamonn McEneaney, the former Monaghan footballer and manager. In his first season in charge of Louth, the team reached their first Leinster final in 50 years. The 2010 Leinster Senior Football Championship Final saw them compete against Meath. Louth almost won but for a controversial goal by Joe Sheridan late in the game. Louth subsequently entered the 2010 All-Ireland Senior Football Championship through the "back door". However, the team lost heavily to Dublin in their next game, thus ending the county's 2010 championship season.

In the 2011 season, Louth qualified for the Division 3 League Final where they faced Westmeath. Louth won on a scoreline of 1–15 to 0–13.

Fitzpatrick quit in 2012 after three years. He went on to become the chairperson of the Louth County Board, and was in this role when Mickey Harte was appointed Louth manager in 2020, also with the successful application for planning for a new stadium for Louth GAA.

== Political career ==
Fitzpatrick allowed his name to go forward for a nomination for Fine Gael ahead of the 2011 general election. He was elected as a Fine Gael TD for Louth. In Dáil Éireann, he sat on the Committee for Transport, Tourism and Sport, and previously on the Health committee.

He opposed the legalisation of abortion in Ireland, calling for a "No" vote in the 2018 abortion referendum. In August 2018, he announced that he would not contest the next general election for Fine Gael. In October 2018, he announced he would seek re-election as an independent and resigned from Fine Gael.

Fitzpatrick was elected as an independent candidate for Louth at the 2020 general election. At the time he was the first independent to be elected for the constituency since James Coburn (later of Fine Gael) at the 1932 general election, although Coburn was elected for the National League.

On 30 August 2024, Fitzpatrick announced that he would not contest the next general election.

Sporting positions
Preceded by Eugene Judge	Louth Senior Football Captain; 1988	Succeeded by Richie Culhane
Preceded by David Reilly	Louth Senior Football Captain; 1994	Succeeded by Stephen Melia
Preceded by Eamonn McEneaney	Louth Senior Football Manager; 2009–2012	Succeeded by Aidan O'Rourke
Preceded by Des Halpenny	Louth County Board Chairman; 2020–2023	Succeeded by Seán McClean

Dáil	Election	Deputy (Party)	Deputy (Party)	Deputy (Party)	Deputy (Party)	Deputy (Party)
4th	1923	Frank Aiken (Rep)	Peter Hughes (CnaG)	James Murphy (CnaG)	3 seats until 1977	
5th	1927 (Jun)	Frank Aiken (FF)	James Coburn (NL)	James Murphy (CnaG)	3 seats until 1977	
6th	1927 (Sep)	Frank Aiken (FF)	James Coburn (NL)	James Murphy (CnaG)	3 seats until 1977	
7th	1932	Frank Aiken (FF)	James Coburn (Ind.)	James Murphy (CnaG)	3 seats until 1977	
8th	1933	Frank Aiken (FF)	James Coburn (Ind.)	James Murphy (CnaG)	3 seats until 1977	
9th	1937	Frank Aiken (FF)	James Coburn (FG)	Laurence Walsh (FF)	3 seats until 1977	
10th	1938	Frank Aiken (FF)	James Coburn (FG)	Laurence Walsh (FF)	3 seats until 1977	
11th	1943	Frank Aiken (FF)	James Coburn (FG)	Roddy Connolly (Lab)	3 seats until 1977	
12th	1944	Frank Aiken (FF)	James Coburn (FG)	Laurence Walsh (FF)	3 seats until 1977	
13th	1948	Frank Aiken (FF)	James Coburn (FG)	Roddy Connolly (Lab)	3 seats until 1977	
14th	1951	Frank Aiken (FF)	James Coburn (FG)	Laurence Walsh (FF)	3 seats until 1977	
14th	1954 by-election	Frank Aiken (FF)	George Coburn (FG)	Laurence Walsh (FF)	3 seats until 1977	
15th	1954	Frank Aiken (FF)	George Coburn (FG)	Paddy Donegan (FG)	3 seats until 1977	
16th	1957	Frank Aiken (FF)	George Coburn (FG)	Pádraig Faulkner (Note: Faulker served as Ceann Comhairle in the 21st Dáil from 1977 to 1981, and was returned automatically at the 1981 election.) (FF)	3 seats until 1977	
17th	1961	Frank Aiken (FF)	Paddy Donegan (FG)	Pádraig Faulkner (FF)	3 seats until 1977	
18th	1965	Frank Aiken (FF)	Paddy Donegan (FG)	Pádraig Faulkner (FF)	3 seats until 1977	
19th	1969	Frank Aiken (FF)	Paddy Donegan (FG)	Pádraig Faulkner (FF)	3 seats until 1977	
20th	1973	Joseph Farrell (FF)	Paddy Donegan (FG)	Pádraig Faulkner (FF)	3 seats until 1977	
21st	1977	Joseph Farrell (FF)	Paddy Donegan (FG)	Pádraig Faulkner (FF)	Eddie Filgate (FF)	4 seats 1977–2011
22nd	1981	Paddy Agnew (AHB)	Bernard Markey (FG)	Pádraig Faulkner (FF)	Eddie Filgate (FF)	4 seats 1977–2011
23rd	1982 (Feb)	Thomas Bellew (FF)	Bernard Markey (FG)	Pádraig Faulkner (FF)	Eddie Filgate (FF)	4 seats 1977–2011
24th	1982 (Nov)	Michael Bell (Lab)	Brendan McGahon (FG)	Pádraig Faulkner (FF)	Séamus Kirk (Note: Kirk served as Ceann Comhairle in the 30th Dáil from 2009 to 2011, and was returned automatically at the 2011 election.) (FF)	4 seats 1977–2011
25th	1987	Michael Bell (Lab)	Brendan McGahon (FG)	Dermot Ahern (FF)	Séamus Kirk (FF)	4 seats 1977–2011
26th	1989	Michael Bell (Lab)	Brendan McGahon (FG)	Dermot Ahern (FF)	Séamus Kirk (FF)	4 seats 1977–2011
27th	1992	Michael Bell (Lab)	Brendan McGahon (FG)	Dermot Ahern (FF)	Séamus Kirk (FF)	4 seats 1977–2011
28th	1997	Michael Bell (Lab)	Brendan McGahon (FG)	Dermot Ahern (FF)	Séamus Kirk (FF)	4 seats 1977–2011
29th	2002	Arthur Morgan (SF)	Fergus O'Dowd (FG)	Dermot Ahern (FF)	Séamus Kirk (FF)	4 seats 1977–2011
30th	2007	Arthur Morgan (SF)	Fergus O'Dowd (FG)	Dermot Ahern (FF)	Séamus Kirk (FF)	4 seats 1977–2011
31st	2011	Gerry Adams (SF)	Fergus O'Dowd (FG)	Ged Nash (Lab)	Séamus Kirk (FF)	Peter Fitzpatrick (FG)
32nd	2016	Gerry Adams (SF)	Fergus O'Dowd (FG)	Declan Breathnach (FF)	Imelda Munster (SF)	Peter Fitzpatrick (FG)
33rd	2020	Ruairí Ó Murchú (SF)	Fergus O'Dowd (FG)	Ged Nash (Lab)	Imelda Munster (SF)	Peter Fitzpatrick (Ind.)
34th	2024	Ruairí Ó Murchú (SF)	Paula Butterly (FG)	Ged Nash (Lab)	Joanna Byrne (SF)	Erin McGreehan (FF)
