= Tommy Harrell =

British hurling manager

- Occupation: Hurling manager

Tommy Harrell is the current manager of the London senior hurling team.

== See also ==
- Gaelic games
- List of hurling managers
