= Brian Meade =

Irish Gaelic footballer

Personal information
- Native name: Briain Ó Miach (Irish)
- Born: Rathkenny, Ireland

Sport
- Sport: Gaelic Football
- Position: Midfield
Club
- Years: Club
- Rathkenny
Inter-county
- Years: County
- 2007-2014: Meath
Inter-county titles
- Leinster titles: 1

Brian Meade is a Gaelic footballer who plays for the Meath county team.

Meade plays for Midfield position his local club Rathkenny and for Meath senior team since being called up in 2007 by former footballer and manager Colm Coyle.
