= Caoimhín King =

Meath Gaelic footballer

Personal information
- Native name: Caoimhín Ó Cionga (Irish)
- Born: Dunshaughlin, County Meath

Sport
- Sport: Gaelic football
Club
- Years: Club
- ?–: Dunshaughlin
Inter-county
- Years: County
- 2005–: Meath
Inter-county titles
- Leinster titles: 1

Caoimhín King is an Irish Gaelic footballer who plays for the Dunshaughlin club, and, since 2005, has been a senior member of the Meath county squad.
