= Mark Ward (Gaelic footballer) =

Irish Gaelic footballer

Personal information
- Native name: Marcas Mac an Bhaird (Irish)
- Nickname: Wardy
- Born: 15 March 1985 (age 41) Navan, County Meath, Ireland

Sport
- Sport: Gaelic football
- Position: Midfield
Club
- Years: Club
- Navan O'Mahonys
Inter-county
Years	County	Apps (scores)
2002 onwards	Meath	48 (0-15)
Inter-county titles
- All Stars: o

Mark Ward is a football player from Ireland. As of 2009, he played with Navan O'Mahonys. He holds a county medal which he won playing Sigerson football for University College Dublin. He has been a member of the senior Meath county football team.
