= Michael Walsh (London hurler) =

Irish hurler

Personal information
- Native name: Mícheál Breathnach (Irish)
- Born: 1986 (age 39–40) Kildorrery, County Cork, Ireland
- Occupation: Teacher

Sport
- Sport: Hurling
- Position: Left wing-back
Clubs
- Years: Club
- Kildorrery; Robert Emmett's
Club titles
- London titles: 1
Inter-county
- Years: County
- 2011 2011-present: Cork; London
Inter-county titles
- Leinster titles: 0
- All-Irelands: 0
- NHL: 0
- All Stars: 0

Michael Walsh (born 1986) is an Irish hurler who currently plays as a left wing-back for the London senior hurling team.

== Career ==
=== Inter-county ===
Walsh began his inter-county career as a member of the Cork senior hurling team. After emigrating from Ireland he subsequently linked up with the London senior hurling team. As an inter-county hurler he has won one Christy Ring Cup winners' medal and one Nicky Rackard Cup winners' medal.

=== Club ===
At club level Walsh is a one-time county club championship medalist with the Robert Emmett's club. He currently plays with Kildorrery in Cork.
