= St Fechin's GAA =

Louth-based Gaelic games club

St Fechin's
- Naomh Feichín CLG
- Founded: 1941
- County: Louth
- Colours: Green and White
- Grounds: Páirc Naomh Feichín
- Coordinates: 53.73602°N 6.30276°W

Playing kits
Standard colours

Senior Club Championships
	All Ireland	Leinster champions	Louth champions
Football:	-	-	2
Hurling:	-	-	7
Ladies' football:	–	1	1

St Fechin's GAA is a Gaelic Athletic Association (GAA) club that fields teams in competitions organised by Louth GAA. It is located in the seaside village of Termonfeckin, part of Beaulieu parish.

Former Louth county footballer Fr Shane Cullen helped found the club in 1941.

Paddy McGlew, who played football with the club, was Chairman of Louth GAA from 1988 to 1991.

In the late 1990s St Fechin's purchased a 27-acre site at Beaulieu, which would become their new home. The official opening was performed by then GAA president Seán Kelly in August 2003. The site at Beaulieu has 3 GAA pitches and two small Astro turf pitches. In 2020 the club opened a new community centre which has multiple meeting rooms, a hall, remote working area and a kitchen.

Clogherhead club Dreadnots are the clubs local rivals and Knockbridge GAA are the clubs biggest rivals in hurling.

In 2025 the Senior Ladies team created history by achieving the clubs first ever provincial title in any code when they defeat Balyna of Kildare in the Leinster Intermediate Club Championship Final.

== Football ==
As of 2026, the club competes in the Louth Senior Championship and Division 2 of the county football Leagues. Paul Clarke is the manager of the senior team.

=== Honours ===
- Louth Senior Football Championship (2): 1983, 1984
- Cardinal O'Donnell Cup (1): 1985
- ACC Cup (3): 1980, 1989, 1990
- Louth Intermediate Football Championship (1): 2021
- Louth Intermediate Football League (2): 2014, 2019
- Dealgan Milk Products/Paddy Sheelan Shield (2): 1998, 2018
- Louth Junior Football Championship (3): 1965, 1976, 2011
- Louth Junior A Football League (3): 1975, 1979, 2010
- Kevin Mullen Shield (1): 2010
- Louth Junior 2A Football Championship (2): 1961, 1978
- Louth Junior 2A Football League (1): 1956, 1957, 1958
- Louth Junior 2 Football League (Division 4B) (2): 1998, 2010
- Louth Junior 2 Football League (Division 4C) (1): 2008
- Louth Under-21 Football Championship (4): ‡ 1976, ‡ 1977, ‡ 2008, 2021
- Louth Minor Football League (1): ‡ 2006
- Louth Minor B Football Championship (1): 2010

‡ Shared with Dreadnots

=== Inter-county players ===
St Fechin's players who have represented Louth at inter-county level include:

- John Crosbie
- John Maguire
- Paddy McGlew
- Patrick Duff
- Matt McDermott
- Johnny McDonnell
- Frank Brannigan
- Ronan Holcroft
- Bevan Duffy
- David Collier
- Eoghan Duffy
- Paul Matthews
- Niall McDonnell

== Ladies Football ==
While the main St Fechin's GAA club was founded in 1941, the ladies' section was founded in 1994. The team grew out of a novelty challenge match held during the club's jubilee year. The late Marie Fanning is credited with the drive to get the team up and running, with Joe Sheridan serving as the first manager when the team entered competitive play.

After a number of lean years the first green shoots appeared in the early 2000's with a number of final appearances and eventual success in 2003 when they won the Louth Junior Championship and followed that up with an Intermediate Championship the following year.

It wasn't until 2010's that sustained success occurred when a big push at underage level seen a number of new and talented players come through and a rise from the Junior ranks to eventually claiming the Louth Senior Championship in 2025 and then following up with a historic Leinster Championship win a month later.

=== Honours ===
- Leinster Ladies Intermediate Football Club Championship (1): 2025
- Louth Ladies Senior Football Championship (1): 2025
- Louth Ladies Intermediate Football Championship (2): 2004 2018
- Louth Ladies Junior Football Championship (2): 2003 2015
- Louth Ladies Division 1 Champions (1): 2022
- Louth Ladies Division 2 Champions (2): 2016, 2024
- Louth Ladies Minor Championship (1): 2015

== Hurling ==
The club started juvenile Hurling in 1997 and entered a team in the Louth Senior Hurling Championship for the first time in 2003. In 2015, St Fechin's became county champions for the first time after defeating Pearse Óg in the final at Páirc Uí Mhuirí.

=== Honours ===
- Louth Senior Hurling Championship (7): 2015, 2016, 2021, 2022, 2023, 2024, 2026
- Louth Senior Hurling League (4): 2013, 2016, 2020, 2022 2024
