= London county hurling team =

Hurling team representing County London

London
- Sport: Hurling
- Irish: Londain
- Nickname(s): The Exiles
- County board: London GAA
- Manager: Eoin O'Neill
- Captain: Sean Glynn
- Home venue(s): McGovern Park

Recent competitive record
- Last championship title: 1901
- Current NHL Division: 2 (1st in 2025 Division 3)
- Last league title: None
First colours	Second colours

The London county hurling team represents London in hurling and is governed by London GAA, the county board of the Gaelic Athletic Association. The team competes in the Joe McDonagh Cup and the National Hurling League. It formerly competed in the Ulster and Leinster Senior Hurling Championships.

London's home ground is McGovern Park in South Ruislip. The team's manager is Eoin O'Neill.

The team last won the All-Ireland Senior Championship in 1901 but has never won the National League.

== History ==
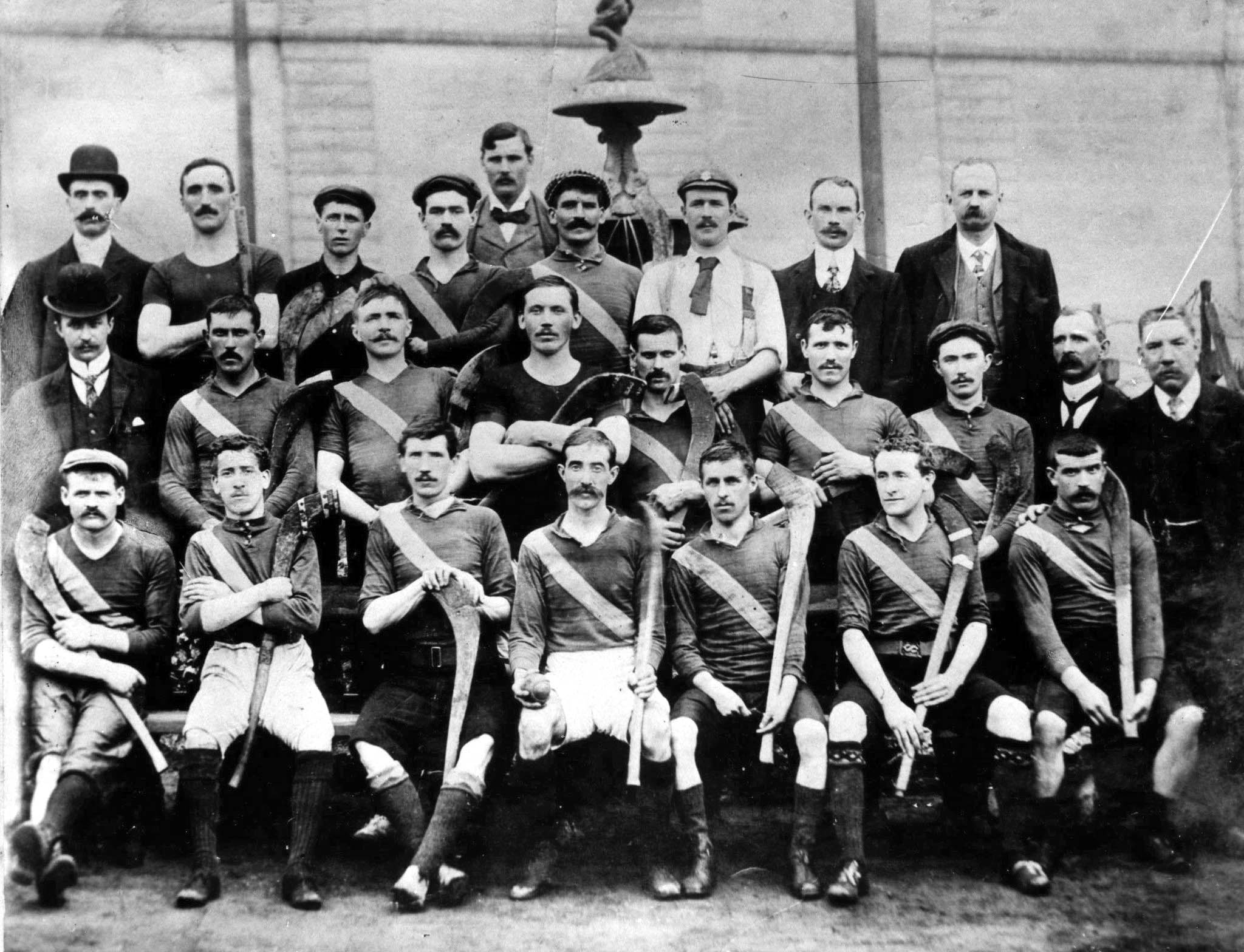
1901 London team, All-Ireland champions

London has a strong hurling tradition. It has consistently achieved good results in the National Hurling League. As a mid-table Division 2 side, London ranks above half of Ireland’s counties, in strong contrast to the county's weaker performances in Gaelic football (see London's record in football).

The county won the 1901 All-Ireland Senior Hurling Championship (SHC).

In the 1973 All-Ireland SHC, a London team that included six Galwaymen defeated Galway by a scoreline of 4–7 to 3–5 in the All-Ireland SHC quarter-final at Ballinasloe. Galwaymen Frank Canning and Lennie Burke scored three of the goals against their old county.

London won five All-Ireland B Championships between 1985 and 1995.

London won the inaugural Nicky Rackard Cup in 2005, defeating Louth's hurlers by 15 points in the final.

London defeated Derry in the 2010 Ulster Senior Hurling Championship quarter-final at Casement Park to qualify for a semi-final against Down.

London won the 2011 Nicky Rackard Cup, defeating Louth in the final.

London won the 2012 Christy Ring Cup, defeating Wicklow by a scoreline of 4–18 to 1–17. This gained the county promotion to the 2013 All-Ireland SHC, facing Carlow in its opening match. It then lost to Westmeath in an All-Ireland SHC qualifier.

In the 2014 All-Ireland SHC, London finished bottom of the preliminary group after being beaten by Westmeath in the final game of the round robin stage in Mullingar, and the county was relegated back to the Christy Ring Cup for the 2015 season.

London finished runner-up in the 2018 Christy Ring Cup.

Although the footballers withdrew due to the UK's 2001 foot-and-mouth outbreak, the hurlers stayed in the championship that year, but all withdrew from the 2020 and 2021 championships due to the impact of the COVID-19 pandemic on Gaelic games.

== Panel ==
The following players were selected as part of the senior hurling panel for London's Joe McDonagh Cup match against Laois on 24th May 2026:

No.	Player	Position	Club
1	Mark Kilgannon		Brothers Pearse
2	Barry Morrissey		Sean Treacys
3	Adam Cunney		Brothers Pearse
4	Niall Fitzgerald		Kilburn Gaels
5	Jack Loughnane		Thomas McCurtains
6	Jack Morrissey		St Gabriels
7	Stephen Whelan		St Gabriels
8	Rory Lodge		St Gabriels
9	Fionn Whelan		St Gabriels
10	Noah Quinlan		Brothers Pearse
11	Ronan McGrady		Robert Emmetts
12	Conor Byrne		Kilburn Gaels
13	Dylan Dawson		Robert Emmetts
14	Paul Kennedy		Brothers Pearse
15	Tom Hanifin		Thomas McCurtains

No.	Player	Position	Club
16	Padraig Collins		St Gabriels
17	Evan Kelly		Kilburn Gaels
18	Eoin McGrath		Sean Treacys
19	Ben Herlihy		St Gabriels
20	Donnacha Leahy		Robert Emmetts
21	Tom O'Regan		Brothers Pearse
22	Philip Lavin		Robert Emmetts
23	David Devine		Kilburn Gaels
24	Niall Eames		St Gabriels
25	Denis O'Farrell		Brothers Pearse
26	Orann Donnelly		Robert Emmetts
27	Niall Cannon		St Gabriels
28	Michael Moran		Sean Treacys

== Managerial history ==
- Eamonn Phelan: played until 2010, manager for 2011 final, 2012 final (see sources concerning those games)
- Fergus McMahon (Meath): four years, until 2018
- Shane Kelly (Galway and Brothers Pearse): 2018–2019
- Kevin McMullan (Antrim and Robert Emmetts): 2019–2023
- Neil Rogers (Birr and St Gabriel's): 2023–2025
- Eoin O'Neill: 2026

== Honours ==
- All-Ireland Senior Hurling Championship
  - (gold) Winners (1): 1901
  - (silver) Runners-up (3): 1900, 1902, 1903
- All-Ireland Senior B Hurling Championship
  - (gold) Winners (5): 1985, 1987, 1988, 1990, 1995
  - (silver) Runners-up (15):
- All-Ireland Junior Hurling Championship
  - (gold) Winners (5): 1938, 1949, 1959, 1960, 1963
- Christy Ring Cup
  - (gold) Winners (2): 2012, 2025
  - (silver) Runners-up (1): 2018
- Nicky Rackard Cup
  - (gold) Winners (2): 2005, 2011
  - (silver) Runners-up (2): 2009, 2010
- Kehoe Cup
  - (gold) Winners (2): 1987, 1988
  - (silver) Runners-up (2): 1983, 2003
