= Naomh Moninne H.C. =

Louth-based Gaelic games club

Naomh Moninne
- Founded: 1959
- County: Louth
- Nickname: Moninne
- Colours: Black and amber
- Grounds: Old Bridge Estate, Toberona, Fatima.

Playing kits
Standard colours

Senior Club Championships
	All Ireland	Leinster champions	Louth champions
Hurling:	0	0	22

Naomh Moninne Hurling Club is a Gaelic Athletic Association (GAA) club based in Dundalk, County Louth, Ireland. The club was founded in 1959 and is exclusively concerned with the game of hurling. Naomh Moninne has the distinction of being the first club to represent Louth in the Leinster Senior Club Hurling Championship and is recognised for founding the All-Ireland Poc Fada Championship, a national annual GAA event.

Naomh Moninne compete in the Louth Senior Hurling Championship and are the most successful hurling club in Louth, having won a record 22 championship titles. The club last won the championship in 2019 when they beat St. Fechin's in the final by 0–16 to 0–14.

== History ==
=== Beginnings (1959–1960) ===
Naomh Moninne Hurling Club started as a youth club, ‘Cumann Ógra Naomh Moninne’, in the Castletown area of Faughart in 1959. It was there that local priest, Father Pól Mac Sheáin but more commonly referred to in Irish as ‘an tAthair Pól Mac Sheáin’, set up the first underage hurling team. Most of the young hurlers were from the Fatima estate in Castletown. Fr Mac Sheáin was originally from County Armagh and was not just a hurling enthusiast, but also an advocate of the Irish language and culture. He named the club after St Moninne, a local saint who founded a convent in Faughart during the 5th century. The clubs first set of jerseys were obtained from a local club called Mount Rovers and had black and amber stripes. Naomh Moninne adopted these as their official colours and still use them to this day.

The club first played on a small strip of land at Toberona corner known as ‘Hoey's Plot’. As the game grew in popularity, the necessity arose for a larger playing field. Fr Mac Sheáin was successful in obtaining permission from the then town clerk to use a piece of land at the back of Fatima known as ‘The Meadows’, commonly referred to in Irish as ‘The Bainseach’. Two railway carriages were obtained for use as changing rooms while the ESB provided lighting for training. Local residents who were instrumental in this development included Tom Casey, Frank Myles, Peter Callan, Sam McGuinness, Sean Murphy, Micheal Coburn, Tom Kinch and Dermot Keelan.

In 1960, the local underage Gaelic football association, ‘Cumann Peile na nÓg’, were approached with the view to organising an underage hurling league in the town of Dundalk. Following on from discussions with Hugh O'Hare and Jim Whitty, the league was established. Naomh Moninne competed firstly at under-16 level, where they were to be successful, beating Castletown in the final after a replay, a victory that was met with great celebrations in the community. From these beginnings, there would soon be leagues running from under-8's to under-60's.

=== Start of the Poc Fada (1960–1963) ===
On 8 August 1960, Fr Mac Sheáin staged a hurling event for the young hurlers of Fatima in the Cooley Mountains. Inspired by the stories of Cú Chulainn travelling over these mountains pucking his sliothar before him, six under-16 hurlers pucked from Anaverna to Aghameen, a distance of nearly 5 statute miles (8.0 km), with the aim of completing the course in the fewest pucks. The final result was Damian Callan, 115; Jerome McDonagh, 117; Peter Myles, 125; Peter Crilly, 127; Seán McAneaney, 134; Mal Begley, 153; many of whom would later play senior hurling for Louth. Fr Mac Sheáin named the competition thereafter ‘An Poc Fada’, which is the Irish translation for ‘The Long Puck’. The winner that day was Damien Callen with 115 pucks; he is recognised as being the first person to ever win the Poc Fada.

In 1961, Fr Mac Sheáin and the Naomh Moninne club founded the All-Ireland Poc Fada Championship. Sixteen hurlers from all over Ireland were invited to take part in the tournament. The winner of the first Poc Fada was a teacher from County Limerick named Vincent ‘Godfrey’ Huggins. The following year, legendary Kilkenny goalkeeper Ollie Walsh won the tournament and went on to be joint winner in 1963. Apart from the competition being suspended between 1970 and 1980, it has been held every year since and has become a popular annual event on the national GAA calendar. It has attracted some of Ireland's greatest ever hurlers, in particular goalkeepers, whose long puckouts are well suited to the competition. Past winners include the likes of Ger Cunningham, Tommy Quaid, Davy Fitzgerald and Brendan Cummins.

=== Early success (1964–1981) ===
Success wasn't long coming to the newly formed club. They won their first Louth Hurling Championship in 1964, just five years after the club was set up. At that time, the Louth Hurling Championship had junior status, but was the highest level of championship hurling in Louth, making Naomh Moninne the top hurling club in the county. They successfully defended their title in 1965, making it two-in-a-row, a remarkable achievement for such a young club. They would not win another title until they achieved another two titles between 1973 and 1974. Winning the championship in 1974 qualified Naomh Moninne to compete in the Leinster Senior Club Hurling Championship, making them the first hurling club to represent Louth in a provincial club tournament. In their first match, they were drawn against the winners of the Meath Senior Hurling Championship, Boardsmill.

Naomh Moninne went on to win two more county titles during the seventies, in 1976 and 1978. Less than 20 years after the club was founded, Naomh Moninne had already won six county titles, establishing themselves as one of the top hurling clubs in Louth. Although the club did not win another title for the next three years, this early success would be the foundation for the clubs dominance in Louth hurling in later years.

=== Championship dominance (1982–1999) ===
Naomh Moninnes' next six county titles were won consecutively between 1982 and 1987. This feat was unprecedented at the time and no other club in Louth has since achieved the six-in-a-row. The Louth Hurling Championship was also given senior status in 1987, making Naomh Moninne the first club to win a Louth Senior Hurling Championship. While they lost in the 1988 final to Wolf Tones, Naomh Moninne recaptured the title in 1989 to make it seven titles in eight years. That same year, the club achieved its first national title at underage level by winning the Féile na nGael Division 3. In 1990, the club suffered another defeat in the county final to Wolf Tones but their underage hurlers were successful once more winning the Féile na nGael Division 4.

Their next success at senior level was when they won the double between 1992 and 1993. The club also achieved their first national title at adult level in 1993 when they won the All-Ireland Sevens Hurling Shield at the Kilmacud Crokes club in Dublin. Championship success came again in 1995 and then in abundance, when they won the treble between 1997 and 1999. This success was topped off by another All-Ireland Sevens Hurling Shield win in 1999. Naomh Moninnes' dominance of the Louth Hurling Championship during the 80's and 90's had made them the most successful club in the history of Louth hurling.

=== Transition phase (2000–2017) ===
For the first time since the club was founded, Naomh Moninne experienced a barren spell in the championship, failing to reach a county final over the next four years. The club was going through a transition phase after players from Knockbridge had broken away in 1998 to form their own team. Despite this setback, Naomh Moninne rediscovered their championship form in 2004 when they went all the way to the county final only to be beaten 1–11 to 1–6 by Pearse Óg at Páirc Mhuire in Ardee. The club did not reach another final over the next five years but remained positive, focusing their energy at underage level with the intention of rebuilding their once dominant senior team. In 2004 the club made history and headlines when 20 players from the underage section toured Croatia with senior player and youth coach Alan Moore.

In 2009, Naomh Moninne celebrated their 50th anniversary. Jubilee celebrations took place at Fairways Hotel in Dundalk on Friday, 11 September 2009 and included guest speakers, Christy Cooney and Brian Cody. The club, which had been homeless throughout these 50 years, announced that they had agreed a lease with Dundalk town council to develop land in Toberona into a playing pitch. To help finance this development, sporting memorabilia were auctioned on the night.

In 2010, Naomh Moninne made it to the county final, ending a five-year run of finals between Knockbridge and Pearse Óg, all of which Knockbridge had won. On 26 September, Naomh Moninne played Knockbridge in the final at Castlebellingham. Knockbridge were now competing for their sixth title in-a-row, a record that Moninne had set back in 1987. However, Moninne kept their record intact, beating their opponents in a thrilling comeback by 1–11 to 0–11. This was their first county title in 11 years, the longest period the club had gone without winning a title since it was first founded over 50 years previously. However, success did not last long as Moninne experienced another dry spell and did not reach the final again for another 7 years. On this occasion, they beat reigning champions St. Fechin's in the decider at Castlebellingham by 0–16 to 0–14.

== Honours ==
=== Adult ===
- Louth Senior Hurling Championship

Winners (22): 1964, 1965, 1973, 1974, 1976, 1978, 1982, 1983, 1984, 1985, 1986, 1987, 1989, 1992, 1993, 1995, 1997, 1998, 1999, 2010, 2017, 2019
Runners-up (5): 1988, 1990, 1991, 1996, 2004

- All-Ireland Senior Hurling Sevens Shield

Winners (2): 1993, 1999

=== Underage ===
- Féile na nGael Division 3

Winners (1): 1989

- Féile na nGael Division 4

Winners (1): 1990

- Féile na nGael Division 6

Winners (1): 2014
Runners-up (1): 2013
