= All-Ireland Sevens Hurling =

All-Ireland Sevens Hurling competitions are seven-a-side national inter-club hurling tournaments held at senior, intermediate and junior level at the Kilmacud Sevens, Ratoath Sevens and St. Judes Sevens respectively. These competitions are played off in one day annually the day before the All-Ireland Hurling Final - at nearby Croke Park as part of the All-Ireland festivities.

The Kilmacud Crokes GAA club in South County Dublin have hosted the senior competition since 1973. Ratoath GAA club in County Meath since 2008 have held the intermediate sevens and St Jude's GAA the junior competition since 1991.
