= Knockbridge GAA =

Louth-based Gaelic games club

Knockbridge
- Droichead an Chnoic
- Founded: 1999
- County: Louth
- Colours: Red and white
- Grounds: Páirc an Chuinnigh

Playing kits
Standard colours

Senior Club Championships
	All Ireland	Leinster champions	Louth champions
Hurling:	0	0	12

Knockbridge GAA is a Gaelic Athletic Association club located in Knockbridge, County Louth, Ireland. Founded in 1999, the club is solely concerned with the game of hurling. The club has won 12 Louth Senior Hurling Championship titles.

== History ==
After hurling was first introduced to the Knockbridge area in 1984, Knockbridge Juvenile Hurling Club was established the following year. A number of under-12 and under-14 titles were secured over the next few years. An adult section of the juvenile club was founded on 12 November 1998. Knockbridge Hurling Club was eventually affiliated at the first County Committee meeting on 4 January 1999. A year later, the club won its first Louth Senior Hurling Championship title after a defeat of Wolfe Tones in the final. The club went on to win 12 Louth SHC titles, including "5 in a row" between 2005 and 2009. Knockbridge reached the 2006 Leinster JCHC final but were beaten by Danesfort. After winning their 12th title in the 2020 county final, Knockbridge reached the 2021 and 2022 county finals, losing to St. Fechins of Termonfeckin on both occasions.

== Honours ==
- Louth Senior Hurling Championship (12): 2000, 2001, 2003, 2005, 2006, 2007, 2008, 2009, 2011, 2014, 2018, 2020
