= Louth GAA =

County board of the Gaelic Athletic Association in Ireland

- Irish: Lú; Lughbhadh (seanlitriú)
- Nickname(s): The wee county
- Province: Leinster
- Dominant sport: Gaelic football
- Ground(s): DEFY Páirc Mhuire
- County colours: Red White

Executive
- Chairman: Seán McClean

County teams
- NFL: Division 2
- NHL: Division 3A
- Football Championship: Sam Maguire Cup
- Hurling Championship: Lory Meagher Cup

The Louth County Board of the Gaelic Athletic Association (GAA) (Irish: Cumann Lúthchleas Gael, Coiste Chontae Lú) or Louth GAA is one of the 32 county boards of the GAA in Ireland, and is responsible for Gaelic games in County Louth.

It oversees competitions such as the Louth Senior Football Championship (SFC), Louth Intermediate Football Championship (IFC), Louth Junior Football Championship (JFC) and Louth Senior Hurling Championship (SHC), as well as numerous underage and secondary competitions. Louth has 38 clubs.

The county board is also responsible for the Louth county teams in both football and hurling. The county football team won the All-Ireland Senior Football Championship (SFC) in 1910, 1912 and again in 1957.

== Governance ==
The officials who have chaired the Board since the establishment of the Gaelic Athletic Association are named below.

Elections for chairman and other positions take place at the board's annual convention and are held at County headquarters in Darver. The maximum term for any position under current county board rules is five years.

Barry Brennan of St Kevin's was made Honorary President of Louth GAA at the end of 2025.

Name	Year(s)	Club
James Moore	1886	Dundalk Nationals
Thomas Smyth	1887	Dundalk Young Irelands
Fr. Arthur Smyth	1888	Togher
James Weldon	1889	Drogheda Gaelics
Tom Brannigan	1890	Drogheda Gaelics
No Convention	1891–94	—N/a
Alfred Palmer	1895	Drogheda Commercials
John Corr	1896	Drogheda Emmets
Jim Carolan	1897	Dreadnots
John Landy	1898	Dunleer Emmets
No Convention	1899–1901	—N/a
Larry Stanley	1902	Drogheda Independents
Pat McKeever	1903	Ardee Volunteers
Tom O'Connell	1904–06	Mountpleasant Gaels
Fr. John Mullen	1907–09	Cooley Kickhams
Joe Ward	1910	Dundalk Young Irelands
Jack Clarke	1911–12	Tredaghs (Drogheda)
Tom McNello	1913–15	Ardee St Mochta's
Denis Trainor	1916	Hearts of Oriel
Joe Ward	1917–20	Dundalk Young Irelands
Nick Butterly	1921–22	Hitchestown
Patrick Duffy	1923–24	Newtown Blues
Séamus Flood	1925	Clan na Gael
Christy Bellew	1925–27	Larks (Killineer)
Tom Burke	1928–31	Wolfe Tones
Séamus Flood	1932–38	Clan na Gael

Name	Year(s)	Club
Peter Woods	1939–41	Cooley Kickhams
James Jordan	1942–43	Geraldines
Fr. Paddy Downey	1944–45	Dundalk Gaels
James Jordan	1946	Geraldines
J. J. Matthews	1947–56	Newtown Blues
Jimmy Mullen	1957–61	St Dominic's (Drogheda)
J. J. Matthews	1962	Newtown Blues
Brendan Breathnach	1963	St Bride's
Joseph Reilly	1964–66	Parnells (Drogheda)
Seán Murray	1967–69	Oliver Plunketts
Nicky Marry	1970–76	St Bride's
Frank Lynch	1977–79	Geraldines
Paddy Kenny	1980–84	Dundalk Gaels/Na Piarsaigh
Jim Lennon	1985–87	St Mochta's
Paddy McGlew	1988–91	St Fechin's
John Lynch	1992	Geraldines
Peter Brannigan	1993–98	Clan na Gael
Terry Maher	1999–2001	Oliver Plunketts
Paddy McMahon	2002–04	Seán O'Mahony's
Paddy Oliver	2005–09	St Patrick's
Pádraig O'Connor	2010–14	St Patrick's
Des Halpenny	2015–19	John Mitchels
Peter Fitzpatrick	2020–23	Clan na Gael
Seán McClean	2024–	Hunterstown Rovers

== Crest ==
The former Louth GAA crest

In 2010, the Drogheda Gaelic football club, O'Raghallaighs, tabled a motion for convention calling for the Boyne Valley Cable Bridge symbol to be removed from the Louth GAA crest because of the bridge's main location being in the neighbouring county of Meath; this led to the county crest being altered to feature a modern version of St Brigid's cross.

== Football ==
=== Clubs ===
Clubs contest the Louth Senior Football Championship. That competition's most successful club is Newtown Blues, with 23 titles.

Dundalk Young Irelands is the county's oldest GAA club. The club represented Louth in the first All-Ireland Football final which was played at Beech Hill on 29 April 1888 against Limerick Commercials.

=== County team ===
The earliest recorded inter-county football match took place in 1712 when Louth faced Meath at Slane. A fragment of a poem from 1806 records a football match between Louth and Fermanagh at Inniskeen, Co Monaghan.

When Louth GAA sent the team into training in Dundalk for the 1913 Croke Memorial replay under a soccer trainer from Belfast, the move caused more than a ripple through the Association. For thirty years full-time training in bursts of a week or so before a big match were common. After that the two or three times a week gatherings became more popular.

Between 1945 and 1953 Louth and Meath met 13 times. The crowds got bigger and bigger each time as they played draw after draw in the Championship. The attendance of 42,858 at a thrilling 1951 replay remained a record for a provincial match other than a final for forty years until the four match series between Meath and Dublin in 1991. The rivalry with Meath has never fizzled out, as witnessed by a stirring Leinster SFC semi-final in 1998. Nor has controversy, as witnessed by Graham Geraghty's "wide" 45th minute point.

In 1957 showband star Dermot O'Brien was late for the All-Ireland SFC final and joined the team when the parade was completed. Prior to the game O'Brien had captained the side in the semi-final success, when the regular captain Patsy Coleman had been injured very early in the season, leaving O'Brien to resume his previous role as captain. Coleman today still has the match ball. O'Brien played a key role as Louth beat Cork with the help of a goal from Sean Cunningham with five minutes to go. As both Cork and Louth wear Red and White, on that day Louth wore the green of Leinster, while Cork wore the blue of Munster. Dermot O'Brien died on 22 May 2007.

On 27 June 2010, Louth reached their first Leinster SFC final in 50 years. During the decider, which was played on 11 July that year, anger and controversy erupted when, during the 74th minute of the match against Meath, a goal was awarded by the referee after brief consultation with only one of the match umpires (although close circuit camera evidence shown on RTÉ Two's coverage of the game proved that the ball was carried over the line by a Meath player). However, Meath received the 2010 Leinster Title and the cup. More on that in the main article linked above.In 2025 Louth beat Meath to win the Leinster championship for the first time in 68 years with a score line of 3–14 to 1–18.

== Hurling ==
=== Clubs ===
Clubs contest the Louth Senior Hurling Championship. That competition's most successful club is Naomh Moninne, with 22 titles.

=== County team ===
The Louth hurling team plays its championship hurling in the Nicky Rackard Cup. The Louth hurlers finished as runner-up to London in the 2005 final at Croke Park, and to Sligo in 2008. In 2016, they competed in the Lory Meagher Cup, defeating Sligo in the final 4–15 to 4–11, and Fermanagh in the 2020 final by 2–19 to 2–8.

By winning the 2022 Lory Meagher Cup, Louth became the first team to win that competition on three occasions.

== Camogie ==
Louth contested two All Ireland senior finals. Fr Tom Soraghan was zealously promoting the game in Darver, where players such as Ros Quigley and her Darver team-mates were involved. Other notable players include junior player of the year winner in 1982 Vivianne Kelley. As of 2025, the manager of Louth is Donal Kelly and his side operate in Division 3A of the National Camogie League.

Under Camogie's National Development Plan 2010–2015, "Our Game, Our Passion", Carlow, Cavan, Laois, Louth and Roscommon were to get a total of 17 new clubs by 2015.

Louth has the following achievements in camogie.

- All-Ireland Senior Camogie Championship runners-up: 1934, 1936

== Ladies' football ==
Louth has a ladies' football team.
