= 1991 All-Ireland Senior Football Championship =

Football championship

Championship details
- Dates: 19 May – 15 September 1991
- Teams: 32

All-Ireland Champions
- Winning team: Down (4th win)
- Captain: Paddy O'Rourke
- Manager: Pete McGrath

All-Ireland Finalists
- Losing team: Meath
- Captain: Liam Hayes
- Manager: Seán Boylan

Provincial Champions
- Munster: Kerry
- Leinster: Meath
- Ulster: Down
- Connacht: Roscommon

Championship statistics
- No. matches played: 38
- Top Scorer: Brian Stafford (4–62)
- Player of the Year: Colm O'Rourke

The 1991 All-Ireland Senior Football Championship was the 105th staging of the All-Ireland Senior Football Championship, the Gaelic Athletic Association's premier inter-county Gaelic football tournament. The championship began on 19 May 1991 and ended on 15 September 1991.

In the Munster semi-final Kerry ended Cork's 2 years as All Ireland champions.

Down defeated Meath in the final by a scoreline of 1–16 to 1–14. The Ulster county's victory was to be the start of four consecutive All-Ireland titles for the province. For Meath, it was their second consecutive defeat in a final, having lost to Cork in the 1990 final.

The Championship was noted for the tie between Dublin and Meath that took three replays to decide.

== Results ==
=== Connacht Senior Football Championship ===
Quarter-finals

2 June 1991 Quarter-final	London	2–9 – 6–14	Mayo	Emerald GAA Grounds, Ruislip
	J Landy 0–6, P McIntyre 1–0, J McCormack 1–0, T McDonnell 0–1, R Flaherty 0–1, T McBride 0–1.		N Durkan 3–1, T Morley 2–0, R Dempsey 1–1, L McHale 0–3, C McMenamin 0–2, S Maher 0–2, M Fitzmaurice 0–2, P McStay 0–2, WJ Padden 0–1.	Attendance: 5,000; Referee: J Carney (Roscommon)

9 June 1991 Quarter-final	Leitrim	1–16 – 0–5	Sligo	Páirc Sheáin Mhic Dhiarmada, Carrick-on-Shannon
	C Mahon 0–7, S Heslin 1–1, B Breen 0–2, P Kenny 0–2, M Quinn 0–2, M Martin 0–1, P Kieran 0–1.		D McGoldrick 0–2, T Deignan 0–2, D Keaveney 0–1.	Attendance: 8,000; Referee: J Cosgrove (County Mayo)

Semi-finals

23 June 1991 Semi-final	Mayo	3–11 – 0–6	Galway	MacHale Park, Castlebar
	M Fitzmaurice 0–6, P McStay 1–2, T Morley 1–0, N Durkan 1–0, R Dempsey 0–3.		F O'Neill 0–3, T Kilcommins 0–1, C O'Dea 0–1, H Blehein 0–1.	Attendance: 18,000; Referee: F Finan (Sligo)

30 June 1991 Semi-final	Leitrim	0–8 – 0–12	Roscommon	Páirc Sheáin Mhic Dhiarmada, Carrick-on-Shannon
	C mahon 0–3, P Kenny 0–2, B Breen 0–2, L Conlon 0–1.		T McManus 0–5, D Duggan 0–3, M Donlon 0–3, T Grehan 0–1.	Attendance: 11,000; Referee: P Egan (Galway)

Finals

14 July 1991 Final	Mayo	0–14 – 0–14	Roscommon	MacHale Park, Castlebar
	L Mchale 0–2, M Fitzmaurice 0–2, T Morley 0–2, R Dempsey 0–2, P McStay 0–2, WJ Padden 0–1, C McMenamon 0–1, T Tierney 0–1, TJ Kilgallon 0–1.		D Duggan 0–6, P Earley 0–2, T McManus 0–2, P Hickey 0–1, M Reilly 0–1, J Newton 0–1, M Donlon 0–1.	Attendance: 25,000; Referee: P Egan (Galway)

28 July 1991 Final replay	Roscommon	0–13 – 1–9	Mayo	Dr. Hyde Park, Roscommon
	D Duggan 0–8, M Donlon 0–2, J Newton 0–1, T Grehan 0–1, T McManus 0–1.		A Finnerty 1–0, M Fitzmaurice 0–3, P McStay 0–2, T Tierney 0–1, C McMenamon 0–1, L McHale 0–1, WJ Padden 0–1.	Attendance: 24,000; Referee: P Egan (Galway)

=== Leinster Senior Football Championship ===
The 1991 Leinster Championship was run as an open draw for the first time since 1975, with no teams being seeded. Preliminary round

19 May 1991 Preliminary round	Carlow	2–7 – 3–14	Wexford	Dr. Cullen Park, Carlow
	L Molloy 1–2, J Nevin 1–0, M Nolan 0–2, J Murphy 0–2, A Callinan 0–1.		L Rafter 1–3, M Stafford 1–2, M Fleming 1–1, M Hendrick 0–3, J Harrington 0–2, J Power 0–1, C Javans 0–1, G Watters 0–1.	Referee: A Maher (Laois)

26 May 1991 Preliminary round	Louth	2–13 – 2–12	Longford	Drogheda Park, Drogheda
	J McDonnell 1–2, C O'Hanlon 1–2, P Butterly 0–5, B Kerins 0–3, D Reilly 0–1.		D Barry 0–6, C Fox 1–1, C Bawle 1–0, B O'Connor 0–2, R Culhane 0–1, G Fox 0–1, P Victory 0–1.	Referee: V Lynch (Meath)

2 June 1991 Preliminary round	Dublin	1–12 – 1–12	Meath	Croke Park, Dublin
	C Redmond 0–7, M Galvin 1–0, P Curran 0–2, T Carr 0–1, J Sheedy 0–1, V Murphy 0–1.		B Stafford 1–4, B Flynn 0–3, T Dowd 0–2, PJ Gillic 0–2, S Kelly 0–1.	Attendance: 51,144; Referee: T Howard (Kildare)

9 June 1991 Preliminary round replay	Dublin	1–11 – 1–11 (aet)	Meath	Croke Park, Dublin
	B Rock 0–8, J Sheedy 1–0, E Heery 0–1, P Clarke 0–1, K Duff 0–1.		B Stafford 0–5, D Beggy 1–1, PJ Gillic 0–2, S Kelly 0–1, C O'Rourke 0–1, B Flynn 0–1.	Attendance: 60,960; Referee: T Howard (Kildare)

23 June 1991 Preliminary round second replay	Dublin	1–14 – 2–11 (aet)	Meath	Croke Park, Dublin
	P Clark 1–1, B Rock 0–3, N Guiden 0–3, J Sheedy 0–2, J Nally 0–2, P Bealin 0–1, D Sheehan 0–1, P Curran 0–1.		B Stafford 0–10, B Flynn 1–1, C Coyle 1–0.	Attendance: 62,736; Referee: T Howard (Kildare)

6 July 1991 Preliminary round third replay	Dublin	0–15 – 2–10	Meath	Croke Park, Dublin
	C Redmond 0–5, N Guiden 0–4, P Curran 0–2, D Sheehan 0–2, M Galvin 0–2.	Report	B Stafford 1–6, K Foley 1–0, B Flynn 0–2, M McCabe 0–1, D Beggy 0–1.	Attendance: 61,543; Referee: T Howard (Kildare)

Quarter-finals

9 June 1991 Quarter-final	Laois	1–17 – 0–6	Westmeath	O'Moore Park, Portlaoise
				Referee: N Whelan (Wexford)

16 June 1991 Quarter-final	Louth	2–11 – 2–10	Kildare	Drogheda Park, Drogheda
	S White 2–4, P Butterly 0–4, B Kerins 0–2, F Murphy 0–1.		P McLoughlin 0–6, D Kerrigan 1–1, J Gilroy 1–0, J McDonald 0–2, B Donovan 0–1.	Attendance: 15,000; Referee: P Collins (Westmeath)

16 June 1991 Quarter-final	Wexford	0–7 – 1–7	Offaly	Wexford Park, Wexford
	B Dodd 0–3, M Stafford 0–1, J Harrington 0–1, M Hanrick 0–1, M Fleming 0–1.		B Lowry 1–2, P Brady 0–3, D Claffey 0–1, V Claffey 0–1.	Attendance: 4,000; Referee: D Guerin (Dublin)

14 July 1991 Quarter-final	Meath	1–9 – 0–12	Wicklow	Croke Park, Dublin
	B Stafford 1–6, M McCabe 0–2, C O'Rourke 0–1.		C Daye 0–4, K O'Brien 0–3, P Baker 0–1, M Murtagh 0–1, F Daly 0–1, B Kenny 0–1, P O'Byrne 0–1.	Attendance: 35,123; Referee: N Whelan (Wexford)

21 July 1991 Quarter-final replay	Meath	1–12 – 1–9	Wicklow	Croke Park, Dublin
	B Stafford 0–6, B Flynn 1–2, M O'Connell 0–1, L Hayes 0–1, D Beggy 0–1, C O'Rourke 0–1.		P Baker 1–4, F Daly 0–2, P Byrne 0–1, C Daye 0–1, A O'Sullivan 0–1.	Attendance: 41,215; Referee: N Whelan (Wexford)

Semi-finals

7 July 1991 Semi-final	Laois	1–10 – 2–7	Louth	Croke Park, Dublin
	M Turley 0–6, L Turley 1–0, C Maher 0–2, T Maher 0–1, M Lawlor 0–1.		C O'Hanlon 1–1, P Butterly 1–1, S White 0–3, B Kearns 0–2.	Attendance: 16,441; Referee: P Whelan (Wicklow)

14 July 1991 Semi-final replay	Laois	2–14 – 0–12	Louth	Croke Park, Dublin
	M Lawlor 2–3, M Turley 0–6, N Roe 0–2, C Maher 0–1, T Maher 0–1, P Roe 0–1.		P Butterly 0–4, B Kerins 0–2, N Browne 0–2, F Murphy 0–1, S O'Hanlon 0–1, L McGuigan 0–1, S White 0–1.

28 July 1991 Semi-final	Meath	2–13 – 0–7	Offaly	Croke Park, Dublin
	B Stafford 1–6, J McDermott 1–0, C Coyle 0–2, B Flynn 0–2, PJ Gillic 0–1, T Dowd 0–1, C O'Rourke 0–1.		D Reynolds 0–2, V Claffey 0–2, P Brady 0–1, B Lowry 0–1, Derek Claffey 0–1.	Attendance: 22,038; Referee: J Woods (Dublin)

Final

10 August 1991 Final	Meath	1–11 – 0–8	Laois	Croke Park, Dublin
	B Stafford 0–5, D Beggy 1–0, B Flynn 0–3, C Coyle 0–2, C O'Rourke 0–1.		M Turley 0–4, L Turley 0–2, P Roe 0–1.	Attendance: 28,157; Referee: T Howard (Kildare)

=== Munster Senior Football Championship ===
In 1991, for the first time in years, the Munster Championship got rid of its seeded draw system and moved to an open draw. With the exception of Tipperary in 1935, Kerry or Cork had won every Munster title since 1923. The open draw was expected to weaken Kerry and Cork, and improve Clare, Limerick, Tipperary and Waterford. Since 1947, Cork vs Kerry was the most common Munster final until 1990, but less common from then on.

Quarter-finals

26 May 1991 Quarter-final	Clare	2–12 – 5–16	Kerry	Cusack Park, Ennis
	G Killeen 1–1, S Keane 1–1, M Flynn 0–4, F McInerney 0–3, MJ Thynne 0–2, P Vaughan 0–1.		D Farrell 2–1, M Fitzgerald 0–7, J O'Shea 0–4, P Dennehy 1–0, W Maher 0–3, C Murphy 1–0, T Fleming 0–1.	Attendance: 3,500; Referee: R Moloney (Limerick)

26 May 1991 Quarter-final	Limerick	0–14 – 2–7	Tipperary	Páirc na nGael, Askeaton
	T Cummins 0–4, J Donovan 0–3, L Long 0–2, D Larkin 0–2, E Sheehan 0–1, S Kelly 0–1, P Danaher 0–1.		J Dunne 1–0, D Hogan 1–0, P Lambert 0–3, D Hahesay 0–1, J O'Meara 0–1, C McGrath 0–1, J Costello 0–1.	Attendance: 3,500; Referee: T Sugrue (Kerry)

Semi-finals

16 June 1991 Semi-final	Kerry	1–10 – 0–11	Cork	Fitzgerald Stadium, Killarney
	M Fitzgerald 0–5, J Cronin 1–1, T Fleming 0–1, A O'Donovan 0–1, J O'Shea 0–1, P Dennehy 0–1.		L Tompkins 0–2, J O'Driscoll 0–2, D Culloty 0–2, D Barry 0–1, M Slocum 0–1, S Fahy 0–1, P McGrath 0–1, M McCarthy 0–1.	Attendance: 41,334; Referee: P Russell (Tipperary)

23 June 1991 Semi-final	Waterford	0–11 – 0–13	Limerick	Fraher Field, Dungarvan
	E O'Brien 0–3, P Whyte 0–2, P Ferncombe 0–1, M McGrath 0–1, P Queally 0–1, P Hynes 0–1, L Dalton 0–1, L O'Connor 0–1.		D Fitzgibbon 0–2, T Cummins 0–2, D Fitzgerald 0–2, J O'Donovan 0–2, E Sheehan 0–1, L Long 0–1, D Larkin 0–1, J Reddington 0–1, J Quane 0–1.	Referee: J O'Leary (Cork)

Final

21 July 1991 Final	Kerry	0–23 – 3–12	Limerick	Fitzgerald Stadium, Killarney
	M Fitzgerald 0–12, J Cronin 0–3, J O'Shea 0–3, P Dennehy 0–2, P Spillane 0–2, A O'Donovan 0–1.		S Kelly 2–1, J O'Donovan 1–2, D Fitzgerald 0–4, F Ryan 0–2, T Browne 0–1, J Quane 0–1, PJ Garvey 0–1.	Attendance: 25,900; Referee: P Russell (Tipperary)

=== Ulster Senior Football Championship ===
Preliminary round

19 May 1991 Preliminary round	Tyrone	1–8 – 1–9	Derry	Healy Park, Omagh
	A Cush 1–3, P Donaghy 0–2, D O'Hagan 0–1, K McCabe 0–1, D McGleenan 0–1.		D cassidy 1–1, E Burns 0–4, E Gormley 0–2, D McNicholl 0–1, F McCusker 0–1.	Referee: D Campbell (Fermanagh)

Quarter-finals

26 May 1991 Quarter-final	Antrim	1–8 – 3–12	Fermanagh	Casement Park, Belfast
	J Kennedy 1–3, T Connolly 0–2, B McCann 0–1, J McAleese 0–1, D Armstrong 0–1.		P Coyle 1–3, S Bradley 1–2, M Gallagher 1–1, M O'Rourke 0–3, C Curran 0–1, J Leonard 0–1, J Rehill 0–1.	Attendance: 5,000; Referee: T McDermott (Cavan)

2 June 1991 Quarter-final	Donegal	2–14 – 0–12	Cavan	MacCumhaill Park, Ballybofey
	M Boyle 0–5, A Molloy 1–1, M Gallagher 1–0, B Cunningham 0–2, C Mulgrew 0–2, D Reid 0–2, M Gavigan 0–1, B Murray 0–1.		R Carolan 0–4, P Lynch 0–2, S King 0–2, L Bardy 0–1, J Reilly 0–1, N O'Donnell 0–1, D Brady 0–1.	Referee: J Curran (Tyrone)

9 June 1991 Quarter-final	Down	1–7 – 0–8	Armagh	Páirc Esler, Newry
	M Linden 1–0, G Mason 0–3, R Carr 0–2, DJ Kane 0–1, L Austin 0–1.		J Toner 0–5, M Grimley 0–1, B O'Kane 0–1, M Toye 0–1.	Attendance: 17,000; Referee: M Greenan (Cavan)

16 June 1991 Quarter-final	Derry	0–13 – 0–8	Monaghan	Celtic Park, Derry
	E Gormley 0–5, E Burns 0–3, D McNicholl 0–2, J McGurk 0–1, D Heaney 0–1, D Cassidy 0–1.		R McCarron 0–3, E McEneaney 0–2, D Byrne 0–1, G McGuirk 0–1, E Murphy 0–1.	Attendance: 10,000; Referee: G McClorey (Antrim)

Semi-finals

23 June 1991 Semi-final	Donegal	1–18 – 0–13	Fermanagh	Healy Park, Omagh
	D Bonnar 0–6, T Boyle 1–2, M Boyle 0–3, M McHugh 0–2, B Murray 0–2, B McGowan 0–2, J McMullan 0–1.		P Coyle 0–5, J Reilhill 0–2, B Brewster 0–2, S Bradley 0–2, M Gallagher 0–1, M O'Rourke 0–1.	Attendance: 10,000; Referee: M Cranney (Down)

30 June 1991 Semi-final	Down	0–13 – 1–10	Derry	Athletic Grounds, Armagh
	R Carr 0–9, M Linden 0–1, J McCartan 0–1, G Blaney 0–1, DJ Kane 0–1.		E Burns 1–5, F McCusker 0–1, D McNicholl 0–1, D Barton 0–1, J Brolly 0–1, A Tohill 0–1.	Attendance: 12,000; Referee: M Greenan (Cavan)

14 July 1991 Semi-final replay	Down	0–14 – 0–9	Derry	Athletic Grounds, Armagh
	R Carr 0–9, M Linden 0–2, P McCartan 0–1, G Blaney 0–1, G Mason 0–1.		E Gormley 0–3, J Brolly 0–2, EBurns 0–1, C McGuirk 0–1, A Tohill 0–1, D McNicholl 0–1.	Attendance: 12,000; Referee: M Greenan (Cavan)

Final

28 July 1991 Final	Down	1–15 – 0–10	Donegal	St. Tiernach's Park, Clones
	M Linden 1–1, R Carr 0–3, G Blaney 0–3, G Mason 0–3, J McCartan 0–2, P Higgins 0–1, DJ Kane 0–1, B Breen 0–1.		D Bonnar 0–4, T Boyle 0–3, N Boyle 0–2, P Brogan 0–1.	Attendance: 22,000; Referee: D Campbell (Fermanagh)

=== All-Ireland Senior Football Championship ===
Semi-finals

11 August 1991 Semi-final	Down	2–9 – 0–8	Kerry	Croke Park, Dublin
	P Withnail 2–1, R Carr 0–4, G Mason 0–2, M Linden 0–2.		M Fitzgerald 0–5, P Spillane 0–2, A O'Donovan 0–1.	Attendance: 40,166; Referee: T Howard (Kildare)

18 August 1991 Semi-final	Meath	0–15 – 1–11	Roscommon	Croke Park, Dublin
	B Stafford 0–9, T Dowd 0–2, PJ Gillic 0–1, D Beggy 0–1, M O'Connell 0–1, B Flynn 0–1.		D Duggan 1–8, E McManus 0–3.	Referee: D Campbell (Fermanagh)

Final

15 September 1991 Final	Down	1–16 – 1–14	Meath	Croke Park, Dublin
	R Carr 0–5, G Mason 0–4, B Breen 1–0, J McCartan 0–3, E Burns 0–2, M Linden 0–1, G Blaney 0–1.		B Flynn 0–6, B Stafford 0–5, L Hayes 1–1, C O'Rourke 0–1, D Beggy 0–1.	Attendance: 64,500; Referee: S Prior (Leitrim)

== Championship statistics ==
=== Scoring ===
Overall

Rank	Player	County	Tally	Total	Matches	Average
1	Brian Stafford	Meath	4–62	74	10	7.40
2	Ross Carr	Down	0–30	30	6	5.00
3	Maurice Fitzgerald	Kerry	0–29	29	4	7.25
4	Derek Duggan	Roscommon	1–25	28	4	7.00
5	Bernard Flynn	Meath	0–27	27	10	2.70

Single game

Rank	Player	County	Tally	Total	Opposition
1	Maurice Fitzgerald	Kerry	0–12	12	Limerick
2	Derek Duggan	Roscommon	1–8	11	Meath
3	Noel Durkin	Mayo	3–1	10	London
3	Stefan White	Louth	2–4	10	Kildare
3	Brian Stafford	Meath	0–10	10	Dublin
6	Mick Lawlor	Laois	2–3	9	Louth
6	Brian Stafford	Meath	1–6	9	Dublin
6	Brian Stafford	Meath	1–6	9	Wicklow
6	Brian Stafford	Meath	1–6	9	Offaly
6	Ross Carr	Down	0–9	9	Derry
6	Brian Stafford	Meath	0–9	9	Roscommon
6	Ross Carr	Down	0–9	9	Derry

=== Miscellaneous ===
- Seeding is abolished in the Leinster and Munster championships meaning an open draw in Leinster for the first time since 1974 or Munster for the first time in 40 years.
- Fermanagh's 3–12 to 1–8 defeat of Antrim in the Ulster quarter-final is their first victory in the championship since 1983.
- The 1991 championship became famous for the four-game saga between Meath and Dublin in the preliminary round of the Leinster Championship. The four games comprised three draws, with two still ending level even after extra time. Meath eventually triumphed by a single point. A combined total of just under 237,000 people attended the four games in what was a major windfall for the Leinster Council.
- The Meath-Dublin saga was the first SFC tie since Carlow-Wexford (1941) to be played four times in one season.
- While in the Quarter-final stage of the Leinster championship Meath played Wicklow twice and in the semi-final game between Laois and Louth also ended in a draw and went to replay making it the largest Leinster championship ever (15) and was not equalled until 2000.
- Limerick reached their first Munster final since 1965 but lost it to Kerry, since 1947 all Munster finals expect for Cork vs Clare 1949, Cork vs Waterford 1957, Kerry vs Waterford 1960 and Kerry vs Limerick in 1965 the rest were all Kerry vs Cork deciders.
- Meath and Laois meet in the Leinster final for the first time since 1951.
- Meath became the first side since Kildare (1903) to play 10 senior football championship matches in one season.
- Down win the All Ireland final for the first time in 23 years and were first Ulster county since 1968 to win and also first not from Munster/Leinster of course.
