= Cork–Kerry Gaelic football rivalry =

Sports rivalry

Cork-Kerry
- Location: County Cork; County Kerry
- Teams: Cork; Kerry
- First meeting: Cork 0-2 - 0-1 Kerry; 1889 Munster semi-final (27 July 1889)
- Latest meeting: Kerry 1-23 - 1-15 Cork; Munster-final (10 May 2026)
- Stadiums: Fitzgerald Stadium (Kerry); Páirc Uí Chaoimh (Cork)

Statistics
- Total meetings: 126
- Most wins: Kerry (80)
- Top scorer: Colm Cooper (5-77)
- All-time series: Kerry 80-13-33 Cork
- Largest victory: Kerry 4-22 - 1-9 Cork; 2021 Munster Final (25 July 2021)

The Cork-Kerry rivalry is a Gaelic football rivalry between Irish county teams Cork and Kerry, who first played each other in 1889. It is considered to be one of the biggest rivalries in Gaelic games. Cork's home ground is Páirc Uí Chaoimh and Kerry's home ground is Fitzgerald Stadium, however, some of their championship meetings have been held at neutral venues, usually Croke Park.

While Kerry have the highest number of Munster titles and Cork are ranked second on the roll of honour, they have also enjoyed success in the All-Ireland Senior Football Championship, having won 44 championship titles between them to date.

As of 2025 the sides have met 125 times in the championship including meeting twice at the All-Ireland final stage. Kerry won both of these games.

== Roots ==
=== History ===
The Cork-Kerry rivalry can lay claim to be the greatest rivalry in Gaelic football. As the nearest of neighbours these two teams are also the fiercest of rivals. In spite of an almost annual meeting in the Munster Senior Football Championship, interest in the clash of these two teams has endured over the last 120 years. Kerry are the most successful team in the history of the All-Ireland Senior Football Championship, leading the all-time roll of honour with thirty-five titles. Cork, in comparison, have only won seven All-Ireland titles.

The rivalry began in 1889 when these two sides met in the championship for the first time. Cork dominated the first decade, before Kerry found their niche. A brief resurgence by Cork in the early years of the new century was followed by an unprecedented era of dominance by Kerry. Between 1909 and 1943 Cork faced Kerry on sixteen different occasions and, unfortunately, they faced defeat in all of these games.

The 1940s saw Cork flourish for a brief period, before Kerry asserted their dominance once again. Cork only claimed two victories over Kerry in the 1950s and 1960s, however, the rivalry intensified to unprecedented levels in the 1970s and 1980s. The early part of the 1970s saw Cork win three Munster titles in four years. After winning the All-Ireland title in 1973 the county looked set for a few more years of dominance. Kerry, however, bounced back with what has been described as the greatest team of all-time. Kerry won twelve Munster titles between 1975 and 1986, defeating Cork on each occasion. Cork's lone victory came in the 1983 provincial decider when they stopped Kerry from claiming a record nine-in-a-row.

In 1987 Cork broke the Kerry stranglehold at last and made hay while their biggest rivals were going through a transition. Over the next nine years they won seven Munster titles and two All-Ireland titles. The introduction of the qualifiers system in 2001 saw the launch of the Cork-Kerry rivalry on the national stage at Croke Park. Although Cork have defeated Kerry in the provincial series of games on a number of occasions, Kerry have proved themselves to be the masters in the All-Ireland series, particularly in 2007 when Kerry trounced Cork in a unique all-Munster All-Ireland final.

Usually games are held in rotation on home soil between 2015 and 2017 played 3 times running at Fitzgerald Stadium, Killarney due to Páirc Uí Chaoimh, Cork been renovated. Between 2018 and 2020 meet 3 times running in Páirc Uí Chaoimh, Cork as to even out games. Very rare if the teams meet in unusual side of the draw was a Munster Quarter-final the teams usually meet in either a Munster Semi-final or Final. Only once since 1946 in 1992 they meet at the Quarter-final stage of the Munster championship the year Clare won the Munster title.

=== Statistics ===
Team	All-Ireland	Munster	National League	Total
Kerry	38	85	23	146
Cork	7	35	6	46
Combined	46	121	29	192

== Notable moments ==
- Cork 0–2 : 0–1 Kerry (1889 at Mallow) – Not only was this the first clash in what would later become one of the greatest rivalries, but the game also marked Kerry's debut in the championship. Several thousand spectators attended the game; however, the score was a low one. Kerry took a one-point lead at the interval, however, Cork fought back in the second-half without reward. Cork leveled the game in the fourth quarter; however, both sides hit several wides. With five minutes left ‘the Rebels’ secured a 0–2 to 0–1 lead. Kerry had a number of chances to secure a draw, however, these were spurned.
- Cork 2–3 : 0–9 Kerry (1943 at the Cork Athletic Grounds) – The 1940s saw Cork's footballing fortunes take a turn in the right direction. One of the Munster semi-final paired Cork and Kerry, however, Kerry were still the overwhelming favourites. Seven new players came into a Cork side that attacked the provincial kingpins from the off. Cork had a 1–2 to 0–4 at the interval, however, it was not a true reflection of their superiority. Kerry regrouped in the second period, however, a goal by Jim Cronin gave Cork a one-point lead in the dying stages of the game. Kerry, however, equalised with a point to force a draw and a replay.
- Cork 1–5 : 1–4 Kerry (1943 at the Cork Athletic Grounds) – After protracted negotiations the replay was fixed for Cork. A bumper crowd flocked to the city to see the game. Kerry recalled six players who had retired to bolster their chances in the replay. Cork did not show the same superiority as they did in the drawn game, however, they were give plenty of opportunities to win after the interval. Coming up to the long whistle Kerry were leading by two points, albeit against the run of play. One of the Kerry full-backs failed to hold the ball in his own goalmouth, leading to a Cork attack which resulted in a goal. This score gave Cork a 1–5 to 1–4 lead as the referee blew the final whistle. There were great scenes of jubilation by the Cork contingent as it was their first victory over Kerry since the 1909 championship. The Cork players were hailed as the heroes and were duly chaired off the field.
- Cork 2–7 : 1–7 Kerry (17 July 1966 at FitzGerald Stadium) – In spite of some good performances Cork's victory over Kerry was a shock. ‘The Kingdom’ had dominated the provincial series for the previous decade and were hoping to capture a record-breaking ninth Munster title in-a-row. Cork got off to a shaky start, however, they got well on top in the second period of play. The introduction of veteran Niall FitzGerald, who had scored the winning point in Cork's last victory over Kerry nine years earlier, proved a match winner.
- Cork 5–12 : 1–15 Kerry (15 July 1973 at the Cork Athletic Grounds) – Despite inclement weather conditions up to 29,000 people thronged the Athletic Grounds for the last big game to be player there before its demolition. The game was not long in progress when it became obvious that Cork were heading for a rare rout. Five quick goals in the first forty minutes gave ‘the Rebels’ a merited 5–4 to 0–6 lead at the interval. Kerry launched a great comeback in the second-half; however, the gap could not be bridged as Cork won by 5–12 to 1–15. A first All-Ireland title in twenty-eight years later followed.
- Cork 3–10 : 3–9 Kerry (17 July 1983 at Páirc Uí Chaoimh) – After losing the famous five-in-a-row final to Offaly in 1982, Kerry were out to atone. Furthermore, they were out to set a new record by becoming the first team to win nine Munster titles in-a-row. In one of the great games between these two sides neither side took an extensive lead. As the game entered injury time Kerry were leading by two points. A dramatic last-minute goal by Tadhg Murphy gave Cork a merited 3–10 to 3–9 win. The game was a personal triumph for Dinny Allen who, after losing eight consecutive provincial deciders to Kerry, finally collected a winners' medal at the ninth attempt.
- Cork 2–7 : 1–10 Kerry (26 July 1987 at Páirc Uí Chaoimh) – Kerry were aiming to continue their dominance of the football world by claiming a twelfth Munster title in fourteen years. Furthermore, Kerry were on the quest for a second four-in-a-row of All-Ireland titles inside a decade. Cork, however, held a narrow lead for much of the game and were very much in control. Mikey Sheehy squeezed in a goal to give Kerry a one-point lead just on the stroke of seventy minutes. John Kerins's kick-out found John Cleary who kept possession before relaying to Christy Ryan. The resultant free was converted by Larry Tompkins, thus securing a draw.
- Cork 0–13 : 1–5 Kerry (2 August 1987 at FitzGerald Stadium) – A replay of the drawn Munster final and the end of an era for the greatest Gaelic football team of all-time. Cork established an early superiority and, in spite of playing against the wind, 'the Rebels' were eight points to the good at the interval. Kerry fought back in the second-half, however, there was never any doubt about the result. Cork were the winners with five points to spare and ended Kerry's hopes of a second four-in-a-row inside a decade.
- Cork 2–23 : 1–11 Kerry (1 July 1990 at Páirc Uí Chaoimh) – The annual Munster final saw Cork paired with Kerry once again. Kerry's fortunes had taken a nosedive since the heady days of the late 1970s and early 1980s, as Cork were now the kingpins of provincial football. This was best exemplified in the fact that Cork were aiming to capture a personal record of four Munster titles in-a-row. ‘The Rebels’ were severely hampered from the beginning as six regular players were on the injured list. The team that was picked showed their class and inflicted an unprecedented fifteen-point defeat on Kerry. The four-in-a-row was secure and an historic double would soon follow.
- Kerry 3–19 : 2–7 Cork (25 August 2002 at Croke Park) – An historic game in a rivalry that has been littered with historic games. While Cork and Kerry had been used to doing battle in Cork or Killarney, this was the first time that the sides had met in Croke Park, the headquarters of the GAA. Cork had earlier defeated Kerry after a replay before taking the Munster title after a replay as well. This game, in spite of all its promise, was a rout. Kerry trounced Cork by fifteen points.
- Kerry 3–13 : 1–9 Cork (16 September 2007 at Croke Park) – An historic all-Munster All-Ireland final, contested by possibly the two biggest rivals in the championship. Kerry, playing in a fourth championship decider in-a-row, were going for a second consecutive win, a feat last achieved by Cork in 1990. Kerry had narrowly beaten Cork in the Munster final earlier in the year, resulting in high expectations from a Cork viewpoint. While the first half was played on an even keel, 'the Kingdom' ran riot in the second half and a rout ensued. In a disastrous day for Cork football 'the Rebels' were trounced by 3–13 to 1–9.

== All-time results ==
=== Legend ===
Kerry win
Cork win
Match was a draw

=== Senior ===
No.	Date	Winners	Score	Runners-up	Venue	Stage
1.	27 July 1889	Cork	0-2 - 0-1	Kerry	Mallow Town Park	Munster semi-final
2.	28 September 1890	Cork	0-0 - 0-0	Kerry	Markets Field	Munster final
3.	19 October 1890	Cork	1-4 - 0-1	Kerry	Banteer Sportsfield	Munster final replay
4.	20 September 1891	Cork	2-5 - 0-2	Kerry	Killarney Sportsfield	Munster semi-final
5.	30 October 1892	Kerry	3-6 - 0-5	Cork	Killarney Sportsfield	Munster final
6.	2 April 1894	Cork	w/o - scr.	Kerry	Mallow Town Park	Munster final
7.	31 August 1902	Cork	0-6 - 0-1	Kerry	Markets Field	Munster quarter-final replay
8.	5 October 1902	Cork	0-8 - 0-6	Kerry	Millstreet Sportsfield	Munster quarter-final replay
9.	9 August 1903	Kerry	2-7 - 0-3	Cork	Millstreet Sportsfield	Munster semi-final
10.	30 October 1904	Kerry	1-7 - 0-3	Cork	Markets Field	Munster final
11.	29 October 1905	Kerry	1-4 - 0-0	Cork	Markets Field	Munster semi-final
12.	20 January 1907	Kerry	1-7 - 0-5	Cork	Cork Athletic Grounds	Munster final
13.	18 August 1907	Cork	1-10 - 0-3	Kerry	Station Road	Munster final
14.	29 March 1908	Cork	1-9 - 0-9	Kerry	Markets Field	Munster semi-final
15.	19 September 1909	Cork	2-8 - 1-7	Kerry	Markets Field	Munster final
16.	7 November 1909	Kerry	1-6 - 0-6	Cork	Cork Athletic Grounds	Munster final replay
17.	30 October 1910	Kerry	0-4 - 0-2	Cork	Cork Athletic Grounds	Munster final
18.	23 June 1912	Kerry	2-3 - 0-1	Cork	Tralee Sportsfield	Munster quarter-final
19.	26 October 1913	Kerry	1-6 - 0-1	Cork	Cork Athletic Grounds	Munster final
20.	4 October 1914	Kerry	0-5 - 0-1	Cork	Tralee Sportsfield	Munster final
21.	20 June 1920	Kerry	2-6 - 0-4	Cork	Cork Athletic Grounds	Munster semi-final
22.	2 September 1923	Kerry	3-4 - 0-3	Cork	Cork Athletic Grounds	Munster semi-final
23.	7 September 1924	Kerry	4-3 - 2-1	Cork	Cork Athletic Grounds	Munster semi-final
24.	16 August 1925	Kerry	3-8 - 0-1	Cork	Tralee Sportsfield	Munster semi-final
25.	18 July 1926	Kerry	1-9 - 2-1	Cork	Listowel Sportsfield	Munster semi-final
26.	8 May 1927	Kerry	1-7 - 0-1	Cork	Cork Athletic Grounds	Munster quarter-final
27.	26 May 1929	Kerry	1-7 - 1-3	Cork	The Mardyke	Munster semi-final
28.	27 May 1934	Kerry	2-6 - 0-3	Cork	Páirc Mac Gearailt	Munster quarter-final
29.	13 June 1937	Kerry	6-7 - 0-4	Cork	Fitzgerald Stadium	Munster quarter-final
30.	7 August 1938	Kerry	4-14 - 0-6	Cork	Clonakilty Sportsfield	Munster final
31.	19 July 1942	Kerry	3-7 - 0-8	Cork	Austin Stack Park	Munster final
32.	6 June 1943	Kerry	0-9 - 2-3	Cork	Cork Athletic Grounds	Munster semi-final
33.	11 July 1943	Cork	1-5 - 1-4	Kerry	Cork Athletic Grounds	Munster semi-final replay
34.	8 July 1945	Cork	1-11 - 1-6	Kerry	Fitzgerald Stadium	Munster final
35.	2 June 1946	Kerry	1-8 - 1-5	Cork	Fitzgerald Stadium	Munster quarter-final
36.	27 July 1947	Kerry	3-8 - 2-6	Cork	Cork Athletic Grounds	Munster final
37.	25 July 1948	Kerry	2-9 - 2-6	Cork	Fitzgerald Stadium	Munster final
38.	30 July 1950	Kerry	2-05 - 1-05	Cork	Cork Athletic Grounds	Munster final
39.	15 July 1951	Kerry	1-06 - 0-04	Cork	Fitzgerald Stadium	Munster final
40.	20 July 1952	Cork	0-11 - 0-02	Kerry	Cork Athletic Grounds	Munster final
41.	19 July 1953	Kerry	2-07 - 2-03	Cork	Fitzgerald Stadium	Munster final
42.	25 July 1954	Kerry	4-09 - 2-03	Cork	Cork Athletic Grounds	Munster final
43.	14 July 1955	Kerry	0-14 - 2-6	Cork	Fitzgerald Stadium	Munster final
44.	15 July 1956	Kerry	0-8 - 2-2	Cork	Cork Athletic Grounds	Munster final
45.	29 July 1956	Cork	1-8 - 1-7	Kerry	Fitzgerald Stadium	Munster final replay
46.	13 July 1958	Kerry	2-7 - 0-3	Cork	Cork Athletic Grounds	Munster final
47.	2 August 1959	Kerry	2-15 - 2-8	Cork	Fitzgerald Stadium	Munster final
48.	16 July 1961	Kerry	0-10 - 1-7	Cork	Cork Athletic Grounds	Munster final
49.	23 July 1961	Kerry	2-13 - 1-4	Cork	Fitzgerald Stadium	Munster final
50.	15 July 1962	Kerry	4-8 - 0-4	Cork	Cork Athletic Grounds	Munster final
51.	14 July 1963	Kerry	1-18 - 3-7	Cork	Fitzgerald Stadium	Munster final
52.	19 July 1964	Kerry	2-11 - 1-8	Cork	Cork Athletic Grounds	Munster final
53.	17 July 1966	Cork	2-07 - 1-07	Kerry	Fitzgerald Stadium	Munster final
54.	16 July 1967	Cork	0-08 - 0-07	Kerry	Cork Athletic Grounds	Munster final
55.	14 July 1968	Kerry	1-21 - 3-08	Cork	Fitzgerald Stadium	Munster final
56.	20 July 1969	Kerry	0-16 - 1-04	Cork	Cork Athletic Grounds	Munster final
57.	26 July 1970	Kerry	2-22 - 2-09	Cork	Fitzgerald Stadium	Munster final
58.	18 July 1971	Cork	0-25 - 0-14	Kerry	Cork Athletic Grounds	Munster final
59.	16 July 1972	Kerry	2-21 - 2-15	Cork	Fitzgerald Stadium	Munster final
60.	15 July 1973	Cork	5-12 - 1-15	Kerry	Cork Athletic Grounds	Munster final
61.	14 July 1974	Cork	1-11 - 0-07	Kerry	Fitzgerald Stadium	Munster final
62.	13 July 1975	Kerry	1-14 - 0-07	Cork	Fitzgerald Stadium	Munster final
63.	11 July 1976	Kerry	0-10 - 0-10	Cork	Páirc Uí Chaoimh	Munster final
64.	25 July 1976	Kerry	3-20 - 2-19	Cork	Páirc Uí Chaoimh	Munster final replay
65.	24 July 1977	Kerry	3-15 - 0-09	Cork	Fitzgerald Stadium	Munster final
66.	16 July 1978	Kerry	3-14 - 3-7	Cork	Páirc Uí Chaoimh	Munster final
67.	22 July 1979	Kerry	2-14 - 2-4	Cork	Fitzgerald Stadium	Munster final
68.	6 July 1980	Kerry	3-13 - 0-12	Cork	Páirc Uí Chaoimh	Munster final
69.	19 July 1981	Kerry	1-11 - 0-3	Cork	Fitzgerald Stadium	Munster final
70.	4 July 1982	Kerry	0-9 - 0-9	Cork	Páirc Uí Chaoimh	Munster final
71.	1 August 1982	Kerry	2-18 - 0-12	Cork	Fitzgerald Stadium	Munster final replay
72.	17 July 1983	Cork	3-10 - 3-9	Kerry	Páirc Uí Chaoimh	Munster final
73.	1 July 1984	Kerry	3-14 - 2-10	Cork	Fitzgerald Stadium	Munster final
74.	21 July 1985	Kerry	2-11 - 0-11	Cork	Páirc Uí Chaoimh	Munster final
75.	6 July 1986	Kerry	0-12 - 0-8	Cork	Fitzgerald Stadium	Munster final
76.	26 July 1987	Kerry	1-10 - 2-7	Cork	Páirc Uí Chaoimh	Munster final
77.	2 August 1987	Cork	0-13 - 1-5	Kerry	Fitzgerald Stadium	Munster final replay
78.	3 July 1988	Cork	1-14 - 0-16	Kerry	Páirc Uí Chaoimh	Munster final
79.	23 July 1989	Cork	1-12 - 1-09	Kerry	Fitzgerald Stadium	Munster final
80.	1 July 1990	Cork	2-23 - 1-11	Kerry	Páirc Uí Chaoimh	Munster final
81.	16 June 1991	Kerry	1-10 - 0-11	Cork	Fitzgerald Stadium	Munster semi-final
82.	4 May 1992	Kerry	2-14 - 0-10	Cork	Páirc Uí Chaoimh	Munster quarter-final
83.	20 June 1993	Cork	1-10 - 0-10	Kerry	Fitzgerald Stadium	Munster semi-final
84.	26 June 1994	Cork	1-13 - 2-08	Kerry	Páirc Uí Chaoimh	Munster semi-final
85.	23 July 1995	Cork	0-15 - 1-09	Kerry	Fitzgerald Stadium	Munster final
86.	21 July 1996	Kerry	0-14 - 0-11	Cork	Páirc Uí Chaoimh	Munster final
87.	5 July 1998	Kerry	1-14 - 1-11	Cork	Fitzgerald Stadium	Munster semi-final
88.	18 July 1999	Cork	2-10 - 2-4	Kerry	Páirc Uí Chaoimh	Munster final
89.	18 June 2000	Kerry	2-15 - 1-13	Cork	Fitzgerald Stadium	Munster final
90.	15 July 2001	Kerry	0-19 - 1-13	Cork	Páirc Uí Chaoimh	Munster final
91.	16 June 2002	Kerry	0-8 - 0-8	Cork	Fitzgerald Stadium	Munster semi-final
92.	23 June 2002	Cork	0-15 - 1-9	Kerry	Páirc Uí Chaoimh	Munster semi-final replay
93.	25 August 2002	Kerry	3-19 - 2-7	Cork	Croke Park	All-Ireland semi-final
94.	13 June 2004	Kerry	0-15 - 0-7	Cork	Páirc Uí Chaoimh	Munster semi-final
95.	10 July 2005	Kerry	1-11 - 0-11	Cork	Páirc Uí Chaoimh	Munster final
96.	28 August 2005	Kerry	1-19 - 0-9	Cork	Croke Park	All-Ireland semi-final
97.	9 July 2006	Kerry	0-10 - 0-10	Cork	Fitzgerald Stadium	Munster final
98.	16 July 2006	Cork	1-12 - 0-09	Kerry	Páirc Uí Chaoimh	Munster final replay
99.	20 August 2006	Kerry	0-16 - 0-10	Cork	Croke Park	All-Ireland semi-final
100.	1 July 2007	Kerry	1-15 - 1-13	Cork	Fitzgerald Stadium	Munster final
101.	16 September 2007	Kerry	3-13 - 1-09	Cork	Croke Park	All-Ireland final
102.	6 July 2008	Cork	1-16 - 1-11	Kerry	Páirc Uí Chaoimh	Munster final
103.	24 August 2008	Cork	3-07 - 1-13	Kerry	Croke Park	All-Ireland semi-final
104.	31 August 2008	Kerry	3-14 - 2-13	Cork	Croke Park	All-Ireland semi-final replay
105.	7 June 2009	Kerry	0-13 - 1-10	Cork	Fitzgerald Stadium	Munster semi-final
106.	13 June 2009	Cork	1-17 - 0-12	Kerry	Páirc Uí Chaoimh	Munster semi-final replay
107.	20 September 2009	Kerry	0-16 - 1-09	Cork	Croke Park	All-Ireland final
108.	6 June 2010	Kerry	0-15 - 0-15	Cork	Fitzgerald Stadium	Munster semi-final
109.	13 June 2010	Kerry	1-15 - 1-14	Cork	Páirc Uí Chaoimh	Munster semi-final replay
110.	3 July 2011	Kerry	1-15 - 1-12	Cork	Fitzgerald Stadium	Munster final
111.	10 June 2012	Cork	0-17 - 0-12	Kerry	Páirc Uí Chaoimh	Munster semi-final
112.	7 July 2013	Kerry	1-16 - 0-17	Cork	Fitzgerald Stadium	Munster final
113.	6 July 2014	Kerry	0-24 - 0-12	Cork	Páirc Uí Chaoimh	Munster final
114.	5 July 2015	Kerry	2-15 - 3-12	Cork	Fitzgerald Stadium	Munster final
115.	18 July 2015	Kerry	1-11 - 1-06	Cork	Fitzgerald Stadium	Munster final replay
116.	2 July 2017	Kerry	1-23 - 0-15	Cork	Fitzgerald Stadium	Munster final
117.	23 June 2018	Kerry	3-18 - 2-04	Cork	Páirc Uí Chaoimh	Munster final
118.	22 June 2019	Kerry	1-19 - 3-10	Cork	Páirc Uí Chaoimh	Munster final
119.	8 November 2020	Cork	1-12 - 0-13	Kerry	Páirc Uí Chaoimh	Munster semi-final
120.	25 July 2021	Kerry	4-22 - 1-09	Cork	Fitzgerald Stadium	Munster final
121.	7 May 2022	Kerry	0-23 - 0-11	Cork	Pairc Ui Rinn	Munster semi-final
122.	3 June 2023	Kerry	1-14 - 0-15	Cork	Pairc Ui Chaoimh	All Ireland Group Stage 1
123.	20 April 2024	Kerry	0-18 - 1-12	Cork	Fitzgerald Stadium	Munster semi-final
124.	19 April 2025	Kerry	3-21 - 1-25	Cork	Páirc Uí Chaoimh	Munster semi-final
125.	31 May 2025	Kerry	1-28 - 0-20	Cork	Páirc Uí Chaoimh	All Ireland Senior Football Championship Round 2
126.	10 May 2026	Kerry	1-23 - 1-15	Cork	Fitzgerald Stadium	Munster final

== Records ==
=== Scorelines ===
- Biggest championship win:
  - For Cork: Cork 2-23 - 1-11 Kerry, Munster final, Páirc Uí Chaoimh, 1 July 1990
  - For Kerry: Kerry 4-22 - 1-09 Cork, Munster final, Fitzgerald Stadium, 25 July 2021
- Highest aggregate:
  - Kerry 3-20 - 2-19 Cork, Munster final replay, Páirc Uí Chaoimh, 25 July 1976
