= 1990 All-Ireland Senior Football Championship =

Football championship

Championship details
- Dates: 6 May – 16 September 1990
- Teams: 32

All-Ireland Champions
- Winning team: Cork (6th win)
- Captain: Larry Tompkins
- Manager: Billy Morgan

All-Ireland Finalists
- Losing team: Meath
- Captain: Colm O'Rourke
- Manager: Seán Boylan

Provincial Champions
- Munster: Cork
- Leinster: Meath
- Ulster: Donegal
- Connacht: Roscommon

Championship statistics
- No. matches played: 32
- Top Scorer: Brian Stafford (1–24)
- Player of the Year: Shea Fahy

The 1990 All-Ireland Senior Football Championship was the 104th staging of the All-Ireland Senior Football Championship, the Gaelic Athletic Association's premier inter-county Gaelic football tournament. The championship began on 6 May 1990 and ended on 16 September 1990.

Was the final year of common Cork vs Kerry Munster finals stretch back to 1947 expect 4.

Cork entered the championship as the defending champions.

On 16 September 1990, Cork won the championship following an 0–11 to 0–9 defeat of Meath in the All-Ireland final. This was their sixth All-Ireland title and their second in succession.

Meath's Brian Stafford was the championship's top scorer with 1–24. Cork's Shea Fahy was the choice for Texaco Footballer of the Year.

== Championship draw ==
As a result of the Republic of Ireland football team qualifying for the 1990 FIFA World Cup, the Munster Council took precautions in avoiding a fixtures clash and a potential loss of revenue by changing the dates and times of their games.

== The championship ==
=== Format ===
==== Connacht Championship ====
Quarter-finals: (2 matches) These are two lone matches between the first four teams drawn from the province of Connacht. Two teams are eliminated at this stage, while the two winning teams advance to the semi-finals.

Semi-finals: (2 matches) The two winners of the two quarter-finals join the two remaining Connacht teams to make up the semi-final pairings. Two teams are eliminated at this stage, while the two winning two teams advance to the final.

Final: (1 match) The two winners of the two semi-finals contest this game. One team is eliminated at this stage, while the winners advance to the All-Ireland semi-final.

==== Leinster Championship ====
First round: (3 matches) These are three lone matches between the first six teams drawn from the province of Leinster. Three teams are eliminated at this stage, while the three winning teams advance to the quarter-finals

Quarter-finals: (4 matches) The three winners of the three first-round games join the five remaining Leinster teams to make up the semi-final pairings. Four teams are eliminated at this stage, while the four winning two teams advance to the semifinal.

Semi-finals: (2 matches) The four winners of the four quarter-finals contest this game. Two teams are eliminated at this stage, while the two winners advance to the final.

Final: (1 match) The two winners of the two semi-finals contest this game. One team is eliminated at this stage, while the winners advance to the All-Ireland semi-final.

==== Munster Championship ====
Quarter-finals: (2 matches) These are two lone matches between the first four teams drawn from the province of Munster. Two teams are eliminated at this stage, while the two winning teams advance to the semi-finals.

Semi-finals: (2 matches) The winners of the two quarter-finals join the two remaining Munster teams to make up the semi-final pairings. Two teams are eliminated at this stage, while the two winning two teams advance to the final.

Final: (1 match) The winners of the two semi-finals contest this game. One team is eliminated at this stage, while the winners advance to the All-Ireland semi-final.

==== Ulster Championship ====
First round: (1 match) This is a lone match between the first two teams drawn from the province of Ulster. One team is eliminated at this stage, while the winning team advances to the quarter-finals.

Quarter-finals: (4 matches) The winner of the lone first-round game join the seven remaining Ulster teams to make up the quarter-final pairings. Four teams are eliminated at this stage, while the four winning two teams advance to the semi-finals.

Semi-finals: (2 matches) The four winners of the four quarter-finals contest this game. Two teams are eliminated at this stage, while the two winners advance to the final.

Final: (1 match) The two winners of the two semi-finals contest this game. One team is eliminated at this stage, while the winners advance to the All-Ireland semi-final.

==== All-Ireland Championship ====
Semi-finals: (2 matches) The Munster champions play the Connacht champions in the first semi-final while the Leinster champions play the Ulster champions in the second semi-final. Two teams are eliminated at this stage, while the two winners advance to the All-Ireland final.

Final: (1 match) The winners of the two semi-finals contest the All-Ireland final.

== Fixtures ==
=== Connacht Senior Football Championship ===
==== Quarter-finals ====
June 3, 1990
Quarter-final

London	1–5 – 5–16	Roscommon
E. Duffy (1–0), J. Landy (0–3), N. McGinty (0–2).		T. McManus (2–8), E. McManus (2–2), V. Glennon (1–0), T. Grahan (0–2), P. McNeill (0–1), A. Leyland (0–1), M. Donlon (0–1), J. Newton (0–1).

Emerald Grounds, Ruislip

June 10, 1990
Quarter-final

Galway	6–18 – 0–4	Sligo
T. Kilcommins (2–4), V. Daly (1–3), D. Croucher (1–3), F. O'Neill (1–1), A. Mulholland (1–0), C. O'Dea (0–3), T. Mannion (0–2), M. Gavin (0–2).		F. Feeney (0–3), D. McGoldrick (0–1).

Pearse Stadium, Galway
Referee: J. Kearney (Roscommon)

==== Semi-finals ====
June 24, 1990
Semi-final

Roscommon	2–11 – 1–10	Leitrim
P. Earley (1–3), V. Glennon (1–0), A. Leyland (0–3), T. McManus (0–2), T. Crehan (0–1), M. Donlon (0–1), E. McManus (0–1).		C. Mahon (1–5), B. Breen (0–3), C. Dugdale (0–1), M. Martin (0–1).

Dr. Hyde Park, Roscommon
Attendance: 10,000
Referee: P. Egan (Galway)

July 1, 1990
Semi-final

Galway	2–11 – 1–12	Mayo
T. Kilcommins (0–5), F. O'Neill (1–1), A. Mulholland (1–0), V. Daly (0–2), T. Mannion (0–1), H. Bleahen (0–1), C. O'Dea (0–1).		M. Fitzmaurice (0–7), L. McHale (1–1), K. McStay (0–2), S. Grealish (0–1), A. Finnerty (0–1).

Tuam Stadium, Tuam
Referee: S. Prior (Leitrim)

==== Final ====
July 22, 1990
Final

Roscommon	0–16 – 1–11	Galway
E. McManus (0–5), P. Earley (0–4), T. Lennon (0–2), A. Leyland (0–1), J. Newton (0–1), T. McManus (0–1), V. Glennon (0–1), T. Crehan (0–1).		V. Daly (0–8), F. O'Neill (1–0), J. Fallon (0–2), T. Mannion (0–1).

Dr. Hyde Park, Roscommon
Attendance: 18,000
Referee: S. Prior (Leitrim)

=== Leinster Senior Football Championship ===
==== First round ====
May 13, 1990
First round

Carlow	2–7 – 3–8	Louth
J. Nevin (1–1), N. Molloy (1–0), M. Sibbald (0–1), G. Byrne (0–1), T. O'Brien (0–1), J. Owens (0–1), J. Hayden (0–1), M. Nolan (0–1).		S. White (2–2), M. Malone (1–0), C. O'Hanlon (0–3), N. Brown (0–1), S. O'Hanlon (0–1), G. Curran (0–1).

Dr. Cullen Park, Carlow
Referee: T. Howard (Kildare)

May 20, 1990
First round

Wexford	0–9 – 3–8	Kildare
B. Dodd (0–4), J. Power (0–2), T. Foran (0–2), M. Hanrick (0–1).		J. Crofton (2–1), T. Harris (1–0), J. Gilroy (0–3), D. Kerrigan (0–2), S. Dowling (0–1), P. O'Donoghue (0–1).

Wexford Park, Wexford
Referee: P. Moran (Laois)

May 20, 1990
First round

Westmeath	0–7 – 0–15	Longford
L. Giles (0–3), J. Fleming (0–1), T. Ormsby (0–1), A. Collins (0–1), L. Adamson (0–1).		J. McCormack (0–6), D. Barry (0–3), M. O'Hara (0–3), F. McNamee (0–2), K. O'Rourke (0–1).

Cusack Park, Mullingar
Referee: D. Guerin (Dublin)

==== Quarter-finals ====
June 3, 1990
Quarter-final

Louth	1–8 – 1–13	Dublin
G. Kelly (1–4), M. Malone (0–1), S. O'Hanlon (0–1), B. Kearns (0–1), G. Curran (0–1).		K. Duff (0–5), J. McNally (1–0), N. Clancy (0–3), M. Galvin (0–3), C. Redmond (0–1), D. Foran (0–1).

Drogheda Park, Drogheda
Attendance: 15,000
Referee: P. Kavanagh (Meath)

June 3, 1990
Quarter-final

Wicklow	1–7 – 0–6	Kildare
K. O'Brien (1–2), M. McHugh (0–2), F. Daly (0–2), M. Murtagh (0–1).		J. Gilroy (0–3), S. McGovern (0–1), T. Harris (0–1), D. Kerrigan (0–1).

Aughrim Park, Aughrim
Attendance: 6,000

June 10, 1990
Quarter-final

Laois	3–15 – 3–5	Offaly
M. Turley (2–7), J. O'Connell (1–0), E. Kelly (0–2), D. Lalor (0–2), L. Turley (0–1), E. Lacey (0–1), T. Maher (0–1), J. Nolan (0–1).		B. Lowry (2–1)< K. Kelleghan (1-1), J. Stewart (0-1), D. Kavanagh (0-1).M. Plunkett (0-1).

O'Moore Park, Portlaoise
Referee: S. Aldridge (Kildare)

June 10, 1990
Quarter-final

Meath	3–15 – 0–12	Longford
C. O'Rourke (2–5), L. Hayes (1–1), B. Stafford (0–4), B. Flynn (0–2), T. Dowd (0–2), D. Beggy (0–1).		D. Berry (0–7), J. McCormack (0–3), C. Lee (0–2).

Páirc Tailteann, Navan
Referee: T. Howard (Kildare)

==== Semi-finals ====
June 24, 1990
Semi-final

Dublin	2–14 – 0–12	Wicklow
J. McNally (2–0), K. Duff (0–5), E. Heary (0–3), N. Clancy (0–2), M. Galvin (0–1), N. Gulden (0–1), P. Clarke (0–1), N. McCaffrey (0–1).		F. Daly (0–4), R. McHugh (0–4), C. Daye (0–1), T. Allen (0–1), E. O'Brien (0–1), P. Baker (0–1).

St. Conleth's Park, Newbridge
Attendance: 8,000
Referee: T. Howard (Kildare)

July 1, 1990
Semi-final

Meath	4–14 – 0–6	Laois
B. Flynn (2–3), P. J. Gillic (1–2), B. Stafford (0–4), D. Beggy (1–0), S. Kelly (0–2), T. Dowd (0–1), C. O'Rourke (0–1), L. Hayes (0–1).		M. Turley (0–5), N. Rowe (0–1).

Croke Park, Dublin
Referee: D. Guerin (Dublin)

==== Final ====
July 29, 1990
Final

Meath	1–14 – 0–14	Dublin
B. Stafford (0–8), C. O'Rourke (1–1), B. Flynn (0–2), M. O'Connell (0–1), D. Beggy (0–1), P. J. Gillic (0–1).		B. Rock (0–5), P. Clarke (0–2), K. Duff (0–2), C. Redmond (0–1), L. Close (0–1), J. McNally (0–1), V. Murphy (0–1), K. Barr (0–1).

Croke Park, Dublin
Attendance: 53,847
Referee: P. Collins (Westmeath)

=== Munster Senior Football Championship ===
==== Quarter-finals ====
May 6, 1990
Quarter-final

Tipperary	1–6 – 1–12	Limerick
B. Burke (1–0), J. O'Meara (0–2), E. Maher (0–2), D. Hogan (0–1), M. Beston (0–1).		E. Sheehan (0–5), A. Carew (1–0), F. Ryan (0–3), L. O'Connell (0–2), T. Cummins (0–1), L. Long (0–1).

Ned Hall Park, Clonmel
Referee: J. J. Landers (Waterford)

May 6, 1990
Quarter-final

Waterford	0–9 – 0–13	Clare
E. O'Brien (0–3), J. McGrath (0–3), L. Dalton (0–1), C. Mac Craith (0–1).		A. O'Keeffe (0–3), T. O'Neill (0–2), F. McInerney (0–2), J. Murray (0–2), J. Enright (0–2), P. Harold (0–1), G. O'Keeffe (0–1).

Fraher Field, Dungarvan
Referee: R. Moloney (Limerick)

==== Semi-finals ====
May 27, 1990
Semi-final

Kerry	1–23 – 0–13	Clare
M. FitzGerald (0–9), S. Greaney (1–2), J. McElligott (0–4), J. Shannon (0–2), P. Laide (0–2), P. McKenna (0–2), J. O’Shea (0–1), D. McCarthy (0–1).		M. Flynn (0–4), A. O’Keeffe (0–3), T. O’Neill (0–3), F. McInerney (0–2), G. O’Keeffe (0–1).

Frank Sheehy Park, Listowel
Referee: P. Lane (Limerick)

May 27, 1990
Semi-final

Cork	4–15 – 1–3	Limerick
J. O'Driscoll (1–3), S. Fahy (1–2), J. Cleary (1–1), D. Barry (0–4), M. McCarthy (0–3), D. Culloty (1–0), M. Slocum (0–1), T. Davis (0–1).		O. Sheehan (1–1), F. Ryan (0–1), J. Cummins (0–1).

Páirc Uí Chaoimh, Cork
Attendance: 3,000
Referee: J. J. Landers (Waterford)

==== Final ====
July 1, 1990
Final

Cork	2–23 – 1–11	Kerry
C. O'Neill (0–11), L. Tompkins (0–5), M. McCarthy (1–0), D. Culloty (1–0), D. Barry (0–3), S. Fahy (0–2), P. Hayes (0–1), M. Slocum (0–1).		M. FitzGerald (1–5), P. Spillane (0–2), J. O'Shea (0–1), S. McElligott (0–1), P. Laide (0–1), T. Spillane (0–1).

Páirc Uí Chaoimh, Cork
Attendance: 40,065
Referee: P. Lane (Limerick)

=== Ulster Senior Football Championship ===
==== First round ====
May 13, 1990
First round

Monaghan	3–17 – 0–8	Antrim
R. McCarron (0–7), K. Hughes (1–3), G. McGurk (1–1), E. Murphy (1–0), E. McEneaney (0–3), M. McKenna (0–1), N. Marron (0–1), B. Murray (0–1).		P. McErlane (0–2), A. McQuillan (0–2), J. Kennedy (0–2), L. Harbinson (0–1), E. McAtamney (0–1).

St. Mary's Park, Castleblaney
Referee: J. Curran (Tyrone)

==== Quarter-finals ====
May 20, 1990
Quarter-final

Donegal	0–13 – 0–9	Cavan
M. Boyle (0–7), C. Mulgrew (0–2), M. Gavigan (0–1), J. McHugh (0–1), D. Bonner (0–1), G. Curran (0–1).		R. Carolan (0–7), S. King (0–1), P. Smyth (0–1).

MacCumhaill Park, Ballybofey
Referee: S. Murray (Monaghan)

May 27, 1990
Quarter-final

Derry	4–14 – 1–7	Fermanagh
D. Cassidy (2–3), F. McCusker (1–1), E. Gormley (0–4), E. Young (1–0), S. Downey (0–2), D. Barton (0–2), P. Barton (0–1), P. Murphy (0–1).		M. O'Rourke (1–6), J. Reihill (0–1).

Celtic Park, Derry
Referee: J. Gough (Antrim)

June 3, 1990
Quarter-final

Armagh	0–12 – 0–11	Tyrone
J. Toner (0–4), K. McGurk (0–3), S. Skelton (0–2), G. Houlihan (0–1), J. McConville (0–1), M. McQuillan (0–1).		Peter Canavan (0–5), A. Cush (0–4), D. O'Hagan (0–2).

Athletic Grounds, Armagh
Referee: D. Campbell (Fermanagh)

June 10, 1990
Quarter-final

Down	3–11 – 1–12	Monaghan
C. Murray (1–6), A. Rodgers (1–1), J. McCartan (1–0), J. Trainor (0–3), P. Higgins (0–1).		E. McEneaney (0–7), K. Hughes (1–1), R. McCarron (0–2), S. McGinnitty (0–1), G. McGuirk (0–1).

Páirc Esler, Newry
Referee: M. Greenan (Cavan)

==== Semi-finals ====
June 17, 1990
Semi-final

Donegal	1–15 – 0–8	Derry
M. Boyle (1–4), D. Bonnar (0–4), M. McHugh (0–2), J. McMullan (0–2), B. Murray (0–1), J. McHugh (0–1), C. Mulgrew (0–1).		E. Gormley (0–6), J. Brolly (0–1), B. McGilligan (0–1).

St. Tiernach's Park, Clones
Attendance: 5,000
Referee: M. Cranny (Down)

June 24, 1990
Semi-final

Down	2–10 – 1–13	Armagh
J. McCartan (2–0), J. Treanor (0–5), C. Murray (0–3), A. Rodgers (0–1), R. Carr (0–1).		K. McGurk (1–2), J. Toner (0–4), G. Houlihan (0–3), M. McQuillan (0–2), O. Reel (0–1), S. Skelton (0–1).

Casement Park, Belfast
Attendance: 10,000
Referee: J. Curran (Tyrone)

July 1, 1990
Semi-final replay

Armagh	2–7 – 0–12	Down
K. McGurk (1–2), N. Smyth (1–0), J. Toner (0–3), L. McGeary (0–1), M. Grimley (0–1).		P. McCartan (0–3), C. Murray (0–3), M. Linden (0–2), J. Treanor (0–2), J. McCartan (0–1), A. Rodgers (0–1).

Casement Park, Belfast
Attendance: 10,000
Referee: J. Curran (Tyrone)

==== Final ====
July 15, 1990
Final

Donegal	0–15 – 0–14	Armagh
M. Boyle (0–5), M. McHugh (0–4), D. Bonnar (0–2), T. Ryan (0–1), D. Reid (0–1), M. Shovlin (0–1), B. Murray (0–1).		O. Reel (0–4), S. Skelton (0–3), G. Houlihan (0–2), K. McGurk (0–2), J. McConville (0–1), J. Toner (0–1), M. Grimley (0–1).

St. Tiernach's Park, Clones
Attendance: 20,000
Referee: D. Campbell (Fermanagh)

=== All-Ireland series ===
==== Semi-finals ====
August 12, 1990
Semi-final

Cork	0–17 – 0–10	Roscommon
L. Tomkins (0–5), C. O'Neill (0–3), M. McCarthy (0–3), P. McGrath (0–2), P. Hayes (0–1), S. O'Brien (0–1), M. Slocum (0–1), T. Nation (0–1).		V. Glennon (0–2), T. Grehan (0–2), T. McManus (0–2), M. Donlon (0–1), T. Lennon (0–1), P. Eraley (0–1), J. Connaughton (0–1).

Croke Park, Dublin
Attendance: 33,165
Referee: D. Campbell (Fermanagh)

August 19, 1990
Semi-final

Meath	3–9 – 1–7	Donegal
B. Flynn (2–2), B. Stafford (1–2), P. J. Gillic (0–4), D. Beggy (0–1).		M. Boyle (1–2), D. Bonner (0–3), T. Boyle (0–1), M. McHugh (0–1).

Croke Park, Dublin
Attendance: 40,243
Referee: P. Russell (Tipperary)

==== Final ====
September 16, 1990
Final

Cork	0–11 – 0–09	Meath
S. Fahy (0–4), L. Tompkins (0–4), M. McCarthy (0–2), P. McGrath (0–1).		B. Stafford (0–6), B. Flynn (0–1), C. Coyle (0–1), D. Beggy (0–1).

Croke Park, Dublin
Attendance: 65,898
Referee: P. Russell (Tipperary)

== Championship Statistics ==
=== Miscellaneous ===
- Laois beat Offaly for the first time since 1968.
- Roscommon play Leitrim in the Connacht championship for the first time since 1975.
- The final year of seeding system in the Munster championship unitl 2008.
- The Munster final was between Cork vs Kerry for the 25th year in a row and for the 40th time since 1947 in total.
- There were a number of first-time championship meetings. Both All Ireland semi-finals were the first Championship meetings of Cork vs Roscommon & Meath vs Donegal.
- Cork became the first Munster team not Kerry to retain the All Ireland title and won their 4th Munster title in a row and were the first county since Tipperary in 1900 to be both All Ireland Champions in football and hurling 100 years after their first one also Tipperary in 1895, 1900, Cork in 1890 and 1990 were All Ireland football and hurling champions in the same season.

=== Top scorers ===
Overall

Rank	Player	County	Tally	Total	Matches	Average
1	Brian Stafford	Meath	1–24	27	5	5.40
2	Manus Boyle	Donegal	2–18	24	4	6.00
3	Bernard Flynn	Meath	4–10	22	5	4.40
4	Maurice Fitzgerald	Kerry	1–14	17	2	8.50
5	Val Daly	Galway	1–13	16	3	5.33

Single game

Rank	Player	County	Tally	Total	Opposition
1	Tony McManus	Roscommon	2–8	14	London
2	Colm O'Rourke	Meath	2–5	11	Longford
3	Tadhg Kilcommins	Galway	2–4	10	Sligo
4	Damian Cassidy	Derry	2–3	9	Fermanagh
4	Bernard Flynn	Meath	2–3	9	Laois
4	Cathal Murray	Down	1–6	9	Monaghan
4	Malachy O'Rourke	Fermanagh	1–6	9	Derry
4	Maurice Fitzgerald	Kerry	0–9	9	Clare
9	Owen McManus	Roscommon	2–2	8	London
9	Stefan White	Louth	2–2	8	Carlow
9	Bernard Flynn	Meath	2–2	8	Donegal
9	Ciaran Mahon	Leitrim	1–5	8	Roscommon
9	Maurice Fitzgerald	Kerry	1–5	8	Cork
9	Val Daly	Galway	0–8	8	Roscommon
9	Brian Stafford	Meath	0–8	8	Dublin
