= Paul Grimley =

Gaelic football manager

Paul Grimley is the former manager of the Gaelic football team Armagh county.

Grimley arrived at Armagh as Paddy O'Rourke's assistant, and remained in the role for a year before becoming manager following O'Rourke's resignation in July 2012. After two years in the role, Grimley resigned as Armagh's manager on August 13, 2014, replaced by his former boss from Kildare, Kieran McGeeney.

In an 'unprecedented' move, Grimley issued a public apology statement to the fans forum on the Armagh's GAA's official website in 2013, following a four-point defeat to Cavan county in the Ulster championship.

Grimley was involved in management for 13 years. He had previously served as assistant to Kieran McGeeney after McGeeney was appointed manager of the Kildare county team in 2007.

Grimley criticised the media's 'witch hunt' for Gaelic football player Tiernan Kelly over an eye-gouging incident in the All-Ireland quarter-final between Armagh and Galway in June 2022.
