= 1987 All-Ireland Senior Football Championship =

Football championship

Championship details
- Dates: 17 May – 20 September 1987
- Teams: 32

All-Ireland Champions
- Winning team: Meath (4th win)
- Captain: Mick Lyons
- Manager: Seán Boylan

All-Ireland Finalists
- Losing team: Cork
- Captain: Conor Counihan
- Manager: Billy Morgan

Provincial Champions
- Munster: Cork
- Leinster: Meath
- Ulster: Derry
- Connacht: Galway

Championship statistics
- No. matches played: 37
- Top Scorer: Larry Tompkins (0–38)
- Player of the Year: Brian Stafford

The 1987 All-Ireland Senior Football Championship was the 101st staging of the All-Ireland Senior Football Championship, the Gaelic Athletic Association's premier inter-county Gaelic football tournament. The championship began on 17 May 1987 and ended on 20 September 1987.

Kerry entered the championship as the defending champions, however, they were defeated by Cork in a Munster final replay.

On 20 September 1987, Meath won the championship following a 1–14 to 0–11 defeat of Cork in the All-Ireland final. This was their 4th All-Ireland title, their first since 1967.

Cork's Larry Tompkins was the championship's top scorer with 0–38. Meath's Brian Stafford was the choice for Texaco Footballer of the Year.

== Results ==
=== Connacht Senior Football Championship ===
Quarter-finals

31 May 1987 Quarter-final	Sligo	2–8 – 0–12	Roscommon	Markievicz Park, Sligo
	D McDonagh 0–5, A Brennan 1–0, M Laffey 1–0, D Cummins 0–1, D McGoldrick 0–1, R Henneberry 0–1.		P McNeill 0–3, P Earley 0–3, E McManus Jnr. 0–2, A Garvey 0–1, B Flynn 0–1.	Referee: S Prior (Leitrim)

31 May 1987 Quarter-final	London	1–8 – 1–12	Leitrim	Emerald GAA Grounds, Ruislip
	D Corrigan 1–2, B Herlihy 0–3, C Harney 0–1, L Lacey 0–1, B Hughes 0–1.		C McMahon 0–4, P Kieran 1–0, B Breen 0–3, B Doyle 0–2, S Mulhern 0–1, T Quirke 0–1.	Referee: P Egan (Galway)

Semi-finals

14 June 1987 Semi-final	Leitrim	0–10 – 1–10	Galway	Páirc Sheáin Mhic Dhiarmada, Carrick-on-Shannon
	B Breen 0–5, M Martin 0–3, C Mahon 0–1, O Honeyman 0–1.		B O'Donnell 0–4, J Joyce 1–0, V Daly 0–2, B Brennan 0–2, G McManus 0–1, G Burke 0–1.	Referee: M Kearns (Sligo)

21 June 1987 Semi-final	Mayo	3–17 – 0–6	Sligo	MacHale Park, Castlebar
	L McHale 1–4, L Niland 1–2, P Brogan 1–2, K McStay 0–4, A Finnerty 0–2, N Durkin 0–2, F Noone 0–1.		D McDonagh 0–3, S Durkin 0–1, J Gorham 0–1, John Kent 0–1.	Attendance: 12,000; Referee: S Prior (Leitrim)

Final

12 July 1987 Final	Mayo	0–7 – 0–8	Galway	MacHale Park, Castlebar
	P Brogan 0–4, L Niland 0–1, M Carney 0–1, D Kearney 0–1.		V Daly 0–3, J Joyce 0–2, S Joyce 0–1, G McManus 0–1, B Talty 0–1.	Attendance: 25,000; Referee: S Prior (Leitrim)

=== Leinster Senior Football Championship ===
Preliminary round

24 May 1987 Preliminary round	Kildare	0–14 – 2–6	Wexford	St. Conleth's Park, Newbridge
	M Shaw 0–4, B Nolan 0–4, A McLoughlin 0–3, D Kerrigan 0–1, C Moran 0–1, L McLoughlin 0–1.		J McGovern 1–1, M Hanrick 1–1, J Byrne 0–1, B Gorman 0–1, L Rafter 0–1, P Bardon 0–1.	Referee: P Kavanagh (Meath)

24 May 1987 Preliminary round	Longford	0–8 – 0–13	Louth	Pearse Park, Longford
	J McCormack 0–4, L Tierney 0–1, P Carberry 0–1, D Barry 0–1, K O'Rourke 0–1.		S Reid 0–4, E Judge 0–3, J McDonnell 0–3, S O'Hanlon 0–2, P O'Connor 0–1.	Referee: P Collins (Westmeath)

24 May 1987 Preliminary round	Laois	1–12 – 2–7	Carlow	O'Moore Park, Portlaoise
	G Lawlor 1–1, L Turley 0–3, G Browne 0–2, T Prendergast 0–2, L Irwin 0–1, N Prendergast 0–1, M Drennan 0–1, C Browne 0–1.		W Doyle 1–1, K Madden 1–1, J Hayden 0–3, L Kearns 0–1, J Owens 0–1.	Attendance: 8,786; Referee: D Guerin (Dublin)

Quarter-finals

7 June 1987 Quarter-final	Offaly	1–8 – 1–8	Kildare	O'Connor Park, Tullamore
	B Lowry 0–4, J Mooney 1–0, K Dunne 0–2, P O'Shea 0–1, J Guinan 0–1.		B Nolan 0–5, P McLoughlin 1–1, M Shaw 0–1, D Kerrigan 0–1.	Attendance: 7,000; Referee: D Guerin (Dublin)

7 June 1987 Quarter-final	Dublin	0–14 – 0–5	Westmeath	Croke Park, Dublin
	B Rock 0–11, K Dugg 0–2, J McNally 0–1.		L Giles 0–4, A O'Halloran 0–1.	Referee: C Buckley (Offaly); Man of the Match: Jim Ronayne (Clontarf)

14 June 1987 Quarter-final	Wicklow	1–7 – 0–8	Louth	Aughrim Park, Aughrim
	R Griffin 1–1, P Baker 0–2, R McHugh 0–2, P O'Byrne 0–1, A O'Sullivan 0–1.		R Culhane 0–4, J McDonnell 0–1, D McDonnell 0–1, S O'Hanlon 0–1, J McDonnell 0–1..	Referee: S Kelly (Carlow)

14 June 1987 Quarter-final replay	Kildare	1–12 – 0–10	Offaly	St. Conleth's Park, Newbridge
	B Donovan 1–1, D Kerrigan 0–3, P McLoughlin 0–3, B Noaln 0–2, C Moran 0–1, S McGovern 0–1, M Shaw 0–1.		B Lowry 0–6, V Byrne 0–1, V Claffey 0–1, J Mooney 0–1, P Mollen 0–1.	Attendance: 15,000; Referee: D Guerin (Dublin)

14 June 1987 Quarter-final	Laois	2–5 – 1–11	Meath	O'Moore Park, Portlaoise
	L Irwin 1–2, C Browne 1–0, T Prendergast 0–2, G Lawlor 0–1.		B Stafford 0–7, C O'Rourke 1–0, B Flynn 0–2, D Beggy 0–1, J Cassells 0–1.	Referee: J Woods (Dublin)

Semi-finals

28 June 1987 Semi-final	Meath	0–15 – 0–9	Kildare	O'Connor Park, Tullamore
	B Stafford 0–10, J Cassells 0–3, B Flynn 0–1, D Beggy 0–1.		P McLaughlin 0–5, B Donovan 0–1, J Crofton 0–1, M Shaw 0–1, C Moran 0–1.	Referee: T Ó Reachtabhra (Dublin)

5 July 1987 Semi-final	Dublin	2–18 – 0–6	Wicklow	St. Conleth's Park, Newbridge
	B Rock 0–8, A McCaul 1–3, D de Lappe 1–2, M Galvin 0–2, D Bolger 0–2, D Synnott 0–1.		R McHugh 0–3, S Morris 0–1, P O'Byrne 0–1, A O'Sullivan 0–1.	Attendance: 17,000; Referee: S Aldridge (Kildare)

Final

26 July 1987 Final	Meath	1–13 – 0–12	Dublin	Croke Park, Dublin
	Brian Stafford 0–6 (0-5f) Mattie McCabe 1–2, Colm O'Rourke and Finian Murtagh 0–2 each, David Beggy 0–1.		Barney Rock 0–4 (0-3f), Noel McCaffrey and Joe McNally 0–2 each, Declan Bolger, Charlie Redmond, Mick Gavin, Anto McCaul 0–1 each	Attendance: 48,122; Referee: Seamus Aldridge (Kildare)

=== Munster Senior Football Championship ===
Quarter-finals

17 May 1987 Quarter-final	Limerick	0–12 – 0–11	Tipperary	Páirc na nGael, Askeaton
	A Moran 0–4, L Long 0–3, T Fitzgibbon 0–2, F Ryan 0–2, N Quane 0–1.		A Helay 0–3, J O'Meara 0–2, P Kilkenny 0–2, G McGrath 0–1, M Cunningham 0–1, T Sheehan 0–1, B Burke 0–1.	Referee: T Maher (Waterford)

17 May 1987 Quarter-final	Waterford	2–9 – 2–9	Clare	Fraher Field, Dungarvan
	J McGrath 2–2, P Whyte 0–3, E O'Brien 0–2, J Maher 0–1, L Dalton 0–1.		J O@Connor 2–1, A O'Keeffe 0–3, C O'Donoghue 0–2, F McInerney 0–1, F Griffin 0–1, F Fitzpatrick 0–1.	Referee: T Sugrue (Kerry)

31 May 1987 Quarter-final replay	Clare	0–16 – 2–12	Waterford	Cusack Park, Ennis
	A O'Keeffe 0–5, F McInerney 0–3, J O'Connor 0–2, G Killeen 0–2, S Burke 0–1, P Burke 0–1, N Normoyle 0–1, G O'Keeffe 0–1.		E O'Brien 1–7, J Maher 1–3, L O'Connor 0–1.	Referee: T Sugrue (Kerry)

Semi-finals

21 June 1987 Semi-final	Cork	1–14 – 0–11	Limerick	Páirc Uí Chaoimh, Cork
	C O'Neill 1–1, L Tompkins 0–4, J Cleary 0–3, P Hayes 0–2, J O'Driscoll 0–2, T Leahy 0–1, S Fahy 0–1.		T Cummins 0–3, A Moran 0–3, W Roche 0–2, T Fitzgibbon 0–2, L Long 0–1.

21 June 1987 Semi-final	Waterford	2–8 – 3–15	Kerry	Fraher Field, Dungarvan
	D Casey 1–0, L O'Connor 1–0, J McGrath 0–2, E O'Brien 0–2, J Maher 0–2, P Whyte 0–1, P Curran 0–1.		J O'Shea 2–1, E Liston 0–5, G Power 1–1, D Moran 0–4, P Spillane 0–3, W Maher 0–1.	Referee: P Lane (Limerick)

Finals

26 July 1987 Final	Cork	1–10 – 2–7	Kerry	Páirc Uí Chaoimh, Cork
	L Tompkins 0–8, J O'Driscoll 1–1, C Ryan 0–1.		M Sheehy 1–4, E Liston 1–0, J O'Shea 0–2, D Moran 0–1.	Referee: P Lane (Limerick)

2 August 1987 Final replay	Kerry	1–5 – 0–13	Cork	Fitzgerald Stadium, Killarney
	D Hanafin 1–0, J O'Shea 0–2, M Sheehy 0–1, V O'Connor 0–1, T Doyle 0–1.		L Tompkins 0–3, T Davis 0–2, S Fahy 0–2, J Cleary 0–2, D Culloty 0–1, T McCarthy 0–1, T Nation 0–1, J O'Driscoll 0–1.	Attendance: 49,358; Referee: P Lane (Limerick)

=== Ulster Senior Football Championship ===
Preliminary round

17 May 1987 Preliminary round	Armagh	2–9 – 0–9	Fermanagh	Athletic Grounds, Armagh
	K McGuirk 1–1, J Kernan 1–1, J McConville 0–3, D Seeley 0–2, J Rafferty 0–1, D McCoy 0–1.		F McGuinness 0–3, P McGinnity 0–2, P Coyle 0–2, B McCreash 0–1, T Maguire 0–1.	Referee: D Slater (Tyrone)

Quarter-finals

24 May 1987 Quarter-final	Cavan	0–12 – 0–10	Monaghan	Breffni Park, Cavan
	R Carolan 0–4, M Faulkner 0–3, P McKiernan 0–1, S King 0–1, J Reilly 0–1, N O'Donnell 0–1, R Cullivan 0–1.		R McCarron 0–3, B Murray 0–2, E Hughes 0–2, S White 0–1, E McEneaney 0–1, K Carragher 0–1.	Attendance: 17,000; Referee: J Gough (Antrim)

31 May 1987 Quarter-final	Down	2–7 – 1–12	Derry	Páirc Esler, Newry
	J Treanor 1–1, B Mason 1–1, G Blaney 0–2, A Rodgers 0–2, L Heaney 0–1.		E Gormley 0–8, D Cassidy 1–0, P Kealey 0–1, T McGuckian 0–1, D McNicholl 0–1, P Murphy 0–1.	Attendance: 6,000; Referee: D Campbell (Fermanagh)

7 June 1987 Quarter-final	Antrim	0–9 – 0–9	Tyrone	Casement Park, Belfast
	M Daragh 0–4, S Mulvanna 0–2, F Fitzsimons 0–2, B White 0–1.		D O'Hagan 0–3, S Conway 0–2, K McCabe 0–1, B Grugan 0–1, I Gallagher 0–1, P Donaghy 0–1.	Referee: M Greenan (Cavan)

14 June 1987 Quarter-final replay	Tyrone	2–6 – 2–5	Antrim	Healy Park, Omagh
	P Quinn 1–2, D O'Hagan 1–0, S Conway 0–2, P Donaghy 0–1, P Ball 0–1.		M Daragh 1–5, D Armstrong 1–0.	Referee: M Greenan (Cavan)

14 June 1987 Quarter-final	Donegal	0–6 – 1–8	Armagh	MacCumhaill Park, Ballybofey
	M Boyle 0–3, J McMullen 0–1, D Bonner 0–1, S Maguire 0–1.		G Houlihan 1–2, J McConville 0–3, J Kernan 0–1, N Smyth 0–1, M Toye 0–1.	Attendance: 8,000; Referee: S Murray (Monaghan)

Semi-finals

21 June 1987 Semi-final	Derry	2–7 – 1–10	Cavan	Healy Park, Omagh
	D McNicholl 1–1, D Barton 1–0, B McGilligan 0–2, B Gormley 0–2, J Irwin 0–1, P Murphy 0–1.		S King 1–2, R Carolan 0–5, M Faulkner 0–1, R Cullivan 0–1, N O'Donnell 0–1.	Attendance: 14,000; Referee: M Cranney (Down)

28 June 1987 Semi-final	Armagh	5–9 – 1–9	Tyrone	St. Molaise Park, Irvinestown
	D Seeley 1–2, J McConville 1–2, B Skelton 1–1, C Houlihan 1–1, M McQuillan 1–0, P Grimley 0–2, J McKerr 0–1.		S Conway 0–4, E McKenna 1–0, M McClure 0–2, K McCabe 0–1, P Quinn 0–1, T McCann 0–1.	Attendance: 13,000; Referee: J Gough (Antrim)

5 July 1987 Semi-final replay	Derry	2–11 – 2–8	Cavan	Healy Park, Omagh
	E Gormley 0–7, P Murphy 1–1, P Kealey 1–0, D McNicholl 0–1, D Barton 0–1, D Cassidy 0–1.		J Brady 2–1, N O'Donnell 0–3, R Carolan 0–2, M Faulkner 0–2.	Referee: M Cranny (Down)

Final

19 July 1987 Final	Derry	0–11 – 0–9	Armagh	St. Tiernach's Park, Clones
	E Gormley 0–3, D Cassidy 0–2, B Kealey 0–2, D McNicholl 0–1, T Scullion 0–1, J Irwin 0–1, B McGilligan 0–1.		B Skelton 0–3, J McConville 0–2, G Hoilihan 0–2, D Seeley 0–1, J McKerr 0–1.	Attendance: 30,000; Referee: D Campbell (Fermanagh)

=== All-Ireland Senior Football Championship ===
Semi-finals

16 August 1987 Semi-final	Cork	1–11 – 1–11	Galway	Croke Park, Dublin
	L Tompkins 0–6, P Hayes 1–0, J Cleary 0–3, J O'Driscoll 0–1, S Fahy 0–1.		G McManus 0–5, V Daly 1–1, B Brennan 0–3, J Fallon 0–1, J Joyce 0–1.	Attendance: 20,229; Referee: C Buckley (Offaly)

23 August 1987 Semi-final	Meath	0–15 – 0–8	Derry	Croke Park, Dublin
	B Stafford 0–4, B Flynn 0–4, C O'Rourke 0–3, J Cassells 0–2, L Hayes 0–1, D Beggy 0–1.		E Gormely 0–4, J Irwin 0–2, D Barton 0–1, P Kealey 0–1.	Attendance: 40,285; Referee: P Lane (Limerick)

30 August 1987 Semi-final replay	Cork	0–18 – 1–4	Galway	Croke Park, Dublin
	L Tompkins 0–11, C O'Neill 0–4, J Kerrigan 0–1, J Cleary 0–1, J O'Driscoll 0–1.		B Brennan 1–0, G McManus 0–3, S Joyce 0–1.	Attendance: 26,285; Referee: C Buckley (Offaly)

Final

20 September 1987 Final	Meath	1–14 – 0–11	Cork	Croke Park, Dublin
	B Stafford 0–7, C O'Rourke 1–1, D Beggy 0–3, G McEntee 0–1, B Flynn 0–1, PJ Gillic 0–1.		L Tompkins 0–6, J Cleary 0–1, C Ryan 0–1, N Cahalane 0–1, J O'Driscoll 0–1, C O'Neill 0–1.	Attendance: 68,431; Referee: P Lane (Limerick)

== Championship statistics ==
=== Top scorers ===
Overall

Rank	Player	County	Tally	Total	Matches	Average
1	Larry Tompkins	Cork	0–38	38	6	6.33
2	Brian Stafford	Meath	0–33	33	5	6.60
3	Barney Rock	Dublin	0–23	23	3	7.66
4	Enda Gormley	Derry	0–22	22	4	5.50
5	Eoin O'Brien	Waterford	1–11	14	3	4.66

Single game

Rank	Player	County	Tally	Total	Opposition
1	Barney Rock	Dublin	0–11	11	Westmeath
1	Larry Tompkins	Cork	0–11	11	Galway
3	Eoin O'Brien	Waterford	1–7	10	Clare
3	Brian Stafford	Meath	0–10	10	Kildare
5	Jim McGrath	Waterford	2–2	8	Clare
5	Mickey Daragh	Antrim	1–5	8	Tyrone
5	Barney Rock	Dublin	0–8	8	Wicklow
5	Larry Tompkins	Cork	0–8	8	Kerry
5	Enda Gormley	Derry	0–8	8	Down
10	John O'Connor	Clare	2–1	7	Waterford
10	Jack O'Shea	Kerry	2–1	7	Waterford
10	John Brady	Cavan	2–1	7	Derry
10	Mikey Sheehy	Kerry	1–4	7	Cork
10	Liam McHale	Mayo	1–4	7	Sligo
10	Brian Stafford	Meath	0–7	7	Laois
10	Enda Gormley	Derry	0–7	7	Cavan
10	Brian Stafford	Meath	0–7	7	Cork

=== Miscellaneous ===
- On 17 May 1987, Páirc na nGael, Askeaton hosted its first championship game for 17 years the Munster football Quarter-Final game between Tippearay vs Limerick.
- Waterford beat Clare for the first time since 1958 after a Replay.
- Derry win the Ulster Championship for the first time since 1976.
- The All-Ireland semi-final between Meath and Derry was the very first championship meeting of the two sides.
- The All-Ireland final saw Meath qualify for the decider for the first time since 1970, while Cork were appearing in the showpiece for the first time since 1973. It was their second ever championship meeting and their first since 1967.
