= Paddy O'Rourke (Down footballer) =

Irish Gaelic footballer and manager

Personal information
- Native name: Pádraig Ó Ruairc (Irish)
- Born: Burren, County Down
- Height: 6 ft 2 in (188 cm)

Sport
- Sport: Gaelic football
- Position: Right half back
Club
- Years: Club
- 1976-1995: Burren
Club titles
- Down titles: 8
- Ulster titles: 5
- All-Ireland Titles: 2
Inter-county
- Years: County
- 1978 1992: Down
Inter-county titles
- Ulster titles: 3
- All-Irelands: 1
- NFL: 1
- All Stars: 0

Paddy O'Rourke (born 1960 in Burren, County Down) is an Irish Gaelic football manager and former player. He played football with his local club Burren and was a member of the Down senior inter-county team from the 1970s until the 1990s. O'Rourke captained Down to the All-Ireland title in 1991. He managed the Armagh senior football team from 2009 top 2012. Paddy's son Pauric was part of the Down minor team in 2008 and Under-21 team in 2010.

== Minor & Under 21 ==
O'Rourke joined the Down Minor team in 1977 Down made it to the Ulster Minor Final where Down played Armagh the first game was a draw 0-08 to 1-05 Down would win the replay 0-11 to 1-06 giving O'Rourke his first and only Ulster medal Down made it the All-Ireland Final where Down Played Meath Down won 2-06 to 0-04 giving Paddy an All-Ireland he was the caption of the team in 1978 but Down got beat by Tyrone in the semi-final. Paddy was part of the Down under 21 team that won 3 Ulster Under-21 Football Championship in a row 1977 1978 1979 Down made it the 2 finals of the All-Ireland Under-21 Football Championship 1977 and 1979 Down were beat in 1977 by Kerry in the final. Down made it 2 Ulster Under-21s in a row beating Cavan for the 2nd year in a row in the final 0-11 to 1-06 Down were beat in the All-Ireland semi-final 1979 saw Down take the honours in Ulster for the 3rd year in a row beating Tyrone 1-09 to 0-05 Down would later win the All-Ireland beating Cork in the final 1-09 to 0-07 giving paddy his first and only All-Ireland Under-21 medal.

== Senior ==
O'Rourke joined the Down senior team in 1978, winning an Ulster title by beating Cavan in the final 2-19 to 2-12. O'Rourke was a substitute. He came on in the semi-final. Down were beat by Dublin 1-16 to 0-08.

In 1981 Down played Monaghan in the first round of the Ulster Championship. It was a draw at 0-10 to 0-10. Down won the replay 3-4 to 1-9, O'Rourke scoring 0-1. Down played Derry in the semi-final. It was a close game. Down won 0-12 to 0-9. Down were through to the Ulster Final where they faced raining Ulster champions and archrivals Armagh. Down would win the game 3-12 to 1-10, a second Ulster winners' medal. Down were beat by Dublin in the All-Ireland semi-final 1-16 to 0-8.

O'Rourke won his first and only National Football League Division 1 in 1983, beating Armagh 1-8 to 0-8.

Down advanced to the Ulster final in 1986 where they met Tyrone. It was a close game but he ended up on the losing side as Down were beat 1-11 to 0-10.

O'Rourke won his first Dr McKenna Cup in 1987, beating Cavan 2-9 to 1-10.

Down advanced to the National Football League final in 1990 where they played Meath. It was a close game but Meath won 2-7 to 0-10. Down played Armagh in the Ulster quarter-final. Down won 1-7 to 0-8. Down would beat Derry after a replay 0-14 to 0-8 in the Ulster semi-final. Down played the reigning Ulster champions Donegal. Down won 1-15 to 0-10, giving O'Rourke his third Ulster winners medal. Down played Kerry. Down trailed 1-3 to 0-7 but Down won 2-9 to 0-8. O'Rourke led Down their first All-Ireland after a twenty-three year period. Down won 1-16 to 1-14.

O'Rourke won his second McKenna Cup in 1992, beating Cavan 1-13 to 0-7.

== Management career ==
O'Rourke took over Down seniors in 2003, leading them to their first Ulster final since 1999. The match with Tyrone was drawn but Tyrone won the replay. He was manager of the Down team from 2003-2006. He led the Down under-21s to an Ulster title in 2005, beating Cavan 2-14 to 2-12.

O'Rourke took Armagh to an NFL Division 2 title in his first year. On 26 July 2012, following a defeat by Roscommon in the All-Ireland qualifiers, Armagh GAA announced his replacement by Paul Grimley.

== Honours ==
County

- Ulster Senior Football Championship (3): 1978 1981 1991 C
- Ulster Under-21 Football Championship (3): 1977 1978 1979
- National Football League Division 2 (2): 1982 1988
- Dr McKenna Cup (2): 1987 1992
- All-Ireland Senior Football Championship (1): 1991 (c)
- National Football League Division 1 (1): 1983
- All-Ireland Under-21 Football Championship 1979
- Ulster Minor Football Championship (1): 1977
- All-Ireland Minor Football Championship (1): 1977

Club

- Down Senior Football Championship (8): 1981 1983 1984 1985 1986 1987 1988 1992
- Ulster Senior Club Football Championship (5): 1983 1984 1985 1987 1988
- All-Ireland Senior Club Football Championship (2): 1986 1988
- Down Minor Football Championship (2): 1974 1979
- Down Under-16 Football Championship (1): 1976

School

- Down Under-16 Vocational Schools Championship (2): 1974 1975
- Ulster Under-16 Vocational Schools Championship (2): 1974 1975
- All-Ireland Under-16 Vocational Schools Championship (2): 1975 1976

Manager

- Monaghan Senior Football Championship (2): 2001 2002
- Ulster Under-21 Football Championship (1): 2005
- National Football League Division 2 (1): 2010
- Down Senior Football Championship (1): 1997
- Down Senior Football League Division 1 (1): 1998

Province

- Railway Cup (2): 1983 198?

Sporting positions
Preceded by Tommy McGovern	Down Senior Football Captain; 1982	Succeeded by Mark Turley
Preceded by	Down Senior Football Captain; 1990-1992	Succeeded by
Preceded by Pete McGrath	Down Senior Football Manager; 2002-2006	Succeeded by Ross Carr
Preceded by Peter McDonnell	Armagh Senior Football Manager; 2009-2012	Succeeded by Paul Grimley
Achievements
Preceded by Larry Tompkins (Cork)	All-Ireland Senior Football winning captain 1991	Succeeded by Anthony Molloy (Donegal)
