= 1988 All-Ireland Senior Football Championship =

Football championship

Championship details
- Dates: 8 May – 9 October 1988
- Teams: 32

All-Ireland Champions
- Winning team: Meath (5th win)
- Captain: Joe Cassells
- Manager: Seán Boylan

All-Ireland Finalists
- Losing team: Cork
- Captain: Tony Nation
- Manager: Billy Morgan

Provincial Champions
- Munster: Cork
- Leinster: Meath
- Ulster: Monaghan
- Connacht: Mayo

Championship statistics
- No. matches played: 33
- Top Scorer: Brian Stafford (0–38)
- Player of the Year: Robbie O'Malley

The 1988 All-Ireland Senior Football Championship was the 102nd staging of the All-Ireland Senior Football Championship, the Gaelic Athletic Association's premier inter-county Gaelic football tournament. The championship began on 8 May 1988 and ended on 9 October 1988.

For the second year in a row, the final was between Meath and Cork. Again, the outcome was the same, Meath winning the replay by a scoreline of 0–13 to 0–12.

== Results ==
=== Connacht Senior Football Championship ===
Quarter-finals

5 June 1988 Quarter-final	London	2–10 – 2–13	Sligo	Emerald GAA Grounds, Ruislip
				Attendance: 2,000

19 June 1988 Quarter-final	Mayo	1–13 – 0–4	Leitrim	Fr. O'Hara Park, Charlestown
	P Brogan 1–2, T Morgan 0–3, M Carney 0–3, N Durcan 0–2, T Reilly 0–1, L McHale 0–1, B Molloy 0–1.		P Kenny 0–3, P Kernan 0–1.	Attendance: 4,000; Referee: M Kearins (Sligo)

Semi-finals

26 June 1988 Semi-final	Roscommon	2–10 – 1–10	Galway	Pearse Stadium, Galway
	T McManus 1–3, T Lennon 1–0, P Earley 0–3, J Kelly 0–2, J Connaughton 0–1, E McManus Jnr 0–1.		V Daly 0–5, M Gavin 1–0, J O'Dea 0–3, C O'Dea 0–1, J Coleman 0–1.	Attendance: 9,000; Referee: S Prior (Leitrim)

3 July 1988 Semi-final	Sligo	0–6 – 2–19	Mayo	Markievicz Park, Sligo
	D McDonagh 0–3, PJ Cavanagh 0–1, D McGoldrick 0–1, P Dockery 0–1.		M Butler 1–6, M Carney 1–1, T Reilly 0–4, T Morgan 0–3, L McHale 0–2, N Durkan 0–1, S Maher 0–1, TJ Kilgallon 0–1.	Attendance: 5,000; Referee: S Mullaney (Roscommon)

Final

24 July 1988 Final	Roscommon	0–8 – 1–12	Mayo	Dr. Hyde Park, Roscommon
	P Earley 0–5, S Killoran 0–1, E McManus 0–1, T McManus 0–1.		T Reilly 1–1, M Carney 0–4, D Flanagan 0-2f, TJ Kilgallon 0–1, M Butler 0–1, L McHale 0–1, N Durkin 0–1, J BUrke 0–1.	Attendance: 20,000; Referee: M Kearins (Sligo)

=== Leinster Senior Football Championship ===
Preliminary round

22 May 1988 Preliminary round	Longford	1–11 – 0–7	Westmeath	Pearse Park, Longford
	J McCormack 0–7, D Barry 1–2, M O'Hara 0–1, O Kiernan 0–1.		R Fleming 0–3, P Walsh 0–2, T Ormsby 0–1, L Giles 0–1.	Attendance: 4,000; Referee: C Buckley (Offaly)

22 May 1988 Preliminary round	Offaly	1–18 – 1–7	Wexford	O'Connor Park, Tullamore
	B Flynn 1–2, S Lynam 0–4, D Kavanagh 0–3, V Claffey 0–2, P Brady 0–2, R O'Connor 0–2, P Mollan 0–1, P Cushen 0–1, J Stewart 0–1.		P Barden 1–0, M Hannck 0–3, J O'Gorman 0–2, J Harrington 0–1, M Mahon 0–1.	Referee: P Moran (Laois)

22 May 1988 Preliminary round	Carlow	3–5 – 2–7	Laois	Dr. Cullen Park, Carlow
	J Hayden 1–0, L Kelly 1–0, P Quirke 1–0, P Kenny 0–2, M Nolan 0–1, J Nevin 0–1, G Byrne 0–1.		T Maher 1–0, S Dempsey 1–0, G Lalor 0–3, G Browne 0–2, D Lalor 0–1, p Brophy 0–1.	Attendance: 5,500; Referee: S Aldridge (Kildare)

Quarter-finals

5 June 1988 Quarter-final	Kildare	1–10 – 0–13	Offaly	St. Conleth's Park, Newbridge
	D Fannin 1–1, M Shaw 0–3, S McGovern 0–1, B Donovan 0–1, D Kerrigan 0–1, S Ryan 0–1, P McLoughlin 0–1, Moran 0–1.		D Kavanagh 0–5, S Lynam, 0–5, B Flynn 0–2, R Connor 0–1.	Attendance: 6,000; Referee: P Kavanagh (Meath)

5 June 1988 Quarter-final	Longford	1–15 – 2–4	Wicklow	Pearse Park, Longford
	J McCormack 1–8, D Barry 0–3, B Lennon 0–2, C Gilmore 0–1, G Clarke 0–1.		F Daly 1–0, P O'Byrne 1–0, R McHugh 0–2, P Spollen 0–2.	Referee: C Conlon (Westmeath)

5 June 1988 Quarter-final	Louth	0–9 – 3–13	Meath	Drogheda Park, Drogheda
	K Dawe 0–3, Jim McDonnell 0–2, B Kerin 0–1, R Culhane 0–1, P Matthews 0–1, S O'Hanlon 0–1.		B Stafford 0–6, D Beggy 1–2, B Flynn 0–4, PJ Gillic 1–0, M McCabe 1–0, T Ferguson 0–1.	Attendance: 21,000; Referee: J Woods (Dublin)

6 June 1988 Quarter-final	Carlow	0–8 – 1–14	Dublin	Dr. Cullen Park, Carlow
	T Dwyer 0–3, J Hayden 0–2, P Quirke 0–1, W Doyle 0–1.		M Galvin 1–2, C Redmond 0–5, D de Lapp 0–2, B Rock 0–2, C Crowley 0–1, V Murphy 0–1, J Bissett 0–1.	Attendance: 8,000; Referee: T Howard (Kildare)

18 June 1988 Quarter-final replay	Offaly	0–16 – 0–10	Kildare	O'Connor Park, Tullamore
	S Lynam 0–5, P Brady 0–4, V Claffey 0–2, D Kavangh 0–1, J Stewart 0–1, M Plunkett 0–1, B Flynn 0–1, R Connor 0–1.		P McLoughlin 0–4, L McLoughlin 0–2, G Power 0–2, M Shaw 0–1, B Donovan 0–1.	Attendance: 3,500; Referee: P Kavanagh (Meath)

Semi-finals

26 June 1988 Semi-final	Dublin	4–15 – 0–9	Longford	Cusack Park, Mullingar
	B Rock 1–3, V Murphy 1–2, M Galvin 1–1, D Sheehan 0–4, J McNally 1–0, C Redmond 0–3, J Bissett 0–1, T Conroy 0–1.		J McCormack 0–6, B Lennon 0–1, C Lee 0–1, P Kiernan 0–1.	Referee: C Conlon (Westmeath)

3 July 1988 Semi-final	Meath	0–19 – 0–10	Offaly	Croke Park, Dublin
	B Stafford 0–8, B Flynn 0–6, C O'Rourke 0–2, D Beggy 0–1, PJ Gillic 0–1, M McCabe 0–1.		P Brady 0–3, S Lynam 0–3, D Kavanagh 0–2, M Plunkett 0–1, T Egan 0–1.	Attendance: 13,030; Referee: T Howard (Kildare)

Final

31 July 1988 Final	Meath	2–5 – 0–9	Dublin	Croke Park, Dublin
	PJ Gillic 1–3 (0-2f), Mattie McCabe 1–1, Liam Hayes 0–1		Declan Sheehan 0–3 (0-1f), Vinnie Murphy 0–2, Noel McCaffrey, Charlie Redmond (0–1 pen), Barney Rock (0-1f), Mick Galvin 0–1 each	Attendance: 42,302; Referee: Seamus Aldridge (Kildare)

=== Munster Senior Football Championship ===
Quarter-finals

8 May 1988 Quarter-final	Limerick	2–4 – 0–5	Clare	Gaelic Grounds, Limerick
	E Sheehan 1–2, F Ryan 1–0, L Long 0–1, L Keane 0–1.		N Normoyle 0–2, C O'Donoghue 0–1, G O'Keeffe 0–1, P Burke 0–1.	Referee: P Barrett (Tipperary)

8 May 1988 Quarter-final	Waterford	3–9 – 1–11	Tipperary	Fraher Field, Dungarvan
	N Waldon 1–1, D Wyse 1–0, J Maher 1–0, P Whyte 0–3, E O'Brien 0–3, J McGrath 0–1.		M Cunningham 0–4, D O'Keeffe 1–0, A Crosse 0–2, J Costello 0–2, J Ryan 0–2, D Foley 0–1.	Referee: P O'Donovan (Cork)

Semi-finals

29 May 1988 Semi-final	Limerick	1–3 – 0–9	Cork	Páirc na nGael, Askeaton
	C McGuinness 1–0, L Barrett 0–1, N Leonard 0–1, T Cummins 0–1.		L Tompkins 0–6, M McCarthy 0–1, T Nation 0–1, D Barry 0–1.	Referee: T Sugrue (Kerry)

29 May 1988 Semi-final	Kerry	3–19 – 1–7	Waterford	Austin Stack Park, Tralee
	P Spillane 1–6, M Fitzgerald 0–6, W Maher 1–1, D McEvoy 1–1, M McAuliffe 0–4, G Power 0–1.		J Maher 1–2, D Wyse 0–1, L Daniels 0–1, E Phelan 0–1, L O'Connor 0–1, E O'Brien 0–1.	Referee: P Lane (Limerick)

Final

3 July 1988 Final	Cork	1–14 – 0–16	Kerry	Páirc Uí Chaoimh, Cork
	L Tompkins 0–5, D Allen 1–1, D Barry 0–2, M McCarthy 0–2, C O'Neill 0–1, J O'Driscoll 0–1, S Fahy 0–1, P McGrath 0–1.		M Fitzgerald 0–10, P Spillane 0–1, W Maher 0–1, C Murphy 0–1, M McAuliffe 0–1, T Doyle 0–1, J O'Shea 0–1.	Attendance: 41,234; Referee: P Lane (Limerick)

=== Ulster Senior Football Championship ===
Preliminary round

15 May 1988 Preliminary round	Fermanagh	1–13 – 2–12	Armagh	St. Molaise Park, Irvinestown
	P McGinnity 0–5, T Maguire 1–1, P Courtney 0–3, P O'Loughlin 0–2, M O'Rourke 0–1, F McCann 0–1.		J Cunningham 2–5, G Houlihan 0–2, F Harney 0–2, J McConville 0–1, M Toye 0–1, D Canavan 0–1.	Referee: J Curran (Tyrone)

Quarter-finals

22 May 1988 Quarter-final	Monaghan	0–16 – 0–14	Cavan	St. Tiernach's Park, Clones
	E Hughes 0–5, E McEneaney 0–3, E Murphy 0–2, O Hamilton 0–2, C Murray 0–1, D Byrne 0–1, R McCarron 0–1, B Murray 0–1.		R Carolan 0–10, M Faulkner 0–1, F Cahill 0–1, D McDonnell 0–1, J Brady 0–1.	Attendance: 15,000; Referee: D Campbell (Fermanagh)

29 May 1988 Quarter-final	Derry	0–7 – 1–11	Down	Dean McGlinchey Park, Ballinascreen
	B Barton 0–2, B McGilligan 0–1, P Young 0–1, E Gormley 0–1, D Cassidy 0–1, S Downey 0–1.		M Linden 1–0, B Mason 0–3, J Treanor 0–3, G Blaney 0–3, K O';Rourke 0–2.	Referee: J Gough (Antrim)

5 June 1988 Quarter-final	Tyrone	3–13 – 2–4	Antrim	Healy Park, Omagh
				Attendance: 10,000; Referee: A O'Neill (Derry)

12 June 1988 Quarter-final	Armagh	2–10 – 0–8	Donegal	Athletic Grounds, Armagh
	G Houlihan 1–3, K McGuirk 1–0, M Toye 0–2, J Cunningham 0–2, D Dowling 0–1, C Harney 0–1, D Canavan 0–1.		M McHugh 0–4, J McMullan 0–3, P Heggarty 0–1.	Attendance: 6,000; Referee: B Murray (Monaghan)

Semi-finals

19 June 1988 Semi-final	Monaghan	1–11 – 0–9	Down	Breffni Park, Cavan
	E McEneaney 1–5, E Murphy 0–2, G McCarville 0–2, R McCarron 0–1, D Byrne 0–1.		J Treanor 0–5, A Rodgers 0–2, G Blaney 0–1, B Mason 0–1.	Attendance: 17,000; Referee: M Greenan (Cavan)

26 June 1988 Semi-final	Tyrone	0–15 – 1–8	Armagh	St. Molaise Park, Irvinestown
	S Conway 0–5, K McCabe 0–4, E McKenna 0–3, P Donaghy 0–1, S McNally 0–1, D O'Hagan 0–1.		K McQuirk 1–0, G Houlihan 0–4, J Cunningham 0–2, F Harney 0–1, D Canavan 0–1.	Attendance: 12,000; Referee: M Cranney (Down)

Final

17 July 1988 Final	Monaghan	1–10 – 0–11	Tyrone	St. Tiernach's Park, Clones
	E Hughes 1–3, R McKaron 0–2, D Byrne 0–1, G McCarville 0–1, S White 0–1, O Hamilton 0–1, Bernie Murray 0–1.		S Conway 0–5, D O'Hagan 0–2, K McCabe 0–2, E McKenna 0–1, P Quinn 0–1.	Attendance: 25,000; Referee: M Cranney (Down)

=== All-Ireland Senior Football Championship ===
Semi-finals

14 August 1988 Semi-final	Cork	1–14 – 0–6	Monaghan	Croke Park, Dublin
	L Tompkins 0–7, D Barry 1–2, P McGrath 0–4, T McCarthy 0–1.		E McEneaney 0–3, R McCarron 0–2, E Murphy 0–1.	Attendance: 29,679; Referee: S Prior (Leitrim)

21 August 1988 Semi-final	Meath	0–16 – 2–5	Mayo	Croke Park, Dublin
	B Stafford 0–9, C Coyle 0–3, C O'Rourke 0–2, D Beggy 0–1, M McCabe 0–1.		A Finnerty 1–1, L McHale 1–0, M Carney 0–2, D Kearney 0–1, N Durkin 0–1.	Attendance: 39,023; Referee: T Sugrue (Kerry)

Finals

18 September 1988 Final	Meath	0–12 – 1–9	Cork	Croke Park, Dublin
	B Stafford 0–8, C O'Rourke 0–4.		L Tompkins 0–8, T McCarthy 1–0, M McCarthy 0–1.	Attendance: 65,898; Referee: T Sugrue (Kerry)

9 October 1988 Final replay	Meath	0–13 – 0–12	Cork	Croke Park, Dublin
	B Stafford 0–7, C O'Rourke 0–3, B Flynn 0–1, D Beggy 0–1, J Cassells 0–1.		L Tompkins 0–8, B Coffey 0–2, D Allen 0–1, D Barry 0–1.	Attendance: 64,069; Referee: T Sugrue (Kerry)

== Championship statistics ==
=== Top scorers ===
Overall

Rank	Player	County	Tally	Total	Matches	Average
1	Brian Stafford	Meath	0–38	38	5	7.60
2	Larry Tompkins	Cork	0–34	34	5	6.80

Single game

Rank	Player	County	Tally	Total	Opposition
1	Joey Cunningham	Armagh	2–5	11	Fermanagh
1	John McCormack	Longford	1–8	11	Wicklow
3	Maurice Fitzgerald	Kerry	0–10	10	Cork
3	Ronan Carolan	Cavan	0–10	10	Monaghan
5	Mark Butler	Mayo	1–6	9	Sligo
5	Pat Spillane	Kerry	1–6	9	Waterford
5	Brian Stafford	Meath	0–9	9	Mayo
8	Eamonn McEneaney	Monaghan	1–5	8	Down
8	Larry Tompkins	Cork	0–8	8	Meath
8	Brian Stafford	Meath	0–8	8	Cork
8	Larry Tompkins	Cork	0–8	8	Meath
8	Brian Stafford	Meath	0–8	8	Offaly

=== Miscellaneous ===
- Carlow's 3–5 to 2–7 defeat of Laois in the Leinster preliminary round is their first defeat of their neighbours since 1961.
- Monaghan's 0–16 to 0–14 defeat of Cavan in the Ulster quarter-final is their first defeat of their neighbours since 1930.
- The All Ireland semi-final between Cork and Monaghan was the first meeting between the teams.
- The All-Ireland final ends in a draw and goes to a replay for the first time since 1972.
- Meath were All Ireland Champions for 2 in a row and Leinster Champions for 3 in a row and they shared their 2 in a row with Galway in the Hurling.

== Roll of Honour ==
- Kerry – 30 (1986)
- Dublin – 21 (1983)
- Galway – 7 (1966)
- Wexford – 5 (1918)
- Meath – 5 (1988)
- Cavan – 5 (1952)
- Cork – 4 (1973)
- Kildare – 4 (1928)
- Tipperary – 4 (1920)
- Offaly – 3 (1982)
- Down – 3 (1968)
- Louth – 3 (1957)
- Mayo – 3 (1951)
- Roscommon – 2 (1944)
- Limerick – 2 (1896)
