= Seán Boylan =

Irish hurler and Gaelic footballer

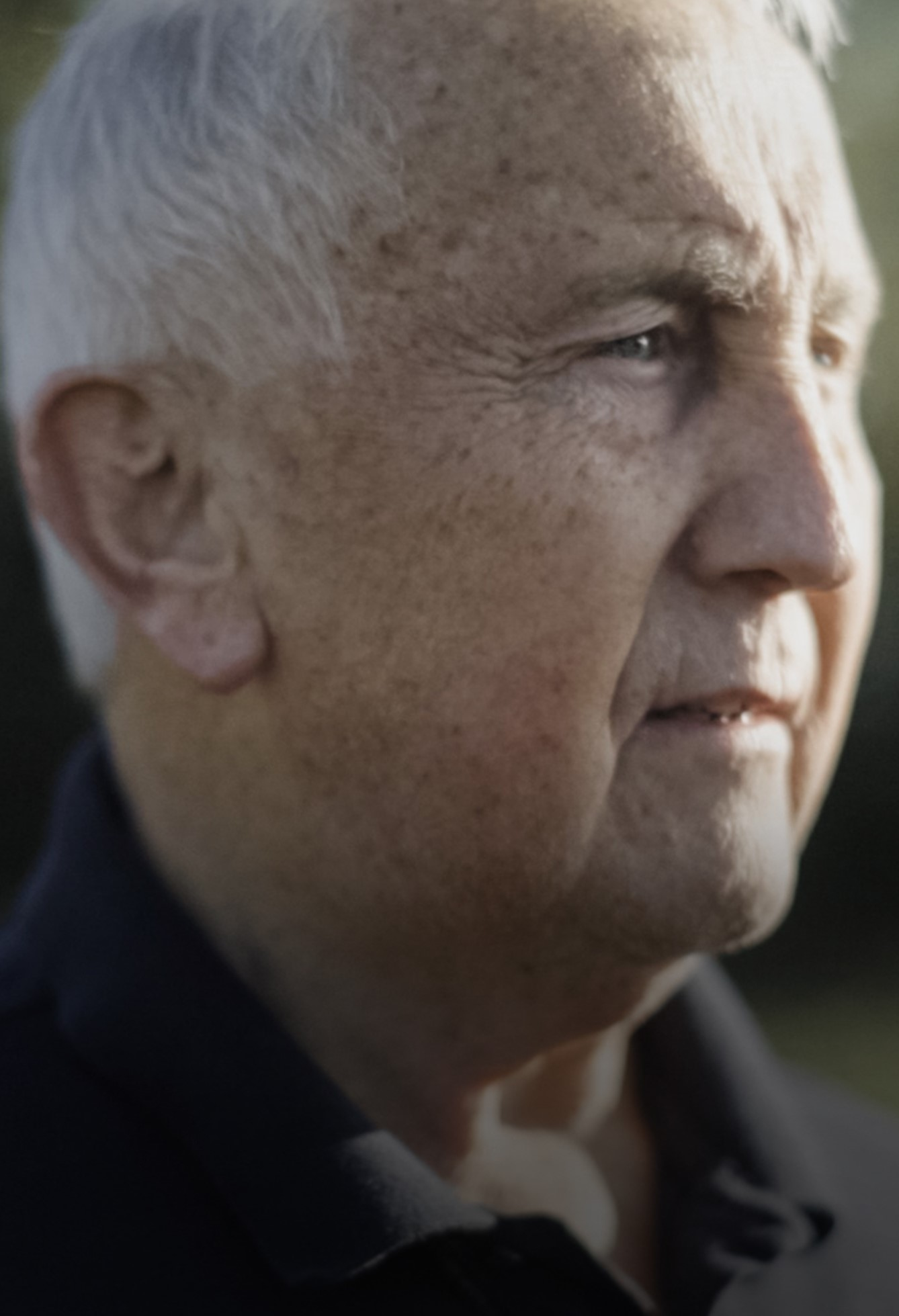

Personal information
- Native name: Seán Ó Baíolláin (Irish)
- Born: 12 December 1949 (age 76) Dunboyne, County Meath, Ireland

Sport
- Sport: Gaelic football
Club management
- Years: Club
- St Peters Dunboyne
Inter-county management
- Years: Team
- 1982–2005: Meath
Inter-county titles as manager
County	League	Province	All-Ireland
Meath	3	8	4

Seán Boylan (born 12 December 1949) is an Irish former Gaelic football manager from Dunboyne, County Meath. He retired from his position as manager of the senior Meath county team on the evening of 31 August 2005 after twenty-three years in charge. This was an inter-county managerial record with one team that was only surpassed in Gaelic games by Brian Cody in 2022, his 24th and last season as manager of the Kilkenny senior hurling team.

During his time with Meath, he managed the team to: the Centenary Cup; eight Leinster Senior Football Championship titles; four All-Ireland Senior Football Championship titles (1987, 1988, 1996, 1999); three National Football League titles.

He also managed the Meath county hurling team, whom he also played with for 21 years. He managed Ireland in the 2006 and 2008 International Rules Series.

On 6 August 2020, a documentary called Seán, directed by Alan Bradley, aired on RTÉ about Boylan's life on and off the pitch.

== Gaelic games ==
In recognition of his services to Meath GAA and his services to Meath as a county, Boylan was conferred as Freeman of the County of Meath – the first (and only) person ever to be bestowed with the title – on 23 April 2006. He was entered into the GAA Hall of Fame for his services to Meath football at a ceremony after Meath's Leinster Minor Football Championship victory over Offaly in Croke Park on 16 July 2006.

In August 2006, he was once again nominated for the role of Meath senior hurling team manager, the position he originally expected to have been nominated for when he ended up as Meath's inter-county football manager.

He has also been involved with UCD in the Sigerson Cup and was announced as part of Conor Laverty's Down under-20 backroom team in December 2020.

In 2011, he was ratified as Meath's Director of Football, representing the Meath Co Committee in the sport's development at all levels and having a role in appointing all managers of county teams.

After Colm O'Rourke was appointed as Meath senior manager in 2022, he wrote that Boylan "will have open access to the team as adviser, counsellor, motivator or whatever else he wants to be". O'Rourke ceased to be manager of Meath in August 2024.

== Managerial statistics ==
Below is Boylan's All-Ireland Senior Football Championship record as Meath manager.

Year	Played	Won	Draw	Lost	Honours
1983	2	0	1	1	
1984	4	3	0	1	
1985	2	1	0	1	
1986	4	3	0	1	Leinster Champions
1987	5	5	0	0	Leinster and All-Ireland Champions
1988	6	5	1	0	Leinster and All-Ireland Champions
1989	3	2	0	1	
1990	5	4	0	1	Leinster Champions and All-Ireland Runner up
1991	10	5	4	1	Leinster Champions and All-Ireland Runner up
1992	1	0	0	1	
1993	2	1	0	1	
1994	3	2	0	1	
1995	4	3	0	1	
1996	6	5	1	0	Leinster and All-Ireland Champions
1997	5	2	2	1	
1998	3	2	0	1	
1999	5	5	0	0	Leinster and All-Ireland Champions
2000	1	0	0	1	
2001	7	5	1	1	Leinster Champions and All-Ireland Runner up
2002	5	3	0	2	
2003	5	2	1	2	
2004	3	1	0	2	
2005	4	2	0	2	
Total	95	61	11	23	
Percentages		64%	12%	24%	

== Honours ==
=== Manager ===
Meath

- All-Ireland Senior Football Championship (4): 1987, 1988, 1996, 1999
- Leinster Senior Football Championship (8): 1986, 1987, 1988, 1990, 1991, 1996, 1999, 2001
- National Football League (3): 1988, 1990, 1994

Meath management roll of honour

- 1983 – O'Byrne Cup
- 1984 – Centenary Cup
- 1986 – Leinster SFC
- 1987 – Leinster SFC, All-Ireland SFC
- 1988 – Leinster SFC, All-Ireland SFC, NFL
- 1990 – Leinster SFC, NFL
- 1991 – Leinster SFC
- 1992 – O'Byrne Cup
- 1994 – NFL
- 1996 – Leinster SFC, All-Ireland SFC
- 1999 – Leinster SFC, All-Ireland SFC
- 2001 – Leinster SFC, O'Byrne Cup
- 2004 – O'Byrne Cup

== International rules football ==
Boylan coached the Ireland team against Australia in the 2006 International Rules Series in two games in Pearse Stadium, Salthill, Galway and Croke Park, Dublin in October 2006. Australia won the series by 30 points but the game was overshadowed by violent incidents in the first quarter of the second test match, including a serious injury sustained by Graham Geraghty. He also admitted that he brought his players off at the end of the first quarter in protest and did not want them to return, later saying: "I said I'd do it. Only the players themselves changed my mind. They said they wanted to go out and give it a go, they wanted to play football."

Boylan coached the international side again in the 2008 International Rules Series. Ireland won on an aggregate score of 102–97.

== Outside Gaelic games ==
Boylan's late father, also called Seán, was a leader of the Irish independence movement in the early twentieth century, being a prominent member of the IRA in County Meath during the Irish War of Independence.

Like another Meath football icon, Colm O'Rourke, Boylan has strong County Leitrim connections as his late mother hailed from near the small village of Cloone near Mohill.

Boylan is a traditional medical herbalist, practising out of his home at Edenmore, Dunboyne.

He had prostate cancer in 2009. In January 2021, he gave an interview to RTÉ Radio, during which he said he had tested positive for COVID-19 the previous March, lost ten kilograms in six days, and was in Connolly Hospital in Blanchardstown until the 31st of the same month. Less than three months later, Boylan said he was "shocked" after photographs circulated of Dublin secretly training during Level 5 restrictions, breaching both GAA rules and Government regulations.

== See also ==
- List of Irish sportspeople

Gaelic games
Preceded by Mick O'Brien	Meath Senior Football Manager; 1982–2005	Succeeded by Eamonn Barry
