= Ross Carr =

Irish Gaelic footballer

Personal information
- Born: Hilltown, County Down, Northern Ireland
- Height: 5 ft 11 in (180 cm)

Sport
- Sport: Gaelic football
- Position: Right half-forward
Club
- Years: Club
- Clonduff
Club titles
- Down titles: 1
Inter-county
- Years: County
- 1986–2000: Down
Inter-county titles
- Ulster titles: 4
- All-Irelands: 2
- NFL: 2 (Div 2, Div 3)
- All Stars: 1

Ross Carr (b. 1964) is a former Gaelic football manager and player, in both cases at senior inter-county level with Down. Carr also managed the Down minor team in 2003 and 2004. He made his senior debut in the 1983-84 National League away to Galway. Carr won two All-Ireland medals with the Mourne county, in 1991 and 1994. He finished as top scorer in the Ulster Championship of 1991 with 21 points, finishing the All-Ireland series with 30 points and earning an All-Star award at right half-forward that year. He played his club football for Clonduff GAC.

Carr previously managed Co Monaghan side Castleblayney Faughs. He was assisted by DJ Kane, Declan Mussen and Michael Doyle during his management period at Down.

The Carr family has its roots in Warrenpoint. He is married to Theresa and has five children (Fionnuala, Aidan, Sarah-Louise, Charlie and Ross) and six grandchildren. His former teacher, Kevin Mussen, recalls Carr as being very hard to handle at school albeit he became a very good footballer.

In 2021, Carr wrote and open letter to the Irish government, urging it to "take the lead" in creating a road map for a united Ireland.

== Honours ==
- All-Ireland Senior Football Championship: 1991, 1994
- Ulster Senior Football Championship: 1991, 1994
- Dr McKenna Cup: 1987, 1989, 1992, 1996, 1998
- National Football League Division 2: 1988
- National Football League Division 3: 1997
- Ulster Minor Football Championship: 1983
- Ulster Under-21 Football Championship: 1984
- All Star Awards: 1991
- Irish News Ulster All-Stars: 1998
- Down Senior Football Championship: 2000

Preceded by Paddy O'Rourke	Down Senior Football Manager; 2006-2009	Succeeded by James McCartan Jnr
