= Brian Stafford (Gaelic footballer) =

Irish Gaelic footballer

Personal information
- Born: 4 June 1964 (age 62) Cavan Town, County Cavan, Ireland
- Occupation: Sales rep
- Height: 6 ft 0 in (183 cm)

Sport
- Sport: Gaelic football
- Position: Full-forward
Club
- Years: Club
- Kilmainhamwood
Inter-county
Years	County	Apps (scores)
1986–1995	Meath	41 (9–206)
Inter-county titles
- Leinster titles: 5
- All-Irelands: 2
- NFL: 3
- All Stars: 3

Brian Stafford is an Irish former Gaelic footballer. He played for the Meath county team in the 1980s and early 1990s under the management of Sean Boylan. For Meath he usually played at full forward. He played club football for Kilmainhamwood. During his playing career he won two Senior All Ireland medals (1987 & 1988) as well as five Leinster Senior Medals and three National League Medals. He won three All Star awards also. In 1987 he was chosen as the Texaco Footballer of the Year. When playing for Meath he was part of a full forward line of Colm O'Rourke, himself and Bernard Flynn.

Stafford is his county's top scorer in National Football League history, finishing his career with 13–334 (373) in that competition.

Preceded by Pat Spillane (Kerry)	Texaco Footballer of the Year; 1987	Succeeded by Robbie O'Malley (Meath)
