= 2025 Laois Senior Hurling Championship =

Annual hurling competition season

- Dates: 11 July - 19 October 2025
- Teams: 10
- Sponsor: Laois Shopping Centre
- Champions: Clough–Ballacolla (8th title); Aidan Corby (captain); Willie Hyland (manager)
- Runners-up: Camross; Dwane Palmer (captain); David Cuddy (manager)

Tournament statistics
- Matches played: 31
- Goals scored: 87 (2.81 per match)
- Points scored: 1185 (38.23 per match)
- Top scorer(s): Zane Keenan (7-68)

The 2025 Laois Senior Hurling Championship was the 132nd staging of the Laois Senior Hurling Championship since its establishment by the Laois County Board in 1888. The draw for the group stage placings took place on 27 February 2025. The championship ran from 11 July to 19 October 2025.

Clough–Ballacolla entered the championship as the defending champions.

The final was played on 19 October 2025 at Laois Hire O'Moore Park in Port Laoise, between Clough–Ballacolla and Camross, in what was their fourth meeting in the final overall and a first meeting in three years. Clough–Ballacolla won the match by 2–21 to 2–15 to claim their eighth championship title overall and a second consecutive title.

Zane Keenan was the championship's Top scorer with 7-68.

== Format change ==
A change to the format of the competition was adopted by clubs at a County Committee meeting in November 2023. One of the main changes was an increase in the number of participating clubs from eight to ten. The new format saw the teams drawn into two groups of five but playing against the teams in the other group.

== Team changes ==
=== To Championship ===
Promoted from the Laois Premier Intermediate Hurling Championship

- Ballinakill
- Borris–Kilcotton

== Group stage ==
=== Group A table ===
Semi-finals Quarter-finals Relegation playoff

Team	Matches				Score			Pts
Team	Pld	W	D	L	For	Against	Diff	Pts
Clough–Ballacolla	5	3	0	2	107	102	5	6
Rosenallis	5	3	0	2	110	107	3	6
Ballinakill	5	2	0	3	111	126	-15	4
Abbeyleix	5	1	1	3	111	118	-7	3
Portlaoise	5	1	1	3	115	131	-16	3

=== Group B table ===
Semi-finals Quarter-finals Relegation playoff

Team	Matches				Score			Pts
Team	Pld	W	D	L	For	Against	Diff	Pts
Rathdowney–Errill	5	4	0	1	134	104	30	8
Camross	5	3	1	1	128	107	21	7
Borris–Kilcotton	5	3	0	2	112	112	0	6
The Harps	5	2	0	3	112	111	1	4
Castletown	5	1	1	3	98	120	-22	3

=== Group stage results ===
11 July 2025 Round 1	Abbeyleix	2-17 - 2-20	The Harps	Laois Hire O'Moore Park
	C Byrne 1-8, F Mahony 1-1, E Rowland 0-3, Ciaran Byrne 0-2, Colin Byrne 0-1, S Quinn 0-1, E Fennelly 0-1.	Report	C Comerford 0-11, J O'Connor 1-1, M Lanigan 1-0, P Delaney 0-2, H Whelan 0-1, C Flynn 0-1, M Monahan 0-1, R Deegan 0-1, E Doheny 0-1, R Edwards 0-1.

12 July 2025 Round 1	Rosenallis	2-12 - 5-18	Rathdowney–Errill	Laois Hire O'Moore Park
	P Keating 1-2, D Dooley 0-5, J Keating 1-0, J Hyland 0-2, B McCormack 0-1, J Friel 0-1, J Lennon 0-1.	Report	M Kavanagh 0-9, E Bracken 2-1, B McGinley 1-2, P Purcell 1-2, J Kelly 1-2, E Bourke 0-2.

12 July 2025 Round 1	Ballinakill	0-22 - 1-20	Borris–Kilcotton	Laois Hire O'Moore Park
	B Duggan 0-7, C Dwyer 0-6, B O'Mara 0-3, E Dwyer 0-2, S Fitzpatrick 0-2, D Bergin 0-1, G Lynch 0-1.	Report	A Dunphy 0-6, N Coss 0-4, PJ Scully 0-4, E Fleming 1-0, J Quinlan 0-2, M Whelan 0-2, E Coss 0-2.

13 July 2025 Round 1	Clough–Ballacolla	1-24 - 1-14	Castletown	Laois Hire O'Moore Park
	S Bergin 1-9, A Corby 0-5, C Dunne 0-3, M Hennessy 0-2, J Corby 0-2, C Hogan 0-1, K Mulhall 0-1, W Dunphy 0-1.	Report	S Óg Byrne 1-3, C McKelvey 0-4, M Phelan 0-3, R Mullaney 0-2, C Doran 0-1, J Conroy 0-1.

13 July 2025 Round 1	Portlaoise	2-22 - 5-13	Camross	Laois Hire O'Moore Park
	S Culliton 0-11 (five frees, two 65s), JM Foley 2-1, C Raggett and C Duggan 0-3 each, B Brennan 0-2, C Rigney (free) and J Keenan 0-1 each	Report	Z Keenan 1-5 (1-0 pen, 0-2 frees, one 65), J Cuddy 1-3, L Delaney and C Collier 1-2 each, A Keenan 1-0, D Delaney 0-1 (free)

17 July 2025 Round 2	Ballinakill	1-16 - 1-20	Rathdowney–Errill	Laois Hire O'Moore Park
	B Duggan 0-9, B O'Mara 1-1, G Lynch 0-2, C Dwyer 0-2, E Dwyer 0-1, D Byrne-Gray 0-1.	Report	M Kavanagh 1-8, J Kelly 0-5, J Ryan 0-2, P Rafter 0-1, P Purcell 0-1, P McCane 0-1, E Bracken 0-1, E Bourke 0-1.

18 July 2025 Round 2	Portlaoise	2-19 - 1-19	The Harps	Laois Hire O'Moore Park
	S Culleton 0-5, E Critchley 1-1, B O'Reilly 1-0, B Brennan 0-3, C Rigney 0-2, M Dempsey 0-2, JM Foley 0-2, E O'Connor 0-2, C McEvoy 0-1, C Raggett 0-1.	Report	Ciaran Comerford 0-8, Cody Comerford 1-0, H Whelan 0-3, P Delaney 0-2, R Deegan 0-1, J Duggan 0-1, C Murphy 0-1, E Doheny 0-1, M Monahan 0-1, C Brophy 0-1.

19 July 2025 Round 2	Abbeyleix	0-17 - 1-14	Castletown	Laois Hire O'Moore Park
	Cormac Byrne 0-12, Colin Byrne 0-2, E Fennelly 0-1, Ciarán Byrne 0-1, S Quinn 0-1.	Report	C Peters 1-2, J Breen 0-3, C McKelvey 0-3, M Phelan 0-2, C Doran 0-1, J Conroy 0-1, S Óg Byrne 0-1, K Cuddy 0-1.

19 July 2025 Round 2	Rosenallis	2-19 - 1-17	Camross	Laois Hire O'Moore Park
	D Dooley 0-6, B Fitzpatrick 1-2, J Lennon 0-4, S Kelly 1-0, P Keating 0-3, C Cosgrove 0-2, J Hyland 0-1, J Friel 0-1.	Report	Z Keenan 1-12, C Collier 0-2, B Deegan 0-1, O Phelan 0-1, A Keenan 0-1.

21 July 2025 Round 2	Clough–Ballacolla	0-21 - 0-16	Borris–Kilcotton	Laois Hire O'Moore Park
	S Bergin 0-5 (fs), C Dunne 0-4, A Corby 0-3, B Corby 0-2, K Hyland 0-2, M Hennessy 0-2, J Corby, L Conway and J Pearson 0-1 each.	Report	A Dunphy 0-12 (0-10fs), N Foyle 0-4.

1 August 2025 Round 3	Abbeyleix	2-23 - 2-19	Rathdowney–Errill	Laois Hire O'Moore Park
	C Byrne 0-9 (four frees, one '65), L Kavanagh 1-4, C Byrne 1-2, E Quinn, E Rowland (frees), and C Byrne 0-2 each, C Walsh and K Byrne 0-1 each.	Report	M Kavanagh 0-11 (nine frees), B McGinley and T Dowling 1-0 each, P Purcell 0-2, R Bowe, P Rafter, J Ryan, J Kelly, E Bourke and E Bracken 0-1 each.

2 August 2025 Round 3	Rosenallis	2-23 - 0-16	Castletown	Laois Hire O'Moore Park
	D Dooley 0-10 (five frees, one ’65), C Cosgrove 0-4, P Keating 1-1, S Kelly 1-0 (penalty), J Hyland 0-2, J Friel, B Fitzpatrick, J Lennon, FC Fennell, S Somers and C Friel 0-1 each.	Report	M Phelan 0-4, K Cuddy 0-3 (all frees), T Cuddy, S Phelan and R Mullaney 0-2 each, J Phelan, C Doran and S Og Byrne 0-1 each

2 August 2025 Round 3	Ballinakill	2-19 - 0-23	The Harps	Laois Hire O'Moore Park
	C Dwyer 1-7 (1-2 frees), B O’Mara 1-4, B Duggan 0-5 (three frees), S Fitzpatrick 0-2, P Simms 0-1 (free).	Report	C Comerford 0-13 (eight frees), P Delaney 0-4 (two frees), Justin Duggan and James Duggan 0-2 each, R Deegan and H Whelan 0-1 each.

3 August 2025 Round 3	Portlaoise	3-11 - 1-24	Borris–Kilcotton	Laois Hire O'Moore Park
	C Duggan 1-5, B O'Reilly 1-1, E Critchley 1-0, JM Foley 0-1, J Keenan 0-1, B Brennan 0-1, S Culleton 0-1, D Lynch 0-1.	Report	A Dunphy 0-9, S Dunphy 1-2, J Quinlan 0-5, N Foyle 0-3, E Quinlan 0-2, N Coss 0-2, C Kilbane 0-1.

3 August 2025 Round 3	Clough–Ballacolla	0-18 - 2-19	Camross	Laois Hire O'Moore Park
	S Bergin 0-10 (0-5 frees), C Dunne 0-4, M Hennessy 0-2, P Brennan and W Dunphy 0-1 each	Report	T Keyes 1-6, Z Keenan 0-8 (0-6 frees, 0-2 65’s), M Dowling 1-1, J Cuddy and T Cuddy 0-2 each.

15 August 2025 Round 4	Portlaoise	2-16 - 2-18	Castletown	Laois Hire O'Moore Park
	A Bergin 1-10 (0-7 frees, 0-1 65), J Conroy 1-0, S Culleton 0-2, J Keenan, D O'Mahoney, C Duggan and E Critchley 0-1 each.	Report	C Doran 1-3, K Cuddy 0-6 (two frees), B Reddin 0-4, M Phelan 1-0, R Peters 0-2, S Og Byrne (free), J Breen and J Phelan 0-1 each.

16 August 2025 Round 4	Abbeyleix	1-23 - 2-22	Borris–Kilcotton	Laois Hire O'Moore Park
	Cormac Byrne 0-6 (four frees), Colin Byrne 0-5, Ciaran Byrne 0-3, K Byrne 0-2, S Quinn 1-0, E Rowland 0-2 (frees), C Walsh 0-2, E Fennelly 0-2, A Carroll 0-1.	Report	A Dunphy 1-16 (1-11 frees), N Foyle 1-0, J Quinlan 0-1, N Coss 0-1, S Dunphy 0-1, E Fitzpatrick 0-1, C Kilbane 0-1, M Whelan 0-1.

16 August 2025 Round 4	Clough–Ballacolla	1-15 - 1-20	Rathdowney–Errill	Laois Hire O'Moore Park
	S Bergin 0-6 (four frees), W Dunphy 1-2, M Hennessy 0-2, J Corby, L Conway, C Hogan, C Dunne and A Corby 0-1 each.	Report	M Kavanagh 0-10 (six frees, two sidelines), P Purcell 1-1, J Kelly 0-4, T Dowling 0-2, B McGinley, J Ryan and E Bracken 0-1 each.

17 August 2025 Round 4	Rosenallis	0-15 - 0-20	The Harps	Laois Hire O'Moore Park
	D Dooley 0-6 (frees), J Lennon 0-4, B Fitzpatrick, C Cosgrove, J Hyland, J Keating and C Friel 0-1 each.	Report	C Comerford 0-13 (nine frees, two 65s), J Duggan, J Brophy, P Delaney, J Duggan, R Edwardds, E Murphy and M Monahan 0-1 each.

17 August 2025 Round 4	Ballinakill	0-20 - 3-24	Camross	Laois Hire O'Moore Park
	B Duggan 0-7 (four frees, two 65s), C Dwyer 0-6 (one sideline), E Drury 0-3, S Fitzpatrick and G Lynch 0-2 each.	Report	Z Keenan 1-12 (1-6 frees, 0-4 65s), M Keyes 1-3, T Cuddy 1-0, M Dowling 0-3, C Collier and J Cuddy 0-2 each, D Delaney and E Dowling 0-1 each.

5 September 2025 Round 5	Clough–Ballacolla	1-20 - 3-12	The Harps	Laois Hire O'Moore Park
	S Bergin 0-13 (0-12fs), A Corby 1-1, M Hennessy and C Dunne 0-2 each, K Mulhall and W Dunphy 0-1 each.	Report	P Delaney (1-0 pen, 0-2fs) and J Duggan 1-2 each, M Downey 1-1, C Comerford 0-4 (0-3fs), J Brophy, R Edwards and E Murphy 0-1 each.

6 September 2025 Round 5	Abbeyleix	0-16 - 1-19	Camross	Laois Hire O'Moore Park
	Cormac Byrne 0-9, E Rowland 0-2, Colin Byrne 0-2, C Walsh 0-1, E Fennelly 0-1, E Reilly 0-1.		Z Keenan 1-10, J Cuddy 1-1, M Keyes 0-2, E Cuddy 0-2, A Keenan 0-1, O Phelan 0-1, E Dowling 0-1, E Gaughan 0-1.

6 September 2025 Round 5	Portlaoise	3-11 - 1-27	Rathdowney–Errill	Laois Hire O'Moore Park
	A Bergin 2-6, C Raggett 1-0, DJ White 0-2, JM Foley 0-1, J Conroy 0-1, B O'Reilly 0-1.		M Kavanagh 0-15, T Dowling 1-2, B McGinley 0-4, J Kelly 0-3, P Purcell 0-2, J Ryan 0-1.

7 September 2025 Round 5	Rosenallis	2-17 - 1-15	Borris–Kilcotton	Laois Hire O'Moore Park
	D Dooley 0-9, J Keating 2-2, J Lennon 0-4, B Fitzpatrick 0-1, FC Fennell 0-1.		A Dunphy 0-5, S Phelan 1-0, PJ Scully 0-3, S Dunphy 0-2, E Quinlan 0-2, J Quinlan 0-1, D Carey 0-1, N Coss 0-1.

7 September 2025 Round 5	Ballinakill	2-19 - 2-18	Castletown	Laois Hire O'Moore Park
	C Dwyer 0-5, B O'Mara 1-1, B Duggan 0-4, G Lynch 0-3, S Fitzpatrick 0-3, E Dwyer 0-2, R Quinlan 0-1.		C Doran 1-5, K Cuddy 0-6, B Reddin 1-2, C McKelvey 0-1, T Cuddy 0-1, J Breen 0-1, R Mullaney 0-1, M Phelan 0-1.

== Relegation stage ==
=== Relegation playoff ===
4 October 2025 Playoff	Castletown	2-13 - 2-18	Portlaoise	Páirc Shéain Uí hUidhrín
	K Cuddy 0-5 (0-4fs, 0-1 65), M Phelan 1-1, J Phelan 1-0, C McKelvey 0-2 (0-1f), B Reddin, C Peters, T Cuddy, J Breen and R Mullaney 0-1 each.	Report	A Bergin 1-11 (1-0 pen, 0-10fs), DJ White 1-1, D Lynch 0-2, C Duggan, C Raggett, JM Foley and E Critchley 0-1 each.

== Knockout stage ==
=== Quarter-finals ===
21 September 2025 Quarter-final	Camross	3-14 - 1-22	Borris–Kilcotton	Laois Hire O'Moore Park
	Z Keenan 1-8 (0-5fs, 1-0 pen, 0-1 sideline), M Keyes 1-3, M Dowling 1-1, A Keenan and J Cuddy 0-1 each.	Report	PJ Scully 0-10 (0-7fs, 0-1 65), A Dunphy and D Carey 0-3 each, N Foyle and S Dunphy 0-2 each, C Stapleton and E Fleming (f) 0-1 each.

21 September 2025 Quarter-final	Rosenallis	0-19 - 0-22	Ballinakill	Laois Hire O'Moore Park
	D Dooley 0-8 (0-7fs), C Friel 0-3, J Lennon 0-2, B Fitzpatrick, P Keating, S Kelly (f), D Hartnett and J Friel 0-1 each.	Report	C Dwyer 0-12 (0-4fs, 0-1 sideline, 0-1 65), E Drury 0-5, E Dwyer and S Fitzpatrick 0-2 each, B Duggan 0-1.

=== Semi-finals ===
5 October 2025 Semi-final	Rathdowney–Errill	0-15 - 2-21	Camross	Laois Hire O'Moore Park
	M Kavanagh 0-5 (frees), J Kelly 0-4, P Purcell and T Fitzpatrick 0-2, P Rafter and R King 0-1 each	Report	T Keyes 0-6, C Collier 1-2, E Gaughan 0-4 (three frees), Z Keenan (frees) and L Delaney 0-3 each, D Drennan 1-0, O Phelan, M Dowling and J Cuddy 0-1 each.

5 October 2025 Semi-final	Clough–Ballacolla	3-23 - 0-23 (aet)	Ballinakill	Laois Hire O'Moore Park
	S Bergin 1-10 (0-7fs, 0-1 65), C Dunne 1-8 (0-3fs), W Dunphy 1-1, K Mulhall, A Corby, J Walshe and D Conway 0-1 each.	Report	C Dwyer 0-11 (0-10fs), B Duggan 0-3, S Fitzpatrick, B O’Mara, and S Downey 0-2 each, R Quinlan, E Drury, and G Lynch 0-1 each.

=== Final ===
19 October 2025 Final	Camross	2-15 - 2-21	Clough–Ballacolla	Laois Hire O'Moore Park
	Z Keenan 2-10 (1-9 frees, 0-1 65), J Cuddy, E Gaughan, E Cuddy, T Keyes and J Cuddy 0-1 each.	Report	S Bergin 1-13 (0-9 frees), J Walshe 0-3, W Dunphy 1-0, P Maher 0-2 (0-1 free), C Dunne, A Corby and J Corby 0-1 each.

== Championship statistics ==
=== Top scorers ===
Overall

Rank	Player	Club	Tally	Total	Matches	Average
1	Zane Keenan	Camross	7-68	89	8	11.12
2	Stephen Bergin	Clough–Ballacolla	2-69	75	7	10.71
3	Mark Kavanagh	Rathdowney–Errill	1-58	61	6	10.16
4	Aaron Dunphy	Borris–Kilcotton	1-51	54	6	9.00
5	Cha Dwyer	Ballinakill	1-49	52	7	7.42
6	Ciarán Comerford	The Harps	0-49	49	5	9.80
7	Cormac Byrne	Abbeyleix	1-44	47	5	9.60
8	Diarmuid Dooley	Rosenallis	0-44	44	6	7.33
9	Aaron Bergin	Portlaoise	4-27	39	3	13.00
10	Brian Duggan	Ballinakill	0-36	36	7	5.14

In a single game

Rank	Player	Club	Tally	Total	Opposition
1	Aaron Dunphy	Borris–Kilcotton	1-16	19	Abbeyleix
2	Zane Keenan	Camross	2-10	16	Clough–Ballacolla
2	Stephen Bergin	Clough–Ballacolla	1-13	16	Camross
4	Zane Keenan	Camross	1-12	15	Ballinakill
4	Zane Keenan	Camross	1-12	15	Rosenallis
4	Mark Kavanagh	Rathdowney–Errill	0-15	15	Portlaoise
7	Aaron Bergin	Portlaoise	1-11	14	Castletown
8	Aaron Bergin	Portlaoise	1-10	13	Castletown
8	Stephen Bergin	Clough–Ballacolla	1-10	13	Ballinakill
8	Zane Keenan	Camross	1-10	13	Abbeyleix
8	Ciarán Comerford	The Harps	0-13	13	Ballinakill
8	Ciarán Comerford	The Harps	0-13	13	Rosenallis
8	Stephen Bergin	Clough–Ballacolla	0-13	13	The Harps

=== Miscellaneous ===
- The round 1 game between Portlaoise and Camross ended in confusion regarding the score line. The referee had Portlaoise winning by a point, 2-22 to 5-12, however, following a review it was subsequently clarified that the game actually ended in a draw, 2-22 to 5-13.
- The round 2 game between Clough–Ballacolla and Borris–Kilcotton was abandoned following a serious injury to Clough–Ballacolla player Tommy Brennan.
