= James Keyes =

Irish hurler

Personal information
- Native name: Séamus Mac Aoidh (Irish)
- Born: 1999 (age 26–27) Raheen, County Laois, Ireland
- Occupation: Commercial manager

Sport
- Sport: Hurling
- Position: Right wing-forward
Clubs
- Years: Club
- St Fintan's, Colt; Colt–Shanahoe
Club titles
- Laois titles: 0
College
- Years: College
- DCU Dóchas Éireann
College titles
- Fitzgibbon titles: 0
Inter-county
- Years: County
- 2020–present: Laois
Inter-county titles
- Leinster titles: 0
- All-Irelands: 0
- NHL: 0
- All Stars: 0

James Keyes (born 1999) is an Irish hurler. At club level he plays with Colt–Shanahoe and at inter-county level with the Laois senior hurling team.

== Career ==
Keyes first played for St Fintan's, Colt at juvenile and underage levels before progressing to the club's adult section. He later lined out with the Colt–Shanahoe club, following an amalgamation in 2020. Keyes was amongst the goal-scorers when Colt–Shanahoe won the Laois IHC title in 2023, following a 4–15 to 0–14 win over Trumera in the final.

At inter-county level, Keyes first played for Laois during a two-year tenure with the minor team in 2016 and 2017. He later spent one year with the under-20 team in 2019. Keyes made his senior team debut in a National Hurling League game against Wexford in January 2020.

Keyes claimed his first silverware in 2024, when Laois beat Carlow to win the National Hurling League Division 2A title. He added a Division 2 medal to his collection in 2026. Keyes was part of the Laois team that lost consecutive Joe McDonagh Cup finals to Offaly (2024) and Kildare (2025). He came on as a substitute when Laois beat Carlow by 1–27 to 1–18 to win the Joe McDonagh Cup title in June 2026.

At international level, Keyes earned a call-up to the national under-21 team for the Shinty–Hurling International Series in November 2019.

== Honours ==
Colt–Shanahoe

- Laois Intermediate Hurling Championship (1): 2023

Laois

- Joe McDonagh Cup (1): 2026
- National Hurling League Division 2 (1): 2026
- National Hurling League Division 2A (1): 2024
