= Laois county hurling team =

Hurling team

Laois
- Sport: Hurling
- Irish: Laois
- Nickname(s): The O'Moore County
- County board: Laois GAA
- Manager: Tommy Fitzgerald
- Home venue(s): O'Moore Park, Portlaoise

Recent competitive record
- Last championship title: 2026 Joe McDonagh Cup
- Current NHL Division: 1B (6th in 2025; relegated to Division 2)
- Last league title: None
First colours	Second colours

The Laois county hurling team represents Laois in hurling and is governed by Laois GAA, the county board of the Gaelic Athletic Association. The team competes in the Joe McDonagh Cup and the National Hurling League.

Laois's home ground is O'Moore Park, Portlaoise. The team's manager is Tommy Fitzgerald.

The team last won the Leinster Senior Championship in 1949, the All-Ireland Senior Championship in 1915 and has never won the National League.

== History ==
Laois won one All-Ireland Senior Hurling Championship (SHC) title, in 1915, when the day was so wet the team reportedly played the second half in their overcoats.

Laois has also won three All-Ireland Senior B Hurling Championship titles.

The hurlers reached National Hurling League (NHL) semi-finals in 1981 and 1983. The team then lost the Centenary Cup hurling final to Cork in 1984.

Laois most recently contested the Leinster Senior Hurling Championship final in 1985, with the result a defeat to Offaly.

The hurlers were back in the NHL semi-final in 1996.

Laois won the Joe McDonagh Cup in 2019, and went on to shock Dublin in the preliminary quarter-final the next week and advance to the All-Ireland SHC quarter-final. This was considered one of the greatest shocks in the history of the championship. The manager departed amid controversy in November 2020 after his criticisms of county board officials appeared on a podcast.

== Panel ==
Team as per Laois vs Tipperary in the All-Ireland SHC quarter-final, 14 July 2019

No.	Player	Position	Club
1	Enda Rowland	Goalkeeper	Abbeyleix
2	Lee Cleere	Right corner-back	Clough–Ballacolla
3	Matthew Whelan	Full-back	Borris-in-Ossory–Kilcotton
4	Joe Phelan	Left corner-back	Camross
5	Jack Kelly	Right half-back	Rathdowney–Errill
6	Ryan Mullaney	Centre-back	Castletown
7	Pádraig Delaney	Left half-back	The Harps
8	John Lennon	Midfield	Rosenallis
9	Paddy Purcell	Midfield	Rathdowney–Errill
10	Aaron Dunphy	Right half-forward	Borris-in-Ossory–Kilcotton
11	Mark Kavanagh	Centre-forward	Rathdowney–Errill
12	Éanna Lyons	Left half-forward	Ballyfin
13	Willie Dunphy	Right corner-forward	Clough–Ballacolla
14	Charles Dwyer	Full-forward	Ballinakill
15	Ross King	Left corner-forward	Rathdowney–Errill
16	Thomas Dunphy	Substitute	Camross
17	Eric Killeen	Substitute	Rathdowney–Errill

No.	Player	Position	Club
18	Andrew Mortimer	Substitute	Camross
19	Lorcan Burke	Substitute	Camross
20	Colm Stapleton	Substitute	Borris-in-Ossory–Kilcotton
21	Conor Phelan	Substitute	Castletown
22	Eoin Gaughan	Substitute	Camross
23	Neil Foyle	Substitute	Borris-in-Ossory–Kilcotton
24	Aaron Bergin	Substitute	Portlaoise
25	Stephen Bergin	Substitute	Clough–Ballacolla
26	Stephen Maher	Substitute	Clough–Ballacolla
–	Donncha Hartnett	Substitute	Mountmellick
–	Jake Cranny	Substitute	Abbeyleix
–	Daniel Comerford	Substitute	The Harps
–	Mark Dowling	Substitute	Camross
–	Ciaran Comerford	Substitute	The Harps
–	Ben Conroy	Substitute	Slieve Bloom
–	Patrick Keating	Substitute	Rosenallis

^{INJ} Player has had an injury which has affected recent involvement with the county team.
^{RET} Player has since retired from the county team.
^{WD} Player has since withdrawn from the county team due to a non-injury issue.

== Management team ==
Appointed November 2024:

- Manager: Tommy Fitzgerald
- Lead coach: Niall Corcoran

== Managerial history ==
Laois has a history of appointing "foreign" managers, with Georgie Leahy the most successful.

Georgie Leahy 1979–1985

Jimmy Doyle 1985–1987

Paddy Kelly 1987–1989

Georgie Leahy (2) 1989–1991

Paddy Doyle 1991–1993

Pat Critchley 1993–1995

Babs Keating 1995–1997

Pádraig Horan 1997–2000

Seán Cuddy 2000–2001

Pat Delaney 2001–2002

Paudie Butler 2002–2005

Dinny Cahill 2005–2006

Damien Fox 2006–2008

Niall Rigney 2008–2010

Brendan Fennelly 2010–2011

Teddy McCarthy 2011–2012

Séamus Plunkett 2012–2015

Ger Cunningham 2015**

Séamus Plunkett (2) 2015–2016

Éamonn Kelly 2016–2018

Eddie Brennan 2018–2020

Séamus Plunkett (3) 2020–2022

Willie Maher 2022–2024

Darren Gleeson 2024

Tommy Fitzgerald 2024–

**=In a caretaker role

== Players ==
=== Records ===
- James Duggan scored 5–2 (17 points) in the first half of the 2025 Joe McDonagh Cup game against Kerry. On what was his championship debut, Duggan's first half total made him the county's first player to score five goals in the same championship match since a player named Delaney in 1939.

=== All Stars ===
Laois has 1 All Star.

1985: Pat Critchley

== Competitive record ==
Laois's only All-Ireland Senior Hurling Championship title win is from 1915.

Laois won three All-Ireland Senior B Hurling Championship titles, in 1977, 1979 and 2002.

Séamus Plunkett managed the team to its third title in 2002.

- 1 John Lyons
- 2 Pat Mahon
- 3 Paul Cuddy
- 4 Michael McEvoy
- 5 Joe Phelan
- 6 Cyril Cuddy
- 7 Owen Bergin
- 8 Ollie Dowling
- 9 James Young
- 10 Fionán O'Sullivan
- 11 Darren Rooney
- 12 Michael Dunphy
- 13 Tommy Fitzgerald
- 14 David Cuddy
- 15 P. J. Peacock

Subs used: Declan Conroy for M. Dunphy; Jack O'Shea for P. J. Peacock; Lar Mahon for O. Bergin; Brian Ferns for F. O'Sullivan; Eamon Jackman for T. Fitzgerald

== Honours ==
=== National ===
- All-Ireland Senior Hurling Championship
  - (gold) Winners (1): 1915
  - (silver) Runners-up (2): 1914, 1949
- All-Ireland Senior B Hurling Championship
  - (gold) Winners (3): 1977, 1979, 2002
- Joe McDonagh Cup
  - (gold) Winners (2): 2019 2026
  - (silver) Runners-up (2): 2024, 2025
- National Hurling League
  - (bronze) Semi-finalists (3): 1981, 1983, 1996
- National Hurling League Division 2
  - (gold) Winners (3): 1960, 1965, 2026
- All-Ireland Under-21 B Hurling Championship
  - (gold) Winners (2): 2004, 2006

=== Provincial ===
- Leinster Senior Hurling Championship
  - (gold) Winners (3): 1914, 1915, 1949
  - (silver) Runners-up (12): 1889, 1890, 1891, 1909, 1912, 1930, 1931, 1935, 1936, 1948, 1951, 1985
- Leinster Junior Hurling Championship
  - (gold) Winners (3): 1910, 1914, 1933
- Walsh Cup
  - (gold) Winners (2): 1980, 1991
- Walsh Shield
  - (gold) Winners (2): 2008, 2010
- Kehoe Cup
  - (gold) Winners (1): 1982
- Leinster Under-21 Hurling Championship
  - (gold) Winners (1): 1983
- Leinster Minor Hurling Championship
  - (gold) Winners (4): 1934, 1940, 1941, 1964
