= 1998 Laois Senior Hurling Championship =

Annual hurling competition season

- Champions: Portlaoise (10th title); Niall Rigney (captain); Séamus Plunkett (manager)
- Runners-up: The Harps

The 1998 Laois Senior Hurling Championship was the 105th staging of the Laois Senior Hurling Championship since its establishment by the Laois County Board in 1888.

Castletown were the defending champions.

The final was played on 20 September 1998 at O'Moore Park in Portlaoise, between Portlaoise and The Harps, in what was their second meeting in the final overall. Portlaoise won the match by 0–13 to 0–11 to claim their 10th championship title overall and a first title in seven years.

== Results ==
=== Semi-finals ===
| 6 September 1998 Semi-final | Portlaoise | 2-05 - 0-07 | Clonad | O'Moore Park |

| 6 September 1998 Semi-final | The Harps | 3-15 - 2-10 | Camross | O'Moore Park |

=== Final ===
| 20 September 1998 Final | Portlaoise | 0-13 - 0-11 | The Harps | O'Moore Park |
