= Fiachra C–Fennell =

Irish hurler

Personal information
- Native name: Fiachra Ó C-Fionnghail (Irish)
- Born: 2004 (age 21–22) Rosenallis, County Laois, Ireland
- Occupation: Analytical scientist

Sport
- Sport: Hurling
- Position: Right wing-back
Club
- Years: Club
- Rosenallis
Club titles
- Laois titles: 0
College
- Years: College
- 2016-2020: NUI Galway
College titles
- Fitzgibbon titles: 0
Inter-county
- Years: County
- 2020–present: Laois
Inter-county titles
- Leinster titles: 0
- All-Irelands: 0
- NHL: 0
- All Stars: 0

Fiachra Culliton–Fennell (born 1997) is an Irish hurler. At club level he plays with Rosenallis and at inter-county level with the Laois senior hurling team.

== Career ==
C-Fennell attended Clonaslee College and played in all grades of hurling and Gaelic football during his time there. He later studied at NUI Galway.

At club level, C-Fennell was a dual player at all levels with Rosenallis. He won a Laois JFC and Laois IHC double in 2016. These titles were later followed with a Leinster Club JFC title, following a 1–11 to 1–08 win over Bracknagh in the final. C-Fennell had further title successes in 2019, when he claimed Laois IFC and Laois SAHC winners' medals.

At inter-county level, C-Fennell first appeared for Laois as a member of the under-21 team in 2018. He made his senior team debut in a National Hurling League game against Wexford in January 2020.

C-Fennell claimed his first silverware in 2024, when Laois beat Carlow to win the National Hurling League Division 2A title. He added a Division 2 medal to his collection in 2026. C-Fennell was part of the Laois team that lost consecutive Joe McDonagh Cup finals to Offaly in 2024 and Kildare in 2025, when he was also team captain. He lined out at wing-back when Laois beat Carlow by 1–27 to 1–18 to win the Joe McDonagh Cup title in June 2026.

== Personal life ==
His brothers also lined out at inter-county level, with Ruaidhrí C–Fennell playing with the Laois senior football team and Cathal C–Fennell playing with the Laois senior hurling team. His sister, Líadan C–Fennell, captained the Laois junior camogie team in 2024. Youngest sister Deirbhile C-Fennell played intercounty at underage.

== Honours ==
Rosenallis

- Laois Senior A Hurling Championship (1): 2019
- Laois Intermediate Football Championship (1): 2019
- Laois Intermediate Hurling Championship (1): 2016
- Leinster Junior Club Football Championship (1): 2016
- Laois Junior Football Championship (1): 2016

Laois

- Joe McDonagh Cup (1): 2026
- National Hurling League Division 2 (1): 2026
- National Hurling League Division 2A (1): 2024
