= 2004 Laois Senior Hurling Championship =

Annual hurling competition season

- Champions: Portlaoise (11th title); Joe Phelan (captain); Damien Fox (manager)
- Runners-up: Castletown; Cyril Cuddy (captain); Michael Doyle (manager)

The 2004 Laois Senior Hurling Championship was the 111th staging of the Laois Senior Hurling Championship since its establishment by the Laois County Board in 1888.

Castletown were the defending champions.

The final was played on 3 October 2004 at O'Moore Park in Portlaoise, between Portlaoise and Castletown, in what was their fourth meeting in the final overall. Portlaoise won the match by 2–08 to 0–07 to claim their 11th championship title overall and a first title in six years.

== Results ==
=== Semi-finals ===
19 September 2004 Semi-final	Castletown	3-09 - 1-06	Mountrath	O'Moore Park

25 September 2004 Semi-final	Portlaoise	1-17 - 0-09	Ballinakill	O'Moore Park

=== Final ===
3 October 2004 Final	Portlaoise	2-08 - 0-07	Castletown	O'Moore Park
