= 1999 Laois Senior Hurling Championship =

Annual hurling competition season

- Champions: Castletown (3rd title); John Lyons (captain)
- Runners-up: Portlaoise

The 1999 Laois Senior Hurling Championship was the 106th staging of the Laois Senior Hurling Championship since its establishment by the Laois County Board in 1888.

Portlaoise were the defending champions.

The final was played on 19 September 1999 at O'Moore Park in Portlaoise, between Portlaoise and Castletown, in what was their second meeting in the final overall. Castletown won the match by 2–06 to 1–06 to claim their third championship title overall and a first title in two years.

== Results ==
=== Semi-finals ===
29 August 1999 Semi-final	Castletown	0-12 - 0-07	The Harps	O'Moore Park

29 August 1999 Semi-final	Portlaoise	0-10 - 1-07	Clonaslee	O'Moore Park

4 September 1999 Semi-final replay	Portlaoise	0-12 - 0-09	Clonaslee	O'Moore Park

=== Final ===
19 September 1999 Final	Castletown	2-06 - 1-06	Portlaoise	O'Moore Park
