= 2002 Laois Senior Hurling Championship =

Annual hurling competition season

- Champions: Castletown (6th title); Paul Cuddy (captain); Richie Power (manager)
- Runners-up: Tinnahinch; Séamus Dooley (captain)

The 2002 Laois Senior Hurling Championship was the 109th staging of the Laois Senior Hurling Championship since its establishment by the Laois County Board in 1888.

Castletown were the defending champions.

The final was played on 15 September 2002 at O'Moore Park in Portlaoise, between Castletown and Tinnahinch, in what was their second consecutive meeting in the final. Castletown won the match by 4–09 to 2–04 to claim their sixth championship title overall and a fourth consecutive title.

== Results ==
=== Quarter-finals ===
25 August 2002 Quarter-final	Tinnahinch	1-14 - 1-10	Camross	O'Moore Park

31 August 2002 Quarter-final	Ballinakill Gaels	1-10 - 0-18	Rathdowney	Raheen Grounds

=== Semi-finals ===
1 September 2002 Semi-final	The Harps	1-14 - 1-14	Tinnahinch	O'Moore Park

7 September 2002 Semi-final replay	The Harps	3-08 - 4-09	Tinnahinch	Kelly Daly Park

7 September 2002 Semi-final	Castletown	1-07 - 0-07	Rathdowney	O'Moore Park

=== Final ===
15 September 2002 Final	Castletown	4-09 - 2-04	Tinnahinch	O'Moore Park
