= 2005 Laois Senior Hurling Championship =

Annual hurling competition season

- Champions: Castletown (8th title); Robbie Delaney (captain); Tony Delaney (manager)
- Runners-up: Portlaoise; Damien Keenan (captain); Frank Keenan (manager)

The 2005 Laois Senior Hurling Championship was the 112th staging of the Laois Senior Hurling Championship since its establishment by the Laois County Board in 1888.

Portlaoise were the defending champions, however, they were beaten by Castletown in the semi-finals.

The final, a replay, was played on 30 October 2005 at O'Moore Park in Portlaoise, between Castletown and Camross, in what was their third meeting in the final overall. Castletown won the match by 1–08 to 0–10 to claim their eighth championship title overall and a first title in two years.

== Results ==
=== Semi-finals ===
2 October 2005 Semi-final	Castletown	1-13 - 0-11	Portlaoise	O'Moore Park

2 October 2005 Semi-final	Camross	2-12 - 2-12	Rathdowney–Errill	O'Moore Park

9 October 2005 Semi-final replay	Camross	1-10 - 0-11	Rathdowney–Errill	O'Moore Park

=== Final ===
23 October 2005 Final	Castletown	0-13 - 1-10	Camross	O'Moore Park

=== Final replay ===
30 October 2005 Final replay	Castletown	1-08 - 0-10	Camross	O'Moore Park
