= Laois Intermediate Hurling Championship =

Annual hurling competition for intermediate clubs in Laois

- Irish: Craobh Idirmheánach Iomáint Laoise
- Code: Hurling
- Founded: 1908; 118 years ago
- Region: Laois (GAA)
- Trophy: Hetherington Cup
- No. of teams: 8
- Title holders: Slieve Bloom (2nd title)
- Most titles: Clonaslee (8 titles)
- Sponsors: Laois Shopping Centre
- Official website: http://www.laoisgaa.ie

The Laois Intermediate Hurling Championship (abbreviated to the Laois IHC) is an annual hurling competition organised by the Laois County Board of the Gaelic Athletic Association for the third tier hurling teams in the county of Laois in Ireland.

In its current format, the Laois Intermediate Championship begins with a group stage in mid-summer. The eight participating teams are divided into two groups of four and play each other in a round-robin system. The three top-ranking teams in each group proceed to the knockout phase that culminates with the final match at O'Moore Park.

The title has been won by 36 different clubs, 27 of which have won the title more than once. Clonaslee is the most successful team in the tournament's history, having won it eight times. Slieve Bloom are the title holders after defeating The Harps by 3–20 to 3–09 in the 2026 final.

== Format ==
=== Group stage ===
The eight teams are divided into two groups of four. Over the course of the group stage each team plays once against the others in the group, resulting in each team being guaranteed at least three games. Two points are awarded for a win, one for a draw and zero for a loss. The teams are ranked in the group stage table by points gained, then scoring difference and then their head-to-head record. The top two teams in each group qualify for the knock-out stage.

=== Knockout stage ===
Following the completion of the group stage, the top three teams from each group advance to the knockout stage. The two top-ranking teams receive byes to separate semi-finals.

- Quarter-finals: The second and third-ranked teams in each group contest this round. The two winners from these two games advance to the semi-finals.
- Semi-finals: The two quarter-final winners and the top-ranked teams contest this round. The two winners from these two games advance to the final.
- Final: The two semi-final winners contest the final. The winning team are declared champions.

=== Promotion and relegation ===
At the end of the championship, the winning team is automatically promoted to the Laois Premier Intermediate Championship for the following season. The two bottom-placed teams from the group stage take part in a playoff, with the losing team being relegated to the Laois Junior Championship.

== Teams ==
=== 2026 teams ===
Club
Abbeyleix
Borris-in-Ossory-Kilcotton
Ballypickas
Clough–Ballacolla GAA
Slieve Bloom
St Fintan's, Mountrath
The Harps
Trumera

== Qualification for subsequent competitions ==
At the end of the championship, the winning team qualify to the subsequent Leinster Junior Club Hurling Championship.

== Sponsorship ==
Laois Shopping Centre is the title sponsor of the championship.

== Roll of honour ==
#	Club	Wins	Years won
1	Clonaslee	8	1936, 1943, 1955, 1962, 1969, 1982, 1987, 1997
2	Camross	6	1938, 1958, 1983, 2000, 2010, 2019
3	Mountrath	5	1941, 1949, 1990, 1996, 2001
4	Abbeyleix	4	1908, 1966, 1978, 2007
4	Cullohill	4	1909, 1946, 1954, 1973
4	Borris-in-Ossory	4	1940, 1953, 1988, 2009
4	Colt	4	1965, 1971, 1979, 2008
4	Ballyfin	4	1970, 1985, 2006, 2011
4	Castletown	4	1975, 1980, 1986, 1993
4	Trumera	4	2004, 2015, 2017, 2021
11	Ballacolla	3	1910, 1938, 1972,
11	Durrow	3	1944, 1959, 1976
11	Kilcotton	3	1963, 1992, 2002
11	Rosenallis	3	1989, 1999, 2016
11	Clough–Ballacolla	3	1991, 1998, 2022
16	Portlaoise	2	1935, 1942
16	Ballypickas	2	1937, 1964
16	Rovers	2	1945, 1948
16	Shanahoe	2	1951, 2013
16	St Canice's	2	1952, 1957
16	Ballinakill	2	1974, 1995
16	Ratheniska	2	1961, 1977
16	Rathdowney	2	1960, 2003
16	Rathdowney–Errill	2	2005, 2020
16	Mountmellick	2	1967, 2024
16	Borris-in-Ossory/Kilcotton	2	2012, 2014
16	Slieve Bloom	2	2018, 2026
28	Ballygeehan	1	1913
28	Kyle	1	1947
28	Castlemore	1	1950
28	Cuddagh	1	1956
28	St Conleth's	1	1968
28	Errill	1	1981
28	Park–Ratheniska	1	1984
28	Colt–Shanahoe	1	2023
28	Clonad GAA	1	2025

== List of finals ==
Year	Winners		Runners-up		Venue	#
Year	Club	Score	Club	Score	Venue	#
2017	Trumera	0–15	Rathdowney–Errill	0–14	MW Hire O'Moore Park	
2018	Slieve Bloom	3–11	Camross	1–12	MW Hire O'Moore Park	
2019	Camross	3–18	Borris–Kilcotton	0–13	MW Hire O'Moore Park	
2020	Rathdowney–Errill	2-26	Trumera	0–13	MW Hire O'Moore Park	
2021	Trumera	1–19	Clough–Ballacolla	1–16	MW Hire O'Moore Park	
2022	Clough–Ballacolla	2–14	Mountmellick	2-09	MW Hire O'Moore Park	
2023	Colt–Shanahoe	4–15	Trumera	0–14	Laois Hire O'Moore Park	
2024	Mountmellick	4–17	Abbeyleix	1–16	Laois Hire O'Moore Park	Note: both teams promoted due to Championship restructure
2025	Clonad	1–18	Mountrath	1–13		
2026	Slieve Bloom	3-20	The Harps	3-09	Laois Hire O'Moore Park	

== See also ==
- Laois Senior Hurling Championship (Tier 1)
- Laois Premier Intermediate Hurling Championship (Tier 2)
- Laois Junior Hurling Championship (Tier 4)
