= Colt–Shanahoe GAA =

GAA club in County Laois, Ireland

Colt–Shanahoe
- Coillte–Seanchua
- Founded: 2020
- County: Laois
- Colours: Blue and red
- Grounds: Páirc Shéain Uí hUidhrín

Playing kits
Standard colours

Colt–Shanahoe GAA is a Gaelic Athletic Association club located in the village of Raheen, County Laois, Ireland. The club is primarily concerned with the game of hurling.

== History ==
Located in the parish of Raheen just outside Abbeyleix, County Laois, Colt–Shanahoe GAA Club was founded following an amalgamation between the existing St Fintan's, Colt and Shanahoe clubs in 2020. The new club enjoyed its first major success in 2023 when the Laois IHC title was secured after a defeat of Trumera in the final.

== Honours ==
- Laois Intermediate Hurling Championship (1): 2023

== Notable players ==
- James Keyes: Shinty–Hurling Under-21 International Series-winner (2019)
