= Niall Corcoran =

Irish hurler

Personal information
- Native name: Níall Ó Corcráin (Irish)
- Born: 9 July 1982 (age 44) Ballinasloe, Ireland
- Occupation: Games Promotion Officer
- Height: 1.78 m (5 ft 10 in)

Sport
- Sport: Hurling
- Position: Left corner-back
Clubs
- Years: Club
- 2008–: Meelick–Eyrecourt; Kilmacud Crokes
Club titles
- Dublin titles: 2
Inter-county
- Years: County
- 2008–2016: Dublin
Inter-county titles
- Leinster titles: 1
- NHL: 1

Niall Corcoran (born 9 July 1982) is a hurling coach and former player at senior level for the Dublin county team until 2016.

== County Hurling ==
He won the All-Ireland Minor Hurling Championship with Galway in 2000. He made his championship debut with Dublin against Westmeath in the Leinster Senior Hurling Championship quarter-final. Corcoran won the National Hurling League with Dublin in 2011.

Corcoran coaches with Kilmacud Crokes. Corcoran is easy to pick out on the pitch, as he wears a distinctive black and red Mycro helmet.

In 2018, Corcoran joined Eddie Brennan's backroom team when Brennan was manager of the Laois senior hurlers. After his first spell coaching the Laois hurlers, Corcoran joined Davy Fitzgerald's Wexford backroom team when Brennan left the Laois job at the end of 2020. Corcoran rejoined Laois as "lead coach" when Tommy Fitzgerald became Laois senior hurling manager in November 2024.

On 2nd September 2025, Corcoran joined Derek Lyng's Kilkenny Senior hurling coaching team, along with Eddie Brennan. For the forthcoming 2026 season
