= 2001 Laois Senior Hurling Championship =

Annual hurling competition season

- Champions: Castletown (5th title); Fionan O'Suillivan (captain); Paddy Kirwan (manager)
- Runners-up: Tinnahinch; James Young (captain); Damien Fox (manager)

The 2001 Laois Senior Hurling Championship was the 108th staging of the Laois Senior Hurling Championship since its establishment by the Laois County Board in 1888.

Castletown were the defending champions.

The final was played on 16 September 2001 at O'Moore Park in Portlaoise, between Castletown and Tinnahinch, in what was their first ever meeting in the final. Castletown won the match by 2–19 to 1–08 to claim their fifth championship title overall and a third consecutive title.

== Results ==
=== Quarter-finals ===
| 12 August 2001 Quarter-final | Tinnahinch | 2-10 - 1-05 | Clough–Ballacolla | O'Moore Park |

| 12 August 2001 Quarter-final | Rathdowney | 3-07 - 3-07 | Ballinakill Gaels | O'Moore Park |

| 18 August 2001 Quarter-final replay | Rathdowney | 1-17 - 2-11 (aet) | Ballinakill Gaels | O'Moore Park |

=== Semi-finals ===
| 25 August 2001 Semi-final | Camross | 1-10 - 1-13 | Tinnahinch | O'Moore Park |

| 1 September 2001 Semi-final | Castletown | 1-12 - 0-07 | Rathdowney | O'Moore Park |

=== Final ===
| 16 September 2001 Final | Castletown | 2-19 - 1-08 | Tinnahinch | O'Moore Park |
