= 2000 Laois Senior Hurling Championship =

Annual hurling competition season

- Champions: Castletown (4th title); Pat Phelan (captain); Mick Peters (manager)
- Runners-up: Camross; Pakie Cuddy (captain); Seán Cuddy (manager)

The 2000 Laois Senior Hurling Championship was the 107th staging of the Laois Senior Hurling Championship since its establishment by the Laois County Board in 1888.

Castletown were the defending champions.

The final was played on 1 October 2000 at O'Moore Park in Portlaoise, between Castletown and Camross, in what was their second meeting in the final overall. Castletown won the match by 3–09 to 2–05 to claim their fourth championship title overall and a second consecutive title.

== Results ==
=== Semi-finals ===
3 September 2000 Semi-final	Camross	2-13 - 2-09	The Harps	O'Moore Park

3 September 2000 Semi-final	Castletown	1-15 - 1-12	Portlaoise	O'Moore Park

=== Final ===
1 October 2000 Final	Castletown	3-09 - 2-05	Camross	O'Moore Park
