= Shanahoe GAA =

GAA club in County Laois, Ireland

Shanahoe
- Sean Chua
- Founded: 1980
- County: Laois
- Colours: Red and black
- Coordinates: 52°54′34.63″N 7°24′19.48″W

Playing kits
Standard colours

Shanahoe GAA is a Gaelic Athletic Association hurling and gaelic football club in the village of Shanahoe, County Laois, Ireland, with pitches about two kilometres away.

The club is located in the parish of Raheen.

The club colours are red and black.

Since 2020 it amalgamated with Colt to play hurling as Colt–Shanahoe.

Since 2020 football is the way Shanahoe is now represented.

== History ==
The current club was founded as recently as 1980 and is located in the parish of Raheen, County Laois.

An older Shanahoe hurling club won the Laois Intermediate Hurling Championship back in 1951, having won the Laois Junior Hurling Championship three years previously.

In 1999, the current Shanahoe club enjoyed its most memorable day when Declan Cuddy captained them to a 4–7 to 0–6 win over Ballypickas in the Laois Junior Hurling Championship final. Football is very much a secondary sport in the club but in 2005 Shanahoe won the All-County Football League Division 5 title and also reached the Laois Junior C Football Championship final. The club colours are red and black.

== Achievements ==
- Laois Intermediate Hurling Championship (1) 1951
- Laois Junior Hurling Championship: (1)

1948, 1999

- Laois All-County Football League Div. 5: (1) 2005
