= Ryan Mullaney =

Irish hurler (born 1996)

Personal information
- Native name: Riain Ó Maoileanaigh (Irish)
- Born: 1996 (age 29–30) Castletown, County Laois, Ireland
- Height: 6 ft 9 in (206 cm)

Sport
- Sport: Hurling
- Position: Centre-Back
Club
- Years: Club
- Castletown
Club titles
- Laois titles: 0
College
- Years: College
- Carlow Institute of Technology
College titles
- Fitzgibbon titles: 0
Inter-county
- Years: County
- 2015-present: Laois
Inter-county titles
- Leinster titles: 0
- All-Irelands: 0
- NHL: 0
- All Stars: 0

Ryan Mullaney (born 1996) hurler who plays for Laois Senior Championship club Castletown and at inter-county level with the Laois senior hurling team. He usually lines out as a centre-back.

== Honours ==
Laois

- Joe McDonagh Cup (1): 2019
