= 1997 Laois Senior Hurling Championship =

Annual hurling competition season

- Champions: Castletown (2nd title); Éamonn Kirwan (captain)
- Runners-up: The Harps; Tommy Kenna (captain)

The 1997 Laois Senior Hurling Championship was the 104th staging of the Laois Senior Hurling Championship since its establishment by the Laois County Board in 1888.

Camross were the defending champions, however, they were beaten by The Harps in the semi-finals.

The final was played on 7 September 1997 at O'Moore Park in Portlaoise, between Castletown and The Harps, in what was their first ever meeting in the final. Castletown won the match by 3–14 to 2–09 to claim their second championship title overall and a first title in two years.

== Results ==
=== Semi-finals ===
17 August 1997 Semi-final	Castletown	2-16 - 1-13	Portlaoise	O'Moore Park

17 August 1997 Semi-final	The Harps	1-11 - 0-07	Camross	O'Moore Park

=== Final ===
7 September 1997 Final	Castletown	3-14 - 2-09	The Harps	O'Moore Park
