= Ballypickas GAA =

GAA club in County Laois, Ireland

Ballypickas
- Baile Piocas
- Founded: 1915
- County: Laois
- Nickname: The Belgies
- Colours: Green and yellow hoops
- Grounds: Cobbler's Hill
- Coordinates: 52°54′47.67″N 7°17′40.31″W

Playing kits
Standard colours

Ballypickas GAA is a Gaelic Athletic Association hurling club in County Laois, Ireland. Ballypickas is located near Abbeyleix and the club grounds are at the quaintly named Cobbler's Hill. The club colours are green and gold hoops.

== History ==
The club has won many honours over the year's including the Laois Intermediate Hurling Championship twice, in 1937 and 1964.

Ballypickas holds the record for wins in the Laois Junior Hurling Championship with no less than ten titles in the grade. The first of these came back in 1931, with the most recent in 2024.

Ballypickas returned to winning ways in 2007 with a great win in the final of the Laois Junior B Hurling Championship over The Harps and a win over St. Fintans, Colt in the final of the Laois Junior C Hurling Championship to complete a memorable championship double.

Ballypickas hurling players usually play their football with Spink or Ballyroan.

== Achievements ==
- Laois Intermediate Hurling Championships: (2) 1937, 1964
- Laois Junior Hurling Championships: (10) 1931, 1936, 1945, 1955, 1963, 1985, 1994, 2021, 2024
- Leinster Special Junior Hurling Championship Winners (1) 2015
- Laois Junior B Hurling Championships: (1) 2007
- Laois Junior C Hurling Championships: (1) 2007
