= Lee Cleere =

Irish hurler

Personal information
- Native name: Laoi de Cléir (Irish)
- Born: 1998 (age 27–28) Clough, County Laois, Ireland

Sport
- Sport: Hurling
- Position: Right corner-back
Club
- Years: Club
- 2015-present: Clough–Ballacolla
Club titles
- Laois titles: 1
Inter-county
- Years: County
- 2017-present: Laois
Inter-county titles
- Leinster titles: 0
- All-Irelands: 0
- NHL: 0
- All Stars: 0

Lee Cleere (born 1998) is an Irish hurler who plays for Laois Senior Championship club Clough–Ballacolla and at inter-county level with Laois senior hurling team. He usually lines out as a right corner-back.

== Honours ==
Clough–Ballacolla

- Laois Senior Hurling Championship (1): 2015

Laois

- Joe McDonagh Cup (1): 2019

Sporting positions
| Preceded by | Laois Minor Hurling Captain; 2016 | Succeeded by |
