= Castletown, County Laois =

Village in County Laois, Ireland

Castletown Baile an Chaisleáin
- Village
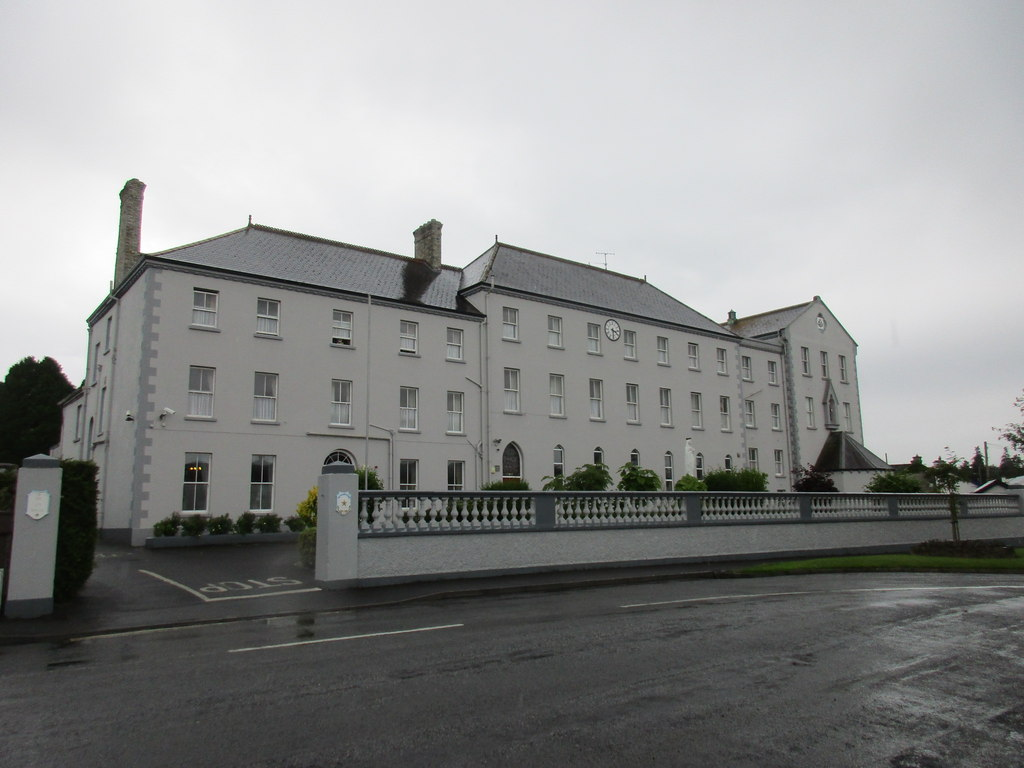
- De La Salle Brothers building in Castletown

- Location in Ireland
- Coordinates: 52°58′37″N 7°29′39″W
- Country: Ireland
- Province: Leinster
- County: County Laois

Population (2016)
  - Total: 436
- Time zone: UTC+0 (WET)
  - Summer (DST): UTC-1 (IST (WEST))

Castletown (Irish: Baile an Chaisleáin) is a village and also an ecclesiastical parish in County Laois in Ireland.

== History ==
The older Irish name for the village was Baile Chaisleáin Ua bhFoirchealláin (meaning "castle-town of Uí Fhoirchealláin"). This has been anglicised as Ballycashlan-Offerillan and Ballycaslane-Offeralane. Uí Fhoirchealláin is the name of the parish and was added to distinguish it from another Castletown.

According to an extract from A Topographical Dictionary of Ireland, published in 1837 by Samuel Lewis, Castletown was then "a village in the Parish of Offerlane, barony of Upper Ossory, Queen's county, and province of Leinster, 1 3/4 miles (S.by W.) from Mountrath; containing 367 inhabitants. It takes its name from an ancient castle, occupying a commanding situation on the bank of the River Nore, and which, in the early part of the 16th century, was garrisoned by Sir Oliver Norris, son-in-law of the Earl of Ormonde, with a view to curb the power of the Fitzpatricks, to whom it was afterwards relinquished". The extract continues "the village is pleasantly situated on the river Nore, and on the road from Dublin to Limerick, it contains 59 houses, many of which are good residences, and the whole has an appearance of neatness and respectability".

== Places of interest ==
Gash Gardens and the De La Salle Brothers monastery which has been in the village since 1881.

== Community ==
Castletown is known as "The Tidiest Village in Laois". Chairman of the Tidy Towns committee is Seán Fleming, TD. In 1998, Castletown were just four points behind the national winner. The village won the overall Irish Tidy Towns Competition in 2002.

== Education ==
There are three national schools in the parish: Castletown Primary School, Paddock National School and Rushall National School. The nearest secondary school is Mountrath Community School.

== Sport ==
Castletown has a Gaelic Athletic Association (GAA) club called Castletown GAA, while another club in the parish is called Slieve Bloom GAA. There is also a camogie club called Naomh Éamann Camogie Club.

== Transport ==
A road bridge, built in 1972, relieved some of the traffic congestion in the village. The village is served by Bus Éireann Expressway route 12 linking it to Dublin, Dublin Airport, Portlaoise, and Limerick.

Mountrath and Castletown railway station opened on 1 September 1848, closed for goods traffic on 3 November 1975 and finally closed altogether on 6 September 1976. Nowadays the nearest train stations are Portlaoise railway station and Ballybrophy railway station.

== See also ==
- List of towns and villages in Ireland
