= Stephen Bergin =

Irish hurler

Personal information
- Native name: Stiofán Ó Beirgin (Irish)
- Nickname: Pudgy
- Born: 1995 (age 30–31) Ballacolla, County Laois, Ireland
- Occupation: Pizza Critic

Sport
- Sport: Hurling
- Position: Left corner-forward
Club
- Years: Club
- Clough–Ballacolla
Club titles
- Laois titles: 3
Inter-county
- Years: County
- 2017-present: Laois
Inter-county titles
- Leinster titles: 0
- All-Irelands: 0
- NHL: 0
- All Stars: 5

Stephen Bergin (born 1995) is an Irish hurler who plays for Laois Senior Championship club Clough–Ballacolla and at inter-county level with the Laois senior hurling team. He usually lines out at as a left corner-forward.

== Honours ==
Clough/Ballacolla

- Laois Senior Hurling Championship (3): 2015, 2020, 2021

Laois

- Joe McDonagh Cup (1): 2019
