= Cathal Óg Greene =

Irish Gaelic footballer

Personal information
- Native name: Cathal Óg Ó hUaine (Irish)
- Nickname: Ogie
- Born: 1987 (age 38–39) County Laois, Ireland
- Height: 1.91 m (6 ft 3 in)

Sport
- Sport: Gaelic football
- Position: Midfield
Club
- Years: Club
- Park–Ratheniska
Club titles
- London titles: 1 JFC, 1 JHC
- Leinster titles: 1 JFC, 1 Leinster SJHC
Inter-county
- Years: County
- 2010-: Laois

Cathal Óg Greene (born 1987) is a Gaelic footballer for London. He plays his club football and hurling with St Kiernan's.

He is originally from Laois and in 2003 was part of the Laois panel that won the All-Ireland Minor Football Championship title for the first time since 1997.

He was on the panel again in 2004 when Laois won the Leinster Minor Football Championship. In 2005 Cathal Óg started midfield on the Laois minor team which won the Leinster Minor Football Championship.

In 2006 and 2007, Cathal Óg was part of the Laois panel that won the Leinster U21 Football Championship and in 2008 he was midfield on the side which again won the Leinster U21 Football Championship only to go on to lose to Cork in the All-Ireland Under 21 Football Championship Final to a last minute goal.

At club level, Cathal Óg lined out as a midfielder with Park–Ratheniska with whom he has won a Laois Junior Football Championship and a Leinster Junior Club Football Championship in 2006. Cathal Óg also holds Laois Minor Football Championship and Leinster Minor Football Championship medals as well as a number of Schools titles won with Portlaoise CBS.

Cathal Óg made his National Football League debut for Laois in 2010 against Tipperary.
