= 1995 Laois Senior Hurling Championship =

Annual hurling competition season

- Sponsor: Downey Auto Stop
- Champions: Castletown (1st title); John O'Sullivan (captain)
- Runners-up: Portlaoise

The 1995 Laois Senior Hurling Championship was the 102nd staging of the Laois Senior Hurling Championship since its establishment by the Laois County Board in 1888.

Camross were the defending champions, however, they were beaten by Castletown in the semi-finals.

The final was played on 10 September 1995 at O'Moore Park in Portlaoise, between Castletown and Portlaoise, in what was their first ever meeting in the final. Castletown won the match by 1–12 to 0–11 to claim their first ever championship title.

== Results ==
=== Semi-finals ===
20 August 1995 Semi-final	Castletown	2-14 - 0-09	Camross	O'Moore Park

20 August 1995 Semi-final	Portlaoise	2-12 - 1-05	The Harps	O'Moore Park

=== Final ===
10 September 1995 Final	Castletown	1-12 - 0-11	Portlaoise	O'Moore Park
