= Trumera GAA =

GAA club in County Laois, Ireland

Trumera
- Tromaire
- Founded: 1969
- County: Laois
- Nickname: Blood and Bandage
- Colours: White and Red
- Grounds: Trumera Gaa
- Coordinates: 52°58′34.89″N 7°25′47.31″W

Playing kits
Standard colours

Trumera GAA is a hurling and Gaelic football club in County Laois, Ireland.

== History ==
The present Trumera GAA Club was formed at a meeting in Trumera National School in winter 1968.

An earlier version of Trumera was set up at a gathering of interested people in the 1920s. The team reached a county Junior semi-final against Mountmellick in 1927. They lost that game and the team faded out soon afterwards.

All through the seventies and eighties the club competed in the Laois Junior Hurling Championship without any great success. The nineties brought a change of fortune with the club reaching its first league final in 1990.

Since then, the club has won Junior C, Junior B, Junior A, and in 2004 the Laois Intermediate Hurling Championship and also reached the Leinster Junior Club Hurling Championship final narrowly losing out to Galmoy. The club competed in the Laois Senior Hurling Championship for 2 years 2005-2006 and had some good results before losing out to Clonad in the relegation final of 2006. Also in 2013 they reached the Intermediate final where they lost to Shanahoe. In 2015 Trumera played in the Laois Intermediate Hurling Championship Final against Clonad where they came out as Winners.

In 2016 they have been relegated from the Laois Senior B Championship but have won the Laois Intermediate Hurling championship in 2017 where they were victorious against Rathdowney/Erill.

In 2004 Trumera won the Laois Junior C Football Championship and also reached the Division 5 ACFL Final.

The former President of the GAA, Liam O'Neill is a member of the Trumera club.

In 2021, Trumera saw themselves win their third intermediate hurling championship final in 6 years, with an awful lot of youth making up the team such as The youngest member on the team Finnian O’Connor who started off the scoring on the night with a long range free from inside his own 21 yard line, freetaker Adam Kirwan, goaltret Paddy Hosey, Bryan Bredin, Gearoid O’Neill, Dylan Lalor, Connor Madden, Rhys Murphy and Captain on the day Caolan Murphy. Trumera weren’t short of experience that day with the likes of John O’Connor, Paddy Callaghan and Cathal Brophy all making the starting line-up with the great Joey Coogan making his appearance as the only sub used on the day and getting a critical score that came off one of many great puckouts by goalkeeper Finnian O’Connor. Not forgetting man of the match Niall Sinnott who came up with some incredible frees in the dying embers of the game and also James Kerwin and Donnacha Dowling also in the team on the day. Trumera were crowned county champions on the fine Friday night and what turned out to be a weekend to remember for all within the small club. Trumera Abú.

== Achievements ==
- Laois intermediate hurling championship runner up 2023
- Leinster Junior Club Hurling Championship: Runner-Up 2004
- Laois Intermediate Hurling Championship Winners 2004, 2015, 2017, 2021
- Laois Junior Hurling Championship Winners 1997
- Laois Junior C Football Championship (1) 2004

== Notable players ==
- Liam O'Neill
