= Zane Keenan =

Irish hurler (born 1988)

Personal information
- Native name: Zane Ó Cuinneacháin (Irish)
- Born: 12 December 1988 (age 37) Portlaoise, Ireland

Sport
- Sport: Hurling
- Position: Centre forward
Club
- Years: Club
- 2005-: Camross
Club titles
- Laois titles: 4
Inter-county
Years	County	Apps (scores)
2006-present	Laois	16 (2-69)

Zane Keenan (born 12 December 1988 in Portlaoise, County Laois, Ireland) is a hurling player from Co Laois.

== Personal life ==
Zane, son of Frank and Theresa, is the youngest of four boys and three girls. His older brothers Barry, Damien, and Fran also played for Camross' senior team and won the Laois Senior Championship in 2007 together.

He went to Killanure, N.S., where he won three national school titles in 1999, 2000, and 2001. He went on to St. Aengus Post Primary School, where he was educated from September 2001 to May 2004.

== Laois career ==
An effective full-forward, Keenan has played with Laois at all levels. He first joined the senior panel in 2006, where he made his début against Offaly in O'Moore Park and scored a point. In 2008, after a disagreement with manager Damien Fox, he was dismissed from the panel. He returned in 2009, but after picking up a leg injury in an NHL league game with Kerry, he was ruled out for the year and didn't return to the panel till 2013. Keenan's return had been a good one; he won a Division 2A medal against Westmeath, and he also scored in all four games against Antrim, Carlow, Galway, and Clare.

== Camross career ==
He has had success at club level also. In 2005, at the age of 16, he played for Camross in the Laois Senior Hurling Championship final but lost out in a replay to Castletown. In September 2006, Camross and Castletown played each other in the Laois Senior Hurling Championship, where there was an off - the - field brawl. Camross won the game, by a score line of 2–11 to 0–10. A week after the game both clubs were thrown out of the following championship for 2007 by Laois County Board. Both clubs appealed the decision; after months of working together, they were allowed back into the championship. But Keenan felt that Laois County Board and some local media had made a personal attack on Camross and him, so he made the decision not to part take with Laois. In 2007 Keenan played in Laois County Final, where he scored 3–3 against Portlaoise. He ended the year as top scorer and Hurler of the year in Laois Senior Championship.

His father Frank Keenan is a former player with Laois and manager of Carlow.
