= John Lennon (hurler) =

Irish hurler

Personal information
- Native name: Seán Ó Leannáin (Irish)
- Born: 1996 (age 29–30) Rosenallis, County Laois, Ireland
- Occupation: Mechanical engineer

Sport
- Sport: Hurling
- Position: Midfield
Club
- Years: Club
- Rosenallis
Club titles
- Laois titles: 0
College
- Years: College
- University of Limerick
College titles
- Fitzgibbon titles: 1
Inter-county
- Years: County
- 2016-present: Laois
Inter-county titles
- Leinster titles: 0
- All-Irelands: 0
- NHL: 0
- All Stars: 0

John Lennon (born 1996) is an Irish hurler who plays for Laois Senior Championship club Rosenallis and at inter-county level with the Laois senior hurling team. He usually lines out at midfield.

== Honours ==
University of Limerick

- Fitzgibbon Cup (1): 2018

Rosenallis

- Laois Intermediate Hurling Championship (1): 2016

Laois

- Joe McDonagh Cup (1): 2019
