= Paddy Dunne (Gaelic footballer) =

Irish Gaelic footballer

Personal information
- Native name: Pádraig Ó Duinn (Irish)
- Nickname: The Tull
- Born: 10 March 1929 County Laois, Ireland
- Died: 18 April 2013 (aged 84)
- Height: 6 ft (183 cm) 1

Sport
- Sport: Gaelic football
- Position: -Centre half back
Club
Years	Club	Apps (scores)
? -?	Park–Ratheniska	?
Club titles
- Laois titles: 2
- Leinster titles: 1
Inter-county
Years	County	Apps (scores)
10	Laois	?
Inter-county titles
- Leinster titles: ?

Paddy Dunne was a Gaelic football player from Park in County Laois.

He played for many years on the Laois senior football team in the centre half back position and was widely regarded as one of the outstanding players in Ireland of the 1950s.

With his club Park, he was captain as they won two Laois Senior Football Championship titles in 1952 and 1953.

Called up the Laois team in 1949 following outstanding performances for his club Park, Paddy was centre back on the Laois team who were narrowly beaten by Meath in the 1951 Leinster Football Final. He would still be there in his famous no 6 jersey when Laois suffered another agonising defeat in the 1959 Leinster Football Final.

He also played for his province Leinster, winning three consecutive Railway Cup medals in 1952, 1953 and 1954, all on the field of play. Only one other Laois player, Colm Browne, has managed to emulate this feat.

Dunne played for the Rest Of Ireland XV in 1953 and 1954. He retired from all football following the 59 Leinster final due to a recurring back problem.

Dunne was selected at centre half back on the Laois team of the millennium which was selected 1999.

In 2008 Dunne was selected to be inducted into the Laois GAA Hall of Fame.
