= Shanahoe =

Village in County Laois, Ireland

Shanahoe Seanchua
- Village
- Location in Ireland
- Coordinates: 52°56′N 7°25′W
- Country: Ireland
- Province: Leinster
- County: County Laois

Shanahoe (Irish: Seanchua) is a small village in County Laois, Ireland, situated in the centre of the county, 8 km west of Abbeyleix and 7 km south of Mountrath.

== History and development ==
Evidence of ancient settlement in the area includes a Bronze Age urn which was discovered nearby in the 1930s. The remains of a ringfort are also recorded in Shanahoe townland.

Built mainly along the two main approach roads, the village developed as a predominantly linear settlement. Buildings at the village centre include the village church, community hall and national (primary) school. The M7/M8 Motorway Scheme lies to the west of the village.

== Education ==
Scoil Fionntáin Naofa, the local national (primary) school, was built in 1948. As of 2010, there were 74 pupils enrolled in the school.

== Sport ==
The local Gaelic Athletic Association club is Shanahoe GAA, whose pitches are located about 2 km outside the village.

== Notable people ==
- John Keegan (1816–1849), writer, poet and storyteller, was born in Killeaney near the village of Shanahoe.

== See also ==
- List of towns and villages in Ireland
