= 2003 Laois Senior Hurling Championship =

Annual hurling competition season

- Champions: Castletown (7th title); David Cuddy (captain); Richie Power (manager)
- Runners-up: Portlaoise; Des Killeen (captain); John Taylor (manager)

The 2003 Laois Senior Hurling Championship was the 110th staging of the Laois Senior Hurling Championship since its establishment by the Laois County Board in 1888.

Castletown were the defending champions.

The final was played on 5 October 2003 at O'Moore Park in Portlaoise, between Castletown and Portlaoise, in what was their third meeting in the final overall. Castletown won the match by 2–12 to 1–11 to claim their seventh championship title overall and a fifth consecutive title.

== Results ==
=== Quarter-finals ===
| 6 September 2003 Quarter-final | Camross | 1-10 - 1-11 | Tinnahinch | Durrow Grounds |

| 7 September 2003 Quarter-final | Clonad | 0-11 - 4-17 | Castletown | O'Moore Park |

=== Semi-finals ===
| 13 September 2003 Semi-final | Portlaoise | 2-10 - 2-08 | Tinnahinch | O'Moore Park |

| 21 September 2003 Semi-final | Ballinakill Gaels | 1-13 - 2-14 | Castletown | O'Moore Park |

=== Final ===
| 5 October 2003 Final | Castletown | 2-12 - 1-11 | Portlaoise | O'Moore Park |
