= Tommy Fitzgerald (hurler) =

Irish hurler and manager

Personal information
- Native name: Tomás Mac Gearailt (Irish)
- Born: 1983 (age 42–43) Portlaoise, County Laois, Ireland
- Height: 5 ft 11 in (180 cm)

Sport
- Sport: Hurling
- Position: Wing-forward
Club
- Years: Club
- Portlaoise
Club titles
	Football	Hurling
Laois titles	9	1
Leinster titles	2	0
Inter-county
Years	County	Apps (scores)
2002–2015	Laois	50
Inter-county titles
- Leinster titles: 0
- All-Irelands: 0
- NHL: 0
- All Stars: 0

Thomas Fitzgerald (born 1983) is an Irish hurling manager and former player. He has been manager of the Laois senior team since 2024. He was a dual player at club level with Portlaoise and was also a member of the Laois senior team at inter-county level.

== Playing career ==
Fitzgerald began his club career with Portlaoise as a dual player at underage levels. He won minor and under-21 championship titles in both hurling and Gaelic football before progressing to the club's respective senior teams as a dual player. Fitzgerald won nine Laois SFC medals and one Laois SHC medal between 2002 and 2013. He also won two Leinster Club SFC medals.

On the inter-county scene, Fitzgerald first played hurling for Laois during a two-year tenure with the minor team in 2000 and 2001. He later lined out with the under-21 team. Fitzgerald made his senior team debut in 2002. He won a National League Division 2 medal that year before later claiming an All-Ireland SBHC medal after a 2–20 to 2–7 defeat of Wicklow in the final.

Fitzgerald won a second Division 2 medal in 2007 before leaving the panel in March 2011 following a disagreement with team manager Brendan Fennelly. He returned to the panel shortly after and claimed a third Division 2 medal in 2013. Fitzgerald retired from inter-county hurling 2015.

== Managerial career ==
Fitzgerald was part of Eddie Brennan's management team when Brennan guided Laois to the Joe McDonagh Cup title in 2019. Fitzgerald later switched to club coaching with St Thomas' in Galway. After coaching the club to three successive Galway SHC titles, Fitzgerald's side claimed the All-Ireland Club SHC title in 2024 after an 0–18 to 0–17 defeat of O'Loughlin Gaels.

Fitzgerald succeeded Darren Gleeson as the Laois senior team manager in November 2024.

== Honours ==
=== Player ===
Portlaoise

- Leinster Senior Club Football Championship: 2004, 2009
- Laois Senior Football Championship: 2002, 2004, 2007, 2008, 2009, 2010, 2011, 2012, 2013
- Laois Senior Hurling Championship: 2004
- Laois Under-21 A Hurling Championship: 2000
- Laois Under-21 A Football Championship: 2001, 2002
- Laois Minor A Football Championship: 1999
- Laois Minor A Hurling Championship: 1999, 2001

Laois

- All-Ireland Senior B Hurling Championship: 2002
- National Hurling League Division 2: 2002, 2007, 2013

=== Management ===
St Thomas'

- All-Ireland Senior Club Hurling Championship: 2024
- Galway Senior Hurling Championship: 2021, 2022, 2023

Laois

- Joe McDonagh Cup: 2019

Sporting positions
Preceded by Darren Gleeson	Laois Senior Hurling Manager; 2024–	Succeeded by Incumbent
