= Slieve Bloom GAA =

GAA club in County Laois, Ireland

- Sliabh Bladhma
- Founded: 1947
- County: Laois
- Colours: Orange and white
- Grounds: Deerpark
- Coordinates: 53°01′57.27″N 7°30′03.27″W

Playing kits
Standard colours

Slieve Bloom GAA is a Gaelic Athletic Association hurling club in County Laois, Ireland.

== Overview ==
The club was founded in 1947 and the club colours are orange and white.

The club grounds are located two miles (3.2 km) from Mountrath off the mountain road to Clonaslee. The townland that the field is located in is called Deerpark and the grounds were once part of the Deerpark estate. The club obtained the grounds from the land commission when the estate was divided. Previous to that the club had operated from the sportsfield at Clonin, Mountrath and also from Rushin, Mountrath.

In later years the grounds were improved, the playing pitch was leveled and a perimeter fence was erected.

In 1947 Slieve Bloom won the Laois Junior Hurling Championship but had to wait until 1983 to repeat that success. The Captain of the team in 1983 was Thomas Cuddy as the Slieve Bloom men beat Ballypickas in the final.

Their only other championship title came in 1999 when they won Laois Junior B Hurling Championship title following a 2–4 to 0–7 win over neighbours Castletown.

Slieve Bloom also won the Laois All-County Hurling League Division 4 title in 1999 with a repeat win over Castletown and added the Laois All-County Hurling League Division 3 title in 2002.

In 2009 a new Gaelic football club was formed between members of both Slieve Bloom and Castletown. This new entity was a short lived union.

In early 2015 the decision was made to part ways with the senior amalgamation and Slieve Bloom entered a team in the Junior A championship and Division 3 league. James Young from Clonaslee was appointed as the team trainer, his first such role.

On 9 October 2016, Slieve Bloom won their first Junior A championship in 33 years beating Rathdowney-Errill in the final by 2–24 to 2–6, an 18 points win. Slieve Bloom's Laois senior hurler Ben Conroy scored 1–15.

== Achievements ==
- Laois Intermediate Hurling Championship (2): 2018, 2026
- Laois Junior Hurling Championship (3): 1947, 1983, 2016
- Laois Junior B Hurling Championship (1): 1999
- Laois Junior B Football Championship (1): 2021
- Laois Junior C Football Championship (1): 2018
