= Laois Premier Intermediate Hurling Championship =

Annual hurling competition for intermediate clubs in Laois

- Current season or competition: 2026 Laois Premier Intermediate Hurling Championship
- Irish: Craobh Príomh-Idirmheánach Iomáint Laoise
- Code: Hurling
- Founded: 2020; 6 years ago
- Region: Laois (GAA)
- Trophy: Dick Palmer Cup
- No. of teams: 8
- Title holders: Castletown (1st title)
- Sponsors: Laois Shopping Centre
- Official website: Laois gaa

The Laois Premier Intermediate Hurling Championship (known for sponsorship reasons as the Laois Shopping Centre Premier Intermediate Hurling Championship and abbreviated to the Laois PIHC) is an annual hurling competition organised by the Laois County Board of the Gaelic Athletic Association from 2020 for the second tier hurling teams in the county of Laois in Ireland.

In its current format, the Laois Premier Intermediate Championship begins with a group stage in mid-summer. The eight participating teams are divided into two groups of four and play each other in a round-robin system. The three top-ranking teams in each group proceed to the knockout phase that culminates with the final match at Laois Hire O'Moore Park. The winner of the Laois Premier Intermediate Championship qualifies for the subsequent Leinster Intermediate Club Hurling Championship.

The title has been won by seven different clubs, none of which have won the title more than once. Castletown are the title holders after defeating Camross by 2–23 to 1–22 in the 2026 final.

== History ==
A second tier senior hurling competition had existed in various formats since 1995. It was originally played as the Dick Palmer Cup, with clubs qualifying for the competition by not reaching a certain stage of the Laois Senior Championship. Since 2010, the Laois Senior A Championship operated as a stand-alone competition, with promotion and relegation to the various championships. A review of Laois's hurling structures in 2019 resulted in the Laois Senior A Championship being renamed the Laois Premier Intermediate Championship.

== Format ==
=== Group stage ===
The eight teams are divided into two groups of four. Over the course of the group stage each team plays once against the others in the group, resulting in each team being guaranteed at least three games. Two points are awarded for a win, one for a draw and zero for a loss. The teams are ranked in the group stage table by points gained, then scoring difference and then their head-to-head record. The top two teams in each group qualify for the knock-out stage.

=== Knockout stage ===
Following the completion of the group stage, the top three teams from each group advance to the knockout stage. The two top-ranking teams receive byes to separate semi-finals.

- Quarter-finals: The second and third-ranked teams in each group contest this round. The two winners from these two games advance to the semi-finals.
- Semi-finals: The two quarter-final winners and the top-ranked teams contest this round. The two winners from these two games advance to the final.
- Final: The two semi-final winners contest the final. The winning team are declared champions.

=== Promotion and relegation ===
At the end of the championship, the winning team is automatically promoted to the Laois Senior Championship for the following season. The two bottom-placed teams from the group stage take part in a playoff, with the losing team being relegated to the Laois Intermediate Championship.

== Teams ==
=== 2026 teams ===
The 8 teams competing in the 2026 Laois Premier Intermediate Hurling Championship are:

Club	Location	In championship since	Championship titles	Last championship title
Camross	Coolrain	2020	0	—
Castletown	Castletown	2026	1	2026
Clonad	Ballycarnan	2026	0	—
Clonaslee–St Manman's	Clonaslee	1997	0	—
Clough–Ballacolla	Clough and Ballacolla	2023	0	—
Colt–Shanahoe	Raheen	2024	0	—
Mountmellick	Mountmellick	2025	0	—
Rathdowney–Errill	Rathdowney and Errill	2021	0	—

== Sponsorship ==
Laois Shopping Centre became the first title sponsor of the championship in 2020.

== Qualification for subsequent competitions ==
At the end of the championship, the winning team qualify to the subsequent Leinster Intermediate Club Hurling Championship. Portlaoise in 2018 are the only team to have reached the Leinster final, however, they were beaten by Graigue-Ballycallan.

== List of finals ==
=== List of Laois PIHC finals ===
Year	Winners		Runners-up		Venue	#
Year	Club	Score	Club	Score	Venue	#
2026	Castletown	2-23	Camross	1-22	Laois Hire O'Moore Park	
2025	Ballyfin	3-14	Rathdowney–Errill	1-11	Laois Hire O'Moore Park	
2024	Borris-in-Ossory–Kilcotton	2-16	Ballinakill	0-19	Laois Hire O'Moore Park	note: both teams promoted due to Championship restructure
2023	Portlaoise	0-19	Ballyfin	0-10	Laois Hire O'Moore Park	
2022	Abbeyleix St Lazarian's	1-24	Clonaslee	0-13	MW Hire O'Moore Park	
2021	Ballinakill	2-14	Ballyfin	1-14	MW Hire O'Moore Park	
2020	The Harps	1-18	Portlaoise	2-12	MW Hire O'Moore Park	

== Roll of honour ==
=== By club ===
#	Club	Titles	Runners-up	Championships won	Championships runner-up
1	Ballyfin	1	2	2025	2021, 2023
1	Portlaoise	1	1	2023	2020
1	Ballinakill	1	1	2021	2024
1	The Harps	1	0	2020	—
1	Abbeyleix St Lazarian's	1	0	2022	—
1	Borris-in-Ossory–Kilcotton	1	0	2024	—
1	Castletown	1	0	2026	—
8	Clonaslee	0	1	—	2022
8	Rathdowney–Errill	0	1	—	2025
8	Camross	0	1	—	2026

== Laois Senior A Hurling Championship ==
This competition has existed in various guises since 1995. It was originally played as the Dick Palmer Cup up to 2009, then became a competition ancillary to the main championship. In the earlier years, clubs would qualify for the Senior B by not reaching a certain stage of the main competition.

Since 2010, it has been a proper Tier2 competition, with promotion/relegation to/from the Senior Hurling Championship and from 2015, it has been called the Senior A Hurling Championship.

In 2020 it was replaced by the Premier Intermediate Hurling Championship.

Laois Senior A Hurling Championship
- Irish: Craobh Sinsir Iomáint Laoise
- Title holders: Rosenallis(2019)
- Sponsors: Laois Shopping Centre

Year	Winner	Score	Opponent	Score
2012	Clough–Ballacolla	0-16	Camross	2-05
2013	Abbeyleix	4-12	Ballyfin	0-09
2014	Ballinakill	0-22	St Fintan's, Mountrath	1-12
2015	Portlaoise	1-14	Clonaslee	1-11
2016	Castletown	1–11	Ballyfin Gaels	0–13
2017	Ballyfin Gaels	0–15	Colt	0–12
2018	Portlaoise	1-13	The Harps	1-11
2019	Rosenallis	1-12	The Harps	1-11

== See also ==
- Laois Senior Hurling Championship
- Laois Premier Intermediate Hurling Championship
- Laois Intermediate Hurling Championship
- Laois Junior A Hurling Championship
- Laois Junior B Hurling Championship
- Laois Junior C Hurling Championship
