= Paudie Butler =

Irish hurler and Gaelic footballer

Personal information
- Native name: Pádraig de Buitléir (Irish)
- Born: 1950 (age 75–76) Bouladuff, Thurles, County Tipperary, Ireland

Sport
Club
- Years: Club
- Drom & Inch
Inter-county
- Years: County
- 1977-1981: Tipperary
Inter-county titles
	Football	Hurling
Munster Titles	0	0
All-Ireland Titles	0	0
League titles	0	0
All-Stars	0	0

Paudie Butler (born 1950) is a retired former GAA hurling coach and team manager, and former hurler and Gaelic footballer who was a dual player for the Tipperary senior teams in the late 1970s and early 1980s.

Butler joined the senior football team during the 1977 championship and was a regular member of the team for just three seasons. During that time he also lined out with the senior hurling team.

At club level Butler played for the Drom & Inch club.

In retirement from playing Butler became involved in coaching. He was manager of the successful Tipperary minor hurling team that won the All-Ireland hurling championship in 1996. He also was coach/selector for the Tipperary U21 team in 2002, and managed the Laois senior hurling team for 3 years.

He is best known for his role working with the GAA as National Director of Hurling.

Paudie has managed several club teams over the years and was manager of the Newport GAA club senior hurling team when they won their first North Tipperary Hurling Championship in 1996, bridging a 61-year gap.

Sporting positions
Preceded by Dinny Cahill	Tipperary Minor Hurling Manager; 1998-2000	Succeeded by Paddy McCormack
Preceded by Pat Delaney	Laois Senior Hurling Manager; 2002-2005	Succeeded by Dinny Cahill
