= Park–Ratheniska GAA =

GAA club in Ratheniska, County Laois, Ireland

Park–Ratheniska
- Páirc/Raithín an Uisce
- Founded: 1981
- County: Laois
- Colours: Green and gold
- Grounds: Ratheniska
- Coordinates: 53°00′24.91″N 7°13′02.89″W

Playing kits
Standard colours

Senior Club Championships
	All Ireland	Leinster champions	Laois champions
Football:	-	1 (JFC)	2
Hurling:	-	1 (JHC)	-

Park–Ratheniska GAA is a Gaelic Athletic Association gaelic football and hurling club in County Laois, Ireland.

The club was founded in 1981 after the amalgamation of Park Football Club and Ratheniska Hurling Club. The club's colours are green and gold. The club has competed at senior level in both hurling and Gaelic football and has a juvenile section, catering for both boys and girls in hurling and football from U6 up to U21.

== History ==
=== Origins ===
Gaelic Athletic Association has always played a role in Park–Ratheniska, dating back to a Ratheniska team in 1913, where the first signs of Gaelic football in the area can be traced. This team faded away after contesting a few finals in that era, and it wasn't until the Loughteague team in 1927 and 1928 that football began to flourish in the area when the newly formed club won two Laois Junior Football Championships.

=== Foundation of Park Football Club ===
The first appearance of what was to become the Park–Ratheniska GAA club came in 1933 when the Park Football Club was founded when a Minor and Junior team were affiliated with the Laois GAA County Board. A Minor title was won in the club's first year. A breakthrough for the club came in 1942 though, when they broke out of Junior ranks for the first time. Four years of Intermediate football was rewarded in 1947 when the Laois Intermediate Football Championship title came their way, and at last Senior Football was achieved.

=== Mid 20th-century ===
The club became a force to be reckoned within senior ranks in the 1950s. In 1952, a Park team trained by Will "Bruno" McEvoy and under the captaincy of Paddy Dunne, stormed all in front of them, culminating in a final victory against a fancied Ballyroan side. The club retained the title in 1953.

The club's next title of note was in 1972 when they captured the Laois Junior B Football Championship. Local rivalry was to the fore for the club's next success when in 1977 they captured the league Division 2 final defeating neighbours Stradbally.

=== Ratheniska Hurling Club ===
It was during this period of success for Park Football Club that another club was coming to prominence in the area. The Ratheniska Hurling Club had been founded in 1953, running alongside the Park Football Club, while primarily using many of the same players as the footballers. The club took its first ever-hurling title in 1958 when it clinched the Laois Junior Hurling Championship title. Success agreed with the club early on, and a defeat in the Laois Intermediate Hurling Championship final of 1960 was followed up quickly with a win in the very same in 1961. However, following ten years at senior level the move was taken to return to junior ranks where success came quickly again in the form of the 1971 Laois Junior Hurling Championship title. A Laois Intermediate Hurling Championship title followed in 1977 as the club again ascended through the ranks.

=== Merger to form Park–Ratheniska GAA club ===
In 1981, both clubs decided to amalgamate. Park G.F.C and Ratheniska Hurling Club were combined under one name, the Park–Ratheniska GAA Club. The new club had to wait six years for its name to be carved on a trophy, but this came along in 1987 when the Junior hurlers completed a League and Championship double. The footballers were promoted back to Senior ranks in 1988 after winning the Laois Intermediate Football Championship final in O'Moore Park.

=== 1990s ===
1994 was to prove one of the most trophy laden years in the club's history. The Laois All-County Football League Division 2 trophy was collected first, and was then followed up by the hurlers doing the league and championship double as they marched back to senior ranks again.

Another chapter in the club's history was written in 2003 when the junior hurlers picked up the Championship trophy in O'Moore Park.

=== 2006 provincial championship ===
In 2006, the club's Junior A footballers won the Laois Junior Football Championship in O Moore Park after Barrowhouse had been defeated on a scoreline of 1–13 to 0–08. They then defeated St Ultans of Meath by 2–8 to 1–8 in the Leinster Junior Club Football Championship Final, with a last minute goal from Johnny Nevin. Captain Cathal Óg Greene accepted the trophy from Leinster Council chairman Liam O'Neill.

=== 2007 and 2008, beaten finalists ===
2007 was the football club's first year back in the IFC ranks and saw the intermediate footballers just lose out on a semi-final place on score difference. The Junior hurlers had more success though and they reached the JHC final against Clough/Ballacolla. However success was not to be, as the club lost their third JHC final in four years.

In 2008, the footballers reached Laois IFC final after an unbeaten run. However, a Michael Tierney inspired Ballyroan Abbey proved too strong in the decider and Park–Ratheniska were left playing Intermediate Football for another year.

The Junior footballers gained promotion from Division 5 of the league also in 2008, with silverware eluding them as they were defeated in the ACFL 5 final.

=== 2011, provincial champions again ===
In 2011, the club's Junior hurlers reached the summit in Laois with a county final win over Borris-in-Ossory/Kilcotton in O'Moore Park, Portlaoise. In a one sided game, the Park–Ratheniska men beat their opponents on a 2–14 to 0–3 scoreline, with Brendan Fingleton putting in a man of the match winning performance from midfield, while at the same time assuring himself of 2011 Laois Junior Hurler of the Year.

They then went on a run through Leinster with wins over the Louth and Kildare representatives, before culminating in a provincial final on a winter afternoon in Ratheniska GAA Grounds. This time it was Parnells of Dublin who stood in the way of the Leinster Junior Club Hurling Championship title, and goals from Darragh Nolan and Barry Fingleton secured a 2–10 to 1–08 win, giving Park/Ratheniska the honour of becoming the first Laois Club to hold provincial titles in both hurling and football.

== Achievements ==
- Leinster Junior Club Football Championship: (1) 2006
- Leinster Special Junior Club Hurling Championship: (1) 2011
- Laois Junior Football Championships: 2006 & 2020
- Laois Junior Hurling Championship: 2011
- Laois Junior B Hurling Championship: (1) 1987
- Laois Intermediate Football Championship (2) 1988 & 2021
- Laois Intermediate Hurling Championship (1) 1994
- Laois All-County Football League Div. 2: (1) 1994

== Notable players ==
- Paddy Dunne
- Sean Delaney
- Martin Wall
- Cathal Óg Greene
