= Dinny Cahill =

Irish hurling manager and former player

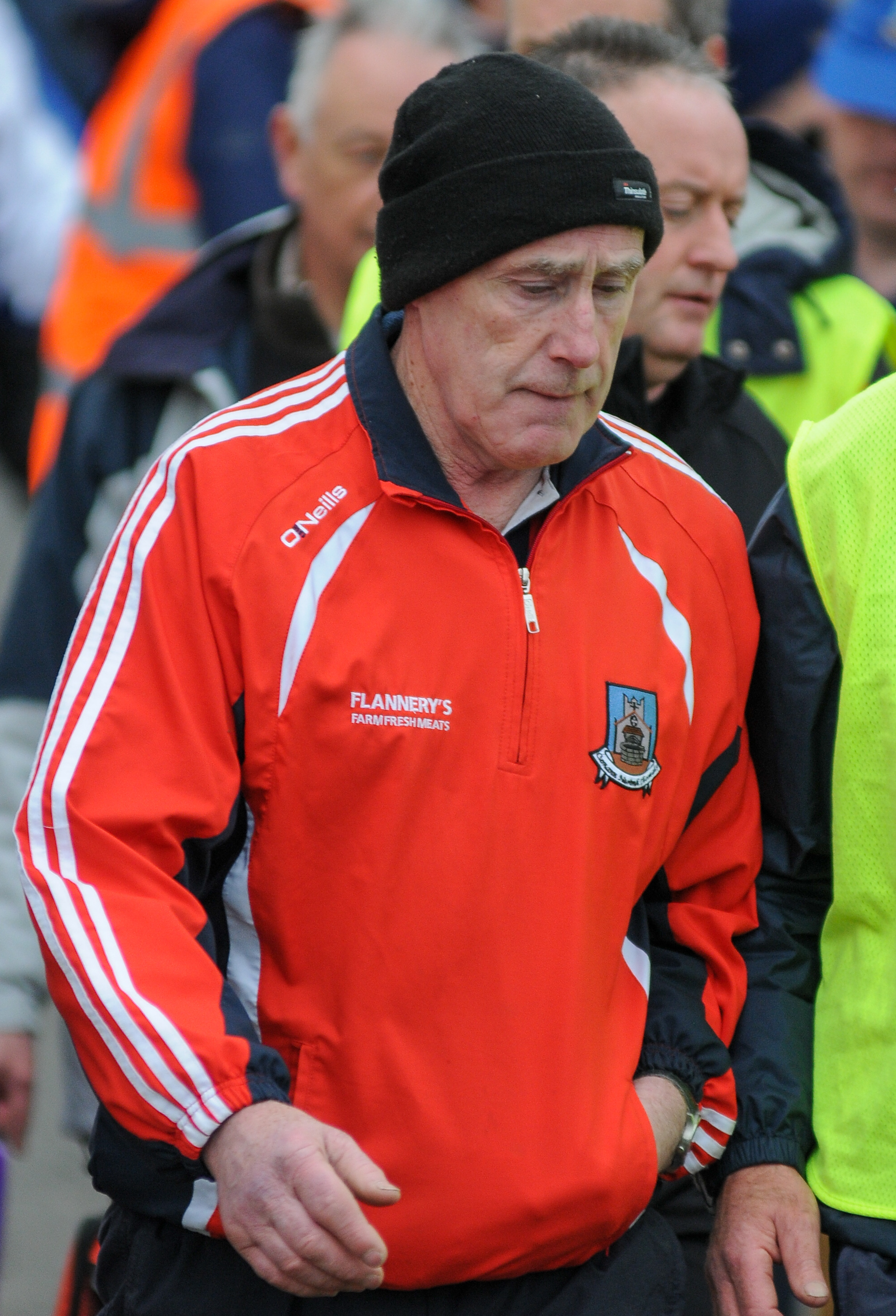
- Cahill in 2015

Personal information
- Native name: Donncha Mac Cathail (Irish)
- Born: 29 December 1954 (age 71) Cloughjordan, County Tipperary, Ireland
- Occupation: Carpenter

Sport
- Sport: Hurling and Gaelic football
- Position: Left corner-back
Club
- Years: Club
- 1970–1994: Kilruane MacDonagh's
Club titles
- Tipperary titles: 4
- Munster titles: 1
- All-Ireland Titles: 1
Inter-county
Years	County	Apps (scores)
1980–1984	Tipperary	7 (0–1)
Inter-county titles
- Munster titles: 0
- All-Irelands: 0
- NHL: 0
- All Stars: 0

Dinny Cahill (born 29 December 1954) is an Irish hurling manager and former player. He is the former manager of the Antrim senior hurling team.

Cahill enjoyed a successful playing career at club level with Kilruane MacDonagh's while his career at inter-county level with Tipperary came during an uncharacteristic famine. He was a midfielder on the former team during a hugely successful period for the club in the 1970s and 1980s, the highlight of which was the winning of an All-Ireland club medal in 1986.

Immediately after retiring from inter-county activity Cahill became involved in team management. He has taken charge of club and inter-county teams all over the country, including Portumna in Galway, Doon in Limerick, Graigue-Ballycallan in Kilkenny, as well as the Laois senior inter-county team. Cahill was appointed manager of the Antrim senior hurling team for a second term in November 2009.

== Playing career ==
=== Club ===
Cahill played his club hurling with the Kilruane MacDonagh's club. After some success in the minor and under-21 grades he subsequently became a key member of the club's successful senior team throughout the 1980s.

In 1977 Kilruane MacDonagh's qualified for the final of the county senior championship with Borris-Ileigh providing the opposition. That game ended in a draw and it looked as if Cahill's side had lost their chance of victory. The subsequent replay was a low-scoring and dour affair, but Kilruane took the title by a goal and Cahill secured his first county title.

1978 saw Kilruane MacDonagh's qualify for a second successive county championship decider. Roscrea provided the opposition on that occasion and a close game developed over the hour. At the long whistle Kilruane MacDonagh's were the champions by 2–14 to 2–13 and Cahill picked up a second consecutive county title.

Kilruane MacDonagh's had the chance to make it three-in-a-row in 1979. Club kingpins Thurles Sarsfield's were the opponents, but Cahill's side powered to a 2–18 to 3–9 victory. It was his third county championship title.

With the treble taken care of thoughts turned to securing a remarkable fourth successive county title. Kilruane MacDonagh's qualified for the final with Roscrea providing the opposition. A close game developed, and at the full-time whistle Cahill's side were defeated by a single point.

After a number of seasons out of the limelight Kilruane MacDonagh's bounced back in 1985. It turned out to be a dream season for Cahill and his club. After defeating old rivals Roscrea to take a fourth county championship title, Kilruane MacDonagh's represented Tipperary in the provincial series of games. Cahill's side made it all the way to the provincial final where they faced the mighty Blackrock club from Cork. Cahill won a Munster club winners' medal following a 0–12 to 0–6 victory. Kilruane MacDonagh's subsequently qualified for the All-Ireland final where Buffer's Alley of Wexford provided the opposition. The game was regarded as one of the most exciting finals in the fifteen-year history of the inter-county club championship. Cahill's side fell behind early on in the game and trailed at the interval. The sides were level six times in the second-half, however, at the long whistle Kilruane MacDonagh's were the champions by 1–15 to 2–10. It was an All-Ireland club winners' medal for Cahill.

Kilruane MacDonagh's reached the county final again in 1986, but on that occasion they were heavily beaten by Borris-Ileigh. It was the end of the glory days for Cahill's club.

=== Inter-county ===
Cahill's appearances at club level brought him to the attentions of the Tipperary senior hurling team selectors. He made his senior championship debut in a Munster semi-final against Cork in 1980. Tipp were defeated on that occasion as the county was in the midst of a hurling drought.

Tipperary run of bad luck in the championship continued for the next few years, however, in 1984 the team qualified for the Munster final. Cahill was on the panel and was introduced as a substitute. It looked as if Tipp were heading for victory as the team had a decisive lead as full-time approached. Two quick goals by Cork put an end to this and Cahill's side were defeated by 4–15 to 3–14 in a memorable provincial final.

Cahill's involvement with the Tipperary senior team ended shortly after this defeat.

== Team management ==
=== Early experience ===
In retirement from club and inter-county hurling, Cahill became involved in team management at all levels. In 1995 he cut his teeth at inter-county level as manager of the Tipperary minor hurling team. In 1996 it was a successful year for 'the Premier county' as Cahill guided the minors to a Munster final victory over Waterford. Tipp later qualified for the All-Ireland final against Galway. A high-scoring and exciting game developed, however, at full-time both sides were level. The subsequent replay was another exciting affair with Tipp triumphing by 2–14 to 2–12. It was a major success for Cahill.

=== Club ===
Cahill has served as manager, coach and selector with a host of clubs all over the country. In 2004 he agreed to assist Limerick club Doon in their attempt to win the county senior championship for the first time. That campaign ultimately ended in defeat before the championship decider.

In early 2007 Cahill moved west of the Shannon and took over as coach of the Portumna senior hurling team. It was a successful move as Portumna reclaimed the county senior championship title following a 6–12 to 0–11 trouncing of Kinvara. Cahill's Portumna subsequently captured the Connacht club title before lining out in the All-Ireland final. Birr, the most successful team in the history of the championship, provided the opposition. That game turned into a rout as Cahill's side powered to a 3–19 to 3–9 victory and the All-Ireland title.

Cahill left the Portumna set-up shortly after this, however, his break from management didn't last long. In November 2008 he took over as manager of the Graigue–Ballycallan club in Kilkenny. His tenure there was largely unsuccessful.

=== Inter-county ===
Cahill as also gained a wealth of experience as an inter-county manager at senior level.

In 2001 Cahill was appointed manager of the Antrim senior hurling team.

Shortly after resigning from the Antrim position Cahill returned to management when he took charge of the Laois senior hurling team in November 2005.

In November 2009 Cahill returned for a second tenure as manager of the Antrim senior hurling team. After a lacklustre National Hurling League campaign, which saw Antrim record only two victories in the group stages, Cahill's charges were drawn to play Offaly in the Leinster quarter-final. While many expected Antrim to be well beaten, Offaly were made to work for a win after extra-time. Cahill's side subsequently defeated Carlow and Dublin to qualify for the All-Ireland quarter-final for the first time in six years. Cork were the opponents and recorded a 1–25 to 0–19 victory in a game which lacked intensity.

In 2011 Antrim once again played in the Leinster Senior Hurling Championship they played Laois in the Preliminary round and recorded a 1–21 to 3–12 win their first win since entering the Leinster Championship in 2009. They faced Wexford in the quarter-final but lost out on a score of 3–16 to 1–11. They entered the Qualifiers where they drew Westmeath in the Preliminary round and recorded a 2–25 to 1–19 win. In Phase 1 they faced another Leinster team in Carlow and picked up another win this time on a 0–23 to 1–12 scoreline. They then moved on to Phase 3 where they faced Limerick now ever their season came to an end after a 3–22 to 0–12 drubbing to the Munster side. Soon after the loss Cahill stepped down as manager.

Not long after leaving the Antrim post Cahill joined up with the Armagh senior hurling team. He joined as part of manager Michael Johnston managerial backroom team.

In 2026 he joined the backroom team of the Longford Senior Hurling team, managed by his son Diarmuid.

Sporting positions
Preceded by Tom McLean	Antrim Senior Hurling Manager; 2001–2005	Succeeded by Jim McKernan
Preceded by Paudie Butler	Laois Senior Hurling Manager; 2005–2006	Succeeded by Damien Fox
Preceded by Terence McNaughton; Dominic McKinley	Antrim Senior Hurling Manager; 2009–2011	Succeeded by Jerry Wallis
