= Séamus Plunkett =

Irish hurler

Personal information
- Native name: Séamus Pluincéid (Irish)
- Nickname: Cheddar
- Born: 1961 (age 64–65) Portlaoise, County Laois, Ireland

Sport
- Sport: Hurling
- Position: Full-forward
Club
- Years: Club
- Portlaoise
Club titles
- Laois titles: 7
Inter-county
- Years: County
- 1980–1988: Laois
Inter-county titles
- Leinster titles: 0
- All-Irelands: 0
- NHL: 0
- All Stars: 2

Séamus "Cheddar" Plunkett (born 1961) is an Irish former hurler who played as a full-forward for the senior Laois county team.

Plunkett made his first appearance for the team during the 1980-81 National League and was a semi-regular member of the starting fifteen until he left the panel after the 1988 championship. During that time he had little success.

At club level Plunkett is a seven-time county club championship medalist with Portlaoise.

In retirement from playing Plunkett became involved in team management. He served as a selector and manager with Portlaoise and various Laois underage teams, before first taking over as manager of the Laois senior hurling team in 2012.

== Playing career ==
=== Club ===
Plunkett played his club hurling with Portlaoise and had a lengthy career.

Having lost the 1980 championship decider to Camross, both sides met again the following year's final. In a thrilling game Portlaoise denied Camross a sixth successive county title. It was the first of four successive championships for Plunkett and Portlaoise.

Five-in-a-row proved beyond Portlaoise as Camross defeated Plunkett's side by just a single point in 1985.

Two years later Portlaoise were back as the kingpins of county hurling. A 2–13 to 1-5 trouncing of Clonad gave Plunkett his fifth championship medal.

After surrendering their title the following year, Portlaoise faced off against Camross again in 1989. A thrilling draw was followed by a 0–12 to 1–4 victory for Portlaoise. It was Plunkett's sixth championship medal.

Camross got the better of Portlaoise again in 1990, however, Plunkett's side reached a fifth successive championship decider in 1991. A defeat of Clonad gave Plunkett his seventh and final championship medal.

=== Inter-county ===
Plunkett made his senior debut for Laois in a National Hurling League game against Kilkenny during the 1980–81 campaign. It was a winning debut as Plunkett contributed 1–1 in a five-point defeat of "the Cats". Plunkett was a regular during Laois's various National League campaigns throughout the 1980s; however, he had little success in the championship.

== Managerial career ==
=== Laois ===
Plunkett was ratified as manager of the Laois senior team on 18 December 2012. His first National League campaign in charge saw Laois suffer just one defeat in the group stage before winning the Division 2A final and promotion to Division 1B following a 3–14 to 1–9 defeat of Westmeath. Plunkett's side later nearly pulled off a shock defeat of reigning Leinster champions Galway in the provincial semi-final.

Laois's 2014 league campaign saw Plunkett's side preserve their position in Division 1B before narrowly losing to Clare at the quarter-final stage. For the second year in succession Laois nearly pulled off a shock victory over Galway, however, Plunkett's side eventually lost by two points.

In 2015 Laois enjoyed a mixed league campaign but eventually survived in a relegation battle with Antrim. On 28 May 2015 Plunkett announced his resignation as manager after two of his panel members played a club game against the wishes of management. He later reversed his decision and returned as manager less than a week later.

Plunkett succeeded Eddie Brennan as Laois manager when Brennan resigned in November 2020, beginning a second spell in charge, with Laois proposing him in December 2020 and confirming the appointment on 1 February 2021.https://www.skysports.com/gaa/hurling/news/30554/12154736/laois-re-appoint-seamus-cheddar-plunkett-as-senior-hurling-manager He announced his departure in June 2022.

=== Kilkenny (club) ===
In November 2022, it was announced that Plunkett had taken over as manager of Kilkenny intermediate club St Martin's.

== Personal life ==
Plunkett's nickname is "Cheddar", which stems from his schooldays in Portlaoise.

== Honours ==
=== Player ===
Portlaoise

- Laois Senior Hurling Championship (1): 1981, 1982, 1983, 1984, 1987, 1989, 1991

=== Manager ===
Laois

- National Hurling League (Division 2A) (1): 2013

Sporting positions
Preceded by Teddy McCarthy	Laois Senior Hurling Manager; 2012–2015	Succeeded by Ger Cunningham
Preceded by Ger Cunningham	Laois Senior Hurling Manager; 2015–2016	Succeeded by Éamonn Kelly
Preceded by Eddie Brennan	Laois Senior Hurling Manager; 2020–2022	Succeeded by William Maher
