= Richie Power Snr =

Kilkenny hurler

Richie Power
Personal information
- Native name: Risteard de Paor (Irish)
- Born: 8 April 1957 (age 69) Carrickshock, County Kilkenny, Ireland
- Occupation: Sales rep
- Height: 6 ft 0 in (183 cm)

Sport
- Sport: Hurling
- Position: Half-forward
Club
- Years: Club
- 1973–1997: Carrickshock
Club titles
- Kilkenny titles: 0
Inter-county
Years	County	Apps (scores)
1982–1991	Kilkenny	28 (3–37)
Inter-county titles
- Leinster titles: 5
- All-Irelands: 2
- NHL: 4
- All Stars: 2

Richie Power (born 8 April 1957 in Carrickshock, County Kilkenny, Ireland) is an Irish former hurler who played for his local club Carrickshock and at senior level for the Kilkenny county team from 1982 until 1991.

== Playing career ==
=== Club ===
Power played his club hurling with his local Carrickshock club; however, he never won a senior county title.

=== Inter-county ===
Power first came to prominence on the inter-county scene as a member of the Kilkenny minor hurling team. He won a Leinster title in this grade in 1975 before later winning an All-Ireland medal following a victory over Cork. Power later joined the county under-21 team and won both Leinster and All-Ireland honours in 1977.

Power later joined the Kilkenny senior team and won a National Hurling League medal in 1982. He later won his first Leinster title before making a first All-Ireland final appearance. Cork was the opponent that day; however, the Leesiders provided little opposition and Power won his first senior All-Ireland medal. His performance throughout the championship later earned Power an All-Star award. In 1983 he won a second consecutive National League medal before later collecting a second provincial title. Cork were Kilkenny's opponents again in the championship decider and, once again, the Leesiders fell to 'the Cats' giving Power a second All-Ireland medal. Kilkenny lost their provincial crown for the next few years; however, the team returned in 1986 with Power winning a third National League medal. He later picked up a third Leinster medal; however, his side were later defeated by Galway in the All-Ireland semi-final. In spite of this loss he still collected a second All-Star award. In 1987 Power added a fourth Leinster medal to his collection. Kilkenny later reached the All-Ireland final; however, the side were defeated by Galway once again. Three years later in 1990 Power won a fourth National League medal and in 1991 he collected a fifth and final Leinster title. He later played Tipp in a final All-Ireland final appearance; however, he ended up on the losing side on that occasion. Power retired from inter-county hurling following this defeat.
