= Niall Rigney =

Irish hurler and manager

Personal information
- Native name: Damien Ó Roigne (Irish)
- Born: 1969 (age 56–57) Portlaoise, County Laois
- Height: 6 ft 2 in (188 cm)

Sport
- Sport: Hurling
- Position: Wing-forward
Club
- Years: Club
- 1980s-2000s: Portlaoise
Club titles
- Laois titles: 4
Inter-county
Years	County	Apps (scores)
1988-2001	Laois	? (6-23)
Inter-county titles
- Leinster titles: 0
- All-Irelands: 0
- NHL: 0
- All Stars: 0

Niall Rigney (born 1969 in Portlaoise, County Laois) is an Irish retired hurling manager and player. He played hurling for his local club, Portlaoise, and was a member of the Laois senior inter-county team from 1988 to 2001. Rigney went on to manage the Laois senior hurling team from 2008 to 2010.

His brother Brian Rigney played rugby for Leinster and Ireland, while another brother, Colm, played rugby for Connacht.

Sporting positions
Preceded by Damien Fox	Laois Senior Hurling Manager; 2008-2009	Succeeded by Brendan Fennelly
