= Laois Junior Hurling Championship =

- Irish: Craobh Iomáint Sóisir Laoise
- Trophy: Fr Phelan Cup
- Title holders: Castletown GAA (5th title)
- Most titles: Ballypickas GAA (10 titles)
- Sponsors: Laois Shopping Centre

The Laois Junior Hurling Championship is an annual hurling competition contested by lower-tier Laois GAA clubs.

== Junior A ==
The trophy presented to the winners is the Fr Phelan Cup.

The winners of the Laois Junior Championship qualify to represent thecounty in the Leinster Junior Club Hurling Championship. They often do well there, with the likes of Ballyfin (2011) getting to a Leinster Final after winning the Laois Junior Hurling Championship but Kilkenny GAA club St Patrick's beat them on their way to the All-Ireland title. The winners can, in turn, go on to play in the All-Ireland Junior Club Hurling Championship.

=== List of finals ===
(r) = replay

Year	Winner	Score	Opponent	Score
1925	Abbeyleix			
1926	Cuddagh			
1927	Camross			
1928	Durrow			
1929	Ballygeehan			
1930	Mountmellick			
1931	Ballypickas			
1932	Errill			
1933	Clonaslee			
1934	Derrydavey	2-03	Clonad	1-01
1935	Mountmellick	2-07	Rapla	2-01
1936	Ballypickas	8-03	Clonkeen	1-01
1937	Ballacolla	8-06	Portarlington	0-01
1938	Rathdowney	5-04	Rovers (Portlaoise)	4-06
1939	Borris-in-Ossory	3-07	Abbeyleix	4-02
1940	Rovers	6-03	Rathdowney	1-02
1941	Mountmellick	4-02	Ballinakil	1-03
1942	Rovers	4-02	Kyle	1-02
1943	Castletown	3-01	Raheen	2-02
1944	Kyle	2-03	Clonin	1-03
1945	Blandsford (Ballypickas)	6-04	Camross	0-04
1946	Cappamore	4-02	Portarlington	2-00
1947	Slieve Bloom	11-03	Clonad	1-00
1948	Shanahoe	1-03, 3-03 (r), 4-05 (2r)	Clonad	0-06, 2-06 (r), 3-05 (2r)
1949	St Canice's	6-01	Durrow	3-02
1950	Ballacolla	3-01	Killenure	1-01
1951	Abbeyleix	2-08	Mountmellick	1-03
1952	Borris-in-Ossory	5-06	Mountmellick	0-03
1953*	Cullohill	2-03	Killenure	5-04
1954	Rathdowney	4-03	Ballypickas	1-05
1955	Ballypickas	5-04	Errill	2-01
1956	Durrow	5-12	Mountmellick	6-05
1957	Camross	4-02	St Fintan's, Colt	3-03
1958	Park–Ratheniska	2-07	Derrylamogue	3-00
1959	St Fintan's, Colt	1-01	Mountmellick	3-06
1960	St Fintan's, Mountrath	4-07	Portarlington	3-06
1961	Mountmellick	4-09	Ballypickas	2-03
1962	Kilcotton	8-09	Mountmellick	2-02
1963	Ballypickas	6-10	Portlaoise	5-03
1964	Camross	2-10	Rosenallis	4-02
1965	Portlaoise	4-03	Camross	2-05
1966	St Conleth's	2-07	Ballinakill	1-02
1967	Ballyfin	5-04	Clonaslee	0-11
1968	Clonaslee	4-06	Ballypickas	0-02
1969	Ballinakill	2-07	Kyle	0-05
1970	Borris-in-Ossory	2-09	Timahoe	1-03
1971	Park–Ratheniska	6-10	St Fintan's, Mountrath	1-01
1972	Camross	4-03	Ballinakill	1-08
1973	Durrow	4-10	Errill	0-08
1974	Castletown	5-05	Cannonswood	4-06
1975	Rathdowney	2-11	Cannonswood	2-03
1976	Abbeyleix	4-08	Errill	3-06
1977	Kyle	5-07	Rosenallis	3-05
1978	Clonaslee–St Manman's	0-07	Milltown	0-06
1979	Milltown	3-09	Timahoe	0-05
1980	Clough–Ballacolla	2-11	Timahoe	1-08
1981	Camross	2-08	Timahoe	0-07
1982	Kilcotton	0-13	Durrow	3-02
1983	Slieve Bloom	4-06	Ballypickas	1-10
1984	The Harps	3-06	Timahoe	3-05
1985	Ballypickas	2-05	Portlaoise	1-05
1986	Rosenallis	3-15	St Fintan's, Mountrath	3-06
1987	Portlaoise	3-12	Timahoe	1-07
1988	Camross	2-08	St Fintan's, Mountrath	0-08
1989	St Fintan's, Mountrath	1-05	Clough–Ballacolla	0-07
1990	Clough–Ballacolla	0-11	Timahoe	1-06
1991	The Harps	1-08, 3-07 (r)	Shanahoe	0-11, 1-08 (r)
1992	Castletown	1-22	Shanahoe	1-06
1993	Portlaoise	1-09, 2-13 (r), 3-11 (2r)	Ballypickas	2-06, 2-13 (r), 3-08 (2r)
1994	Ballypickas	1-07	Kyle	0-05
1995	The Harps	1-09	Camross	1-06
1996	St Fintan's, Colt	1-04, 3-09 (r)	Trumera	1-04, 1-06 (r)
1997	Trumera	2-14	Shanahoe	2-07
1998	Castletown	5-05	Kyle	0-03
1999	Shanahoe	4-07	Ballypickas	0-06
2000	Timahoe	2-08	The Harps	0-06
2001	Mountmellick	4-14	Ballypickas	0-06
2002	Rathdowney	2-11	Kyle	0-11
2003	Camross	2-09	Ballypickas	0-05
2004	Rosenallis	1-10	Park–Ratheniska	0-10
2005	The Harps	3-09	Park–Ratheniska	2-08
2006	Kyle	0-16	Camross	1-10
2007	Clough–Ballacolla	1-14	Park–Ratheniska	2-08
2008	Camross	4-11	Timahoe	0-07
2009	Kyle	1-15	Timahoe	0-11
2010	Trumera	4-11	Timahoe	1-13
2011	Park–Ratheniska	2-14	Borris-in-Ossory/Kilcotton	0-03
2012	Timahoe	1-14. 0-16 (r)	Ballypickas	1-11, 1-10 (r)
2013	Portlaoise	1-14	Clough–Ballacolla	0-08
2014	Camross	1-11	Kyle	0-11
2015	Clough–Ballacolla	2-14	Castletown	2-13
2016	Slieve Bloom	2-24	Rathdowney–Errill	2-06
2017	Ballypickas	2-10	Rathdowney–Errill	2-09
2018	Mountmellick	1-15	Castletown	0-10
2019	Park–Ratheniska/Timahoe	4-11	The Harps	2-11
2020	The Harps	1-16	Portlaoise	1-12
2021	Ballypickas	3-11	Abbeyleix	2-09
2022	Abbeyleix	1-16	Park–Ratheniska/Timahoe	0-12
2023	Park–Ratheniska/Timahoe	3-18	Camross	2-12
2024	Ballypickas	1-16	Borris-in-Ossory/Kilcotton	2-11
2025	Clough–Ballacolla	3-20	Portlaoise	0-13
2026	Castletown	3-12	Park–Ratheniska/Timahoe	2-12

=== Roll of Honour ===
Club	Titles	Years won
Ballypickas	10	1931, 1936, 1945, 1955, 1963, 1985, 1994, 2017, 2021, 2024
Camross	9	1927, 1957, 1964, 1972, 1981, 1988, 2003, 2008, 2014
Mountmellick	6	1930, 1935, 1941, 1961, 2001, 2018
The Harps	5	1984, 1991, 1995, 2005, 2020
Castletown	5	1943, 1974, 1992, 1998, 2026
Clough–Ballacolla	4	1990, 2007, 2015, 2025
Abbeyleix	4	1925, 1951, 1976, 2022
Portlaoise	4	1965, 1987, 1993, 2013
Kyle	4	1944, 1977, 2006, 2009
St Fintan's, Mountrath	4	1940, 1960, 1975, 1989
Slieve Bloom	3	1947, 1983, 2016
Rathdowney	3	1938, 1954, 2002
Ballacolla	3	1937, 1950, 1980
Clonaslee–St Manman's	3	1933, 1968, 1978
Durrow	3	1928, 1956, 1973
Borris-in-Ossory	3	1939, 1952, 1970
Park–Ratheniska/Timahoe	2	2019, 2023
Timahoe	2	2000, 2012
Trumera	2	1997, 2010
Rosenallis	2	1986, 2004
Shanahoe	2	1948, 1999
St Fintan's, Colt	2	1959, 1996
Kilcotton	2	1962, 1982
Ratheniska	2	1958, 1971
Park–Ratheniska	1	2011
Miltown	1	1979
Ballinakill	1	1969
Ballyfin	1	1967
St Conleths	1	1966
Cullohill	1	1953
St Canices	1	1949
Cappamore	1	1946
Rovers	1	1942
Derrydavey	1	1934
Errill	1	1932
Ballygeehan	1	1929
Cuddagh	1	1926

== Junior B ==
Laois Junior B Hurling Championship
- Irish: Craobh Iomáint Sóisir B Laoise
- Founded: 1974
- Trophy: Eamon MacCluskey Cup
- Title holders: Kyle (3rd title)
- First winner: Rathdowney
- Most titles: Camross (6 titles)
- Sponsors: Lifestyle Furniture

The Laois Junior B Hurling Championship is an annual hurling competition contested by fourth grade Laois GAA clubs.

The trophy presented to the winners is the Eamon MacCluskey Cup.

=== List of finals ===
(r) = replay

Year	Winner	Score	Opponent	Score
1974	Rathdowney	5-06	Slieve Bloom	0-14
1975	Ballyfin	2-10	Durrow	3-03
1976	Timahoe	3-05	Kyle	2-07
1977	No competition			
1978	No competition			
1979	No competition			
1980	No competition			
1981	No competition			
1982	No competition			
1983	Borris-in-Ossory	3-13	Cullohill	2-04
1984	Rosenallis	1-14	Abbeyleix	1-06
1985	Clonaslee–St Manman's	1-10	Clonad	1-07
1986	Miltown	1-09	Kyle	0-06
1987	Park–Ratheniska	4-01	Castletown	2-10
1988	Camross	3-05	Borris-in-Ossory	1-06
1989	Camross	3-06	Rathdowney	0-06
1990	Castletown	2-10	Mountmellick	2-05
1991	Trumera	3-18	Errill	3-07
1992	The Harps	3-04	Rathdowney	1-07
1993	Kyle	2-11	Park–Ratheniska	2-02
1994	Camross	1-07	Rathdowney	1-04
1995	Rathdowney	2-04	Borris-in-Ossory	1-05
1996	Castletown	2-09	Slieve Bloom	1-06
1997	Borris-in-Ossory	3-10	Slieve Bloom	1-10
1998	Mountmellick	2-08, 2-07 (r)	Clonad	2-08, 0-08 (r)
1999	Slieve Bloom	2-04	Castletown	0-07
2000	Clonad	3-07	Camross	1-12
2001	Camross	1-12	Clonaslee–St Manman's	0-09
2002	Clonaslee–St Manman's	2-16	Portlaoise	2-05
2003	Ballinakill	3-07	Ballyfin	1-08
2004	Clough–Ballacolla	1-09, 1-12 (r)	Ballyfin	2-06, 0-07 (r)
2005	Kilcotton	1-11	Ballyfin	1-08
2006	Borris-in-Ossory	1-08	Abbeyleix	0-02
2007	Ballypickas	2-07	The Harps	0-12
2008	The Harps	3-11	Camross	0-17
2009	Abbeyleix	2-18	Ballyfin	1-13
2010	Ballinakill	3-05	Colt	1-09
2011	Camross	4-11	Rathdowney–Errill	1-17
2012	Mountmellick	3-11, 1-11 (r)	Camross	1-17, 0-12 (r)
2013	Castletown/Slieve Bloom	2-12	Abbeyleix	1-10
2014	The Harps	2-12	Rathdowney–Errill	1-13
2015	Abbeyleix	3-11	Borris-in-Ossory/Kilcotton	0-12
2016	Camross	1-13	Kyle	0-15
2017	Mountmellick	4-18	Camross	1-09
2018	Kyle	0-15	Camross	1-11
2019	St Fintan's, Mountrath	0-19	Camross	0-12
2020	Camross	3-20	Portlaoise	1-10
2021	Borris/Kilcotton	0-15	Rosenallis	1-07
2022	Rosenallis	3-16	Clough–Ballacolla	1-07
2023	The Harps	1-16(a.e.t) 5 penalties	Clough–Ballacolla	0-19 4 penalties
2024	Clough–Ballacolla	2-17	Borris/Kilcotton	1-07
2025	Ballinakill	2-11	Ballyfin	1-13
2026	Kyle	4-11	Castletown	3-08

=== Roll of honour ===
Club	Titles	Years Won
Camross	6	1988, 1989, 1994, 2001, 2011, 2020
Ballinakill	4	2003, 2010, 2016, 2025
The Harps	4	1992, 2008, 2014, 2023
Kyle	3	1993, 2018, 2026
Mountmellick	3	1998, 2012, 2017
Borris-in-Ossory	3	1983, 1997, 2006
Clough–Ballacolla	2	2004, 2024
Rosenallis	2	1984, 2022
Abbeyleix	2	2009, 2015
Clonaslee–St Manman's	2	1985, 2002
Castletown	2	1990, 1996
Rathdowney	2	1974, 1995
Borris/Kilcotton	1	2021
St Fintan's, Mountrath	1	2019
Castletown/Slieve Bloom	1	2013
Ballypickas	1	2007
Kilcotton	1	2005
Clonad	1	2000
Slieve Bloom	1	1999
Trumera	1	1991
Park–Ratheniska	1	1987
Miltown	1	1986
Timahoe	1	1976
Ballyfin	1	1975

== Junior C ==
Laois Junior C Hurling Championship
- Irish: Craobh Iomáint Sóisir C Laoise
- Founded: 1994
- Title holders: Camross (3rd title)
- Most titles: Camross, Rathdowney-Errill, The Harps, Castletown (3 titles)
- Sponsors: Lifestyle Furniture

The Laois Junior C Hurling Championship is an annual hurling competition contested by fifth grade Laois GAA clubs.

=== List of finals ===
Year	Winner	Score	Opponent	Score
1994	Graiguecullen		Kilcotton	
1995	Kilcotton		St Fintan's, Colt	
1996	St Fintan's, Colt		Ballylinan	
1997	Castletown		Trumera	
1998	Trumera		Ballylinan	
1999	Ballyfin		Ballylinan	
2000	Ballylinan		Park–Ratheniska	
2001	Kilcotton		Park–Ratheniska	
2002	Park–Ratheniska		Arles–Killeen	
2003	Arles–Killeen		Timahoe	
2004	Abbeyleix		Timahoe	
2005	The Harps		Shanahoe	
2006	Camross		Ballylinan	
2007	Ballypickas		St Fintan's, Colt	
2008	St Fintan's, Colt		The Harps	
2009	Ballinakill	2-06	Rathdowney–Errill	0-10
2010	Rathdowney–Errill	2-19	Ballylinan	4-07
2011	The Harps	3-09	Portlaoise	2-07
2012	Clonaslee	3-08	Ballylinan	1-10
2013	Rathdowney-Errill	2-14	Rosenallis	1-10
2014	Borris–Kilcotton		Mountmellick	
2015	Castletown	1-21	Shanahoe	1-10
2016	Camross	1-10	Slieve Margy	0-06
2017	Mountmellick	2-06	Rosenallis	1-08
2018	Portlaoise			
2019	Rosenallis			
2020	Rosenallis			
2021	Castletown			
2022	The Harps	3-19	Park–Ratheniska/Timahoe	4-13
2023	Ballyfin			
2024	Rathdowney-Errill			
2025	Borris–Kilcotton			
2026	Camross	1-13	Clough–Ballacolla	1-08

=== Roll of honour ===
Club	Titles	Years Won
Camross	3	2006, 2016, 2026
Rathdowney-Errill	3	2010, 2013, 2024
The Harps	3	2005, 2011, 2022
Castletown	3	1997, 2015, 2021
Borris–Kilcotton	2	2014, 2025
Ballyfin	2	1999, 2023
Rosenallis	2	2019, 2020
St Fintan's, Colt	2	1996, 2008
Kilcotton	2	1995, 2001
Portlaoise	1	2018
Mountmellick	1	2017
Clonaslee	1	2012
Ballinakill	1	2009
Ballypickas	1	2007
Abbeyleix	1	2004
Arles–Killeen	1	2003
Park–Ratheniska	1	2002
Ballylinan	1	2000
Trumera	1	1998
Graiguecullen	1	1994
