= Raheen, County Laois =

Village near Portlaoise, County Laois, Ireland

Raheen An Ráithín
- Village
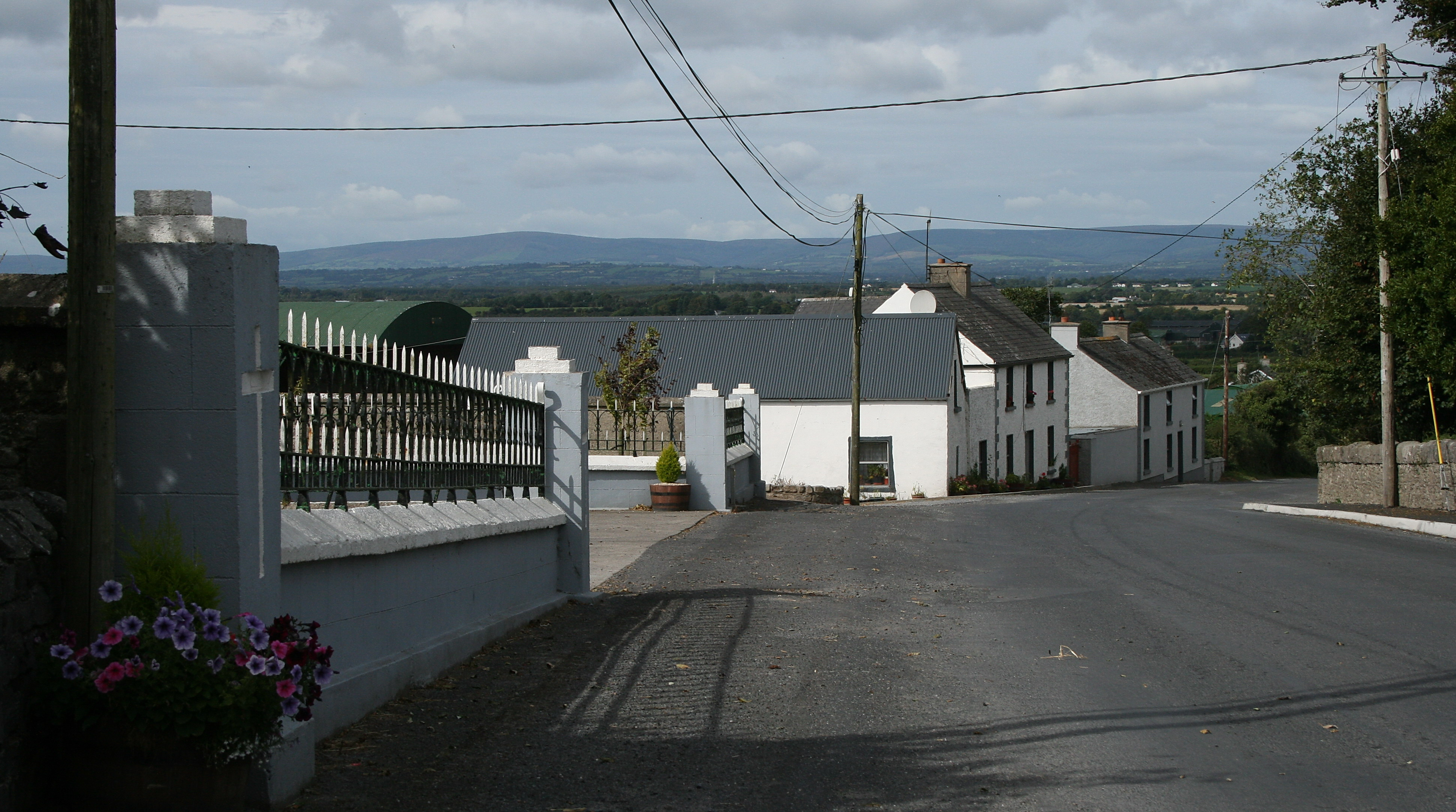
- Raheen village

- Location in Ireland
- Coordinates: 52°57′55″N 7°22′11″W
- Country: Ireland
- Province: Leinster
- County: County Laois
- Time zone: UTC+0 (WET)
  - Summer (DST): UTC-1 (IST (WEST))
- Irish Grid Reference: S426904

Raheen (Irish: An Ráithín, meaning 'little ringfort') is a small village south of Portlaoise in County Laois, Ireland.

== History ==
The Gothic Revival Roman Catholic parish church of Raheen is dedicated to St. Fintan and dates from 1857. The first Catholic church, a thatched chapel, was built in 1729 on a site granted by a Protestant family named Baldwin. Mr. Baldwin granted the land after seeing poor Catholics assembled at Mass in a deep pit, which is called the Mass Pit even to the present time.

The poorer sort of Irish natives," wrote an English tourist in 1746, "are Roman Catholics, who make no scruple to assemble in the open fields. As we passed yesterday in a by-road, we saw a priest under a tree, with a large assembly about him, celebrating Mass in his proper habit; and though at a great distance from him, we heard him distinctly. These sort of people seem to be very solemn and sincere in their religion.

The graveyard in the village marks the site of the old thatched chapel.

== Education ==
There is one primary school, Tobar an Léinn, located in the area.

== Sport ==
St. Fintans, Colt GAA is the local Gaelic football and hurling club. Raheen F.C. is a local association football (soccer) club.

== Gallery ==
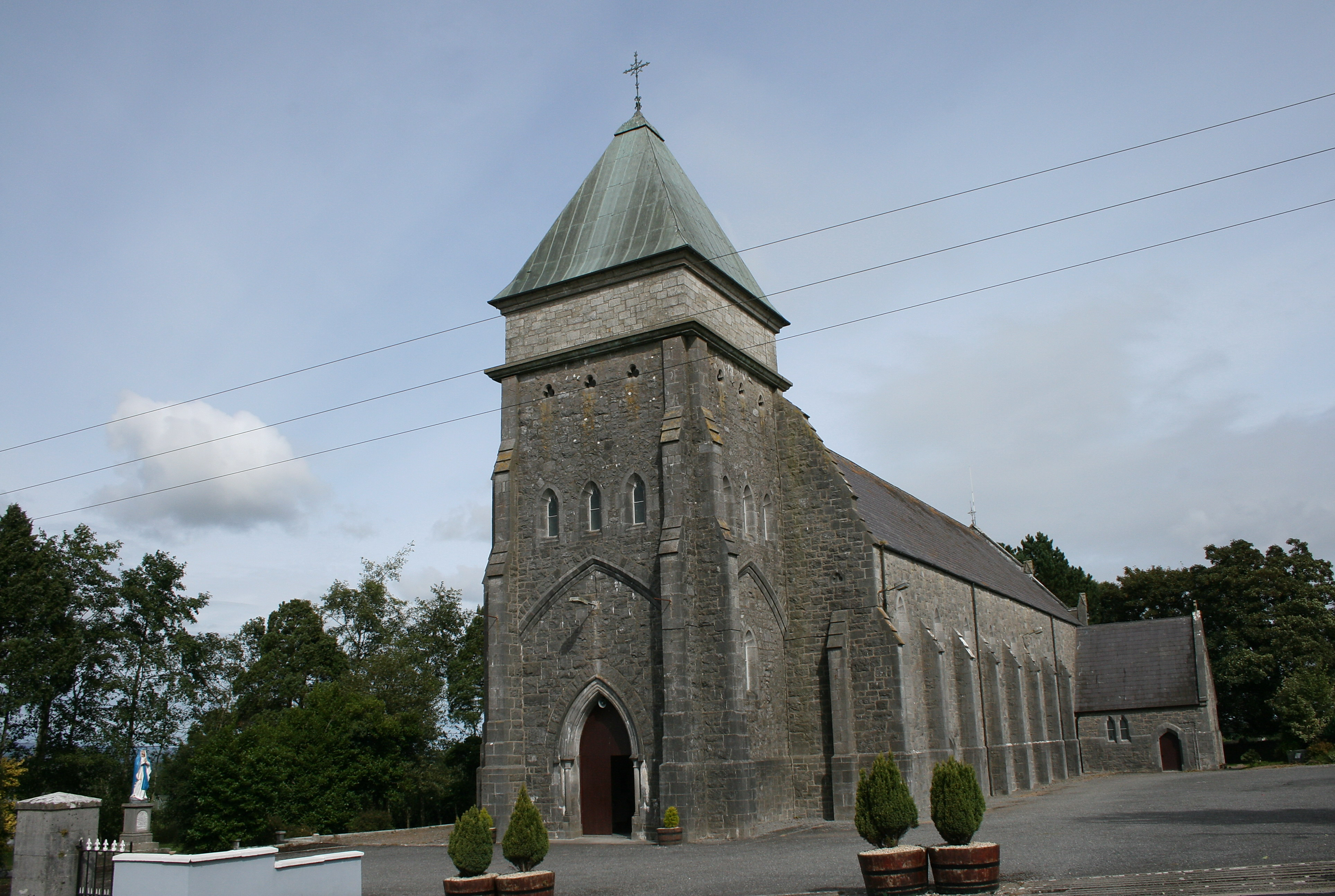
St Fintan's Church (built 1857)

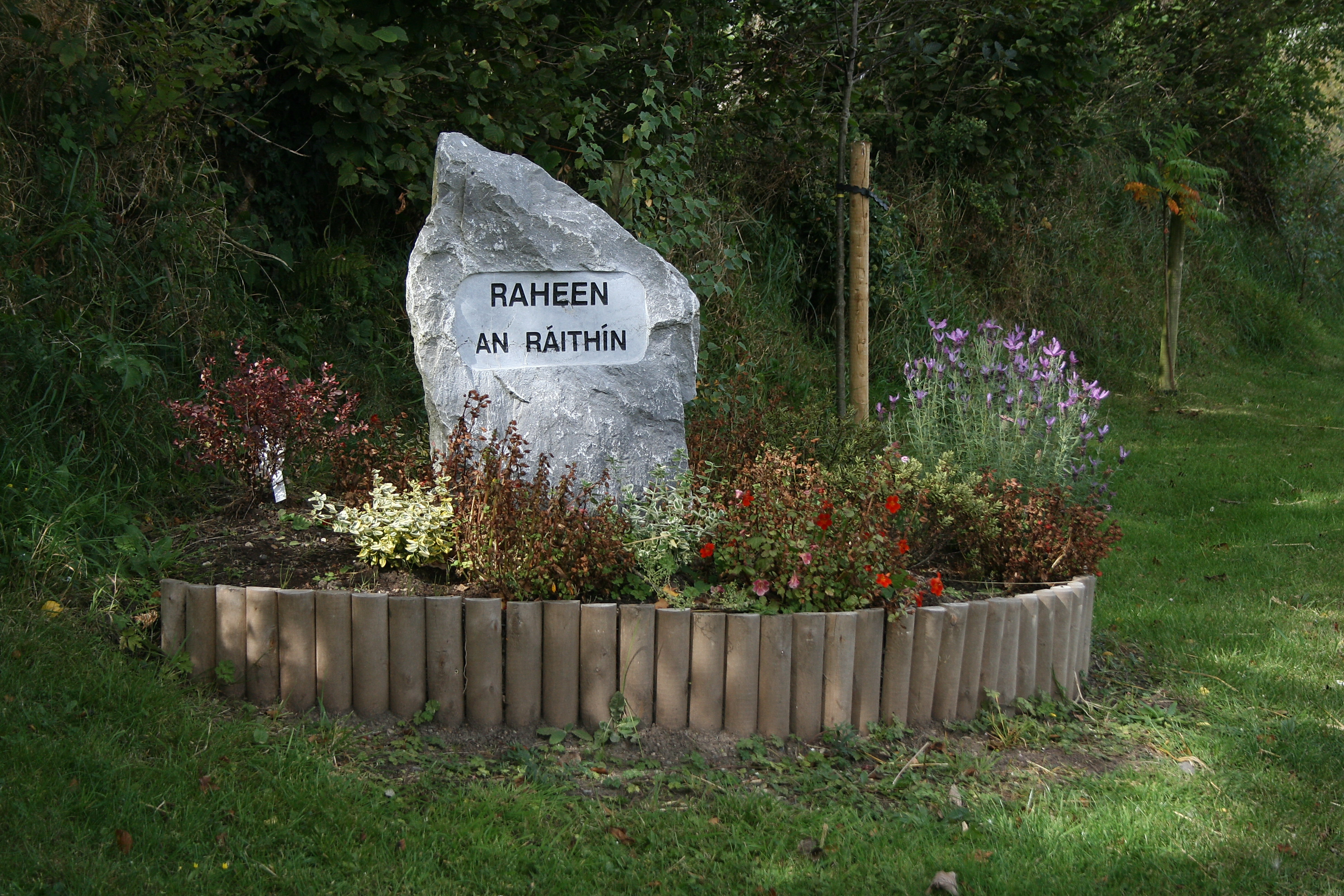
Welcome signage

== See also ==
- List of towns and villages in Ireland
