= St Fintan's, Colt GAA =

GAA club in County Laois, Ireland

Colt GAA
- Naomh Fiontán, Coillte
- Founded: 1953
- County: Laois
- Colours: Blue and Gold
- Grounds: Páirc Shéain Uí hUidhrín
- Coordinates: 52°58′00.99″N 7°22′08.95″W

Playing kits
Standard colours

Colt GAA is a Gaelic football and hurling club in County Laois, Ireland.

The club is located in the parish of Raheen and amalgamates with Shanahoe GAA and Clonad GAA to play underage football and hurling.

Since 2020, Colt has amalgamated with Shanahoe to play hurling in the Laois Premier Intermediate Hurling Championship, but later relegated to Intermediate Championship 2021. The club has never won the Laois Senior Hurling Championship but won the Laois Intermediate Hurling Championship four times in 1965, 1971, 1979 and 2008. The club won the Division 2 League in 2010 & Senior B Hurling League 2013

Colt has also won the Laois Junior Hurling Championship twice in 1959 and 1996. In 1996, a double was achieved as Colt also won the Laois Junior "C" Hurling Championship with their second team. The Junior team's most recent success was in 2019 when Colt won the Division 5 hurling league.

Football, since 2020, is the way Colt is represented. In 1998, the club won the Laois Junior "B" Football Championship title for the first time ever. In 2004, the All-County Football League Division 4 title was also won. Since 2011 the club has played many county finals and has not won a title since 1998 in football.

The club grounds are called Pairc Sheáin Uí hUidhrín in honour of founding member Johnny Hearns and the club colours are blue and gold.

== History ==
There was a club in the area before Colt called Raheen. This disbanded and later people got together to set up Colt GAA.

== Achievements ==
- Laois Intermediate Hurling Championship (4) 1965, 1971, 1979, 2008
- Laois Intermediate Hurling League Winners (1) 2010
- Laois Senior B Hurling League Winners (1) 2013
- Laois Junior Hurling Championship (2) 1959, 1996
- Laois Junior C Hurling Championship (1) 1996
- Laois Junior C Hurling League Winners 2008, 2011
- Laois Junior B Football Championship (1) 1998
- All-County Football League Division 4 2004
- All-County Football League Division 5 1997

== Notable players ==
- James Keyes, played for Laois and also for Ireland in the Shinty–Hurling International Series
- Chris Murray. Played for Laois & U21 Shinty Ireland
