= Damien Fox =

Irish sportsperson

Personal information
- Native name: Damien Ó Sionnaigh (Irish)
- Born: Tullamore, County Offaly

Sport
- Sport: Gaelic football
- Position: Goalkeeper
Club
- Years: Club
- 1977–present: Tullamore
Club titles
- Offaly titles: 1
Inter-county
- Years: County
- 1980s 1980s: Offaly; London
Inter-county titles
- Leinster titles: 0
- All-Irelands: 1 ('B' title)
- NHL: 0
- All Stars: 0

Damien Fox (born 1961 in Tullamore, County Offaly) is an Irish sportsperson. The Gift as he is known on and off the field by his peers, plays hurling with his local club Tullamore and was a member of the Offaly and London senior inter-county teams at various times during the 1980s.

== Playing career ==
Damiens hurling career started in 1964 aged 3 as the Tullamore team mascot, with whom his father played, that won the Offaly senior hurling title. In 1977 at just 16, Damien himself was on the Tullamore first team, which had been relegated to intermediate. After winning intermediate and senior B in 1989 and 1990 they regained senior status.

In 2009 at the age of 48, Damian won a Senior 'A' championship as the Tullamore goalie. This was Tullamores first Senior Hurling championship for 45 years.

== Managerial career ==
Damien started his managerial career in 1997 when he managed the Longford Minors. Since then he has coached and managed at the highest level including managing Laois to the Division 2 title in 2007. Apart from the Laois job he has managed club sides Clonaslee Gaels, Tinnahinch, Portlaoise and Castletown Geoghegan. He was also Offaly Minor coach in 2010.
Damien took over as Lucan Sarsfields GAA senior hurling manager in 2012. Lucan compete in Dublin's Div 1 and 'A' championship.

Sporting positions
Preceded by Dinny Cahill	Laois Senior Hurling Manager; 2006–2008	Succeeded by Niall Rigney
