= Castletown GAA =

GAA club in County Laois, Ireland

Castletown
- Baile an Chaisleáin
- Founded: 1974
- County: Laois
- Nickname: The Village
- Colours
- Grounds: Castletown GAA Grounds
- Coordinates: 52°58′49″N 7°30′10″W

Playing kits
Standard colours

Senior Club Championships
	All Ireland	Leinster champions	Laois champions
Hurling:	0	0	8

Castletown GAA is a Gaelic Athletic Association club in Castletown, County Laois, Ireland. The club is affiliated to the Laois County Board and is primarily concerned with the game of hurling.

== History ==
Located in the village of Castletown, about 3.5 km from Mountrath, Castletown GAA Club was founded on 23 December 1973 before officially affiliating to the Laois County Board in early 1974. Denis Wall, a returned emigrant from England, was instrumental in the creation of the new club, however, hurling had been played by many different clubs in the area, including Cuddagh.

Success was immediate for the new club, with Castletown winning the first of four Laois JAHC titles in 1974. Castletown secured senior status for the first time the following year, when the club won the Laois IHC title. Further Laois IHC titles were won in 1980, 1986 and 1993.

The 10-year period from 1995 to 2005 was, arguably, the most successful in Castletown's history. The club won eight Laois SHC titles from 10 finals appearances in 11 seasons during that time. This included a record-equalling five successive titles between 1999 and 2003. Castletown also contested three Leinster Club SHC final between 1997 and 2001, however, they lost out to Birr on each of those occasions.

== Honours ==
- Laois Senior Hurling Championship (8): 1995, 1997, 1999, 2000, 2001, 2002, 2003, 2005
- Laois Senior A Hurling Championsship (1): 2016
- Laois Premier Intermediate Hurling Championship (1): 2026
- Laois Intermediate Hurling Championship (4): 1975, 1980, 1986, 1993
- Laois Junior A Hurling Championship (4): 1974, 1992, 1998, 2026
- Laois Junior B Hurling Championship (3): 1990, 1996, 2013 (as Castletown/Slieve Bloom)
- Laois Junior C Hurling Championship (3): 1997, 2015, 2021

== Notable players ==
- Ryan Mullaney: Joe McDonagh Cup-winner (2019)
