= The Harps GAA =

GAA club in County Laois, Ireland

The Harps
- Na Cláirsigh
- Founded: 1984
- County: Laois
- Nickname: Durrow Harps, Cullohill Harps
- Colours: Red and Yellow
- Grounds: The Harps GAA Ground, Castledurrow Demesne
- Coordinates: 52°51′2″N 7°23′43″W

Playing kits
Standard colours

Senior Club Championships
	All Ireland	Leinster champions	Laois champions
Hurling:	0	0	1

The Harps GAA is a hurling, Gaelic football and camogie club in County Laois, Ireland. It is a combination of players from the villages of Cullohill and Durrow.

Hurling and camogie are the dominant sports in the club but, the club also fields football teams.

The club colours are yellow with red trim, and its grounds are in Durrow and Cullohill.

== History ==
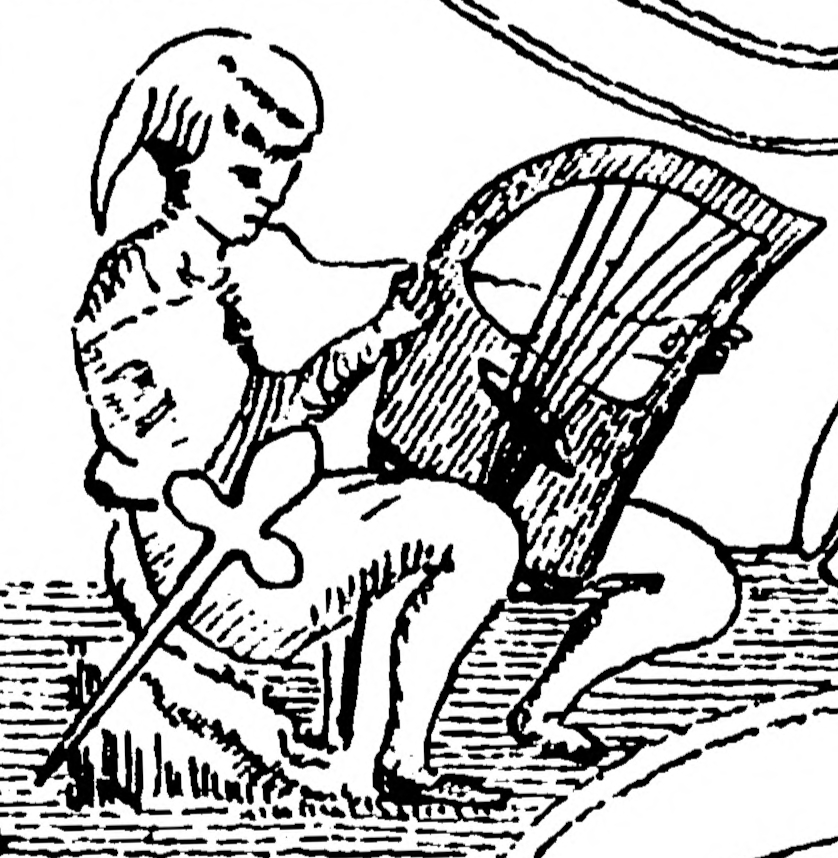
Durrow High Cross depicts King David playing the harp on its left arm.

The club was formed in 1984 as an amalgamation of the old clubs of Durrow and Cullohill. The club's name refer to the Durrow High Cross (9th century AD), which features a carving of King David playing a kinnor (harp), and also to the Gaelic harp as a symbol of Ireland.

In their very first year, the club reached the Laois Senior Hurling Championship final but lost to Portlaoise in a replay. They returned to the final in 1997 and 1998 but lost both to Castletown and Portlaoise respectively. In 2016, The Harps were relegated to second tier hurling to Senior A.

Clare GAA All-Ireland winner Ollie Baker took on the club's hurling manager position in 2022.

== Honours ==
Hurling Championship

- Laois Senior Hurling Championship - 2026
- Laois Senior B Hurling Championship - 1996, 2001, 2025
- Laois Premier Intermediate Hurling Championship - 2020
- Laois Junior A Hurling Championship 1984, 1991, 1995, 2005, 2020
- Laois Junior B Hurling Championship - 1992, 2008, 2014, 2023
- Laois Junior C Hurling Championship - 2005, 2011, 2022
- Laois Under-20/21 A Hurling Championship - 1990, 2006, 2022, 2023, 2024, 2025
- Laois Under-21 B Hurling Championship - 1998, 2003
- Laois Minor A Hurling Championship - 1986, 1987, 1992, 2004, 2007, 2013, 2019, 2023
- Laois Minor B Hurling Championship - 2001
- Palmer Cup - 2011, 2016

Football Championship

- Laois Intermediate Football Championship - 1994
- Laois Junior A Football Championship - 1989, 2000
- Laois Junior B Football Championship - 2012
- Laois Junior C Football Championship - 2001
- Laois Under-21 B Football Championship - 1999, 2000
- Laois *Minor B Football Championship - 1995, 1996, 2005, 2016

== Notable players ==
Club players who have represented their county or province include:

- Mick Bolger, #2 on the 1985 hurling win over Wexford that qualified Laois for a Leinster final for the first time in 34 years
- Pádraig Delaney
- Morgan Kelly, #1 on the 1985 hurling win over Wexford that qualified Laois for a Leinster final for the first time in 34 years
- Brian Shortall, Australian rules footballer
