= Aidan Corby =

Irish hurler

Personal information
- Native name: Aodán Ó Corrbu (Irish)
- Born: 1996 (age 29–30) Ballacolla, County Laois, Ireland

Sport
- Sport: Hurling
- Position: Midfield
Club
- Years: Club
- Clough–Ballacolla
Club titles
- Laois titles: 5
Inter-county
- Years: County
- 2016-present: Laois
Inter-county titles
- Leinster titles: 0
- All-Irelands: 0
- NHL: 0
- All Stars: 0

Aidan Corby (born 1996) is an Irish hurler. At club level he plays with Clough–Ballacolla and at inter-county level with the Laois senior hurling team. He usually lines out at midfield.

== Career ==
Corby first played hurling at juvenile and underage levels with the Clough–Ballacolla club. He progressed to adult level and won his first Laois SHC title after a defeat of Camross in 2015. Corby was also part of the Clough–Ballacolla team that won three successive Laois SHC titles between 2020 and 2022. He won a fifth SHC title as team captain in 2024.

At inter-county level, Corby first played for Laois during a two-year tenure with the Minor team in 2013 and 2014. He later spent two years with the under-21 team but ended his underage career without success. Coby made his senior team debut during the 2016 Walsh Cup, was on and off the team over the following few years. He won his first silverware in 2024 when Laois claimed the National League Division 2A title. Corby was at midfield when Offaly beat Laois in the 2024 Joe McDonagh Cup final. He ended the season by being named on the Team of the Year.

== Honours ==
Clough–Ballacolla

- Laois Senior Hurling Championship: 2015, 2020, 2021, 2022, 2024 (c)

Laois

- National Hurling League Division 2A: 2024
