= 1991 Laois Senior Hurling Championship =

Annual hurling competition season

- Dates: 18 May – 22 September 1991
- Teams: 12
- Champions: Portlaoise (9th title); Séamus Plunkett (captain)
- Runners-up: Clonad

Tournament statistics
- Matches played: 18
- Goals scored: 60 (3.33 per match)
- Points scored: 340 (18.89 per match)

The 1991 Laois Senior Hurling Championship was the 98th staging of the Laois Senior Hurling Championship since its establishment by the Laois County Board in 1888. The championship ran from 18 May to 22 September 1991.

Camross were the defending champions, however, they were beaten by Clonad in the quarter-finals.

The final was played on 22 September 1991 at O'Moore Park in Portlaoise, between Portlaoise and Clonad, in what was their third meeting in the final overall. Portlaoise won the match by 1–14 to 0–07 to claim their ninth championship title overall and a first title in two years.

== Results ==
=== First round ===
18 May 1991 First round	Clonad	5-12 - 3-10	Mountrath	Páirc Acragar

31 May 1991 First round	St Patrick's	1-07 - 1-07	The Harps	O'Moore Park

2 June 1991 First round	St Fintan's	1-02 - 3-12	Portlaoise	O'Keeffe Park

2 June 1991 First round	Rathdowney	0-07 - 2-12	Rosenallis	St Fintan's Park

2 June 1991 First round	Camross	3-17 - 3-02	Castletown Gaels	O'Keeffe Park

14 June 1991 First round	Errill	1-06 - 2-12	Borris Gaels	St Fintan's Park

23 June 1991 First round replay	St Patrick's	0-08 - 2-09	The Harps	O'Moore Park

=== Losers' group ===
28 June 1991 Quarter-final	St Fintan's	3-04 - 0-12	St Patrick's	Durrow Grounds

6 July 1991 Quarter-final	Rathdowney	2-14 - 2-05	Mountrath	O'Keeffe Park

13 July 1991 Semi-final	Errill	1-10 - 0-04	St Fintan's	Knockmore Grounds

28 July 1991 Semi-final	Rathdowney	3-12 - 3-09	Castletown Gaels	St Fintan's Park

- Errill and Rathdowney qualified for the losers' group final which doubled up as a quarter-final.

=== Quarter-finals ===
28 July 1991 Quarter-final	Borris Gaels	3-13 - 3-10	Rosenallis	St Fintan's Park

18 August 1991 Quarter-final	Clonad	3-12 - 3-07	Camross	Kelly O'Daly Park

23 August 1991 Quarter-final	Errill	1-11 - 0-10	Rathdowney	O'Keeffe Park

25 August 1991 Quarter-final	Portlaoise	1-08 - 0-09	The Harps	St Fintan's Park

=== Semi-finals ===
31 August 1991 Semi-final	Portlaoise	2-14 - 1-14	Borris Gaels	O'Moore Park

8 September 1991 Semi-final	Clonad	1-10 - 0-08	Errill	O'Moore Park

=== Final ===
22 September 1991 Final	Portlaoise	1-14 - 0-07	Clonad	O'Moore Park
