= 2026 Laois Senior Hurling Championship =

Annual hurling competition season

- Dates: 10 July – 18 October 2026
- Teams: 10
- Sponsor: Laois Shopping Centre
- Champions: The Harps (1st title); Pádraic Dunne (captain); Ken Hogan (manager)
- Runners-up: Camross; Cathal Cuddy (captain); Tomás Burke (manager)
- Relegated: Ballyfin

Tournament statistics
- Matches played: 31
- Goals scored: 86 (2.77 per match)
- Points scored: 1174 (37.87 per match)
- Top scorer(s): Ciarán Comerford (1-56)

The 2026 Laois Senior Hurling Championship was the 133rd staging of the Laois Senior Hurling Championship since its establishment by the Laois County Board in 1888. The championship ran from 10 July to 18 October 2026.

Clough–Ballacolla were the defending champions, however, they were beaten by The Harps in the semi-finals. Ballyfin were relegated after just one year in the top flight.

The final was played on 18 October 2026 at Laois Hire O'Moore Park in Port Laoise, between The Harps and Camross, in what was their first ever meeting in the final. The Harps won the match by 2–23 to 0–13 to claim their first ever championship title.

Ciarán Comerford was the championship's top scorer with 1-56.

== Format change ==
2026 is the second year with ten teams taking part which was adopted by clubs at a County Committee meeting in November 2023. Teams are drawn into two groups of five but play against the teams in the other group.

== Team changes ==
=== To Championship ===
Promoted from the Laois Premier Intermediate Hurling Championship

- Ballyfin

=== From Championship ===
Relegated to Laois Premier Intermediate Hurling Championship

- Castletown

== Group stage ==
The draw for the group stage placings took place on 26 February 2026.

=== Group A table ===
Semi-finals Quarter-finals Relegation playoff

Team	Matches				Score			Pts
Team	Pld	W	D	L	For	Against	Diff	Pts
Camross	5	4	0	1	162	137	25	8
Rosenallis	5	2	0	3	89	97	-8	4
Abbeyleix	5	2	0	3	105	127	-22	4
Portlaoise	5	1	1	3	77	138	-61	3
Ballinakill	5	1	0	4	111	130	-19	2

=== Group B table ===
Semi-finals Quarter-finals Relegation playoff

Team	Matches				Score			Pts
Team	Pld	W	D	L	For	Against	Diff	Pts
Clough–Ballacolla	5	5	0	0	142	85	57	10
The Harps	5	4	0	1	139	98	41	8
Borris–Kilcotton	5	3	1	1	130	111	19	7
Rathdowney–Errill	5	2	0	3	130	113	17	4
Ballyfin (R)	5	0	0	5	88	137	-49	0

=== Round 1 ===
10 July 2026 Round 1	Portlaoise	2-15 - 1-15	Ballyfin	Laois Hire O'Moore Park
	C Duggan 0-7 (0-5 frees), L Conroy 2-1, D Delaney 0-3, D O’Mahoney 0-2, C Taylor and C Rigney 0-1 each.	Report	G Dunphy (0-3 frees, 0-1 65) and E Duff 0-5 each, C Dunne 1-0, G Hofmeister 0-2, C Quinn, D Connolly and A Connolly 0-1 each.

11 July 2026 Round 1	Camross	2-31 - 5-16	The Harps	Laois Hire O'Moore Park
	T Keyes 0-8, E Gaughan 0-6 (0-3 frees), Z Keenan 0-5 (0-4 frees), M Dowling and C Collier 1-1 each, J Cuddy, T Cuddy, O Phelan, and G Burke 0-2 each, D Delaney and D Drennan 0-1 each.	Report	Justin Duggan 3-1, Ciarán Comerford 0-7 (0-3 frees), E Murphy 0-5 (0-1 free), M Monaghan 1-1, P Delaney 1-0 (peno), E Delaney and Cody Comerford 0-1 each.

11 July 2026 Round 1	Ballinakill	2-18 - 1-24	Rathdowney–Errill	Laois Hire O'Moore Park
	B Duggan 1-5 (0-3fs, 1-0 pen), B O'Mara 0-5, E Dwyer 1-1, C Dwyer 0-3, S Fitzpatrick, C O'Shaughnessy, P Simms (f) and P Lawlor 0-1 each.	Report	M Kavanagh (0-3fs), J Kelly and T Dowling 0-5 each, J Ryan 1-2, E Bracken and M Cleary 0-2 each, P McCane 0-1 (f), P Purcell and S Bracken 0-1 each.

12 July 2026 Round 1	Borris–Kilcotton	1-29 - 2-14	Abbeyleix	Laois Hire O'Moore Park
	PJ Scully 0-9 (0-5fs, 0-1 65), J Quinlan 1-3, E Fitzpatrick 0-5, A Dunphy 0-4, S Dunphy 0-3, N Foyle and J Campion 0-2, C Kilbane 0-1.	Report	E Fennelly 0-5 (fs), E Reilly 1-2, Cormac Byrne 1-1, Colin Byrne 0-2, K Byrne 0-2, E Quinn and L Delaney 0-1.

12 July 2026 Round 1	Clough–Ballacolla	0-17 - 1-11	Rosenallis	Laois Hire O'Moore Park
	S Maher 0-4 (frees), C Dunne and S Bergin (frees) 0-3 each, A Corby 0-2, B Corby, J Corby, J Walshe, L Cleere and R Phelan 0-1 each.	Report	C Cosgrove 0-8 (0-6 frees), P Keating 1-0, J Hyland, J Lennon and D Dooley 0-1 each.

=== Round 2 ===
16 July 2026 Round 2	Ballyfin	0-16 - 3-16	Rosenallis	Laois Hire O'Moore Park
	E Duff 0-5 (fs), S Connolly 0-4, R Carroll 0-2, E Lyons, C Quinn, G Hofmeister, D Connolly and C Dunne (f) 0-1 each.	Report	C Cosgrove 0-9 (0-4fs, 0-1 65), D Dooley 1-0, P Keating 1-0, C Friel 1-0, J Lennon 0-2, FC Fennell 0-2, J Friel, J Hyland and S Kelly 0-1 each.

17 July 2026 Round 2	Ballinakill	0-21 - 1-23	Clough–Ballacolla	Laois Hire O'Moore Park
	B Duggan 0-7 (frees), C Dwyer 0-4 (0-1 free), E Dwyer, P Lawlor and G Lynch 0-2 each, R Quinlan 0-1, E Drury and P Simms 0-1 each.	Report	S Bergin 1-5 (0-4 frees), J Walshe and W Dunphy 0-4 each, J Corby 0-3, R Broderick 0-2, R Phelan, B Corby, C Hogan, M Hennessy and S Maher (free) 0-1 each.

18 July 2026 Round 2	The Harps	3-22 - 0-13	Abbeyleix	Laois Hire O'Moore Park
	Ciarán Comerford 0-9 (0-7fs), Justin Duggan 2-1, James Duggan 1-2, E Delaney and P Delaney 0-2 each, T Mahony, E Murphy (f), M Monahan, J Kennedy, R Edwards and J Brophy 0-1 each.	Report	E Fennelly 0-7 (0-6fs), E Reilly (0-1f) and Cormac Byrne 0-2 each, K Byrne and J Finlay 0-1 each.

18 July 2026 Round 2	Portlaoise	1-14 - 0-17	Borris–Kilcotton	Laois Hire O'Moore Park
	C Duggan 0-4 (fs), R Denny 0-4 (0-2fs), C Taylor 1-1, C Rigney 0-3 (f), L Conroy and B O'Reilly (f) 0-1 each.	Report	PJ Scully 0-7 (0-4fs, 0-1 65), A Dunphy 0-5 (0-4fs) J Quinlan 0-2, C Stapleton, P Tynan and S Dunphy 0-1 each.

18 July 2026 Round 2	Rathdowney–Errill	1-23 - 2-24	Camross	Laois Hire O'Moore Park
	M Kavanagh 0-11 (0-10fs, 0-1 65), P Purcell 1-1, T Dowling 0-3, J Kelly 0-4, M Cleary 0-2, J Ryan and R Bowe 0-1 each.	Report	Z Keenan 0-8 (0-7fs), M Keyes 1-4 (0-1f), C Collier 1-2, E Gaughan 0-3 (0-2fs), T Cuddy, J Cuddy and L Delaney 0-2 each, M Dowling 0-1.

=== Round 3 ===
31 July 2026 Round 3	Camross	1-19 - 1-22	Clough–Ballacolla	Laois Hire O'Moore Park
	T Keyes 1-5 (0-4 frees), E Gaughan 0-5 (0-2 frees), Z Keenan (frees), M Dowling and J Cuddy 0-2 each, L Delaney, D Delaney and C Collier 0-1 each	Report	S Maher 0-13 (0-8 frees), W Dunphy (one sideline) and J Walshe 0-3 each, M Hennessy 1-0, C Dunne 0-2, J Corby 0-1.

1 August 2026 Round 3	Ballinakill	0-21 - 2-23	Borris–Kilcotton	Laois Hire O'Moore Park
	B Duggan (frees) and C Dwyer (0-1 free) 0-4 each, S Fitzpatrick 0-3, R Quinlan and B O’Mara 0-2 each, D Doyle, E Drury, L McDonald, D Bergin, E Dwyer, and G Lynch 0-1 each.	Report	PJ Scully 1-14 (0-12 frees), A Dunphy 1-3, J Quinlan 0-3, S Dunphy 0-2, J Campion 0-1.

1 August 2026 Round 3	Rathdowney–Errill	1-18 - 1-19	Rosenallis	Laois Hire O'Moore Park
	J Kelly 0-9 (0-7 frees, 0-1 sideline), P Purcell 1-1, T Fitzpatrick 0-3 (0-2 frees), M Cleary and M Kavanagh (frees) 0-2 each, S Bracken 0-1,	Report	C Cosgrove 0-12 (0-11 frees), B Fitzpatrick 1-1, D Dooley 0-3, C Friel, J Friel and M Bennett 0-1 each.

2 August 2026 Round 3	The Harps	1-23 - 1-15	Portlaoise	Laois Hire O'Moore Park
	Ciaran Comerford 0-9 (0-7fs), E Murphy 0-3 (0-1, 0-1 65), Justin Duggan 0-4, James Duggan 1-1, J Brophy 0-3, H Whelan, R Edwards and Cody Comerford 0-1 each.	Report	C Duggan 0-8 (0-6fs), D O'Mahoney 1-1, R Denny 0-3 (0-1f), L Conroy, D Delaney and C Rigney (f) 0-1 each.

2 August 2026 Round 3	Ballyfin	0-11 - 2-22	Abbeyleix	Laois Hire O'Moore Park
	S Connolly 0-6 (0-4fs), E Lyons and E Duff 0-2 each, D Connolly 0-1.	Report	E Fennelly 0-5 (0-4fs), E Rowland 1-2 (fs), K Byrne 1-1, Cormac Byrne 0-4 (0-1f), E Reilly 0-3, S O'Donnell and J Finlay 0-2 each, C Walsh, R Coffey and L Delaney 0-1 each.

=== Round 4 ===
14 August 2026 Round 4	The Harps	0-24 - 0-11	Rosenallis	Laois Hire O'Moore Park
	Ciaran Comerford 0-10 (seven frees), E Murphy 0-4 (two frees, one 65), R Deegan 0-3, James Duggan, Justin Duggan and E Delaney 0-2 each, P Dunne 0-1.	Report	C Cosgrove 0-6 (five frees), FC Fennell 0-2, D Dooley, C Friel and D McEvoy 0-1 each.

15 August 2026 Round 4	Ballyfin	0-21 - 2-20	Ballinakill	Laois Hire O'Moore Park
	S Connolly 0-8 (0-6fs), E Lyons 0-4 (0-2fs), R Carroll 0-4, E Duff, C Quinn, A Connolly, D Connolly and C Dunne 0-1 each	Report	B Duggan 0-7 (0-5fs), S Fitzpatrick 1-4, E Dwyer 1-1, G Lynch 0-2, I Shanahan 0-2, E Drury, J Drury, C McDonagh and C Dwyer (f) 0-1 each

15 August 2026 Round 4	Borris–Kilcotton	2-27 - 5-21	Camross	Laois Hire O'Moore Park
	A Dunphy 0-10 (0-4fs), PJ Scully 0-7 (0-3fs, 0-1 65, 0-1 sideline), J Campion 1-2, J Quinlan and E Fitzpatrick 0-3 each, E Fleming 1-0 (penalty), S Dunphy and N Foyle 0-1 each	Report	T Keyes 2-4 (0-2fs, 0-1 65), J Cuddy 1-1, E Gaughan and Z Keenan (0-1f) 0-4 each, O Phelan 0-3, D Delaney 1-1, C Collier, C Cuddy, E Cuddy and T Cuddy 0-1 each.

16 August 2026 Round 4	Rathdowney–Errill	4-19 - 0-09	Portlaoise	Laois Hire O'Moore Park
	J Kelly 0-9 (0-7fs), P Purcell 2-1, T Dowling 1-3, P McCane 1-1, T Fitzpatrick and J Ryan 0-2 each, R Bowe 0-1	Report	DJ White 0-3 (0-2fs), C Rigney 0-2 (0-1 65), C McEvoy, G Bergin, C Duggan and C Taylor 0-1 each

16 August 2026 Round 4	Clough–Ballacolla	2-22 - 0-16	Abbeyleix	Laois Hire O'Moore Park
	C Dunne 2-4, S Maher 0-10 (0-6fs, 0-1 65), M Hennessy, W Dunphy, and C Brennan 0-2 each, S Bergin and J Corby 0-1 each	Report	Cormac Byrne 0-9 (0-6fs), E Reilly 0-3, Colin Byrne, C Walsh, A Lynch and E Rowland (f) 0-1 each

=== Round 5 ===
4 September 2026 Round 5	Clough–Ballacolla	5-31 - 0-12	Portlaoise	Laois Hire O'Moore Park
	S Maher 2-12 (1-0 pen, 0-3 frees, 0-2 65’s), W Dunphy and J Corby 0-6 each, C Hogan 1-1, M Hennessy and C Dunne 1-0 each, D Conway, B Corby and C Brennan 0-2 each.	Report	DJ White 0-4 (0-3 frees), C Duggan 0-3 (frees), C Rigney 0-2 (frees), G Bergin and C McEvoy 0-1 each.

6 September 2026 Round 5	Camross	4-25 - 0-22	Ballyfin	Laois Hire O'Moore Park
	E Gaughan 0-7 (three free), O Phelan 1-3, O Bennett and J Cuddy 1-2 each, M Dowling 1-1, D Drennan, C Collier, Z Keenan 0-2 (free, 65) and G Burke 0-2 each, T Cuddy, A Carroll, E Cuddy, D Palmer 0-1 each.	Report	S Connolly 0-7 (frees), E Lyons 0-4 (one free), D Connolly 0-4, A Connolly 0-3, R Carroll 0-2, C Dunne and G Dunphy 0-1 each.

6 September 2026 Round 5	Ballinakill	0-19 - 3-18	The Harps	Laois Hire O'Moore Park
	B Duggan 0-9 (0-8fs), C Dwyer (0-1f, 0-1 sideline) and E Drury 0-2 each, R Quinlan, S Fitzpatrick, G Lynch, D Doyle, B O'Mara, I Shanahan 0-1 each.	Report	J Duggan 2-4, Ciaran Comerford 0-8 (0-6fs), J Duggan 1-3, E Murphy 0-2, E Delaney 0-1.

6 September 2026 Round 5	Rathdowney–Errill	3-16 - 2-22	Abbeyleix	Laois Hire O'Moore Park
	J Kelly 0-7 (0-5fs), P Purcell 2-0, T Dowling 1-3, M Cleary 0-3, M Kavanagh 0-2 (0-1f), E Bracken 0-1.	Report	F Mahony 1-3, E Reilly 0-6 (0-2fs), Cormac Byrne 0-6 (0-1f), E Rowland 1-0 (f), Colin Byrne and E Fennelly (0-1f) 0-2 each, E Quinn and S Quinn 0-1 each.

6 September 2026 Round 5	Borris–Kilcotton	0-19 - 0-17	Rosenallis	Laois Hire O'Moore Park
	N Foyle 0-9 (frees), J Quinlan 0-6, J Campion 0-3, and D Carey 0-1.	Report	D Dooley 0-8 (0-4 frees), J Hyland 0-3, FC Fennell 0-2, C Friel, P Keating, D Hartnett and J Friel 0-1 each.

== Relegation stage ==
=== Relegation playoff ===
20 September 2026 Playoff	Ballyfin	0-15 - 0-25	Ballinakill	Laois Hire O'Moore Park
	S Connolly 0-8 (0-5fs), E Lyons and R Carroll 0-2 each, A Connolly, G Dunphy and C Culleton 0-1 each.	Report	B Duggan 0-12 (0-7fs), C McDonagh 0-4, E Drury 0-3, D Doyle and B O'Meara 0-2 each, I Shanahan and M Fleming 0-1 each.

== Knockout stage ==
=== Quarter-finals ===
20 September 2026 Quarter-final	Rosenallis	0-22 - 1-18	Abbeyleix	Laois Hire O'Moore Park
	D Dooley 0-11 (0-9 frees), C Friel 0-4, D Hartnett 0-3, J Hyland 0-2, J Friel and P Keating 0-1 each.	Report	Cormac Byrne 0-9 (0-6 frees), K Byrne 1-3, E Rowland 0-3 (frees), C Walsh, Colin Byrne and F Mahony 0-1 each

20 September 2026 Quarter-final	The Harps	2-17 - 1-16	Borris–Kilcotton	Laois Hire O'Moore Park
	Ciaran Comerford 1-6 (1-5 frees), James Duggan 0-4, E Delaney 0-3, E Murphy 0-2 (0-1 free), R Deegan and J Duggan 0-1 each.	Report	A Dunphy 0-11 (0-9 frees), J Campion 0-3, K Abraham 1-0, S Dunphy and N Coss 0-1 each

=== Semi-finals ===
4 October 2026 Semi-final	Camross	2-16 - 2-11	Rosenallis	Laois Hire O'Moore Park
	T Keyes 1-6 (0-6 frees), D Drennan 1-0, E Gaughan 0-2 (0-1 free, 0-1 65), Z Keenan 0-2 (0-1 free) and O Phelan 0-2, L Delaney 0-1, C Collier 0-1, J Cuddy 0-1 and O Bennett 0-1.	Report	D Dooley 0-8 (0-5 frees, 0-1 65), C Cosgrove 1-0 and J Lennon 1-0, C Friel 0-1, FC Fennell 0-1and D Hartnett 0-1.

4 October 2026 Semi-final	Clough–Ballacolla	2-19 - 4-16	The Harps	Laois Hire O'Moore Park
	S Maher 2-7 (1-5 frees, 1-0 pen, 0-2 65s), C Dunne 0-5, W Dunphy 0-2, A Corby 0-2 and J Walshe 0-2, R Broderick 0-1.	Report	E Delaney 3-1, C Comerford 0-7 (0-5 frees), E Murphy 1-2, H Whelan 0-3, J Duggan 0-1, R Edwards 0-1 and P Dunne 0-1.

=== Final ===
18 October 2026 Final	Camross	0-13 - 2-23	The Harps	Laois Hire O'Moore Park
	Z Keenan 0-4 (4fs), E Gaughan (1 65) and C Collier 0-2 each, J Cuddy, T Cuddy, C Cuddy, M Dowling and T Keyes 0-1 each.	Report	Ciaran Comerford 0-6 (5fs), Justin Duggan 1-3, E Murphy 0-4 (1f), James Duggan and E Delaney 0-3 each, R Deegan 1-0, H Whelan 0-2, R Edwards and P Dunne 0-1 each.

== Championship statistics ==
=== Top scorers ===
Rank	Player	Club	Tally	Total	Matches	Average
1	Ciarán Comerford	The Harps	1-62	65	8	8.12
2	Stephen Maher	Clough–Ballacolla	4-47	59	6	9.83
3	Brian Duggan	Ballinakill	1-44	47	6	7.50
4	Tomás Keyes	Camross	5-28	43	6	7.16
5	Justin Duggan	The Harps	8-17	41	8	5.12
6	P. J. Scully	Borris–Kilcotton	1-37	40	4	10.00
7	Conor Cosgrove	Rosenallis	1-35	38	5	7.60
8	Aaron Dunphy	Borris–Kilcotton	1-33	36	5	7.20
9	David Dooley	Rosenallis	1-32	35	7	5.00
10	Cormac Byrne	Abbeyleix	0-34	34	6	5.66
10	Jack Kelly	Rathdowney–Errill	0-34	34	5	6.80
