= 2019 Laois Senior Hurling Championship =

Annual hurling competition season

- Champions: Rathdowney–Errill (6th title); Paddy Purcell (captain); John Delaney (manager)
- Runners-up: Borris–Kilcotton; Joseph Campion (captain); Eoin Brislane (manager)

The 2019 Laois Senior Hurling Championship was the 126th staging of the Laois Senior Hurling Championship since its establishment by the Laois County Board in 1888.

Camross were the defending champions, however, they were beaten by Rathdowney–Errill in the semi-finals.

The final was played on 20 October 2019 at O'Moore Park in Portlaoise, between Rathdowney–Errill and Borris–Kilcotton, in what was their second meeting in the final overall. Rathdowney–Errill won the match by 0–18 to 1–09 to claim their sixth championship title overall and a first title in five years.

== Results ==
=== Semi-finals ===
6 October 2019 Semi-final	Borris–Kilcotton	0-25 - 1-15	Clough–Ballacolla	O'Moore Park

6 October 2019 Semi-final	Rathdowney–Errill	1-15 - 0-17	Camross	O'Moore Park

=== Final ===
20 October 2019 Final	Rathdowney–Errill	0-18 - 1-09	Borris–Kilcotton	O'Moore Park
