= 2022 Laois Senior Hurling Championship =

Annual hurling competition season

- Dates: 14 July - 2 October 2022
- Teams: 8
- Sponsor: Laois Shopping Centre
- Champions: Clough–Ballacolla (6th title); Stephen Maher (captain); Declan Laffan (manager)
- Runners-up: Camross; Andrew Collier (captain); David Cuddy (manager)
- Relegated: Ballinakill

Tournament statistics
- Matches played: 18
- Goals scored: 58 (3.22 per match)
- Points scored: 651 (36.17 per match)
- Top scorer(s): Stephen Maher (1-57)

The 2022 Laois Senior Hurling Championship was the 129th staging of the Laois Senior Hurling Championship since its establishment by the Laois County Board in 1888. The draw for the group stage placings took place on 24 February 2022. The championship ran from 14 July to 2 October 2022.

Clough–Ballacolla entered the championship as the defending champions.

The final was played on 2 October 2022 at MW Hire O'Moore Park in Port Laoise, between Clough–Ballacolla and Camross, in what was their third meeting in the final and a first in five years. Clough–Ballacolla won the match by 1–24 to 0–16 to claim their sixth championship title overall and a third title in succession.

Clough–Ballacolla's Stephen Maher was the championship's top scorer with 1-57.

== Team changes ==
=== To Championship ===
Promoted from the Laois Premier Intermediate Hurling Championship

- Ballinakill

=== From Championship ===
Relegated to the Laois Premier Intermediate Hurling Championship

- Abbeyleix St Lazarian's

== Group A ==
=== Group A table ===
Advanced to semi-finals Advanced to quarter-finals Advanced to relegation playoff

| Team | Matches | | | | Score | | | Pts |
| Team | Pld | W | D | L | For | Against | Diff | Pts |
|---|---|---|---|---|---|---|---|---|
| Clough–Ballacolla | 3 | 3 | 0 | 0 | 85 | 48 | 37 | 6 |
| Camross | 3 | 2 | 0 | 1 | 83 | 69 | 14 | 4 |
| Castletown | 3 | 1 | 0 | 1 | 63 | 90 | -27 | 2 |
| The Harps | 3 | 0 | 0 | 3 | 62 | 86 | -24 | 0 |

=== Group A results ===
| 14 July 2022 Round 1 | Camross | 3-21 - 3-14 | The Harps | MW Hire O'Moore Park |
| | M Dowling 2-0, D Delaney 0-6, D Mortimer 0-5, O Phelan 0-4, C Collier 1-0, G Burke 0-2, E Gaughan 0-2, A Mortimer 0-1, A Collier 0-1. | | P Duggan 2-3, P Delaney 0-5, R Saunders 1-1, M Lanigan 0-3, C Comerford 0-1, E Clancy 0-1. |

| 16 July 2022 Round 1 | Clough–Ballacolla | 3-24 - 0-13 | Castletown | MW Hire O'Moore Park |
| | S Maher 0-16, J O'Dwyer 2-0, C Dunne 1-1, S Bergin 0-4, K Mulhall 0-2, R Phelan 0-1. | | A Gaughan 0-7, R Mullaney 0-2, S Cuddy 0-1, J Gaughan 0-1, G Gaughan 0-1, M Phelan 0-1. |

| 30 July 2022 Round 2 | Castletown | 3-17 - 2-13 | The Harps | MW Hire O'Moore Park |
| | R Mullaney 2-4, B Reddin 1-3, A Gaughan 0-6, T Cuddy 0-1, E Cuddy 0-1, D Conroy 0-1, C Phelan 0-1. | | J Brophy 0-7, J Duggan 1-2, P Walsh 1-0, R Saunders 0-1, B Dunne 0-1, P Delaney 0-1, R Edwards 0-1. |

| 30 July 2022 Round 2 | Clough–Ballacolla | 1-19 - 0-15 | Camross | MW Hire O'Moore Park |
| | S Maher 0-10, W Dunphy 0-4, C Dunne 1-0, A Corby 0-2, R Broderick 0-1, S Bergin 0-1, R Phelan 0-1. | | Z Keennan 0-5, T Keyes 0-3, C Collier 0-3, M Dowling 0-2, E Gaughan 0-1, D Mortimer 0-1. |

| 13 August 2022 Round 3 | Clough–Ballacolla | 3-21 - 2-14 | The Harps | MW Hire O'Moore Park |
| | S Maher 1-7, A Corby 1-3, B Corby 1-2, C Dunne 0-3, P Brennan 0-3, R Phelan 0-1, W Dunphy 0-1. | | J Brophy 1-8, E Clancy 1-0, J Duggan 0-3, R Saunders 0-1, R Edwards 0-1, E Doheny 0-1. |

| 14 August 2022 Round 3 | Castletown | 1-21 - 4-26 | Camross | MW Hire O'Moore Park |
| | R Mullaney 0-6, A Gaughan 0-6, C Phelan 0-4, B Reddin 1-0, S Phelan 0-3, M Phelan 0-2. | | Z Keenan 1-8, D Delaney 1-5, C Collier 1-4, M Dowling 1-3, T Keyes 0-3, G Burke 0-1, D Palmer 0-1, L Delaney 0-1. |

== Group B ==
=== Group B table ===
Advanced to semi-finals Advanced to quarter-finals Advanced to relegation playoff

| Team | Matches | | | | Score | | | Pts |
| Team | Pld | W | D | L | For | Against | Diff | Pts |
|---|---|---|---|---|---|---|---|---|
| Rathdowney–Errill | 3 | 3 | 0 | 0 | 98 | 51 | 47 | 6 |
| Rosenallis | 3 | 1 | 1 | 1 | 60 | 69 | -9 | 3 |
| Borris-in-Ossory/Kilcotton | 3 | 1 | 1 | 1 | 53 | 70 | -17 | 3 |
| Ballinakill | 3 | 0 | 0 | 3 | 54 | 78 | -24 | 0 |

=== Group B results ===
| 15 July 2022 Round 1 | Rathdowney–Errill | 2-26 - 3-13 | Rosenallis | MW Hire O'Moore Park |
| | D Carroll 1-5, B McGinley 0-5, S Madden 1-1, J Ryan 0-4, E Killeen 0-3, P Purcell 0-2, S Dollard 0-2, E Bourke 0-2, J Corrigan 0-1, T Fitzpatrick 0-1. | | B Fitzpatrick 2-4, J O'Loughlin 0-3, D Callaly 0-2, D Hartnett 0-1, P Keating 0-1, D Dooley 0-1, FC Fennell 0-1. |

| 16 July 2022 Round 1 | Borris-in-Ossory/Kilcotton | 0-22 - 0-19 | Ballinakill | MW Hire O'Moore Park |
| | PJ Scully 0-7, S Dunphy 0-6, N Quinlan 0-4, C Stapleton 0-2, N Delaney 0-1, N Foyle 0-1, D Fitzpatrick 0-1. | | B Duggan 0-9, C Dwyer 0-6, L McDonald 0-1, G Lynch 0-1, E Dunne 0-1, TJ Lalor 0-1. |

| 29 July 2022 Round 2 | Rosenallis | 0-19 - 2-12 | Ballinakill | MW Hire O'Moore Park |
| | B Fitzpatrick 0-7, P Keating 0-5, J Lennon 0-4, FC Fennell 0-1, A Bowes 0-1, J O'Loughlin 0-1. | | C Dwyer 1-5, B Duggan 1-2, E Dwyer 0-3, I Shanahan 0-1, MJ Murphy 0-1. |

| 30 July 2022 Round 2 | Rathdowney–Errill | 2-23 - 0-12 | Borris-in-Ossory/Kilcotton | MW Hire O'Moore Park |
| | D Carroll 1-6, B McGinley 1-5, J Kelly 1-4, E Bourke 0-3, J Corrigan 0-2, J Ryan 0-1, S Madden 0-1, T Fitzpatrick 0-1. | | S Dunphy 0-8, E Jones 0-1, P Whelan 0-1, N Coss 0-1, E Fitzpatrick 0-1. |

| 13 August 2022 Round 3 | Rathdowney–Errill | 5-22 - 2-11 | Ballinakill | MW Hire O'Moore Park |
| | B McGinley 1-6, E Bourke 1-2, E Killeen 1-1, D Carroll 0-4, P Purcell 1-0, P McCane 1-0, J Ryan 0-3, J Corrigan 0-3, J Fitzpatrick 0-2, L O'Connell 0-1. | | C Dwyer 1-5, B Duggan 1-2, G Lynch 0-2, E Dwyer 0-1, I Shanahan 0-1. |

| 14 August 2022 Round 3 | Borris-in-Ossory/Kilcotton | 1-16 - 0-19 | Rosenallis | MW Hire O'Moore Park |
| | S Dunphy 0-6, E Fitzpatrick 1-1, N Foyle 0-2, N Coss 0-2, P Whelan 0-1, M Whelan 0-1, C Kilbane 0-1, N Quinlan 0-1, A Dunphy 0-1. | | P Keating 0-8, B Fitzpatrick 0-5, FC Fennell 0-2, R Murray 0-2, J Maher 0-1, D Hartnett 0-1. |

== Relegation stage ==
=== Playoff ===
| 28 August 2022 Playoff | The Harps | 3-18 - 1-23 (aet) | Ballinakill | MW Hire O'Moore Park |
| | J Brophy 0-8, J Duggan 1-3, P Delaney 1-2, E Clancy 1-0, C Murphy 0-2, M Lanigan 0-1, R Saunders 0-1, C Burke 0-1. | | TJ Lawlor 0-6, P Simms 1-2, C Dwyer 0-4, G Lynch 0-3, B Duggan 0-3, E Dunne 0-1, E Dwyer 0-1, I Shanahan 0-1, P Lawlor 0-1, L McDonald 0-1. |

== Knockout stage ==
=== Quarter-finals ===
| 28 August 2022 Quarter-final | Castletown | 2-15 - 1-15 | Rosenallis | MW Hire O'Moore Park |
| | R Mullaney 1-4, R Gaughan 0-5, E Cuddy 1-1, T Cuddy 0-1, B Reddin 0-1, C Phelan 0-1, C McKelvey 0-1, D Conroy 0-1. | | P Keating 0-5, J Lennon 0-4, FC Fennell 1-0, B Fitzpatrick 0-2, J O'Loughlin 0-2, D Dooley 0-1, R Murray 0-1. |

| 28 August 2022 Quarter-final | Camross | 2-20 - 0-12 | Borris-in-Ossory/Kilcotton | MW Hire O'Moore Park |
| | Z Keenan 0-9, C Collier 2-1, T Keyes 0-5, D Delaney 0-3, O Phelan 0-1, D Mortimer 0-1. | | P Whelan 0-3, S Dunphy 0-3, A Dunphy 0-3, E Fitzpatrick 0-2, C Kilbane 0-1, E Fleming 0-1. |

=== Semi-finals ===
| 18 September 2022 Semi-final | Clough–Ballacolla | 2-21 - 1-14 | Castletown | MW Hire O'Moore Park |
| | S Maher 0-13, W Dunphy 1-2, J Dwyer 1-0, S Bergin 0-2, C Dunne 0-1, P Brennan 0-1, R Broderick 0-1, T Delaney 0-1. | | A Gaughan 0-7, C Phelan 1-2, R Mullaney 0-1, M Phelan 0-1, D Conroy 0-1, A Phelan 0-1, J Gaughan 0-1. |

| 18 September 2022 Semi-final | Camross | 1-23 - 2-18 | Rathdowney–Errill | MW Hire O'Moore Park |
| | Z Keenan 0-13, D Delaney 1-3, T Keyes 0-3, C Collier 0-1, D Palmer 0-1, O Phelan 0-1, M Dowling 0-1. | | E Killeen 1-0, E Burke 1-0, B McGinley 0-3, M Kavanagh 0-3, D Carroll 0-2, R King 0-2, J Kelly 0-2, P Purcell 0-2, J Corrigan 0-1, J Ryan 0-1, J Keane 0-1, S Dollard 0-1. |

=== Final ===
| 2 October 2022 Final | Clough–Ballacolla | 1-24 - 0-16 | Camross | MW Hire O'Moore Park |
| | S Maher 0-11 (six frees, two 65s, one sideline), W Dunphy 1-4, S Bergin 0-3, J Walshe 0-2, Cillian Dunne 0-1, W Hyland 0-1, R Broderick 0-1, K Mulhall 0-1. | | Z Keenan 0-8 (all frees), G Burke 0-3, T Keyes 0-2, D Mortimer 0-2, D Gilmartin 0-1 | Referee: P Phelan (Castletown) |

== Championship statistics ==
=== Top scorers ===
Overall

| Rank | Player | Club | Tally | Total | Matches | Average |
|---|---|---|---|---|---|---|
| 1 | Stephen Maher | Clough–Ballacolla | 1-57 | 60 | 5 | 12.00 |
| 2 | Zane Keenan | Camross | 1-43 | 46 | 6 | 7.66 |
| 3 | Aaron Gaughan | Castletown | 0-31 | 31 | 5 | 6.20 |
| 4 | Ryan Mullaney | Castletown | 3-17 | 26 | 5 | 5.20 |
| 5 | Cha Dwyer | Ballinakill | 2-20 | 26 | 4 | 6.50 |
| 5 | John Brophy | The Harps | 1-23 | 26 | 4 | 6.50 |
| 7 | Brandon McGinley | Rathdowney–Errill | 2-19 | 25 | 4 | 6.25 |
| 8 | Brian Fitzpatrick | Rosenallis | 2-18 | 24 | 4 | 6.00 |
| 9 | Daniel Delaney | Camross | 2-17 | 23 | 6 | 3.83 |
| 9 | Stephen Dunphy | Borris-in-Ossory/Kilcotton | 0-23 | 23 | 4 | 5.75 |
| 9 | Dylan Carroll | Rathdowney–Errill | 2-17 | 23 | 4 | 5.75 |

In a single game

| Rank | Player | Club | Tally | Total | Opposition |
|---|---|---|---|---|---|
| 1 | Stephen Maher | Clough–Ballacolla | 0-16 | 16 | Castletown |
| 2 | Stephen Maher | Clough–Ballacolla | 0-13 | 13 | Castletown |
| 2 | Zane Keenan | Camross | 0-13 | 13 | Rathdowney–Errill |
| 4 | John Brophy | The Harps | 1-08 | 11 | Clough–Ballacolla |
| 4 | Zane Keenan | Camross | 1-08 | 11 | Castletown |
| 4 | Stephen Maher | Clough–Ballacolla | 0-11 | 11 | Camross |
| 7 | Brian Fitzpatrick | Rosenallis | 2-04 | 10 | Rathdowney–Errill |
| 7 | Ryan Mullaney | Castletown | 2-04 | 10 | The Harps |
| 7 | Stephen Maher | Clough–Ballacolla | 1-07 | 10 | The Harps |
| 7 | Stephen Maher | Clough–Ballacolla | 1-07 | 10 | Camross |
