= 2024 Laois Senior Hurling Championship =

Annual hurling competition season

- Dates: 17 July - 6 October 2024
- Teams: 8
- Sponsor: Laois Shopping Centre
- Champions: Clough–Ballacolla (7th title); Aidan Corby (captain); Willie Hyland (manager)
- Runners-up: Rathdowney–Errill; John Purcell (captain); Enda Meagher (manager)

Tournament statistics
- Matches played: 16
- Goals scored: 48 (3 per match)
- Points scored: 567 (35.44 per match)
- Top scorer(s): Ross King (1-47)

The 2024 Laois Senior Hurling Championship was the 131st staging of the Laois Senior Hurling Championship since its establishment by the Laois County Board in 1888. The draw for the group stage placings took place on 29 February 2024. The championship ran from 17 July to 6 October 2024.

Camross entered the championship as the defending champions, however, they were beaten by Clough–Ballacolla in the semi-final stage. No team was relegated as a result of the championship expanding to 10 teams in 2025.

The final was played on 6 October 2024 at Laois Hire O'Moore Park in Port Laoise, between Clough–Ballacolla and Rathdowney–Errill, in what was their second meeting in the final overall and a first meeting in 12 years. Clough–Ballacolla won the match by 2–22 to 0–22 to claim their seventh championship title overall and a first title in two years.

Rathdowney–Errill's Ross King was the championship's top scorer with 1-47.

== Team changes ==
=== To Championship ===
Promoted from the Laois Premier Intermediate Hurling Championship

- Portlaoise

=== From Championship ===
Relegated to the Laois Premier Intermediate Hurling Championship

- Borris-in-Ossory/Kilcotton

== Group A ==
=== Group A table ===
Semi-finals Quarter-finals

Team	Matches				Score			Pts
Team	Pld	W	D	L	For	Against	Diff	Pts
Clough–Ballacolla	3	3	0	0	56	37	19	6
Abbeyleix	3	2	0	1	70	78	-8	4
The Harps	3	1	0	2	71	64	7	2
Rosenallis	3	0	0	3	35	53	-18	0

=== Group A fixtures and results ===
17 July 2024 Round 1	Clough–Ballacolla	0-31 - 2-13	Abbeyleix	Páirc Shéain Uí hUidhrín
	S Maher 0-9, W Dunphy 0-4, S Bergin 0-4, A Corby 0-3, S Corby 0-3, M Hennessy 0-3, R Phelan 0-2, K Mulhall 0-1, C Hogan 0-1, E Cassin 0-1.		E Fennelly 1-6, E Rowland 1-1, E Reilly 0-2, Ciaran Byrne 0-1, Cormac Byrne 0-1, L Doyle 0-1, C Walsh 0-1.

19 July 2024 Round 1	The Harps	3-19 - 0-13	Rosenallis	LOETB Centre of Excellence
	J Duggan 3-1, M Lanigan 0-10, C Comerford 0-4, J O'Connor 0-1, C Murphy 0-1, C Brophy 0-1, E Doheny 0-1.		J Lennon 0-3, David Dooley 0-3, J Hyland 0-2, C Cosgrave 0-2, D Hartnett 0-1, Diarmuid Dooley 0-1, J O'Loughlin 0-1.

2 August 2024 Round 2	Clough–Ballacolla	1-22 - 1-15	The Harps	Laois Hire O'Moore Park
	S Maher 1-8, J Walshe 0-3, W Dunphy 0-2, S Bergin 0-2, J Corby 0-1, A Corby 0-1, M Hennessy 0-1, K Mulhall 0-1, P Brennan 0-1, R Phelan 0-1, C Dunne 0-1.		M Lanigan 1-7, C Murphy 0-2, J Duggan 0-2, E Murphy 0-1, C Brophy 0-1, C Comerford 0-1, J O'Connor 0-1.

4 August 2024 Round 2	Rosenallis	0-22 - 3-16	Abbeyleix	Laois Hire O'Moore Park
	David Dooley 0-10, C Cosgrove 0-4, J Lennon 0-4, J Hyland 0-3, FC Fennell 0-1.		E Fennelly 0-7, E Rowland 1-3, Cormac Byrne 1-1, Colin Byrne 1-1, A Carroll 0-1, E Reilly 0-1, C Walsh 0-1, Ciaran Byrne 0-1.

24 August 2024 Round 3	Clough–Ballacolla	w/o - scr.	Rosenallis	Laois Hire O'Moore Park

24 August 2024 Round 3	Abbeyleix	2-20 - 1-22	The Harps	Laois Hire O'Moore Park
	E Fennelly 0-10, C Byrne 1-4, E Rowland 1-3, C Walsh 0-2, F Mahoney 0-1.		J Duggan 1-4, M Lanigan 0-5, C Comerford 0-5, P Delaney 0-3, C Comerford 0-2, M Downey 0-1, E Doheny 0-1, J Brophy 0-1.

== Group B ==
=== Group B table ===
Semi-finals Quarter-finals

Team	Matches				Score			Pts
Team	Pld	W	D	L	For	Against	Diff	Pts
Rathdowney–Errill	3	2	1	0	100	73	27	5
Camross	3	2	0	1	66	60	6	4
Portlaoise	3	1	1	1	60	69	-9	3
Castletown	3	0	0	3	48	72	-24	0

=== Group B fixtures and results ===
18 July 2024 Round 1	Rathdowney–Errill	4-21 - 3-14	Camross	LOETB Centre of Excellence
	P Purcell 2-3, R King 0-9, E Bourke 1-2, E Killeen 1-2, P Rafter 0-2, J Ryan 0-1, T Dowling 0-1, B McGinley 0-1.		M Dowling 2-1, Z Keenan 1-4, D Palmer 0-4, R Tyrrell 0-2, D Drennan 0-2, A Mortimer 0-1.

20 July 2024 Round 1	Portlaoise	1-14 - 0-14	Castletown	LOETB Centre of Excellence
	A Bergin 0-5, C Dowling-Byrne 1-0, B Brennan 0-3, DJ White 0-2, C Rigney 0-2, D Sheehan 0-1, J Conroy 0-1.		T Cuddy 0-6, J Breen 0-3, C Doran 0-3, C Walsh 0-1, M Phelan 0-1.

3 August 2024 Round 2	Camross	1-17 - 1-13	Castletown	Laois Hire O'Moore Park
	Z Keennan 1-5, E Cuddy 0-4, D Drennan 0-3, O Phelan 0-1, C Collier 0-1, L Delaney 0-1, J Cuddy 0-1, A Mortimer 0-1.		T Cuddy 1-2, J Breen 0-3, M Phelan 0-2, S Phelan 0-2, C Doran 0-1, J Gaughan 0-1, D Conroy 0-1, G Gaughan 0-1.

3 August 2024 Round 2	Rathdowney–Errill	2-26 - 3-23	Portlaoise	Laois Hire O'Moore Park
	R King 0-13, E Killeen 2-1, B McGinley 0-4, T Dowling 0-3, E Bourke 0-1, J Ryan 0-1, P Rafter 0-1, D Carroll 0-1, P Purcell 0-1.		A Bergin 0-10, J Conroy 2-1, C Rigney 1-3, B Brennan 0-2, DJ White 0-2, E Critchley 0-2, D Sheehan 0-1, C Taylor 0-1, F Flanagan 0-1.

25 August 2024 Round 3	Rathdowney–Errill	1-32 - 2-12	Castletown	Laois Hire O'Moore Park
	R King 0-12, E Killeen 1-3, S Pearson 0-4, P Purcell 0-3, E Bourke 0-2, L O'Connell 0-2, T Dowling 0-2, J Ryan 0-1, P McCane 0-1, B McGinley 0-1, D Carroll 0-1.		T Cuddy 0-5, D Conroy 1-1, M Phelan 1-1, C Walsh 0-2, C Doran 0-2, J Phelan 0-1.

25 August 2024 Round 3	Camross	1-20 - 0-11	Portlaoise	Laois Hire O'Moore Park
	G Burke 0-4, C Collier 1-0, L Delaney 0-3, M Keyes 0-3, Z Keenan 0-3, E Cuddy 0-2, D Drennan 0-1, E Gaughan 0-1, J Cuddy 0-1, D Duggan 0-1, T Cuddy 0-1.		A Bergin 0-8, J Conroy 0-1, C Taylor 0-1, D Sheehan 0-1.

== Knockout stage ==
=== Quarter-finals ===
8 September 2024 Quarter-final	Abbeyleix	2-18 - 2-09	Portlaoise	Laois Hire O'Moore Park
	E Fennelly 0-7, Cormack Byrne 1-1, Ciaran Byrne 0-2, Colin Byrne 0-2, C Walsh 0-2, E Rowland 0-2, A Carroll 0-1, S Quinn 0-1.	Report	A Bergin 1-2, DJ White 0-4, J Conroy 1-0, C Taylor 0-2, C Rigney 0-1.

8 September 2024 Quarter-final	Camross	2-18 - 1-16	The Harps	Laois Hire O'Moore Park
	T Keyes 1-8, D Drennan 1-1, G Burke 0-3, Z Keenan 0-3, M Dowling 0-1, L Delaney 0-1, E Cuddy 0-1.	Report	C Comerford 0-7, P Delaney 1-1, J Duggan 0-2, C Flynn 0-2, C Comerford 0-1, J Brophy 0-1, E Doheny 0-1, E Murphy 0-1.

=== Semi-finals ===
22 September 2024 Semi-final	Rathdowney–Errill	1-19 - 3-10	Abbeyleix	Laois Hire O'Moore Park
	R King 1-7, T Dowling 0-3, S Pearson 0-3, E Bourke 0-1, J Ryan 0-1, P Rafter 0-1, E Killeen 0-1, P Purcell 0-1, B McGinley 0-1.	Report	E Fennelly 2-6, Colin Byrne 1-1, Cormac Byrne 0-2, L Delaney 0-1.

22 September 2024 Semi-final	Clough–Ballacolla	1-20 - 2-13	Camross	Laois Hire O'Moore Park
	S Maher 0-9, S Bergin 1-1, J Walsh 0-4, A Corby 0-2, C Dunne 0-2, W Dunphy 0-1, P Brennan 0-1.	Report	Z Keenan 1-3, T Keyes 0-5, D Drennan 1-0, E Gaughan 0-2, C Collier 0-2, O Bennett 0-1.

=== Final ===
6 October 2024 Final	Rathdowney–Errill	0-22 - 2-22	Clough–Ballacolla	Laois Hire O'Moore Park
	R King 0-06 (frees), T Dowling and P McCane 0-04 each, P Purcell 0-03 (one free), B McGinley and L O’Connell (frees) 0-02 each, E Killeen 0-01.	Report	S Maher 1-14 (0-10 frees), S Bergin 1-01, L Cleere 0-03, J Corby, A Corby, M Hennessy and R Phelan 0-01 each.	Referee: P Dunne (Colt)

== Championship statistics ==
=== Top scorers ===
Overall

Rank	Player	Club	Tally	Total	Matches	Average
1	Ross King	Rathdowney–Errill	1-47	50	5	10.00
2	Stephen Maher	Clough–Ballacolla	2-40	46	4	11.50
3	Eoghan Fennelly	Abbeyleix	3-36	45	5	9.00
4	Aaron Bergin	Portlaoise	1-25	28	4	7.00
5	Zane Keenan	Camross	3-18	27	5	5.40
6	Michael Lanigan	The Harps	1-22	25	4	6.25
7	James Duggan	The Harps	4-09	21	4	5.25
8	Eric Killeen	Rathdowney–Errill	4-08	20	5	4.00
9	Enda Rowland	Abbeyleix	3-09	18	5	3.60
9	Cormac Byrne	Abbeyleix	3-09	18	5	3.60

In a single game

Rank	Player	Club	Tally	Total	Opposition
1	Stephen Maher	Clough–Ballacolla	1-14	17	Rathdowney–Errill
2	Ross King	Rathdowney–Errill	0-13	13	Portlaoise
3	Eoghan Fennelly	Abbeyleix St Lazerians	2-06	10	Rathdowney–Errill
3	Ross King	Rathdowney–Errill	0-12	12	Castletown
5	Stephen Maher	Clough–Ballacolla	1-08	11	The Harps
5	Tomás Keyes	Camross	1-08	11	The Harps
7	James Duggan	The Harps	3-01	10	Rosenallis
7	Ross King	Rathdowney–Errill	1-07	10	Abbeyleix St Lazerians
7	Michael Lanigan	The Harps	1-07	10	Clough–Ballacolla
7	Michael Lanigan	The Harps	0-10	10	Rosenallis
7	David Dooley	Rosenallis	0-10	10	Abbeyleix
7	Aaron Bergin	Portlaoise	0-10	10	Rathdowney–Errill
7	Eoghan Fennelly	Abbeyleix St Lazerians	0-10	10	The Harps
