= 2020 Laois Senior Hurling Championship =

Annual hurling competition season

- Dates: 31 July 2020 - 14 August 2021
- Teams: 8
- Sponsor: Laois Shopping Centre
- Champions: Clough–Ballacolla (4th title); Stephen Maher (captain); Declan Laffan (manager)
- Runners-up: Borris-in-Ossory–Kilcotton; Colm Stapleton (captain); Ciaran Comerford (manager)
- Relegated: Ballinakill

The 2020 Laois Senior Hurling Championship was the 127th of the Laois Senior Hurling Championship since its establishment by the Laois County Board in 1888. The championship was scheduled to begin in April 2020, however, it was postponed indefinitely due to the impact of the COVID-19 pandemic on Gaelic games. The championship eventually began on 31 July 2020 and, after being suspended once again on 5 October 2020, eventually ended on 14 August 2021.

Rathdowney–Errill entered the championship as the defending champions, however, they failed to make it out of the group stage. Ballinakill were relegated from the championship after being beaten by Castletown in a playoff.

The final was played on 14 August 2021 at MW Hire O'Moore Park in Port Laoise, between Clough–Ballacolla and Borris-in-Ossory–Kilcotton, in what was their first ever meeting in a final. Clough–Ballacolla won the match by 1–22 to 1–17 to claim their fourth championship title overall and a first title in five years.

== Participating teams ==
| Group A | Group B |
|---|---|
| Abbeyleix | Ballinakill |
| Castletown | Borris–Kilcotton |
| Clough–Ballacolla | Camross |
| Rathdowney–Errill | Rosenallis |

== Results ==
=== Final ===
| 14 August 2021 Final | Clough–Ballacolla | 1-22 - 1-17 | Borris-in-Ossory–Kilcotton | MW Hire O'Moore Park |
| | S Maher 0-13 (0-8 frees and 0-1 & 65), R Phelan 1-3, W Dunphy 0-4, S Bergin and J Walshe 0-1 each. | | PJ Scully 1-10 (0-7 frees, 0-2 S/L cuts, 1-0 pen) A Dunphy 0-4, M Whelan, N Coss and J Campion 0-1 each. |
