= 1960 Laois Senior Hurling Championship =

Annual hurling competition season

- Champions: Borris-in-Ossory (3rd title); Christy O'Brien (captain)
- Runners-up: Portlaoise

The 1960 Laois Senior Hurling Championship was the 67th staging of the Laois Senior Hurling Championship since its establishment by the Laois County Board in 1888.

Camross were the defending champions.

The final was played on 18 September 1960 at O'Moore Park in Portlaoise, between Borris-in-Ossory and Portlaoise, in what was their first ever meeting in the final. Borris-in-Ossory won the match by 2–06 to 0–11 to claim their third championship title overall and a first title in three years.

== Results ==
=== Final ===
18 September 1960 Final	Borris-in-Ossory	2-06 - 0-11	Portlaoise	O'Moore Park
