= 1952 Laois Senior Hurling Championship =

Annual hurling competition season

- Champions: Errill (2nd title); Jimmy Murray (captain)
- Runners-up: Clonad

The 1952 Laois Senior Hurling Championship was the 59th staging of the Laois Senior Hurling Championship since its establishment by the Laois County Board in 1888.

Kyle were the defending champions.

The final was played on 21 September 1952 at O'Moore Park in Portlaoise, between Errill and Clonad, in what was their second meeting in the final overall. Errill won the match by 6–06 to 3–04 to claim their second championship title overall and a first title in 14 years.

== Results ==
=== Final ===
21 September 1952 Final	Errill	6-06 - 3-04	Clonad	O'Moore Park
