= 2015 Laois Senior Hurling Championship =

Annual hurling competition season

- Dates: 18 July – 27 September 2015
- Teams: 8
- Sponsor: Laois Shopping Centre
- Champions: Clough–Ballacolla (3rd title); Darren Maher (captain); Kevin Martin (manager)
- Runners-up: Camross; Damien Keenan (captain); Arien Delaney (manager)
- Relegated: Castletown

Tournament statistics
- Matches played: 15
- Goals scored: 20 (1.33 per match)
- Points scored: 489 (32.6 per match)
- Top scorer(s): P. J. Scully (4–46)

The 2015 Laois Senior Hurling Championship was the 122nd staging of the Laois Senior Hurling Championship since its establishment by the Laois County Board in 1888. The championship ran from 18 July to 27 September 2015.

Rathdowney–Errill were the defending champions, however, they were beaten by Clough–Ballacolla in the quarter-finals.

The final was played on 27 September 2015 at O'Moore Park in Portlaoise, between Clough–Ballacolla and Camross, in what was their first ever meeting in the final. Clough–Ballacolla won the match by 0–20 to 1–14 to claim their third championship title overall and a first title in four years.

Borris–Kilcotton's P. J. Scully was the championship's top scorer with 4–46.

== Results ==
=== Round 1A ===
18 July 2015 Round 1A	The Harps	0-15 - 2-23	Borris–Kilcotton	O'Moore Park
17:45	M Lanigan 0-7, K Freeman 0-3, B Dunne 0-2, J Prior 0-1, P Walsh 0-1, E Clancy 0-1.		PJ Scully 2-10, P Whelan 0-3, R Jones 0-3, N Foyle 0-2, J Wall 0-2, D Quinlan 0-1, M Whelan 0-1, J Campion 0-1.	Referee: B O'Reilly

18 July 2015 Round 1A	Camross	0-17 - 1-12	Clough–Ballacolla	O'Moore Park
19:30	Z Keenan 0-10, D Delaney 0-2, C Collier 0-2, D Palmer 0-1, D Gilmartin 0-1, N Holmes 0-1.		W Hyland 1-1, S Maher 0-4, D Bergin 0-4, W Dunphy 0-1, T Delaney 0-1, R Phelan 0-1.	Referee: A Stapleton

19 July 2015 Round 1A	Ballinakill	0-15 - 1-07	Castletown	O'Moore Park
17:45	C Dwyer 0-5, E Dwyer 0-2, E Jackman 0-2, TJ Lalor 0-2, Barry Dunne 0-2, MJ Murphy 0-1, D Bergin 0-1.		D Conroy 1-0, L Hegarty 0-2, R Mullaney 0-1, D Keenan 0-1, K Conroy 0-1, S Lyons 0-1, J Hooban 0-1.	Referee: K Bowe

19 July 2015 Round 1A	Rathdowney–Errill	1-21 - 0-18	Abbeyleix St Lazerian's	O'Moore Park
19:30	M Kavanagh 1-8, P Purcell 0-6, J Purcell 0-3, J Ryan 0-2, J Fitzpatrick 0-1, O Bourke 0-1.		D Peacock 0-4, E Reilly 0-4, E Fennelly 0-4, R McEvoy 0-2, E Hearns 0-1, E Rowland 0-1, D Phelan 0-1, J Bergin 0-1.	Referee: J Lalor

=== Round 2A ===
16 August 2015 Round 2A	Ballinakill	0-13 - 2-16	Camross	O'Moore Park
18:00	C Dwyer 0-5, E Dwyer 0-2, S Downey 0-1, S Dwyer 0-1, E Jackman 0-1, TJ Lalor 0-1, MJ Dunphy 0-1, Barry Dunne 0-1.		Z Keenan 0-10, D Delaney 1-2, A Mortimer 1-0, C Delaney 0-2, C Collier 0-1, D Palmer 0-1.	Referee: J Lalor

16 August 2015 Round 2A	Borris–Kilcotton	1-15 - 1-15	Rathdowney–Errill	O'Moore Park
19:30	PJ Scully 1-10, J Campion 0-2, N Foyle 0-1, A Dunhy 0-1, D Quinlan 0-1.		MKavanagh 0-4, J Purcell 0-3, L O'Connell 1-0, J Ryan 0-2, B Campion 0-2, O Bourke 0-2, A Delaney 0-1, E Meagher 0-1.	Referee: B O'Reilly

20 August 2015 Round 2A replay	Borris–Kilcotton	1-21 - 1-20	Rathdowney–Errill	O'Moore Park
19:30	PJ Scully 1-14, S Dunphy 1-0, P Whelan 0-2, A Dunphy 0-2, N Foyle 0-1, C Stapleton 0-1, R Jones 0-1.		M KAvanagh 0-8, P Purcell 0-6, J Purcell 1-2, O Bourke 0-1, J Ryan 0-1, J Fitzpatrick 0-1, T Dowling 0-1.	Referee: J Lalor

=== Round 2B ===
15 August 2015 Round 2B	Abbeyleix St Lazerian's	0-19 - 2-12	Castletown	O'Moore Park
18:00	E Fennelly 0-8, D Peacock 0-3, R Peacock 0-2, E Reilly 0-2, J Cranny 0-1, J Bergin 0-1, E Rowland 0-1.		B Reddin 1-2, S Lyons 1-1, M Phelan 0-2, R Mullaney 0-2, K Conroy 0-2, L Hegarty 0-1, C Phelan 0-1, J Hooban 0-1.	Referee: A Stapleton

15 August 2015 Round 2B	Clough–Ballacolla	0-19 - 0-11	The Harps	O'Moore Park
19:30	W Dunphy 0-4, R Phelan 0-3, S Maher 0-3, S Bergin 0-3, W Hyland 0-2, D Bergin 0-2, J Delaney 0-1.		M Lanigan 0-6, E Clancy 0-2, J Prior 0-1, J Brophy 0-1, G Dunne 0-1.	Referee: J Lalor

=== Relegation play-off ===
29 August 2015 Play-off	Castletown	0-10 - 2-19	The Harps	O'Moore Park
19:15	S Lyons 0-2, B Reddin 0-2, D Conroy 0-2, J Hoban 0-1, M Phelan 0-1, E Cuddy 0-1, P Mullaney 0-1.		M Lanigan 1-8, E Clancy 1-1, J Brophy 0-3, G Dunne 0-2, Brian Dunne 0-2, R Saunders 0-2, Barry Dunne 0-1.	Referee: J Lalor

=== Quarter-finals ===
30 August 2015 Quarter-final	Rathdowney–Errill	0-13 - 1-20	Clough–Ballacolla	O'Moore Park
17:45	M Kavanagh 0-8, R King 0-2, J Purcell 0-2, E Burke 0-1.		S Maher 0-10, W Hyland 0-4, W Dunphy 1-0, R Broderick 0-3, S Hanlon 0-2, S Bergin 0-1.	Referee: B O'Reilly

30 August 2015 Quarter-final	Ballinakill	0-20 - 0-16	Abbeyleix St Lazerian's	O'Moore Park
19:15	C Dwyer 0-11, S Dwyer 0-3, E Jackman 0-2, MJ Dunphy 0-1, B O'Mara 0-1, S Downey 0-1, E O'Dwyer 0-1.		E Fennelly 0-5, E Reilly 0-3, D Peacock 0-2, E Rowland 0-2, R McEvoy 0-1, J Bergin 0-1, D Shanahan 0-1, C Mullen 0-1.	Referee: B O'Reilly

=== Semi-finals ===
13 September 2015 Semi-final	Camross	0-19 - 1-14	Ballinakill	O'Moore Park
16:00	Z Keenan 0-8, C Collier 0-4, D Delaney 0-2, A Collier 0-2, D Dooley 0-2, C Delaney 0-1.		C Dwyer 1-9, S Dwyer 0-2, J Walsh 0-2, B O'Mara 0-1.	Referee: J Lalor

13 September 2015 Semi-final	Borris–Kilcotton	0-18 - 2-17	Clough–Ballacolla	O'Moore Park
17:40	PJ Scully 0-12, N Foyle 0-2, S Phelan 0-2, S Dunphy 0-1, A Dunphy 0-1.		S Maher 0-8, W Dunphy 1-2, W Hyland 1-2, T Delaney 0-2, R Phelan 0-1, R Broderick 0-1, S Bergin 0-1.	Referee: A Stapleton

=== Final ===
27 September 2015 Final	Camross	1-14 - 0-20	Clough–Ballacolla	O'Moore Park
	Z Keenan 0-9 (0-3f, 0-2 65), D Palmer (1-0), D Delaney (0-2), A Collier (0-2), D Gilmartin (0-1).	Report	S Maher (0-11, 0-9f, 0-1 65), W Hyland (0-4); M McEvoy (0-1), A Corby (0-1), W Dunphy (0-1), R Phelan (0-1), S Bergin (0-1).

== Championship statistics ==
=== Top scorers ===
Rank	Player	Club	Tally	Total	Matches	Average
1	P. J. Scully	Borris–Kilcotton	4-46	58	4	14.50
2	Zane Keenan	Camross	0-37	37	4	9.25
3	Stephen Maher	Clough–Ballacolla	0-36	36	5	7.20
4	Cha Dwyer	Ballinakill	1-30	33	4	8.25
5	Mark Kavanagh	Rathdowney–Errill	1-28	31	4	7.75
6	Mick Lanigan	The Harps	1-28	31	4	7.75
7	Willie Hyland	Clough–Ballacolla	2-13	19	5	3.80
8	Eoghan Fennelly	Abbeyleix	0-17	17	3	5.66
9	Willie Dunphy	Clough–Ballacolla	2-08	14	5	2.80
10	John Purcell	Rathdowney–Errill	1-10	13	4	3.25
