= 1956 Laois Senior Hurling Championship =

Annual hurling competition season

- Champions: Borris-in-Ossory (1st title); Christy O'Brien (captain)
- Runners-up: Cullohill

The 1956 Laois Senior Hurling Championship was the 63rd staging of the Laois Senior Hurling Championship since its establishment by the Laois County Board in 1888.

Cullohill were the defending champions.

The final was played on 30 September 1956 at O'Moore Park in Portlaoise, between Borris-in-Ossory and Cullohill, in what was their first ever meeting in the final. Borris-in-Ossory won the match by 2–13 to 2–06 to claim their first ever championship title.

== Results ==
=== Final ===
30 September 1956 Final	Borris-in-Ossory	2-13 - 2-06	Cullohill	O'Moore Park
