= 1924 Laois Senior Hurling Championship =

Annual hurling competition season

- Champions: Kilcotton (9th title); Jack Carroll (captain)
- Runners-up: Rathdowney; Jack Daly (captain)

The 1924 Laois Senior Hurling Championship was the 31st staging of the Laois Senior Hurling Championship since its establishment by the Laois County Board in 1888.

Kilcotton were the defending champions.

The final was played on 29 March 1925 at the County Grounds in Portlaoise, between Kilcotton and Rathdowney, in what was their seventh meeting in the final overall. Kilcotton won the match by 3–01 to 2–01 to claim their ninth championship title overall and a second consecutive title.

== Results ==
=== Final ===
29 March 1925 Final	Kilcotton	3-01 - 2-01	Rathdowney	County Grounds
