= 1930 Laois Senior Hurling Championship =

Annual hurling competition season

- Champions: Clonad (1st title)
- Runners-up: Ballygeehan

The 1930 Laois Senior Hurling Championship was the 37th staging of the Laois Senior Hurling Championship since its establishment by the Laois County Board in 1888.

Kilcotton were the defending champions.

The final was played on 28 June 1931 at O'Moore Park in Portlaoise, between Clonad and Ballygeehan, in what was their first ever meeting in the final. Clonad won the match by 5–01 to 3–01 to claim their first ever championship title.

== Results ==
=== Final ===
28 June 1931 Final	Clonad	5-01 - 3-01	Ballygeehan	O'Moore Park
