= 1909 Laois Senior Hurling Championship =

Annual hurling competition season

- Champions: Kilcotton (4th title); Jack Carroll (captain)
- Runners-up: Rathdowney; John Naughton (captain)

The 1909 Laois Senior Hurling Championship was the 16th staging of the Laois Senior Hurling Championship since its establishment by the Laois County Board in 1888.

Rathdowney were the defending champions.

The final was played on 20 March 1910 at the County Grounds in Portlaoise, between Kilcotton and Clonaslee, in what was their first ever meeting in the final. Kilcotton won the match by 2–11 to 4–04 to claim their fourth championship title overall and a first title in three years.

== Results ==
=== Final ===
20 March 1910 Final	Kilcotton	2-11 - 4-04	Clonaslee	County Grounds
