= 2021 Laois Senior Hurling Championship =

Annual hurling competition season

- Dates: 28 August - 7 November 2021
- Teams: 8
- Sponsor: Laois Shopping Centre
- Champions: Clough–Ballacolla (5th title); Stephen Maher (captain); Declan Laffan (manager)
- Runners-up: Borris-in-Ossory/Kilcotton; Colm Stapleton (captain); Ciarán Comerford (manager)
- Relegated: Abbeyleix St Lazarian's

The 2021 Laois Senior Hurling Championship was the 128th staging of the Laois Senior Hurling Championship since its establishment by the Laois County Board in 1888. The draw for the group stage placings took place on 8 July 2021. The championship ran from 28 August to 7 November 2021.

Clough–Ballacolla entered the championship as the defending champions.

The final was played on 7 November 2021 at MW Hire O'Moore Park in Port Laoise, between Clough–Ballacolla and Borris-in-Ossory/Kilcotton, in what was their second consecutive meeting in the final. Clough–Ballacolla won the match by 1–25 to 2–21 to claim their fifth championship title overall and a second title in succession.

== Team changes ==
=== To Championship ===
Promoted from the Laois Premier Intermediate Hurling Championship

- The Harps

=== From Championship ===
Relegated to the Laois Premier Intermediate Hurling Championship

- Ballinakill

== Knockout stage ==
=== Relegation playoff ===
7 October 2021 Playoff	Abbeyleix St Lazarian's	1-14 - 3-18	The Harps	MW Hire O'Moore Park

=== Quarter-finals ===
10 October 2021 Quarter-final	Borris-in-Ossory/Kilcotton	2-14 - 1-16	Rosenallis	MW Hire O'Moore Park

10 October 2021 Quarter-final	Camross	1-23 - 0-12	Castletown	MW Hire O'Moore Park

=== Semi-finals ===
24 October 2021 Semi-final	Clough–Ballacolla	0-24 - 3-13	Rathdowney–Errill	MW Hire O'Moore Park

24 October 2021 Semi-final	Borris-in-Ossory/Kilcotton	1-21 - 1-10	Camross	MW Hire O'Moore Park

=== Final ===
7 November 2021 Final	Clough–Ballacolla	1-25 - 2-21	Borris-in-Ossory/Kilcotton	MW Hire O'Moore Park
	S Maher 0-14 (0-10 frees, 0-2 65s), W Dunphy 0-5, S Bergin 1-1, A Corby and L Cleere 0-2 each, W Hyland 0-1.		PJ Scully 0-12 (0-9 frees, 0-1 S/L and 0-1 '65), D Quinlan 1-1, S Dunphy 1-1, A Dunphy 0-3, J Campion 0-2, C Stapleton 0-1, N Foyle 0-1.	Referee: J Lalor (Shanahoe)
