= 2010 Laois Senior Hurling Championship =

Annual hurling competition season

- Champions: Rathdowney–Errill (3rd title); Liam Tynan (captain); Frankie McGrath (manager)
- Runners-up: Camross; Colin Delaney (captain); Brian Whelehan (manager)

The 2010 Laois Senior Hurling Championship was the 117th staging of the Laois Senior Hurling Championship since its establishment by the Laois County Board in 1888.

Clough–Ballacolla entered the championship as the defending champions, however, they were beaten by Rathdowney–Errill in the semi-finals.

The final was played on 10 October 2010 at O'Moore Park in Port Laoise, between Rathdowney–Errill and Camross, in what was their first ever meeting in the final. Rathdowney–Errill won the match by 2–11 to 1–09 to claim their third championship title overall and a first title in two years.

== Knockout stage ==
=== Semi-finals ===
26 September 2010 Semi-final	Camross	1-13 - 2-09	The Harps	O'Moore Park

26 September 2010 Semi-final	Rathdowney–Errill	2-17 - 1-11	Clough–Ballacolla	O'Moore Park

=== Final ===
10 October 2010 Final	Rathdowney–Errill	2-11 - 1-09	Camross	O'Moore Park
