= 1910 Laois Senior Hurling Championship =

Annual hurling competition season

- Champions: Clonaslee (3rd title); John Terry Naughton (captain)
- Runners-up: Kilcotton; Jack Carroll (captain)

The 1910 Laois Senior Hurling Championship was the 17th staging of the Laois Senior Hurling Championship since its establishment by the Laois County Board in 1888.

Kilcotton were the defending champions.

The final was played on 9 April 1911 at the County Grounds in Portlaoise, between Clonaslee and Kilcotton, in what was their second consecutive meeting in the final. Clonaslee won the match by 3–02 to 3–01 to claim their third championship title overall and a first title in 19 years.

== Results ==
=== Final ===
9 April 1911 Final	Clonaslee	3-02 - 3-01	Kilcotton	County Grounds
