= 1983 Laois Senior Hurling Championship =

Annual hurling competition season

- Champions: Portlaoise (5th title); John Joe Ging (captain)
- Runners-up: Camross

The 1983 Laois Senior Hurling Championship was the 90th staging of the Laois Senior Hurling Championship since its establishment by the Laois County Board in 1888.

Portlaoise were the defending champions.

The final was played on 23 October 1983 at St Fintan's Park in Mountrath, between Portlaoise and Camross, in what was their fourth meeting in the final overall. Portlaoise won the match by 3–10 to 3–05 to claim their fifth championship title overall and a third consecutive title.

== Results ==
=== Final ===
23 October 1983 Final	Portlaoise	3-10 - 3-05	Camross	St Fintan's Park
