= 1957 Laois Senior Hurling Championship =

Annual hurling competition season

- Champions: Borris-in-Ossory (2nd title); Christy O'Brien (captain)
- Runners-up: Cuddagh

The 1957 Laois Senior Hurling Championship was the 64th staging of the Laois Senior Hurling Championship since its establishment by the Laois County Board in 1888.

Borris-in-Ossory were the defending champions.

The final was scheduled to be played on 20 October 1957 at O'Moore Park in Portlaoise, between Borris-in-Ossory and Cuddagh, however, Cuddagh refused to fulfil the fixture due to three injured players. Borris-in-Ossory were awarded the title to claim their second consecutive championship title.

== Results ==
=== Final ===
20 October 1957 Final	Borris-in-Ossory	w/o - scr.	Cuddagh	O'Moore Park
