= 2006 Laois Senior Hurling Championship =

Annual hurling competition season

- Champions: Rathdowney–Errill (1st title); Liam Wynne (captain); Paul Murphy (manager)
- Runners-up: Tinnahinch

The 2006 Laois Senior Hurling Championship was the 113th staging of the Laois Senior Hurling Championship since its establishment by the Laois County Board in 1888.

Castletown were the defending champions.

The final was played on 15 October 2006 at O'Moore Park in Portlaoise, between Rathdowney–Errill and Tinnahinch, in what was their first ever meeting in the final. Rathdowney–Errill won the match by 1–11 to 1–07 to claim their first ever championship title.

== Results ==
=== Quarter-finals ===
16 September 2006 Quarter-final	Rathdowney–Errill	2-13 - 1-12	St Fintan's, Mountrath	O'Moore Park

16 September 2006 Quarter-final	The Harps	3-08 - 0-16	Clough–Ballacolla	O'Moore Park

17 September 2006 Quarter-final	Camross	2-11 - 0-10	Castletown	O'Moore Park

17 September 2006 Quarter-final	Tinnahinch	3-11 - 2-10	Portlaoise	O'Moore Park

=== Semi-finals ===
1 October 2006 Semi-final	Tinnahinch	2-12 - 1-12	Camross	O'Moore Park

1 October 2006 Semi-final	Rathdowney–Errill	1-10 - 1-10	The Harps	O'Moore Park

8 October 2006 Semi-final replay	Rathdowney–Errill	0-17 - 2-07	The Harps	O'Moore Park

=== Final ===
15 October 2006 Final	Rathdowney–Errill	1-11 - 1-07	Tinnahinch	O'Moore Park
