= 1943 Laois Senior Hurling Championship =

Annual hurling competition season

- Champions: Portlaoise (2nd title)
- Runners-up: Rathdowney

The 1943 Laois Senior Hurling Championship was the 50th staging of the Laois Senior Hurling Championship since its establishment by the Laois County Board in 1888.

Mountrath were the defending champions.

The final was played on 26 March 1944 at O'Moore Park in Portlaoise, between Portlaoise and Rathdowney, in what was their first-ever meeting in the final. Portlaoise won the match by 4–11 to 4–03 to claim their second championship title overall and a first title in 15 years.

== Results ==
=== Final ===
26 March 1944 Final	Portlaoise	4-11 - 4-03	Rathdowney	O'Moore Park
