= 1975 Laois Senior Hurling Championship =

Annual hurling competition season

- Champions: Clonaslee (10th title); John O'Keeffe (captain)
- Runners-up: Clonad; Paddy Ging (captain)

The 1975 Laois Senior Hurling Championship was the 82nd staging of the Laois Senior Hurling Championship since its establishment by the Laois County Board in 1888.

Camross were the defending champions.

The final was played on 26 October 1975 at O'Moore Park in Portlaoise, between Clonaslee and Clonad, in what was their second meeting in the final overall. Camross won the match by 0–13 to 0–08 to claim their fourth championship title overall and a first title in 65 years.

== Results ==
=== Final ===
26 October 1975 Final	Clonaslee	0-13 - 0-08	Clonad	O'Moore Park
