= 1953 Laois Senior Hurling Championship =

Annual hurling competition season

- Champions: Clonad (9th title)
- Runners-up: Kyle

The 1953 Laois Senior Hurling Championship was the 60th staging of the Laois Senior Hurling Championship since its establishment by the Laois County Board in 1888.

Errill were the defending champions.

The final was played on 4 October 1953 at O'Moore Park in Portlaoise, between Clonad and Kyle, in what was their first ever meeting in the final. Clonad won the match by 2–14 to 2–07 to claim their ninth championship title overall and a first title in three years. The Bob O'Keeffe Cup was presented to the winners for the first time.

== Results ==
=== Final ===
4 October 1953 Final	Clonad	2-14 - 2-07	Kyle	O'Moore Park
