= 2014 Laois Senior Hurling Championship =

Annual hurling competition season

2018 Laois Senior Hurling Championship
- Teams: 8
- Sponsor: Laois Shopping Centre
- Champions: Rathdowney–Errill (5th title)
- Runners-up: Camross
- Relegated: Portlaoise

The 2014 Loais Senior Hurling Championship was the 121st staging of the Laois Senior Hurling Championship since its establishment by the Laois County Board in 1888. The championship began on 19 July 2014 and ended on 28 September 2014. Camross were the defending champions, however, they were defeated by Rathdowney–Errill on a score line of 1–20 to 0–1 in the final.

== Teams ==
All but one of the eight teams from the 2013 championship participated in the top tier of Laois hurling in 2014.

Portlaoise, who defeated Clough–Ballacolla in the final of the junior championship in 2013, availed of their right to automatic promotion to the senior championship.

Similarly, The Harps defeated Ballinakill in the 2013 senior relegation play-off, and so Ballinakill were relegated to the junior grade for 2014.

== Fixtures and results ==
=== Round 1 ===
19 July 2014 Round 1	Portlaoise	0-17 – 2-11	Camross	O'Moore Park

19 July 2014 Round 1	Rathdowney–Errill	1-18 – 1-13	Borris-in-Ossory–Kilcotton	O'Moore Park

20 July 2014 Round 1	The Harps	1-16 – 2-18	Clough–Ballacolla	O'Moore Park

20 July 2014 Round 1	Abbeyleix St Lazerian's	2-14 – 1-11	Castletown Slieve Bloom	O'Moore Park

27 July 2014 Round 1 replay	Portlaoise	1-14 – 3-10	Camross	O'Moore Park

=== Round 2A ===
16 August 2014 Round 2A	Abbeyleix St Lazerian's	0-14 – 0-19	Camross	O'Moore Park

17 August 2014 Round 2A	Clough–Ballacolla	1-15 – 1-18	Rathdowney–Errill	O'Moore Park

=== Round 2B ===
15 August 2014 Round 2B	Borris-in-Ossory–Kilcotton	0-20 – 2-19	Castletown Slieve Bloom	O'Moore Park

16 August 2014 Round 2B	The Harps	2-12 – 0-11	Portlaoise	O'Moore Park

=== Relegation play-off ===
31 August 2014 Relegation play-off	Borris-in-Ossory–Kilcotton	1-17 – 0-8	Portlaoise	O'Moore Park

=== Quarter-finals ===
30 August 2014 Quarter-final	Abbeyleix St Lazerian's	1-14 – 1-10	The Harps	O'Moore Park

30 August 2014 Quarter-final	Abbeyleix St Lazerian's	1-11 – 3-24	Clough–Ballacolla	O'Moore Park

=== Semi-finals ===
14 September 2014 Semi-final	Rathdowney–Errill	1-17 – 2-14	Abbeyleix St Lazerian's	O'Moore Park

14 September 2014 Semi-final	Camross	1-17 – 0-17	Clough–Ballacolla	O'Moore Park

21 September 2014 Semi-final replay	Rathdowney–Errill	4-19 – 3-10	Abbeyleix St Lazerian's	O'Moore Park

=== Final ===
28 September 2014 Final	Camross	0-10 – 1-20	Rathdowney–Errill	O'Moore Park
