= Ballaghmore =

Ballaghmore may refer to:

- Ballaghmore, County Laois, a small village in County Laois, Ireland
  - Ballaghmore Castle, a castle from 1480 in Ballaghmore, County Laois
- Ballaghmore (Ballymoney), a townland in County Antrim, Northern Ireland
- Ballaghmore (Dunluce), a townland in County Antrim, Northern Ireland
- Ballaghmore, County Carlow, a townland in County Carlow, Ireland
- Ballaghmore, County Fermanagh, a townland in County Fermanagh, Northern Ireland
