= 1905 Laois Senior Hurling Championship =

Annual hurling competition season

- Champions: Kilcotton (2nd title); Jack Carroll (captain)
- Runners-up: Rathdowney; Peter Daly (captain)

The 1905 Laois Senior Hurling Championship was the 12th staging of the Laois Senior Hurling Championship since its establishment by the Laois County Board in 1888.

Kilcotton were the defending champions.

The final was played on 18 March 1906 at the Clough Grounds, between Kilcotton and Rathdowney, in what was their second consecutive meeting in the final. Kilcotton won the match by 4–11 to 1–03 to claim their second consecutive championship title.

== Results ==
=== Final ===
18 March 1906 Final	Kilcotton	4-11 - 1-03	Rathdowney	Clough Grounds
