= 1955 Laois Senior Hurling Championship =

Annual hurling competition season

- Champions: Cullohill (1st title)
- Runners-up: Kyle

The 1955 Laois Senior Hurling Championship was the 62nd staging of the Laois Senior Hurling Championship since its establishment by the Laois County Board in 1888.

Clonad were the defending champions.

The final was played on 9 October 1955 at O'Moore Park in Portlaoise, between Cullohill and Kyle, in what was their first-ever meeting in the final. Cullohill won the match by 5–09 to 3–05 to claim their first-ever championship title.

== Results ==
=== Final ===
9 October 1955 Final	Cullohill	5-09 - 3-05	Kyle	O'Moore Park
