= 1906 Laois Senior Hurling Championship =

Annual hurling competition season

- Champions: Kilcotton (3rd title); Jack Carroll (captain)
- Runners-up: Camross; John Lyons (captain)

The 1906 Laois Senior Hurling Championship was the 13th staging of the Laois Senior Hurling Championship since its establishment by the Laois County Board in 1888.

Kilcotton were the defending champions.

The final was played on 14 April 1907 at the Ballacolla Grounds, between Kilcotton and Camross, in what was their first ever meeting in the final. Kilcotton won the match by 2–11 to 0–01 to claim their third consecutive championship title.

== Results ==
=== Final ===
14 April 1907 Final	Kilcotton	2-11 - 0-01	Camross	Ballacolla Grounds
