= 1929 Laois Senior Hurling Championship =

Annual hurling competition season

- Champions: Kilcotton (10th title); Jack Carroll (captain)
- Runners-up: Portlaoise

The 1929 Laois Senior Hurling Championship was the 36th staging of the Laois Senior Hurling Championship since its establishment by the Laois County Board in 1888.

Portlaoise were the defending champions.

The final was scheduled to be played on 12 January 1930 at the County Grounds in Portlaoise, between Kilcotton and Portlaoise, in what would have been their first ever meeting in the final. Portlaoise conceded a walkover and Kilcotton were awarded the match to claim their 10th championship title.

== Results ==
=== Final ===
| 12 January 1930 Final | Kilcotton | w/o - scr. | Portlaoise | County Grounds |
