= 1982 Laois Senior Hurling Championship =

Annual hurling competition season

- Champions: Portlaoise (4th title); John Joe Ging (captain)
- Runners-up: Errill

The 1982 Laois Senior Hurling Championship was the 89th staging of the Laois Senior Hurling Championship since its establishment by the Laois County Board in 1888.

Portlaoise were the defending champions.

The final was played on 12 September 1982 at O'Moore Park in Portlaoise, between Portlaoise and Errill, in what was their first ever meeting in the final. Portlaoise won the match by 2–12 to 1–08 to claim their fourth championship title overall and a second consecutive title.

== Results ==
=== Final ===
12 September 1982 Final	Portlaoise	2-12 - 1-08	Errill	O'Moore Park
