= 1904 Laois Senior Hurling Championship =

Annual hurling competition season

- Champions: Kilcotton (1st title); Jack Carroll (captain)
- Runners-up: Rathdowney; Peter Daly (captain)

The 1904 Laois Senior Hurling Championship was the 11th staging of the Laois Senior Hurling Championship since its establishment by the Laois County Board in 1888.

Rathdowney were the defending champions.

The final was played on 26 February 1905 at the Borris-in-Ossory Grounds, between Kilcotton and Rathdowney, in what was their first ever meeting in the final. Kilcotton won the match by 1–05 to 1–03 to claim their first ever championship title.

== Results ==
=== Final ===
26 February 1905 Final	Kilcotton	1-05 - 1-03	Rathdowney	Borris-in-Ossory Grounds
