= 1923 Laois Senior Hurling Championship =

Annual hurling competition season

- Champions: Kilcotton (8th title); Jack Carroll (captain)
- Runners-up: Ballacolla

The 1923 Laois Senior Hurling Championship was the 30th staging of the Laois Senior Hurling Championship since its establishment by the Laois County Board in 1888.

Rathdowney were the defending champions.

The final was played on 11 November 1923 at the County Grounds in Portlaoise, between Kilcotton and Ballacolla, in what was their first ever meeting in the final. Kilcotton won the match by 5–02 to 1–00 to claim their eighth championship title overall and a first title in three years.

== Results ==
=== Final ===
11 November 1923 Final	Kilcotton	5-02 - 1-00	Ballacolla	County Grounds
