= 1942 Laois Senior Hurling Championship =

Annual hurling competition season

- Champions: Mountrath (1st title)
- Runners-up: Clonad

The 1942 Laois Senior Hurling Championship was the 49th staging of the Laois Senior Hurling Championship since its establishment by the Laois County Board in 1888.

Rathdowney were the defending champions.

The final was played on 11 October 1942 at O'Moore Park in Portlaoise, between Mountrath and Clonad, in what was their first-ever meeting in the final. Mountrath won the match by 3–02 to 3–00 to claim their first championship title.

== Results ==
=== Final ===
11 October 1942 Final	Mountrath	3-02 - 3-00	Clonad	O'Moore Park
