= 2008 Laois Senior Hurling Championship =

Annual hurling competition season

- Champions: Rathdowney–Errill (2nd title); John Purcell (captain); Paul Murphy (manager)
- Runners-up: Portlaoise; Tommy Fitzgerald (captain); Philip Ryan (manager)

The 2008 Laois Senior Hurling Championship was the 115th staging of the Laois Senior Hurling Championship since its establishment by the Laois County Board in 1888.

Camross were the defending champions, however, they were beaten by Rathdowney–Errill in the semi-finals.

The final was played on 12 October 2008 at O'Moore Park in Portlaoise, between Rathdowney–Errill and Portlaoise, in what was their first ever meeting in the final. Rathdowney–Errill won the match by 1–19 to 2–15 to claim their second championship title overall and a first title in two years.

== Results ==
=== Semi-finals ===
28 September 2008 Semi-final	Rathdowney–Errill	2-19 - 2-13	Camross	O'Moore Park

28 September 2008 Semi-final	Portlaoise	1-20 - 2-09	Clough–Ballacolla	O'Moore Park

=== Final ===
12 October 2008 Final	Rathdowney–Errill	1-19 - 2-15	Portlaoise	O'Moore Park
