= 1951 Laois Senior Hurling Championship =

Annual hurling competition season

- Champions: Kyle (1st title)
- Runners-up: Rovers

The 1951 Laois Senior Hurling Championship was the 58th staging of the Laois Senior Hurling Championship since its establishment by the Laois County Board in 1888.

Clonad were the defending champions, however, they were beaten by Rovers in the semi-finals.

The final was played on 4 May 1951 at O'Moore Park in Portlaoise, between Kyle and Rovers, in what was their first ever meeting in the final. Kyle won the match by 3–02 to 2–02 to claim their first ever championship title.

== Results ==
=== Final ===
4 May 1952 Final	Kyle	3-02 - 2-02	Rovers	O'Moore Park
