= Willie Hyland =

Irish hurler

Personal information
- Native name: Liam Ó hAoláin (Irish)
- Born: Portlaoise, County Laois, Ireland
- Occupation: Wellness centre director

Sport
- Sport: Hurling
- Position: Left wing-forward
Club
- Years: Club
- Clough–Ballacolla
Club titles
- Laois titles: 6
College
- Years: College
- 2007-2011: Limerick Institute of Technology
College titles
- Fitzgibbon titles: 0
Inter-county
Years	County	Apps (scores)
2006-2016	Laois	21 (7-128)
Inter-county titles
- Leinster titles: 0
- All-Irelands: 0
- NHL: 0
- All Stars: 0

William Hyland (born 1988) is an Irish hurling manager and former player. He is the current manager of the Clough–Ballacolla team, having also played for the club. Hyland also lined out at various inter-county levels with Laois.

== Playing career ==
Hyland first played hurling to a high standard as a student at St Fergal's College in Rathdowney. He was part of the team that beat St Brogan's College from Bandon by two points to win the All-Ireland VS SAHC title in 2006. Hyland later played with Limerick Institute of Technology in the Fitzgibbon Cup and was red carded in a 1–17 to 2–11 defeat by University of Limerick in the 2011 final.

At club level, Hyland began his career at juvenile and underage levels Clough–Ballacolla and won a Laois MAHC title in 2006. He subsequently progressed to adult level and won six Laois SHC medals between 2009 and 2022.

Hyland first played for Laois at inter-county level during a two-year tenure with the minor team team. He later progressed to the under-21 team but ended his underage career without success. Hyland was still eligible for the minor grade when he made his senior team debut against Galway in 2006. His inter-county honours include two National League Division 2 medals. Hyland retired from inter-county hurling due to an on-going hip injury in 2016.

Hyland's performances at inter-county level resulted in his selection for the Leinster team in the Railway Cup. He was also selected for Ireland and was part of the national team that won the Shinty–Hurling International Series in 2011.

== Coaching career ==
Hyland took over as manager of the Clough–Ballacolla senior team in December 2023. He guided the team to the Laois SHC title in his first season in charge after a 2–22 to 0–22 defeat of Rathdowney–Errill.

== Honours ==
=== Player ===
St Fergal's College

- All-Ireland Vocational Schools' Senior A Hurling Championship: 2006
- Leinster Vocational Schools' Senior A Hurling Championship: 2006

Clough–Ballacolla GAA

- Laois Senior Hurling Championship: 2009, 2011, 2015, 2020, 2021, 2022
- Laois Minor A Hurling Championship: 2006

Laois

- National Hurling League Division 2: 2007, 2013

Ireland

- Shinty–Hurling International Series: 2011

=== Management ===
Clough–Ballacolla GAA

- Laois Senior Hurling Championship: 2024

Sporting positions
Preceded by Brian Campion	Laois senior hurling team captain 2012	Succeeded by Matthew Whelan
