= Charles Dwyer =

Irish hurler

Personal information
- Native name: Cathal Ó Duibhir (Irish)
- Nickname: Cha
- Born: 1994 (age 31–32) Ballinakill, County Laois, Ireland
- Occupation: Student

Sport
- Sport: Hurling
- Position: Left wing-forward
Club
- Years: Club
- Ballinakill
Club titles
- Laois titles: 0
College
- Years: College
- Carlow Institute of Technology
Inter-county*
Years	County	Apps (scores)
2013-present	Laois	12 (1-22)
Inter-county titles
- Leinster titles: 0
- All-Irelands: 0
- NHL: 0
- All Stars: 0
- *Inter County team apps and scores correct as of 11:31, 6 July 2015.

Charles "Cha" Dwyer (born 1994) is an Irish hurler who plays as a left wing-forward for the Laois senior team.

Born in Ballinakill, County Laois, Dwyer first played competitive hurling during his schooling at Castlecomer Community School. He arrived on the inter-county scene at the age of seventeen when he first linked up with the Laois minor team before later joining the under-21 side. He made his senior debut during the 2013 league. Dwyer subsequently became a regular member of the starting fifteen.

At club level, Dwyer plays with the Ballinakill GAA.

== Honours ==
=== Team ===
Castlecomer Community School

- All Ireland Association Community Comprehensive Schools Championship (1): 2011

Carlow Institute of Technology

- Higher Education GAA Senior Hurling League (1): 2014
