= 1981 Laois Senior Hurling Championship =

Annual hurling competition season

- Champions: Portlaoise (3rd title); John Joe Ging (captain); Tom Lalor (manager)
- Runners-up: Camross

The 1981 Laois Senior Hurling Championship was the 88th staging of the Laois Senior Hurling Championship since its establishment by the Laois County Board in 1888.

Camross were the defending champions.

The final was played on 1 November 1981 at O'Moore Park in Portlaoise, between Portlaoise and Camross, in what was their third meeting in the final overall. Portlaoise won the match by 2–13 to 4–05 to claim their third championship title overall and a first title in 38 years.

== Results ==
=== Final ===
1 November 1981 Final	Portlaoise	2-13 - 4-05	Camross	O'Moore Park
