= 1941 Laois Senior Hurling Championship =

Annual hurling competition season

- Champions: Rathdowney (18th title); Mick Golden (captain)
- Runners-up: Kilcotton

The 1941 Laois Senior Hurling Championship was the 48th staging of the Laois Senior Hurling Championship since its establishment by the Laois County Board in 1888.

Abbeyleix were the defending champions.

The final was played on 24 August 1941 at O'Moore Park in Portlaoise, between Rathdowney and Kilcotton, in what was their ninth meeting in the final overall. Kilcotton won the match by 3–06 to 2–02, however, the result was later overturned following an objection and Rathdowney were awarded title. It was their 18th championship title overall and a first title in five years.

== Results ==
=== Final ===
24 August 1941 Final	Rathdowney	2-02 - 3-06	Kilcotton	O'Moore Park
