= 1938 Laois Senior Hurling Championship =

Annual hurling competition season

- Champions: Errill (1st title)
- Runners-up: Rathdowney

The 1938 Laois Senior Hurling Championship was the 45th staging of the Laois Senior Hurling Championship since its establishment by the Laois County Board in 1888.

Clonad were the defending champions.

The final was played on 16 October 1938 at O'Moore Park in Portlaoise, between Errill and Rathdowney, in what was their first-ever meeting in the final. Errill won the match by 2–05 to 1–04 to claim their first-ever championship title.

== Results ==
=== Final ===
16 October 1938 Final	Errill	2-05 - 1-04	Rathdowney	O'Moore Park
