= 1920 Laois Senior Hurling Championship =

Annual hurling competition season

- Champions: Kilcotton (7th title); Jack Carroll (captain)
- Runners-up: Rathdowney; Jackie Daly (captain)

The 1920 Laois Senior Hurling Championship was the 27th staging of the Laois Senior Hurling Championship since its establishment by the Laois County Board in 1888.

Kilcotton were the defending champions.

The final was played on 24 April 1921 at the Green Road Grounds in Portlaoise, between Kilcotton and Rathdowney, in what was their fifth meeting in the final overall. Kilcotton won the match by 1–05 to 1–03 to claim their seventh championship title overall and a second consecutive title.

== Results ==
=== Final ===
| 24 April 1921 Final | Kilcotton | 1-05 - 1-03 | Rathdowmey | Green Road Grounds |
