= Ballaghmore, County Laois =

Village with castle in County Laois, Ireland

Ballaghmore An Bealach Mór
- Village
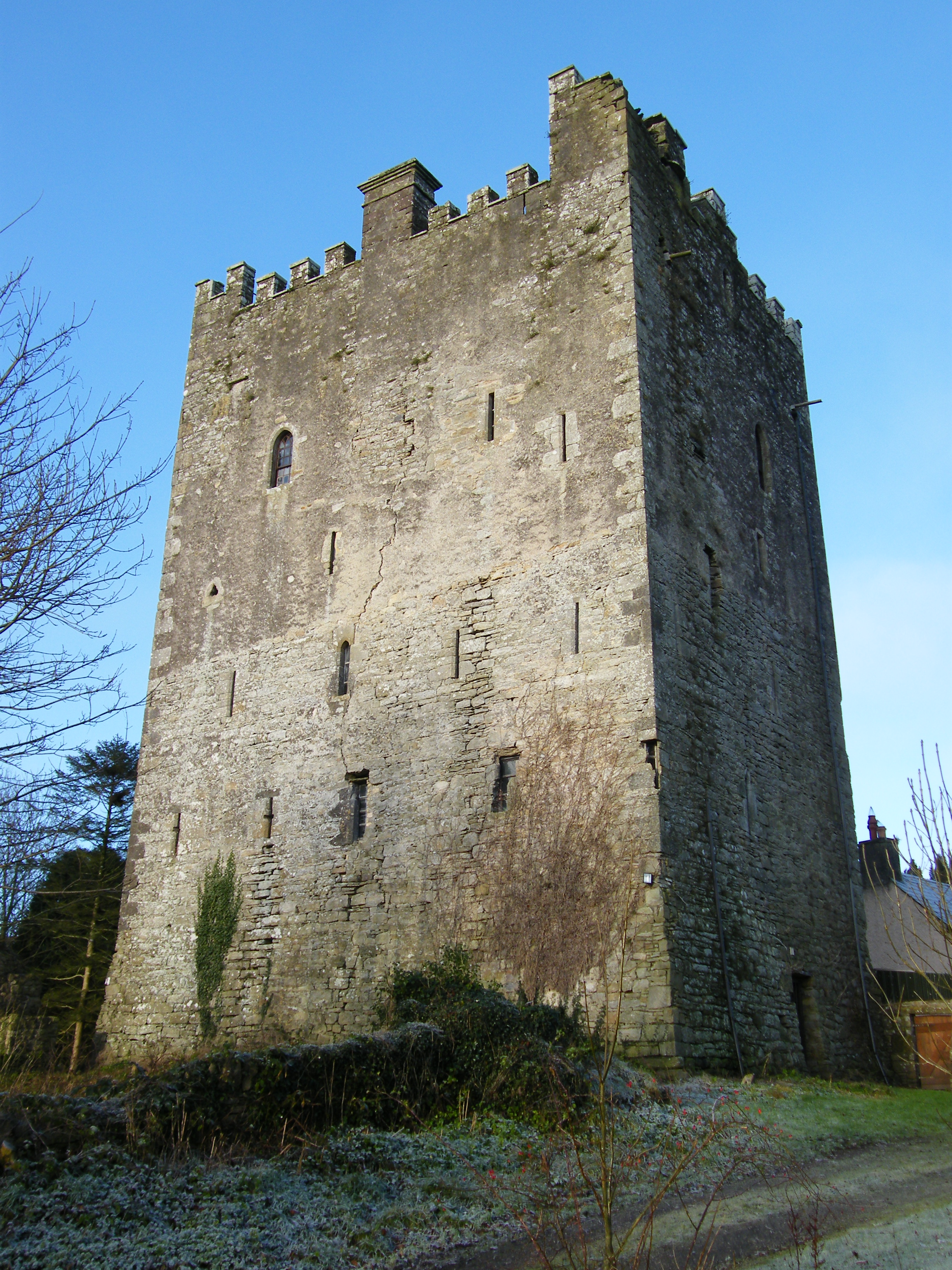
- Ballaghmore Castle

- Location in Ireland
- Coordinates: 52°57′39″N 7°41′40″W
- Country: Ireland
- Province: Leinster
- County: County Laois
- Time zone: UTC+0 (WET)
  - Summer (DST): UTC-1 (IST (WEST))

Ballaghmore (historically Bellaghmore, from Irish: an Bealach Mór, meaning 'the great way') is a small village located on the western side of County Laois, Ireland, southwest of Portlaoise. It is approximately 7 kilometres (4 mi) east of Roscrea. The village is in the civil parish of Kyle in the historic barony of Clandonagh.

== Amenities ==
The village has a hurling club (Kyle GAA) and a Roman Catholic church (Saint Molua's). Saint Molua's church was built in 1812, and extensively renovated in 1978.

The main industry in Ballaghmore is farming.

== Ballaghmore Castle ==
The village is mainly known for Ballaghmore Castle. The castle derived its name from the Bealach Mor, the ancient road to Munster on which the castle is located.

Ballaghmore Castle was built in 1480 by the Irish chieftain Mac Giolla Phádraig, translated as McGillpatrick / Son of the Servant of Patrick (nowadays often called simply Fitzpatrick). Like other castles at the time, Ballaghmore Castle was damaged by Cromwellian forces in 1647 during the Laois-Offaly Plantation.

A Mr Ely restored the castle in 1836 and found a hoard of gold on the land in the process. Ely was killed by a tenant of his, James Delaney, after a dispute regarding hunting, and never lived in the castle. The uninhabited building was used as granary and fell into disrepair until it was bought by its present owner in 1990. Of all the castles of Upper Ossory, it is the only one which is still habitable.

=== Sheela na Gig ===
A feature of Ballaghmore Castle is the Sheela na Gig which is carved in a corner stone of the outer front-facing wall. The Sheela na Gig is depicted as a half-dead woman with a contorted face and fully exposed vagina. The emphasis on the female reproduction organs in combination with her deathlike appearance is associated with the cycle of birth and death.

== See also ==
- Cullahill Castle - castle with Sheela na Gig, also in Laois
- List of towns and villages in Ireland
- Lists of castles in Ireland
