= Tinnahinch GAA =

Former Hurling club in County Laois, Ireland

Tinnahinch
- County: Laois
- Colours: Green and Red
- Grounds: Father Kehoe Park (Clonaslee)
- Coordinates: 53°09′04.50″N 7°31′31.79″W

Playing kits
Standard colours

Tinnahinch GAA was a hurling club in County Laois, Ireland.

The club was an amalgamation of Clonaslee–St Manman's and Rosenallis to play senior hurling under the name Tinnahinch.

In 2006 Tinnahinch were beaten by Rathdowney–Errill in the final of the Laois Senior Hurling Championship, a third senior final defeat for the club.

Tinnahinch played in three Laois Senior Hurling Championship Finals (2002, 2003 and 2006), won the 2009 Division 3 Féile na nGael national hurling title and won U14 and U16 A hurling and football titles. Darren Rooney, a link with the club, played hurling and football for Laois. James Young is another link with the club who played senior hurling for Laois.

== Achievements ==
- Laois Senior Hurling Championship – Runners-Up 2001, 2002, 2006
