= Eoin Brislane =

Irish hurler

Personal information
- Native name: Eoin Ó Breasláin (Irish)
- Born: 16 January 1981 (age 45) Toomevara, County Tipperary, Ireland

Sport
- Sport: Hurling
- Position: Midfield
Club
- Years: Club
- Toomevara
Club titles
- Tipperary titles: 7
- Munster titles: 2
Inter-county*
Years	County	Apps (scores)
2003-2006 2007-2008	Tipperary; Meath	3 (0-00)
Inter-county titles
- Munster titles: 0
- All-Irelands: 0
- NHL: 0
- All Stars: 0
- *Inter County team apps and scores correct as of 14:47, 3 April 2015.

Eoin Brislane (born 1981) is an Irish hurler who played as a midfielder for the Tipperary and Meath senior teams.

Born in Toomevara, County Tipperary, Brislane first played competitive hurling during his schooling at St. Joseph's College in Borrisoleigh. He arrived on the inter-county scene at the age of seventeen when he first linked up with the Tipperary minor team, before later joining the under-21 side. He made his senior debut during the 2003 league. Brislane went on to play a bit part for the team before joining the Meath senior team in 2007.

At club level Brislane is a two-time Munster medalist with Toomevara. In addition to this he has also won seven championship medals.

Throughout his career Brislane made 3 championship appearances. He retired from inter-county hurling following the conclusion of the 2008 Christy Ring Cup.

== Management ==
In retirement from playing Brislane became involved in team management and coaching. In 2009 he took over as manager of the Tipperary intermediate and senior camogie teams.

He led Monaleen to Limerick Premier Intermediate Hurling Championship and Munster Intermediate Club Hurling Championship titles in 2022, and to the All-Ireland Intermediate Hurling Championship title in January 2023.

== Honours ==
=== Team ===
Toomevara

- Tipperary Senior Club Hurling Championship (7): 1999, 2000, 2001, 2003, 2004, 2006, 2008
- Munster Senior Club Hurling Championship (2): 2004, 2006
- North Tipperary Junior C Hurling Championship (1): 2022

Tipperary

- Munster Minor Hurling Championship (1): 1999
