= Christy O'Brien =

Irish hurler (1933–2022)

Christy O’Brien
Personal information
- Native name: Criostóir Ó Briain (Irish)
- Born: 11 March 1933 Borris-in-Ossory, County Laois, Ireland
- Died: 7 March 2022 (aged 88)

Sport
- Sport: Hurling
- Position: Full-forward
Club
- Years: Club
- Borris-in-Ossory
Club titles
- Laois titles: 5
Inter-county*
Years	County	Apps (scores)
1952–1970	Laois	24 (9–24)
Inter-county titles
- Leinster titles: 0
- All-Irelands: 0
- NHL: 2 (Div2)
- *Inter County team apps and scores correct as of 20:25, 13 March 2015.

Christopher "Christy" O'Brien (11 March 1933 – 7 March 2022) was an Irish hurler who played as a full-forward for the Laois senior team.

Born in Borris-in-Ossory, County Laois, O'Brien first arrived on the inter-county scene at the age of seventeen when he first linked up with the Laois minor team. He joined the senior panel during the 1952 championship. O'Brien later became a regular member of the starting fifteen, however, he ended his playing days without any Tier1 silverware, although he did win two NHL Div2 titles - 1960 & 1965.

As a member of the Leinster inter-provincial team on a number of occasions he won three Railway Cup medals. At club level he was a five-time championship medallist with Borris-in-Ossory.

Throughout his career O'Brien made 24 championship appearances. He retired following the conclusion of the 1970 championship.

O'Brien was regarded as one of the greatest players of all-time. He has often been voted onto teams made up of the sport's greats, including at full-forward on a special Hurling Team of the Century made up of players never to have won an All-Ireland medal.

O'Brien died on 7 March 2022, at the age of 88.

== Playing career ==
=== Club ===
O’Brien played his club hurling with his local Borris-in-Ossory club and enjoyed much success. He was a key member of the club’s team when Borris-in-Ossory won its first senior county title in 1956. It was the first of three consecutive county titles for O’Brien and his club. He added two more county medals to his collection in 1960 and 1961.

=== Inter-county ===
O’Brien first came to prominence on the inter-county scene with the Laois minor hurling team. He had little success in this grade and made his senior debut in 1952. O’Brien’s senior inter-county career was a frustrating one as Laois were down the pecking order in terms of the hurling standard in Leinster. In spite of winning the provincial title in 1949, Laois never appeared in another Leinster final. O’Brien continued playing with the county until 1970.

Christy played his only Walsh Cup game in 1956 - then called the Leinster Council Senior Hurling Accident Fund Tournament - in Laois' first ever Walsh Cup game (against Kilkenny). O'Brien started in goals, but moved outfield for the second half.

He played a total of 66 times for Laois (24 SHC, 41 NHL & 1 Walsh Cup). At the time of his retirement, his 41 league appearances were only behind Harry Gray (44) and Paddy Lalor (43) in terms of Laois records.

=== Championship appearances ===
List of appearances
#	Date	Venue	Pos/No	Opponent	Score	Result	W/L	Competition
1	22 May 1955	O'Connor Park, Offaly	CB/6	Westmeath		2–3 : 4–8	L	Leinster Quarter-Final
2	22 April 1956	O'Moore Park, Laois	CB/6 (substituted off)	Offaly		5–9 : 4–5	W	Leinster Quarter-Final
3	14 April 1957	Birr, Offaly	LWB/5	Offaly	0–1	2–8 : 2–11	L	Leinster Round1
4	4 May 1958	O'Connor Park, Offaly	CF/11	Westmeath	0–2	5–8 : 4–10	W	Leinster Round1
5	26 April 1959	O'Connor Park, Offaly	FB/3	Meath		3–8 : 0–8	W	Leinster Round1
6	10 May 1959	O'Moore Park, Laois	FB/3	Offaly		6–12 : 2–7	W	Leinster Quarter-Final
7	21 June 1959	Birr, Offaly	FB/3	Kilkenny		2–4 : 8–10	L	Leinster Semi-Final
8	10 April 1960	Newbridge, Kildare	FB/3	Meath		3–9 : 2–5	W	Leinster Round1
9	16 April 1961	O'Connor Park, Offaly	CB/6	Westmeath	0–1	4–5 : 3–8	D	Leinster Round1
10	30 April 1961	Birr, Offaly	CB/6	Westmeath		2–8 : 2–9	L	Leinster Round1 replay
11	15 April 1962	O'Moore Park, Laois	FB/3	Offaly		5–8 : 2–1	W	Leinster Round1
12	29 April 1962	O'Connor Park, Offaly	FB/3	Westmeath		4–5 : 4–3	W	Leinster Quarter-Final
13	8 July 1962	Croke Park, Dublin	FB/3	Wexford		3–6 : 5–14	L	Leinster Semi-Final
14	10 April 1964	Nowlan Park, Kilkenny	FB/3	Carlow		2–9 : 4–12	L	Leinster Round1
15	23 April 1965	O'Connor Park, Offaly	CF/11	Westmeath	2–2	5–6 : 2–5	W	Leinster Round1
16	13 June 1965	Birr, Offaly	CF/11	Offaly	1–5	2–14 : 2–9	W	Leinster Quarter-Final
17	11 July 1965	Croke Park, Dublin	CF/11	Wexford	1–1	2–6 : 1–15	L	Leinster Semi-Final
18	15 May 1966	Dr. Cullen Park, Carlow	CF/11	Carlow	1–2	1–11 : 1–16	L	Leinster Round1
19	21 May 1967	O'Connor Park, Offaly	CF/11	Westmeath	1–6	5–11 : 4–9	W	Leinster Quarter-Final
20	25 June 1967	Nowlan Park, Kilkenny	CF/11	Wexford	0–1	1–6 : 6–10	L	Leinster Semi-Final
21	5 May 1968	O'Connor Park, Offaly	FF/14	Westmeath	1–3	1–10 : 3–7	L	Leinster Round1
23	25 May 1969	O'Connor Park, Offaly	RCB/4	Westmeath		5–12 : 0–1	W	Leinster Round1
23	15 June 1969	O'Moore Park, Laois	RCB/4	Offaly	2–0	2–5 : 8–10	L	Leinster Quarter-Final
24	24 May 1970	Birr, Offaly	(substituted on) RCF/15	Offaly		2–9 : 2–15	L	Leinster Quarter-Final

=== Inter-provincial ===
O’Brien also lined out with Leinster in the inter-provincial hurling competition. He won his first Railway Cup medal in 1962 as Leinster defeated Munster. O’Brien won further Railway Cup medals in 1964 and 1965.

== Honours ==
=== Player ===
Borris-in-Ossory

- Laois Senior Hurling Championship (5): 1956, 1957, 1960, 1961, 1972

Leinster

- Railway Cup (3): 1962, 1964, 1965
- Leinster Hall of Fame 2019
