= 1928 Laois Senior Hurling Championship =

Annual hurling competition season

- Champions: Portlaoise (1st title)
- Runners-up: Clonad

The 1928 Laois Senior Hurling Championship was the 35th staging of the Laois Senior Hurling Championship since its establishment by the Laois County Board in 1888.

Abbeyleix were the defending champions.

The final was played on 28 October 1928 at the Portlaoise Grounds, between Portlaoise and Clonad, in what was their first-ever meeting in the final. Portlaoise won the match by 0–04 to 1–00 to claim their first-ever championship title.

== Results ==
=== Final ===
28 October 1928 Final	Portlaoise	0-04 - 1-00	Clonad	Portlaoise Grounds
