= Clonaslee–St Manman's GAA =

GAA club in Clonaslee, County Laois, Ireland

Clonaslee–St Manman's
- Founded: 1888
- County: Laois
- Colours: Green and White (football); Red and White (hurling)
- Grounds: Father Kehoe Park
- Coordinates: 53°09′04.50″N 7°31′31.79″W

Playing kits
football	hurling

Senior Club Championships
	All Ireland	Leinster champions	Laois champions
Hurling:	-	-	3

Clonaslee St Manman's GAA is a Gaelic Athletic Association hurling and Gaelic football club in the village of Clonaslee, County Laois, Ireland.

The club colours are green, white and red (differ between green and white or red and white or sometimes green/red/white depending on whether it is hurling or football.

== History ==
Clonaslee GAA club catered for football and hurling until 1974, when St Manman's Gaelic Football Club was founded and catered exclusively for football. St Manman's reached the 1977 Laois Junior Football Championships final, losing to Portlaoise.

In 2001, Clonaslee Hurling Club amalgamated with St Manman's Football Club.

In 1999, Clonaslee–St Manman's amalgamated with Rosenallis forming a Gaels(joint team at senior that allows clubs to have separate junior teams) Senior hurling.They also amalgamated at underage in hurling and football. This team was named Tinnahinch after the barony of Tinnahinch which includes the civil parishes of Kilmanman, Reary and Rosenallis. Tinnahinch competed in 3 Senior Hurling finals in 2002, 2003 and 2006. In 2009, they won the Division 3 Féile na nGael (U14 Hurling) national hurling title.

At adult level, this was a Gaels team which meant that both Clonaslee and Rosenallis could have their own separate Junior teams.

== Juvenile Setup ==
At underage Clonaslee fields hurling and football teams on its own up to u13, at u15 and u17 they amalgamate with Rosenallis to form Clonaslee/Rosenallis.

== Achievements ==
=== Hurling ===
- Laois Senior Hurling Championship: (4) 1890, 1891, 1910, and 1975
- North Laois Senior Hurling Championship (1) 1974
- Laois Intermediate Hurling Championship 1936, 1943, 1955, 1962, 1969, 1982, 1987, 1997
- Laois Junior Hurling Championship: in 1933, 1968, 1978, 1985(B), 2002(B)
- Laois Under-21 B Hurling Championship (1) 1993
- Laois Minor Hurling Championship Finalists 1975

=== Football ===
Clonaslee–St Manman's or St Manman's have won the following football county titles;

- Laois Intermediate Football Championship: (6) 1981, 1998, 2002, 2009, 2015, 2020
- Laois Junior Football Championships: 1978, 1997
- Laois Junior C Football Championship: 2007 2023
- Laois Under 21 B Football Championship: 1999, 2006, 2007, 2009 (last three as Tinnahinch)
- Laois All-County Football League Div. 2: 1981, 1987, 1990, 2002, 2019
- Laois All-County Football League Div. 3: 1998 2024
- Laois All-County Football League Div. 5: 2016

Division 6 2024 Division 7 2023

== Notable players ==
Darren Rooney, a former club member, represented Laois at senior in both hurling and football.

Mark and Declan-brothers of Darren Rooney also played hurling and football for Laois.

James Young is also a former Laois senior hurler.
