= Laois Senior Hurling Championship =

Annual hurling competition

- Current season or competition: 2026 Laois Senior Hurling Championship
- Irish: Craobh Sinsir Iomáint Laoise
- Code: Hurling
- Founded: 1888
- Region: Laois (GAA)
- Trophy: Bob O'Keefe
- No. of teams: 10
- Title holders: The Harps (1st title)
- Most titles: Camross (27 titles)
- Sponsors: Laois Shopping Centre
- Official website: https://www.laoisgaa.ie

The Laois Senior Hurling Championship is an annual hurling competition contested by top-tier Laois GAA clubs. The Laois County Board of the Gaelic Athletic Association has organised it since 1888.

The Harps are the title holders, defeating Camross by 2-23 to 0-13 in the 2026 final.

== Honours ==
The trophy presented to the winners is the Bob O'Keefe Cup.

The winners of the Laois Senior Championship qualify to represent their county in the Leinster Senior Club Hurling Championship. They often do well there and Clough–Ballacolla were in the 2021 Leinster Final after winning the Laois Senior Hurling Championship. The winners can, in turn, go on to play in the All-Ireland Senior Club Hurling Championship.

== Teams ==
=== 2026 teams ===
The 10 teams competing in the 2026 Laois Senior Hurling Championship were:

Club	Location	Championship titles	Last championship title
Abbeyleix	Abbeyleix	8	1949
Ballinakill	Ballinakill	0	—
Ballyfin	Ballyfin	0	—
Borris-in-Ossory–Kilcotton	Borris-in-Ossory	1	2016
Camross	Coolrain	27	2023
Clough–Ballacolla	Clough and Ballacolla	13	2025
Portlaoise	Portlaoise	11	2004
Rathdowney–Errill	Rathdowney and Errill	6	2019
Rosenallis	Rosenallis	0	—
The Harps	Cullohill and Durrow	1	2026

== List of finals ==
(r) = replay

Year	Winners		Runners-up		
Year	Club	Score	Club	Score	Winning captain
1888	Rathdowney	2-02	Knockaroo	0-01	
1889	Rathdowney	3-05	Skierke	0-00	
1890	Clonaslee	1-02	Rathdowney	1-00	
1891	Clonaslee	w/o	Aghaboe	scr	
1892–1896	No competition				
1897	Harristown	0-08	Rathdowney	1-01	
1898	Rathdowney	2-10	Ballacolla	0-01	
1899	Rathdowney	1-06 (on obj)	Knockaroo	1-11 (on obj)	
1900	No competition				
1901	Rathdowney				
1902	Rathdowney				
1903	Rathdowney				
1904	Kilcotton	1-05	Rathdowney	1-03	
1905	Kilcotton	4-11	Rathdowney	1-03	
1906	Kilcotton	2-11	Camross	0-01	
1907	Rathdowney	4-10	Ballacolla	2-09	
1908	Rathdowney	2-11	Clonaslee	1-13	
1909	Kilcotton	2-11	Clonaslee	4-04	
1910	Clonaslee	3-02	Kilcotton	3-01	
1911	Rathdowney	7-01	Clonaslee	0-00	
1912	Rathdowney	4-02	Kilcotton	1-02	
1913	Kilcotton	3-03, 3-02 (r), 3-02 (r2)	Rathdowney	4-00, 3-02 (r), 2-01 (r2)	
1914	Ballygeehan	0-09, 3-02 (r)	Kilcotton	0-09, 2-01 (r)	
1915	Ballygeehan	5-03	Kilcotton	4-05	
1916	Ballygeehan	4-04	Rathdowney	2-00	
1917	Ballygeehan	3-00	Kilcotton	2-02	
1918	Ballygeehan	3-00	Rathdowney	0-00	
1919	Kilcotton	4-01	Ballygeehan	0-01	
1920	Kilcotton	1-05	Rathdowney	1-03	
1921	Rathdowney	3-00	Kilcotton	1-03	
1922	Rathdowney	4-03	Portlaoise	2-01	
1923	Kilcotton	5-02	Ballacolla	1-00	
1924	Kilcotton	3-01	Rathdowney	2-01	
1925	Rathdowney	3-03	Clonad	2-01	
1926	Rathdowney	6-01	Ballacolla	2-00	
1927	Abbeyleix	6-03	Rathdowney	3-02	
1928	Portlaoise	0-04	Clonad	1-00	
1929	Kilcotton	w/o	Portlaoise	scr	
1930	Clonad	5-01	Ballygeehan	3-01	
1931	Rathdowney	2-03	Clonad	1-04	
1932	Abbeyleix	2-04	Clonad	1-02	
1933	Clonad	5-03	Rathdowney	0-02	
1934	Abbeyleix	2-05	Clonad	2-03	
1935	Clonad	7-03	Rathdowney	1-05	
1936	Rathdowney	6-04	Kilcotton	1-05	
1937	Clonad	2-07	Abbeyleix	2-01	
1938	Errill	2-05	Rathdowney	1-04	
1939	Abbeyleix	2-09	Errill	1-03	
1940	Abbeyleix	2-03	Kilcotton	0-03	
1941	Rathdowney	2-02 (on obj)	Kilcotton	3-06 (on obj)	
1942	Mountrath	3-02	Clonad	3-00	
1943	Portlaoise	4-11	Rathdowney	4-03	
1944	Abbeyleix	2-09	Kilcotton	0-03	
1945	Abbeyleix	5-05	Camross	1-02	
1946	Clonad	3-04	Abbeyleix	2-03	
1947	Clonad	3-08	Abbeyleix	2-04	
1948	Clonad	2-06	Abbeyleix	0-03	
1949	Abbeyleix	7-03	Clonad	5-03	
1950	Clonad	3-13	Errill	1-05	Pat Norton
1951	Kyle	3-02	Rovers	2-02	Michael Rigney
1952	Errill	6-06	Clonad	3-04	Jimmy Murray
1953	Clonad	2-14	Kyle	2-07	Andy Dunne
1954	Clonad	1-09	Errill	0-04	Andy Dunne
1955	Cullohill	5-09	Kyle	3-05	Lar Dunphy
1956	Borris-in-Ossory	2-13	Cullohill	2-06	Christy O'Brien
1957	Borris-in-Ossory	w/o	Cuddagh	scr	Christy O'Brien
1958	Clonad	1-09, 3-04 (r)	Borris-in-Ossory	2-06, 1-09 (r)	Andy Dunne
1959	Camross	2-05	Cuddagh	3-01	Fintan Lalor
1960	Borris-in-Ossory	2-06	Portlaoise	0-11	Christy O'Brien
1961	Borris-in-Ossory	3-11	Cuddagh	0-04	Christy O'Brien
1962	Clonad	1-08	Borris-in-Ossory	0-05	Jimmy Fennell
1963	Camross	2-09	St Canice's	2-06	Fintan Lalor
1964	Cullohill	4-04	Camross	4-03	Mt. (Mog) O'Mahoney
1965	Camross	3-10	St Canice's	3-06	Tim Cuddy
1966	Camross	5-07	Rathdowney	2-04	Tim Cuddy
1967	Camross	5-04	Clonad	3-04	Tim Cuddy
1968	Camross	5-13	Cullohill	2-05	Ger Cuddy
1969	Camross	3-13	Rathdowney	2-05	Ger Cuddy
1970	Clonad	2-09	Clonaslee	2-06	George Conroy
1971	Camross	4-10	Clonad	3-08	Jimmy Lyons
1972	Borris-in-Ossory	4-06	Ballyfin	2-06	Brendan Dollard
1973	Camross	5-13	Borris-in-Ossory	0-14	John Carroll
1974	Camross	1-15	Clonaslee	0-05	Christy Donovan
1975	Clonaslee	0-13	Clonad	0-08	John O'Keefe
1976	Camross	1-13	Clonaslee	1-09	Martin Cuddy
1977	Camross	2-14	Portlaoise	0-05	Paddy Dowling
1978	Camross	2-09	Borris-in-Ossory	0-05	Sean Cuddy
1979	Camross	3-09	Ballinakill	1-07	Michael Carroll
1980	Camross	3-04	Portlaoise	1-08	Richard Maloney
1981	Portlaoise	2-13	Camross	4-05	John Joe Ging
1982	Portlaoise	2-12	Errill	1-08	John Joe Ging
1983	Portlaoise	3-10	Camross	3-05	John Joe Ging
1984	Portlaoise	1-08, 2-14 (r)	The Harps	2-05, 1-07 (r)	John Joe Ging
1985	Camross	1-05	Portlaoise	0-07	PJ Cuddy
1986	Camross	4-09	Errill	2-14	Joe Doran
1987	Portlaoise	2-13	Clonad	1-05	Sean Bergin
1988	Camross	1-13	Portlaoise	0-10	Alo Delaney
1989	Portlaoise	1-09, 0-12 (r)	Camross	2-06, 1-04 (r)	John Bohane
1990	Camross	2-13	Portlaoise	1-09	Pat Carroll
1991	Portlaoise	1-14	Clonad	0-07	Seamus Plunkett
1992	Clonad	0-16	Portlaoise	2-07	Pat Norton
1993	Camross	1-13, 1-13 (r)	Portlaoise	2-10, 2-09 (r)	Fintan Lalor
1994	Camross	2-08	Clonad	0-03	Tom Delaney
1995	Castletown	1-12	Portlaoise	0-11	John O' Suillivan
1996	Camross	0-15	Castletown	1-05	Matt Collier
1997	Castletown	3-14	The Harps	2-09	Eamonn Kirwan
1998	Portlaoise	0-13	The Harps	0-11	Niall Rigne
1999	Castletown	2-06	Portlaoise	1-06	John Lyons
2000	Castletown	3-10	Camross	2-05	Pat Phelan
2001	Castletown	2-19	Tinnahinch	1-08	Fionan O'Suillivan
2002	Castletown	4-09	Tinnahinch	2-04	Paul Cuddy
2003	Castletown	2-12	Portlaoise	1-11	David Cuddy
2004	Portlaoise	2-08	Castletown	0-07	Joe Phelan
2005	Castletown	0-13, 1-08 (r)	Camross	1-10, 0-10 (r)	Robert Delaney
2006	Rathdowney–Errill	1-11	Tinnahinch	1-07	Liam Wynne
2007	Camross	5-09	Portlaoise	2-11	Fran Hogan
2008	Rathdowney–Errill	1-19	Portlaoise	2-15	John Purcell
2009	Clough–Ballacolla	2-13	Portlaoise	1-10	Mick McEvoy
2010	Rathdowney–Errill	2-11	Camross	1-09	Liam Tynan
2011	Clough–Ballacolla	1-10	Portlaoise	0-11	John A. Delaney
2012	Rathdowney–Errill	1-11, 0-17 (r)	Clough–Ballacolla	2-08, 0-14 (r)	Shane Dollard
2013	Camross	2-12	Borris-in-Ossory–Kilcotton	1-12	Tomás Burke
2014	Rathdowney–Errill	1-20	Camross	0-10	Alan Delaney
2015	Clough–Ballacolla	0-20	Camross	1-14	Darren Maher
2016	Borris-in-Ossory–Kilcotton	2-26, 1-18 (r)	Rathdowney–Errill	2-26, 2-10 (r)	Brian Stapleton
2017	Camross	3-14	Clough–Ballacolla	1-19	Joe Phelan & Zane Keenan
2018	Camross	2-15	Rathdowney–Errill	0-19	Niall Homes
2019	Rathdowney–Errill	0-17	Borris-in-Ossory–Kilcotton	1-09	Patrick Purcell
2020	Clough–Ballacolla	1-22	Borris-in-Ossory–Kilcotton	1-17	Stephen Maher
2021	Clough–Ballacolla	1-25	Borris-in-Ossory–Kilcotton	2-21	Stephen Maher
2022	Clough–Ballacolla	1-24	Camross	0-16	Stephen Maher
2023	Camross	4-18	Abbeyleix St. Lazerian's	0-14	Darragh Duggan
2024	Clough–Ballacolla	2-22	Rathdowney–Errill	0-22	Aidan Corby
2025	Clough–Ballacolla	2-21	Camross	2-15	Aidan Corby
2026	The Harps	2-23	Camross	0-13	Padraic Dunne

== Roll of honour ==
#	Club	Wins	Years won
1	Camross	27	1959, 1963, 1965, 1966, 1967, 1968, 1969, 1971, 1973, 1974, 1976, 1977, 1978, 1979, 1980, 1985, 1986, 1988, 1990, 1993, 1994, 1996, 2007, 2013, 2017, 2018, 2023
2	Rathdowney	18	1888, 1889, 1898, 1899, 1901, 1902, 1903, 1907, 1908, 1911, 1912, 1921, 1922, 1925, 1926, 1931, 1936, 1941
3	Clonad	14	1930, 1933, 1935, 1937, 1946, 1947, 1948, 1950, 1953, 1954, 1958, 1962, 1970, 1992
4	Clough–Ballacolla (incl. Ballygeehan)	13	1914, 1915, 1916, 1917, 1918, 2009, 2011, 2015, 2020, 2021, 2022, 2024, 2025
5	Portlaoise	11	1928, 1943, 1981, 1982, 1983, 1984, 1987, 1989, 1991, 1998, 2004
6	Kilcotton	10	1904, 1905, 1906, 1909, 1913, 1919, 1920, 1923, 1924, 1929
7	Castletown	8	1995, 1997, 1999, 2000, 2001, 2002, 2003, 2005
7	Abbeyleix	8	1927, 1932, 1934, 1939, 1940, 1944, 1945, 1949
9	Rathdowney–Errill	6	2006, 2008, 2010, 2012, 2014, 2019
10	Borris-in-Ossory	5	1956, 1957, 1960, 1961, 1972
11	Clonaslee	4	1890, 1891, 1910, 1975
12	Cullohill	2	1955, 1964
12	Errill	2	1938, 1952
14	Kyle	1	1951
14	Harristown	1	1897
14	Mountrath	1	1942
14	Borris-in-Ossory–Kilcotton	1	2016
14	The Harps	1	2026

== Records and statistics ==
=== Finals ===
- Most wins:
  - 27 Camross
- Most consecutive wins:
  - 5 Ballygeehan (1914–18), Camross (1965–69), Camross (1976–80) & Castletown (1999–2003)
- Most defeats:
  - 17 Portlaoise
- Most consecutive defeats:
  - 3 Abbeyleix (1946–48), Portlaoise (2007–09) & Borris-in-Ossory–Kilcotton (2019–21)
- Most appearances:
  - 37 Camross
- Most appearances without a win:
  - 4 Ballacolla (1898-1907-1923-1926)
- Highest scoring match:
  - 64 points (2016) Borris-in-Ossory–Kilcotton 2-26 Rathdowney-Errill 2-26 (possible All Ireland record for 60-minute county SHC final)
- Lowest scoring match:
  - 7 points (1928) Portlaoise 0-7 Clonad 1-0
- Biggest winning margin:
  - 22 points (1911) Rathdowney 7-1 Clonaslee 0-0
- Highest scoring teams:
  - 32 points (2016) Borris-in-Ossory–Kilcotton & Rathdowney-Errill
- Highest scoring winning team:
  - 30 points (2023) Camross
- Highest scoring losing team:
  - 27 points (2021) Borris-in-Ossory–Kilcotton GAA
- Most goals match:
  - 12 (1949) Abbeyleix 7-3 Clonad 5-3
- Fewest goals match:
  - 0 (1914, 1975, 1998 & 2012d)
- Most goals team:
  - 7 (1935) Clonad & (1949) Abbeyleix
- Most goals losing team:
  - 5 (1949) Clonad
- Trivia:
  - 10 finals have ended in draws
  - 4 finals have been goalless (1914-1975-1998-2012r)
  - 20 finals have occurred where the losing team scored more goals than the winning team (last: 2019)
  - 3 finals have occurred where the winner scored two goals fewer than the losing team (1909-1981-1992)
  - 23 finals have occurred where there were more goals than points (last: 1964)

=== Teams ===
==== By decade ====
The most successful team of each decade, judged by number of Laois Senior Hurling Championship titles, is as follows:

- 1880s: 2 for Rathdowney (1888–89)
- 1890s: 2 each for Clonaslee (1890–91) and Rathdowney (1898–99)
- 1900s: 5 for Rathdowney (1901-02-03-07-08)
- 1910s: 5 for Ballygeehan (1914-15-16-17-18)
- 1920s: 4 for Rathdowney (1921-22-25-26)
- 1930s: 4 for Clonad (1930-33-35-37)
- 1940s: 4 for Abbeyleix (1940-44-45-49)
- 1950s: 4 for Clonad (1950-53-54-58)
- 1960s: 6 for Camross (1963-65-66-67-68-69)
- 1970s: 7 for Camross (1971-73-74-76-77-78-79)
- 1980s: 6 for Portlaoise (1981-82-83-84-87-89)
- 1990s: 4 for Camross (1990-93-94-96)
- 2000s: 5 for Castletown (2000-01-02-03-05)
- 2010s: 4 for Rathdowney–Errill (2010-12-14-19)
- 2020s: 5 for Clough-Ballacolla (2020-21-22-24-25)

==== Gaps ====
Top ten longest gaps between successive championship titles:

- 91 years: Clough–Ballacolla (1918–2009) [as Ballygeehan in 1918]
- 65 years: Clonaslee (1910–1975)
- 38 years: Portlaoise (1943–1981)
- 22 years: Clonad (1970–1992)
- 19 years: Clonaslee (1891–1910)
- 15 years: Portlaoise (1928–1943)
- 14 years: Errill (1938–1952)
- 11 years: Borris-in-Ossory (1961–1972)
- 11 years: Camross (1996–2007)
- 09 years: Rathdowney (1889–1898)
- 09 years: Rathdowney (1912–1921)
- 09 years: Clonad (1937–1946)
- 09 years: Cullohill (1955–1964)

=== Starts (first 1–10 finals) ===
==== Best ====
- 1 final : (1-0) Rathdowney (1888), Clonaslee (1890), Harristown (1897), Ballygeehan (1914), Abbeyleix (1927), Mountrath (1942), Kyle (1951, Cullohill (1955), Borris-in-Ossory (1956), Castletown (1995), Rathdowney–Errill (2006)
- 2 finals: (2-0) Rathdowney (1889), Clonaslee (1891), Ballygeehan (1915), Abbeyleix (1932), Borris-in-Ossory (1957), Rathdowney-Errill (2008)
- 3 finals: (3-0) Ballygeehan (1916), Abbeyleix (1934), Rathdowney-Errill (2010)
- 4 finals: (4-0) Ballygeehan (1917), Rathdowney–Errill (2012)
- 5 finals: (5-0) Ballygeehan (1918), Rathdowney–Errill (2014)
- 6 finals: (5-1) (Ballygeehan (1919), Abbeyleix (1940), Castletown (2001), Rathdowney–Errill (2016)
- 7 finals: (6-1) Abbeyleix (1944), Castletown (2002)
- 8 finals: (7-1) Abbeyleix (1945), Castletown (2003)
- 9 finals: (7-2) Rathdowney (1903), Abbeyleix (1946), Castletown (2004)
- 10 finals: (8-2) Castletown (2005)

==== Worst ====
- 1 final : (0-1) Kilcotton (1888), Skierke (1889), Aghaboe (1891), Ballacolla (1898), Camross (1906), Portlaoise (1922), Clonad (1925), Errill (1933), Rovers (1951), Cuddagh (1957), Ballyfin (1972), Ballinakill (1979), The Harps (1984), Tinnahinch (2001), Borris-in-Ossory–Kilcotton (2013)
- 2 finals: (0-2) Kilcotton (1899), Ballacolla (1907), Clonad (1928), Camross (1945), Cuddagh (1959), The Harps (1997), Tinnahinch (2002)
- 3 finals: (0-3) Ballacolla (1923), Cuddagh (1961), The Harps (1998), Tinnahinch (2006)
- 4 finals: (0-4) Ballacolla (1926)
- 5 finals: (1-4) Clonad (1932), Borris-in-Ossory–Kilcotton (2021)
- 6 finals: (2-4) Clonad (1933), Errill (1954), Portlaoise (1977)
- 7 finals: (2-5) Clonad (1934), Portlaoise (1980), Errill (1982)
- 8 finals: (2-6) Errill (1986)
- 9 finals: (4-5) Clonad (1939), Clonaslee (1975), Portlaoise (1982)
- 10 finals: (4-6) Clonad (1942), Clonaslee (1976), Portlaoise (1983)

== Laois Senior A Hurling Championship ==
This competition has existed in various guises since 1995. It was originally played as the Dick Palmer Cup up to 2009, then became a competition ancillary to the main championship. In the earlier years, clubs would qualify for the Senior B by not reaching a certain stage of the main competition.

Since 2010, it has been a proper Tier 2 competition, with promotion/relegation to/from the Senior Hurling Championship and from 2015, it has been called the Senior A Hurling Championship.

A review of Laois's hurling structures in 2019 resulted in the Laois Senior A Championship being renamed the Laois Premier Intermediate Championship.

Year	Winner	Score	Opponent	Score
2012	Clough–Ballacolla	0-16	Camross	2-05
2013	Abbeyleix	4-12	Ballyfin	0-09
2014	Ballinakill	0-22	St Fintan's, Mountrath	1-12
2015	Portlaoise	1-14	Clonaslee	1-11
2016	Castletown	1–11	Ballyfin Gaels	0–13
2017	Ballyfin Gaels	0–15	Colt	0–12
2018	Portlaoise	1-13	The Harps	1-11
2019	Rosenallis	1-12	The Harps	1-11

== See also ==
- Laois Senior Hurling Championship
- Laois Premier Intermediate Hurling Championship
- Laois Intermediate Hurling Championship
- Laois Junior A Hurling Championship
- Laois Junior B Hurling Championship
- Laois Junior C Hurling Championship
