= Kyle GAA =

GAA club in County Laois, Ireland

Kyle
- An Choill
- County: Laois
- Colours: Blue and white
- Coordinates: 52°57′35.78″N 7°41′26.62″W

Playing kits
Standard colours

Senior Club Championships
	All Ireland	Leinster champions	Laois champions
Hurling:	-	-	1

Kyle GAA is a Gaelic Athletic Association hurling club in County Laois, Ireland.

Located near Ballaghmore on the County Laois-County Tipperary border, the club colours are blue and white.

== History ==
Kyle won its only Laois Senior Hurling Championship title in 1951.

They were in the 1994 Laois Junior Hurling Championship Final.

After a memorable 2006 campaign, Kyle won the Laois Junior Hurling Championship beating neighbours Camross in the final to end a long spell without a championship title.

== Achievements ==
- Laois Senior Hurling Championship: (1) 1951
- Laois Junior Hurling Championship: (3) 1977, 2006, 2009
- Laois Junior B Hurling Championship: (2) 1993, 2018

== Notable players ==
- Kieran Carey
