= Errill GAA =

GAA club in Laois, Ireland

Errill
- Eireil
- Founded: 1928
- County: Laois
- Colours: Green and white
- Grounds: Páirc Eiréil
- Coordinates: 52°52′03.32″N 7°40′50.84″W

Playing kits
Standard colours

Senior Club Championships
	All Ireland	Leinster champions	Laois champions
Football:	-	-	0
Hurling:	-	-	2

Errill GAA is a Gaelic Athletic Association gaelic football club in Errill in County Laois, Ireland.

The club colours are green and white. The club grounds on the Roscrea Road are called Páirc Eiréil.

The club currently amalgamates at all levels of hurling with neighbouring club Rathdowney and in 2006 the Rathdowney-Errill team won the Laois Senior Hurling Championship for the first time ever.

The Errill club has twice won the Laois Senior Hurling Championship, (1938 and 1952) and won the Laois Intermediate Hurling Championship in 1981. It also won the Laois U-21 B Hurling Championship in 1997.

Although football would be very much a secondary sport in the area, there has been some success with wins in the Laois Junior C Football Championship in 2000 and 2016 and the Laois Junior B Football Championship in 2017 and 2019. Laois All-County Football League Division 5 title was also won in 1998.

== Achievements ==
- Laois Senior Hurling Championship: (2) 1938, 1952
- Laois Intermediate Hurling Championship (1) 1981
- Laois Under-21 B Hurling Championship (1) 1997
- Laois Junior C Football Championship (2) 2000, 2016
- Laois Junior B Football Championship (2) 2017, 2019
- Laois All-County Football League Div. 5: (1) 1988
