= Borris-in-Ossory GAA =

Gaelic games club in County Laois, Ireland

- Buiros Mor Osraí
- County: Laois
- Nickname: Borris
- Colours: Red and white
- Grounds: O'Keefe Park
- Coordinates: 52°56′28.40″N 7°37′02.86″W

Playing kits
Standard colours

Senior Club Championships
	All Ireland	Leinster champions	Laois champions
Hurling:	-	-	5

Borris-in-Ossory GAA is a Gaelic Athletic Association club in the village of Borris-in-Ossory, County Laois, Ireland.

The club colours are red and white and the club grounds are called O'Keefe Park.

Formerly, primarily a hurling club, Borris-in-Ossory now operates solely as a gaelic football club.

It amalgamates at all age levels with its neighbouring club, Kilcotton GAA, with which it competes in hurling as Borris-in-Ossory–Kilcotton GAA.

The clubs however field separate Gaelic football teams, and compete as separate clubs in the Laois Junior C Football Championship.

The club won five Laois Senior Hurling Championships, the last of which came in 1972. The Laois and Leinster hurler Christy O'Brien played in all five wins and was captain for the first four wins between 1956 and 1961.

== Achievements ==
- Laois Senior Hurling Championship: (5) 1956, 1957, 1960, 1961, 1972
- Laois Junior Hurling Championship: (1) 1970
- Laois Junior B Hurling Championships: (3) 1983, 1997, 2006

== Notable players ==
- Christy O'Brien
