= Ballinakill GAA =

GAA club in Ballinakill, County Laois, Ireland

Ballinakill
- Baile na Coille
- County: Laois
- Colours: Maroon and White
- Coordinates: 52°52′50.64″N 7°18′29.51″W

Playing kits
Standard colours

Senior Club Championships
	All Ireland	Leinster champions	Laois champions
Football:	-	-	1
Hurling:	-	-	0

Ballinakill GAA is a hurling and Gaelic football club in Ballinakill, County Laois, Ireland.

The club colours are maroon and white and the club grounds are in Ballinakill village near the border with County Kilkenny.

== History ==
In 1888, the Ballinakill club won the first ever Laois Senior Football Championship but these days the club is more renowned as a hurling heartland.

After two final defeats in 1941 and 1966, Ballinakill won its first ever hurling title in 1969 when they defeated Kyle in the final 2-7 to 1-5 to win the Laois Junior Hurling Championship.

For the following four years, Ballinakill was defeated in four successive Laois Intermediate Hurling Championship finals before defeating Durrow in the 1974 final to qualify for senior ranks.

Ballinakill also won three successive Laois Under 21 Hurling Championship titles in 1973, 1974 and 1975, two more in 2002 and 2003 as well as Laois Minor A Championship titles in 1970 and 1991.

In 2000 and 2001, the Laois Minor Football Championship was won by St John Bosco Gaels, an area team with players from the Ballinakill and Crettyard clubs.

2007 saw the club victorious in the Laois Junior Football Championships with a win over St Joseph's in the final.

The Harps relegated them with the last puck of the game in the 2022 Laois Senior Hurling Championship.

== Achievements ==
- Laois Senior Football Championships: (1) 1888
- Laois Premier Intermediate Hurling Championships: (1) 2021
- Laois Junior Hurling Championships: (1) 1969
- Laois Intermediate Hurling Championships: (1) 1974
- Laois Junior Football Championships: (1) 2007
- Laois Under-21 Hurling Championships: (3) 1973, 1974, 1975
- Laois Minor A Hurling Championships: (2) 1970, 1991
- Laois Minor Football Championships: (2) 2000, 2001 (as St John Bosco Gaels (with Crettyard)

== Notable players ==
- Michael "Maggie" Walsh, one of the most decorated hurlers with Laois and with Ballinakill
