= Rosenallis GAA =

GAA club Rosenallis, County Laois, Ireland

Rosenallis
- Ros Fionnghlaise
- Founded: 1902
- County: Laois
- Nickname: The Village
- Colours: Green and White
- Coordinates: 53°08′21.27″N 7°24′54.97″W

Playing kits
Standard colours

Rosenallis Gaelic Athletic Association club is a hurling and Gaelic football club in the village of Rosenallis in County Laois, Ireland.

The club colours are green and white.

At adult level, the club is a dual football and hurling club. Rosenallis field football teams at Senior, Junior B and Junior C and Hurling Teams at Senior, Junior A and Junior C.

== Past Amalgamation ==
The club formerly amalgamated with the Clonaslee–St Manman's club to play senior hurling under the name Tinnahinch.

In 1999, Rosenallis joined with Clonaslee to form a joint senior hurling, minor and underage hurling and football teams. This club was called Tinnahinch after the old barony name Tinnahinch which included the parishes of Kilmanman, Reary and Rosenallis. Tinnahinch was in 3 Senior Hurling County Hurling finals, 2002, 2003, 2006. In 2009, it won Division 3 Féile na nGael (Under 14 Hurling) national hurling title.

At adult level, this was a Gaels team which meant that both Clonaslee and Rosenallis could have their own separate Junior teams.

== History ==
In the mid-1990s, Rosenallis won the Junior Football Championship and then went on to win the Intermediate Football Championship back-to-back.

In 2016, Rosenallis won a both the hurling and the football championship in their respective grades, Intermediate hurling and Junior football . Paddy Dunne was the manager.

Rosenallis has won the Laois Intermediate Hurling Championship three times (in 1989, 1999 and 2016).

== Juvenile Setup ==
At underage Rosenallis fields hurling and football teams on its own up to u13, at u15 and u17 they amalgamate with Clonaslee to form Rosenallis/Clonaslee.

== Achievements ==
- Leinster Junior Club Football Championship Winners 2016
- Laois Intermediate Hurling Championship (3) 1989, 1999, 2016
- Laois Senior B Hurling Championship: 2019
- Laois Junior Football Championships (2) 1994, 2016
- Laois Intermediate Football Championship (2) 1995, 2019

== Notable players ==
Donnacha Hartnett plays for Rosenallis and is a regular starter on the Laois Senior Hurling Team.
