= Clough–Ballacolla GAA =

GAA club in County Laois, Ireland

Clough–Ballacolla
- Cloch–Baile na Coille
- Founded: 1890
- County: Laois
- Nickname: The Colla
- Colours: Blue and Gold
- Grounds: The Hawthorn
- Coordinates: 52°52′53.69″N 7°27′04.71″W

Playing kits
Standard colours

Senior Club Championships
	All Ireland	Leinster champions	Laois champions
Hurling:	0	0	13

Clough–Ballacolla is a Gaelic Athletic Association club in County Laois, Ireland. The colour of the club jersey is all blue with a gold band.

== History ==
Since its founding in the late 19th century, the club has changed its name a number of times and was previously known as Ballygeehan, St Canice's, Cannonswood, Ballacolla.

From 1914 to 1918, hurling was particularly strong the area with the Ballygeehan team winning the Laois Senior Hurling Championship, as well as supplying the bulk of the team in 1915 when Laois won its only All-Ireland Senior Hurling Championship. Mick Aherne, a member of the Laois senior football and hurling teams of the 1980s, is one of the best known players the club has produced.

During the late 1990s and the 2000s Clough–Ballacolla won several titles in U/14, U/16, Minor and U-21. In 2009, Clough–Ballacolla won their first Laois Senior Hurling Championship title in 91 years. They beat Portlaoise in the final. In 2011, Clough–Ballacolla regained the Laois Senior Hurling Championship beating Portlaoise in the final. In 2015, Clough–Ballacolla regained the Laois Senior Hurling Championship beating Camross in the final.

== Achievements ==
- Laois Senior Hurling Championship: 1914, 1915, 1916, 1917, 1918, 2009, 2011, 2015, 2020, 2021, 2022, 2024, 2025
- Laois Intermediate Hurling Championship: 1910, 1913, 1938, 1952, 1957, 1972, 1991, 1998,2022
- Laois Junior A Hurling Championship: 1909, 1929, 1937, 1949, 1950, 1980, 1990, 2007, 2015
- Laois Junior B Hurling Championship: 2004
- Laois Minor Hurling Championship: 1973, 2002, 2003, 2006
- All-County Football League Division 5: 2003

== Notable players ==
- Mick Aherne
- Stephen Bergin
- Lee Cleere
- John A. Delaney
- Willie Dunphy
- Jack Finlay
- Tom Finlay
- Willie Hyland, captained Laois and represented Ireland in the Shinty–Hurling International Series. He retired in 2016.
- Stephen Maher
