= Borris-in-Ossory–Kilcotton GAA =

GAA club in County Laois, Ireland

Borris-in-Ossory–Kilcotton
- Buiríos Mór Osraí–Cill Choitín
- Founded: 2011
- County: Laois
- Nickname: Borris–Kilcotton
- Colours: Green, red and white
- Grounds: O'Keeffe Park
- Coordinates: 52°56′31″N 7°37′09″W

Playing kits
Standard colours

Senior Club Championships
	All Ireland	Leinster champions	Laois champions
Hurling:	0	0	1

Borris-in-Ossory–Kilcotton GAA is a Gaelic Athletic Association club in Borris-in-Ossory, County Laois, Ireland. The club is primarily concerned with the game of hurling.

== History ==
Two separate clubs, namely Borris-in-Ossory and Kilcotton, had existed in the area and had won a total of 15 Laois SHC titles between them between 1904 and 1972. A number of factors resulted in the clubs amalgamating at all levels in January 2011. Both clubs agreed to retain their individual identities when it came to fielding a Gaelic football team.

The new club was in its infancy when it had its first successes, winning two Laois IHC titles in the space of three years between 2012 and 2014. Borris-in-Ossory–Kilcotton claimed the Laois SHC title in 2016 after defeating Rathdowney–Errill in a replay. The club contested a further three SHC finals without success, before being relegated in 2023.

Borris-in-Ossory–Kilcotton returned to the top flight of Laois hurling after winning the Laois PIHC title in 2024.

== Honours ==
- Laois Senior Hurling Championship (1): 2016
- Laois Premier Intermediate Hurling Championship (1): 2024
- Laois Intermediate Hurling Championship (2): 2012, 2014

== Notable players ==
- Neil Foyle: Joe McDonagh Cup-winner (2019)
- P. J. Scully: National Hurling League Division 2A-winner (2013)
- Matthew Whelan: Joe McDonagh Cup-winner (2019)
