= Kilcotton GAA =

GAA club in County Laois, Ireland

Kilcotton
- County: Laois
- Nickname: The Sash
- Colours: Green, White and Gold
- Grounds: Knockaroo
- Coordinates: 52°55′54.93″N 7°34′37.11″W

Playing kits
Standard colours

Senior Club Championships
	All Ireland	Leinster champions	Laois champions
Hurling:	-	-	10

Kilcotton GAA is a Gaelic Athletic Association hurling club in County Laois, Ireland.

The club colours are green with gold trim and a white sash. The grounds are at knockaroo.

Formerly primarily hurling club, Kilcotton now operates solely as a Gaelic football club.

It amalgamated at all age levels with its neighbouring club, Borris-in-Ossory GAA, with which it competes in hurling as Borris-in-Ossory-Kilcotton GAA. The clubs however field separate Gaelic football teams and compete as separate clubs in the Laois Junior C Football Championship.

== Honours ==
- Laois Senior Hurling Championship: (10) 1904, 1905, 1906, 1909, 1913, 1919, 1920, 1923, 1924, 1929
- Laois Intermediate Hurling Championship (3) 1984, 1991, 2002
- Laois Junior B Hurling Championship (1) 2005
- Laois All-County Hurling League (1) 2004
