= 2023 Laois Senior Hurling Championship =

Annual hurling competition season

- Dates: 19 July - 8 October 2023
- Teams: 8
- Sponsor: Laois Shopping Centre
- Champions: Camross (27th title); Darragh Duggan (captain); David Cuddy (manager)
- Runners-up: Abbeyleix St Lazarian's; Oisín Carroll (captain); P. J. Peacock (manager)
- Relegated: Borris-in-Ossory/Kilcotton

Tournament statistics
- Matches played: 18
- Goals scored: 69 (3.83 per match)
- Points scored: 688 (38.22 per match)
- Top scorer(s): Stephen Maher (4-51)

The 2023 Laois Senior Hurling Championship was the 130th staging of the Laois Senior Hurling Championship since its establishment by the Laois County Board in 1888. The draw for the group stage placings took place in March 2023. The championship ran from 19 July to 8 October 2023.

Clough–Ballacolla entered the championship as the defending champions, however, they were beaten by Camross at the semi-final stage. Borris-in-Ossory/Kilcotton, who had contested three of the previous four finals, were relegated after being beaten by The Harps in a relegation playoff.

The final was played on 8 October 2023 at Laois Hire O'Moore Park in Port Laoise, between Camross and Abbeyleix St Lazarian's, in what was their second meeting in the final overall and a first meeting in 78 years. Camross won the match by 4–18 to 0–14 to claim their 27th championship title overall and a first title in five years.

Clough–Ballacolla's Stephen Maher was the championship's top scorer with 4-51.

== Team changes ==
=== To Championship ===
Promoted from the Laois Premier Intermediate Hurling Championship

- Abbeyleix St Lazarian's

=== From Championship ===
Relegated to the Laois Premier Intermediate Hurling Championship

- Ballinakill

== Group A ==
=== Group A table ===
Advanced to semi-finals Advanced to quarter-finals Advanced to relegation playoff

Team	Matches				Score			Pts
Team	Pld	W	D	L	For	Against	Diff	Pts
Rathdowney–Errill	3	3	0	0	88	60	28	6
Clough–Ballacolla	3	2	0	1	92	69	23	4
Rosenallis	3	1	0	2	57	86	-29	2
The Harps	3	0	0	3	71	93	-22	0

=== Group A results ===
20 July 2023 Round 1	Rathdowney–Errill	0-21 - 2-11	Clough–Ballacolla	Laois Hire O'Moore Park
	R King 0-14, J Kelly 0-2, M Kavanagh 0-2, B McGinley 0-2, E Killeen 0-1.		S Maher 0-7, C Hogan 1-0, S Corby 1-0, C Dunne 0-2, L Cleere 0-1, M Hennessy 0-1.

22 July 2023 Round 1	The Harps	0-17 - 2-14	Rosenallis	Laois Hire O'Moore Park
	Ciaran Comerford 0-12, T Doheny 0-1, Cody Comerford 0-1, C Murphy 0-1, C Brophy 0-1, J Duggan 0-1.		D Dooley 0-10, J Hyland 1-2, C Friel 1-0, FC Fennell 0-1, B Fitzpatrick 0-1.

5 August 2023 Round 2	Rathdowney–Errill	3-26 - 1-12	Rosenallis	Laois Hire O'Moore Park
	R King 1-10, J Kelly 0-6, E Bourke 1-2, P Rafter 1-0, D Carroll 0-3, E Killeen 0-2, L O'Connell 0-1, J Ryan 0-1, M Kavanagh 0-1, B McGinley 0-1.		D Dooley 0-5, J Hyland 1-1, P Keating 0-3, D Hartnett 0-1, C Friel 0-1, FC Fennell 0-1.

5 August 2023 Round 2	Clough–Ballacolla	5-26 - 3-17	The Harps	Laois Hire O'Moore Park
	S Maher 3-8, S Bergin 2-8, C Dunne 0-2, K Mulhall 0-2, A Corby 0-2, J Walsh 0-2, L Cleere 0-1, R Phelan 0-1.		J Duggan 1-5, Ciaran Comerford 0-7, P Delaney 1-1, Cody Comerford 1-0, C Murphy 0-2, C Burke 0-1, J Lappin 0-1.

19 August 2023 Round 3	Rathdowney–Errill	3-23 - 2-22	The Harps	Laois Hire O'Moore Park
	R King 0-14, J Kelly 1-3, M Kavanagh 1-0, P Purcell 1-0, P Rafter 0-2, D Carroll 0-1, J Keane 0-1, E Killeen 0-1, S Pearson 0-1.		Ciaran Comerford 1-8, J Brophy 1-0, C Murphy 0-3, J Duggan 0-3, J Lappin 0-2, C Dunne 0-2, E O'Sullivan 0-1, Cody Comerford 0-1, C Burke 0-1, J O'Connor 0-1.

19 August 2023 Round 3	Clough–Ballacolla	2-28 - 0-22	Rosenallis	Laois Hire O'Moore Park
	S Maher 1-7, S Bergin 1-5, C Dunne 0-7, M Hennessy 0-2, C Hogan 0-2, W Dunphy 0-2, R Phelan 0-2, J Walsh 0-1.		D Dooley 0-6, P Keating 0-4, FC Fennelly 0-3, J Hyland 0-2, C Friel 0-2, M Bennett 0-1, B Fitzpatrick 0-1, RC Fennell 0-1, D Hartnett 0-1, C Cosgrave 0-1.

== Group B ==
=== Group B table ===
Advanced to semi-finals Advanced to quarter-finals Advanced to relegation playoff

Team	Matches				Score			Pts
Team	Pld	W	D	L	For	Against	Diff	Pts
Camross	3	2	0	1	81	67	14	4
Abbeyleix St Lazarian's	3	2	0	1	69	60	9	4
Castletown	3	1	0	2	54	74	-20	2
Borris-in-Ossory/Kilcotton	3	1	0	2	65	68	-3	2

=== Group B results ===
19 July 2023 Round 1	Castletown	1-14 - 3-22	Camross	Laois Hire O'Moore Park
	C McKelvey 0-6, M Phelan 1-0, D Conroy 0-2, R Mullaney 0-1, S Phelan 0-1, C Doran 0-1, J Breen 0-1, A Gaughan 0-1, A Phelan 0-1.		T Keyes 2-5, D Delaney 0-9, M Dowling 1-3, C Collier 0-2, L Delaney 0-2, Z Keenan 0-1.

21 July 2023 Round 1	Borris-in-Ossory/Kilcotton	2-13 - 3-13	Abbeyleix St Lazarian's	Laois Hire O'Moore Park
	N Foyle 1-2, J Quinlan 0-4, A Dunphy 0-4, PJ Scully 1-0, S Dunphy 0-2, D Carey 0-1.		A Brennan 0-8, Ciaran Byrne 1-1, Colin Byrne 1-0, F Mahony 1-0, E Rowland 0-3, C Walsh 0-1.

6 August 2023 Round 2	Camross	2-19 - 1-18	Abbeyleix St Lazarian's	Laois Hire O'Moore Park
	D Delaney 1-8, T Keyes 1-5, R Tyrrell 0-2, O Phelan 0-1, J Cuddy 0-1, E Gaughan 0-1, Z Keenan 0-1.		E Fennelly 0-10, Ciaran Byrne 1-1, L Delaney 0-3, L Doyle 0-1, Colin Byrne 0-1, R Coffey 0-1, A Brennan 0-1.

6 August 2023 Round 2	Castletown	0-21 - 1-14	Borris-in-Ossory/Kilcotton	Laois Hire O'Moore Park
	C McKelvey 0-9, R Mullaney 0-3, J Breen 0-2, C Doran 0-2, D Conroy 0-1, T Cuddy 0-1, M Phelan 0-1, J Gaughan 0-1, B Reddin 0-1.		PJ Scully 1-8, J Quinlan 0-3, S Dunphy 0-2, E Jones 0-1.

20 August 2023 Round 3	Camross	2-19 - 2-23	Borris-in-Ossory/Kilcotton	Laois Hire O'Moore Park
	T Keyes 1-4, M Dowling 1-2, Z Keenan 0-3, T Cuddy 0-2, C Collier 0-2, E Gaughan 0-2, L Delaney 0-1, D Delaney 0-1, L Burke 0-1, O Bennett 0-1.		PJ Scully 2-8, A Dunphy 0-7, S Dunphy 0-4, J Quinlan 0-1, D Carey 0-1, N Coss 0-1, N Foyle 0-1.

20 August 2023 Round 3	Abbeyleix St Lazarian's	2-20 - 2-10	Castletown	Laois Hire O'Moore Park
	A Brennan 1-6, Ciaran Byrne 1-2, E Rowland 0-5, E Fennelly 0-4, C Walsh 0-2, L Delaney 0-1, F Mahony 0-1.		D Conroy 0-4, B Reddin 1-0, J Breen 1-0, M Phelan 0-2, J Gaughan 0-1, T Cuddy 0-1, E Peters 0-1, D Tobin 0-1.

== Knockout stage ==
=== Relegation playoff ===
30 August 2023 Playoff	The Harps	0-28 - 2-20	Borris-in-Ossory/Kilcotton	Laois Hire O'Moore Park
	Ciaran Comerford 0-9, J Duggan 0-7, Cody Comerford 0-2, J O'Connor 0-2, C Murphy 0-2, J Brophy 0-2, P Dunne 0-1, C Burke 0-1, P Delaney 0-1, M Lanigan 0-1.		PJ Scully 0-9, N Coss 1-2, D Carey 1-0, N Quinlan 0-2, S Dunphy 0-1, N Foyle 0-1, G Quinlan 0-1, N Quinlan 0-1, C Kilbane 0-1, A Dunphy 0-1, M Whelan 0-1.

=== Quarter-finals ===
10 September 2023 Quarter-final	Abbeyleix St Lazarian's	3-26 - 0-16	Rosenallis	Laois Hire O'Moore Park
	E Fennelly 1-10, E Rowland 1-2, Colin Byrne 1-1, S Fitzpatrick 0-3, Ciaran Byrne 0-3, L Delaney 0-2, F Mahony 0-2, A Brennan 0-2, C Walsh 0-1.		D Dooley 0-6, J Lennon 0-2, J Hyland 0-2, FC Fennelly 0-2, J O'Loughlin 0-1, P Keating 0-1, B Fitzpatrick 0-1, D Hartnett 0-1.

10 September 2023 Quarter-final	Clough–Ballacolla	2-25 - 2-24 (aet)	Castletown	Laois Hire O'Moore Park
	S Maher 0-17, W Dunphy 1-4, R Phelan 1-0, A Corby 0-1, S Bergin 0-1, J Walsh 0-1, M Hennessy 0-1.		D Conroy 0-8, M Phelan 1-2, R Mullaney 0-4, C Phelan 1-0, B Reddin 0-3, J Breen 0-3, C McKelvey 0-1, S Cuddy 0-1, S Óg Byrne 0-1.

=== Semi-finals ===
24 September 2023 Semi-final	Rathdowney–Errill	3-18 - 3-20 (aet)	Abbeyleix St Lazarian's	Laois Hire O'Moore Park
	R King 0-11, P Purcell 1-1, M Kavanagh 1-1, T Dowling 1-0, P Rafter 0-1, J Fitzpatrick 0-1, J Kelly 0-1, E Killeen 0-1, E Bourke 0-1.		E Fennelly 0-8, F Mahony 1-4, Colin Byrne 1-3, E Rowland 1-1, L Delaney 0-2, C Walsh 0-1, A Brennan 0-1.

24 September 2023 Semi-final	Camross	4-14 - 2-20; Penalties: 2-1	Clough–Ballacolla	Laois Hire O'Moore Park
	T Cuddy 2-0, Z Keenan 0-5, M Dowling 1-0, O Bennett 1-0, T Keyes 0-3, D Delaney 0-3, E Gaughan 0-1, J Cuddy 0-1.		S Maher 0-12, W Dunphy 2-1, S Bergin 0-4, C Dunne 0-1, M Hennessy 0-1, R Phelan 0-1.

=== Final ===
8 October 2023 Final	Abbeyleix St Lazarian's	0-14 - 4-18	Camross	Laois Hire O'Moore Park
	E Fennelly 0-7 (5f), Ciarán Byrne 0-3, Colin Byrne 0-2, L Doyle, L Delaney 0-1 each.	Report	T Keyes 3-6, M Dowling 1-0, T Cuddy, L Delaney (1f), C Collier 0-2 each, E Gaughan, O Phelan, A Collier, D Delaney, O Bennett, Z Keenan (f) 0-1 each.

== Championship statistics ==
=== Top scorers ===
Overall

Rank	Player	Club	Tally	Total	Matches	Average
1	Stephen Maher	Clough–Ballacolla	4-51	63	6	10.50
2	Ross King	Rathdowney–Errill	1-49	52	4	13.00
3	Tomás Keyes	Camross	7-23	44	5	8.80
4	Eoghan Fennelly	Abbeyleix St Lazarian's	1-39	42	5	8.40
5	Ciarán Comerford	The Harps	1-36	39	4	9.75
6	P. J. Scully	Borris-in-Ossory/Kilcotton	4-25	37	4	9.25
7	Stephen Bergin	Clough–Ballacolla	3-18	27	5	5.40
7	David Dooley	Rosenallis	0-27	27	4	6.75
9	Daniel Delaney	Camross	1-22	25	5	5.00
10	Aaron Brennan	Abbeyleix St Lazarian's	1-17	20	5	4.00

In a single game

Rank	Player	Club	Tally	Total	Opposition
1	Stephen Maher	Clough–Ballacolla	3-08	17	The Harps
1	Stephen Maher	Clough–Ballacolla	0-17	17	Castletown
3	Tomás Keyes	Camross	3-06	15	Abbeyleix St Lazarian's
4	P. J. Scully	Borris-in-Ossory/Kilcotton	2-08	14	Camross
4	Stephen Bergin	Clough–Ballacolla	2-08	14	The Harps
4	Ross King	Rathdowney–Errill	0-14	14	Clough–Ballacolla
4	Ross King	Rathdowney–Errill	0-14	14	The Harps
8	Eoghan Fennelly	Abbeyleix St Lazarian's	1-10	13	Rosenallis
8	Ross King	Rathdowney–Errill	1-10	13	Rosenallis
10	Ciarán Comerford	The Harps	1-10	13	Rosenallis

=== Miscellaneous ===
- Abbeyleix St Lazarian's qualified for the final for the first time since 1949.
