= 1990 Laois Senior Hurling Championship =

Annual hurling competition season

- Dates: 6 May – 9 September 1990
- Teams: 12
- Champions: Camross (19th title); Pat Carroll (captain); P. J. Cuddy (manager)
- Runners-up: Portlaoise; Jimmy Keenan (captain)

Tournament statistics
- Matches played: 16
- Goals scored: 68 (4.25 per match)
- Points scored: 280 (17.5 per match)

The 1990 Laois Senior Hurling Championship was the 97th staging of the Laois Senior Hurling Championship since its establishment by the Laois County Board in 1888. The championship ran from 6 May to 9 September 1990.

Portlaoise were the defending champions.

The final was played on 9 September 1990 at O'Moore Park in Portlaoise, between Camross and Portlaoise, in what was their eighth meeting in the final overall. Camross won the match by 2–13 to 1–09 to claim a record-breaking 19th championship title overall and a first title in two years.

== Results ==
=== First round ===
6 May 1990 First round 2	Clonad	3-14 - 0-04	Castletown Gaels	St Fintan's Park

6 May 1990 First round 3	Borris Gaels	3-14 - 4-02	Errill	St Fintan's Park

6 May 1990 First round 5	The Harps	6-09 - 1-04	St Fintan's	Fr Breen Park

6 May 1990 First round 6	Portlaoise	2-13 - 2-02	St Michael's	Fr Breen Park

6 May 1990 First round 1	St Patrick's	2-09 - 0-11	Rathdowney	Durrow Grounds

6 May 1990 First round 4	Camross	9-07 - 2-05	Rosenallis	Páirc Acragar

=== Losers' group ===
10 June 1990 Quarter-final	St Fintan's	3-09 - 1-07	Rosenallis	O'Moore Park

20 July 1990 Quarter-final	Rathdowney	1-13 - 1-12	Castletown Gaels	Kelly O'Daly Park

24 June 1990 Semi-final	St Michael's	6-08 - 3-04	St Fintan's	O'Moore Park

29 July 1990 Semi-final	Errill	2-12 - 1-08	Rathdowney	Knockaroo Grounds

- Errill and St Michael's qualified for the losers' group final which doubled up as a quarter-final.

=== Quarter-finals ===
30 June 1990 Quarter-final	Portlaoise	2-06 - 2-05	The Harps	Kelly O'Daly Park

30 June 1990 Quarter-final	Camross	2-15 - 2-14	Borris Gaels	St Fintan's Park

5 August 1990 Quarter-final	Errill	1-11 - 1-06	St Michael's	O'Moore Park

5 August 1990 Quarter-final	Clonad	w/o - scr.	St Patrick's	O'Moore Park

=== Semi-finals ===
19 August 1990 Semi-final	Camross	2-11 - 1-05	Clonad	O'Moore Park

19 August 1990 Semi-final	Portlaoise	0-11 - 0-07	Errill	O'Moore Park

=== Final ===
9 September 1990 Final	Camross	2-13 - 1-09	Portlaoise	O'Moore Park
