= 2016 Laois Senior Hurling Championship =

Annual hurling competition season

- Dates: 22 July – 23 October 2016
- Teams: 8
- Sponsor: Laois Shopping Centre
- Champions: Borris-in-Ossory–Kilcotton (1st title); Brian Stapleton (captain); Ken Hogan (manager)
- Runners-up: Rathdowney–Errill; Brian Campion (captain); Brian Young (manager)
- Relegated: The Harps

Tournament statistics
- Matches played: 19
- Goals scored: 40 (2.11 per match)
- Points scored: 587 (30.89 per match)

The 2016 Laois Senior Hurling Championship was the 123rd staging of the Laois Senior Hurling Championship since its establishment by the Laois County Board in 1888. The draw for the opening round fixtures was made on 3 March 2016. The championship ran from 22 July to 23 October 2016.

Clough–Ballacolla entered the championship as the defending champions.

The final was played on 23 October 2016 at O'Moore Park in Port Laoise, between Borris-in-Ossory–Kilcotton and Rathdowney–Errill, in what was their first ever meeting in the final. Borris-in-Ossory–Kilcotton won the match by 1–18 to 2–10 to claim their first ever championship title.

== Participating teams ==
Team	Location	Colours	Manager	Captain(s)
Abbeyleix St Lazerian's	Abbeyleix	Primrose and blue	Mark Tyrrell	Oisín Carroll; Enda Rowland
Ballinakill	Ballinakill	Maroon and white	James Carroll	T. J. Lalor
Borris-in-Ossory–Kilcotton	Borris-in-Ossory	Green, red and white	Ken Hogan	Brian Stapleton
Camross	Camross	Black and yellow	Arien Delaney	Malvin Moloney
Clough–Ballacolla	Ballacolla	Blue and gold	Kevin Martin	Willie Hyland
Rathdowney–Errill	Rathdowney	Red, white and green	Brian Young	Brian Campion
Ballinakill	Ballinakill	Maroon and white	James Carroll	T. J. Lalor
The Harps	Durrow	Red and yellow	David Cuddy	John Prior

== Results ==
=== Round 1 ===
22 July 2016 Round 1	Rathdowney–Errill	0-16 - 1-14	Camross	O'Moore Park

23 July 2016 Round 1	Abbeyleix	0-17 - 1-18	Borris-in-Ossory–Kilcotton	O'Moore Park

23 July 2016 Round 1	Portlaoise	0-16 - 1-19	Clough–Ballacolla	O'Moore Park

24 July 2016 Round 1	Ballinakill	1-15 - 0-08	The Harps	O'Moore Park

=== Round 2A ===
6 August 2016 Round 2A	Clough–Ballacolla	1-12 - 2-18	Camross	O'Moore Park

7 August 2016 Round 2A	Borris-in-Ossory–Kilcotton	0-17 - 1-14	Ballinakill	O'Moore Park

10 August 2016 Round 2A replay	Borris-in-Ossory–Kilcotton	2-06 - 1-11	Ballinakill	O'Moore Park

=== Round 2B ===
6 August 2016 Round 2B	Portlaoise	1-17 - 1-17	The Harps	O'Moore Park

7 August 2016 Round 2B	Rathdowney–Errill	3-19 - 2-16	Abbeyleix	O'Moore Park

9 August 2016 Round 2B replay	Portlaoise	0-18 - 0-16	The Harps	O'Moore Park

=== Relegation playoff ===
21 August 2016 Playoff	Abbeyleix	1-12 - 1-11	The Harps	O'Moore Park

=== Quarter-finals ===
20 August 2016 Semi-final	Rathdowney–Errill	2-18 - 3-13	Clough–Ballacolla	O'Moore Park

21 August 2016 Quarter-final	Borris-in-Ossory–Kilcotton	2-24 - 1-15	Portlaoise	O'Moore Park
	PJ Scully 0-11, N Foyle 1-2, E Fitzpatrick 1-1, J Campion 0-4, A Dunphy 0-4, D Fitzpatrick 0-1, B Meade 0-1.		A Bergin 0-8, T Fitzgerald 1-0, S Culleton 0-3, D Delaney 0-2, C Taylor 0-1, J Phelan 0-1.

=== Semi-finals ===
11 September 2016 Semi-final	Borris-in-Ossory–Kilcotton	1-13 - 0-16	Ballinakill	O'Moore Park
	E Fleming 1-2, D Quinlan 0-4, J Campion 0-3, P Whelan 0-2, A Dunphy 0-1, S Phelan 0-1.		C Dwyer 0-10, S Dwyer 0-2, E Dwyer 0-2, TJ Lalor 0-1, S Downey 0-1.

11 September 2016 Semi-final	Rathdowney–Errill	1-16 - 2-13	Camross	O'Moore Park
	R King 0-9, L O'Connell 1-0, T Dowling 0-3, P Purcell 0-2, D Poynton 0-1, J Kelly 0-1.		Z Keenan 1-8, D Duggan 1-1, D Dooley 0-2, A Collier 0-1, D Palmer 0-1.

25 September 2016 Semi-final replay	Borris-in-Ossory–Kilcotton	1-10 - 0-12	Ballinakill	O'Moore Park
	J Campion 1-2, PJ Scully 0-4, D Quinlan 0-3, A Dunphy 0-1.		C Dwyer 0-8, S Dwyer 0-2, TJ Lalor 0-1, E Jackman 0-1.

25 September 2016 Semi-final replay	Rathdowney–Errill	0-17 - 1-13	Camross	O'Moore Park
	R King 0-8, J Purcell 0-2, L O'Connell 0-2, D Poynton 0-2, J Keane 0-1, E Killeen 0-1, E Meagher 0-1.		Z Keenan 0-7, N Holemes 1-0, D Dooley 0-2, A Collier 0-2, D Gilmartin 0-1, D Duggan 0-1.

=== Final ===
9 October 2016 Final	Borris-in-Ossory–Kilcotton	2-26 - 2-26	Rathdowney–Errill	O'Moore Park
	PJ Scully 0-12 (11f), N Foyle 2-2, A Dunphy 0-4, J Campion and P Whelan 0-3 each, E Fitzpatrick and J Fitzpatrick 0-1 each.	Report	R King 0-14 (8f), T Dowling 0-6, L O'Connell 1-2, J Purcell 1-0, J Kelly 0-2, J Ryan and D Poynton 0-1 each.

=== Final replay ===
9 October 2016 Final	Borris-in-Ossory–Kilcotton	1-18 - 2-10	Rathdowney–Errill	O'Moore Park
	PJ Scully 0-12 (12f), N Foyle 1-0, J Campion 0-2, P Whelan, D Fitzpatrick, C Stapleton, A Dunphy 0-1 each.	Report	R King 0-9 (7f), P Purcell, J Purcell 1-0 each, J Corrigan 0-1.
