= 1937 Laois Senior Hurling Championship =

Annual hurling competition season

- Champions: Clonad (4th title)
- Runners-up: Abbeyleix

The 1937 Laois Senior Hurling Championship was the 44th staging of the Laois Senior Hurling Championship since its establishment by the Laois County Board in 1888.

Rathdowney were the defending champions.

The final was played on 6 December 1937 at O'Moore Park in Portlaoise, between Clonad and Abbeyleix, in what was their third meeting in the final overall. Clonad won the match by 2–07 to 2–01 to claim their fourth championship title overall and a first title in two years.

== Results ==
=== Final ===
6 December 1937 Final	Clonad	2-07 - 2-01	Abbeyleix	O'Moore Park
