= 2011 Laois Senior Hurling Championship =

Annual hurling competition season

- Teams: 8
- Sponsor: Sparrow Insurances
- Champions: Clough–Ballacolla (2nd title); John A. Delaney (captain); John O'Sullivan (manager)
- Runners-up: Portlaoise; Joe Phelan (captain); Paul Bergin (manager)

The 2011 Laois Senior Hurling Championship was the 118th staging of the Laois Senior Hurling Championship since its establishment by the Laois County Board in 1888.

Rathdowney–Errill entered the championship as the defending champions.

The final was played on 9 October 2011 at O'Moore Park in Port Laoise, between Clough–Ballacolla and Portlaoise, in what was their second meeting in the final. Clough–Ballacolla won the match by 1–10 to 0–11 to claim their second championship title overall and a first title in two years.

== Results ==
=== Semi-finals ===
25 September 2011 Semi-final	Clough–Ballacolla	6-07 - 0-11	The Harps	O'Moore Park

25 September 2011 Semi-final	Portlaoise	1-09 - 0-08	Ballinakill	O'Moore Park

=== Final ===
9 October 2011 Final	Clough–Ballacolla	1-10 - 0-11	Portlaoise	O'Moore Park
	M Dunphy 1-1, W Hyland 0-3 (all frees), M McEvoy, D Bergin 0-2 each, T Delaney, W Dunphy 0-1 each.	Report	N Costelloe 0-6 (0-5f), T Byrne, C Healy, E Costello, T Fitzgerald, B Fitzgerald 0-1 each.
