= 1992 Laois Senior Hurling Championship =

Annual hurling competition season

- Dates: 8 May – 4 October 1992
- Teams: 13
- Champions: Clonad (14th title); Pat Norton (captain)
- Runners-up: Portlaoise; John Taylor (captain)

Tournament statistics
- Matches played: 17
- Goals scored: 70 (4.12 per match)
- Points scored: 303 (17.82 per match)

The 1992 Laois Senior Hurling Championship was the 99th staging of the Laois Senior Hurling Championship since its establishment by the Laois County Board in 1888. The championship ran from 8 May to 4 October 1992.

Portlaoise were the defending champions.

The final was played on 4 October 1992 at O'Moore Park in Portlaoise, between Clonad and Portlaoise, in what was their fourth meeting in the final overall. Clonad won the match by 0–16 to 2–07 to claim their 14th championship title overall and a first title in 22 years. It was the first time since 1975 that a team other than Camross or Portlaoise won the title.

== Results ==
=== Preliminary round ===
20 June 1992 Preliminary round	The Harps	6-21 - 0-02	St Patrick's	Kelly O'Daly Park

=== First round ===
8 May 1992 First round	St Fintan's	0-05 - 0-07	Clough–Ballacolla	Fr Breen Park

21 June 1992 First round	Castletown Gaels	2-09 - 3-10	Errill	St Fintan's Park

21 June 1992 First round	Borris Gaels	1-08 - 3-12	Camross	St Fintan's Park

3 July 1992 First round	Rosenallis	5-06 - 2-06	Mountrath	Páirc Acragar

4 July 1992 First round	Rathdowney	1-06 - 2-12	The Harps	O'Moore Park

4 July 1992 First round	Portlaoise	1-04 - 2-08	Clonad	O'Moore Park

=== Losers' group ===
19 July 1992 Quarter-final	Portlaoise	8-17 - 0-09	Castletown Gaels	O'Moore Park

19 July 1992 Quarter-final	Borris Gaels	4-17 - 4-04	Mountrath	O'Moore Park

Quarter-final	Rathdowney	w/o - scr.	St Patrick's	Páirc Shéain Uí hUidhrín

24 July 1992 Semi-final	St Fintan's	0-08 - 5-13	Rathdowney	St Fintan's Park

31 July 1992 Semi-final	Portlaoise	w/o - scr.	Borris Gaels	St Fintan's Park

- Portlaoise and Rathdowney qualified for the losers' group final which doubled up as a quarter-final.

=== Quarter-finals ===
31 July 1992 Quarter-final	Clonad	3-08 - 0-10	Errill	Kelly O'Daly Park

15 August 1992 Quarter-final	The Harps	2-09 - 1-04	Clough–Ballacolla	Kelly O'Daly Park

16 August 1992 Quarter-final	Camross	2-08 - 1-03	Rosenallis	O'Moore Park

5 September 1992 Quarter-final	Portlaoise	2-13 - 1-06	Rathdowney	St Fintan's Park

=== Semi-finals ===
13 September 1992 Semi-final	The Harps	1-09 - 1-07	Portlaoise	O'Moore Park

13 September 1992 Semi-final	Clonad	2-12 - 3-07	Camross	O'Moore Park

=== Final ===
4 October 1992 Final	Clonad	0-16 - 2-07	Portlaoise	O'Moore Park
