= 1919 Laois Senior Hurling Championship =

Annual hurling competition season

- Champions: Kilcotton (6th title); Jack Carroll (captain)
- Runners-up: Ballygeehan

The 1919 Laois Senior Hurling Championship was the 26th staging of the Laois Senior Hurling Championship since its establishment by the Laois County Board in 1888.

Ballygeehan were the defending champions.

The final was played on 11 July 1920 at the County Grounds in Portlaoise, between Kilcotton and Ballygeehan, in what was their fourth meeting in the final overall. Kilcotton won the match by 4–01 to 0–01 to claim their sixth championship title overall and a first title in six years.

== Results ==
=== Final ===
11 July 1920 Final	Kilcotton	4-01 - 0-01	Ballygeehan	County Grounds
