= 1993 Laois Senior Hurling Championship =

Annual hurling competition season

- Sponsor: Downey Auto Stop
- Champions: Camross (20th title); Fintan Lalor (captain)
- Runners-up: Portlaoise; Pat Critchley (captain)

The 1993 Laois Senior Hurling Championship was the 100th staging of the Laois Senior Hurling Championship since its establishment by the Laois County Board in 1888.

Clonad were the defending champions.

The final, a replay, was played on 10 October 1993 at O'Moore Park in Portlaoise, between Camross and Portlaoise, in what was their ninth meeting in the final overall. Camross won the match by 1–13 to 2–09 to claim their 20th championship title overall and a first title in two years.

== Results ==
=== Semi-finals ===
29 August 1993 Semi-final	Portlaoise	1-13 - 0-05	Clough–Ballacolla	Kelly O'Daly Park

12 September 1993 Semi-final	Camross	3-07 - 1-05	The Harps	O'Moore Park

=== Final ===
26 September 1993 Final	Camross	1-13 - 2-10	Portlaoise	O'Moore Park

=== Final replay ===
10 October 1993 Final replay	Camross	1-13 - 2-09	Portlaoise	O'Moore Park
