= 1950 Laois Senior Hurling Championship =

Annual hurling competition season

- Champions: Clonad (8th title)
- Runners-up: Errill

The 1950 Laois Senior Hurling Championship was the 57th staging of the Laois Senior Hurling Championship since its establishment by the Laois County Board in 1888.

Abbeyleix were the defending champions.

The final was played on 27 August 1950 at O'Moore Park in Portlaoise, between Clonad and Errill, in what was their first ever meeting in the final. Clonad won the match by 3–13 to 1–05 to claim their eighth championship title overall and a first title in two years. The Bob O'Keeffe Cup was presented to the winners for the first time.

== Results ==
=== Final ===
27 August 1950 Final	Clonad	3-13 - 1-05	Errill	O'Moore Park
