= 1970 Laois Senior Hurling Championship =

Annual hurling competition season

- Dates: 19 April – 4 October 1970
- Teams: 11
- Champions: Clonad (13th title); George Conroy (captain)
- Runners-up: Clonaslee

Tournament statistics
- Matches played: 15
- Goals scored: 89 (5.93 per match)
- Points scored: 191 (12.73 per match)

The 1970 Laois Senior Hurling Championship was the 77th staging of the Laois Senior Hurling Championship since its establishment by the Laois County Board in 1888. The championship ran from 19 April to 4 October 1970.

Camross were the defending champions.

The final was played on 4 October 1970 at O'Moore Park in Portlaoise, between Clonad and Clonaslee, in what was their first ever meeting in the final overall. Clonaslee won the match by 2–09 to 2–06 to claim their 13th championship title overall and a first title in eight years.

== Results ==
=== First round ===
19 April 1970 First round 1	Abbeyleix	2-06 - 2-02	Portlaoise	O'Moore Park

19 April 1970 First round 2	Mountmellick	2-04 - 2-06	St Conleth's	O'Moore Park

19 April 1970 First round 4	Clonad	6-06 - 0-05	Ballygeehan	St Fintan's Park

26 April 1970 First round 3	Cullohil/Durrow	1-01 - 8-06	Clonaslee	O'Moore Park

26 April 1970 First round 5	Rathdowney	0-00 - 3-10	Camross	St Fintan's Park

- Borris-in-Ossory received a bye in this round.

=== Second round ===
28 June 1970 Second round	Clonad	2-09 - 1-06	Camross	O'Moore Park

12 July 1970 Second round	St Conleth's	1-06 - 5-10	Clonaslee	St Fintan's Park

2 August 1970 Second round	Borris-in-Ossory	4-04 - 3-08	Abbeyleix	St Fintan's Park

=== Losers' group ===
7 June 1970 First round	Cullohill/Durrow	8-09 - 4-09	Ballygeehan	Kelly Daly Park

7 June 1970 First round	Portlaoise	5-07 - 2-01	Mountmellick	O'Moore Park

14 June 1970 Second round	Rathdowney	4-06 - 3-05	Portlaoise	St Fintan's Park

5 July 1970 Third round	Rathdowney	4-11 - 5-02	Cullohill/Durrow	St Fintan's Park

=== Semi-finals ===
30 August 1970 Semi-final	Clonaslee	2-17 - 0-04	Abbeyleix	O'Moore Park

30 August 1970 Semi-final	Clonad	3-08 - 3-08	Rathdowney	O'Moore Park

20 September 1970 Semi-final replay	Clonad	w/o - scr.	Rathdowney	O'Moore Park

=== Final ===
4 October 1970 Final	Clonad	2-09 - 2-06	Clonaslee	O'Moore Park
