= 2012 Laois Senior Hurling Championship =

Annual hurling competition season

- Champions: Rathdowney–Errill (3rd title); Shane Dollard (captain); Frank McGrath (manager)
- Runners-up: Clough–Ballacolla; John A. Delaney (captain); John McEvoy (manager)

The 2012 Laois Senior Hurling Championship was the 119th staging of the Laois Senior Hurling Championship since its establishment by the Laois County Board in 1888.

Clough–Ballacolla were the defending champions.

The final, a replay, was played on 21 October 2012 at O'Moore Park in Portlaoise, between Rathdowney–Errill and Clough–Ballacolla, in what was their first ever meeting in the final. Rathdowney–Errill won the match by 0–17 to 0–14 to claim their third championship title overall and a first title in four years.

== Results ==
=== Semi-finals ===
16 September 2012 Semi-final	Rathdowney–Errill	1-18 - 0-13	The Harps	O'Moore Park

16 September 2012 Semi-final	Clough–Ballacolla	1-17 - 2-11	Borris–Kilcotton	O'Moore Park

=== Final ===
14 October 2012 Final	Rathdowney–Errill	1-11 - 2-08	Clough–Ballacolla	O'Moore Park

=== Final replay ===
21 October 2012 Final replay	Rathdowney–Errill	0-17 - 0-14	Clough–Ballacolla	O'Moore Park
