= 1989 Laois Senior Hurling Championship =

Annual hurling competition season

- Champions: Portlaoise (8th title); John Bohane (captain)
- Runners-up: Camross

The 1989 Laois Senior Hurling Championship was the 96th staging of the Laois Senior Hurling Championship since its establishment by the Laois County Board in 1888.

Camross were the defending champions.

The final, a replay, was played on 15 October 1989 at O'Moore Park in Portlaoise, between Portlaoise and Camross, in what was their seventh meeting in the final overall. Portlaoise won the match by 0–12 to 1–04 to claim their eighth championship title overall and a first title in two years.

== Results ==
=== Final ===
1 October 1989 Final	Portlaoise	1-09 - 2-06	Camross	O'Moore Park

=== Final replay ===
15 October 1989 Final replay	Portlaoise	0-12 - 1-04	Camross	O'Moore Park
