= 1985 Laois Senior Hurling Championship =

Annual hurling competition season

- Champions: Camross (16th title); P. J. Cuddy (captain)
- Runners-up: Portlaoise

The 1985 Laois Senior Hurling Championship was the 92nd staging of the Laois Senior Hurling Championship since its establishment by the Laois County Board in 1888.

Portlaoise were the defending champions.

The final was played on 10 November 1985 at O'Moore Park in Portlaoise, between Camross and Portlaoise, in what was their fifth meeting in the final overall. Camross won the match by 1–05 to 0–07 to claim their 16th championship title overall and a first title in five years.

== Results ==
=== Final ===
10 November 1985 Final	Camross	1-05 - 0-07	Portlaoise	O'Moore Park
