= 1925 Laois Senior Hurling Championship =

Annual hurling competition season

- Champions: Rathdowney (14th title); Jack Daly (captain)
- Runners-up: Clonad; Tom Brady (captain)

The 1925 Laois Senior Hurling Championship was the 32nd staging of the Laois Senior Hurling Championship since its establishment by the Laois County Board in 1888.

Kilcotton were the defending champions.

The final was played on 27 September 1925 at the County Grounds in Portlaoise, between Rathdowney and Clonad, in what was their first ever meeting in the final. Rathdowney won the match by 3–03 to 2–01 to claim their 14th championship title overall and a first title in three years.

== Results ==
=== Final ===
27 September 1925 Final	Rathdowney	3-03 - 2-01	Clonad	County Grounds
