= 1946 Laois Senior Hurling Championship =

Annual hurling competition season

- Champions: Clonad (5th title)
- Runners-up: Abbeyleix

The 1946 Laois Senior Hurling Championship was the 53rd staging of the Laois Senior Hurling Championship since its establishment by the Laois County Board in 1888.

Abbeyleix were the defending champions.

The final was played on 24 November 1946 at O'Moore Park in Portlaoise, between Clonad and Abbeyleix, in what was their fourth meeting in the final overall. Clonad won the match by 3–04 to 2–03 to claim their fifth championship title overall and a first title in nine years.

== Results ==
=== Final ===
24 November 1946 Final	Clonad	3-04 - 2-03	Abbeyleix	O'Moore Park
