= 1936 Laois Senior Hurling Championship =

Annual hurling competition season

- Champions: Rathdowney (17th title); Harry Gray (captain)
- Runners-up: Kilcotton

The 1936 Laois Senior Hurling Championship was the 43rd staging of the Laois Senior Hurling Championship since its establishment by the Laois County Board in 1888.

Clonad were the defending champions.

The final was played on 2 May 1937 at O'Moore Park in Portlaoise, between Rathdwoeny and Kilcotton, in what was their eighth meeting in the final overall. Rathdowney won the match by 6–04 to 1–05 to claim their third championship title overall and a first title in two years.

== Results ==
=== Semi-finals ===
30 August 1936 Semi-final	Rathdowney	4-04 - 2-06	Clonad	O'Moore Park

4 April 1937 Semi-final	Kilcotton	6-02 - 2-01	Errill	O'Moore Park

=== Final ===
2 May 1937 Final	Rathdowney	6-04 - 1-05	Kilcotton	O'Moore Park
