= 1918 Laois Senior Hurling Championship =

Annual hurling competition season

- Champions: Ballygeehan (5th title); Jack Finlay (captain)
- Runners-up: Rathdowney; Paddy Daly (captain)

The 1918 Laois Senior Hurling Championship was the 25th staging of the Laois Senior Hurling Championship since its establishment by the Laois County Board in 1888.

Ballygeehan were the defending champions.

The final was played on 8 June 1919 at the County Grounds in Portlaoise, between Ballygeehan and Rathdowney. Ballygeehan won the match by 3–00 to 0–00 to claim their fifth consecutive championship title.

== Results ==
=== Final ===
| 8 June 1919 Final | Ballygeehan | 3-00 - 0-00 | Rathdowney | County Grounds |
