= 1935 Laois Senior Hurling Championship =

Annual hurling competition season

- Champions: Clonad (3rd title)
- Runners-up: Rathdowney

The 1935 Laois Senior Hurling Championship was the 42nd staging of the Laois Senior Hurling Championship since its establishment by the Laois County Board in 1888.

Abbeyleix were the defending champions.

The final was played on 15 March 1936 at O'Moore Park in Portlaoise, between Clonad and Rathdwoeny, in what was their fourth meeting in the final overall. Clonad won the match by 7–03 to 1–05 to claim their third championship title overall and a first title in two years.

== Results ==
=== Final ===
15 March 1936 Final	Clonad	7-03 - 1-05	Rathdowney	O'Moore Park
