= 1949 Laois Senior Hurling Championship =

Annual hurling competition season

- Champions: Abbeyleix (8th title); Dan Cranny (captain)
- Runners-up: Clonad

The 1949 Laois Senior Hurling Championship was the 56th staging of the Laois Senior Hurling Championship since its establishment by the Laois County Board in 1888.

Clonad were the defending champions.

The final was played on 13 November 1949 at O'Moore Park in Portlaoise, between Abbeyleix and Clonad, in what was their fourth consecutive meeting in the final. Abbeyleix won the match by 7–03 to 5–03 to claim their eighth championship title overall and a first title in four years.

== Results ==
=== Semi-finals ===
25 September 1949 Semi-final	Clonad	2-08 - 1-05	Rovers	O'Moore Park

30 October 1949 Semi-final	Abbeyleix	5-05 - 2-03	Kyle	St Fintan's Park

=== Final ===
13 November 1949 Final	Abbeyleix	7-03 - 5-03	Clonad	O'Moore Park
