= 1898 Laois Senior Hurling Championship =

Annual hurling competition season

- Champions: Rathdowney (3rd title); John Maher (captain)
- Runners-up: Ballacolla

The 1898 Laois Senior Hurling Championship was the sixth staging of the Laois Senior Hurling Championship since its establishment by the Laois County Board in 1888.

Harristown were the defending champions.

The final was played between Rathdowney and Ballacolla, in what was their first ever meeting in the final. Rathdowney won the match by 2–10 to 0–01 to claim their third championship title overall and a first title in nine years.

== Results ==
=== Final ===
Final	Rathdowney	2-10 - 0-01	Ballacolla
