= 1890 Laois Senior Hurling Championship =

Annual hurling competition season

- Champions: Clonaslee (1st title)
- Runners-up: Rathdowney

The 1890 Laois Senior Hurling Championship was the third staging of the Laois Senior Hurling Championship since its establishment by the Laois County Board in 1888.

Rathdowney were the defending champions.

The final was played between Clonaslee and Rathdowney, in what was their first ever meeting in the final. Clonaslee won the match by 1–02 to 1–00 to claim their first ever championship title.

== Results ==
=== Final ===
Final	Clonaslee	1-02 - 1-00	Rathdowney
