= Tomás Keyes =

Irish hurler

Personal information
- Native name: Tomás Mac Aoidh (Irish)
- Nickname: Mossy
- Born: 2002 (age 23–24) Camross, County Laois, Ireland

Sport
- Sport: Hurling
- Position: Left corner-forward
Club
- Years: Club
- Camross
Club titles
- Laois titles: 1
College
- Years: College
- 2020-2024: SETU Carlow
College titles
- Fitzgibbon titles: 0
Inter-county
- Years: County
- 2022–present: Laois
Inter-county titles
- Leinster titles: 0
- All-Irelands: 0
- NHL: 0
- All Stars: 0

Tomás Keyes (born 2002) is an Irish hurler. At club level he plays with Camross and at inter-county level with the Laois senior hurling team.

== Career ==
Keyes attended Mountrath Community School and played in all grades of hurling during his time there. He won a Leinster PPS SA1HC title in 2018, following a 1–11 to 1–09 defeat of Ardscoil Rís in the final. Keyes later played with the SETU Carlow team in the Fitzgibbon Cup.

At club level, Keyes first played for Camross at juvenile and underage levels. He progressed to adult level and won a Laois SHC medal in 2023, as well as being named man of the match, after scoring 3–06 in the defeat of Abbeyleix in the final.

At inter-county level, Keyes first played for Laois as a member of the minor team in 2019. He later spent three consecutive years with the under-20 team. Keyes joined the senior team in 2022.

Keyes claimed his first silverware in 2024, when Laois beat Carlow to win the National Hurling League Division 2A title. He added a Division 2 medal to his collection in 2026. Keyes was part of the Laois team that lost consecutive Joe McDonagh Cup finals to Offaly (2024) and Kildare (2025). He lined out at left corner-forward when Laois beat Carlow by 1–27 to 1–18 to win the Joe McDonagh Cup title in June 2026.

== Honours ==
Mountrath Community School

- Leinster PPS Junior A1 Hurling Championship (1): 2018

Camross

- Laois Senior Hurling Championship (1): 2023

Laois

- Joe McDonagh Cup (1): 2026
- National Hurling League Division 2 (1): 2026
- National Hurling League Division 2A (1): 2024
