= 1897 Laois Senior Hurling Championship =

Annual hurling competition season

1891 Laois Senior Hurling Championship
- Champions: Harristown (1st title); Martin Sheil (captain)
- Runners-up: Rathdowney; John Maher (captain)

The 1897 Laois Senior Hurling Championship was the fifth staging of the Laois Senior Hurling Championship since its establishment by the Laois County Board in 1888.

Clonaslee were the defending champions.

The final was played on 28 November 1897 at the Wolfhill Grounds, between Harristown and Rathdowney, in what was their first ever meeting in the final. Harristown won the match by 0–08 to 1–01 to claim their first ever championship title.

== Results ==
=== Final ===
28 November 1897 Final	Harristown	0-08 - 1-01	Rathdowney	Wolfhill Grounds
