= 2018 Laois Senior Hurling Championship =

Annual hurling competition season

- Teams: 8
- Champions: Camross (26th title); Niall Holmes (captain); Danny Owens (manager)
- Runners-up: Rathdowney–Errill

The 2018 Laois Senior Hurling Championship was the 125th staging of the Laois Senior Hurling Championship since its establishment by the Laois County Board in 1888.

Camross entered the championship as the defending champions.

The final was played on 7 October 2018 at O'Moore Park in Port Laoise, between Camross and Rathdowney–Errill, in what was their third meeting in the final overall and a first meeting in three years. Camross won the match by 3-14 to 1-19 to claim their 26th championship title overall and a second consecutive title.

== Knockout stage ==
=== Semi-finals ===
23 September 2018 Semi-final	Camross	1-17 - 1-12	Borris–Kilcotton	O'Moore Park

23 September 2018 Semi-final	Rathdowney–Errill	1-15 - 0-10	Ballinakill	O'Moore Park

=== Final ===
7 October 2018 Final	Camross	2-15 - 0-19	Rathdowney–Errill	O'Moore Park
	Z Keenan (0-7, 0-5f); M Dowling (1-1), E Gaughan (1-0), C Collier (0-3), M Burke (0-1); T Burke (0-1); D Delaney (0-1), L Burke (0-1).		M Kavanagh (0-12, 0-10f), T Dowling (0-3), P McCane (0-1), R King (0-1), P Purcell (0-1), B McGinley (0-1).
