= 2009 Laois Senior Hurling Championship =

Annual hurling competition season

- Teams: 13
- Champions: Clough–Ballacolla (1st title); Mick McEvoy (captain); Raymie Ryan (manager)
- Runners-up: Portlaoise; Tommy Fitzgerald (captain); Philip Ryan (manager)

The 2009 Laois Senior Hurling Championship was the 116th staging of the Laois Senior Hurling Championship since its establishment by the Laois County Board in 1888.

Rathdowney–Errill entered the championship as the defending champions.

The final was played on 11 October 2009 at O'Moore Park in Port Laoise, between Clough–Ballacolla and Portlaoise, in what was their first ever meeting in the final. Clough–Ballacolla won the match by 2–13 to 1–10 to claim their first ever championship title.

== Results ==
=== Quarter-finals ===
12 September 2009 Quarter-final	Ballinakill	2-14 - 1-10	Camross	O'Moore Park
	D Carter 1-4, E Jackman 0-5, E Dwyer 0-3, S Dwyer 1-0, J Walsh 0-1, B Dunne 0-1.		N Holmes 0-5, J Phelan 1-0, F Hogan 0-2, A Collier 0-1, J Palmer 0-1, C Delaney 0-1.

12 September 2009 Quarter-final	Clough–Ballacolla	2-15 - 3-12	St Fintan's, Mountrath	O'Moore Park
	W Dunphy 1-3, W Hyland 0-6, T Delaney 1-1, S Hanlon 0-2, M Dunphy 0-1, D Bergin 0-1, JA Delaney 0-1.		M Rice 2-0, D Russell 0-4, J Coogan 1-0, D Duggan 0-3, K O'Keeffe 0-1, P Rice 0-1, J Hyland 0-1, M Meade 0-1, M Boyhan 0-1.

13 September 2009 Quarter-final	Castletown	3-15 - 1-17	Rathdowney–Errill	O'Moore Park
	D Cuddy 1-10, J Palmer 2-2, G Reddin 0-1, J Gaughan 0-1, P Cuddy 0-1.		J Fitzpatrick 0-6, A Delaney 0-5, J Purcell 1-1, J Phelan 0-2, E Meagher 0-2, E Houlihan 0-1.

13 September 2009 Quarter-final	Portlaoise	1-14 - 0-12	The Harps	O'Moore Park
	N Costelloe 1-6, T Fitzgerald 0-4, C Healy 0-1,, E Whelan 0-1, B Fitzgerald 0-1, D O'Mahoney 0-1.		J Brophy 0-8, S Donoghue 0-1, B Dunne 0-1, J Dunne 0-1, G Delahunty 0-1.

16 September 2009 Quarter-final replay	Clough–Ballacolla	0-20 - 1-13	St Fintan's, Mountrath	O'Moore Park
	W Hyland 0-5, M Dunphy 0-4, W Dunphy 0-4, D Bergin 0-3, P McEvoy 0-2, M McEvoy 0-1, T Delaney 0-1.		D Russell 0-6, J Hyland 0-4, T Russell 1-0, M Boyhan 0-1, D Lanham 0-1, K O'Keeffe 0-1.

=== Semi-finals ===
27 September 2009 Semi-final	Clough–Ballacolla	2-17 - 1-13	Ballinakill	O'Moore Park
	D Bergin 1-5, W Hyland 0-6, M Dunphy 1-1, T Delaney 0-3, W Dunphy 0-1, M McEvoy 0-1.		E Jackman 0-7, F O'Shaughnessy 1-1, T Walsh 0-2, J Walsh 0-2, D Carter 0-1.

27 September 2009 Semi-final	Portlaoise	1-18 - 3-09	Castletown	O'Moore Park
	B Fitzgerald 1-1, N Costello 0-4, E Costello 0-4, S Norton 0-3, T Fennelly 0-2, K Murphy 0-2, T Byrne 0-1, D Delaney 0-1.		D Cuddy 2-5, C Dunne 1-0, C Cuddy 0-1, P Mullaney 0-1, J Palmer 0-1, J Gaughan 0-1.

=== Final ===
11 October 2009 Final	Clough–Ballacolla	2-13 - 1-10	Portlaoise	O'Moore Park
	W Hyland (2-3, 1-0f, 1-0pen, 0-1f), D Bergin (0-5, 0-4f), M Dunphy (0-3), W Dunphy (0-2).	Report	T Fennelly (1-1), T Fitzgerald (0-3, 0-3f), D Delaney (0-3, 0-2f, 0-1 '65'); E Whelan (0-1), K Murphy (0-1, 1f); D O'Mahony (0-1).
