= 1932 Laois Senior Hurling Championship =

Annual hurling competition season

- Champions: Abbeyleix (2nd title)
- Runners-up: Clonad

The 1932 Laois Senior Hurling Championship was the 39th staging of the Laois Senior Hurling Championship since its establishment by the Laois County Board in 1888.

Rathdowney were the defending champions.

The final was played on 13 November 1932 at the County Grounds in Portlaoise, between Abbeyleix and Clonad, in what was their first ever meeting in the final. Abbeyleix won the match by 2–04 to 1–02 to claim their second championship title overall and a first title in five years.

== Results ==
=== Final ===
13 November 1932 Final	Abbeyleix	2-04 - 1-02	Clonad	County Grounds
