= 1972 Laois Senior Hurling Championship =

Annual hurling competition season

- Champions: Borris-in-Ossory (5th title); Brendan Dollard (captain)
- Runners-up: Ballyfin

The 1972 Laois Senior Hurling Championship was the 79th staging of the Laois Senior Hurling Championship since its establishment by the Laois County Board in 1888.

Camross were the defending champions.

The final was played on 10 September 1972 at O'Moore Park in Portlaoise, between Borris-in-Ossory and Ballyfin, in what was their first ever meeting in the final. Borris-in-Ossory won the match by 4–06 to 2–06 to claim their fifth championship title overall and a first title in 11 years.

== Results ==
=== Final ===
10 September 1972 Final	Borris-in-Ossory	4-06 - 2-06	Ballyfin	O'Moore Park
