= 2017 Laois Senior Hurling Championship =

Annual hurling competition season

- Champions: Camross (25th title); Zane Keenan (captain); Joe Phelan (captain); Arien Delaney (manager)
- Runners-up: Clough–Ballacolla; Canice Coonan (captain); Tommy Buggy (manager)

The 2017 Laois Senior Hurling Championship was the 124th staging of the Laois Senior Hurling Championship since its establishment by the Laois County Board in 1888.

Borris–Kilcotton were the defending champions.

The final was played on 24 September 2017 at O'Moore Park in Portlaoise, between Camross and Clough–Ballacolla, in what was their second meeting in the final overall. Camross won the match by 3–14 to 1–19 to claim their 25th championship title overall and a first title in four years.

== Results ==
=== Semi-finals ===
9 September 2017 Semi-final	Clough–Ballacolla	0-18 - 0-10	Abbeyleix	O'Moore Park

10 September 2017 Semi-final	Camross	2-12 - 1-09	Borris–Kilcotton	O'Moore Park

=== Final ===
24 September 2017 Final	Camross	3-14 - 1-19	Clough–Ballacolla	O'Moore Park
