= 2013 Laois Senior Hurling Championship =

Annual hurling competition season

- Champions: Camross (24th title); Tomás Burke (captain); Arien Delaney (manager)
- Runners-up: Borris–Kilcotton; Paul Drennan (captain); Tommy Buggy (manager)

The 2013 Laois Senior Hurling Championship was the 120th staging of the Laois Senior Hurling Championship since its establishment by the Laois County Board in 1888.

Rathdowney–Errill were the defending champions.

The final was played on 29 September 2013 at O'Moore Park in Portlaoise, between Camross and Borris–Kilcotton, in what was their first ever meeting in the final. Camross won the match by 2–12 to 1–12 to claim their 24th championship title overall and a first title in six years.

== Results ==
=== Semi-finals ===
15 September 2013 Semi-final	Borris–Kilcotton	1-16 - 0-11	Clough–Ballacolla	O'Moore Park

15 September 2013 Semi-final	Camross	1-14 - 1-11	Portlaoise	O'Moore Park

=== Final ===
29 September 2013 Final	Camross	2-12 - 1-12	Borris–Kilcotton	O'Moore Park
