= 1987 Laois Senior Hurling Championship =

Annual hurling competition season

- Champions: Portlaoise (7th title); Seán Bergin (captain); Pat Critchley (manager)
- Runners-up: Clonad; Andy Dunne (captain); Pat Roe (manager)

The 1987 Laois Senior Hurling Championship was the 94th staging of the Laois Senior Hurling Championship since its establishment by the Laois County Board in 1888.

Camross were the defending champions.

The final was played on 13 September 1987 at O'Moore Park in Portlaoise, between Portlaoise and Clonad, in what was their second meeting in the final overall. Portlaoise won the match by 2–13 to 1–05 to claim their seventh championship title overall and a first title in three years.

== Results ==
=== Final ===
13 September 1987 Final	Portlaoise	2-13 - 1-05	Clonad	O'Moore Park
