= 1964 Laois Senior Hurling Championship =

Annual hurling competition season

- Champions: Cullohill (2nd title)
- Runners-up: Camross

The 1964 Laois Senior Hurling Championship was the 71st staging of the Laois Senior Hurling Championship since its establishment by the Laois County Board in 1888.

Camross were the defending champions.

The final was played on 29 November 1964 at O'Moore Park in Portlaoise, between Cullohill and Camross, in what was their first-ever meeting in the final. Cullohill won the match by 4–04 to 4–03 to claim their second championship title overall and a first title in nine years.

== Results ==
=== Final ===
29 November 1964 Final	Cullohill	4-04 - 4-03	Camross	O'Moore Park
