= 1916 Laois Senior Hurling Championship =

Annual hurling competition season

- Champions: Ballygeehan (2nd title); Jack Finlay (captain)
- Runners-up: Rathdowney; Peter Daly (captain)

The 1916 Laois Senior Hurling Championship was the 23rd staging of the Laois Senior Hurling Championship since its establishment by the Laois County Board in 1888.

Ballygeehan were the defending champions.

The final was played on 29 April 1917 at the County Grounds in Portlaoise, between Ballygeehan and Rathdowney. Ballygeehan won the match by 4–04 to 2–00 to claim their third consecutive championship title.

== Results ==
=== Final ===
29 April 1917 Final	Ballygeehan	4-04 - 2-00	Rathdowney	County Grounds
