= 1947 Laois Senior Hurling Championship =

Annual hurling competition season

- Champions: Clonad (6th title)
- Runners-up: Abbeyleix

The 1947 Laois Senior Hurling Championship was the 54th staging of the Laois Senior Hurling Championship since its establishment by the Laois County Board in 1888.

Clonad were the defending champions.

The final was played on 24 November 1946 at O'Moore Park in Portlaoise, between Clonad and Abbeyleix, in what was their fifth meeting in the final overall. Clonad won the match by 3–08 to 2–04 to claim their sixth championship title overall and a second consecutive title.

== Results ==
=== Final ===
19 October 1947 Final	Clonad	3-08 - 2-04	Abbeyleix	O'Moore Park
