= 1891 Laois Senior Hurling Championship =

Annual hurling competition season

- Champions: Clonaslee (2nd title)
- Runners-up: Aghaboe

The 1891 Laois Senior Hurling Championship was the fourth staging of the Laois Senior Hurling Championship since its establishment by the Laois County Board in 1888.

Clonaslee were the defending champions.

The final was scheduled to be played between Clonaslee and Aghaboe, in what would have been their first ever meeting in the final. Aghaboe conceded a walkover and Clonaslee were awarded the match to claim their second consecutive championship title.

== Results ==
=== Final ===
Final	Clonaslee	w/o - scr.	Aghaboe
