= 1915 Laois Senior Hurling Championship =

Annual hurling competition season

- Champions: Ballygeehan (2nd title); Jack Finlay (captain)

The 1915 Laois Senior Hurling Championship was the 22nd staging of the Laois Senior Hurling Championship since its establishment by the Laois County Board in 1888.

Ballygeehan were the defending champions and successfully defended their title.
