= 1914 Laois Senior Hurling Championship =

Annual hurling competition season

- Champions: Ballygeehan (1st title); Jack Finlay (captain)
- Runners-up: Kilcotton; Jack Carroll (captain)

The 1914 Laois Senior Hurling Championship was the 21st staging of the Laois Senior Hurling Championship since its establishment by the Laois County Board in 1888.

Kilcotton were the defending champions.

The final, a replay, was played on 9 May 1915 at the Ballacolla Grounds, between Ballygeehan and Kilcotton, in what was their first ever meeting in the final. Ballygeehan won the match by 4–05 to 2–00 to claim their first ever championship title.

== Results ==
=== Final ===
28 March 1915 Final	Ballygeehan	0-09 - 0-09	Kilcotton	Ballacolla Grounds

=== Final replay ===
9 May 1915 Final replay	Ballygeehan	4-05 - 2-00	Kilcotton	Ballacolla Grounds
