= 1931 Laois Senior Hurling Championship =

Annual hurling competition season

- Champions: Rathdowney (16th title); Jack Daly (captain)
- Runners-up: Clonad

The 1931 Laois Senior Hurling Championship was the 38th staging of the Laois Senior Hurling Championship since its establishment by the Laois County Board in 1888.

Clonad were the defending champions.

The final was played on 17 April 1932 at O'Moore Park in Portlaoise, between Rathdowney and Clonad, in what was their second meeting in the final overall. Rathdowney won the match by 2–03 to 1–04 to claim their 16th championship title overall and a first title in five years.

== Results ==
=== Final ===
17 April 1932 Final	Rathdowney	2-03 - 1-04	Clonad	O'Moore Park
