= 2007 Laois Senior Hurling Championship =

Annual hurling competition season

- Champions: Camross (23rd title); Fran Hogan (captain)
- Runners-up: Portlaoise; Eoin Browne (captain)

The 2007 Laois Senior Hurling Championship was the 114th staging of the Laois Senior Hurling Championship since its establishment by the Laois County Board in 1888.

Rathdowney–Errill were the defending champions.

The final was played on 30 September 2007 at O'Moore Park in Portlaoise, between Camross and Portlaoise, in what was their 10th meeting in the final overall. Camross won the match by 5–09 to 2–11 to claim their 23rd championship title overall and a first title in 11 years.

== Results ==
=== Semi-finals ===
15 September 2007 Semi-final	Camross	3-14 - 2-15	The Harps	O'Moore Park

15 September 2007 Semi-final	Portlaoise	3-14 - 2-06	Clough–Ballacolla	O'Moore Park

=== Final ===
30 September 2007 Final	Camross	5-09 - 2-11	Portlaoise	O'Moore Park
