= 1994 Laois Senior Hurling Championship =

Annual hurling competition season

- Sponsor: Downey Auto Stop
- Champions: Camross (21st title); Tom Delaney (captain)
- Runners-up: Clonad

The 1994 Laois Senior Hurling Championship was the 101st staging of the Laois Senior Hurling Championship since its establishment by the Laois County Board in 1888.

Camross were the defending champions.

The final was played on 25 September 1994 at O'Moore Park in Portlaoise, between Camross and Clonad, in what was their third meeting in the final overall. Camross won the match by 2–08 to 0–03 to claim their 21st championship title overall and a second consecutive title.

== Results ==
=== Semi-finals ===
11 September 1994 Semi-final	Camross	2-08 - 0-08	Castletown	O'Moore Park

11 September 1994 Semi-final	Clonad	0-13 - 0-09	Portlaoise	O'Moore Park

=== Final ===
25 September 1994 Final	Camross	2-08 - 0-03	Clonad	O'Moore Park
