= 1977 All-Ireland Senior Club Hurling Championship final =

Hurling match

1977 All-Ireland Senior Club Hurling Championship Final
- Event: 1976–77 All-Ireland Senior Club Hurling Championship
Glen Rovers	Camross
2-12	0-8
- Date: 27 March 1977
- Venue: Croke Park, Dublin
- Referee: John Moloney (Tipperary)
- Attendance: 4,000

The 1977 All-Ireland Senior Club Hurling Championship final was a hurling match played at Croke Park on 27 March 1977 to determine the winners of the 1976–77 All-Ireland Senior Club Hurling Championship, the seventh season of the All-Ireland Senior Club Hurling Championship, a tournament organised by the Gaelic Athletic Association for the champion clubs of the four provinces of Ireland. The final was contested by Glen Rovers of Cork and Camross of Laois, with Glen Rovers winning by 2–12 to 0–8.

In the first and only championship meeting between the two teams, Glen Rovers, with nine survivors from their previous victory in 1973, were the hot favourites for the title. Camross, which featured eight members of the Cuddy family, held the Glen in the first half. Glen Rovers powered on after the interval to secure a ten-point victory.

Glen Rovers' All-Ireland victory was their first since 1973. The win gave them their second All-Ireland title over all and put them joint first on the all-time roll of honour along with Blackrock.

Camross' All-Ireland appearance remains the only time that the Laois champions qualified for the final.

== Match ==
=== Details ===
27 March 1977

Glen Rovers	2-12 - 0-8	Camross
T Collins 2-1, P Harte 0-3, V Marshall 0-2, R Crowley 0-2, P O'Doherty 0-1, P Horgan 0-1, JJ O'Neill 0-1, D Clifford 0-1.		F Keenan 0-6, S Cuddy 0-1, S Bergin 0-1.

Semple Stadium Thurles
Referee: J Moloney (Tipperary)

Glen Rovers	Camross
