= 1907 Laois Senior Hurling Championship =

Annual hurling competition season

- Champions: Rathdowney (8th title); Peter Daly (captain)
- Runners-up: Ballacolla; John Byrne (captain)

The 1907 Laois Senior Hurling Championship was the 14th staging of the Laois Senior Hurling Championship since its establishment by the Laois County Board in 1888.

Kilcotton were the defending champions.

The final was played on 3 May 1908, between Rathdowney and Ballacolla, in what was their second meeting in the final overall. Rathdowney won the match by 4–10 to 2–09 to claim their eighth championship title overall and a first title in four years.

== Results ==
=== Final ===
3 May 1908 Final	Rathdowney	4-10 - 2-09	Ballacolla
