= 1922 Laois Senior Hurling Championship =

Annual hurling competition season

- Champions: Rathdowney (13th title); Jack Daly (captain)
- Runners-up: Portlaoise

The 1922 Laois Senior Hurling Championship was the 29th staging of the Laois Senior Hurling Championship since its establishment by the Laois County Board in 1888.

Rathdowney were the defending champions.

The final was played on 22 April 1923 at the County Grounds in Portlaoise, between Rathdowney and Portlaoise, in what was their first ever meeting in the final. Rathdowney won the match by 4–03 to 2–01 to claim their 13th championship title overall and a second consecutive title.

== Results ==
=== Final ===
22 April 1923 Final	Rathdowney	4-03 - 2-01	Portlaoise	County Grounds
