= 1899 Laois Senior Hurling Championship =

Annual hurling competition season

- Champions: Rathdowney (4th title); John Maher (captain)
- Runners-up: Knockaroo

The 1899 Laois Senior Hurling Championship was the seventh staging of the Laois Senior Hurling Championship since its establishment by the Laois County Board in 1888.

Rathdowney were the defending champions.

The final was played between Rathdowney and Knockaroo, in what was their second meeting in the final overall. Knockaroo won the match by 1–11 to 1–06, however, they were stripped of the title after an objection by Rathdowney, in regard to illegal players, was upheld. Rathdowney were awarded their fourth championship title overall and a second consecutive title.

== Results ==
=== Final ===
Final	Rathdowney	1-06 - 1-11 (void)	Knockaroo
