= 1902 Laois Senior Hurling Championship =

Annual hurling competition season

- Champions: Rathdowney (6th title); Peter Daly (captain)

The 1902 Laois Senior Hurling Championship was the ninth staging of the Laois Senior Hurling Championship since its establishment by the Laois County Board in 1888.

Rathdowney were the defending champions and retained the title to secure their sixth championship title overall.
