= Denis Walsh (Cloughduv hurler) =

Irish hurler

Personal information
- Native name: Donncha Breathnach (Irish)
- Born: 1961 (age 64–65) Beal atha an Gaorthaidh, County Cork, Ireland

Sport
- Sport: Hurling
- Position: Right wing-forward
Clubs
- Years: Club
- Cloughduv; St Finbarr's
Club titles
- Cork titles: 1
Inter-county*
Years	County	Apps (scores)
1984–1986	Cork	6 (1–10)
Inter-county titles
- Munster titles: 2
- All-Irelands: 1
- NHL: 0
- All Stars: 0
- *Inter County team apps and scores correct as of 22:52, 17 May 2015.

Denis Walsh (born 1961) is an Irish former hurler who played as a midfielder at senior level for the Cork county team.

== Playing career ==
Born in Cloughduv, County Cork, Walsh arrived on the inter-county scene at the age of seventeen when he first linked up with the Cork minor team, before joining the under-21 and junior sides. He made his senior debut during the 1984 championship. Walsh immediately became a regular member of the starting fifteen and won two Munster SHC medals.

At club level, Walsh is a one-time championship medallist with St Finbarr's, after beginning his career with Cloughduv.

Throughout his career, Walsh made six championship appearances. His retirement came following the conclusion of the 1986 championship.

He made his county minor debut in 1978 and was a dual county minor in 1979.

== Honours ==
During his career, Walsh won the following:

- Munster & All-Ireland Minor Hurling 1978 & 1979
- Munster & All-Ireland U21 Hurling 1982
- Munster & All-Ireland Junior Hurling 1983
- Munster & All-Ireland Senior Hurling 1984
- Ford 1984 Centenary Cup (hurling)
