= 1967 Laois Senior Hurling Championship =

Annual hurling competition season

- Champions: Camross (5th title); Tim Cuddy (captain)
- Runners-up: Clonad

The 1967 Laois Senior Hurling Championship was the 74th staging of the Laois Senior Hurling Championship since its establishment by the Laois County Board in 1888.

Camross were the defending champions.

The final was played on 10 September 1967 at O'Moore Park in Portlaoise, between Camross and Clonad, in what was their first ever meeting in the final. Camross won the match by 5–04 to 3–04 to claim their fifth championship title overall and a third consecutive title.

== Results ==
=== Final ===
10 September 1967 Final	Camross	5-04 - 3-04	Clonad	O'Moore Park
