= 1921 Laois Senior Hurling Championship =

Annual hurling competition season

- Champions: Rathdowney (12th title); Jack Daly (captain)
- Runners-up: Kilcotton; Jack Carroll (captain)

The 1921 Laois Senior Hurling Championship was the 28th staging of the Laois Senior Hurling Championship since its establishment by the Laois County Board in 1888.

Kilcotton were the defending champions.

The final was played at the County Grounds in Portlaoise on 16 October 1921, between Rathdowney and Kilcotton, in what was their sixth meeting in the final overall. Rathdowney won the match by 3–00 to 1–03 to claim their 12th championship title overall and a first title in nine years.

== Results ==
=== Final ===
16 October 1921 Final	Rathdowney	3-00 - 1-03	Kilcotton	County Grounds
