= 1976–77 All-Ireland Senior Club Hurling Championship =

All-Ireland Senior Club Hurling Championship 1976–77
Championship Details
- Dates: 24 October 1976 – 27 March 1977
- Teams: 26

All Ireland Champions
- Winners: Glen Rovers (2nd win)
- Captain: Finbarr O'Neill
- Manager: Johnny Clifford

All Ireland Runners-up
- Runners-up: Camross

Provincial Champions
- Munster: Glen Rovers
- Leinster: Camross
- Ulster: Ballycran
- Connacht: Tremane

Championship Statistics
- Matches Played: 25
- Top Scorer: Frank Keenan (4–31)

The 1976–77 All-Ireland Senior Club Hurling Championship was the seventh staging of the All-Ireland Senior Club Hurling Championship, the Gaelic Athletic Association's premier inter-county club hurling tournament. The championship began on 24 October 1976 and ended on 27 March 1977.

James Stephens of Kilkenny were the defending champions, however, they were defeated by Camross in the Leinster final. Cúchulainn's of Armagh, Kilmessan of Meath, Kiltormer of Galway and St. Gabriel's of London were first-time participants.

On 27 March 1977, Glen Rovers won the championship following a 2–12 to 0–08 defeat of Camross in a replay of the All-Ireland final. This was their second All-Ireland title overall and their first in four championship seasons.

Frank Keenan of Camross was the championship's top scorer with 4–31.

== Results ==
=== Connacht Senior Club Hurling Championship ===
Quarter-finals

24 October 1976 Quarter-final	Ballinrobe	8–11 – 3–01	St. Mary's Kiltoghert	Flanagan Park, Ballinrobe
	P McQualter 3–3, P Frehan 3–0, J Hopkins 1–2, JJ Morrin 1–1, P Murphy 0–2, P Malone 0–2, M Varley 0–1.		J Martin 1–0, Brian McDermott 1–0, K Moran 1–0, A Browne 0–1.

21 November 1976 Quarter-final	Tremane	3–09 – 1–09	Craobh Rua	Athleague Sportsfield, Athleague
	J Kilroy 1–3, M Kilroy 1–2, M Reynolds 1–0, S Kilroy 0–2, J Keegan 0–1, J Coyne 0–1.		L Devlin 0–5, C Lawlor 1–1, J Kinsella 0–1, J Sheehy 0–1, T Barrett 0–1.

Semi-final

28 November 1976 Semi-final	Ballinrobe	2–02 – 4–09	Tremane	Flanagan Park, Ballinrobe
	JJ Hopkins 1–1, P McQualter 1–0, P Malone 0–1.		R Fallon 1–2, J Kilroy 0–4, M Reynolds 1–0, J Keegan 1–0, M O'Connell 1–0, S Kilroy 0–3.

Final

6 February 1977 Final	Tremane	2–07 – 1–09	Kiltormer	Mote Park, Knockadangan
	J Kilroy 1–2, M Kilroy 1–0, S Kilroy 0–3, R Fallon 0–1, J Coyne 0–1.		T Fury 0–5, A Fenton 1–1, P Glynn 0–1, S Kelly 0–1, M Hoare 0–1.

=== Leinster Senior Club Hurling Championship ===
First round

7 November 1976 First round	Kilmessan	4–06 – 4–10	Ardclough	Kilmessan
	E O'Neill 0–5, M Kerrigan 1–0, C Killion 1–0, J Walsh 1–0, C Maguire 1–0, O Collier 0–1.		J Walsh 1–6, B Burke 1–2, M Johnston 1–0, T Johnston 1–0, E Walsh 0–2.

7 November 1976 First round	Naomh Eoin	3–08 – 2–05	Carnew Emmets	Dr. Cullen Park, Carlow
	E Quirke 0–5, S Murphy 1–1, J Butler 1–1, L Fox 1–0, P Quirke 0–1.		S Doyle 2–1, P Doyle 0–2, M Doyle 0–1, M Lawlor 0–1.

14 November 1976 First round	Naomh Moninne	2–07 – 2–11	Lough Lene Gaels	Dundalk
	A McDonagh 2–0, A Byrne 0–4, A Kerrigan 0–1, L Toal 0–1, A Grey 0–1.		T Farrelly 1–3, M Cosgrove 1–1, S White 0–4, S Allen 0–2, F Carney 0–1.

Quarter-finals

7 November 1976 Quarter-final	Camross	2–10 – 2–08	Kilmacud Crokes	O'Moore Park, Portlaoise
	F Keenan 1–4, S Cuddy 1–0, M Carroll 0–2, S Collier 0–1, PJ Cuddy 0–1, Mick Cuddy 0–1, Martin Cuddy 0–1.		T Ring 0–4, M Fox 1–0, B Cooney 1–0, M Kenny 0–2, M Bermingham 0–2.

21 November 1976 Quarter-final	Ardclough	0–10 – 0–09	Buffer's Alley	Sallins Road, Naas
	J Walsh 0–5, B Burke 0–3, N Walsh 0–2.		M Butler 0–6, T Doran 0–2, J Harney 0–1.

21 November 1976 Quarter-final	Lough Lene Gaels	1–06 – 4–16	James Stephens	Collinstown
	T Farrelly 1–0, S Allen 0–3, S White 0–2, J Walsh 0–1.		M Crotty 1–2, D McCormack 1–2, J O'Brien 1–1, T McCormack 1–0, B Cody 0–3, M Taylor 0–3, L O'Brien 0–2, J McCormack 0–1, E Morrissey 0–1, D Murphy 0–1.

21 November 1976 Quarter-final	Naomh Eoin	3–09 – 2–16	St. Rynagh's	Dr. Cullen Park, Carlow
	E Quirke 1–4, L Fox 2–0, P Quirke 0–2, J O'Hara 0–1, J Doyle 0–1, M Nolan 0–1.		G Woods 2–3, PJ Whelehan 0–5, J Horan 0–3, D Devery 0–2, P Horan 0–2, E Fogarty 0–1.	Referee: P Johnston (Kilkenny)

Semi-finals

5 December 1976 Semi-final	Camross	2–08 – 1–08	St. Rynagh's	Kelly Daly Park, Rathdowney
	F Keenan 1–7, Martin Cuddy 1–0, Mick Carroll 0–1,		P Mulhaire 1–1, A Fogarty 0–4, P Horan 0–2, J Horan 0–1.	Referee: P Johnston (Kilkenny)

5 December 1976 Semi-final	James Stephens	1–16 – 0–06	Ardclough	Kelly Daly Park, Rathdowney
	L O'Brien 0–8, J O'Brien 1–0, M Crotty 0–3, J McCormack 0–2, B Cody 0–1, J Hennessy 0–1, D McCormack 0–1.		J Walsh 0–5, B Burke 0–1.

Final

6 February 1977 Final	Camross	3–09 – 1–14	James Stephens	Dr. Cullen Park, Carlow
	F Keenan 1–4, G Cuddy 1–0, T Keenan 1–0, S Cuddy 0–3, Martin Cuddy 0–1, Mick Cuddy 0–1.		J O'Brien 1–1, L O'Brien 0–4, M Crotty 0–3, M Taylor 0–2, J Hennessy 0–1, D McCormack 0–1, L McCormack 0–1, M Leahy 0–1.	Referee: G Kirwan (Offaly)

=== Munster Senior Club Hurling Championship ===
Quarter-finals

24 October 1976 Quarter-final	South Liberties	1–07 – 0–06	Portlaw	Gaelic Grounds, Limerick
	T Ryan 1–1, E Dooley 0–1, E Grimes 0–1, J Moynihan 0–1, D O'Sullivan 0–1, M Butler 0–1, J McKenna 0–1.		M Whelan 0–3, M Hickey 0–2, J Whelan 0–1.

7 November 1976 Quarter-final	Moneygall	2–10 – 2–12	Newmarket-on-Fergus	MacDonagh Park, Cloughjordan
	D Kennedy 2–2, P Ryan 0–4, E Ryan 0–2, S Ryan 0–1, P Sheedy 0–1.		T Ryan 1–2, C Woods 0–5, P McNamara 1–1, J Cullinane 0–2, J McNamara 0–1, G Commane 0–1.	Referee: N Duggan (Limerick)

Semi-finals

7 November 1976 Semi-final	Ballyduff	1–07 – 2–11	South Liberties	Ballyduff
	P Donegan 1–1, M Hennessy 0–3, J Byrne 0–2, G O'Sullivan 0–1.		E Grimes 1–4, E Dooley 1–0, T Ryan 0–3, K McKenna 0–2, J Moynihan 0–1, T Twomey 0–1.	Referee: W Horgan (Cork)

21 November 1976 Semi-final	Newmarket-on-Fergus	2–09 – 1–13	Glen Rovers	Fr. Murphy Memorial Park, Newmarket
	T Ryan 0–5, P McNamara 1–1, J McNamara 0–1, P O'Leary 0–1, C Woods 0–1.		M Ryan 1–3, P Horgan 0–3, P Harte 0–3, P Doherty 0–2, T Collins 0–2.

Final

19 December 1976 Final	South Liberties	2–04 – 2–08	Glen Rovers	Gaelic Grounds, Limerick
	E Dooley 1–0, T Ryan 1–0, E Grimes 0–2, T Moynihan 0–1, J McKenna 0–1.		P Harte 1–3, T O'Neill 1–0, D Coughlan 0–2, JJ O'Neill 0–2, P Doherty 0–1.	Referee: N Dalton (Waterford)

=== Ulster Senior Club Hurling Championship ===
Semi-finals

31 October 1976 Semi-final	Cúchulainn's	2–01 – 3–14	Ballycran	Athletic Grounds, Armagh

Final

21 November 1976 Final	Ballycran	0–08 – 0–07	O'Donovan Rossa	McKenna Park, Ballycran

=== All-Ireland Senior Club Hurling Championship ===
Quarter-final

6 February 1977 Quarter-final	Glen Rovers	1–13 – 1–06	St. Gabriel's	Páirc Uí Chaoimh, Cork
	M Ryan 0–4, T O'Neill 1–0, P Harte 0–3, F Cunningham 0–2, R Crowley 0–2, V Marshall 0–1, JJ O'Neill 0–1.		T Coakley 1–0, F Canning 0–3, F Gantley 0–2, T Burke 0–1.

Semi-finals

6 March 1977 Semi-final	Glen Rovers	7–10 – 0–03	Tremane	The Mardyke, Cork
	T Collins 5–2, P Horgan 1–1, P Harte 1–0, M Ryan 0–3, JJ O'Neill 0–2, V Marshall 0–1, F Cunningham 0–1.		S Kilroy 0–2, J Kilroy 0–1.	Referee: S O'Grady (Limerick)

6 March 1977 Semi-final	Camross	3–12 – 0–07	Ballycran	McKenna Park, Ballycran
	F Keenan 1–10, S Cuddy 1–1, G Cuddy 1–0, J Fitzpatrick 0–1.		B Mullen 0–4, C O'Flynn 0–1, B Gilmore 0–1, J Martin 0–1.	Referee: H McPoland (Antrim)

Final

27 March 1977 Final	Glen Rovers	2–12 – 0–08	Camross	Semple Stadium, Thurles
	T Collins 2–1, P Harte 0–3, V Marshall 0–2, R Crowley 0–2, JJ O'Neill 0–1, D Clifford 0–1, P O'Dpherty 0–1, P Horgan 0–1.		F Keenan 0–6, S Cuddy 0–1, S Bergin 0–1.	Referee: J Moloney (Tipperary)

== Championship statistics ==
=== Top scorers ===
Overall

Rank	Player	Club	Tally	Total	Matches	Average
1	Frank Keenan	Camross	4–31	43	5	8.60
2	Tom Collins	Glen Rovers	7-05	26	5	5.20
3	John Walsh	Ardclough	1–16	19	3	6.33
4	Patsy Harte	Glen Rovers	2–12	18	5	3.60
5	Jackie Kilroy	Tremane	2–10	16	4	4.00
6	Paul McQualter	Ballinrobe	4-03	15	2	7.50
7	Liam O'Brien	James Stephens	0–14	14	3	4.75
8	Mick Ryan	Glen Rovers	1–10	13	5	2.60
9	Éamonn Quirke	Naomh Eoin	1-09	12	2	6.00
10	Jimmy O'Brien	James Stephens	3-02	11	3	3.66
10	Seán Cuddy	Ballinrobe	2-05	11	5	2.20
10	Mick Crotty	James Stephens	1-08	11	3	3.66

Single game

Rank	Player	Club	Tally	Total	Opposition
1	Tom Collins	Glen Rovers	5-02	17	Tremane
2	Frank Keenan	Camross	1–10	13	Ballycran
3	Paul McQualter	Ballinrobe	3-03	12	St. Mary's Kiltoghert
4	Frank Keenan	Camross	1-07	10	St. Rynagh's
5	Pádraig Frehan	Ballinrobe	3-00	9	St. Mary's Kiltoghert
5	Ger Woods	St. Rynagh's	2-03	9	Naomh Eoin
5	John Walsh	Ardclough	1-06	9	Kilmessan
6	Donal Kennedy	Moneygall	2-02	8	Newmarket-on-Fergus
6	Liam O'Brien	James Stephens	0-08	8	Ardclough
7	Tom Collins	Glen Rovers	2-01	7	Camross
7	S. Doyle	Carnew Emmets	2-01	7	Naomh Eoin
7	Frank Keenan	Camross	1-04	7	Kilmacud Crokes
7	Éamonn Quirke	Naomh Eoin	1-04	7	St. Rynagh's
7	Frank Keenan	Camross	1-04	7	James Stephens
7	Éamonn Grimes	South Liberties	1-04	7	Ballyduff
