= 1917 Laois Senior Hurling Championship =

Annual hurling competition season

- Champions: Ballygeehan (4th title); Jack Finlay (captain)
- Runners-up: Kilcotton; Jack Carroll (captain)

The 1917 Laois Senior Hurling Championship was the 24th staging of the Laois Senior Hurling Championship since its establishment by the Laois County Board in 1888.

Ballygeehan were the defending champions.

The final was played on 16 June 1918 at the County Grounds in Portlaoise, between Ballygeehan and Kilcotton. Ballygeehan won the match by 3–00 to 2–02 to claim their fourth consecutive championship title.

== Results ==
=== Final ===
16 June 1918 Final	Ballygeehan	3-00 - 2-02	Kilcotton	County Grounds
