= Brian Campion =

Brian Campion may refer to:

- Brian Campion (politician) (born 1970), American politician in the Vermont House of Representatives
- Brian Campion (hurler) (born 1984), Irish hurler
