= 1965 Laois Senior Hurling Championship =

Annual hurling competition season

- Champions: Camross (3rd title)
- Runners-up: Cullohill

The 1965 Laois Senior Hurling Championship was the 72nd staging of the Laois Senior Hurling Championship since its establishment by the Laois County Board in 1888.

Cullohill were the defending champions.

The final was played on 19 September 1965 at O'Moore Park in Portlaoise, between Camross and Cullohill, in what was their second consecutive meeting in the final. Camross won the match by 3–10 to 3–06 to claim their third championship title overall and a first title in two years.

== Results ==
=== Final ===
19 September 1965 Final	Camross	3-10 - 3-06	Cullohill	O'Moore Park
