= 1973 Laois Senior Hurling Championship =

Annual hurling competition season

- Champions: Camross (9th title); Jack Carroll (captain)
- Runners-up: Borris-in-Ossory

The 1973 Laois Senior Hurling Championship was the 80th staging of the Laois Senior Hurling Championship since its establishment by the Laois County Board in 1888.

Borris-in-Ossory were the defending champions.

The final was played on 9 September 1973 at O'Moore Park in Portlaoise, between Camross and Borris-in-Ossory, in what was their first ever meeting in the final. Camross won the match by 5–13 to 0–14 to claim their ninth championship title overall and a first title in two years.

== Results ==
=== Final ===
| 9 September 1973 Final | Camross | 5-13 - 0-14 | Borris-in-Ossory | O'Moore Park |
