= 1908 Laois Senior Hurling Championship =

Annual hurling competition season

- Champions: Rathdowney (9th title); Peter Daly (captain)
- Runners-up: Clonaslee; John Naughton (captain)

The 1908 Laois Senior Hurling Championship was the 15th staging of the Laois Senior Hurling Championship since its establishment by the Laois County Board in 1888.

Rathdowney were the defending champions.

The final was played on 7 February 1909, between Rathdowney and Clonaslee, in what was their second meeting in the final overall. Rathdowney won the match to claim their ninth championship title overall and a second consecutive title.
