= 1901 Laois Senior Hurling Championship =

Annual hurling competition season

- Champions: Rathdowney (5th title); Peter Daly (captain)

The 1901 Laois Senior Hurling Championship was the eighth staging of the Laois Senior Hurling Championship since its establishment by the Laois County Board in 1888.

Rathdowney were the defending champions and retained the title to secure their fifth championship title overall. Rathdowney retained the title.
