= 1959 Laois Senior Hurling Championship =

Annual hurling competition season

- Champions: Camross (1st title); Fint Lalor (captain)
- Runners-up: Cuddagh

The 1959 Laois Senior Hurling Championship was the 66th staging of the Laois Senior Hurling Championship since its establishment by the Laois County Board in 1888.

Clonad were the defending champions, however, they were beaten by Cuddagh in the semi-finals.

The final was played on 1 November 1959 at O'Moore Park in Portlaoise, between Camross and Cuddagh, in what was their first ever meeting in the final. Camross won the match by 2–05 to 3–01 to claim their first ever championship title.

== Results ==
=== Final ===
1 November 1959 Final	Camross	2-05 - 3-01	Cuddagh	O'Moore Park
