= 1971 Laois Senior Hurling Championship =

Annual hurling competition season

- Champions: Camross (8th title); Jimmy Lyons (captain)
- Runners-up: Clonad

The 1971 Laois Senior Hurling Championship was the 78th staging of the Laois Senior Hurling Championship since its establishment by the Laois County Board in 1888.

Clonad were the defending champions.

The final was played on 12 September 1971 at O'Moore Park in Portlaoise, between Camross and Clonad, in what was their second meeting in the final. Camross won the match by 4–10 to 3–08 to claim their eighth championship title overall and a first title in two years.

== Results ==
=== Semi-finals ===
29 August 1971 Semi-final	Camross	5-09 - 2-05	Borris-in-Ossory	O'Moore Park

29 August 1971 Semi-final	Clonad	3-11 - 1-10	Clonaslee	O'Moore Park

=== Final ===
12 September 1971 Final	Camross	4-10 - 3-08	Clonad	O'Moore Park
