= 1927 Laois Senior Hurling Championship =

Annual hurling competition season

- Champions: Abbeyleix (1st title)
- Runners-up: Rathdowney

The 1927 Laois Senior Hurling Championship was the 34th staging of the Laois Senior Hurling Championship since its establishment by the Laois County Board in 1888.

Rathdowney were the defending champions.

The final was played on 23 October 1927 at the County Grounds in Portlaoise, between Abbeyleix and Rathdowney, in what was their first ever meeting in the final. Abbeyleix won the match by 6–03 to 3–02 to claim their first ever championship title.

== Results ==
=== Final ===
23 October 1927 Final	Abbeyleix	6-03 - 3-02	Rathdowney	County Grounds
