= 1963 Laois Senior Hurling Championship =

Annual hurling competition season

- Champions: Camross (2nd title); Fint Lalor (captain)
- Runners-up: St Canice's

The 1963 Laois Senior Hurling Championship was the 70th staging of the Laois Senior Hurling Championship since its establishment by the Laois County Board in 1888.

Clonad were the defending champions.

The final was played on 15 September 1963 at O'Moore Park in Portlaoise, between Camross and St Canice's, in what was their first ever meeting in the final. Camross won the match by 2–09 to 2–06 to claim their second championship title overall and a first title in four years.

== Results ==
=== Final ===
15 September 1963 Final	Camross	2-09 - 2-06	St Canice's	O'Moore Park
