= 1913 Laois Senior Hurling Championship =

Annual hurling competition season

- Champions: Kilcotton (5th title); Jack Carroll (captain)
- Runners-up: Rathdowney; Peter Daly (captain)

The 1913 Laois Senior Hurling Championship was the 20th staging of the Laois Senior Hurling Championship since its establishment by the Laois County Board in 1888.

Rathdowney were the defending champions.

The final, which went to two replays, was played on 25 January 1914 at the County Grounds in Portlaoise, between Kilcotton and Rathdowney, in what was their fourth meeting in the final overall. Kilcotton won the match by 3–02 to 2–01 to claim their fifth championship title overall and a first title in four years.

== Results ==
=== Final ===
14 December 1913 Final	Kilcotton	3-03 - 4-00	Rathdowney	County Grounds

=== Final replay ===
21 December 1913 Final replay	Kilcotton	3-02 - 3-02	Rathdowney	County Grounds

=== Final second replay ===
25 January 1914 Final second replay	Kilcotton	3-02 - 2-01	Rathdowney	County Grounds
