= 1966 Laois Senior Hurling Championship =

Annual hurling competition season

- Champions: Camross (4th title); Tim Cuddy (captain)
- Runners-up: Rathdowney

The 1966 Laois Senior Hurling Championship was the 73rd staging of the Laois Senior Hurling Championship since its establishment by the Laois County Board in 1888.

Camross were the defending champions.

The final was played on 13 November 1966 at O'Moore Park in Portlaoise, between Camross and Rathdowney, in what was their first ever meeting in the final. Camross won the match by 5–07 to 2–01 to claim their fourth championship title overall and a second consecutive title.

== Results ==
=== Final ===
13 November 1966 Final	Camross	5-07 - 2-01	Rathdowney	O'Moore Park
