= 1911 Laois Senior Hurling Championship =

Annual hurling competition season

- Champions: Rathdowney (10th title); Peter Daly (captain)
- Runners-up: Clonaslee; John Naughton (captain)

The 1911 Laois Senior Hurling Championship was the 18th staging of the Laois Senior Hurling Championship since its establishment by the Laois County Board in 1888.

Clonaslee were the defending champions.

The final was played at the County Grounds in Portlaoise on 29 October 1911, between Rathdowney and Clonaslee, in what was their third meeting in the final overall. Rathdowney won the match by 7–01 to 0–00 to claim their 10th championship title overall and a first title in three years.

== Results ==
=== Final ===
29 October 1911 Final	Rathdowney	7-11 - 0-00	Clonaslee	County Grounds
