= 1934 Laois Senior Hurling Championship =

Annual hurling competition season

- Champions: Abbeyleix (3rd title); Tommy Bergin (captain)
- Runners-up: Clonad

The 1934 Laois Senior Hurling Championship was the 41st staging of the Laois Senior Hurling Championship since its establishment by the Laois County Board in 1888.

Clonad were the defending champions.

The final was played on 11 November 1934 at O'Moore Park in Portlaoise, between Abbeyleix and Clonad, in what was their second meeting in the final overall. Abbeyleix won the match by 2–05 to 2–03 to claim their third championship title overall and a first title in two years.

== Results ==
=== Final ===
11 November 1934 Final	Abbeyleix	2-05 - 2-03	Clonad	O'Moore Park
