= 1903 Laois Senior Hurling Championship =

Annual hurling competition season

- Champions: Rathdowney (7th title); Peter Daly (captain)

The 1903 Laois Senior Hurling Championship was the 10th staging of the Laois Senior Hurling Championship since its establishment by the Laois County Board in 1888.

Rathdowney were the defending champions and retained the title to secure their seventh championship title overall.
