= 1996 Laois Senior Hurling Championship =

Annual hurling competition season

- Champions: Camross (22nd title); Matt Collier (captain)
- Runners-up: Castletown

The 1996 Laois Senior Hurling Championship was the 103rd staging of the Laois Senior Hurling Championship since its establishment by the Laois County Board in 1888.

Castletown were the defending champions.

The final was played on 22 September 1996 at O'Moore Park in Portlaoise, between Camross and Castletown, in what was their first ever meeting in the final. Camross won the match by 0–15 to 1–05 to claim their 22nd championship title overall and a first title in two years.

== Results ==
=== Semi-finals ===
8 September 1996 Semi-final	Camross	0-12 - 0-09	Portlaoise	O'Moore Park

8 September 1996 Semi-final	Castletown	1-12 - 0-09	Borris-in-Ossory	O'Moore Park

=== Final ===
22 September 1996 Final	Camross	0-15 - 1-05	Castletown	O'Moore Park
