= 1948 Laois Senior Hurling Championship =

Annual hurling competition season

- Champions: Clonad (7th title)
- Runners-up: Abbeyleix

The 1948 Laois Senior Hurling Championship was the 55th staging of the Laois Senior Hurling Championship since its establishment by the Laois County Board in 1888.

Clonad were the defending champions.

The final was played on 18 September 1949 at O'Moore Park in Portlaoise, between Clonad and Abbeyleix, in what was their sixth meeting in the final overall. Clonad won the match by 2–06 to 0–03 to claim their seventh championship title overall and a third consecutive title.

== Results ==
=== Final ===
18 September 1949 Final	Clonad	2-06 - 0-03	Abbeyleix	St Fintan's Park
