= Jack Daly (hurler) =

Irish hurler

Personal information
- Native name: Seán Ó Dálaigh (Irish)
- Born: 1889 Rathdowney, County Laois, Ireland
- Died: Unknown
- Occupation: Labourer

Sport
- Sport: Hurling
Club
- Years: Club
- Rathdowney
Inter-county
- Years: County
- Laois
Inter-county titles
- Leinster titles: 1
- All-Irelands: 1

John Daly (born 1889) was an Irish hurler who played for the Laois senior team.

Daly was a regular member of the starting fifteen during the successful 1915 championship campaign. That year he won one All-Ireland medal and one Leinster medal.

At club level Daly enjoyed a lengthy career, playing with Rathdowney.
