= Owen Holohan =

Irish hurler

Personal information
- Born: Ireland

Sport
- Sport: Hurling
- Position: Corner Forward
Club
- Years: Club
- Rathdowney–Errill
Inter-county
- Years: County
- Laois
Inter-county titles
- Leinster titles: 0
- All-Irelands: 0
- NHL: 0
- All Stars: 0

Owen Holohan is an Irish sportsperson. He plays hurling with his club Rathdowney–Errill and with the Laois senior inter-county hurling team. On 14 May 2011, he scored 1–1 against Antrim in the 2011 All-Ireland Senior Hurling Championship, starting at full forward in the 1–21 to 3–12 defeat.
