= 1979 Laois Senior Hurling Championship =

Annual hurling competition season

- Champions: Camross (14th title); Michael Carroll (captain)
- Runners-up: Ballinakill

The 1979 Laois Senior Hurling Championship was the 86th staging of the Laois Senior Hurling Championship since its establishment by the Laois County Board in 1888.

Camross were the defending champions.

The final was played on 7 October 1979 at O'Moore Park in Portlaoise, between Camross and Ballinakill, in what was their first ever meeting in the final. Camross won the match by 3–09 to 1–07 to claim their 14th championship title overall and a fourth consecutive title.

== Results ==
=== Final ===
7 October 1979 Final	Camross	3-09 - 1-07	Ballinakill	O'Moore Park
