= Frank Keenan (hurler) =

Irish hurler and manager

Personal information
- Native name: Prionsias Ó Cianáin (Irish)
- Born: 1950 (age 75–76) Camross, County Laois, Ireland

Sport
- Sport: Hurling
- Position: Full-forward
Club
- Years: Club
- 1968-1990: Camross
Club titles
- Laois titles: 14
- Leinster titles: 1
- All-Ireland Titles: 0
Inter-county
- Years: County
- 1970s: Laois
Inter-county titles
- Leinster titles: 0
- All-Irelands: 0
- NHL: 0
- All Stars: 0

Frank Keenan (born 1950 in Camross, County Laois, Ireland) is an Irish former hurling manager and former player.

An effective full-forward, Keenan had a successful playing career at club level with Camross and at inter-county level with Laois. He was a key member of the latter team throughout the 1970s and collected two All-Ireland 'B' medals in the space of three years. Keenan was also a Leinster medal-winner at club level with Camross.

In retirement from playing Keenan has become involved in team management at all levels. He had an unsuccessful tenure as manager of the Carlow senior hurling team in the late 1990s; however, it was as manager in all grades with his native club Camross that he experienced his greatest successes.
