= 1978 Laois Senior Hurling Championship =

Annual hurling competition season

- Champions: Camross (13th title); Seán Cuddy (captain)
- Runners-up: Borris-in-Ossory

The 1978 Laois Senior Hurling Championship was the 85th staging of the Laois Senior Hurling Championship since its establishment by the Laois County Board in 1888.

Camross were the defending champions.

The final was played on 10 September 1978 at O'Moore Park in Portlaoise, between Camross and Borris-in-Ossory, in what was their second meeting in the final overall. Camross won the match by 2–09 to 0–05 to claim their 13th championship title overall and a third consecutive title.

== Results ==
=== Final ===
10 September 1978 Final	Camross	2-09 - 0-05	Borris-in-Ossory	O'Moore Park
