= 1939 Laois Senior Hurling Championship =

Annual hurling competition season

- Champions: Abbeyleix (4th title); Michael Baggott (captain)
- Runners-up: Errill

The 1939 Laois Senior Hurling Championship was the 46th staging of the Laois Senior Hurling Championship since its establishment by the Laois County Board in 1888.

Errill were the defending champions.

The final was played on 10 September 1939 at O'Moore Park in Portlaoise, between Abbeyleix and Errill, in what was their first ever meeting in the final. Abbeyleix won the match by 2–09 to 1–03 to claim their fourth championship title overall and a first title in five years.

== Results ==
=== Final ===
10 September 1939 Final	Abbeyleix	2-09 - 1-03	Errill	O'Moore Park
