= 1962 Laois Senior Hurling Championship =

Annual hurling competition season

- Champions: Clonad (12th title)
- Runners-up: Borris-in-Ossory

The 1962 Laois Senior Hurling Championship was the 69th staging of the Laois Senior Hurling Championship since its establishment by the Laois County Board in 1888.

Borris-in-Ossory were the defending champions.

The final was played on 30 September 1962 at O'Moore Park in Portlaoise, between Clonad and Borris-in-Ossory, in what was their second consecutive meeting in the final. Clonad won the match by 1–08 to 0–05 to claim their 12th championship title overall and a first title in four years.

== Results ==
=== Final ===
| 30 September 1962 Final | Clonad | 1-08 - 0-05 | Borris-in-Ossory | O'Moore Park |
