= 1988 Laois Senior Hurling Championship =

Annual hurling competition season

- Champions: Camross (18th title); Alo Delaney (captain)
- Runners-up: Portlaoise

The 1988 Laois Senior Hurling Championship was the 95th staging of the Laois Senior Hurling Championship since its establishment by the Laois County Board in 1888.

Portlaoise were the defending champions.

The final was played on 11 September 1988 at O'Moore Park in Portlaoise, between Camross and Portlaoise, in what was their sixth meeting in the final overall. Camross won the match by 1–13 to 0–10 to claim a record-equalling 18th championship title overall and a first title in two years.

== Results ==
=== Final ===
| 11 September 1988 Final | Camross | 1-13 - 0-10 | Portlaoise | O'Moore Park |
