= 1933 Laois Senior Hurling Championship =

Annual hurling competition season

- Champions: Clonad (2nd title)
- Runners-up: Rathdowney

The 1933 Laois Senior Hurling Championship was the 40th staging of the Laois Senior Hurling Championship since its establishment by the Laois County Board in 1888.

Abbeyleix were the defending champions.

The final was played on 22 October 1933 at O'Moore Park in Portlaoise, between Clonad and Rathdwoeny, in what was their third meeting in the final overall. Clonad won the match by 5–03 to 0–02 to claim their second championship title overall and a first title in two years.

== Results ==
=== Final ===
22 October 1933 Final	Clonad	5-03 - 0-02	Rathdowney	O'Moore Park
