= 1926 Laois Senior Hurling Championship =

Annual hurling competition season

- Champions: Rathdowney (15th title); Jack Daly (captain)
- Runners-up: Ballacolla

The 1926 Laois Senior Hurling Championship was the 33rd staging of the Laois Senior Hurling Championship since its establishment by the Laois County Board in 1888.

Rathdowney were the defending champions.

The final was played on 31 October 1926 at the County Grounds in Portlaoise, between Rathdowney and Ballacolla, in what was their third meeting in the final overall. Rathdowney won the match by 6–01 to 2–00 to claim their 15th championship title overall and a second consecutive title.

== Results ==
=== Final ===
31 October 1926 Final	Rathdowney	6-01 - 2-00	Ballacolla	County Grounds
