= 1974 Laois Senior Hurling Championship =

Annual hurling competition season

- Champions: Camross (10th title); Christy Donovan (captain)
- Runners-up: Clonaslee

The 1974 Laois Senior Hurling Championship was the 81st staging of the Laois Senior Hurling Championship since its establishment by the Laois County Board in 1888.

Camross were the defending champions.

The final was played on 8 September 1974 at O'Moore Park in Portlaoise, between Camross and Clonaslee, in what was their first ever meeting in the final. Camross won the match by 1–15 to 0–05 to claim their 10th championship title overall and a second consecutive title.

== Results ==
=== Final ===
8 September 1974 Final	Camross	1-15 - 0-05	Clonaslee	O'Moore Park
