= 1976 Laois Senior Hurling Championship =

Annual hurling competition season

- Champions: Camross (11th title); Martin Cuddy (captain)
- Runners-up: Clonaslee

The 1976 Laois Senior Hurling Championship was the 83rd staging of the Laois Senior Hurling Championship since its establishment by the Laois County Board in 1888.

Clonaslee were the defending champions.

The final was played on 12 September 1976 at O'Moore Park in Portlaoise, between Camross and Clonaslee, in what was their second meeting in the final. Camross won the match by 1–13 to 1–09 to claim their 11th championship title overall and a first title in two years.

== Results ==
=== Final ===
| 12 September 1976 Final | Camross | 1-13 - 1-09 | Clonaslee | O'Moore Park |
