= 1940 Laois Senior Hurling Championship =

Annual hurling competition season

- Champions: Abbeyleix (5th title); Michael Baggott (captain)
- Runners-up: Kilcotton

The 1940 Laois Senior Hurling Championship was the 47th staging of the Laois Senior Hurling Championship since its establishment by the Laois County Board in 1888.

Abbeyleix were the defending champions.

The final was played on 15 September 1940 at O'Moore Park in Portlaoise, between Abbeyleix and Kilcotton, in what was their first ever meeting in the final. Abbeyleix won the match by 2–03 to 0–03 to claim their fifth championship title overall and a second consecutive title.

== Results ==
=== Final ===
15 September 1940 Final	Abbeyleix	2-03 - 0-03	Kilcotton	O'Moore Park
