= 1912 Laois Senior Hurling Championship =

Annual hurling competition season

- Champions: Rathdowney (11th title); Peter Daly (captain)
- Runners-up: Kilcotton; Jack Carroll (captain)

The 1912 Laois Senior Hurling Championship was the 19th staging of the Laois Senior Hurling Championship since its establishment by the Laois County Board in 1888.

Rathdowney were the defending champions.

The final was played at the County Grounds in Portlaoise on 20 October 1912, between Rathdowney and Kilcotton, in what was their third meeting in the final overall. Rathdowney won the match by 4–02 to 1–02 to claim their 11th championship title overall and a second consecutive title.

== Results ==
=== Final ===
20 October 1912 Final	Rathdowney	4-02 - 1-02	Kilcotton	County Grounds
