= 1984 Centenary Cup (hurling) =

- Dates: 15 April - 20 May 1984
- Teams: 18
- Sponsor: Ford
- Champions: Cork (1st title); John Fenton (captain)
- Runners-up: Laois; Pat Critchley (captain)

Tournament statistics
- Matches played: 17
- Goals scored: 73 (4.29 per match)
- Points scored: 388 (22.82 per match)
- Top scorer(s): P. J. Cuddy (5-05); Billy Bohane (0-20)

The 1984 Centenary Cup was a one-off staging of a special hurling competition organised as part of the Gaelic Athletic Association's centenary year celebrations. The draw for the opening rounds took place on RTÉ Television on 4 February 1984. The competition ran from 15 April to 20 May 1984.

The final was played on 20 May 1984 at Croke Park in Dublin, between Cork and Laois, in what was their first meeting in a national final since the 1915 All-Ireland final. Cork won the match by 2-21 to 1-09.

P. J. Cuddy and Billy Bohane were the top scorers.

== Results ==
=== Preliminary round ===
15 April 1984 Preliminary round	Down	1-10 - 1-14	Westmeath	St Patrick's Park
	A Sheehan 0-4, W McOvara 1-0, B Gilmore 0-3, C Magehan 0-2, H Gilmore 0-1.		E Gallagher 1-2, D Kilcoyne 0-5, S McKeogh 1-0, M Cosgrave 0-3, R Gavin 0-1, W Shanley 0-1, J Fitzsimons 0-1.

15 April 1984 Preliminary round	Roscommon	3-05 - 2-07	Wexford	Waldron Park
	J Kilroy 2-0, P Dolan 1-1, W Depinna 0-1, M Brennan 0-1, A Flaherty 0-1, F Carty 0-1.		A O'Connor 1-1, T Harrington 1-1, J Jordan 0-3, J O'Connor 0-1, M Quigley 0-1.

=== First round ===
28 April 1984 First round	Galway	2-17 - 0-08	Dublin	St Brendan's Park
	M Connolly 1-2, J Boland 0-5, S Linnane 0-4, PJ Molloy 1-0, N Lane 0-3, M McGrath 0-2, A Staunton 0-1.		L Walsh 0-2, J Twomey 0-1, P Mulhare 0-1, J Murphy 0-1, M Ryan 0-1, P Carton 0-1, G Hogarty 0-1.

29 April 1984 First round	Antrim	3-11 - 3-12	Waterford	Casement Park
	D Donnelly 2-0, S McKieran 1-0, P McIlhatton 0-4, D McKinley 0-3, D McNaughton 0-2, A McGarry 0-1, B Donnelly 0-1.		P Ryan 1-8, Mossie Walsh 1-0, T Maher 1-0, J Dalkin 0-2, J Hennebry 0-1, P Hennebry 0-1.

29 April 1984 First round	Kildare	4-07 - 5-20	Tipperary	St Conleth's Park
	J Walsh 0-6, M Egan 1-1, J O'Connell 1-0, G Deering 1-0, N O'Donoghue 1-0.		N English 1-6, N O'Dwyer 1-2, T Waters 1-1, S Power 1-1, P McGrath 1-1, A Buckley 0-3, R Callaghan 0-2, D O'Connell 0-2, L Maher 0-2.

29 April 1984 First round	Laois	2-09 - 2-08	Limerick	O'Keeffe Park
	PJ Cuddy 1-3, R Broderick 1-1, B Bohane 0-3, J Taylor 0-1, E Fennelly 0-1.		J McKenna 2-1, A Garvey 0-6, L O'Donoghue 0-1.

29 April 1984 First round	Roscommon	1-08 - 3-18	Cork	Waldron Park
	P Dolan 1-2, S Kilroy 0-3, J Kilroy 0-1, W Deppina 0-1, A Flaherty 0-1.		G Fitzgerald 1-4, S O'Leary 2-0, T Coyne 0-3, T Crowley 0-3, K Hennessy 0-2, T Mulcahy 0-2, P Horgan 0-1, J Buckley 0-1, T Finn 0-1, S O'Gorman 0-1.

29 April 1984 First round	Clare	4-10 - 0-09	Kerry	Gaelic Grounds
	C Lyons 2-2, J Callinan 1-3, D Chaplin 1-0, D Coote 0-3, G McInerney 0-1, T Nugent 0-1.		S O'Flaherty 0-5, C O'Connell 0-2, J O'Sullivan 0-1, B Neenan 0-1.

29 April 1984 First round	Wicklow	2-08 - 3-17	Kilkenny	Aughrim County Ground
	P Berkery 0-6, D Heffernan 1-0, G Murphy 1-0, P Doyle 0-2.		K Fennelly 2-2, G Ryan 1-1, K Brennan 0-4, B Fitzpatrick 0-4, MJ Ryan 0-2, G Fennelly 0-2, D Carroll 0-1, N Brennan 0-1.

29 April 1984 First round	Westmeath	0-14 - 1-15	Offaly	Cusack Park
	D Kilcoyne 0-11, W Shanley 0-2, M Cosgrave 0-1.		J Dooley 1-3, P Horan 0-3, M Corrigan 0-3, P Kirwan 0-1, L Currams 0-1, A Fogarty 0-1, P Corrigan 0-1, J Kelly 0-1, T Connelly 0-1.

=== Quarter-finals ===
6 May 1984 Quarter-final	Galway	3-14 - 2-08	Waterford	Semple Stadium
	M McGrath 0-5, F Gantley 0-5, N Lane 1-1, PJ Molloy 1-0, Joe Connolly 1-0, S Boland 0-2, A Staunton 0-1.		P Ryan 0-6, E Rockett 1-1, Mossie Walsh 1-0, J Dalton 0-1.

6 May 1984 Quarter-final	Cork	0-14 - 1-05	Clare	Semple Stadium
	S O'Leary 0-4, J Fenton 0-3, J Barry-Murphy 0-3, K Hennessy 0-2, J Buckley 0-1, P Horgan 0-1.		D Chaplin 1-1, D Coote 0-1, J Callinan 0-1, C Lyons 0-1, K McNamara 0-1.

6 May 1984 Quarter-final	Laois	1-17 - 4-07	Tipperary	Nowlan Park
	B Bohane 0-10, M Walsh 1-1, E Fennelly 0-2, PJ Cuddy 0-2, M Cuddy 0-1, C Jones 0-1.		N English 2-1, S Power 1-2, N O'Dwyer 1-0, D O'Connell 0-3, P McGrath 0-1.

6 May 1984 Quarter-final	Offaly	1-17 - 2-11	Kilkenny	Croke Park
	P Corrigan 0-5, D Fogarty 1-1, P Horan 0-4, J Dooley 0-3, T Connolly 0-2, B Keeshan 0-1, P Delaney 0-1.		C Heffernan 1-4, K Brennan 1-0, H Ryan 0-3, B Fitzpatrick 0-2, G Fennelly 0-1, R Power 0-1.

=== Semi-finals ===
13 May 1984 Semi-final	Loais	5-07 - 4-09	Galway	Semple Stadium
	PJ Cuddy 3-0, C Jones 1-0, M Walsh 1-0, B Bohane 0-3, M Brophy 0-2, P Critchley 0-1, E Fennelly 0-1.		N Lane 2-3, F Gantley 1-2, A Staunton 1-0, J Boland 0-2, S Linnane 0-1, M McGrath 0-1.

13 May 1984 Semi-final	Cork	1-15 - 3-07	Offaly	Semple Stadium
	J Barry-Murphy 1-3, S O'Leary 0-4, J Fenton 0-4, D Walsh 0-2, T Mulcahy 0-1, K Hennessy 0-1.		J Dooley 2-0, P Horan 1-1, M Corrigan 0-2, P Corrigan 0-2, P Delaney 0-1.

=== Final ===
20 May 1984 Final	Cork	2-21 - 1-09	Laois	Croke Park
	T Mulcahy 1-2, J Fenton 0-5, K Hennessy 1-1, J Barry-Murphy 0-4, S O'Leary 0-3, D Walsh 0-3, J Hartnett 0-1, P Horgan 0-1, D MacCurtain 0-1.		B Bohane 0-4, PJ Cuddy 1-0, P Critchley 0-1, M Cuddy 0-1, M Brophy 0-1, E Fennelly 0-1, C Jones 0-1.	Referee: N O'Donoghue (Dublin)

== Statistics ==
=== Top scorers ===
Rank	Player	Club	Tally	Total	Matches	Average
1	P. J. Cuddy	Laois	5-05	20	4	5.00
1	Billy Bohane	Laois	0-20	20	4	5.00
3	Pat Ryan	Waterford	1-14	17	2	8.50
4	Nicky English	Tipperary	3-07	16	2	8.00
4	Noel Lane	Galway	3-07	16	3	5.33
4	David Kilcoyne	Westmeath	0-16	16	2	8.00
7	Joe Dooley	Offaly	3-06	15	3	5.00
8	Seánie O'Leary	Cork	2-07	13	4	3.25
8	Jimmy Barry-Murphy	Cork	1-10	13	3	4.33
10	John Fenton	Cork	0-12	12	3	4.00
