= 1977 Laois Senior Hurling Championship =

Annual hurling competition season

- Champions: Camross (12th title); Paddy Dowling (captain)
- Runners-up: Portlaoise

The 1977 Laois Senior Hurling Championship was the 84th staging of the Laois Senior Hurling Championship since its establishment by the Laois County Board in 1888.

Camross were the defending champions.

The final was played on 11 September 1977 at O'Moore Park in Portlaoise, between Camross and Portlaoise, in what was their first ever meeting in the final. Camross won the match by 2–14 to 0–05 to claim their 12th championship title overall and a second consecutive title.

== Results ==
=== Final ===
11 September 1977 Final	Camross	2-14 - 0-05	Portlaoise	O'Moore Park
