= Jack Kelly (hurler) =

Irish hurler

Personal information
- Native name: Seán Ó Ceallaigh (Irish)
- Born: 1996 (age 29–30) Rathdowney, County Laois, Ireland

Sport
- Sport: Hurling
- Position: Right wing-back
Club
- Years: Club
- Rathdowney–Errill
Club titles
- Laois titles: 0
Inter-county
- Years: County
- 2018-present: Laois
Inter-county titles
- Leinster titles: 0
- All-Irelands: 0
- NHL: 0
- All Stars: 0

Jack Kelly (born 1996) is a hurler who plays for Laois Senior Championship club Rathdowney–Errill and at inter-county level with the Laois senior hurling team. He usually lines out as a right wing-back.

== Honours ==
Laois

- Joe McDonagh Cup (1): 2019
