= 1968 Laois Senior Hurling Championship =

Annual hurling competition season

- Champions: Camross (6th title); Ger Cuddy (captain)
- Runners-up: Cullohill

The 1968 Laois Senior Hurling Championship was the 75th staging of the Laois Senior Hurling Championship since its establishment by the Laois County Board in 1888.

Camross were the defending champions.

The final was played on 6 October 1968 at O'Moore Park in Portlaoise, between Camross and Cullohill, in what was their second meeting in the final. Camross won the match by 5–13 to 2–05 to claim their sixth championship title overall and a fourth consecutive title.

== Results ==
=== Final ===
6 October 1968 Final	Camross	5-13 - 2-05	Cullohill	O'Moore Park
