= 1944 Laois Senior Hurling Championship =

Annual hurling competition season

- Champions: Abbeyleix (6th title); Dan Cranny (captain)
- Runners-up: Kilcotton

The 1944 Laois Senior Hurling Championship was the 51st staging of the Laois Senior Hurling Championship since its establishment by the Laois County Board in 1888.

Portlaoise were the defending champions.

The final was played on 24 September 1944 at O'Moore Park in Portlaoise, between Abbeyleix and Kilcotton, in what was their second meeting in the final overall. Abbeyleix won the match by 2–03 to 0–03 to claim their sixth championship title overall and a first title in four years.

== Results ==
=== Final ===
24 September 1944 Final	Abbeyleix	2-09 - 0-03	Kilcotton	O'Moore Park
