= John Killeen =

Irish hurler

Personal information
- Native name: Seán Ó Cillín (Irish)
- Born: 1920 Tynagh, County Galway, Ireland
- Died: July 2005 (aged 84–85) Portlaoise, County Laois, Ireland

Sport
- Sport: Hurling
- Position: Left wing-forward
Clubs
- Years: Club
- Tynagh; Clonad
Club titles
- Laois titles: 2
Inter-county
- Years: County
- 1944–1954: Galway
Inter-county titles
- All-Irelands: 0
- NHL: 1

John Killeen (1920 – June 2005) was an Irish hurler who played as a left wing-forward for the Galway senior team.

== Playing career ==
Killeen made his first appearance for the team during the 1944 championship and was a regular member of the starting fifteen until his retirement a decade later after the 1954 championship. During that time he won a National Hurling League winners' medal.

At club level Duffy began his club career with Tynagh in Galway before later winning two county club championship medals with Clonad in Laois.
