= 1980 Laois Senior Hurling Championship =

Annual hurling competition season

- Champions: Camross (15th title); Richard Moloney (captain)
- Runners-up: Portlaoise

The 1980 Laois Senior Hurling Championship was the 87th staging of the Laois Senior Hurling Championship since its establishment by the Laois County Board in 1888.

Camross were the defending champions.

The final was played on 5 October 1980 at O'Moore Park in Portlaoise, between Camross and Portlaoise, in what was their second meeting in the final overall. Camross won the match by 3–04 to 1–08 to claim their 15th championship title overall and a fifth consecutive title.

== Results ==
=== Final ===
5 October 1980 Final	Camross	3-04 - 1-08	Portlaoise	O'Moore Park
