= 1969 Laois Senior Hurling Championship =

Annual hurling competition season

- Champions: Camross (7th title); Ger Cuddy (captain)
- Runners-up: Rathdowney

The 1969 Laois Senior Hurling Championship was the 76th staging of the Laois Senior Hurling Championship since its establishment by the Laois County Board in 1888.

Camross were the defending champions.

The final was played on 14 September 1969 at O'Moore Park in Portlaoise, between Camross and Rathdowney, in what was their second meeting in the final. Camross won the match by 3–13 to 2–05 to claim their seventh championship title overall and a fifth consecutive title.

== Results ==
=== Final ===
14 September 1969 Final	Camross	3-13 - 2-05	Rathdowney	O'Moore Park
