= 1889 Laois Senior Hurling Championship =

Annual hurling competition season

- Champions: Rathdowney (2nd title); John Fitzgerald (captain)
- Runners-up: Skierke

The 1889 Laois Senior Hurling Championship was the second staging of the Laois Senior Hurling Championship since its establishment by the Laois County Board in 1888.

Rathdowney were the defending champions.

The final was played on 13 May 1888 at the Clough Grounds, between Rathdowney and Skierke, in what was their first ever meeting in the final. Rathdowney won the match by 3–05 to 0–00 to claim their second consecutive championship title.

== Results ==
=== Final ===
26 May 1888 Final	Rathdowney	3-05 - 0-00	Skierke	Clough Grounds
