= 1986 Laois Senior Hurling Championship =

Annual hurling competition season

- Champions: Camross (17th title); Joe Doran (captain)
- Runners-up: Errill

The 1986 Laois Senior Hurling Championship was the 93rd staging of the Laois Senior Hurling Championship since its establishment by the Laois County Board in 1888.

Camross were the defending champions.

The final was played on 14 September 1986 at O'Moore Park in Portlaoise, between Camross and Errill, in what was their first ever meeting in the final. Camross won the match by 4–09 to 2–14 to claim their 17th championship title overall and a second consecutive title.

== Results ==
=== Final ===
14 September 1986 Final	Camross	4-09 - 2-14	Errill	O'Moore Park
