= Ross King (hurler) =

Irish hurler

Personal information
- Native name: Rosach Ó Cionga (Irish)
- Nickname: Roddy
- Born: 16 August 1993 (age 33) Rathdowney, County Laois, Ireland
- Occupation: Sales adviser
- Height: 5 ft 11 in (180 cm)

Sport
- Sport: Hurling
- Position: Left corner-forward
Club
- Years: Club
- Rathdowney–Errill
Club titles
- Laois titles: 2
College
- Years: College
- University College Dublin
College titles
- Fitzgibbon titles: 0
Inter-county*
Years	County	Apps (scores)
2014-present	Laois	22 (2-73)
Inter-county titles
- Leinster titles: 0
- All-Irelands: 0
- NHL: 0
- All Stars: 0
- *Inter County team apps and scores correct as of 11 July 2021, 16:57.

Ross King (born 16 August 1993) is an Irish hurler who plays for Laois Senior Championship club Rathdowney–Errill and at inter-county level with the Laois senior hurling team. He usually lines out as a left corner-forward.

== Career ==
King first came to prominence as a member of the Rathdowney–Errill club at juvenile and underage levels. He eventually joined the club's senior team and has since won County Championship titles in 2012, 2014 and 2019. He simultaneously played with University College Dublin in the Fitzgibbon Cup, having earlier won a Collingwood Cup medal as a soccer player. King made his first appearances at inter-county level during a three-year stint with the Laois under-21 team. He joined the Laois senior hurling team in 2014 and was at corner-forward when Laois secured the 2019 Joe McDonagh Cup title.

== Career statistics ==
As of match played 10 July 2021.

Team	Year	National League			McDonagh Cup		Leinster		All-Ireland		Total	
Team	Year	Division	Apps	Score	Apps	Score	Apps	Score	Apps	Score	Apps	Score
Laois	2014	Division 1B	6	1-09	—		5	0-06	1	0-02	12	1-17
Laois	2015	Division 1B	5	1-05	—		3	0-06	0	0-00	8	1-11
Laois	2016	Division 1B	5	0-03	—		1	0-00	1	0-00	7	0-03
Laois	2017	Division 1B	6	0-39	—		4	0-41	1	0-01	11	0-81
Laois	2018	Division 1B	6	0-58	4	0-35	—		—		10	0-93
Laois	2019	Division 1B	—		5	2-09	—		2	1-01	7	3-10
Laois	2020	Division 1B	5	0-41	—		1	0-10	1	1-02	7	1-53
Laois	2021	Division 1B	5	1-16	—		1	0-02	1	0-02	7	1-20
Career total			38	3-171	9	2-44	15	0-65	7	2-08	69	7-288

== Honours ==
University College Dublin

- Collingwood Cup: 2012

Rathdowney-Errill

- Laois Senior Hurling Championship: 2012, 2014, 2019

Laois

- Joe McDonagh Cup: 2019

Sporting positions
Preceded by Charles Dwyer	Laois Senior Hurling Captain; 2017-2018	Succeeded by Paddy Purcell
