= David Dooley (Laois hurler) =

Irish hurler

Personal information
- Native name: Daithí Ó Dulaoích (Irish)
- Born: 2003 (age 22–23) Rosenallis, County Laois, Ireland

Sport
- Sport: Hurling
- Position: Midfield
Club
- Years: Club
- Rosenallis
Club titles
- Laois titles: 0
College
- Years: College
- 2020-2024: Maynooth University
College titles
- Fitzgibbon titles: 0
Inter-county
- Years: County
- 2024–present: Laois
Inter-county titles
- Leinster titles: 0
- All-Irelands: 0
- NHL: 0
- All Stars: 0

David Dooley (born 2003) is an Irish hurler. At club level he plays with Rosenallis and at inter-county level with the Laois senior hurling team.

== Career ==
Dooley attended Mountmellick Community School. He later studied at Maynooth University and lined out in the Fitzgibbon Cup. At club level, Dooley first played for Rosenallis at juvenile and underage levels, before progressing to adult level.

At inter-county level, Dooley first played for Laois during a two-year tenure with the minor team in 2019 and 2020. He was first named on the Laois senior hurling team in May 2021, however, it was later discovered that he was ineligible. Having also played club rugby with Tullamore and MU Barnhall, Dooley later left the hurling scene and joined the Leinster Rugby Academy and earned a call-up to the Ireland under-20 team.

Dooley returned to the Laois senior hurling team and made his debut in a National Hurling League game against Down in February 2024. He claimed his first silverware that year when Laois beat Carlow to win the National Hurling League Division 2A title. Dooley added a Division 2 medal to his collection in 2026. He was part of the Laois team that lost consecutive Joe McDonagh Cup finals to Offaly in 2024 and Kildare in 2025, when he was also team captain. Dooley captained the team lined from midfield when Laois beat Carlow by 1–27 to 1–18 to win the Joe McDonagh Cup title in June 2026.

At international level, Dooley earned a call-up to the national team for the Shinty–Hurling International Series in October 2025.

== Honours ==
Laois

- Joe McDonagh Cup (1): 2026 (c)
- National Hurling League Division 2 (1): 2026 (c)
- National Hurling League Division 2A (1): 2024

Ireland

- Shinty–Hurling International Series (1): 2025

Sporting positions
Preceded by Aaron Dunphy	Laois senior hurling team captain 2025-present	Succeeded by Incumbent
Achievements
Preceded by Rian Boran	Joe McDonagh Cup final winning captain 2024	Succeeded by Incumbent
