= 1945 Laois Senior Hurling Championship =

Annual hurling competition season

- Champions: Abbeyleix (7th title); Dan Cranny (captain)
- Runners-up: Camross

The 1945 Laois Senior Hurling Championship was the 52nd staging of the Laois Senior Hurling Championship since its establishment by the Laois County Board in 1888.

Abbeyleix were the defending champions.

The final was played on 14 October 1945 at O'Moore Park in Portlaoise, between Abbeyleix and Camross, in what was their first ever meeting in the final. Abbeyleix won the match by 5–05 to 1–02 to claim their seventh championship title overall and a second consecutive title.

== Results ==
=== Final ===
14 October 1945 Final	Abbeyleix	5-05 - 1-02	Camross	O'Moore Park
