= 1958 Laois Senior Hurling Championship =

Annual hurling competition season

- Champions: Clonad (11th title)
- Runners-up: Borris-in-Ossory

The 1958 Laois Senior Hurling Championship was the 65th staging of the Laois Senior Hurling Championship since its establishment by the Laois County Board in 1888.

Borris-in-Ossory were the defending champions.

The final, a replay, was played on 9 November 1958 at O'Moore Park in Portlaoise, between Clonad and Borris-in-Ossory, in what was their first ever meeting in the final. Clonad won the match by 3–04 to 1–09 to claim their 11th championship title overall and a first title in four years.

== Results ==
=== Final ===
19 October 1958 Final	Clonad	1-09 - 2-06	Borris-in-Ossory	O'Moore Park

=== Final replay ===
9 November 1958 Final replay	Clonad	3-04 - 1-09	Borris-in-Ossory	O'Moore Park
