= John A. Delaney (hurler) =

Irish hurler

Personal information
- Native name: Seán A. Ó Dúláinne (Irish)
- Nickname: A
- Born: 4 June 1986 (age 40) Portlaoise, Ireland
- Height: 1.8 m (5 ft 11 in)

Sport
- Sport: Hurling
- Position: Right Corner Back
Club
- Years: Club
- 2004-: Clough–Ballacolla
Club titles
- Laois titles: 1
Inter-county*
Years	County	Apps (scores)
2006-	Laois	13 (0-0)
- *Inter County team apps and scores correct as of 7 June 2011.

John A. Delaney (born 4 June 1986) is an Irish sportsperson. He plays hurling with his local club Clough–Ballacolla, and has been a member of the Laois senior inter-county team since 2006.
