= 1984 Laois Senior Hurling Championship =

Annual hurling competition season

- Champions: Portlaoise (6th title); John Joe Ging (captain)
- Runners-up: The Harps; Martin Brophy (captain)

The 1984 Laois Senior Hurling Championship was the 91st staging of the Laois Senior Hurling Championship since its establishment by the Laois County Board in 1888.

Portlaoise were the defending champions.

The final, a replay, was played on 30 September 1984 at O'Moore Park in Portlaoise, between Portlaoise and The Harps, in what was their first ever meeting in the final. Portlaoise won the match by 2–14 to 1–07 to claim their sixth championship title overall and a fourth consecutive title.

== Results ==
=== Final ===
10 September 1984 Final	Portlaoise	1-08 - 2-05	The Harps	O'Moore Park

=== Final replay ===
30 September 1984 Final	Portlaoise	2-14 - 1-07	The Harps	O'Moore Park
