= 1954 Laois Senior Hurling Championship =

Annual hurling competition season

- Champions: Clonad (10th title)
- Runners-up: Errill

The 1954 Laois Senior Hurling Championship was the 61st staging of the Laois Senior Hurling Championship since its establishment by the Laois County Board in 1888.

Clonad were the defending champions.

The final was played on 12 September 1954 at O'Moore Park in Portlaoise, between Clonad and Errill, in what was their third meeting in the final overall. Clonad won the match by 1–09 to 0–04 to claim their 10th championship title overall and a second consecutive title.

== Results ==
=== Final ===
12 September 1954 Final	Clonad	1-09 - 0-04	Errill	O'Moore Park
