= Brian Campion (hurler) =

Irish hurler

Personal information
- Native name: Briain Caimpion (Irish)
- Born: 1985 (age 40–41) Rathdowney, County Laois, Ireland
- Occupation: CEO Designate

Sport
- Sport: Hurling
- Position: Left corner-back
Club
- Years: Club
- Rathdowney–Errill
Club titles
- Laois titles: 5
Inter-county
Years	County	Apps (scores)
2004-2015	Laois	28 (0-8)
Inter-county titles
- Leinster titles: 0
- All-Irelands: 0
- NHL: 0
- All Stars: 0

Brian Campion (born 1984) is an Irish hurler who played as a goalkeeper, corner-back, full-back, wing-back and centre-back for the Laois senior team.

Born in Rathdowney, County Laois, Campion first played competitive hurling during his schooling at St. Fergal's College. He arrived on the inter-county scene as a member of the minor team before later joining the under-21 side. He made his senior debut during the 2005 championship. Campion immediately became a regular member of the starting fifteen and won one National League (Division 2) medal.

At international level Campion played for the composite rules shinty-hurling team at under-21 level in 2005. He was a member of the Leinster inter-provincial team on a number of occasions, however, he never won a Railway Cup medal. At club level Campion is a three-time championship medallist with Rathdowney–Errill.

Throughout his career Campion made 28 championship appearances. He announced his retirement from inter-county hurling on 12 January 2015.

== Honours ==
=== Team ===
Rathdowney-Errill

- Laois Senior Hurling Championship (5): 2006, 2008, 2010, 2012, 2014

Laois

- National Hurling League (Division 2) (1): 2007

Sporting positions
Preceded by Niall Holmes	Laois Senior Hurling Captain; 2009-2011	Succeeded by Willie Hyland
