= 1961 Laois Senior Hurling Championship =

Annual hurling competition season

- Champions: Borris-in-Ossory (4th title); Christy O'Brien (captain)
- Runners-up: Cuddagh

The 1961 Laois Senior Hurling Championship was the 68th staging of the Laois Senior Hurling Championship since its establishment by the Laois County Board in 1888.

Borris-in-Ossory were the defending champions.

The final was played on 17 September 1961 at O'Moore Park in Portlaoise, between Borris-in-Ossory and Cuddagh. Borris-in-Ossory won the match by 3–11 to 0–04 to claim their fourth championship title overall and a second consecutive title.

== Results ==
=== Final ===
17 September 1961 Final	Borris-in-Ossory	3-11 - 0-04	Cuddagh	O'Moore Park
