= Rathdowney–Errill GAA =

Hurling club in County Laois, Ireland

Rathdowney–Errill
- Rath Domhnaigh–Eireil
- Founded: 2005
- County: Laois
- Colours: Red, White and Green
- Grounds: Kelly O'Daly Park and Páirc Eireil
- Coordinates: 52°51′10.89″N 7°35′11.99″W

Playing kits
Standard colours

Senior Club Championships
	All Ireland	Leinster champions	Laois champions
Hurling:	-	-	6

Rathdowney–Errill GAA is a Gaelic Athletic Association hurling club in County Laois, Ireland. The club colours are green and red.

The club was created in 2005 by the complete amalgamation at all levels of hurling of neighbouring clubs Errill and Rathdowney. Both the Rathdowney and Errill Clubs remain as separate football clubs competing in the Laois Junior B Football Championship.

== History ==
Prior to the foundation of the Errill GAA Club in 1928, players from Errill and surrounding areas played their hurling with Rathdowney. In the 1970s and 1980s, both Rathdowney and Errill joined forces at Minor and Under 21 level, competing in eight minor finals, including seven in a row from 1976 to 1982. This amalgamation proved successful winning a total of five Laois Minor Hurling Championship titles, including a four in a row 1976–1979. At Under 21 level success was achieved as 'St Kierans' in 1980 and under the Rathdowney/Errill banner in 1985.

Tentative suggestions were made in 1999 about a possible merger of the clubs. At the time these discussions did not reach any agreement, but in 2002 the juvenile sections of both clubs decided to come together and since then they have been successful.

With the smooth running of juvenile affairs taking place in the parish, the suggestion of joining to become a strong Senior Club was once again raised in January 2005. Both adult clubs held simultaneous meetings on Friday evening 4 February 2005 to discuss a possible merger. Over three quarters of the members in both clubs voted to amalgamate.

Rathdowney had not won a Laois SHC since 1941. The last time they appeared in a final was 1969 when they lost to Camross. Rathdowney had won 18 Senior Titles. Errill last competed in the SHC in 1986, and won just two Titles, the first against Rathdowney in 1936 and the last in 1952.

== Achievements ==
In 2006 the Rathdowney–Errill team won the Laois Senior Hurling Championship for the first time, defeating Tinnahinch. Liam Wynne captained the club and became the first man from the parish to captain a county senior hurling championship winning team since 1952. They repeated the feat in 2008 after a final against Portlaoise which Rathdowney-Errill won on a score of 1–19 to 2–15, and were captained by John Purcell.

In 2010 Liam Tynan captained Rathdowney–Errill to their third Laois Senior Hurling Championship, becoming the third Errill man to do so. They defeated Camross.

Shane Dollard became the first Rathdowney man to bring the Bob O'Keefe trophy across the Gully when he captained Rathdowney–Errill to a Senior County title victory over Clough–Ballacolla, in 2012.

In the Leinster Club Championship of 2012, Rathdowney–Errill defeated Clonkill (Wesmeath) in O'Moore Park Portlaoise. This was their first victory in the Leinster Club Championship after defeats to Rathnure (2006), Ballyhale Shamrocks (2008) and O'Loughlin Gaels (2010). They were edged out by Kilcormac-Killoughey (Offaly) in the Leinster Club Championship Semi-Final.

In 2014, the club recorded their fifth Senior County title, defeating Camross in the final on a score of 1–20 to 0–10. Alan Delaney captained the side. This title added to their All County League Division 1 title, also in 2014, to complete a double. In the Leinster Club Championship of 2014 they were narrowly defeated by Kilmacud Crokes GAA (Dublin) in extra time at the quarter-final stage.

== County Final winning results ==
Year	Winner	Opponent
2019	Rathdowney–Errill 0–17	Borris-in-Ossory – Kilcotton 1–9
2014	Rathdowney–Errill 1–20	Camross 0–10
2012 (Replay)	Rathdowney–Errill 0–17	Clough-Ballacolla 0–14
2012	Rathdowney–Errill 1–11	Clough-Ballacolla 2-08
2010	Rathdowney–Errill 2–11	Camross 1-09
2008	Rathdowney–Errill 1–19	Portlaoise 2–15
2006	Rathdowney–Errill 1–11	Tinnahinch 1-07

== Leinster Club Championship results ==
Year	Stage	Winner	Opponent							
2019	Leinster Semi-final	St Mullin's 2–17	Rathdowney–Errill 1–19							
2019	Leinster Quarter-final	Rathdowney–Errill 4–16	St Rynagh's 0–10							
2014	Leinster Quarter-final	Kilmacud Crokes 0–23	Rathdowney–Errill 0–22	Leinster Semi-final	Rathdowney–Errill or	Rathdowney–Errill or	2012	Leinster Semi-final	Kilcormac-Killoughey 2–12	Rathdowney–Errill 0–14
2012	Leinster Quarter-final	Rathdowney–Errill 1–12	Clonkill 0–12							
2010	Leinster Quarter-final	O'Loughlin Gaels 3–16	Rathdowney–Errill 0–14							
2008	Leinster Quarter-final	Ballyhale Shamrocks 1–18	Rathdowney–Errill 1–11							
2006	Leinster Quarter-final	Rathnure 2–13	Rathdowney–Errill 0–14							

== Laois Senior Hurling Championship Titles ==
Club	Wins	Years won
Rathdowney–Errill	6	2006, 2008, 2010, 2012, 2014, 2019
Rathdowney	18	1888, 1889, 1898, 1899, 1902, 1903, 1907, 1908, 1911, 1912, 1921, 1922, 1925, 1926, 1931, 1936, 1941
Errill	2	1938, 1952

== Facilities ==
Rathdowney's Kelly O'Daly Park has hosted many County Finals, Leinster Club Championship and Inter-County matches. Erril's GAA Grounds, Páirc Eireil, opened in the mid-1990s with a game between Laois v Clare.

== Notable club members ==
- Jack Daly, Jimmy Hiney, Frank Kileen, Paddy Campion and Jim Deegan won an All-Ireland medal with Laois in 1915.
- Harry Grey won a SHC title with Rathdowney in 1936 before moving to Dublin and winning an All-Ireland with them in 1938. He was selected on the Laois Team of the Millennium along with Mick Mahon.
- Other players who have represented the county (or province) include:
  - Bill Maher
  - Mick Mahon
  - Paddy Mahon
  - Johnny Mahon
  - Pat Dowling
  - Neil Browne
  - Peader Cleary
  - John Delaney
  - Ross King
  - Liam Tynan-Laois Senior Hurler of the year 2010.
  - Enda Meagher
  - Pat Mahon – Laois GAA Senior Hurler of the year 2006
- Pat Delaney refereed the 1989 All Ireland Senior Hurling Final between Tipperary and Antrim.
- Brian Campion, Joe Fitzpatrick, Shane Dollard, Owen Holohan, Mark Kavanagh, Jack Kelly and John Purcell have all represented Laois Seniors in the recent past.
- Brian Campion was named Laois Senior Hurler of the Year in 2008 and 2012.
- Joe Fitzpatrick was named Laois Senior Hurler of the Year in 2006 and captained Laois to the Allianz National Hurling League, Division 2 in 2007.
- Darren King – Captained Laois U/21's to a Leinster Final appearance in 2012.
- Patrick Purcell – Captained Laois to the 2019 Joe McDonagh Cup.

== Roll of honour ==
=== Adult ===
- Laois Senior Hurling Championships: (5) 2006, 2008, 2010, 2012, 2019 and 2014
- Laois All-County Hurling League Division 1: (1) 2014
- Leinster Senior Hurling Leagues: (1) 2005
- Laois Intermediate Hurling Championships: (1) 2005
- Laois Junior C Hurling Championships: 2010, 2013
- Laois All-County Hurling League Division 5: (1) 2006
- Laois Under-21 Hurling Championships: (2) 2011 2017
- Laois Minor Hurling Championships: (1) 2008
