= Camross GAA =

GAA club in County Laois

Camross
- Camros
- Founded: 1903
- County: Laois
- Colours
- Grounds: Camross GAA Grounds
- Coordinates: 52°59′50″N 7°33′42″W

Playing kits
Standard colours

Senior Club Championships
	All Ireland	Leinster champions	Laois champions
Hurling:	0	2	27

Camross GAA is a Gaelic Athletic Association club in Camross, County Laois, Ireland. The club is affiliated to the Laois County Board and fields teams in hurling, camogie and Gaelic football.

== History ==
Located near the villages of Camross and Coolrain, about 8 km from Mountrath, Camross GAA Club was founded in 1903. The club spent the majority of its early existence competing in the junior grade and won Laois JHC titles in 1914, 1921 and 1928. A Laois IHC was claimed in 1939. Camross amalgamated with parish counterparts Killanure in 1957. Following the amalgamation, Camross won a fourth Laois JHC title in 1957, followed by a second Laois IHC title in 1958.

Camross beat Cuddagh by 2–05 to 3–01 to claim their first ever Laois SHC title in 1959. This title win began an unprecedented era of success, with Camross dominating the championship for the rest of the century. 15 Laois SHC titles were won between 1959 and 1980, including a record-equalling five successive titles on two occasions (1965–1969 and 1976–1980). Camross became the first Laois team to win the Leinster Club SHC title when, in February 1977, they beat James Stephens by 3–09 to 1–14 to secure the title. Camross were subsequently beaten by Glen Rovers in the 1977 All-Ireland Club SHC final. Although primarily a hurling club, Camross also won the Laois JFC title in 1980.

Camross won a further seven Laois SHC titles between 1985 and 1996. Their 1990 win over Portlaoise gave the club a record-breaking 19th Laois SHC title to put them top of the all-time roll of honour. Camross won their second Leinster Club SHC title after a 1–12 to 2–05 win over O'Tooles in 1996. The new century saw Camross continue to win Laois SHC titles, however, their dominance of the championship was not as evident. The club beat Abbeyleix by 4–18 to 0–14 to claim their 27th Laois SHC title in 2023.

== Honours ==
=== Hurling ===
- Leinster Senior Club Hurling Championship (2): 1976, 1996
- Laois Senior Hurling Championship (27): 1959, 1963, 1965, 1966, 1967, 1968, 1969, 1971, 1973, 1974, 1976, 1977, 1978, 1979, 1980, 1985, 1986, 1988, 1990, 1993, 1994, 1996, 2007, 2013, 2017, 2018, 2023
- Laois Intermediate Hurling Championship (5): 1939, 1958, 1983, 2000, 2010, 2019
- Laois Junior A Hurling Championship (11): 1914, 1921, 1928, 1957, 1964, 1972, 1981, 1988, 2003, 2008, 2014
- Laois Junior B Hurling Championship (6): 1988, 1989, 1994, 2001, 2011, 2020
- Laois Junior C Hurling Championship (2): 2006, 2016
- Laois Under 21 A Hurling Championship (8): 1965, 1966, 1967, 1969, 1977, 1999, 2018, 2019
- Laois Minor Hurling Championship (3): 2005 (with Kyle), 2017, 2021

=== Gaelic football ===
- Laois Junior A Football Championship (1): 1980
- Laois Junior B Football Championship (3): 2005, 2016, 2022
- Laois Junior C Football Championship (1): 2014

=== Camogie ===
- All-Ireland Intermediate Club Camogie Championship (1): 2025
- Leinster Intermediate Club Camogie Championship (1): 2025
- Laois Intermediate Club Camogie Championship: 2025, 2026
