= Clonad GAA =

GAA club in County Laois, Ireland

Clonad
- Cluain Fhada
- Founded: 1915
- County: Laois
- Colours
- Grounds: Clonad GAA Grounds
- Coordinates: 52°59′38.85″N 7°17′46.33″W

Playing kits
Standard colours

Senior Club Championships
	All Ireland	Leinster champions	Laois champions
Hurling:	0	0	14

Clonad GAA is a Gaelic Athletic Association club in Ballycarnan, County Laois, Ireland. The club is solely concerned with the game of hurling, with those interested in Gaelic football playing with neighbouring clubs The Heath and Ballyroan.

== History ==
Located just outside the town of Portlaoise, records suggest that Gaelic games had been played in the area in the 18th century, when a person associated with the Barrington Estate was a patron of a hurling team. A club also existed in the area in the early years of the Gaelic Athletic Association.

Clonad GAA Club was founded in 1915 to promote hurling in the rural area to the south of Portlaoise. After joining the senior ranks in 1927, the club claimed its first Laois SHC title in 1930. Clonad quickly became one of the dominant teams in the competition and won ten Laois SHC titles in 25 seasons between 1930 and 1954. That year the club also had its greatest Gaelic football triumph when the Laois IFC title was also claimed.

Further Laois SHC titles were won in 1958, 1962 and 1970, however, a long period without success followed. Clonad won its 14th and final Laois SHC title after a 0–16 to 2–07 win over Portlaoise in 1992. The club was relegated to the Laois IHC in 2008, but returned to second tier in 2025, after winning the Laois IHC for the first time.

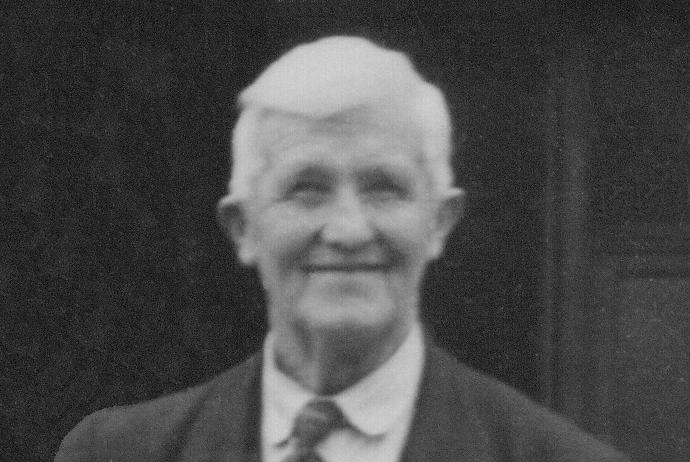
Jim Bergin (1874–1958), cofounder of Clonad GAA

== Honours ==
- Laois Senior Hurling Championship (14): 1930, 1933, 1935, 1937, 1946, 1947, 1948, 1950, 1953, 1954, 1958, 1962, 1970, 1992
- Laois Intermediate Hurling Championship (1): 2025
- Laois Intermediate Football Championship (1): 1954
- Laois Junior A Football Championship (2): 1934, 1940
- Laois Junior B Hurling Championship (1): 2000
- Laois Under-21 B Hurling Championship (2): 1999, 2004
- Laois Minor B Hurling Championship (1): 2003

== Notable players ==
- John Killeen: All-Ireland SHC runner-up (1949)
- Joe McCabe: All-Ireland MHC runner-up (1934)
- Pat Roe: All-Ireland SBFC–winner (1993)
- Paddy Ruschitzko: All-Ireland SHC runner-up (1949)
