= Abbeyleix GAA =

GAA club in Abbeyleix, County Laois, Ireland

Abbeyleix
- Mainistir Laoise
- County: Laois
- Nickname: The Fung
- Colours: Primrose and Blue
- Grounds: Fr Breen Park
- Coordinates: 52°54′46.26″N 7°21′09.73″W

Playing kits
Standard colours

Senior Club Championships
	All Ireland	Leinster champions	Laois champions
Football:	-	-	8
Hurling:	-	-	8

Abbeyleix St Lazerians is a Gaelic Athletic Association club in Abbeyleix, County Laois, Ireland. The club grounds are called Fr Breen Park and the club colours are Primrose and Blue.

== History ==
The club plays at senior level in hurling and has also won eight Laois Senior Football Championship titles, last of which came in 1919.

Hurling is the main game in the club and Abbeyleix holds 8 Laois Senior Hurling Championship titles, the last of which came in 1949.

In 2006, a number of Abbeyleix players were part of the Ballyroan Gaels squad that won the Laois Senior Football Championship. Ballyroan Gaels was an amalgamation of the two neighbouring clubs, Abbeyleix and Ballyroan.

Abbeyleix won the 2007 Laois Intermediate Hurling Championship and returned to the senior grade in 2008.

== Honours ==
- Laois Senior Hurling Championship (8): 1927, 1932, 1934, 1939, 1940, 1944, 1945, 1949
- Laois Premier Intermediate Hurling Championship (1): 2022
- Laois Intermediate Hurling Championship (1): 2007

== Notable players ==
- Patrick Lalor
- Eugene Fennelly, hurled for Laois
