= Rathdowney GAA =

Gaelic games club in County Laois, Ireland

Rathdowney
- Ráth Domhnaigh
- Founded: 1888
- County: Laois
- Colours
- Grounds: Kelly O'Daly Park
- Coordinates: 52°51′12.00″N 7°35′11.97″W

Playing kits
Standard colours

Senior Club Championships
	All Ireland	Leinster champions	Laois champions
Hurling:	0	0	18

Rathdowney GAA is a Gaelic Athletic Association club in Rathdowney, County Laois, Ireland. The club is solely concerned with the game of Gaelic football, after amalgamating at all levels for hurling with neighbouring club Errill in 2005.

== History ==
Located in the town of Rathdowney, close to the Laois-Kilkenny border, Rathdowney GAA Club was founded in 1888. The new club won the inaugural Laois SHC in 1888 and became the first team to win consecutive titles when they retained the title the following year. Rathdowney quickly became a dominant force in hurling and regularly appeared in the latter stages of the championship.

The new century saw Rathdowney win seven Laois SHC titles from ten final appearances between 1901 and 1913. This period of success also saw the club become the first to win three consecutive titles. Rathdowney also had their first major Gaelic football success at this time when the club won the Laois IFC title in 1912.

Rathdowney won their 18th and final Laois SHC title in 1941. It was a record which stood for 49 years until it was bested by Camross. The intervening period saw Rathdowney have some title successes in the lower grades; however, the dominance the club once had in the Laois SHC was no more. After a successful underage hurling merger with Errill, both clubs amalgamated at adult level to form Rathdowney–Errill in February 2005. Rathdowney continued to exist in its own right and fields teams in Gaelic football.

== Honours ==
- Laois Senior Hurling Championship: (18): 1888, 1889, 1898, 1899, 1901, 1902, 1903, 1907, 1908, 1911, 1912, 1921, 1922, 1925, 1926, 1931, 1936, 1941
- Laois Senior A Hurling Championship: (1): 2000
- Laois Intermediate Hurling Championship: (1): 1960
- Laois Intermediate Football Championship: (1): 1912
- Laois Junior A Hurling Championship: (3): 1938, 1954, 2002
- Laois Junior B Hurling Championship: (2): 1974, 1995
- Laois Junior B Football Championship: (1): 1974
- Laois Junior C Football Championship: (2): 1998, 2022
- Laois Under-21 A Hurling Championship: (3): 1971, 1976, 1998
- Laois Under-21 B Hurling Championship: (1): 1992
- Laois Minor Hurling Championship: (11): 1939, 1957, 1958, 1969, 1976, 1977, 1978, 1979, 1981, 1995, 2000

== Notable plyers ==
- Jack Daly: All-Ireland SHC–winner (1915)
- Harry Gray: All-Ireland SHC–winner (1938)
- Paddy McCormack: All-Ireland SHC runner-up (1949)
