= 1888 Laois Senior Hurling Championship =

Annual hurling competition season

- Champions: Rathdowney (1st title); John Fitzgerald (captain)
- Runners-up: Knockaroo

The 1888 Laois Senior Hurling Championship was the inaugural staging of the Laois Senior Hurling Championship since its establishment by the Laois County Board.

The final was played on 13 May 1888 at the Ballybrophy Grounds, between Rathdowney and Knockaroo, in what was their first ever meeting in the final. Rathdowney won the match by 2–02 to 0–01 to claim their first ever championship title.

== Results ==
=== Final ===
13 May 1888 Final	Rathdowney	2-02 - 0-01	Knockaroo	Ballybrophy Grounds
