= 2004–05 All-Ireland Senior Club Football Championship =

Irish Football Championship

- Dates: 23 October 2004 – 17 March 2004
- Teams: 33
- Champions: Ballina Stephenites (1st title); Brian Ruane (captain); Tommy Lyons (manager)
- Runners-up: Portlaoise; Colm Parkinson (captain); Tommy Conroy (manager)

Tournament statistics
- Matches played: 37
- Goals scored: 55 (1.49 per match)
- Points scored: 682 (18.43 per match)
- Top scorer(s): Oisín McConville (3-20)

The 2004–05 All-Ireland Senior Club Football Championship was the 35th staging of the All-Ireland Senior Club Football Championship since its establishment by the Gaelic Athletic Association in 1970-71. The competition began on 23 October 2004 and ended on 17 March 2004.

The defending champion was Caltra; however, the club did not qualify after being beaten by Salthill–Knocknacarra in the quarter-final of the 2004 Galway County Championship.

On 17 March 2005, Ballina Stephenites won the competition following a 1–12 to 2–8 defeat of Portlaoise in the All-Ireland final at Croke Park. It remains the club's only title.

Oisín McConville of Crossmaglen Rangers was the competition's top scorer with 3-20.

== Connacht ==
=== Quarter-final ===
8 November 2004 Quarter-final	Tourlestrane	0-07 - 0-08	Killererin	Markievicz Park
	S Leonard 0-2, J Marren 0-2, M Walsh 0-1, G McGowan 0-1, M Brennan 0-1.		N Joyce 0-4, P Joyce 0-2, T Wilson 0-1, T Joyce 0-1.

=== Semi-finals ===
22 November 2004 Semi-final	Killererin	2-13 - 0-03	Annaduff	Tuam Stadium
	N Joyce 1-7, T Joyce 1-1, P Joyce 0-4, K Courtney 0-1.		T McNabola 0-3.

22 November 2004 Semi-final	Ballina Stephenites	1-18 - 1-05	Roscommon Gaels	James Stephens Park
	L Brady 0-5, E Casey 1-0, S Hughes 0-3, P McGarry 0-2, P Harte 0-2, B McStay 0-2, R McGarnty 0-1, D Brady 0-1, G Brady 0-1, E Devenney 0-1.		M Costello 1-0, A Nolan 0-3, L Dowd 0-2.

=== Final ===
5 December 2004 Final	Ballina Stephenites	1-13 - 2-06	Killererin	James Stephens Park
	L Brady 0-5 (1f), G Brady 1-0, S Hughes, E Devenney 0-2 each, R McGarrity, D Brady, P Harte, E Casey 0-1 each.	Report	P Joyce 1-2, T Flynn 1-0, N Joyce 0-2 (f, sline), T Joyce, D Heneghan 0-1 each.	Referee: H Bernie (Roscommon)

== Leinster ==
=== First round ===
23 October 2004 First round	Kilmacud Crokes	3-09 - 0-06	St Patrick's	Parnell Park
	M Vaughan 2-3, M O'Keeffe 0-4, K O'Carroll 1-0, F Armstrong 0-1, C Murphy 0-1.		S O'Brien 0-3, D Smullen 0-2, B Cornyn 0-1.

23 October 2004 First round	Muckalee	0-04 - 4-07	Rathvilly	Canon Kearns Park
	L Brennan 0-1, S Coonan 0-1, R Ruane 0-1, P Maher 0-1.		M Curran 1-1, D O'Donoghue 1-1, D Nolan 1-1, F Kelly 1-0, B Murphy 0-2, T Bulger 0-1, S Kavanagh 0-1.

23 October 2004 First round	Allenwood	0-11 - 0-06	St Patrick's	St Conleth's Park
	J Doyle 0-6, D Hughes 0-3, E Price 0-1, N O'Callaghan 0-1.		K White 0-3, E Carroll 0-2, D Kirwan 0-1.

23 October 2004 First round	Clonguish	0-08 - 3-10	Rhode	Pearse Park
	P Barden 0-3, C Clarke 0-2, J O'Brien 0-2, C Williams 0-1.		P Glennon 1-2, N McNamee 0-5, R Malone 1-1, P Kelleghan 1-1, A McNamee 0-1.

=== Quarter-finals ===
7 November 2004 Quarter-final	Allenwood	1-07 - 1-08	Skryne	St Conleth's Park
	J Carroll 1-0, J Doyle 0-3, N O'Callaghan 0-2, E Price 0-1, J Byrne 0-1.		M O'Dowd 1-0, J Gibbons 0-2, J Jordan 0-2, K Mulvaney 0-1, T Giles 0-1, B Smyth 0-1, A Carty 0-1.

7 November 2004 Quarter-final	Rhode	0-04 - 3-10	Portlaoise	O'Connor Park
	N McNamee 0-4.		C Parkinson 1-3, P McNulty 1-2, C Rogers 1-1, B Fitzgerald 0-3, B McCormack 0-1.

7 November 2004 Quarter-final	Rathvilly	0-08 - 0-08	Starlights	Dr Cullen Park
	JJ Smith 0-3, B Murphy 0-2, M Ryan 0-1, S Kavanagh 0-1, D Nolan 0-1.		J Hudson 0-8.

13 November 2004 Quarter-final	Kilmacud Crokes	0-14 - 1-10	Garrycaste	Parnell Park
	D Kelleher 0-4, M Vaughan 0-3, C Murphy 0-2, M O'Keeffe 0-2, M Davoren 0-2, L Óg Ó hEineacháin 0-1.		D Dolan 0-5, P Mulvihill 1-1, A Daly 0-1, P Dillon 0-1, R Fox 0-1, C Ryan 0-1.

13 November 2004 Quarter-final replay	Starlights	2-05 - 0-07	Rathvilly	Enniscorthy
	J Hudson 2-4, W Hudson 0-1.		B Murphy 0-2, F Kelly 0-2, S Kavanagh 0-1, D Nolan 0-1, T Bolger 0-1.

=== Semi-finals ===
21 November 2004 Semi-final	Portlaoise	0-14 - 0-08	Kilmacud Crokes	Dr Cullen Park
	P McNulty 0-5 (3f), I Fitzgerald 0-4, C Parkinson 0-2, E Coleman, B Fitzgerald (f), K Fitzpatrick (f) 0-1 each.	Report	L Óg Ó hEineachain 0-2, P Griffin, D Kelleher, N Corkery, M O'Keeffe, F Armstrong, M Vaughan 0-1 each.

21 November 2004 Semi-final	Skryne	1-11 - 0-06	Starlights	St Conleth's Park
	J Jordan 1-3, P O'Donnell, B Smyth 0-2 each, T Giles, J Gibbons, K Mulvaney, K O'Connell 0-1 each.	Report	J Hudson 0-3 (2f), T Mahon, D Ruth, Michael Donohoe 0-1 each.

=== Final ===
5 December 2004 Final	Portlaoise	1-11 - 2-04	Skryne	St Conleth's Park
	B McCormack 0-4; M Delaney 1-1; P McNulty 0-3 (2f); C Parkinson 0-2; K Fitzpatrick 0-1 (f).	Report	T Giles 1-1 (1-0 pen); K O'Connell 1-0; M O'Dowd, K Mulvaney, P O'Donnell 0-1 each.	Referee: S Doyle (Wexford)

== Munster ==
=== Quarter-finals ===
31 October 2004 Quarter-final	Dromcollogher/Broadford	0-12 - 0-13	Kilmurry-Ibrickane	Gaelic Grounds
	M Reidy 0-3, G Noonan 0-3, S Buckley 0-2, D O'Leary 0-1, J Stokes 0-1, P Donnell 0-1, R Lynch 0-1.		J Daly 0-6, M O'Dwyer 0-2, O O'Dwyer 0-1, P O'Dwyer 0-1, E Coughlan 0-1, M Hogan 0-1, S Hickey 0-1.

7 November 2004 Quarter-final	Stradbally	0-11 - 1-07	Loughmore-Castleiney	Fraher Field
	N Curran 0-5, S Cunningham 0-2, J Hearne 0-1, M Walsh 0-1, S Lennon 0-1, G Walsh 0-1.		D Laffan 1-1, M Gleeson 0-3, T Ormond 0-2, J Egan 0-1.

=== Semi-finals ===
14 November 2004 Semi-final	Bishopstown	0-12 - 1-12	Stradbally	Páirc Uí Rinn
	J O'Shea 0-4, J Ferriter 0-4, JA O'Sullivan 0-2, R Honohan 0-1, S Conlisk 0-1.		N Curran 0-6, S Cunningham 1-0, G Power 0-2, M Walsh 0-2, J Halpin 0-1, J Coffey 0-1.

21 November 2004 Semi-final	Kilmurry-Ibrickane	2-07 - 0-08	Milltown/Castlemaine	Quilty
	O O'Dwyer 0-4, S Hickey 1-0, E Coughlan 1-0, J Daly 0-2, D Callinan 0-1.		G Wren 0-3, D Twiss 0-1, A Giles 0-1, D Kelleher 0-1, I Twiss 0-1, F Murphy 0-1.

=== Final ===
5 December 2004 Final	Kilmurry-Ibrickane	0-09 - 0-09	Stradbally	Semple Stadium
	N Curran 0-4 (3f), G Power 0-2, M Walsh, J Hearne, S Cunningham 0-1 each.	Report	J Daly 0-4 (3f), M O'Dwyer 0-3, A Corry, P O'Dwyer 0-1 each.	Referee: Michael Collins (Cork)

12 December 2004 Final replay	Kilmurry-Ibrickane	0-09 - 0-08	Stradbally	FitzGerald Park, Kilmallock
	J Daly 0-5 (3f), M O'Dwyer 0-3, A Corry 0-1.	Report	N Curran 0-4 (3f), S Cunningham, M Walsh, G Power, J Hearne 0-1 each.	Referee: Paddy Russell (Tipperary)

== Ulster ==
=== Preliminary round ===
24 October 2004 Preliminary round	Derrygonnelly Harps	0-05 - 3-11	Carrickmore	Brewster Park
	P Greene 0-2, J McGurn 0-1, D Ward 0-1, N McGrath 0-1.		P Loughran 1-5, C McAleer 1-2, G McCallan 1-1, B Gormely 0-3.

=== Quarter-final ===
7 November 2004 Quarter-final	Carrickmore	0-12 - 1-09	St Gall's	Healy Park
	P Loughran 0-5, K McNally 0-4, M Donnelly 0-1, D McElroy 0-1, Conor McAleer 0-1.		C Gallagher 1-1, K Stewart 0-3, S Burns 0-3, M McCrory 0-2.

7 November 2004 Quarter-final	Ard an Rátha	1-11 - 1-11	Mayobridge	MacCumhaill Park
	J Boyle 0-5, P McHugh 1-0, J Hernon 0-2, M Doherty 0-2, B Boyle 0-1, S McHugh 0-1.		R Coulter 0-4, J Quinn 1-0, M Linden 0-2, B Coulter 0-2, N Sexton 0-1, E Woods 0-1, A Barry 0-1.

7 November 2004 Quarter-final	Cavan Gaels	2-12 - 0-09	Magheracloone	Kingspan Breffni Park
	N Collins 1-1, S Johnston 0-4, M Graham 1-0, M Lyng 0-3, A Forde 0-1, E King 0-1, D Reilly 0-1, C Nelligan 0-1.		T Freeman 0-3, P Jones 0-2, F Kindlon 0-2, P Kirk 0-1, P Finnegan 0-1.

7 November 2004 Quarter-final	Slaughtneil	0-14 - 1-11	Crossmaglen Rangers	Watty Graham Park
	Paul Bradley 0-9, J Kelly 0-3, B McGuigan 0-1, C Cassidy 0-1.		O McConville 1-3, A Kernan 0-2, S Kernan 0-2, J Murtagh 0-2, J McEntee 0-1, J Hughes 0-1.

14 November 2004 Quarter-final replay	Mayobridge	2-17 - 0-08	CLG Ard an Rátha	Páirc Esler
	R Coulter 1-6, N Sexton 1-0, B Coulter 0-3, J Quinn 0-3, D Rooney 0-2, D Tighe 0-1, E Woods 0-1, M Linden 0-1.		J Boyle 0-4, D Diver 0-2, S McHugh 0-2.

14 November 2004 Quarter-final replay	Crossmaglen Rangers	1-05 - 0-07	Slaughtneil	Oliver Plunkett Park
	O McConville 1-3, M McNamee 0-2.		J Kelly 0-3, Paul Bradley 0-3, N Convery 0-1.

14 November 2004 Quarter-final replay	St Gall's	0-10 - 1-11	Carrickmore	Casement Park
	S Burns 0-3, K Stewart 0-3, C McGourty 0-2, C Gallagher 0-2.		P Loughran 0-5, B Gormley 1-1, C McGurk 0-1, D McElroy 0-1, C Gormley 0-1, K McNally 0-1, M Donnelly 0-1.

=== Semi-finals ===
21 November 2004 Semi-final	Mayobridge	2-07 - 0-11	Carrickmore	Casement Park
	R Coulter 1-3, B Coulter 1-1, M Linden 0-1, J Quinn 0-1, B Grant 0-1.		F Magill 0-3, M Gallagher 0-2, M Donnelly 0-1, B Gormley 0-1, K McNally 0-1, Ciaran McAleer 0-1, P Loughran 0-1, P Hughes 0-1.

21 November 2004 Semi-final	Crossmaglen Rangers	1-10 - 0-10	Cavan Gaels	Brewster Park
	C Short 1-0, S Kernan 0-2, J Murtagh 0-2, O McConville 0-2, C O'Neill 0-1, A Kernan 0-1, S Clarke 0-1, M McNamee 0-1.		A Forde 0-2, M Lyng 0-2, C Nelligan 0-2, N Collins 0-1, E King 0-1, P O'Donnell 0-1, S Johnston 0-1.

=== Final ===
28 November 2004 Final	Crossmaglen Rangers	0-14 - 0-09	Mayobridge	Casement Park
	J Murtagh 0-6, O McConville 0-5 (5f), M McNamee, C Short, A Kernan (f) 0-1 each.	Report	R Coulter (2f), N Sexton, B Coulter 0-3 each.	Referee: M Hughes (Tyrone)

== Quarter-final ==
5 December 2004 Quarter-final	Kingdom Kerry Gaels	1-09 - 2-10	Crossmaglen Rangers	Emerald GAA Grounds
	G Weldon 0-4 (2f); C Foody 0-3; J Landy 1-0; E Brennan, P McDonagh 0-1 each.	Report; Report 2	O McConville 1-4 (4f, 1-0 pen); C Short 1-1; J Murtagh, S Clarke 0-2 each; A Kernan 0-1.	Referee: P Fox (Westmeath)

== Semi-finals ==
20 February 2004 Semi-final	Ballina Stephenites	0-10 - 0-08	Kilmurry-Ibrackane	Pearse Stadium
	L Brady 0-5 (2fs), P Harte 0-3, R McGarrity and D Brady 0-1 each.	Report	M O'Dwyer 0-3, J Daly 0-3 (3fs), S Hickey 0-1, O O'Dwyer 0-1 (f).	Referee: JM Quilligan (Cavan)

20 February 2004 Semi-final	Portlaoise	0-08 - 0-07	Crossmaglen Rangers	Parnell Park
	P McNulty 0-5 (4fs); M Delaney, I Fitzgerald, B Fitzgerald (f) 0-1 each.	Report	O McConville 0-3 (fs); J McEntee 0-2; G O'Neill, M McNamee 0-1 each.	Referee: Paddy Russell (Tipperary)

== Final ==
17 March 2005 Final	Ballina Stephenites	1-12 - 2-08	Portlaoise	Croke Park
	L Brady 0-5 (3f), S Hughes 1-0, P Harte 0-2 (1f), G Brady, D Brady, P McHale, E Casey, B Ruane all 0-1 each.	Report	K Fitzpatrick 2-0 (1-0 pen), P McNulty 0-4 (3f), C Parkinson, C Rogers, B McCormack, B Fitzgerald all 0-1 each.	Referee: Brian Crowe (Cavan)

== Statistics ==
=== Top scorers ===
Overall

Rank	Player	County	Tally	Total	Matches	Average
1	Oisín McConville	Crossmaglen Rangers	3-20	29	6	4.83
2	Robbie Coulter	Mayobridge	2-16	22	4	5.50
2	Peter McNulty	Portlaoise	1-19	22	5	4.40
3	John Hudson	Starlights	2-15	21	3	7.00
4	Johnny Daly	Kilmurry-Ibrickane	0-20	20	5	4.00
4	Liam Brady	Ballina Stephenites	0-20	20	4	5.00
5	Peter Loughran	Carrickmore	1-16	16	4	4.00
5	Niall Curran	Stradbally	0-19	19	4	4.75
6	Nicky Joyce	Killererin	1-13	16	3	5.33
7	Mark Vaughan	Kilmacud Crokes	2-07	13	3	4.33

In a single game

Rank	Player	County	Tally	Total	Opposition
1	John Hudson	Starlights	2-04	10	Rathvilly
1	Nicky Joyce	Killererin	1-07	10	Annaduff
2	Mark Vaughan	Kilmacud Crokes	2-03	9	St Patrick's
2	Robbie Coulter	Mayobridge	1-06	9	Ardara
2	Paul Bradley	Slaughtneil	0-09	9	Crossmaglen Rangers
3	Peter Loughran	Carrickmore	1-05	8	Derrygonnelly Harps
3	John Hudson	Starlights	0-08	8	Rathvilly
4	Oisín McConville	Crossmaglen Rangers	1-04	7	Kingdom Kerry Gaels
5	Kevin Fitzpatrick	Portlaoise	2-00	6	Ballina Stephenites
5	Colm Parkinson	Portlaoise	1-03	6	Rhode
5	Jamie Jordan	Skryne	1-03	6	Starlights
5	Oisín McConville	Crossmaglen Rangers	1-03	6	Slaughtneil
5	Oisín McConville	Crossmaglen Rangers	1-03	6	Slaughtneil
5	Robbie Coulter	Mayobridge	1-03	6	Carrickmore
5	John Doyle	Allenwood	0-06	6	St Patrick's
5	Johnny Daly	Kilmurry-Ibrickane	0-06	6	Dromcollogher/Broadford
5	Niall Curran	Stradbally	0-06	6	Bishopstown
5	John Murtagh	Crossmaglen Rangers	0-06	6	Mayobridge

=== Miscellaneous ===
- Portlaoise became the first team to win six Leinster Club Championship titles.
