= Peter McNulty =

Peter McNulty may refer to:

- Peter McNulty (film editor), film editor
- Peter McNulty (Gaelic footballer) (1985–2010), Gaelic footballer
- Peter H. McNulty, merchant, real estate operator and politician in New York
