= County Hall, Portlaoise =

Municipal building in County Laois, Ireland

- Áras an Chontae, Port Laoise
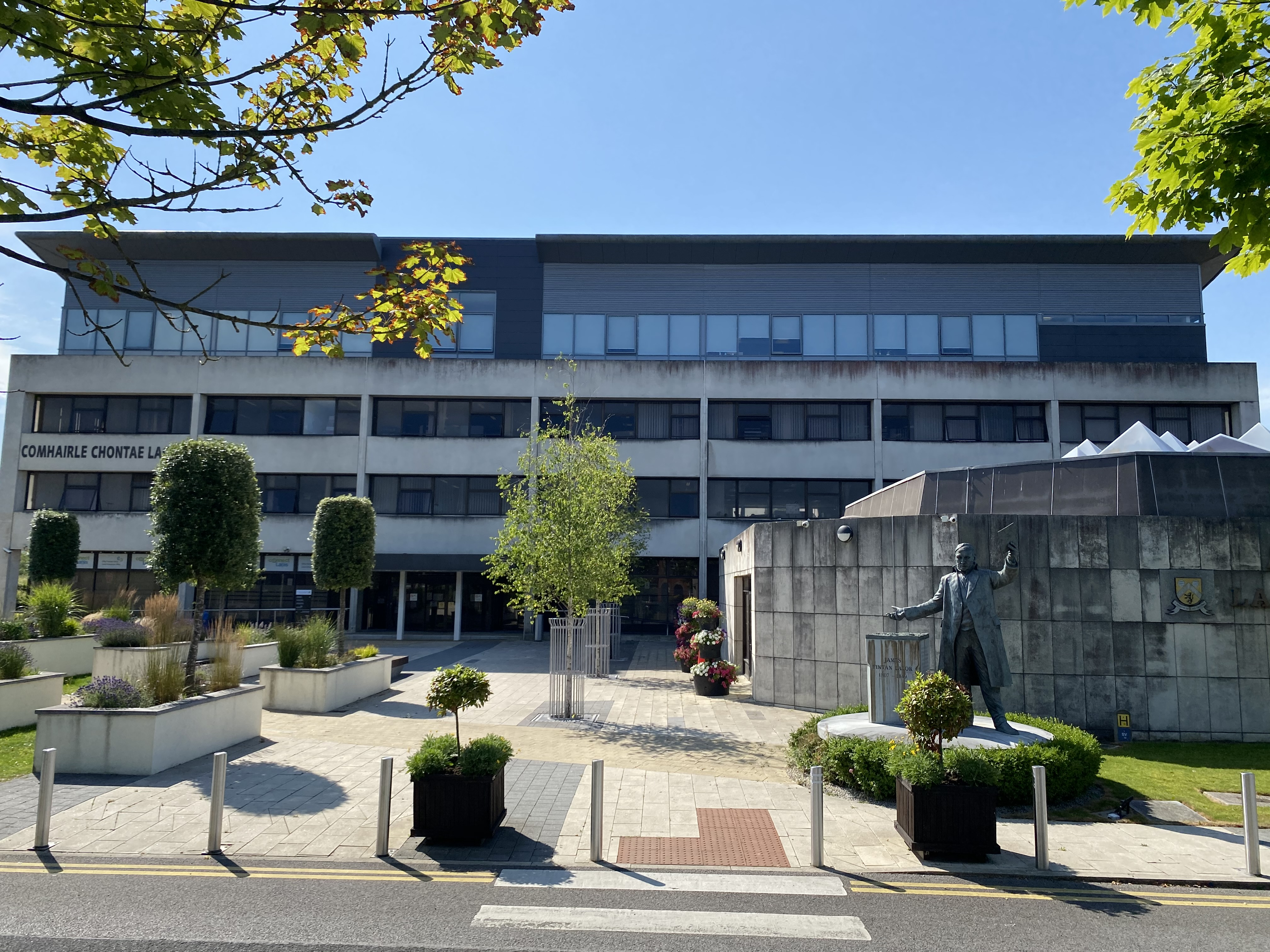
- County Hall in July 2021

- Location within Ireland

General information
- Architectural style: Modern style
- Location: Portlaoise, County Laois, Ireland
- Coordinates: 53.0315°N 7.3008°W
- Completed: 1982

County Hall (Irish: Áras an Chontae, Port Laoise) is a municipal facility in Portlaoise, County Laois, Ireland.

== History ==
Originally meetings of Laois County Council were held in Portlaoise Courthouse. After the courthouse became inadequate, a purpose-built facility was built in May 1982. An extension, linked to the existing County Hall building by a single storey glazed corridor, was completed in 2007.
