= Kevin Fitzpatrick (Gaelic footballer) =

Irish Gaelic footballer

Personal information
- Native name: Caoimhín Mac Giolla Phádraig (Irish)
- Nickname: Fitzy
- Born: Portlaoise, County Laois

Sport
- Sport: Gaelic Football
- Position: Centre Forward
Club
- Years: Club
- Portlaoise
Club titles
- Laois titles: 15
- Leinster titles: 2
Inter-county
- Years: County
- Laois
Inter-county titles
- Leinster titles: 1

Kevin Fitzpatrick is a former Gaelic football player from County Laois in Ireland.

He played club football for Portlaoise. At club level, he won multiple Laois Senior Football Championship titles with Portlaoise and captained the team in 2008. Fitzpatrick was part of the Laois minor team that won the county's first All-Ireland Minor Football Championship title in 1996.

In 2003, he was a member of the Laois senior team that won the Leinster Senior Football Championship for the first time in 57 years. He was sent off in the final and subsequently missed the All-Ireland quarter-final against Armagh county football team
