= Wolf Hill =

Wolf Hill may refer to:

- Langshan (Nantong) or Wolf Hill, China

== See also ==
- Wolfhill, a village in Perthshire, Scotland
