= Portlaoise Courthouse =

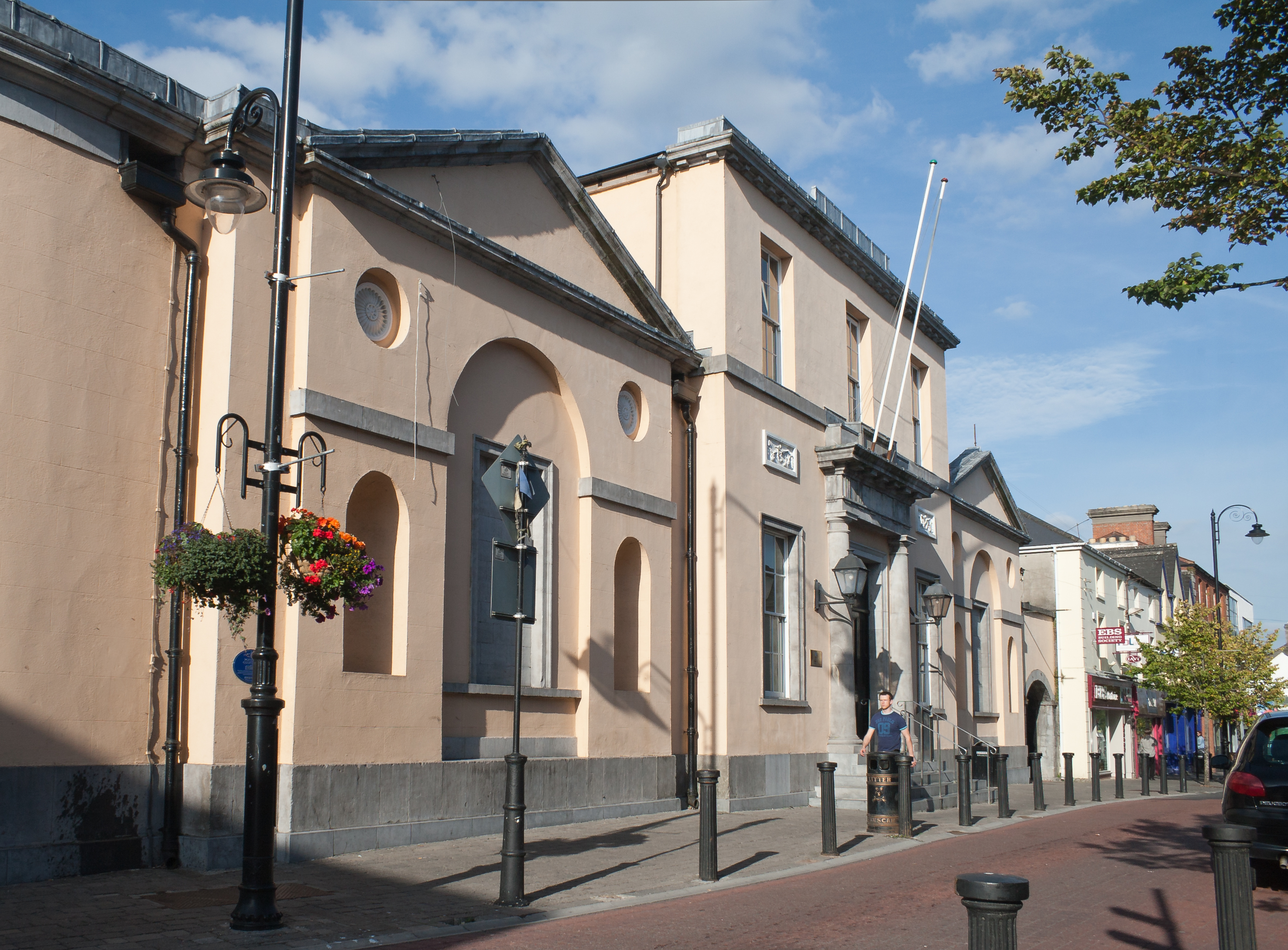
- Portlaoise Courthouse

- Location within Ireland

General information
- Architectural style: Neoclassical style
- Location: Portlaoise, County Laois, Ireland
- Coordinates: 53.0342°N 7.2998°W
- Completed: 1805

Design and construction
- Architect: Sir Richard Morrison

Portlaoise Courthouse is a judicial facility in Portlaoise, County Laois, Ireland.

== History ==
The courthouse, which was designed by Sir Richard Morrison in the neoclassical style and built in ashlar stone, was completed in 1805. It was re-modelled to the designs of James Rawson Carroll in 1875. The design involved a symmetrical main frontage of five bays facing Main Street with the end bays forming pavilions; the central section of three bays, which slightly projected forward, featured a doorway flanked by Doric order columns supporting an entablature and a panel; there were three sash windows on the first floor and a modillioned cornice at roof level.

The building was primarily used as a facility for dispensing justice but, following the implementation of the Local Government (Ireland) Act 1898, which established county councils in every county, the Grand Jury Room also became the meeting place for Laois County Council. After the courthouse became inadequate, the county council moved to County Hall in May 1982. In order to accommodate the large caseload of the court, which had become the second busiest in Ireland, in May 2019, the county council announced plans to build a new courthouse outside the town. A site for the new building was secured in November 2019.
