= Pat Critchley =

Irish sportsman

Personal information
- Nicknames: Zoom, GOAT
- Born: Portlaoise, County Laois

Sport
Club
- Years: Club
- Portlaoise
Inter-county
- Years: County
- Laois
Inter-county titles
- All Stars: 1

Pat Critchley is a sportsman from County Laois, Ireland. He has played at senior level in hurling, football and handball. He is a member of Portlaoise GAA club, with whom he won eight Laois Senior county championships - four each in hurling and football. He guided IT Carlow to the Sigerson cup final 2020.

== Playing career ==
Critchley has won one Leinster and one All-Ireland club football championship with Portlaoise. Critchley also won one Limerick county Football championship.

He was awarded Laois's sole hurling All Stars Award in 1985 and remains the only Laois player to receive this award.

== Coaching career ==
Critchley has coached Scoil Chriost Ri, Portlaoise basketball teams to eleven All-Ireland finals, winning five, and led the school to an All-Ireland football title.

Critchley occupies a full-time coaching and development role with the Laois GAA County Board and is the instigator of the successful Setanta Hurling program and the follow on Cuchulainn program.

== Personal life ==
Pat was a physical education and English teacher at Scoil Chriost Ri, Portlaoise. His autobiography is called Hungry Hill.
