= James Croll =

Scottish scientist (1821–1890)

James Croll FRS
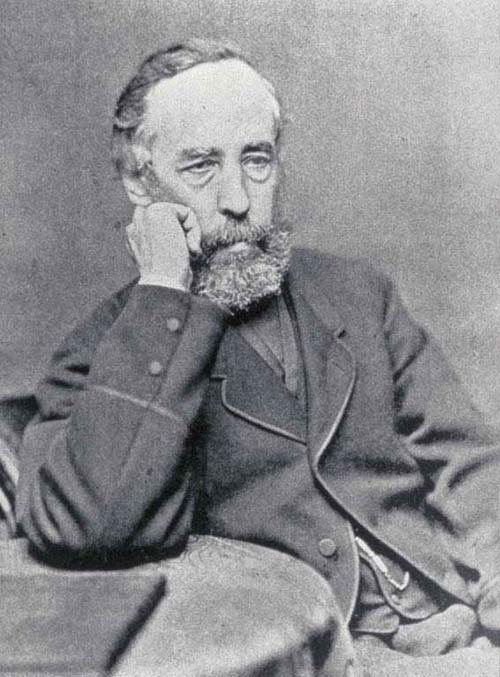
- Born: 2 January 1821; Little Whitefield, Perthshire, Scotland
- Died: 15 December 1890 (aged 69); Perth, Scotland
- Citizenship: British
- Occupation: Scientist
- Spouse: Isabella Macdonald (m. 1848–1890)

James Croll, FRS, (2 January 1821 – 15 December 1890) was a Scottish scientist who developed a theory of climate variability based on changes in the Earth's orbit.

== Life ==
James Croll was born in 1821 on the farm of Little Whitefield, near Wolfhill in Perthshire, Scotland, the son of David Croll, mason, and his wife Janet Geddes. He was largely self-educated. At 16 he became an apprentice wheelwright at Collace near Wolfhill, and then because of health problems a tea merchant in Elgin, Moray. In 1848 he married Isabella Macdonald, daughter of John Macdonald and Annabella Sime, of Forres.

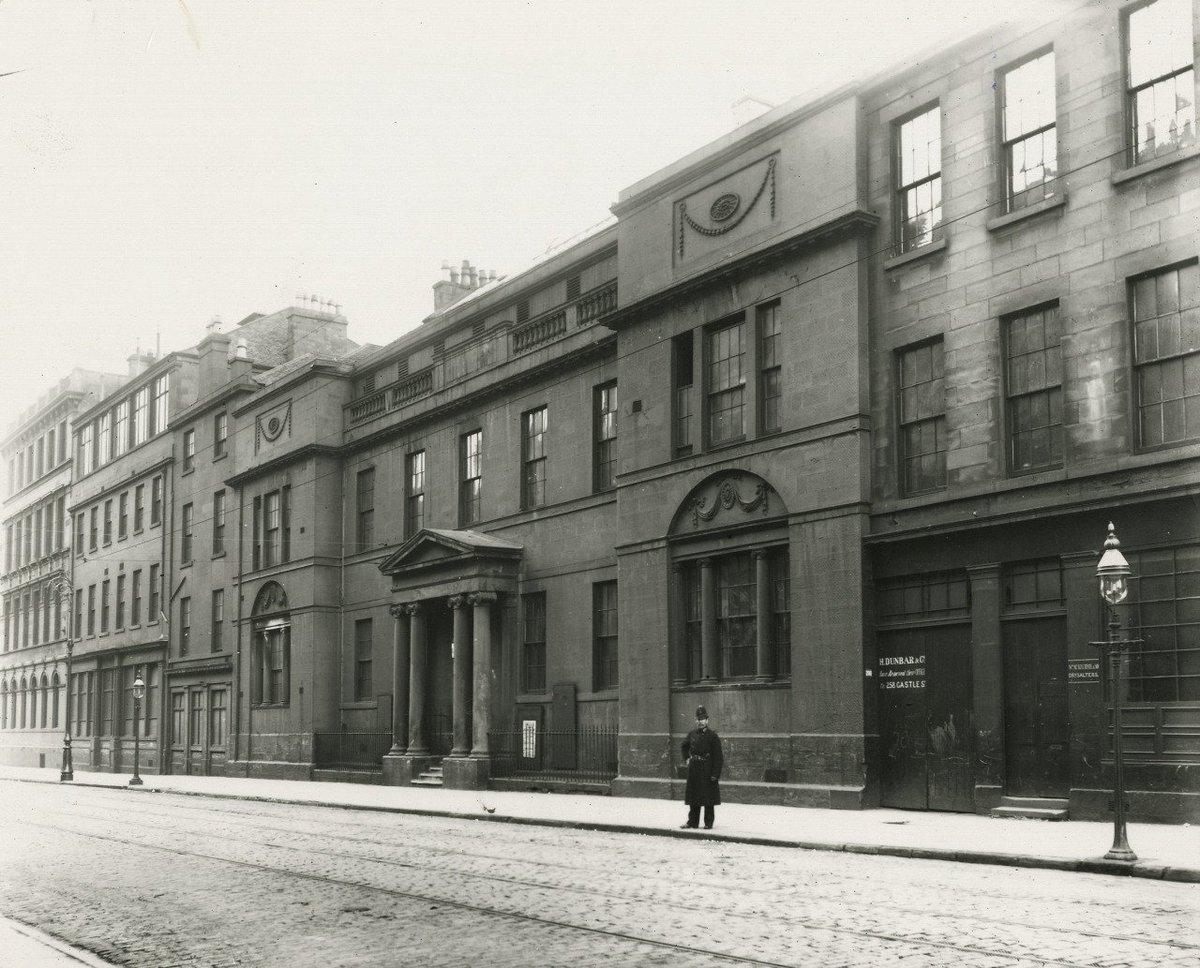
The Museum at the Andersonian University in Glasgow. The building was demolished in 1904 and replaced by the Royal College Building. Location: 55.8613°N 4.2464°W

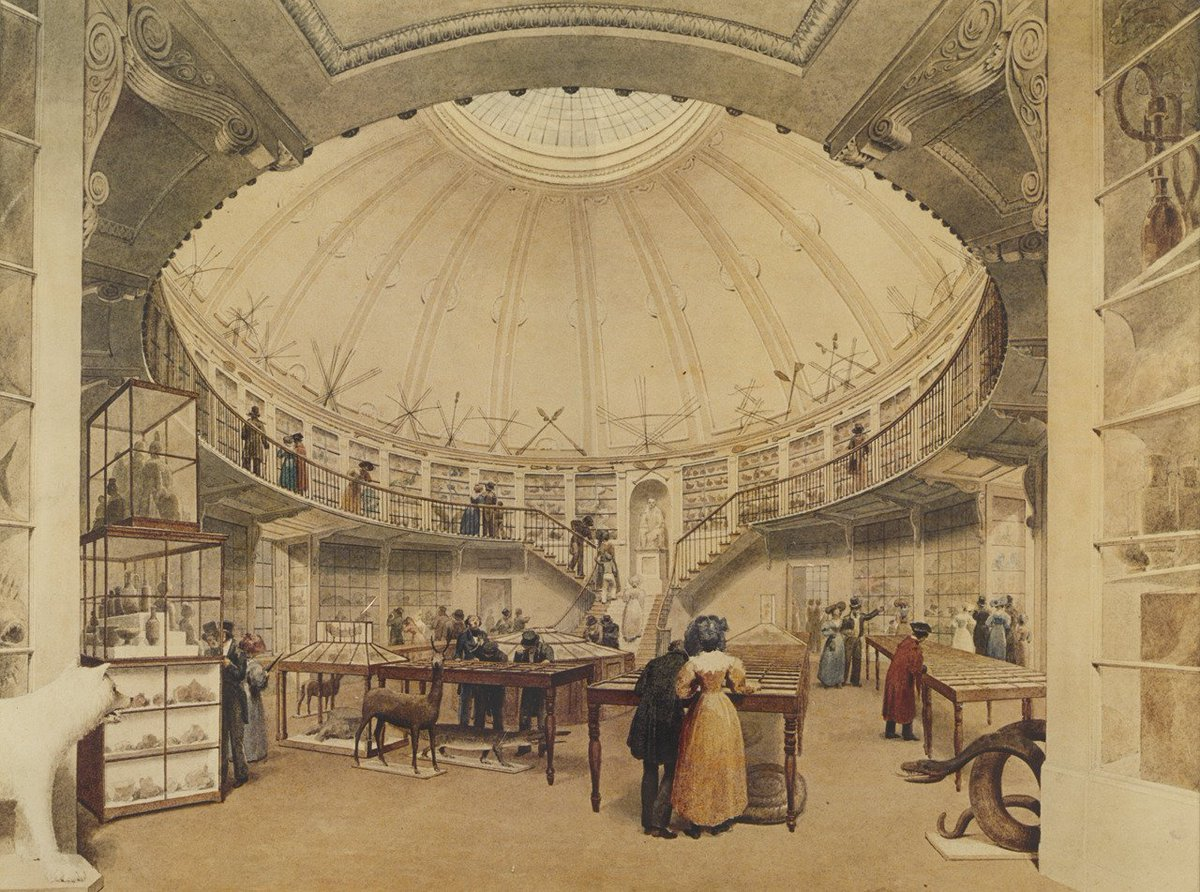
The interior of the Andersonian University Museum

In the 1850s he managed a temperance hotel in Blairgowrie, and was then an insurance agent in Glasgow, Edinburgh and Leicester. In 1859, he became a janitor at the museum of the Andersonian University in Glasgow. He was able to use the university library to get access to books, and taught himself physics and astronomy to develop his ideas.

From 1864, Croll corresponded with Sir Charles Lyell, on links between ice ages and variations in the Earth's orbit. He theorised that changes in the Earth's orbit could cause the Gulf Stream to be diverted, bringing less heat to the Arctic. More ice would then lead to more sunlight being reflected, causing a feedback loop. His ideas were published in the Philosophical Magazine in 1864, attributed to "James Croll, Anderson's University".

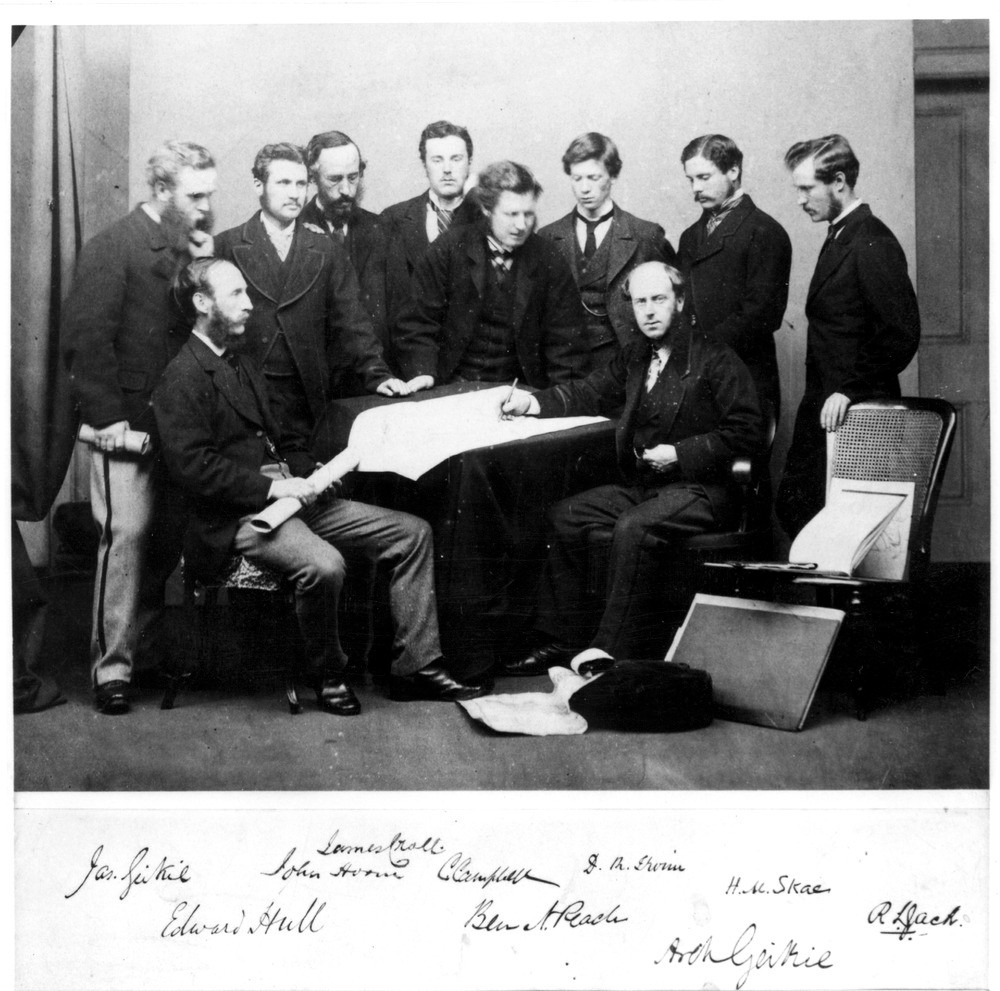
Scottish Geological Survey Staff in 1868, Croll standing third from the left

This led to a position in the Edinburgh office of the Geological Survey of Scotland, as keeper of maps and correspondence, where the director, Sir Archibald Geikie, encouraged his research. He published a number of books and papers which "were at the forefront of contemporary science", including Climate and Time, in Their Geological Relations in 1875. He corresponded with Charles Darwin on erosion by rivers.

In 1876, he was elected Fellow of the Royal Society, and awarded an honorary degree by the University of St Andrews. He retired in 1880 because of ill health.

== Death ==
Croll died on 15 December 1890 at 5 Pitcullen Crescent, in Perth. He was buried in a family grave in Cargill, Perthshire.

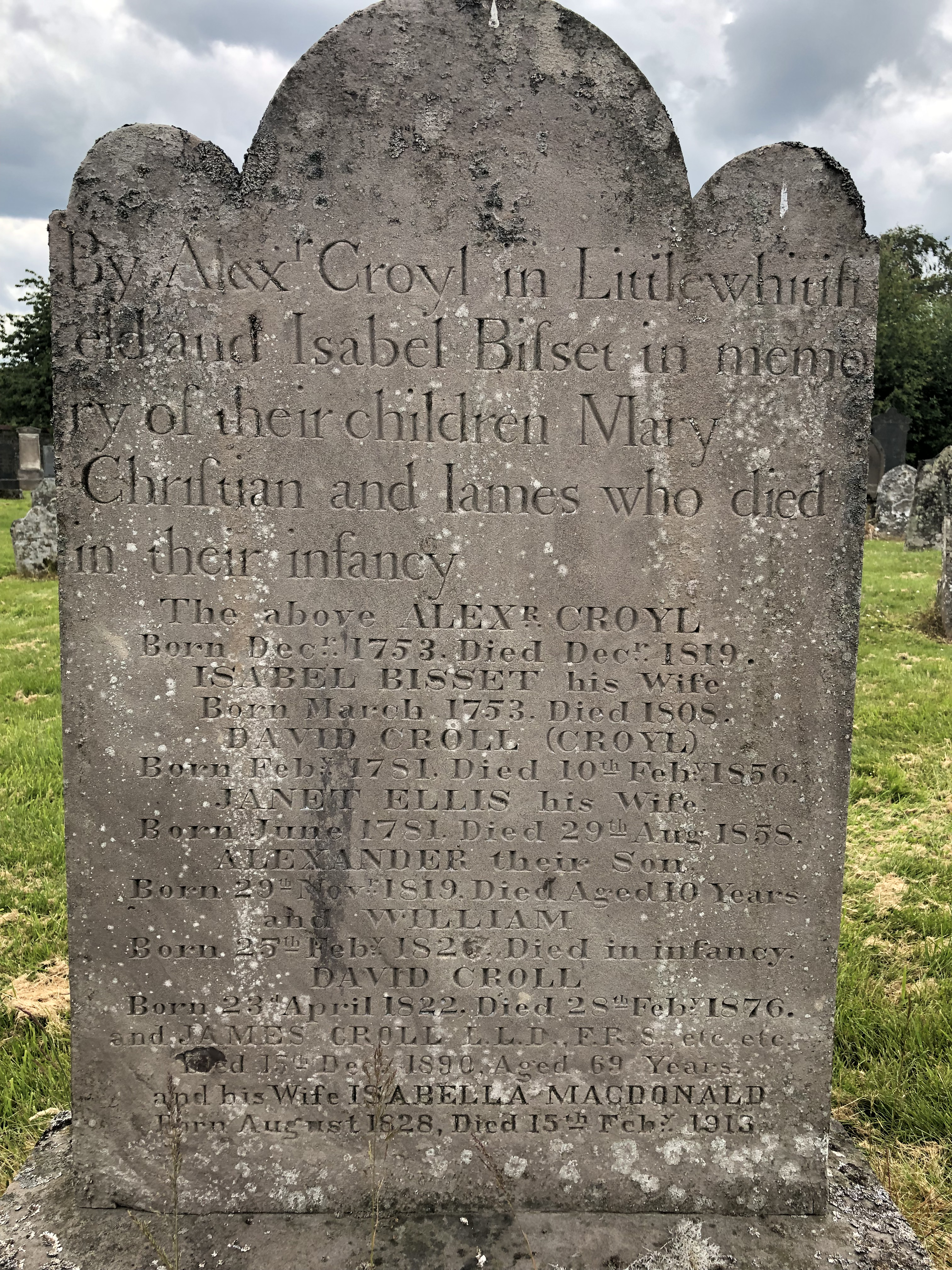
James Croll's family headstone at Cargill cemetery. Croll and his wife's names at the bottom. Location: 56.51739°N 3.38247°W

Croll's work has been widely recognised in scientific circles and societies. The highest award of the Quaternary Research Association is the James Croll Medal.

== Theory of ice ages ==
Croll was the leading proponent of an astronomical-based theory of climate change, now known as the "Astronomical Theory of Climate Change". Using formulae for orbital variations developed by Urbain Le Verrier (which had led to the discovery of Neptune), Croll developed a theory of the effects of variations of the Earth's orbit on climate cycles. His idea was that decreases in winter sunlight would favour snow accumulation, and for the first time coupled this to the idea of a positive ice-albedo feedback to amplify the solar variations. Croll further argued that the accumulation of snow would change the pattern of trade winds, leading to the deflection of warming currents like the Gulf Stream, and finally a self-sustaining ice age. He suggested that when orbital eccentricity is high winters will tend to be colder when the Earth is further from the sun in that season and hence, that during periods of high orbital eccentricity, ice ages occur on 22,000-year cycles in each hemisphere, and alternate between southern and northern hemispheres, lasting approximately 10,000 years each.

Croll's theory predicted multiple ice ages, asynchronous in northern and southern hemispheres, and that the last ice ages should have ended about 80,000 years ago. Evidence was just then emerging of multiple ice ages, and geologists were interested in a theory to explain this. Geologists were not then able to date sediments accurately enough to determine if glaciation was synchronous between the hemispheres, though the limited evidence more pointed towards synchronicity than not. More crucially, estimates of the recession rate of the Niagara Falls indicated that the last ice age ended 6,000 to 35,000 years ago – a large range, but enough to rule out Croll's theory, to those who accepted the measurements.

Croll's work was widely discussed, but by the end of the 19th century, his theory was generally discredited. However, the basic idea of orbitally-forced insolation variations influencing terrestrial temperatures – now known generally as Milankovitch cycles – was further developed by Milutin Milankovitch and eventually, in modified form, triumphed in 1976. A number of scholars have argued that Croll's contribution was sufficiently fundamental as to describe the orbital cycles as Croll-Milankovitch Cycles.

== Works ==
- 1857: The Philosophy of Theism
- 1864: XIII. On the Physical Cause of the Change of Climate During Geological Epochs. The London, Edinburgh, and Dublin Philosophical Magazine and Journal of Science 28 (187) 121–137. https://doi.org/10.1080/14786446408643733
- 1867: XVII. On the Excentricity of the Earth's Orbit and its Physical Relations to the Glacial Epoch. The London, Edinburgh, and Dublin Philosophical Magazine and Journal of Science 33 (221) 119–131. https://doi.org/10.1080/14786446708639757
- 1875: Climate and Time, in Their Geological Relations, a Theory of Secular Changes of the Earth's Climate. London: Edward Stanford.
- 1885: Climate and Cosmology
- 1889: Stellar Evolution and Its Relations to Geological Time
- 1896: posthumous publication of Autobiographical Sketch of James Croll, With Memoir of His Life and Work, edited by J. C. Irons

== Notes ==
Attribution

This article incorporates text from a publication now in the public domain: Bonney, Thomas George (1901). "Croll, James". In Lee, Sidney (ed.). Dictionary of National Biography (1st supplement). London: Smith, Elder & Co.
