= Gareth Dillon =

Irish Gaelic footballer

Gareth Dillon is a Gaelic football player with Portlaoise GAA and Laois GAA. He made his inter county debut on 7 February 2015, against Cavan. Dillon was named Laois Footballer of the Year in 2017.

Dillon is a former University College Dublin golf scholarship recipient and scratch player. He represented UCD from 2006 - 2009.
