= Guildtown =

Village in Perth and Kinross, Scotland

Coordinates: 56°28′13″N 3°24′31″W

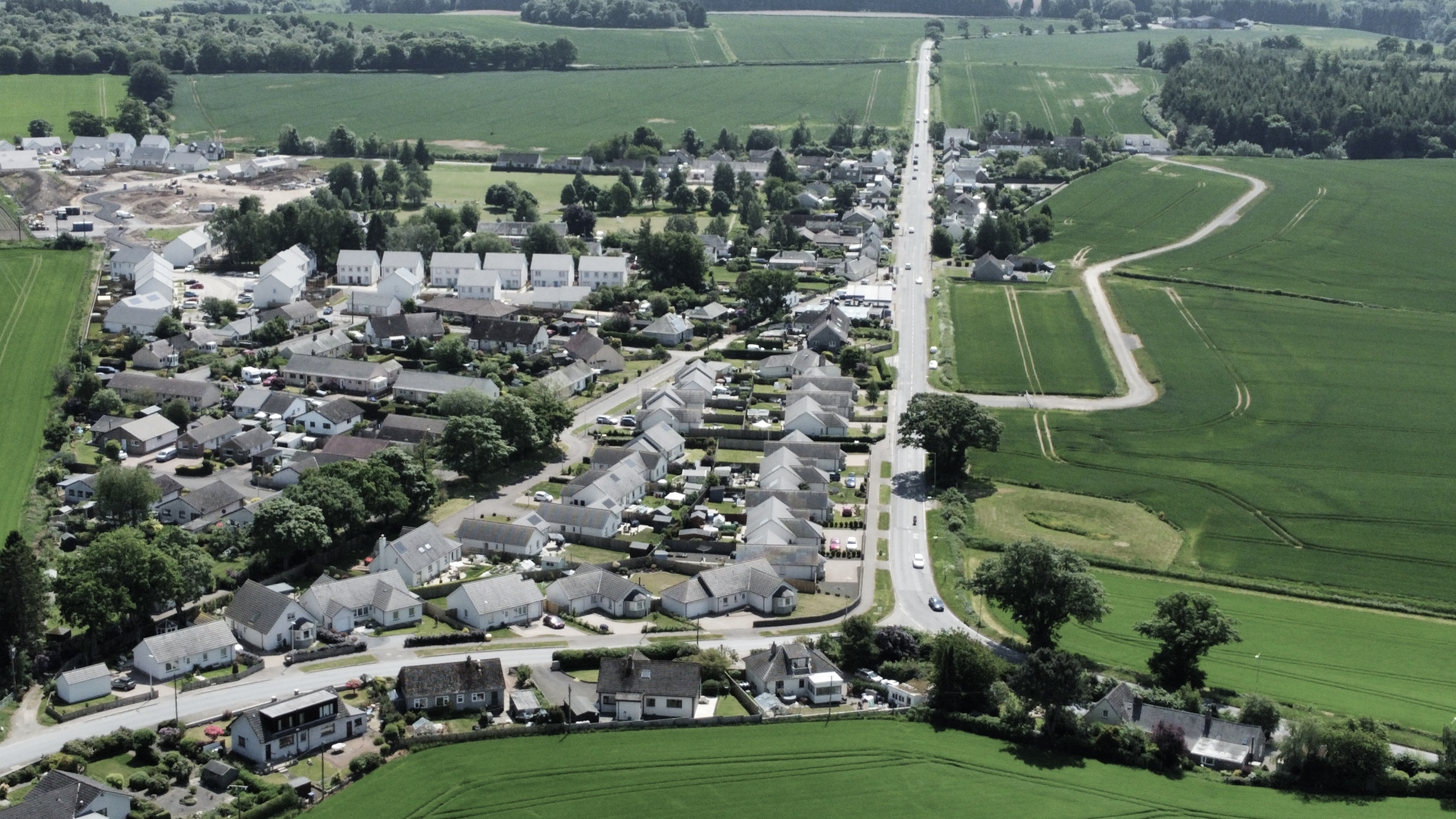
- A view of Guildtown from the north

- Location within Perth and Kinross
- Population: 270
- OS grid reference: NO 133 316
- Council area: Perth and Kinross
- Country: Scotland
- Sovereign state: United Kingdom
- Police: Scotland
- Fire: Scottish
- Ambulance: Scottish
- UK Parliament: Angus and Perthshire Glens
- Scottish Parliament: Perth Mid Scotland and Fife

Guildtown is a village in Perth and Kinross, Scotland, founded in the year 1818 by the Guildry Incorporation of Perth. It is located roughly 6 miles (9.7 km) north of Perth and 9 miles (14 km) south of Blairgowrie on the A93 road. It has a population of between 270 and 400 people. In 2018, it celebrated its bicentennial, commemorated by a road sign at the south end of the village.

== Geography ==
On a map Guildtown is vaguely shaped like the letter Y, with Main Road (A93) running north until it joins Wolfhill Road from the north-east, as Main Road turns north-west. To the east of the village there is the Blackfaulds Stone Circle, consisting of 10 stones.

== Facilities ==
=== Guildtown Primary School and Nursery ===
A small primary school with a single classroom, a library and a kitchen. It also serves the nearby villages of Wolfhill, Newmiln and St Martins. It is a feeder school for Perth Academy. The second classroom was recently converted into a nursery. It does not own any sports grounds as it uses those at the public park, with which it borders. Every year it holds the Interschool Sports, a sports-day like event in collaboration with Balbeggie, Collace and Burrelton primary schools.

=== Village Hall ===
The village hall, opened in 1911 as a public library and extended in 2004, the hall is available to rent for events. It has changing rooms for the sports grounds which is let to Wolfhill AFC. The hall space can be rented with the use of the kitchen for events. In elections it is often used as a polling station for the surrounding area. It has two 7 kW electric car chargers.

=== Park ===
The park is home to football pitches, a combination of tennis, basketball Astro court, and a playpark.

On 27 June 2013 a new playpark was opened approximately 30 metres to the east of the former one, which was unsuitable due to frequent flooding.

In May 2022 sections of the park were set aside as 'area to be allowed to naturalise'. These areas are not maintained, encouraging biodiversity.

Guildtown Hall has been the home of Wolfhill Amateur Football Club since its formation in June 2003. The club play in Division 2 of the Perthshire Amateur Football Association. Wolfhill AFC maintain the playing field on behalf of the Guildtown Hall and Playing Field Association.

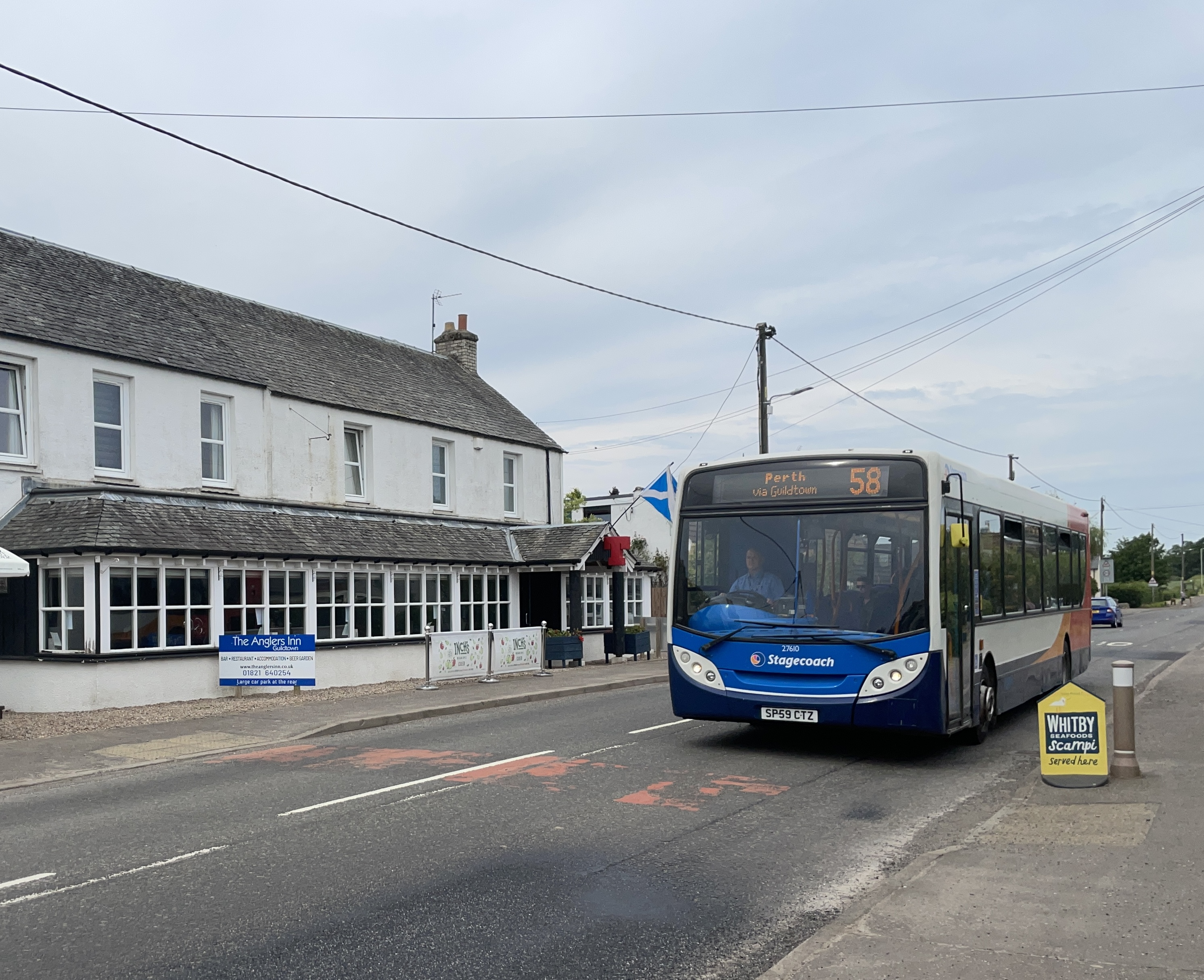
A southbound bus outside the Anglers Inn

=== Transit ===
Guildtown is serviced by the 58 and 58A bus routes between Perth and Blairgowrie, operated by Stagecoach East Scotland. It receives 6 buses a day in either direction on weekdays, 9 on Saturdays and 3 on Sundays during normal operation.

== Developments ==
=== Stephens ===
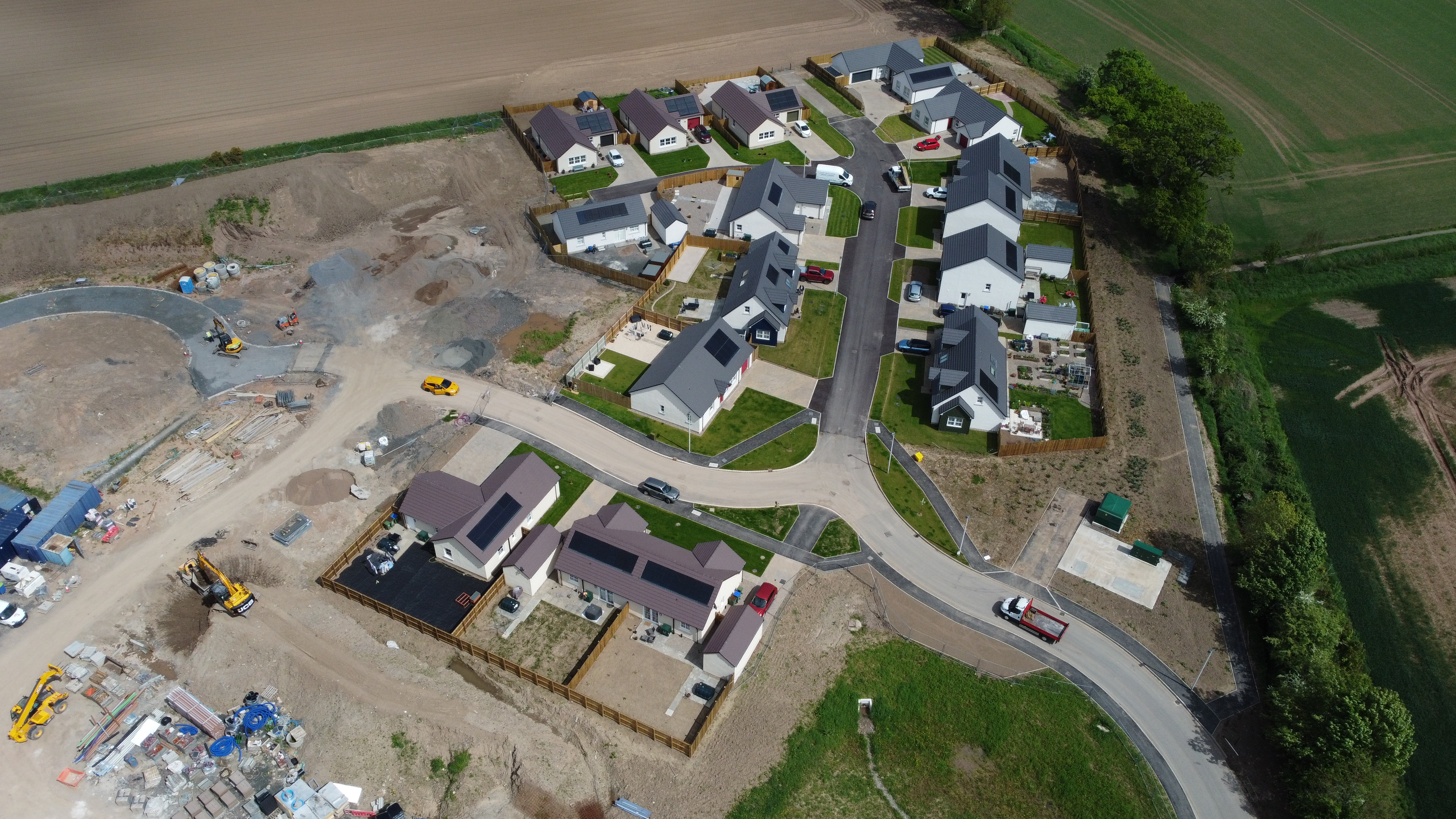
Construction work at the south end of the Stephens Phase 2 development

Stephens were in the process of erecting 84 new homes. Phase one was completed in 2016 and consisted of 20 homes, mostly bungalows, in the north of the village. Phase two expands the village to the east with 64 homes and accompanying infrastructure, including 2 SUDS and a substation. It is currently sitting unfinished, with residents having moved into plots at the north and south ends of the development.

=== Scone Estates ===
Scone Estates, under their 'Guildtown 2036' plan, held meetings with community representatives in February 2022 and with the public in June 2022 as part of a public consultation for developing the field to the west of the village, citing new opportunities created by the construction of the Cross Tay Link Road. If executed, this would increase the area of the village by 138%, from 40.1 acres (after the Stephens plan is completed) to 95.4 acres.
