= John Taylor (hurler) =

Irish hurler and Gaelic footballer

John Taylor is a retired hurling and Gaelic football player from County Laois, in Ireland.

Taylor normally played at left half back in his preferred game hurling and won eight Laois Senior Hurling Championship medals with his club, Portlaoise.

He also won Laois Senior Football Championship medals with Portlaoise.

Since ending his playing career, Taylor has moved into team management with Trumera, Mountrath and Laois.
