= Portlaoise GAA =

Gaelic games club in County Laois, Ireland

- CLG Portlaoise
- Founded: 1887
- County: Laois
- Nickname: The Town, The Magpies
- Colours: White and green
- Grounds: Páirc Uí Fhaoláin and Rathleague
- Coordinates: 53°01′30″N 7°15′49″W

Playing kits
Standard colours

Senior Club Championships
	All Ireland	Leinster champions	Laois champions
Football:	1	7	35
Hurling:	-	-	11
Ladies' football:	–	–	3

Portlaoise GAA is a Gaelic Athletic Association (GAA) affiliated hurling, Gaelic football and camogie club based in Portlaoise, the county town of Laois in Ireland. Founded in 1887, the club has won several Laois Senior Football, Laois Senior Hurling and Laois Ladies' Senior Football Club Championships. The club won the 1982-93 All-Ireland Senior Club Football Championship. The club has its grounds at Rathleague townland, to the southeast of Portlaoise town.

== History ==
=== Founding ===
Portlaoise GAA club was founded in the early years of the Gaelic Athletic Association. The inaugural meeting of the club took place in Portlaoise's town hall on Monday 28 November 1887. It was a public meeting called by placard and there was a big attendance. Amongst those present were Dr. Higgins, coroner for the Queen's County (Laois), who presided, N. Walsh, C.T.C., P.A. Meehan, T.C., C. McDermott, T.C., P. Kelly, T.C., T. Lawlor T.C., C.E. Corcoran, solicitor, Mark Walsh, J. Moore, P.J. Hegarty, R.P. Fennell, P. Fitzpatrick, M. Brophy and J.T. Delaney.

Dr Higgins said that the object was to form a branch of the GAA in the town of Maryboro (Portlaoise), an object worthy of the town's support. He said that "It is a very desirable movement" and that "Nearly every town in Ireland of the size and importance of Maryborough had formed a branch of the Association and it was certainly time for Maryborough to follow suit".

Meehan proposed the first resolution: "that a branch of the Gaelic Athletic Association be hereby established in the town and that it be called the William O'Brien Branch". Kelly seconded the motion. Higgins was proposed as president and Corcoran as vice-president. Corcoran said that "they all knew that Mr O'Brien was a friend of the oppressed tenantry in Ireland and had, or ought to have the sympathy of every Irishman". (William O'Brien was incarcerated in Tullamore Jail at the time). Kelly proposed that R.P. Fennell be secretary and that J. Moore be treasurer and Mr J. Higgins, clothier, seconded.

==== Clerical influence ====
Early Portlaoise GAA history is dominated by two clerics. In the early decades of the 20th century, the local curate, Fr J. J. Kearney popularised hurling and football amongst the town's youth.

Fr Kearney went on to become county chairman and oversaw the purchase of a ground for the county in 1919. This field, later named O'Moore Park, was developed into a provincial stadium in the decades that followed. On the playing fields, Fr Kearney was behind the county's only All-Ireland senior hurling success in 1915.

In the 1920s, a young hurler called Matt Walsh helped the club win its first senior hurling title in 1928. He became Fr Matt Walsh and retained remained involved with the sport even though he spent most of his life on religious missions in Nigeria. On a trip home in 1960, he trained the senior hurling team that was pipped by a point by Borris-in-Ossory in the county final. Fr Walsh remained as president of the club until his death in the 1990s.

Several members of the Congregation of Christian Brothers were also involved in the promotion of Gaelic Games in the town.

=== First Leinster title ===
On 13 October 1889, Maryborough won the Leinster semi-final and final on the same day. This happened in Inchicore when the Laois representatives defeated Bray Emmets GAA and then accounted for Louth champions, Newtown Blues in the final.

The county champions in those days picked the county team. Maryborough had beaten Wolfhill in the county final and had co-opted a number of players from Wolfhill and some other clubs for their same day double-header in Inchicore. The All-Ireland final was fixed for the following Sunday and the Laois and Leinster champions were unable to muster the same line-out because of the restricted travel services of the period. They were defeated by the Tipperary champions, Bohercrowe, before a large crowd.

=== Modern era ===
The next time Portlaoise won a Leinster title was in the 1971/72 season. In the Leinster final against Athlone, Portlaoise found themselves eleven points adrift with only twenty minutes remaining. But, in a significant come-back, the Laois champions defeated their opponents to capture the provincial title. Two late points saw them beaten by Derry GAA champions, Bellaghy, by a single point in the All-Ireland semi-final on a 1–11 to 1-10 scoreline. Bellaghy went on to win the title.

==== All-Ireland success ====
Portlaoise's "greatest hour" arrived in 1983 when as county champions of 1982, they won out in Leinster, defeated St Finbarr's of Cork in the All-Ireland semi-final and won the All-Ireland final by 0–12 to 2–0 against Clann na nGael (Roscommon).

The club was also selected as "Leinster Club of the Year" on several occasions in the 1980s.

==== Men's Senior football success ====
Portlaoise, by winning its 35th county football title in 2019, moved to top of the honours list in Laois. With seven provincial crowns, the club are also on top in Leinster. The club have been runners up on 10 occasions (twice as Mayborough).

There was a 57-year gap between titles four and five, the former was won in 1907 and the latter in 1964. From 1964 on the club has won the senior football title almost every second year since then.

==== Senior hurling ====
The senior hurlers won nine titles in the quarter of a century from 1981 to add to the two earlier ones won in 1928 and 1943. The record of the hurlers is headlined by two appearances in Leinster club finals in the 1980s and 1990s and a four-in-a-row of county title wins from 1981 to 1984. John Joe Ging captained all four-in-a-row wins and all finals were won at different venues.

==== Ladies' football ====
The ladies' club was originally formed in 1985 after a meeting and approximately 50 members joined in the first year. Two teams were entered into the championship.

October 1987 saw the ladies' junior footballers win their first title against Mountrath under the guidance of Kevin Farrell. They became the first ladies team to win any title representing Portlaoise GAA Club.

In 1989, having won the title once again, beating rivals Ballypickas in the final, the ladies were promoted to senior ranks but failed to make the final stages of the championship.

The following year, having gone back to junior ranks the ladies were beaten in the semi-final of the championship but in 1991 the club won its third title defeating Crettyard 2–5 to 1–5.

The ladies' club then disbanded for a couple of years and in 1992 Frank Keenan senior club secretary approached Brendan Fitzpatrick with the view of setting the club up again.

The club again disbanded and re-emerged in 2000 as a juvenile club. Originally starting out at U-14 level, by 2002 the club was entering teams at U-12, U-14 and at U-16 levels. In 2007, Portlaoise ladies played at senior level for the first time since reforming.

They competed in their first Laois Ladies' Senior Football Club Championship final in 2016 before being beaten by Sarsfields. It was the same result when they again played Sarsfields in the 2017 and 2018 final. Portlaoise were to win their first Laois Ladies' Senior Football Club Championship title in 2020 when they defeated reigning champions Sarsfields who were going for nine-in-a-row on a scoreline of 1–12 to 0–12.

Portlaoise ladies have gone on to win two more Laois Ladies' Senior Football Club Championship finals, beating St. Conleth's 0-12 to 2-05 in the 2022 final and beating them again in the 2023 final 1-6 to 0-7.

==== Camogie ====
Portlaoise began running the camogie wing of the club in 2007 and in 2019 the club competed at the adult level for the first time when they played in the Junior ranks of the Laois Camogie Championship. They made it to the final that year where they came against Camross and lost out on a scoreline of 5–2 to 3–5. Portlaoise won their first adult level trophy defeating O'Moore's on a scoreline of 3–12 to 1–04 to win the 2020 Laois Junior Camogie Championship. This game was the delayed replay of the 2020 final played on 19 September 2021 due to the COVID-19 Pandemic. Portlaoise backed this win up with their successful defence of the trophy in 2021 defeating Camross Camogie 1–15 to 2–05 in O'Moore Park on 20 November 2021. In 2024 the Portlaoise camogie team won the Laois Junior Camogie Championship for the 3rd time beating Camross 1-15 to 2-05.

==== Youth system ====
The club's youth development system has been a core part of the club since its reformation in 1949. In 1953, the club merged with two other local teams, The Rovers and Kilminchy, forming a unified organisation.

The club has won several county titles and wins have also been registered in several national competitions including the Féile na nGael and Féile Peil na nÓg.

==== Chairperson ====
Among the long-serving chairpersons, since the 1950s, were Joe Bracken Sr. and Peadar Molloy. Long-serving secretaries included Jim Loughlin, Jimmy Cotter and Bill Phelan, while Dick Sides was treasurer for nearly thirty years.

As of 2025, Portlaoise have "split" the role of chairperson into a joint position shared by Eamon Fennelly and Dermot Costelloe.

== Club grounds ==
=== Páirc Uí Fhaoláin ===
It was not until the late 1970s that Portlaoise again had its own playing fields, on land adjacent to O'Moore Park on Father Brown Avenue, purchased from Laois County Board which helped fund a major development at the county grounds in the 1980s.

The club centre was named after a former club player, Paschal Delaney, while the grounds were named after one of the club's former officials, Bill Phelan. Phelan was club secretary for many years and also county chairman. The committee room was named after another long-serving secretary, Jimmy Cotter.

=== Rathleague ===
With the growth of the number of teams and training demands for girls as well as boys, the grounds next to O'Moore Park, with only two full-size pitches, was proving too cramped for a growing urban club with over twenty teams including adult, juvenile and ladies football. At a special AGM it was decided to relocate to a 38-acre site at Rathleague and this is where the club now calls home.

The club began development of Rathleague in 2009 which was completed in 2011. The pitch in Rathleague, near Bloomfield Cross, contains many pitches, juvenile and senior, including an all-weather senior pitch.

== Roll of honour ==
=== Men's football titles ===
==== Senior ====
- All-Ireland Senior Club Football Championship (1): 1982-83
- Leinster Senior Club Football Championship (7): 1971, 1976, 1982, 1985, 1987, 2004, 2009
- Laois Senior Football Championship (35): 1889, 1897, 1906, 1907, 1964, 1966, 1967, 1968, 1970, 1971, 1976, 1979, 1981, 1982, 1984, 1985, 1986, 1987, 1990, 1991, 1999, 2002, 2004, 2007, 2008, 2009, 2010, 2011, 2012, 2013, 2014, 2015, 2017, 2018, 2019

==== Intermediate ====
- Laois Intermediate Football Championship (5): 1939, 1956, 1972, 1975, 1982

==== U-21 ====
- Laois U-21 Football Championship (18): 1965, 1974, 1975, 1976, 1977, 1978, 1979, 1980, 1997, 1998, 1999, 2000, 2001, 2002, 2005, 2006, 2007, 2013

==== Junior ====
- Laois Junior A Football Championship (11): 1965, 1974, 1975, 1976, 1977, 1978, 1979, 1980, 1997, 1998, 1999, 2000, 2001, 2002, 2005, 2006, 2007, 2013;
- Laois Junior B Football Championship (2): 2002, 2010;
- Laois Junior C Football Championship (3): 2003, 2008, 2009

==== Minor ====
- Laois Minor Football Championship (27): 1940, 1941, 1951, 1954, 1956, 1961, 1962, 1963, 1972, 1973, 1974, 1976, 1978, 1979, 1981, 1984, 1993, 1995, 1998, 1999, 2002, 2003, 2007, 2008, 2011, 2012, 2024;
- Laois Minor 'A' Football League (1): 2019;

=== Hurling titles ===
==== Senior ====
- Laois Senior Hurling Championship (11): 1928, 1943, 1981, 1982, 1983, 1984, 1987, 1989, 1991, 1998, 2004
- ACHL Div 1 (3): 1986, 1995, 1996

==== Intermediate ====
- Laois Intermediate Hurling Championship (2): 1935, 1942

==== U-21 ====
- Laois U-21 Hurling Championship (5): 1978, 1981, 1988, 2000, 2015

==== Junior ====
- Laois Junior A Hurling Championship (4): 1965, 1987, 1993, 2013
- Laois Junior C Hurling Championship (1): 2018

==== Minor ====
- Laois Minor Hurling Championship (21): 1949, 1950, 1952, 1953, 1955, 1956, 1958, 1959, 1960, 1961, 1962, 1964, 1965, 1972, 1984, 1985, 1989, 1996, 1997, 1999, 2001

=== Ladies' football titles ===
==== Senior ====
- Laois Ladies' Senior Football Club Championship (3): 2020, 2022, 2023
- Laois Ladies' Senior Football Club Championship B (1): 2014

==== Intermediate ====
- Laois Minor Championship (1): 2006

==== Junior ====
- Laois Junior Championship (4): 1987, 1988, 1992, 2005

==== Minor ====
- Laois Minor Championship (3): 2007, 2008, 2017

=== Camogie titles ===
==== Junior ====
- Laois Camogie Junior 'A' Championship (3): 2020, 2021, 2024
- Laois Camogie Junior 'B' Championship (1): 1995

==== Minor ====
- Laois Camogie Minor 'B' Championship (1): 2023

== Laois Men's Senior Club Football Championships ==
Year	Winner	Score	Opponent	Score
2019	Portlaoise	0-14	Killeshin	2-07
2018	Portlaoise	2-16	O'Dempseys	1-13
2017	Portlaoise	3-13	Ballylinan	0-10
2015	Portlaoise	0–15, 2-13 (R)	Emo	2-09, 0-07 (R)
2014	Portlaoise	2-14	Arles-Killeen	0-09
2013	Portlaoise	2-08	Arles-Killeen	1-08
2012	Portlaoise	1-13	Arles-Kilcruise	0-09
2011	Portlaoise	1-12	Graiguecullen	1-06
2010	Portlaoise	1-08	Arles-Kilcruise	0-08
2009	Portlaoise	1-09	Arles-Kilcruise	0-07
2008	Portlaoise	2-14	Timahoe	1-07
2007	Portlaoise	1-14	Stradbally	0-07
2004	Portlaoise	0-15	Emo	0-06
2002	Portlaoise	2-11	St Joseph's	1-06
1999	Portlaoise	1-13	St Joseph's	1-11
1991	Portlaoise	0-07	Portarlington	0-05
1990	Portlaoise	1-09	Ballyroan	0-08
1987	Portlaoise	3-16	Ballylinan	0-05
1986	Portlaoise	2-09	Emo	1-07
1985	Portlaoise	1-06	Ballyroan	0-07
1984	Portlaoise	0-09, 2-08 (R)	Ballyroan	1-06, 1-05 (R)
1982	Portlaoise	1-13	Annanough	0-04
1981	Portlaoise	0-12	Graiguecullen	2-05
1979	Portlaoise	1-10	St Joseph's	1-09
1976	Portlaoise	0-09, 2-10 (R)	Graiguecullen	1-06, 0-10 (R)
1971	Portlaoise	1-07	The Heath	0-07
1970	Portlaoise	1-07	St Joseph's	0-09
1968	Portlaoise	1-10	Timahoe	1-05
1967	Portlaoise	4-09	Emo	1-07
1966	Portlaoise	0-07, 2-08 (R)	O'Dempsey's	0-07, 1-04 (R)
1964	Portlaoise	1-05	Graiguecullen	0-07
1907	Maryborough	??	Rathdowney	??
1906	Maryborough	0–8, 0-4 (R) (obj)	Raheenabrogue	0–8, 1-3 (R)
1897	Maryborough	w/o	Wolfhill	scr
1889	Maryborough	0-03	Wolfhill	0-02

Note: The 1889, 1897, 1906 and 1907 titles were won under the name Maryborough. In October 1920, the Town Commission passed a resolution that Maryborough be renamed Portlaoise.

=== All Ireland Men's Senior Club Football ===
Year	Winner	Score	Opponent	Score	County
1982–83	Portlaoise	0-12	Clann na nGael	2-00	Roscommon

All-Ireland Men's Senior Club Football - runners-up

Year	Winner/Opponent	Score	County	Portlaoise	Score	Referee
2004–05	Ballina Stephenites	1-12	Mayo	Portlaoise	2-08	Brian Crowe (Cavan)

=== Leinster Men's Senior Club Football ===
Year	Winner	Score	Opponent	County	Score
2009	Portlaoise	1-09	Garrycastle	Westmeath	1-05
2004	Portlaoise	1-11	Skryne	Meath	2-04
1987	Portlaoise	1-08, 1-07 (R)	Parnells	Dublin	1-08, 1-05 (R)
1985	Portlaoise	1-08, 2-08 (R)	Baltinglass	Wicklow	1-08, 1-09 (R)
1982	Portlaoise	1-08	Ballymun Kickhams	Dublin	0-07
1976	Portlaoise	1-12	Cooley Kickhams	Louth	0-08
1971	Portlaoise	2-11	Athlone	Westmeath	2-09

Leinster Men's Senior Club Football - runners-up

Year	Winner/Opponent	County	Score	Portlaoise	Score
2015	Ballyboden St Enda's	Dublin	2-09	Portlaoise	1-11
2013	St. Vincent's	Dublin	3-12	Portlaoise	3-09
2012	Ballymun Kickhams	Dublin	0-11	Portlaoise	0-08
1986	Ferbane	Offaly	3-05	Portlaoise	1-10
1981	Raheens	Kildare	1-07	Portlaoise	0-06
1979	Walsh Island	Offaly	3-02	Portlaoise	1-06

== Senior hurling ==
Year	Winner	Score	Opponent	Score
2004	Portlaoise	2-08	Castletown	0-07
1998	Portlaoise	0-13	Harps	0-11
1991	Portlaoise	1-14	Clonad	0-07
1989	Portlaoise	1-09, 0-12 (R)	Camross	2-06, 1-04 (R)
1987	Portlaoise	2-13	Clonad	1-05
1984	Portlaoise	1-08, 2-14 (R)	Harps	2-05, 1-07 (R)
1983	Portlaoise	3-10	Camross	3-05
1982	Portlaoise	2-12	Errill	1-08
1981	Portlaoise	2-13	Camross	4-05
1943	Portlaoise	4-11	Rathdowney	4-03
1928	Portlaoise	0-04	Clonad	1-00

Leinster Senior Club Hurling Championships - runners-up

Year	Winner/Opponent	Score	County	Portlaoise	Score
1998–99	Rathnure	1-13	Wexford	Portlaoise	1-06
1987–88	Rathnure	3-08	Wexford	Portlaoise	1-13

== Laois Ladies' Senior Football Club Championship ==
Year	Winner	Score	Opponent	Score
2023	Portlaoise	1-6	St Conleth's	0-07
2022	Portlaoise	2-5	St Conleth's	0-10
2020	Portlaoise	1-12	Sarsfields	0-12

Laois Ladies' Senior Football Club Championship - runners-up

Year	Winner/Opponent	Score	Portlaoise	Score
2018	Sarsfields	0-11	Portlaoise	0-07
2017	Sarsfields	3-15	Portlaoise	0-03
2016	Sarsfields	2-11	Portlaoise	0-12

== Juvenile teams ==
Portlaoise has won the Féile na nGael (hurling) and Féile Peile na nÓg (Gaelic football) competitions several times, recording wins in Féile na nGael in 1980, 1981, 1993, 2009 and 2012 and Féile Peile na nÓg in 1983, 1992, and 2009. In 2009, Portlaoise recorded a rare double, winning Division 3, Féile Péile na nÓg in Kildare, when they defeated Limerick club, Monaleen GAA, 5-4 to 0-3 in the final in St. Conleth's Park, Newbridge and Division 2, Féile na nGael at home in Laois/Offaly, beating St Patrick's, Portaferry GAA from Down, 4-6 to 1-4.

=== Féile na nÓg Winning Years ===
Year	Winner	Score	Opponent	County	Score
2012	Portlaoise	3-07	St Johns Belfast	Antrim	2-08
2009	Portlaoise	4-06	Portaferry	Down	1-04
1993	Portlaoise	3-05	Sarsfields	Galway	0-2
1981	Portlaoise	5-04	Lismore	Waterford	2-00
1980	Portlaoise	5-04	Dungarvan	Donegal	2-00

=== Féile Peile na nGael Winning Years ===
Year	Winner	Score	Opponent	County	Score
2009	Portlaoise	5-04	Monaleen	Limerick	0-03
1992	Portlaoise	2-08	Four Masters	Donegal	0-1
1983	Portlaoise	0-04	Monaghan Harps	Monaghan	0-02

== Player awards ==
=== All-Stars ===
All-Stars were awarded to two Portlaise club members in the 1980s. Pat Critchley received a hurling All-Star in 1985 and Colm Browne received a football All-Star in 1986.

Pat Critchley's selection on the 1985 All-Star hurling team made him the first (and only) from the county to achieve that honour. The Portlaoise clubman was selected at midfield alongside Nicky English and Joe Cooney. In the summer of 1985, Critchley played one of his best ever games against Wexford in the Leinster championship and Laois reached the provincial final for the first time in 36 years.

Colm Browne, a Templemore-based member of An Garda Siochána, was born in London. Playing at wing back, he made the breakthrough (alongside his brother Gerry) on to a Portlaoise club team in the mid 1970s. He was captain in Laois's National Football League victory in 1986 and was rewarded with an All-Star award later that year. Three years earlier, he had been player-manager when Portlaoise won the All-Ireland Club Football Championship title. He subsequently took over the reins from Richie Connor as Laois manager in 1994.

=== Laois Teams of the Millennium ===
Four Portlaoise footballers were selected on the Laois Football Team of the Millennium for the year 2000. Paddy Bracken was in goal, Colm Browne at right half back, Eamon "Atch" Whelan, at full-forward and Tom Prendergast at left full-forward.

Two Portlaoise players were also selected to the Laois Hurling Team of the Millennium, with John Taylor at left half back, and Pat Critchley at midfield.

== Notable players ==
- Colm Browne
- Pat Critchley
- Sean Delaney
- Gareth Dillon
- Ian Fitzgerald
- Karl Lenihan
- Mick Lillis
- Peter McNulty
- Colm Parkinson
- Tom Prendergast
- John Taylor
- Zach Tuohy
