= Colm Parkinson =

Irish Gaelic footballer and journalist

Personal information
- Born: 1978 (age 47–48) Portlaoise, Laois
- Height: 6 ft 0 in (183 cm)

Sport
- Sport: Gaelic Football
Clubs
- Years: Club
- 2009-2010: Portlaoise; Parnells GAA
Club titles
- Laois titles: 6
- Leinster titles: 1
Inter-county
- Years: County
- 1998–2008 2011–: Laois; Laois
Inter-county titles
- Leinster titles: 1
- All-Irelands: 0
- All Stars: 0

Colm "Wooly" Parkinson (born 1978 in Meelick, Portlaoise) is a retired Irish Gaelic footballer, and journalist.

== Playing career ==
=== Club ===
Parkinson was a decorated underage player with Portlaoise, winning county titles at every underage grade before graduating to the senior team in 1997. In his first year at senior level, Portlaoise reached the county final losing to Stradbally. He would win his first title 2 years later in 1999, scoring 0–03 in a narrow win against St Josephs. It was Portlaoise's first county title since 1991. He starred again for Portlaoise in the 2001 final, scoring 1–02 as Portlaoise beat a fancied St. Josephs side.

He captained Portlaoise to his third title in 2004, also winning man of the match in the final against Emo. Portlaoise went on to win the Leinster Club title that year beating Skryne in the decider. Portlaoise would go on to beat Crossmaglen in the All Ireland semi final but lost by a point in the All Ireland final against Ballina. Parkinson caused controversy in Portlaoise when he decided to travel to south-east Asia for 7 weeks after the Leinster win. The same year, he earned the Leinster club player of the year and the Laois player of the year for his performances for Portlaoise.

He won two more titles for Portlaoise – winning man of the match in the final again in 2007 against Stradbally and beating Timahoe in 2008 before surprising everyone by transferring to the Parnells club in Dublin in 2009.

He played for Parnells for two seasons, winning a Division 2 league title.

He returned to Portlaoise again in 2011, winning his sixth and final county title against Graiguecullen.

=== Inter-county ===
Parkinson started his minor inter-county career with Laois in 1995, losing to Westmeath after two replays in the Leinster final. His position was right corner back with the team. In 2016, Laois claimed Leinster and All Ireland minor titles.

He played 3 years with the U21s winning a Leinster title in 1998. Laois went on to beat a fancied Galway team in the semi-final before losing to Kerry in the All Ireland final.

The same year, he made his Laois senior debut against Westmeath scoring 2 points from wing back. To round off a successful year in 1998, he was selected for the international rules squad.

In 1999, he won a Sigerson cup with Tralee IT but missed out on the final because of a hamstring injury.

Despite an excellent start to his career at intercounty level, Parkinson would go on to have a chequered career at senior level. Between travelling, injuries, and falling out with managers there was never a lot of consistency or continuity in his career. His final act as a senior player was to leave the Laois panel in 2011 under Justin McNulty.

== Honours ==
Inter-county

- 1 Leinster Under-21 Football Championship 1998
- 1 Leinster Minor Football Championship 1996
- 1 All-Ireland Minor Football Championship 1996
- 1 Leinster Senior Football Championship 2003

Club

- 6 Laois Senior Football Championship 1999 2002 2004 2007 2008 2011
- 5 Laois All-County Football League 1996 2004 2007 2008 2011
- 1 Leinster Senior Club Football Championship 2004

College

- 1 Sigerson Cup 1999 Tralee IT

International rules

- 1 International rules football 1998

Individual

- Leinster club player of the year 2004
- Laois player of the year 2004
