= Peter McNulty (Gaelic footballer) =

Irish Gaelic footballer

Personal information
- Nicknames: Chief, Chicken
- Born: 1985 Portlaoise, Republic of Ireland
- Died: 2010
- Height: 5 ft 9 in (175 cm)

Sport
- Sport: Gaelic football
- Position: Forward
Club
- Years: Club
- 2003–: Portlaoise
Inter-county
- Years: County
- ?- ?: Laois

Peter McNulty (1985-2010) was a Gaelic footballer from County Laois.

He played in attack and in 2003 was part of the Laois team that won the All-Ireland Minor Football Championship title for the first time since 1997.

He subsequently represented his county at the U21 and senior levels. Prior to his sudden, unexpected death in 2010, he was anticipated to figure prominently in the coming season plans of the recently hired Laois team manager Justin McNulty.

== Honours ==
- 4 Laois Senior Football Championship 2004 2007 2008 2009
- 4 Laois All-County Football League 2004 2007 2008 2009
- 2 Leinster Senior Club Football Championship 2004 2009
- 1 Leinster Under-21 Football Championship 2006
- 2 Laois Under-21 Football Championship 2005 2006
- 2 Laois Minor Football Championship 2002 2003
