= Wolfhill =

Coordinates: 56.485091°N 3.373714°W

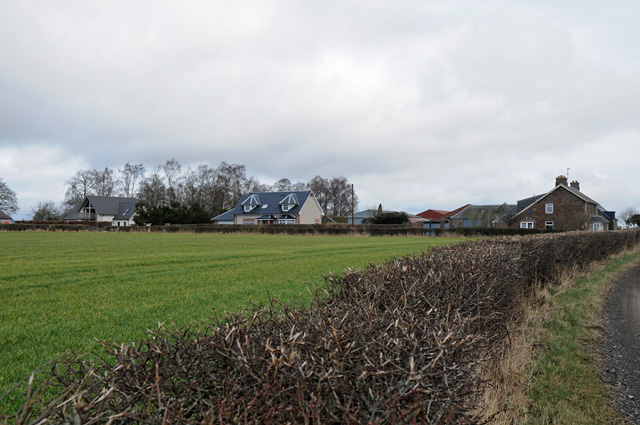

- Location within Perth and Kinross
- Population: 316
- OS grid reference: NO155334
- Council area: Perth and Kinross
- Country: Scotland
- Sovereign state: United Kingdom
- Post town: Perth
- Postcode district: PH2
- Police: Scotland
- Fire: Scottish
- Ambulance: Scottish

Wolfhill is a village in Perthshire, Scotland, with a population of 316 (2001 census). Founded in the 1820s on Ancaster Estates, it is joined to the smaller settlement formerly known as 'Carolina' and now as 'Caroline Place' founded on the adjacent Guildry Incorporation of Perth's estates.

The hamlet is near the source of the Burrelton Burn and lies between the Sidlaw Hills and the River Tay, 2 miles (3 km) north east of Guildtown and 7 miles (11 km) north-east of Perth.

Close to Wolfhill are examples of pre-historic standing stones. One of the best-known sites in folklore is "The Witches' Stane" located between Wolfhill and St Martins. According to local legend, this was the stone to which Macbeth's witches were chained, and it does indeed bear chain marks. "MacBeth's Castle" (a hill fort) can be found at the nearby village of Collace, near the Council Quarry on the Sidlaws.

There are varying stories on how the village got its name, one being that the "Wolf of Badenoch" (Alexander Stewart, Earl of Buchan) camped there before going to Perth in the 14th century to be officially forgiven by the church for his evil ways. He is buried at Dunkeld Cathedral in a cask.

The monks of nearby Coupar Angus Abbey, who formerly owned the land, stipulated in certain mid-16th-century lease agreements recorded in the document known today as the Rent Book of Coupar-Angus Abbey (Rogers 1880; pages 251, 262) that tenants were required to "... sustene and nwrice ane leche of hundis for tod and wolf.." – that is to say, "...sustain and nourish a leash of hounds for (hunting) fox and wolf..".

The former Wolfhill Manse, built in 1852, stands around 2 miles (3.2 km) south of the village. It was built for the rector of Cargill Free Church (1843), which now stands ruinous.

Birthplace of James Croll, FRS, joiner, janitor, librarian and arguably first world climatologist.
