= Portlaoise =

Town in County Laois, Ireland

Portlaoise Port Laoise (Irish) Maryborough
- Town
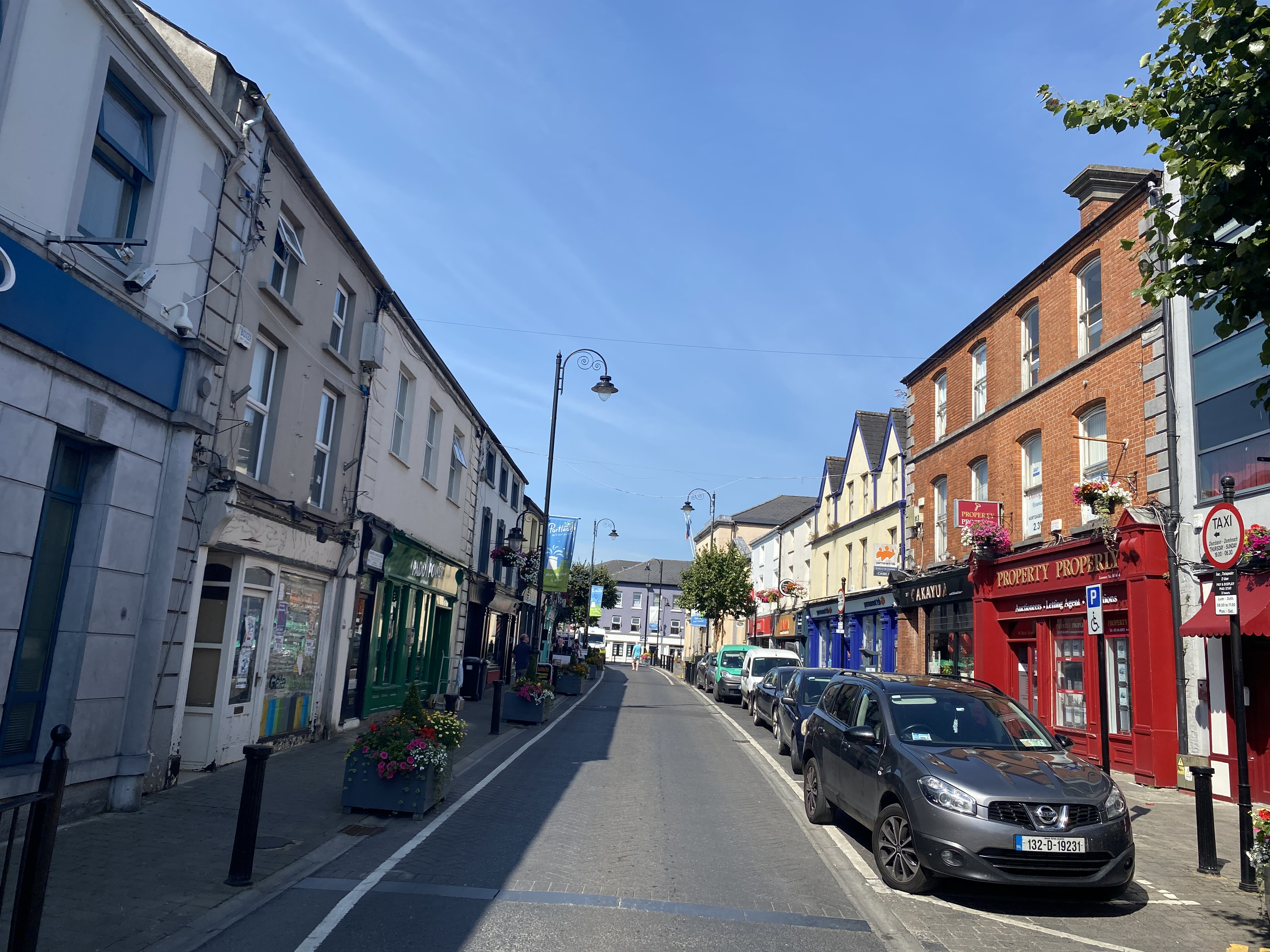
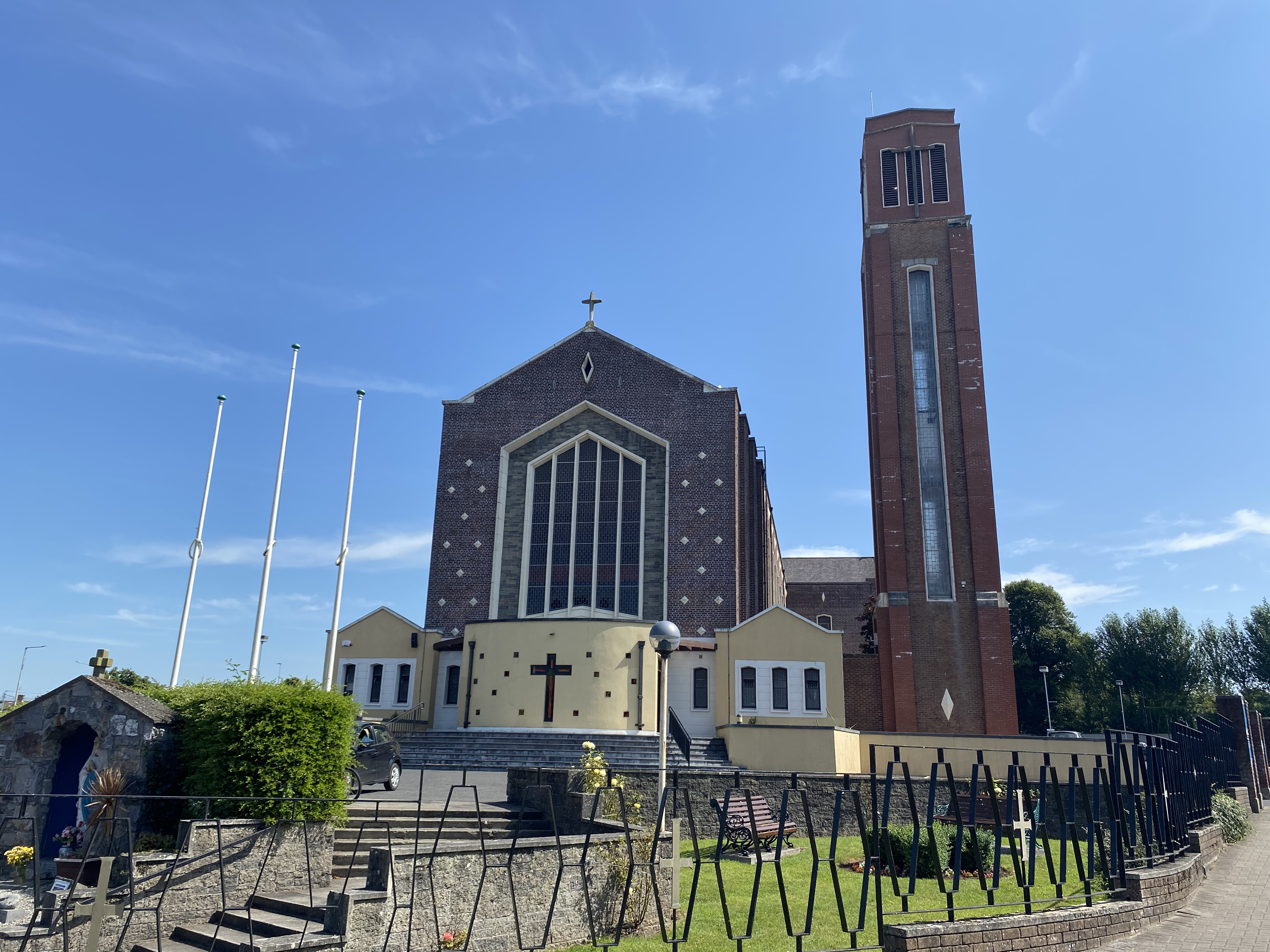
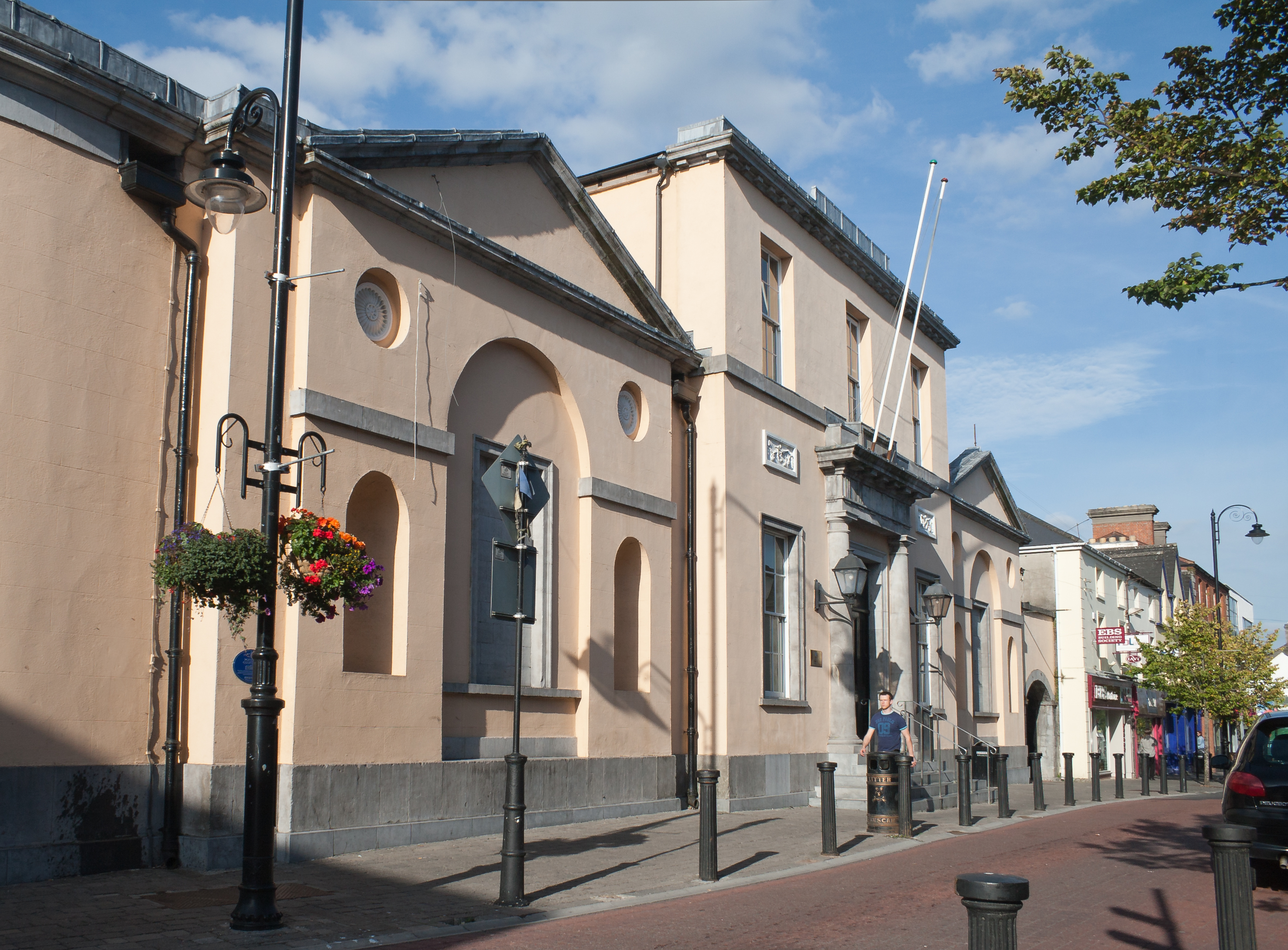
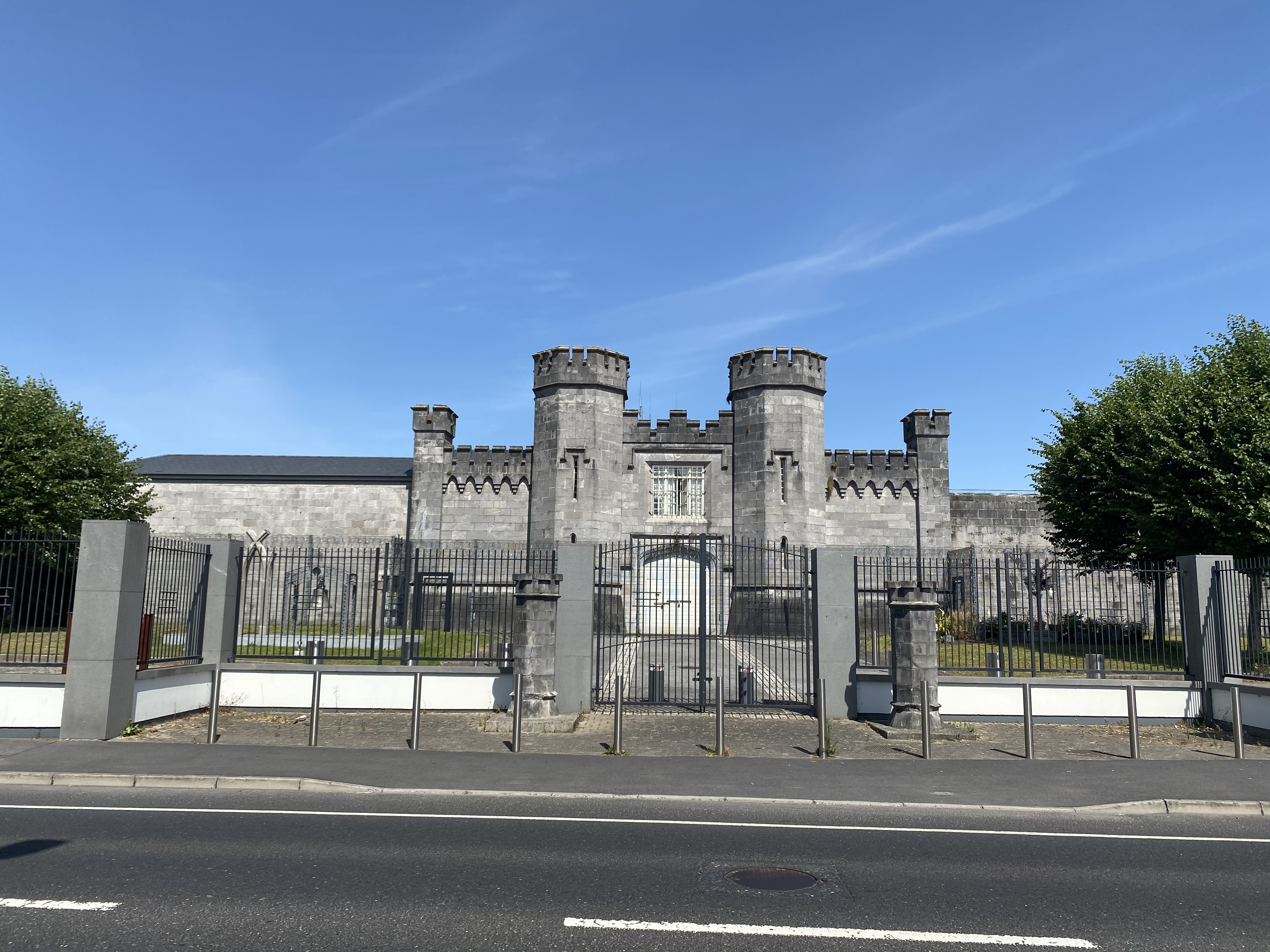
- Main Street St. Peter & Paul's Church Portlaoise Courthouse Portlaoise Prison

- Coat of arms

- Location within Ireland Location within Europe
- Coordinates: 53°1′51″N 7°18′3″W
- Country: Ireland
- Province: Leinster
- County: Laois
- Founded: 1557 (as Maryborough)
- Town Charter: 1570

Government
  - Local authority: Laois County Council
  - Local electoral area: Portlaoise
  - Dáil constituency: Laois
  - EP constituency: Midlands–North-West

Area
  - Total: 12.1 km^{2} (4.7 sq mi)
- Elevation: 139 m (456 ft)

Population (2022)
  - Total: 23,494
  - Rank: 18th (1st in Midland)
  - Density: 1,941.7/km^{2} (5,029/sq mi)
  - Ethnic or cultural background: List: White Irish (59.38%); White Other (17.67%); Black or Black Irish (4.59%); Asian or Asian Irish (5.42%); Other (3.63%); White Irish Traveller (1.22%); Not Stated (8.07%)
- Time zone: UTC±0 (WET)
  - Summer (DST): UTC+1 (IST)
- Eircode: R32
- Area codes: 057

Portlaoise (/pɔːrtˈliːʃ/ port-LEESH, Irish: Port Laoise), known until 1929 as Maryborough, is the county town of County Laois, Ireland. It is in the South Midlands in the province of Leinster.

Portlaoise was the fastest growing of the top 20 largest towns and cities in Ireland from 2011 to 2016. However, the 2022 census shows that the town's population increased by 6.6% to 23,494, which was below the national average of 8%. It is the most populous and also the most densely populated town in the Midland Region, which has a total population of 317,999 at the 2022 census.

It was an important town in the sixteenth century, as the site of the Fort of Maryborough, a fort built by English settlers during the Plantation of Queen's County.

Portlaoise is fringed by the Slieve Bloom mountains to the west and north-west and the Great Heath of Maryborough to the east. It is notable for its architecture, engineering and transport connections. On the national road network, Portlaoise is located 94 km (58 mi) west-southwest from Dublin on the M7 motorway, 170 km (106 mi) north-east from Cork on the M8 and M7, and 114 km (71 mi) east-northeast from Limerick on the M7.

It was once known for the manufacture of iron and steel buildings, tennis balls, rubber seals, tyres, electrical cabling, and Ireland's first aircraft. Today, Portlaoise is a commercial centre with the economy dominated by the service sector, and a hub of shopping, transport, and events for the surrounding catchment.

== History ==
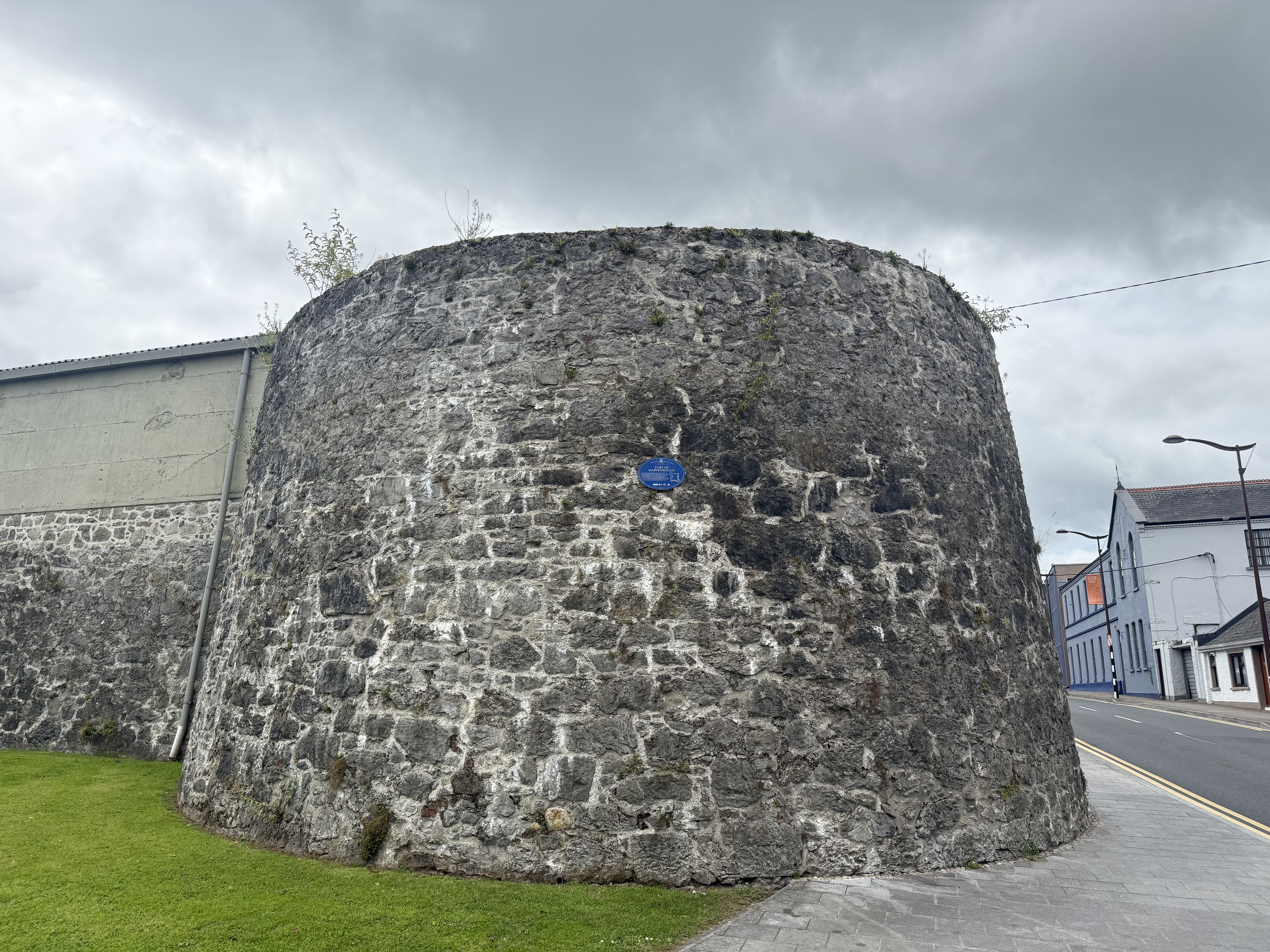
Fort of Maryborough

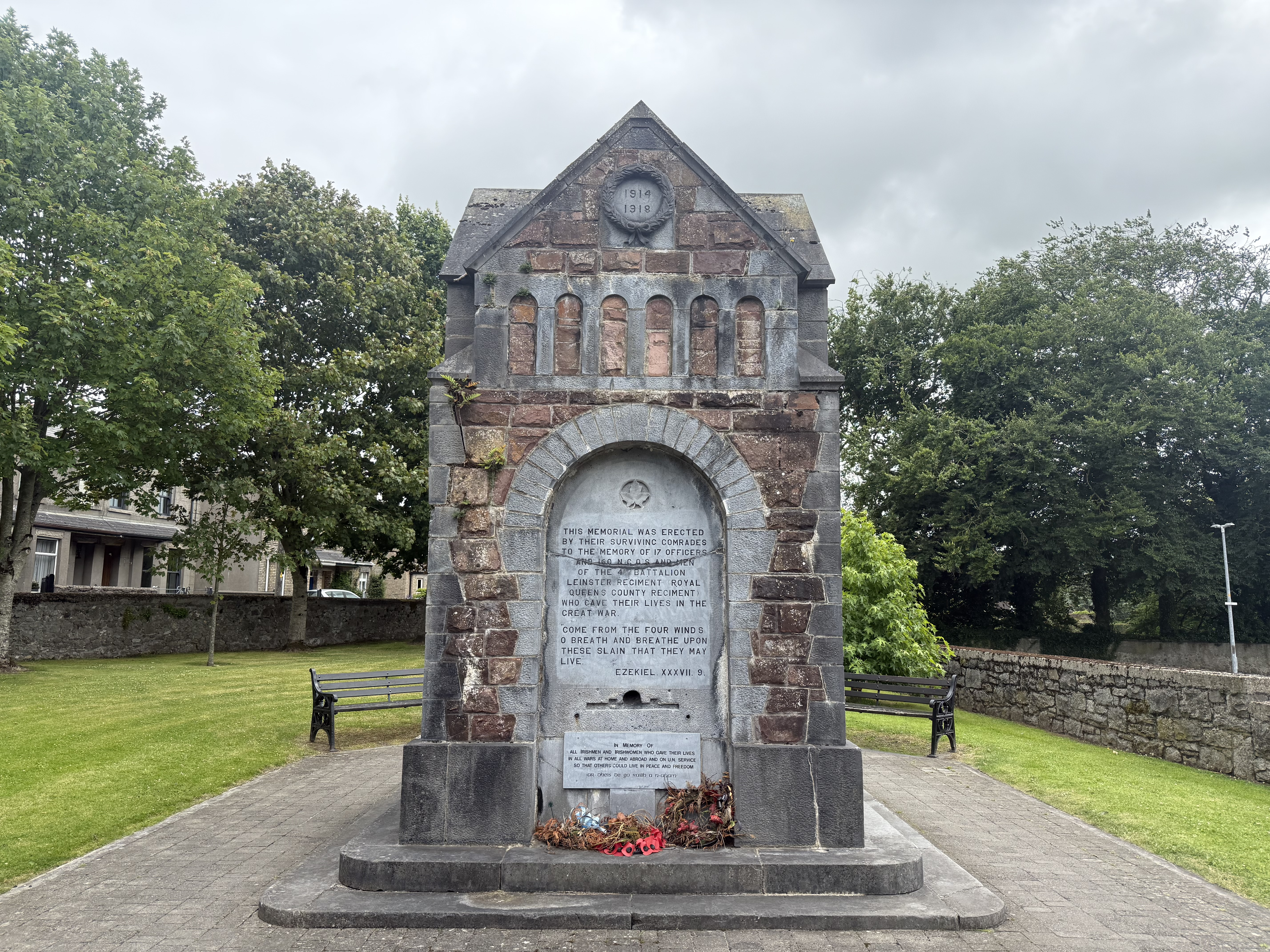
World War 1 memorial monument

The site of the present town is referred to in the Annals of the Four Masters, written in the 1630s, as Port Laoighisi. The present town originated as a settlement around the old Fort, "Fort of Leix" or "Fort Protector", the remains of which can still be seen in the town centre. Its construction began in 1548 under the supervision of the Lord Deputy, Sir Edward Bellingham, in an attempt to secure English control of the county following the exile of Celtic chieftains the previous year. The Fort's location on rising ground, surrounded to the south and east by the natural defensive barricades of the River Triogue and an esker known locally as 'the Ridge', greatly added to its strategic importance.

An Act of Parliament established the town proper during the reign of Mary I in 1557. Though the early Fort and its surrounding settlement had been known by a number of names, such as Governor, Port Laois, Campa and Fort Protector, the new town was named Maryborough (IPA [ˈmarbrə]) and the county was named Queen's County in Mary's honour. In about 1556, Portlaoise acquired its first parish church—Old St Peter's—situated to the west of Fort Protector. Although first built as a Catholic church, due to Mary's re-establishment of Catholicism, the church was used for Protestant services after the accession to the English throne of Mary's half-sister, Elizabeth.

The area had been a focus of the rebellion of Ruairí Óg Ó Mórdha, a local chieftain who had rebelled and had lost his lands, which the Crown wanted to be settled by reliable landowners. For the next fifty or so years, the new English settlers in Maryborough fought a continual, low-scale war against the Gaelic chieftains who opposed the new settlement. The town had been burnt several times by the end of the 16th century.

Ordnance Survey Map, 1839, showing Maryborough

Maryborough was granted a market in 1567, and then in 1570, a charter of Queen Elizabeth I raised the town to the rank of borough. This allowed the establishment of a Corporation of the Borough, a body consisting of a burgomaster, two bailiffs, a town clerk, and a sergeant-at-arms, as well as various other officers, burgesses, and freemen. The Maryborough Division was represented by two members in the Irish Parliament until 1800. The Act of Union ended this franchise, and it became part of the electorate of Queen's County until 1922. The town's Corporation itself existed until 1830.

In 1803–04, a new Church of Ireland church was built to replace the Old St Peter's; it was the first building to be erected on the new Market Square. The building is attributed to architect James Gandon. Other notable buildings constructed in Maryborough in the 19th century included the Court House on Main Street, built in 1805; the County Gaol, built in 1830 to a design by William Deane Butler; and the neo-classical St. Fintan's Hospital, built in 1833 on the Dublin Road.

In 1929, a few years after the foundation of the Irish Free State, the town was renamed Portlaoighise (later simplified to Port Laoise), and the county was renamed County Laois.

== Local government ==
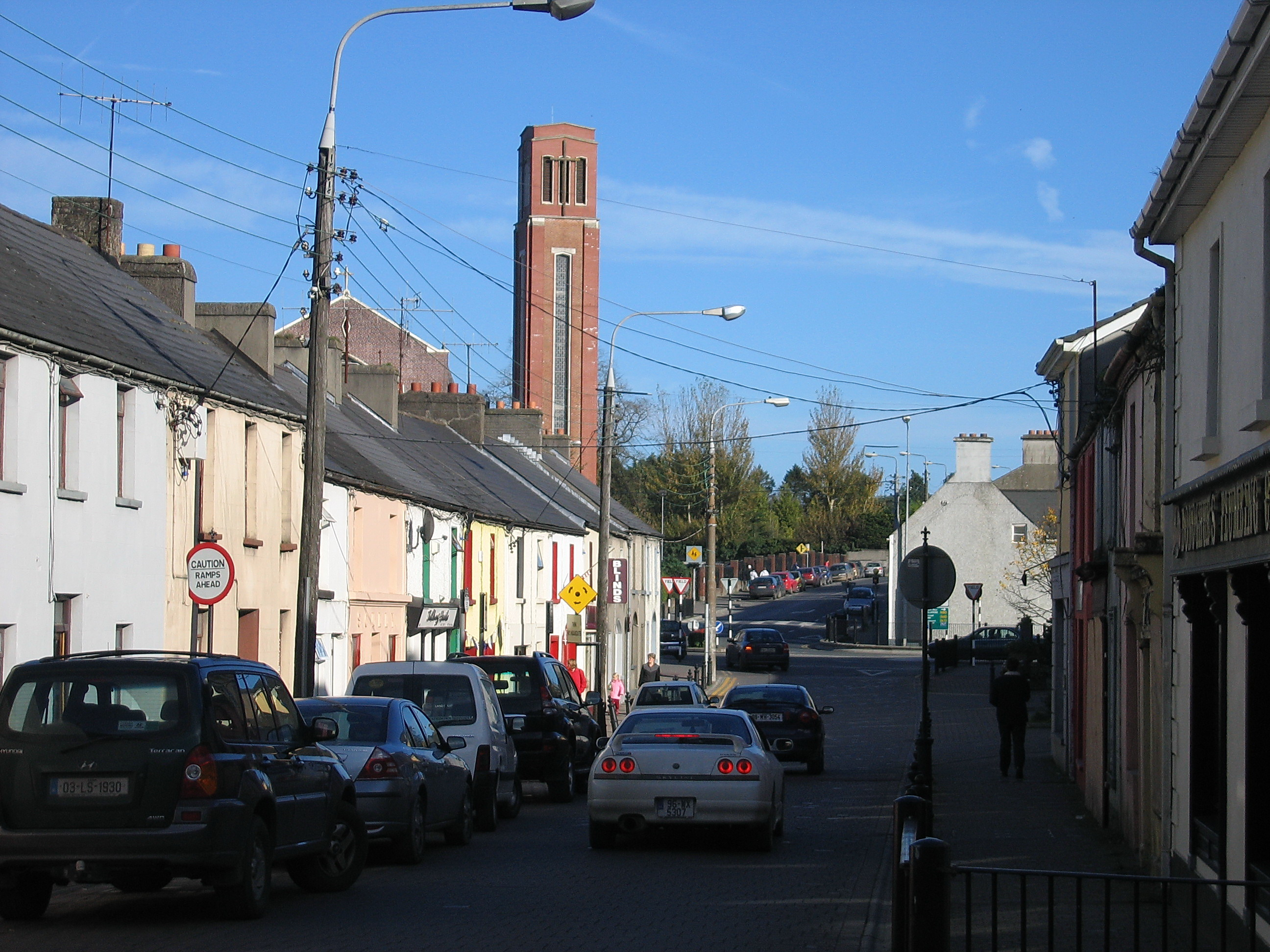
Bridge Street and Church of Sts. Peter and Paul

The town forms part of the Portlaoise local electoral area and municipal district for elections to Laois County Council. This includes the urban Portlaoise area, Abbeyleix, Ballinakill and the surrounding rural areas. As of 2020, the total population of the Portlaoise local electoral area is 31,794 people. Portlaoise Town Council was abolished in 2014 in accordance with the Local Government Reform Act 2014. Portlaoise Town Hall on Market Square, which was designed in the French Renaissance-style, was badly damaged in a fire in March 1945 and subsequently demolished.

Portlaoise is twinned with Coulounieix-Chamiers, in the Dordogne department in Nouvelle-Aquitaine, France.

== Demography ==
Historical population
Year	Pop.	±%
1821	2,677	—
1831	3,223	+20.4%
1841	3,633	+12.7%
1851	2,078	−42.8%
1861	2,935	+41.2%
1871	2,731	−7.0%
1881	2,872	+5.2%
1891	2,809	−2.2%
1901	2,957	+5.3%
1911	3,270	+10.6%
1926	3,374	+3.2%
1936	3,396	+0.7%
1946	3,170	−6.7%
1951	3,304	+4.2%
1956	5,561	+68.3%
1961	5,598	+0.7%
1966	5,873	+4.9%
1971	6,470	+10.2%
1981	7,756	+19.9%
1986	8,384	+8.1%
1991	8,360	−0.3%
1996	9,474	+13.3%
2002	12,127	+28.0%
2006	14,613	+20.5%
2011	20,145	+37.9%
2016	22,050	+9.5%
2022	23,494	+6.5%

Portlaoise was among Ireland's fastest growing towns from 2006 to 2011, with a 37.9% increase in population. In the 2016 census, it was again among the top 10 fastest-growing regions, with the population of the town and its suburbs exceeding 22,000. By the 2022 census, population reached 23,494.

In 2022, non-Irish nationals accounted for 28.47% of the population, compared with a national average figure of 20%. Polish (6.29%) were the largest single group, with the largest categories being Other European Union (7.88%) and Rest of the World (9.79%). The former Mayor, Rotimi Adebari, was the first person of African descent to become a mayor in Ireland.

Due to rapid population growth and its location in the commuter belt, Portlaoise has seen the development of additional services, including a new fire station and a large swimming leisure complex. Portlaoise has a high percentage of people under the age of 15, reflected in the recent construction of new secondary and primary schools.

== Climate ==
Portlaoise has an oceanic climate (Köppen: Cfb).

Climate data for Port Laoise
Month	Jan	Feb	Mar	Apr	May	Jun	Jul	Aug	Sep	Oct	Nov	Dec	Year
Mean daily maximum °C (°F)	7.7 (45.9)	8.3 (46.9)	9.8 (49.6)	12.1 (53.8)	15.0 (59.0)	17.5 (63.5)	18.7 (65.7)	18.4 (65.1)	16.6 (61.9)	13.4 (56.1)	9.9 (49.8)	8.1 (46.6)	13.0 (55.3)
Daily mean °C (°F)	5.4 (41.7)	5.6 (42.1)	6.6 (43.9)	8.5 (47.3)	11.4 (52.5)	14.0 (57.2)	15.4 (59.7)	15.1 (59.2)	13.4 (56.1)	10.6 (51.1)	7.5 (45.5)	5.8 (42.4)	9.9 (49.9)
Mean daily minimum °C (°F)	2.9 (37.2)	3.0 (37.4)	3.4 (38.1)	4.9 (40.8)	7.6 (45.7)	10.4 (50.7)	12.1 (53.8)	11.9 (53.4)	10.2 (50.4)	7.7 (45.9)	4.9 (40.8)	3.4 (38.1)	6.9 (44.4)
Average precipitation mm (inches)	68.9 (2.71)	65.4 (2.57)	64.9 (2.56)	62.3 (2.45)	71.7 (2.82)	72.6 (2.86)	75.6 (2.98)	79.7 (3.14)	66.0 (2.60)	89.5 (3.52)	82.9 (3.26)	81.2 (3.20)	880.7 (34.67)
Source: Weather.Directory

== Economy ==
Portlaoise has long been a major commercial and retail hub for the Midlands. Until the mid-20th century, the town's main industries were flour milling and the manufacture of worsted fabric. Since their respective declines, among the largest employers are state-owned bodies such as the maximum-security Portlaoise Prison, the Midlands Prison, the Department of Agriculture and the Midland Regional Hospital, Portlaoise. State-owned companies Córas Iompair Éireann (railways, with a National Traincare Maintenance Depot in Portlaoise), the ESB (utilities, with a training centre in the town) and also An Post are all major employers. In 2013 MyPay, a new central payroll system for 55,000 local authority employees across Ireland, was set up in Portlaoise.

Due to its location and transport connections, the National Spatial Strategy chose Portlaoise as the location for Ireland's first "Inland Port". This designation encourages the town to focus on the growth of distribution, logistics and warehouse uses. An Post operates the second largest mail centre in Ireland (after Dublin) at their depot in Portlaoise.

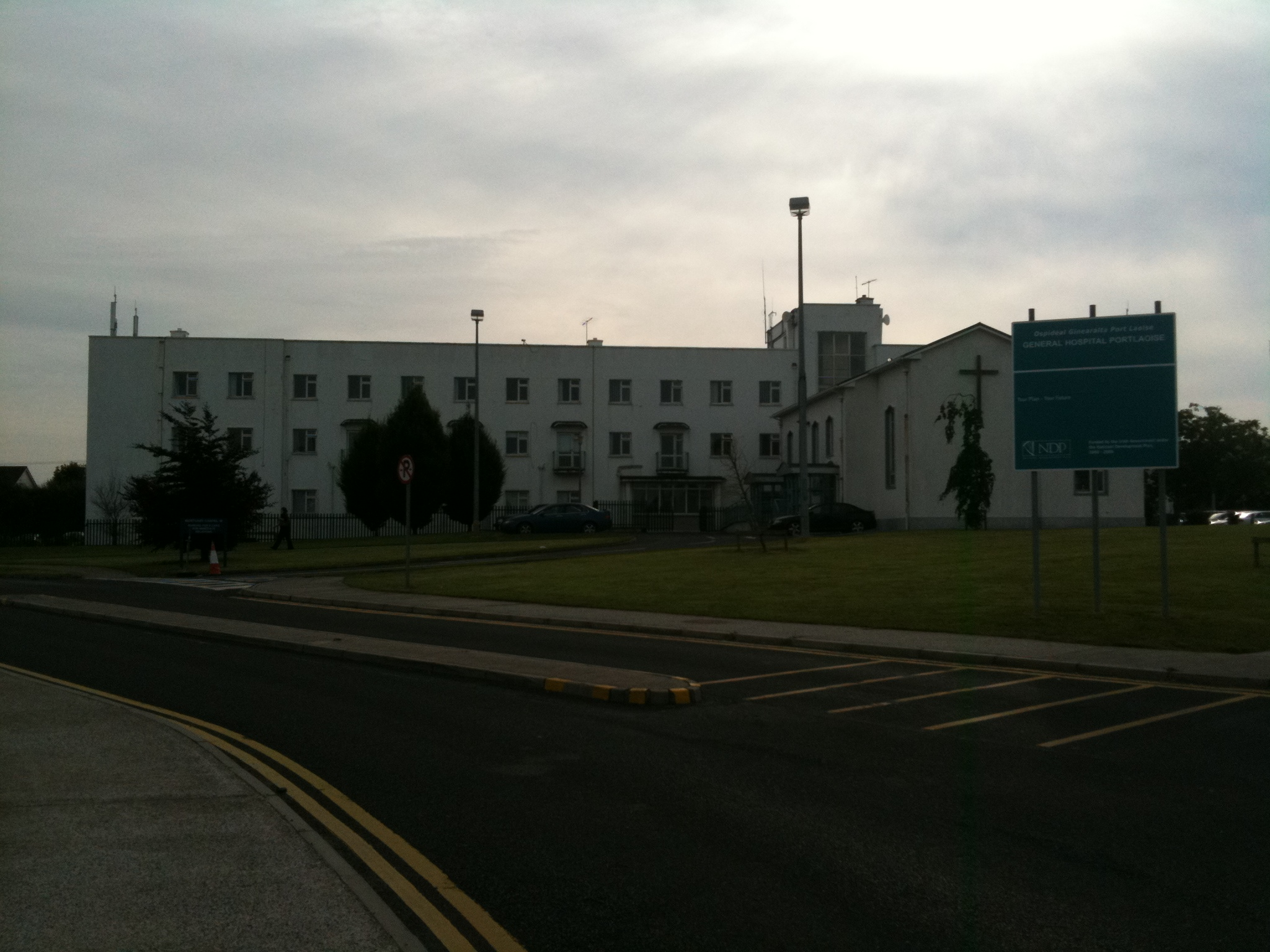
Midland Regional Hospital

=== Retail ===
Retail spaces include Laois Shopping Centre which is anchored by Tesco and Penneys, the Kyle Centre which is anchored by Dunnes Stores, Parkside Shopping Centre which is anchored by Super Valu, the Kylekiproe road retail area which houses Lidl, Supermac's and Shaws Department Stores as well a business and retail park at Kea Lew.

=== Tourism ===
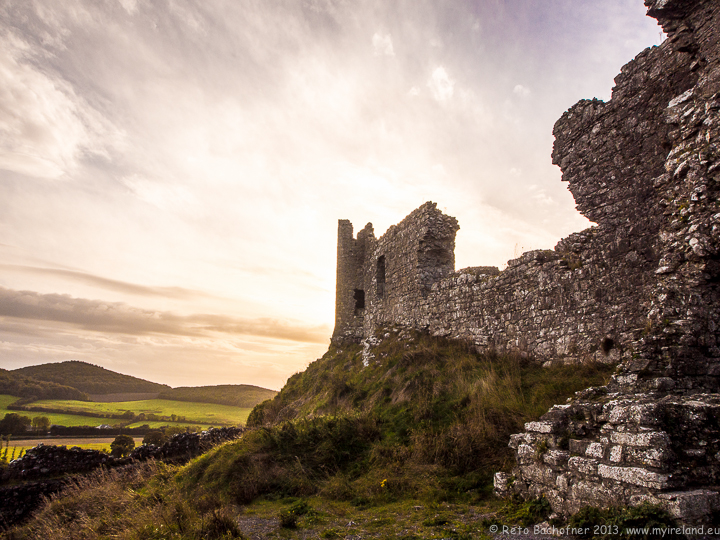
Rock of Dunamase

Tourist sites near the area include the Rock of Dunamase (6 km to the east), a hilltop castle dating from the 12th century. There is also a 12th-century round tower 12 km away in Timahoe.

Also close by is Fort Protector, a 16th-century fort built to protect British colonists from Irish natives.

Emo Court is a large Georgian estate designed by James Gandon at nearby Emo.

== Transport ==
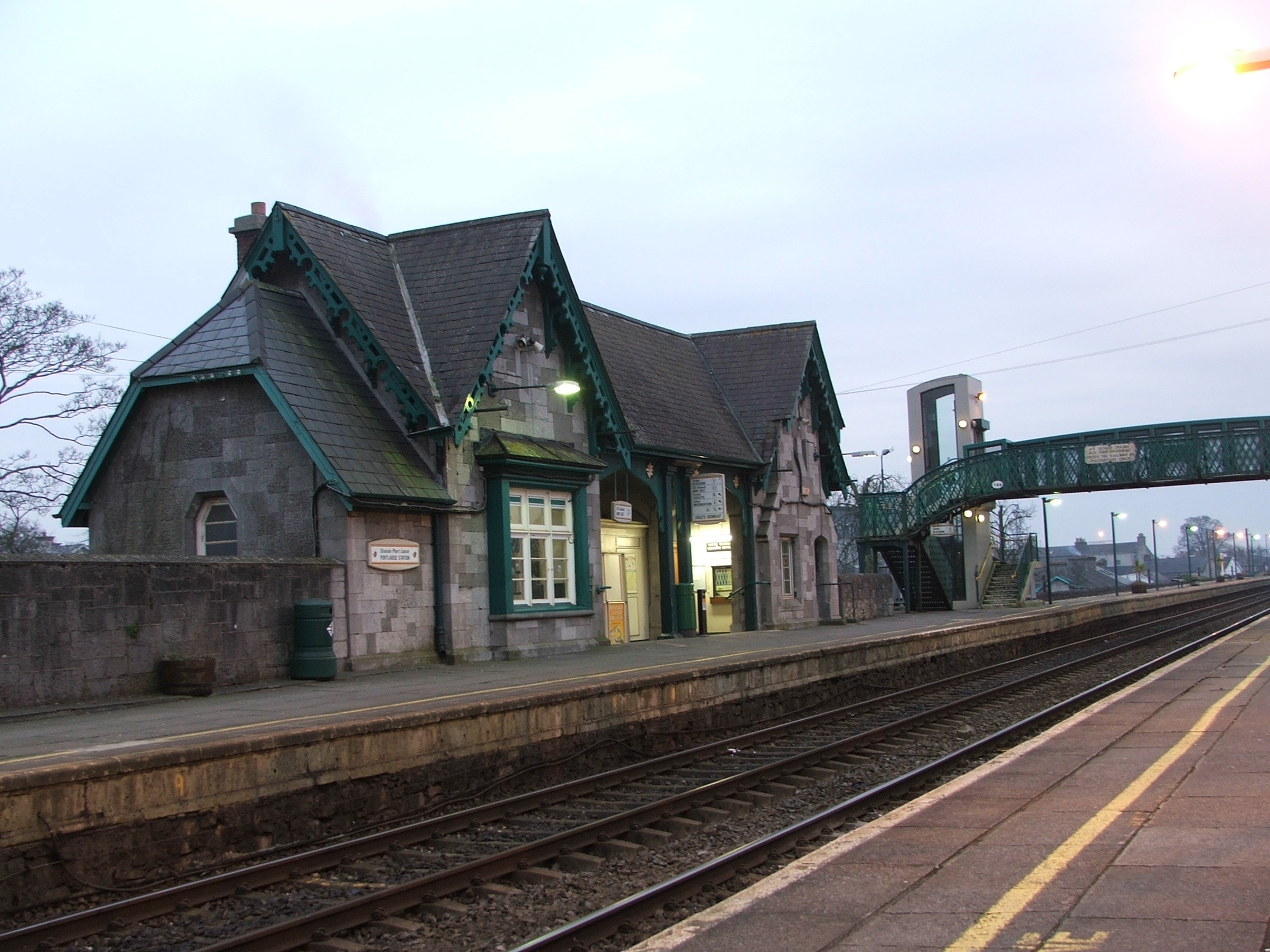
Portlaoise railway station

Portlaoise stands at a major crossroads in the Irish roads network (major roads to Dublin, Limerick, Cork) although construction in the 1990s of the M7 motorway, which bypasses the town, has reduced traffic congestion in the town centre.

Portlaoise railway station is one of the busiest railway stations outside of Dublin, and is served by intercity trains between Dublin and Cork and by Dublin commuter services. Maryborough railway station opened on 26 June 1847. It is the terminus of the Portlaoise Commuter Service, which stops at all stations to Heuston and runs hourly off peak and every 20/30 minutes during peak times. It is the busiest county town railway station in the Midland Region, with up to 32 trains to Dublin (10 non-stop) and 30 trains from Dublin (9 non-stop) per day. Córas Iompair Éireann opened a rail depot south-west of Portlaoise town centre in March 2008, with a maintenance and servicing facility for the 183 new intercity railcars and some facilities for outer suburban railcars serving the Kildare route.

Bus Éireann previously operated intercity services between Dublin and Cork/Limerick, which called at Portlaoise, though these were suspended indefinitely in 2013 and 2021. In 2025, the National Transport Authority (Ireland) launched a town bus service for Portlaoise, operated by City Direct, that runs every half hour and consists of two routes: the PL1 bus goes from Woodgrove to Colliers Lane, and the PL2 bus goes from Bellingham to Kilminchy.

The Stradbally Steam Museum in nearby Stradbally is dedicated to steam engines. It is home to a large collection of steam engines, including the Mann Steam Cart and Fowler. The museum shows the transport of the past in Portlaoise and Ireland. The Steam Preservation Society have a 1 km train track on the grounds of Stradbally Hall, which offers trips for train enthusiasts.

== Aviation History ==
Portlaoise is the birthplace of aviation in Ireland. The first aeroplane made in Ireland was assembled in the town by Frank & Louis Aldritt, William Rogers & John Conroy, and made its first flight as reported in the King's County Chronicle on 4 November 1909. Put in storage during the World War I, it remained in storage until it was discovered over 50 years later in an English museum by Joe Rogers, son of William Rogers, one of the original builders of the aircraft. It was eventually brought back to Portlaoise, where it has been restored.

== Culture and community ==
=== Nightlife ===
Portlaoise's central location within Ireland and its concentration of restaurants, pubs, bars and nightclubs around Market Square, Main Street and the Church Street area of the town centre and other nearby facilities such as paintball, golf, bowling and other amenities make it a popular destination for hen and stag parties and other weekend breaks. Portlaoise railway station is the closest station to Stradbally Hall where the Electric Picnic Festival is held each year.

=== Arts and festivals ===
Every year, the town hosts the Old Fort Quarter Festival in June, the Halloween Howls Comedy Festival on the October bank holiday weekend and the Leaves Literary Festival in November.

The Dunamaise Arts Centre, which comprises a cinema, performance space, and exhibition space, is located in the building that formerly housed the Maryborough Gaol. The opening of the Arts Centre in 1999 coincided with the revival of the Laois Drama Group.

The "Old Fort Festival", which was moved from 2019 to the grounds of the old Fort itself, is an annual event but was postponed in 2020 due to the COVID-19 pandemic. The 3-day heritage festival is based in and around the walls of the Old Fort Protector, the first of its kind to be built in Ireland, constructed between 1547 and 1548 during the tenure of Bellingham, Lord Justice of Ireland, in the reign of "the boy King" Edward VI.

The Stradbally Steam Rally is an annual event held on the August bank holiday weekend in Stradbally Hall. It attracts visitors from all over Ireland and is the highlight of the year for steam enthusiasts.

The All-Ireland Scarecrow Festival is held in Durrow at the end of July each year. It has featured large scarecrows including King Kong, Pope Francis, Noah's Ark and Electric Picnic. The town is dotted with scarecrows made by local groups, children, businesses and people from neighbouring counties.

=== Charity ===
Since 2008, Portlaoise has been the Irish base of Self Help Africa, formerly Self Help Development International, a development agency engaged in implementing rural development programmes in Sub-Saharan Africa. Established at the time of the Ethiopian Famine of 1984, the organisation is the chosen charity of the Irish Farmers Association.

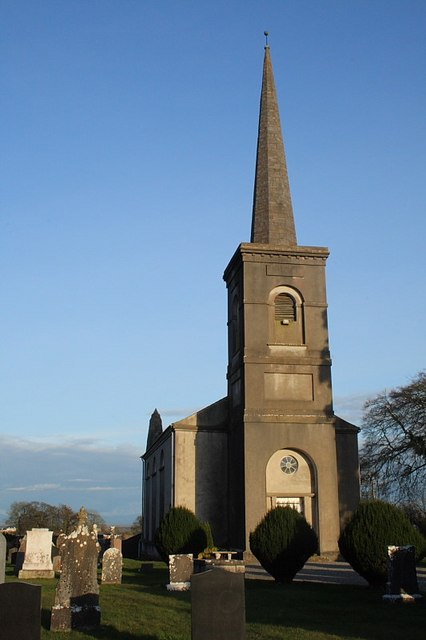
Emo Church of Ireland church to the north east of Portlaoise

== Sport ==
Portlaoise RFC, a local rugby club, is based at Togher outside the town. Portlaoise GAA is the local Gaelic Athletic Association club and the most successful GAA club in Leinster during the 2000s. Other local sports clubs include Portlaoise Association Football Club and Portlaoise Panthers Basketball Club.

Sporting facilities in the area include Portlaoise Leisure Centre (which has a swimming pool and a gym), and Portlaoise Golf Club (which has an 18-hole course on the Abbeyleix Road).

Portlaoise AFC is located on the Mountmellick Road in Rossleighan Park.

== Education ==
Portlaoise College is situated just minutes from the heart of Portlaoise. Portlaoise College provides full-time education for over 900 students in the Junior and Leaving Certificate Cycle and has the worst record in Laois for pupils going on to third level, with 46% of students continuing their education after obtaining their Leaving Certificate.

Portlaoise Institute offers further education courses, including QQI Level 5 and 6 Courses. These include courses and professional certification in beauty therapy, hairdressing, healthcare, nursing, business studies, information technology, and sports and leisure management.

== Notable people ==
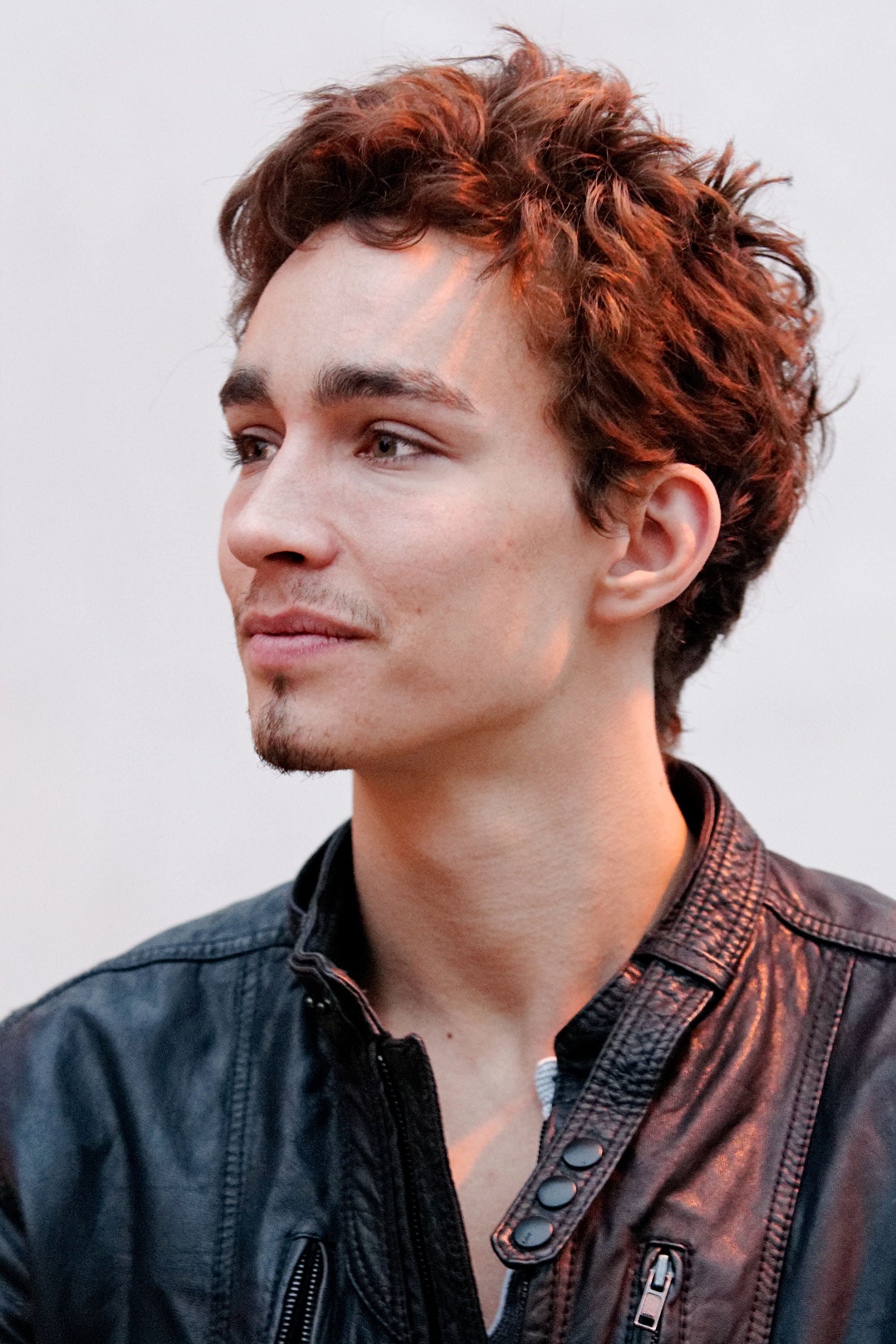
Actor Robert Sheehan, who is from Portlaoise

- Damien Bowe - singer and former member of Irish boyband D-Side.
- Pat Boran – poet and radio presenter
- Pat Critchley – GAA dual player (footballer & All Star winner at hurling)
- TJ Doheny - Professional Boxer, former IBF World Super Bantamweight Title holder.
- James Fitzmaurice – aviation pioneer
- Stephen Hunt – association football player, was born in Portlaoise in 1981
- Arthur Jacob – Professor of Anatomy (Ophthalmologist)
- Anne Keenan-Buckley (1962-) - middle-distance runner who was on the Irish 1988 Summer Olympics team.
- Pádraig Mac Lógáin – the only two-time President of Sinn Féin owned a pub on Main Street
- Eoghan Masterson – professional rugby player for Connacht
- Alison Miller – professional rugby player
- Bartholomew Mosse – founder of the Rotunda Hospital, Dublin
- Sean O'Rourke – RTÉ journalist and broadcaster
- Colm Parkinson - retired Gaelic footballer and journalist
- Brian Rigney - Irish former rugby union player who won 8 caps for Ireland between 1991–1992.
- Robert Sheehan – actor (Misfits, Love/Hate, The Umbrella Academy).
- Zach Tuohy – Australian Football League premiership player

== See also ==
- List of towns and villages in Ireland
