= 2025 Monaghan Senior Football Championship =

119th Monaghan Senior Football Championship
Tournament details
- County: Monaghan
- Year: 2025
- Trophy: Mick Duffy Cup
- Sponsor: Greenfield Foods
- Dates: 8 August - 26 October 2025
- Teams: 10
- Defending champions: Scotstown

Winners
- Champions: Scotstown (24th win)
- Manager: David McCague
- Captain: Damien McArdle
- Qualify for: Ulster Club SFC

Runners-up
- Runners-up: Inniskeen Grattans
- Manager: John McEntee
- Captain: Michael Monahan

Promotion/Relegation
- Relegated team(s): Ballybay Pearse Brothers; Aughnamullen

Other
- Website: Monaghan GAA

The 2025 Monaghan Senior Football Championship was the 119th edition of Monaghan GAA's premier Gaelic football tournament for senior clubs in County Monaghan, Ireland. Ten teams competed, with the winners representing Monaghan in the AIB GAA Ulster Senior Football Competition. The championship began with a group stage and then progressed to a knock-out stage.

Scotstown were the defending champions after defeating Clontibret O'Neills in the 2024 final, and were aiming for their third consecutive title. The 2025 competition saw Magheracloone Mitchells and Truagh Gaels return to the senior ranks.

Aughnamullen and Ballybay Pearse Brothers were both relegated to the 2026 IFC are finishing bottom in the Relegation Series. They were replaced by Carrickmacross Emmets (IFC Winners) and Castleblayney Faughs (IFL Winners).

== Team changes ==
The two bottom-placed teams in the Relegation Series of the Monaghan Senior Football Championship are relegated to the Intermediate ranks for the following season, with the Intermediate Football Championship winners and Intermediate Football League winners promoted in their place. If a team wins both the Intermediate Championship and League, then the next highest placed team in the League will be promoted.

The following teams have changed division since the 2024 championship season.

=== To S.F.C. ===
Promoted from 2024 Monaghan Intermediate Football Championship:

- Magheracloone Mitchells – (Championship Winners)
- Truagh Gaels – (League Winners)

=== From S.F.C. ===
Relegated to 2025 Monaghan Intermediate Football Championship:

- Donaghmoyne
- Killany Geraldines

== Participating teams ==
The clubs that competed in the 2025 Monaghan SFC were:

Club	Location	2024 Championship Position	2025 Championship Position
Aughnamullen	Aughnamullen	Relegation Series	Relegated to 2026 IFC
Ballybay Pearse Brothers	Ballybay	Semi-Finalist	Relegated to 2026 IFC
Clontibret O'Neills	Clontibret	Runners-Up	Semi-Finalist
Corduff Gaels	Corduff	Quarter-Finalist	Quarter-Finalist
Cremartin Shamrocks	Cremartin	Relegation Series	Relegation Series
Inniskeen Grattans	Inniskeen	Semi-Finalist	Runners-Up
Latton O'Rahilly	Latton	Quarter-Finalist	Quarter-Finalist
Magheracloone Mitchells	Magheracloone	IFC Champions	Semi-Finalist
Scotstown	Scotstown	Champions	Champions
Truagh Gaels	Emyvale	IFL Champions	Relegation Series

== Group stage ==
=== Group 1 ===
Advance to semi-finals Advance to quarter-finals Advance to relegation series

Team	Matches				Score			Pts
Team	Pld	W	D	L	For	Against	Diff	Pts
Clontibret O'Neills	4	3	1	0	110	84	+26	7
Corduff Gaels	4	3	0	1	91	76	+15	6
Scotstown	4	2	1	1	98	81	+17	5
Truagh Gaels	4	1	0	3	79	99	-20	2
Cremartin Shamrocks	4	0	0	4	75	113	-38	0

==== Round 1 ====
10 August 2025 Round 1	Truagh Gaels	3-20 (29) – (21) 3-12	Cremartin Shamrocks	Emyvale
14:00 IST (UTC+1)				Venue: St Mellan's Park

10 August 2025 Round 1	Clontibret O'Neills	3-20 (29) – (20) 3-11	Corduff Gaels	Clontibret
17:00 IST (UTC+1)				Venue: Páirc Uí Néill

==== Round 2 ====
16 August 2025 Round 2	Corduff Gaels	1-26 (29) – (13) 2-07	Truagh Gaels	Corduff
16:00 IST (UTC+1)				Venue: Páirc Gaeltacht Corr Dubh

16 August 2025 Round 2	Scotstown	1-22 (25) – (25) 1-22	Clontibret O'Neills	Scotstown
19:00 IST (UTC+1)				Venue: Páirc Mhuire

==== Round 3 ====
23 August 2025 Round 3	Cremartin Shamrocks	2-10 (16) – (22) 2-16	Corduff Gaels	Cremartin
18:30 IST (UTC+1)				Venue: Cremartin Shamrock Park

24 August 2025 Round 3	Truagh Gaels	0-17 (17) – (19) 0-19	Scotstown	Emyvale
17:00 IST (UTC+1)				Venue: St Mellan's Park

==== Round 4 ====
6 September 2025 Round 4	Clontibret O'Neills	2-24 (30) – (20) 2-14	Truagh Gaels	Clontibret
15:00 IST (UTC+1)				Venue: Páirc Uí Néill

6 September 2025 Round 4	Scotstown	6-18 (36) – (19) 3-10	Cremartin Shamrocks	Scotstown
18:00 IST (UTC+1)				Venue: Páirc Mhuire

==== Round 5 ====
14 September 2025 Round 5	Corduff Gaels	1-17 (20) – (18) 0-18	Scotstown	Corduff
17:00 IST (UTC+1)				Venue: Páirc Gaeltacht Corr Dubh

14 September 2025 Round 5	Cremartin Shamrocks	0-19 (19) – (26) 2-20	Clontibret O'Neills	Cremartin
17:00 IST (UTC+1)				Venue: Cremartin Shamrock Park

=== Group 2 ===
Advance to semi-finals Advance to quarter-finals Advance to relegation series

Team	Matches				Score			Pts
Team	Pld	W	D	L	For	Against	Diff	Pts
Inniskeen Grattans	4	4	0	0	74	50	+24	8
Latton O'Rahilly	4	3	0	1	77	58	+19	6
Magheracloone Mitchells	4	2	0	2	67	66	+1	4
Ballybay Pearse Brothers	4	1	0	3	61	77	-16	2
Aughnamullen	4	0	0	4	59	87	-28	0

==== Round 1 ====
8 August 2025 Round 1	Inniskeen Grattans	3-17 (26) – (15) 1-12	Ballybay Pearse Brothers	Inniskeen
16:00 IST (UTC+1)				Venue: Páirc Grattan

9 August 2025 Round 1	Latton O'Rahilly	5-15 (30) – (15) 1-12	Aughnamullen	Latton
19:00 IST (UTC+1)				Venue: O'Rahilly Park

==== Round 2 ====
17 August 2025 Round 2	Aughnamullen	0-14 (14) – (16) 2-10	Inniskeen Grattans	Aughnamullen
14:00 IST (UTC+1)				Venue: Páirc Shairseil

17 August 2025 Round 2	Magheracloone Mitchells	0-14 (14) – (20) 0-20	Latton O'Rahilly	Magheracloone
17:00 IST (UTC+1)				Venue: Carrickmacross-Kingscourt Road

==== Round 3 ====
23 August 2025 Round 3	Ballybay Pearse Brothers	0-19 (19) – (14) 0-14	Aughnamullen	Ballybay
15:30 IST (UTC+1)				Venue: Pearse Park

24 August 2025 Round 3	Inniskeen Grattans	1-13 (16) – (9) 0-09	Magheracloone Mitchells	Inniskeen
14:00 IST (UTC+1)				Venue: Páirc Grattan

==== Round 4 ====
7 September 2025 Round 4	Magheracloone Mitchells	2-16 (22) – (14) 1-11	Ballybay Pearse Brothers	Magheracloone
14:00 IST (UTC+1)				Venue: Carrickmacross-Kingscourt Road

7 September 2025 Round 4	Latton O'Rahilly	0-12 (12) – (16) 1-13	Inniskeen Grattans	Latton
17:00 IST (UTC+1)				Venue: O'Rahilly Park

==== Round 5 ====
14 September 2025 Round 5	Aughnamullen	0-16 (16) – (22) 2-16	Magheracloone Mitchells	Aughnamullen
17:00 IST (UTC+1)				Venue: Páirc Shairseil

14 September 2025 Round 5	Ballybay Pearse Brothers	0-13 (13) – (15) 2-09	Latton O'Rahilly	Ballybay
17:00 IST (UTC+1)				Venue: Pearse Park

== Relegation Series ==
Stay within S.F.C Relegated to 2026 I.F.C

=== Table ===
Team	Matches				Score			Pts
Team	Pld	W	D	L	For	Against	Diff	Pts
Truagh Gaels	2	2	0	0	44	30	+14	4
Cremartin Shamrocks	2	2	0	0	41	30	+11	4
Ballybay Pearse Brothers	2	0	0	2	32	39	-7	0
Aughnamullen	2	0	0	2	28	46	-18	0

=== Round 1 ===
27 September 2025 Relegation Series Round 1	Truagh Gaels	1-14 (17) – (16) 1-13	Ballybay Pearse Brothers	Emyvale
14:00 IST (UTC+1)				Venue: St Mellan's Park

27 September 2025 Relegation Series Round 1	Cremartin Shamrocks	1-16 (19) – (14) 2-08	Aughnamullen	Cremartin
14:00 IST (UTC+1)				Venue: Cremartin Shamrock Park

=== Round 2 ===
12 October 2025 Relegation Series Round 2	Aughnamullen	1-11 (14) – (27) 2-21	Truagh Gaels	Aughnamullen
12:00 IST (UTC+1)				Venue: Páirc Shairseil

12 October 2025 Relegation Series Round 2	Ballybay Pearse Brothers	0-16 (16) – (22) 2-16	Cremartin Shamrocks	Ballybay
12:00 IST (UTC+1)				Venue: Pearse Park

== Knockout stage ==
Quarter-finals

Semi-finals

Final

4 October, Inniskeen

Corduff Gaels
1-05

12 October, Clones

Magheracloone Mitchells
2-14

Magheracloone Mitchells
0-12

Inniskeen Grattans
0-23

26 October, Clones

Inniskeen Grattans
0-17

5 October, Clontibret

Scotstown
0-22

Latton O'Rahillys
0-11

12 October, Clones

Scotstown
1-22

Scotstown
2-15

Clontibret O'Neills
1-12

=== Quarter-finals ===
4 October 2025 Quarter-Final	Corduff Gaels	1-05 (8) – (20) 2-14	Magheracloone Mitchells	Inniskeen
16:30 IST (UTC+1)				Venue: Páirc Grattan

5 October 2025 Quarter-Final	Latton O'Rahilly	0-11 (11) – (25) 1-22	Scotstown	Clontibret
16:30 IST (UTC+1)				Venue: Páirc Uí Néíll

=== Semi-finals ===
12 October 2025 Semi-Final	Scotstown	2-15 (21) – (15) 1-12	Clontibret O'Neills	Clones
14:00 IST (UTC+1)				Venue: St Tiernach's Park

12 October 2025 Semi-Final	Inniskeen Grattans	0-23 (23) – (12) 0-12	Magheracloone Mitchells	Clones
15:45 IST (UTC+1)				Venue: St Tiernach's Park

=== Final ===
26 October 2025
15:30 IST (UTC+1)
Final

Report

Inniskeen Grattans	0-17 (17) – (22) 0-22 (a.e.t.)	Scotstown
(HT: 0-06 – 0-10) (FT: 0-15 – 0-15)
Pts: Seán Jones 0-5 (1tp, 2f), Andrew Woods 0-5 (1tp, 3f), Conor Jones 0-4 (2tp), Shane Hanratty 0-1, Michael Monahan 0-1, Shane O'Connor 0-1		Pts: Tommy Mallen 0-7 (1tp), Jack McCarron 0-4 (1tp, 2f), Shane Carey 0-4 (3f), Conor McCarthy 0-3 (1tp), Matthew Maguire 0-2 (1m), Rory Beggan 0-2 (tpf)

St Tiernach's Park, Clones
Referee: Raymond Malone (Castleblayney)
