= 2019 Monaghan Senior Football Championship =

Monaghan SFC
Tournament details
- County: Monaghan
- Year: 2019
- Trophy: Mick Duffy Cup
- Sponsor: Greenfield Foods
- Dates: 24 August - 20 October
- Teams: 10
- Defending champions: Scotstown

Winners
- Champions: Clontibret O'Neills (17th win)
- Manager: John McEntee
- Captain: Brian Greenan
- Qualify for: Ulster Club SFC

Runners-up
- Runners-up: Scotstown
- Manager: Kieran Donnelly
- Captain: Darren Hughes

Promotion/Relegation
- Relegated team(s): Doohamlet O'Neills (9th in SFL); Currin St. Patricks (10th in SFL)

Other
- Website: Monaghan GAA

The 2019 Monaghan Senior Football Championship was the 113th edition of Monaghan GAA's premier gaelic football tournament for senior clubs in County Monaghan, Ireland. Ten teams compete, with the winners representing Monaghan in the AIB GAA Ulster Club Senior Football Championship. The championship uses a double-elimination format for Rounds 1 and 2 before becoming knock-out.

Scotstown were the defending champions after defeating Ballybay Pearse Brothers in the 2018 final, and were aiming for their fifth consecutive title. The 2019 competition saw the return of Doohamlet and Currin to the Senior ranks following their promotion from the Intermediate competition.

Doohamlet O'Neill's and Currin were relegated to the 2020 IFC after they finished 9th and 10th in the Monaghan SFL respectively. They were replaced by Magheracloone Mitchels (IFC Winners) and Donaghmoyne (IFL Winners).

== Team changes ==
The two bottom-placed teams in the Monaghan Senior Football League are relegated to the Intermediate ranks for the following season, with the Intermediate Football Championship winners and Intermediate Football League winners promoted in their place. If a team wins both the Intermediate Championship and League, then the next highest placed team in the League will be promoted.

The following teams have changed division since the 2018 championship season.

=== To S.F.C. ===
Promoted from 2018 Monaghan Intermediate Football Championship:

- Doohamlet O'Neills – (Championship & League winners)
- Currin St. Patricks – (2nd in League)

=== From S.F.C. ===
Relegated to 2019 Monaghan Intermediate Football Championship:

- Magheracloone Mitchells (9th in League)
- Monaghan Harps (10th in League)

== Participating teams ==
Club	2018 C'ship Position	Last Success
Ballybay Pearse Brothers		2012
Carrickmacross Emmets		1919
Castleblayney Faughs		2003
Clontibret O'Neills		2014
Currin St. Patricks	Promoted	
Doohamlet O'Neills	Promoted	
Inniskeen Grattans		1948
Latton O'Rahillys		2011
Scotstown		2018
Truagh Gaels		

== Preliminary round ==
Four of the ten teams are drawn into the preliminary round. The remaining six teams are drawn in Round 1A. The winners of the two Preliminary rounds play each other in Round 1A.

24 August 2019 Preliminary round	Ballybay	2-17 (23) – (11) 2-05	Latton	Castleblayney
19:30 IST (UTC+1)				Venue: St. Mary's Park
				Referee: Stephen Hagan (Sean McDermotts)

25 August 2019 Preliminary round	Currin	2-11 (17) – (20) 1-17	Inniskeen	Aughnamullen
13:00 IST (UTC+1)				Venue: Sarsfield Park

== Round 1 ==
=== Round 1A ===
The six teams not drawn in the preliminary round enter the competition in this round, along with the two Preliminary round winners (who play each other). The four Round 1A winners proceed to Round 2A while the four losers enter the back-door in Round 1B.

24 August 2019 Round 1A	Clontibret	2-14 (20) – (20) 0-20 (a.e.t.) (2-0 pen)	Carrickmacross	Castleblayney
18:00 IST (UTC+1)				Venue: St. Mary's Park
				Referee: Colin Murphy (Sean McDermotts)
		Penalty shootout

25 August 2019 Round 1A	Doohamlet	2-12 (18) – (28) 5-13	Scotstown	Clontibret
15:30 IST (UTC+1)				Venue: O'Neill Park

25 August 2019 Round 1A	Truagh	4-15 (27) – (18) 2-12	Castleblayney	Clontibret
17:00 IST (UTC+1)				Venue: O'Neill Park

31 August 2019 Round 1A	Inniskeen	1-14 (17) – (20) 2-14	Ballybay	Clontibret
16:00 IST (UTC+1)				Venue: O'Neill Park
				Referee: Martin McNally (Corduff)

=== Round 1B ===
The losers of the preliminary round (two teams) enter this round along with the losers of Round 1A, but not that fixture which contains the preliminary round winners (three teams). A draw will be made to determine the two pairings, with the fifth team obtaining a bye into Round 2B. Two teams will exit the competition at this stage.

The following teams are eligible to take part in Round 1B -

- Carrickmacross
- Castleblayney
- Currin
- Doohamlet
- Latton

One team will receive a bye into Round 2B.

30 August 2019 Round 1B	Currin	1-11 (14) – (17) 2-11	Latton	Emyvale
20:00 IST (UTC+1)				Venue: St. Oliver Plunkett Park
				Referee: Niall McKenna (Emyvale)

31 August 2019 Round 1B	Doohamlet	2-12 (18) – (21) 2-15	Castleblayney	Clontibret
17:30 IST (UTC+1)				Venue: O'Neill Park
				Referee: Pat McEnaney (Corduff)

== Round 2 ==
=== Round 2A ===
The four winners from Round 1A play each other. The two winners proceed to the semi-finals while the losers must play in Round 3.

The following teams are eligible to take part in Round 2A -

- Clontibret
- Scotstown
- Truagh
- Ballybay

14 September 2019 Round 2A	Clontibret	0-13 (13) – (12) 0-12	Ballybay	Castleblayney
14:30 IST (UTC+1)				Venue: St. Mary's Park
				Referee: Fintan Finnegan (Castleblayney)

15 September 2019 Round 2A	Truagh	2-13 (19) – (19) 0-19 (a.e.t.) (2-4 pen)	Scotstown	Clontibret
16:30 IST (UTC+1)				Venue: O'Neill Park
				Referee: Brendan McNally (Cremartin)
		Penalty shootout

=== Round 2B ===
The two winners from Round 1B, one team who received a bye through Round 1B and the loser of the Round 1A tie involving the preliminary round winners play in this round. The winners will proceed to Round 3 while the losers will exit the championship. The following teams are eligible to take part in Round 2B -

- Latton
- Castleblayney
- Carrickmacross
- Inniskeen

13 September 2019 Round 2B	Carrickmacross	1-11 (14) – (08) 0-08	Inniskeen	Castleblayney
20:00 IST (UTC+1)				Venue: St. Mary's Park
				Referee: Xavier Coyle (Tyholland)

15 September 2019 Round 2B	Castleblayney	0-12 (12) – (14) 0-14	Latton	Clontibret
15:00 IST (UTC+1)				Venue: O'Neill Park
				Referee: Donal Connolly (Scotstown)

== Round 3 ==
The two winners from Round 2B play the two losers from Round 2A. The winners proceed to the semi-finals while the losers exit the championship.

The following teams are eligible to take part in Round 3 -

- Carrickmacross
- Latton
- Ballybay
- Truagh

28 September 2019 Round 3	Carrickmacross	0-12 (12) – (22) 2-16	Ballybay	Aughnamullen
17:00 IST (UTC+1)				Venue: Sarsfield Park
				Referee: Niall McKenna (Emyvale)

29 September 2019 Round 3	Latton	1-13 (16) – (12) 0-12	Truagh	Emyvale
13:00 IST (UTC+1)				Venue: St. Oliver Plunkett Park
				Referee: Brian Finnegan (Donaghmoyne)

== Semifinals ==
The two winners from Round 2A play the two winners from Round 3.

5 October 2019 Semifinal	Scotstown	1-08 (11) – (11) 0-11	Ballybay	Clontibret
16:30 IST (UTC+1)				Venue: O'Neill Park
				Referee: Anthony Marron (Corduff)
Note: Extra-time should have been played, but due to pitch waterlogging, the game was abandoned at full-time.

6 October 2019 Semifinal	Clontibret	1-10 (13) – (12) 0-12	Latton	Castleblayney
14:00 IST (UTC+1)				Venue: St. Mary's Park
				Referee: Patrick Caulfield (Blackhill)

12 October 2019 Semifinal Replay	Scotstown	3-12 (21) – (16) 1-13	Ballybay	Clones
16:30 IST (UTC+1)				Venue: St Tiernach's Park
				Referee: Martin McNally (Corduff)

== Final ==
20 October 2019
15:30 IST (UTC+1)
Final

Report

Scotstown	0-11 (11) – (17) 1-14	Clontibret
(HT: 0-03 – 0-09)
Pts: Conor McCarthy (4, 2f), Shane Carey (3, 3f), Rory Beggan (2, 2f), Darren Hughes, Micheál McCarville		Gls: Ryan McGuigan; Pts: Conor McManus (6, 2f), Michael P O’Dowd (2), Jack Gormley, Brian Greenan, Dessie Mone, Pauric Boyle, Francis Hughes, Killian Lavelle

St Tiernach's Park, Clones
Referee: Stephen Hagan (Seán McDermotts)

== See also ==
- 2019 AIB Ulster Club Senior Football Championship
