= 2018 Monaghan Senior Football Championship =

Monaghan SFC
Tournament details
- County: Monaghan
- Year: 2018
- Trophy: Mick Duffy Cup
- Sponsor: Greenfield Foods
- Dates: 25 August - 7 October
- Teams: 10
- Defending champions: Scotstown

Winners
- Champions: Scotstown (19th win)
- Manager: Kieran Donnelly
- Captain: Darren Hughes
- Qualify for: Ulster Club SFC

Runners-up
- Runners-up: Ballybay Pearse Brothers
- Manager: Mickey Donnelly
- Captain: Paul Finlay

Promotion/Relegation
- Relegated team(s): Magheracloone (9th in SFL); Monaghan Harps (10th in SFL)

Other
- Matches played: 17
- Total scored: 23-430
- Website: Monaghan GAA

The 2018 Monaghan Senior Football Championship was the 112th edition of Monaghan GAA's premier gaelic football tournament for senior clubs in County Monaghan, Ireland. Ten teams competed, with the winners representing Monaghan in the AIB GAA Ulster Club Senior Football Championship. The championship used a double-elimination format for Rounds 1 and 2 before becoming knock-out.

Scotstown were the defending champions after defeating Magheracloone in the 2017 final, and were aiming for their fourth consecutive title. The 2018 competition saw the return of Carrickmacross and Inniskeen to the Senior ranks following their promotion from the Intermediate competition.

== Team changes ==
The two bottom-placed teams in the Monaghan Senior Football League are relegated to the Intermediate ranks for the following season, with the Intermediate Football Championship winners and Intermediate Football League winners promoted in their place. If a team wins both the Intermediate Championship and League, then the next highest placed team in the League will be promoted.

The following teams have changed division since the 2017 championship season.

=== To S.F.C. ===
Promoted from 2017 Monaghan Intermediate Football Championship

- Carrickmacross Emmets - (Championship & League winners)
- Inniskeen Grattans - (2nd in League)

=== From S.F.C. ===
Relegated to 2018 Monaghan Intermediate Football Championship

- Donaghmoyne Fontenoys (9th in League)
- Killanny Geraldines (10th in League)

== Participating teams ==
Club	2017 C'ship Position	Pre-C'ship Odds	Last Success
Ballybay Pearse Brothers	Semi-final	11/2	2012
Carrickmacross Emmets	Promoted	12/1	1919
Castleblayney Faughs	Round 3	16/1	2003
Clontibret O'Neills	Round 2	11/2	2014
Inniskeen Grattans	Promoted	66/1	1948
Latton O'Rahillys	Semi-final	10/1	2011
Magheracloone Mitchells	runner-up	14/1	2004
Monaghan Harps	Round 2	25/1	1923
Scotstown	Winners	4/7	2017
Truagh Gaels	Round 3	25/1	

== Preliminary round ==
Four of the ten teams are drawn into the preliminary round. The remaining six teams are drawn in Round 1A. The winners of the two Preliminary Rounds play each other in Round 1A.

25 August 2018 Preliminary round	Truagh	1-21 (24) – (06) 0-06	Monaghan Harps	Scotstown
16:30 IST (UTC+1)				Venue: Pairc Mhuire
		Report		Referee: Martin McNally (Corduff)

26 August 2018 Preliminary round	Castleblayney	1-13 (16) – (13) 0-13	Inniskeen	Aughnamullen
14:30 IST (UTC+1)				Venue: Sarsfields Park
		Report		Referee: Stephen Hagan (Sean McDermotts)

== Round 1 ==
=== Round 1A ===
The six teams not drawn in the preliminary round enter the competition in this round, along with the two Preliminary Round winners (who play each other). The four Round 1A winners proceed to Round 2A while the four losers enter the back-door in Round 1B.

25 August 2018 Round 1A	Clontibret O'Neills	0-21 (21) – (18) 1-15	Latton	Scotstown
18:15 IST (UTC+1)				Venue: Pairc Mhuire
		Report		Referee: Anthony Marron (Corduff)

26 August 2018 Round 1A	Ballybay Pearse Brothers	1-19 (22) – (15) 2-09	Magheracloone	Clontibret
16:30 IST (UTC+1)				Venue: O'Neill Park
		Report		Referee: Brendan McNally (Cremartin)

26 August 2018 Round 1A	Carrickmacross	2-08 (14) – (17) 1-14	Scotstown	Clontibret
18:15 IST (UTC+1)				Venue: O'Neill Park
		Report		Referee: Ciaran Mulligan (Aghabog) (replaced after 15 mins); Barry Grimley (Cremartin)

1 September 2018 Round 1A	Truagh	1-09 (12) – (16) 0-16	Castleblayney	Clontibret
18:00 IST (UTC+1)				Venue: O'Neill Park
		Report		Referee: Pat McEnaney (Corduff)

=== Round 1B ===
The losers of the preliminary round (two teams) enter this round along with the losers of Round 1A, but not that fixture which contains the preliminary round winners (three teams). A draw will be made to determine the two pairings, with the fifth team obtaining a bye into Round 2B. Two teams will exit the competition at this stage.

The following teams are eligible to take part in Round 1B -

- Monaghan Harps
- Latton
- Inniskeen
- Magheracloone
- Carrickmacross

One team will receive a bye into Round 2B.

31 August 2018 Round 1B	Latton	0-11 (11) – (15) 1-12	Inniskeen	Castleblayney
20:15 IST (UTC+1)				Venue: St. Mary's Park
				Referee: Brian Finnegan (Donaghmoyne)

1 September 2018 Round 1B	Carrickmacross	2-18 (24) – (14) 0-14	Monaghan Harps	Clontibret
16:15 IST (UTC+1)				Venue: O'Neill Park
		Report		Referee: Patrick Caulfield (Blackhill)

== Round 2 ==
=== Round 2A ===
The four winners from Round 1A play each other. The two winners proceed to the semi-finals while the losers must play in Round 3.

The following teams are eligible to take part in Round 2A -

- Clontibret O'Neills
- Ballybay Pearse Brothers
- Scotstown
- Castleblayney

8 September 2018 Round 2A	Clontibret O'Neills	1-15 (18) – (16) 1-13 (a.e.t.)	Castleblayney	Inniskeen
16:00 IST (UTC+1)				Venue: Páirc Grattan
		Report		Referee: Martin McNally (Corduff)

9 September 2018 Round 2A	Scotstown	0-10 (10) – (09) 0-09	Ballybay Pearse Brothers	Clontibret
17:45 IST (UTC+1)				Venue: O'Neill Park
		Report		Referee: Niall McKenna (Emyvale)

=== Round 2B ===
The two winners from Round 1B, one team who received a bye through Round 1B and the loser of the Round 1A tie involving the preliminary round winners play in this round. The winners will proceed to Round 3 while the losers will exit the championship. The following teams are eligible to take part in Round 2B -

- Magheracloone
- Truagh
- Inniskeen
- Carrickmacross

8 September 2018 Round 2B	Carrickmacross	0-10 (10) – (11) 0-11	Magheracloone	Inniskeen
17:45 IST (UTC+1)				Venue: Páirc Grattan
		Report		Referee: Brendan McNally (Cremartin)

9 September 2018 Round 2B	Inniskeen	2-05 (11) – (13) 0-13	Truagh	Clontibret
16:00 IST (UTC+1)				Venue: O'Neill Park
		Report		Referee: Xavier Coyle (Tyholland)

== Round 3 ==
The two winners from Round 2B play the two losers from Round 2A. The winners proceed to the semi-finals while the losers exit the championship.

The following teams are eligible to take part in Round 3 -

- Castleblayney
- Magheracloone
- Truagh
- Ballybay Pearse Brothers

14 September 2018 Round 3	Castleblayney	0-09 (09) – (10) 0-10	Magheracloone	Inniskeen
20:15 IST (UTC+1)				Venue: Páirc Grattan
				Referee: David Hurson (Drumhowan)

15 September 2018 Round 3	Truagh	0-13 (13) – (16) 0-16	Ballybay Pearse Brothers	Emyvale
19:30 IST (UTC+1)				Venue: St. Oliver Plunkett Park
				Referee: Patrick Caulfield (Blackhill)

== Semi-finals ==
The two winners from Round 2A play the two winners from Round 3.

23 September 2018
15:00 IST (UTC+1)
Semi-final

Report

Scotstown	1-17 (20) – (17) 2-11	Magheracloone
(HT: 1-10 – 2-05)
Gls: Francis Maguire; Pts: Conor McCarthy (5, 3f), Shane Carey (4, 2f), Orin Heaphey (3), Rory Beggan (2, 2f), Ross McKenna, Francis Maguire		Gls: Peter Ward, Liam Óg Murray; Pts: Alan McCahey (6, 5f), Padraig McMahon, Michael Metzger, Allan Kieran (’45), Liam Óg Murray, Peter Ward

St. Tiernach's Park, Clones
Referee: Xavier Coyle (Tyholland)

23 September 2018
16:45 IST (UTC+1)
Semi-final

Report

Clontibret O'Neills	1-08 (11) – (18) 1-15	Ballybay Pearse Brothers
(HT: 1-04 – 0-09)
Gls: Conor McManus; Pts: Conor McManus (3, 2f), Pauric Boyle (2), Michael P O'Dowd, Francis Hughes, Dean McDonnell		Gls: Christopher McGuinness; Pts: Paul Finlay (7, 5f), Christopher McGuinness (3, 1f), Shane McGuinness (2), Colm Lennon, Aaron Toner, Eoin McKearney

St. Tiernach's Park, Clones
Referee: Stephen Hagan (Sean McDermotts)

== Final ==
TG4

7 October 2018
15:30 IST (UTC+1)
Final

Report

Scotstown	1-13 (16) – (13) 0-13	Ballybay Pearse Brothers
(HT: 0-08 – 0-04)
Gls: Conor McCarthy; Pts: Conor McCarthy (3, 2f), Shane Carey (3, 2f), Francis Maguire (2), Rory Beggan (2, 2f), Dónal Morgan, Kieran Hughes, Jamie McCarey		Pts: Dessie Ward (5), Paul Finlay (3, 2f), Shane McGuinness (2), Mark McArdle, Brent Wylie, Thomas Kerr

St. Tiernach's Park, Clones
Referee: Anthony Marron (Corduff)
Attendance: 4,496

== See also ==
- 2018 AIB Ulster Club Senior Football Championship
