= 2017 Monaghan Senior Football Championship =

Monaghan SFC
Tournament details
- County: Monaghan
- Year: 2017
- Trophy: Mick Duffy Cup
- Sponsor: Greenfield Foods
- Date: 23 July - 15 October
- Teams: 10
- Defending champions: Scotstown

Winners
- Champions: Scotstown (17th win)
- Manager: Kieran Donnelly
- Captain: Donal Morgan
- Qualify for: Ulster Club SFC

Runners-up
- Runners-up: Magheracloone
- Manager: Keith Gilsenan
- Captain: James Ward

Promotion/Relegation
- Relegated team(s): Donaghmoyne (9th in League); Killanny (10th in League)

Other
- Matches played: 18
- Total scored: 34-452
- Player of the Year: Kieran Hughes (Scotstown)
- Website: Monaghan GAA

The 2017 Monaghan Senior Football Championship was the 111th edition of Monaghan GAA's premier gaelic football tournament for senior clubs in County Monaghan, Ireland. Ten teams competed, with the winner representing Monaghan in the Ulster Senior Club Football Championship. The championship began with a back door system for the first two rounds before becoming knock-out.

Scotstown were the defending champions after they defeated Clontibret O'Neills in the 2016 final to claim a "2-in-a-row" of S.F.C. titles, and they successfully defended their crown when defeating Magheracloone Mitchel's in this season's final.

Donaghmoyne returned to the senior grade after a 1-year absence since being relegated in 2015. Killanny Geraldine's returned to the top flight after a 31-season exodus since relegation in 1985 when claiming the Intermediate Football League in 2016.

Kilanny Geraldines and Donaghmoyne Fontenoys were relegated to the I.F.C. for 2018 after finishing 10th and 9th in the S.F.L. respectively. They will be replaced by I.F.C. and I.F.L. champions Carrickmacross Emmets as well as I.F.L. runners-up Inniskeen Grattans.

== Team changes ==
The following teams have changed division since the 2016 championship season.

=== To S.F.C. ===
Promoted from 2016 Monaghan Intermediate Football Championship

- Donaghmoyne Fontenoys - (I.F.C. Champions)
- Killanny Geraldines - (I.F.L. Champions)

=== From S.F.C. ===
Relegated to 2017 Monaghan Intermediate Football Championship

- Carrickmacross Emmets (9th in S.F.L.)
- Doohamlet O'Neills (10th in S.F.L.)

== Participating teams ==
Club	2016 C'ship Position	Pre-C'ship Odds	Last Success
Ballybay Pearse Brothers	Semifinalist	7/2	2012
Castleblayney Faughs	Round 1	33/1	2003
Clontibret O'Neills	Runner-Up	7/2	2014
Donaghmoyne Fontenoys	Promoted	50/1	1947
Killanny Geraldines	Promoted	66/1	
Latton O'Rahillys	Round 3	16/1	2011
Magheraclooone Mitchells	Semifinalist	20/1	2004
Monaghan Harps	Round 2	11/1	1923
Scotstown	Winners	8/11	2016
Truagh Gaels	Round 3	16/1	

== Preliminary round ==
Four of the ten senior clubs in a play each other in a random draw. The two winners proceed to Round 1A while the two losers proceed to Round 1B.

23 July 2017	Truagh	3-09 - 0-14	Donaghmoyne	Clontibret
17:30	D Finnegan (1-2), C McRory (1-1), N McQuillan (1-0), C McAnenly (0-3, 0-1f), P Treanor, C McKenna (f), P McKenna (f) (0-1 each)	Report	D Garland (0-9, 0-8f), S Finnegan, A Courtney (0-2 each), S McElroy (0-1)	Stadium: O'Neill Park; Referee: Xavier Coyle (Tyholland)

13 August 2017	Magheracloone	0-15 - 1-10	Monaghan Harps	Castleblayney
17:15				Stadium: St. Mary's Park; Referee: Brian Finnegan (Donaghmoyne)

== Round 1 ==
=== Round 1A ===
The six remaining teams are drawn in this round, along with the two Preliminary round winners (who play each other). The four winners proceed to Round 2A while the four losers must play in Round 1B.

12 August 2017	Ballybay Pearse Brothers	0-18 - 2-10	Castleblayney	Clontibret
19:00	C McGuinness (0-7, 0-4f), P Finlay (0-5, 0-3f), D Ward (0-2), E McKearney, P O'Neill, C Galligan, T Kerr (0-1 each)	Report	D Malone (1-4, 0-1f), C Hanratty (1-2), M Treanor (0-2), M Kelly, D McMahon (0-1 each)	Stadium: O'Neill Park; Referee: Martin McNally (Corduff)

13 August 2017	Scotstown	4-16 - 2-11	Killanny	Clontibret
13:30	Conor McCarthy 2-1, Shane Carey 1-2 (0-1f), James Turley 0-3, Michael McCarville 1-0, Ross McKenna 0-2, Rory Beggan (1 '45), Sean Mohan, Paul Sherlock, Emmet Caulfield, Kieran Hughes, Orin Heaphey, David McCague, Francis Maguire 0-1 each	Report	Daryl Treanor and Gavin Flanagan (0-1f) 1-2 each, Ronan Duffy, MJ Callan, Tiernan Duffy, Stephen McMahon, Peter Dooley, Conor Russell, Gavin Traynor 0-1	Stadium: O'Neill Park; Referee: Stephen Hagan (Sean McDermott's)

13 August 2017	Latton	1-13 - 0-12	Clontibret	Castleblayney
19:00				Stadium: St. Mary's Park; Referee: Niall McKenna (Emyvale)

20 August 2017	Magheracloone	0-13 - 0-05	Truagh	Castleblayney
17:30				Stadium: St. Mary's Park; Referee: David Hurson (Drumhowan)

=== Round 1B ===
The losers of the preliminary round (two teams). The losers of Round 1A, but not that fixture which contains the preliminary round winners (three teams). A draw will be made to determine the two pairings, with the fifth team obtaining a bye into Round 2B.

The following teams are eligible to take part in Round 1B -

- Donaghmoyne
- Monaghan Harps
- Killanny
- Castleblayney
- Clontibret

Monaghan Harps received a bye into Round 2B.

20 August 2017	Castleblayney	1-13 - 0-10	Killanny	Aughnamullen
13:15				Stadium: Sarsfield Park; Referee: Brendan McNally (Cremartin)

20 August 2017	Clontibret O'Neills	2-14 - 0-09	Donaghmoyne	Castleblayney
19:15				Stadium: St. Mary's Park; Referee: Martin McGinn (Aughnamullen)

== Round 2 ==
=== Round 2A ===
The 4 winners from Round 1A play each other. The 2 winners proceed to the semi-finals while the losers must play in Round 3B.

2 September 2017	Magheracloone	0-15 - 0-14	Ballybay Pearse Brothers	Clontibret
15:30	Tomás Freeman 0-10 (0-6f), Barry Kiernan 0-3, Gavin Doogan and James Lambe 0-1 each	Report	Paul Finlay 0-6 (0-5f), Christopher McGuinness 0-4, Ryan Wylie, Eoin McKearney, Dessie Ward, Shane McGuinness 0-1 each	Stadium: O'Neill Park; Referee: Donal Connolly (Scotstown)

2 September 2017	Scotstown	1-18 - 1-17	Latton	Clontibret
17:15	Shane Carey 0-5 (0-4f), Ross McKenna 1-1, Kieran Hughes 0-4, Conor McCarthy (0-1f) and Francis Maguire 0-2 each, William Carroll, Damian McArdle, Emmet Caulfield, Darren Hughes 0-1 each		Hugh McElroy 1-8 (1-0 pen, 0-5f), Bernard O'Brien 0-3, Owen Coyle 0-2 (0-1f), Stephen Fitzpatrick, Kieran Duffy, Aidan Farmer, Owen Duffy 0-1 each	Stadium: O'Neill Park; Referee: Jason McAndrew (Ballybay)

=== Round 2B ===
The 2 winners from Round 1B play and the 2 teams who received byes through Round 1B play in this round. The 2 winners proceed to Round 3B while the losers exit the championship.

1 September 2017	Truagh	2-11 - 1-13	Clontibret O'Neills	Emyvale
20:00	Christopher McAnenly 1-2, Ryan Mohan 1-0, Padraig McKenna 0-3 (0-2f), Christopher McKenna 0-2f, Niall Coyle, Niall Feely, James McKenna, Aaron Mohan 0-1 each	Report	Conor McManus 0-5f, MP O'Dowd 1-1, Ryan McGuigan 0-3 (0-1f), Dessie Mone 0-2, Conor Boyle and Rodney Gorman 0-1 each	Stadium: St. Oliver Plunkett Park; Referee: Pat McEnaney (Corduff)

2 September 2017	Castleblayney	1-10 - 0-10	Monaghan Harps	Inniskeen
19:30	Dermot Malone 0-6f, Patrick Tavey 1-0, John Beattie, David McMahon, Ciaran Hanrartty (0-1f), Darren Daly 0-1 each		Fearghal McMahon 0-4f, Liam Hahessy 0-3 (0-2f), Conor Galligan, Kevin Loughran, Shane Smyth (0-1f) 0-1 each	Stadium: Grattan Park; Referee: Anthony Marron (Corduff)

== Round 3B ==
The 2 winners from Round 2B play against the 2 losers from Round 2A. The 2 winners proceed to the semi-finals while the losers exit the championship.

10 September 2017	Latton	0-09 - 0-08	Castleblayney	Scotstown
15:30				Stadium: St. Mary's Park; Referee: Ciaran Mulligan (Aghabog)

10 September 2017	Ballybay Pearse Brothers	1-14 - 0-12	Truagh	Scotstown
17:15				Stadium: St. Mary's Park; Referee: Anthony Marron (Corduff)

== Semifinals ==
The 2 winners from Round 2A play against the 2 winners from Round 3B.

24 September 2017	Magheracloone	4-12 - 1-18	Latton	Clones
14:00				Stadium: St. Tiernach's Park; Referee: Niall McKenna (Emyvale)

24 September 2017	Scotstown	2-08 - 0-14	Ballybay Pearse Brothers	Clones
16:00	Conor McCarthy 0-4 (0-2f), Francis Caulfield and Micheal McCarville 1-0 each, William Carroll, Sean Mohan, James Hamill, Darren Hughes 0-1 each		Paul Finlay 0-6 (0-5f), Shane McGuinness 0-3 (0-1f), Christopher McGuinness 0-2 (0-1f), Ryan Wylie, Ciaran Galligan, Dessie Ward	Stadium: St. Tiernach's Park; Referee: Martin McNally (Corduff)

30 September 2017	Scotstown	2-12 - 0-15	Ballybay Pearse Brothers	Clontibret
15:00				Stadium: O'Neill Park; Referee: Pat McEnaney (Corduff)

== Final ==
15 October 2017; 3:30 pm	Scotstown	2-17 - 0-13	Magheraclooone	St. Tiernach's Park; Clones; Referee: Xavier Coyle (Tyholland); Man of the Match: Conor McCarthy
15 October 2017; 3:30 pm	Conor McCarthy 1-8 (0-4f), Darren Hughes 1-1, Rory Beggan 0-3 (2 '45, 0-1f), Damien McArdle, James Hamill, Shane Carey, Dermot McCrudden, Orin Heaphey 0-1 each		Tomas Freeman 0-5f, Michael Metzger 0-3 (0-2f), Gavin Doogan 0-2, James Ward, Jamie Kieran, Allan Kieran 0-1 each	St. Tiernach's Park; Clones; Referee: Xavier Coyle (Tyholland); Man of the Match: Conor McCarthy

== See also ==
- 2017 AIB Ulster Senior Club Championship
- 2017 AIB GAA Football All-Ireland Senior Club Championship
