= Conor McCarthy (Monaghan Gaelic footballer) =

Irish Gaelic footballer (born 1995)

Personal information
- Native name: Concobhar Mac Cárthaigh (Irish)
- Born: 7 August 1995 (age 31) San Francisco, California, U.S.

Sport
- Sport: Gaelic football
- Position: Left half-back
Club
- Years: Club
- Scotstown
Club titles
- Monaghan titles: 8
- Ulster titles: 0
College
- Years: College
- University College Dublin
College titles
- Sigerson titles: 2
Inter-county
- Years: County
- 2016–: Monaghan
Inter-county titles
- Ulster titles: 0
- All Stars: 1

Conor McCarthy (born 7 August 1995) is an Irish Gaelic footballer who plays for the Monaghan county team and the Scotstown club.

== Early life ==
McCarthy spent the first eight years of his life in San Francisco, before moving to Scotstown. He took up Gaelic football shortly after arriving, joining the Scotstown club.

== Playing career ==
=== University ===
During his studies at University College Dublin, McCarthy was a regular on their senior football team. On 20 February 2016, McCarthy started the Sigerson Cup final against Dublin City University. McCarthy scored two points as UCD won their first Sigerson title in 20 years.

On 18 February 2017, McCarthy was in the half-forward line for the Sigerson Cup final against St Mary's University College, Belfast. UCD took an early lead through two goals from Colm Basquel. McCarthy added two points, but St Mary's came back to win the final by a point. McCarthy was named on the Sigerson Cup team of the year at the end of the season.

McCarthy started his third Sigerson final on 17 February 2018, where UCD faced NUI Galway. McCarthy top-scored with 1–6, and a late Liam Casey point sealed a one-point win for UCD. McCarthy was later named on the Sigerson Cup team of the year for a second time.

=== Club ===
On 13 October 2013, McCarthy was at corner-forward as Scotstown faced Clontibret O'Neills in the final of the Monaghan Senior Football Championship, scoring 0–3 in a comfortable win for Scotstown. The same two teams met in the 2014 final, with Clontibret winning the final by a point. McCarthy won his second county final in 2015, scoring 1–2 in the nine-point win over Monaghan Harps. On 29 November 2015, Scotstown faced Crossmaglen Rangers in the final of the Ulster Senior Club Football Championship. McCarthy scored two points as Crossmaglen claimed a five-point win after extra-time.

Scotstown won the county final in 2016, but McCarthy didn't feature through injury. The 2017 final saw Scotstown against Magheracloone Mitchells. McCarthy finished with a personal tally of 1–8 as Scotstown were ten-point winners. Scotstown played Ballybay Pearse Brothers in the 2018 final, with McCarthy scoring 1–3 as Scotstown won their fourth title in a row. On 2 December 2018, McCarthy played in his second Ulster club final against Gaoth Dobhair, scoring a point as Scotstown suffered another extra-time loss. In the 2019 county final, Clontibret ended Scotstown's five-in-a-row bid with a 1–14 to 0–11 win.

Scotstown won back the county title in 2020, with McCarthy scoring 1–5 in the final against Ballybay. McCarthy scored 1–1 in the 2021 final against Truagh Gaels as Scotstown defended their title. Scotstown played in their tenth final in a row in 2022, with Ballybay coming out winners by 1–11 to 1–8. Scotstown regained the title in 2023, McCarthy scoring two points in the win over Inniskeen. In the Ulster semi-final against Trillick, McCarthy scored a 64th minute equalising point to send the match to extra-time. Scotstown won the match in extra-time to reach the Ulster final. In the final against Glen, McCarthy scored a point but Glen were 0–13 to 0–11 winners.

=== Inter-county ===
==== Minor and under-21 ====
On 22 July 2012, McCarthy was in the half-forward line as the Monaghan minor team faced Tyrone in the Ulster final. McCarthy scored 1–2, but Tyrone were three-point winners. On 21 July 2013, McCarthy was in the full forward against Tyrone in his second consecutive Ulster final, scoring a point in their 4–10 to 2–14 win. In the All-Ireland semi-final against Mayo, McCarthy finished with a personal tally of 1–4 as Monaghan suffered a heavy defeat.

On 6 April 2016, McCarthy scored three points in Monaghan's two-point win over Tyrone in the Ulster under-21 final. In the All-Ireland semi-final against Cork, McCarthy scored three points, but Cork won the match by 2–15 to 1–16.

==== Senior ====
McCarthy joined the Monaghan senior panel in 2016, and made his championship debut on 5 June, scoring two points in a win over Down. Monaghan reached the All-Ireland semi-final for the first time in 30 years in 2018, facing Tyrone on 12 August. McCarthy scored 0–3, but Tyrone won the match by a point.

On 22 May 2021, McCarthy scored a hat-trick against Donegal in a National League match, the game ended in a draw. On 31 July, McCarthy played in his first Ulster final, with Monaghan facing Tyrone at Croke Park. McCarthy scored two points, but Tyrone held on to win the match by 0–16 to 0–15.

In the 2023 season, McCarthy was converted to a half-back role by manager Vinny Corey. On 25 June, McCarthy scored 1–2, including a 75th minute winning point, as Monaghan beat Kildare in the All-Ireland preliminary quarter-final. In the quarter-final against Armagh, McCarthy scored three points as Monaghan advanced to the semi-final after a penalty shoot-out. Dublin ended Monaghan's season in the semi-final with a seven-point win. At the end of the season, McCarthy was named on The Sunday Game Team of the Year, and was also named on the All-Star team.

== Honours ==
Monaghan

- Ulster Under-21 Football Championship: 2016
- Ulster Minor Football Championship: 2013

UCD

- Sigerson Cup: 2016, 2018

Scotstown

- Monaghan Senior Football Championship: 2013, 2015, 2016, 2017, 2018, 2020, 2021, 2023

Individual

- All Star Award: 2023
- The Sunday Game Team of the Year: 2023
- GAA Higher Education Rising Stars Football Team: 2017, 2018
