= 2025–26 All-Ireland Senior Club Football Championship =

Gaelic football competition

- Dates: 1 November 2025 – 18 January 2026
- Teams: 32
- Sponsor: Allied Irish Bank
- Champions: Dingle; Paul Geaney (captain); Padraig Corcoran (manager)
- Runners-up: St Brigid's; Paul McGrath (captain); Anthony Cunningham (manager)

Provincial Champions
- Connacht: St Brigid's
- Leinster: Ballyboden St Enda's
- Munster: Dingle
- Ulster: Scotstown

The 2025–26 All-Ireland Senior Club Football Championship was the 55th staging of the All-Ireland Senior Club Football Championship, the Gaelic Athletic Association's premier inter-county club Gaelic football tournament. The competition ran from 1 November 2025 to 18 January 2026.

The defending champions were Cuala; however, they were knocked out of the Dublin SFC at the Semi-Final stage.

The final was played on 18 January 2026 at Croke Park in Dublin, between Dingle and St Brigid's, in what was their first ever championship meeting. Dingle won the match after extra time, by 0–23 to 1–19, to claim a first title.

== Format ==
Each Irish county plays a county championship, with one club from each county progressing to the All-Ireland Senior Club Football Championship. In this, each province plays their own championship (all being straight knockout) with the four provincial champions qualifying for the All-Ireland semi-finals.

The Kilkenny champion do not compete in Leinster, instead playing in the 2025–26 All-Ireland Intermediate Club Football Championship, while the London champion compete in the Connacht Club SFC.

== Teams ==
Team	County	Most recent success		
Team	County	All-Ireland	Provincial	County
Athy	Kildare			2020
Ballina Stephenites	Mayo	2005	2007	2024
Ballyboden St Enda's	Dublin	2016	2019	2019
Baltinglass	Wicklow	1990	1989	2020
Castletown Liam Mellows	Wexford			2024
Clonmel Commercials	Tipperary		2015	2023
Dingle	Kerry			1948
The Downs	Westmeath			2022
Dunloy	Antrim			1936
Éire Óg	Clare			2024
Erne Gaels	Fermanagh			2024
Kilcoo	Down	2022	2021	2024
Killoe Young Emmets	Longford			2023
Kingscourt Stars	Cavan			2015
Leitrim Gaels	Leitrim			
Loughmacrory St Teresa's	Tyrone			
Madden Raparees	Armagh			
Moycullen	Galway		2022	2022
Mungret St. Paul's	Limerick			
Naomh Conaill	Donegal			2023
Naomh Máirtín	Louth			2021
Newbridge	Derry			2024
North London Shamrocks	London			2024
Old Leighlin	Carlow			2013
Portarlington	Laois			2024
Rathgormack	Waterford			2024
Scotstown	Monaghan		1989	2024
Shamrock Gaels	Sligo			1992
St Brigid's	Roscommon	2013	2023	2023
St Finbarr's	Cork	1987	2021	2021
Summerhill	Meath		1977	2023
Tullamore	Offaly			2024

== Connacht ==
Quarter-finals
Ballina Stephenites (Mayo)	1-15
North London Shamrocks (London)	0-10
Shamrock Gaels (Sligo)	1-09
Moycullen (Galway)	1-20

Semi-finals
St Brigid's (Roscommon)	1-21
Ballina Stephenites (Mayo)	3-08
Leitrim Gaels (Leitrim)	1-09
Moycullen (Galway)	4-13

Final
St Brigid's (Roscommon)	1-16
Moycullen (Galway)	1-14

=== Quarter-finals ===
8 November 2025 Quarter-final	Ballina Stephenites (Mayo)	1-15 (18) – (10) 0-10	North London Shamrocks (London)	Bekan
18:30 GMT (UTC+0)		(HT: 1-06 – 0-07)		Venue: Connacht GAA Centre
	Pts: Luke Doherty 1-1, Mike Murray 0-3 (1tp), Sam Callinan 0-2, Conor McStay 0-2, Frank Irwin 0-2 (tp), Ben Thornton 0-2 (tp), David Tighe 0-1, Dylan Thornton 0-1, Evan Regan 0-1 (f)	Report	Pts: Joe McGill 0-6 (1tp, 1tpf, 2f), Michael Carroll 0-2, Michael Miller 0-1, Paddy Dolan 0-1	Referee: James Molloy (Galway)

9 November 2025 Quarter-final	Shamrock Gaels (Sligo)	1-09 (12) – (23) 1-20	Moycullen (Galway)	Tubbercurry
13:30 GMT (UTC+0)		(HT: 1-03 – 0-10)		Venue: Kilcoyne Park
	Pts: Shane Deignan 1-1, Lee Deignan 0-4 (1'45), Ciarán Kenny 0-3 (1tp), David Quinn 0-1	Report	Pts: Dessie Conneely 1-10 (7f), Fionn McDonagh 0-4, Niall Walsh 0-2, Seán O'Connor, David Wynne 0-1, Paul Kelly 0-1, Johnny Maloney 0-1	Referee: Ian Monaghan (Roscommon)

=== Semi-finals ===
16 November 2025 Semi-final	St Brigid's (Roscommon)	1-21 (24) – (17) 3-08	Ballina Stephenites (Mayo)	Roscommon
13:30 GMT (UTC+0)		(HT: 1-12 – 2-01)		Venue: Dr Hyde Park
	Pts: Ruaidhrí Fallon 0-4 (1tp), Senan Kilbride 1-0, Ben O'Carroll 0-3 (1f), Shane Cunnane 0-2, Ciarán Sugrue 0-2, Bobby Nugent 0-2, Paul McGrath 0-2, Brian Derwin 0-2, Charlie O'Connell 0-2, Conor Hand 0-1, Ronan Stack 0-1	Report	Pts: Evan Regan 1-3 (2f), Dylan Thornton 1-0, Ben Thornton 1-0, Mike Murray 0-3 (1tp), Sam Callinan 0-1, Frank Irwin 0-1	Referee: Barry Judge (Sligo)

16 November 2025 Semi-final	Leitrim Gaels (Leitrim)	1-09 (12) – (25) 4-13	Moycullen (Galway)	Galway
13:30 GMT (UTC+0)		(HT: 1-02 – 2-09)		Venue: Pearse Stadium
	Pts: Garvan Jones 1-4 (3f), Shaun Chandler 0-1, Aidan Flynn 0-1, Stephen Goldrick 0-1, David Regan 0-1, Liam Moreton 0-1	Report	Pts: Dessie Conneely 1-7 (2tpf), Fionn McDonagh 2-3 (2f), Fiachra McDonagh 1-0, Johnny Moloney 0-1, Seán O'Connor 0-1, Niall Walsh 0-1	Referee: Jerome Henry (Mayo)

=== Final ===
TG4

30 November 2025
13:00 GMT (UTC+0)
Final

Report

St Brigid's (Roscommon)	1-16 (19) – (17) 1-14	Moycullen (Galway)
(HT: 0-08 – 1-05)
Pts: Conor Hand 0-7 (2tp), Ruaidhrí Fallon 1-0, Ben O'Carroll 0-3 (1f), Paul McGrath 0-1, Shane Cunnane 0-1, Ciarán Sugrue 0-1, Bobby Nugent 0-1 (f), Brian Derwin 0-1, Mark Daly 0-1		Pts: Dessie Conneely 0-5 (1tpf, 1f, 1m), Fiachra McDonagh 1-1, Fionn McDonagh 0-3, David Wynne 0-2, Niall Walsh 0-2, Paul Kelly 0-1

Dr Hyde Park, Roscommon
Referee: Liam Devenney (Mayo)

== Leinster ==
First round
Baltinglass (Wicklow)	0-10
Athy (Kildare)	3-16
Summerhill (Meath)	2-22
Killoe (Longford)	1-16
Old Leighlin (Carlow)	0-06
Portarlington (Laois)	1-12

Quarter-finals
Athy (Kildare)	1-16
Summerhill (Meath)	0-09
Naomh Máirtín (Louth)	1-08
Portarlington(Laois)	0-14
The Downs (Westmeath)	4-08
Tullamore (Offaly)	3-13
Castletown (Wexford)	0-13
Ballyboden (Dublin)	2-16

Semi-finals
Athy (Kildare)	0-19
Portarlington(Laois)	0-11
Tullamore (Offaly)	0-10
Ballyboden (Dublin)	2-19

Final
Athy (Kildare)	1-14
Ballyboden (Dublin)	2-18

=== First round ===
1 November 2025 First Round	Old Leighlin (Carlow)	0-06 (6) – (15) 1-12	Portarlington (Laois)	Carlow
18:15 GMT (UTC+0)		(HT: 0-03 – 0-09)		Venue: Dr Cullen Park
	Pts: Mikey Bambrick 0-2, Seamus Kinsella 0-2 (2f), Aaron Amond 0-1, Seán Taylor 0-1	Report	Pts: Rioghan Murphy 1-2 (1f), Colm Murphy 0-4 (4f), Patrick O'Sullivan 0-2, Jordan Fitzpatrick 0-2, Ronan Coffey 0-1, Seán Michael Corcoran 0-1	Referee: Ian Howley (Dublin); TV: RTÉ 2

2 November 2025 First Round	Summerhill (Meath)	2-22 (28) – (19) 1-16	Killoe Young Emmets (Longford)	Navan
13:30 GMT (UTC+0)		(HT: 0-07 – 1-10)		Venue: Páirc Tailteann
	Pts: Jamie O'Shea 1-2, Eoghan Frayne 0-5 (1tpf, 1f), Adam McDonnell 0-4 (1tp), Adam Flanagan 1-0, Diarmuid McCabe 0-2, Seán Muddiman 0-2 (1'45), Liam Shaw 0-2, Kevin Ryan 0-1, David Larkin 0-1, Conor Frayne 0-1, Conor Lyons 0-1, John Lavelle 0-1	Report	Pts: Paddy Moran 0-7 (5f), Larry Moran 1-0, Michael Hughes 0-2 (tpf), Paddy Kiernan 0-2 (tp), James Moran 0-2, Cian Farrelly 0-1, Mark Hughes 0-1, Ronan McGoldrick 0-1	Referee: Alan Coyne (Westmeath)

2 November 2025 First Round	Baltinglass (Wicklow)	0-10 (10) – (25) 3-16	Athy (Kildare)	Aughrim
13:30 GMT (UTC+0)		(HT: 0-06 – 1-07)		Venue: Aughrim County Ground
	Pts: Mark Jackson 0-3 (1tpf, 1f), Johnny Keogh 0-2 (tp), Jack Kirwan 0-2 (tp), Christopher Heaslip 0-1, Adam McHugh 0-1, Tommy Keogh 0-1 (f)	Report	Pts: Ronan Kelly 2-2, Dylan Hyland 0-4 (2tp), Niall Kelly 0-4, James McGrath 1-0, Kevin Feely 0-2 (1f), Ben Purcell 0-2, Colm Moran 0-1, Seán Bride 0-1	Referee: David Hickey (Carlow); TV: TG4

=== Quarter-finals ===
15 November 2025 Quarter-final	Athy (Kildare)	1-16 (19) – (9) 0-09	Summerhill (Meath)	Newbridge
17:15 GMT (UTC+0)		(HT: 1-06 – 0-08)		Venue: St Conleth's Park
	Pts: Brian Maher 1-0, Kevin Feely 0-3, Seán Moore 0-3, Niall Kelly 0-3 (1f, 1tp), Colm Moran 0-2, Ben Purcell 0-2, James McGrath 0-1, David Hyland 0-1, Cian Keaveney 0-1	Report	Pts: Liam Shaw 0-4 (2f), Diarmuid McCabe 0-2 (tp), Barry Dardis 0-1, Jamie O'Shea 0-1, Conor Lyons 0-1	Referee: Anthony Nolan (Wicklow); TV: RTÉ 2

16 November 2025 Quarter-final	Naomh Máirtín (Louth)	1-08 (11) – (14) 0-14	Portarlington (Laois)	Drogheda
13:30 GMT (UTC+0)		(HT: 0-04 – 0-09)		Venue: Gaelic Grounds
	Pts: Sam Mulroy 0-4 (2f), Tom Gray 1-0, Dara McDonnell 0-2 (tp), Jack Murphy 0-1, Darragh Dorian 0-1	Report	Pts: Darragh Galvin 0-4, Colm Murphy 0-4 (4f), Rioghan Murphy 0-2, Ronan Coffey 0-1, Mikey Bennett 0-1, Jason Moore 0-1, Darragh Slevin 0-1	Referee: Patrick Coyle (Meath)

16 November 2025 Quarter-final	The Downs (Westmeath)	4-08 (20) – (22) 3-13	Tullamore (Offaly)	Mullingar
13:30 GMT (UTC+0)		(HT: 1-02 –1-08)		Venue: Cusack Park
	Pts: Luke Loughlin 0-7 (2tp, 1f), Charlie Drumm 1-0, Jonathan Lynam 1-0, Ian Martin 1-0, Lorcan Mullen 1-0, Dean Egerton 0-1	Report	Pts: Harry Plunkett 1-5 (2f), Niall Furlong 1-1, Cillian Bourke 1-0, Diarmuid Egan 0-2, Luke Plunkett 0-2, Conor Egan 0-1, John Furlong 0-1, Michael Brazil 0-1	Referee: Andrew Smith (Meath)

16 November 2025 Quarter-final	Castletown (Wexford)	0-13 (13) – (22) 2-16	Ballyboden St Enda's (Dublin)	Wexford
13:30 GMT (UTC+0)		(HT: 0-07 – 1-04)		Venue: Wexford Park
	Pts: Darragh Brooks 0-8 (4tpf), Liam Coleman 0-2, Donnacha Holmes 0-1, Brendan Halpin 0-1, Robbie Brooks 0-1	Report	Pts: Colm Basquel 1-4 (1tp), Ross McGarry 0-5, Alex Gavin 1-0, Daire Sweeney 0-3 (1f), Ryan Basquel 0-2, Ryan O'Dwyer 0-1, Callum O'Dwyer 0-1	Referee: Kevin Williamson (Offaly)

=== Semi-finals ===
29 November 2025 Semi-final	Tullamore (Offaly)	0-10 (10) – (25) 2-19	Ballyboden St Enda's (Dublin)	Tullamore
13:30 GMT (UTC+0)		(HT: 0-04 – 2-12)		Venue: O'Connor Park
	Pts: Harry Plunkett 0-5 (5f), Cillian Bourke 0-2, Niall Furlong 0-2, Luke Plunkett 0-1	Report	Pts: Daire Sweeney 0-9 (3f, 1tp), Ryan O'Dwyer 0-5, Ross McGarry 1-1, Colm Basquel 1-0 (pen), Ryan Basquel 0-3 (1f), Cein D'Arcy 0-1	Referee: Brendan Cawley (Kildare)

29 November 2025 Semi-final	Athy (Kildare)	0-19 (19) – (11) 0-11	Portarlington (Laois)	Newbridge
14:00 GMT (UTC+0)		(HT: 0-15 – 0-02)		Venue: St Conleth's Park
	Pts: Niall Kelly 0-10 (1tp, 4f), David Hyland 0-4 (2tp), Seán Moore 0-1 ('45), Kevin Feely 0-1, Conor Doyle 0-1, Ronan Kelly 0-1, Mark Hyland 0-1	Report	Pts: Colm Murphy 0-8 (3tpf, 2f), Rioghan Murphy 0-1, Darragh Slevin 0-1, Jake Foster 0-1	Referee: Andrew Smith (Meath)

=== Final ===
6 December 2025
16:30 GMT (UTC+0)
Final

Report

Athy (Kildare)	1-14 (17) – (24) 2-18	Ballyboden St Enda's (Dublin)
(HT: 0-07 – 1-07)
Pts: Kevin Feely 0-7 (1tp, 3f), Ben Purcell 1-0, Seán Moore 0-4 (1tpf, 1f), Niall Kelly 0-1 (f), Colm Moran 0-1, Ronan Kelly 0-1		Pts: Ross McGarry 0-5, Daire Sweeney 0-4 (3f), Colm Basquel 0-4 (1tp), Ryan Basquel 1-0, Patrick Dunleavy 1-0, Ryan O'Dwyer 0-2, Cein D'Arcy 0-2, Peter Healy 0-1

Croke Park, Dublin
Referee: Alan Coyne (Westmeath)

== Munster ==
Quarter-finals
Éire Óg	0-20
Rathgormack (Waterford)	1-13
Clonmel Commercials (Tipperary)	2-11
St Finbarr's (Cork)	1-17

Semi-finals
Dingle (Kerry)	2-15
Mungret St. Paul's (Limerick)	0-02
Éire Óg (Clare)	0-14
St Finbarr's (Cork)	3-20

Final
Dingle (Kerry)	1-18
St Finbarr's (Cork)	0-20

=== Quarter-finals ===
9 November 2025 Quarter-final	Éire Óg (Clare)	0-20 (20) – (16) 1-13	Rathgormack (Waterford)	Ennis
13:30 GMT (UTC+0)		(HT: 0-12 – 1-05)		Venue: Cusack Park
	Pts: Mark McInerney 0-16 (1tp, 3tpf, 4f), Dean Ryan 0-1, Darren O'Brien 0-1, Ikem Ugwueru 0-1, Luke Pyne 0-1	Report	Pts: Jason Curry 0-6 (1tp, 2f), Stephen Curry 1-1, James Power 0-2 (tp), Conor Murray 0-2, Billy Power 0-1, Seán Hahessy 0-1	Referee: David Murnane (Cork)

15 November 2025 Quarter-final	Clonmel Commercials (Tipperary)	2-11 (17) – (20) 1-17	St Finbarr's (Cork)	Clonmel
13:15 GMT (UTC+0)		(HT: 1-09 – 1-08)		Venue: Clonmel Sportsfield
	Pts: Seán O'Connor 1-05 (4f), Cian Smith 1-1, Darragh O'Connor 0-2 (tp), Jack Kennedy 0-1, Ross Peters 0-1, Michael Quinlivan 0-1	Report	Pts: Steven Sherlock 0-9 (2tpf, 1tp, 2f), Conor Dennehy 1-0, William Buckley 0-3, Ethan Twomey 0-2, Ian Maguire 0-1, Brian Hayes 0-1, Cillian Myers-Murray 0-1	Referee: Chris Maguire (Clare)

=== Semi-finals ===
23 November 2025 Semi-final	Dingle (Kerry)	2-15 (21) – (2) 0-02	Mungret St. Paul's (Limerick)	Tralee
13:00 GMT (UTC+0)		(HT: 1-08 – 0-00)		Venue: Austin Stack Park
	Pts: Conor Geaney 2-2, Niall Geaney 0-4 (1tp), Paul Geaney 0-3, Tom O'Sullivan 0-2, Dylan Geaney 0-2 (1f), Matthew Flaherty 0-1, Cathal Bambury 0-1	Report	Pts: Tom Lloyd 0-1 (f), Luke Walsh 0-1 (f)	Referee: Eoin Morrissey (Waterford)

23 November 2025 Semi-final	Éire Óg (Clare)	0-14 (14) – (29) 3-20	St Finbarr's (Cork)	Cork
15:30 GMT (UTC+0)		(HT: 0-08 – 1-10)		Venue: Páirc Uí Chaoimh
	Pts: Mark McInerney 0-10 (2tp, 1tpf, 2f), Gavin Murray 0-2, Darren Mooney 0-1, Manus Doherty 0-1	Report	Pts: Brian Hayes 3-3, Steven Sherlock 0-6 (1tp, 1f, 2'45), John Wigginton-Barrett 0-4, Ethan Twomey 0-2, Rickey Barrett 0-2, William Buckley 0-1, Enda Dennehy 0-1, Cillian Myers-Murray 0-1	Referee: Seán Lonergan (Tipperary)

=== Final ===
7 December 2025
13:30 GMT (UTC+0)
Final

Report

Dingle (Kerry)	1-18 (21) – (20) 0-20	St Finbarr's (Cork)
(HT: 1-06 – 0-14)
Pts: Dylan Geaney 0-9 (2tp, 2f), Paul Geaney 1-2, Conor Geaney 0-4 (1tpf, 1f), Tom O'Sullivan 0-2, Mark O'Connor 0-1		Pts: Steven Sherlock 0-16 (4tpf, 2tp, 1f), Brian Hayes 0-2, John Wigginton-Barrett 0-1, Luke Hannigan 0-1

Semple Stadium, Thurles
Referee: Chris Maguire (Clare)

== Ulster ==
Preliminary round

Quarter-finals

Semi-finals

Final

Kingscourt Stars (Cavan)
1–16

Erne Gaels (Fermanagh)
3–15

Erne Gaels (Fermanagh)
1–10

Kilcoo (Down)
4–12

Loughmacrory (Tyrone)
0–11

Kilcoo (Down)
0–16

Kilcoo (Down)
0–16

Scotstown (Monaghan)
0–19

Scotstown (Monaghan)
2–16

Naomh Conaill (Donegal)
0–16

Scotstown (Monaghan)
2–20 (4)

Newbridge (Derry)
2–20 (2)

Madden (Armagh)
0–12

Newbridge (Derry)
1–14

Newbridge (Derry)
0–18

Dunloy (Antrim)
0–11

=== Preliminary round ===
1 November 2025 Preliminary round	Newbridge (Derry)	1-14 (17) – (11) 0-11	Dunloy (Antrim)	Derry
18:00 GMT (UTC+0)		(HT: 0-06 – 0-08)		Venue: Celtic Park
	Pts: Óisin Doherty 0-6 (4f, 1tp), Callum McGrogan 1-0, Seán Young 0-2, Conor Doherty 0-2, Conleth McGrogan 0-2 (tp), Mark McGrogan 0-1, Mark Doherty 0-1	Report	Pts: Keelan Molloy 0-6 (2f, 1tp), Eoin O'Neill 0-1, Deaglan Smith 0-2 (tp), Ryan McGarry 0-1, Seaan Elliott 0-1	Referee: Kieran Eannetta (Tyrone)

=== Quarter-finals ===
8 November 2025 Quarter-final	Kingscourt Stars (Cavan)	1-16 (19) – (24) 3-15 (a.e.t.)	Erne Gaels (Fermanagh)	Cavan
17:30 GMT (UTC+0)		(HT: 0-03 – 3-04) (FT: 1-14 – 3-08)		Venue: Breffni Park
	Pts: Cian Shekleton 0-12 (2tp, 2f), Jordan Morris 0-4 (1tpf), Cormac Yore 1-0	Report	Pts: Odhran Johnston 1-2 (1tp), Ultan Kelm 1-1, Jack McCann 1-0, Barry McCann 0-2 (tp), Oisín Kelm 0-2 (tp), Ryan Lyons 0-2, Shane Rooney 0-2 (1f), Aogan Kelm 0-1, Thomas McCafferty 0-1 (f), Seamus Ryder 0-1 (f), Dan McCann 0-1	Referee: Enda McFeely (Donegal)

8 November 2025 Quarter-final	Loughmacrory (Tyrone)	0-11 (11) – (16) 0-16	Kilcoo (Down)	Omagh
19:15 GMT (UTC+0)		(HT: 0-05 – 0-07)		Venue: Healy Park
	Pts: Pauraic Meenagh 0-3 (1tp, 1f), Cathaoir Gallagher 0-3 (1f), Eoin McElholm 0-2, Ruairí McCullagh 0-2 (2f), Gareth Donaghy 0-1	Report	Pts: Paul Devlin 0-5 (1tp, 2f), Shealan Johnston 0-4 (1tp), Darryl Branagan 0-2, Ceilum Doherty 0-1, Ryan Johnston 0-1, Anthony Morgan 0-1, Miceal Rooney 0-1, Seán Óg McCusker 0-1	Referee: Martin McNally (Monaghan); TV: RTÉ 2

9 November 2025 Quarter-final	Scotstown (Monaghan)	2-16 (22) – (16) 0-16	Naomh Conaill (Donegal)	Clones
13:30 GMT (UTC+0)		(HT: 2-10 – 0-06)		Venue: St Tiernach's Park
	Pts: Max Maguire 0-7 (2tp), Darragh Murray 2-0, Jack McCarron 0-3, Kieran Hughes 0-2 (tp), Shane Carey 0-1, Tommy Mallen 0-1, Francis Maguire 0-1, Nicky Sherlock 0-1	Report	Pts: Shea Malone 0-6 (3tp), Eoghan McGettigan 0-5, John O'Malley 0-2 (tp), Max Campbell 0-1, Brendan McDyer 0-1, Keelan McGill 0-1	Referee: Paul Faloon (Down)

9 November 2025 Quarter-final	Madden Raparees (Armagh)	0-12 (12) – (18) 0-18	Newbridge (Derry)	Armagh
15:30 GMT (UTC+0)		(HT: 0-07 – 0-08)		Venue: Athletic Grounds
	Pts: Conor Grimley 0-8 (2f, 3tp), Donal Rafferty 0-1, Niall Smith 0-1, Paidi Comiskey 0-1, Niall Grimley 0-1	Report	Pts: Oisín Doherty 0-5 (4f), Conor McAteer 0-5, Eamon Young 0-2, Seán Young 0-2, Padraig McGrogan 0-2 (1'45), Mark McGrogan 0-1, Patrick McMullan 0-1, Shane McGrogan 0-1	Referee: Seán Hurson (Tyrone); TV: TG4

=== Semi-finals ===
22 November 2025 Semi-final	Erne Gaels (Fermanagh)	1-10 (13) – (24) 4-12	Kilcoo (Down)	Armagh
16:30 GMT (UTC+0)		(HT: 0-07 – 2-04)		Venue: Athletic Grounds
	Pts: Ryan Lyons 0-4 (2tp), Seamus Ryder 1-0, Barry McCann 0-2 (tp), Michael Óg McGarrigle 0-1, Brian Mullin 0-1, Shane Rooney 0-1 (f), Dan McCann 0-1	Report	Pts: Shealan Johnston 1-1, Ceilum Doherty 1-1, Eugene Branagan 1-1, Paul Devlin 1-1, Ryan Johnston 0-2, Anthony Morgan 0-2, Miceal Rooney 0-1, Callum Rogers 0-1, Jack Devlin 0-1, Barra McEvoy 0-1 (f)	Referee: Diarmuid Boylan (Monaghan)

23 November 2025 Semi-final	Scotstown (Monaghan)	1-04 (7) – (3) 0-03	Newbridge (Derry)	Omagh
16:00 GMT (UTC+0)		(HT: 1-04 – 0-03)		Venue: Healy Park
	Pts: Mattie Maguire 1-1, Rory Beggan 0-3 (1f, 1tpf)	Report	Pts: Seán Young 0-2, Eamon Young 0-1	Referee: Joe McQuillan (Cavan)

Match abandoned at half-time due to rain causing the pitch surface to be unplayable.

30 November 2025 Semi-final replay	Scotstown (Monaghan)	2-20 (26) – (26) 2-20 (a.e.t.) (4–2 pen)	Newbridge (Derry)	Armagh
16:00 GMT (UTC+0)		(HT: 1-13 – 1-04) (FT: 2-16 – 2-16)		Venue: Athletic Grounds
	Pts: Michéal McCarville 1-3 (1tp), Tommy Mallen 1-2, Rory Beggan 0-4 (1tp, 1tpf), Mattie Maguire 0-3 (1tp), Francis Maguire 0-3, Jack McCarron 0-2 (1f), Darren Hughes 0-2, Shane Carey 0-1	Report	Pts: Oisín Doherty 0-6 (2tp), Conor McAteer 0-4 (1tp), Seán Young 0-4 (1tp), Conor Doherty 1-0, Patrick McMullan 1-0, Conleth McGrogan 0-2 (tp), Eamon Young 0-2 (1f), Callum McGrogan 0-1, Odhran McGlone 0-1	Referee: Joe McQuillan (Cavan); TV: TG4 App
		Penalty shootout
	Rory Beggan; Jack McCarron; Kieran Hughes; Darren Hughes		Conor McAteer; Oisin Doherty; Conor Doherty; Sean Young

=== Final ===
TG4

13 December 2025
18:15 GMT (UTC+0)
Final

Report

Kilcoo (Down)	0-16 (16) – (19) 0-19 (a.e.t.)	Scotstown (Monaghan)
(HT: 0-01 – 0-06) (FT: 0-12 – 0-12)
Pts: Paul Devlin 0-8 (2tpf, 3f), Seán Óg McCusker 0-3 (1tp), Niall Kane 0-2 (tpf), Eugene Branagan 0-1, Aaron Morgan 0-1, Callum Rogers 0-1		Pts: Rory Beggan 0-11 (4tpf, 2'45, 1f), Conor McCarthy 0-3 (1tp), Mattie Maguire 0-2, Kieran Hughes 0-2, Ryan O'Toole 0-1

Athletic Grounds, Armagh
Referee: Seán Hurson (Tyrone)

== All-Ireland ==
=== Semi-finals ===
3 January 2026 Semi final	Ballyboden St Enda's (Dublin)	1-24 (27) – (29) 1-26 (a.e.t.)	Dingle (Kerry)	Cork
15:30 GMT (UTC+0)		(HT: 0-14 – 0-05) (FT: 1-20 – 1-20)		Venue: Páirc Uí Chaoimh
	Pts: Ryan O'Dwyer 0-7 (1tp), Colm Basquel 1-2, Daire Sweeney 0-5 (1tpf), Ross McGarry 0-4, Patrick Warren 0-3, Ryan Basquel 0-2, Brian Bobbett 0-1	Report	Pts: Paul Geaney 0-8 (1tpf, 1tp, 2f), Tom O'Sullivan 0-6 (1tp), Tadhg Browne 1-1, Dylan Geaney 0-4 (1f), Conor Geaney 0-2, Matthew Flaherty 0-2, Mark O'Connor 0-1, Niall Geaney 0-1, Mikey Geaney 0-1	Referee: Fergal Kelly (Longford); TV: TG4

4 January 2026 Semi final	St Brigid's (Roscommon)	1-16 (19) – (15) 1-12	Scotstown (Monaghan)	Cavan
15:30 GMT (UTC+0)		(HT: 1-10 – 1-06)		Venue: Breffni Park
	Pts: Bobby Nugent 0-7 (1tpf, 1tp, 3f), Brian Derwin 1-0, Conor Hand 0-2 (tp), Paul McGrath 0-2, Ruaidhrí Fallon 0-1, Ben O'Carroll 0-1, Ciarán Sugrue 0-1, Eddie Nolan 0-1, Charlie O'Carroll 0-1	Report	Pts: Jack McCarron 1-3 (1f), Francis Maguire 0-3 (1tp), Micheál McCarville 0-2, Rory Beggan 0-1 ('45), Max Maguire 0-1, Nicky Sherlock 0-1, Shane Carey 0-1 (f)	Referee: Brendan Cawley (Kildare); TV: TG4

=== Final ===
TG4

18 January 2026
15:40 GMT (UTC+0)
Final

Report

Dingle (Kerry)	0-23 (23) – (22) 1-19 (a.e.t.)	St Brigid's (Roscommon)
(HT: 0-07 – 0-09) (FT: 0-17 – 1-14)
Pts: Dylan Geaney 0-6 (1tp), Tom O'Sullivan 0-5, Tadhg Browne 0-3, Paul Geaney 0-3 (1f), Mark O'Connor 0-2 (tp), Conor Flaherty 0-2 (tp), Mikey Geaney 0-1, Conor Geaney 0-1 (f)		Pts: Ruaidhrí Fallon 1-6 (2tp), Shane Cunnane 0-5 (1tp, 1'45), Conor Hand 0-3, Bobby Nugent 0-2 (1f), Brian Stack 0-1, Ben O'Carroll 0-1, Charlie O'Carroll 0-1

Croke Park, Dublin
Referee: Martin McNally (Monaghan)

== Bracket ==
Semi-finals		Final
Ballyboden St Enda's (Dublin)	1-24 (27)
Dingle (Kerry)	(29) 1-26	Dingle (Kerry)	0-23 (23)
St Brigid's (Roscommon)	1-16 (19)	St Brigid's (Roscommon)	(22) 1-19
Scotstown (Monaghan)	(15) 1-12

== Statistics ==
=== Top scorers ===
Rank	Player	Club	Tally	Total	Matches	Average
1	Steven Sherlock	St Finbarr's	0-31	31	3	10.33
2	Dessie Conneely	Moycullen	1-25	28	3	9.33
3	Mark McInerney	Éire Óg	0-27	27	2	13.5
4	Paul Geaney	Dingle	0-23	23	3	7.67
5	Dylan Geaney	Dingle	0-22	22	3	7.33
6	Conor Hand	St Brigid's	0-20	20	3	6.67
7	Rory Beggan	Scotstown	0-19	19	3	6.33
8	Max Maguire	Scotstown	0-18	18	3	6
9	Shealan Johnston	Kilcoo	1-11	14	3	4.67
10	Ryan O'Dwyer	Ballyboden St Enda's	0-14	14	2	7

== See also ==
- 2025–26 All-Ireland Senior Club Hurling Championship
