= 2016 Monaghan Senior Football Championship =

Monaghan SFC
- Season: 2016
- Champions: Scotstown
- Relegated: Carrickmacross Emmets (9th in S.F.L.); Doohamlet O'Neills (10th in S.F.L.)
- Ulster SCFC: Scotstown
- All Ireland SCFC: n/a
- Winning Captain: Donal Morgan (Scotstown)
- Man of the Match: Orin Heaphey (Scotstown)

The 2016 Monaghan Senior Football Championship was the 110th edition of Monaghan GAA's premier gaelic football tournament for senior clubs in County Monaghan, Ireland. Ten teams competed, with the winners representing Monaghan in the Ulster Senior Club Football Championship. The championship begins with a back door system for the first two rounds before becoming knock-out.

Scotstown were the defending champions after they defeated Monaghan Harps in the 2015 final, and they successfully defended their title and also claimed a "2-in-a-row" of S.F.C. titles when they defeated Clontibret O'Neills 2–13 to 1–12 in Castleblayney on 2 October 2016.

Doohamlet O'Neills' returned to the senior grade after a 1-year absence since being relegated in 2011. Carrickmacross Emmets returned to the top flight since relegation in 2013 after winning the Intermediate Football League. However both of these clubs were relegated straight back to the Intermediate grade at the end of the season when finishing 10th and 9th in the S.F.L. respectively. They were replaced in 2017 by I.F.C. champions Donaghmoyne and I.F.L. champions Killanny.

== Promoted to SFC from IFC in 2015 ==
- Doohamlet O'Neills – (I.F.C. Champions)
- Carrickmacross Emmet's – (I.F.L. Champions)

== Relegated from SFC to IFC in 2015 ==
- Inniskeen Grattan's (9th in S.F.L.)
- Donaghmoyne Fontenoys (10th in S.F.L.)

== Preliminary round ==
The two teams promoted from the previous years I.F.C. play against two of the remaining 8 senior clubs in a random draw. The 2 winners proceed to Round 1A while the 2 losers proceed to Round 1B (unless they receive a bye into Round 2B).

- Latton O'Rahillys 3-14, 0-11 Carrickmacross Emmets, Castleblayney, 15/5/2016,
- Scotstown 1-20, 1-7 Doohamlet O'Neills, Castlebalyney, 15/5/2016,

== Round 1 ==
=== Round 1A ===
The 6 teams which received byes in the preliminary round play each other and the 2 Preliminary Round winners play each other. The 4 winners proceed to Round 2A while the 4 losers must play in Round 1B against the 2 losers from the Preliminary Round, however 2 of these teams will receive byes to Round 2B.

- Magheracloone Mitchell's 1-19, 0-11 Monaghan Harps, Aughnamullen, 14/5/2016,
- Ballybay Pearse Brothers 1-13, 1-12 Clontibret O'Neills, Scotstown, 15/5/2016,
- Truagh Gaels 2-16, 0-11 Castleblayney Faughs, Scotstown, 15/5/2016,
- Latton O'Rahilly's 1-14, 0-13 Scotstown, Castleblayney, 14/8/2016,

=== Round 1B ===
The 2 losers from the Preliminary Round play against 2 of the 3 losers from the matches involving teams which received byes past the Preliminary Round (determined by draw). The 2 winners proceed to Round 2B while the 2 losers exit the championship.

- Monaghan Harps 1-10, 0-12 Castleblayney Faughs, Scotstown, 13/8/2016,
- Clontibret O'Neills 1-13, 0-10 Doohamlet O'Neills, Scotstown, 13/8/2016,

== Round 2 ==
=== Round 2A ===
The 4 winners from Round 1A play each other. The 2 winners proceed to the semi-finals while the losers must play in Round 3.

- Ballybay Pearse Brothers 2-15, Truagh Gaels 0–4, Clontibret, 21/8/2016,
- Magheracloone Mitchell's 0-18, Latton O'Rahillys 1–13, Clontibret, 21/8/2016,

=== Round 2B ===
The 2 winners from Round 1B play and the 2 teams who received byes through Round 1B play in this round. The 2 winners proceed to Round 3 while the losers exit the championship.

- Scotstown 0-18, 0-12 Carrickmacross Emmets, Aughnamullen, 21/8/2016,
- Clontibret O'Neills 0-15, 0-9 Monaghan Harps, Emyvale, 21/8/2016,

== Round 3 ==
The 2 winners from Round 2B play against the 2 losers from Round 2A. The 2 winners proceed to the semi-finals while the losers exit the championship.

- Scotstown 0-15, 0-7 Truagh Gaels, Clontibret, 27/8/2016,
- Clontibret O'Neills 2-13, 1-14 Latton O'Rahillys, Castleblayney, 28/8/2016,

== Semi-finals ==
The 2 winners from Round 2A play against the 2 winners from Round 3.

- Scotstown 0-14, 1-9 Ballybay Pearse Brothers, St. Tiernach's Park, 11/9/2016,
- Clontibret O'Neills 1-12, 3-4 Magheracloone Mitchels, St. Tiernach's Park, 11/9/2016,

== Final ==
2 October 2016
4:00 pm
Final

Scotstown	2-13 – 1-12	Clontibret O'Neills
Shane Carey 0-5 (0-4f), Kieran Hughes 1-2 (0-1f), Orin Heaphey 1-1, Darren Hughes 0-3, Rory Beggan (0-1f), Sean Mohan 0-1 each	Report	Conor McManus 0-11 (0-8f), Paraic Boyle 1-0, Vincent Coery 0-1

St. Mary's Park, Castleblayney
Referee: Seán Gilsenan (Donaghmoyne Fontenoys)
