= 2015 Monaghan Senior Football Championship =

Gaelic football tournament

Monaghan S.F.C.
- Season: 2015
- Champions: Scotstown; 16th Senior Championship Title
- Relegated: Donaghmoyne Fontenoys (10th SFL); Inniskeen Grattans (9th SFL)
- Ulster SCFC: Scotstown
- All Ireland SCFC: n/a

The 2015 Monaghan Senior Football Championship is the 109th edition of the Monaghan GAA's premier club Gaelic football tournament for senior graded teams in County Monaghan, Ireland. The tournament consists of 10 teams, with the winner going on to represent Monaghan in the Ulster Senior Club Football Championship. The championship comprises a knock-out format with a back door system for the first two rounds.

Clontibret O'Neills were the defending champions after they defeated Scotstown in the previous years final, but they lost their crown to Monaghan Harps at the semi-final stage.

This was Inniskeen Grattans' return to the senior grade after a 3-year absence since being relegated in 2011 and they were relegated back to the I.F.C. after just one year in the senior grade, along with Donaghmoyne Fontenoys who also spent just one year in the top flight.

Scotstown defeated Monaghan harps to claim their 16th S.F.C. title with a 2-12 to 0-9 win in St. Tiernach's Park in Clones. Hence, they reclaimed their crown for the first time since 2013.

== Team changes ==
The following teams have changed division since the 2014 championship season.

=== To S.F.C. ===
Promoted from I.F.C.

- Inniskeen Grattan's – (I.F.C. Champions)
- Donaghmoyne Fontenoys – (I.F.L. Champions)

=== From S.F.C. ===
Relegated to I.F.C.

- Currin (9th in S.F.L.)
- Doohamlet O'Neills (10th in S.F.L.)

== Preliminary round ==
- Scotstown 1-14, 0-9 Inniskeen Grattans, Castleblayney, 22/8/2015,
- Truagh Gaels 0-14, 0-5 Donaghmoyne Fontenoys, Castleblayney, 22/8/2015,

== Round 1 ==
=== Round 1A ===
- Monaghan Harps 1-16, 1-4 Castleblayney Faughs, Truagh, 23/8/2015,
- Ballybay Pearse Brothers 1-10, 0-11 Latton O'Rahillys, Inniskeen, 23/8/2015,
- Clontibret O'Neills 2-8, 0-10 Magheracloone Mitchell's, Inniskeen, 23/8/2015,
- Scotstown 1-13, 0-9 Truagh Gaels, Emyvale, 30/8/2015,

=== Round 1B ===
- Magheracloone Mitchell's 1-13, 0-9 Inniskeen Grattans, Drumhowan, 30/8/2015,
- Castleblayney Faughs 2-16, 2-8 Donaghmoyne Fontenoys, Clontibret, 30/8/2015,

== Round 2 ==
=== Round 2A ===
- Clontibret O'Neills 2-9, 0-15 Ballybay Pearse Brothers, Castleblayney, 5/9/2015,
- Scotstown 2-15, 0-12 Monaghan Harps, Truagh, 6/9/2015,
- Clontobret O'Neills 1-15, 2-12 Ballybay Pearse Brothers, Scotstown, 12/9/2015, (Replay)
- Clontibret O'Neills 1-5, 0-6 Ballybay Pearse Brothers, Inniskeen, 18/9/2015, (2nd Replay)

=== Round 2B ===
- Castlebalyney Faughs 2-11, 0-6 Truagh Gaels, Emyvale, 5/9/2015,
- Magheracloone Mitchell's 1-11, 1-11 Latton O'Rahilly's, Inniskeen, 5/9/2015,
- Magheracloone Mitchell's 0-11, 0-11 Latton O'Rahilly's, Inniskeen, 11/9/2015, (Replay)
- Magheracloone Mitchell's 2-15, 1-17 Latton O'Rahilly's, Castleblayney, 19/9/2015, (2nd Replay)

== Round 3 ==
- Castleblayney Faughs 1-14, 1-10 Ballybay Pearse Brothers, Scotstown, 26/9/2015,
- Monaghan Harps 2-12, 0-14 Magheracloone Mitchell's, Scotstown, 26/9/2015,

== Semi-finals ==
- Scotstown 1-14, 1-8 Castleblayney Faughs, Clontibret, 3/9/2015,
- Monaghan Harps 2-12, 1-10 Clontibret O'Neills, Scotstown, 4/9/2015,

== Final ==
18 October 2015
4:00 pm
Final

Scotstown	2-12 – 0-9	Monaghan Harps
Orin Heaphey 1-2, Conor McCarthy 1-2, Darren Hughes, Dermot McCrudden, Rory Beggan (1 '45) 0-2 each, Kieran Hughes and Shane Carey (0-1f) 0-1 each		Gary White 0-3, Shane Smyth 0-2, Neil McAdam 0-2 (0-1f), Donal Hahessy and Fergal McMahon (0-1f each)

St. Tiernach's Park, Clones
