= Tirnaneill =

Tirnaneill Tír Ní Néill
- Town
- Location in Ireland
- Coordinates: 54°17′12″N 6°57′59″W
- Country: Ireland
- Province: Ulster
- County: Monaghan
- Time zone: UTC+0 (WET)
  - Summer (DST): UTC-1 (IST (WEST))

Tirnaneill (Irish: Tír Ní Néill, meaning 'O'Neill's land') is a townland situated in north County Monaghan in Ireland, about halfway between Emyvale and Monaghan Town at a crossroads on the N2 road known as Tirnaneill Cross.
