= Truagh Gaels GAC =

Truagh Gaels
- Gaeil Triúcha CLG
- Founded: 1958
- County: Monaghan
- Colours: Red and Black
- Grounds: St Mellan's Park, Lisseagh, Emyvale

Playing kits
Standard colours

Senior Club Championships
| | All Ireland | Ulster champions | Monaghan champions |
|---|---|---|---|
| Football: | - | - | - |
| Hurling: | - | - | - |

Truagh Gaels is a Gaelic Athletic Association club located near the village of Emyvale, County Monaghan, Ireland.

== History ==
The club was founded in 1958. Truagh reached the final of the Monaghan Senior Football Championship in 2000 and 2001, losing to Castleblayney Faughs on both occasions.

Truagh claimed the Monaghan Intermediate title in 2013 by beating Tyholland in the final. They followed this up with wins over Drumgath and Foreglen to reach the Ulster final. Truagh then beat Tyrone champions Eskra in the final on 1 December 2013 to claim the Ulster Intermediate Club Football Championship for the first time. Truagh then got over Leinster champions Geraldines to reach the All-Ireland final. On 9 February 2014, Truagh faced Kiltane at Croke Park for the All-Ireland Intermediate Club Football Championship. Truagh secured the All-Ireland title with an eight-point victory.

Truagh reached the county final for the third time in 2021, but lost once again, this time to Scotstown.

== Honours ==
- Monaghan Senior Football Championship (0):
  - Runners Up 2000, 2001, 2021
- All-Ireland Intermediate Club Football Championship (1): 2013–14
- Ulster Intermediate Club Football Championship (1): 2013
- Monaghan Intermediate Football Championship (1): 2013
- Monaghan Junior Football Championship (1): 1971
