= Gerry McCarville =

Irish Gaelic footballer

Gerry McCarville (born 1955/1956) is an Irish Gaelic football selector and former player for the Monaghan county team. From Tydavnet, he played his club football for Scotstown.

McCarville made his inter-county debut in 1977, in a National League match against Westmeath. As an inter-county player, he won the 1984–85 National Football League. He also won three Ulster Senior Football Championship titles. For the first, in 1979, he was at midfield; for the second, in 1985, he was at full-back, while the third title came in 1988.

With his club, McCarville won fourteen Monaghan Senior Football Championship titles, twelve Senior Football League titles and three Ulster Senior Club Football Championship titles. With Ulster he won several Railway Cups and represented the province against Australia in early versions of international rules football.

McCarville served as a selector from the beginning of Séamus McEnaney's first spell as Monaghan senior manager in 2004. However, McEnaney parted ways with him ahead of the 2007 season.

He was inducted into the Monaghan GAA Hall of Fame in 2017.
