= Rory Beggan =

Monaghan Gaelic footballer

Personal information
- Born: 11 April 1992 Scotstown, County Monaghan, Ireland

Sport
- Sport: Gaelic Football
- Position: Goalkeeper
Club
- Years: Club
- 2011–: Scotstown
Club titles
- Monaghan titles: 8
Inter-county*
Years	County	Apps (scores)
2011-Present	Monaghan	57 (0-69)
Inter-county titles
- Ulster titles: 2
- All Stars: 1
- *Inter County team apps and scores correct as of match played 22 June 2024.

Rory Beggan is an Irish Gaelic footballer for the Monaghan county team. Beggan won an All-Star award in November 2018. In January 2024, Beggan began training in American football as part of the NFL.

== History ==
Beggan plays his club Gaelic football for Scotstown GAA. Beggan was first called up to play inter-county football for Monaghan in 2011 by Eamon McEneaney. Whilst playing county football, he gained a reputation as a goalkeeper with a long kick and was able to score points from inside his own half. Later he was designated as Monaghan's free kick taker. Keen to practice his free kicks, in 2018 he disguised himself as a member of the backroom team in order to get more practice time with Queen's University Belfast's minors team in Northern Ireland.

Between 2011 and 2018, he had scored 0-43 points, the joint highest for a goalkeeper. Beggan's style of play has been viewed as an evolution of the goalkeeper position being more involved in attacking and scoring moves as ten years prior to 2019, there had been no points scored by any goalkeeper in All-Ireland competition. In 2018, he was named as an All-Ireland All-Star, despite missing a last minute scoring attempt against Tyrone in the 2018 All-Ireland Senior Football Championship semi-finals. He was invited to travel to Philadelphia with the rest of the All-Stars but declined in favour of playing for Scotstown in their Ulster Senior Club Football Championship semi-final.

In January 2024, Beggan began training in American football as part of the NFL's International Player Pathway Program.

== Career statistics ==
As of match played 15 July 2023

Team	Year	National League			Ulster		All-Ireland		Total	
Team	Year	Division	Apps	Score	Apps	Score	Apps	Score	Apps	Score
Monaghan	2011				-		-		-	
Monaghan	2012	Division 2			-		-		-	
Monaghan	2013	Division 1			3	0-02	1	0-00	4	0-02
Monaghan	2014	Division 1			4	0-11	2	0-01	6	0-12
Monaghan	2015	Division 1			3	0-01	1	0-00	4	0-01
Monaghan	2016				3	0-03	1	0-01	4	0-04
Monaghan	2017				3	0-03	4	0-02	7	0-05
Monaghan	2018				2	0-04	7	0-14	9	0-18
Monaghan	2019				1	0-02	2	0-03	3	0-05
Monaghan	2020				1	0-01	-		1	0-01
Monaghan	2021				3	0-05	-		3	0-05
Monaghan	2022				2	0-02	1	0-00	3	0-02
Monaghan	2023				2	0-02	6	0-07	8	0-09
Career total					27	0-36	25	0-28	52	0-64

== Honours ==
- All Star (1): 2018
- Ulster Senior Football Championship: 2013, 2015
- Ulster Senior Club Football Championship:
  - 2025
  - Runner-up: 2015, 2018
- Monaghan Senior Football Championship (11):
  - 2013, 2015, 2016, 2017, 2018, 2020, 2021, 2023, 2024, 2025, 2026
