= 2013–14 All-Ireland Intermediate Club Football Championship =

Irish Gaelic football competition

- Sponsor: Allied Irish Bank
- Champions: Truagh Gaels (1st title); Páuric Treanor (captain)
- Runners-up: Kiltane; Patrick Joe Gaughan (captain)

The 2013–14 All-Ireland Intermediate Club Football Championship was the 11th staging of the All-Ireland Intermediate Club Football Championship since its establishment by the Gaelic Athletic Association for the 2003–04 season.

The All-Ireland final was played on 9 February 2014 at Croke Park in Dublin, between Truagh Gaels and Kiltane. Truagh Gaels won the match by 2-21 o 2-13 to claim their first ever championship title.

== All-Ireland Intermediate Club Football Championship ==
=== All-Ireland semi-finals ===
26 January 2013 Semi-final	Kiltane	2-09 - 0-09	Clyda Rovers	Duggan Park
	U Corrigan (1-2, 0-2 frees); S Lindsay (1-1); E Barrett (0-2, 0-1 free); D Carey (0-1 ‘45), J Reilly (0-1 free), J Healy, T Gaughan (0-1 each).	Report	P Kissane (0-2, 0-1 pen); C Flanagan (0-2, 0-2 frees); J Murphy (0-1 free), C O’Sullivan, P O’Mullane, S Roynane, S O’Connell (0-1 each).

26 January 2013 Semi-final	Truagh Gaels	2-10 - 1-09	Geraldines	St Oliver Plunkett Park
	M Counihan, D Finnegan 1-2 each, D McKenna 0-4 (2f), C McKenna 0-2 (2f).	Report	J McEneaney 0-5 (3f, 1 45), N Mackin 1-0, J Arrowsmith0-2, G Hoey, S O’Hanlon 0-1 each.

=== All-Ireland final ===
9 February 2014 Final	Truagh Gaels	2-21 - 2-13	Kiltane	Croke Park
	D McKenna 1-7, A Treanor 0-4, P McKenna 0-4 (1f), M Counihan 1-1, C McKenna 0-2 (1f), S McKenna 0-2, D Finnegan 0-1	Report	M Sweeney 1-1, J Healy 0-3 (1 ‘45’), D Carey 1-0, (pen), E Barrett 0-3 (1f), U Corrigan, S Lindsay 0-2 each, S Gaughan, J Reilly 0-1 each
