= Dermot Malone =

Monaghan Gaelic footballer

Personal information
- Born: Blackhill

Sport
- Sport: Gaelic football
Club
- Years: Club
- Blackhill Castleblayney Faughs

Dermot Malone is a former Irish Gaelic footballer, formerly for Monaghan county football team and Castleblayney Faughs. He is now a sales executive.

== Career ==
Malone is from Blackhill. He played for the Monaghan Under U14s and U21s, and debuted in the senior Monaghan team in 2010.

Malone played in the Monaghan Ulster Senior final wins in both 2013 and 2015. He was the man of the match when Monaghan defeated Galway at the end of the Super 8s in 2018, taking the team to the All Ireland Semi Final against Tyrone. He put in his last appearance for Monaghan in the 2022 Ulster Senior final loss to Tyrone at Croke Park.

He retired from inter-county football due to injury in January 2022. In September 2022, he was selected as a minor manager for Monaghan.
