= Monaghan Senior Football Championship =

Annual Gaelic football competition

- Current season or competition: 2026 Monaghan Senior Football Championship
- Code: Gaelic football
- Founded: 1888
- Region: Monaghan (GAA)
- Trophy: Mick Duffy Cup
- No. of teams: 10
- Title holders: Scotstown (25th title)
- Most titles: Castleblayney Faughs (37 titles)
- Sponsors: Greenfield Foods
- Official website: Monaghan GAA

The Monaghan Senior Football Championship is an annual Gaelic football competition contested by Monaghan GAA clubs. The Monaghan County Board of the Gaelic Athletic Association has organised it since 1888.

Scotstown are the title holders (2026), having defeated Truagh Gaels in the final.

== Honours ==
The trophy presented to the winners is the Mick Duffy Cup. The winners of the Monaghan Senior Championship qualify to represent the county in the Ulster Senior Club Football Championship. The winners can, in turn, go on to play in the All-Ireland Senior Club Football Championship.

== List of finals ==
(r) = replay

Year	Winner	Score	Opponent	Score
1888	Inniskeen Grattans		Carrickmacross	
1889	No competition			
1890	No competition			
1891	No competition			
1892	No competition			
1893	No competition			
1894	No competition			
1895	No competition			
1896	No competition			
1897	No competition			
1898	No competition			
1899	No competition			
1900	No competition			
1901	No competition			
1902	No competition			
1903	No competition			
1904	Donaghmoyne Fontenoys		Inniskeen Grattans	
1905	Inniskeen Grattans		Donaghmoyne Fontenoys	
1906	Donaghmoyne Fontenoys		Carrickmacross	
1907	Castleblayney Faughs		Monaghan Harps	
1908	Carrickmacross		Inniskeen Grattans	
1909	Carrickmacross		Currin	
1910	Carrickmacross		Monaghan Harps	
1911	Monaghan Harps		Greenan's Cross	
1912	No competition			
1913	Carrickmacross		Ture	
1914	Carrickmacross		Magheramey	
1915	Magheramey		Castleblayney Faughs	
1916	Castleblayney Faughs		Clones	
1917	Castleblayney Faughs		Clontibret O'Neills	
1918	Carrickmacross		Clontibret O'Neills	
1919	Carrickmacross	1-05	Clontibret O'Neills	0-00
1920	No competition			
1921	No competition			
1922	Monaghan Harps	2-04	Ballybay Pearse Brothers	0-03
1923	Monaghan Harps		Castleblayney Faughs	
1924	Castleblayney Faughs		Clones	
1925	North Selection		South Selected	
1926	Castleblayney Faughs		Clones	
1927	Kileevan Sarsfields		Castleblayney Faughs	
1928	Corcaghan Gaels		Carrickmacross	
1929	Kileevan Sarsfields		Killanny	
1930	Latton O'Rahilly's		Inniskeen Grattans	
1931	Castleblayney Faughs	3-04	Kileevan Sarsfields	0-02
1932	Castleblayney Faughs		Kileevan Sarsfields	
1933	Castleblayney Faughs		Inniskeen Fane Rovers	
1934	Donaghmoyne Fontenoys		Carrickmacross	
1935	Donaghmoyne Fontenoys		Castleblayney Faughs	
1936	Castleblayney Faughs		Donaghmoyne Fontenoys	
1937	Castleblayney Faughs		Donaghmoyne Fontenoys	
1938	Inniskeen Grattans	0-06	Kileevan Sarsfields	1-02
1939	Castleblayney Faughs		Donaghmoyne Fontenoys	
1940	Castleblayney Faughs		Inniskeen Grattans	
1941	Castleblayney Faughs		Donaghmoyne Fontenoys	
1942	Donaghmoyne Fontenoys		Clones St Tierney's	
1943	Clones St Tierney's		Inniskeen Grattans	
1944	Kileevan Sarsfields		Castleblayney Faughs	
1945	Donaghmoyne Fontenoys		Clones St Tierney's	
1946	Castleblayney Faughs		Killanny Geraldines	
1947	Inniskeen Grattans		Castleblayney Faughs	
1948	Inniskeen Grattans	3-04	Castleblayney Faughs	1-03
1949	Clontibret O'Neills	0-11	Carrickmacross	2-03
1950	Clontibret O'Neills	2-11	Killanny Geraldines	1-02
1951	Clontibret O'Neills	5-07	Castleblayney Faughs	0-03
1952	Clontibret O'Neills	1-06	Inniskeen Grattans	1-03
1953	Ballybay Pearse Brothers	2-08	Donaghmoyne Fontenoys	0-06
1954	Ballybay Pearse Brothers	2-09	Clontibret O'Neills	0-05
1955	Clontibret O'Neills	1-06	Ballybay Pearse Brothers	0-06
1956	Clontibret O'Neills	3-08	Ballybay Pearse Brothers	3-06
1957	Ballybay Pearse Brothers	2-04, 1-08 (r)	Clontibret O'Neills	1-07, 0-04 (r)
1958	Clontibret O'Neills	0-07	Donaghmoyne Fontenoys	0-04
1959	Ballybay Pearse Brothers	2-04, 3-07 (r)	Clontibret O'Neills	1-07, 0-05 (r)
1960	Scotstown	1-05	Castleblayney Faughs	1-03
1961	Scotstown	1-10	Castleblayney Faughs	2-00
1962	Ballybay Pearse Brothers	1-10	Castleblayney Faughs	1-07
1963	Castleblayney Faughs	2-06 (D); 0-05 (R)	Ballybay Pearse Brothers	3-03 (D); 0-03 (R)
1964	Castleblayney Faughs	1-09	Scotstown	1-04
1965	Castleblayney Faughs	1-05	Clontibret O'Neills	0-03
1966	Castleblayney Faughs	0-06	Scotstown	0-03
1967	Castleblayney Faughs	2-09	Clontibret O'Neills	1-10
1968	Clontibret O'Neills	1-06	Scotstown	0-08
1969	Ballybay Pearse Brothers	3-05	Castleblayney Faughs	0-05
1970	Castleblayney Faughs	1-10	Clontibret O'Neills	0-09
1971	Castleblayney Faughs	1-10	Clontibret O'Neills	2-04
1972	Castleblayney Faughs	2-14	Ballybay Pearse Brothers	2-08
1973	Castleblayney Faughs	3-08	Ballybay Pearse Brothers	3-05
1974	Scotstown	1-10	Castleblayney Faughs	0-08
1975	Castleblayney Faughs	2-10	Scotstown	2-05
1976	Castleblayney Faughs	0-06, 0-09 (r)	Ballybay Pearse Brothers	1-03, 0-05 (r)
1977	Scotstown	0-05, 2-07 (r)	Ballybay Pearse Brothers	0-05, 1-04 (r)
1978	Scotstown	1-08	Castleblayney Faughs	1-03
1979	Scotstown	2-04	Castleblayney Faughs	1-04
1980	Scotstown	0-09 (D) 0-10 (R)	Monaghan Harps	0-09 (D) 1-05 (R)
1981	Scotstown	0-10 (D) 1-14 (R)	Castleblayney Faughs	1-07 (D) 1-08 (R)
1982	Castleblayney Faughs	0-10	Ballybay Pearse Brothers	0-07
1983	Scotstown	3-04	Ballybay Pearse Brothers	0-10
1984	Scotstown	0-11	Inniskeen Grattans	0-04
1985	Scotstown	3-06	Castleblayney Faughs	0-11
1986	Castleblayney Faughs	2-11	Emyvale	0-05
1987	Ballybay Pearse Brothers	0-09 (D), 0-08 (R)	Monaghan Harps	0-04 (D), 0-08 (R)
1988	Castleblayney Faughs	3-10	Clontibret O'Neills	0-07
1989	Scotstown		Castleblayney Faughs	
1990	Castleblayney Faughs		Inniskeen Grattans	
1991	Castleblayney Faughs		Monaghan Harps	
1992	Scotstown		Castleblayney Faughs	
1993	Scotstown	0-09	Clontibret O'Neills	1-05
1994	Clontibret O'Neills	4-07	Donaghmoyne Fontenoys	1-11
1995	Castleblayney Faughs	0-14, 0-11 (r)	Clontibret O'Neills	1-11, 0-08 (r)
1996	Castleblayney Faughs		Latton O'Rahillys	
1997	Clontibret O'Neills	0-11	Castleblayney Faughs	0-08
1998	Castleblayney Faughs	0-14	Clontibret O'Neills	1-07
1999	Castleblayney Faughs		Carrickmacross	
2000	Castleblayney Faughs		Truagh Gaels	
2001	Castleblayney Faughs	0-12	Truagh Gaels	0-07
2002	Clontibret O'Neills	0-13, 0-16 (r)	Magheracloone Mitchells	2-07, 2-09 (r)
2003	Castleblayney Faughs	3-10	Latton O'Rahillys	0-06
2004	Magheracloone Mitchells	1-10	Scotstown	0-05
2005	Latton O'Rahillys	0-14	Magheracloone Mitchells	0-10
2006	Clontibret O'Neills	1-08	Magheracloone Mitchells	0-08
2007	Clontibret O'Neills	1-10	Castleblayney Faughs	0-10
2008	Latton O'Rahillys	0-15	Carrickmacross	0-11
2009	Clontibret O'Neills	2-13	Latton O'Rahillys	0-09
2010	Clontibret O'Neills	1-10, 1-11 (r)	Magheracloone Mitchells	1-10, 0-12 (r)
2011	Latton O'Rahilly's	1-06	Scotstown	0-08
2012	Ballybay Pearse Brothers	1-12	Clontibret O'Neills	2-05
2013	Scotstown	2-16	Clontibret O'Neills	0-07
2014	Clontibret O'Neills	1-10	Scotstown	1-09
2015	Scotstown	2-12	Monaghan Harps	0-09
2016	Scotstown	2-13	Clontibret O'Neills	1-12
2017	Scotstown	2-17	Magheracloone Mitchells	0-13
2018	Scotstown	1-12	Ballybay Pearse Brothers	0-13
2019	Clontibret O'Neills	1-14	Scotstown	0-11
2020	Scotstown	1-14	Ballybay Pearse Brothers	0-07
2021	Scotstown	1-13	Truagh Gaels	0-10
2022	Ballybay Pearse Brothers	1-11	Scotstown	1-08
2023	Scotstown	0-17	Inniskeen Grattans	0-14
2024	Scotstown	1-10	Clontibret O'Neills	0-08
2025	Scotstown	0-22	Inniskeen Grattans	0-17
2026	Scotstown	1-22	Truagh Gaels	0-10

== Wins listed by club ==
#	Team	Wins	Years won	Runner-up	Years runner-up
1	Castleblayney Faughs	37	1907, 1916, 1917, 1924, 1926, 1931, 1932, 1933, 1936, 1937, 1939, 1940, 1941, 1946, 1963, 1964, 1965, 1966, 1967, 1970, 1971, 1972, 1973, 1975, 1976, 1982, 1986, 1988, 1990, 1991, 1995, 1996, 1998, 1999, 2000, 2001, 2003	21	1915, 1923, 1927, 1935, 1944, 1947, 1948, 1951, 1960, 1961, 1962, 1969, 1974, 1978, 1979, 1981, 1985, 1989, 1992, 1997, 2007
2	Scotstown	25	1960, 1961, 1974, 1977, 1978, 1979, 1980, 1981, 1983, 1984, 1985, 1989, 1992, 1993, 2013, 2015, 2016, 2017, 2018, 2020, 2021, 2023, 2024, 2025, 2026	8	1964, 1966, 1968, 1975, 2004, 2011, 2014, 2019, 2022
3	Clontibret O'Neills	17	1949, 1950, 1951, 1952, 1955, 1956, 1958, 1968, 1994, 1997, 2002, 2006, 2007, 2009, 2010, 2014, 2019	17	1917, 1918, 1919, 1957, 1959, 1965, 1967, 1970, 1971, 1988, 1993, 1995, 1998, 2012, 2013, 2016, 2024
4	Ballybay Pearse Brothers	9	1953, 1954, 1957, 1959, 1962, 1969, 1987, 2012, 2022	11	1922, 1955, 1956, 1963, 1972, 1973, 1976, 1977, 1982, 1983, 2018, 2020
5	Carrickmacross	7	1908, 1909, 1910, 1913, 1914, 1918, 1919	7	1888, 1906, 1928, 1934, 1949, 1999, 2008
6	Donaghmoyne	5	1904, 1906, 1934, 1935, 1947	8	1905, 1936, 1937, 1939, 1941, 1953, 1958, 1994
6	Inniskeen Grattans	5	1888, 1905, 1939, 1947, 1948	11	1904, 1908, 1930, 1933, 1940, 1943, 1952, 1984, 1990, 2023, 2025
8	Latton O'Rahillys	4	1930, 2005, 2008, 2011	3	1996, 2003, 2009
9	Kileevan Sarsfields	3	1927, 1929, 1944	1	1938
9	Monaghan Harps	3	1911, 1922, 1923	6	1907, 1910, 1980, 1987, 1991, 2015
11	Corcaghan Gaels	1	1928	0	—N/a
11	Clones St Tiarnach’s	1	1943	5	1916, 1924, 1926, 1942, 1945
11	Magheramey	1	1915	1	1914
11	North Selection	1	1925	0	—N/a
11	Magheracloone Mitchells	1	2004	5	2002, 2005, 2006, 2010, 2017
16	Kilanny Geraldines	0	—N/a	3	1929, 1946, 1950
16	Kileevan Sarsfields	0	—N/a	3	1931, 1932, 1938
16	Truagh Gaels	0	—N/a	4	2000, 2001, 2021, 2026
16	Ture	0	—N/a	1	1913
16	South Selection	0	—N/a	1	1925
16	Currin	0	—N/a	1	1909
16	Grennans Cross	0	—N/a	1	1911
16	Emyvale	0	—N/a	1	1986
