= Magheracloone Mitchells GAC =

Monaghan-based Gaelic games club

Magheracloone Mitchells GFC
- Machaire Cluaine
- Founded: 1945
- County: Monaghan
- Nickname: Magheracloone, Mitchells
- Colours: Black and White
- Grounds: Carrickmacross-Kingscourt Road
- Coordinates: 53°56′41.59″N 6°46′11.87″W

Playing kits
Standard colours

Senior Club Championships
	All Ireland	Ulster champions	Monaghan champions
Football:	-	-	1

Magheracloone Mitchells is a Gaelic Athletic Association Gaelic football club from the parish of Magheracloone in County Monaghan, Ireland. The team participate in the Monaghan Senior Football Championship. The Magheracloone Mitchells GAA club pitch is situated on the main Carrickmacross-Kingscourt Road. On the site there are two pitches (the main pitch and a training pitch), modern changing rooms as well as a community centre and a handball alley.

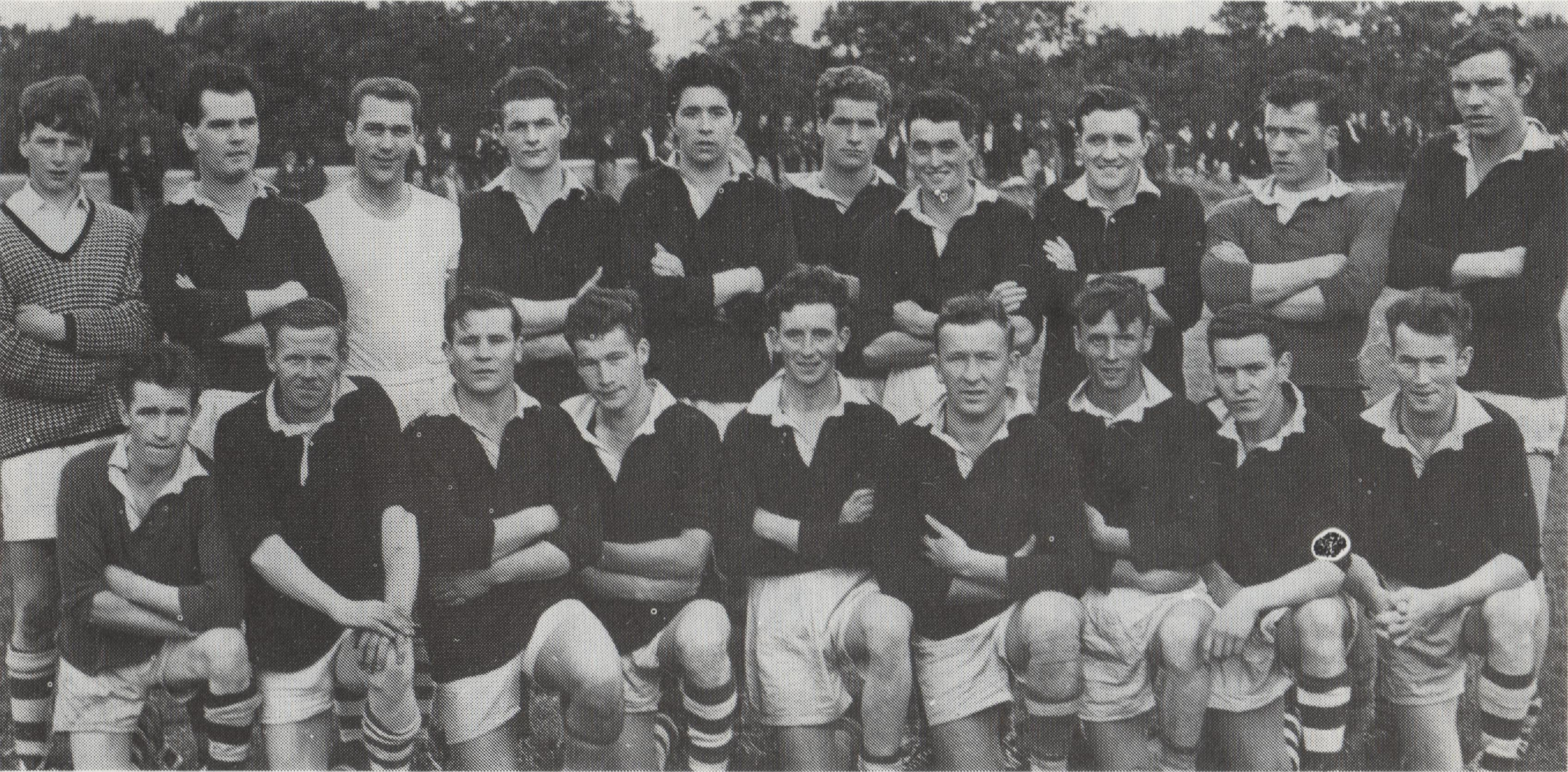
Magheracloone team of 1965

== History ==
=== 2018 collapse ===
On Monday 24 September 2018, a disused mine collapsed in the area where the club is located. An exclusion zone was set up, with the club confirming that its pitch was completely out of bounds. Social media images displayed enormous cracks in the clubhouse and the surface of the club's pitch. The club announcement stated: "Magheracloone GFC pitches, Community Centre, car park etc have been closed for the foreseeable future due to a serious incident overnight. Nobody is to enter the grounds under any circumstances." By the following day two fresh sinkholes had emerged close to the pitch, with a preliminary inspection by geologists revealing a basin of depression with a diameter of about 120 metres had been found near the GAA Clubhouse and community buildings and that two crown holes with a width of about 8 metres had come about due to settlement within that basin.

Within weeks of the disaster, Magheracloone had been relegated from the Monaghan Senior Football Championship.

In April 2020, a new six-metre crown hole in a nearby mine was discovered following an aerial survey.

It took until August 2022 for the club to be able to return to play at its ground. Clubs in Cavan, Meath and Louth supported Magheracloone during this period.

== Notable players ==
Three Monaghan team members are also inter-county Gaelic footballers; Tomás Freeman, Damien Freeman (brother of Tomás), Shane Duffy and Gavin Doogan. Magheracloone Mitchells won their first Monaghan Senior Football Championship in 2004. However, they were knocked out of that year's Ulster Senior Club Football Championship by Cavan Gaels at the quarter-final stage.

== Honours ==
- Monaghan Senior Football Championship (1)
  - 2004
- Monaghan Intermediate Football Championship (2)
  - 2019, 2024
- Ulster Intermediate Club Football Championship (1)
  - 2019
