= Carrickmacross Emmets GAC =

Monaghan-based Gaelic games club

Carrickmacross Emmets CLG
- Carraig Mhachaire Rois
- Founded: 1887
- County: Monaghan
- Nickname: The "Emmets"
- Colours: Green and Yellow
- Grounds: Emmet Park, Ballybay Road and Platinum Tanks Park Donaghmoyne Road.
- Coordinates: 53°59′07.16″N 6°43′16.89″W

Playing kits
Standard colours

Senior Club Championships
	All Ireland	Ulster champions	Monaghan champions
Football:	-	-	7
Hurling:	-	-	7

Carrickmacross Emmets is a Gaelic football club from Carrickmacross in County Monaghan in Ireland. The club was founded in 1887. The club participates in Monaghan competitions. The club has won the Monaghan Senior Football Championship eight times and have come runner-up seven times. The club colours are green and yellow. The first club grounds played on were Athletic Grounds, then the Gaelic Grounds. In 1938, the club moved to its present grounds at Emmet Park, which was developed into one of the best venues in the county. It was officially opened in 1953 when Monaghan played Meath. In later years the club secured property on the Donaghmoyne Road and developed a full size playing pitch and a training area along with changing facilities that can cater for four teams. The site is chiefly used for training purposes for adult and juvenile teams as well as ladies and hurling teams, but games are played there when necessary.

== History ==
=== Early years ===
Carrickmacross Emmets have been in existence since the 1880s. In that period, a revival in Gaelic games was underway with clubs developing up all over the county but they had no real organisation or supervision. By 1887, all counties were instructed by the Gaelic Athletic Association (itself founded in 1884) to affiliate to the governing body under the rules of the new association. The first ever Gaelic Athletic Association (GAA) meeting in Monaghan was held in O’Neills Hotel in Carrickmacross on 27 December 1887 to elect a county committee. It was attended by the Carrickmacross Sextons and the Carrickmacross O’Briens; both remnants of the original Emmets team. This split had arisen arose from a disunion within the GAA which had taken place in November 1887. The first official meeting of the new county board was also held in O'Neills Hotel in February 1888.

It was decided to hold a football championship at Capragh on 27 May 1887. The Carrickmacross Sextons reached the final of the competition but were beaten by the Inniskeen Grattans who went on to represent Monaghan in the All-Ireland championship. Later that year, the Carrickmacross Emmets made their reappearance as a team; with a challenge match against the Baileborough Raparees which was played at Shercock on 29 July with the return game being staged in a field close to Carrickmacross town on 5 August. The following year, the Sextons and the O’Briens and a team called the Farney Wanderers represented the town in the County Football Championship; however with the GAA in disarray in Monaghan; the competition was never concluded.

Next mention of the Emmets came to notice in April 1896 when they played the Aghalile Grattan’s in a challenge match and again in August when they played Virginia Sarsfields in the Killanny Tournament. In October 1896, the Emmets ran a well-attended football tournament in close proximity to the town.

In the subsequent years, games were practically non-existent and it was 1901 before we read about a football game near Carrickmacross. According to records: "The pitch wasn’t properly marked and so ended the tournament under the auspices of the Carrickmacross Gaelic club whose existence is a myth".

=== Official foundation ===
On 26 September 1903, a meeting of those interested in Gaelic games was held in the Foresters Hall, Carrickmacross to elect officers and to establish the club to the county board. It was also the centenary of the death of Robert Emmet, and it was unanimously agreed to again (re)adopt the name of the Irish patriot for the team. The officers elected at that meeting included: (Captain) Owen Sherry (Vice Captain) J Jones; (Treasurer) Joseph Connolly; (Secretary) Thomas Markey.

The following month, the new Emmets travelled to Kingscourt to play the local Sinn Féin team in a challenge match. By January 1904, the Emmets were in full swing when they played Inniskeen to a draw match; they also participated in tournaments at Killanny, Killark and Magheracloone as well as running their own tournament competition. Also in 1904, the first inter-county match to be played in many years was organised by the Cavan Foresters; it was played at the Cavan Agricultural grounds between Cavan and Monaghan; with the Emmets representing Monaghan and the Slashers representing Cavan. On 12 May 1904, a meeting of the established clubs met in the Foresters Hall to put in place foundations for a new association in Monaghan in which the Carrickmacross Emmets would play a role.

In 1908, the club won its first senior championship against Inniskeen at Athletic Grounds Carrickmacross. There were celebrations in Carrickmacross that night as the club captured their first County Championship. The final score in this match was Carrickmacross 1-03 to Inniskeen's 0-01

Having represented Monaghan in the 1908 Ulster senior championship, it looked as if Carrickmacross Emmets might not take part in the County Championship series in 1909 as they had incurred a suspension but on appeal the penalty was rescinded. The final of the County Championship between Currin and Carrickmacross Emmets was played at Foy’s Green, Cootehill on Sunday 11 April 1909. A large crowd witnessed the final. The final outcome of this one-sided final was Carrickmacross 2.12 to Currin 1.01.

=== 1910s ===
Carrick won the championship for the third year in a row on Sunday 9 October 1910 at Derrygooney, Bawn. Carrickmacross Emmets and Monaghan Harps met in the final of the football championship of the county. Both teams were at full strength and Monaghan Harps fielded the strongest team that has represented the North for some time. The final score was Carrickmacross Emmets 0.03 Monaghan Harps 0.00.

For the next three years, the club failed to win the championship Ture Davits beat Roslea in the final of the North Monaghan League (April 1914). Meanwhile, Carrickmacross won the South Monaghan championship. The county final was fixed for Creeve on Sunday 7 June 1914. Subsequently, at meeting of Monaghan County Board in Ballybay on Saturday 6 June the day before the fixture was to take place; Carrickmacross Emmets were declared the Senior County Champions. The runner-up Ture having dissolved or amalgamated with other clubs.

1914 was a strange year in Monaghan football. The eagerly awaited finals of County Monaghan football and hurling championships were played at Ballybay on Sunday 15 November. In hurling, Carrickmacross beat Clones/Monaghan 3.02 to 0.00. The unpleasant atmospheric conditions militated against the success of the fixture; but the afternoon turned out satisfactory and there was nothing to complain about in the attendance.

No time was lost in starting the football match and at 3.40 pm the teams lined out. The half time score was Carrickmacross 2.00 Magherarney 0.00. On resuming the North men having the advantage played with determination and secured a well-scored goal. The Young Irelands still attacked but were stubbornly opposed by the Emmets; some of the latter having to be severely reprimanded by the referee. The shades of night had fallen when the final whistle sounded. The final score was Carrickmacross 2.00 Magherarney 1.01. After the match was over the County Secretary got the referee’s decision which was as follows: "The Emmets have won on the score of 2.00 to 1.01 but since a player of the former stoutly refused to obey my ruling, I have no alternative but to award the match to Magherarney." The referee's report was adopted and Magherarney declared champions.

Doohamlet was the venue on Sunday (1 October 1915) for three matches; one being the Senior Football final of 1915 between Carrickmacross and Killeevan. There was a very large attendance and the weather was beautiful. Proceedings opened with a hurling match between North and South (Carrickmacross) which the South won! The big event then took place with the Emmets being represented by Downey, Cooney, Connolly, M’Califf, Gartlan, Kelly, McCaffrey, Farrell, Hand, Keelan, Farrell, Marron, Kelly. On turning over Carrickmacross assumed the upper hand and ran out winners by 1.05 to 0.02.

Application had been made for a new team in Carrickmacross in 1918. The Chairman said he thought the same could not be granted till Annual Convention. Mr Devine said he understood some of the officers of the Emmets were in the new club, although the Emmets had made no change. The Chairman advocated unity and said a town like Carrickmacross could be scarcely afford two clubs. No matter how they might differ politically, they should all join hands in the GAA. It was eventually decided that representatives from both clubs meet in the Catholic Hall to discuss the question of amalgamation for league purposes this season. The reorganised amalgamation went on to win the Senior Football Championship.

The 1919 Monaghan County Final was played at Ballybay on Sunday 26 October. Favoured with a fine day it is estimated that over two-thousand people attended from Armagh, Louth, Fermanagh, Cavan and Monaghan. It was 4.30pm when Rev W P O’Brien CC Ballybay threw in the ball! Carrickmacross at once broke away and the Clontibret O'Neills backs were tested. Clinton cleared and play was dull for fifteen minutes. There were slight fouls and the uneven surface left the ball out of play time and again! When J Marron shot a point for Carrickmacross the game became exciting and the Farney men showed their superiority by scoring two-points before half-time. During half-time the Carrickmacross Band played a victory march. On resuming Clontibret were mainly on the defensive and their team was badly placed, the forwards going back to help the defence! The Emmets scored a goal per Carragher and two points were registered by them towards the close. The final score was Carrickmacross 1.05 Clontibret 0.00.

== Notable players ==
James Downey captained the Emmets to senior championships and Monaghan to Ulster titles early in the 1900s. Paddy Kilroy captained Monaghan to their only appearance in a Senior All Ireland final in 1930. Sean O'Carroll was also on that team and got a serious injury in the final. Stephen Gollogly is a member of the Monaghan team 2005/2018 winning two Ulster Senior Championships and an NFL Division two title as well as several club titles.

== Honours ==
- Monaghan Senior Football Championships (7): 1908, 1909, 1910, 1913, 1915, 1918, 1919
- Monaghan Senior Football League (1): 2008
- Monaghan Intermediate Football Championship (6): 1971, 1976, 2006, 2011, 2017, 2025
- Monaghan Intermediate Football League (5): 1993, 2002, 2006, 2001, 2017:
- Monaghan Junior Football Championship (2): 1964, 1992
