= Inniskeen Grattans GAC =

Monaghan-based Gaelic games club

- CLG Mhig Reachtain, Inis Caoin
- Founded: 1869
- County: Monaghan
- Nickname: Grattans
- Colours: Green, Red and White
- Grounds: Páirc Grattan
- Coordinates: 53°59′34″N 6°36′14″W

Playing kits
Standard colours

Senior Club Championships
	All Ireland	Ulster champions	Monaghan champions
Football:	-	-	5
Hurling:	-	-	2

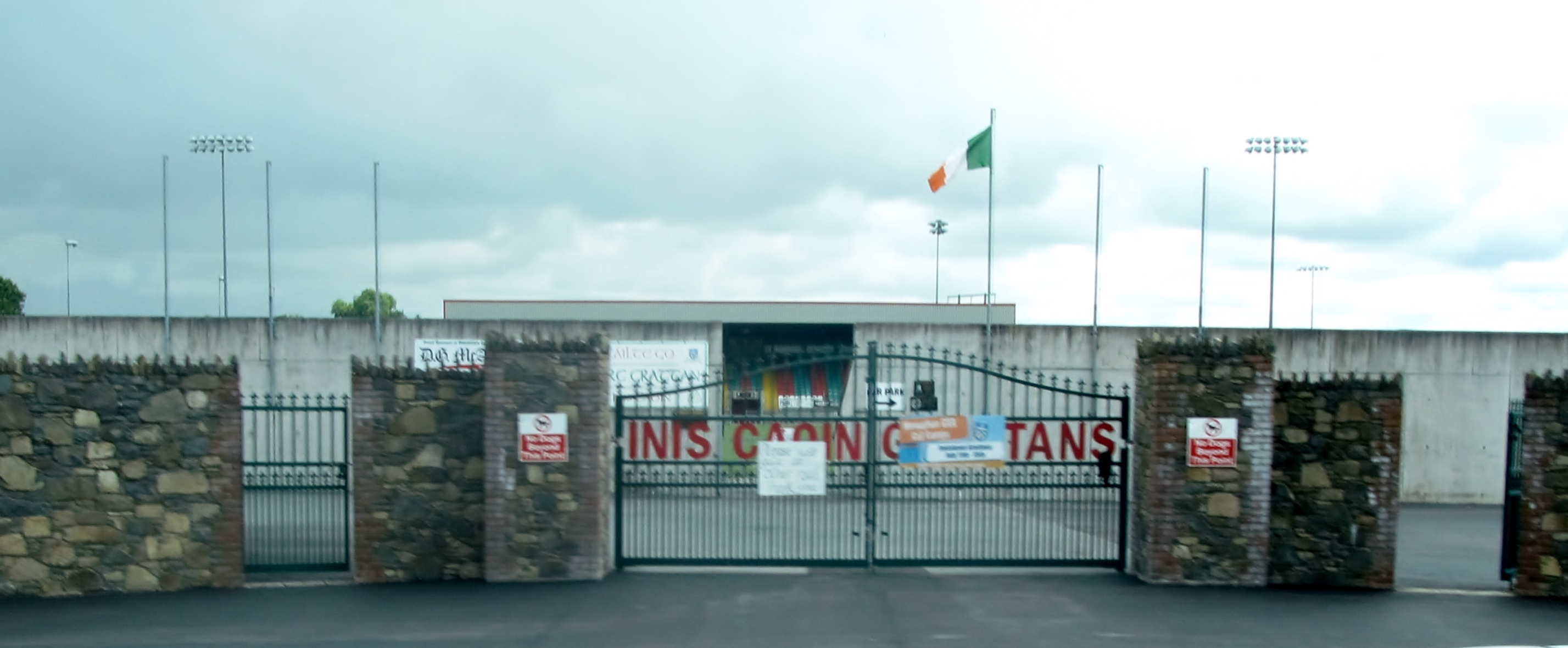
Entrance to grounds

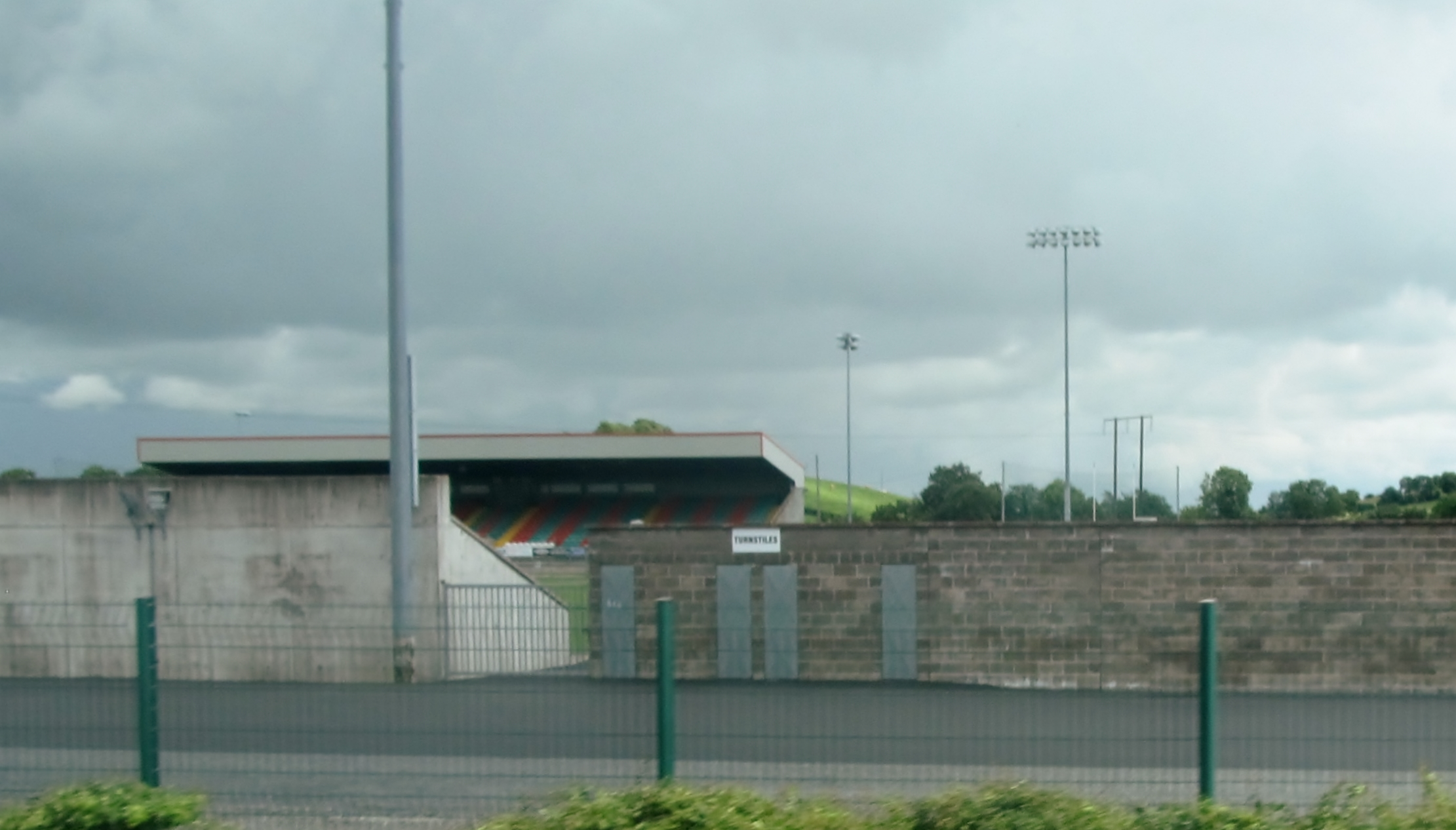
View of grandstand

Inniskeen Grattans Gaelic Athletic Club is a Gaelic Athletic Association club, based in Inniskeen, County Monaghan, Ireland. The club participates in both Gaelic football and hurling competitions organized by Monaghan GAA county board. In 2010, the club won its first ever Monaghan Senior Hurling Championship title.

== History ==
Inniskeen Grattans was founded in 1883 and is the oldest GAA club in County Monaghan and is named for Henry Grattan. It was founded one year before the Gaelic Athletic Association was founded in Thurles. In 1888, the first County Championship was held. The final between Inniskeen Grattans and Carrickmacross Emmets, was won by Inniskeen by 0–7 to 0-0. In August 1888, Inniskeen played Cavan champions Maghera Mac Finns in the first Ulster Senior Football Championship Final in Drogheda which ended in a draw, 0-2 each. Inniskeen won the replay in Drogheda on 9 December by 0–3 to 0-1 making Monaghan the first ever Ulster S.F. champions.

== Notable players ==
- Tommy Durnin, Louth player
- Patrick Kavanagh, poet, novelist

== Honours ==
=== Football ===
- Monaghan Senior Football Championships (5): 1888, 1905, 1938, 1947, 1948
- Monaghan Intermediate Football Championship (4): 1994, 2000, 2005, 2014
- Ulster Intermediate Club Football Championship (1): 2006
- All-Ireland Intermediate Club Football Championship (1): 2006
- Monaghan Junior Football Championship (1): 1983
- Monaghan Junior B Football Championship: 1967, 1994
- Monaghan Minor Football Championship: 1964, 2018
- Owen Ward Cup: 1945, 1947, 1949, 1958, 2023
- Fr. Hackett Cup: 1943, 1946, 1947, 1949, 1951, 1959, 1960, 1985, 2000, 2003
- Dr. Ward Cup: 1980, 1981
- Brennan Cup: 1961
- Monaghan Junior C Championship (P. Kieran Cup): 1982, 1983
- Monaghan Junior C League (Crawley Cup): 1999
- Hugh Brady Cup: 1985, 1994, 2004, 2008
- Kerley Cup (Under-21 Football): 1982, 2007
- Treanor Cup (Minor Football): 1980, 1999
- Fr. Maguire Cup (Minor Football League Div.1): 1949, 1964
- Monaghan Minor Football Championship Div. 2: 2003

=== Hurling ===
- Monaghan Senior Hurling Championship: 2010, 2013, 2016, 2023
- Monaghan Senior Hurling League: 2006, 2010
- Monaghan Reserve Hurling League: 2004, 2005, 2009
- Monaghan Minor Hurling Shield: 2001, 2004
- Jim O’Rourke Cup: 1999
