= Castleblayney Faughs GFC =

Monaghan-based Gaelic games club

- CLG Fág an Bealach, Baile na Lorgan
- Founded: 1905
- County: Monaghan
- Nickname: Blayney, Faughs
- Colours: Green and Gold
- Grounds: St Mary's Park, Castleblayney
- Coordinates: 54°06′45.96″N 6°43′50.17″W

Playing kits
Standard colours

Senior Club Championships
	All Ireland	Ulster champions	Monaghan champions
Football:	0	2	37

Castleblayney Faughs are a Gaelic football club based in the town of Castleblayney, County Monaghan, Ireland. They are the most successful club in the Monaghan Senior Football Championship, having won the competition 37 times, and have also won the Ulster Senior Club Football Championship twice. It is a separate club from Castleblayney Hurling Club, the town's hurling club.

== History ==
The current Castleblayney Faughs club was founded in November 1905. Within two years the Faughs won the Monaghan Senior Football Championship for the first time. After winning their second title in 1916, Castleblayney went on to beat Derry Sarsfields in the final of the National Aid tournament in 1917, a precursor to the Ulster Club Championship. They moved to their current grounds at St Mary's Park in 1953. Castleblayney reached the final of the Ulster Senior Club Football Championship in 1975, losing to St Joseph's. Blayney won the Ulster championship in 1986 beating All-Ireland champions Burren in the final. A second Ulster title was added in 1991 where they defeated Killybegs. The club's most recent county championship win came in 2003 when they won the title for the 37th time.

== Honours ==
- Ulster Senior Club Football Championship: 2
  - 1986, 1991
- Monaghan Senior Football Championship: 37
  - 1907, 1916, 1917, 1924, 1926, 1931, 1932, 1933, 1936, 1937, 1939, 1940, 1941, 1946, 1963, 1964, 1965, 1966, 1967, 1970, 1971, 1972, 1973, 1975, 1976, 1982, 1986, 1988, 1990, 1991, 1995, 1996, 1998, 1999, 2000, 2001, 2003
- Monaghan Senior Football League: 15
  - 1931, 1938, 1939, 1941, 1948, 1960, 1961, 1962, 1971, 1974, 1994, 1995, 1996, 2000, 2001

== Notable players ==
- Eugene "Nudie" Hughes
- Dermot Malone
- Eamonn McEneaney
- Stefan White
