= Emyvale =

Village in County Monaghan, Ireland

Emyvale Scairbh na gCaorach
- Village
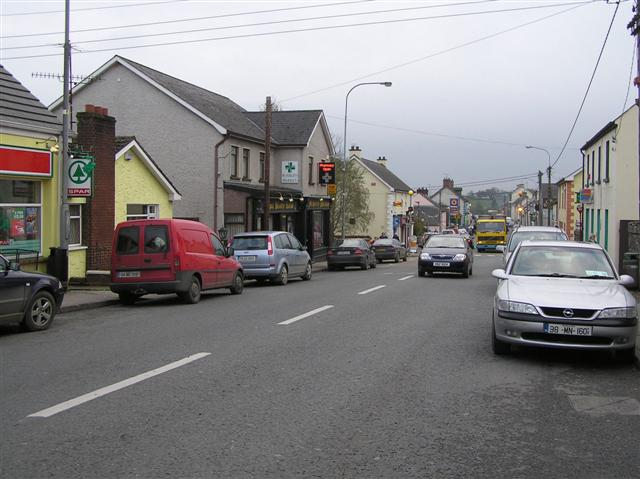

- Location in Ireland
- Coordinates: 54°20′31″N 6°57′31″W
- Country: Ireland
- Province: Ulster
- County: County Monaghan
- Barony: Truagh

Population (2016)
  - Total: 701
- Irish Grid Reference: H668338

Emyvale, known before the Plantation of Ulster as Scarnageeragh (Irish: Scairbh na gCaorach, meaning 'shallow ford of the sheep'), is a village and townland in the north of County Monaghan, Ireland. It is on the main Dublin to Derry and Letterkenny road, the N2, about 10 kilometres (6 mi) north of Monaghan and 8 km (5 mi) south of Aughnacloy. Its population is about 700. The village is located in the Barony of Truagh.

== History ==
In 1959, a Bronze Age tomb was discovered which proved that there was a settlement at the site of the village more than 3,000 years ago. Unfortunately for historians, the urn and other artifacts found were inadvertently destroyed during excavation of the tomb.

The name Scairbh na gCaorach (the Irish language name for Emyvale) means 'shallow ford of the sheep', referring to a low (and easily traversable) point in the Mountain Water river on which Emyvale is situated.

The name is thought to have come from the Uí Meith tribe, the village's first inhabitants. Scairbh na gCaorach was abbreviated to "Scarna" in the early part of the 19th Century (indeed a local hostelry bears this name), although this fell out of common usage and the village is now referred to by its English language name – Emyvale. In the 8th century, the McKenna Clan arrived and, by the 12th century, they had established an independent túath or kingdom in what is now North Monaghan which would last for the next 450 years.

In more recent times, Emyvale was immortalised by the renowned 19th-century Irish writer William Carleton as part of his Traits and Stories of the Irish Peasantry series, which included The Fair of Emyvale (a short story based upon Carleton's experiences of the north Monaghan landscape where he was educated as a young man at a 'hedge school' situated beside St Mary's chapel, Glennan, near Glaslough).

== Notable people ==
- Tommy Bowe, Irish rugby player, television presenter
- Thomas Taggart, American politician

== See also ==
- List of towns and villages in Ireland
