= Scotstown GAA =

Monaghan-based Gaelic games club

Scotstown
- An Bhoth
- Founded: 1960
- County: Monaghan
- Colours: Blue and White
- Grounds: Páirc Mhuire, Scotstown
- Coordinates: 54.281720°N 7.060631°W

Playing kits

Senior Club Championships
	All Ireland	Ulster champions	Monaghan champions
Football:	0	5	24

Scotstown GAA (Irish: CLG An Bhoth) is a Gaelic football and ladies' football club in Scotstown, County Monaghan, Ireland which represents the parish of Tydavnet.

== History ==
Although no precise date has been recorded for the foundation of the club, Gaelic games have been played in the parish since at least the nineteenth century. One of the earliest written accounts of a Scotstown club appeared in a January 1890 edition of The People's Advocate newspaper, referring to a game against neighbouring club Ballinode. Various clubs came and went in the parish over the first half of the twentieth century, with Scotstown winning a Monaghan Junior Football League (JFL) title in 1933, Tydavnet winning a Monaghan Junior Football Championship (JFC) in 1935, and Knockatallon securing a Monaghan JFL title in 1944. The parish was represented intermittently up until the late 1950s by these three clubs, with all three struggling in the face of emigration and unemployment.

The club finally made a breakthrough at senior level in the county after Tydavnet and Scotstown amalgamated, before going on to win the Monaghan Senior Football Championship (SFC) for the first time in 1960. The Knockatallon club threw their lot in with their parish neighbours shortly afterwards, and this united Tydavnet Parish club went on to unprecedented success in Monaghan and Ulster over the coming decades.

The most successful period in the history of the club was during the late 1970s and early 1980s, when the club won three consecutive Ulster Senior Club Football Championship (SFC) titles. It reached the All-Ireland Senior Club Football Championship final in 1979, losing that game to Cork GAA club Nemo Rangers. A fourth Ulster Club SFC title was secured in 1989, with the final victory coming against Tyrone GAA club Coalisland Na Fianna. The club won its fourteenth Monaghan SFC title in 1993, but a barren period followed over the next two decades. The measure of success during that period was that the club was able to preserve its senior status throughout. The drought was finally ended with another SFC title in 2013, followed by further success in 2015 and 2016.

Kieran Donnelly managed Scotstown to an Ulster Club SFC final in 2018, the team losing that game to Donegal GAA club Gaoth Dobhair.

== Facilities ==
Scotstown GAA plays its home fixtures at St Mary's Park (Páirc Mhuire), half a mile to the north-east of the village of Scotstown. Facilities at the ground include dressing rooms, a meeting room, a sports complex, a covered stand, a social club and a handball alley. The club training grounds are located at Kilmore East, between the villages of Scotstown and Ballinode. Facilities at the training grounds include dressing rooms, a full-sized Prunty pitch, two smaller training pitches and a perimeter walking-running track.

== Notable figures ==
The club has a long tradition of producing administrators, including Seán McCague (who served as President of the Gaelic Athletic Association: 2000–2003), and former Director General of the GAA, Páraic Duffy.

- Ray McCarron: 1986 All Star winner
- Rory Beggan: 2018 All Star goalkeeper and Ulster SFC winner
- Darren Hughes: Ulster SFC winner
- Conor McCarthy: 2023 All Star winner
- Gerry McCarville: NFL, Ulster SFC, Railway Cup winner
- Bernie Murray: NFL, Ulster SFC winner

== Honours ==
- Ulster Senior Club Football Championship: 5
  - 1978, 1979, 1980, 1989, 2025
  - Runner-up: 1985, 2015, 2018, 2023
- Monaghan Senior Football Championship: 24
  - 1960, 1961, 1974, 1977, 1978, 1979, 1980, 1981, 1983, 1984, 1985, 1989, 1992, 1993, 2013, 2015, 2016, 2017, 2018, 2020, 2021, 2023, 2024, 2025, 2026
