= Ballybay Pearse Brothers GAA =

Monaghan-based Gaelic games club

Ballybay Pearse Brothers
- Na Bráithre Piarsaigh, Béal Átha Beithe
- Founded: 1906
- County: Monaghan
- Nickname: Ballybay Pearses
- Colours: Maroon and White
- Grounds: Pearse Park, Knappagh, Ballybay
- Coordinates: 54.125762°N 6.875990°W

Playing kits
Standard colours

Senior Club Championships
	All Ireland	Ulster champions	Monaghan champions
Football:	-	-	9
Hurling:	-	-	1

Ballybay Pearse Brothers Gaelic Football Club is a Gaelic football club based in Ballybay, County Monaghan, Ireland.

== History ==
The club was founded as Ballybay GFC in 1906.

The club is named after the brothers Patrick Pearse and Willie Pearse, executed after the 1916 Easter Rising. Their grounds, Pearse Park, opened in April 1951, the 35th anniversary of the Rising, and were commonly used for inter-county fixtures. Ballybay won their first senior trophy in 1952 by winning the league (Owen Ward Cup). In 1953 their first championship followed as the team captained by Paddy McKearney beat Donaghmoyne in the county final. A "golden age" followed, Ballybay winning six Monaghan Senior Football Championships in the years 1953-1969. In the fifties, together with neighbours and great rivals Clontibret, Ballybay were a dominant force in the hugely popular tournament football in Ulster and Leinster at the time. The top clubs of the era were invited into the tournaments but more often than not the Monaghan teams emerged victorious.

Ballybay formerly had a hurling team, which won the Monaghan Senior Hurling Championship in 1976.

Ballybay had only won two county titles in recent decades, in 1987 and 2012, but most recently recorded victory in 2022.

== Notable players ==
- Paddy Kerr, Ulster SFC in 1979. 2 Co. SFC medals. Sigerson Cup winner who also captained UCD to the 1973–74 All-Ireland Senior Club Football Championship. Represented Ulster
- Paddy Linden 3 Ulster SFCs. 1988 All Star. First All Star goalkeeper from Ulster. Won "Save of the Year" 1979. 1 Co. SFC.
- Kieran Finlay, noted freetaker. Held scoring record of 1-9 from 1979 Ulster Final for many years. 1 Co. SFC
- Paul Finlay, two Ulster SFCs with Monaghan, Ballybay captain 2012, son of Kieran Finlay
- Drew Wylie, All Star nominated full-back - two Ulster SFCs with Monaghan
- Ryan Wylie,(brother of Drew, All Star nominated corner-back, two Ulster SFCs with Monaghan - Monaghan senior captain)

== Honours ==
- Monaghan Senior Football Championships (9)
  - 1953, 1954, 1957, 1959, 1962, 1969, 1987, 2012, 2022
- Monaghan Senior Hurling Championships (1)
  - 1976
