= Clontibret O'Neills GAA =

Monaghan-based Gaelic games club

Clontibret O'Neills
- Uí Néill Chluain Tiobraid
- Founded: 1913
- County: Monaghan
- Colours: Saffron and White
- Grounds: Páirc Uí Néill, Lisglassan, Clontibret
- Coordinates: 54.218552°N 6.844658°W

Playing kits
Standard colours

Senior Club Championships
| | All Ireland | Ulster champions | Monaghan champions |
|---|---|---|---|
| Football: | - | - | 17 |
| Hurling: | - | - | 17 |

Clontibret O'Neills Gaelic Athletic Association is a Gaelic football, hurling, camogie and ladies' Gaelic football club based in Clontibret, County Monaghan, Ireland.

== History ==
A team existed in the area, named after Hugh O'Neill, Earl of Tyrone in 1896. In 1906, variously called Clontibret O'Neills or Doohamlet O'Neills, another team is recorded. The current team is considered to derive from a 1913 affiliation to the Monaghan county board.

Clontibret have won 17 county senior titles; their best finish in the Ulster Senior Club Football Championship came in 1994, when they reached the final, losing to Bellaghy.

== Notable players ==
- Kieran Claffey: All-Ireland SFC winner with Offaly
- Vinny Corey
- Packie McCully
- Conor McManus
- Dessie Mone
- John Paul Mone
- Rory Mone

== Honours ==
=== Gaelic football ===
- Monaghan Senior Football Championship (17): 1949, 1950, 1951, 1952, 1955, 1956, 1958, 1968, 1994, 1997, 2002, 2006, 2007, 2009, 2010, 2014, 2019
- Monaghan Senior Football League (13): 1950, 1954, 1955, 1957, 1964, 1966, 1992, 1997, 1998, 2002, 2005, 2007, 2011
- Monaghan Junior Football Championship (1): 1947
- Monaghan Minor Football Championship (9): 1963, 1991, 1995, 1997, 2000, 2001, 2002, 2005 (as Saint Colmans, an amalgamation with Cremartin Shamrocks), 2010
- Ulster Minor Club Football Championship (1): 2002

=== Hurling ===
- Monaghan Senior Hurling Championship (17): 1966, 1969, 1970, 1973, 1978, 1980, 1981, 1982, 1983, 1984, 1985, 1986, 1987, 1990, 1991, 1997, 2003
- Monaghan Junior Championship (1): 2020
