= R192 road (Ireland) =

Road in Ireland

R192 road
- Bóthar R192
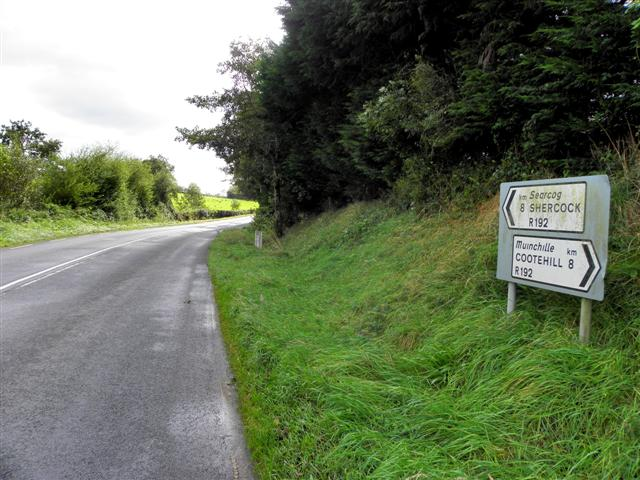
- R192 at Lisnaclea, County Cavan

Route information
- Length: 17 km (11 mi)

Location
- Country: Ireland
- Primary destinations: County Cavan; Cootehill - leaves the R190; Cohaw; Lough Sillan; Shercock - terminates at the R181

Highway system
- Roads in Ireland; Motorways; Primary; Secondary; Regional

The R192 road is a regional road in Ireland, linking Cootehill to Shercock in County Cavan. The route is 17 km (11 mi) long.

== Route ==
North to south the route starts at the R190 outside Cootehill. It heads southeast for 17km to its junction with the R181 just outside Shercock, along its route it passes Lough Tacker and Lough Sillan, Cohaw a Neolithic court tomb and crosses the River Annalee.

== See also ==
- Roads in Ireland
- National primary road
- National secondary road
