= 2019 Monaghan Intermediate Football Championship =

Football game in Ireland

Monaghan IFC
Tournament details
- County: Monaghan
- Year: 2019
- Trophy: Paddy O'Rourke Cup
- Sponsor: McElvaney's Waste & Recycling
- Teams: 10

Winners
- Qualify for: Ulster Club IFC

Other
- Website: Monaghan GAA

The 2019 Monaghan Intermediate Football Championship will be the nth edition of Monaghan GAA's primary gaelic football tournament for intermediate clubs in County Monaghan, Ireland. Ten teams compete, with the winners representing Monaghan in the AIB GAA Ulster Club Intermediate Football Championship. The championship uses a double-elimination format for Rounds 1 and 2 before becoming knock-out.

Doohamlet are the defending champions after defeating Sean McDermott's in the 2018 final. The 2019 competition sees the return of Cremartin and Emyvale to the Intermediate ranks following their promotion from the Junior competition, and also Magheracloone and Monaghan Harps, following their relegation from the Senior ranks.

== Team changes ==
The two bottom-placed teams in the Monaghan Senior Football League are relegated to the Intermediate ranks for the following season, with the Intermediate Football Championship winners and Intermediate Football League winners promoted in their place. If a team wins both the Intermediate Championship and League, then the next highest placed team in the League will be promoted. Similarly, the two bottom-placed teams in the Monaghan Intermediate Football League are relegated to the Junior ranks for the following season, with the Junior Football Championship winners and Junior Football League winners promoted in their place. If a team wins both the Junior Championship and League, then the next highest placed team in the League will be promoted.

The following teams have changed division since the 2018 championship season.

=== From I.F.C. ===
Promoted from 2018 Monaghan Intermediate Football Championship

- Doohamlet O'Neills - (Championship & League winners)
- Currin St. Patricks - (2nd in League)

Relegated from 2018 Monaghan Intermediate Football Championship

- Toome St. Victors (9th in League)
- Blackhill Emeralds (10th in League)

=== To I.F.C. ===
Relegated to 2019 Monaghan Intermediate Football Championship

- Magheracloone Mitchells (9th in League)
- Monaghan Harps (10th in League)

Promoted to 2019 Monaghan Intermediate Football Championship

- Emyvale Oliver Plunketts (Championship Winners)
- Cremartin Shamrocks (League Winners)

== Participating teams ==
Club	2018 C'ship Position	Last Success
Aughnamullen Sarsfields		
Corduff Gaels		
Cremartin Shamrocks		
Donaghmoyne Fontenoys		
Emyvale Oliver Plunketts		
Killanny Geraldines		
Magheracloone Mitchells		
Monaghan Harps		
Sean McDermotts		
Tyholland		

== Preliminary round ==
Four of the ten teams are drawn into the preliminary round. The remaining six teams are drawn in Round 1A. The winners of the two Preliminary rounds play each other in Round 1A.

18 August 2019 Preliminary round	Magheracloone	4-16 (28) – (18) 3-09	Tyholland	Carrickmacross
13:00 IST (UTC+1)				Venue: Emmet Park
				Referee: Fintan Finnegan (Castleblayney)

18 August 2019 Preliminary round	Sean McDermotts	1-11 (14) – (18) 0-18	Monaghan Harps	Scotstown
17:00 IST (UTC+1)				Venue: St. Mary's Park
				Referee: Patrick Caulfield (Blackhill)

== Round 1 ==
=== Round 1A ===
The six teams not drawn in the preliminary round enter the competition in this round, along with the two Preliminary round winners (who play each other). The four Round 1A winners proceed to Round 2A while the four losers enter the back-door in Round 1B.

17 August 2019 Round 1A	Corduff	2-09 (15) – (11) 1-08	Aughnamullen	Inniskeen
18:00 IST (UTC+1)				Venue: Grattan Park
				Referee: Raymond Malone (Castleblayney)

17 August 2019 Round 1A	Killanny	2-09 (15) – (15) 1-12 (a.e.t.) (3-4 pen)	Donaghmoyne	Inniskeen
19:30 IST (UTC+1)				Venue: Grattan Park
				Referee: Andrew Mullan (Inniskeen)
		Penalty shootout

18 August 2019 Round 1A	Cremartin	1-12 (15) – (19) 3-10	Emyvale	Scotstown
18:30 IST (UTC+1)				Venue: St. Mary's Park
				Referee: Donal Connolly (Scotstown)

23 August 2019 Round 1A	Magheracloone	4-12 (24) – (14) 0-14	Monaghan Harps	Castleblayney
20:00 IST (UTC+1)				Venue: St. Mary's Park
				Referee: Barry Grimley (Cremartin)

=== Round 1B ===
The losers of the preliminary round (two teams) enter this round along with the losers of Round 1A, but not that fixture which contains the preliminary round winners (three teams). A draw will be made to determine the two pairings, with the fifth team obtaining a bye into Round 2B. Two teams will exit the competition at this stage.

The following teams are eligible to take part in Round 1B -

- Tyholland
- Sean McDermotts
- Aughnamullen
- Cremartin
- Killanny

One team will receive a bye into Round 2B.

23 August 2019 Round 1B	Aughnamullen	1-22 (25) – (17) 2-11	Tyholland	Emyvale
20:00 IST (UTC+1)				Venue: St. Oliver Plunkett's Park
				Referee: Diarmuid Boylan (Donaghmoyne)

24 August 2019 Round 1B	Cremartin	2-08 (14) – (22) 2-16	Killanny	Blackhill
16:00 IST (UTC+1)				Venue: Emerald Park
				Referee: Hugh McKenna (Monaghan Harps)

== Round 2 ==
=== Round 2A ===
The four winners from Round 1A play each other. The two winners proceed to the semi-finals while the losers must play in Round 3.

The following teams are eligible to take part in Round 2A -

- Corduff
- Donaghmoyne
- Emyvale
- Magheracloone

8 September 2019 Round 2A	Corduff	1-17 (20) – (23) 0-23	Magheracloone	Aughnamullen
13:00 IST (UTC+1)				Venue: Sarsfield Park
				Referee: Patrick Caulfield (Blackhill)

8 September 2019 Round 2A	Emyvale	3-12 (21) – (23) 2-17	Donaghmoyne	Drumhowan
16:00 IST (UTC+1)
				Referee: David Hurson (Drumhowan)

=== Round 2B ===
The two winners from Round 1B, one team who received a bye through Round 1B and the loser of the Round 1A tie involving the preliminary round winners play in this round. The winners will proceed to Round 3 while the losers will exit the championship. The following teams are eligible to take part in Round 2B -

- Aughnamullen
- Killanny
- Sean McDermotts
- Monaghan Harps

7 September 2019 Round 2B	Sean McDermotts	2-09 (15) – (27) 3-18	Aughnamullen	Castleblayney
17:00 IST (UTC+1)				Venue: St. Mary's Park
				Referee: Andrew Mullen (Scotstown)

7 September 2019 Round 2B	Monaghan Harps	0-13 (13) – (09) 0-09 (a.e.t.)	Killanny	Castleblayney
18:30 IST (UTC+1)				Venue: St. Mary's Park
				Referee: Jason McAndrew (Ballybay)

== Round 3 ==
The two winners from Round 2B play the two losers from Round 2A. The winners proceed to the semi-finals while the losers exit the championship.

The following teams are eligible to take part in Round 3 -

- Aughnamullen
- Monaghan Harps
- Corduff
- Emyvale

21 September 2019 Round 3	Aughnamullen	0-13 (13) – (28) 4-16	Emyvale	Scotstown
17:00 IST (UTC+1)				Venue: St. Mary's Park
				Referee: Colin Murphy (Sean McDermotts)

22 September 2019 Round 3	Monaghan Harps	0-14 (14) – (18) 2-12 (a.e.t.)	Corduff	Aughnamullen
13:00 IST (UTC+1)				Venue: Sarsfield Park
				Referee: Raymond Malone (Castleblayney)

== Semifinals ==
The two winners from Round 2A play the two winners from Round 3.

29 September 2019 Semifinal	Magheracloone	1-13 (16) – (12) 1-09	Emyvale	Inniskeen
17:00 IST (UTC+1)				Venue: Páirc Grattan
				Referee: Jason McAndrew (Ballybay)

4 October 2019 Semifinal	Donaghmoyne	0-17 (17) – (14) 2-08	Corduff	Inniskeen
15:30 IST (UTC+1)				Venue: Páirc Grattan
				Referee: Xavier Coyle (Tyholland)

== Final ==
13 October 2019
15:30 IST (UTC+1)
Final

Magheracloone	v	Donaghmoyne

Páirc Grattan, Inniskeen
Referee: Andrew Mullan (Scotstown)

== See also ==
- 2019 AIB Ulster Club Intermediate Football Championship
