= Cohaw =

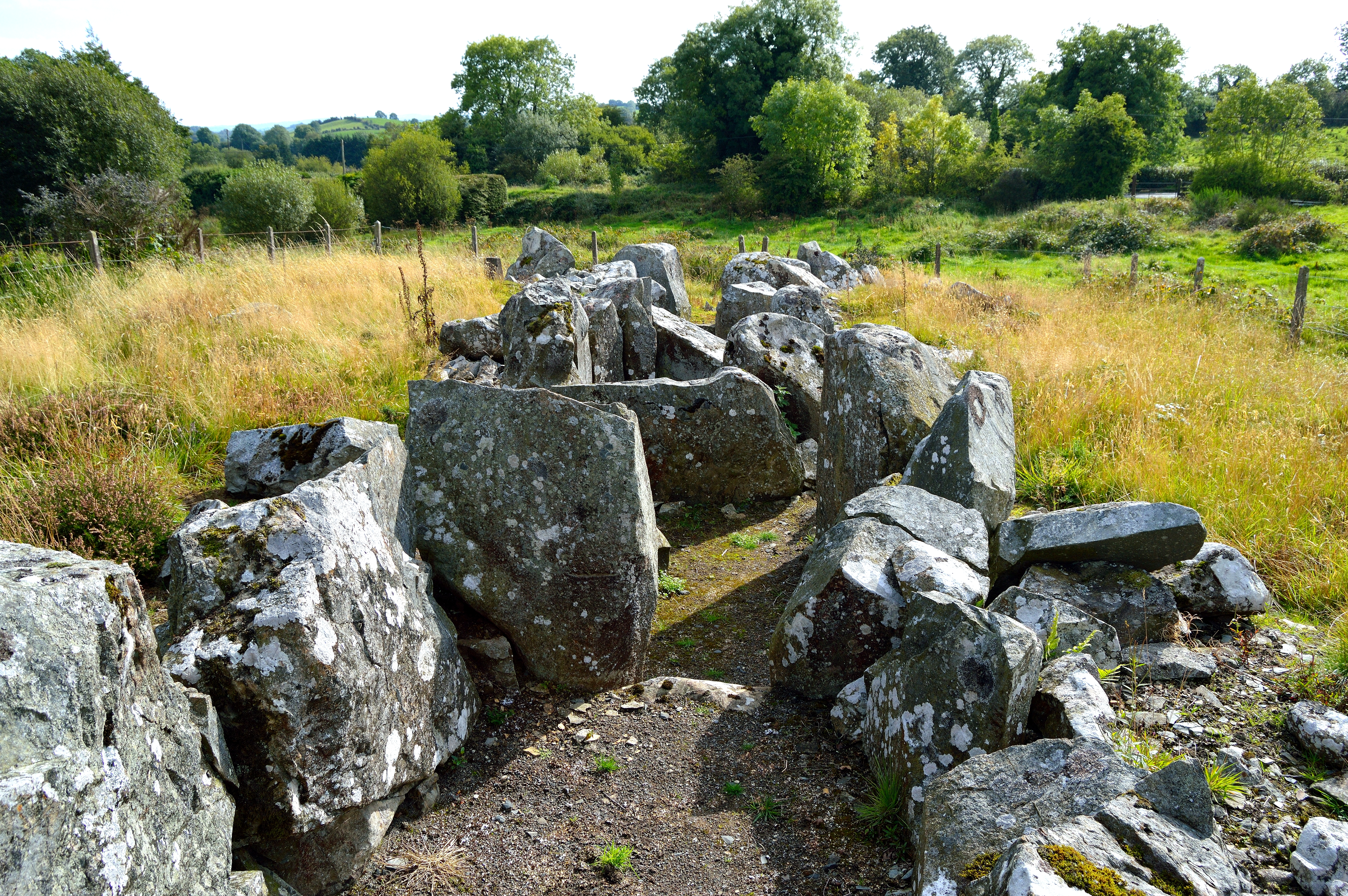
- Cohaw Court Tomb

- Location within Ireland
- 54°06′N 7°03′W
- Location: Cootehill, County Cavan

National monument of Ireland
- Official name: Cohaw
- Reference no.: 456

Cohaw is a Neolithic double court tomb located 4 kilometres south-east of Cootehill, County Cavan, Ireland. The tomb lies on a ridge overlooking a small tributary of the River Annalee which flows into Lough Oughter.

== History ==
Court-tombs are among the earliest megalithic monuments to be built in Ireland, and there are more than three hundred examples in the country. Court tombs often include a ceremonial courtyard set in front of a burial vault. Courts were built in a variety of shapes, with oval or circular forms predominating.

County Cavan has a large number of megalithic tombs, including eighteen court tombs. Cohaw was excavated by archaeologist, Howard Kilbride-Jones, in 1949. The excavation finds consisted of teeth, skull fragments, and the cremated remains of a child. A carinated, round-bottomed Neolithic bowl was also uncovered. An unusual feature to the site at the time of excavation was a bow-shaped bank across the entrance to the north court. The tomb lies on a ridge overlooking a small tributary of the Annagh river.

== Description ==
Cohaw is a neolithic double court tomb located 4 kilometres south-east of Cootehill, County Cavan, Ireland and is visible from the R192 road between Shercock and Cootehill. The tomb is known locally as the "Giant's Grave" and was originally built as two single tombs. Each tomb consists of a court at each end, connected by a long, five chambered burial gallery. The south court is two thirds of a circle in shape, while the north court is u-shaped. The northern court contains two post holes that would have held large pillar-stones. The tomb stands in an 82 ft (25m) long rectangular cairn.

== Gallery ==
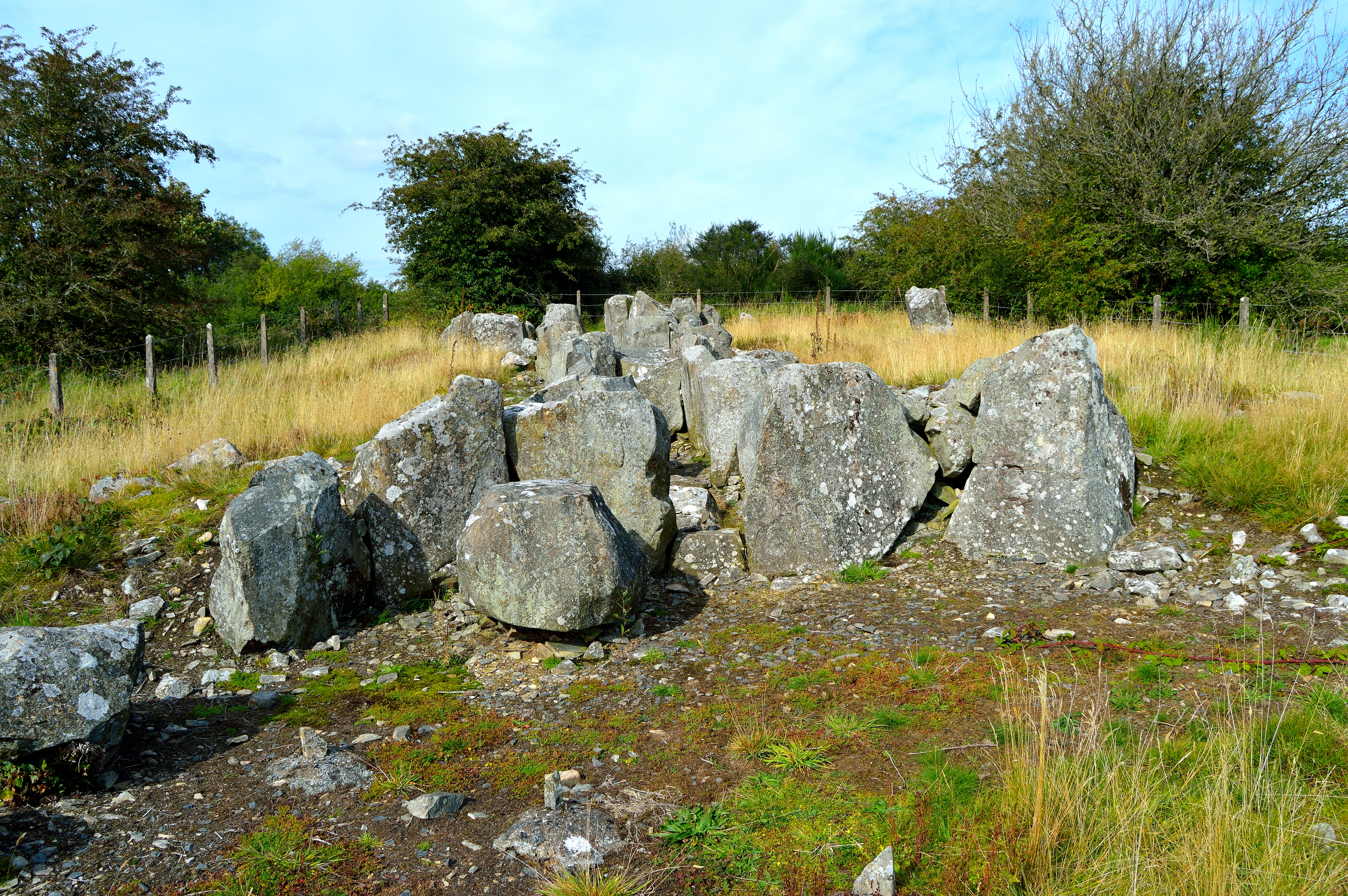
Cohaw tomb entrance

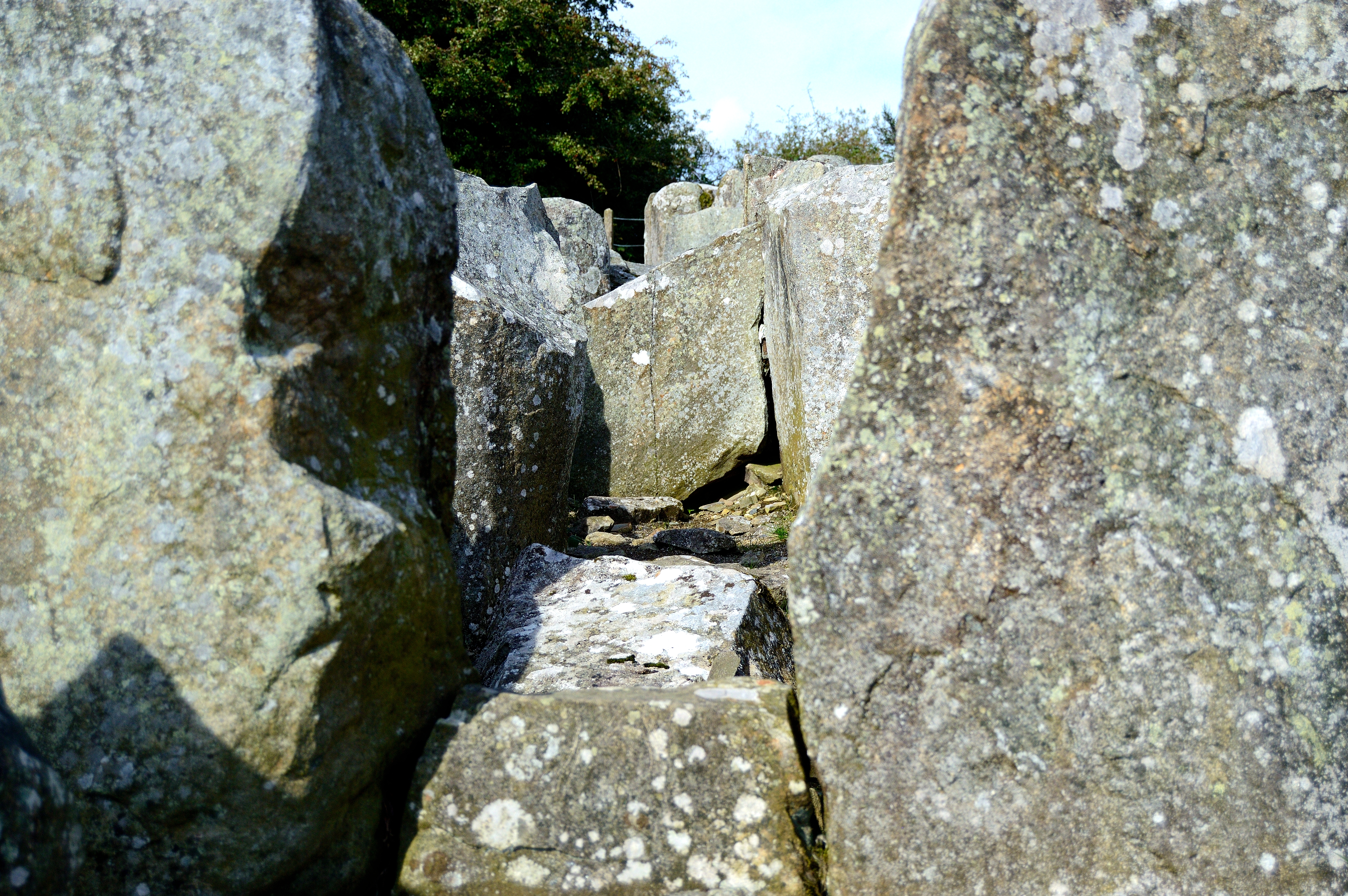
Cohaw, inside chamber

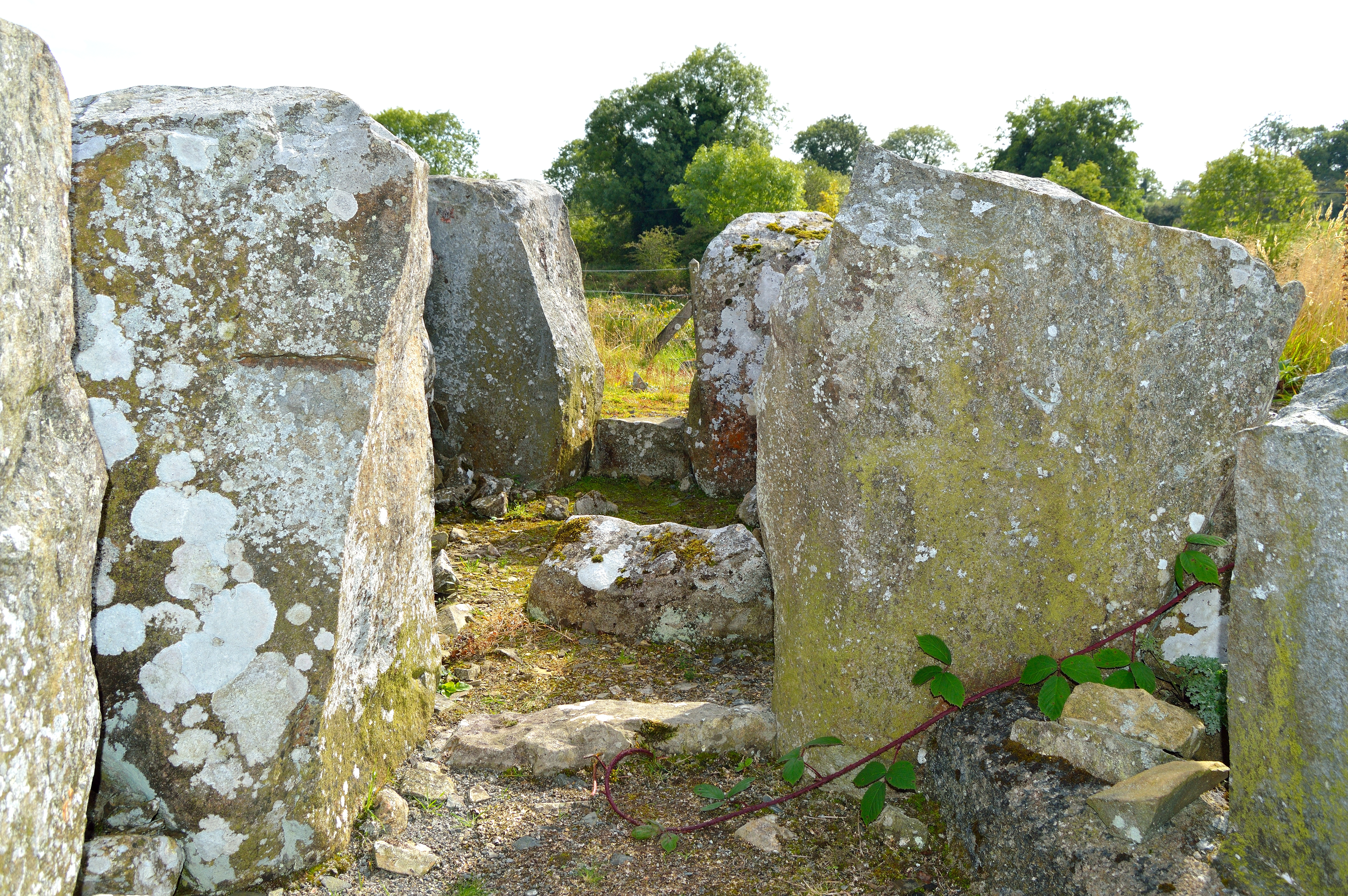
Cohaw tomb, chamber view

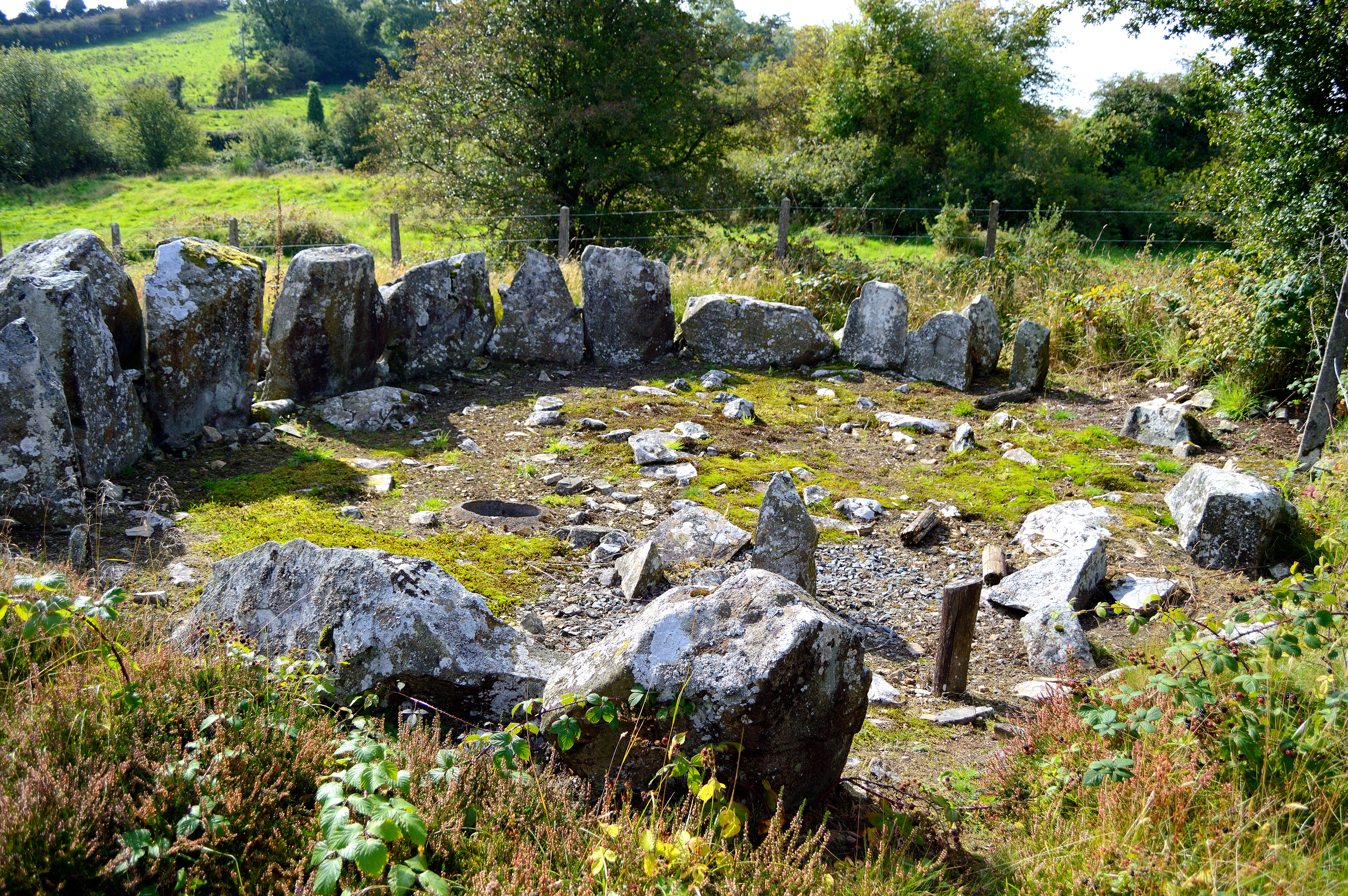
Cohaw south court

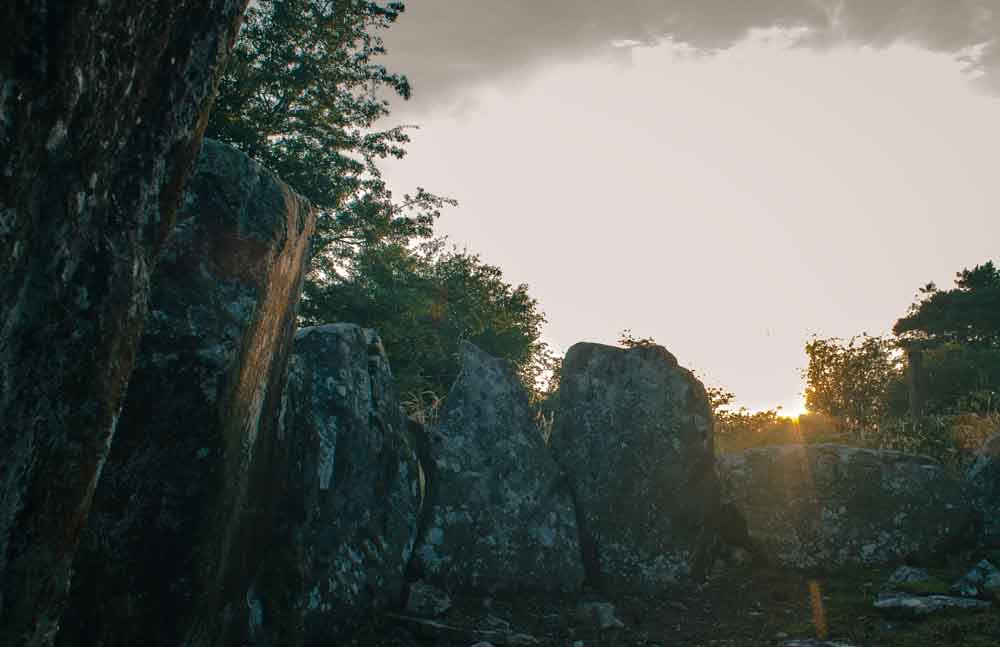
Cohaw at sunset

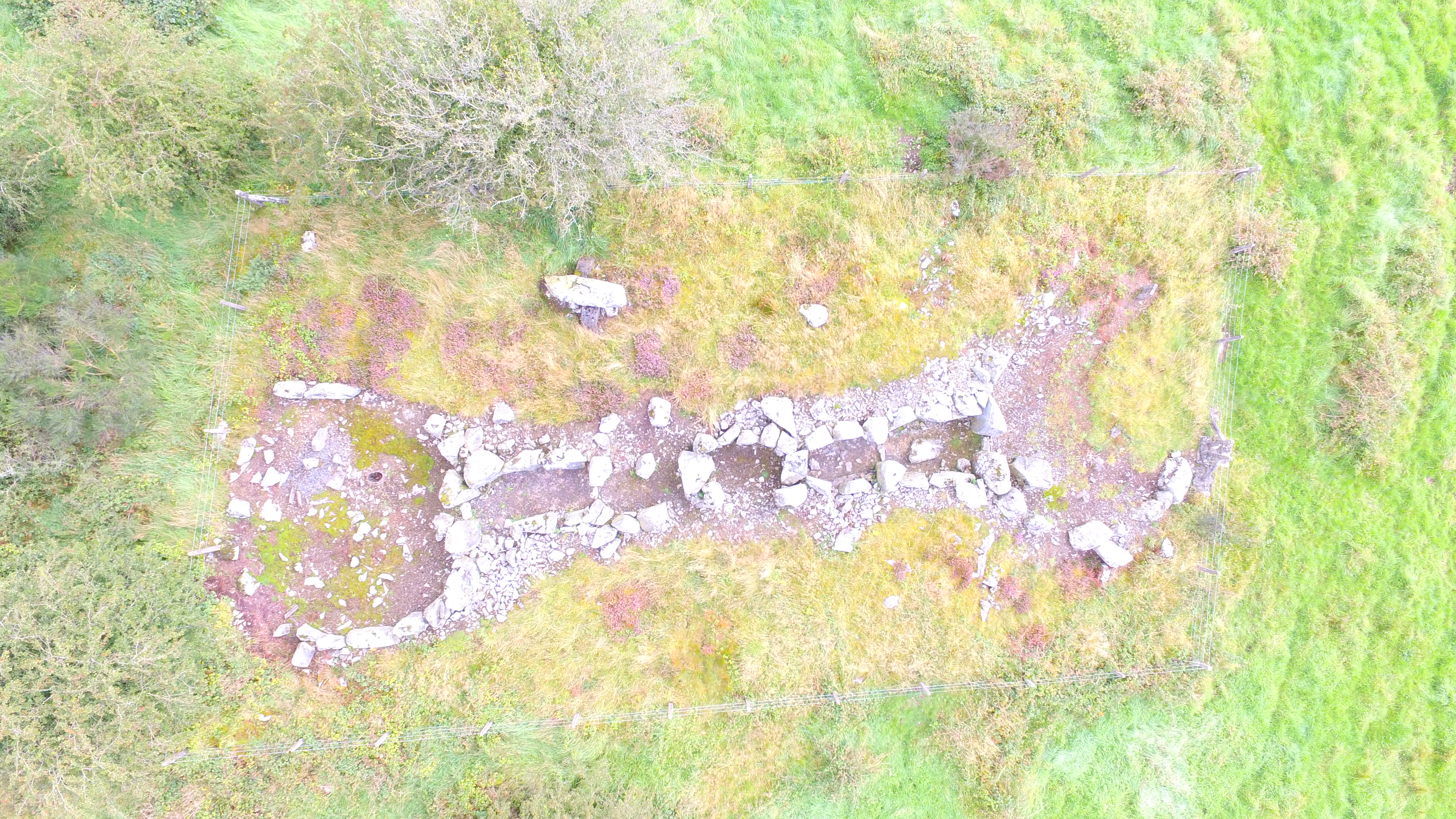
Cohaw, aerial view
