= R180 =

R180 may refer to:

- Dyn'Aéro R180, a French light aircraft design
- R180 road (Ireland), a road in Ireland
