= R180 road (Ireland) =

Road in Ireland

Coordinates: 54.118627°N 6.891371°W

R180 road
- Bóthar R180
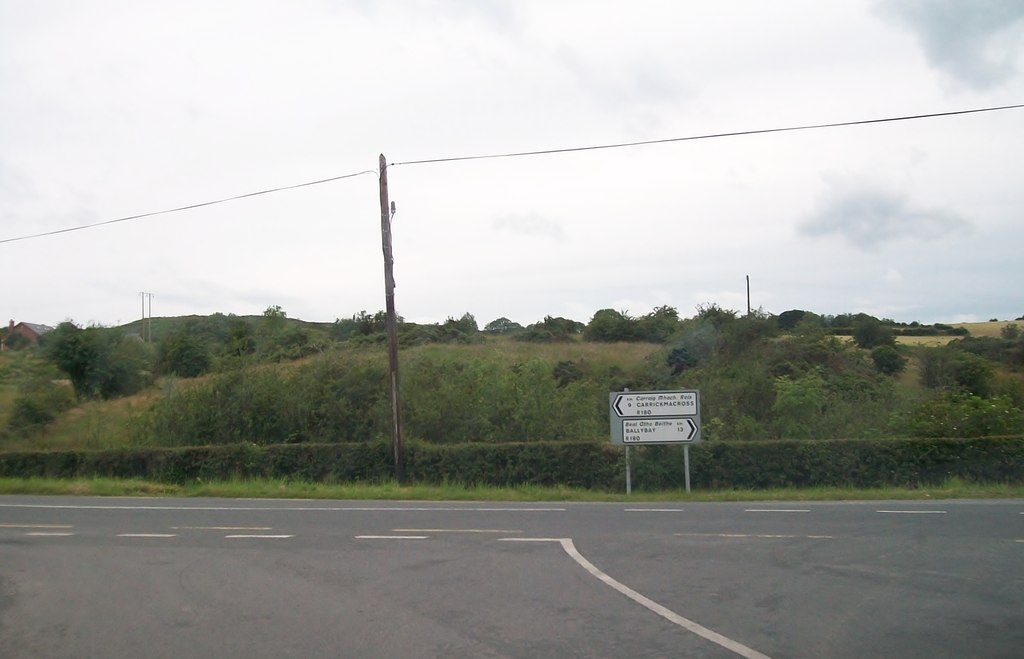
- Laragh Road meeting R180

Route information
- Length: 21.7 km (13.5 mi)

Major junctions
- From: R162 Ballybay
- R181 Cooltrimegish
- To: R927 Carrickmacross

Location
- Country: Ireland

Highway system
- Roads in Ireland; Motorways; Primary; Secondary; Regional

The R180 road is a regional road in County Monaghan, Ireland.
