= R188 road (Ireland) =

Road in Ireland

Coordinates: 54.049858°N 7.164545°W

R188 road
- Bóthar R188
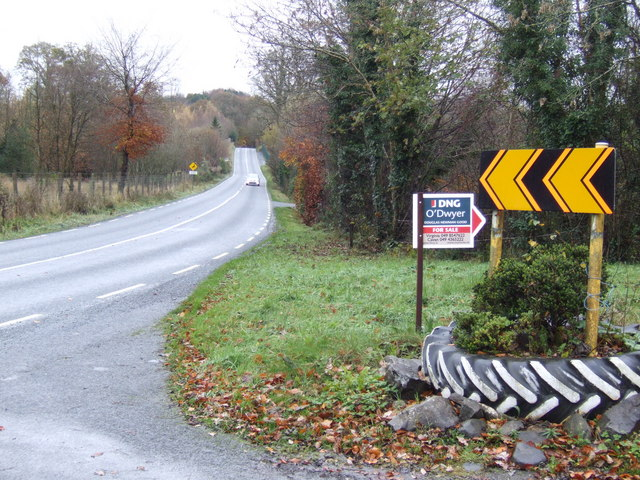
- R188 road near Cootehill

Route information
- Length: 45.4 km (28.2 mi)

Major junctions
- From: R162 Monaghan
- R183 Dromore East; R193 Rockcorry; R189 Dyan; Crosses Dromore River and enters County Cavan; R190 Cootehill; Crosses Annagh River; R165 Rakenny; N3 Cavan Bypass
- To: R212 Cavan

Location
- Country: Ireland

Highway system
- Roads in Ireland; Motorways; Primary; Secondary; Regional

The R188 road is a regional road in Ireland, located in County Cavan and County Monaghan.
