= Threemilehouse =

Threemilehouse Teach na dTrí Mhíle
- Village
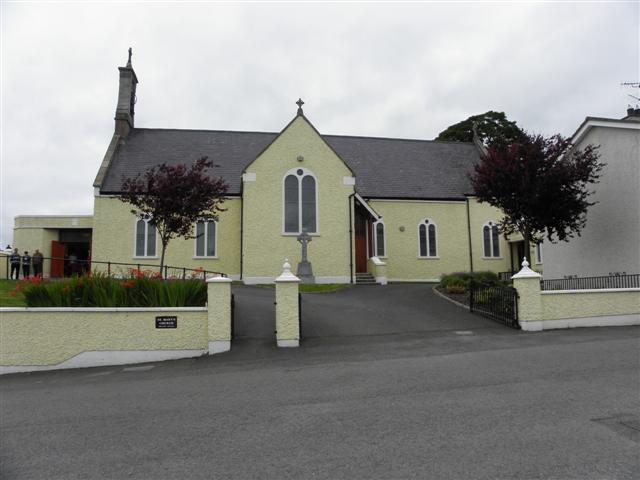
- St Mary church

- Location in Ireland
- Coordinates: 54°13′00″N 7°02′36″W
- Country: Ireland
- Province: Ulster
- County: County Monaghan

Population (2006)
  - Total: 167
- Time zone: UTC+0 (WET)
  - Summer (DST): UTC-1 (IST (WEST))

Threemilehouse or Three Mile House (Irish: Teach na dTrí Mhíle) is a village in County Monaghan, Ireland. It is roughly midway between Monaghan and Newbliss on the R189. The nearest village is Smithborough. It lies mostly within the townlands of Cabragh, Drumguill and Kilnaclay in the parish of Kilmore & Drumsnat. Saint Mary's church and primary school on the hill overlook the village. Threemilehouse has one of the oldest graveyards in the country, Drumsnat, which dates to 600 AD. The Central Statistics Office's report for the 2006 census lists Cabragh as a settlement with a total population of 167.

== History ==
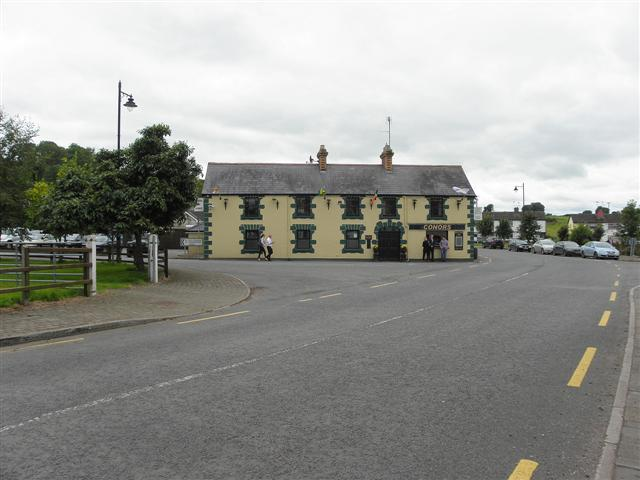
Conor's pub on R189 road

There was once a monastery founded by St. Molua at nearby Drumsnat. Drumsnat (Drom Sneachta) means the ‘Ridge of Snow’ and, according to tradition, this hill was covered by a mid summer snowfall in answer to the saint’s prayers for a site for a church. The Church of Ireland cemetery also marks the last resting place of Emily and Mary Wilde, the half-sisters of Oscar Wilde, who died following a fire at the nearby Drumaconnor House in 1871

== Sport ==
Threemilehouse has a Gaelic Athletic Association (GAA) football club, Sean McDermotts, who wear yellow and white.
