= St Aidan's Church, Butlersbridge =

Church in Butlersbridge, County Cavan, Ireland

Coordinates: 54°02′36″N 7°22′30″W

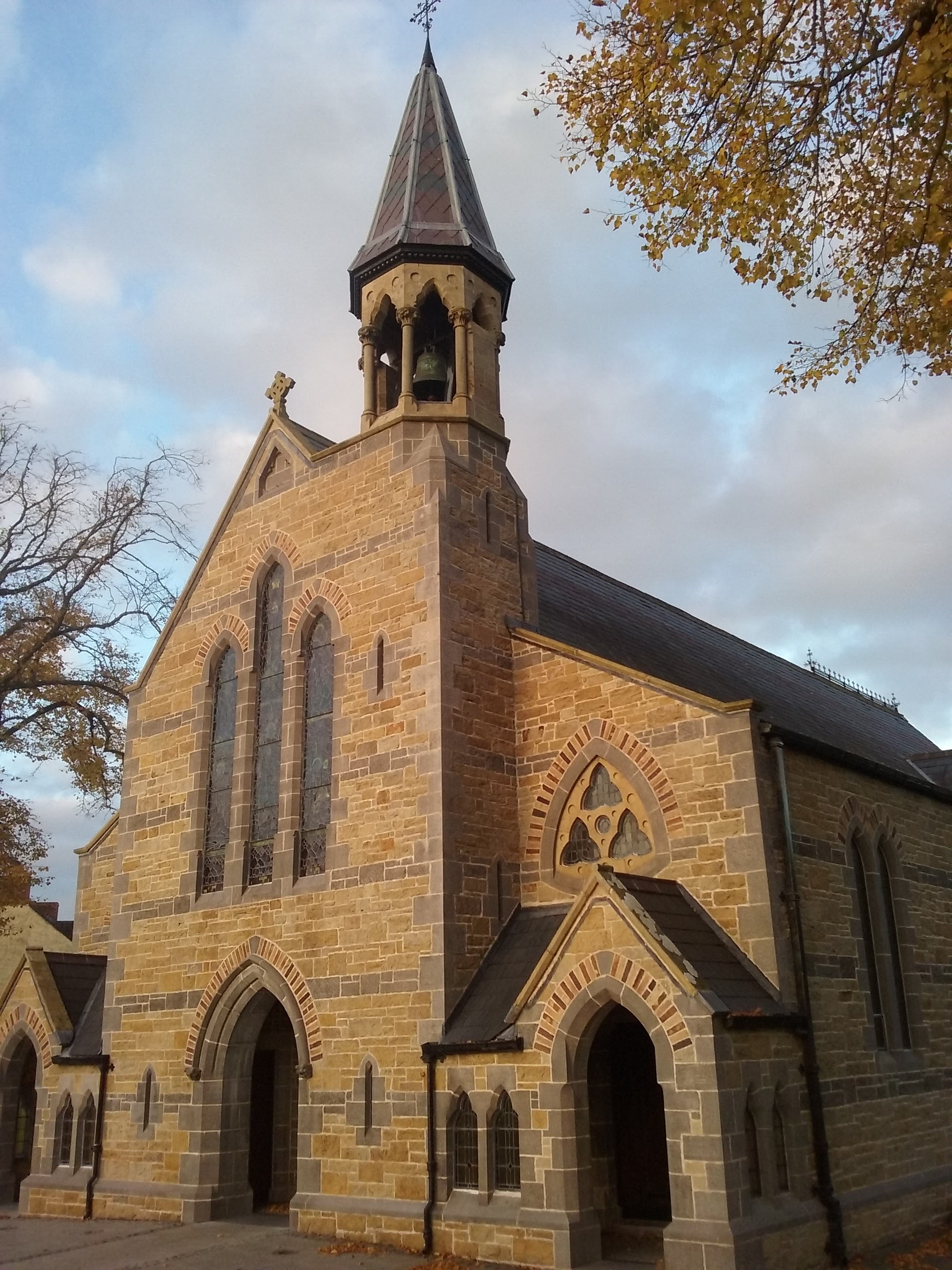
St Aidan's church, Butlersbridge

St Aidan's Church, Butlersbridge, commonly known in Irish as Seipeal Droichead an Bhuitléirigh, was built in Butlersbridge between 1861 and 1863 on a site given free by the Earl of Lanesboro. It is situated on the Annalee River. The church was dedicated on 14 June 1863 by Bishop James Browne. The architect was William Hague Jnr whose family came from the nearby townland of Plush.
