= St. Brigid's Primary School =

St. Brigid's Primary School may refer to:

- St. Brigid's Primary School, Augher, County Tyrone, Northern Ireland
- St. Brigid's Primary School, Ballymoney, County Antrim, Northern Ireland
- St. Brigid's Primary School, Belleeks, County Armagh, Northern Ireland
- St. Brigid's Primary School, Crossmaglen, County Armagh, Northern Ireland
- St Brigid's Primary School, Brockagh, County Tyrone, Northern Ireland
