= Sean McDermotts GAA =

Sean McDermotts GAA may refer to:

- Maghery Sean MacDermott's GAC, a sports club in County Armagh, Northern Ireland
- Seán McDermott's GFC (Louth) a sports club in County Louth, Ireland
- Sean McDermotts GAA (Monaghan), a sports club in County Monaghan, Ireland
