= R183 road (Ireland) =

Road in Ireland

R183 road
- Bóthar R183
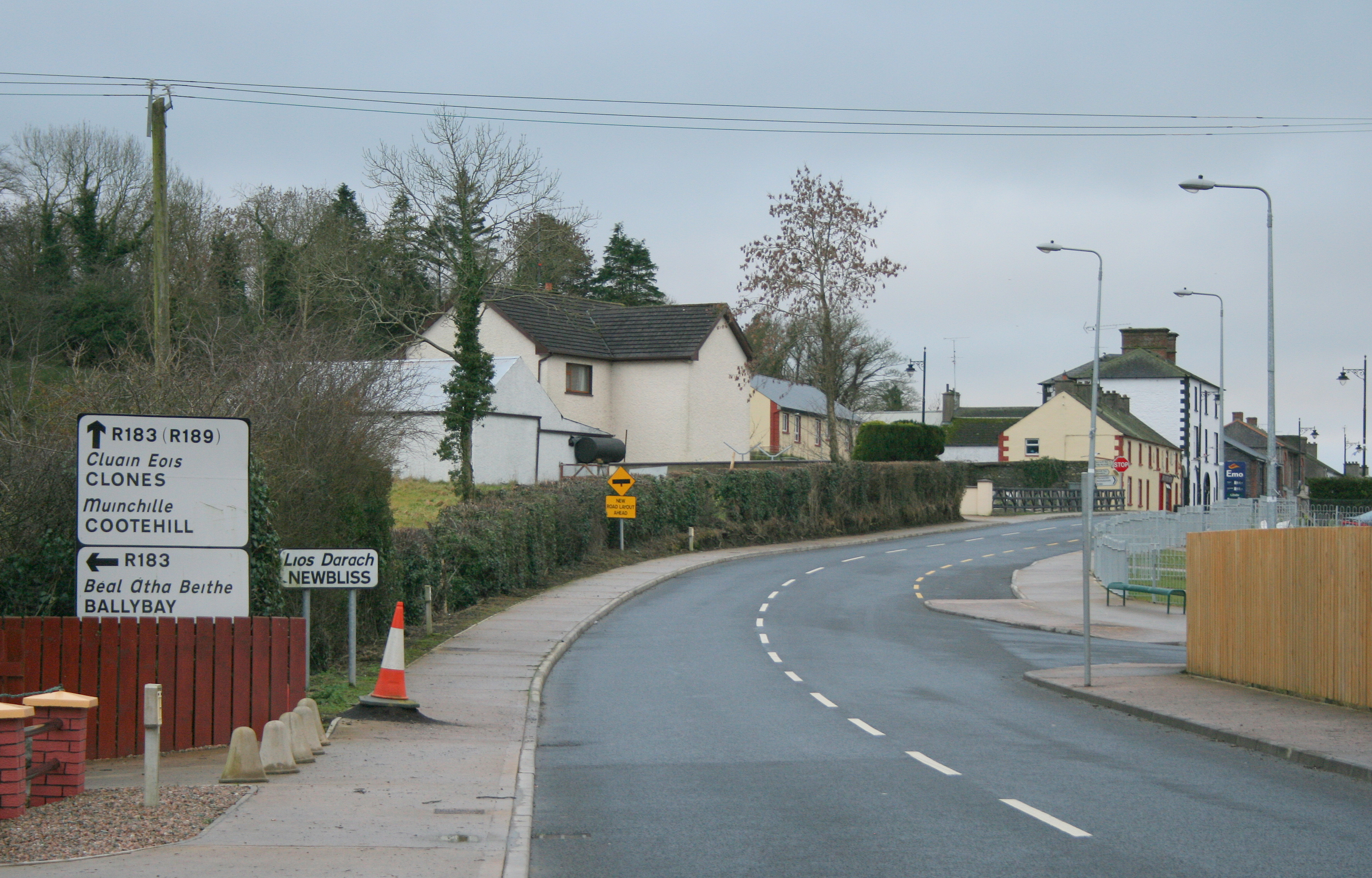
- R183 approaching Newbliss

Route information
- Length: 36 km (22 mi)

Location
- Country: Ireland
- Primary destinations: County Monaghan; Clondergole - starts at the Northern Ireland border where the A34 becomes the R183 on the western outskirts of Clones; (N54); (R212); Killeevan; Newbliss - (R189); Swan's Cross Roads (roundabout) (R188); Ballybay - (R162); Crosses the N2 at a grade separated junction; Castleblayney - terminates at the R181

Highway system
- Roads in Ireland; Motorways; Primary; Secondary; Regional

The R183 road is a regional road in the Republic of Ireland, linking Clones to Castleblayney in County Monaghan. The route is 36 km (22 mi) long.

== Route ==
West to east, the route starts as the A34 in County Fermanagh in Northern Ireland, on the western edge of Clones. In the town it crosses the N54. It continues eastwards through Newbliss and Ballybay before passing under the N2 near Castleblayney.

From the west of the R183, the A34 runs to Maguiresbridge, where it joins the A4.

== See also ==
- Roads in Ireland
- National primary road
- National secondary road
