= Bunnoe =

Townland in County Cavan, Ireland

Bunnoe Bun Abha
- Townland
- St. Mary's Roman Catholic Church, Bunnoe
- Interactive map of Bunnoe
- Country: Ireland

Bunnoe (Irish: Bun Abha, meaning 'mouth of the river') is a townland in County Cavan, Ireland. It is in the civil parish of Drung, part of the barony of Tullygarvey and in the Diocese of Kilmore. It also gives its name to the area in the northern part of the Roman Catholic part of the parish of Drung. The townland gives its name to the Bunnoe River, which rises in County Monaghan and winds its way down to Bunnoe where it flows into the River Annalee. The Bunnoe River is a well known trout fishery and the Bunnoe and District Angling Club take care of the river, keeping it well-stocked.

== St Mary's Church ==
There was a long clay cabin, known as Bunnoe chapel, built in 1780 in the townland of Lisboduff. The present church was being built in 1839 when it was damaged in the Night of the Big Wind. It was completed in 1843.
