= R182 road (Ireland) =

Road in Ireland

R182 road
- Bóthar R182
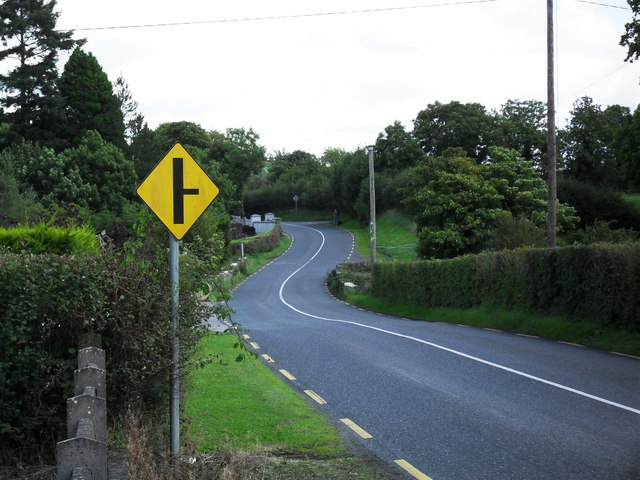
- R182 at Frankford Bridge

Route information
- Length: 9.6 km (6.0 mi)

Location
- Country: Ireland
- Primary destinations: County Monaghan; leaves the R181 at Castleblayney; Terminates at the Republic of Ireland–United Kingdom border at Altnamackan

Highway system
- Roads in Ireland; Motorways; Primary; Secondary; Regional

The R182 road is a regional road in Ireland linking Castleblayney and the Republic of Ireland–United Kingdom border in County Monaghan. The road continues in Northern Ireland as the A25. The road is 9.6 km (6.0 mi) long.

== See also ==
- Roads in Ireland
- National primary road
- National secondary road
