= Butlersbridge =

Village in County Cavan, Ireland

Butlersbridge Droichead an Bhuitléaraigh
- Village
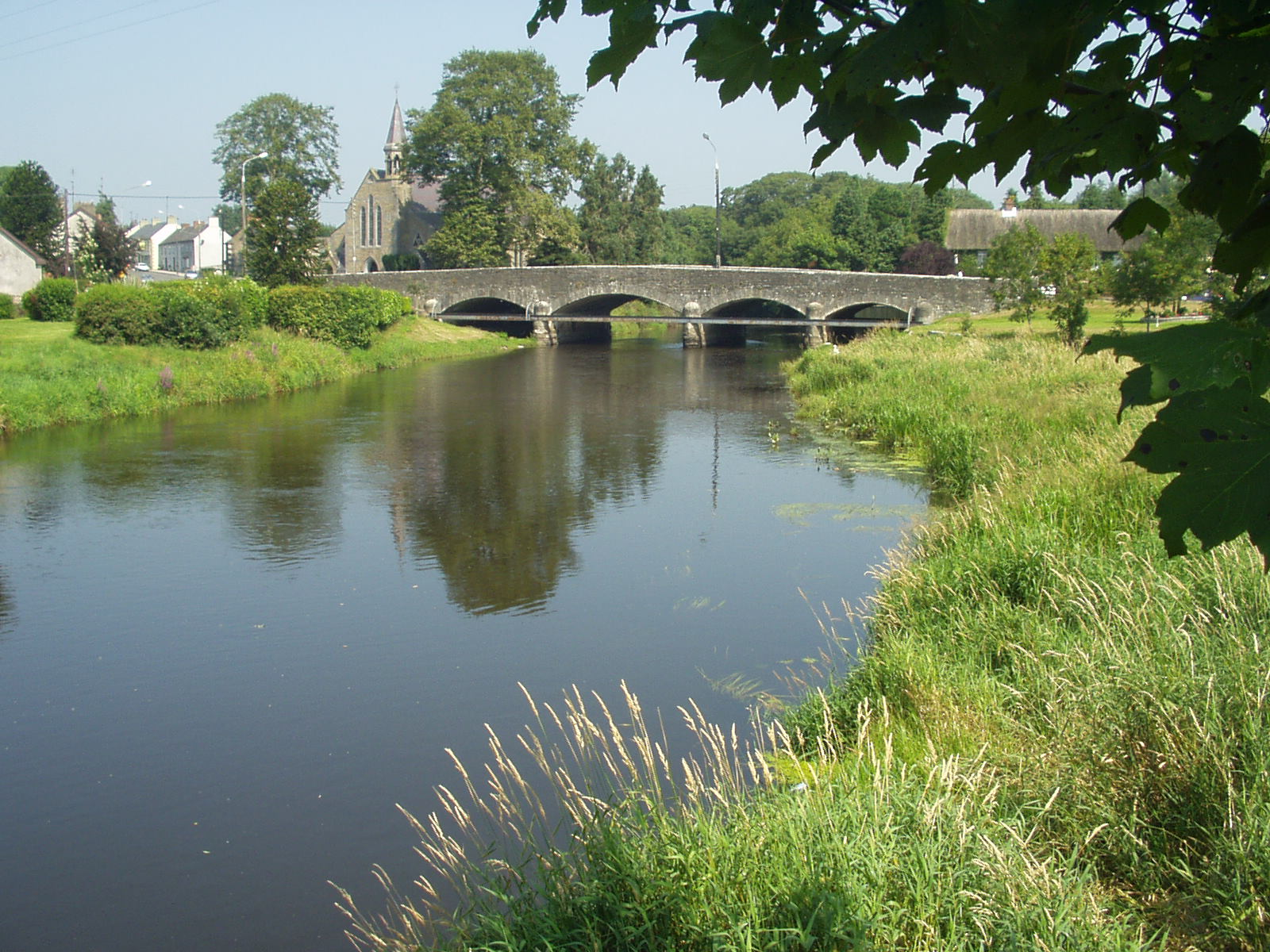
- River Annalee, Butlersbridge

- Location in Ireland
- Coordinates: 54°2′37″N 7°22′37″W
- Country: Ireland
- Province: Ulster
- County: Cavan

Population (2022)
  - Total: 271
- Irish Grid Reference: H446110

Butlersbridge (Irish: Droichead an Bhuitléaraigh), also Butler's Bridge, is a village in County Cavan in Ireland, 5 km (3 mi) north of Cavan town just off the N3 national primary road. It was previously a through-point on the N3, but was bypassed in 1999. The bridge in the village crosses the River Annalee, a tributary of the River Erne. Butlersbridge Church is dedicated to the local St. Aiden. It is about 9 km (6 mi) via the N54 to the border with County Fermanagh in Northern Ireland.

== History ==
The history of the Butlersbridge dates back around 6000 years to the Neolithic when farming arrived. The area fell within the domains of the O’Reilly clan until the Plantation of Ulster started in the early 17th Century which resulted in the O'Reillys having their lands confiscated. The lands around Butlersbridge were given to an English tenant called Sir Stephen Butler, after whom the town is named.

== St Aiden's Church ==
Butlersbridge's parish church is St Aidan's which was designed by the architect William Hague Jr. (1836–1899). It was built adjacent to the river Annalee on a site donated by the Earl of Lanesborough. Work commenced in 1860 and the church was dedicated on 14 June 1863. The church cost £1,440 to build. The two shades of limestone used to build the church are typical of Hague's designs.

== Annagh Lake ==
Annagh Lake is near Butlersbridge and forms part of the drainage system of the River Erne. The lake has a fishery which is stocked with both brown trout and rainbow trout.

== Sports ==
Butlersbridge has a GAA club, Butlersbridge Emmett's, which was founded in 1888. The club has won a number of Cavan Junior Championships at Gaelic football. They also won the Cavan Intermediate Championships in 2021.

== Folk village ==
In 1977, the owners of the Derragarra Inn in Butlersbridge created a folk village as a tourist attraction.

== Gallery ==
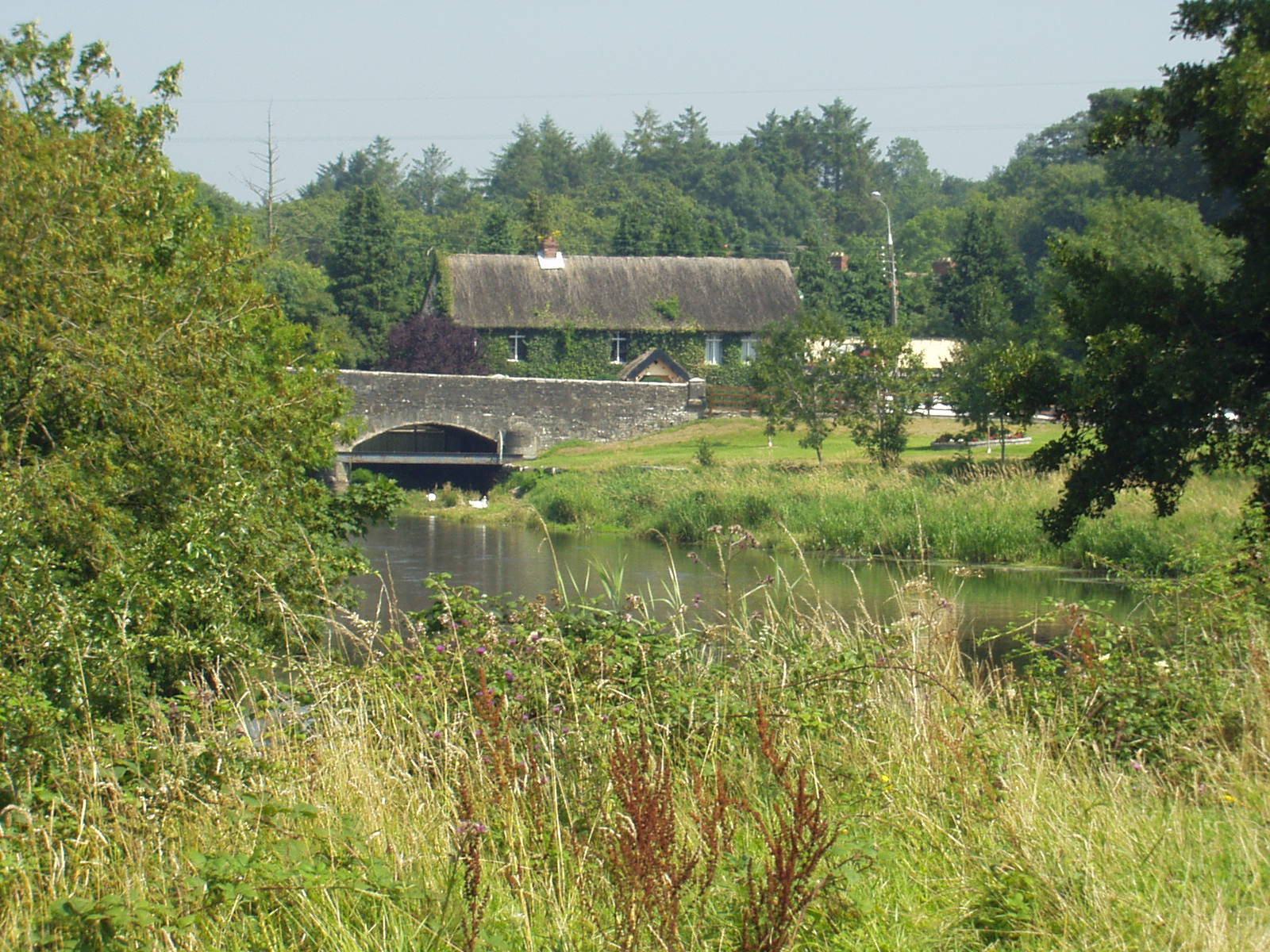
Butlersbridge

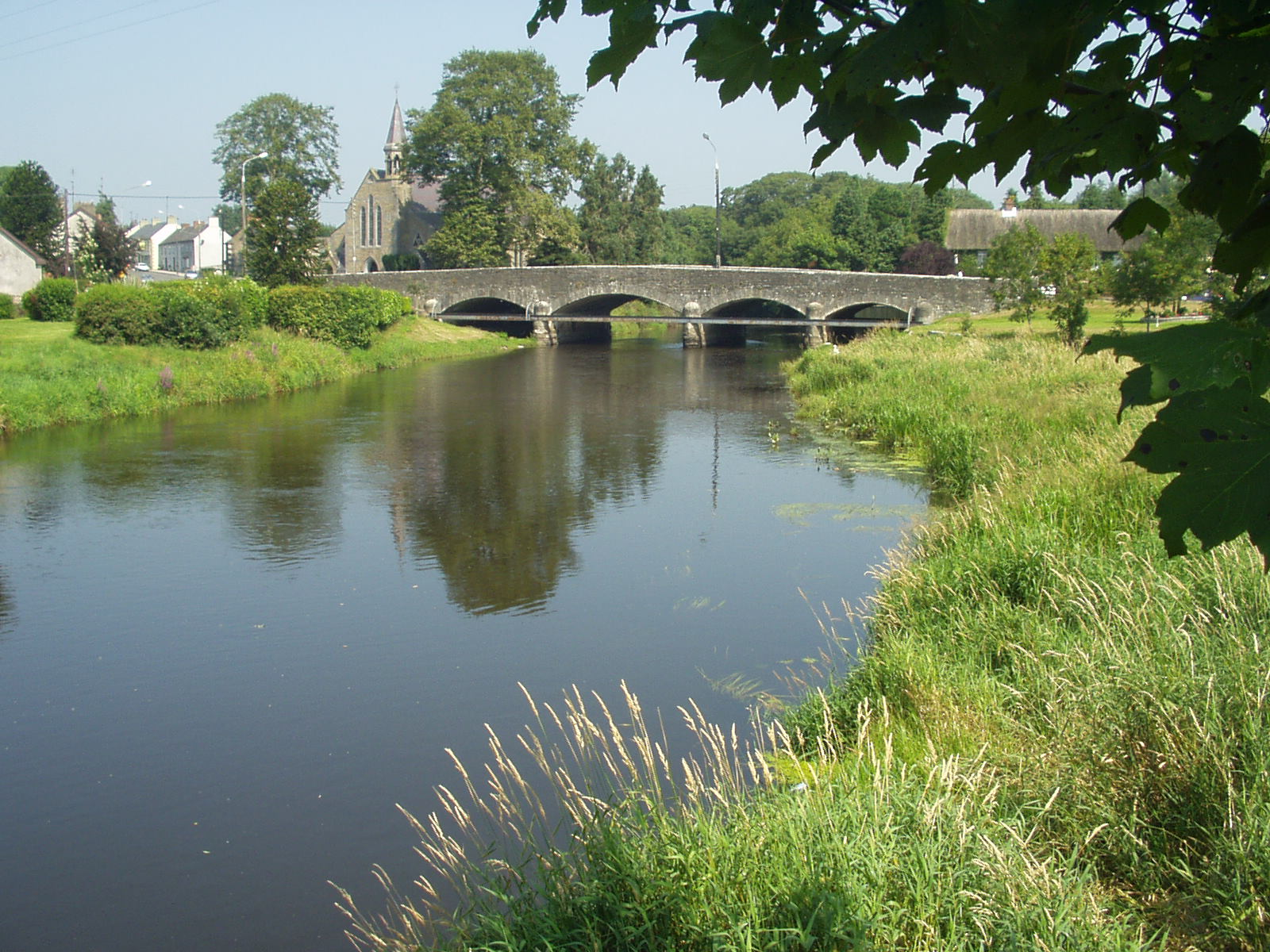
River Annalee at Butlersbridge

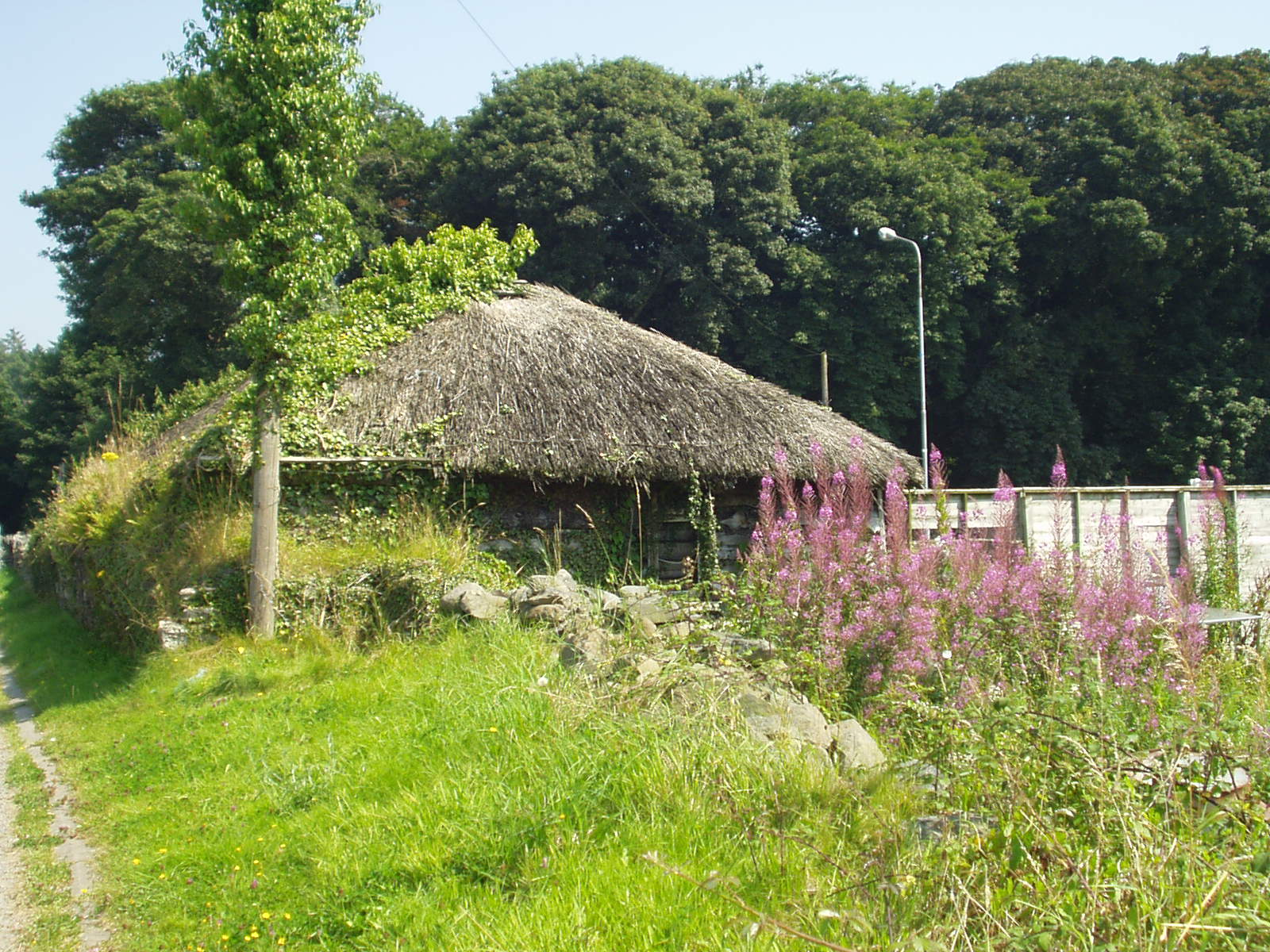
Cottage in Butlersbridge

== See also ==
- List of towns and villages in Ireland
