= Ballybay =

Town in County Monaghan, Ireland

Ballybay Béal Átha Beithe
- Town
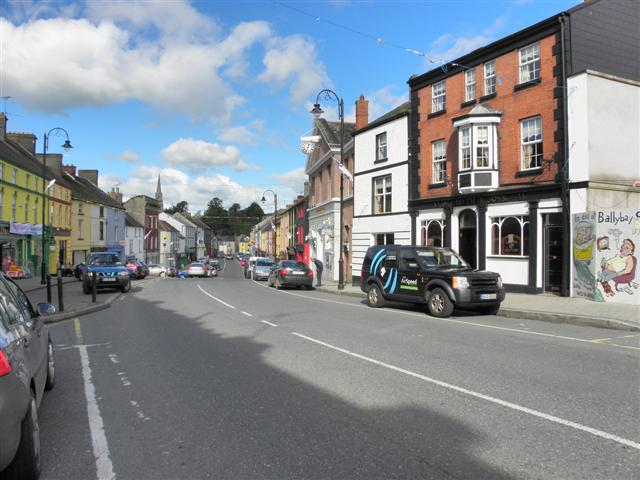
- Main Street

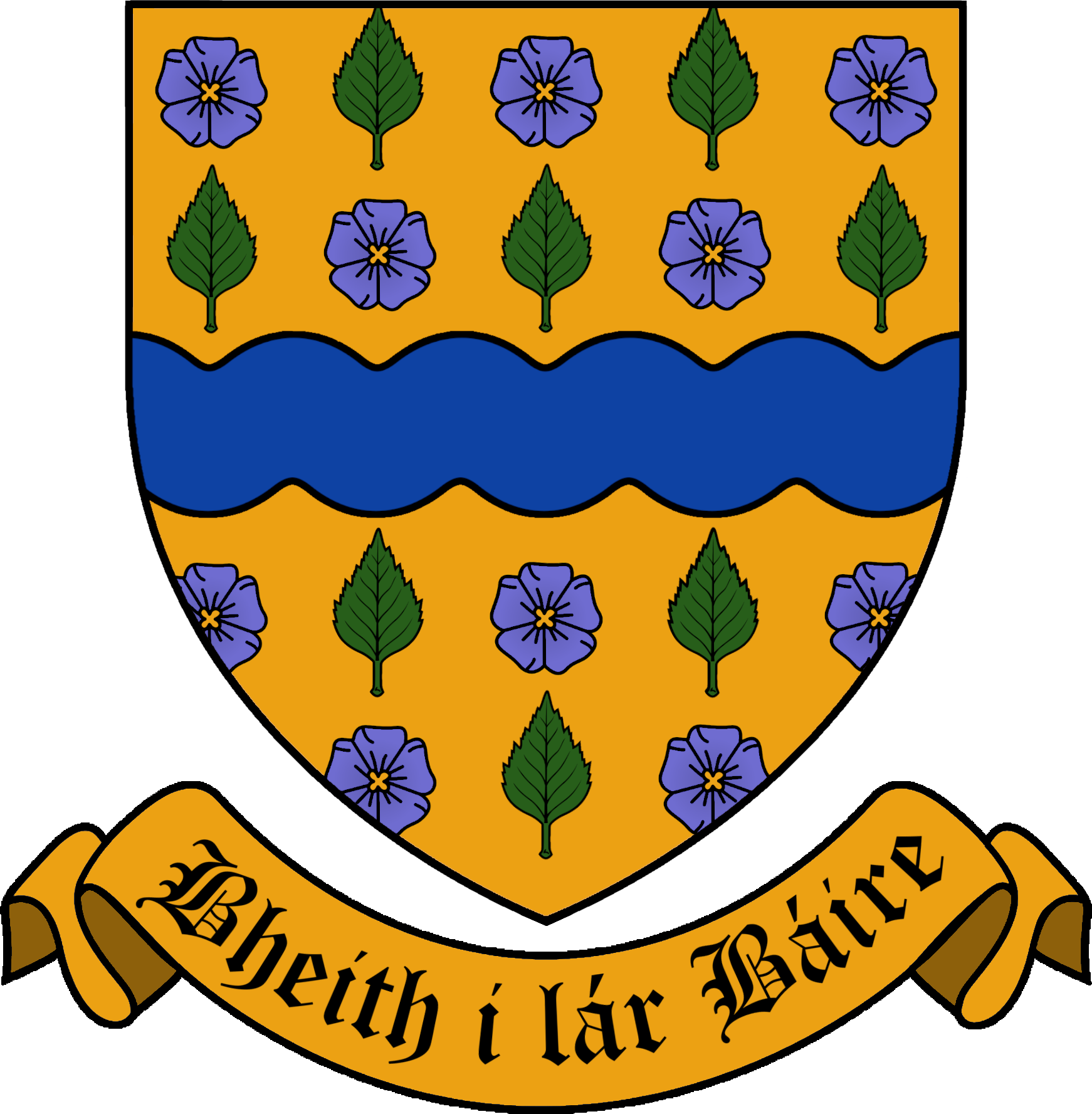
- Coat of arms
- Motto: Bheith i Lár Báire "be at the centre"
- Location in Ireland
- Coordinates: 54°07′46″N 6°54′11″W
- Country: Ireland
- Province: Ulster
- County: County Monaghan
- Elevation: 61 m (200 ft)

Population (2022)
  - Total: 1,329
- Time zone: UTC±0 (WET)
  - Summer (DST): UTC+1 (IST)
- Eircode routing key: A75
- Telephone area code: +353(0)42
- Irish Grid Reference: H743188

Ballybay (Irish: Béal Átha Beithe, meaning 'mouth of the ford of the birch') is a town and civil parish in County Monaghan, Ireland. The town is centred on the crossroads of the R183 and R162 roads.

== Geography ==
The town is the meeting point for roads going to Monaghan, Castleblayney, Carrickmacross and Clones. The town grew up from the convergence of the roads. The town is built beside a large lake, Lough Major (Irish: Lough Mór) and the smaller Lough Minor. The Dromore River also runs through the south of the town, past Pearse Brother's Football Grounds, and past the Riverdale Hotel.

== History ==
Ballybay, originally named Ballybea, was founded in the eighteenth century by members of the Jackson family. They worked in the linen industry, which was booming during this time. It was declining in an area such as Ballybay due to the mechanisation of the site, the power sail and the power of the steam boiler.

The Town Council was established in 1870. During the First World War, the town was established as a major horse trading post, supporting trades such as harness makers, blacksmiths, blacksmiths and nailers.

The town commissioners had meetings in 1871 with bank representatives, businessmen, and various people who were interested in the development of the town. In terms of town layout, water supply, street lighting and a waste management plan were established.

After that, markets and events were taking place in the centre of the town and there were goods such as linseed, a bag of corn, meat, horses and farm fruit.

== Buildings of note ==
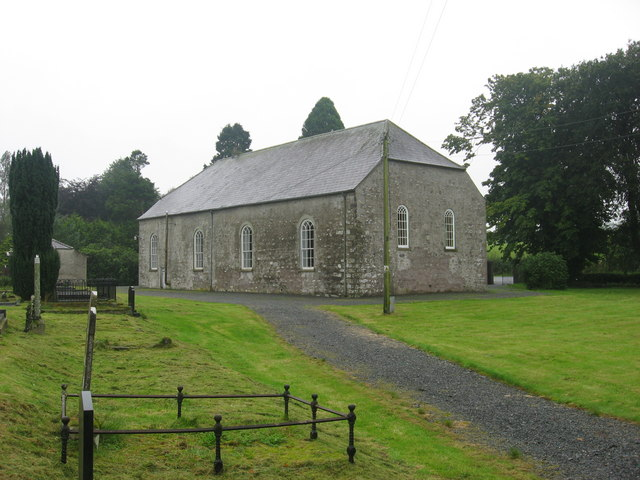
First Presbyterian Church, Ballybay was built in the late 18th century and expanded in the late 19th century

Ballybay Market House is a four-bay two-storey building built in 1848.

Ballybay also used to have a hotel, Riverdale, as well as Ballybay Community college, the local secondary school.

== Transport ==
=== Rail transport ===
Ballybay railway station opened on 17 July 1854, was closed to passenger traffic on 14 October 1957, and finally closed altogether on 1 January 1960. Part of the station office can be seen today. The railway line was opened in 1849 and extended west to Ballybay in 1854. After that, the railway system was named after the Northern Irish Railway and the Ulster Railway. It was called the Great Northern Railway (GNR). Emilie Leslie was involved in the planning of the railway. It was agreed that the station would be built to the south of the originally planned location and that the goods warehouse would be built to the east of the station house itself. The people were still using the train during the Second World War and more staff were hired at this time.

=== Coach/bus transport ===
Local Link route M2 links the village with Monaghan several times daily Mondays to Saturdays inclusive. Collins Coaches provide a daily service from the town to Dublin via Carrickmacross, Ardee and Slane. Bus Éireann route 162 serves the town on schooldays linking Ballybay to Doohamlet, Castleblayney, Newbliss, Clones and Monaghan.

== Tourism ==
Today the town welcomes tourists and bird watchers who frequent the town to make use of the newly renovated lake district built around the local Lough Major. The town is also a destination for fishermen who travel to the town to take part in various fishing competitions. Many tourists travel to The Ballybay Wetlands Centre, which is a popular area for birdwatchers and hikers.

== Sport ==
The local GAA club is Ballybay Pearse Brothers. The club's home ground is Pearse Park, located on the outskirts of the town. Since 1935, the club has won the Monaghan Senior Football Championship on 9 occasions, most recently in 2022. As of November 2019 Ballybay have 3 players on the Monaghan senior football panel.

== In popular culture ==
The family of singer-songwriter Holly Johnson, of the band Frankie Goes To Hollywood, came from Ballybay.

Singer-songwriter Tommy Makem wrote a lighthearted song about the town, "In the Town of Ballybay".

== Town twinning ==
=== Twin towns – Sister cities ===
Ballybay is twinned with the town of Osterhofen/Gergweis in Bavaria.

== See also ==
- List of towns and villages in Ireland
- Market Houses in Ireland
