= Monaghan Junior Football Championship =

Annual Gaelic football competition

Packie Boylan Cup
- Irish: Craobh Sóisear Peile Muineachán
- Code: Gaelic football
- Trophy: Liam Stirrat Cup
- No. of teams: Varies (2018 - 12)
- Title holders: Clones (th title)
- Sponsors: Universal Graphics
- Official website: monaghangaa.ie

The Monaghan Junior Football Championship (often referred to as the Monaghan JFC for short or the Universal Graphics Junior Football Championship for sponsorship reasons) is an annual Gaelic football competition contested by lower-tier Monaghan GAA clubs. The Monaghan County Board of the Gaelic Athletic Association has organised it since at least 1918.

Clones are the title holders (2022).

== Honours ==
The trophy presented to the winners is the Liam Stirrat Cup.

The winners of the Monaghan Junior Football Championship progress to the Ulster Junior Club Football Championship. They often do well there, with the likes of Blackhill, Emyvale, Monaghan Harps and Corduff Gaels among the clubs from Monaghan to win at least one Ulster Championship after winning the Monaghan Junior Football Championship. The winners can, in turn, go on to play in the All-Ireland Junior Club Football Championship.

The winners of the Monaghan Junior Football Championship receive the Packie Boylan Cup. Each year, the winner of the Monaghan Junior Football Championship is promoted, along with the Monaghan Junior Football League (JFL) winners, to the intermediate ranks and compete in the following year's Monaghan Intermediate Football Championship. There is no relegation from neither the JFC, nor the JFL, as there are 29 clubs in Monaghan, with ten clubs playing in both senior and intermediate ranks.

== List of finals ==
Year	Winner	Opponent
2024		
2023		
2022	Clones St. Tiarnach's	Killanny
2021	Sean McDermotts	Toome
2020	Aughnamullen	Sean McDermotts
2019	Blackhill	Drumhowan
2018	Emyvale	
2017	Currin	Sean McDermotts
2016	Blackhill	
2015	Rockcorry	Blackhill
2014	Drumhowan	Blackhill
2013	Emyvale	Blackhill
2012	Drumhowan	Emyvale
2011	Cremartin	
2010	Corduff Gaels	
2009	Emyvale	
2008	Drumhowan	Clones St. Tiarnach's
2007	Aughnamullen	
2006	Drumhowan	Rockcorry
2005	Monaghan Harps	
2004	Cremartin	
2003	Monaghan Harps	
2002	Corduff Gaels	
2001	Doohamlet	Killeevan Sarsfields
1992	Carrickmacross Emmets	
1983	Inniskeen Grattans	
1964	Carrickmacross Emmets	
1947	Clontibret O'Neills	
1918	Castleblayney Faughs	

== Wins listed by club ==
- Carrickmacross Emmets (2): 1964, 1992
- Castleblayney Faughs (1): 1918
- Clontibret O'Neills (1): 1947
- Inniskeen Grattans (1): 1983
- Monaghan Harps (2): 2003, 2005
