= Charles Joseph Fay =

Irish politician

Charles Joseph Fay, MP, JP (ca. 1842 – 1895), was an Irish politician. Initially a Liberal, he was the Home Rule League MP for County Cavan, elected for 1874 and 1880 holding his seat until the constituency was abolished in 1885.

In January, 1878 he was elected to the Statistical and Social Inquiry Society of Ireland. In March 1878 he was appointed to the Select Committee on the Irish Land Act 1870. In contrast to many fellow Home rulers, his opposition to the Irish Coercion Acts was reported as lacklustre.

He was the youngest of the four sons of Thomas Fay (b 1791) of Faybrook, Cootehill, County Cavan. His brother James-Henry Fay, J.P., was High Sheriff of Cavan from 23 Feb 1881 until 25 Jan 1882. In later life Fay had a residence at Granite Lodge, Kingstown. In September 1895, he went missing, having been last seen alive at Cootehill Fair. The following month he was found drowned beside the River Annalee. It is believed that he lost his way travelling home in the dark.

== Elections in the 1870s ==
1874 (General election)
Candidate	Party	Votes
Charles Joseph Fay	Home Rule League	elected
Joseph Gillis Biggar	Home Rule League	elected
Edward James Saunderson	Conservative	defeated

== Elections in the 1880s ==
9 April 1880 (General election)
Candidate	Party	Votes
Charles Joseph Fay	Home Rule League	3,097 - elected
Joseph Gillis Biggar	Home Rule League	3,061 - elected
Somerset Henry Maxwell	Conservative	2,233 - defeated
