= Monaghan Intermediate Football Championship =

Annual Gaelic football competition

- Code: Gaelic football
- Region: Monaghan (GAA)
- Trophy: Paddy O'Rourke Cup
- No. of teams: 10
- Title holders: Doohamlet O'Neills (4th title)
- Sponsors: McElvaneys Waste & Recycling
- Official website: Monaghan GAA

The Monaghan Intermediate Football Championship (often referred to as the Monaghan IFC for short or the McElvaney's Waste & Recycling Intermediate Football Championship for sponsorship reasons) is an annual Gaelic football competition contested by mid-tier Monaghan GAA clubs.

== Qualification for subsequent competitions ==
=== Ulster Intermediate Club Football Championship ===
The Monaghan IFC winner qualifies for the Ulster Intermediate Club Football Championship. It is the only team from County Monaghan to qualify for this competition. The Monaghan IFC winner may enter the Ulster Intermediate Club Football Championship at either the preliminary round or the quarter-final stage. For example, 2019 winner Magheracloone Mitchells won the Ulster IFC final. This was the first appearance by the Monaghan IFC winning club in an Ulster final since Donaghmoyne lost to Tyrone GAA club Pomeroy Plunketts in 2016. It was also the first Ulster IFC final win for a Monaghan club since 2013 winner Truagh Gaels.

=== All-Ireland Intermediate Club Football Championship ===
The Monaghan IFC winners — by winning the Ulster Intermediate Club Football Championship — may qualify for the All-Ireland Intermediate Club Football Championship, at which it would enter at the semi-final stage, providing it hasn't been drawn to face the British champions in the quarter-finals. For example, 2013 winner Truagh Gaels won the All-Ireland final at Croke Park. Likewise 2005 winner Inniskeen Grattans.

=== Monaghan Senior Football Championship ===
Each year, the winning club is promoted — alongside the Monaghan Intermediate Football League (IFL) winner — and competes in the following year's Monaghan Senior Football Championship. No relegation from the IFC exists, with the two lowest finishing teams in the IFL instead being relegated to the junior ranks for the following year.

== Trophy ==
The winning club receives the Paddy O'Rourke Cup, named after the Inniskeen Grattans clubman who served in various positions within club and county boards.

== Format ==
The competition uses a double-elimination format up until the semi-final stage, which is knockout.

Ten teams enter the competition, with four teams drawn into the Preliminary Round and the remaining six teams into Round 1A. The winners of the preliminary round game play each other in Round 1A, making up the fourth game in that round. The four winners in Round 1A then progress to Round 2A. At this stage, the four teams are drawn in two matches, with the two winners progressing to the Semi-Final stage.

The losers enter the 'back-door' route, with the two Preliminary Round losers, and three of the four Round 1A losers entering Round 1B. As five teams are eligible for Round 1B, one team receives a bye to Round 2B, with the remaining four teams drawn in two matches. The two winners of the Round 1B games progress to Round 2B, and joining them in Round 2B is the loser of the Round 1A clash involving the preliminary round winners. At this stage, again, the four teams are drawn in two matches with the two winners progressing to Round 3, where they face the losers of the Round 2A games. In Round 3, the four teams are drawn in two matches, with the two winners progressing to the Semi-Final stage.

== List of recent finals ==
Year	Winner	Score	Runner-up	Venue
2000	Inniskeen Grattans		Emyvale	
2001	Ballybay		Tyholland	
2002	Sean McDermotts		Carrickmacross	
2003	Aghabog		Doohamlet	
2004	Ballybay		Tyholland	
2005	Inniskeen Grattans		Doohamlet	
2006	Carrickmacross		Monaghan Harps	
2007	Tyholland	2-09 - 1-09	Truagh	
2008	Ballybay	0-15 - 0-08	Donaghmoyne	
2009	Monaghan Harps	1-10 (13) – (10) 0-10	Drumhowan	Clontibret
2010	Doohamlet O'Neill's	3-09 (18) – (09) 1-06	Tyholland	Clontibret
2011	Carrickmacross Emmets	1-11 (14) – (10) 1-07	Corduff Gaels	Clontibret
2012	Doohamlet O'Neills	0-12 (12) – (11) 1-08	Tyholland	Clontibret
2013	Truagh Gaels	1-14 (17) – (14) 1-11	Tyholland	Clontibret
2014	Inniskeen Grattans	0-11 (11) – (10) 1-07	Donaghmoyne Fontenoys	Clontibret
2015	Doohamlet O'Neill's	1-11 (14) – (12) 0-12	Carrickmacross Emmets	Castleblayney
2016	Donaghmoyne Fontenoys	0-10 (10) – (09) 1-06	Rockcorry	Clontibret
2017	Carrickmacross Emmets	3-12 (21) – (11) 1-08	Aughnamullen Sarsfields	Inniskeen
2018	Doohamlet O'Neills	0-09 (09) – (08) 0-08	Sean McDermotts	Clontibret
2019	Magheracloone Mitchells	2-17 (23) – (15) 1-12	Donaghmoyne Fontenoys	Inniskeen
2020	Monaghan Harps	1-16 (19) – (16) 2-10	Cremartin	Clones
2021	Donaghmoyne		Aughnamullen	
2022	Corduff Gaels	2-04 (10) – (9) 0-09	Magheracloone Mitchells	Inniskeen
2023	Killanny			
2024	Magheracloone Mitchells			
2025	Carrickmacross Emmets			

== Wins listed by club ==
	Team	Winners	Years	Runner-up	Years
1	Doohamlet O'Neills	4	2018, 2015, 2012, 2010	2	2005, 2003
1	Inniskeen Grattans	4	2014, 2005, 2000, 1994	1	1998
1	Monaghan Harps	4	2020, 2009, 1999, 1990	2	2006, 1994
2	Carrickmacross Emmets	3	2017, 2011, 2006	2	2015, 2002
2	Donaghmoyne Fontenoys	3	2021, 2016, 1996	3	2019, 2014, 2008
2	Ballybay	3	2008, 2004, 2001		
3	Sean McDermotts	1	2002	1	2018
3	Tyholland	1	2007	6	2013, 2012, 2010, 2004, 2001, 1999
3	Truagh Gaels	1	2013	1	2007
3	Magheracloone Mitchells	1	2019	1	2022
3	Corduff Gaels	1	2022	1	2011
N/A	Aughnamullen Sarsfields	2	2021, 2017		
N/A	Rockcorry	1	2016		
N/A	Drumhowan	1	2009		
N/A	Cremartin	1	2020		
