= R193 road (Ireland) =

Road in Ireland

R193 road
- Bóthar R193
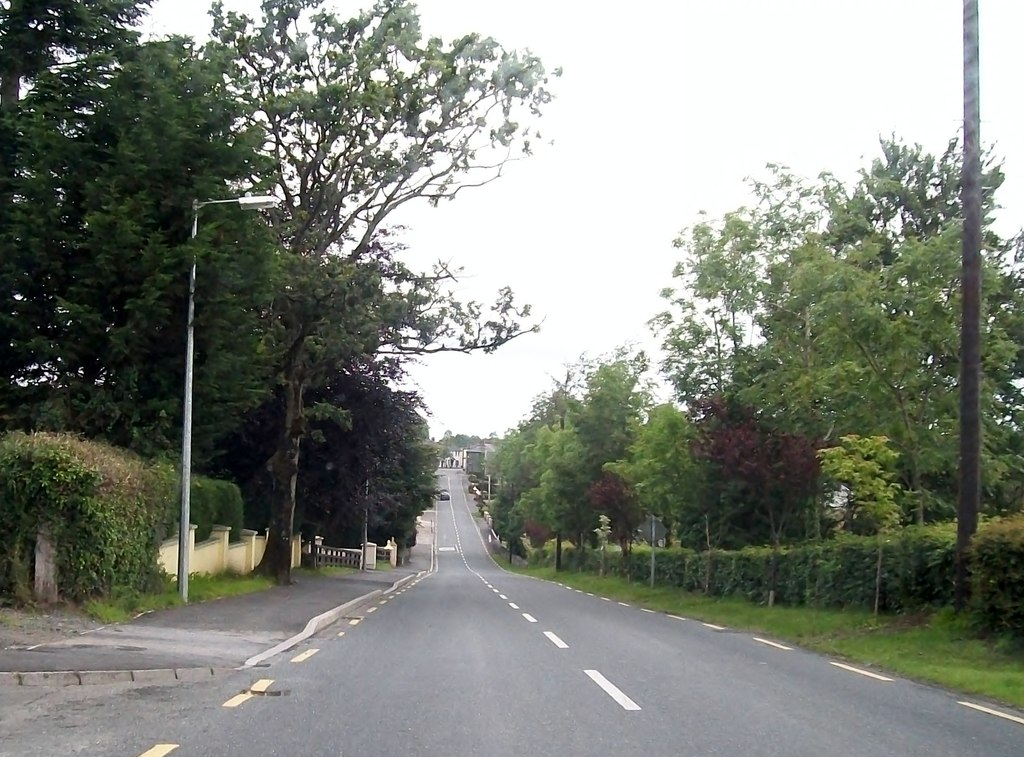
- R193 at Rockcorry

Route information
- Length: 3.4 km (2.1 mi)

Location
- Country: Ireland
- Primary destinations: County Monaghan; leaves the R190 road at Corfad; Terminates at the junction with the R188 road at Rockcorry

Highway system
- Roads in Ireland; Motorways; Primary; Secondary; Regional

The R193 road is a regional road in Ireland which links Rockcorry with the R190 regional road in County Monaghan. The road is 3.4 km (2.1 mi) long.

== See also ==
- Roads in Ireland
- National primary road
- National secondary road
