= Monaghan Harps GAA =

Sports club in County Monaghan, Ireland

Monaghan Harps
- Cláirsigh Mhuineacháin
- Founded: 1905
- County: Monaghan
- Colours: Green and White
- Grounds: Gavan Duffy Park, Monaghan

Playing kits

Monaghan Harps (Irish: Cláirsigh Mhuineacháin) is a Gaelic games club based in the Irish town of Monaghan in County Monaghan. It is a member of the Monaghan GAA branch of the Gaelic Athletic Association. Founded in 1905, the club fields men's and ladies' football teams, as well as hurling and handball. Home games are played at Gavan Duffy Park in Monaghan Town.

The club last won a Monaghan Senior Football Championship title in 1923.

== History ==
The club was founded in 1905, in the town of Monaghan, County Monaghan. It competes at club level in the county championships and leagues.

Seán Kelly, the then GAA's president, opened a two-pitch complex and clubhouse on 27 August 2005, after 14 years of work, with Rory O'Hanlon, the then Ceann Comhairle of Dáil Éireann, also in attendance.

The Gavan Duffy Park club grounds received permission for upgrades, including floodlights, in 2023.

In the years leading up to 2025, the club's demographics expanded/changed to become more diverse, and had more children staying with the club beyond 12 years. The club received "Green Club" status in 2025, becoming the first in County Monaghan to achieve this award. "Green club" status reflects a club's commitment towards sustainability.

== Honours ==
- Ulster Junior Club Football Championship (1): 2003, 2005
- Monaghan Senior Football Championship (3): 1911, 1922, 1923 (runner-up: 1907, 1910, 1980, 1987, 1991, 2015)
- Monaghan Intermediate Football Championship (5): 1954, 1990, 1999, 2009, 2020, (runner-up: 1994, 2006)
- Monaghan Junior Football Championship (2): 2003, 2005
- Monaghan Junior Hurling Championship (2): 2021, 2025
- Ulster Ladies' Senior Club Football Championship (1): 2000 (runner-up: 2001)
- All-Ireland Ladies' Club Football Championship (1): 2000
