= A25 road (Northern Ireland) =

Road in Northern Ireland

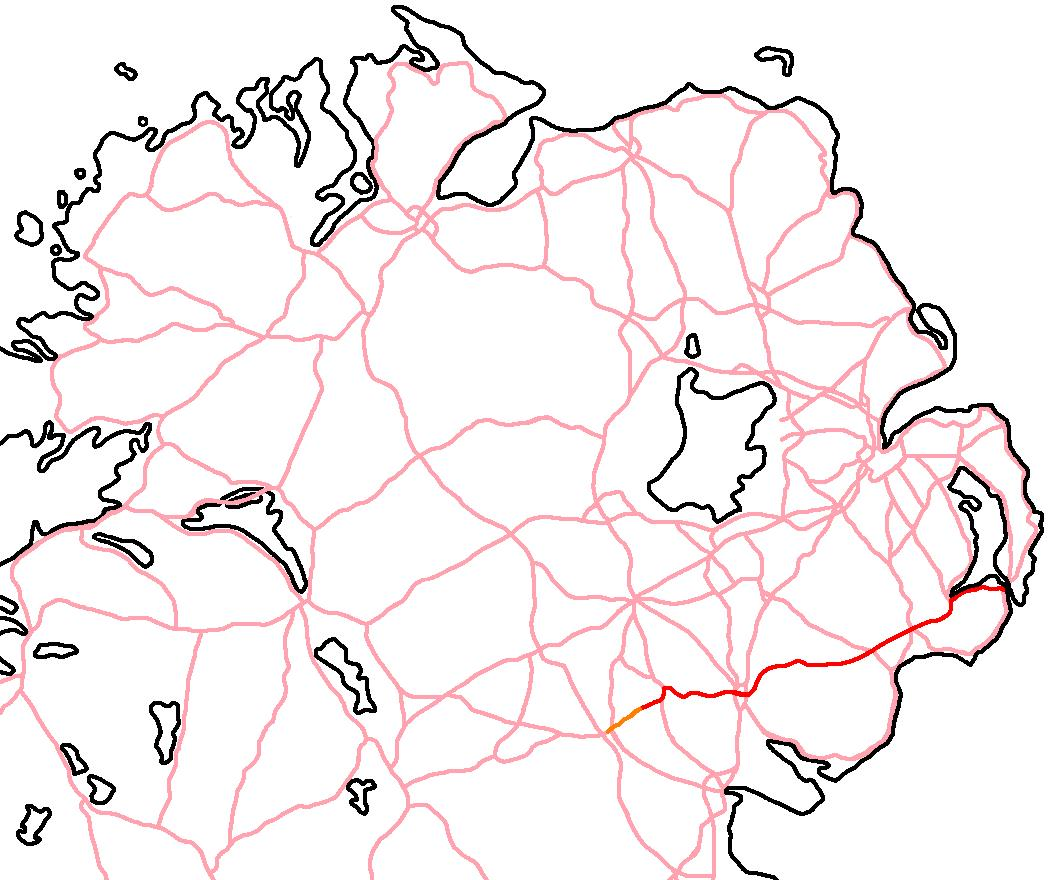
The route of the A25 in red from Strangford village, Co. Down (54.3706°N 5.5563°W), to near Castleblayney, Co. Monaghan (54.1632°N 6.6344°W). The R182 (lying as it does in the Republic) appears in orange.

The A25 is the name given to the sections of the main route connecting Strangford with Castleblayney that lie in Northern Ireland. It is a road of regional importance, serving much of south Armagh and south Down. The road commences in the village of Strangford, on the shores of Strangford Lough, from which the Portaferry – Strangford Ferry service transports vehicles to Portaferry on the Ards peninsula. The entirety of the route is 61.2 miles, of which 54.5 miles are located north of the border, forming the A25 – the remaining 6.7 miles form the R182 in the Republic of Ireland.

The route has strategic importance, as it connects Downpatrick, Newcastle and Castlewellan with Newry, and thus provides a link with Dublin. Between Castlewellan and Newry, the route passes through rural villages such as Kilcoo and Rathfriland, which would be considered part of the Mourne Country, due to their proximity to the mountains of the same name. Both Castlewellan Forest Park and Tollymore Forest Park are located nearby, as is the afore mentioned seaside resort of Newcastle. The route also passes through the Lecale district.

The A25 travels through Newry in the Rathfriland Road, Monaghan Street and Camlough Road, passing through the heart of the city, and northwestwards towards the city's railway station (located on the Dublin-Belfast mainline). The railway bridge over the A25 is known as the Egyptian Arch and was featured on a Royal Mint coin issued in 2006. The Newry bypass (A1) also bridges above the Camlough Road. The junction between the two routes is currently being upgraded to have motorway characteristics as part of Newry's new bypass scheme (from Cloghoge Roundabout to the Belfast Road).

On the western side of the city, the road becomes the principal transport corridor serving much of south Armagh; running near Bessbrook, through Camlough, Belleek and Newtownhamilton. This area, like the Mournes, is an Area of Outstanding Natural Beauty, and passes near Camlough Lake.
