= Drumhowan GAA =

Gaelic football club

Drumhowan
- Druim Shamhain
- Founded: 1953
- County: Monaghan
- Colours: Gold and Blue
- Grounds: Páirc Mhic Eoin

Playing kits
Standard colours

Drumhowan Geraldines is a Gaelic football club located in rural County Monaghan, Ireland.

== History ==
The club was founded in 1953, and won the Monaghan Junior Football Championship for the first time in 1960. Drumhowan won the junior championship again in 1991, before winning their first Monaghan Intermediate Football Championship in 1993, before winning it again in 1997. The club's third junior title was won in 2006.

After winning their fourth junior title in 2008, Drumhowan reached the final of the Ulster Junior Club Football Championship. Drumhowan were comfortable winners in the final with a 5–10 to 0–5 win over Lissan. Drumhowan lost the All-Ireland semi-final to eventual champions Skellig Rangers.

Drumhowan were junior champions again in 2012, and won it most recently in 2014.

== Honours ==
- Monaghan Intermediate Football Championship (2): 1993, 1997
- Ulster Junior Club Football Championship (1): 2008
- Monaghan Junior Football Championship (7): 1960, 1991, 2006, 2008, 2012, 2014, 2024
