= R162 road (Ireland) =

Road in Ireland

R162 road
- Bóthar R162
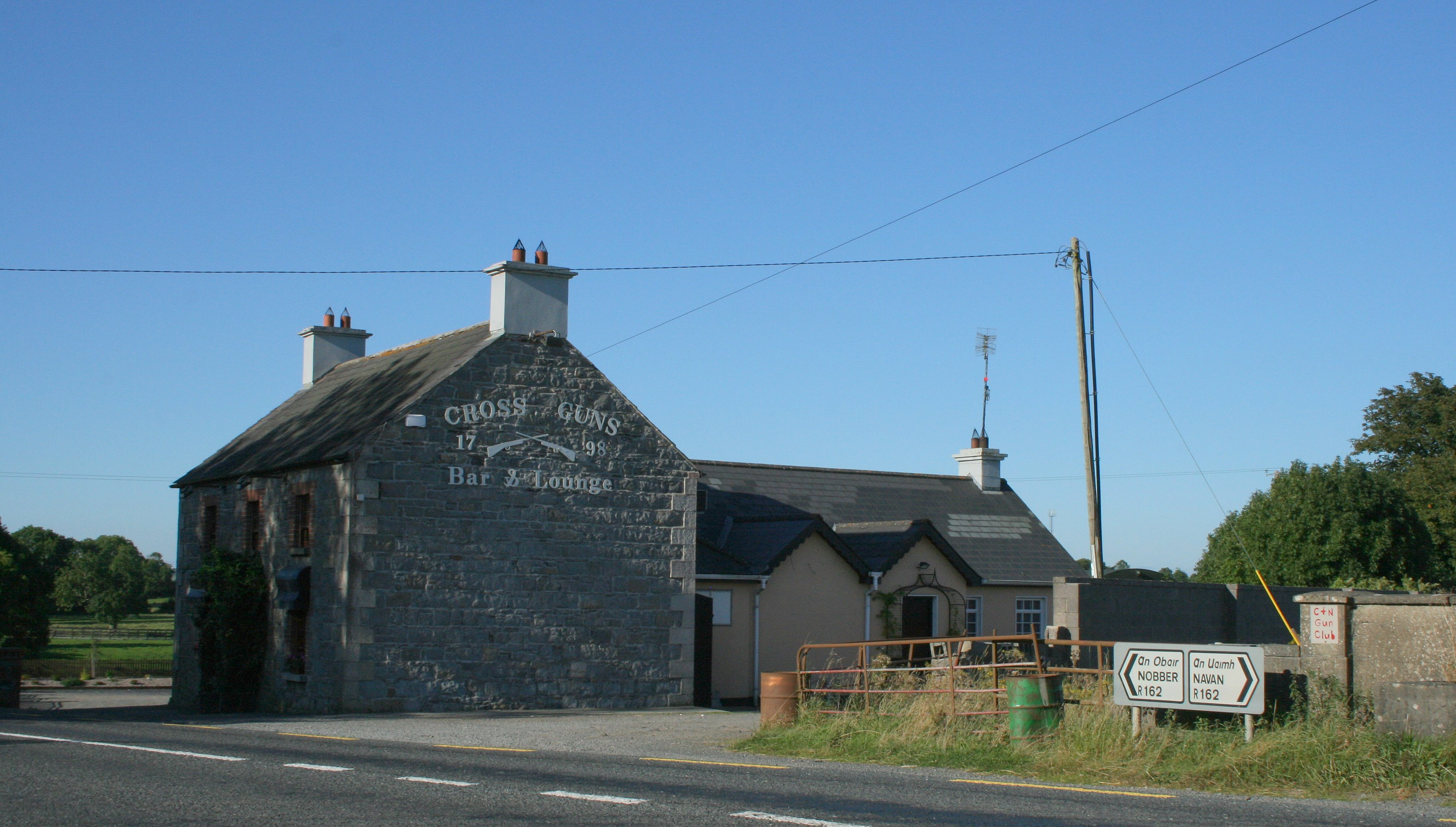
- Cross Guns Pub on the R162 in County Meath

Route information
- Length: 80 km (50 mi)

Location
- Country: Ireland
- Primary destinations: County Monaghan; Monaghan - starts at junction with the N54; (R188); (R184); Ballybay - (R183); (R180); (R190); County Cavan; (R192); Shercock - (R178); Kingscourt - (R164); (R165); County Meath; Nobber; +N52; -N52; Wilkinstown; Kilberry - (R163); Navan Racecourse; Navan - terminates at the R147

Highway system
- Roads in Ireland; Motorways; Primary; Secondary; Regional

The R162 road is a regional road in Ireland, linking Monaghan Town to Navan, County Meath. The route is 80 km (50 mi) long.

== Route ==
Northwest to southeast the route starts in at a junction with the N54 in Monaghan, County Monaghan. It continues southwards through Ballybay before crossing into County Cavan at Shercock.

It veers southwest through Kingscourt and enters County Meath, passing through Nobber. South of Nobber the N52 National secondary road joins it from the west and leaves eastwards at a staggered junction. (This is unusual in the R162 regional road has priority and also a much higher standard of road than the National route).

It passes southwards through Wilkinstown, Kilberry and passes Navan Racecourse before terminating in Navan at the R147.

== See also ==
- Roads in Ireland
- National primary road
- National secondary road
