= Belleeks =

Village and townland in County Armagh, Northern Ireland

Coordinates: 54.1667°N 6.483333°W

Belleeks: Irish: Béal Leice
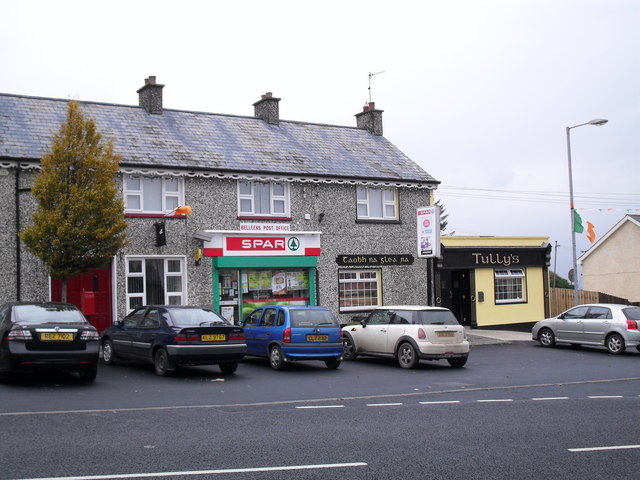
- Belleeks Post Office

- Location within Northern Ireland
- Population: 375 (2011)
- Irish grid reference: H987272
- District: Newry, Mourne and Down
- County: County Armagh
- Country: Northern Ireland
- Sovereign state: United Kingdom
- Post town: NEWRY
- Postcode district: BT35
- Dialling code: 028
- UK Parliament: Newry & Armagh
- NI Assembly: Newry & Armagh

Belleeks (from Irish Béal Leice, meaning 'ford-mouth of the flagstone') is a small village and townland in south County Armagh, Northern Ireland. The 2011 Census reported a population of 375. It lies within the Newry, Mourne and Down District Council area and the historic barony of Upper Fews.

== Location ==
Belleeks lies between the villages of Camlough and Newtownhamilton, on the A25 between Newtownhamilton and Newry. The nearest large town is Newry, approximately 7 miles to the east, and Whitecross is the nearest settlement, approximately 2 miles to the north. Belleeks lies in the townland of Belleeks Lower.

== Demography ==
At the time of the 2001 census, returns for the Belleeks-Blackrock-Tullyah electoral area, reported that:

- 26.0% were under 16 years old, and 12.6% were aged 60 and above
- The average age of a resident of the village was 30.8 years old
- 46.3% of the population was male and 53.7% was female
- 95.5% were from a Catholic Community Background
- 4.5% were from a Protestant or 'Other Christian' community background
- 13.7% had degree-level or higher qualifications
- 56.5% were economically active, 43.5% were economically inactive
- 6.7% were unemployed, of these 42.9% were long-term unemployed
- 68.3 stated that their health was 'good'
- 3.22 was the average family size
- 81.8% of households reported they had access to a private motor vehicle
- 75.9% of homes were owner-occupied, and 25.5% were owned outright.

== Features and economy ==
Saint Laurence O'Toole's Roman Catholic Church sits in a prominent location above the village, whilst a Church of Ireland church and Orange Hall lie between Belleeks and Whitecross. The village has two public houses, a small store, a part-time factory and a public common in the village centre. The village has developed from a linear settlement along the A25 as late as the 1960s, with the addition of five private and local authority housing developments since the 1970s.

Most residents work away from the village. The largest local industry remaining is agriculture. Belleeks is served by the number 44 Ulsterbus service from Newry to Newtownhamilton several times daily and the number 40 service between Newry and Whitecross.

== Education ==
There are two primary schools in or near the village: St. Brigid's Primary School and St. Laurence O'Toole's Primary School. Residents' secondary schooling occurs primarily at St. Paul's High School in Bessbrook, Newtownhamilton or Newry.

== Sport ==
Belleeks has a Gaelic Athletic Club, Laurence O'Toole's (Cumann Lorcáin Uí Thuathail), which competes in underage and senior men's and ladies' football, Scor and other Armagh GAA competitions. The clubhouse is in Shaughan in the townland of Belleeks Upper.

== History ==
=== Early history ===
The area in which Belleeks is situated has been populated for thousands of years, but it contains less easily discernible prehistoric remains than are widely evident in other parts of South County Armagh. What was to become the village of Belleeks was once the site of a Tudor garrison, besieged and taken during the Great O'Neill's rebellion. The area to become the village was held in the estates of Hugh Boy O'Hanlon in 1641, one of the few Catholic gentry retaining substantial landholdings in County Armagh following the Plantation of Ulster, before the Rising of that year. Situated in the estates of the Earls of Gosford by the eighteenth century, the modern settlement largely owes its origins to the then-current earl, who, in the 1790s, created a planned village on the site. Before the Irish Land Acts, the Earls of Gosford retained a large Deerpark on the outskirts of the village, whose impressive 18th-century walls still bound the settlement to the east.

=== Pre-20th Century ===
By the early 19th century, a hamlet had developed at Belleeks along the Newtownhamilton-Newry road which branches off to Whitecross at Belleeks, Indeed, in February 1767 Sir Archibald Acheson was granted a patent to hold fairs in the village on the 3rd days of February, May, August and November every year, all bar which the February fair survived up until 1852.

Census returns between 1841 and 1851, during which the Famine occurred, show a decrease in the village and surrounding area's population of greater than one quarter over the ten years due to death and emigration. During the 19th century, however, the settlement acted as the commercial centre for the surrounding region, with residents of outlying districts and nearby villages bringing butter, cheese, and other produce to Belleeks for sales and export to Belfast and beyond.

=== The Troubles 1969-1998 ===
For more information on The Troubles, see The Troubles in Belleeks (Armagh), which includes a list of incidents in Belleeks during the Troubles resulting in two or more fatalities.

== See also ==
- List of villages in Northern Ireland
