= R189 road (Ireland) =

Road in Ireland

R189 road
- Bóthar R189

Route information
- Length: 25 km (16 mi)

Location
- Country: Ireland
- Primary destinations: County Monaghan; Monaghan Town - leaves the N54; Three Mile House; Newbliss - (R183); Doohat; nr Cootehill - terminates at the R188

Highway system
- Roads in Ireland; Motorways; Primary; Secondary; Regional

The R189 road is a regional road in Ireland, linking Monaghan Town to Cootehill. The route is 25 km (16 mi) long.

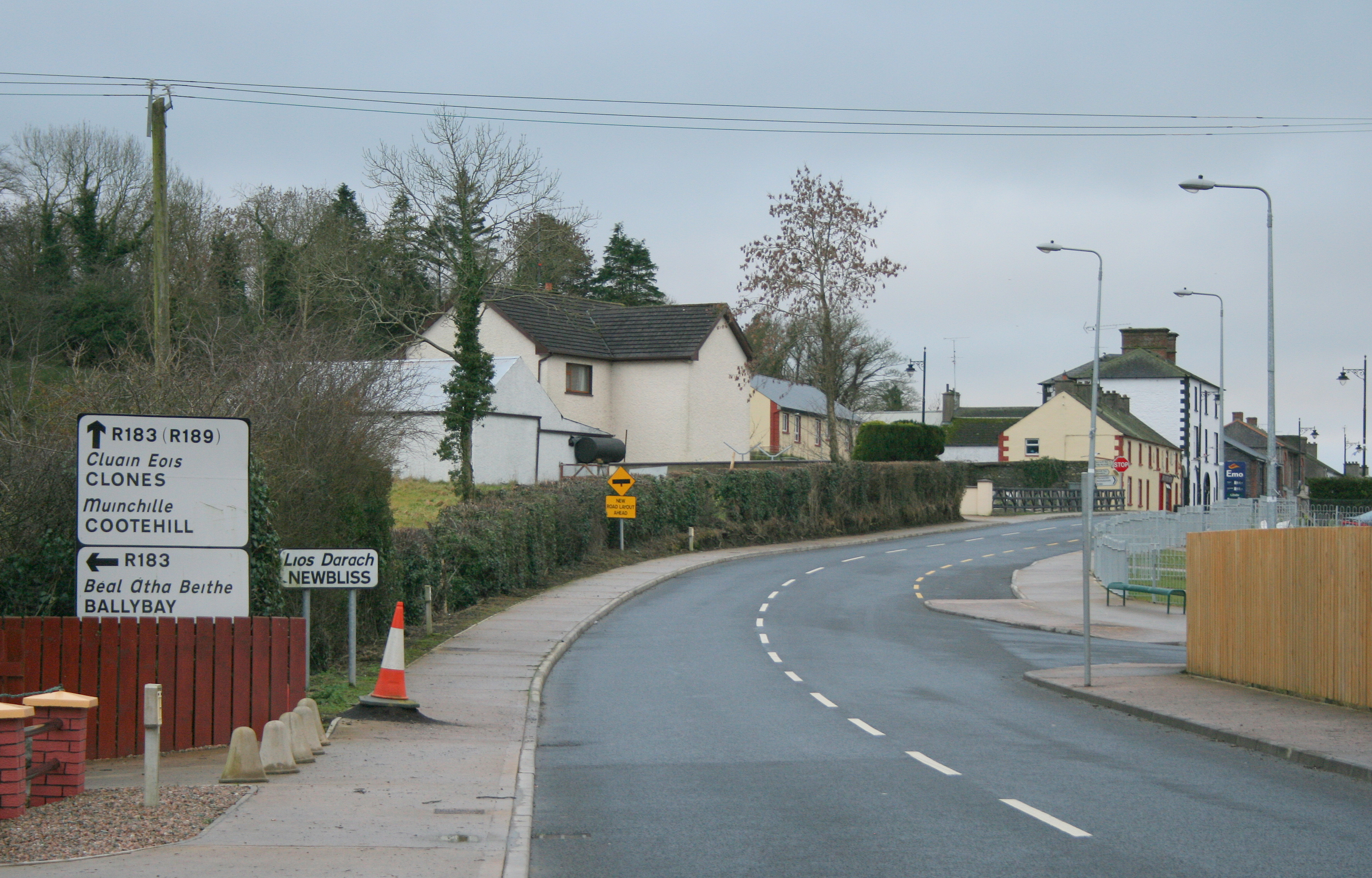
Direction sign approaching the R183 in Newbliss Clickable image: click a sign to go to its destination article

== Route ==
North to south the route starts at the N54 on the western edge of Monaghan Town. It heads southwest for 15 km to its junction with the R183 in Newbliss. It leaves Newbliss heading southeast for 10 km to its termination at the R188 two kilometers north of Cootehill, County Cavan. It remains in County Monaghan for its full length.

== See also ==
- Roads in Ireland
- National primary road
- National secondary road
