= Sean McDermotts GAA (Monaghan) =

Sean McDermotts
- Seán Mac Diarmada
- Founded: 1961
- County: Monaghan
- Nickname: The Seans
- Colours: Yellow and White
- Grounds: Páirc Sheáin Mhic Dhiarmada, Threemilehouse

Playing kits
Standard colours

Sean McDermotts is a Gaelic football club based in the village of Threemilehouse, County Monaghan, Ireland.

== History ==
The club was founded in 1961, and takes its name from 1916 Easter Rising leader Seán Mac Diarmada.

The club won their first intermediate title in 2002 by beating Carrickmacross in the final. The Seans would reach the final of the Ulster Intermediate Club Football Championship, beating Drumgoon by 0–14 to 0–7 to become the first Monaghan club to win the competition.

The club's most recent championship success came in 2021, winning the junior championship.

== Honours ==
- Ulster Intermediate Club Football Championship (1): 2002
- Monaghan Intermediate Football Championship (1): 2002
- Monaghan Junior Football Championship (5): 1969, 1977, 1981, 1990, 2021
