= River Annalee =

River in County Cavan, Ireland, tributary of the Erne

Coordinates: 54.048°N 7.410°W

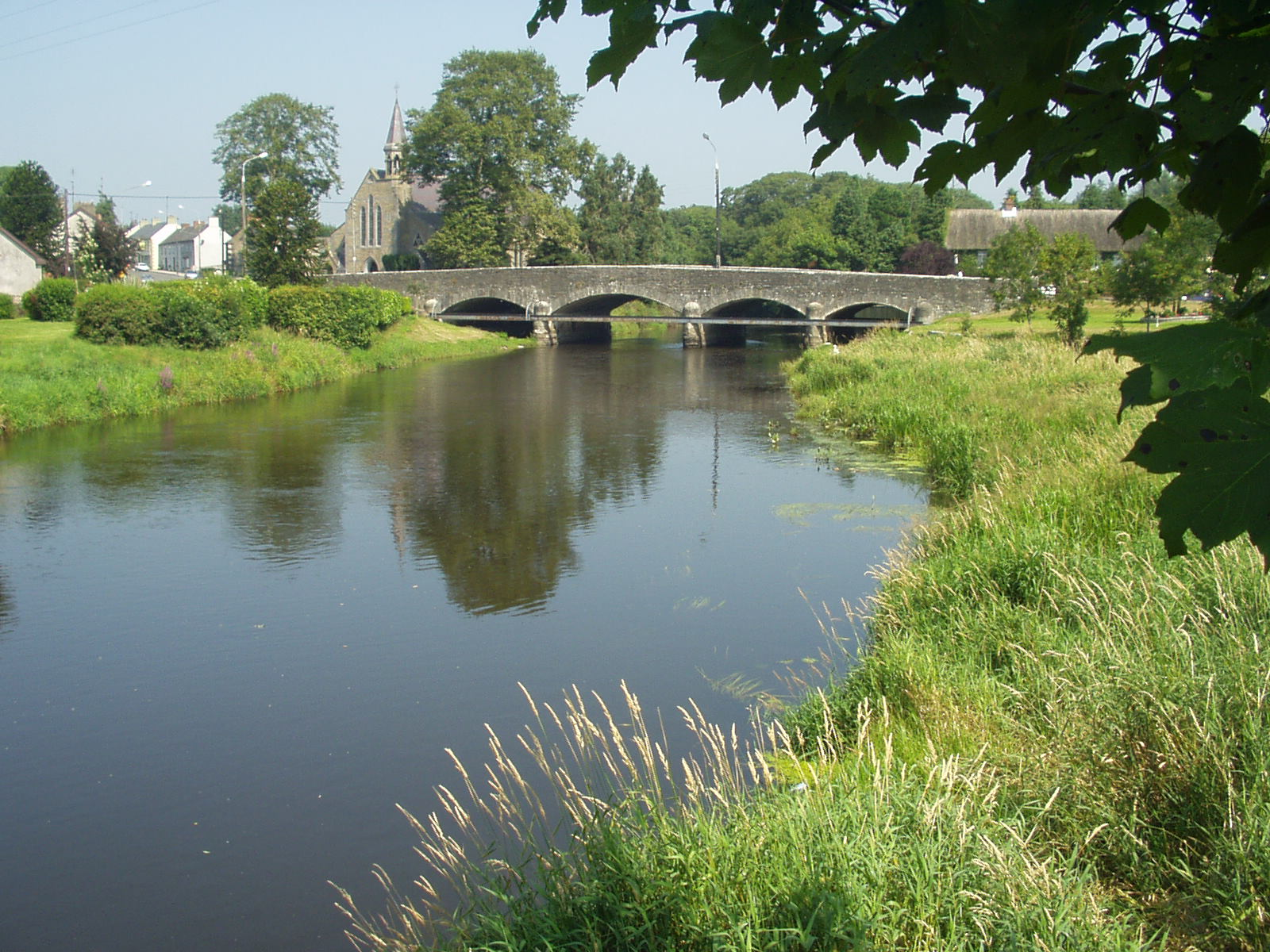
- River Annalee, Butlersbridge
- Native name: Abhainn na hEoghancha (Irish)

Location
- Country: Ireland

Physical characteristics
- Source
  - location: Lough Sillan, County Cavan
- Mouth
  - location: Atlantic Ocean via River Erne
- Length: 67.19 km (41.75 mi)
- Basin size: 522 km^{2} (202 mi^{2})

The River Annalee (Irish: Abhainn na hEoghancha) is a river in County Cavan, Ireland.

== Course ==
The source of the approximately 60 km-long river is Lough Sillan near Shercock from which it flows westwards through Lough Tacker, and south of Cootehill, until it reaches Butlersbridge. To the west of the village the river then flows through a series of lakes, before its confluence with the River Erne.

=== Tributaries ===
The Bunnoe and Laragh Rivers are two main tributaries that join the river below Cootehill, where it is also joined by the Dromore River. Other tributaries include the Knappagh, Madabawn and Cavan Rivers.

=== Volumes ===
The flow or discharge of the river is measured in its lower reaches at Butlersbridge, river levels are also measured at Rathkenny and Derryheen Bridge. The catchment area to the gauging station at Butlersbridge is 774 square kilometres (299 mi^{2}), which with an annual average rainfall of 1,020 millimetres (40 in), yields an average flow of 13.7 cubic metres per second (480 cu ft/s). The maximum recorded flow between 1955 and 2012 was 107 cubic metres per second (3,800 cu ft/s) on 30 November 1995.

== Etymology ==
The Irish name for the river is Abhainn na hEoghanach, which originates from the name of the historical district to the north of the river known as An Eoghanach, a district sometimes anglicised as Owenagh. The anglicised name of the river derives from one of the townlands through which it flows, namely Annaghlee (Eanach Lao).

== Leisure ==
Fishing is quite popular at Deredis near Butlersbridge and upstream of Cootehill in the stretch below Knappagh Bridge. Catches include Perch, Pike, Roach and Bream with Trout to over 3 pounds being reported.

== History ==
In September 1895 Charles Joseph Fay, former Home Rule League MP for County Cavan, drowned in the River Annalee. It is believed that he lost his way in the dark, traveling home from Cootehill fair.
