= R181 road (Ireland) =

Road in Ireland

R181 road
- Bóthar R181
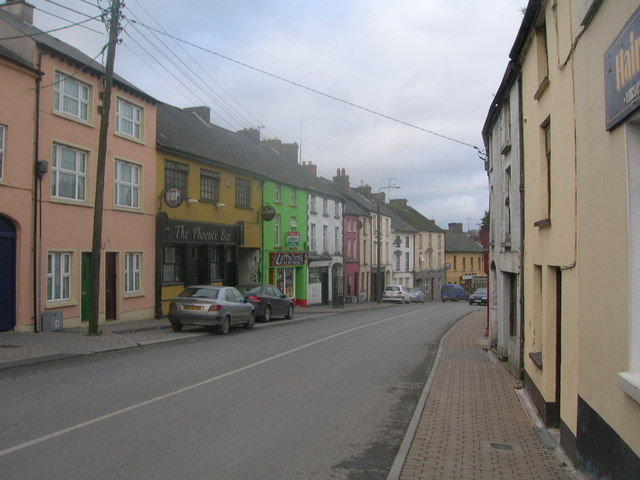
- Muckno Street, Castleblayney, on the R181

Route information
- Length: 28 km (17 mi)

Location
- Country: Ireland
- Primary destinations: County Monaghan; Castleblayney

Highway system
- Roads in Ireland; Motorways; Primary; Secondary; Regional

The R181 is a regional road in Ireland, running from the R162 near Shercock to the border with Northern Ireland near Keady, where it meets the B32.

== Route ==
The R181 begins on the R162 road near Shercock in County Cavan. It soon enters County Monaghan and continues to Castleblayney, where it runs along the main street before reaching a junction with the R182. It then heads to the border, which it crosses, becoming the B32, which continues to Keady.

== See also ==
- Roads in Ireland
- Motorways in Ireland
- National primary road
- Regional road
