= Lough Sillan =

Lake in County Cavan, Ireland

- Loch Saileán (Irish)
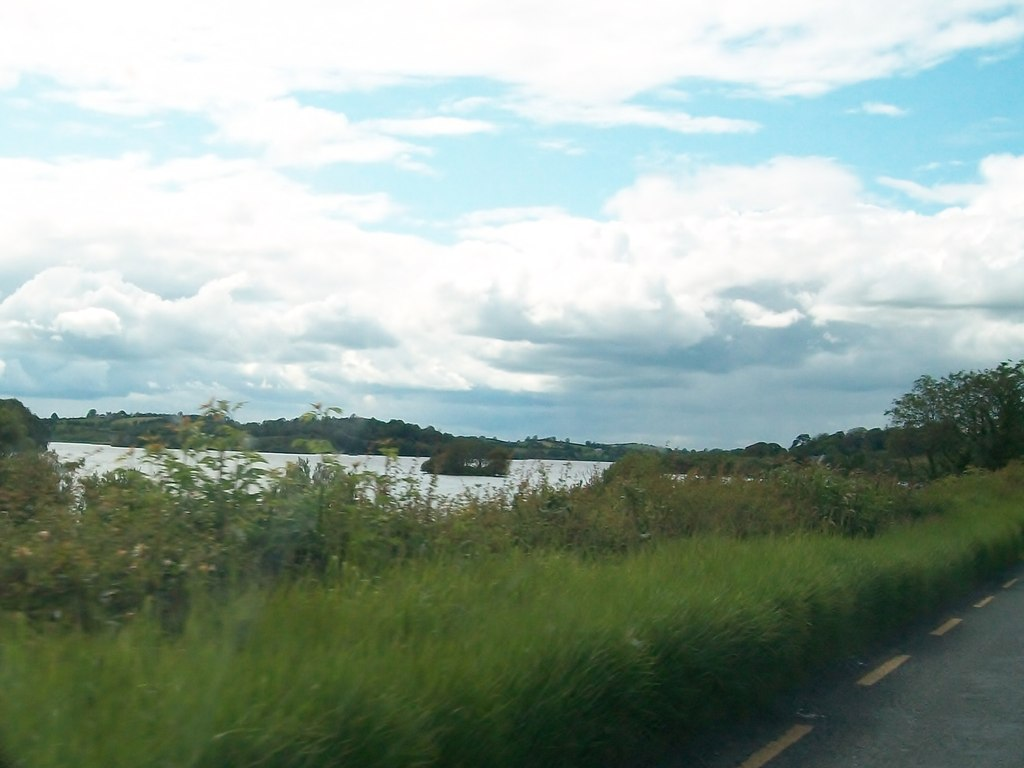
- As seen from the R162 road

- Location in Ireland
- Location: County Cavan
- Coordinates: 54°0′18″N 6°55′40″W
- Catchment area: 51.26 km^{2} (19.8 sq mi)
- Basin countries: Ireland
- Surface area: 1.62 km^{2} (0.63 sq mi)
- Surface elevation: 94 m (308 ft)

Lough Sillan (Irish: Loch Saileán) is a lough (lake) located near the town of Shercock in County Cavan, Ireland.

== History ==
On 25 July 1878, schoolmaster Michael McCabe took his pupils on a boat trip on Lough Sillan. After travelling a short distance the vessel capsized and sank, claiming 17 victims: the school principal, his wife, two school staff, and 13 pupils. It was one of Ireland's worst inland drowning tragedies. In July 2004, a plaque was unveiled at the lake shore adjacent to the path used by those who died.

== Facilities ==
There is a mobile home park and public playground on the lake shore, with a lodge, tennis court, and marina nearby. The lake is used for fishing and water sports.

== See also ==
- List of loughs in Ireland
