= Killanny Geraldines GAC =

Monaghan-based Gaelic games club

Killanny Geraldines GFC
- Cill Eanna
- Founded: 1889
- County: Monaghan
- Nickname: Killanny, Geraldines
- Colours: Black and Red
- Grounds: Pairc Eanna, Essexford
- Coordinates: 53°57′48.27″N 6°38′41.81″W

Playing kits
Standard colours

Killanny Geraldines are a Gaelic Athletic Association gaelic football team from Killanny parish, County Monaghan, Ireland. The club was founded in 1889. They have never won the Monaghan Senior Football Championship to date but have been runners-up on 3 occasions.

Killanny have a senior team and Minor, U-16, U-14, U-13, U-12, U-10 and U-9 teams. The senior squad are currently in the Senior Football League in Monaghan. The minor team have recently reached the club's first Division 1 championship final since 1976 and successfully brought Fergal O'Hanlon to Killanny.

== Pitch ==
The Killanny Geraldines' GAA club pitch is situated on the Killanny road close to Essexford in County Louth. Each summer crumb rubber or sand is put on the pitch to help harden the ground. The pitch is built on what was a bog hence the soft ground.

=== Team ===
The junior team has been in the lower reaches of Monaghan football for some time now. They recently won the Intermediate League Final and were subsequently promoted to the Senior League and Championship.

== History ==
In 2015 Killany promoted from the Junior Football League to the intermediate ranks. In 2016 they promoted again, this time to the senior ranks after beating Iniskeen in the intermediate league final.

As of 2021 Killanny are playing in the Intermediate league in Monaghan.
