= Newbliss =

Village in County Monaghan, Ireland

Newbliss Cúil Darach
- Village
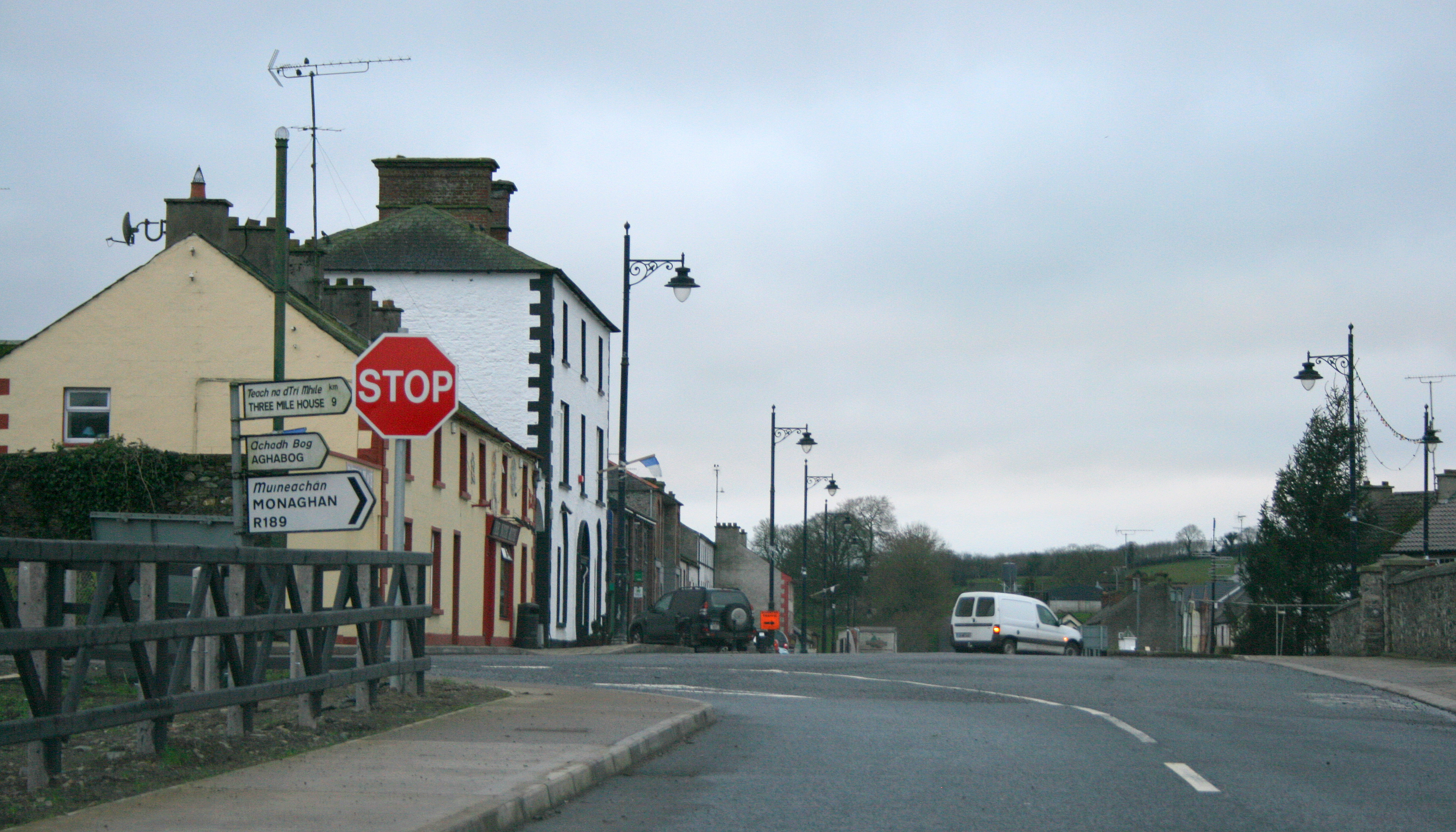
- Main Street, Newbliss

- Location in Ireland
- Coordinates: 54.158°N 7.137°W
- Country: Ireland
- Province: Ulster
- County: County Monaghan
- Barony: Dartree
- Elevation: 110 m (360 ft)

Population (2016)
  - Total: 327
- Irish Grid Reference: H561235

Newbliss (Irish: Cúil Darach, meaning 'corner of the oaktrees'), historically known as Lisdaragh (Irish: Lios Darach, meaning 'ringfort abounding in oak trees'), is a village and townland in the west of County Monaghan in Ireland. The village is 15 km south-west of Monaghan town where the R183 and R189 roads intersect.

== History ==
The lands around Newbliss were granted to Gilbert Nicholson by King Charles II in 1667. The Ker family, originally from Scotland, became associated with Newbliss around 1730, when Andrew Ker purchased the property from Nicholson’s representatives. Andrew’s son Robert built the family’s first residence there. The Ker family later helped develop the village and promoted its linen industry. Alexander Ker built Newbliss House in 1814.

By 1837, Newbliss was a market and post town with 497 inhabitants. It consisted mainly of one broad street containing 95 houses. A market was held on Saturdays, principally for flax and pigs, while monthly fairs mainly traded cattle and pigs. The village also had a market house, an inn, a school, a dispensary, and a Presbyterian meeting house built in 1816.

In the 2020s, the former Newbliss courthouse was redeveloped as an enterprise, digital, and community hub. Construction was supported by Ireland’s Rural Regeneration and Development Fund. The completed hub officially opened in 2026, providing workspace for businesses, entrepreneurs, and remote workers and supporting 40 jobs.

== Transport ==
The village is served by Local Link bus route 176 which runs between Cavan and Monaghan.

Rail services do not serve Newbliss, as Newbliss railway station (which opened in 1855) was closed for passenger traffic on 14 October 1957 and closed altogether on 1 January 1960.

== See also ==
- List of towns and villages in the Republic of Ireland
- Market Houses in the Republic of Ireland
