= Shercock =

Town in County Cavan, Ireland

Shercock Searcóg
- Town
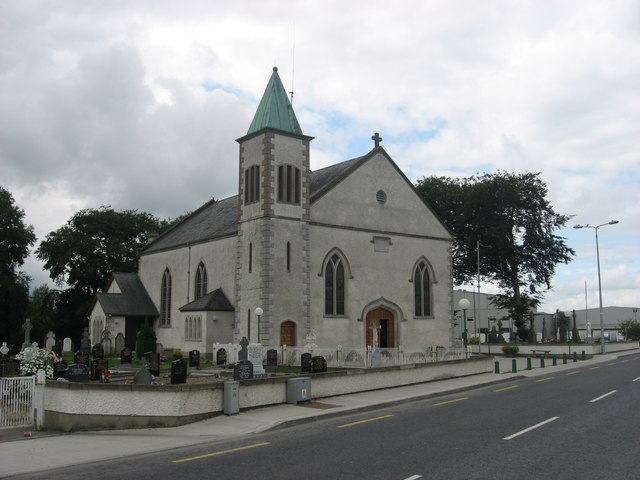
- St. Patrick's Church

- Location in Ireland
- Coordinates: 53°59′40″N 6°53′48″W
- Country: Ireland
- Province: Ulster
- County: County Cavan

Population (2022)
  - Total: 574
- Time zone: UTC±0 (WET)
  - Summer (DST): UTC+1 (IST)
- Eircode routing key: A81
- Telephone area code: +353(0)42
- Irish Grid Reference: H720057

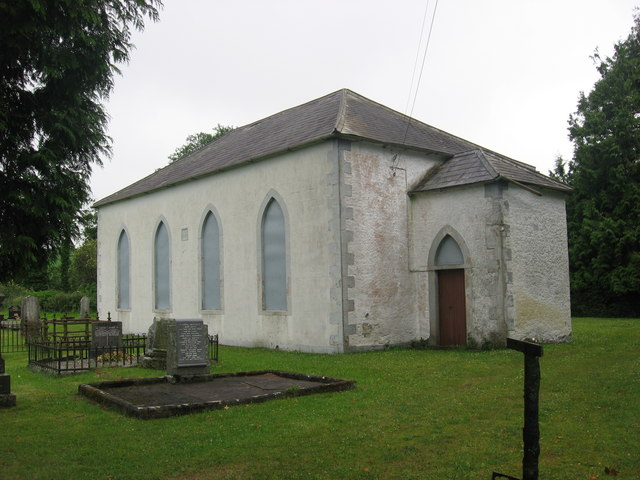
Glasleck Presbyterian church near Shercock

Shercock (/ˈʃɜːrˌkɒk/ SHUR-kok); Irish: Searcóg) is a small town and civil parish in the east of County Cavan, Ireland. As of the 2022 census, the population of the town was 574.

Shercock is 12 km west of Carrickmacross, at the intersection of the R162 and R178 regional roads. It sits on the shores of three lakes: Lough Sillan, Steepleton's Lake, and Muddy Lake. Lough Sillan is the largest of the three, covering approximately 162 hectares.

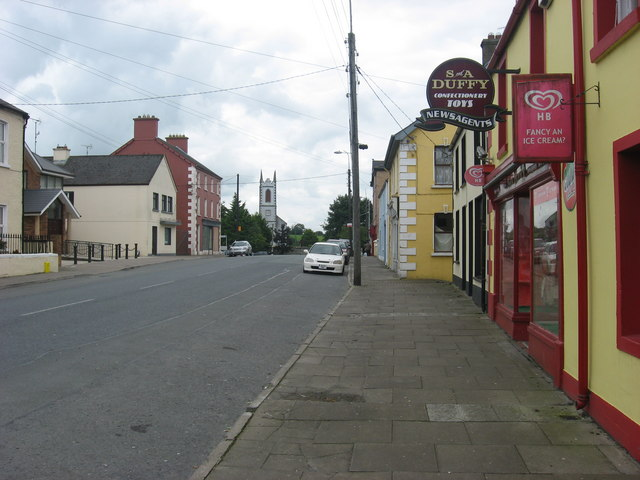
Main Street

== History ==
The town was founded in the early seventeenth century as a plantation village to accommodate mainly Presbyterian Scots who settled in this part of County Cavan. Usually, these planters gave their new settlements English or Scottish names—the neighbouring towns are Kingscourt, Cootehill, and Bailieborough—but Shercock retained its Irish name. The modern Irish-language name is Searcoig or Searcóg.

Nearly all of the surrounding townlands have kept their Gaelic names. For example, the townland of Lecks, on the Kingscourt road on the outskirts of Shercock, has been so named for a thousand years because of the flat-slabbed rocky landscape (leac is the Irish word for a flagstone).

By the mid-nineteenth century, the village and immediate area had a population of about 5,000. However, the great famines and subsequent emigration affected the county of Cavan, reducing the population by 50% between 1841 and 1891.

There were less than 300 people residing in Shercock by 1910. The town previously had a post office, which had telegraph and money-order departments. Wednesday was the market day around this time.

== Industry ==
The region is known as "Drumlin Country" owing to its topography of small hills and lakes formed at the end of the last ice age. County Cavan borders County Fermanagh and County Monaghan. Together, they form the colloquially named "Drumlin County". Shercock lies on the border between County Cavan and County Monaghan.

The Shercock area's main industry for nearly 300 years was the growing of flax for linen-making. One townland just outside Shercock is named Miltown, after the flax mill which lies ruined at its center. The industry gradually died away with the decline of the linen industry in northern Ireland.

Nowadays the town has some light industry and a small number of tourists based mainly on water sports and angling. Lough Sillan, on the edge of the town, is a noted coarse fishing lake. Annaghieran lake is situated one mile from town, and populated with Roach and Bream.

One of the enterprises which brings employment to the town is Manor Farms and Carton Brothers Chicken factory, which employs over 800 people and sources chicken from some 160 local chicken farms.

== Transport ==
Sillan Tours Limited provides daily bus connections from Shercock to Kingscourt, Navan and Dublin. Local Link launched route 171, from Shercock to Dundalk via Carrickmacross and Inniskeen, in July 2023 with several journeys each way daily. An electric bus is used on the route. Bus Éireann route 166 links Shercock to Cavan, Carrickmacross and Dundalk on Mondays, Wednesdays, and Fridays only.

== Arts ==
The Shercock Drama Festival takes place annually in March, with amateur dramatics groups from around the country participating in the event. St Patrick's Hall in Shercock serves as the venue. The 36th edition of the Shercock Drama Festival took place in March 2024.

== Sport ==
Shercock GFC, the local GAA club, play in the Cavan Senior Football Championship. In 2017, the club won the Tommy Gilroy Cup and, in the same year, received funding for the improvement of their dressing room and gym facilities.

Shercock Athletics Club provides coaching in middle distance running, cross country and track and field disciplines (sprints, jumps and throws). The Shercock AC track and the Craig Lynch High Performance Centre, both located in Shercock, have indoor and outdoor facilities.

== People ==
- Brendan McCahey - Voice of Ireland singer
- Oisin McEntee - soccer player
- The great-grandfather of U.S. Rep. John Murtha, also named John Murtha, was born in Shercock c. 1858. He moved to the United States in 1882.
- The family of playwright Richard Brinsley Sheridan (author of The School for Scandal) had an estate in Shercock.
- Patrick Kavanagh's 1948 novel Tarry Flynn is nominally set in the countryside around Shercock; although based on characters from his native Inniskeen.

== See also ==
- List of towns and villages in Ireland
- Market Houses in Ireland
- Ralaghan Man
