= Stephen Attride =

Irish Gaelic footballer

Stephen Attride (born 1993) is a Gaelic footballer who has played for the Killeshin club and the Laois county team, serving as captain of his county for the 2017, 2018 and 2019 seasons.

Attride was primarily interested in athletics from a young age, specifically middle-/long-distance running, at which he competed both nationally and internationally. However, while in his last year at school, he developed shin splints and this affected his future progress in athletics. He attended Dublin City University (DCU), where he played for the university football team. Initially playing at wing-forward, Attride developed into a corner-back.

Laois manager Justin McNulty noticed his progress and invited him onto the county panel in 2013. He scored a goal against Dublin in Laois's 2016 Leinster Senior Football Championship quarter-final loss to the then All-Ireland Senior Football Championship title holders. In 2017, the then Laois manager Peter Creedon appointed Attride as captain of the team. Creedon's successor John Sugrue allowed Attride to retain the county captaincy. Sugrue led Laois to the National Football League Division 4 title in his first year. It meant that Attride became the first Laois captain since Ian Fitzgerald to raise a trophy aloft in the Hogan Stand of Croke Park. Laois then advanced to a first Leinster Senior Football Championship final since 2007.

However, Attride was unavailable. While blocking a ball during stoppage time of his county's 2018 Leinster Senior Football Championship semi-final victory over Carlow at Croke Park, Attride collided with the knee of an opponent, was knocked unconscious, stretchered from the field of play and spent a night in the Mater Hospital after sustaining a double fracture to his skull. The injury also ruled him out for the remainder of the season. Attride's teammate Ross Munnelly and former Laois player Colm Parkinson both praised Attride's intervention. He later recovered.

Attride took a break from teaching (he teaches physical education and science) at Knockbeg College to travel to Australia ahead of the 2020 season. He was accompanied by his girlfriend and others he knew. He took up a teaching position at Bondi High School and trained with the Clann na Gael club.
