= 2022 Kerry county football team season =

Kerry county football team
2022 season
- Manager: Jack O'Connor
- Stadium: Fitzgerald Stadium, Killarney
- NFL D1: 1st (winners)
- All-Ireland SFC: Winners
- Munster SFC: Winners

The following is a summary of Kerry county football team's 2022 season. It was a first season back in charge for newly reappointed Kerry manager Jack O'Connor.

== Competitions ==
=== National Football League Division 1 ===
==== Table ====
Pos	Team	Pld	W	D	L	PF	PA	PD	Pts	Qualification
1	Kerry	7	5	1	1	118	91	+27	11	Advance to National League Final
2	Mayo	7	4	1	2	108	94	+14	9	Advance to National League Final
3	Armagh	7	3	1	3	108	98	+10	7	
4	Donegal	7	3	1	3	95	103	−8	7	
5	Tyrone	7	3	1	3	85	96	−11	7	
6	Monaghan	7	2	2	3	100	113	−13	6	
7	Kildare	7	2	1	4	104	111	−7	5	Relegation to 2023 NFL Division 2
8	Dublin	7	2	0	5	106	118	−12	4	Relegation to 2023 NFL Division 2

Updated to match(es) played on 27 March 2022. Source: GAA.ie
Rules for classification: Tiebreakers

==== Reports ====
30 January 2022 Round 1	Kildare	0-13 (13) – (13) 1-10	Kerry	Newbridge
13:45 GMT (UTC+0)				Venue: St Conleth's Park
		Report		Referee: David Coldrick (Meath)

5 February 2022 Round 2	Kerry	1-15 (18) – (11) 0-11	Dublin	Tralee
19:00 GMT (UTC+0)				Venue: Austin Stack Park
		Report		Referee: Conor Lane (Cork); Attendance: 12,000

20 February 2022 Round 3	Kerry	1-13 (16) – (7) 0-07	Donegal	Killarney
13:45 GMT (UTC+0)				Venue: Fitzgerald Stadium
		Report		Referee: Maurice Deegan (Laois)

27 February 2022 Round 4	Monaghan	1-12 (15) – (23) 3-14	Kerry	Inniskeen
14:00 GMT (UTC+0)				Venue: Inniskeen Park
				Referee: Paddy Neilan (Roscommon)

12 March 2022 Round 5	Kerry	1-12 (15) – (14) 0-14	Mayo	Tralee
19:30 GMT (UTC+0)				Venue: Austin Stack Park
		Report		Referee: Brendan Cawley (Kildare)

20 March 2022 Round 6	Armagh	0-13 (13) – (16) 1-13	Kerry	Armagh
14:00 GMT (UTC+0)				Venue: Athletic Grounds

27 March 2022 Round 7	Kerry	2-11 (17) – (18) 1-15	Tyrone	Killarney
13:45 IST (UTC+1)				Venue: Fitzgerald Stadium

TG4

3 April 2022
Final

Report

Kerry	3-19 (28) – 0-13 (13)	Mayo
(HT: 1-10 (13) - 0-7 (7))

Croke Park, Drumcondra, Dublin
Referee: N Mooney (Cavan)
Attendance: 31,506

=== Munster Senior Football Championship ===
==== Fixtures ====
7 May 2022	Cork	0-11 - 0-23	Kerry	Pairc Ui Rinn; Attendance: 10,743; Referee: Brendan Cawley (Kildare)
7 May 2022		Report		Pairc Ui Rinn; Attendance: 10,743; Referee: Brendan Cawley (Kildare)

28 May 2022 2022

Kerry	1-28 - 0-08	Limerick
	Report

Fitzgerald Stadium
Attendance: 14,587
Referee: Martin McNally (Monaghan)

==== Bracket ====
Quarter-finals
Waterford	0-9
Limerick	2-14
Tipperary	2-11
Clare	1-11

Semi-finals
Limerick	2-11
Tipperary	1-15
Cork	1-12
Kerry	0-13

Final
Tipperary	0-17
Cork	0-14

=== All-Ireland Senior Football Championship ===
26 June 2022; 17:00; Quarter-final	Kerry	1–18 (21) – (13) 0–13	Mayo	Croke Park, Dublin; Attendance: 71,353; Referee: David Gough (Meath)
26 June 2022; 17:00; Quarter-final	David Clifford 1–3 (2 marks, 1 free), Paul Geaney 0–4 (1 mark), Tom O’Sullivan 0–3, Sean O’Shea 0–3 (1f), David Moran 0–2, Graham O’Sullivan, Gavin White, Killian Spillane all 0–1.	Report	Cillian O’Connor 0–3 (2f), Jordan Flynn 0–2, Stephen Coen, Aidan O’Shea, Matthew Ruane, Conor Loftus, James Carr, Kevin McLoughlin, Jack Carney, Rob Hennelly (free) all 0–1	Croke Park, Dublin; Attendance: 71,353; Referee: David Gough (Meath)

10 July 2022; 15:30; Semi-final	Dublin	1–13 (16) – (17) 1–14	Kerry	Croke Park, Dublin; Attendance: 73,609; Referee: Paddy Neilan (Roscommon); Man of the Match: Paudie Clifford
10 July 2022; 15:30; Semi-final	Ciarán Kilkenny 0–3, Dean Rock 0–3 (0–3f), Cormac Costello 1–0, Lee Gannon 0–1, John Small 0–1, Seán Bugler 0–1, Brian Fenton 0–1, Paddy Small 0–1, Brian Howard 0–1, James McCarthy 0–1	Report	Seán O'Shea 1–4 (0–2f), David Clifford 0–6 (0–1f, 0–1 mark), Paudie Clifford 0–2, Dara Moynihan 0–1, Tom O’Sullivan 0–1	Croke Park, Dublin; Attendance: 73,609; Referee: Paddy Neilan (Roscommon); Man of the Match: Paudie Clifford

RTÉ
Sky Sports

24 July 2022
15:30 IST (UTC+1)
Final

Report

Galway	0–16 – 0–20	Kerry
(HT: 0–08 – 0–07)
Pts: Shane Walsh 9 (4f, 1 '45), Cillian McDaid 4, Jack Glynn 1, Kieran Molloy 1, Johnny Heaney 1		Pts: David Clifford 8 (3f, 2 mark), Seán O'Shea 3 (3f), Paudie Clifford 2, Killian Spillane 2, Graham O’Sullivan 1, Paul Geaney 1 (1 mark), Diarmuid O'Connor 1, Stephen O’Brien 1, Gavin White 1

Croke Park, Dublin
Referee: Sean Hurson (Tyrone)
Attendance: 82,300
Standby: Paddy Neilan (Roscommon)
Linesman: Barry Cassidy (Derry)
Sideline: Sean Laverty (Antrim)
Umpires: Mark Coney (Ardboe O'Donovan Rossa), Mel Taggart (Clonoe O'Rahilly's), Cathal Forbes (Ardboe O'Donovan Rossa), Martin Conway (Moortown St Malachy's)

== Management team ==
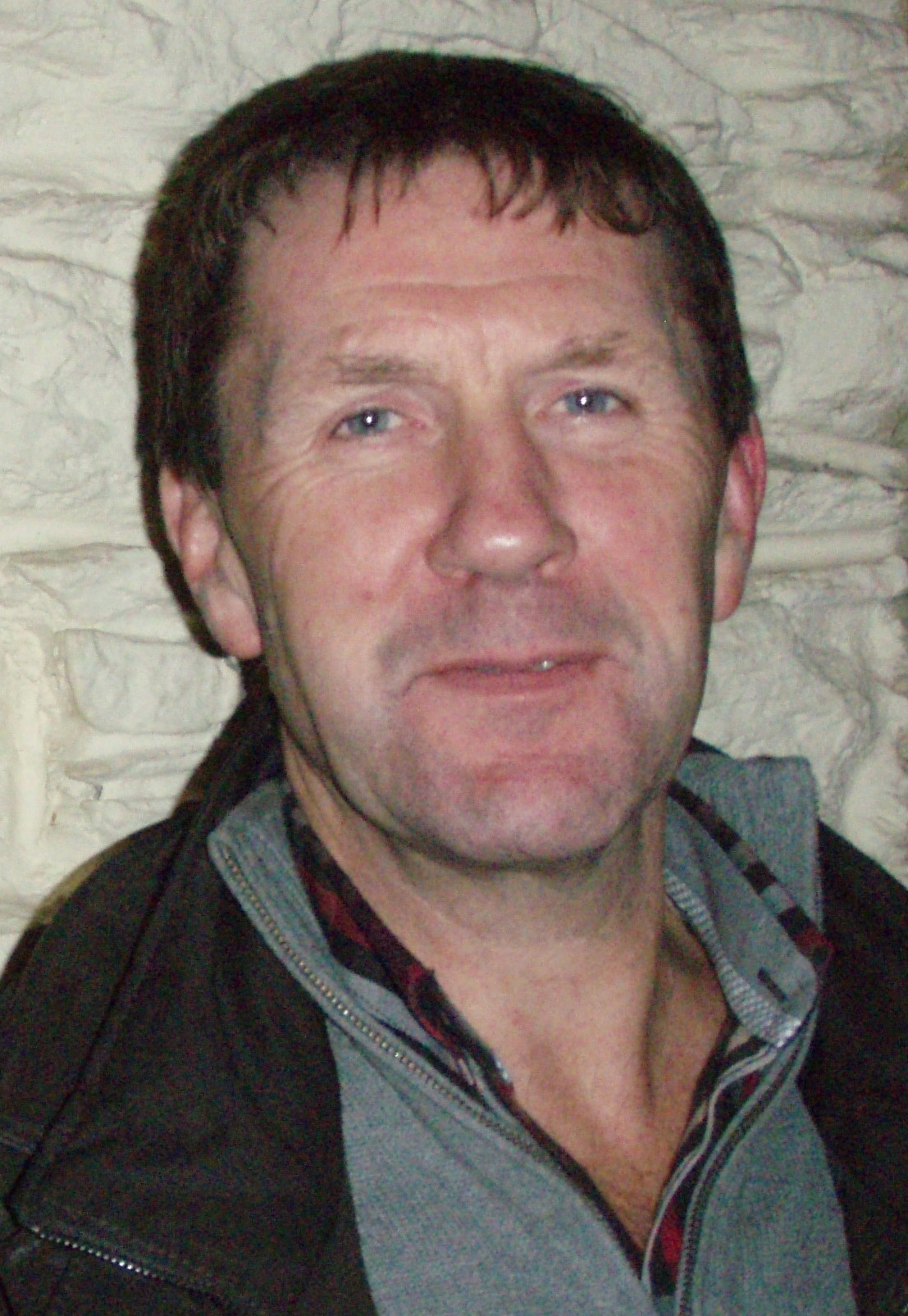
Jack O'Connor managed Kerry to the 2022 National Football League title, the 2022 Munster Senior Football Championship and the 2022 All-Ireland Senior Football Championship.

Appointed 4 October 2021:

- Bainisteóir: Jack O'Connor (Piarsaigh Na Dromada)
- Roghnóirí: Micheál Quirke (Kerins O'Rahilly's), Diarmuid Murphy (Dingle)
- Later additions:
  - Head coach: Paddy Tally, as of 8 October 2021
  - Performance coach: Tony Griffin
  - Head of athletic development: Jason McGahan
  - Strength and conditioning coach: Arthur Fitzgerald
  - Sports science: John Barry
  - Statistics: Colin Trainor
  - Video: John C. O'Shea
  - Team doctors: Dr Mike Finnerty and John Rice
  - Physiotherapists: Jimmy Galvin and Paudie McQuinn
  - Masseurs: Harry O'Neill and Liam O'Regan
  - Goalkeeping coach: Brendan Kealy
  - Nutritionists: Kevin Beasley and Gavin Rackard (Rackard is also performance nutritionist for Connacht Rugby)
  - Equipment: Colm Whelan
  - Equipment/in-house referee: Brendan Griffin
