= Drew Wylie =

Monaghan Gaelic footballer

Personal information
- Occupation: ESB

Sport
- Sport: Gaelic football
- Position: Full back
Club
- Years: Club
- ? – Present: Ballybay Pearse Brothers
Club titles
- Monaghan titles: 2
Inter-county
- Years: County
- 2012 – 2022: Monaghan county team
Inter-county titles
- Ulster titles: 2

Drew Wylie is a Gaelic footballer who plays for Ballybay Pearse Brothers and at senior level for the Monaghan county team. He has earned three All-Star nominations, in 2013, 2014 and 2018.

== Career ==
=== Club ===
Wylie has won two County titles with Ballybay, in 2012 and 2022.

=== County ===
Wylie was part of the teams that won the 2013 and 2015 Ulster Senior Football Championship. He was also part of the team that reached the All Ireland semi final in 2018, a first appearance at this stage of the competition since 1988.

Unusually for a Gaelic footballer, Wylie is a Protestant. During a 2015 Dr McKenna Cup match, Wylie was verbally abused using sectarian language by Cavan midfielder Gearoid McKiernan. McKiernan was sent off and handed a two-match ban. The incident was believed to be the first time that a red card had been deployed as a punishment for either racist or sectarian abuse.

== Personal life ==
His brother Ryan is also a Gaelic footballer with Ballybay and Monaghan.

His family having no history in the GAA, he was introduced by neighbour Kieran Finlay, former Monaghan player and father of Paul Finlay.

Wylie attended Ballybay Central School and Castleblayney College, where no one played Gaelic.
