= Ian Fitzgerald =

Irish Gaelic footballer

Ian Fitzgerald is a former Gaelic footballer from County Laois.

He played his club football for Portlaoise and was also a member of the Laois senior team.

He was part of the Laois Under 21 side that won the Leinster title in 1998 and was unfortunate to lose out on a Leinster Minor Football Championship medal in 1995 when it took three games to separate the O'Moore County and eventual All-Ireland Minor Football Championship winners Westmeath. Also in 1995 he earned a reputation as a penalty kick specialist during Laois's Leinster MFC run, famously netting a game-saving spot kick against Kildare in Navan.

Fitzgerald made his senior debut against Kildare in 1996 and in 2003 was captain of the Laois team that won the Leinster Senior Football Championship title for the first time in 57 years.

Fitzgerald won Laois Senior Football Championship medals with Portlaoise in 1999, 2002, 2004 and 2011.

Fitzgerald retired from the game in 2006 at the young age of 29 in order to concentrate on his career as a dentist.

He attended Marquette University School of Dentistry in Milwaukee, Wi and was a resident in the dental school's orthodontic program before returning to Ireland in 2010.

He briefly returned to club football with Portlaoise in 2011 winning a fourth Laois SFC medal that year.

Stephen Attride became the first Laois captain since Fitzgerald to raise a trophy aloft in the Hogan Stand of Croke Park when John Sugrue led Laois to the 2018 National Football League Division 4 title.
