= Paul McLoughlin (Gaelic footballer) =

Football player

Paul McLoughlin is a Gaelic football manager and former player.

== Playing career ==
McLoughlin played at senior level for the Kildare county team, appearing in three Leinster Senior Football Championship finals during his career. He then took up residency in Rosslare. He is originally from Clane.

== Managerial career ==
He managed Wexford's minor team, and also held senior roles during the managements of Jason Ryan and Aidan O'Brien, after which he was appointed as Wexford senior manager, succeeding Séamus McEnaney (known as "Banty"). He was appointed for a three-year term. Under McLoughlin's guidance, the team's 2018 National Football League campaign ended in relegation. Laois defeated Wexford in the first round of 2018 Leinster Senior Football Championship, a result which was followed by an unexpected loss to Waterford in a 2018 All-Ireland Senior Football Championship qualifier. Louth eliminated Wexford in the 2019 Leinster Senior Football Championship. After Derry defeated Wexford in a 2019 All-Ireland Senior Football Championship qualifier, McLoughlin tendered his resignation.

During his time as Wexford manager, he brought his players to Munich as a bonding exercise, with the money for the trip collected by themselves. McLoughlin was critical of the support he was given for preparing his team, as many members of his panel returned to play for their clubs.

| Preceded by Séamus McEnaney | Wexford Senior Football Manager; 2017–2019 | Succeeded by Paul Galvin |
