= Paddy Linden =

Monaghan Gaelic football goalkeeper

Sport
- Sport: Gaelic football
- Position: Goalkeeper
Club
- Years: Club
- Ballybay Pearse Brothers
Club titles
- Monaghan titles: 1
Inter-county
- Years: County
- Monaghan county team
Inter-county titles
- Ulster titles: 3
- NFL: 1

Paddy Linden (born 1954/1955) is a former Gaelic footballer with Ballybay Pearse Brothers and Monaghan. He was a goalkeeper for the teams and often a corner-back for Ballybay. For nearly two decades he was an inter-county player. He is a nephew of the late Cavan player Jack Smallhorny.

== Career ==
=== Early career ===
He served his apprenticeship with Paul McCarthy, the Ballybay, Monaghan and Railway Cup Ulster player. When McCarthy moved into the forward line for Ballybay's replayed 1975 county champions final against Castleblayney Faughs, the position of goalkeeper became available and Linden took the opportunity. Ballybay won a county Division One League title in 1978, with Linden in nets, but he had to wait eight years for another. He won a county league medal in 1986 and a Senior County Championship medal in 1987. Joe McMahon, known for his part in the Ballybay-Drumhowan Murray Cup amalgamation side, originally asked Linden in to try the netminder position when Linden was a young man. He played with players such as Kieran Finlay and Gerry Duffy, and the Tullycorbet parish combination got a Murry Cup title.

=== County appearances, car accident ===
Linden did not get in on the county minor set-up. He was in on the under-21 set-up, but Clones goalkeeper Gerry McGarry had the spot on the team. His first appearance for Monaghan was at senior level. He got selected for the county team in 1978, succeeding McGarry when Seán McCague was appointed as the manager. He conceded four goals at Casement Park in his debut against Antrim, but continued in the netminding role. Monaghan surprised when they won the 1979 Ulster Senior Football Championship, with Linden. He got a Railway Cup medal next year while playing for Ulster. He was involved in a car accident in 1981, but kept on playing despite serious injuries. He took eighteen months to recover, but it took a heavy physical and psychological toll on his athleticism and he lost two and a half stone.

=== Recovery and national success ===
He got back inside the county frame in late 1982. He had a place on the 1985 Ulster Championship winning team, which took Kerry to an All Ireland Semi Final replay in 1985. He took another Ulster medal in 1988. Linden holds his 1984–85 National Football League medal as his most prized possession. In 1988 Linden became a household name around the country when at age 33 he won Ulster, County and Railway Cup medals and got an All Star Award. He won attention by saving a penalty hit by Larry Tompkins in the 12th minute of the 1988 All Ireland Senior Semi Final.

=== Retirement ===
After the 1991 Championship he retired over criticism after the Derry game in Celtic Park. He came back as a stand-in for the 1992 Dr McKenna Cup. Team manager Liam Stirrat pushed him out in the autumn of 1991. Linden was memorable for his dare-devil antics on the pitch, flying off the line, and was 37 in 1992, older than anyone else on the team. He assists younger players at his club.

== Awards ==
Linden was the first Ulster player ever to get an All Star. He was Ballybay's first (and so far only) All Star and was inducted into the Monaghan GAA Hall of Fame.
