= Billy Sheehan (Gaelic footballer) =

Irish Gaelic football manager (born 1981)

Personal information
- Native name: Liam Ó Síocháin (Irish)
- Nickname: Bomber
- Born: 18 December 1981 (age 44) Tralee, Ireland
- Height: 6 ft 2 in (188 cm)

Sport
- Sport: Gaelic football
- Position: Left half forward
Clubs
- Years: Club
- 1997–2003 2004–2014 2015–2020 2020–: Austin Stacks; Emo; St Judes; Cratloe
Club titles
- Kerry / Laois titles: 2 (Dublin UCD & Cork UCC)
- Leinster titles: 1 (Munster)
Inter-county
- Years: County
- 1990s–2000s 2004–2015: Kerry; Laois

Billy Sheehan (born 18 December 1981) is a Gaelic football manager and former player. He lined out with two county teams: Kerry and Laois. He was manager of the Laois county team from 2021 until 2023.

== Schools ==
During his secondary school days in Tralee CBS he won a Frewen Cup title.

== Club ==
He began his career with the Austin Stacks club in Tralee. He lined out in the 2001 Kerry Senior Football Championship loss to An Ghaeltacht. He would go on to win a Kerry Club Football Championship in 2003 with the Tralee side.

While a UCD student, Billy transferred to the Emo club in Laois in 2004. He helped them to a Laois All-County Football League Division 1 title in 2005 before adding a Laois Intermediate Football Championship in 2012.

In 2015 he joined Dublin side St Jude's. He was part of the St Jude's team that reached the 2018 Dublin Senior Football Championship final but lost out to Kilmacud Crokes.

In 2020 he was again on the move this time linking up with Clare side Cratloe. He played again in the Clare county final in Cratloes loss to Kilmurry.

This was his 7th county final in 5 different counties with 6 different teams.

He also had success at club level while in college. First with UCC. He won a Cork Senior Football Championship title with the Students as they overcame Nemo Rangers in the final after a re-play. He later added a Munster Senior Club Football Championship as the college beat holders and Clare champions Doonbeg in the final. They would later lose out to Crossmaglen Rangers in the All-Ireland Senior Club Football Championship semi-final.

He continued his studies in Dublin and lined out with UCD. He won a Dublin Senior Football Championship with the college when they got the better of St Vincents in the final.

== Inter-county ==
He first played with the Kerry under-21 team in 1999 he in appeared as a sub during the All-Ireland semi-final win over Roscommon. He played no part in the final.

He was underage again in 2000. He scored a hat-trick against Tipperary in the Munster quarter-final before a surprise loss to Waterford in the semi-final.

Billy went on to play two seasons of National League in years 2001 and 2003 under manager Páidí Ó Sé.

In late 2004 he transferred his allegiance to Laois who were being managed by Mick O'Dwyer.

In his opening season(2005) he lined out at wing forward in the Leinster final in a narrow one point defeat to Dublin. They beat Derry before Armagh beat them in an All-Ireland quarter final.

He also won a Railway Cup medal in 2005 defeating Connaught and Ulster in the final under Paul "Pillar" Caffery.

In 2006 Laois beat All-Ireland champions Tyrone in the qualifier series before being beaten by Mayo in a replay in the All-Ireland quarter final.

Liam Kearns took over in 2007 and again Laois lost out in the Leinster final in Dublin with Billy again playing a role.

He played also under Seán Dempsey in years 2009/2010.

Billy would again line out for Leinster in a defeat to Ulster in Crossmaglen.

Justin McNulty brought Laois to a division 2 final(loss to Donegal) but promotion to division 1 again. Billy lined out at full forward throughout this season.

In 2012 Laois had a great run in the qualifiers, defeating Carlow, Monaghan, Leitrim, Meath before coming unstuck by a goal against the current champions Dublin in the All-Ireland quarter final.

In 2013 Laois again lost out to the previous years champions Donegal in Carrick-on-Shannon in the last 12 of the competition.

In 2014 and 2015 he played under Tomás Ó Flatharta and his last game would be a qualifier loss to Antrim.

He has played over 40 championship games for Laois and has made well over 100 appearances in both league and championship for both counties.

He was ratified as Laois senior manager in October 2021 and resigned from the position in July 2023.

== Honours ==
Emo

- 1 Laois All-County Football League 2005
- 1 Laois Intermediate Football Championship 2012

UCC

- 1 Cork Senior Football Championship 1999
- 1 Munster Senior Club Football Championship 1999

UCD

- 1 Dublin Senior Football Championship 2006

Leinster

- 1 Railway Cup 2005

Sporting positions
Preceded by Mike Quirke	Laois Senior Football Manager; 2021–2023	Succeeded by Justin McNulty
