= 1985–86 National Football League (Ireland) =

Gaelic football competition

League details
- Dates: October 1985 – 4 May 1986

League champions
- Winners: Laois (2nd win)
- Captain: Colm Browne
- Manager: Kieran Brennan

League runners-up
- Runners-up: Monaghan
- Captain: Eugene Sherry

Match programme from the semi-finals, 20 April 1986.

The 1985–86 National Football League, known for sponsorship reasons as the Ford National Football League, was the 55th staging of the National Football League (NFL), an annual Gaelic football tournament for the Gaelic Athletic Association county teams of Ireland.

Laois won their second title to bridge a sixty-year gap.

== Format ==
1985-86 saw a change in format of the National League. Divisions Three and Four were amalgamated into a new Division Three, which was split by region.

=== Divisions ===
- Division One: 8 teams
- Division Two: 8 teams
- Division Three: 16 teams. Split into two regional groups of 8 (North and South)

=== Round-robin format ===
Each team played every other team in its division (or group where the division is split) once, either home or away.

=== Points awarded ===
2 points were awarded for a win and 1 for a draw.

=== Titles ===
Teams in all three divisions competed for the National Football League title.

=== Knockout stage qualifiers ===
- Division One: top 4 teams
- Division Two: top 2 teams
- Division Three (North): group winners
- Division Three (South): group winners

=== Knockout phase structure ===
In the quarter-finals, the match-ups were as follows:

- Quarter-final 1: First-placed team in Division One v First-placed team in Division Three (South)
- Quarter-final 2: Second-placed team in Division One v First-placed team in Division Three (North)
- Quarter-final 3: Third-placed team in Division One v Second-placed team in Division Two
- Quarter-final 4: Fourth-placed team in Division One v First-placed team in Division Two

The semi-final match-ups are:

- Semi-final 1: Winner Quarter-final 1 v Winner Quarter-final 4
- Semi-final 2: Winner Quarter-final 2 v Winner Quarter-final 3

The final match-up is: Winner Semi-final 1 v Winner Semi-final 2.

=== Promotion and relegation ===
- Division One: bottom 2 teams demoted to Division Two
- Division Two: top 2 teams promoted to Division One. Bottom 2 teams demoted to Division Three.
- Division Three (North): group winners promoted to Division Two.
- Division Three (South): group winners promoted to Division Two.

=== Separation of teams on equal points ===
In the event that teams finish on equal points, then a play-off will be used to determine group placings if necessary, i.e. where to decide relegation places or quarter-finalists.

== League Tables ==
=== Division One ===
Team	Pld	W	D	L	Pts	Status
Down	7	6	1	0	13	Advance to quarter-finals
Monaghan	7	5	1	1	11	Advance to quarter-finals
Meath	7	4	1	2	9	Advance to quarter-finals
Armagh	7	2	3	2	7	Advance to quarter-finals
Kerry	7	3	0	4	6
Roscommon	7	2	1	4	5
Kildare	7	1	1	5	3	Relegated to Division Two of the 1986–87 NFL
Tyrone	7	1	0	6	2	Relegated to Division Two of the 1986–87 NFL

=== Division Two ===
Team	Pld	W	D	L	Pts	Status
Mayo	7	5	1	1	11	Advance to quarter-finals; promoted to Division One of the 1986–87 NFL
Dublin	7	5	0	2	10	Advance to quarter-finals; promoted to Division One of the 1986–87 NFL
Donegal	7	4	1	2	9
Cork	7	4	1	2	9
Cavan	7	3	1	3	7
Longford	7	3	0	4	6
Galway	7	2	0	3	4	Relegated to Division Three of the 1986–87 NFL
Wexford	7	0	0	7	0	Relegated to Division Three of the 1986–87 NFL

=== Division Three ===
==== Division Three (North) table ====
Team	Pld	W	D	L	Pts	Status
Derry	7	6	0	1	12	Advance to quarter-finals; promoted to Division Two of the 1986–87 NFL
Louth	7	5	0	2	10
Offaly	7	5	0	2	10
Antrim	7	4	1	2	9
Sligo	7	4	0	3	8
Leitrim	7	1	1	5	3
Fermanagh	7	2	0	5	4
Westmeath	7	0	0	7	0

==== Division Three (South) table ====
Team	Pld	W	D	L	Pts	Status
Laois	7	6	1	0	13	Advance to quarter-finals; promoted to Division Two of the 1986–87 NFL
Carlow	7	3	4	0	10
Wicklow	7	3	2	2	8
Limerick	7	4	0	3	8
Clare	7	3	1	3	7
Tipperary	7	3	1	3	7
Waterford	7	1	0	6	2
Kilkenny	7	0	1	6	1

== Knockout stages ==
=== Quarter-finals ===
30 March 1986
Quarter-Final

Mayo	0-15 – 1-7	Armagh

Croke Park, Dublin
Referee: Seamus Aldridge (Kildare)

30 March 1986
Quarter-Final

Dublin	2-8 – 1-10	Meath

Croke Park, Dublin
Referee: J Gough (Antrim)

6 April 1986
Quarter-Final

Laois	1-15 – 0-15	Down

Croke Park, Dublin
Attendance: 10,267
Referee: Paddy Lane (Limerick)

6 April 1986
Quarter-Final

Monaghan	2-9 – 1-6	Derry

Croke Park, Dublin
Attendance: 10,267
Referee: S Prior (Leitrim)

=== Semi-finals ===
20 April 1986
Semi-Final

Laois	0-12 – 1-7	Dublin

Croke Park, Dublin

20 April 1986
Semi-Final

Monaghan	0-10 – 1-6	Mayo

Croke Park, Dublin

=== Final ===
4 May 1986
Final

Laois	2-6 – 2-5	Monaghan
Liam Irwin 0-6, Willie Brennan 1-0, Eamonn Whelan 1-0

Croke Park, Dublin
Attendance: 29,406
Referee: Pat Lane (Limerick)
