= David Brennan =

Irish Gaelic footballer

Personal information
- Native name: Daibhéid Ó Braonáin (Irish)
- Born: Dublin, Ireland

Sport
- Sport: Gaelic football
- Position: Half back
Club
- Years: Club
- ? -?: St Mary's
Inter-county
- Years: County
- ?- ?: Laois

David Brennan is a Dublin-born Gaelic footballer who plays for Laois under the parentage rule. His father Dessie was a famous player in the 1970s for both Laois and St Joseph's.

At club level, Brennan usually lines out at centre half back with St Mary's GAA (Dublin).

In 2007, his performances at club level earned him a call up to the Laois senior football squad from new manager, Liam Kearns.

He had previously been part of the Laois senior squad in 2001, 2002 and 2004, missing out in 2003 as Laois won the Leinster Senior Football Championship.
