= 1986–87 National Football League (Ireland) =

Gaelic football competition

League details
- Dates: October 1986 – 26 April 1987

League champions
- Winners: Dublin (6th win)
- Captain: Barney Rock
- Manager: Gerry McCaul

League runners-up
- Runners-up: Kerry
- Captain: Mikey Sheehy
- Manager: Mick O'Dwyer

The 1986–87 National Football League, known for sponsorship reasons as the Ford National Football League, was the 56th staging of the National Football League (NFL), an annual Gaelic football tournament for the Gaelic Athletic Association county teams of Ireland.

The quarter-final rounds were notable for the Dublin–Cork tie. After the game ended in a draw, Cork refused to play extra time and Dublin took the field unopposed, Barney Rock scoring a goal into an empty net before the referee awarded them victory (later chosen as one of the Top 20 GAA Moments). The Dubs went on to defeat Kerry in the final.

== Format ==
=== Divisions ===
- Division One: 8 teams
- Division Two: 8 teams
- Division Three: 16 teams. Split into two regional groups of 8 (North and South)

=== Round-robin format ===
Each team played every other team in its division (or group where the division is split) once, either home or away.

=== Points awarded ===
2 points were awarded for a win and 1 for a draw.

=== Titles ===
Teams in all three divisions competed for the National Football League title.

=== Knockout stage qualifiers ===
- Division One: top 4 teams
- Division Two: top 2 teams
- Division Three (North): group winners
- Division Three (South): group winners

=== Knockout phase structure ===
In the quarter-finals, the match-ups were as follows:

- Quarter-final 1: First-placed team in Division One v First-placed team in Division Three (South)
- Quarter-final 2: Second-placed team in Division One v First-placed team in Division Three (North)
- Quarter-final 3: Third-placed team in Division One v Second-placed team in Division Two
- Quarter-final 4: Fourth-placed team in Division One v First-placed team in Division Two

The semi-final match-ups are:

- Semi-final 1: Winner Quarter-final 1 v Winner Quarter-final 4
- Semi-final 2: Winner Quarter-final 2 v Winner Quarter-final 3

The final match-up is: Winner Semi-final 1 v Winner Semi-final 2.

=== Promotion and relegation ===
- Division One: bottom 2 teams demoted to Division Two
- Division Two: top 2 teams promoted to Division One. Bottom 2 teams demoted to Division Three.
- Division Three (North): group winners promoted to Division Two.
- Division Three (South): group winners promoted to Division Two.

=== Separation of teams on equal points ===
In the event that teams finish on equal points, then a play-off will be used to determine group placings if necessary, i.e. where to decide relegation places or quarter-finalists.

== League Phase Tables and Results ==
=== Division One ===
==== Play-Off ====
5 April 1987 For 6th Place	Armagh	2-8 — 0-11	Roscommon	Breffni Park, Cavan

==== Table ====
Team	Pld	W	D	L	Pts	Status
Kerry	7	5	0	2	10	Advance to knockout stage
Meath	7	4	1	2	9	Advance to knockout stage
Monaghan	7	4	1	2	9	Advance to knockout stage
Dublin	7	4	0	3	8	Advance to knockout stage
Mayo	7	3	0	4	6
Armagh	7	2	1	4	5
Roscommon	7	2	1	4	5	Relegated to Division Two of the 1987–88 NFL
Down	7	2	0	5	4	Relegated to Division Two of the 1987–88 NFL

=== Division Two ===
Team	Pld	W	D	L	Pts	Status
Cork	7	6	0	1	12	Promoted to Division One of the 1987–88 NFL and advance to knockout stage
Derry	7	5	0	2	10	Promoted to Division One of the 1987–88 NFL and advance to knockout stage
Donegal	7	3	2	2	8
Kildare	7	4	0	3	8
Laois	7	3	0	4	6
Cavan	7	2	1	4	5
Longford	7	2	0	5	4	Relegated to Division Three of the 1987–88 NFL
Tyrone	7	1	1	5	3	Relegated to Division Three of the 1987–88 NFL

=== Division Three ===
==== Division Three (North) table ====
Team	Pld	W	D	L	Pts	Status
Galway	7	7	0	0	14	Promoted to Division Two of the 1987–88 NFL and advance to knockout stage
Antrim	7	4	1	2	9
Offaly	7	3	1	3	7
Louth	7	3	1	3	7
Westmeath	7	2	2	3	6
Sligo	7	2	1	4	5
Leitrim	7	2	1	4	5
Fermanagh	7	1	1	5	3

==== Division Three (South) table ====
Team	Pld	W	D	L	Pts	Status
Clare	7	6	0	1	12	Promoted to Division Two of the 1987–88 NFL and advance to knockout stage
Tipperary	7	4	1	2	9
Limerick	7	4	1	2	9
Waterford	7	3	1	3	7
Wicklow	7	3	1	3	7
Wexford	7	3	1	3	7
Carlow	7	2	1	4	5
Kilkenny	7	0	0	7	0

== Knockout stages ==
=== Quarter-finals ===
5 April 1987

Dublin	0-10 – 1-7	Cork
	Report

Croke Park, Dublin
Referee: Michael Greenan
- Cork refused to play extra time and so Dublin were awarded the game.

5 April 1987

Monaghan	1-7 – 0-5	Derry

Omagh

5 April 1987

Kerry	1-10 – 0-10	Clare

Ennis

12 April 1987

Galway	1-8 – 0-9	Meath

Portlaoise

=== Semi-finals ===
12 April 1987

Kerry	2-11 – 2-9	Monaghan

Croke Park, Dublin
Referee:

19 April 1987

Dublin	1-8 – 0-8	Galway

Portlaoise
Attendance: 15,800
Referee: J.J. Landers (Waterford)

=== Final ===
26 April 1987
Final

Dublin	1-11 – 0-11	Kerry

Croke Park, Dublin
