= Conor Gorman =

Irish Gaelic footballer

Personal information
- Native name: Conor Ó Gormáin (Irish)
- Born: Ireland

Sport
- Sport: Gaelic football
- Position: Goalkeeper
Club
- Years: Club
- ? -?: Clonaslee–St Manman's
Inter-county
- Years: County
- ?- ?: Laois

Conor Gorman is a Gaelic footballer from County Laois.

He usually plays as goalkeeper for the Laois county team and in 2003 was part of the Laois team that won the All-Ireland Minor Football Championship title for the first time since 1997.

In 2006, Gorman was part of the Laois team that won the Leinster U21 Football Championship.

Although he has played all his inter-county football as a goalkeeper, Gorman plays most of his club football for Clonaslee–St Manman's in attack.
