= Bernie Murray (Gaelic footballer) =

Irish Gaelic footballer

Bernie Murray (born 1964/1965) is an Irish Gaelic football coach and former player. He played for Scotstown and the Monaghan county team.

Murray featured for his county in both the minor and under-21 grades. His senior inter-county career lasted from 1983 until 1993. He won a National League medal in 1985, breaking his leg shortly afterwards, which meant he could not play in that year's Ulster Senior Football Championship. During his playing career, Murray transferred to Louth GAA club Stabannon Parnells, as did Monaghan teammate Gerry Hoey.

Murray also won six Monaghan Senior Football Championship titles and Ulster Senior Club Football Championship titles. Since retiring from playing he has coached various clubs in several counties (including Stabannon, Dromintee, Navan O'Mahony's and Ballymacnab), as well as the Monaghan minor team. He worked with Aidan O'Rourke when O'Rourke was managing the Louth county team, as well as when O'Rourke was managing Queen's University in the Sigerson Cup. He also served as a selector from the beginning of Séamus McEnaney's first spell as Monaghan senior manager in 2004. However, McEnaney parted ways with him ahead of the 2007 season.
