= Paul Finley =

Paul Finley may refer to:

- Paul Findley (1921–2019), American politician
- Paul Finlay, Irish Gaelic footballer
