= Brendan Murray (Gaelic footballer) =

Irish Gaelic footballer

Brendan Murray is an Irish Gaelic football manager and former player for the Monaghan county team in the 1980s.

Murray played minor football for his county, and was on the team that reached an Ulster Minor Football Championship final in 1983. As a senior player he won the 1984–85 National Football League. He broke his jaw during the 1988 All-Ireland Senior Football Championship semi-final against Cork at Croke Park. After retiring from playing, he became a manager – including of Navan O'Mahonys.
