= 1984–85 National Football League (Ireland) =

Gaelic football competition

League details
- Dates: October 1984 – 7 April 1985

League champions
- Winners: Monaghan (1st win)
- Captain: Eugene Sherry

League runners-up
- Runners-up: Armagh

The 1984–85 National Football League was the 54th staging of the National Football League (NFL), an annual Gaelic football tournament for the Gaelic Athletic Association county teams of Ireland.

Monaghan won their first and only national title with a win over Armagh in the final.

== Format ==
This was the final year of the NFL in its present format before a move to a three division league for the 1985–86 NFL.

=== Divisions ===
- Division One: 8 teams
- Division Two: 8 teams
- Division Three: 8 teams.
- Division Four: 8 teams.

=== Round-robin format ===
Each team played every other team in its division (or group where the division is split) once, either home or away.

=== Points awarded ===
2 points were awarded for a win and 1 for a draw.

=== Titles ===
Teams in all four divisions competed for the National Football League title.

=== Knockout stage qualifiers ===
- Division One: top 4 teams
- Division Two: top 2 teams
- Division Three: top team
- Division Four: top team

=== Knockout phase structure ===
In the quarter-finals, the match-ups were as follows:

- Quarter-final 1: First-placed team in Division One v First-placed team in Division Four
- Quarter-final 2: Second-placed team in Division One v First-placed team in Division Three
- Quarter-final 3: Third-placed team in Division One v Second-placed team in Division Two
- Quarter-final 4: Fourth-placed team in Division One v First-placed team in Division Two

The semi-final match-ups are:

- Semi-final 1: Winner Quarter-final 1 v Winner Quarter-final 4
- Semi-final 2: Winner Quarter-final 2 v Winner Quarter-final 3

The final match-up is: Winner Semi-final 1 v Winner Semi-final 2.

=== Promotion and relegation ===
When the NFL was played, relegation was to be as follows:

- Division One: bottom 2 teams demoted to Division Two
- Division Two: top 2 teams promoted to Division One. Bottom 2 teams demoted to Division Three.
- Division Three: top 2 teams promoted to Division Two. Bottom 2 teams demoted to Division Four.
- Division Four: top 2 teams promoted to Division Three.

The change in format agreed in advance of the 1985–86 NFL meant that promotion and relegation was as follows:

- Division One: bottom 2 teams demoted to Division Two
- Division Two: top 2 teams promoted to Division One. Bottom 2 teams demoted to Division Three.
- Division Three: top 2 teams promoted to Division Two.
- Division Four: top 2 teams promoted to Division Three.

=== Separation of teams on equal points ===
In the event that teams finish on equal points, then a play-off will be used to determine group placings if necessary, i.e. where to decide relegation places or quarter-finalists.

== League Tables ==
=== Division One ===
Team	Pld	W	D	L	Pts	Status
Tyrone	7	3	3	1	9	Qualified for knockout stage
Armagh	7	4	1	2	9	Qualified for knockout stage
Down	7	4	0	3	8	Qualified for knockout stage
Kildare	7	3	2	2	8	Qualified for knockout stage
Kerry	7	2	2	3	6
Meath	7	2	2	3	6
Galway	7	2	1	4	5	Relegated to Division Two of the 1985–86 NFL
Cork	7	2	1	4	5	Relegated to Division Two of the 1985–86 NFL

=== Division Two ===
==== Play-Offs ====
3 March 1985 For 2nd Place	Roscommon	0-11 — 0-7	Wexford	Athy

24 February 1985 For 6th Place	Donegal	2-7 — 2-5	Louth	Clones

==== Table ====
Team	Pld	W	D	L	Pts	Status
Monaghan	7	4	2	1	10	Qualified for knockout stage; promoted to Division One of the 1985–86 NFL
Roscommon	7	4	1	2	9	Promoted to Division One of the 1985–86 NFL
Wexford	7	4	1	2	9
Dublin	7	4	0	3	8
Mayo	7	2	2	3	6
Donegal	7	2	1	4	5
Louth	7	2	1	4	5	Relegated to Division Three of the 1985–86 NFL
Offaly	7	1	2	4	4	Relegated to Division Three of the 1985–86 NFL

=== Division Three ===
==== Play-Offs ====
17 February 1985 For 1st Place	Cavan	1-9 — 0-8	Longford	Breffni Park, Cavan

24 February 1985 For 6th Place	Laois	3-7 — 2-3	Wicklow	Dr. Cullen Park, Carlow

This result was to relegate Wicklow to Division Four of the 1985–86 NFL. The play-off turned out to be redundant because of the restructure to the league, and both teams were in Division Three of the 1985–86 NFL.

==== Table ====
Team	Pld	W	D	L	Pts	Status
Cavan	7	5	0	2	10	Qualify for knockout stages; promoted to Division Two of the 1985–86 NFL
Longford	7	5	0	2	10	Promoted to Division Two of the 1985–86 NFL
Derry	7	4	1	2	9	Placed in Division Three of the 1985–86 NFL
Leitrim	7	4	0	3	8	Placed in Division Three of the 1985–86 NFL
Clare	6	2	3	1	7	Placed in Division Three of the 1985–86 NFL
Laois	7	2	1	4	5	Placed in Division Three of the 1985–86 NFL
Wicklow	7	1	2	4	5	Placed in Division Three of the 1985–86 NFL
Antrim	6	0	0	6	0	Placed in Division Three of the 1985–86 NFL

=== Division Four ===
Team	Pld	W	D	L	Pts	Status
Carlow	7	7	0	0	14	Advance to Quarter-Final; placed in Division Three of the 1985–86 NFL
Westmeath	7	4	2	1	10	Placed in Division Three of the 1985–86 NFL
Fermanagh	7	4	1	2	9	Placed in Division Three of the 1985–86 NFL
Limerick	7	3	1	3	7	Placed in Division Three of the 1985–86 NFL
Sligo	7	3	1	3	7	Placed in Division Three of the 1985–86 NFL
Tipperary	7	2	1	4	5	Placed in Division Three of the 1985–86 NFL
Waterford	7	2	0	5	4	Placed in Division Three of the 1985–86 NFL
Kilkenny	7	0	0	7	0	Placed in Division Three of the 1985–86 NFL

== Knockout stage ==
=== Quarter-finals ===
3 March 1985

Tyrone	2-8 – 1-3	Cavan

Clones

3 March 1985

Monaghan	4-6 – 0-2	Kildare

Croke Park, Dublin

3 March 1985

Armagh	1-8 – 0-6	Carlow

Croke Park, Dublin

10 March 1985

Down	1-8 – 1-4	Roscommon

Croke Park, Dublin

=== Semi-finals ===
24 March 1985

Armagh	1-9 – 0-6	Down

Croke Park, Dublin

24 March 1985

Monaghan	1-6 – 0-9	Tyrone

Croke Park, Dublin

31 March 1985
Replay

Monaghan	1-8 – 0-8 (AET)	Tyrone

Athletic Grounds, Armagh

=== Final ===
7 April 1985
Final

Monaghan	1-11 – 0-9	Armagh

Croke Park, Dublin
Attendance: 15,226
Referee: John Gough (Antrim)
