= Mick Dempsey (Gaelic footballer) =

Irish Gaelic footballer and manager

Michael Dempsey is an Irish former Gaelic footballer and manager. He played at senior level for the Laois county team.

== Early life ==
Born to Jack Dempsey (originally from Laois) and Annie Spain (originally from County Offaly), Dempsey is one of seven children: the others are Martin, P. J., Seán, Betty (Moore), Margaret (Farrelly) and Anne Dempsey all of whom have links with the St Joseph's club.

== Playing career ==
Dempsey captained his club St Joseph's to the Laois Senior Football Championship title in 1983. He spent many years playing for the laois county team and was part of the team that won the National Football League title in 1986.

== Managerial career ==
As a manager Dempsey managed Laois to the Leinster U21 Football Championship title in 1994 and managed the Laois senior team in 1997 and 1998.

With the Carlow club O'Hanrahans coach, Dempsey led the Blues to three championships and a Leinster title (2000) in his four-year tenure.

He also managed the Muckalee and St Martins clubs in Kilkenny before joining manager Brian Cody as part of the leadership team for the Kilkenny senior hurlers in 2003.

Dempsey stepped down as part of the Kilkenny hurling backroom team in October 2019.

For the 2021 season, Dempsey was a selector for Loughmore-Castleiney in both hurling and gaelic football and helped guide the club to a second Tipperary double by winning the Tipperary Senior Football Championship and the Tipperary Senior Hurling Championship.

Preceded by Colm Browne	Laois Senior Football Bainisteoir; 1997–1998	Succeeded by Tom Cribbin
