= Mick O'Dowd =

Irish Gaelic footballer and manager

Personal information
- Native name: Micheál Ó Dubhda (Irish)
- Born: 5 November 1973 (age 52) Skryne, County Meath

Sport
- Sport: Gaelic football
- Position: -
Club
- Years: Club
- ? - ?: Skryne
Inter-county
- Years: County
- ? - ?: Meath
Inter-county titles
- Leinster titles: 1
- All-Irelands: 0
- NFL: 0
- All Stars: 0

Mick O'Dowd is a former Gaelic footballer and who was once manager of the Meath senior team.

O'Dowd previously managed his local club Skryne to success in 2004. Before that he was a member of the 2001 All-Ireland SFC final panel that lost to Galway, with Galway becoming the first team to win an All-Ireland title after having lost in their province.

In October 2012, O'Dowd was appointed as Meath manager to replace Séamus McEnaney, with his colleague Trevor Giles and Séan Kelly. In July 2016, O'Dowd stepped down as manager after four years in charge.

Preceded by Séamus McEnaney	Meath Senior Football Manager; 2012–2016	Succeeded by Andy McEntee
