= Laois county football team =

Gaelic football team

Laois
- Sport: Football
- Irish: Laois
- Nickname(s): The O'Moore County
- County board: Laois GAA
- Manager: Justin McNulty
- Captain: Charlie Donnelly
- Home venue(s): O'Moore Park, Portlaoise

Recent competitive record
- Current All-Ireland status: Leinster (QF) in 2025
- Last championship title: None
- Current NFL Division: 3 (6th in 2025)
- Last league title: 1985–86
First colours	Second colours

The Laois county football team (/liːʃ/ LEESH) represents Laois in men's Gaelic football and is governed by Laois GAA, the county board of the Gaelic Athletic Association. The team competes in the three major annual inter-county competitions; the All-Ireland Senior Football Championship, the Leinster Senior Football Championship and the National Football League.

Laois's home ground is O'Moore Park, Portlaoise. The team's manager is Justin McNulty.

The team last won the Leinster Senior Championship in 2003 and the National League in 1986. Laois has never won the All-Ireland Senior Championship.

== History ==
Laois contested the second ever All-Ireland Senior Football Championship (SFC) final in 1889.

In 1926, the county won the final of the first National Football League competition, defeating Dublin.

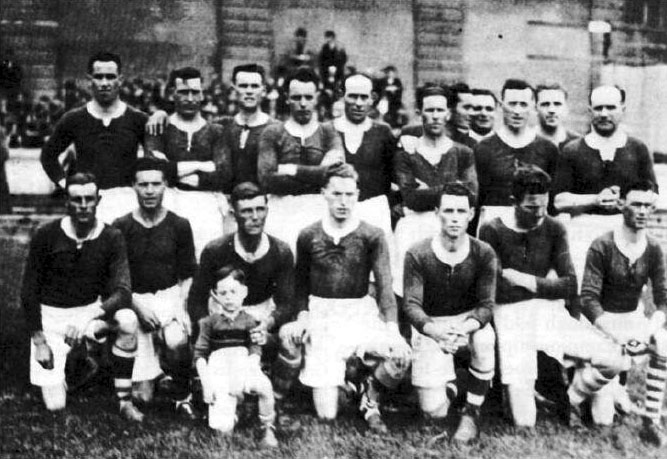
Laois team, 1936 All-Ireland runners-up

Laois's only other appearance in an All-Ireland SFC decider was in 1936.

Laois defeated Monaghan by a point in the 1985–86 National Football League final. Liam Irwin and Colm Browne both won All Stars for their performances that year. However, Wicklow knocked the team out of the Leinster SFC.

During the 1990s Laois had a number of successes at minor and under-21 level, including All-Ireland Minor Football Championships in 1996 and 1997.

During the mid-2000s Laois football became a strong force at all age levels.

Under former Kerry and Kildare manager Mick O'Dwyer, Laois finished as National Football League runner-up and Leinster Senior Football Championship winner in 2003. Laois would go on to contest the Leinster Senior Football Championship Final again in 2004 (lost after a replay) and 2005 (lost by one point). During the same period the minor county team won the All-Ireland Minor Football Championship again in 2003 and the Leinster Minor Football Championship in 2004, 2005 and 2007, while the under-21 county team won the Leinster Under-21 Football Championship in 2006 and 2007.

In 2006, Mick O'Dwyer's management of Laois ended and former Limerick manager Liam Kearns replaced him. Laois reached the finals of both the O'Byrne Cup and Leinster SFC in his first season as manager: calls for Kearns to be sacked after one season, with former players and club delegates saying "the man has to go", went unheeded.

Seán Dempsey replaced Kearns as manager after two years in 2008. Despite a poor first season, with disciplinary problems surfacing in the panel, Kildare knocking the team out of the Leinster Senior Football Championship and Down knocking the team out of the All-Ireland Senior Football Championship, Dempsey was unexpectedly retained as manager for one more year. Dempsey had led the Laois minor team to the 2003 All-Ireland title and had commenced a major re-building exercise in 2009 but without success.

Justin McNulty replaced him for the 2011 season. After three seasons in charge, McNulty stepped down to be replaced by Tomás Ó Flatharta.

Laois (in blue jerseys) take on Down during the 2024 Tailteann Cup final

Ó Flatharta lasted until 2015, resigning after a Leinster SFC quarter-final loss to Kildare and an All-Ireland SFC qualifier exit against Antrim. Mick Lillis from Clare replaced him. Lillis led Laois to the bottom of Division 2, a Leinster SFC quarter-final exit and then an All-Ireland SFC qualifier exit to Clare before he resigned in 2016. He also used seven substitutes in a win, causing the game to be replayed, complained about a fixture against Dublin being held at Nowlan Park and dropped Gary Walsh when he cursed at him after being substituted. Peter Creedon was the next manager; he too did not last long, exiting under heavy criticism from county board delegates, with Mick Lawlor claiming the county would be set "back by five or six years" if Creedon were not ousted. He went, amid allegations of a drinking culture within the squad, Laois having been relegated to Division 4 and knocked out of the All-Ireland SFC by Clare.

John Sugrue spent two seasons managing the team, guiding them to two promotions that brought them from Division Four to Division Two of the National Football League, making Round Four of the All-Ireland SFC qualifiers in both years and bringing Laois to the 2018 Leinster Senior Football Championship final before departing after the 2019 season.

== Panel ==
Team as per Laois vs Dublin in the Leinster SFC semi-final, 15 November 2020

No.	Player	Position	Club
1	Niall Corbet	Goalkeeper	Clonaslee–St Manmans
2	Trevor Collins	Right Corner Back	Graiguecullen
3	Mark Timmons	Full back	Graiguecullen
4	Robert Piggott	Left Corner Back	Portarlington
5	Sean O'Flynn	Right half back	Courtwood
6	Patrick O'Sullivan	Centre back	Portarlington
7	Eoin Buggie	Left half back	Stradbally
8	Daniel O'Reilly	Midfield	Graiguecullen
9	John O'Loughlin (c)^{RET}	Midfield	Rosenallis
10	Gareth Dillon	Right half forward	Portlaoise
11	Paul Kingston	Centre forward	Arles/Killeen
12	Brian Byrne	Left half forward	Graiguecullen
13	Evan O'Carroll	Right corner forward	Crettyard
14	Kieran Lillis	Full forward	Portlaoise
15	Gary Walsh	Left corner forward	Ballylinan

No.	Player	Position	Club
16	Matthew Byron	Substitute	Courtwood
17	Mark Barry	Substitute	O'Dempseys
18	Séamus Lacey	Substitute	Ballylinan
19	Ross Munnelly	Substitute	Arles/Kilcruise
20	Michael Keogh	Substitute	St Joseph's
21	Diarmuid Whelan	Substitute	Ballyroan Abbey
22	Alan Farrell	Substitute	Ballylinan
23	Shane Bolger	Substitute	Killeshin
24	Brian Daly	Substitute	St Joseph's
25	David Seale	Substitute	Portlaoise
26	Denis Booth	Substitute	The Heath

Currently abroad: Stephen Attride

^{INJ} Player has had an injury which has affected recent involvement with the county team.
^{RET} Player has since retired from the county team.
^{WD} Player has since withdrawn from the county team due to a non-injury issue.

== Management team ==
- Manager: Justin McNulty
- Coaches: Vacant

== Managerial history ==
Laois have a history of appointing "foreign" managers, with Mick O'Dwyer proving to be the most successful; O'Dwyer led Laois to the 2003 Leinster SFC (a first in 57 years) and then to three All-Ireland SFC quarter-finals in his four years in charge. However, by 2015, Laois had also acquired a reputation for appointing managers who lasted two years or less, with journalist Martin Breheny commenting that "there seems to be an inflated view of self-worth in the county" and that the manager "becomes the easy scapegoat" as a result of those heightened expectations.

Laois managers, since the 1980s, have included:

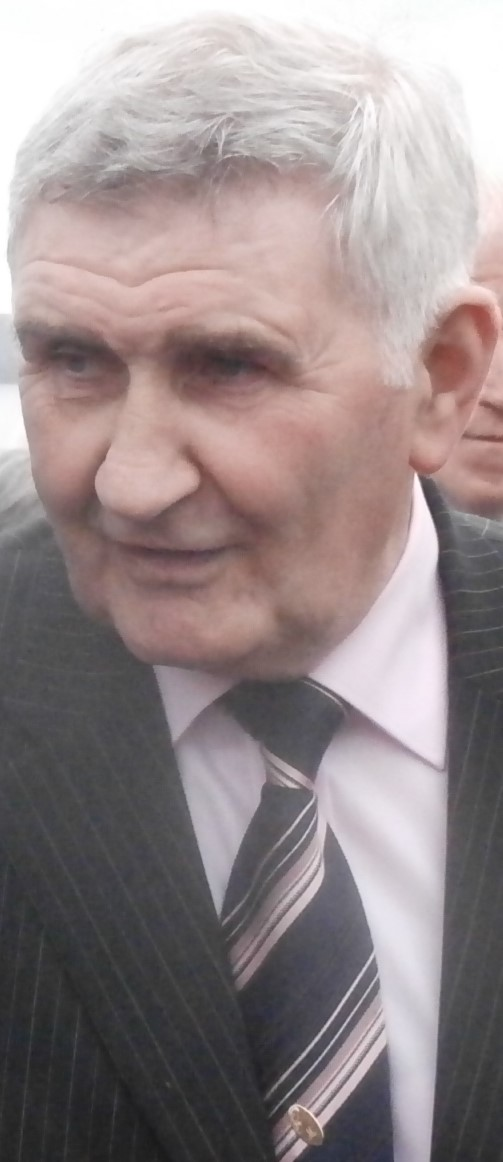
Mick O'Dwyer led Laois to the 2003 Leinster Senior Football Championship title.

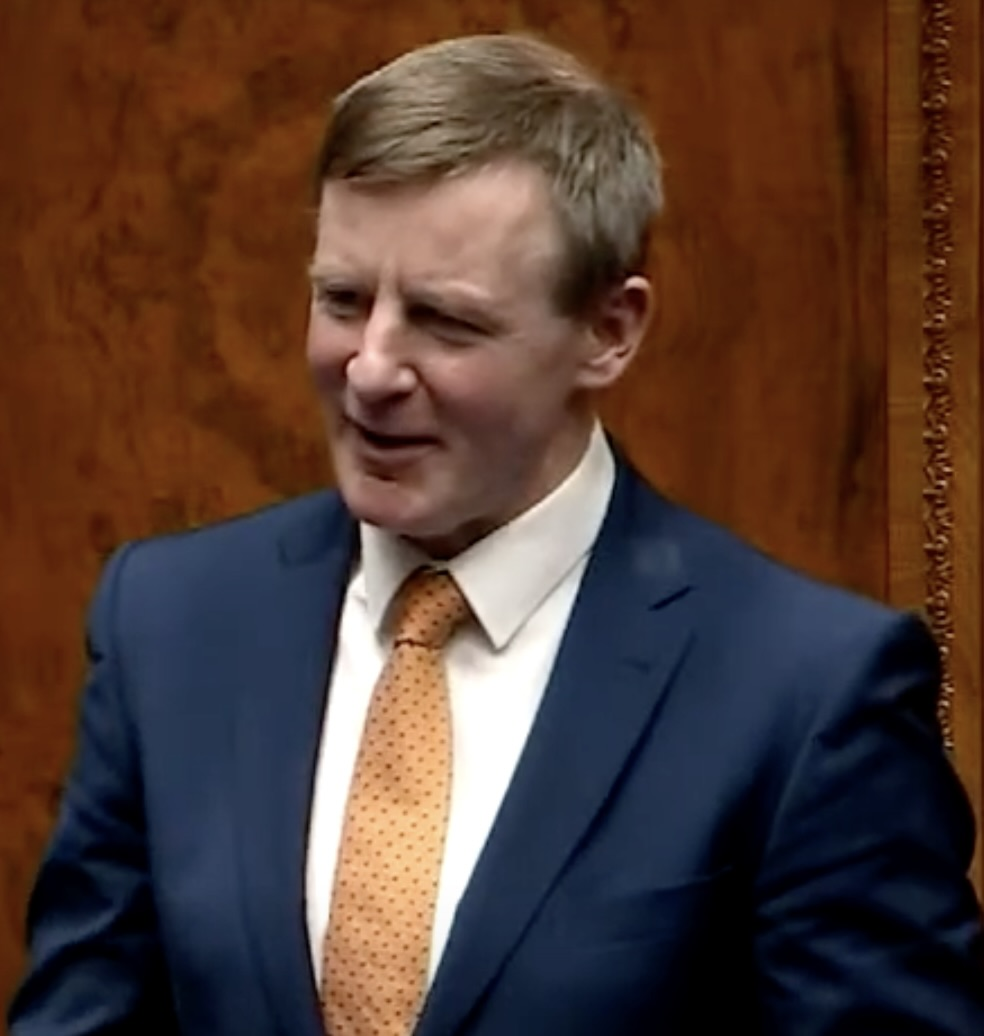
Justin McNulty has served two spells as Laois manager.

Dates	Name	Origin	Honours
1987–1989	Bobby Miller	Timahoe	
1989–1993	Richie Connor		1991 O'Byrne Cup, 1993 All-Ireland Senior B Football Championship
1993–1996	Colm Browne	Portlaoise	1994 O'Byrne Cup
1996–1998	Mick Dempsey	St Joseph's	—N/a
1998–2000	Tom Cribbin		—N/a
2000–2002	Colm Browne (2)	Portlaoise	—N/a
2002–2006	Mick O'Dwyer		2003 Leinster Senior Football Championship, 2005 O'Byrne Cup
2006–2008	Liam Kearns		—N/a
2008–2010	Seán Dempsey	St Joseph's	—N/a
2010–2013	Justin McNulty		—N/a
2013–2015	Tomás Ó Flatharta		—N/a
2015–2016	Mick Lillis	Portlaoise	—N/a
2016–2017	Peter Creedon		—N/a
2017–2019	John Sugrue		—N/a
2019–2021	Mike Quirke		—N/a
2021–2023	Billy Sheehan		—N/a
2023–	Justin McNulty (2)		—N/a

== Players ==
=== Records ===
==== Most appearances ====
1st and 2nd: Ross Munnelly, Michael Lawlor

3rd: John O'Loughlin: 167 appearances

=== All Stars ===
Laois has 5 All Stars.

1986: Colm Browne, Liam Irwin
2003: Fergal Byron, Joe Higgins, Tom Kelly

== Honours ==
=== National ===
- All-Ireland Senior Football Championship
  - (silver) Runners-up (2): 1889, 1936
- National Football League
  - (gold) Winners (2): 1925–26, 1985–86
  - (silver) Runners-up (1): 2003
  - (bronze) Semi-finalists (5): 1952, 1978, 1994, 1995, 1997
- National Football League Division 4
  - (gold) Winners (2): 2018, 2024
- All-Ireland Senior B Football Championship
  - (gold) Winners (1): 1993
- All-Ireland Junior Football Championship
  - (gold) Winners (1): 1973
- All-Ireland Under-21 Football Championship
  - (silver) Runners-up (3): 1964, 1998, 2007
- All-Ireland Minor Football Championship
  - (gold) Winners (3): 1996, 1997, 2003
  - (silver) Runners-up (3): 1932, 1967, 1998

=== Provincial ===
- Leinster Senior Football Championship
  - (gold) Winners (6): 1889, 1936, 1937, 1938, 1946, 2003
  - (silver) Runners-up (15): 1929, 1940, 1943, 1947, 1951, 1959, 1963, 1968, 1981, 1985, 1991, 2004, 2005, 2007, 2018
- O'Byrne Cup
  - (gold) Winners (5): 1978, 1987, 1991, 1994, 2005
- Leinster Junior Football Championship
  - (gold) Winners (5): 1907, 1941, 1968, 1973, 1993
- Leinster Under-21 Football Championship
  - (gold) Winners (8): 1964, 1969, 1982, 1987, 1994, 1998, 2006, 2007
  - (silver) Runners-up (4): 1975, 1986, 1999, 2009
- Leinster Under-20 Football Championship
  - (silver) Runners-up (2): 2019, 2020
- Leinster Minor Football Championship
  - (gold) Winners (9): 1932, 1966, 1967, 1996, 1997, 1998, 2004, 2005, 2007
  - (silver) Runners-up (7): 1933, 1964, 1968, 1973, 1995, 2003, 2016
