= 2018 Leinster Senior Football Championship =

Football championship

2018 Leinster SFC
Tournament details
- Year: 2018

Winners
- Champions: Dublin (57th win)
- Manager: Jim Gavin
- Captain: Jonny Cooper

Runners-up
- Runners-up: Laois
- Manager: John Sugrue
- Captain: Graham Brody and John O'Loughlin

The 2018 Leinster Senior Football Championship was the 2018 installment of the annual Leinster Senior Football Championship organised by Leinster GAA.

Dublin, the defending champions, won their eighth consecutive championship title, defeating Laois in the final.

== Teams ==
The Leinster championship was contested by 11 of the 12 county teams in Leinster, a province of Ireland. Kilkenny was the only county team not to compete.

Team	Colours	Sponsor	Manager	Captain	Most recent success
Team	Colours	Sponsor	Manager	Captain	All-Ireland	Provincial
Carlow	Red, green and gold	Tickets.ie	Turlough O'Brien	John Murphy		1944
Dublin	Sky blue and navy	American International Group	Jim Gavin	Stephen Cluxton	2017	2017
Kildare	White	Brady Family Ham	Cian O'Neill	Eoin Doyle	1928	2000
Laois	Blue and white	MW Hire Services	John Sugrue	Stephen Attride		2003
Longford	Royal blue and gold	Glennon Brothers	Denis Connerton	Donal McElligott		1968
Louth	Red and white	Morgan Fuels	Pete McGrath	Andy McDonnell	1957	1957
Meath	Green and gold	Devenish Beyond Nutrition	Andy McEntee	Bryan Menton	1999	2010
Offaly	White, green and gold	Carroll's Cuisine	Stephen Wallace	Anton Sullivan	1982	1997
Westmeath	Maroon and white	Renault	Colin Kelly	John Heslin		2004
Wexford	Purple and gold	Gain Feeds	Paul McLoughlin	Daithí Waters	1918	1945
Wicklow	Blue and gold	Arklow Bay Hotel	John Evans	Seánie Furlong

== Draw ==
First round
Laois (a.e.t.)	2-21
Wexford	1-18
Louth	0-12
Carlow	2-17
Offaly	1-15
Wicklow (a.e.t.)	1-20

Quarter-finals
Westmeath	1-12
Laois	4-13
Kildare	1-10
Carlow	2-14
Dublin	4-25
Wicklow	1-11
Meath	0-14
Longford	0-16

Semi-finals
Laois	0-12
Carlow	0-8
Dublin	2-25
Longford	0-12

Final
Laois	0-10
Dublin	1-25

=== Preliminary round ===
12 May 2018
18:30
Preliminary round

Report

Laois	2-21 (27) – (21) 1-18 (a.e.t.)	Wexford
(HT: 0-03 – 1-10) (FT: 1-15 – 1-15)
Gls: Donie Kingston, Benny Carroll; Pts: Donie Kingston (6, 3f), Ross Munnelly (5, 2f), Paul Kingston (3), Stephen Atttride (2), Gareth Dillon, Trevor Collins, David Conway, Gary Walsh, Darren Strong		Gls: Naomhan Rossiter; Pts: Donal Shanley (9, 6f, 1 pen, 1 '45), John Tubritt (4), Glen Malone, Shane Doyle, James Stafford, Ben Brosnan

Wexford Park, Wexford
Referee: Martin McNally (Monaghan)

13 May 2018
14:00
Preliminary round

Report

Louth	0-12 (12) – (23) 2-17	Carlow
(HT: 0-09 – 0-10)
Pts: G. McSorley 3, T. Durnin 2, W. Woods 2, R. Burns 2 (2f), J. Craven 1, D. Byrne 1, H. Osbourne 1		Gls: D. Walshe 1, P. Broderick 1 Pts: P. Broderick 8 (5f), D. Walshe 2, D. Foley 2 (1f), D. Ledger 1 (1f), S. Murphy 1, E Ruth 1, S. Gannon 1, L. Walker 1 (1f)

O'Moore Park, Portlaoise
Referee: Niall Cullen (Fermanagh)

13 May 2018
16:00
Preliminary round

Report

Offaly	1-15 (18) – (23) 1-20 (a.e.t.)	Wicklow
(HT: 1-05 – 0-05) (FT: 1-11 – 0-14)
Gls: A. Sullivan 1 Pts: B. Allen 3, A. Sullivan 2 (1f), S. Tierney 2, N. Darby 2f, A. Mulhall 2f, N. Dunne 1f, C. Donohue 1, J. Hayes 1, G. Spollen 1		Gls: D. Fitzgerald 1 Pts: M. Jackson 7 (5f, 2 ’45), S. Furlong 5 (4f), J. McGrath 2, M. Kenny 2, D. Hayden 1f, J. Crowe 1, D. Healy 1, C. Magee 1

O'Moore Park, Portlaoise
Referee: Jerome Henry (Mayo)

=== Quarter-finals ===
26 May 2018
5:30 pm
Quarter-final

Report

Westmeath	1-12 (15) – (25) 4-13	Laois
(HT: 0-06 – 0-10)
Gls: M McCallon 1 Pts: L Loughlin 4 (2f), G Egan 3 (1f), F Coyne 2, K Martin 1, J Connellan 1 (1f), R O’Toole 1		Gls: P Kingston 3, E O’Carroll 1 Pts: R Munnelly 3 (3f), P Kingston 2, N Donoher 2, T Collins 1, C Begley 1, A Farrell 1, D Kingston 1 (1f), E O’Carroll 1, G Walsh 1

O'Connor Park, Tullamore
Referee: Padraig Hughes (Armagh)
Attendance: 6,186

27 May 2018
2:00 pm
Quarter-final

Report

Kildare	1-10 (13) – (20) 2-14	Carlow
(HT: 1-03 – 1-08)
Gls: D Flynn 1 Pts: P Cribbin 3, K Feely 3 D Flynn 2, K Cribbin 1		Gls: D Foley 1, C Lawlor 1 Pts: P Broderick 11 (9f), D Foley 1, S Gannon 1, C Moran 1

O'Connor Park, Tullamore
Referee: Cormac Reilly (Meath)
Attendance: 5,111

27 May 2018
3:00 pm
Quarter-final

Report

Longford	0-16 (16) – (14) 0-14	Meath
(HT: 0-07 – 0-07)
Pts: J McGivney 4, D Gallagher 3, R Brady 2, P Collum 1 (1'45), D Mimnagh 1, C Berry 1, D Reynolds 1, D McGivney 1 (1f), R Smyth 1, S McCormack 1		Pts: G Reilly 3, P Kennelly 2, D Lenihan 2 (2f), S Curran 1, D Keogan 1, B Menton 1, B Brennan 1, M Burke 1, Joey Wallace 1, E Wallace 1

Pearse Park, Longford
Referee: Sean Hurson (Tyrone)
Attendance: 5,591

27 May 2018
4:00 pm
Quarter-final

Report

Dublin	4-25 (37) – (14) 1-11	Wicklow
(HT: 4-13 – 1-04)
Gls: C Kilkenny 1, B Fenton 1, C O'Callaghan 1, D Rock 1 Pts: Ciarán Kilkenny 1-7, Brian Fenton and Con O'Callaghan 1-3 each, Dean Rock 1-2 (0-2f), Paddy Andrews 0-3, Conor McHugh 0-2 (0-1f), Philly McMahon, Michael Darragh McCauley, Brian Howard, Paul Mannion (1 '45), Colm Basquel 0-1 each		Gls: J Stafford 1 Pts: James Stafford 1-1, Mark Jackson (0-2f), Darren Hayden, Theo Smyth 0-2 each, Dean Healy, Rory Finn, Mark Kenny, Seanie Furlong (0-1f) 0-1 each

O'Moore Park, Portlaoise
Referee: Ciaran Branagan (Down)
Attendance: 11,786

=== Semi-finals ===
10 June 2018
2:00pm
Semi-final

Report

Laois	0-12 (12) – (8) 0-08	Carlow
(HT: 0-06 – 0-03)
Pts: D Kingston 3 (2f), R Munnelly 2 (2f), A Farrell 1, J O'Loughlin 1, B Glynn 1, F Crowley 1, N Donoher 1, C Begley 1, E O'Carroll 1		Pts: P Broderick 5 (4f), D Walshe 1, D O'Brien 1, D Foley 1 (1f)

Croke Park, Dublin
Referee: Fergal Kelly (Longford)

RTÉ

10 June 2018
4:00pm
Semi-final

Report

Dublin	2-25 (31) – (12) 0-12	Longford
(HT: 2-13 – 0-07)
Gls: P Mannion 1, D Rock 1 Pts: Dean Rock 1-6 (0-5f), Paul Mannion 1-2, Brian Fenton and Ciarán Kilkenny 0-4 each, Con O'Callaghan and Colm Basquel 0-2 each, Philly McMahon, Brian Howard, James McCarthy, Niall Scully, Paddy Andrews 0-1 each		Pts: Robbie Smyth 0-5 (0-3f), Paddy Collum (1 '45), Michael Quinn, Donal McElligott, Dessie Reynolds 0-1, David McGivney (0-1f), Rian Brady, Sean McCormack 0-1 each

Croke Park, Dublin
Referee: Maurice Deegan (Laois)
Attendance: 39,028

=== Final ===
24 June 2018; 4:00 pm	Dublin	1-25 - 0-10	Laois	Croke Park; Attendance: 41,728; Referee: Barry Cassidy (Derry)
24 June 2018; 4:00 pm	Dean Rock 0-8 (0-5f, 1 '45), Ciaran Kilkenny 1-4, Cormac Costello 0-4, Brian Fenton, Con O'Callaghan, Paddy Andrews 0-2 each, Brian Howard, Niall Scully, Paul Mannion 0-1 each	Report	Donie Kingston 0-4 (0-2f), Alan Farrell and Gary Walsh 0-2 each, Kieran Lillis and Evan O'Carroll 0-1 each	Croke Park; Attendance: 41,728; Referee: Barry Cassidy (Derry)

== See also ==
- 2018 All-Ireland Senior Football Championship
  - 2018 Connacht Senior Football Championship
  - 2018 Munster Senior Football Championship
  - 2018 Ulster Senior Football Championship
