= Ryan Wylie =

Monaghan Gaelic footballer

Personal information
- Born: 12 March 1994 (age 32)
- Occupation: Radiographer

Sport
- Sport: Gaelic football
- Position: Corner back
Club
- Years: Club
- 2011 – Present: Ballybay Pearse Brothers
Club titles
- Monaghan titles: 2
College
- Years: College
- 2012 - 2016 1 Sigerson Cup: UCD
Inter-county
- Years: County
- 2013 – present: Monaghan county team
Inter-county titles
- Ulster titles: 2

Ryan Wylie (born 1994) is a Gaelic footballer who plays for Ballybay Pearse Brothers and the Monaghan county team. He took over as captain of Monaghan in 2020 and captained them again in 2021.

== Career ==
=== Club ===
Wylie has won two County titles with Ballybay, in 2012 and 2022.

=== County ===
Wylie was part of the team that won the 2015 Ulster Senior Football Championship. He was also on the panel for the 2013 Championship win. He was part of the team that reached the All Ireland semi final in 2018, a first appearance at this stage of the competition since 1988.

== Personal life ==
His brother Drew is also a Gaelic footballer with Ballybay and Monaghan.

He works as Radiographer in the Mater Hospital and comes from a Protestant family.

He was captain of Monaghan when, in July 2021, the community was numbed following the tragic death of Under-20s captain Brendán Óg Duffy in a car crash on his way home from his team's Ulster semi final defeat of Donegal.
