= Noel Garvan =

Irish Gaelic footballer

Personal information
- Nickname: Garvo
- Born: 29 September 1978 (age 48) Ireland
- Height: 1.93 m (6 ft 4 in)

Sport
- Sport: Gaelic football
- Position: Midfield
Club
- Years: Club
- ? -?: St Joseph's
Club titles
- Laois titles: 2
Inter-county
- Years: County
- ?- ?: Laois
Inter-county titles
- Leinster titles: 1

Noel Garvan is a former inter-county Gaelic footballer from County Laois.

He plays for the St Joseph's club. He usually played at midfield for Laois and played a huge part in 2003 when Laois ended the 57-year wait for the Leinster Senior Football Championship title.

Garvan emerged on to the scene in 1996 as part of the Laois minor team that won the All-Ireland Minor Football Championship title.

Son of Tommy Garvan, himself no mean operator on a football field, Noel Garvan caught the eye with his spectacular high fielding as a minor and quickly progressed through the ranks picking up a Leinster U21 Football Championship medal in 1998 before adding a Sigerson Cup title to his honours list in 1999 when he also won the Player of the Tournament award with IT Tralee.

After a spectacular 2005 campaign in which he captained his county to the O'Byrne Cup, Garvan received a well-deserved All Stars nomination. In the same year, he won an Interprovincial Championship medal with his province Leinster.

With St Joseph's, Garvan has picked up two Laois Senior Football Championship medals.
