= Seán Dempsey =

Laois Gaelic footballer and manager

Personal information
- Native name: Seán Ó Diomsaigh (Irish)
- Nickname: Kang
- Born: County Laois, Ireland

Sport
- Sport: Gaelic football
- Position: Forward
Club
- Years: Club
- St Joseph's
Club titles
- Leinster titles: 0
Inter-county
- Years: County
- Laois

Seán Dempsey is an Irish Gaelic football manager, coach, selector and former player. He played at minor, under-21 and senior level for the Laois county team. Dempsey later managed Laois at minor, under-21 and senior level and has been involved with the St Joseph's club, as well as several clubs in other counties (e.g. Dublin, Offaly).

== Early life ==
Born to Jack Dempsey (originally from Laois) and Annie Spain (originally from County Offaly), Dempsey is one of seven children: the others are Martin, Michael, P. J., Betty (Moore), Margaret (Farrelly) and Ann (Smith), all of whom have links with the St Joseph's club.

== Playing career ==
As a player, Dempsey was a member of the St Joseph's club, winning four Laois Senior Football Championship titles with them.

After his minor football career, he graduated to become a member of the Laois under-21 and senior football panels, playing alongside his brothers Martin and Mick for a number of years.

== Post-playing career ==
Dempsey was Laois GAA's Football Officer from 1997 until 2007. He was chairman of the Leinster Provincial Council Football Committee between 2009 and 2014.

During his spell with Laois minors he coached the underage teams. Dempsey led the team to the 2003 All-Ireland Minor Football Championship title and to the 2004 Leinster Minor Football Championship title.

He was selector under Val Andrews when Leinster won consecutive Railway Cup titles in 2005 and 2006.

He led Laois to successive Leinster Under-21 Football Championship titles in 2006 and 2007. He also led the team to an All-Ireland Under-21 Football Championship final appearance in 2007, where they were defeated by Cork.

Dempsey was appointed manager of the Laois senior team on the night of 15 September 2008. Despite a poor first season, with disciplinary problems surfacing in the panel, Kildare knocking the team out of the Leinster Senior Football Championship and Down knocking the team out of the All-Ireland Senior Football Championship, Dempsey was unexpectedly retained as manager for one more year. After two relatively unsuccessful years in the position, he was relieved of the job in July 2010.

Dempsey was later confirmed as manager of Kildare GAA club Naas.

Dempsey was involved when Jack Sheedy managed Longford to promotion from Division 4 of the 2015 National Football League.

He managed Offaly GAA club Ferbane to an Offaly Senior Football Championship title in 2019.

In December 2020, he was named as manager of Dublin Senior Football Championship club Ballinteer St John's.

As of 2021, he was his club's coaching officer. He also managed the senior Laois ladies' county team.

Gaelic games
Preceded by Liam Kearns	Laois Senior Football Manager; 2008–2010	Succeeded by Justin McNulty
