= Tony Griffin (hurler) =

Clare hurler and coach

Personal information
- Born: 11 January 1981 (age 45) Ballyea, County Clare

Sport
- Sport: Hurling
- Position: Corner-forward
Club
- Years: Club
- 1999–: Ballyea
Club titles
- Clare titles: 1
- Munster titles: 1
Inter-county
Years	County	Apps (scores)
2002–2009	Clare	33 (10–66)
Inter-county titles
- Munster titles: 0
- All-Irelands: 0
- NHL: 0
- All Stars: 1

Tony Griffin is a former inter-county hurler who retired from that in November 2009. He has since worked as a coach, including with the Kerry county football team which won the Sam Maguire Cup in 2022.

Tony also cycled the entire length of Canada in 49 days raising 1.2 million euros for charity

== Playing career ==
=== College ===
He played for NUI Galway in the Fitzgibbon Cup.

=== Inter-county ===
In 2000, he was called up to the Clare inter-county team under Ger Loughnane.

In 2006, Griffin was inducted into the GAA All-Star team in the left corner forward position. He had been nominated for an All-Star in twice previously, in 2004 and 2005.

On 16 November 2009, Griffin retired from inter-county hurling with Clare, citing a lack of 'confidence in the current management structure' as one of the main reasons for doing so.

== Coaching ==
Griffin joined the Kerry county football team as a performance coach ahead of the 2022 season, a year when Kerry won the Sam Maguire Cup. Kerry forward David Clifford paid tribute to him after being named All Stars Footballer of the Year.

Jack O'Connor, the Kerry manager, also had Griffin involved when he was managing Kildare (before O'Connor returned for his third spell as Kerry manager), and Griffin was also involved with the Dublin county hurling team when Anthony Daly was manager.

Griffin left the Kerry team at the end of the 2024 season, though O'Connor continued as manager.

== Personal life ==
=== Cycle For Cancer ===
In 2007, Griffin took a year out of hurling to do a cycle across Canada in memory of his father Jerome, who died from cancer.
