= Mick Lillis =

Laois Gaelic footballer and manager

Personal information
- Native name: Micheal Laighleas (Irish)

Sport
- Sport: Gaelic football
Inter-county management
- Years: Team
- Laois

Mick Lillis is a Gaelic games coach and manager and former player. He played for the Laois county football team, later managing them and has also been involved with numerous clubs in several counties. As well as managing winning senior championship teams in Laois with Portlaoise, he also guided St Laurence's in Kildare and Palatine in Carlow to county titles.

== Biography ==
Lillis is a native of Cooraclare, County Clare, but played most of his club football career with Portlaoise and briefly played with the Laois senior football team.

Lillis was working as masseur for the Wexford senior football team in 2005 when he received a four-week ban from the Laois GAC following an under-16 football league final between Portlaoise and Stradbally, which also led to Portlaoise senior club treasurer JP Cahillane receiving a six-month suspension for "verbal abuse and physical interference of the referee".

Laois appointed Lillis as their senior football manager in 2015. After a defeat to Dublin in the 2016 Leinster Senior Football Championship, Laois went on to beat Armagh in the qualifiers, but fell short against Lillis's native Clare in the next round. Lillis tendered his resignation as manager of the Laois senior football team shortly afterwards. Lillis led Laois to the bottom of Division 2, a Leinster SFC quarter-final exit and then an All-Ireland SFC qualifier exit to Clare before he resigned in 2016. He also used seven substitutes in a win, causing the game to be replayed, complained about a fixture against Dublin being held at Nowlan Park and dropped Gary Walsh when he cursed at him after being substituted.

Lillis succeeded Niall Carew as Ballylinan manager ahead of the 2020 season.

Ahead of the 2022 season, Lillis joined Offaly GAA club Shamrocks, assisting manager Brian Kelly (the former Carlow captain).

Sporting positions
Preceded by Tomás Ó Flatharta	Laois Senior Football Manager; 2015–2016	Succeeded by Peter Creedon
