= Joe Higgins (Gaelic footballer) =

Irish Gaelic footballer

Personal information
- Born: Kellyville, County Laois

Sport
- Sport: Gaelic Football
- Position: Corner back
Club
- Years: Club
- St Joseph's
Club titles
- Laois titles: 2
Inter-county
- Years: County
- 1999-2009: Laois
Inter-county titles
- Leinster titles: 1
- All Stars: 1

Joe Higgins is a former Gaelic footballer from County Laois.

In 1998, Higgins added a Leinster Under-21 Football Championship title to his list of honours.

== Honours ==
Club

- 2 Laois Senior Football Championship 1996, 2000
- 2 Laois All-County Football League 2001, 2010

Inter-county

- 1 Leinster Under-21 Football Championship 1998
- 1 Leinster Minor Football Championship 1997
- 1 All-Ireland Minor Football Championship 1997
- 1 Leinster Senior Football Championship 2003

Individual

- 1 All Star 2003
