= Tom Cribbin =

Gaelic football manager

Tom Cribbin is a Gaelic football manager who, as of 2021, was in charge of Kildare GAA club Clane. He has managed three county teams: Laois, Offaly and Westmeath.

== Career ==
Cribbin was born in County Laois in May 1963. He moved to Kildare when he was 12, and it was as player–manager of Clane that he made his mark, guiding them to two county titles in four years. In 2002, after his spell with Laois had ended, he managed the Kildare county minor team, as well as having spells in charge of Edenderry and a return to his home club, Clane. He is classed as a Kildare manager.

Cribbin was an unexpected appointment as Laois manager in 1998 and the vote to appoint him was split. He managed Laois in 1999 and 2000. He left the post in 2000, with Westmeath having defeated Laois in the Leinster Senior Football Championship in Tullamore..

He was appointed Offaly manager in February 2009, resigning in 2011.

He was appointed Westmeath manager in November 2014. He led Westmeath to victory against neighbour Meath and then to consecutive Leinster SFC finals in 2015 and 2016 (a first in the team's history), also winning the 2017 National Football League Division 4 title before he stepped down at the conclusion of the 2017 season.

At the end of 2021, Clane announced Cribbin as its manager.

Sporting positions
Preceded by Mick Dempsey	Laois Senior Football Manager; 1998–2000	Succeeded by Colm Browne
Preceded by Richie Connor	Offaly Senior Football Manager; 2009–2011	Succeeded by Gerry Cooney
Preceded by Paul Bealin	Westmeath Senior Football Manager; 2014–2017	Succeeded by Colin Kelly
