= Peter Creedon =

Gaelic football manager

Personal information
- Native name: Peadar Ó Críodáin (Irish)
- Born: Rosscarbery, County Cork, Ireland
- Occupation: Secondary school principal

Sport
- Sport: Gaelic football
Inter-county management
- Years: Team
- 2012–2015 2016–2017 2021–: Tipperary; Laois; Tipperary ladies'
Inter-county titles as manager
County	League	Province	All-Ireland
Tipperary	0	0	0

Peter Creedon is a Gaelic football manager. He is originally from Rosscarbery, County Cork He has managed two county teams: Tipperary and Laois and currently manages the Tipperary Ladies football team

== Early life ==
Creedon worked as the principal of St Ailbe's and now is principal of Colaiste Dun Iascaigh (Schools in Tipperary Town and Cahir) and lives in Thurles. He is a former coach of the Cahir senior football team and of his former local team Roscarbery, and was in charge of the Tipperary minor and under-21 football teams from 2003 to 2008.

== Tipperary ==
Creedon managed the Tipperary senior football team, appointed on 28 March 2012 before leaving in July 2015. He took over from John Evans, who resigned on 18 March after Tipperary's defeat to Sligo in the Allianz League.

After Kerry defeated Tipp in the 2013 Championship Creedon called for the introduction of an All-Ireland 'B' Championship.

He left the Tipperary job in July 2015 due to time constraints as he had become school principal of Coláiste Dún Iascaigh in Cahir.

== Laois ==
In September 2016, Creedon took over as the manager of the Laois senior football team on a two-year contract. In July 2017, Creedon stepped down as Laois manager after one year in charge.

== Since ==
In October 2018, he was appointed manager of the Tipperary minor team. In October 2021, he was appointed manager of the Tipperary ladies'.

Sporting positions
Preceded by Tom O'Connor	Tipperary Minor Football Manager; 2003–2006	Succeeded by Philly Ryan
Preceded by Séamus McCarthy	Tipperary Under-21 Football Manager; 2006–2008	Succeeded by John Evans
Preceded by John Evans	Tipperary Senior Football Manager; 2012–2015	Succeeded by Liam Kearns
Preceded by Mick Lillis	Laois Senior Football Manager; 2016–2017	Succeeded by John Sugrue
