= Justin McNulty =

Irish politician and former Armagh footballer (born 1974)

Justin McNulty MLA
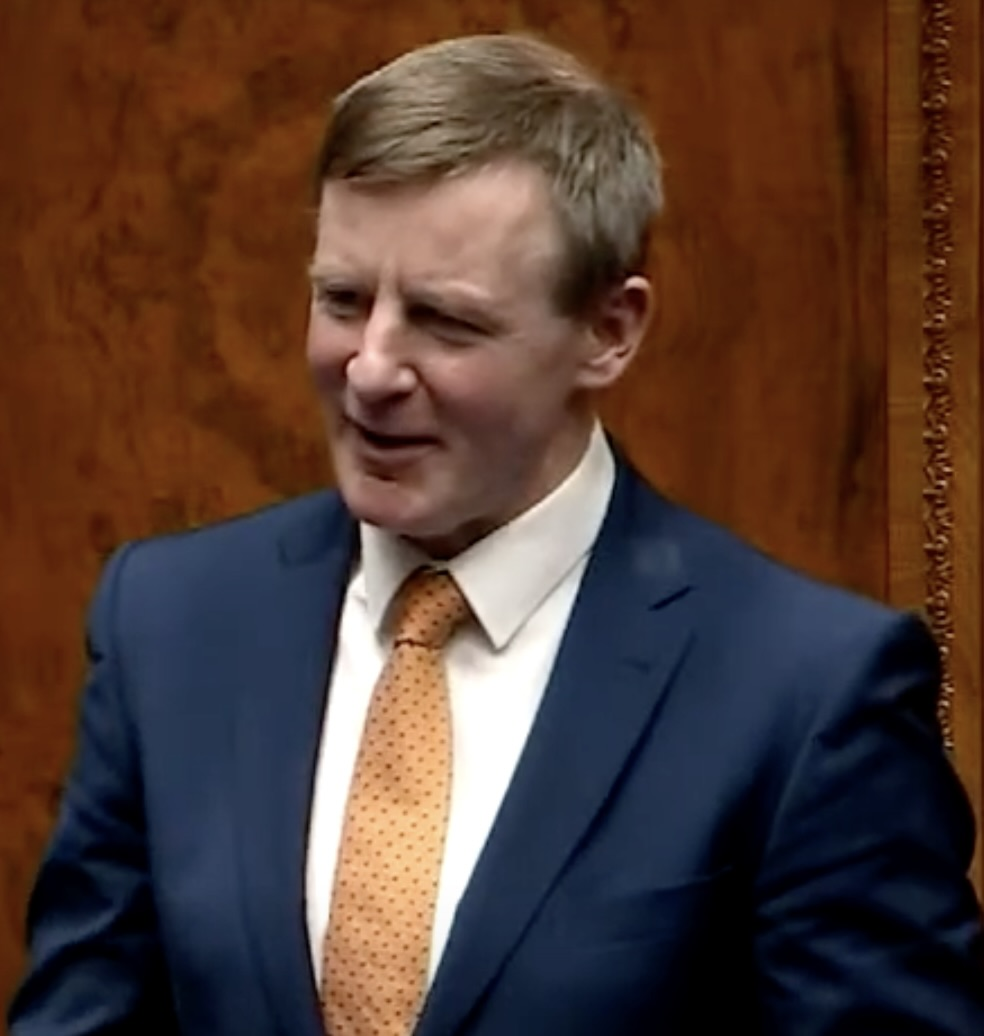
- McNulty in 2024

Member of the Northern Ireland Assembly for Newry and Armagh
- Incumbent
- Assumed office 7 May 2016
- Preceded by: Dominic Bradley

Personal details
- Party: SDLP
- Gaelic games career
- Native name: Justin Mac an Ultaigh (Irish)
- Born: 15 November 1974 (age 51) Lislea, County Armagh, Northern Ireland
- Height: 6 ft 0 in (183 cm)
- Sport: Gaelic football
- Position: Full-Back
Club
- Years: Club
- Mullaghbawn
Club titles
- Armagh titles: 1
- Ulster titles: 1
Inter-county
- Years: County
- 1995–2005: Armagh
Inter-county titles
- Ulster titles: 5
- All-Irelands: 1
- NFL: 1

Justin McNulty MLA (born 15 November 1974) is an Irish politician, a Gaelic football manager, and a former player at senior level for the Armagh county team. He has served as a Member of the Legislative Assembly (MLA) for Newry and Armagh since 2016.

McNulty played football for the Mullaghbawn Cúchullain's club in Armagh and also played at senior level for the Armagh county team from 1995 to 2005. He won an All-Ireland Senior Football Championship (SFC) medal in 2002 while playing in the full-back position.

== Sporting career ==
The Lislea-born McNulty played for Mullaghbawn alongside his twin brother Paul and their younger brother, Enda. Justin made his senior inter-county debut for Armagh in 1995 in a league game against Louth. He won 5 Ulster SFC medals and won an All-Ireland SFC medal when Armagh defeated Kerry by a scoreline of 1–12 to 0–14 in the 2002 All-Ireland Senior Football Championship final. In 2005 McNulty retired from inter-county football. Management followed soon after and Justin led Mullahoran Dreadnoughts to a Cavan Senior Football Championship title in 2006.

The following year Justin managed St Brigid's GAA (Dublin), who was narrowly beaten in the 2007 Dublin County Final by St Vincent's who went on to win the All Ireland. In late 2009 he was appointed as an Armagh selector under the management of Paddy O'Rourke.

In August 2010, after Seán Dempsey resigned as Laois manager, McNulty was appointed as his successor. McNulty's first season proved a success as Laois gained promotion to the top tier of the National Football League, despite losing the league decider to Donegal. McNulty left Laois in August 2013.

While still an MLA, McNulty was reappointed as Laois manager in 2023.

== Political career ==
McNulty contested his home constituency of Newry and Armagh for the SDLP in the 2015 general election. Despite losing to Sinn Féin candidate Mickey Brady, McNulty polled 12,026 votes, a 24.1% share which represented a 1500 vote increase on the previous election.

McNulty was elected to the 6th Northern Irish Assembly on 3 March 2017 for the SDLP. In the general election of 2017, McNulty saw his share of the vote drop to 16.9% Newry and Armagh with his Sinn Féin rivals vote increasing by 6.8%. In the 2022 Northern Ireland Assembly election, McNulty's vote share fell further to 10.8%. The impact of independent candidate Gavin Malone standing in the election, appears to have both candidates fighting for the same share of the vote in the Newry area.

On 3 February 2024, which saw the restoration of the Executive, McNulty left Stormont "without seeking permission" to attend a GAA match in County Wexford as the manager of the Laois football team. The SDLP subsequently suspended McNulty and he sat as an Independent Nationalist. McNulty had the SDLP whip restored on 20 August 2024.

On 1 October 2026, McNulty was de-selected as the SDLP candidate for Newry and Armagh and the next Northern Ireland Assembly election. He had previously rejected attempts to convince him to run in the neighbouring Upper Bann constituency.

Northern Ireland Assembly
Preceded by Dominic Bradley	MLA for Newry and Armagh; 2016-present	Incumbent
Sporting positions
Preceded by Seán Dempsey	Laois Senior Football Manager; 2010–2013	Succeeded by Tomás Ó Flatharta
Preceded by Billy Sheehan	Laois Senior Football Manager; 2023–	Succeeded by Incumbent
