= St Joseph's GAA (Laois) =

GAA club in south east of County Laois, Ireland

St Josephs GAA
- Naomh Seosamh
- Founded: 1954
- County: Laois
- Nickname: The Saints
- Colours: Yellow and blue
- Grounds: Tony Byrne Park, Kellyville
- Coordinates: 52°59′21.49″N 7°05′23.15″W

Playing kits
Standard colours

Senior Club Championships
	All Ireland	Leinster champions	Laois champions
Football:	-	-	10

St Joseph's GAA is a Gaelic Athletic Association Gaelic football club in south eastern County Laois, Ireland. It won ten Laois Senior Football Championship titles between 1973 and 2023. The club colours are yellow with blue trim. The main club grounds are located at Kellyville (north of Ballintubbert) with a secondary grounds at Milltown (west of Ballylinan).

== History ==
Founded in 1954 as an underage club, it won the Laois minor and junior football titles in 1967, the minor title again in 1968, the Laois Intermediate Football Championship in 1969 and a further junior title in 1976. In 2022, they added a third minor title to their huge collection of trophies.

St Joseph's progressed to win ten Laois Senior Football Championship titles: in 1973, 1975, 1977, 1978, 1983, 1989, 1994, 1996, 2000 and 2023

The club (in an amalgamation with Barrowhouse) won the Under-21 Championship in 2008, 2011, 2015 and 2016.

St Joseph's ladies won the Laois LGFA junior title in 2017 and won the Intermediate title in 2024.

It is a parish team and is made up of the four small areas represented on the club crest: Ballyadams, Luggacurren, The Swan and Wolfhill.

== Notable players ==
- Mick Dempsey
- Seán Dempsey
- Noel Garvan
- Joe Higgins
- Tom Kelly, All Star (2003) and International Rules Series Player of the Series (2005)

== Honours ==
- Laois Senior Football Championships: (10) 1973, 1975, 1977, 1978, 1983, 1989, 1994, 1996, 2000, 2023
- Laois All-County Football League Division One: (9) 1971, 1987, 1991, 1993, 1995, 2001, 2010, 2022, 2024
- Laois All-County Football League Division 3: 2005, 2010
- Laois Intermediate Football Championship 1969
- Laois Junior Football Championships 1967, 1976, 2017
- Laois Under-21 Football Championship (4) (with Barrowhouse) 2008, 2011, 2015, 2016
- Laois Minor Football Championship (3) 1967, 1968, 2022
- Laois Junior C Football Championship 2024
- Laois LGFA Junior Championship 2017
- Laois LGFA Intermediate Championship 2024
