= Séamus McEnaney =

Irish Gaelic football manager, businessman and slumlord

Personal information
- Nickname: Banty
- Born: 1967 or 1968 (age 57–58) Corduff, County Monaghan, Ireland

Sport
- Sport: Gaelic football
Inter-county management
- Years: Team
- 2004–2010 2010–2012 2016–2017 2019–2022: Monaghan; Meath; Wexford; Monaghan
Inter-county titles as manager
County	League	Province	All-Ireland
Monaghan Meath	0	0	0

Séamus McEnaney (born 1967/1968) is a Gaelic football manager and businessman. He has managed his native Monaghan county team (in two spells), as well as the Meath and Wexford county teams.

== Personal life ==
His brother Pat is a former inter-county referee.

== Business career ==
McEnaney is in charge of Westenra Arms Hotel in the town of Monaghan.

In December 2021, The Irish Times reported that the McEnaney controlled company Brimwood Ltd had been given payments of €15.78 million (including VAT) from the Irish state for asylum seeker accommodation (direct provision) at eight different properties across five counties in 2020, the largest sum given to any company for that purpose. As well as County Monaghan, other properties are in County Cavan, County Dublin, County Louth and County Meath. Brimwood's portfolio includes Dún Na Rí House Hotel, Airport Manor Hotel, Carnbeg Hotel, Setanta Guesthouse, Alverno House, San Giovanni House, Lisanisk House Hotel and Treacy's Hotel.

== Managerial career ==
=== Monaghan ===
McEnaney managed the Monaghan senior football team from 2004 until 2010. Where he led his side to a National Football League Division 2 title in 2005. He also led Monaghan to a first Ulster Senior Football Championship final in 19 years in 2007 and again in 2010 but lost out to Tyrone both times.

=== Meath ===
McEnaney was appointed as Meath manager in November 2010. He resigned in 2012 after Dublin defeated Meath by three points in the 2012 Leinster Senior Football Championship final, and Laois defeated Meath by three points again six days later in the fourth round of the All-Ireland qualifiers.

=== Wexford ===
In October 2016, McEnaney was announced as Wexford senior manager on a three-year deal.

Yet he did not complete the three years on offer. He resigned as Wexford senior manager after one season in August 2017, blaming the distance he had to travel; the driving from his house in Carrickmacross to Ferns in Wexford was, he said, "a 500km round trip... I'd leave my house at 3.0pm to head to training and I wouldn't be back again until midnight. The driving was the single biggest reason because the county board and the players were top class. We had whatever we needed and the respect, commitment and attitude of the players couldn't be questioned." He immediately began his search for a nearer post; within days of announcing his departure from Wexford he submitted his name for the then vacant Donegal senior football manager role that ultimately went to Declan Bonner.

=== Return to Monaghan ===
McEnaney led Monaghan to an Ulster Minor Football Championship in 2018. He was linked with the Down senior football manager role.

In August 2019, McEnaney's return as Monaghan senior football team manager was confirmed. In September 2021, following his suspension for bringing the Association into disrepute, Monaghan announced McEnaney would be retained as manager for a third year. He left at the end of the 2022 season.

==== Suspension ====
On 8 April 2021, amid the COVID-19 pandemic in the Republic of Ireland, the Irish Independent reported that Minister for Justice Helen McEntee had received photographic evidence and video footage of Monaghan footballers collectively training in late March and thus breaching the COVID-19 Level 5 restrictions then in force. Minister McEntee sent the details to both the Garda Síochána and Croke Park. The incident occurred at Corduff GAA club near Carrickmacross and members of the county's management team were implicated. The Department of Justice confirmed that it had received the information and passed it on to the Garda Síochána, the GAA and the Department of Health. Gardaí launched an enquiry into the matter. Hours later, Monaghan GAA announced it was suspending McEnaney for 12 weeks after the team manager admitted involvement in breaching the Level 5 restrictions and said it would comply with a GAA investigation into the incident. Minister Jack Chambers told RTÉ: "My officials from the Department of Sport have been in touch with the GAA to reemphasise that all breaches undermine the broader public health messaging". Former GAA president Seán Kelly said: "It's terrible to see it happening, officially organised, in a GAA club, by a county team... Saying you can't start training until two or three weeks after other counties would be a good place to start" as an additional punishment, he said. GAA president Larry McCarthy said the GAA's reputation had been damaged.

Sporting positions
Preceded by Colm Coyle	Monaghan Senior Football Manager; 2004–2010	Succeeded by Eamonn McEneaney
Preceded by Eamonn O'Brien	Meath Senior Football Manager; 2010–2012	Succeeded by Mick O'Dowd
Preceded by David Power	Wexford Senior Football Manager; 2016–2017	Succeeded by Paul McLoughlin
Preceded by Malachy O'Rourke	Monaghan Senior Football Manager; 2019–2022	Succeeded by Vinny Corey
