= Tomás Ó Flatharta =

Irish Gaelic football manager

Personal information
- Born: County Kerry, Ireland

Sport
- Sport: Gaelic football
Inter-county management
- Years: Team
- 2005–2009 2010–2011 2013–2015: Westmeath; Galway; Laois

Tomás Ó Flatharta is a Gaelic football manager who is originally from County Kerry. He has managed three county teams: Westmeath, Galway and Laois.

== Playing career ==
Durling his playing days, Ó Flatharta played for his local An Ghaeltacht club and, later, for Dublin GAA club Kilmacud Crokes, with whom he was a member of the 1995 All-Ireland Senior Club Football Championship winning side.

== Managerial career ==
=== Westmeath ===
Ó Flatharta managed Westmeath from 2005 to 2009 where he succeeded Kerry's Páidí Ó Sé. Ó Flatharta resigned as manager in July 2009 after Westmeath were beaten in the qualifiers by neighbours Meath.

When appointed as Westmeath manager Ó Flatharta was a banker based in Dublin and had been team trainer and selector during the previous two years.

=== Galway ===
In October 2010, Ó Flatharta was confirmed as the new Galway manager to succeed former Armagh player Joe Kernan, who resigned early in the summer after a poor season. In August 2011 the Galway County Board decided to relieve him of his post after Galway had been relegated to Div 2 of the National Football League and failed to win a championship match.

=== Laois ===
Following the departure of Justin McNulty, Ó Flatharta was drafted in as favourite for the vacant Laois job. In October 2013, Ó Flatharta was confirmed as Laois manager to replace McNulty. He stepped down as manager in July 2015 following their shocking exit against Antrim.

== Honours ==
Westmeath manager

- National League 2: 2006, 2008

Sporting positions
Preceded by Páidí Ó Sé	Westmeath Senior Football Manager; 2005–2009	Succeeded by Brendan Hackett
Preceded by Joe Kernan	Galway Senior Football Manager; 2010–2011	Succeeded by Alan Mulholland
Preceded by Justin McNulty	Laois Senior Football Manager; 2013–2015	Succeeded by Mick Lillis
