= Micheál Quirke =

Irish Gaelic football and basketball player

Personal information
- Native name: Mícheál Ó Coirc (Irish)
- Born: 1980 (age 45–46) Tralee, County Kerry
- Occupation: GAA coach
- Height: 6 ft 7 in (201 cm)

Sport
- Sport: Gaelic football
- Position: Midfield
Club
- Years: Club
- 1998–present: Kerins O'Rahilly's
Club titles
- Kerry titles: 1
- Munster titles: 0
- All-Ireland Titles: 0
Inter-county
Years	County	Apps (scores)
2003–2011	Kerry	24 (0–1)
Inter-county titles
- Munster titles: 4
- All-Irelands: 4
- NFL: 1
- All Stars: 0

Micheál 'Mike' Quirke (born 1980 in Tralee, County Kerry) is an Irish former sportsperson and Gaelic football manager. He played football for the Kerins O'Rahilly's club and was a member of the Kerry county team from 2003 onwards. He also played basketball.

In retirement from playing, Quirke became a manager at inter-county level.

== Early life and family ==
Quirke is a great-grandnephew of Denis Curran who won an All-Ireland medal with Kerry in 1903.

== Playing career ==
Quirke won the Kerry Senior Football Championship and reached the Munster Senior Club Football Championship with O'Rahillys in 2002. He was never selected for Kerry in the All-Ireland Minor Football Championship, but was a member of the under-21 team which played in the 2002 All-Ireland Under-21 Football Championship.

He was first selected for the Kerry senior panel in 2002, appearing against Tyrone in the National Football League. His first All-Ireland Senior Football Championship game came against Clare in 2004. During Quirke's time in the squad, Kerry won the All-Ireland Senior Football Championship in 2002, 2004, 2006 and 2007 and 2009, as well as the Munster Senior Football Championship in 2003, 2004, 2005 and 2007 and the National Football League in 2004 and 2006 and 2009. Quirke never established himself in the starting team with Kerry and was mainly seen as a squad player filling in when other first choice players were unavailable.

Like his Kerry teammate Kieran Donaghy, Quirke is also a talented basketball player and has won two basketball National Cups with the Abrakedabra Tralee Tigers. As in Donaghy's case, however, Quirke's basketball career was severely curtailed by football commitments since he became a Kerry player.

== Managerial career ==
Quirke was ratified as manager of the Laois senior team in October 2019. He resigned at the end of the 2021 season after a run of poor results.

He was a Kerry selector under the management of Jack O'Connor between 2021 and 2024.

Sporting positions
Preceded by John Sugrue	Laois Senior Football Manager; 2019–2021	Succeeded by Billy Sheehan
