= Paul Finlay =

Monaghan Gaelic footballer

Personal information
- Nickname: Jap
- Born: Monaghan, Ireland
- Height: 1.85 m (6 ft 1 in)

Sport
- Sport: Gaelic Football
- Position: Right Half Forward
Club
- Years: Club
- ? - 2024: Ballybay Pearse Brothers
Club titles
- Monaghan titles: 2
College
- Years: College
- IT Sligo
College titles
- Sigerson titles: 1
Inter-county
Years	County	Apps (scores)
2003 - 2016	Monaghan	168 (5-544)
Inter-county titles
- Ulster titles: 2
- NFL: 3

Paul Finlay is an Irish Gaelic footballer who plays for Ballybay Pearse Brothers. He played at senior level for the Monaghan county team between 2002 and 2016.

Finlay is the son of former Monaghan footballer Kieran "Jap" Finlay. He won an All-Ireland title with the Monaghan Vocational Schools and played a role in Sligo IT's Sigerson Cup win in 2002. He has also won Minor and Intermediate medals with Ballybay Pearses. Finlay was first selected for the Monaghan senior team in 2003. He was regarded as the team's playmaker and participated in their 2005 National Football League Division Two win, Monaghan's first national title in twenty years. In 2008 Finlay was called up to the Ireland international rules football team as a replacement for Tommy Walsh of Kerry.

== Honours ==
- Ulster Senior Football Championship (2): 2013, 2015
- National Football League, Division 2 (2): 2014, 2005
- National Football League, Division 3 (1): 2013
- Monaghan Senior Football Championship (2): 2012, 2022
