= 2007 Leinster Minor Football Championship =

Flag of Leinster

The 2007 Leinster Minor Football Championship is the Minor "knockout" competition in the game of football played in the province of Leinster in Ireland. The series of games are organised by the Leinster GAA.

== Draw ==
=== First round ===
Game	Date	Venue	Team A	Score	Team B	Score	Report
Leinster MFC; MFC Round 1	7 April	Ballyragget	Laois	4–20	Kilkenny	0–6	
Leinster MFC; MFC Round 1	7 April	Wexford	Westmeath	1–16	Wexford	1–5	
Leinster MFC; MFC Round 1	7 April	Aughrim	Wicklow	2–14	Offaly	0–8	
Leinster MFC; MFC Round 1	7 April	Parnell Park	Dublin	2–11	Meath	1–7	
Leinster MFC; MFC Round 1	7 April	Longford	Longford	2–7	Carlow	2–4	
Leinster MFC; MFC Round 1	7 April	Drogheda	Louth	1–12	Kildare	0–13	

=== MFC Qualifiers Round 1 ===
Game	Date	Venue	Team A	Score	Team B	Score	Report
Leinster MFC; MFC Qualifier	14 April	Newbridge	Offaly	1–14	Kildare	1–10	
Leinster MFC; MFC Qualifier	14 April	Dr. Cullen Park	Carlow	2–12	Meath	3–8	

=== MFC Qualifiers Round 2 ===
Game	Date	Venue	Team A	Score	Team B	Score	Report
Leinster MFC; MFC Qualifier	28 April	Dr. Cullen Park	Carlow	2–9	Wexford	1–7	

=== Last 8 ===
Game	Date	Venue	Team A	Score	Team B	Score	Report
Leinster MFC; Quarter Final	12 May	Arklow	Louth	1–12	Wicklow	1-03	
Leinster MFC; Quarter Final	12 May	Dr Cullen Park	Carlow	2–13	Westmeath	0–13	
Leinster MFC; Quarter Final	12 May	Pearse Park	Offaly	2-08	Longford	0–12	
Leinster MFC; Quarter Final	12 May	Parnell Park	Dublin	1–13	Laois	0–16	AET
Leinster MFC; Quarter Final Replay	16 May	Portlaoise	Dublin	1-03	Laois	2–12	

=== Semi-final ===
Game	Date	Venue	Team A	Score	Team B	Score	Report
Leinster MFC; Semi Final	30 June/4 July	Croke Park	Louth	0–9	Carlow	1–10	
Leinster MFC; Semi Final	30 June/4 July	O'Moore Park	Offaly	1–8	Laois	2–16	

=== Final ===
Game	Date	Venue	Team A	Score	Team B	Score	Report
Leinster MFC; Final	15 July	Croke Park	Carlow	1–12	Laois	3–8	
