= John Sugrue =

Gaelic football manager

Sport
Inter-county management
- Years: Team
- 2017–2019: Laois

John Sugrue is a Gaelic games coach and manager. He has been in charge of the Laois county football team, the Kerry under-20 football team and is currently involved with the Laois county hurling team as a physio.

Sugrue is from Renard, County Kerry.

Laois appointed Sugrue football manager in 2017. As Laois football manager, Sugrue achieved consecutive promotions from Division Four to Division Two of the National Football League, brought the team to the 2018 Leinster Senior Football Championship final and to round four of the All-Ireland Senior Football Championship qualifiers in 2018 and 2019. He unexpectedly resigned in July 2019.

Sugrue succeeded Jack O'Connor as manager of the Kerry under-20 football team in October 2019. He decided to depart in November 2020, having led the team to a Munster Under-20 Football Championship title the previous March.

Sugrue joined Séamus Plunkett's Laois county hurling team as a physio in 2021.

Sporting positions
Preceded by Peter Creedon	Laois Senior Football Manager; 2017–2019	Succeeded by Micheál Quirke
