= Liam Irwin =

Irish Gaelic footballer

Liam Irwin is a former Gaelic football player with Laois in Ireland.

Nicknamed "George", he played at midfield and in 1986 was part of the Laois team that won the county's second National Football League title.

Liam also picked up an All-Star award that year.

In 1992, Liam won his only Laois Senior Football Championship title with his club Ballyroan.

- 1 Leinster Under 21 Football Championship 1982
- 1 National Football League Division 1 1986
- 1 All Star 1986
- 1 Laois Senior Football Championship 1992
