= Colm Browne =

Laois Gaelic footballer and manager

Colm Browne was a Gaelic footballer and manager with Laois. He also managed the Tipperary senior football team.

Browne won numerous honours in the game including an All-Ireland Senior Club Football Championship with his club Portlaoise in 1983, a National Football League title with Laois in 1986 (and captaining that team) and an All Stars Award in 1986.

Browne is a member of the Garda Síochána at Templemore.

He was ratified as manager of the Laois senior team in 2000 and left in 2002.

Sporting positions
Preceded by Richie Connor	Laois Senior Football Manager; 1994–1996	Succeeded by Mick Dempsey
Preceded by Tom Cribbin	Laois Senior Football Manager; 2001–2002	Succeeded by Mick O'Dwyer
