= Kieran Finlay =

Monaghan Gaelic footballer

Personal information
- Nickname: Jap

Sport
- Sport: Gaelic football
- Position: Forward
Club
- Years: Club
- Ballybay Pearse Brothers
Club titles
- Monaghan titles: 1
Inter-county
- Years: County
- Monaghan county team
Inter-county titles
- Ulster titles: 2
- NFL: 1

Kieran "Jap" Finlay (died 2012) was a Gaelic footballer who played for Ballybay Pearse Brothers and at senior level for the Monaghan county team and the father of Paul Finlay.

He had two Ulster Championship medals in his back pocket (from 1979 and 1985), a National League medal (from 1985) in his other pocket and four Dr McKenna Cup medals in another pocket and gave a particularly outstanding account of himself in the 1979 Ulster Final, helping himself to a goal and nine, only to get ill and die. On the club front he helped himself to a Senior football championship medal in 1987, three senior football league medals, an All Ireland Colleges medal, Brennan Cup, junior championship, minor league and championship medals, and Monaghan's Senior Footballer of the Year for 1983, his performance in the 1979 Ulster final for Monaghan was only broken up by Armagh's Oisín McConville when he came along and played for Armagh, after playing as a forward and making a name for himself as one of Monaghan's finest in the forward line, then Finlay became involved in club administration and did a turn as Assistant Secretary of the County Board.

Paul Finlay, who inherited the "Jap" name, said of his father's illness: "I do have a strong memory of being out with him in 1989. He was still training and we were at the pitch one day and he was running. And he took a pain in his chest. He was calling me to pull up. He was sent straight up to the Mater for a stress test but they never let him out. He needed open heart surgery. So that was a big thing for him because he was keeping fit and coming to the end of his playing days and he was just 36."
