= Hogan Stand =

Gaelic games magazine in Ireland

Hoganstand.com is a news website and the online face of the monthly Gaelic games magazine Hogan Stand, which is distributed throughout Ireland. The magazine is named after the main stand in Croke Park, where the trophies are presented to the winning captains. The magazine was founded in 1991. The website also has a fan chat forum.
