= Monaghan county football team =

Gaelic football team

Monaghan
- Sport: Football
- Irish: Muineachán
- Nickname(s): The Farney Army; The Oriel county
- County board: Monaghan GAA
- Manager: Gabriel Bannigan
- Captain: Ryan Wylie
- Home venue(s): St Tiernach's Park, Clones

Recent competitive record
- Current All-Ireland status: QF in 2026
- Last championship title: None
- Current NFL Division: 1 (8th in 2026; relegated to Division 2)
- Last league title: 1984–85
First colours	Second colours

The Monaghan county football team (/ˈmɒnəhən/ MON-ə-hən) represents Monaghan in men's Gaelic football and is governed by Monaghan GAA, the county board of the Gaelic Athletic Association. The team competes in the three major annual inter-county competitions; the All-Ireland Senior Football Championship, the Ulster Senior Football Championship and the National Football League.

Monaghan's home ground is St Tiernach's Park, Clones.

The team last won the Ulster Senior Championship in 2015 and the National League in 1985. The team has not yet won a senior All-Ireland competition.

== History ==
=== Early years ===
Football was recorded in Inniskeen in 1706 in a poem. Monaghan were prominent in Ulster championship competitions during the period 1914-30, and one of the first Ulster counties to contest an All-Ireland final.

=== 1930–1978 ===
Monaghan beat Kildare in a semi-final to reach the 1930 All-Ireland Senior Football Championship Final, where Kerry beat them by 3–11 to 0-2 without their goalkeeper touching the ball.

=== 1979–1988 ===
Seán McCague managed the team from the late 1970s. He managed his county team to the 1979 Ulster Senior Football Championship (SFC) title and then led it to two further Ulster SFC titles, as well as the National Football League title. The 1979 title win was Monaghan's first for 41 years.

In 1979, the Monaghan team won the Ulster Senior Football Championship for the first time in 41 years with a defeat of Donegal. In the final Monaghan Kieran Finlay scored 1–9, which was a record in an Ulster final for 20 years, until Armagh forward Oisín McConville bettered it with a 2–7 tally against Down in 1999. They also won the Dr McKenna Cup in 1979. That year, in the Ceannarus Tournament, they also beat Roscommon and Dublin. In the All-Ireland Senior Football Championship 1979 semi-final at Croke Park, Monaghan were again beaten by Kerry, 5–14 to 0–7.

In 1984, Monaghan reached the Centenary Cup final following wins over Limerick, Mayo, Offaly (quarter final) and Derry (semi-final after extra time) The Offaly and Derry games were played in Croke Park as was the final against Meath which Monaghan lost by 0–10 to 0–8. Monaghan also won Division 3 of the National Football League that year and lost to Meath in the quarterfinal.

1985 was the county's most successful year to date. A National Football League final victory against Armagh in 1985 created a momentum that peaked in 1985 when future Monaghan manager Eamonn McEneaney kicked an equalizing point from 48 metres out near the sideline beside the Hogan Stand to draw the All-Ireland semi-final against Kerry on a scoreline of Monaghan 2–9 to Kerry's 1-12. Kerry won the replay on a 2–9 to 0–10 score.

Monaghan won that National Football League title of 1985 on a 1–11 to 0–09 score against pre-match favourites Armagh. The game was effectively settled by an Eamon McEneaney penalty in the first half when referee John Gough from Antrim decided that an Armagh defender had taken too many steps in his own penalty area. Armagh got to within a point in the second half, but a flurry of long-range points from Bernie Murray, Eamon McEneaney and Ray McCarron brought the trophy to Monaghan for the first time.

That year's Ulster Senior Football Championship was also a success. An easy first-round victory over Donegal in Castleblayney was marked by a Eamon Murphy goal. Following was a lucky draw against Armagh in the semi-final and one-point victory. Paddy Linden saved a penalty, while an Armagh player saw the line barely 30 seconds after coming onto the field as a substitute, following an apparent high tackle on Declan Flanagan. In the replay, despite a late Armagh goal, Monaghan won by 1–11 to 2–7.

Monaghan met Derry in the Ulster Senior Football Championship final. Eamon McEneaney helped himself to 2–4 as Monaghan recorded an easy 2–9 to 0–8 win. In the drawn All-Ireland semi-final against Kerry, the absence of David Byrne through injury in the second half probably cost Monaghan victory. Despite Eamon McEneaney's last-gasp equaliser, Kerry won by 5 points.

The team was missing Declan Loughman, Gerry Hoey and Bernie Murray, all with broken legs. All three were prominent in the National Football League win over Armagh while they would form the spine of the Ulster SFC winning side of 1988.

Monaghan reached the 1986 National Football League final, but this time the opposition was Laois. Played in front of over 30,000 supporters the Laoismen edged out Monaghan by 2–6 to 2–5. Monaghan's championship run in 1986 consisted of a draw against Down in Castleblayney thanks to a last gap Eamon McEneaney free while in the replay Down emerged victors in Newcastle on a 2–11 to 0–11 score.

In 1987, Monaghan reached the National Football League semi-final again where they played against Kerry at Croke Park. A second-half performance against the wind had Monaghan leading by a couple of points near the end but a Pat Spillane goal and a late point by Mikey Sheehy saw the Kingdom win by 2–11 to 2–9. Monaghan's goals came from Mick O'Dowd and Hugo Clerkin. However, the Ulster championship was a shock 0–14 to 0–12 loss to Cavan in Breffni Park.

In 1988, the team reached the National Football League semi-final again but ended in a 4–12 to 1–8 drubbing from Dublin at Croke Park. However a good league run prior to that had rescued a season where relegation to Division 2 of the National Football League seemed possible. During that league run the team also changed management.

In the 1988 All Ireland semi-final against Cork, Monaghan held out against a gale-force wind in the first half and were 0–8 to 0–1 behind at the break. Goalkeeper Paddy Linden had saved a penalty from Larry Tompkins. Two early second-half points brought Monaghan to within 5 points. A controversial goal following an apparent foul on Monaghan's Brendan Murray rocked the Monaghan revival, and Cork took over. Linden's display in that match was a significant factor in him being the first Ulster goalkeeper to receive an All-star award that year.

Also in 1988 was an Ulster title win over Tyrone when a "Nudie" Hughes goal following a fumble by Tyrone keeper Aidan Skelton saw Monaghan win by 1–10 to 0-11. In the game, all Monaghan's scores came from play. Previous wins over Cavan (0-16 to 0-14), again marked by strong performance from Nudie Hughes, and Down (1-11 to 0-09) had brought Monaghan to the Ulster final.

=== 1989–2006 ===
In 1989 Monaghan scraped home with an 0–08 to 0–05 win against Antrim in Casement Park, Belfast, where the homesters literally kicked the game away. Down ended Monaghan's run in Castleblayney a few weeks later.

The 1990s and early part of the 2000s were lean years for the county. Notable wins in that period were championship successes over Donegal in 1995 and defending All-Ireland champions Armagh in 2003. They won the Dr McKenna Cup in 1995 against Derry and in 2003 against Tyrone.

Another noticeable effort was a dramatic second-half display against Derry in 1992, which saw a 9-point deficit hauled back to earn a draw. Wins were also recorded over Antrim in 1990 and Cavan in 1993 and 1994. After losses to Fermanagh in 1999 and 2000, a win over them was recorded in 2001.

The National Football League run of 1998 saw Monaghan qualify from a "group of death" that included Tyrone, Dublin, Kerry, Cavan and Sligo to qualify for the quarter-finals against Down in Croke Park. Behind at one stage early in the second half by 1–05 to 0-02, the Down goal scored by James Mc Cartan, a rally with goals by Darren Swift and Stephen Mc Ginnitty and a point by Peter Duffy gave Monaghan a surprise 2–05 to 1–06 win. They then lost the semi-final against Derry on a score of 1–12 to 0-08. The game had a bit of controversy too when a Mark Daly goal was disallowed, and a Monaghan player was sent off. During the Ulster Senior Football Championship meeting between both sides a few weeks later. Monaghan's Edwin Murphy was sent off on the advice of a linesman, but video evidence subsequently cleared him. Monaghan ultimately lost the game to Derry.

At senior level in 1999, the county U-21 side won the Ulster championship over Donegal thanks to a last-gasp super point from Kieran Tavey. The run ended with a 2–10 to 0–08 defeat to eventual champions Westmeath in Croke Park.

At minor level, the county U-18 team reached the Ulster minor league finals in 2000 and 2002, losing to Tyrone on both occasions by a point. The team reached the Ulster championship final in 2001 for the first time in 18 years, but they lost 2–13 to 0–13 again to Tyrone, including a late missed penalty when only 4 points separated the sides. In 2001 the Vocational Schools team won the Ulster and All-Ireland championships.

In 2005, the county contested the Division 2 National Football League final against Meath at Croke Park. A last-gasp point from Paul Finlay in the final league game against Longford in Clones earned the team a draw and automatic promotion to Division 1 for the first time in 18 years. In the league semi-final against Derry in Clones, a goal within 15 seconds of the throw in by Tommy Freeman set Monaghan on their way, and despite Rory Woods being sent off Monaghan held out for a 1–13 to 1–11 win.

In the NFL Division 2 final, during injury time Meath looked like holding onto a 2-point victory. However a Paul Finlay free with the last kick of the game from 40 yards out was deflected into the Meath net by a Meath player, and Monaghan won 3–13 to 3-12. This game preceded the National Football League final which saw Armagh overcome Wexford to gain their first league title. This was Monaghan's first visit to Croke Park in 7 years, that resulting in a 1–12 to 0–08 defeat in a National Football League semi-final to Derry back in 1998.

Derry gained revenge in the Ulster Senior Football Championship with a 1–17 to 2–08 win, but "back door" wins over London, Wexford and Louth brought Monaghan to a last 12 meeting with eventual All-Ireland champions Tyrone in Croke Park. The tactic of isolating Tommy Freeman up front caused havoc for Tyrone in the first 25 minutes as they leaked 1-05, the goal by Freeman. However, a Tyrone player was brought back to double mark Freeman, and the Farney threat was quashed. Tyrone won 2–14 to 1-07, limiting Monaghan to a single point from a free in the second half. Ryan McMenamin had been suspended following an incident in the Ulster final and missed the game, but he returned for the quarter-final against Dublin. Freeman's exploits in the summer of 2005 brought him an All-star nomination and an "Irish News" Ulster All Star award on the "40".

2006 saw Monaghan compete in Division 1A of the National Football League, but after wins to Dublin and a draw with Offaly, the team's season ended in the championship qualifiers with a 0-08 to 0-06 defeat to Wexford.

The team also reached the Dr McKenna Cup final early in the year but lost to Tyrone. The Ulster championship started with a 0–10 to 0–10 draw against eventual Ulster champions Armagh in rain soaked Clones. Six days later Armagh emerged victorious on a 1–13 to 0–10 score. Two missed goal opportunities on the day proved costly. A 2–19 to 3–05 win over Wicklow in the qualifiers saw Monaghan meet Wexford in Clones. The game saw continuous rain and wet conditions, and the performance of the referee grabbed headlines on the day. Wexford who had Matty Forde controversially on board following an incident against Offaly for which he would be subsequently suspended won out by 0–08 to 0-06.

=== 2007 season ===
2007 saw Monaghan compete in Division 2A of the National Football League. Though the team had a backroom clean-out of trainers and selectors, the introduction of Tyrone native Martin Mc Elkennon to the Oriel set up contributed to a run of seven successive victories in matches: away to Roscommon, home to Longford and Carlow, away to Clare, away trips to London, home to Offaly, away to Leitrim.

The semi-final match was against Meath. The Ulster Championship saw Monaghan play in the quarter-final against the winners of Cavan and Down; who meet in the preliminary round. If successful there they would play the winners of Derry and Antrim in the semi-final. Having avoided the "big 2," namely Armagh and Tyrone, this was viewed as Monaghan's best chance of reaching an Ulster final for the first time in 19 years. Monaghan reached the Dr McKenna Cup semi-final where they lost to Tyrone in Kingspan Breffni Park, Cavan on 13 February 2007. They had initially qualified from Section A of the competition as runners up to Armagh.

==== National Football League Division 2A ====
In the National Football League, Monaghan won all their seven games, including high-scoring first halves against Roscommon, Longford and Carlow. Next up was an away trip to London that Monaghan easily won by 0–16 to 1-05. During the game against Offaly in the penultimate round in Clones, a last-gasp Paul Meegan point in injury time was enough to give Monaghan a 0–13 to 0–12 win, guaranteeing them a semi-final place as table toppers and a position in the revamped Division 2 in 2008. This was achieved with the team's 15 April win against Leitrim, 1–14 to 2–10.

The league semi-final against Meath was played in Croke Park. Two early Meath goals gave the team a cushion, and at half time Monaghan went in 2–04 to 0–05 in arrears. Early in the second half Monaghan condceded a third goal, and despite a late Monaghan rally Meath won 3–10 to 0–12. It was obvious from this game that Monaghan's full back line and team in general needed a major overhaul prior to the Ulster championship meeting against Down in Newry on 10 June.

==== Ulster Senior Football Championship ====
Páirc Esler in Newry was the venue for Monaghan's first game of the Ulster championship where they faced a Down team who had disposed of Cavan in the preliminary round after a replay. Ciarán Hanratty announced his arrival on the county stage with a 2-goal salvo, which inspired Monaghan to a 2–15 to 1-15 success. The defence had tightened up considerably, and Paul "Jap" Finlay scored several late points near the end. In the semi-final against Derry in Casement Park on 24 June, Monaghan beat Derry by 0–14 to 1-09. Though Paul Finlay was out due to illness, his replacement Rory Woods had a strong performance brought much-needed bulk and skill to trouble Derry's vaunted defence.

The final set for 15 July in the home of Ulster football that is Clones was between Monaghan and Tyrone. Paul Finlay had been awaiting results for a viral infection but ultimately Finlay started the match: a match which Tyrone won by a scoreline of 1–15 to 1-13. A goal by Philip Jordan after 6 minutes put Tyrone in the driving seat, but Monaghan came back to trail by 1–08 to 0–07 at half time. Another Tyrone rally at the start of the second half put Tyrone on their way. Monaghan goaled in the 51st minute through Tommy Freeman and a succession of high balls on a beleaguered Tyrone defence saw Monaghan plunder the scores to leave just 3 points in it going into injury time. Monaghan had numerous chances to level the game but settled an injury time point from converted full back Vincent Corey whose switch from No. 3 to No 14 was the catalyst for the Farney fightback. However, Tyrone won by 2 points.

==== All-Ireland qualifiers ====
It was the qualifiers next, and Monaghan were drawn against Donegal in Healy Park in Omagh. They won against the National League Division One champions by 8 points in a game they controlled from start to finish. Performances by Dessie Mone, Eoin Lennon, Tommy Freeman and man of the match Vincent Corey were chief factors in a 2–12 to 1–07 win which saw the Donegal manager retire afterwards but in August 2007 it appeared as if he may rescind that decision according to newspaper reports.

==== All-Ireland quarter-final ====
The quarter final draws were made as Monaghan entered this arena for the first time since the qualifiers were started. They were drawn against Kerry and Croke Park was named as the venue as part of a triple header involving a minor hurling semi-final involving Tipperary and Kilkenny and a senior hurling semi-final involving Waterford and Limerick.

The game was fixed for 12 August 2007, almost 22 years to the day that Eamon Mc Eneaney scored the equalising point against the same team, now defending all-Ireland champions. Monaghan were outsiders against the Kingdom where the defending champions were odds on to stroll to a semi final against Dublin. Monaghan started with points from Rory Woods and Tommy Freeman. A 7th-minute penalty was awarded to Monaghan when Ciáran Hanratty was dragged down whilst bearing in on the Kerry goals. Tommy Freeman coolly stuck the ball away to give Monaghan a commanding lead in front of 80,000 spectators. However, Kerry fought back to parity at the interval on a 0–08 to 1–05 score.

In the second half, despite the concession of a slack goal Monaghan led by 2 points entering the final 8 minutes. However, a combination of panic and inexperience both on the field and on the line told as Kerry fought back to level terms and go a point in front with a minute left. Monaghan strived for an equalising point, but after a series of missed passes and poor luck, Kerry won 1-12 to Monaghan's 1-11.

Afterwards manager Séamus McEnaney vowed Monaghan would be back again in 2008. Kerry went back home to the south to prepare for a semi-final meeting with Dublin on 26 August which they duly won by 1–15 to 0–16 to qualify for the final against Munster rivals Cork. This turned out to be a complete mismatch as the Kingdom crushed a weak Rebel side without ever slipping into top gear.

The eventual champions were quoted many times in the immediate aftermath that their joust with Monaghan had brought them on in leaps and bounds and steeled them sufficiently for the tests against Dublin and Cork. Mc Eneaney, Mc Elkennon and Trappe decided to stay on board for 2008, and this was ratified by the county committee in September 2007. The only retiree was kit man Michael Mc Kenna, who stepped down for work reasons.

2008 finished with Monaghan being awarded 7 Irish News Ulster GAA all-stars, and Thomas Freeman at right corner forward earned a Vodafone All-star award. He was also chosen as the Irish News and Ulster GAA writers Ulster Gaelic football player of the year. In addition, manager Seamus Mc Eneaney picked up the Ulster GAA writers personality of the year award.

==== Under 21s ====
The under-21 side, also managed by the senior team management reached, the Ulster final following wins against Cavan and Fermanagh respectively. They played Armagh in the final on 14 April but after a good showing lost out to a late Armagh resurgence on a 1–16 to 1–09 score.

=== 2010–2012 ===
Eamonn McEneaney managed Monaghan between 2010 and 2012.

=== 2013 Ulster Senior Football Championship ===
In the 2013 championship, Monaghan were handed a "favorable" draw. They were drawn against Antrim in the first round in Casement Park, Belfast. Monaghan had previously brushed aside the Antrim men in the National League. Monaghan started shakily and took a while to get going, but the free taking of Conor McManus powered them over the line 0–11 to 0–6.

In the Ulster semi-final Monaghan were pitted against local neighbours Cavan. The game was a tight affair with both teams trading scores. In the end it finished on a score of 1–11 to 0-13. Coming into the final Monaghan faced the reigning Ulster and All Ireland Champions, Donegal. They rushed into a 4–0 lead while also keeping Donegal scoreless for 32 minutes.

At half time Monaghan led 05–02. Despite the 3-point advantage Donegal were still fancied, but Kieran Hughes stuck over 3 quick points in succession to buffer the Farney Men's advantage. With Vinny Corey's rough housing of Michael Murphy, Donegal failed to get going. Monaghan beat Donegal at their own game using the blanket defence system, while Darren Hughes and Conor McManus performed well. It was tight up until the last 10 minutes when Monaghan added some scores to win, Tommy Freeman coming off the bench and firing over the last point. At the end of the game Monaghan had won their first Ulster Senior Football Championship in 25 years. This result was coupled with the Minors comeback win earlier in the day defeating Tyrone to complete an historic double. Owen Lennon lifted the Anglo Celt Cup as no Monaghan Captain had done for 25 years.

=== Current era ===
Monaghan qualified for a 2018 All-Ireland SFC semi-final, a first appearance at this stage of the competition since 1988. In the 2021 Ulster Senior Football Championship Monaghan reached the final losing to Tyrone by a single point.

McEnaney returned as manager before the 2020 season. He left at the end of the 2022 season.

Vinny Corey replaced McEnaney as manager. Corey stepped down in August 2024. Gabriel Bannigan replaced him.

== Panel ==
Team as per Monaghan vs Donegal in the 2025 All-Ireland Senior Football Championship Quarter-Final, 28 June 2025

No.	Player	Position	Club
1	Rory Beggan	Goalkeeper	Scotstown
2	Ryan Wylie	Right corner-back	Ballybay
3	Kieran Duffy	Full back	Latton
4	Dylan Byrne	Left corner back	Magheracloone
5	Ryan O'Toole	Right half-back	Scotstown
6	Dessie Ward	Centre back	Ballybay
7	Conor McCarthy	Left half-back	Scotstown
8	Micheál McCarville	Midfield	Scotstown
9	Gavin McPhillips	Midfield	Scotstown
10	Aaron Carey	Right half-forward	Clontibret
11	Micheál Bannigan (captain)	Centre forward	Aughnamullen
12	Ryan McAnespie	Left half-forward	Emyvale
13	Jack McCarron	Right corner-forward	Scotstown
14	Andrew Woods	Full forward	Inniskeen
15	Stephen O'Hanlon	Left corner-forward	Carrickmacross

No.	Player	Position	Club
16	Kian Mulligan	Substitute	Latton
17	Ronan Boyle	Substitute	Truagh
18	Louis Kelly	Substitute	Truagh
19	Darren Hughes	Substitute	Scotstown
20	Gary Mohan	Substitute	Truagh
21	Ciarán McNulty	Substitute	Inniskeen
22	Jason Irwin	Substitute	Oram
23	Killian Lavelle	Substitute	Clontibret
24	Stephen Mooney	Substitute	Cremartin
25	David Garland	Substitute	Donaghmoyne
26	Karl O'Connell	Substitute	Tyholland

== Management team ==
Ratified ahead of the 2025 season:

- Manager: Gabriel Bannigan
- Backroom: Andy Moran, John McElholm, Damien Freeman

== Managerial history ==
Dates	Name	Origin
c.1979–198..?	Seán McCague	Scotstown
19...–2004?	?	
2004–2010	Séamus McEnaney	Corduff
2010–2012	Eamonn McEneaney	Castleblayney
2012–2019	Malachy O'Rourke	FER
2019–2022	Séamus McEnaney (2)	Corduff
2022–2024	Vinny Corey	Clontibret
2024–	Gabriel Bannigan	Aughnamullen Sarsfields

== Players ==
=== Notable players ===
- Kieran Hughes

=== Records ===
- Conor McManus is the team's top scorer in National Football League history.

=== Player of the Year ===
Year	Winner	Club
2017	Kieran Hughes	Scotstown

== Competitive record ==
Monaghan's only National Football League title win is from 1984–85, with Seán McCague as manager. Below is the team that defeated Armagh in the final.

- 1 Paddy Linden
- 2 Gerry Hoey
- 3 Eugene Sherry
- 4 Brendan Murray
- 5 Bernie Murray
- 6 Declan Loughman
- 7 Ciarán Murray (c)
- 8 P. J. Finlay
- 9 Kevin Carragher
- 10 Ray McCarron
- 11 Michael O'Dowd
- 12 David Byrne
- 13 Eugene Hughes
- 14 Gerry McCarville
- 15 Eamonn McEneaney

Subs used: Stefan White for ?; Owen Hamilton for ?

== Honours ==
Official honours, with additions noted.

=== National ===
- All-Ireland Senior Football Championship
  - (silver) Runners-up (1): 1930
- National Football League
  - (gold) Winners (1): 1984–85
  - (silver) Runners-up (1): 1985–86
- National Football League Division 2
  - (gold) Winners (3): 2005, 2014, 2025
- National Football League Division 3
  - (gold) Winners (1): 2013
- All-Ireland Junior Football Championship
  - (gold) Winners (1): 1956
- All-Ireland Senior B Football Championship
  - (gold) Winners (1): 1998
- All-Ireland Vocational Schools Championship
  - (gold) Winners (2): 2001, 2009

=== Provincial ===
- Ulster Senior Football Championship
  - (gold) Winners (16): 1888, 1906, 1914, 1916, 1917, 1921, 1922, 1927, 1929, 1930, 1938, 1979, 1985, 1988, 2013, 2015
  - (silver) Runners-up (13): 1905, 1913, 1923, 1924, 1936, 1943, 1944, 1952, 2007, 2010, 2014, 2021, 2026
- Ulster Under-20 Football Championship
  - (gold) Winners (3): 1981, 1999, 2016
  - (silver) Runners-up (10): 1964, 1967, 1968, 1973, 1987, 1992, 2003, 2007, 2021, 2026
- Ulster Minor Football Championship
  - (gold) Winners (6): 1939, 1940, 1945, 2013, 2018, 2019
  - (silver) Runners-up (12): 1930, 1946, 1948, 1960, 1961, 1978, 1983, 2001, 2008, 2012, 2020, 2023

Dr McKenna Cup

  - (gold) Winners (15): 1927, 1928, 1932, 1934, 1935, 1937, 1948, 1952, 1976, 1979, 1980, 1983, 1995, 2003, 2022
- Dr Lagan Cup
  - (gold) Winners (1): 1951
