= Laois GAA =

County board of the Gaelic Athletic Association in Ireland

- Nickname(s): The O'Moore County
- Province: Leinster
- Dominant sport: Dual county
- Ground(s): O'Moore Park, Portlaoise
- County colours: Blue White

County teams
- NFL: Division 4
- NHL: Division 1B
- Football Championship: Tailteann Cup
- Hurling Championship: Joe McDonagh Cup
- Camogie: Jack McGrath Cup

The Laois County Board of the Gaelic Athletic Association (GAA) (Irish: Cumann Luthchleas Gael Coiste Laois) or Laois GAA is one of the 32 county boards of the GAA in Ireland, and is responsible for Gaelic games in County Laois. The county board is also responsible for the Laois county teams.

The county football team contested the second ever All-Ireland Senior Football Championship (SFC) final in 1889. In 1926, the county won the final of the first National Football League competition, defeating Dublin. 1936 brought the team's only other appearance in an All-Ireland SFC decider.

The county hurling team won an All-Ireland Senior Hurling Championship (SHC) in 1915.

== History ==
Laois is a dual county, and has a comparable record at both football and hurling. It is one of a select group of counties to have contested All-Ireland finals in both football and hurling. Laois is a six-time Leinster Senior Football Champion, and three-time Leinster Senior Hurling Champion.

In recent times Laois have been more successful footballers than hurlers. Laois minors have had considerable success over the past two decades, and the Laois senior footballers reached the Leinster final in 2003 (victorious), 2004, 2005 and 2018.

As of 2025, Laois hurlers compete in the Joe McDonagh Cup.

== Sponsorship ==
MW Hire sponsored Laois GAA for 14 years, while Laois Hire was announced as its new sponsor in a five-year deal from October 2022 onwards.

== Football ==
=== Clubs ===
The major local club competitions in Laois are the championships which are listed below.

In addition, all teams compete in the All-County Football League from Division 1 down to Division 7.

Laois Senior Football Championship

Laois Intermediate Football Championship

Laois Junior Football Championships

Laois Junior B Football Championship

Laois Junior C Football Championship

Laois Under 21 Football Championship

Laois Minor Football Championship

Portlaoise won All-Ireland Senior Club Football Championship in 1983.

=== County team ===
Laois contested the second ever All-Ireland Senior Football Championship (SFC) final in 1889. In 1926, the county won the final of the first National Football League competition, defeating Dublin. 1936 brought Laois's only other appearance in an All-Ireland SFC decider.

Laois defeated Monaghan by a point in the 1985–86 National Football League final. Liam Irwin and Colm Browne both won All Stars for their performances that year.

During the 1990s Laois had a number of successes at minor and under-21 level, including All-Ireland Minor Football Championships in 1996 and 1997. During the mid-2000s Laois football became a strong force at all age levels. Under former Kerry and Kildare manager Mick O'Dwyer, Laois finished as National Football League runner-up and Leinster Senior Football Championship winner in 2003. Laois would go on to contest the Leinster Senior Football Championship Final again in 2004 (lost after a replay) and 2005 (lost by one point). During the same period the minor county team won the All-Ireland Minor Football Championship again in 2003 and the Leinster Minor Football Championship in 2004, 2005 and 2007, while the under-21 county team won the Leinster Under-21 Football Championship in 2006 and 2007.

== Hurling ==
=== Clubs ===
The major local club hurling competitions in Laois are the championships which are listed below.

In addition, all teams compete in the All-County Hurling League from Division 1 down to Division 6.

Laois Senior Hurling Championship

Laois Senior B Hurling Championship

Laois Intermediate Hurling Championship

Laois Junior Hurling Championship

Laois Under 21 Hurling Championship

Laois Minor Hurling Championship

Laois Junior B Hurling Championship

Laois Junior C Hurling Championship

=== County team ===
Laois won one All-Ireland Senior Hurling Championship (SHC) title, in 1915, when the day was so wet the team reportedly played the second half in their overcoats. Laois has also won three All-Ireland Senior B Hurling Championship titles. The hurlers reached National Hurling League (NHL) semi-finals in 1981 and 1983. The team then lost the Centenary Cup hurling final to Cork in 1984. The hurlers were back in the NHL semi-final in 1996. Laois most recently contested the Leinster SHC final in 1985, with the result a defeat to Offaly. Laois won the Joe McDonagh Cup in 2019, and went on to shock Dublin in the preliminary quarter-final the next week to reach the All-Ireland SHC quarter-final. This was considered one of the greatest shocks in the history of the championship.

== Camogie ==
Under Camogie's National Development Plan 2010-2015, "Our Game, Our Passion", Carlow, Cavan, Laois, Louth and Roscommon were to get a total of 17 new clubs by 2015. The Harps won three consecutive All-Ireland Club JCC titles between 2006 and 2008.

Laois won the All-Ireland JCC's Nancy Murray Cup in 2007. The team won the third division of the National Camogie League in 2010. As of 2024, Laois were playing in the junior championship and the National Camogie League's Division 3. Noel Brennan managed the team in 2023. Pat Collier and Robert Jones succeeded him in 2024. Former Offaly hurler Barry Whelahan has coached the team.

The team won an under-16 B title in 2000.

== Ladies' football ==
Laois has a ladies' football team.

== Bibliography ==
- Fennelly, Teddy (1984). A Hundred Years Of The GAA In Laois.
- Phelan, John (2017). The Laois GAA Records Bible 1888–2016. Roscrea: Walsh Printers. ISBN 978-0-9556139-8-2
