= Mass rocks in Clontibret =

Secret Catholic altars in County Monaghan, Ireland

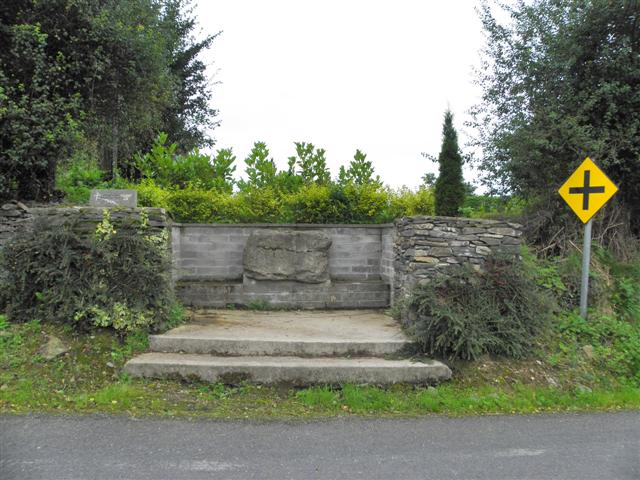
Lisglasson Mass Garden in County Monaghan

A number of Mass rocks and gardens were recorded in a survey carried out in 1957 in the Roman Catholic Diocese of Clogher in the Clontibret area of County Monaghan, Ireland. This survey was undertaken by Rev P O'Gallachair on behalf of the Clogher Diocese, a Roman Catholic diocese which spans the Republic of Ireland and Northern Ireland. The survey records three 'Mass rocks' and two 'Mass gardens'. During the time of the Penal Laws, Catholic religious observances were suppressed, and these remote sites were used as secret places of worship.

== Mass gardens ==
The 1950s survey records a Mass garden at Lisglasson in Clontibret, and a Mass garden (or hut) at Doohamlet.

The Mass garden at Lisglasson is situated close to the N2 and is accessible from the roadside. It is highlighted on the 1857 Ordnance Survey map of the Clontibret/Lisglasson area and in Ó Gallachair's 1957 journal article.

== Mass rocks ==
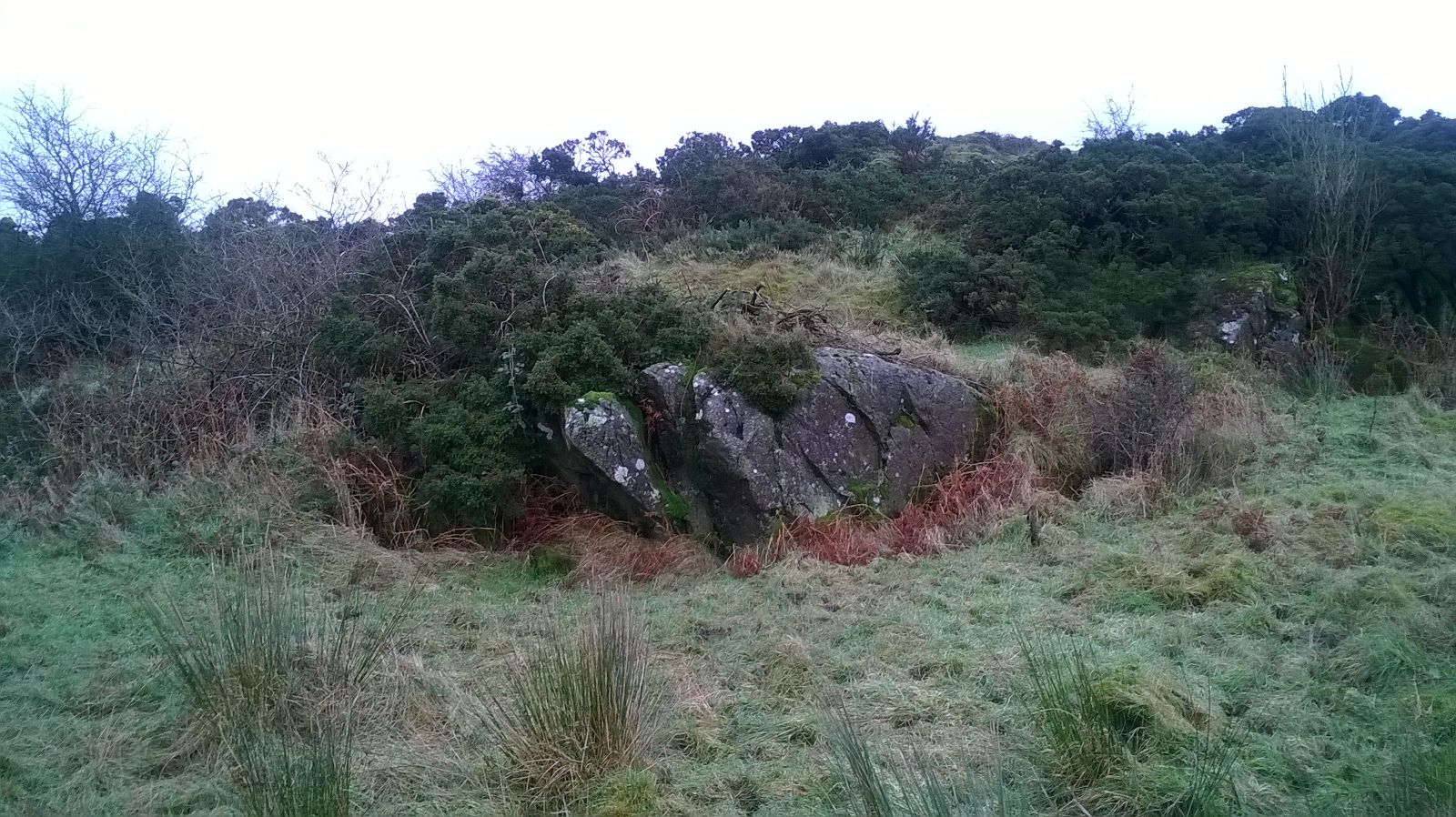
Lemgare Mass Rock

The 1950s survey records Mass rocks at Lemgare and at Tasson, with a rock or hut at Dunfelimy near Annyalla.

O'Gallachair's survey records Dunfelimy as being a Mass rock "on the site of old church of Annyalla". In making this reference, O'Gallachair is picking up a point made over thirty years earlier by Fr James E McKenna in his Parishes of Clogher, Vol. I (Enniskillen, 1920, p. 527). The opinion is that there may be a mix up between a Mass rock in Dunfelimy and perhaps a structure (usually a hut called a bothóg) which predated the old chapel at Annyalla and which was built in the late 1790s.

The site in Lemgare townland is adjacent to the neighboring townlands of Lisdrumgormley and Crossbane in County Armagh (Archdiocese of Armagh). Prior to the 1957 survey, the Lemgare and Tassan Mass rocks were also included in a report titled "Report on the State of Popery" (1731). This report identifies "Atlars ut supra" in the parish of Clontibret, with "ut supra" being Latin for "as stated above" where a prior entry reads "one Altar made of earth & stones uncovered". The entry also relates to multiple altars, these possibly being those located at Lemgare and Tassan. Lemgare Mass Rock is listed under entry "MO015-008----" in the Record of Monuments and Places.
