= Annaglogh Lead Mines =

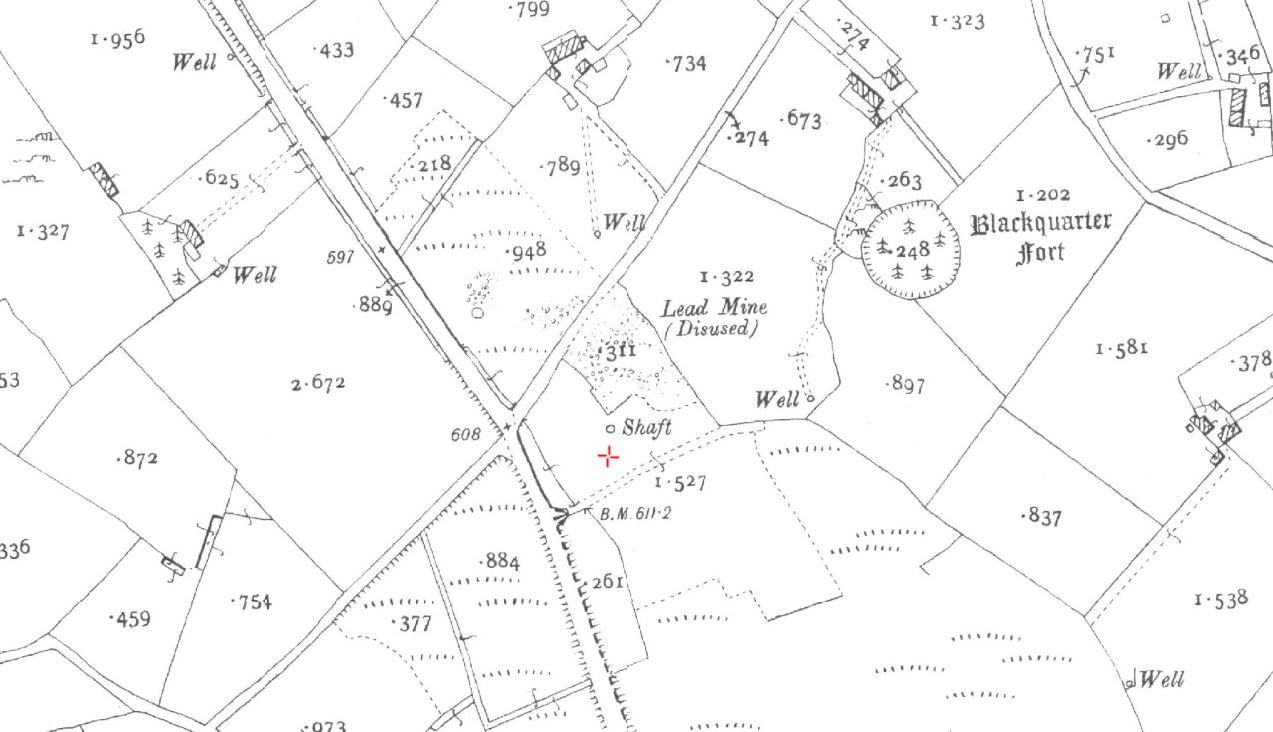
- Annaglogh Lead Mines on the OS map

- Location within Ireland
- Location: Clontibret, County Monaghan, Ireland; 54.187615°N 6.761702°W
- Products: lead
- Greatest depth: 240 feet (73 m)
- Opened: 1852
- Closed: 1867

Annaglogh was one of the larger lead mines in the Clontibret area of County Monaghan, Ireland. Annaglogh Mine is shown on the 1856 2nd edition OS map.

== History ==
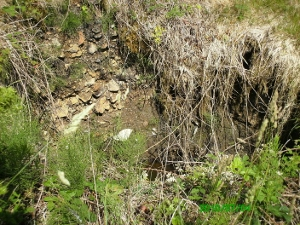
Collapsed shaft in July 2010

There is information on the mining activities in the area recorded in the Geological Survey Of Ireland Memoirs by FW Egan.

Production at Annaglogh is listed in Mineral Statistics from 1852 to 1855, though the mine continued to be listed up to 1865. There were four shafts and an engine house, which are shown on the 1870 GSI Map.

The remains of the mine's chimney and old spoil heaps are evident, however the residence of the mining agent was demolished in circa 2007 and (as of 2016) there was development of a new residence on the same site.

The operation was run by Captain James Skimming (1817-1880), who was also the Mining Agent for the North Eastern Mining Company of Ireland which also encompassed nearby Lisdrumgormley, Coolartragh (Bond Mine), Lemgare Mines, and Hope Mines near Castleblayney.

The North Eastern Mining Company of Ireland was formed on Monday 6 April 1846 at The Angel Hotel in Liverpool by way of a shareholders meeting. The entire working capital of the company was £8000.

Captain Skimming and the Cornish mining engineer George Henwood, were also said to be involved in a project in the West of Ireland called the Galway & Mayo United Mining Company in and around 1859-1860. They were said to have extensive mining licences in the area which amounted to 120 square miles.

Tasson Mine (1853-1867) was operated by under the direction of Captain Joseph Backhouse initially.

The Castleblayney Mining Company was the operator between (1862–65) and the mine was deemed to be closed by 1867.

Lisdrumgormley was recorded in 1922 as being under development by The Farney Development Company.

Captain Skimming resided in Annaglogh Castleblayney during his time in Ireland, and died here in 1880. He was predeceased by his wife Elizabeth who died in 1872.

== Individual mines ==
=== Coolartragh Mines ===
History: According to the GSI 6" Sheet and MSS notes, about seven shafts were opened on the vein that traverses the townland from south to north. Griffith (1861, p. 150) is the authority for identifying Coolartragh as also being known as the Bond Mine. The UK Department of Trade & Industry and the BGS .possesses a plan, and a section down to 35 fathoms, showing four levels, dated 1892 (AM 2986).

The Bond Mine operated by the Consolidated Mines of Bond, Lemgare and Lisdrumgormel (sic) Company of Liverpool under Captain John Skimming was reported in 1846 (Mining Journal) to have been developed at the 18, 25 and 30 fathom levels where the vein was large and productive with bunches of rich ore and that the vein had been explored for nearly "1 mile of length"

The engine shaft is said to have been vertical and cut the lode at 30 fathoms, and a large and valuable amount of ore is supposed to remain yet un-extracted. This lode is considered to be identical with the main Tassan Vein. It has an underlie to the east at 60o, and its course appears to have been proved beyond doubt both north and south of the main sinking. The matrix here is chiefly quartz, with some calcite; and a considerable quantity of sphalerite is said to occur along with the lead.

=== Tonagh Mine ===
Two small shafts were sunk close to the boundary of Coolartragh and Tonagh townlands. And some minor production ensued between 1859-61 when the vein showed a band of galena underlying to the east within a zone of brecciated slates above a footwall of Tertiary basalt. A landowner (Michael Hughes) proposed to dewater the shafts in Tonagh in 1953 but nothing came of this. No production is detailed.

=== Lemgare Mine ===
In the townland of Lemgare an adit and three shafts along a strike length of 50 fathoms (91 m) were sunk to a depth of 18 fathoms (33 m) below adit on a nearly vertical vein by the Consolidated Mines of Bond, Lemgare and Lisdrumgormel (sic) Company of Liverpool under Captain John Skimming commencing in July 1846. The vein is supposed to be the same as that at Annaglogh, located approximately 1 km to the SSE, which are marked on the MS. 6″ map of the Geological Survey. Griffith (1861, p. 150) gives Lemgare as a worked mine. Mem. 59, p. 28, regards it as on the continuation of the Annaglogh lode.

The Lemgare vein has been profitably worked at Annaglogh. It heads easterly at around 75o, and is joined from the north by another, also heading easterly at around 60o. A shaft at the junction reached rich ore at 17 fathoms (31 m). The lode is supposed to be thrown northwards by a cross-course about 1.2m wide which exists as indicated on the map, as all trace of it is lost farther to the east, it is believed to have been proved 150m farther north.

Lemgare Mine was re-opened by Billiton NV in the early 1950s as part of prospecting activities. The adit extended along an unmineralized fault zone for approximately 110m, being connected to surface by a short (4m) ventilation shaft near the portal. Upon entering sandstone wall-rocks the fault became mineralized and some stoping was seen to surface (20m) near the end of the drive which extended but was inaccessible but almost certainly extends below two surface shaft collapse located above. An inclined shaft or winze to indeterminate depth (presumably to 18 fathoms (33 m)) was also located along the course of the adit with a 10 cm rib of galena on the fault plane.

=== Annaglogh Mine ===
This mine is known to have been in production in 1852 and features in the list of mines between 1860-65 when it was being worked by the Consolidated Mines of Bond, Lemgare and Lisdrumgormel (sic) Company of Liverpool under Captain John Skimming. During this period approximately 300-400 tonnes of ore was reported as being raised annually. The 1870 MSS 6″ map of the Geological Survey gives details of four shafts one of which was sunk as much as 40 fathoms (73 m) on the vein, and a pumping engine house. The sites of several of these, along with the base of the engine house and its associated chimney are still visible. The only output from Annaglogh is recorded in 1852 when 310 tons of lead was produced and "some lead sold" in 1853.

=== Tassan Mine ===
This was probably the most important mine of the district. The townland adjoins that of Tonagh on the south, and the vein is the same as that which passes northward into Coolartragh. The mine was commenced in the late 1840s by Joseph Backhouse as the Tassan Mining Company 1844-56, but the most significant period of working was by the Castleblayney Mining Company from 1856–61 and from 1862-5; but it seems to have been closed in 1867. There are five shafts marked on the 1857 6" OSI map although little trace remains of them at the present time.

=== Lisdrumgormley Mine ===
The 6″ Geological Survey MSS map marks two veins continuing northward from those of Annaglogh, and the western of these was reached at no great depth in Lisdrumgormley, just east of a basaltic dyke that is probably correlated with this fault / vein. In the north of the townland, close against the Armagh border, "Lead Mine" is engraved on the 6" Ordnance sheet. Lisdrumgormley was also under exploration by the Farney Development Company in 1922.

The lode in Lisdrumgormley is reported, on contemporary authority, to be still rich in argentiferous galena, embedded in a matrix of quartz and carbonate of lime in the deepest workings. so far as it is known, from 2 to 9 feet. This lode, which comes to the surface at the main working, is said to have realized a large profit at depths not exceeding 25 fathoms. A shaft located some 250m SSE along strike of the vein is reported to have attained 60m depth and returned 50 tonnes of lead concentrates.

== Planning application (2016) ==
=== Report and hearing ===
EirGrid, a state-owned electric power transmission operator in Ireland, proposed a new electricity inter-connector between Counties Tyrone and Meath which crosses from Northern Ireland into the Republic of Ireland at Lemgare and runs through the townlands of Lisdrumgormley and Annaglogh - all of which had extensive mining operations in them.

On Day 34 of the Oral Hearing (13 May 2016) a report and research were presented to the hearing which was chaired by An Bord Pleanala inspectors.

=== Extent of mine workings ===
Because of a combination of the age of the mine workings for lead in this area coupled with the short-lived nature of the various formalised cost-book companies that operated the mines, the records of the extent of workings are obscure. Most of the cost-book companies were not floated on the London Stock Exchange as was common practice at this time and, as a result, did not return reports that were then published in the contemporary Mining Journal.

Dr Andrew claimed that in their assessment of the extent and impact of mine workings EirGrid had solely relied upon the information received from the GSI and EPA and did not appear to have conducted any detailed research. The GSI have admitted in correspondence concerning the extent of mine workings in the area that they “..do not necessarily capture the full extent of a feature, particularly if it is inaccessible and impractical..” and thus do not have information detailing the extent of mine workings such as shafts, trial pits, adits, stoped sections of veins and any lateral workings thereon.

=== EirGrid response to report ===
EirGrid stood by the accuracy and extent of the environmental impact statement and the basis on which they had carried out the research. They said none of the new information would change their assessment which had been done with the help of GSI information and LiDAR technology to provided details of the topography.

The assessment they had already made of the Lemgare area which showed the old mine workings extending away from the area where the pylons would be going. In their response document published in December 2015 the company noted that a number of submissions raised issues in respect of the potential of the proposed development to impact on specific mines.

=== Mine works collapses in area ===
There was extensive mining operations in the townlands of Coolartragh, Lemgare and Lisdrumgormley. In recent years there have been several instances whereby the shaft/tunnel networks of some of these disused mine locations have collapsed.

1. Whilst ongoing Quarry Operations were being carried out in Lemgare Quarry, uncharted underground mine shafts from that of Coolartragh Mines were uncovered in early 2000.
2. In 2010 in Annaglogh on the property of Philip McAdam there was an instance where 2 mine shafts collapsed and these were subsequently back-filled and made safe by the Department of Communications, Energy and Natural Resources. The actual works were carried out by the OPW (Office of Public Works). prior to this one of the same shafts collapsed in the late 1960s and was filled in by Monaghan County Council.
3. In 2012 on the site of the disused Lisdrumgormley lead Mine, within property of James Watters there was also a shaft collapse whereby the Office of Public Works also made the area safe.
4. There have been several instances where the shaft at the mine head location (as shown on the sketch in Annaglogh) where the actual Mine's Chimney was located has collapsed throughout the 1960s and 1970s, and each time the landowner, Patrick Morgan back-filled this himself as he was quite unaware of the role of the state in making sure these shafts were safe.

== Other information ==
James Skimming is mentioned in a number of articles including;

- Ireland's Recovery (1855) John Locke
- Mentioned as Mining Agent in the Nant-Y Car Mines in Wales under the ownership of BB Popplewell (1863-1872), then George (G.G,) & Mrs G Tetley (1872-1875) and finally C. W. Seccombe (1878-1893) when it was eventually wound up in 1893. GG Tetley (1805 - 1873) a Bradford merchant, was the Chairman and single largest shareholder of the Tasson Mine (3,000 shares out of a total of 19,856 issued).
- Extracts from the report of GL Kroll (The Pb Zn Deposits North of Castleblayney Ireland) & Mining Journal 9 April 1853 P.216
- Lemgare Mines- The British Newspaper Archive
