= Tassan Rovers GAA =

Monaghan-based Gaelic games club

Tassan Rovers
- An tEasán
- Founded: 1937
- County: Monaghan
- Colours: Red and White
- Grounds: The Boggan, Tassan
- Coordinates: 54°N 6°W

Playing kits
Standard colours

Tassan Rovers GAA (Irish: CLG An tEasán) was a Gaelic football team in Tassan, County Monaghan, Ireland. The Tassan team came together in early 1937 and participated in the Junior League Mid Monaghan section. The team was managed by Francis Brennan, John Mulligan, Peter Flanagan and Frank Murphy. Paddy Morgan, Lisdrumgormely was also associated with the team. The Tassan team wore red jerseys and trained and played football in a local meadow field known as the "Boggan".

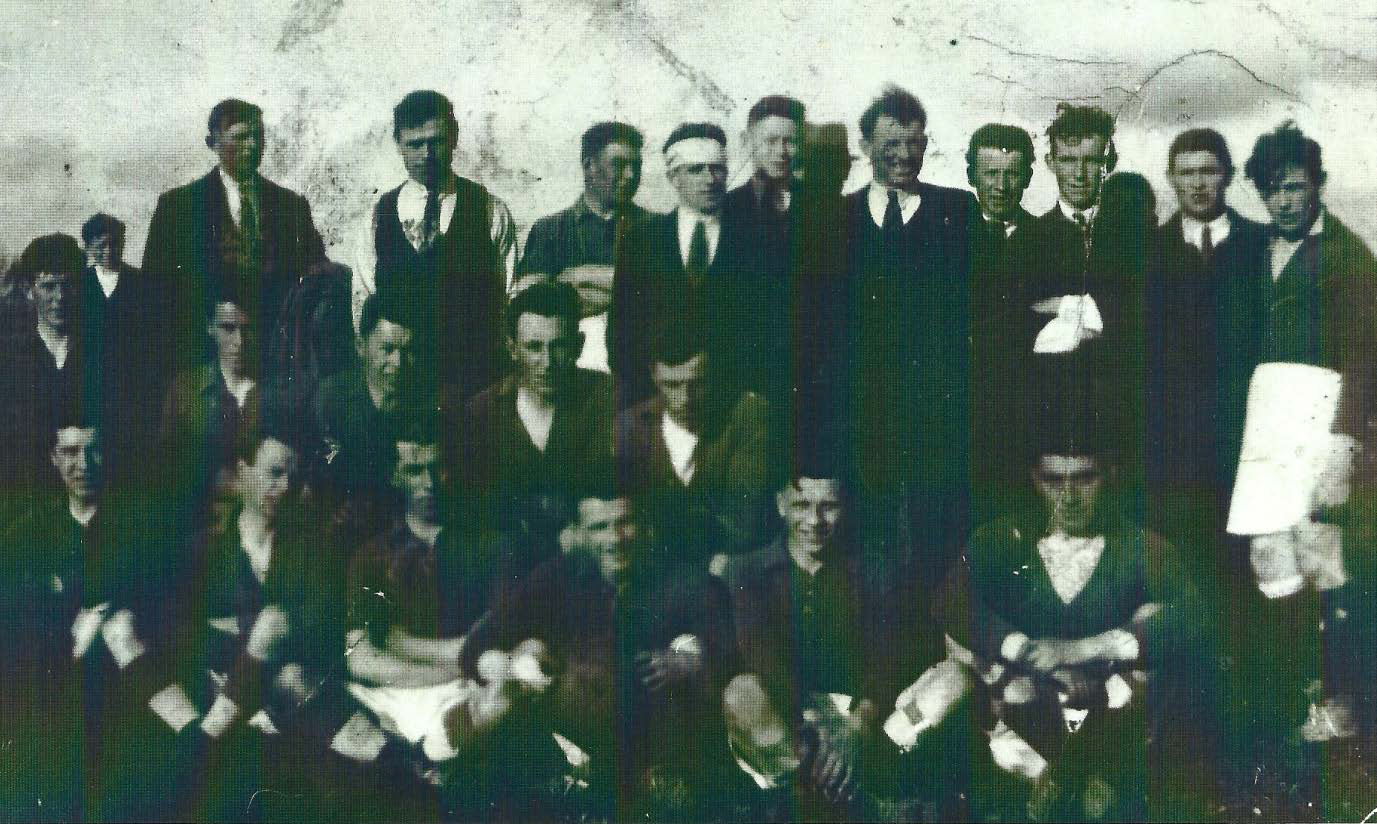
Back: (Left to Right:):"Wee" Peter Brennan (boy), Peter Flanagan, James Carroll (waist coat), Owen Conlan, William Mc Cahey (Headband), Dinny Brennan, Francis Brennan (shadow and hat), Eddie Sweeney, Frank Murphy, Packie Brennan, Paddy Mc Nally, Seamus ClerkinMiddle Row: (Left to Right):Eddie Donnelly, Packie Sweeney, Pat Molloy, Paddy Mulligan, James Mc Ginn. Front Row: (Left to Right):Pat Mc Mahon, Seamus Mc Ginn, Peter Reneghan, Frank Flanagan, James Flanagan and Owen Woods.

== History ==
=== Foundation ===
The first reference to the newly formed Tassan team was recorded in a league table in the Northern Standard newspaper of 19 March 1937.

- Note: All references to The Northern Standard can only be physically viewed from the microfilm archives in the Clones Library, Clones, County Monaghan
- A locally compiled document titled A Brief History of Tassan Rovers GAA Team 1937 to 1941 serves as the source for the majority of facts found in this article.

=== Ballybay go under at Tassan ===
The first reported game and victory against Ballybay Pearse Brothers was reported in the Northern Standard on Friday 26 March 1937:

"Ballybay Juniors travelled over to Tassan, near the Armagh Border on Sunday evening last where they suffered a big defeat in a League fixture. The visitors opened well and starting off at a brisk pace opened the score from a penalty taken by Finnegan, and Wynne tipped over a point. Ballybay's big following sent their hats in the air over this sweeping bit of play. Tassan soon settled down, Maguire sending in a rasping shot that found the net. Several rushes by the home side were successfully warded off by Duffy and Dowd on the defence line and Ballybay was leading by a point at half time. On the change over Mulligan leveled the score and Wynne was again in the limelight for Pearse Bros. Excitement ran high when he put the town lads leading by a goal. Tassan's turn came when their sure shot Maguire drew even. Up to this the contest was an equal battle, but towards the close Tassan took over control and kept scoring at regular intervals. Final result Tassan 4 goals 5 points; Ballybay 2 goals 2 points. The forward line from the town was a weak combination that needs overhauling. The defence was praiseworthy, but it was impossible to hold those hefty gaels from the border. Mr. P. Duffy was an impartial referee."

=== Junior, Ballybay 2-1; Tassan 0-7 ===
The return game with Ballybay was recorded in the Northern Standard on 9 April 1937:

"Sunday last saw a great turnout of people to the Athletic grounds where the County Board had arranged a double fixture. The opening Junior tie was between Tassan and Ballybay. The town team playing with the wind were slow to settle down. For the first 15 minutes the exchanges were kept in mid-field, then John Wynne that clever forward, moved up and scored the first point. After this there was good tackling and the contest grew livelier. Several onsloughts by Tassan tested the Ballybay backs and the second score came to Tassan when in a melee round the Ballybay goals, Mc Elroy tipped over. The visitors kept pressing and added two further minors and the score at half time was Tassan 3 points; Ballybay 1 point. On the change over Ballybay got away, their forwards, Wynne, M. West and Linden, in good hand passing, netted a goal per West. On the kick out Leo Kearney rushed into the net from about 20 yards out. Tassan then pointed per F. Mulligan (2), Mc Elroy (2), and the full time result read: Ballybay Pearse Bros. 2 goals, 1 point; Tassan 7 points. Mr. Flanagan was an impartial referee."

=== Tassan 3-2; Latton 1-0 ===
The next game was covered on page 7 of the Northern Standard Friday 23 April 1937:

"Latton juniors made a rather poor display in their opening game of the season at home on Sunday against Tassan. They need a lot of training on the nice points of the game. Tassan, a new team, are a well selected team of promising youths, who bid fair to shed lustre on central Clontibret this season. Latton made a brilliant opening and were first to goal per Carragher, who with Mc Guinness and Mc Cabe made a strong trio. Wm Mc Caughey from a rasping shot replied for Tassan. When the visitors spread out they took possession, Maguire pointing and Mc Mahon goaling, put the issue beyond the region of doubt. Several tries by Latton saw the forwards finish weakly and the Clontibret team won easily on the score: - Tassan 3 goals, 2 points; Latton 1 goal. Mr. Sweeney made an admirable referee. Tassan were well served by J. Connor in goals, P. Brennan (capt.), Mulligan, Morgan, Maguire, Mullen (2), Woods, Mohan, McMahon, Cravens, M. Brennan."

=== Junior, Doohamlet 1-1; Tassan 0-4 ===
Recorded in the Northern Standard from Friday 14 May 1937:

"There was a stiff tussle for honours in the Junior game at Tassan on Sunday where Doohamlet travelled and was early to goal per M Cormack. Tassan made several drives to reply but O'Neill's concentrated on defence work and Mc Gahey's scores were restricted to minors. However, he tipped over three, but Keenan put his side ahead by a point and looked like winning when near the close Craven's drew level. Result - Doohamlet O'Neill's 1 goal, 1 point; Tassan 4 points."

=== Junior, Doohamlet 0-6; Tassan 1-0 ===
From an extract found on page 7 of the Northern Standard Friday 21, May 1937:

"Doohamlet O’Neills defeated the neighbouring team Tassan Rovers in the Junior fixture on the sheep walk last Sunday. Were it not for Beanie Keenan who got over 2 points in the opening half the contest was so even that it nearly ended scoreless. During the second moity Tassan goaled per Brennan and again pointing up frequently added 4 minors. Result: Doohamlet O’ Neill's 6 points, Tassan Rovers 1 goal."

=== Junior, Tassan 0-9; Latton 0-7 ===
Northern Standard extract Friday 28 May 1937 page 7:

"Those who followed the fortunes of the game are asking where is Tassan, as a noted combination of promising athletes have got going for there this season. Tassan is an historic townland in Clontibret, near Annyalla, where Archbishop Sylvester Mulligan was born. Latton went over there last Sunday for a junior league fixture and a fast game of points resulted. These minor scores came frequently throughout the hour as every inch of sod was contested and it was mere luck that give the same side victory on score : Tassan Rovers, 9 points; Latton O'Rahilly's, 7 points"

=== Promising progression in the division, 1937 ===
By 18 June 1937, Tassan had progressed to the top of the Mid - Monaghan Junior division with 9 points on the table, two points ahead of Doohamlet, three points ahead of Castleblayney and seven points ahead of Ballybay and Latton.

=== 1938 ===
1938 commenced with a pre-season friendly against Cremartin on 25 February, listed on the Tassan team were T. Moen (captain), H. McEnaney, B. Carragher, M. McCaffrey, C. Brennan, P. McAtavey, P. McKenna, J. McKenna, J. Spinks, P. Flanagan, J. Cunningham, F. O’Kane, M. Tomney, T. Morrow, E. Carr. Tassan were competing in the Junior League North.

=== Tassan opens their account, Tassan 3-11; TullyCorbett 1-3 ===
Page 7, Northern Standard extract Friday 8 April 1938:

"In the opening game of the Monaghan Junior League at Tassan (Clontibret) on Sunday, the home selection defeated Tullycorbett Sons of St. Patrick in a fast game. Mc Ginn and Traynor gave great service to the visitors, but Tassan are a promising lot who play the game. Result – Tassan, 3 goals, 1 point; Tullycorbett, 1 goal, 3 points."

=== Return game, Tassan 3-4; TullyCorbett 0-2 ===
Northern Standard extract Friday 15 April 1938, page 7:

In the return game held on Sunday 10 April 1938 "Tullycorbett Sons of St. Patrick at home on Sunday were off form for the Junior League contest and went down hopelessly before Tassan on a score of – Tassan, 3 goals, 4 points; Tullycorbett, 2 points."

=== Tassan in scoring form, Tassan, 2-14: Truagh, 0-4 ===
Northern Standard extract Friday 6 May 1938:

"One sharp shooter on the Tassan side, a promising Maguire athlete tipped over no fewer than 14 points in the Junior League game at home on Sunday against Truagh. Another colleague sent in 2 goals and in this rain of fire Truagh got 4 points. It was an awful hour of scores, Tassan 20 points and Truagh 4 points. These Tassan juniors will take a good deal of the lead in this year's championship. From near the Armagh Border in central Clontibret they are all athletes of much promise."

=== Clontibret contest, Tassan 3-3; Cremartin 1-7 ===
Northern Standard extract Friday 13 May 1938: "Those expert Clontibret Juniors from Cremartin and Tassan had a big battle for honours in the Junior League at Tassan on Sunday. Both sides fought strenuously, strong tackling and dashing tactics being special features of the contest. Atkinson and Flanagan showed up well for Cremartin, but there is no stopping of the Tassan lads, especially Maguire. Result – Tassan, 3 goals, 3 points; Cremartin 1 goal, 7 points."

=== Game at Cremartin, Cremartin 1-3; Tassan 0-3 ===
Northern Standard extract Friday 20 May 1938:

"Cremartin Shamrocks gained a victory over their neighbours, Tassan in the Junior League on Sunday last, when, despite the unfavourable weather conditions a large and enthusiastic crowd lined the Cremartin pitch. It was the only fixture of note in central Monaghan last Sunday and as both sides have won honours on the field many who followed the fortunes of the game were anxious to see them play. The Shamrocks were a little lucky to get a great goal win, but they adapted themselves better to the prevailing local conditions and made good ground work. Maguire was prominent for the visitors, and Atkinson got into his usual stride near the close to win for the home team. The score was : Cremartin 1 goal, 3 points, Tassan 3 points."

=== Division progress 1938 ===
Both Tassan and Cremartin were equal at 10 points on the Junior League North on 20 May 1938, followed by Tullycorbett at 2 points and Truagh with no points.

=== Outbreak of war in Europe ===
In 1939, at the start of the Second World War, the main industry in Ireland was agriculture and many small farms in Tassan produced flax, potatoes, corn, vegetables and had an abundance of bog which provided fuel to neighboring areas. The closeness of the border with Armagh also provided an opportunity to make an income from smuggling goods and supplies which were scarce on either side, this was always risky but the challenge of evading the Customs and making a few bob was attractive and fostered a sense of close community spirit and resilience during difficult times. The outbreak of war disrupted the fixture list for football games, rationing of fuel made it difficult for players to get to games, scarcity of the day to day items lead to rationing of tea, sugar and other goods, the reporting on games was also impacted by a shortage of paper. Ireland remained neutral during the war and a state of emergency was declared in 1939, which included censorship of the press and correspondence. The local paper focused on events in Europe and on National issues with little emphasis being placed on sporting activities.

- Northern Standard extract Friday 17 March 1939. Junior Competition : Oram V Tassan on 19 March, Referee Mr E.Sweeney
- Northern Standard extract Friday 28 April 1939. Junior Competition : Tassan V Carrickatee at Tassan, Referee Mr P. Mc Cluskey
- Northern Standard extract Friday 27 October 1939. Junior Competition : Tassan V Blackhill on 12 November 1939.

Because of the outbreak of war the 1939 Junior football competitions were not completed until 1940. Tassan played Cremartin in the 1939, Dr. Ward Cup Semi-Final in their new pitch located in Annyalla at the end of March 1940. The final score, on 31 March 1940, was Tassan 1 – 3, Cremartin 0 – 3, with Tassan progressing to the Dr. Ward Cup Final.

=== GAA Ward Cup Final, Killany 1-3; Tassan 1-3 ===
Northern Standard extract Friday 12 April 1940:

Report on the 1939 Dr. Ward Cup Final drawn game held between Tassan and Killanny in Castleblayney on Sunday 7 April 1940. "It was probably due to the Second World War and the restriction censorship requirement for secrecy, that the names of players were omitted from the Northern Standard reports of the Dr. Ward Cup final."

"Killanny and Tassan played a drawn game in the Junior Ward Cup final at Castleblayney on Sunday. It was a thrilling game; Killanny having much the better of the play in the first half. Both teams, however, played good football, Tassan in the second half showing up well, and a draw was a fitting result. Killanny had the advantage of a strong breeze in the first half, and after a few minutes play had two points to their credit. The tackling was keen but clean and Killanny would have had many scores but for good and keen play on the part of Tassan fulls. Killanny succeeded in scoring a goal just before the half time whistle, but Tassan who had many chances failed to register a score. With the advantage of the breeze in the second half Tassan attacked strongly and after ten minutes play raised the white flag and followed this up with a further minor. Killanny were not to be denied and worked back to the other end where they sent over for a point to again take the lead. Tassan now fought keenly and missed several easy chances of scoring. Maintaining the attack, Tassan stormed the sticks but after being beaten off several times they returned to score the equalizer just before the final whistle went; leaving score;- KILLANNY, 1-3; TASSAN, 1-3. It was a well contested game and the re-play will be eagerly looked forward to. Mr. Duffy, Ballybay, refereed."

=== GAA Ward Cup Final replay, Killany 0-2; Tassan 1-1 ===
Northern Standard extract Friday 26 April 1940:

The 1939 Dr. Ward Cup Final re-play between Tassan and Killanny was held in Castleblayney on Sunday 21 April 1940.

"TASSAN’S TRIUMPH" "There were two finals played in Castleblayney on Sunday – the re-play of the Dr. Ward Cup and the Minor final. The latter game between Inniskeen and Castleblayney preceded the cup final. Blayney won the minor final by five points. Towards the end of the Minor game rain commenced to fall, and continued heavily throughout the cup game. It proved to be a great game not withstanding the heavy rain, and although most of the spectators were drenched to the skin they remained on the side line to the end. Only a fortnight previously the teams treated the spectators, at the same venue, to a thrilling game which ended in a draw. The replay was eagerly looked forward to, and once again the spectators were treated to a great game, marred only by the rain and slippery pitch. Killanny won the toss and had the advantage of a slight breeze. Both teams were playing well having regard to the conditions and the ball was flicked from end to end at a very fast pace. The Tassan back line was exceptionally good, and many attempts on the Killanny forwards to get through failed. After a spirited attack Tassan sent through for goal and then followed a point. Killanny worked down and had two points from close frees. Then followed splendid play in kicking, passing and catching. The tackling was keen but clean, and on the whole the football was of a high standard. There were no further scores in this half. Half time score;- TASSAN 1 GOAL, 1 POINT; KILLANNY 2 POINTS.

On resumption Killanny attacked vigorously, and the Tassan goalie brought off a great save. Tassan were next attacking but a wide resulted. Up and down play followed for a considerable time, and it was surprising the high standard of football served up having regard to the conditions prevailing. Time and again Tassan back line held up the Killanny onslaughts, and returned the ball to the other end. Back came Killanny but still they could not get through and as the ball each time was flicked out of the Tassan goal mouth loud applause was heard from the Tassan supporters. Time was now running short, and Tassan put the game beyond all doubt by sending through a rasper to the net. Killanny were not discouraged, and in a lightning raid looked like getting through but the Tassan goalie brought off a great save. Renewing the attack Killanny had a point just before the final whistle went, leaving the score; TASSAN 2 GOALS, 1 POINT; KILLANNY 3 POINTS. Mr. T Bradley, Castleblayney refereed both games.

Following the Tassan team's victory over Killanny there were great celebrations locally in Tassan when bonfires were lit at road junctions and the victory was celebrated in Peter Flanagan's barn. A victory dance was arranged for St. Mary's hall where there was a large attendance of support from all areas of the parish. The Dr. Ward Cup final triumph by Tassan was the pinnacle of the team's success and instilled a sense of pride and achievement locally during the dark years of World War II.

- Northern Standard extract Friday 24 May 1940 page 6. Fixtures Tassan versus Ballybay on 26 May 1940.
- Northern Standard extract Friday 7 June 1940 page 4. Fixtures Tassan versus Latton
- Northern Standard extract Friday 25 October 1940 page 5.Fixtures Tassan versus Ballybay on 10 Nov 1940.

=== 1941 ===
Fixtures during 1941 included:

- Northern Standard extract Friday 11 April 1941. Fixtures Blackhill versus Tassan on 27 April 1941 Referee Mr. C. Fisher. Tassan versus Cremartin 4 May 1941 Referee Mr. C. Fisher.
- Northern Standard extract Friday 6 June 1941."ANNYALLA SPORTS : BIG EVENT FOR SUNDAY NEXT","The sports ground at Annyalla should attract a big crowd on Sunday next for the great evenings sport which is being provided there. The sports programme which will commence at 3pm is a varied and attractive one. An important GAA League match is down for decision between Tassan and the famed Donaghmoyne team"
- Northern Standard extract Friday 4 July 1941. Fixtures Tassan versus Castleblayney Junior League.
- Northern Standard extract Friday Sept 5th 1941. "Dr.Ward Cup Semi- Final 1940 Tassan v Clones at Tassan on September 14th 1941"

=== End of WWII ===
The Second World War had a major impact on the team's progress, Local Defence Force (LDF) groups were established to defend the country in the event of an invasion by the Germans. The scarcity of resources and rationing had taken its toll on the community and by 1943 the Tassan Rovers team was no longer functioning. With the ending of the war in 1945 the Clontibret O’ Neills team was re-formed.

=== 1977 reunion ===
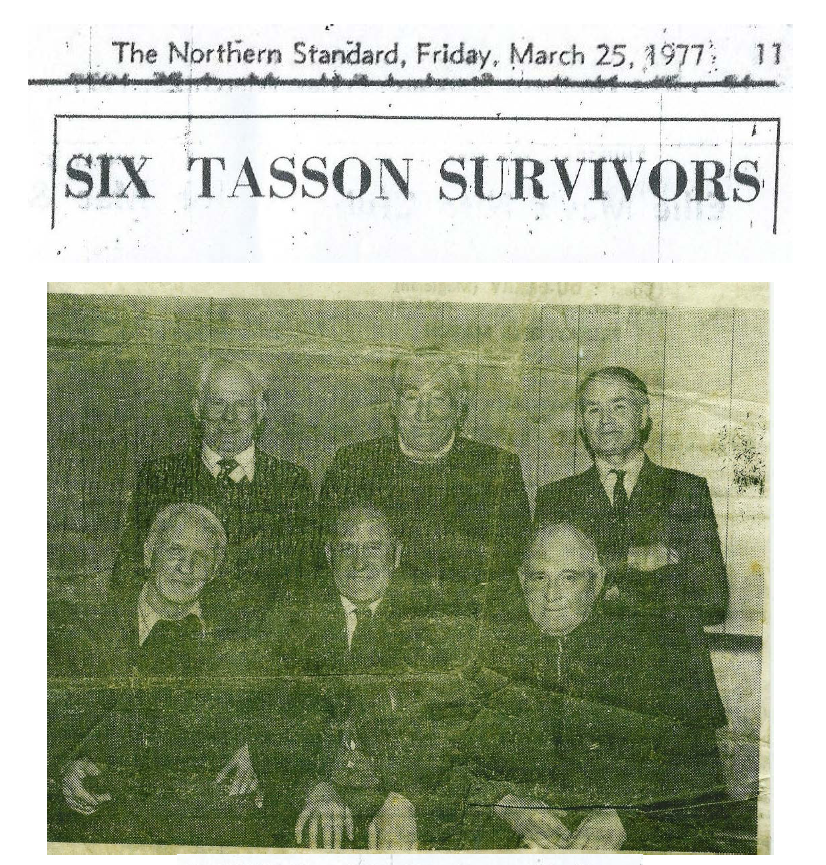
Picture by Boylan Studios shows six survivors of the Tassan team which won the 1939 Dr. Ward Cuo at a meeting in the Braeside Ballroom, Clontibret, on Monday night last to make arrangements for the belated presentations of the medals in the Braeside on Thursday, 28 April. They are: Back row Left to right: Eddie Donelly, Paddy Mulligan, Paddy McNally. Front row left to right: Jimmy Flanagan, Turlough Murray, Packie Brennan.

As the Tassan team had not received their medals for their success in winning the 1939 Ward Cup Final against Killanny on Sunday 21 April 1940, in Castleblayney a decision was taken in early 1977, that a reunion of the team should be organised almost 37 years later to acknowledge the achievement and present the winning medals. The Northern Standard of Friday 14 January 1977 showed the picture of the Tassan team at its formation in 1937 with names as follows Back: (Left to Right:):"Wee" Peter Brennan (boy), Peter Flanagan, James Carroll (waist coat), Owen Conlan, William Mc Cahey (Headband), Dinny Brennan, Francis Brennan (shadow and hat), Eddie Sweeney, Frank Murphy, Packie Brennan, Paddy Mc Nally, Seamus Clerkin. Middle Row: (Left to Right):Eddie Donnelly, Packie Sweeney, Pat Molloy, Paddy Mulligan, James Mc Ginn. Front Row: (Left to Right):Pat Mc Mahon, Seamus Mc Ginn, Peter Reneghan, Frank Flanagan, James Flanagan and Owen Woods.

Northern Standard extract Friday 14 January 1977. "A member of the 1939 team was County Selector and Army C.Q.M.S., Turlough Murray, who is now arranging a reunion of this victorious team. A meeting to make arrangements for a buffet dance was held in the Braeside on Monday night last and attended by many members of the old 1939 team. The function will be held at a date after the Ulster Convention in Enniskillen on March 5th. The new president of the Ulster Council will then be Con Shortt, N.T., who played on the Tassan team in 1939 and he will present the medals to the survivors of the 1939 outfit in the Braeside Ballroom."

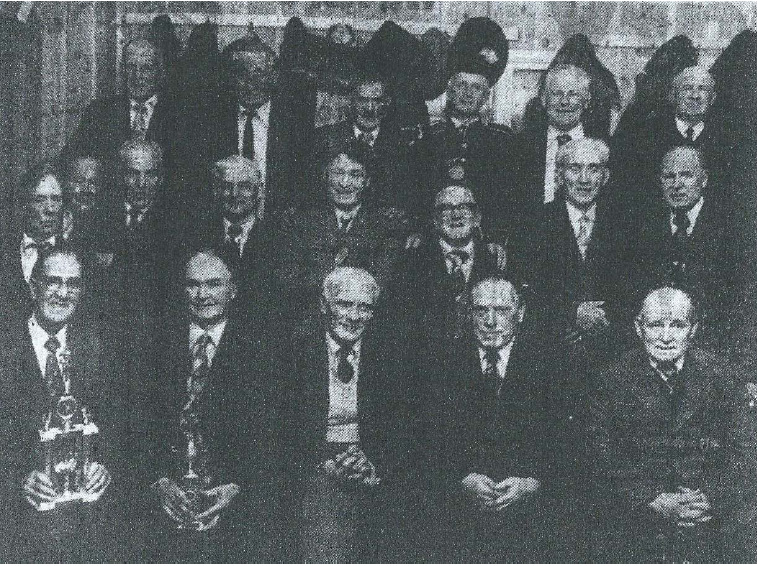
Pictured on Thursday night 28th April 1977 at a presentation in the Braeside Ballroom, Clontibret, County Monaghan are members of the Tassan Club who were presented with their medals and trophies for their victory in the 1939 Dr. Ward Inter-Club Football Competition.

Members of the organising committee for the presentation buffet are;- Turlough Murray, Pat Molloy, Owen Woods, Paddy Morgan, Eddie Donnelly, Packie Brennan, Joe Comiskey, Paddy Mc Nally, John Mone, James Carroll, James Flanagan and Paddy Mulligan. The presentation of medals took place on Thursday night 28 April 1977 in the Braeside Ballroom, Clontibret County Monaghan.

Northern Standard extract Friday May 6, 1977. "PRESENTATIONS GALORE AT TASSAN RE-UNION"

It was presentations galore in the Braeside Ballroom, Clontibret, on Thursday night last when members of the Tassan Team which won the Dr Ward Cup in 1939 were at last presented with their medals by Monaghan County Board G.A.A. It was also decided to present medals to all the Tassan players of that year and also plaques to committee members and a number of other people associated with this historic event. The medals were presented by the recently elected President of the Ulster Council G.A.A. Mr. Con Shortt N.T. a former Tassan player and also a recipient of a medal. Music for dancing was provided by the True Tones, Ballybay and selections were also given by the Lisnagrieve Pipe Band. A very capable Master of ceremonies was popular Ballybay schoolteacher Mr. Eamonn Fitzpatrick. One of the principal organisers of the function and another former Tassan player C.Q.M.S. Turlough Murray, Castleblayney Military Barracks welcomed Mr. And Mrs Shortt. Mr Peter Sherry, Chairman of Monaghan Co. Board and Mrs. Sherry. Mr Francie Mc Atavie, Secretary, Monaghan Co. Board and Mrs. Mc Actavie. He stated that there were apologies for inability to attend from Father Brendan Comiskey, Dublin and ex-secretary of the Tassan Club, Mr. Brian Brennan, Parliament Street, Kilkenny. The following were present to receive their medals; Frankie Mullen (Captain), James Carroll, Owenie Woods, Packie Brennan, Peter Brennan, Dinny Brennan, Eddie Donnelly, Paddy Donnelly, Paddy Mulligan, Willie Mc Cahey, Owen Morgan, Pat Hughes, Pat Molloy, James Mc Ginn, P Slevin, Paddy Mc Nally (owner of Braeside), Turlough Murray, Con Shortt, Paddy Morgan, Peter Craven, James Flanagan. Medals for deceased or absent members were accepted on behalf of the following; L. Reneghan, G. Reneghan, M. Reneghan, Paddy Bennett, P. Reneghan, J. Sherry, Pat O Brennan, John Treanor, Francie Flanagan, Gerry Connolly, Seamus Clerkin, Owen Conlon, Seamus Mc Ginn, P. Sweeney, Pat Mc Mahon, F. Mulligan, Joe Beatty, Francie Maguire, Packie ("Yankee") Mc Mahon, and Eugene Mullan. Mr. Fitzpatrick thanked Sean Mc Dermotts G.F.C. for having the Dr. Ward Cup on display to be presented to Frankie Mullen and he also welcomed the "Seans" representatives. In the 1939 final Tassan defeated Killanny and present at the function on behalf of the Killanny club were Mr. and Mrs. Patrick Dooley and Mr. and Mrs. Frank Thornton who were warmly welcomed by the MC. Mr. Fitzpatrick also thanked Mr. and Mrs. Mc Nally and staff of the Braeside, the Lisnagrieve Pipe Band; Mr. George Wallace and his catering staff; also the True Tones.

== Honours ==
- Dr Ward Cup
  - 1939
