= Lisdrumgormley Lead Mines =

Lead mine in County Monaghan, Ireland

- Location within island of Ireland
- Location: Clontibret, County Monaghan, Ireland; 54.197743°N 6.765101°W
- Products: lead
- Greatest depth: 50 metres (160 ft)
- Opened: 1846

The Lisdrumgormley Lead Mines are a deposit in Ireland that was mined for lead as early as the 1840s. The underground workings consisted of narrow, 1.5m-wide slopes above a northwest–southeast-trending level. It was the subject of further exploration during the mid-1950s when the original shaft was reopened to a depth of 21 meters.

== History ==
Initially Lisdrumgormley Mine was part of the North Eastern Mining Company of Ireland. It was formed on Monday 6 April 1846 at The Angel Hotel in Liverpool, with Capt James Skimming (Annaglogh) as its Agent.

The North Eastern Mining Company also encompassed nearby Annaglogh Mine, Coolartragh (Bond Mine) Lemgare Mines and Hope Mines near Castleblayney.

Lisdrumgormley was recorded in 1922 as being under development by The Farney Development Company.

Assays of over 22% Pb were recorded at the location by the Mining Corporation of Ireland in 1956. The access to the underground mine was by way of a shaft apparently almost 50m deep.

== Condition and shaft collapse ==
The plug of this shaft collapsed in 2012 revealing a cylindrical shaft, collared in stone, dipping steeply east. The shaft was subsequently back-filled and fenced by the Office of Public Works (OPW) on behalf of the Department of Communications, Energy and Natural Resources (DCENR) in 2012 at the landowner's request. Unfortunately, a horse from a neighbouring farm which had wandered into the property fell into the collapsed shaft and was lost.

== Remains ==
A largely overgrown waste dump and a disused outbuilding are the most obvious traces of mining on the site. A depression approximately 20 x 10 m in size adjacent to the waste heap may be a consequence of further subsidence above the underground workings. Mineralised material in the waste dumps consists of greywacke sandstone cut by thin dolomite veins containing galena as well as sandstone with quartz and carbonate, with or without galena or barite.

The only tangible mine feature that remains on the site is the waste dump. Boulders within this dump do provide evidence for the mineralisation but it was found that they were not particularly impressive examples and were insufficient to warrant County Geological Site (CGS) status for the site at that time.
