= Lemgare Lead Mines =

- Location within island of Ireland
- Location: Clontibret, County Monaghan, Ireland; 54.197743°N 6.765101°W
- Products: lead
- Greatest depth: 95 metres (312 ft)
- Opened: 1846

Lemgare Lead Mines is a mining company based in northeastern Ireland.

== History ==
Lemgare Lead Mines was formed on Monday 6 April 1846 at The Angel Hotel in Liverpool by way of a Shareholders meeting. The entire working capital of the company was £8,000 and the prospectus was outlined on that date also.

The operation was run by Captain James Skimming (1817–1880), who was also the Mining Agent for the North Eastern Mining Company of Ireland which, along with Lemgare, also encompassed nearby Lisdrumgormley, Coolartragh (Bond Mine) and Hope Mines near Castleblayney.

Lemgare Mines were recorded in a GSI report and are recognised as a geologically important site (CGS).

The mine features are not really preserved and are insufficiently interesting to require any designation for the site. However, the presence of rare wulfenite means Lemgare warrants CGS status.

== Dr Colin Andrew - Report / Information submitted to An Bord Pleanala (Oral Hearing) 13 May 2016 ==
In the townland of Lemgare an adit and three shafts along a strike length of 50 fathoms (91 m) were sunk to a depth of 18 fathoms (33 m) below adit on a nearly vertical vein by the Consolidated Mines of Bond, Lemgare and Lisdrumgormel (sic) Company of Liverpool under Captain John Skimming commencing in July 1846. The vein is supposed to be the same as that at Annaglogh, located approximately 1 km to the SSE, which are marked on the MS. 6″ map of the Geological Survey. Griffith (1861, p. 150) gives Lemgare as a worked mine. Mem. 59, p. 28, regards it as on the continuation of the Annaglogh lode.

The Lemgare vein has been profitably worked at Annaglogh. It heads easterly at around 75o, and is joined from the north by another, also heading easterly at around 60o. A shaft at the junction reached rich ore at 17 fathoms (31 m). The lode is supposed to be thrown northwards by a cross-course about 1.2m wide which exists as indicated on the map, as all trace of it is lost farther to the east, it is believed to have been proved 150m farther north.

Lemgare Mine was re-opened by Billiton NV in the early 1950s as part of prospecting activities. The adit extended along an unmineralized fault zone for approximately 110m, being connected to surface by a short (4m) ventilation shaft near the portal. Upon entering sandstone wall-rocks the fault became mineralized and some stoping was seen to surface (20m) near the end of the drive which extended but was inaccessible but almost certainly extends below two surface shaft collapse located above. An inclined shaft or winze to indeterminate depth (presumably to 18 fathoms (33 m)) was also located along the course of the adit with a 10 cm rib of galena on the fault plane.
