= Anglo-Irish Agreement =

1985 treaty between Ireland and the UK

- Signed: 15 November 1985
- Location: Hillsborough Castle, Northern Ireland
- Original signatories: Margaret Thatcher; Garret FitzGerald
- Parties: Republic of Ireland; United Kingdom
- Language: English

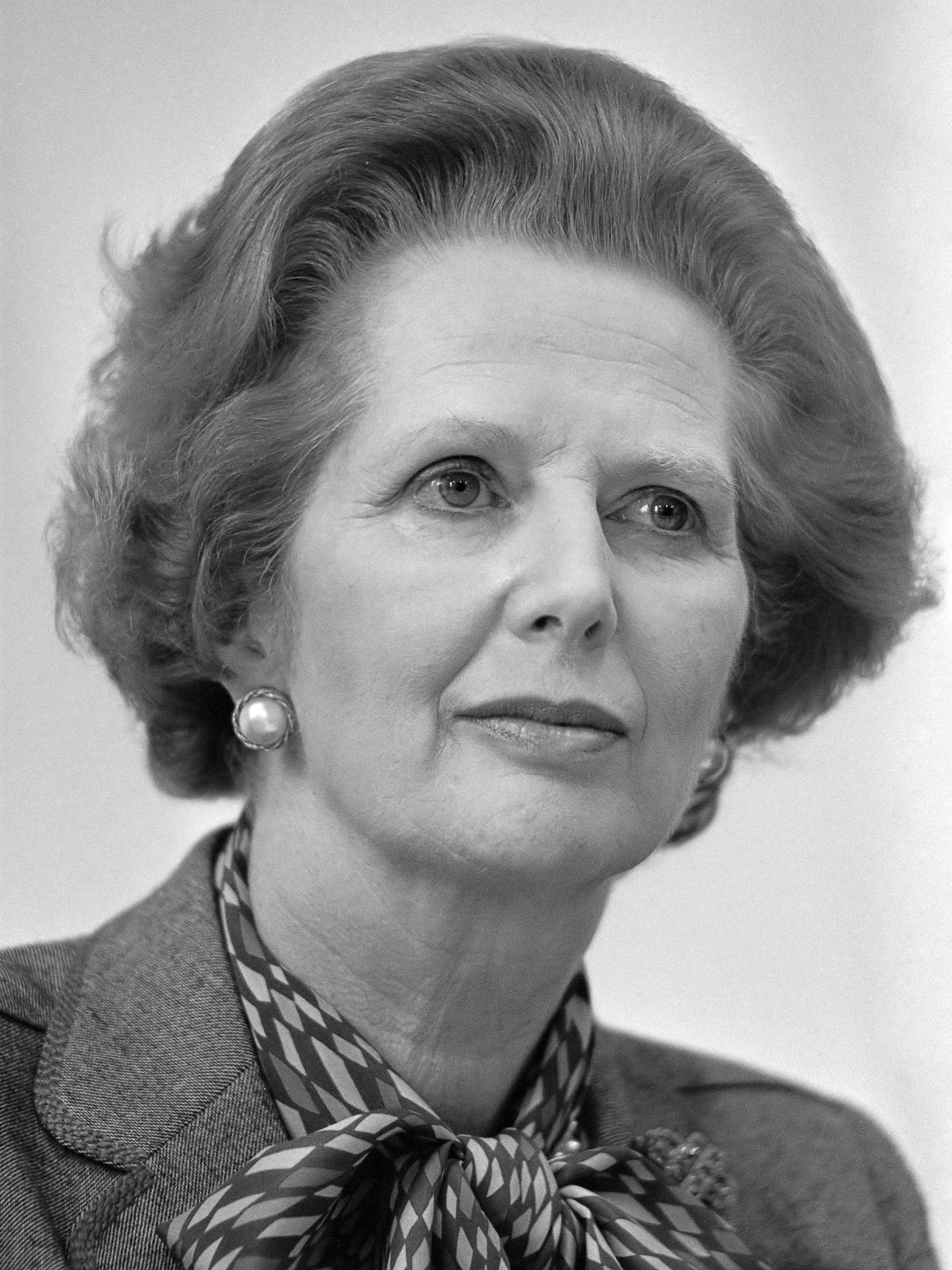
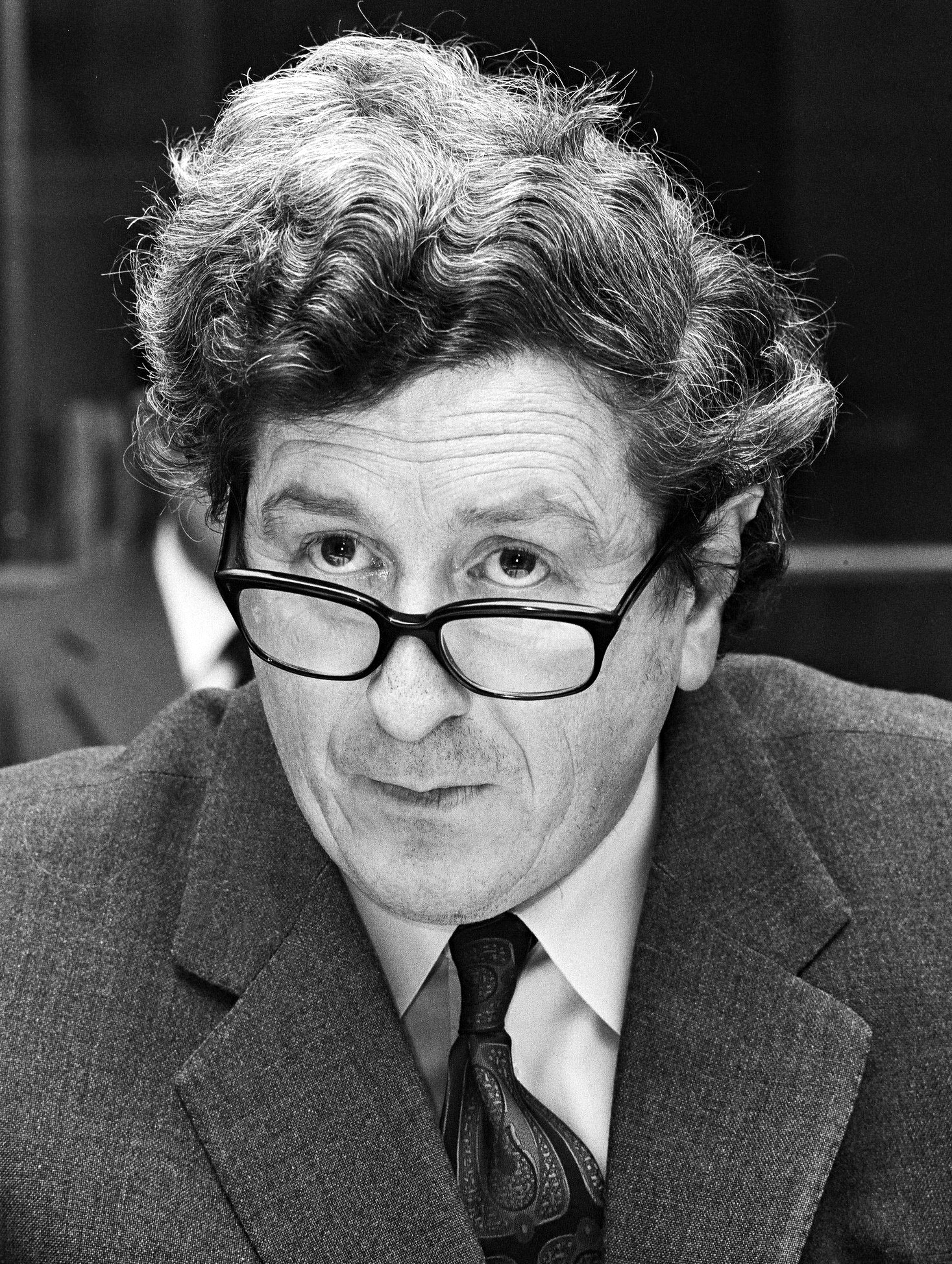
The Anglo-Irish Agreement was signed in 1985 at Hillsborough Castle by British prime minister Margaret Thatcher and Irish taoiseach Garret FitzGerald.

The Anglo-Irish Agreement was a 1985 treaty between the United Kingdom and the Republic of Ireland which aimed to help bring an end to the Troubles in Northern Ireland. The treaty gave the Irish government an advisory role in Northern Ireland's government while confirming that there would be no change in the constitutional position of Northern Ireland unless a majority of its citizens agreed to join the Republic. It also set out conditions for the establishment of a devolved consensus government in the region.

The Agreement was signed on 15 November 1985, at Hillsborough Castle, by British Prime Minister Margaret Thatcher and Irish Taoiseach (prime minister) Garret FitzGerald.

== Background ==
During her first term as prime minister, Thatcher had unsuccessful talks with Irish taoiseachs Jack Lynch and Charles Haughey on solving the conflict in Northern Ireland. In December 1980 Thatcher and Haughey met in Dublin, with the subsequent communiqué calling for joint studies of "possible new institutional links" between Britain, Northern Ireland, and the Republic of Ireland. Although this resulted in the founding of the Anglo-Irish Intergovernmental Council in 1981, Anglo-Irish relations had by this time deteriorated due to the Irish hunger strike and so this body was neglected. Haughey resumed power shortly afterwards and took Argentina's side during the Falklands War, leading to the meeting scheduled for July 1982 to be cancelled. However, the British Northern Irish Secretary, Jim Prior, proposed "rolling devolution": a step by step approach whereby local government was devolved to an assembly elected by proportional representation. This was boycotted by the nationalist community and the plan was dead by June 1983.

The Provisional Irish Republican Army's (IRA) campaign on the British mainland was ongoing, with the bombing of Chelsea Barracks in October 1981, the Hyde Park and Regent's Park bombings in July 1982 and the Harrods bombings in December 1983. Thatcher herself was the target in the Brighton hotel bombing of October 1984. British military intelligence informed Thatcher that she could not take the IRA head on and the likelihood of never-ending violence persuaded her to seek a political solution to the Troubles. The Anglo-Irish Agreement's origins lay in the behind-the-scenes negotiations between the British and Irish foreign offices, co-ordinated by the Cabinet Secretary, Robert Armstrong, and the secretary to the Irish government, Dermot Nally.

The New Ireland Forum had been founded (with the backing of then-Taoiseach Garret FitzGerald) in May 1983 by John Hume in an attempt to undercut support for the IRA by bringing together constitutional nationalist parties from both sides of the border. In June 1983 Thatcher and Fitzgerald met again and revived the Anglo-Irish Council, which met sixteen times between November 1983 and March 1985. The report of the New Ireland Forum was published in May and suggested three possible solutions: a federal united Ireland, a confederal united Ireland or joint sovereignty. Fitzgerald hoped that Thatcher might be persuaded of the third option but at the press conference after their meeting Thatcher publicly proclaimed that all three options were "out". Thatcher's intransigence persuaded the American President, Ronald Reagan, to intervene.

The most powerful pressure for the Agreement came from the United States, where the Irish-American lobby was second only to the Israel lobby in influence. Led by the Speaker of the House of Representatives, Tip O'Neill, and Senators Edward Kennedy and Daniel Moynihan, the Irish lobby regularly denounced what they considered British colonialism and human rights violations in Northern Ireland. Reagan, who was also Irish-American and visited Ireland in June 1984, increasingly encouraged Thatcher to make progress on Anglo-Irish talks. 45 Senators and Congressmen (including O'Neill, Kennedy and Moynihan) wrote to Reagan criticising Thatcher's rejection of the Forum's report. They also pushed him to pressure Thatcher into reconsidering her stance at the upcoming meeting at Camp David in December 1984. Reagan duly discussed Northern Ireland with Thatcher at their meeting, telling her that "making progress is important" and that "there is great Congressional interest in the matter", adding that O'Neill wanted her to be "reasonable and forthcoming". Afterwards, Reagan assured O'Neill that he had emphasised the need for progress.

Sean Donlon, the Secretary General of the Department of Foreign Affairs, later claimed that "the intervention by Reagan was vital, and it was made possible by Tip". Michael Lillis, the Deputy Secretary General of the Department of Foreign Affairs from 1983 to 1985, similarly claimed that "O'Neill was very active and effective in mobilizing the President. And there is no doubt whatsoever that Reagan's regular references to this in his interaction with Thatcher helped us in a major way".

By January 1985, Thatcher was persuaded that progress must be made on the issue. Her primary aim was security but realised that in order for help in this area she would need to concede in other areas, such as grievances over policing and the courts. She also hoped that this would help reconcile the Catholic population to the United Kingdom. She invited John Hume to Chequers on 16 January to discuss Northern Ireland. She now accepted that an "Irish dimension" was necessary in return for the Irish government's acceptance that Northern Ireland would remain a member of the United Kingdom so long as it had majority support. In April a four-member Cabinet committee had been informed of the negotiations; in October the entire Cabinet was informed. Thatcher and Fitzgerald met again in May at a European summit in which they discussed what became the Anglo-Irish Agreement.

== Provisions ==
=== Anglo-Irish Intergovernmental Conference ===
The agreement established the Anglo-Irish Intergovernmental Conference, made up of officials from the British and Irish governments. This body was concerned with political, legal and security matters in Northern Ireland, as well as "the promotion of cross-border co-operation". It had a consultative role only – no powers to make decisions or change laws were given to it. The Conference would only have power to make proposals "insofar as those matters are not the responsibility of a devolved administration in Northern Ireland". This provision was intended to encourage the unionists (who opposed Irish government involvement in Northern Ireland through the Conference) into power-sharing devolved government. The Maryfield Secretariat was the conference's permanent secretariat, including officials from Ireland's Department of Foreign Affairs, based in the Belfast suburb of Maryfield. The presence of civil servants from the Republic particularly incensed unionists. The Maryfield offices closed in December 1998 after the British–Irish Intergovernmental Conference superseded the Anglo-Irish Intergovernmental Conference.

=== Communiqué ===
In the communiqué accompanying the agreement, the UK agreed that all British Army patrols in Northern Ireland would have a civilian Royal Ulster Constabulary escort, save in the most exceptional circumstances. The Irish government made thousands of protests at violations of this undertaking by 1997.

== Reaction to the Agreement ==
=== Support ===
The British House of Commons voted for a motion to approve the Agreement by a majority of 426 (473 for and 47 against, the biggest majority during Thatcher's premiership). Most of the Conservative members voted for it, although there were some unionists in the party who opposed it, as well as some members of the Labour Party and the Liberal-SDP Alliance. Of the main parties in Northern Ireland, only the nationalist Social Democratic and Labour Party (SDLP) and the cross community Alliance Party supported the agreement, although the Alliance Party did not have any seats at Westminster.

The Agreement was approved by Dáil Éireann, by 88 votes to 75, and by Seanad Éireann by 37 votes to 16. The Irish nationalist Fianna Fáil, at the time the main opposition party in Ireland, also rejected the Agreement. The Fianna Fáil leader, Charles Haughey, claimed the Agreement was in conflict with Articles 2 and 3 of the Constitution of Ireland because it officially recognised British jurisdiction in Northern Ireland. It was also opposed by the Independent Republican TDs Neil Blaney and Tony Gregory, with Blaney describing the agreement as "a con job". Despite this opposition, all the other main parties in the Republic supported the Agreement, and it was ratified by the Oireachtas.

An opinion poll taken shortly after it was signed found that in the Republic 59% approved of the Agreement, 29% opposed it and 12% had no opinion. FitzGerald's government's approval ratings went up 10% to 34%; 32% approved of Haughey's opposition to the Agreement, with 56% opposed.

=== Unionist and Loyalist opposition ===
One of the posters used by the Ulster Says No campaign

The Agreement was widely rejected by unionists because it gave the Republic of Ireland government a role in the governance of Northern Ireland for the first time ever, and because they had been excluded from the agreement negotiations. The Ulster Unionist Party (UUP) and Democratic Unionist Party (DUP) led the campaign against the agreement, including mass rallies, strikes, civil disobedience and the mass resignation from the British House of Commons of all the unionist MPs. The DUP and UUP collectively organised 400,000 signatures in a petition against the Agreement. Northern Ireland Secretary Tom King was attacked by loyalists in Belfast on 20 November.

There was also a mass rally outside Belfast City Hall on 23 November 1985 against the Agreement, with Irish historian Jonathan Bardon saying of it: "Nothing like it had been seen since 1912". Estimates of the number of people there vary: The Irish Times claimed 35,000 people were present; the News of the World, The Sunday Times and the Sunday Express claimed 100,000; Arthur Aughey, a lecturer in politics at the University of Ulster, claimed over 200,000 people were there; and the organisers of the meeting said 500,000 attended. The DUP leader Ian Paisley addressed the crowd:

Where do the terrorists operate from? From the Irish Republic! That's where they come from! Where do the terrorists return to for sanctuary? To the Irish Republic! And yet Mrs Thatcher tells us that that Republic must have some say in our Province. We say never, never, never, never!

The day after the rally, a MORI opinion poll in Northern Ireland found that 75% of Protestant Unionists would vote 'No' if a referendum was held on the Agreement, with 65% of Catholic Nationalists saying they would vote 'Yes'.

Following the resignation of the unionist members of parliament, who represented 15 of the 17 Westminster seats in the province, the 1986 Northern Ireland by-elections were held on 23 January 1986, and all the resigning members except one were re-elected, standing on an anti-Agreement platform. The exception was Newry and Armagh, which in a close contest was gained by the pro-Agreement SDLP.

On 3 March 1986 there was a general strike, or 'Day of Action', in Northern Ireland, in opposition to the Anglo-Irish Agreement. There was widespread disruption as workplaces closed. Public transport including air travel was also affected. There was significant genuine Protestant support for the strike but there was also a high level of intimidation with masked Loyalists establishing barricades. In Portadown mobs attacked Catholic homes and a section of the motorway near Belfast way closed after nails and oil were strewn across the road. Vandalism and clashes with police broke out following a Unionist rally held at Belfast City Hall. There were riots in Loyalist areas during the evening and night and shots were fired at the Royal Ulster Constabulary (RUC). Later RUC figures stated that there had been 237 reported cases of intimidation, 57 people arrested, and 47 RUC officers injured. The British government and the security forces were later criticised for not keeping arterial routes open and for not trying to end the intimidation. Alliance Party politician Seamus Close, whose family had been a victim of intimidation, criticised UUP leader Jim Molyneaux for downplaying reports of intimidation. DUP Chief Whip Jim Allister denied roadside pickets which surrounded motorists amounted to intimidation.

The willingness of the RUC to police anti-Agreement protests shocked many staunch unionists and loyalists, who were enraged that the RUC was upholding a political decision at odds with the wishes of Northern Ireland's unionist majority. Despite intensely violent loyalist protests in the year following the signing of the Anglo-Irish Agreement the RUC held the line, at the cost of a sharp deterioration in relations with the unionist community. In 1986 there were over 500 attacks on the homes of RUC officers as well as intimidation of their families and 120 families were forced to move. That the RUC upheld the law rather than the interests of unionists did "a great deal to enhance the RUC's reputation for professionalism". Attacks on RUC officers' homes had already started in the summer of 1985 with unionist resentment exacerbated by the RUC rerouting Orange Order and other Protestant fraternal societies away from Catholic areas in 1985 and 1986. The parades were perceived as triumphalist by Catholic residents and often led to vandalism and violence. Ian Paisley declared that it was time for the RUC to declare whether it was for Northern Ireland or against it. Hardline unionists saw the RUC's willingness to defend Catholics as another sign that Protestants' position was eroding.

The UUP MP Enoch Powell asked Thatcher in the Commons the day before she signed the Agreement: "Does the Right Hon. Lady understand—if she does not yet understand she soon will—that the penalty for treachery is to fall into public contempt?" The UUP leader James Molyneaux spoke of "the stench of hypocrisy, deceit and treachery" and later said of "universal cold fury" at the Agreement such as he had not experienced in forty years of public life. Ian Paisley, a few days later to his congregation, compared Thatcher to "Jezebel who sought to destroy Israel in a day". He wrote to Thatcher: "Having failed to defeat the IRA you now have capitulated and are prepared to set in motion machinery which will achieve the IRA goal... a united Ireland. We now know that you have prepared Ulster Unionists for sacrifice on the altar of political expediency. They are to be the sacrificial lambs to appease the Dublin wolves". In his letter to FitzGerald, Paisley said: "You claim in your constitution jurisdiction over our territory, our homes, our persons and our families. You allow your territory to be used as a launching pad for murder gangs and as a sanctuary for them when they return soaked in our people's blood. You are a fellow traveller with the IRA and hope to ride on the back of their terrorism to your goal of a United Ireland. We reject your claims and will never submit to your authority. We will never bow to Dublin rule".

The moderator of the Presbyterian Church of Ireland, Robert Dickinson, wrote to Thatcher and said the Agreement was "the beginning of the process of edging Northern Ireland out of the United Kingdom – sovereignty has been impinged". Thatcher's close friend and former Parliamentary Private Secretary Ian Gow resigned from his Treasury post in protest at the Agreement.

UUP politicians Christopher and Michael McGimpsey even brought a suit against the Irish government in the High Court of Ireland, arguing that the Agreement was invalid because it contradicted Articles 2 and 3 of the Constitution of Ireland. (This argument was unusual coming from a unionist because of the traditional unionist opposition to these two articles.) The case failed in the High Court, and again on appeal to the Supreme Court.

Concerns of a Rhodesia-style unilateral declaration of independence (UDI) were raised repeatedly during several confidential Anglo-Irish meetings in 1986, according to Irish State papers declassified in 2016. Taoiseach Garret Fitzgerald believed that keeping the Northern Ireland Assembly running ran the risk of it being used to declare Northern Ireland independent from Britain. Some senior Unionist politicians were sympathetic to the idea and had grown closer to loyalist paramilitaries, including DUP deputy leader Peter Robinson and UUP MP Harold McCusker. Catholics feared they would be targeted by a Protestant backlash to the Agreement. Kenneth Bloomfield, then head of the Northern Ireland Civil Service, warned that "unionists are now beginning to realise that the choice facing them is whether to preserve the union or preserve their ascendancy" and "people going for ascendancy may find themselves, logically, on the independence road – however untenable that may be economically and politically." In 1986 Irish Independent Northern Editor John Devine wrote that a younger, more hardline generation of DUP politicians including Peter Robinson, Jim Allister, and Sammy Wilson would likely prefer an independent Northern Ireland to a situation where unionists were not in control or had to share power with nationalists. British civil service head Sir Robert Armstrong said that Unionist politicians had not considered the financial implications of an independent Northern Ireland, or how the move would be perceived internationally, especially in the context of the European Economic Community (EEC).

The Orange Order in Scotland claimed that one thousand people left the Conservative Party in protest against the Agreement. In 1990 Thatcher said that "The Anglo-Irish Agreement had alienated some pro-Ulster supporters in crucial constituencies" in Scotland.

In August 1986 DUP Deputy Leader Peter Robinson led a loyalist 'invasion' of the village of Clontibret in the Republic of Ireland, near the border. The loyalists vandalised many buildings and assaulted two police officers. Robinson was arrested, leading to rioting before and after his trial.

In November 1986 at an invitation-only ceremony at the Ulster Hall the DUP launched Ulster Resistance, a new paramilitary organisation intended to oppose the Anglo-Irish Agreement and fight Irish Republicanism. Ivan Foster claimed the group already had access to a significant arsenal of legally-owned firearms. In 1987 Ulster Resistance collaborated with the Ulster Volunteer Force (UVF), Red Hand Commando (RHC) and the Ulster Defence Association (UDA) to smuggle in a substantial quantity of arms including assault rifles and rocket launchers. The weapons jointly imported by Ulster Resistance and the two main Loyalist paramilitary organisations were linked to over 70 murders, including the Greysteel massacre and the Loughinisland massacre.

Thatcher was taken aback by the ferocity of the Unionist response and in her memoirs she said their reaction was "worse than anyone had predicted to me". She furthermore said that the Agreement was in the tradition of British governments refraining "from security policies that might alienate the Irish Government and Irish nationalist opinion in Ulster, in the hope of winning their support against the IRA". However, Thatcher perceived the results of this to be disappointing because "our concessions alienated the Unionists without gaining the level of security co-operation we had a right to expect. In the light of this experience it is surely time to consider an alternative approach". In 1998 Thatcher said she regretted signing the Agreement and said of Enoch Powell's opposition to the Agreement: "I now believe that his assessment was right".

Prominent Irish Labour Party member Mary Robinson, who subsequently became President of Ireland, resigned from the Irish Labour Party because she believed that the Agreement "could not achieve its objective of securing peace and stability within Northern Ireland... because... it would be unacceptable to all sections of Unionist opinion".

=== Republican opposition ===
The agreement was rejected by republicans because it confirmed Northern Ireland's status as a part of the UK. The Provisional Irish Republican Army (IRA) continued their violent campaign and did not endorse the agreement. Sinn Féin's president, Gerry Adams, denounced the Agreement: "... the formal recognition of the partition of Ireland... [is] a disaster for the nationalist cause... [it] far outweighs the powerless consultative role given to Dublin". On the other hand, the IRA and Sinn Féin said that the concessions made by Great Britain were the result of its armed campaign, from which the SDLP gained political credit. Brian Feeney of the SDLP has suggested the agreement hastened Sinn Féin's 1986 decision to abandon abstentionism from the Republic's Oireachtas.

Speaking in the House of Commons Jeremy Corbyn, MP for Islington North and later Labour leader, spoke to oppose the treaty saying that it ran counter to the goal of a United Ireland:

Does the hon. Gentleman accept that some of us oppose the agreement for reasons other than those that he has given? We believe that the agreement strengthens rather than weakens the border between the six and the 26 counties, and those of us who wish to see a United Ireland oppose the agreement for that reason.

He then went on to express concerns that the agreement threatened Irish neutrality and risked forcing the Republic of Ireland to accept the British presence in Northern Ireland. The former cabinet minister Tony Benn and Ken Livingstone, then leader of the Greater London Council, also opposed the agreement because they believed Britain should withdraw from Northern Ireland.

=== Northern Ireland by-elections ===
Maps of the result of the by-elections.

The by-elections called after the Unionist MPs resigned did not quite offer the electorate a clear-cut choice on the agreement due to the reluctance of the other parties to contest them. No unionist candidate opposed another, whilst both the SDLP and Sinn Féin only contested the four seats where at the previous election there had been a majority of votes cast for nationalist candidates. The SDLP rejected a Sinn Féin offer to form a nationalist electoral pact to oppose the unionist electoral pact. In the process the SDLP gained the Newry and Armagh seat. The Alliance formally committed to fighting all the seats on a platform of support for the Agreement, but some local branches declined to select candidates. The Workers' Party stood in a few seats. In four constituencies where no party would oppose the Unionist MP a man called Wesley Robert Williamson changed his name by deed poll to "Peter Barry" (the name of the Irish Foreign Minister) and stood on the label "For the Anglo-Irish Agreement" but did not campaign. Despite this he garnered nearly 7,000 votes and saved three deposits. The unionist parties between them garnered over 400,000 votes and over 71% of the total poll, but as no by-elections took place in the staunch nationalist seats of West Belfast and Foyle this latter figure is skewed.

== Long-term effects ==
The Agreement failed to bring an immediate end to political violence in Northern Ireland; neither did it reconcile the two communities. The devolved power-sharing government envisaged by the Agreement would not become a reality for many years, and then in quite a different form. However, it did improve co-operation between the British and Irish governments, which was key to the creation of the Good Friday Agreement thirteen years later. As such, it can be seen as a major stepping-stone in the peace process, of which the inter-governmental component was crucial.

At a strategic level, the agreement demonstrated that the British government recognised as legitimate the wishes of the Republic to have an interest in the affairs of Northern Ireland. It also demonstrated to unionists that they could not politically veto British policy regarding Northern Ireland via their presence in the House of Commons.

Irish Republicans were left in the position of rejecting the only piece of constitutional progress (in the eyes of many nationalists and republicans) since the failure of the first attempt at powersharing via the Sunningdale Agreement a little over a decade earlier. As such, the agreement boosted the political approach advocated by the SDLP and contributed to republican recognition, made explicit in the 1998 agreement, of the principle of consent as the basis of fundamental change of Northern Ireland's national status. Within ten years, however, the PIRA announced a (first) ceasefire, and both governments engaged in negotiation with the two sides to the Northern Ireland conflict, which led to the Good Friday Agreement.

The Anglo-Irish Agreement would also indirectly affect the outcome of the election of Charles Haughey as Taoiseach in the aftermath of the 1987 Irish General Election. Independent TD Tony Gregory abstained in the vote for Haughey seeing Haughey as the "lesser of two evils" due to Gregory's opposition to the Agreement along with his personal dislike for FitzGerald. Haughey was elected Taoiseach on the casting vote of the Ceann Comhairle.

== See also ==
- Other treaties involving Britain and Ireland:
  - Anglo-Irish Treaty (1921)
  - Sunningdale Agreement (1973)
  - Good Friday Agreement (1998)
  - St Andrews Agreement (2006)
- Ulster Says No – a protest campaign by unionists
- Unionism in Ireland – "Opposition to the Anglo-Irish Agreement"
