= Ulster Says No =

Unionist demonstration against Anglo-Irish Agreement

One of the posters used by the campaign.

Ulster Says No was the name and slogan of a unionist mass protest campaign against the provisions of the 1985 Anglo-Irish Agreement which gave the government of the Republic of Ireland an advisory role in the governance of Northern Ireland.

For British unionists (those who want Northern Ireland to remain part of the United Kingdom), this was seen as foreign interference in the internal affairs of the UK. For Irish nationalists, those provisions were seen as a start at fixing the democratic problem of lack of political representation of the large minority of Irish nationalists in Northern Ireland.

The Ulster Says No campaign was led by Democratic Unionist Party leader Ian Paisley.

After the signing of the Anglo-Irish Agreement by British prime minister Margaret Thatcher and Taoiseach Garret FitzGerald, unionist leaders stated that the agreement to allow the Republic's government its new role needed to be put before the Northern Ireland electorate in a referendum and organised a vote in the Northern Ireland Assembly to that effect. Irish republican party Sinn Féin also objected (albeit for different reasons). For similar reasons, in the Irish Parliament, the main opposition party Fianna Fáil also voted against.

A large rally protested the move at Belfast City Hall. The numbers attending were estimated to be at least 100,000 while unionist sources estimated over 200,000. In his address, Paisley famously stated:

Where do the terrorists operate from? From the Irish Republic!
Where do the terrorists return to for sanctuary? To the Irish Republic!

And yet Mrs Thatcher tells us that that Republic must have some say in our Province.

We say Never! Never! Never! Never!

Paisley and all the other unionist MPs resigned from the British House of Commons in protest, and all except Jim Nicholson were subsequently re-elected in the resultant by-elections.
