= Clontibret invasion =

Loyalist incursion into the Republic of Ireland in 1986

- Part of The Troubles
Date	7 August 1986
Location	Clontibret, County Monaghan, Republic of Ireland 54.20499°N 6.84100°W
Result	Loyalists returned over border; Peter Robinson arrested by Gardaí

Belligerents
Ulster loyalists	Garda Síochána

Strength
c. 150–500 loyalists. Some armed with cudgels.	5 Gardaí. Some armed with guns.

Casualties and losses
1 loyalist arrested	2 Gardaí injured and hospitalised

The Clontibret invasion was an incursion by Ulster loyalists into the small Monaghan village of Clontibret, in the Republic of Ireland, on 7 August 1986. After crossing the border the loyalists proceeded to vandalise many buildings in the village and attacked two police officers before being dispersed by the Garda Síochána. The incident occurred in the context of unionist opposition to the recently signed Anglo-Irish Agreement.

== Background ==
The invasion can be considered part of the campaign by unionists to undo the Anglo-Irish Agreement. The Agreement, signed by the British and Irish governments in November 1985, gave the Irish government an advisory role in Northern Ireland's government. This provision caused outrage amongst the Unionist community of Northern Ireland. Many felt it was a 'stepping stone' towards a united Ireland. They were determined to show their opposition and even reverse the Agreement. All Unionist MPs in the British House of Commons resigned their seats in protest. A petition against the agreement garnered over 400,000 signatures. A mass rally was held in protest outside Belfast City Hall. On 3 March 1986, a unionist 'Day of Action' shut down shops, offices and factories across Northern Ireland. The homes of members of the Royal Ulster Constabulary were petrol bombed.

== Incursion ==
Clontibret is about one mile from the border between Northern Ireland and the Republic of Ireland, in the Republic. The incursion took place on the night of 7 August 1986. The number of loyalists that took part is uncertain. Initial police reports stated that about 150 took part. This figure was repeated by some news reports on the incident. One news report stated a figure of about 200, apparently based on estimates made by locals. The figure of 500 is often stated in secondary sources, based on the estimate that Peter Robinson gave speaking to a radio station from custody. Robinson, deputy leader of the Democratic Unionist Party and a sitting MP, was the most prominent figure involved. The extent of his involvement in planning the raid and leading the mob is unclear, though the incident has become very much associated with him.

Many loyalists took cudgels with them. However, none are believed to have brought firearms. After reaching the village, the mob proceeded to damage property. They damaged cars, broke windows and lights and uprooted small trees. Anti-Agreement graffiti was sprayed throughout the village. Graffiti was sprayed on a wall which, unknown to the invaders, was the perimeter wall of a Protestant church. The iron gate of a school was ripped out and thrown onto the road. The village's unoccupied Garda station was attacked, with the Garda sign being stolen.

With many wearing paramilitary uniforms, the loyalists marched up and down the village's main street in a military fashion. Two unarmed Gardaí (Frank Gallagher and Jim Curran) arrived at this stage and were attacked by the mob. The Gardaí were beaten up, with both of them later being sent to hospital. Special Branch officers then arrived from Monaghan Town, armed with Uzi submachine guns. Warning shots were fired into the air, causing the mob to disperse. All of the invaders made it back over the border except Peter Robinson, who was arrested. Robinson later gave an interview to Downtown Radio asserting that he did not run away as he had not done anything wrong.

The Royal Ulster Constabulary (RUC) had tipped off the Gardaí about a possible incursion in the area, assistance welcomed by authorities south of the border.

Other loyalist shows of strength were planned for the same day. However, due to RUC activity, these were limited to the predominantly Catholic village of Swatragh in Northern Ireland, where a group of loyalists marched down the main street and caused property damage.

== Aftermath ==
Although the incident has gone down in history as being quite farcical, it was met with strong condemnation at the time. Government ministers from both the United Kingdom and Ireland condemned it. The leaders of the Alliance Party and the Social Democratic and Labour Party also condemned it. Ken Maginnis of the Ulster Unionist Party was also critical of the loyalists involved. Peter Robinson and the DUP justified the incursion by saying that it was done to highlight the lack of cross-border security, despite reform in this area being promised under the Agreement. They claimed that the takeover of Clontibret proved that no real reforms had taken place, and was thus a propaganda victory for opponents of the Agreement.

Peter Robinson was held in custody at Monaghan Garda Station for 32 hours, refusing all offers of meals from gardaí and only eating food his wife brought from across the border. Robinson was eventually charged under the Offences Against the State Act, granted bail after depositing a surety of IR£10,000 in cash and thereafter appeared in court in Dundalk in August. He pleaded guilty to unlawful assembly, and was fined IR£17,500. The alternative was a prison sentence, which would have resulted in Robinson losing his Westminster seat. He was forced to give up deputy leadership of the DUP but he was later reinstated. The court hearing triggered 'Belfast-style rioting' in Dundalk between local republicans and police. Cars belonging to Robinson's supporters were damaged and petrol bombs were thrown. Robinson's supporters had had any items that could be construed as offensive weapons taken from them by the Gardaí when they crossed the border into the Republic. Robinson and DUP leader Ian Paisley made a formal complaint about the 'totally inadequate protection' they were given during the hearing.

Ultimately, the incident and related efforts failed to derail the Anglo-Irish Agreement, which went through, despite continuing opposition from loyalists, including the founding of the paramilitary organization Ulster Resistance in November.

Speaking shortly before his death in January 2014, Ian Paisley claimed that the incursion had been planned by Robinson, who hoped for 'a tremendous uprising'. This renewed speculation that Robinson had really sought to increase his standing within the DUP, and become leader. Robinson rejected Paisley's account as a 'failure of recollection'. He claimed that Paisley was initially meant to go and that Robinson only stood in for him after Paisley had to go to a funeral in the United States. DUP sources speaking to the Belfast Telegraph backed Robinson's account, saying that Paisley was among the organisers. Robinson had in fact succeeded Paisley as leader of the DUP, a position he held from 2008-2015.
