= Tassan =

Tassan Tasson
- Townland
- Location in Ireland
- Coordinates: 54°11′10.03″N 6°47′33.2″W
- Country: Ireland
- Province: Ulster
- County: County Monaghan
- Time zone: UTC+0 (WET)
  - Summer (DST): UTC-1 (IST (WEST))

Tassan (Irish: An tEasán) is a townland in the parish of Clontibret in County Monaghan, Ireland.

== Geography ==
The townland of Tassan or Tasson is situated approximately two miles north east of Annyalla, close to the border with Northern Ireland, between the towns of Monaghan and Castleblayney, off the old N2 primary road, which linked Dublin and Derry. The area is located close to the Armagh border which provided an option for people to make a living during periods of economic recession also the Cashel and Tonagh bogs supplied a source of fuel to people for many years up to the late 1960s. Two lakes dominate the landscape in the townland, Lough Nahinch (The Island Lough) and Tassan Lough Natural Heritage Area, both of which have been used by anglers for pike and perch fishing over the centuries.

== History ==
Tassan is located in the postal district of Clontibret where in 1595 in the adjacent countryside the Battle of Clontibret occurred. The territory of Monaghan had been wrested from the control of the MacMahon clan in 1591, when the clan leader was executed by English authority. Subsequent encroachments by the English into the province of Ulster led to the Nine Years War (1595–1603). The battle was the earliest clash between the two sides, with the Irish led by Hugh O'Neill and the English by Sir Henry Bagenal. Although O'Neill won the battle, the war ended with the completion of the English conquest of Ireland. In 1610 the Plantation of Ulster was established, an event that still defines certain political allegiances in the north of Ireland.

=== Tassan Mining Company ===
The Tassan Mining Company was established in the late 1840s. Total production from the mine was reported at 742 tonnes of ore, including 546 tonnes of lead and 37.478g of silver. The mineralization was hosted by two lodes each striking Northwest and dipping Eastwards. The mine appears to have extended to a depth of 160 m below surface, the site contained a combined engine and crusher house as well as mine offices, workshops and at least five shafts. The lead mine continued in operation until 1865–1866, after which production statistics are unavailable. It provided much needed work locally in the aftermath of the Great Famine (1845–1849). The captains' mine offices remain standing, and the site is largely grassed over with spoil heaps visible near Tassan Lough Natural Heritage Area.

=== Tassan Rovers GAA team 1937 to 1941 ===
The Tassan G.A.A. team was founded at the beginning of 1937 and participated in the Junior League Mid Monaghan section. The Tassan team progressed to the top of their division in the Junior League by the end of June 1937. In 1939, the team won the Dr. Ward Cup Final re-play against Killanny, which was held in Castleblayney on Sunday 21 April 1940.

== People ==
- John Brennan, Fianna Fáil member of Seanad Éireann from 1960 until 1977 and a member of Monaghan County Council from 1942 until 1974, was also from Tassan.
- Brendan Comiskey, former Roman Catholic Bishop of Ferns, County Wexford, was born in Tassan on 13 August 1935. He was auxiliary Bishop of Dublin from 1980 until his appointment to Ferns in 1984. He resigned as Bishop of Ferns in 2002.
- Sylvester Mulligan, Roman Catholic Archbishop was born in Tassan on 12 March 1875 and was educated at the Capuchin College, Rochestown, County Cork, and at Louvain. In 1892 he entered the Capuchin Order and was ordained in 1901. He taught moral theology at Louvain and in 1925 was elected Minister Provincial of his order, a year later becoming Definitor General. In 1937 he was the last non-Indian to be appointed to Delhi-Simla as archbishop. For a period he was editor of the Father Mathew Record. He died on 23 October 1950 and is buried in the Capuchin plot in Glasnevin Cemetery, Dublin.

== See also ==
- List of towns and villages in Ireland
