= Annyalla =

Village in County Monaghan, Ireland

Annyalla Eanaigh Gheala
- Village
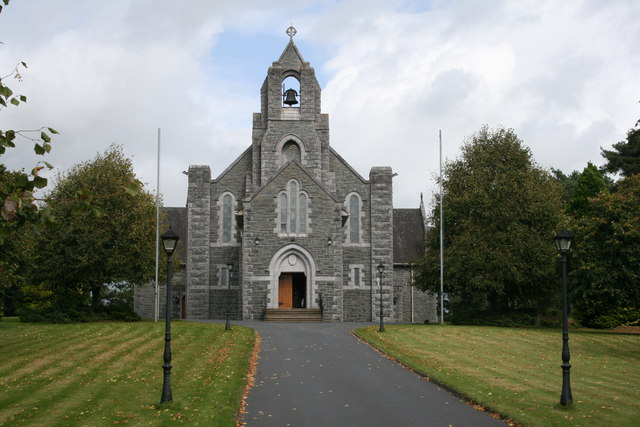
- St Michaels Church

- Location in Ireland
- Coordinates: 54.161°N 6.791°W
- Country: Ireland
- Province: Ulster
- County: County Monaghan
- Barony: Cremorne

Population (2022)
  - Total: 205

Annyalla or Annayalla (Irish: Eanaigh Gheala, meaning 'bright marshes or pools') is a small village and townland situated in the east of County Monaghan in Ireland between Castleblayney and Clontibret. As of the 2022 census, Annyalla had a population of 205. The village is located within the historical barony of Cremorne.

== Geography ==
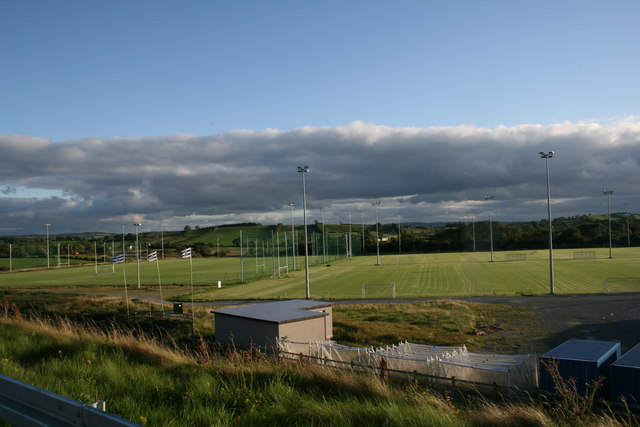
Monaghan GAA's training centre, at Cloghan, is approximately 1km from Annyalla

Annyalla townland is part of the civil parish of Clontibret. Originally located on the main N2 road from Dublin to Derry and Letterkenny, Annyalla was by-passed in 2007. The Monaghan Gaelic Athletic Association training and development centre is located in nearby Cloghan townland.

== History ==
Evidence of ancient settlement in the area includes a number of ring fort, lime kiln and megalithic monument sites in the townlands of Annayalla and Cloghan.

The main feature of the village is St Michael's Church, a Catholic place of worship built between 1922 and 1927. It was designed by the architect W.A. Scott and completed under the supervision of R.M. Butler of University College, Dublin (UCD). Annyalla's national school building, now disused, was opened in 1929.

During the War of Independence, the area was the scene of several events involving the local 2nd Monaghan Brigade 5th Northern Division IRA Battalion. For example, on 25 May 1921, a member of the Black and Tans was wounded in an ambush in which the IRA unit seized a number of weapons.

Annyalla was designated as a census town by the Central Statistics Office (CSO) for the first time in the 2016 census, at which time it had a population of 228 people. By 2022, it had a population of 205.
