= Battle of Clontibret =

Battle fought during the Nine Years War

- Part of the Nine Years' War
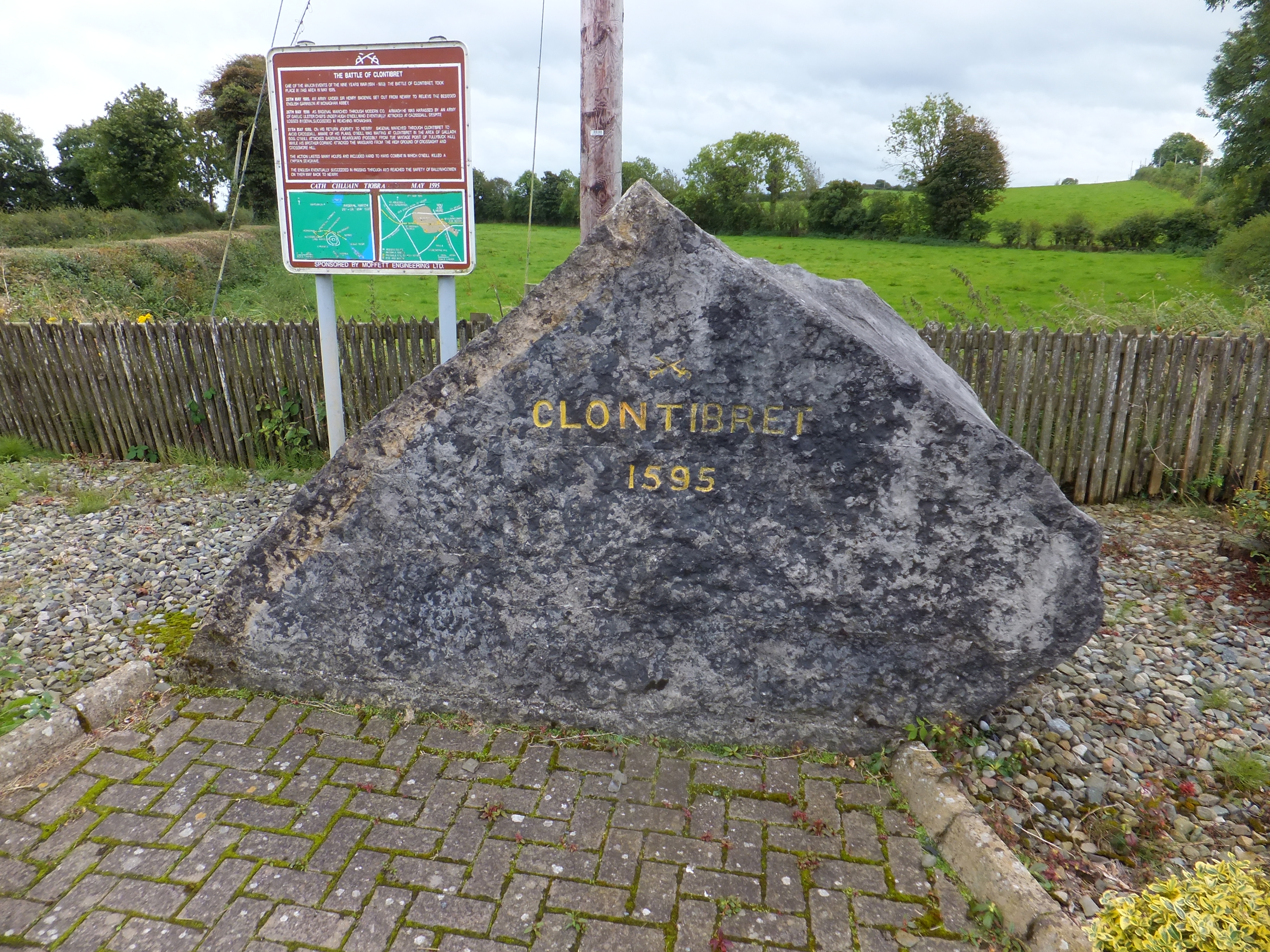
- Marker stone at the site of the battle
Date	25–27 May 1595
Location	near Clontibret, County Monaghan, Ireland
Result	Irish victory

Belligerents
England	Irish Alliance

Commanders and leaders
Sir Henry Bagenal	Hugh O'Neill, Earl of Tyrone

Strength
1,750	4,000

Casualties and losses
300–700 killed, more wounded	Low

The Battle of Clontibret was fought in County Monaghan in May 1595, during the Nine Years' War in Ireland. A column of 1,750 English troops led by Henry Bagenal was ambushed near Clontibret by a larger Gaelic Irish army led by Hugh O'Neill, Earl of Tyrone. The English column had been sent to relieve the besieged English garrison at Monaghan Castle. The English suffered very heavy losses, but a suicidal cavalry charge apparently saved it from destruction. The Irish victory shocked the English and was their first severe setback during the war.

== Background ==
The Nine Years' War began as Irish lords in Ulster responded to the encroachment of English authority on the Irish nobility's traditional rights and privileges. The breaking of the MacMahon lordship in Monaghan by the English Lord Deputy William Fitzwilliam, his willingness to allow English lords to enrich themselves at the expense of Irish lords, and the military incursions into Hugh Maguire's lordship in Fermanagh all served to convince the Irish that their patrimonies were under threat. Hugh O'Neill of Tyrone engaged in a proxy war from April 1593 to the beginning of 1595 using Hugh Maguire and Hugh Roe O'Donnell to fight the English while he reinforced his position in Ulster. However, Tyrone broke out into open warfare against the English in February 1595 when he attacked and captured the Blackwater Fort on the border of Counties Tyrone and Armagh.

O'Neill promptly besieged the English garrison at Monaghan Castle, and Sir Henry Bagenal, commander of the English forces, marched out to its relief on 25 May (4 June New Style) from Dundalk via Newry. His army was made up of 1,750 troops, including some veterans and certain companies newly arrived from the Spanish campaign in Brittany, but there were many new recruits in the ranks. Bagenal's men were mostly infantry, armed with muskets and pikes; there was also a small number of horsemen raised in the Pale. The English in Dublin did not take the threat from Tyrone's men seriously, although some thought the ammunition and gunpowder supplied to the English was insufficient. When one of the Brittany captains questioned this he was told by Lord Deputy that he had nothing to worry about as this was Ireland and not the Low Countries; the large number of troops was to "give countenance to the service".

== The battle ==
The Battle of Clontibret was essentially a two-day running battle, as Bagenal's column was ambushed on its way to and from the castle at Monaghan town. On its way to Monaghan, the English column was ambushed at Crossdall, about 4 miles (6.5 km) from the town. The English column, as described by Captain Francis Stafford, was engaged at "a place of very great disadvantage for us which he [O'Neill] knew we would pass named Crosdawlye". Tyrone sent 700-800 Irish troops armed with muskets and calivers (together known as 'shot') to contest the pass, but he was careful to ensure they were "continually seconded from their battle". There was no single English officer in charge, therefore Captain Richard Cuney drew out 150 men to hold back the Irish and enable the rest of the English army to pass. Cuney skirmished for perhaps four hours, then rejoined the column as the rear passed through to Monaghan. The action cost the English 12 killed and 30 wounded.

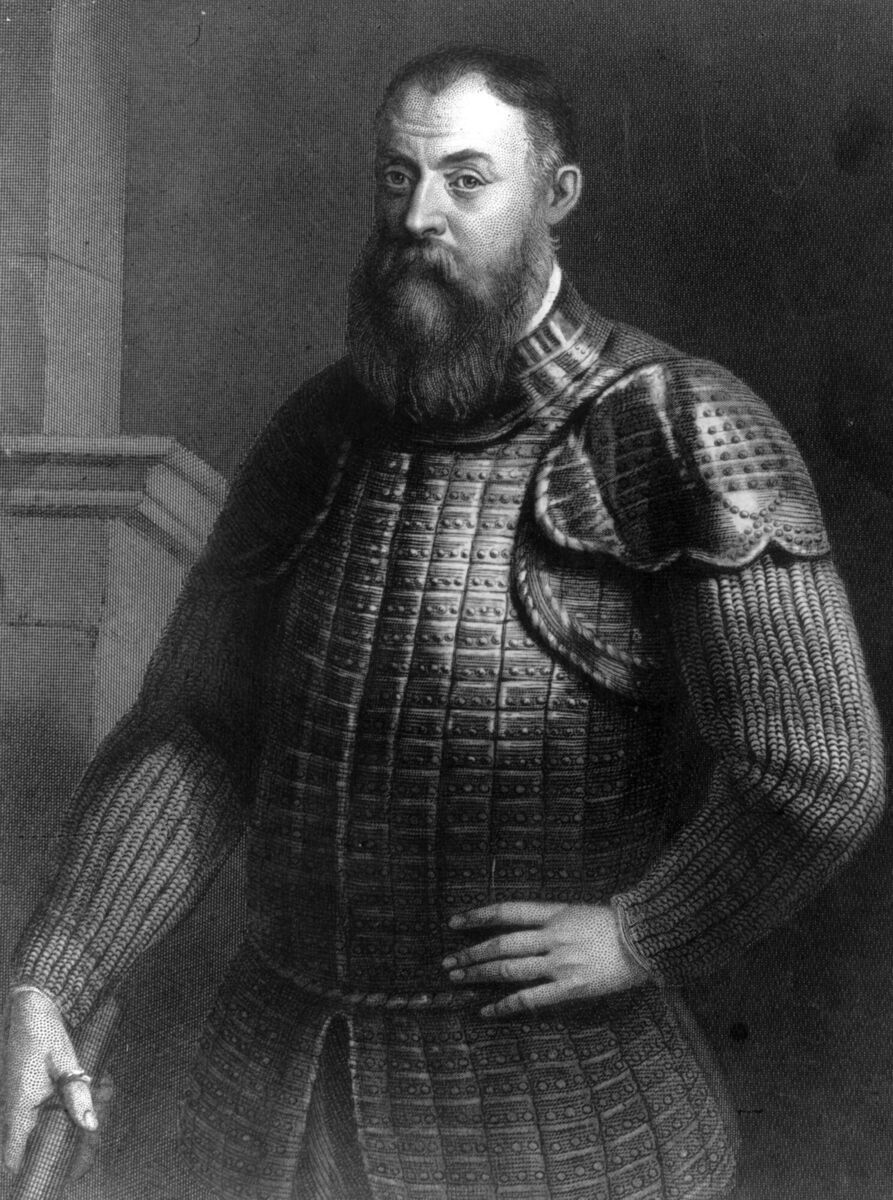
Irish military leader Hugh O'Neill, Earl of Tyrone

As Bagenal's army neared Monaghan, the Irish besieging the town withdrew. The English garrison was re-supplied and reinforced with one company. Bagenal had misgivings about his supply of gunpowder and lead, much of which had been spent on the way, and could afford little for the garrison before he started back.

The following day, 27 May, Bagenal set out for Newry in a column, but by another route past the townland of Clontibret and through drumlin country, which abounded with hills, bogs, and woods, making it ideal for an ambush. Bagenal claimed this was to protect women and children accompanying the army. Tyrone positioned troops on either side of the new line of march but, fortunately for Bagenal, Tyrone could not bring his full force to bear since an amphibious raid in Tyrconnell by Sir George Bingham had caused Tyrone's closest ally, Hugh Roe O'Donnell, to withdraw to Tyrconnell.

Tyrone's army – about 4,000 strong – consisted of contingents from the O'Neills, MacMahons and Maguires, as well as Scottish mercenaries. The Irish also deployed a greatly enlarged force of cavalry, musketeers and caliver-men. To Bagenal's puzzlement, the caliver-men wore red coats and fought expertly. Bagenal deployed his men into three bodies - the van, battle, and rear - each with a core of pikemen supported by musketeers and caliver-men. Tyrone had sent his brother, Cormac MacBaron, to occupy high ground at Crossaghy on the English right, and shot were placed in a bog on the English left while Tyrone prepared to attack the rear of the column.

The column came under fire from the outset, and then fell into a major ambush at a pass just after the church at Clontibret. The Irish attacked from front, flanks, and rear, with their shot seconded by horsemen and pike, enabling the Irish skirmishers to pour close-range gunfire into the massed English ranks from as little as thirty metres. The English column stalled, and over three hours managed to advance only a quarter-mile. The close cooperation of the Irish foot and horse shocked English officers as "having divided both horse and foot into sundry troops, and every troop of horse led by a troops of shot, wherewith he [Tyrone] would bring them within half-caliver shot of the main stand of our pikes". The Irish shot advanced, fired, then retreated to reload before returning to continue firing. The English troops began to run short on gunpowder, and as their store of munition ran critically low the English pike were forced to charge, pushing Tyrone's shot back. But the Irish shot moved forward again when the English pike rejoined the column.

Bagenal's situation grew more desperate and Tyrone moved in, hoping that a final volley would break the English formation. Just as Tyrone seemed about to break Bagenal's units a brave, but suicidal, charge by the English cavalry prevented the collapse of the English position. Led by Cornet Sedgreve, forty horse charged straight at Tyrone. Sir Ralph Lane noted that "their encounter was so rude that they were both unhorsed". Sedgreve had Tyrone by the neck, but the earl was well-armoured, wearing jack of plate; ironically, this had been given to him by Sir Christopher Hatton, the English Lord Chancellor. One of Tyrone's officers intervened, cutting off Sedgeve's arm, before Tyrone finished his opponent by thrusting his dagger into Sedgreve's groin.

The English cavalry were slaughtered, but Sedgreve's sacrifice had given Bagenal the breathing room he needed to get the column moving. The Irish had blocked all the passages through the bog, but slowly the English pushed on. The veteran troops from Brittany performed well, but many of Bagenal's men were 'new come to the wars'. However, the fierceness of the fighting had exhausted Tyrone's immediate supply of gunpowder.

The English column slowed to a crawl, and as night fell Bagenal called his men to a halt and camped at the hilltop of Ballymacowen. It seemed that hundreds were missing, and there was fear that the Irish would renew the attack under cover of darkness. But there was no further attack, and soon after dawn reinforcements from Newry arrived to relieve the column.

== Aftermath ==
According to intelligence received in the days following, Hugh O'Neill's failure to follow up had been caused by a lack of gunpowder – ironic, given the state of Bagenal's own supplies – but the overall sense in government was of disquiet, and a bad job was made of hushing up the casualty figures. This fuelled the rumours of a severe defeat, and many people set greater store on the numbers put about by the Irish side.

The defeat shocked the English in Dublin, in large part because of the modern and disciplined forces deployed by O'Neill. Lord Deputy Russell wrote "Their arms and weapons, their skill and practise therein far exceeding their wonted usage, having not only great force of pikes and muskets, but also many trained and experienced leaders as appeared by the manner of coming to the fight, and their orderly carriage therein".

One of the most experienced English officers in Ireland was unambiguous when he wrote "The state of the northern rebels is well different from that it is well wont to be; their numbers greater, their arms better, and their munition more plenty with them whereof there can be no greater proof that; there being at this present 1,700 of the best [English] footmen in Ireland at the Newry, and near 300 horse with them they dare not undertake to march thence to Dundalk, which is but eight miles...but they refrain to be sent for by water...a thing never before heard that such a troop should not be able to make their own way in Ireland".

Sir Ralph Lane, the English muster-master-general, informed the Queen's principal secretary, Lord Burghley, that "more men were hurt and killed in that late service than was convenient to declare. The casualty figures for both sides vary depending on sources. Bagenal admitted only 31 killed and 109 wounded on the second day of fighting, but his losses were almost certainly higher. The Irish annals claimed up to 700 English killed. Estimates of the Irish losses vary between 100 and 400 killed.

Three years later, Bagenal led an army into another ambush by Tyrone, at the Battle of the Yellow Ford. The English general was killed and his troops were routed with heavy losses.
