= Doohamlet =

Doohamlet Dúthamlacht
- Village
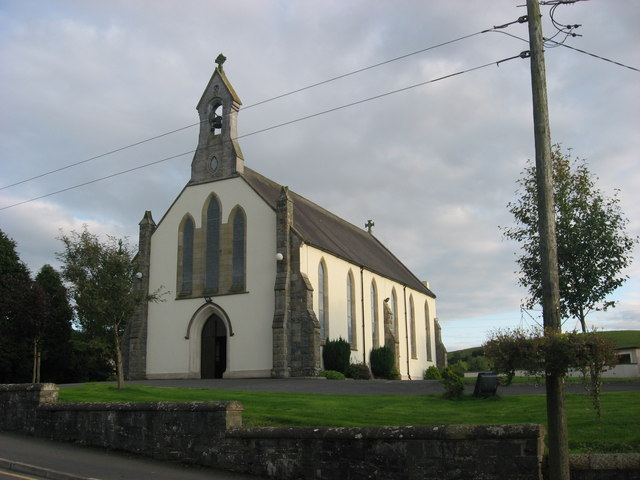
- All Saints church, Doohamlet

- Location in Ireland
- Coordinates: 54°08′N 6°49′W
- Country: Ireland
- Province: Ulster
- County: County Monaghan
- Irish grid reference: H768206

Doohamlet (/duːˈhæmlɪt/ doo-HAM-lit; Irish: Dúthamlacht, meaning 'black burial place'), is a village and townland on the Castleblayney–Ballybay road in County Monaghan, Ireland. It is part of a wider parish of Clontibret in the diocese of Clogher. Doohamlet village is located approximately three miles from the N2 Dublin-Derry route on the R183 road. The wider district comprises around thirty townlands.

Doohamlet has its own GAA club, founded in 1906, and football grounds opened in 1984. It also has a church dedicated to The Blessed Virgin and All Saints, opened in May 1861 and completed in 1882. The church was sometimes referred to as the 'Bog Chapel' due it being on the site of a penal day Mass hut or bothog, the last known such Mass site in the Catholic diocese of Clogher. The adjoining cemetery dates from the 1920s. There is a primary school called All Saints National School, opened on its present site in 1994. A Childcare facility is also adjoining the school.

There are three housing estates in the village: Cois Cill, Cois Carraig and Cois Locha, these date from the 2000s.

Doohamlet was the birthplace of Patrick Duffy, member of Dáil Éireann for the constituency of Monaghan from 1923 to 1927. He was a Cumann na nGaedheal TD.

== Transport ==
Bus Éireann route 162 serves Doohamlet on schooldays linking it to Castleblayney, Ballybay, Newbliss, Clones and Monaghan.
