= Clontibret =

Village in County Monaghan, Ireland

Clontibret Cluain Tiobrad
- Village
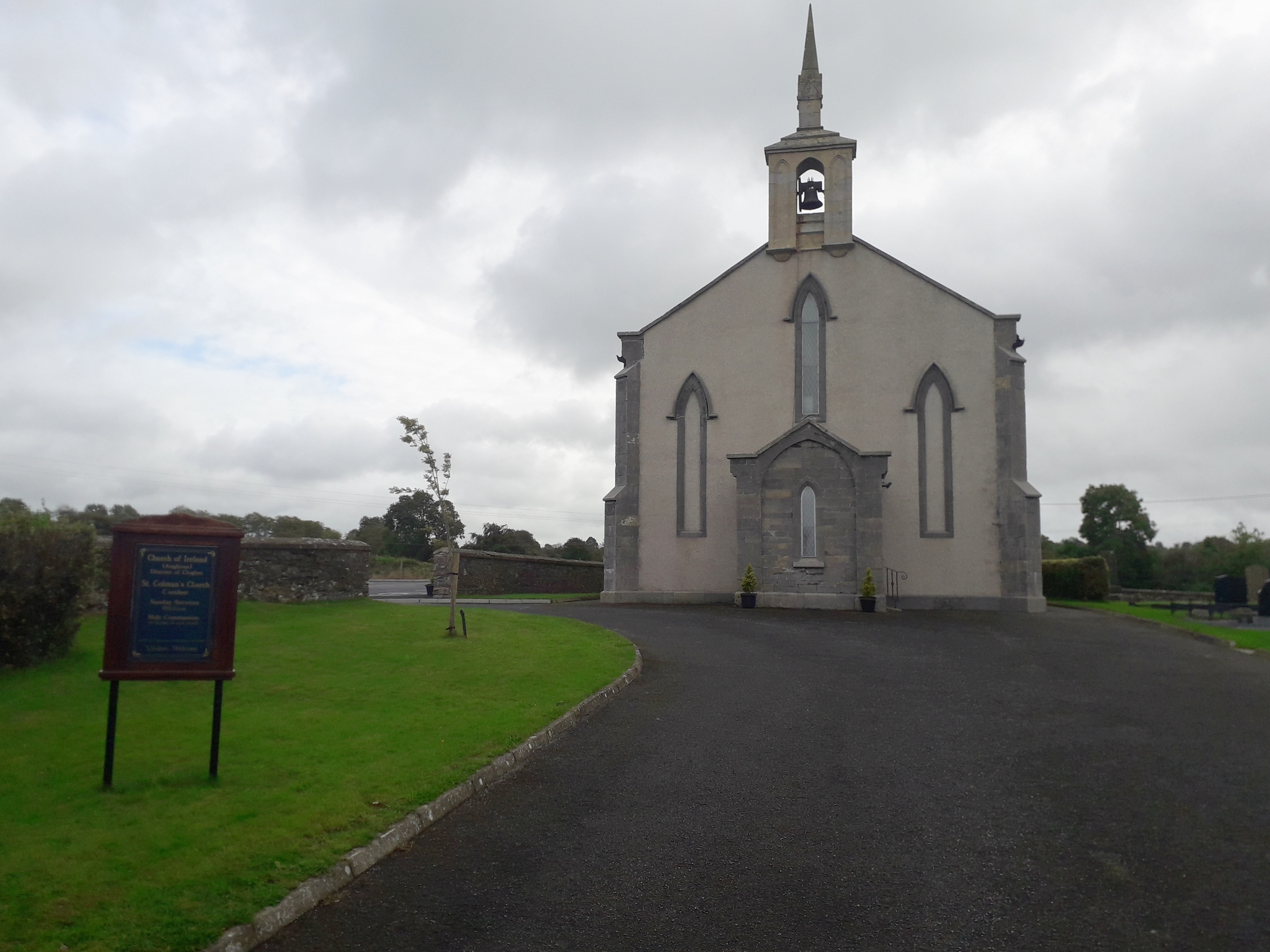
- St Coleman's Church of Ireland church, Clontibret

- Location in Ireland
- Coordinates: 54°12′55.28″N 6°51′11.95″W
- Country: Ireland
- Province: Ulster
- County: County Monaghan

Population (2022)
  - Total: 191
- Time zone: UTC+0 (WET)
  - Summer (DST): UTC-1 (IST (WEST))

Clontibret (Irish: Cluain Tiobrad, meaning 'well of the meadow') is a village and parish in County Monaghan, Ireland. The village population had a population of 191 as of the 2022 census. Clontibret is also a parish in both Roman Catholic and Church of Ireland traditions. The territory of the parish also includes Annyalla and Doohamlet as well as smaller settlements such as Cremartin, Scotch Corner and Lisnagrieve.

== Location ==
The village is close to the border with Northern Ireland, between the towns of Monaghan and Castleblayney, along the N2 national primary road which links Dublin and Derry.

== Parish ==
Clontibret is a parish in the Diocese of Clogher. The Catholic parish has three churches – St. Mary's, north of Clontibret village, St. Michael's, in the nearby village of Annyalla and All Saints, in the village of Doohamlet, which is between the towns of Castleblayney and Ballybay. The Anglican Church of Ireland is located on the ancient Christian site in Clontibret village. The wider parish area has a population of approximately 3,000 persons.

== History ==
=== 16th century ===
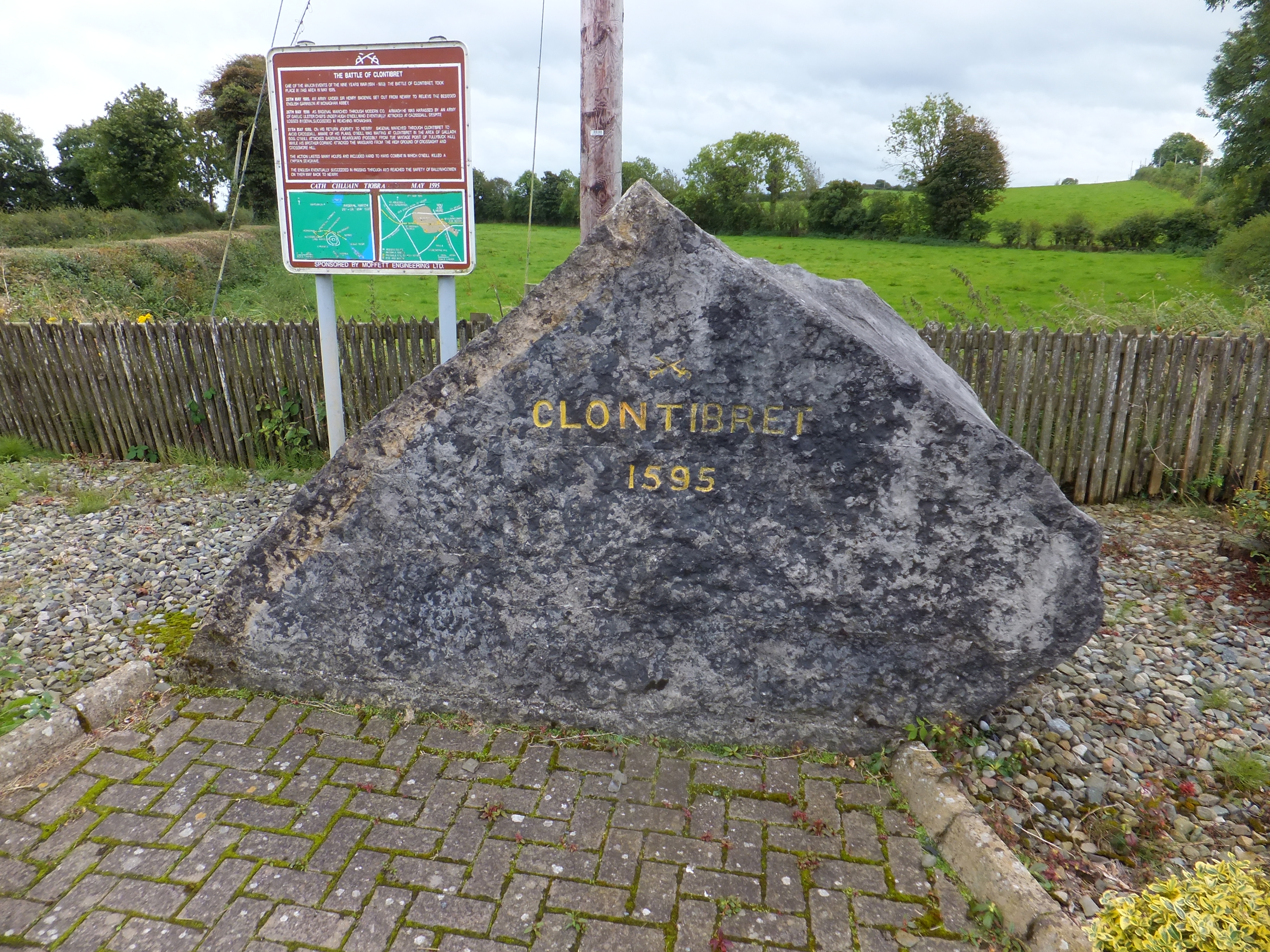
Marker commemorating the Battle of Clontibret of 1595

In 1595 the adjacent countryside was the site of the Battle of Clontibret. The territory of Monaghan had been wrested from the control of the MacMahon clan in 1591 when the clan leader was executed by English authority. Subsequent encroachments by the English into the province of Ulster led to the Nine Years War (1595–1603). The battle was the earliest clash between the two sides, with the Irish led by Hugh O'Neill and the English by Sir Henry Bagenal. Although O'Neill won the battle, the war ended with the completion of the English conquest of Ireland. In 1610 the Plantation of Ulster was established, an event that still defines certain political allegiances in Northern Ireland.

=== 20th century ===
On 7 August 1986, in protest at the Anglo-Irish Agreement, Northern Irish unionist politician Peter Robinson led a mob of 500 unionist militants and crossed the Irish border into Clontibret. During what is sometimes called the "Clontibret invasion", the group held a military parade with drills in the square, before being forced by the Gardaí to retreat across the border. Irish authorities claimed that there were no more than 150 militants. Two Gardaí were beaten by the mob, while Robinson and others were arrested, tried, and eventually fined for the incident. Riots took place at Dundalk during the trial of Robinson, where Ian Paisley, then leader of the Democratic Unionist Party (DUP) was attacked with stones and petrol bombs.

== Sport ==
The local Gaelic Athletic Association club and the Pipe Band in Clontibret are both named after Hugh O'Neill Earl of Tyrone (victor at the Battle of Clontibret in 1595). For example, the local Gaelic games club is Clontibret O'Neills, which was founded in 1913.

== Gold discovery ==
In 2008, gold was discovered locally, estimated to be more than a million ounces. This estimate, the result of work in the area by Dublin-based mineral exploration company Conroy Gold and Natural Resources, was believed by the company's directors to be the largest ever reported in Ireland and the United Kingdom.

== People ==
- John Brennan (1901–1977), a Fianna Fáil member of Seanad Éireann, was from Tassan, Clontibret.
- J. B. Bury (1861–1927), an historian, academic and professor of Roman history, was born in Clontribet
- Robert Gregg Bury (1869–1951), a clergyman, classicist, philologist and translator was born in Clontribet and worked there as a curate in 1899–1900.
- Brendan Comiskey (1935–2025), former Roman Catholic Bishop of Ferns, County Wexford, was born in Tassan, Clontibret in 1935
- Patrick Duffy (d.1675), a 17-century Roman Catholic Bishop of Clogher, is buried at what is now the Church of Ireland church. He was a native of Aughnamulen parish.
- John O'Neill (1834–1878), a Fenian general who led the ill-fated Fenian invasions of Canada in 1866, 1870 and 1871, was born at Drumgallon in Clontibret in 1839.

== See also ==
- List of towns and villages in Ireland
- Mass rocks in Clontibret
