= 2026 Laois Senior Football Championship =

136th Laois Senior Football Championship

Tournament details
- County: Laois
- Province: Leinster
- Year: 2026
- Sponsor: Laois Shopping Centre
- Date: 22 July - 11 October 2026
- Teams: 16
- Defending champions: Portarlington

Winners
- Champions: Portarlington (18th win)
- Manager: Ronan Sweeney
- Captain: Paddy O'Sullivan
- Qualify for: Leinster Club SFC

Runners-up
- Runners-up: Courtwood
- Manager: Mark Bates
- Captain: Seán O'Flynn

Promotion/Relegation
- Relegated team(s): Clonaslee–St Manman's; Park–Ratheniska; The Heath

Other
- Matches played: 37
- Website: Laois GAA

The 2026 Laois Senior Football Championship was the 136th edition of the Laois GAA's premier club Gaelic football tournament for senior graded teams in County Laois, Ireland. 16 teams competed, with the winner representing Laois in the Leinster Senior Club Football Championship.

Portarlington were the defending champions after defeating Courtwood 1-07 to 0-07 in the 2025 final. It was their 2nd in a row and their 5th championship title in six years.

Park–Ratheniska won the 2025 Laois Intermediate Football Championship and were therefore promoted to the 2026 Laois S.F.C.

Ballyfin lost to Crettyard in the relegation final, relegating them to the 2026 Laois I.F.C.

The draw for round 1 of the championship was made on the 26 February 2026.

== Format Changes ==
The 2026 Laois S.F.C was the final year of the 16 team championship format, with over the course of 2 years being reduced to a 14-team tournament in 2027 to a 12-team tournament in 2028 and beyond.

The championship started with round 1, seeded with the 8 teams that were in last years quarter-finals against the other 8 teams as well as the 2025 I.F.C Champions. The winners in Round 1 headed to Round 2A while the losers played in Round 2B. The four winners in Round 2A qualified for the quarter-finals while the four losers played against the four winners of Round 2B in Round 3. The losers of Round 2B were demoted to the Senior 'B' Championship. The Round 3 winners qualified for the quarter-finals while the losers played against the Round 2B losers in the Senior 'B' Quarter-finals.

The four losers of the Senior 'B' Quarter-finals played in the relegation semi-finals. The losers of the relegation semi-finals were relegated to the 2027 Laois I.F.C Championship. The Relegation final consisted of the two relegation semi-final winners who played each other for the right to stay in the senior grade.

With 3 teams relegated this year, along with the 2026 Laois I.F.C champions being promoted, the 2027 Laois S.F.C will consist of 14 teams.

== Team Changes ==
The following teams have changed division in since the 2025 championship season:

=== To S.F.C. ===
Promoted from 2025 I.F.C.

- Park–Ratheniska – (Intermediate Champions)

=== From S.F.C. ===
Relegated to 2026 I.F.C.

- Ballyfin

== Participating teams ==
The teams competing in the 2026 Laois S.F.C are:

Club	Location	Manager(s)	Pre C'ship Odds	2025 Championship Position	2026 Championship Position	In Championship Since	Championship Titles (Pre 2026)	Last Championship Title (Pre 2026)
Arles–Killeen	Rossena	Paddy Christie	25/1	Quarter-Finalist	Senior 'B' Semi-Finalist	2004	0	—
Ballyroan Abbey	Ballyroan	Martin Murphy	6/1	Quarter-Finalist	Quarter-Finalist	2014	8	1992
Clonaslee–St Manman's	Clonaslee		33/1	Relegation Semi-Finalist	Relegated to Intermediate	2021	0	—
Courtwood	Ballybrittas	Mark Bates	4/1	Runners-Up	Runners-Up	2019	0	—
Crettyard	Crettyard		100/1	Relegation-Finalist	Senior 'B' Champions	2025	0	—
Emo	Emo	Greg Ramsbottom	25/1	Senior 'B' Champions	Senior 'B' Semi-Finalist	2018	1	1972
Graiguecullen	Graiguecullen	Maurice Browne	16/1	Semi-Finalist	Relegation Finalist	2008	12	1965
Killeshin	Killeshin	Ryan van Haeften	25/1	Quarter-Finalist	Semi-Finalist	2012	0	—
O'Dempsey's	Killenard	Eoin Kearns	16/1	Relegation Semi-Finalist	Quarter-Finalist	2017	2	1980
Park–Ratheniska	Ratheniska	Johnny Nevin	66/1	I.F.C Champions	Relegated to Intermediate	2026	2	1953
Portarlington	Portarlington	Ronan Sweeney	8/15	Champions	Champions	1992	17	2025
Portlaoise	Portlaoise	Turlough O'Brien	4/1	Quarter-Finalist	Quarter-Finalist	1983	35	2019
Rosenallis	Rosenallis		66/1	Senior 'B' Semi-Finalist	Senior 'B' Runners-Up	2020	0	—
St Joseph's	Kellyville and Milltown	Brian Cardiff	4/1	Semi-Finalist	Semi-Finalist	1970	10	2023
Stradbally	Stradbally	Padraig Clancy	16/1	Senior 'B' Runners-Up	Quarter-Finalist	1984	17	2016
The Heath	The Heath	Donnacha Phelan	66/1	Senior 'B' Semi-Finalist	Relegated to Intermediate	2023	10	1993

== Knock-out Stage ==
=== Round 1 ===
Seeded Teams

- Portarlington (Champions)
- Courtwood (Runners-Up)
- Graiguecullen (Semi-Finalist)
- St Joseph's (Semi-Finalist)
- Arles–Killeen (Quarter-Finalist)
- Ballyroan Abbey (Quarter-Finalist)
- Killeshin (Quarter-Finalist)
- Portlaoise (Quarter-Finalist)

All 16 teams enter the competition in this round. The 8 winners progress to Round 2A, while the 8 losers progress to Round 2B.

22 July 2026 Round 1	Killeshin	2-16 (22) – (28) 2-22	Stradbally	Ratheniska
19:30 IST (UTC+1)		(HT: 0-12 – 1-09)
	Pts: Evan Lowry 1-3, Killian Roche 0-5 (2tpf, 1'45), Adam Farrell 1-1, Conor Heffernan 0-2, Evan English 0-2, Conor Hassett 0-2 (tp), Eoin Lowry 0-1	Report	Pts: David Donohue 0-6 (1f), Benny Lawlor 1-1 (1f), Joe Larkin 1-0, David Dineen 0-3 (1f), Liam Knowles 0-2 (tp), Garry Comerford 0-2 (tpf), Tom Shiel (tp), Conor Buggie 0-2, Eoin Buggie 0-2, Fionn McEvoy 0-2	Referee: Brendan McCann (Portarlington)

22 July 2026 Round 1	Graiguecullen	0-19 (19) – (11) 1-08	Emo	Portlaoise
19:30 IST (UTC+1)		(HT: 0-05 – 1-07)		Venue: O'Moore Park
	Pts: Mark Timmons 0-6 (2tp), Dylan Murphy 0-4 (1f), Jack Byrne 0-4, Aidan Bradley 0-1, Josh O'Brien 0-1, Brian Byrne 0-1, Trevor Collins 0-1, Aaron Forbes 0-1	Report	Pts: Pa Hosey 0-3, Ross Meredith 1-0, Padraig Kirwan 0-1, Ruairí Bourke 0-1 (m), Niall Gorman 0-1 (f)	Referee: Hugh Coughlan (Park–Ratheniska)

23 July 2026 Round 1	St Joseph's	1-19 (22) – (18) 1-15	Crettyard	Stradbally
19:30 IST (UTC+1)		(HT: 1-09 – 0-06)
	Pts: Robbie Murphy 0-6 (1tp), Eoghan O'Flaherty 1-2, Brian Daly 0-4 (1tp), Eoin Johnson 0-4 (2f), Mikey Keogh 0-2, Darragh Farrell 0-1	Report	Pts: Evan O'Carroll 1-8 (3f, 1'45), Cormac Murphy 0-3 (1tp), Ciarán Burke 0-2 (tp), Jack Doyle 0-1, Dara Kelly 0-1	Referee: Colin Bailey (Mountrath)

23 July 2026 Round 1	Courtwood	2-09 (15) – (11) 1-08	O'Dempsey's	Portlaoise
19:30 IST (UTC+1)		(HT: 0-03 – 0-05)		Venue: O'Moore Park
	Pts: Alan Kinsella 0-4 (4f), Cian Doyle 1-1, Dylan Keane 1-0, Ryan Little 0-1, Paul O'Flynn 0-1, Matthew Byron 0-1 (f), Rob Tyrrell 0-1	Report	Pts: Barry Howlin 0-3 (1tp), Ben Coen 1-0, Fionn Holland 0-1, Eoin Finlay 0-1, Daithi Howan 0-1, Joe Finn 0-1, Ultan Dunne 0-1 (f)	Referee: Mick Tarpey (Kilcavan)

24 July 2026 Round 1	Ballyroan Abbey	0-19 (19) – (12) 1-09	Rosenallis	Portlaoise
19:30 IST (UTC+1)		(HT: 0-09 – 1-05)		Venue: O'Moore Park
	Pts: Diarmuid Whelan 0-10 (3tp, 1tpf, 1f), Conaire Gee 0-3, Enda McWey 0-2, James McWey 0-1, Aaron McEvoy 0-1, Davin McEvoy 0-1, Cathal Doyle 0-1	Report	Pts: Charlie Friel 1-4 (1pen, 1tp, 1f), Jimmy Hyland 0-3 (1tp), Diarmuid Dooley 0-1, John O'Loughlin 0-1	Referee: Ciarán McManus (O'Dempsey's)

24 July 2026 Round 1	Portlaoise	2-17 (23) – (15) 0-15	Clonaslee–St Manman's	Vicarstown
19:30 IST (UTC+1)		(HT: 0-07 – 0-10)
	Pts: DJ White 1-4, Ben O'Connor 1-2, Emmet Maloney 0-3, Darren Brennan 0-2 (tpf), Josh Hogan 0-2 (1f), Kevin Swayne 0-1, Damon Larkin 0-1, Ricky Maher 0-1, Kieran O'Donnell 0-1	Report	Pts: Cathal Lee 0-5 (2tp, 1f), Niall Corbet 0-3 (1tpf), John Rigney 0-2, Bob Downey 0-2, James Dunne 0-1, Cian Callaghan 0-1, Darragh Scully 0-1	Referee: Seamus Mulhare (The Heath)

25 July 2026 Round 1	Arles–Killeen	2-12 (18) – (13) 2-07	Park–Ratheniska	Portlaoise
17:30 IST (UTC+1)		(HT: 1-07 – 1-02)		Venue: O'Moore Park
	Pts: Donie Kingston 1-3, Paul Kingston 0-3 (2f), Ennae Byrne 0-3, Colin Dunne 0-3, Cathal Tierney 1-0 (og)	Report	Pts: Cian Nolan 1-2, Noah Fingleton 1-1, Simon Fingleton 0-2, Conor Headen 0-1 (f), Matt Cunningham 0-1	Referee: Clifford Ward (Portarlington)

25 July 2026 Round 1	Portarlington	2-18 (24) – (11) 0-11	The Heath	Portlaoise
19:00 IST (UTC+1)		(HT: 2-10 – 0-06)		Venue: O'Moore Park
	Pts: Colm Murphy 1-4 (1f), Seán Michael Corcoran 0-5 (1tpf, 1f), Rioghan Murphy 1-1, Curtis Lyons 0-2 (0-1pen), Jordan Fitzpatrick 0-2, Seán Moran 0-1, Darragh Slevin 0-1, Seán Moran 0-1, Eoin McCann 0-1	Report	Pts: Paddy Fitzpatrick 0-4 (2tp), James Phelan 0-2 (tp), Brian Ging 0-2, Conor Booth 0-2 (2f), Neil Keane 0-1	Referee: Padraig Whelan (Barrowhouse)

=== Round 2 ===
The draw for Round 2 of the championship was held on the 25 July 2026.

==== Round 2A ====
The 8 winners from Round 1 enter this round. The 4 winners from this round will enter the draw for the quarter-finals, while the 4 losers will play in Round 3.

7 August 2026 Round 2A	Stradbally	0-16 (16) – (31) 4-19	Portarlington	Portlaoise
19:30 IST (UTC+1)		(HT: 0-10 – 1-11)		Venue: O'Moore Park
	Pts: Tom Shiel 0-6 (2tp, 1tpf), Cillian Maher 0-3 (1tpf, 1f), Garry Comerford 0-2 (tpf), Jack Deegan 0-1 (m), Conor Buggie 0-1, David Dineen 0-1, Benny Lawlor 0-1 (f), David Donohue 0-1 (f)	Report	Pts: Rioghan Murphy 3-4, Hugh Connolly 0-5, Daragh Galvin 1-0, Seán Moran 0-2, Darragh Slevin 0-2, Ronan Coffey 0-2 (1f), Jordan Fitzpatrick 0-2 (tp), Hugo Emerson 0-1, Tom Corcoran 0-1	Referee: Séamus Mulhare (The Heath)

8 August 2026 Round 2A	Portlaoise	0-26 (26) – (15) 1-12	Arles–Killeen	Portlaoise
17:30 IST (UTC+1)		(HT: 0-13 – 1-07)		Venue: O'Moore Park
	Pts: Damon Larkin 0-7 (1tp), Josh Hogan 0-5 (1f), Darren Brennan 0-2, Kevin Swayne 0-2, DJ White 0-2, Benny Carroll 0-2 (tp), Emmet Maloney 0-1, Ben Dempsey 0-1, Ricky Maher 0-1, Ciarán McEvoy 0-1, Kieran Lillis 0-1, Ben O'Connor 0-1	Report	Pts: Paul Kingston 0-5 (1tp, 1f), Colin Dunne 0-4 (1tp), Ennae Byrne 1-0, Donnie Kingston 0-2, Oisín Byrne 0-1 (f)	Referee: Ciarán McManus (O'Dempsey's)

8 August 2026 Round 2A	Courtwood	5-16 (31) – (15) 0-15	Ballyroan Abbey	Portlaoise
19:00 IST (UTC+1)		(HT: 1-11 – 0-07)		Venue: O'Moore Park
	Pts: Ryan Little 2-4 (1m), Cian Doyle 2-3, Matthew Byron 0-6 (2tpf, 2'45), Dylan Keane 1-1, Alan Kinsella 0-2 (1f)	Report	Pts: James McWey 0-9 (1tpf, 1tp, 4f), Enda McWey 0-2 (tp), Odhran Delaney 0-1, Davin McWey 0-1, Conaire Gee 0-1, Cathal Doyle 0-1	Referee: Colin Bailey (Mountrath)

9 August 2026 Round 2A	St Joseph's	1-13 (16) – (15) 1-12	Graiguecullen	Portlaoise
19:00 IST (UTC+1)		(HT: 0-06 – 0-05)		Venue: O'Moore Park
	Pts: Eoin Johnson 0-4 (1tp), Dylan Doyle 1-0, Mikie Dempsey 0-2, Robbie Murphy 0-2 (tp), Brian Daly 0-2 (tp), Oisín Hooney 0-1, Eoghan O'Flaherty 0-1, Darragh Farrell 0-1	Report	Pts: Mark Timmons 1-2 (1pen, 1tp), Josh O'Brien 0-3, Dylan Murphy 0-3 (1tpf, 1f), Trevor Collins 0-2, Brian Byrne 0-1, Jack Byrne 0-1	Referee: Brendan McCann (Portarlington)

==== Round 2B ====
The 8 losers from Round 1 enter this round. The 4 winners from this round will go into Round 3, while the 4 losers will enter the Senior 'B' quarter-finals.

6 August 2026 Round 2B	Crettyard	1-11 (14) – (19) 2-13	Park–Ratheniska	Stradbally
19:30 IST (UTC+1)		(HT: 0-05 – 1-06)
	Pts: Evan O'Carroll 0-10 (1tp, 3f, 1m), Cormac Murphy 1-0, Alex Whelan 0-1	Report	Pts: Simon Fingleton 1-4 (1f), Matt Cunningham 1-2 (1tp), Conor Headen 0-4 (2f), Podge Dunne 0-2, Tom Fingleton 0-1	Referee: Mick Tarpey (Kilcavan)

6 August 2026 Round 2B	The Heath	3-13 (22) – (19) 2-13	Clonaslee–St Manman's	Portlaoise
19:30 IST (UTC+1)		(HT: 2-06 – 1-09)		Venue: O'Moore Park
	Pts: Conor Booth 2-2 (2f), Paddy Fitzpatrick 0-7 (3f), John MacNamara 1-0, Seán Kirby 0-2, Jimmy Nerney 0-1, Denis Browne 0-1	Report	Pts: Cathal Lee 0-6 (2tp, 1f), Cian Conroy 1-1, John Rigney 1-0, Niall Corbet 0-3, Cian Callaghan 0-1, Niall Hogan 0-1, James Dunne 0-1	Referee: Clifford Ward (Portarlington)

7 August 2026 Round 2B	Killeshin	0-13 (13) – (11) 1-08	Rosenallis	Vicarstown
19:30 IST (UTC+1)		(HT: 0-08 – 0-03)
	Pts: Killian Roche 0-6 (2tpf, 2f), Eoin Lowry 0-4 (1tp), Michael Doran 0-1, Evan Lowry 0-1, Adam Farrell 0-1	Report	Pts: Charlie Friel 0-4 (3f), Paul Maher 1-0, John O'Loughlin 0-2 (tp), Jack Claffey 0-1 (f), Brian Fitzpatrick 0-1	Referee: Colin Bailey (Mountrath)

9 August 2026 Round 2B	Emo	0-06 (6) – (27) 5-12	O'Dempsey's	Portlaoise
17:30 IST (UTC+1)		(HT: 0-03 – 2-09)		Venue: O'Moore Park
	Pts: Ross Meredith 0-3 (1f), Paddy Hosey 0-2, Pa Kirwan 0-1	Report	Pts: Eoin Finlay 0-7 (2tpf, 2f), Fionn Holland 1-2, Joe Lennon 1-1, Ultan Dunne 1-0, Ben Coen 1-0, Barry Howlin 1-0, Tom Kelly 0-1, Jim Holland 0-1, Joe Finn 0-1	Referee: Des Cooney (St Joseph's)

=== Round 3 ===
The 4 losers from Round 2A enter this round and play the 4 winners from Round 2B. The 4 winners will go into the draw for the quarter-finals and the 4 losers will play against the 4 losers of Round 2B in the Senior 'B' quarter-finals.

The draw for Round 3 of the championship was held on 9 August 2026.

22 August 2026 Round 3	Stradbally	1-15 (18) – (15) 1-12	The Heath	Portlaoise
17:15 IST (UTC+1)		(HT: 0-11 – 1-08)		Venue: O'Moore Park
	Pts: Garry Comerford 0-6 (3tpf), Joe Larkin 1-0, Benny Lawlor 0-3 (1tpf, 1f), James Devoy 0-2 (tp), David Donohoe 0-1 (f), David Dineen 0-1, Fionn McEvoy 0-1, Conor Buggie 0-1	Report	Pts: Conor Booth 1-4 (1tpf, 1f), Patrick Fitzpatrick 0-3 (1f), Neil Keane 0-2, Seán Kirby 0-1, James Phelan 0-1, Jimmy Nerney 0-1	Referee: Ciarán McManus (O'Dempsey's)

22 August 2026 Round 3	Ballyroan Abbey	2-17 (23) – (17) 0-17	Park–Ratheniska	Portlaoise
19:00 IST (UTC+1)		(HT: 1-07 – 0-12)		Venue: O'Moore Park
	Pts: James McWey 0-10 (1tp, 1tpf, 5f), Davin McEvoy 1-2 (1pen), Shaun Fitzpatrick 1-1, Killian Byrne 0-2 (tp), Conor Brennan 0-2 (tp)	Report	Pts: Simon Fingleton 0-9 (1tp, 1tp-sideline, 4f), Matt Cunningham 0-5 (2tp), Tom Fingleton 0-1, Noel Fingleton 0-1, Conor Headen 0-1 (f)	Referee: Des Cooney (St Joseph's)

23 August 2026 Round 3	Arles–Killeen	1-08 (11) – (20) 0-20	O'Dempsey's	Portlaoise
14:15 IST (UTC+1)		(HT: 1-05 – 0-07)		Venue: O'Moore Park
	Pts: Colin Dunne 1-1, Paul Kingston 0-3 (2f), Oisín Byrne 0-3 (2f), Seán O'Shea 0-1	Report	Pts: Mark Barry 0-8 (1tpf, 1tp), Eoin Finlay 0-6 (2f, 1m), Joe Finn 0-2, Barry Kelly 0-1, Fionn Holland 0-1, Jack Lennon 0-1, Joe Lennon 0-1	Referee: Hugh Coughlan (Park–Ratheniska)

23 August 2026 Round 3	Graiguecullen	1-14 (17) – (21) 0-21	Killeshin	Portlaoise
16:00 IST (UTC+1)		(HT: 1-05 – 0-10)		Venue: O'Moore Park
	Pts: Dylan Murphy 0-10 (2tpf, 1tp, 2f, 1'45), Brian Byrne 1-0, Trevor Collins 0-1, Danny O'Brien 0-1, Aidan Bradley 0-1, Jack Byrne 0-1	Report	Pts: Killian Roche 0-8 (3tpf, 1tp), Evan Lowry 0-5 (1tp, 2f), Michael Doran 0-2 (tp), Eoin Cawley 0-2 (tp), Eoin Lowry 0-2, Evan English 0-1, James Doogue 0-1 (f)	Referee: Séamus Mulhare (The Heath)

=== Quarter-Finals ===
The quarter-finals will eliminate four teams, leaving four left. These teams will face off against each other in the semi-finals. The draw for the quarter-finals was conducted on 23 August 2026.

12 September 2026 Quarter-Finals	Courtwood	0-18 (18) – (15) 1-12	Stradbally	Portlaoise
17:15 IST (UTC+1)				Venue: O'Moore Park
		Report

12 September 2026 Quarter-Finals	Portlaoise	1-08 (11) – (13) 0-13	Killeshin	Portlaoise
19:00 IST (UTC+1)				Venue: O'Moore Park
		Report

13 September 2026 Quarter-Finals	St Joseph's	2-16 (22) – (16) 1-13	Ballyroan Abbey	Portlaoise
14:15 IST (UTC+1)				Venue: O'Moore Park
		Report

13 September 2026 Quarter-Finals	Portarlington	1-14 (17) – (12) 1-09	O'Dempsey's	Portlaoise
16:00 IST (UTC+1)				Venue: O'Moore Park
		Report

=== Semi-Finals ===
In the semi-finals, two further teams will be eliminated, leaving the best from each set to play each other in the Final. The draw for the semi-finals were made on 13 September 2026.

27 September 2026 Semi-Finals	Courtwood	2-16 (22) – (20) 0-20	St Joseph's	Portlaoise
14:00 IST (UTC+1)				Venue: O'Moore Park

27 September 2026 Semi-Finals	Killeshin	0-10 (10) – (25) 2-19	Portarlington	Portlaoise
15:45 IST (UTC+1)				Venue: O'Moore Park

=== Final ===
The remaining two teams play against each other to determine the champion.

As a repeat of last years final, it was Courtwood's second ever final at the senior level and were looking for their first SFC title. Portarlington entered their 6th final in seven years, with a 100% record in their previous five finals. They were aiming to win their 18th title and a third in a row.

Portarlington were 1/3 favourites, with Courtwood entering as 5/2 underdogs.

11 October 2026
15:45 IST (UTC+1)
Final

Report

Courtwood	0-08 (8) – (22) 1-19	Portarlington
(HT: 0-05 – 0-05)
Pts: Alan Kinsella 0-3 (1tp, 1f), Matthew Byron 0-3 (1tpf, 1f), Ryan Little 0-1, Cian Doyle 0-1		Pts: Colm Murphy 1-5 (1tp), Rioghan Murphy 0-4 (1tp, 1f), Jordan Fitzpatrick 0-3 (1tp), Ronan Coffey 0-3 (1tp), Jason Moore 0-1, Curtis Lyons 0-1, Darragh Galvin 0-1, Seán Michael Corcoran 0-1

O'Moore Park, Portlaoise
Referee: Des Cooney (St Joseph's)

Courtwood	Portarlington

== Senior 'B' ==
=== Senior 'B' Quarter-Finals ===
The Senior 'B' quarter-finals demote four teams to the relegation semi-finals, leaving four left. These teams will face off against each other in the Senior 'B' semi-finals. The draw for the Senior B quarter-finals was made on 23 August 2026

11 September 2026 Senior 'B' Quarter-Finals	Emo	0-22 (22) – (15) 2-09	Park–Ratheniska	Stradbally
19:30 IST (UTC+1)
		Report

12 September 2026 Senior 'B' Quarter-Finals	Clonaslee–St Manman's	0-15 (15) – (23) 2-17	Arles–Killeen	Ratheniska
16:00 IST (UTC+1)
		Report

12 September 2026 Senior 'B' Quarter-Finals	Rosenallis	2-17 (23) – (22) 5-07	The Heath	Mountmellick
16:00 IST (UTC+1)				Venue: Páirc Acragar
		Report

13 September 2026 Senior 'B' Quarter-Finals	Crettyard	2-12 (18) – (10) 0-10	Graiguecullen	Stradbally
12:00 IST (UTC+1)
		Report

=== Senior 'B' Semi-Finals ===
In the Senior 'B' semi-finals, two further teams will be eliminated, leaving the two winners to play each other in the Senior 'B' final. The draw for the Senior B semi-finals were made on 13 September 2026.

26 September 2026 Senior 'B' Semi-Finals	Emo	1-09 (12) – (27) 4-15	Rosenallis	Mountmellick
15:30 IST (UTC+1)				Venue: Páirc Acragar

26 September 2026 Senior 'B' Semi-Finals	Arles–Killeen	2-09 (15) – (22) 3-13	Crettyard	Ballylinan
15:30 IST (UTC+1)				Venue: Ballylinan GAA Grounds

=== Senior 'B' Final ===
The remaining two teams play each other in the Senior 'B' final.

10 October 2026 Senior 'B' Final	Rosenallis	2-10 (16) – (19) 5-04	Crettyard	Crettyard
18:00 IST (UTC+1)				Venue: Crettyard GAA

== Relegation Play-off ==
=== Relegation Semi-Finals ===
The two losers of the relegation semi-finals are relegated to the 2027 Laois I.F.C. The two winners will play each other in the relegation final. The draw for the relegation semi-finals were made on 13 September 2026.

25 September 2026 Relegation Semi-Final	Clonaslee–St Manman's	0-15 (15) – (20) 1-17	The Heath	Portlaoise
19:30 IST (UTC+1)				Venue: LOETB Laois Centre of Excellence

25 September 2026 Relegation Semi-Final	Graiguecullen	2-11 (17) – (9) 0-09	Park–Ratheniska	Stradbally
19:30 IST (UTC+1)

=== Relegation Final ===
The winner of the relegation final will stay within the Laois S.F.C

10 October 2026 Relegation Final	The Heath	1-10 (13) – (16) 2-10	Graiguecullen	Portlaoise
15:00 IST (UTC+1)				Venue: LOETB Laois Centre of Excellence
