= 2017 Laois Senior Football Championship =

Laois S.F.C.
- Season: 2017
- Champions: Portlaoise (33rd title)
- Relegated: Mountmellick
- Winning Captain: Conor Boyle
- Man Of The Match: Paul Cahillane
- Winning Manager: Malachy McNulty
- Matches: 31

The 2017 Laois Senior Football Championship was the 127th edition of the Laois GAA's premier club Gaelic football tournament for senior graded teams in County Laois, Ireland. The tournament consisted of 16 teams with the winner going on to represent Laois in the Leinster Senior Club Football Championship. The championship had a back-door format for the first two rounds before proceeding to a knock-out format. Generally, any team to lose two matches will be knocked out of the championship.

Stradbally were the defending champions after they defeated Portlaoise in the previous years final.

O'Dempsey's made a straight return to the senior grade after just one year outside the top flight. For this season Clonaslee–St Manman's amalgamated with Annanough for their championship matches as Clonaslee Gaels. Annanough continue to play in the IFC also.

Mountmellick were relegated to the 2018 I.F.C. after 11 years in the top-flight.

== Team changes ==
The following teams have changed division since the 2016 championship season.

=== To S.F.C. ===
Promoted from 2016 Laois Intermediate Football Championship

- O'Dempsey's - (Intermediate Champions)

=== From S.F.C. ===
Relegated to 2017 Laois Intermediate Football Championship

- Emo

== Round 1 ==
All 16 teams enter the competition in this round. The 8 winners progress to Round 2A while the 8 losers progress to Round 2B.

| 27 July 2017; Round 1 | O'Dempsey's | 2-15 - 1-12 | Ballyfin Gaels | O'Moore Park; Referee: Brendan McCann (Portarlington) |
| 27 July 2017; Round 1 | Matthew Finlay 1-3, Stephen O'Leary 0-5 (0-1f), Peter O'Leary 1-0, Michael Finlay 0-2, Barry Kelly, Rory Bracken, Eoin Finlay, Brian Nugent, Eugene Nolan 0-1 each | Report | James Finn 1-2 (0-1f), Seán Moore 0-5f, Robert Tyrell 0-2, Ricky Quillinan, James Moore, Darragh Connolly 0-1 each | O'Moore Park; Referee: Brendan McCann (Portarlington) |

| 28 July 2017; Round 1 | Ballyroan Abbey | 2-9 - 0-14 | Crettyard Gaels | O'Moore Park; Referee: Clifford Ward (Portarlington) |
| 28 July 2017; Round 1 | MJ Tierney 1-4 (0-1f, 1 '45), Diarmuid Whelan 1-4 (0-1f), Jamie Whelan 0-1 | Report | Cormac Murphy 0-9 (0-5f, 2 '45), Evan O'Carroll 0-2f, Patrick Brennan, Michael Nash, Cristoir Maher 0-1 each | O'Moore Park; Referee: Clifford Ward (Portarlington) |

| 29 July 2017; Round 1 | Portlaoise | 3-13 - 1-14 | Arles–Kilcruise | O'Moore Park; Referee: Eddie Kinsella (Courtwood) |
| 29 July 2017; Round 1 | Paul Cahillane 1-4 (0-1f, 1 '45), Benny Carroll and Scott Lawless (0-1f) 1-1 each, Adrian Kelly and Gareth Dillon 0-2 each, David Holland, Kieran Lillis, Conor Dunphy 0-1 each | Report | Ross Munnelly 0-8 (0-4f), Dermot Nolan 1-2, Chris Conway 0-3f, David conway 0-1 | O'Moore Park; Referee: Eddie Kinsella (Courtwood) |

| 29 July 2017; Round 1 | Arles–Killeen | 3-10 - 1-16 | Portarlington | O'Moore Park; Referee: Seamus Mulhare (The Heath) |
| 29 July 2017; Round 1 | Jason Enright 1-5 (0-2f), Donie Kingston 0-5 (0-1f), Paul Kingston and Donie Brennan 1-0 | Report | David Murphy 0-5, Colm Murphy 0-4 (0-2f), Steven Lyons 1-1, Evan Lyons 0-3 (0-1f), Robbie Piggott, Jonathan Fulham, Jake Foster 0-1 each | O'Moore Park; Referee: Seamus Mulhare (The Heath) |

| 30 July 2017; Round 1 | Ballylinan | 1-13 - 1-7 | Mountmellick | O'Moore Park; Referee: Eddie Kinsella (Courtwood) |
| 30 July 2017; Round 1 | Ciaran Farrell 1-3, Andy McEvoy 0-4, Gary Walsh 0-3f, Cathail Dunne 0-2, Jamie Farrell 0-1 | Report | Niall Mullen 0-4f, Mark Grennan 1-0, Brendan Reddin 0-2, Gearoid Hanrahan 0-1 | O'Moore Park; Referee: Eddie Kinsella (Courtwood) |

| 30 July 2017; Round 1 | St Joseph's | 1-12 - 0-7 | Clonaslee Gaels | O'Moore Park; Referee: Maurice Deegan (Stradbally) |
| 30 July 2017; Round 1 | Brendan Hickey 1-2, Dan Dunne 0-5f, Dylan Doyle 0-2, Brian Daly (0-1f), Jason Campion, Peter Kealy (0-1f) 0-1 each | Report | Glen McEvoy 0-3 (0-2f), James Miller 0-2, Donal Miller and Darren Hogan 0-1 each | O'Moore Park; Referee: Maurice Deegan (Stradbally) |

| 30 July 2017; Round 1 | Graiguecullen | 2-11 - 0-15 | Killeshin | O'Moore Park; Referee: David Moore (St Joseph’s) |
| 30 July 2017; Round 1 | Ambrose Doran 1-3 (0-1f), Chris Hurley 1-0, Ross Hennessy and Brian Byrne 0-2 each, Danny Bolger (0-1f), Luke Alsybury, Mark Timmons, Ian Fleming 0-1 each | Report | David Aston 0-8 (0-6f), Mark McDermott, Cathal Brennan, Damien Lowry 0-2 each, Eoin Lowry 0-1 | O'Moore Park; Referee: David Moore (St Joseph’s) |

| 30 July 2017; Round 1 | The Heath | 3-10 - 1-12 | Stradbally | O'Moore Park; Referee: Joe Brennan (Crettyard) |
| 30 July 2017; Round 1 | Brian Ging 1-2, Chris Bergin 1-1, James Phelan 1-0, Daithí Carroll 0-3 (0-2f), Colin Nestor 0-2, Alan Whelan and Podge Whelan 0-1 each | Report | Jody Dillon 0-5 (0-4f), Gary Comerford 1-1, Colm Kelly (0-1f) and Tom Shiel 0-2 each, Eoin Buggie and Colm Begley (0-1f) 0-1 each | O'Moore Park; Referee: Joe Brennan (Crettyard) |

| 3 August 2017; Round 1 Replay | Portarlington | 3-14 - 1-13 | Arles–Killeen | O'Moore Park; Referee: Maurice Deegan (Stradbally) |
| 3 August 2017; Round 1 Replay | Colm Murphy 2-3 (0-2 frees), Jason Moore 1-3, Evan Lyons 0-3 (0-2f), Paddy O'Sullivan, Robbie Piggott, Jake Foster, David Murphy, Jordan Fitzpatrick 0-1 each | Report | Jason Enright 1-3 (1-0 pen, 0-1f), Donie Kingston 0-4 (0-2f), Paul Kingston 0-3, Conor Keightley 0-2, Sean O’Shea 0-1 | O'Moore Park; Referee: Maurice Deegan (Stradbally) |

== Round 2 ==
=== Round 2A ===
The 8 winners from Round 1 enter this round. The 4 winners will enter the draw for the quarter-finals while the 4 losers will play in Round 3.

| 11 August 2017; Round 2A | Graiguecullen | 0-10 - 0-8 | The Heath | O'Moore Park; Referee: Eddie Kinsella (Courtwood) |
| 11 August 2017; Round 2A | Ian Fleming 0-5f, Ambrose Doran 0-2, Mark Timmons, Ross Hennessy (0-1f), Brian Byrne 0-1 each | Report | Daithi Carroll 0-5 (0-2f), Brian Ging, Eoin Delaney, Mark Dunne 0-1 each | O'Moore Park; Referee: Eddie Kinsella (Courtwood) |

| 12 August 2017; Round 2A | Ballylinan | 3-13 - 2-7 | St Joseph's | O'Moore Park |
| 12 August 2017; Round 2A | | Report | | O'Moore Park |

| 12 August 2017; Round 2A | Portlaoise | 5-14 - 1-14 | O'Dempsey's | O'Moore Park; Referee: John Flynn (The Rock) |
| 12 August 2017; Round 2A | Paul Cahillane 2-4 (1-0 pen, 0-1f), Adrian Kelly 2-0, Brian McCormack 0-4, Ciaran McEvoy 1-0, Benny Carroll and Scott Lawless (0-1f) 0-2 each, Conor Dunphy and Gareth Dillon 0-1 each | Report | Stephen O'Leary 0-7 (0-6f), Michael Finlay 1-0, Brian Nugent 0-2, Barry Kelly, Eoin Finlay, Conor Meredith, Peter O'Leary, Darren Fitzpatrick 0-1 each | O'Moore Park; Referee: John Flynn (The Rock) |

| 13 August 2017; Round 2A | Portarlington | 2-23 - 0-10 | Ballyroan Abbey | O'Moore Park |
| 13 August 2017; Round 2A | | Report | | O'Moore Park |

=== Round 2B ===
The 8 losers from Round 1 enter this round. The 4 winners will go into the Round 3 while the 4 losers will enter the Relegation Playoffs.

| 12 August 2017; Round 2B | Ballyfin Gaels | 3-18 - 0-18 | Stradbally | O'Moore Park |
| 12 August 2017; Round 2B | | Report | | O'Moore Park |

| 13 August 2017; Round 2B | Killeshin | 2-15 - 1-16 | Arles–Kilcruise | O'Moore Park |
| 13 August 2017; Round 2B | | Report | | O'Moore Park |

| 13 August 2017; Round 2B | Arles–Killeen | 2-17 - 2-11 | Mountmellick | O'Moore Park |
| 13 August 2017; Round 2B | | Report | | O'Moore Park |

| 13 August 2017; Round 2B | Crettyard Gaels | 1-12 - 1-9 | Clonaslee Gaels | O'Moore Park |
| 13 August 2017; Round 2B | | Report | | O'Moore Park |

== Round 3 ==
The 4 losers from Round 2A enter this round and they play the 4 winners from Round 2B. The 4 winners will go into the draw for the quarter-finals.

| 26 August 2017; 6.00 pm Round 3 | O'Dempsey's | 5-13 - 0-14 | Crettyard Gaels | O'Moore Park; Referee: Maurice Deegan (Stradbally) |
| 26 August 2017; 6.00 pm Round 3 | | Report | | O'Moore Park; Referee: Maurice Deegan (Stradbally) |

| 26 August 2017; 7.30 pm Round 3 | Arles–Killeen | 2-14 - 0-7 | Ballyroan Abbey | O'Moore Park; Referee: Joe Brennan (Crettyard) |
| 26 August 2017; 7.30 pm Round 3 | | Report | | O'Moore Park; Referee: Joe Brennan (Crettyard) |

| 27 August 2017; 6.00 pm Round 3 | Killeshin | 1-12 - 1-11 | The Heath | O'Moore Park; Referee: David Moore (St Joseph's) |
| 27 August 2017; 6.00 pm Round 3 | | Report | | O'Moore Park; Referee: David Moore (St Joseph's) |

| 27 August 2017; 7.30 pm Round 3 | St Joseph's | 2-10 - 1-6 | Ballyfin Gaels | O'Moore Park; Referee: Pat Moran (Graiguecullen) |
| 27 August 2017; 7.30 pm Round 3 | | Report | | O'Moore Park; Referee: Pat Moran (Graiguecullen) |

== Quarter-finals ==
| 15 September 2017; 7:45 pm Quarter-Final | Graiguecullen | 0-11 - 2-4 | St Joseph's | O'Moore Park; Referee: Eddie Kinsella (Courtwood); Man of the Match: Mark Timmons |
| 15 September 2017; 7:45 pm Quarter-Final | Ian Flemming 0-3f, Jamie Parr (0-1f) and Ambrose Doran 0-2 each, Luke Alsybury, Mark Timmons, Trevor Collins, Ross Hennessey (0-1f) 0-1 each | Report | Brendan Hickey 1-1, Dan Dunne 1-0, Mattie Campion, Jason Campion, Enda Butler 0-1 each | O'Moore Park; Referee: Eddie Kinsella (Courtwood); Man of the Match: Mark Timmons |

| 16 September 2017; 4:30 pm Quarter-Final | Portlaoise | 0-15 - 1-4 | O'Dempsey's | O'Moore Park; Referee: David Moore (St Joseph's); Man of the Match: Brian McCormack |
| 16 September 2017; 4:30 pm Quarter-Final | Brian McCormack 0-4, Gareth Dillon 0-3, Scott Lawless 0-2 (0-1f), Brian Mulligan, Kieran Lillis, Conor Dunphy, Conor Boyle, Benny Carroll, Paul Cahillane (0-1f) 0-1 each | Report | Conor Meredith 1-0 pen, Brian Nugent (0-1f), Matthew Finlay, Stephen O'Leary, Eoin Finlay 0-1 each | O'Moore Park; Referee: David Moore (St Joseph's); Man of the Match: Brian McCormack |

| 16 September 2017; 6:00 pm Quarter-Final | Portarlington | 3-10 - 0-13 | Arles–Killeen | O'Moore Park; Referee: John Flynn (The Rock); Man of the Match: David Murphy |
| 16 September 2017; 6:00 pm Quarter-Final | Jordan Fitzpatrick 2-0, David Murphy 1-2, Evan Lyons 0-3f, Colm Murphy 0-2f, Paddy O'Sullivan, Jonathan Fullam, Kevin McGrath 0-1 each | Report | Jason Enright 0-5 (0-4f), Donie Kingston 0-4 (0-3f), Paul Kingston 0-2 (0-1f), Sean O'Shea and Shane Julian 0-1 each | O'Moore Park; Referee: John Flynn (The Rock); Man of the Match: David Murphy |

| 16 September 2017; 7:30 pm Quarter-Final | Ballylinan | 3-8 - 1-5 | Killeshin | O'Moore Park; Referee: Maurice Deegan (Stradbally); Man of the Match: Alan Farrell |
| 16 September 2017; 7:30 pm Quarter-Final | Gary Walsh 1-3 (0-1f), Alan Farrell 1-2, James Redmond 1-0, Andy McEvoy 0-2, Ciaran Farrell 0-1 | Report | Eoin Lowry 1-1, David Aston 0-2 (0-1f), Stephen Attride and Cathal Brennan 0-1 each | O'Moore Park; Referee: Maurice Deegan (Stradbally); Man of the Match: Alan Farrell |

== Semi-finals ==
| 1 October 2017; 2:00 pm Semi-Final | Portlaoise | 1-12 - 0-8 | Graiguecullen | O'Moore Park; Referee: Maurice Deegan (Stradbally); Man of the Match: Kieran Lillis |
| 1 October 2017; 2:00 pm Semi-Final | Paul Cahillane 0-5 (0-3f), Conor Dunphy 1-0, Conor Boyle and Scott Lawless (0-1f) 0-2 each, Kieran Lillis, Gareth Dillon, Brian McCormack 0-1 each | Report | Ian Fleming (0-2f) and Ross Hennessy (0-2f) 0-2 each, Luke Alsybury, Aaron Forbes, Ambrose Doran, Daniel O'Reilly 0-1 each. | O'Moore Park; Referee: Maurice Deegan (Stradbally); Man of the Match: Kieran Lillis |

| 1 October 2017; 3:30 pm Semi-Final | Ballylinan | 4-10 - 3-8 | Portarlington | O'Moore Park; Referee: Eddie Kinsella (Courtwood); Man of the Match: David Murphy |
| 1 October 2017; 3:30 pm Semi-Final | Gary Walsh (0-1f) and Cathail Dunne 1-3 each, Jamie Farrell and Andy McEvoy 1-1 each, Seamus Lacey and Alan Farrell 0-1 each | Report | David Murphy 2-4, Colm Murphy 1-3 (0-2f), Kevin McGrath 0-1 | O'Moore Park; Referee: Eddie Kinsella (Courtwood); Man of the Match: David Murphy |

== Final ==
| 15 October 2017; 3:45 pm Final | Portlaoise | 3-13 - 0-10 | Ballylinan | O'Moore Park; Referee: John Flynn (The Rock); Man of the Match: Paul Cahillane |
| 15 October 2017; 3:45 pm Final | Paul Cahillane 1-6 (0-4f), Scott Lawless 1-1, John Kavanagh 1-0, Conor Boyle 0-2, Adrian Kelly, Ciaran McEvoy, Benny Carroll, Brian McCormack 0-1 each | Report | Gary Walsh 0-7 (0-5f), Alan Farrell, Cathail Dunne, Andy McEvoy 0-1 each | O'Moore Park; Referee: John Flynn (The Rock); Man of the Match: Paul Cahillane |

== Relegation playoff ==
=== Relegation Semi-Finals ===
27 August 2017
12.00pm
Relegation Semi-Final

| Stradbally | 2-15 - 1-9 | Arles–Kilcruise |
|---|---|---|
| | Report |

Ratheniska
27 August 2017
12.00 pm
Relegation Semi-Final

| Mountmellick | 3-15 - 2-11 | Clonaslee Gaels |
|---|---|---|
| | Report |

Portarlington

=== Relegation Final ===
15 September 2017
7:00pm
Relegation Final

| Arles–Kilcruise | 2-13 - 1-14 | Mountmellick |

Stradbally
