= 2015 Laois Senior Football Championship =

Laois S.F.C.
- Season: 2015
- Champions: Portlaoise; 32nd Senior Championship Title
- Relegated: O'Dempsey's
- Leinster SCFC: Portlaoise
- All Ireland SCFC: n/a
- Winning Captain: Kieran Lillis
- Man of the Match: ???
- Matches: 56

The 2015 Laois Senior Football Championship is the 125th edition of the Laois GAA's premier club Gaelic football tournament for senior graded teams in County Laois, Ireland. The tournament consists of 16 teams with the winner going on to represent Laois in the Leinster Senior Club Football Championship. The championship has a back-door format for the first two rounds before proceeding to a knock-out format. Generally, any team to lose two matches will be knocked out of the championship.

Portlaoise were the defending champions after they defeated Arles–Killeen in the previous year's final, and they successfully defended their title and also claimed a nine-in-a-row of titles (their 32nd altogether) when beating Emo in the final replay at O'Moore Park on 24 October 2015 by 2-13 to 0-7.

This was Ballyfin's first year at the senior grade after winning the Laois Intermediate Championship in 2014.

O'Dempsey's were relegated to the Intermediate grade.

== Team changes ==
The following teams have changed division since the 2014 championship season.

=== To S.F.C. ===
Promoted from I.F.C.

- Ballyfin - (Intermediate Champions)

=== From S.F.C. ===
Relegated to I.F.C.

- None

== Round 1 ==
All 16 teams enter the competition in this round. The 8 winners progress to Round 2A while the 8 losers progress to Round 2B.

- Arles–Killeen 1-14, 0-11 Ballylinan, O'Moore Park, 6/8/2015,
- Mountmellick 0-13, 0-11 Portarlington, O'Moore Park, 7/8/2015,
- Arles–Kilcruise 0-8, 0-8 Graiguecullen, O'Moore Park, 8/8/2015,
- The Heath 3-13, 0-9 Emo, O'Moore Park, 8/8/2015,
- Portlaoise 1-12, 0-5 Stradbally, O'Moore Park, 8/8/2015,
- St Joseph's 1-9, 0-7 Ballyfin, O'Moore Park, 9/8/2015,
- Ballyroan Abbey 1-8, 1-6 Crettyard, O'Moore Park, 9/8/2015,
- Killeshin 2-14, 2-11 O'Dempsey's, O'Moore Park, 9/8/2015,
- Arles–Kilcruise 2-16, 1-9 Graiguecullen, O'Moore Park, 13/8/2015, (Replay)

== Round 2 ==
=== Round 2A ===
The 8 winners from Round 1 enter this round. The 4 winners will enter the draw for the quarter-finals while the 4 losers will play in Round 3.

- Arles–Killeen 1-11, 0-11 Arles–Kilcruise, O'Moore Park, 22/8/2015,
- The Heath 2-14, 0-7 Ballyroan Abbey, O'Moore Park, 22/8/2015,
- St Joseph's 2-13, 0-6 Mountmellick, O'Moore Park, 23/8/2015,
- Portlaoise 1-16, 0-7 Killeshin, O'Moore Park, 23/8/2015,

=== Round 2B ===
The 8 losers from Round 1 enter this round. The 4 winners will go into the Round 3 while the 4 losers will enter the Relegation Playoffs.

- Portarlington 0-11, 0-11 Stradbally, O'Moore Park, 21/8/2015,
- Crettyard 3-13, 4-4 Ballyfin, O'Moore Park, 22/8/2015,
- Emo 1-13, 1-11 Ballylinan, O'Moore Park, 23/8/2015,
- Graiguecullen 1-13, 1-7 O'Dempsey's, O'Moore Park, 23/8/2015,
- Portarlington 3-15, 0-7 Stradbally, O'Moore Park, 27/8/2015, (Replay)

== Round 3 ==
The 4 losers from Round 2A enter this round and they play the 4 winners from Round 2B. The 4 winners will go into the draw for the quarter-finals.

- Mountmellick 2-11, 1-14 Crettyard, O'Moore Park, 2/9/2015,
- Graiguecullen 2-9, 0-11 Ballyroan Abbey, O'Moore Park, 2/9/2015,
- Arles–Kilcruise 2-8, 0-10 Portarlington, O'Moore Park, 3/9/2015,
- Emo 2-9, 0-7 Killeshin, O'Moore Park, 4/9/2015,
- Mountmellick 0-15, 1-12 Crettyard, O'Moore Park, 10/9/2015, (Replay A.E.T.)
- Mountmellick 2-12, 0-13 Crettyard, O'Moore Park, 17/9/2015, (2nd Replay)

== Quarter-finals ==
Quarter-Finals		Semi-Finals		Final
The Heath	0-10 R
Arles–Kilcruise	1-16 R	Arles–Kilcruise	0-8 R
Emo	2-10	Emo	3-8 R
St Joseph's	1-8			Portlaoise	2-13 R
Portlaoise	4-18			Emo	0-7 R
Mountmellick	0-5	Portlaoise	1-18
Arles–Killeen	3-10	Arles–Killeen	1-11
Graiguecullen	1-11

- Arles–Killeen 3-10, 1-11 Graiguecullen, O'Moore Park, 18/9/2015,
- Emo 2-10, 1-8 St Joseph's, O'Moore Park, 19/9/2015,
- Arles–Kilcruise 1-11, 1-11 The Heath, O'Moore Park, 19/9/2015,
- Portlaoise 4-18, 0-5 Mountmellick, O'Moore Park, 21/9/2015,
- Arles–Kilcruise 1-16, 0-10 The Heath, O'Moore Park, 25/9/2015, (Replay)

== Semi-finals ==
- Emo 0-13, 1-10 Arles–Kilcruise, O'Moore Park, 4/10/2015,
- Portlaoise 1-18, 1-11 Arles–Killeen, O'Moore Park, 4/10/2015,
- Emo 3-8, 0-8 Arles–Kilcruise, O'Moore Park, 8/10/2015, (Replay)

== Final ==
18 October 2015
5:15pm
Final

Portlaoise	0-15 - 2-9	Emo
	Report

O'Moore Park
Referee: David Moore, Graiguecullen.
24 October 2015
6:30pm
Final replay

Portlaoise	2-13 - 0-7	Emo
	Report

O'Moore Park
Referee: Maurice Deegan, Stradbally.

== Relegation playoff ==
=== Relegation Semi-Finals ===
- Ballyfin 1-11, 1-10 Ballylinan, Ratheniska, 19/9/2015,
- Stradbally 1-13, 1-12 O'Dempsey's, Annanough, 19/9/2015,

=== Relegation Final ===
- Ballyfin 1-11, 2-6 O'Dempsey's, Ratheniska, 3/10/2015,
