= Laois Junior Football Championship =

Annual Gaelic football competition

The Laois Junior Football Championships are the lower-tier Laois Club Football Championships.

The Junior A and Junior B Championships use group phases then down to eight-four-two and the Junior C Championship operates similarly to the Senior Championship and Intermediate Championship by going for a straight knockout.

Portlaoise are the title holders (2022), having defeated Barrowhouse in the final.

== Laois Junior Football Championship ==
Laois Junior Football Championship
- Irish: Craobh Peil Sóisir Laoise
- Founded: 1906
- Trophy: Shaw Cup
- Title holders: Kilcavan (5th title)
- Most titles: Portlaoise (8 titles)
- Sponsors: Sparrow Insurances

The Laois Junior Football Championship is an annual Gaelic football competition contested by lower-tier Laois GAA clubs.

Kilcavan are the title holders (2024) defeating St Joseph's in the final.

=== Honours ===
The trophy presented to the winners is the Shaw Cup.

The winners of the Laois Junior Championship qualify to represent their county in the Leinster Junior Club Football Championship. The winners can, in turn, go on to play in the All-Ireland Junior Club Football Championship. They often do well outside the county, with the likes of Rosenallis (2016) and Park–Ratheniska (2006) among the clubs from Laois to win at least one Leinster Championship after winning the Laois Junior Football Championship. The winners enter the All-Ireland at the quarter-final stage, unless drawn against the British champions in the quarter-finals.

=== History ===
The Laois Junior A Football Championship was first held in 1906, with Durrow the victors.

In the mid-1990s, Rosenallis won the Junior Championship and then went on to win the Intermediate Championship back-to-back.

Laois full-back Martin Dempsey played in the 2004 final, at centre-forward.

In 2016, Rosenallis won a dual championship — junior football and intermediate hurling.

Laois players Tom Kelly (2003 All Star and 2005 International Rules Series Player of the Series) and Noel Garvan (who also won a Leinster Senior Football Championship in 2003) were involved in the 2017 final.

=== List of finals ===
Year	Winner	Opponent
1906	Durrow	
1907	Ballyroan	
1908	Portlaoise	
1909	Ballybrittas	
1910	Durrow	
1911	Portlaoise	
1912	No competition	
1913	Ratheniska	
1914	The Heath	
1915	Ballybrittas	
1916	No competition	
1917	No competition	
1918	Borris-in-Ossory	
1919	Portarlington	
1920	Wolfhill	
1921	Mountmellick	
1922	Greenroad, Portlaoise	
1923	No competition	
1924	No competition	
1925	No competition	
1926	The Hollow	
1927	Barrowhouse	
1928	Loughteague	
1929	Mountmellick	
1930	The Heath	
1931	Portarlington	
1932	Abbeyleix	
1933	Ballylinan	
1934	Clonad	
1935	Portlaoise	
1936	Graiguecullen	
1937	Ballylinan	
1938	Jamestown	
1939	St Fintan's, Mountrath	
1940	Clonad	
1941	Mountmellick	Ballyfin
1942	Park	Old Pound
1943	Park	
1944	Spink	Ballybrittas
1945	Ballyadams	
1946	Barrowhouse	
1947	Kilminchy	
1948	Jamestown	Mountmellick
1949	The Heath	
1950	St Fintan's Hospital	
1951	O'Dempseys	
1952	Fairymount	Jamestown
1953	Jamestown	
1954	Portarlington	Spink
1955	Graiguecullen	Portlaoise
1956	Ballylinan	
1957	Killeshin	Mountmellick
1958	Stradbally	St Fintan's Hospital
1959	St Fintan's Hospital	Kilcavan
1960	Kilcavan	Timahoe
1961	Crettyard	Ballylinan
1962	Emo	Portlaoise
1963	Ballyroan	Portarlington
1964	St Fintan's Hospital	Kilcavan
1965	Arles	Portlaoise
1966	Mountmellick	Kilcavan
1967	St Joseph's	Portlaoise
1968	Portarlington	Courtwood
1969	Killeshin	Rathdowney
1970	Courtwood	Abbeyleix
1971	Ballylinan	Kilcavan
1972	Mountmellick	Ballinakill
1973	Portlaoise	Abbeyleix
1974	Barrowhouse	Abbeyleix
1975	Graiguecullen	Durrow
1976	St Joseph's	Park
1977	Portlaoise 0-10	St Manman's 1-4
1978	St Manman's	The Rock
1979	The Rock	Ballinakill
1980	Camross	Ballyfin
1981	Killeshin	St Fintan's, Mountrath
1982	Durrow	St Joseph's
1983	Portarlington	Portlaoise
1984	Stradbally	St Fintan's, Mountrath
1985	The Heath	St Joseph's
1986	Courtwood	Ballyroan
1987	Spink	Portlaoise
1988	Portlaoise	Rosenallis
1989	The Harps	Ballyroan
1990	The Heath	Rosenallis
1991	Arles–Kilcruise	Rosenallis
1992	Portlaoise	St Manman's
1993	Kilcavan	St Joseph's
1994	Rosenallis	St Manman's
1995	Ballyfin	Ballyroan
1996	Arles–Kilcruise	St Manman's
1997	St Manman's	St Fintan's, Mountrath
1998	Ballyroan	Portlaoise
1999	Portlaoise	Graiguecullen
2000	The Harps	Abbeyleix
2001	Abbeyleix	Stradbally
2002	Portlaoise	Stradbally
2003	Stradbally	The Heath
2004	Kilcavan 1-11	St Joseph's 1-8
2005	Portlaoise	Park–Ratheniska
2006	Park–Ratheniska	Barrowhouse
2007	Ballinakill	St Joseph's
2008	Killeshin	The Heath
2009	The Heath	Ballyfin
2010	Ballyfin	Spink
2011	Spink 1-10	Graiguecullen 2-04
2012	Graiguecullen	
2013	Kilcavan	
2014	Courtwood	
2015	Barrowhouse	
2016	Rosenallis	
2017		
2018		
2019		
2020	Park–Ratheniska	
2021		
2022	Portlaoise 1-11	Barrowhouse 0-08
2023		
2024	Kilcavan	St Joseph's
2025		

Laois Junior B Football Championship
- Irish: Craobh Peil Sóisir B Laoise
- Founded: 1972
- Trophy: Chris Lalor Cup
- Title holders: Graiguecullen (2nd title)
- Most titles: Stradbally (3 titles)
- Sponsors: Sparrow Insurances

== Laois Junior B Football Championship ==
The Laois Junior B Football Championship is an annual Gaelic football competition contested by fourth grade Laois GAA clubs.

The trophy presented to the winners is the Chris Lalor Cup.

The COVID-19 pandemic delayed the completion of the 2020 Laois Junior B Football Championship until the second half of 2021. The semi-finals were played in October 2020. The final was played in August 2021.

=== List of finals ===
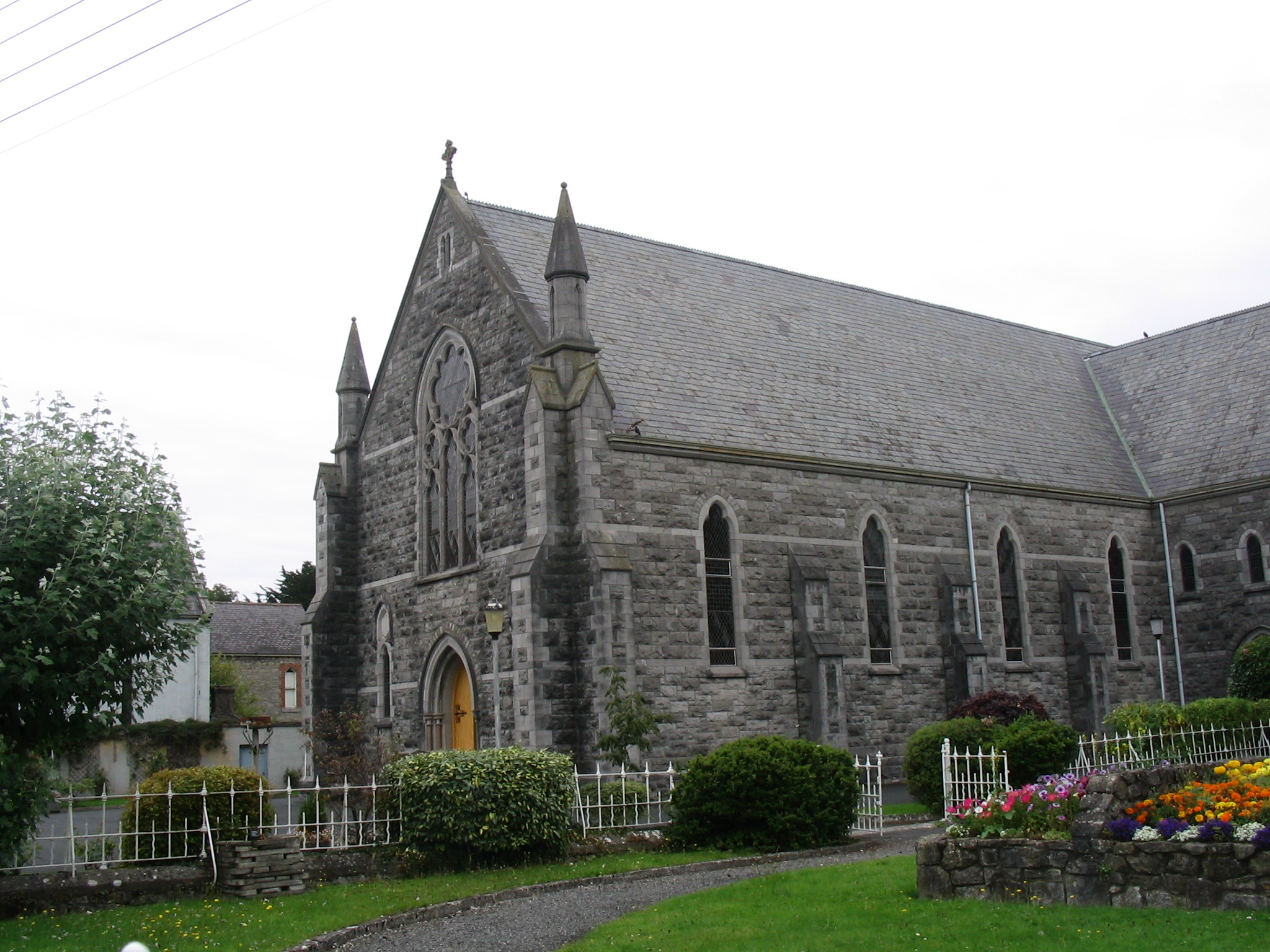
Stradbally have the most Junior B titles.

Year	Winner	Opponent
1972	Park	Ballyroan
1973	Mountmellick	Slieve Bloom
1974	Rathdowney	Durrow
1975	St Fintan's Hospital	The Heath
1976	Timahoe	Mountmellick
1977		
1978		
1979		
1980		
1981		
1982		
1983	Stradbally	Rosenallis
1984	Kilcavan	Courtwood
1985	Graiguecullen	
1986	Spink 1-09	Rosenallis 1-08
1987	Rosenallis	
1988	The Heath	Arles–Kilcruise
1989	Timahoe	St Fintan's, Colt
1990	Arles–Kilcruise	Ballylinan
1991	Ballyfin	Crettyard
1992	O'Dempsey's	The Heath
1993	Crettyard	Camross
1994	Castletown	Emo
1995	Arles–Kilcruise	St Fintan's, Mountrath
1996	St Fintan's, Mountrath	Ballylinan
1997	The Heath	Abbeyleix
1998	St Fintan's, Colt	Crettyard
1999	Abbeyleix	Stradbally
2000	Stradbally	Rathdowney
2001	Crettyard	Camross
2002	Portlaoise	Arles–Killeen
2003	Stradbally	Spink
2004	Spink 1-08	Castletown 1-07
2005	Camross 3-14	Emo 2-5
2006	Mountmellick	O'Dempsey's
2007	Ballylinan	O'Dempsey's
2008	The Rock	St Fintan's, Colt
2009	O'Dempsey's	St Fintan's, Colt
2010	Portlaoise	St Manman's
2011	Graiguecullen 1-9	St Fintan's, Colt 1-7
2012		
2013		
2014	Graiguecullen	
2015		
2016		
2017	Errill	
2018		
2019	Errill	
2020	Spink	Graiguecullen
2021		
2022	Camross 3-9	Errill 0-8
2022		
2024	Stradbally	Rosenallis
2025	Errill	Portarlington
2026	Portarlington	Castletown

Laois Junior C Football Championship
- Irish: Craobh Peil Sóisir C Laoise
- Founded: 1998
- Title holders: St Joseph's GAA (Laois) (1st title)
- Most titles: Portlaoise (3 titles)
- Sponsors: Laois Shopping Centre

== Laois Junior C Football Championship ==
The Laois Junior C Football Championship is an annual Gaelic football competition contested by fifth grade Laois GAA clubs. St Joseph's are the title holders (2024) defeating Courtwood in the Final.

An actor participated in the 2020 Junior C Championship.

=== List of finals ===
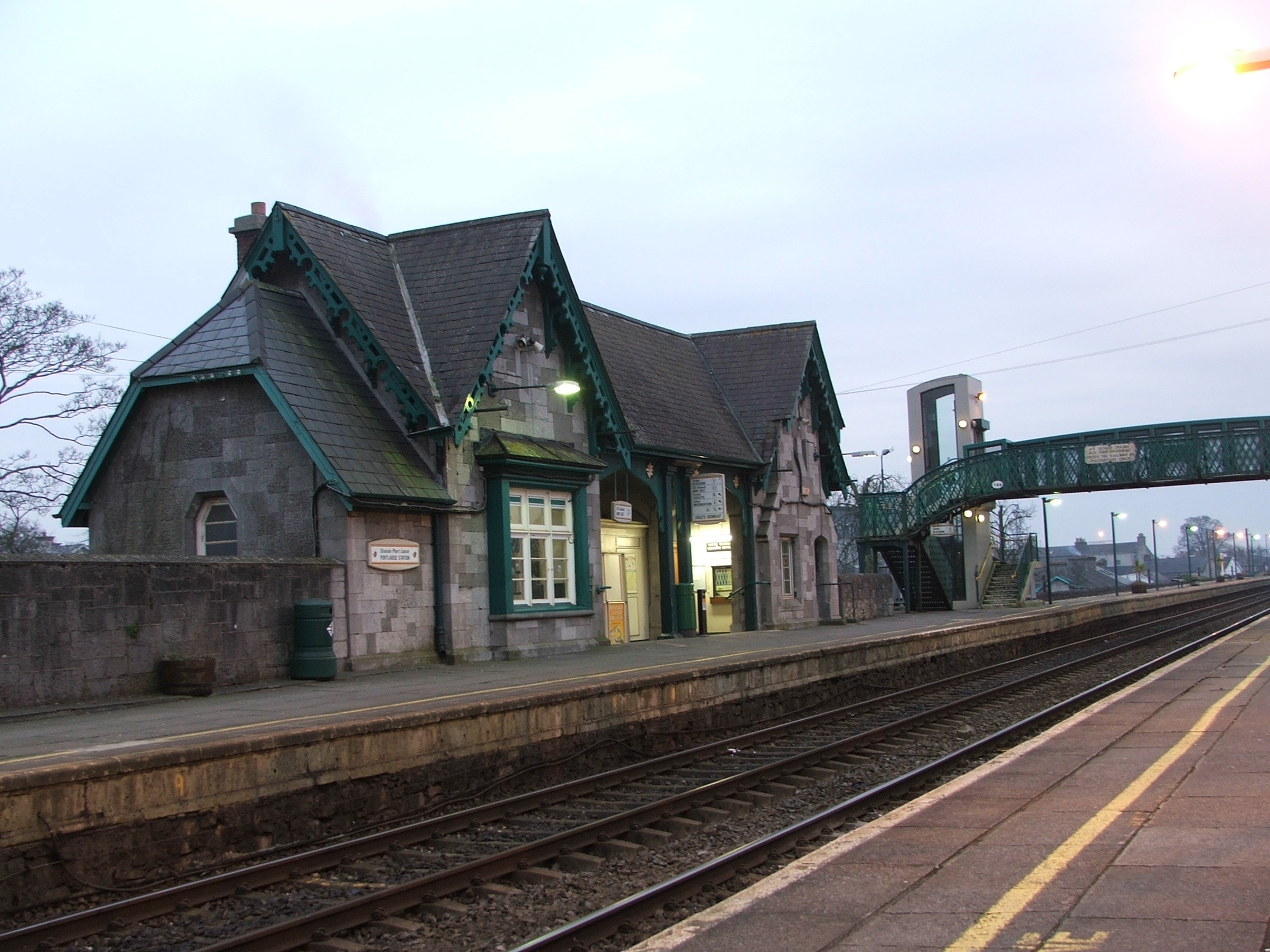
Portlaoise have the most Junior C titles.

(R) = Replay

Year	Winner	Opponent	Captain
1998	Rathdowney 1-11	Errill 0-05	Jim Doherty
1999	Clough–Ballacolla 2-08	Borris-in-Ossory 0-03	Pat Whelan
2000	Errill 2-07	Borris-in-Ossory 0-09	Paul Delaney
2001	The Harps 2-13	Kilcotton 0-05	Kevin Shortall
2002	Rosenallis 0-7, 1-9(R)	O'Dempsey's 0-7, 2-5(R)	Seán McKane
2003	Portlaoise 5-6	Arles–Kilcruise 1-6	Liam Browne
2004	Trumera 0-12	The Harps 2-3	John O'Connor
2005	Arles–Kilcruise 2-8	Shanahoe 2-6	Kevin Kealy
2006	Courtwood 0-13	The Heath 2-4	Stephen Wilson
2007	St Manman's 2-9	Ballyfin 0-3	Martin Fallon
2008	Portlaoise 2-10	Ballyfin 0-8	Paul Sutton
2009	Portlaoise 0-10, 1-11(R)	Shamrocks 1-7, 1-7(R)	Gary McCormack
2010	The Heath 1-13	Shamrocks 2-5	John Browne
2011	O'Dempsey's 0-14	Portlaoise 0-13	Pat Behan
2012	Slieve Bloom/Castletown 1-10	Camross 2-5	Martin Delaney
2013	Graiguecullen 2-16	Annanough 1-5	Donny Hurley
2014	Camross 1-10	Spink 0-7	Paul Delaney
2015	Rosenallis 2-9	Clonaslee 1-7	Tom Hyland
2016	Errill 2-6	Rathdowney GAA 1-6	Patrick Purcell
2017	Castletown 1-13	Rathdowney 1-6	John Gaughan
2018	Slieve Bloom 1-10	St Fintan's, Colt/ Clonad 1-7	John Lowry
2019	Graiguecullen 6-10	St Fintan's, Colt 1-5	Peter Branagan
2020	Kilcotton 3-8	St Fintan's, Colt 1-3	
2021	Ballyfin 0-11	Park–Ratheniska 0-9	
2022	Rathdowney 5-12	Courtwood 0-10	
2023	Clonaslee–St Manman's 0-10	Arles–Kilcruise 0-04	
2024	St Joseph's 1-08	Courtwood 0-08	
2025	Stradbally	Graiguecullen	
2026	Courtwood	O'Dempseys	
