= Laois Club Championships =

Competition

Laois GAA clubs contest Gaelic football and hurling competitions. There are both leagues and championships. From senior to under-age level.

== Hurling ==
=== Senior Hurling Championship ===
The Laois Senior Hurling Championship is the top level hurling competition in Laois.

=== Premier Intermediate Hurling Championship ===
The Laois Premier Intermediate Hurling Championship is the second level hurling competition in Laois.

=== Intermediate Hurling Championship ===
The Laois Intermediate Hurling Championship is the third level hurling competition in Laois.

=== Junior Hurling Championship ===
The Laois Junior Hurling Championships are the hurling competitions below second level in Laois.

- The Laois Junior A Hurling Championship is the fourth level hurling competition in Laois.
- The Laois Junior B Hurling Championship is the fifth level hurling competition in Laois.
- The Laois Junior C Hurling Championship is the sixth level hurling competition in Laois.

=== Under-21 Hurling Championship ===
The Laois Under 21 Hurling Championship is the highest level competition for under-21s.

=== Minor Hurling Championship ===
The Laois Minor Hurling Championship is the highest level competition for under-18s.

=== League ===
The Laois All-County Hurling League

== Football ==
=== Senior Football Championships ===
The Laois Senior Football Championship is the top level football competition in Laois.

=== Intermediate Football Championship ===
The Laois Intermediate Football Championship is the second level football competition in Laois.

=== Junior Football Championship ===
The Laois Junior Football Championships are the football competitions below second level in Laois.

- The Laois Junior A Football Championship is the third level football competition in Laois.
- The Laois Junior B Football Championship is the fourth level football competition in Laois.
- The Laois Junior C Football Championship is the fifth level football competition in Laois.

=== Under-21 Football Championship ===
The Laois Under 21 Football Championship is the highest level competition for under-21s.

=== Minor Football Championship ===
The Laois Minor Football Championship is the highest level competition for under-18s.

=== League ===
The Laois All-County Football League
