= Laois Intermediate Football Championship =

Annual football competition for intermediate clubs in Laois

- Irish: Craobh Peile Idir Mheain Laoise
- Founded: 1907
- Title holders: Kilcavan (1st title)
- First winner: Killenard
- Most titles: Clonaslee–St Manman's (6 titles)
- Sponsors: Laois Shopping Centre

The Laois Intermediate Football Championship is an annual Gaelic football competition contested by mid-tier Laois GAA clubs. The Laois County Board of the Gaelic Athletic Association has organised it since 1907.

Kilcavan are the title holders (2026), having defeated Ballyfin in the final to win their first ever intermediate title.

== Format ==
The Intermediate Championship has a 'back door' and operates similarly to the Senior Championship (and Junior Championship C only) by going for a straight knockout but the 'back door' is in place for anyone losing out.

The draw is first made for round 1 of the championship. The draw is then made for round 2 of the championship.

The final is held in O'Moore Park.

== Honours ==
The winners of the Laois Intermediate Championship qualify to represent their county in the Leinster Intermediate Club Football Championship. The winners can, in turn, go on to play in the All-Ireland Intermediate Club Football Championship. They often do well outside the county, with the likes of Ballyroan Abbey (2008) and Crettyard (2005) among the clubs from Laois to win at least one Leinster Championship after winning the Laois Intermediate Football Championship. Ballyroan Abbey are the only Laois GAA club to have played in Leinster finals at senior and intermediate, Galway GAA club St Michael's narrowly defeating them in the All-Ireland semi-final.

== History ==
It was first held in 1907, with Killenard the victors.

There was no championship in 1911, and none again from 1913 through 1917 and 1919 through 1933.

In the mid-1990s, Rosenallis won the Intermediate Championship straight after winning the Junior Championship, putting back-to-back titles together.

It was once the "Campion Sparrow Laois Intermediate Football Championship" for sponsorship reasons (as recently as 2012) but no more.

The 2017 final went to a replay before Emo got the better of Portlaoise.

During the pandemic year of 2020, the Laois Intermediate Football Championship achieved the distinction of being the only adult football championship completed in the county that year.

== List of finals ==
Year	Winner	Opponent
1907	Killenard	
1908	Abbeyleix	
1909	Ballyroan	
1910	Vicarstown	
1911	No competition	
1912	Rathdowney	
1913	No competition	
1914	No competition	
1915	No competition	
1916	No competition	
1917	No competition	
1918	Vicarstown	
1919	No competition	
1920	No competition	
1921	No competition	
1922	No competition	
1923	No competition	
1924	No competition	
1925	No competition	
1926	No competition	
1927	No competition	
1928	No competition	
1929	No competition	
1930	No competition	
1931	No competition	
1932	No competition	
1933	No competition	
1934	Abbeyleix	The Heath
1935	Ballybrittas	Clonad
1936	Annanough	Clonad
1937	Ballybrittas	Clonad
1938	Ballyadams	
1939	Portlaoise	
1940	Annanough	Worsted Mills
1941	Jamestown	
1942	Flemings Fireclay	The Heath
1943	The Heath	Mountmellick
1944	Ballylinan	Portarlington
1945	Portarlington	
1946	Annanough	Timahoe
1947	Park	
1948	Ballylinan	Timahoe
1949	Annanough	Barrowhouse
1950	Wolfhill	
1951	St Fintan's Hospital	
1952	O'Dempsey's	Mountmellick
1953	The Heath	
1954	Clonad	Jamestown
1955	Portarlington	Portlaoise
1956	Portlaoise	Barrowhouse
1957	Ballylinan	Barrowhouse
1958	Killeshin	Barrowhouse
1959	Stradbally	Fairymount
1960	St Fintan's Hospital	Portarlington
1961	Ballylinan	Kilcavan
1962	Timahoe	Kilcavan
1963	Stradbally	Emo
1964	Emo	Crettyard
1965	Crettyard	St Fintan's Hospital
1966	Ballyroan	Arles
1967	Arles	Mountmellick
1968	Mountmellick	St Fintan's Hospital
1969	St Joseph's	Portlaoise
1970	St Fintan's Hospital	Ballyroan
1971	Courtwood	Portarlington
1972	Portlaoise	Portarlington
1973	St Fintans Hospital	Mountmellick
1974	Killeshin	Ballyfin
1975	Portlaoise 0-12	Barrowhouse 1-8
1976	Crettyard	The Heath
1977	O'Dempsey's	Barrowhouse
1978	Annanough	Park
1979	Ballyroan	Barrowhouse
1980	Barrowhouse	Clonaslee–St Manman's
1981	Clonaslee–St Manman's	Park
1982	Portlaoise	Killeshin
1983	Stradbally	Killeshin
1984	Crettyard	The Rock
1985	Barrowhouse	The Rock
1986	The Heath	The Rock
1987	Courtwood	Portarlington
1988	Park–Ratheniska	Graiguecullen
1989	Spink	Portarlington
1990	Portarlington	The Harps
1991	Portarlington	The Harps
1992	Barrowhouse	Mountmellick
1993	Killeshin	The Rock
1994	The Harps	Mountmellick
1995	Rosenallis	The Rock
1996	The Rock	St Michael's
1997	Arles–Killeen 2-06	Arles–Kilcruise 0-10
1998	Clonaslee–St Manman's	Arles–Kilcruise
1999	Arles–Kilcruise	Courtwood
2000	Timahoe	Annanough
2001	Arles–Killeen	Annanough
2002	Clonaslee–St Manman's	Mountmellick
2003	Arles–Killeen	Ballyroan
2004	Timahoe	Mountmellick
2005	Crettyard	Courtwood
2006	Mountmellick 1-12	Annanough 1-06
2007	Graiguecullen	Courtwood
2008	Ballyroan Abbey	Park–Ratheniska
2009	Clonaslee–St Manman's	Killeshin
2010	Timahoe 0-15	Portlaoise 0-9
2011	Killeshin	Ballyroan Abbey
2012	Emo 2-12	Ballyroan Abbey 1-10
2013	Ballyroan Abbey 1-09	Clonaslee–St Manman's 0-06
2014	Ballyfin	Timahoe
2015	Clonaslee–St Manman's	Annanough
2016	O'Dempsey's 1-13	Timahoe 1-12
2017	Emo 3-06; 3-11 (R)	Portlaoise 1-12; 3-04 (R)
2018	Courtwood	Mountmellick Gaels
2019	Rosenallis	Clonaslee–St Manman's
2020	Clonaslee–St Manman's 1-13	Crettyard 1-10
2021	Park–Ratheniska	Mountmellick
2022	The Heath 1-13	Arles–Kilcruise 0-08
2023	Ballylinan	Crettyard
2024	Crettyard	Mountmellick
2025	Park–Ratheniska	Arles–Kilcruise
2025	Kilcavan	Ballyfin

== Wins listed by club ==
#	Club	Wins	Years won
1	Clonaslee–St Manman's	6	1981, 1998, 2002, 2009, 2015, 2020
2	Ballylinan	5	1944, 1948, 1957, 1961, 2023
2	Annanough	5	1936, 1940, 1946, 1949, 1978
2	Portlaoise	5	1939, 1956, 1972, 1975, 1982
2	Crettyard	5	1965, 1976, 1984, 2005, 2024
6	Timahoe	4	1962, 2000, 2004, 2010
6	Killeshin	4	1958, 1974, 1993, 2011
6	The Heath	4	1943, 1953, 1986, 2022
9	St Fintan's Hospital	3	1951, 1960, 1970
9	Barrowhouse	3	1980, 1985, 1992
9	Arles–Killeen	3	1997, 2001, 2003
9	Emo	3	1964, 2012, 2017
9	Courtwood	3	1971, 1987, 2018
9	O'Dempsey's	3	1952, 1977, 2016
15	Mountmellick	2	1968, 2006
15	Arles–Kilcruise	2	1967, 1999
15	Ballyroan Abbey	2	2008, 2013
15	Rosenallis	2	1995, 2019
15	Park–Ratheniska	2	1988, 2021
20	Jamestown	1	1941
20	Stradbally	1	1959
20	Wolfhill	1	1950
20	St Joseph's	1	1969
20	Spink	1	1989
20	The Harps	1	1994
20	The Rock	1	1996
20	Graiguecullen	1	2007
20	Ballyfin	1	2014
20	Kilcavan	1	2026
Rathdowney	1	1912	
