= Laois All-County Football League =

- Title holders: Courtwood (1st title)
- Sponsors: Laois Shopping Centre

The Laois All-County Football League (ACFL) is an annual Gaelic football competition contested by Laois GAA clubs. There are seven divisions and teams are promoted and relegated according to their league standing each year.

Prior to the inception of the All-County Football League, league competitions titled the Senior Football League, Intermediate Football League and Junior Football League were in place. These would have roughly equated to the current top three or four divisions in the ACFL.

The 2026 ACFL Division One winners were Courtwood who defeated St Joseph's in the final to win their first title.

The trophy for ACFL Division One is called the Rexie McDonald Cup.

== Roll of honour ==
=== Division One (formerly Senior Football League) ===
Year	Winner	Runner-up
2026	Courtwood	St Joseph's
2025	St Joseph's	Ballyroan Abbey
2024	St Joseph's	Courtwood
2023	Portarlington	St Joseph's
2022	St Joseph's	Graiguecullen
2021	Portarlington	Portlaoise
2020	No competition due to the impact of the COVID-19 pandemic on Gaelic games	
2019	Portlaoise	O'Dempsey's
2018	O'Dempsey's	St Joseph's
2017	O'Dempsey's	St Joseph's
2016	The Heath	St Joseph's
2015	Arles–Killeen	The Heath
2014	Portlaoise	Portarlington
2013	Graiguecullen	Arles–Killeen
2012	Portlaoise	Emo
2011	Portlaoise	Graiguecullen
2010	St Joseph's	Stradbally
2009	Portlaoise	Stradbally
2008	Portlaoise	O'Dempsey's
2007	Portlaoise	The Heath
2006	O'Dempsey's	The Rock
2005	Emo	The Heath
2004	Portlaoise	St Joseph's
2003	Arles–Kilcruise	St Joseph's
2002	Arles–Kilcruise	Stradbally
2001	St Joseph's	Portlaoise
2000	Ballylinan	St Joseph's
1999	Stradbally	Ballyroan
1998	Crettyard	Portlaoise
1997	Crettyard	Portlaoise
1996	Portlaoise	
1995	St Joseph's	O'Dempsey's
1994	League final unfinished	Title not awarded
1993	St Joseph's	Portarlington
1992	Ballyroan	Crettyard
1991	St Joseph's	Ballyroan
1990	O'Dempsey's	St Joseph's
1989	Portarlington	The Heath
1988	Portarlington	St Joseph's
1987	St Joseph's	The Heath
1986	Ballyroan	O'Dempsey's
1985	Ballyroan	St Joseph's
1984		
1983	Ballyroan	O'Dempsey's
1982	Annanough	O'Dempsey's
1981		
1980		
1979	Ballyroan	
1978	Portlaoise	The Heath
1977	Ballyroan	St Joseph's
1976	The Heath	St Joseph's
1975	Graiguecullen	Annanough
1974		
1973	Stradbally	Portarlington
1972	Emo	St Joseph's
1971	St Joseph's	Timahoe
1970	Timahoe	Emo
1969		
1968		
1967		
1966		
1965		
1964	Timahoe	Annanough

=== Division One "B" ===
Year	Winner	Runner-up
2022	Killeshin	Stradbally
2021	Emo	Arles–Killeen
2020	No competition due to the impact of the COVID-19 pandemic on Gaelic games	
2019	Ballylinan	Courtwood
2018	Ballyroan Abbey	Arles–Kilcruise
2017	Ballylinan	Portarlington

=== Division Two (formerly Intermediate Football League) ===
Year	Winner	Runner-up
2026	Portarlington	O'Dempsey's
2025	Arles–Killeen	Clonaslee–St Manman's
2024	The Heath	Emo
2023	Courtwood	Ballyfin
2022	Park–Ratheniska	Ballyfin
2021	Rosenallis	Mountmellick
2020	No competition due to the impact of the COVID-19 pandemic on Gaelic games	
2019	Clonaslee–St Manman's	Portlaoise
2018	Courtwood	St Joseph's
2017	Mountmellick	Courtwood
2016	Portlaoise	Annanough
2015	Timahoe	O'Dempsey's
2014	The Heath	Mountmellick
2013	Killeshin	Portarlington
2012	Ballyroan Abbey	Killeshin
2011	Portlaoise	Timahoe
2010	O'Dempsey's	Arles–Kilcruise
2009	Emo	Portarlington
2008	Stradbally	Ballylinan
2007	Crettyard	Timahoe
2006	Graiguecullen	Mountmellick
2005	Ballyroan	Stradbally
2004	Arles–Killeen	O'Dempsey's
2003	Crettyard	Killeshin
2002	Clonaslee–St Manman's	Killeshin
2001	Timahoe	Graiguecullen
2000	Emo	Mountmellick
1999	Ballylinan	Mountmellick
1998	Arles–Kilcruise	Graiguecullen
1997	The Rock	Timahoe
1996	St Michael's	Ballyfin
1995	Ballylinan	Ballyfin
1994	Park–Ratheniska	The Heath
1993	The Rock	Killeshin
1992	Barrowhouse	St Manman's
1991	Annanough	Spink
1990	St Manman's	Killeshin
1989	Spink	St Manman's
1988	Spink	St Manman's
1987	St Manman's	Killeshin
1986	Killeshin	Park–Ratheniska
1985		
1984		
1983	Stradbally	Crettyard
1982	Stradbally	The Rock
1981	St Manman's	Courtwood
1980	Crettyard	The Rock
1979	Ballyroan	St Joseph's
1978	Park–Ratheniska	
1977	Park	

=== Division Three (formerly Junior Football League) ===
Year	Winner	Runner-up
2026	Crettyard	Kilcavan
2025	Killeshin	Mountmellick
2024	Clonaslee–St Manman's	Kilcavan
2023	Mountmellick	Arles–Killeen
2022	Ballyroan Abbey	Annanough
2021	Ballyfin	Killeshin
2020	No competition due to the impact of the COVID-19 pandemic on Gaelic games	
2019	Ballyfin	The Rock
2018	The Heath	Portarlington
2017	Graiguecullen	O'Dempsey's
2016	Kilcavan	Barrowhouse
2015	Courtwood	O'Dempsey's
2014	Portlaoise	St Joseph's
2013	Ballyfin	Stradbally
2012	Barrowhouse	Spink
2011	Killeshin	Park–Ratheniska
2010	St Joseph's	Rosenallis
2009	The Heath	Graiguecullen
2008	Ballyfin	Annanough
2007	Barrowhouse	Park–Ratheniska
2006	Killeshin	Spink
2005	St Joseph's	Portlaoise
2004	The Heath	The Harps
2003	Kilcavan	Ballyroan
2002	Portlaoise	Portarlington
2001	Portarlington	Ballyfin
2000	Stradbally	Crettyard
1999	Portlaoise	Barrowhouse
1998	Clonaslee–St Manman's	Courtwood
1997	Ballyroan	Crettyard
1996	Arles–Kilcruise	Clonaslee–St Manman's
1995	Arles–Kilcruise	St Joseph's
1994	Ballyfin	The Harps

=== Division Three "B" ===
Year	Winner	Runner-up
2022	Graiguecullen	Rosenallis
2021	Ballyroan Abbey	Rosenallis

=== Division Four ===
Year	Winner	Runner-up
2026	Graiguecullen	Annanough
2025	Ballyroan Abbey	Ballylinan
2024	Graiguecullen	Portlaoise
2023	Kilcavan	Barrowhouse
2022	Emo	Arles–Kilcruise
2021	The Harps	Emo
2020	No competition due to the impact of the COVID-19 pandemic on Gaelic games	
2019	Portlaoise	Graiguecullen
2018	Rosenallis	Camross
2017	Ballyroan Abbey	O'Dempsey's
2016	Arles–Killeen	Mountmellick
2015	Killeshin	Graiguecullen
2014	Portarlington	Timahoe
2013	Killeshin	Ballylinan
2012	O'Dempsey's	Emo
2011	Portlaoise	Ballylinan
2010	Portlaoise	The Harps
2009	Graiguecullen	Clonaslee–St Manman's
2008	Arles–Killeen	O'Dempsey's
2007	Rosenallis	Mountmellick
2006	Barrowhouse	Graiguecullen
2005	Ballinakill	Arles–Kilcruise
2004	Colt	Spink
2003	Ballinakill	The Heath
2002	Timahoe	Courtwood
2001	Arles–Killeen	St Joseph's
2000	The Rock	Colt
1999	Stradbally	The Rock
1998	Abbeyleix	The Rock
1997	Mountrath	Portarlington
1996	Ballylinan	The Heath
1995	Arles	The Heath
1994	Timahoe	Portlaoise
1993		
1992		
1991	Ballyfin	Killeshin
1990	Ballyfin	Arles
1989	The Harps	Kilcavan
1988	Kilcavan	
1987	Ballinakill	Abbeyleix
1986	Spink	Ballyfin
1985	Timahoe	Castletown

=== Division Five ===
Year	Winner	Runner-up
2025	O'Dempsey's	Clonaslee–St Manman's
2025	Portarlington	O'Dempsey's
2024	Stradbally	The Heath
2023	Rosenallis	The Harps
2022	Park–Ratheniska	Kilcavan
2021	Ballyroan Abbey	Park–Ratheniska
2020	No competition due to the impact of the COVID-19 pandemic on Gaelic games	
2019	The Harps	Clonaslee–St Manman's
2018	Graiguecullen	St Joseph's
2017	Camross	Rosenallis
2016	Clonaslee–St Manman's	Crettyard
2015	Emo	O'Dempsey's
2014	The Rock	Ballyfin
2013	Kilcotton	Slieve Bloom/Castletown
2012	The Heath	Graiguecullen
2011	Killeshin	O'Dempsey's
2010	O'Dempsey's	Killeshin
2009	Mountmellick	Kilcotton
2008	Mountrath	Park–Ratheniska
2007	The Heath	Clonaslee–St Manman's
2006	Emo	Courtwood
2005	Shanahoe	Ballyfin
2004	The Harps	Trumera
2003	Clough–Ballacolla	Abbeyleix
2002	Camross	Errill
2001	Camross	Clough–Ballacolla
2000	Camross	
1999	Camross	Errill
1998	Errill	Mountmellick
1997	Colt	
1996		
1995		
1994	Ballyfin	
1993	Castletown	
1992	Camross	
1991	Camross	

=== Division Six ===
Year	Winner	Runner-up
2026	St Joseph's	Courtwood
2025	O'Dempsey's	St Joseph's
2024	Clonaslee–St Manman's	Park–Ratheniska
2023	Spink	O'Dempsey's

=== Division Seven ===
Year	Winner	Runner-up
2026	Crettyard	Annanough
2025	Courtwood	Graiguecullen
2024	St Joseph's	Courtwood
2023	Clonaslee–St Manman's	St Joseph's
