= ACFL =

ACFL may refer to:

- Atlantic Coast Football League, minor American football league that operated from 1962 to 1973
- Laois All-County Football League, an annual Gaelic football competition
