= Raheenabrogue GAA =

Former GAA club in County Laois, Ireland

Raheenabrogue
- Ráithín na mBróg
- County: Laois

Raheenabrogue GAA was a Gaelic Athletic Association gaelic football club near Abbeyleix in County Laois, Ireland.

The club was located in the catchment area of the current Ballyroan Abbey club.

Raheenabrogue won the Laois Senior Football Championship in 1901 and also reached the final of the championship in 1902, 1905, 1906 and 1924.

In 1906, Raheenabrogue actually won the county final in a replay by 1-3 to 0-4 against Maryborough but lost what would have been their second title on an objection.

According to the Laois GAA website "In the 1906 football final Raheenabrogue beat Maryborough 1-3 to 0-4 after a replay. Following an objection Maryborough was awarded the title. Raheenabrogue are listed in the records as champions but the evidence suggests that Maryborough are entitled to the honour. No Leinster Council minutes survive to confirm or deny an appeal against the County Board."

It is not known with any certainty when the club ceased to exist but in 1930, the club did not affiliate any team for the Laois championships.
