= The Rock GAA =

GAA club in County Laois, Ireland

- An Charraig
- Founded: 1970
- County: Laois
- Colours: Red and Black
- Coordinates: 53°06′56.56″N 7°17′38.65″W

Playing kits
Standard colours

The Rock GAA is a Gaelic Athletic Association gaelic football club based just outside the town of Mountmellick in County Laois, Ireland.

At adult level The Rock fields Football teams at Junior A and Junior C.

== History ==
The club was founded in 1970 and colours are red and black.

The club first entered the Laois Junior Football Championship in 1970, where in their first match they played against Emo and made an instant impact on the local GAA scene recording a win in their first outing.

The Rock won the Laois Junior Football Championship in 1979 defeating Ballinakill in the final, which was played in O'Moore Park. The captain was Noel Dunphy and vice-captain was John Deegan.

The Rock won the Laois Intermediate Football Championship in 1996 defeating St. Michaels in a replayed final in Stradbally. The captain was Leo Storey and the manager was Niall Tully.

The Rock competed in their first ever Senior Football Championship Final in 1998 where they suffered defeat to Stradbally on a scoreline of 0–8 to 0–5 on a day of atrocious weather conditions.

The Rock were relegated from the Senior Football Championship in 2013.

The Rock were relegated from the Intermediate Football Championship in 2022.

In 2011 and 2012, an Emo, Courtwood and The Rock minor combination won two Laois Minor "B" Football Championships and two Laois Minor Football League B titles.

In 2016, Emo, Courtwood and The Rock again joined forces at minor level and won the Laois Minor Football Championship.

== Underage setup ==
At underage level, The Rock field teams in the u13 grade in an amalgamation with Kilcavan, at u15, u17 and u20 they field teams with Kilcavan and Mountmellick forming Mountmellick Parish Gaels.

== Community ==
The Rock National School works closely with the club usually using its GAA facilities for P.E

== Achievements ==
Championship
Competition	Years won
Laois Intermediate Football Championship	1996
Laois Junior Football Championship	1979

League
Competition	Years won
Laois All-County Football League Div. 2	1993, 1997
Laois All-County Football League Div. 4	2000
Laois All-County Football League Div. 5	2014
