= Barrowhouse GAA =

GAA club in County Laois, Ireland

Barrowhouse
- Teach Bearbha/Teach na Bearú
- Founded: 1919
- County: Laois
- Nickname: The House
- Colours: Black and White
- Coordinates: 52°56′52.04″N 6°59′39.23″W

Playing kits
Standard colours

Barrowhouse GAA is a Gaelic Athletic Association club in Barrowhouse, County Laois, near Athy and the border with County Kildare. Founded in 1919, the club plays Gaelic football and has won the Laois Intermediate Football Championship three times and the Laois Junior A Football Championship four times. Its underage teams have also competed in amalgamations with neighbouring clubs.

== History ==
=== 1919–1959: Foundation and early championships ===
The club was established in 1919 in the Barrowhouse district of south-eastern County Laois, an area within the Catholic parish of Athy. Barrowhouse won its first county Junior A football title in 1927, beating Loughteague by four points in a final played in Stradbally in March 1928.

A second Junior A title followed in 1946. The championship was settled after objections arising from fixtures against Jamestown; the Laois GAA historical record states that the title was awarded to Barrowhouse. The same record uses the name Barrowvale in its roll of honour but Barrowhouse in its account of the final.

Barrowhouse reached the Intermediate championship final in 1949 but lost to Annanough. Four more final defeats followed in the 1950s: against The Heath in 1953, Portlaoise in 1956, Ballylinan in 1957 and Killeshin in 1958. Mick Phelan represented Laois in senior championship football from 1950 to 1962, while fellow Barrowhouse player Willie Malone made senior championship appearances between 1958 and 1960.

=== 1960–1989: Juvenile titles and the first Intermediate success ===
In 1971 Barrowhouse won the county Under-14 A and Under-16 A championships. Both finals were against Portlaoise: the Under-14 team won 5-3 to 1-2, and the Under-16 side won 2-6 to 0-9 after a replay. Kieran Whelan captained both teams. The Under-16 title is dated 1971 in the county final record and Portlaoise GAA archive; a later club centenary account gives 1972.

Barrowhouse won the Junior A championship again in 1974. Abbeyleix won the final on the field by 1-6 to 1-3, but Barrowhouse were awarded the title following a successful objection concerning player eligibility. The club returned to the Intermediate final in 1975, losing to Portlaoise, and was beaten in the finals of 1977 and 1979 by O'Dempsey's and Ballyroan respectively. By 1979 Barrowhouse had lost eight Intermediate finals.

The run ended in 1980 when Barrowhouse defeated Clonaslee–St Manman's by 2-10 to 1-6 in the Intermediate final. The winning team included Dom Whelan, Gerry Daly, Liam Langton, John Langton, Christy Langton and members of the Brennan family. Barrowhouse won the title for a second time in 1985, beating The Rock 0-5 to 0-4.

At underage level, the St Joseph's–Barrowhouse combined team won the 1987 county Under-17 championship, defeating Stradbally 2-11 to 1-5. The amalgamation also won the Under-16 B championship that year, beating St John's 4-12 to 0-5. The 1987 Under-16 B team record identifies Kieran Murphy, Alan Langton and Shay Phelan as Barrowhouse players.

=== 1990–2009: Championship and league football ===
St Joseph's–Barrowhouse finished as runners-up in the 1990 Under-21 A championship. Two years later, Barrowhouse won its third Intermediate championship, defeating Mountmellick 1-6 to 0-6 in the 1992 final. The club completed a double that year by winning Division 2 of the Laois All-County Football League, beating St Manman's 1-7 to 1-5. Dom Whelan captained the league-winning side.

In 1993 Barrowhouse players Brian Keville and Kevin Phelan were involved in Laois's Leinster Junior Football Championship-winning campaign. Laois went on to reach the All-Ireland Junior final, losing to Cork. Following a period in senior club football, Barrowhouse returned to the lower grades in the 1990s.

The St Joseph's–Barrowhouse amalgamation reached the 2003 Minor A final, losing to Portlaoise. Barrowhouse acquired land for its own grounds in 2004, having previously played on rented fields. The club's independent Under-14 B team was beaten by Portlaoise in the 2005 county final.

In 2006 Barrowhouse won Division 4 of the All-County Football League, defeating Graiguecullen 1-11 to 1-10, with Mike Langton as captain. The club also contested the county Junior A final that year, losing 1-13 to 0-8 against Park–Ratheniska. The St Joseph's–Barrowhouse underage side won the Minor B championship, beating Killeshin Gaels 3-10 to 1-9. Sean Langton and Emmet Malone, who also appear in Barrowhouse adult team records, were members of the winning side. The amalgamation won the Under-16 B league title that year.

Barrowhouse won the All-County Football League Division 3 title in 2007, beating Park–Ratheniska 2-8 to 1-8. That year, Barrowhouse players Donie Kingston and Ian Whelan were members of the Laois team that won the Leinster Minor Football Championship. Kingston also played in Laois's Leinster Under-21 championship final victory over Offaly.

In 2008 St Joseph's–Barrowhouse beat Stradbally Parish Gaels 2-5 to 0-8 to win the Laois Under-21 A title. Sean Langton, Emmet Malone and Joe Murphy are among the winning players also identified in contemporary Barrowhouse adult team records. The amalgamation won the Under-16 B championship that year and also took the Minor A league title. Work on the club's new grounds began in 2009.

=== 2010–2019: Further county titles and the centenary ===
St Joseph's–Barrowhouse won the Under-21 A championship again in 2011, beating Mountmellick–Ballyfin 1-13 to 0-9. Barrowhouse added another Division 3 league title in 2012, defeating Spink 2-11 to 1-11. In the same year, St Joseph's–Barrowhouse won the Under-17 A championship against Portlaoise, 0-12 to 1-8, and the Under-16 B title against St Paul's–The Rock, 1-11 to 1-8.

In 2013 the amalgamation won the Under-16 A championship and finished as runner-up in the Minor A championship. It also reached the 2014 Under-21 A final, losing to Sarsfields Gaels. The community walking track at Barrowhouse's grounds opened in March 2014.

Barrowhouse won the Junior A championship for the fourth time in 2015, beating The Heath 0-12 to 0-6, with Michael Langton as captain. Brian Daly received the Laois Junior Footballer of the Year award for that season while registered with Barrowhouse. St Joseph's–Barrowhouse also won the Under-21 A title in 2015, beating Portlaoise 2-10 to 1-5, and retained it in 2016 with a 2-16 to 0-10 victory over Sarsfields Gaels. The two winning sides included Barrowhouse players Brian Daly, James Baldwin and Andrew Baldwin. In January 2017, Daly was selected for Laois in the O'Byrne Cup while a Barrowhouse player; he transferred to St Joseph's later that year.

The club marked its centenary in 2019. In October, GAA president John Horan formally opened the first phase of the grounds development at Shanganamore. A book on the club's history was launched at a dinner dance in Carlow the following month.

=== 2020–2026: Recent seasons ===
Barrowhouse returned to the Junior A county final in 2021, losing to Ballyroan-Abbey 2-18 to 1-10 after extra time. The club was runner-up again in 2022, losing 1-11 to 0-8 to Portlaoise. Meanwhile, Barrowhouse underage players competed with Na Fianna Óg, an amalgamation involving Arles-Killeen and Arles-Kilcruise. The 2021 Under-20 B side also included Crettyard players and won that championship, defeating The Heath 2-11 to 2-10, and the 2022 Under-13 B championship against Camross, 6-12 to 2-6.

Na Fianna Óg won the Laois Féile football competition in 2024 and the county Under-15 B championship in 2025. Barrowhouse reached the 2025 Junior A final, losing 1-15 to 1-11 to Ballyroan-Abbey. It subsequently represented Laois in the Leinster Junior Club Football Championship and lost to St Brigid's Killashee of Longford in the opening round.

In 2026 Na Fianna Óg won the Under-15 Division 1B league and reached the county Minor A final. Barrowhouse's adult side reached the county Junior A semi-final in September, losing 1-15 to 2-5 against Timahoe.

== Honours ==
- Laois Intermediate Football Championship (3): 1980, 1985, 1992.
- Laois Junior A Football Championship (4): 1927, 1946, 1974, 2015.
- Laois All-County Football League Division 2 (1): 1992.
- Laois All-County Football League Division 3 (2): 2007, 2012.
- Laois All-County Football League Division 4 (1): 2006.

== Laois inter-county players ==
Mick Phelan (1950–1962), Willie Malone (1958–1960) and Kieran Whelan (1975) are recorded as Barrowhouse players in Laois senior championship appearances. Donie Kingston made his Laois senior championship debut in 2008 while registered with Barrowhouse. Brian Daly was selected for Laois in the O'Byrne Cup in January 2017 before transferring to St Joseph's later that year.

While playing with Barrowhouse, Donie Kingston won Leinster Minor and Under-21 football honours with Laois in 2007. Ian Whelan also appeared in the winning 2007 Leinster Minor final. Brian Keville and Kevin Phelan were members of Laois's 1993 Leinster Junior championship campaign. Brian Daly was named Laois Junior Footballer of the Year in 2015 while representing Barrowhouse.

== See also ==
- Laois GAA
- Laois Intermediate Football Championship
- Laois Junior Football Championship
