= Fairymount GAA =

Former GAA club in County Laois, Ireland

Fairymount
- County: Laois

Fairymount GAA is a former Gaelic football club near Newtown in County Laois, Ireland.

The club was located near the border between County Laois and County Kilkenny in the catchment area of the current Crettyard GAA club.

Fairymount won the Laois Junior Football Championship in 1952 and also reached the final of the Laois Minor Football Championship in 1957 where they were beaten by Annanough.

In 1959, Fairymount reached the final of the Laois Intermediate Football Championship only to be beaten by Stradbally, 1–6 to 0–5.
