= Jamestown GAA =

Former GAA club in County Laois, Ireland

Jamestown
- Baile Thadhg Dubh
- Founded: 1938
- County: Laois
- Colours: Green and White

Playing kits
Standard colours

Jamestown GAA was a Gaelic football club in Jamestown, County Laois, Ireland. The area now forms part of the catchment area of Courtwood GAA Club.

Andy Whelan, Stephen "Faun" Hughes and John Lalor were all Jamestown players who played in Laois's Leinster Senior Football Championship win of 1946.

Jamestown won three Laois Junior Football Championships in 1938, 1948 and 1953 and one Laois Intermediate Football Championship in 1941.

Following the formation of Courtwood club, the Jamestown club faded out of existence in the 1960s.
