= Kilcavan GAA =

Gaelic football club in County Laois, Ireland

Kilcavan
- Cill Chabháin
- Founded: 1946
- County: Laois
- Colours: Maroon and White
- Coordinates: 53°11′43.48″N 7°22′07.86″W

Playing kits
Standard colours

Kilcavan GAA is a Gaelic Athletic Association club in County Laois, Ireland. It fields Gaelic football teams in competitions organised by Laois GAA.

It is based just outside Clonaghadoo in County Laois, Ireland and provides Gaelic Football teams for people of the area.

At adult level Kilcavan fields Football teams at Senior and Junior C.

== History ==
Founded in 1946, the club colours are maroon and white. The club grounds are situated near the villages of Killeigh and Geashill which are on the other side of the County Offaly border.

Kilcavan has won one Laois Intermediate Football Championship (2026),five Laois Junior Football Championship titles (1960, 1993, 2004, 2013 and 2024) as well as the Laois Junior "B" Football Championship title in 1984. The club also won the Laois All-County Football League Division 3 title in 2003 and 2016.

== Juvenile setup ==
At underage level, Kilcavan field teams in the u13 grade in an amalgamation with The Rock, at u15, u17 and u20 they field teams with The Rock and Mountmellick forming Mountmellick Parish Gaels.

== Achievements ==
Championship
Competition	Years won
Laois Junior Football Championship	1960, 1993, 2004, 2013, 2024
Laois Junior B Football Championship	1984
Laois Intermediate Football Championship	2026

League
Competition	Years won
Laois All County Football League Division 3	2003, 2016
Laois All-County Football League Division 4	1988, 2023
