= Wolfhill GAA =

Former GAA club in County Laois, Ireland

Wolfhill
- Cnocán na Mac Tíre
- County: Laois
- Colours: Blue and White

Wolfhill GAA was a Gaelic football club in County Laois, Ireland.

The club was located in the catchment area of the current St Joseph's club.

Wolfhill won the Laois Senior Football Championship in 1896 and also reached the final of the championship in 1889 and 1897.

Wolfhill also won the Laois Junior Football Championship in 1920 and the Laois Intermediate Football Championship in 1950.

The St Joseph's club came into being in 1954. However, the Wolfhill club remained throughout the 50s and 60s and later became defunct in the 1970s due to the dwindling population through the fall of the coal mine industry which saw a lot of people leaving the area. The then already formed St Joseph's club was to be the final nail in Wolfhill coffin as success saw more and more adults and Juveniles switch blue and white for blue and yellow.

A soccer team now exists in the area with that club now carrying on the GAA teams former colours. The Laois County team took on Wolfhill's colours as Wolfhill rose to the top of Laois club football. Laois wear the blue and white of Wolfhill to this day
