= Spink, County Laois =

Village in County Laois, Ireland

Spink An Spinc
- Village
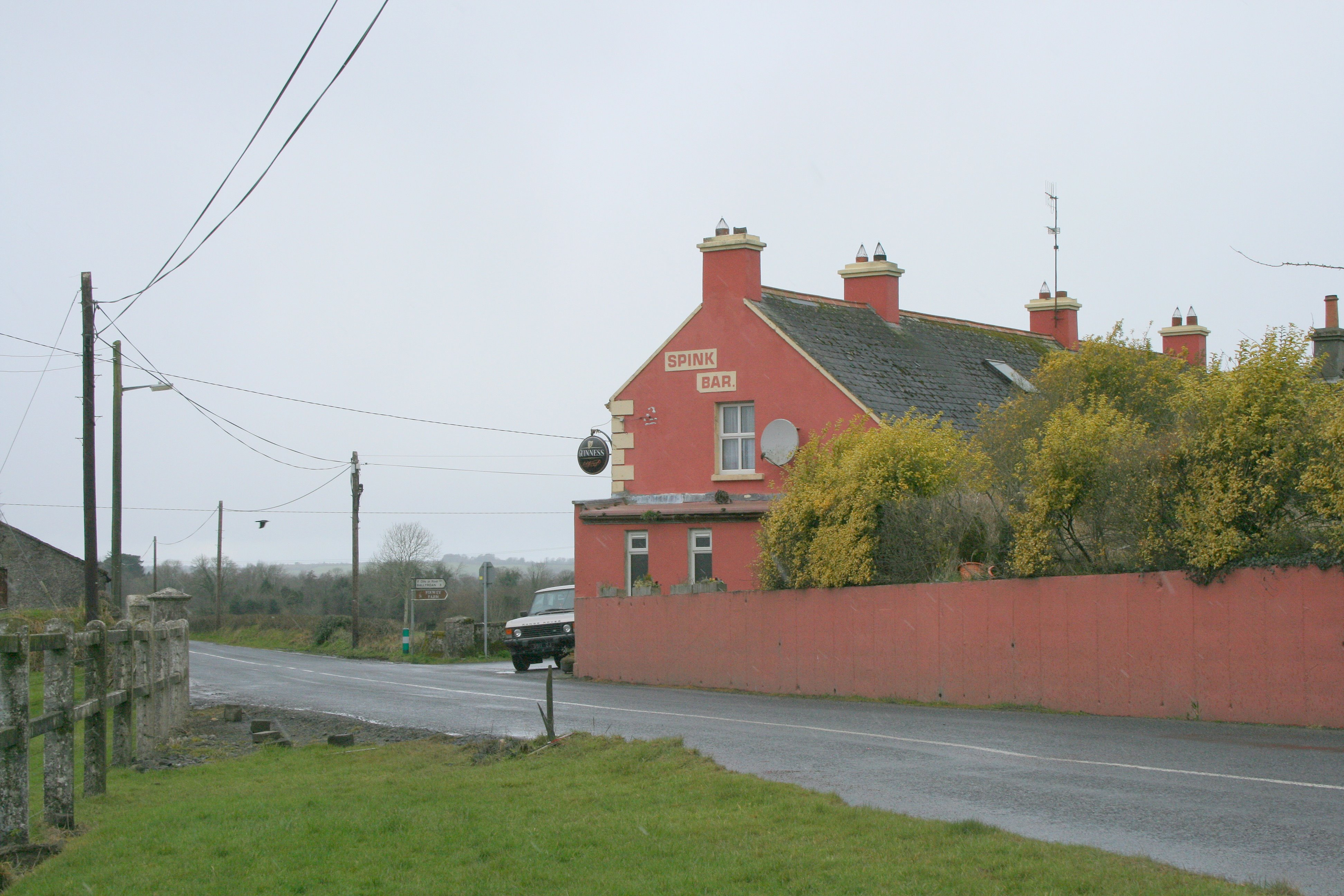
- Spink Bar on the R430 regional road

- Location in Ireland
- Coordinates: 52°54′N 7°14′W
- Country: Ireland
- Province: Leinster
- County: County Laois
- Time zone: UTC+0 (WET)
  - Summer (DST): UTC-1 (IST (WEST))

Spink (Irish: An Spinc, meaning 'the pointed rock') is a small village in County Laois, Ireland. It is situated near the Kilkenny border on the R430 regional road.

== Sports ==
Spink GAA is the local Gaelic Athletic Association club.

== Dispute ==
Residents from Spink are members of the prominent protest group, "Ratheniska, Timahoe, Spink (RTS) Substation Action Group" who have prevented the Electricity Supply Board from developing the power station in Coolnabacca, Ratheniska in a campaign that has been ongoing since 2009. In 2021, the ESB and the community group "hardened positions", and the ESB advised that if an offer of mediation from ESB and EirGrid, ″is not accepted by 27 August 2021, ESB and EirGrid will have no option but to consider its legal remedies against the Group.″ The group are concerned that the power station will be used to source power for all over the midlands and will have a significant impact on the local area.

== See also ==
- List of towns and villages in Ireland
