= Donnacha Hartnett =

Irish hurler

Donnchadh Hartnett
Personal information
- Native name: Donnchadh Ó hAirtnéada (Irish)
- Born: 1996 (age 29–30) Mountmellick, County Laois, Ireland

Sport
- Sport: Hurling
- Position: Right corner-back
Club
- Years: Club
- Rosenallis GAA
Club titles
- Laois titles: 0
College
- Years: College
- Cork Institute of Technology
College titles
- Fitzgibbon titles: 0
Inter-county
- Years: County
- 2017-present: Laois
Inter-county titles
- Leinster titles: 0
- All-Irelands: 0
- NHL: 0
- All Stars: 0

Donnchadh Hartnett (born 1996) is an Irish hurler who plays for Laois Senior Championship club Rosenalis and at inter-county level with the Laois senior hurling team. He usually lines out as a left corner-back.

== Honours ==
Mountmellick

- Laois Minor Hurling Championship (1): 2014
- Laois Junior B Hurling Championship (1): 2017
- Laois Junior Hurling Championship (1): 2018
- Laois Division 3 League (2): 2013,2017

Ballyfin Gaels (Mountmellick, Ballyfin, Emo)

- Laois Senior Hurling A Championship (1): 2017

Cork Institute Of Technology

- Fresher All-Ireland (1):15/16

Laois

- Joe McDonagh Cup (1): 2019
