= Mountmellick GAA =

GAA club in Mountmellick, County Laois, Ireland

- Móinteach Milic
- Founded: 1900
- County: Laois
- Nickname: The Valley
- Colours: Blue and white
- Grounds: Pairc Acragar
- Coordinates: 53°06′59″N 7°19′27″W

Playing kits
football	hurling

Senior Club Championships
	All Ireland	Leinster champions	Laois champions
Ladies' football:	–	3	9

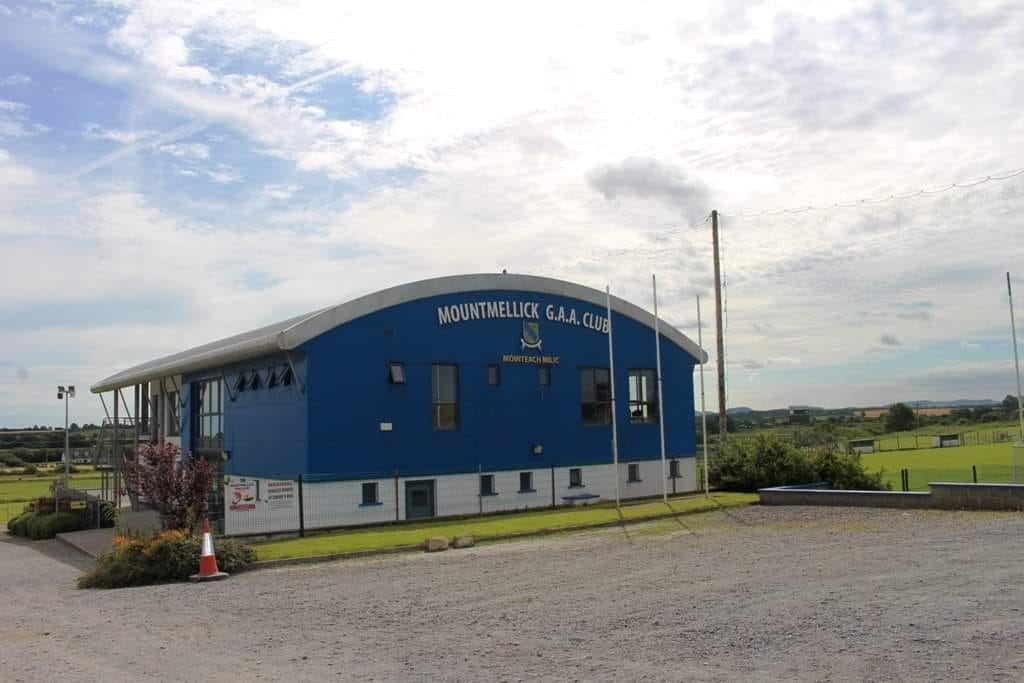
Mountmellick GAA clubhouse

Mountmellick GAA (Irish: Cumann Luthchleas Gael Móinteach Milic) is a Gaelic Athletic Association Gaelic Football and Hurling club in the town of Mountmellick in County Laois, Ireland. It fields teams in both football and hurling from juvenile up to adult.

At adult level, the club is a dual football and hurling club. Mountmellick field football teams at Intermediate and Junior B and Hurling Teams at Premier Intermediate and Junior C. Mountmellick is the only hurling club in the Mountmellick parish.

== History ==
The club's first Laois Intermediate Football Championship (IFC) title was won in 1968. In 2006, Mountmellick beat Annanough GAA to win the Laois IFC for the second time, after 38 years. They were relegated from the Senior Football Championship in 2017 and have competed in the Intermediate Football Championship since 2018.

Mountmellick has won the Laois Junior Football Championship five times, and the Laois Minor Football Championship twice, in 1975 and 1977.

Mountmellick has also won the Laois Intermediate Hurling Championship on two occasions.

The club's first Laois Intermediate Hurling Championship (IHC) title was won in 1967. In 2024, Mountmellick beat Abbeyleix to win the Laois IHC for the second time, after 57 years.

With five wins in the Laois Junior Hurling Championship. Mountmellick are the only Laois club to have won both Junior titles in the one year (1941). They came close to winning both Intermediate titles in one year (1967), winning the hurling and losing the football to Arles in a replay.

In 2019 Mountmellick reached the Intermediate Hurling Championship Semi-Final after winning the Junior B(2017) and Junior A(2018) in the last two years, they were defeated by Borris-in-Ossory Kilcotton after playing the second half with 14 men and missing a penalty.

In football they reached finals (2021, 2022), losing to Park–Ratheniska GAA.

In 2022 they lost the intermediate hurling final to Clough–Ballacolla GAA.

== Juvenile setup ==
At underage level, Mountmellick field teams in hurling from u11 up to u17 and u20.

In football Mountmellick field their own teams up to u13, at u15, u17 and u20 they field teams with Kilcavan and The Rock forming Mountmellick Parish Gaels.

== Championship honours ==
=== Football ===
Competition	Years won	
Laois Intermediate Football Championship	1968, 2006	
Laois Junior Football Championships	1921, 1929, 1941, 1966, 1972	
Laois Junior B Football Championship	1973, 2006	
Laois Under-21 Football Championship	1996, 2012*, 2014*	* Denotes as part of Sarsfields or Sarsfields Gaels (Mountmellick, Ballyfin, Kilcavan)
Laois Under-21 B Football Championship	2003	
Laois Under-20 B Football Championship	*2023	*Denotes as part of Mountmellick Parish Gaels(Mountmellick, The Rock, Kilcavan)
Laois Minor Football Championship	1975, 1977	

=== Hurling ===
Competition	Years won	
Laois Intermediate Hurling Championship	1967, 2024	
Laois Junior Hurling Championship	1930, 1935, 1941, 1961, 2001, 2018	
Laois Junior B Hurling Championship	1998, 2012, 2017	
Laois Junior C Hurling Championship	2017	
Under-21 A Hurling Championship	1991, 1992	
Laois Minor Hurling Championship	1966, 2014*	*part of na fianna (Mountmellick, Ballyfin, Clonaslee)
Laois Minor B Hurling Championship	1991, *2021	*part of na fianna(Mountmellick, Ballyfin, Clonaslee)

== Notable players ==
- John O'Loughlin
- Donnacha Hartnett

== Managers ==
Hurling

Years	Name
2022-2025	Damien Carter
2021	James Young
2020	Fergal Cuddy
2019	Matty Mahon
2017-2018	Chris Hartnett

Football

Year	Name
2023-2025	Colm Coss
2021-2022	Gordon Lalor
2020	Paddy Marsh

== Ladies Football ==
Ladies football in the area is catered for by Sarsfields Ladies Football Club.
