= Spink GAA =

Gaelic football club in Spink, County Laois, Ireland

- Spinc
- County: Laois
- Colours
- Coordinates: 52°54′24.16″N 7°16′03.24″W

Playing kits
Standard colours

Spink Gaelic Athletic Association Club is a gaelic football club in Spink, County Laois, Ireland.

The club is located in the parish of Ballinakill on the main Abbeyleix to Carlow road. The club colours are green and red.

== Honours ==
- Laois Junior Football Championships (3) 1944, 1987, 2011
- Laois Intermediate Football Championship (1) 1989
- Laois Junior B Football Championship (2) 1986, 2004
- Laois All-County Football League Division 2: (2) 1988, 1989
- Laois All-County Football League Division 4: (1) 1986
- Laois All-County Football League Division 6: (1) 2023

== Notable players ==
Spink was represented on the Laois Under 21 football team by goalkeeper John Dunphy in 2010 and 2011.
