= Jamestown, County Laois =

Village in County Laois, Ireland

Coordinates: 53.1161°N 7.1081°W

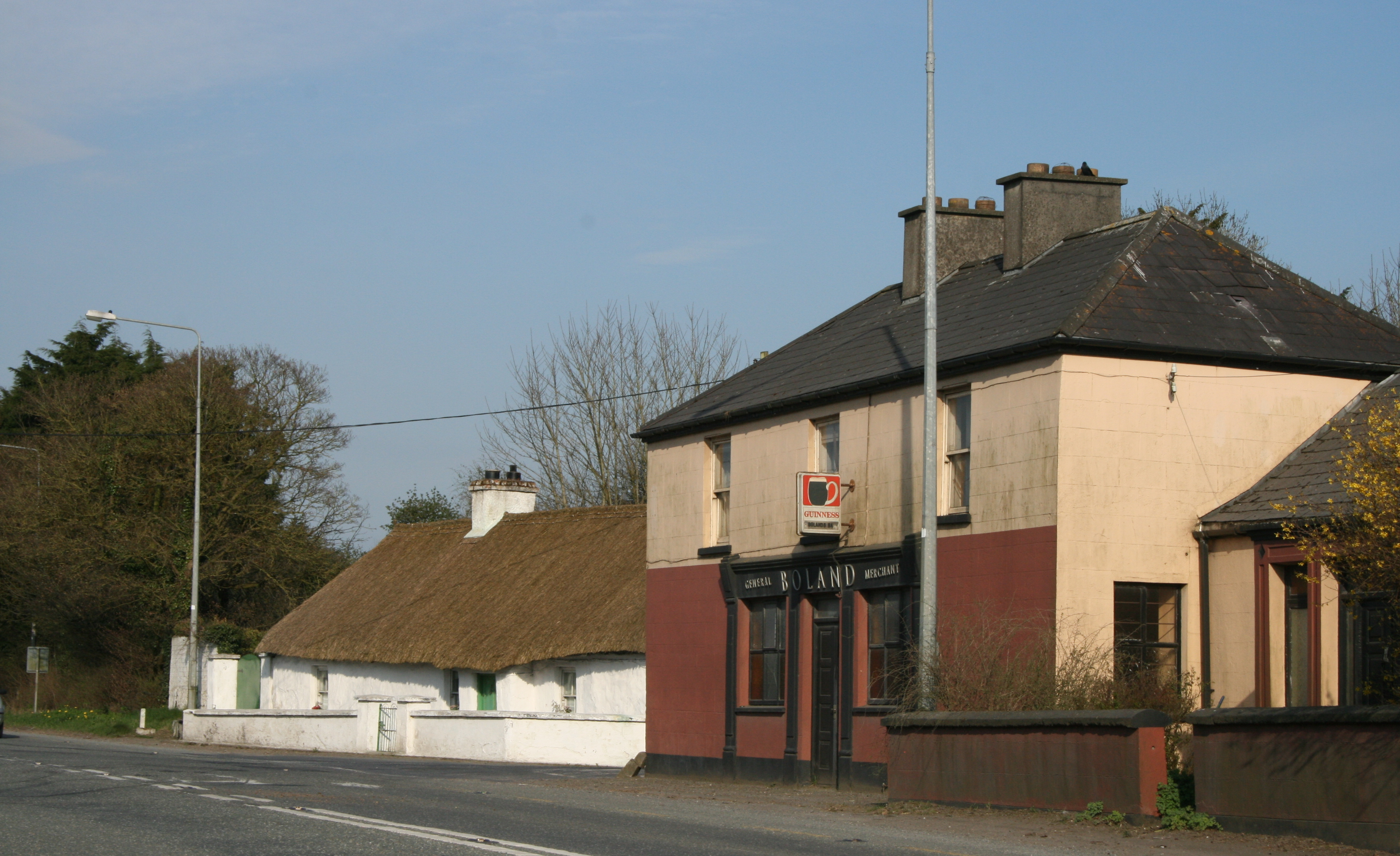
Cottage and closed pub on a junction with the R445 regional road

Jamestown or Ballyteigduff (Irish: Baile Thaidhg Dhuibh, meaning 'Bblack Tadhg's town') is a small village on a crossroads between Ballybrittas in County Laois and Monasterevin in County Kildare, in Ireland.

The local Gaelic football team, Jamestown GAA, existed in Jamestown during the middle of the 20th century before fading out of existence in the 1960s.
