= Ballylinan =

Town in County Laois, Ireland

Ballylinan Baile Uí Laigheanáin
- Town
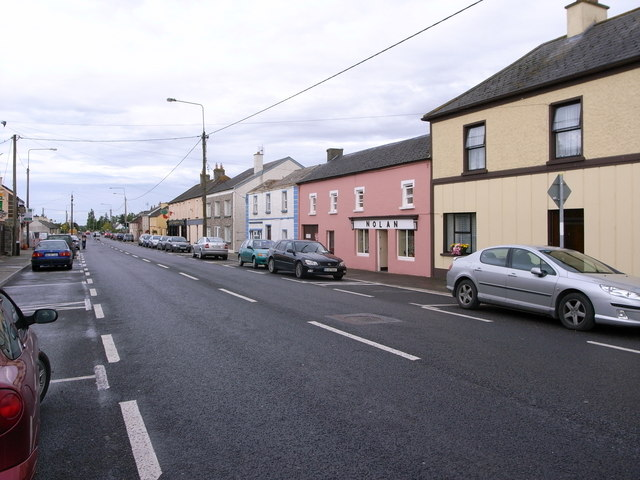
- Main Street

- Location in Ireland
- Coordinates: 52°56′37″N 7°02′32″W
- Country: Ireland
- Province: Leinster
- County: County Laois

Population (2022)
  - Total: 1,167
- Time zone: UTC+0 (WET)
  - Summer (DST): UTC-1 (IST (WEST))
- Irish Grid Reference: S644885

Ballylinan or Ballylynan (Irish: Baile Uí Laigheanáin) is a town in County Laois, about 3 kilometres (1.9 mi) from the border with County Kildare in Ireland. The name means "Lynan's town", though exactly who Lynan was is now forgotten.

== Transport ==
A 12-mile railway line linking Ballylinan to the nearby towns of Athy, County Kildare and Wolfhill, County Laois was opened in September 1918 by the British government during WW1 to aid the supply of coal. It was closed at the end of 1929 but the section connecting Ballylinan to Athy was retained for sugar beet traffic until 1963, when it was fully closed. Some of the trackbed still exists around the Athy area.

== Development and amenities ==
Historical population
Year	Pop.	±%
1991	431	—
1996	406	−5.8%
2002	430	+5.9%
2006	754	+75.3%
2011	1,084	+43.8%
2016	1,101	+1.6%
2022	1,167	+6.0%

Ballylinan is mainly a farmland area with no significant industrialisation, although the building of a number of housing developments has mirrored an increase in the area's population. In the 14 years between the 2002 and 2016 census, the population of the town increased nearly three-fold, from 430 people to 1,101 inhabitants.

The town has a number of shops, a church, a Garda (police) station, school, garage, park, Pharmacy (just opened), and pub. Most of these are on the one road, the N78.

The National Ploughing Association is based in Ballylinan.

== Sport ==
Ballylinan GAA is the local Gaelic football club.

== People ==
- William Russell Grace (1832–1904), the first Roman Catholic mayor of New York and the founder of W. R. Grace and Company, was born in Ballylinan.

== See also ==
- List of towns and villages in Ireland
