= Ballyroan Abbey GAA =

GAA club in County Laois, Ireland

Ballyroan Abbey
- Beal Atha an Roine - Mainistir
- Founded: 2007
- County: Laois
- Colours: Sky Blue and Navy
- Grounds: Glenbrooke
- Coordinates: 52°56′36.83″N 7°17′37.98″W

Playing kits
Standard colours

Ballyroan Abbey GAA is a Gaelic Athletic Association gaelic football club in County Laois, Ireland.

== History ==
The original Ballyroan GAA club was founded in 1887. The club colours were originally royal blue with a dominant white V on the front, later being changed to sky blue and navy.

The Ballyroan GAA club won eight Laois Senior Football Championship titles in its own right, the most recent of which was in 1992.

Ballyroan Gaels was a temporary amalgamation of the two neighbouring clubs, Abbeyleix and Ballyroan. This amalgamation was made permanent in 2007, when they became known as Ballyroan Abbey GAA. This was also a year of great surprise, when they lost to The Heath in a relegation play-off game meaning they would take part at intermediate rather than senior level in 2008.

However, 2008 saw the club make a swift return to senior ranks with a 1-12 to 0-10 win over Park/Ratheniska in the final of the Laois Intermediate Football Championship . By December of the same year, the Leinster Intermediate Club Football Championship had been added, with a win over Meath champions St Ultans in the final. In the 2009 season, the club skirted relegation with the lowest point being a loss to Crettyard in Laois Senior Football Championship before holding on to beat The Rock in that year's relegation playoff.

However, 2010 saw the club impacted by injuries and transfers and they were relegated from senior ranks after four successive championship defeats.

In 2014, the club again returned to senior football having won the 2013 Laois Intermediate Football Championship. It was their third attempt in a row to win a final and this time they came out on top.

== Achievements ==
- Laois Intermediate Football Championship (2) 2008, 2013
- Leinster Intermediate Club Football Championship: (1) 2013
- Laois All-County Football League Div. 2: (1) 2012
- Laois All-County Football League Div. 4: (1) 2017

== Notable players ==
- Padraig McMahon
- MJ Tierney
