= Arles–Kilcruise GAA =

GAA club in County Laois, Ireland

Arles–Kilcruise
- Ard Lios
- Founded: 1960
- County: Laois
- Colours: Maroon and White
- Coordinates: 52°53′42.09″N 7°01′32.31″W

Playing kits
Standard colours

Senior Club Championships
	All Ireland	Leinster champions	Laois champions
Football:	-	-	1

Arles–Kilcruise GAA Gaelic Athletic Association Club is a gaelic football club in County Laois, Ireland.

Founded in October 1960, the club colours are maroon and white.

The club won its only Laois Senior Football Championship title to date in 2003 under the captaincy of Paudge Conway.

Arles won the Laois Junior Football Championship in 202 and followed up with the intermediate title two years later.

From Under 12 to Under 21 the club's players play with Na Fianna Óg

== Achievements ==
- Laois Senior Football Championships: (1) 2003
- Laois All-County Football League Div 1: (2) 2002, 2003
- Laois Intermediate Football Championships: (2) 1967, 1999
- Laois Junior Football Championships: (1) 1965

== Notable players ==
- Chris Conway
- David Conway
- John Conway
- Kevin Meaney
- Ross Munnelly
