= Ballyfin GAA =

GAA club in Ballyfin, County Laois, Ireland

- Baile Fionn
- County: Laois
- Colours: Green and White
- Grounds: Cappinrush
- Coordinates: 53°03′26.67″N 7°24′19.70″W

Playing kits
Standard colours

Ballyfin GAA is a Gaelic Athletic Association hurling and gaelic football club located in the village of Ballyfin in County Laois, Ireland.The club colours are green and white. The club grounds are at Cappinrush, beside Ballyfin's Roman Catholic church.

Ballyfin have won the Laois Intermediate Hurling Championship on 3 occasions; in 1970 defeating Ballinakill, in 1985 defeating Clonaslee and most recently in 2006 defeating Colt. Prior to their 1970 win, in 1967 Ballyfin defeated traditional rivals Clonaslee in the Laois Junior Hurling Championship final to gain promotion to the intermediate ranks. In 1972 they made their one and only appearance in the Laois Senior Hurling Championship final, losing out to Borris-in-Ossory. In 2005 Ballyfin captured the Laois Under 21 "B" Hurling Championship, defeating Abbeyleix-Ballypickas at O'Moore Park.

Ballyfin, in addition to competing at intermediate level, also field a junior B hurling team. This is courtesy of their 1999 final victory over Ballylinan in the Laois Junior "C" Hurling Championship. Ballyfin also have gaelic football teams and compete in the senior and junior C grades.

Ballyfin's rise in football was started in the late 1980s when the team progressed from division five to division one. In 1995 Ballyfin won the Laois Junior Football Championship beating Ballyroan in the final and again lifted the trophy in 2010 after a narrow win over Spink in the final. In 2001 and 2004, they won the Laois Under 21 "B" Football Championship. In 2008 and 2013 they won the Laois All-County Football League Division 3 title. In 2014, Ballyfin defeated Timahoe in the final to win their first Laois Intermediate Football Championship title and gain senior status in football for the first time in 2015.

Laois senior football player James Finn is a member of the club, as is Oliver Phelan who managed Laois to their 1996 All-Ireland Minor Football Championship.

== Achievements ==
- Laois Senior Hurling Championships: Runner-Up 1972
- Laois Premier Intermediate Hurling Championship: 2025
- Laois Intermediate Hurling Championship: (3) 1970, 1985, 2006
- Laois Junior Hurling Championships: (1) 1967
- Laois Junior B Hurling Championships: (1) 1999
- Laois Under-21 B Hurling Championships (1) 2005
- Laois Intermediate Football Championships: (1) 2014
- Laois Junior Football Championships: (2) 1995, 2010
- Laois Junior C Football Championships: (1) 2021
- Laois Under-21 B Football Championships (2) 2001, 2004
- Laois All-County Football League Div. 3: (5) 1993, 2008, 2013, 2019, 2021
- Laois All-County Football League Div. 4: (2) 1990, 1991
- Laois All-County Football League Div. 5: (1) 1995
