= Ballyroan GAA =

Former GAA club in County Laois, Ireland

Ballyroan Abbey
- Beal Atha an Roine
- Founded: 1887
- County: Laois
- Colours: Sky blue and navy blue

Playing kits
Standard colours

Senior Club Championships
	All Ireland	Leinster champions	Laois champions
Football:	-	-	8

Ballyroan Abbey GAA was a Gaelic football club in Ballyroan, County Laois, Ireland.

Founded in 1887, the club colours were sky blue and navy, originally having been royal blue with a dominant white V on the front. The club won eight Laois Senior Football Championship titles, the most recent of which was in 1992.

It also won the second ever Laois Junior A Football Championship in 1907.

In 2006, a number of Ballyroan players were part of the Ballyroan Gaels squad that won the Laois Senior Football Championship. Ballyroan Gaels was an amalgamation of the two neighbouring clubs, Abbeyleix GAA and Ballyroan.

In 2007 the two clubs joined together to form the new Ballyroan Abbey GAA club. The existing Abbeyleix GAA club now solely plays hurling. Ballyroan Abbey still exists today.

== Achievements ==
- Laois Senior Football Championship: (9) 1890, 1914, 1915, 1917, 1943, 1948, 1950, 1992
- Laois All-County Football League Div. 1: (6) 1977, 1979, 1983, 1985, 1986, 1992
- Laois All-County Football League Div. 2: (1) 2005
- Laois All-County Football League Div. 3: (1) 1997
