= Killeshin GAA =

GAA club in Killeshin, County Laois, Ireland

Killeshin
- Gleann Uisean
- Founded: 1921
- County: Laois
- Colours: Green and White
- Grounds: Seamus Hearns Park/Pairc Uisean
- Coordinates: 52°51′16.04″N 6°59′52.30″W

Playing kits
Standard colours

Killeshin GAA is a Gaelic Athletic Association football club in the village of Killeshin, County Laois, Ireland.

The club colours are green and white and the club grounds, which are near the Laois-Carlow border, are called Seamus Hearns Park/Pairc Uisean. In 2019, Killeshin reached their first-ever Senior County final.

Killeshin have never won the Laois Senior Football Championship title but they have won the Laois Intermediate Football Championship four times (1958, 1974, 1993 and 2011) and the Laois Junior Football Championship four times (1957, 1969, 1981 and 2008).

The club won season four of RTÉ's Celebrity Bainisteoir in 2011, with ex-Ireland soccer star Tony Cascarino as their manager.

== Achievements ==
- Laois Intermediate Football Championship: (4) 1958, 1974, 1993, 2011
- Laois Junior Football Championships (4) 1957, 1969, 1981, 2008
- Laois All-County Football League Division 2: (2) 1986, 2013
- Laois All-County Football League Division 3: (5) 1979, 1980, 1981, 2006, 2011
- Laois All-County Football League Division 4: (2) 2013, 2015
- Laois All-County Football League Division 5: (1) 2011

== Notable players ==
- Stephen Attride
- Eoin Lowry
- Liam Doran Snr
- Luke Kehoe
