= Annanough GAA =

GAA club in County Laois, Ireland

- Áth na nEach
- Founded: 1920
- County: Laois
- Colours: Blue and Gold
- Grounds: Annanough
- Coordinates: 53°03′05.99″N 7°05′25.16″W

Playing kits
Standard colours

Senior Club Championships
	All Ireland	Leinster champions	Laois champions
Football:	-	-	5

Annanough GAA is a Gaelic football club in Vicarstown, County Laois, Ireland.

== History ==
Annanough was founded in 1920 from a merger of the old Vicarstown and Moyanna clubs. Moyanna had won the 1891 Laois Senior Football Championship title while Vicarstown were Laois Intermediate Football Championship winners in 1917 and 1919. Success wasn't long coming the new club's way with the legendary Dick Miller captaining Annanough to a three-in-a-row of Laois Senior Football Championship titles from 1924 to 1926.

Another great Annanough team emerged in the 1950s to take two more Laois Senior Football Championship titles. Names like the Nerneys, Dunnes, Terry O’Connell, Ronan Donlan, Tom Gorman, the Murphys and of course the Millers backboned both club and county team at this time. Annanough went back to intermediate ranks before a Martin Stapleton captained side captured the 1978 Laois Intermediate Football Championship title with a 2–9 to 1–4 win over Park.

The 1980s saw Annanough resume their place as a football power within Laois, although the ultimate honour of a Laois Senior Football Championship victory eluded them, with the 1982 side particularly unlucky to meet a Portlaoise side in the final, and Portlaoise went on to win the All-Ireland club championship. That was the only defeat suffered by Annanough in 82, when they did win the senior league, with John Nerney as captain.

1996 saw Annanough return to intermediate ranks and after the ill-fated Annawood senior amalgamation with Courtwood, the elusive sixth Laois Intermediate Football Championship title remains the goal of this proud club.

2018 saw the club win its first championship title in 40 years when they defeated O'Dempsey's to win the Laois Junior Football Championships for the first time ever.

== Honours ==
- Laois Senior Football Championship: 6
  - 1891 Moyanna 0-4, Portarlington 0-2 (Captain: Frank Foley)
  - 1924 Annanough 1-2, Ratheenabrogue 0-1 (Captain: Dick Miller)
  - 1925 Annanough 4-2, Ballyroan 0-5 (Captain: Dick Miller)
  - 1926 Annanough 1-2, Abbeyleix 0-0 (Captain: Dick Miller)
  - 1951 Annanough 3-4, Portarlington 1-3 (Captain: Fran Nerney)
  - 1956 Annanough 0-14, Park 0-5 (Captain: Tom Gorman)
- Laois Intermediate Football Championship: 5
  - 1936 Annanough 0-10, Clonad 0-8 (Captain: Tom Dunne)
  - 1940 Annanough 1-5, Worsted Mills 1-3 (Captain: Matt Dunne)
  - 1946 Annanough 0-7, Timahoe 0-2
  - 1949 Annanough 6-8, Barrowhouse 1-5 (Captain: Fran Nerney)
  - 1978 Annanough 2-9, Park 1-4 (Captain: Martin Stapleton)
- Laois Junior Football Championships:1
  - 2018 Annanough 0-12 O'Dempsey's 0-10 (Captain: Shane Stapleton)
  - 2023 Annanough 3-6 The Harps 1-3
- 1968: Annanough, as part of the parish trio of Annanough, Stradbally and Timahoe, and that year under the name of Annanough, completed a three in a row of Under 21 championship wins, though the third win was without the Stradbally element. St Joseph's were the opposition on final day.

== Notable players ==
- Terry O'Connell, played for Laois and Leinster and was an hour away from a Leinster Senior Football Championship medal in 1959
