= Ballylinan GAA =

GAA club in Ballylinan, County Laois, Ireland

Ballylinan
- Baile Uí Laighneáin
- Founded: 1926
- County: Laois
- Nickname: The Village
- Colours: Green and Gold
- Grounds: Aughanure
- Coordinates: 52°56′20.18″N 7°02′21.06″W

Playing kits
Standard colours

Ballylinan GAA is a Gaelic Athletic Association Gaelic football club in Ballylinan, County Laois, Ireland. The club was founded in 1926 and has colours of green and gold.

Ballylinan Gaelic Athletic Association Club has been a central part of village life since it was founded in 1926. The club is a senior club which provides Gaelic football to all age groups from under six to adult. The club also formerly competed in the Laois Junior Hurling Championship.

Ballylinan has won the Laois Intermediate Football Championship title five times and in 1987 and 2017 reached the Laois Senior Football Championship final, losing to Portlaoise both times.

The club also works very closely with its ladies' football club, St Brigid's, who provide ladies' football for girls from under-12 to adult.

The Club Grounds are located at Aughanure, Ballylinan

Mick Lillis succeeded Niall Carew as manager ahead of the 2020 season.

== Achievements ==
- Laois Intermediate Football Championships: (5)
- Laois All-County Football League Division 1: (1) 2000
- Laois All-County Football League Division 1B: (2) 2017, 2019
- Laois All-County Football League Division 2: (2) 1995, 1999
- Laois All-County Football League Division 4: (1) 1996
