= Arles–Killeen GAA =

GAA club in County Laois, Ireland

Arles–Killeen
- Ard Lios–Cillín
- Founded: 1961
- County: Laois
- Nickname: Arles
- Colours: White with black trim
- Grounds: San Siro
- Coordinates: 52°53′34.99″N 6°59′45.06″W

Playing kits
Standard colours

Arles–Killeen GAA is a Gaelic football club in County Laois, Ireland.

Founded in 1961 the club colours are white with black trim.

The club has won 3 Laois Intermediate Football Championships and in 2006 reached the Laois Senior Football Championship final where they were beaten by Ballyroan Gaels. In 2013 and 2014 they again reached the Laois Senior Football Championship final but were beaten on both occasions by Portlaoise.

Laois senior players Donal Kingston and Paul Kingston and former Laois players Brian McDonald, Donal Brennan and Paul McDonald play or played their club football with Arles–Killeen.

== Achievements ==
- Laois Senior Football Championships: (0)
  - Runners-Up 2006, 2013, 2014
- Laois Intermediate Football Championships (3)
  - 1997, 2001, 2003

== Notable players ==
- Donal Brennan
- Donal Kingston
- Brian McDonald
- Paul McDonald
- Billy O'Loughlin
