= Laois Senior Football Championship =

Gaelic football competition

- Irish: Craobh Peil Sinsir Laoise
- Founded: 1888
- Title holders: Portarlington (18th title)
- Most titles: Portlaoise (36 titles)
- Sponsors: Laois Shopping Centre

The Laois Senior Football Championship is an annual Gaelic football competition contested by top-tier Laois GAA clubs. The Laois County Board of the Gaelic Athletic Association has organised it since 1888.

Portarlington won the 2026 title, after defeating Courtwood in the final.

== Honours ==
The trophy presented to the winners is the Jack Delaney Cup.

The winners of the Laois Senior Championship qualify to represent their county in the Leinster Senior Club Football Championship. They often do well outside the county, with the likes of Portlaoise (1971, 1976, 1982, 1987, 2004, 2009) among the clubs from Laois to win at least one Leinster Championship after winning the Laois Senior Football Championship. The winners can, in turn, go on to play in the All-Ireland Senior Club Football Championship. In 1982–83, Portlaoise became the first club from Laois to win All-Ireland Senior Football Championship after winning the Leinster and Laois Senior Football Championships.

== List of finals ==
(r) = replay

Year	Winner	Score	Opponent	Score
1888	Ballinakill	0-07	Knock	0-00
1889†	Maryborough†	0-03	Wolfhill	0-02
1890	Ballyroan	0-03	The Heath	0-02
1891	Moyanna	0-04	Portarlington	0-02
1892	Maryborough/ The Heath	5-05	Ballyroan	0-01
1893	Portarlington	??	Maryborough	??
1894	No competition			
1895	No competition			
1896	Wolfhill	1-05	Portarlington	1-02
1897†	Maryborough†	w/o	Wolfhill	scr
1898	Abbeyleix	0-04*	Ballyroan	0-04
1899	Abbeyleix	0-04	Raheenabrogue	0-02
1900	No competition			
1901	Raheenabrogue	0-04	Abbeyleix	0-02
1902	Abbeyleix	1-03	Raheenabrogue	0-03
1903	Abbeyleix	??	Stradbally	??
1904	Abbeyleix	0-05	The Heath	0-04
1905	Stradbally	1-04	Raheenabrogue	0-03
1906†	Maryborough†	0-08, 0-04 (r) (obj)	Raheenabrogue	0-08, 1-03 (r)
1907†	Maryborough†	??	Rathdowney	??
1908	Stradbally	1-13	Portarlington	0-03
1909	Abbeyleix	1-10	Rathdowney	1-03
1910	Portarlington	1-13	O'Moore's Forest	0-04
1911	Stradbally	2-03	Maryborough	1-02
1912	Portarlington	0-02 (obj)	Stradbally	1-01
1913	The Heath	2-05	Rathdowney	1-00
1914	Ballyroan	1-06	The Heath	0-01
1915	Ballyroan	0-08	Portarlington	0-00
1916	Abbeyleix	2-00	Ballyroan	0-02
1917	Ballyroan	1-00	Abbeyleix	0-00
1918	The Heath	1-04, 1-01 (r)	Moyanna	2-01, 0-00 (r)
1919	Abbeyleix	2-02	The Heath	0-04
1920	The Heath	0-02. 5-04 (r)	Annanough	0-02, 0-01 (r)
1921	Portarlington	3-08	Abbeyleix	0-03
1922	Portarlington	3-02	Abbeyleix	1-02
1923	Portarlington	5-03	Annanough	2-00
1924	Annanough	1-02	Raheenabrogue	0-01
1925	Annanough	4-02	Ballyroan	0-05
1926	Annanough	1-02	Abbeyleix	0-00
1927	Graiguecullen	1-05	Stradbally	0-00
1928	Stradbally	1-03	Graiguecullen	1-01
1929	Stradbally	1-04	Graiguecullen	0-01
1930	Stradbally	2-05	Graiguecullen	2-03
1931	Graiguecullen	0-04, 3-07 (r)	The Heath	0-04, 0-00
1932	Stradbally	1-08	Portarlington	0-03
1933	Stradbally	3-02	Graiguecullen	1-06
1934	Stradbally	1-06	Graiguecullen	0-02
1935	Graiguecullen	4-01	Abbeyleix	1-05
1936	Stradbally	2-10	Graiguecullen	3-05
1937	Stradbally	3-03	Graiguecullen	1-02
1938	Graiguecullen	2-06	Abbeyleix	1-02
1939	Graiguecullen	0-07	Stradbally	0-05
1940	Stradbally	5-03	Graiguecullen	3-03
1941	Stradbally	2-07	Graiguecullen	3-03
1942	Graiguecullen	2-06	Ballyroan	0-02
1943	Ballyroan	0-09	Fleming's Fireclay	1-03
1944	Graiguecullen	3-07	Annanough	0-07
1945	Graiguecullen	3-07	Ballyroan	3-05
1946	Graiguecullen	4-06	Ballyroan	1-04
1947	Graiguecullen	1-09	Eoghan Ruadh	1-03
1948	Ballyroan	2-03, 1-08 (r)	Stradbally	1-06, 2-03 (r)
1949	Graiguecullen	3-07	Stradbally	0-03
1950	Ballyroan	1-09	Graiguecullen	2-04
1951	Annanough	3-04	Portarlington	1-03
1952	Park	0-05	Ballyroan	0-03
1953	Park	0-06	Portarlington	0-05
1954	Portarlington	3-06	Annanough	1-02
1955	Portarlington	1-08	Annanough	0-06
1956	Annanough	0-14	Park	0-05
1957	The Heath	1-08	Portarlington	0-05
1958	The Heath	1-08, 1-04 (r)	Portlaoise	2-05, 3-07 (r)
1959	Portarlington	2-02	Portlaoise	1-03
1960	The Heath	1-09	Annanough	0-00
1961	The Heath	3-06	O'Dempsey's	0-10
1962	The Heath	1-10	Portlaoise	0-03
1963	O'Dempsey's	2-05	Portarlington	2-03
1964	Portlaoise	1-05	Graiguecullen	0-07
1965	Graiguecullen	1-10	Timahoe	1-08
1966	Portlaoise	0-07, 2-08 (r)	O'Dempsey's	0-07, 1-04 (r)
1967	Portlaoise	4-09	Emo	1-07
1968	Portlaoise	1-10	Timahoe	1-05
1969	Timahoe	0-12	Portlaoise	0-09
1970	Portlaoise	1-07	St Joseph's	0-09
1971	Portlaoise	1-07	The Heath	0-07
1972	Emo	2-11	Graiguecullen	3-04
1973	St Joseph's	1-07	Timahoe	0-07
1974	The Heath	0-08, 0-09 (r)	Emo	0-08, 0-08 (r)
1975	St Joseph's	0-12	Graiguecullen	0-07
1976	Portlaoise	0-09, 2-10 (r)	Graiguecullen	1-06, 0-10 (r)
1977	St Joseph's	1-11	O'Dempsey's	1-09
1978	St Joseph's	3-09	Timahoe	1-05
1979	Portlaoise	1-10	St Joseph's	1-09
1980	O'Dempsey's	1-05	Graiguecullen	0-07
1981	Portlaoise	0-12	Graiguecullen	2-05
1982	Portlaoise	1-13	Annanough	0-04
1983	St Joseph's	1-09	O'Dempsey's	1-07
1984	Portlaoise	0-09, 2-08 (r)	Ballyroan	1-06, 1-05 (r)
1985	Portlaoise	1-06	Ballyroan	0-07
1986	Portlaoise	2-09	Emo	1-07
1987	Portlaoise	3-16	Ballylinan	0-05
1988	Portarlington	0-06	Timahoe	0-05
1989	St Joseph's	1-09, 1-08 (r)	Stradbally	1-09, 1-07 (r)
1990	Portlaoise	1-09	Ballyroan	0-08
1991	Portlaoise	0-07	Portarlington	0-05
1992	Ballyroan	0-08	St Joseph's	0-06
1993	The Heath	1-08, 2-17 (r)	Ballyroan	1-08, 2-15 (r)
1994	St Joseph's	1-16	Emo	2-07
1995	Portarlington	1-10	St Joseph's	0-07
1996	St Joseph's	0-10	Portarlington	1-06
1997	Stradbally	2-10	Portlaoise	0-10
1998	Stradbally	0-08	The Rock	0-05
1999	Portlaoise	1-13	St Joseph's	1-11
2000	St Joseph's	1-13	Portlaoise	1-08
2001	Portarlington	0-08, 2-13 (r)	Stradbally	0-08, 1-08 (r)
2002	Portlaoise	2-11	St Joseph's	1-06
2003	Arles–Kilcruise	0-08	Stradbally	0-07
2004	Portlaoise	0-15	Emo	0-06
2005	Stradbally	1-10	Portlaoise	1-09
2006	Ballyroan Gaels	0-10	Arles–Killeen	0-07
2007	Portlaoise	1-14	Stradbally	0-07
2008	Portlaoise	2-14	Timahoe	1-07
2009	Portlaoise	1-09	Arles–Kilcruise	0-07
2010	Portlaoise	1-08	Arles–Kilcruise	0-08
2011	Portlaoise	1-12	Graiguecullen	1-06
2012	Portlaoise	1-13	Arles–Kilcruise	0-09
2013	Portlaoise	2-08	Arles–Killeen	1-08
2014	Portlaoise	2-14	Arles–Killeen	0-09
2015	Portlaoise	0-15, 2-13 (r)	Emo	2-09, 0-07 (r)
2016	Stradbally	2-10	Portlaoise	1-12
2017	Portlaoise	3-13	Ballylinan	0-10
2018	Portlaoise	2-16	O'Dempsey's	1-13
2019	Portlaoise	0-14	Killeshin	2-07
2020	Portarlington	1-15	Graiguecullen	0-07
2021	Portarlington	4-09	Portlaoise	0-06
2022	Portarlington	2-13	O'Dempsey's	0-08
2023	St Joseph's	0-07	Portlaoise	0-06
2024	Portarlington	3-13	Portlaoise	0-13
2025	Portarlington	1-15, 1-07 (r)	Courtwood	2-12, 0-07 (r)
2026	Portarlington	1-19	Courtwood	0-08

Notes

† The 1889, 1897, 1906 and 1907 titles were won under the name Maryborough, now Portlaoise.

== Wins listed by club ==
#	Club	Wins	Years won
1	Portlaoise	35	1889, 1897, 1906, 1907, 1964, 1966, 1967, 1968, 1970, 1971, 1976, 1979, 1981, 1982, 1984, 1985, 1986, 1987, 1990, 1991, 1999, 2002, 2004, 2007, 2008, 2009, 2010, 2011, 2012, 2013, 2014, 2015, 2017, 2018, 2019
2	Portarlington	18	1893, 1910, 1912, 1921, 1922, 1923, 1954, 1955, 1959, 1988, 1995, 2001, 2020, 2021, 2022, 2024, 2025, 2026
3	Stradbally	17	1905, 1908, 1911, 1928, 1929, 1930, 1932, 1933, 1934, 1936, 1937, 1940, 1941, 1997, 1998, 2005, 2016
4	Graiguecullen	12	1927, 1931, 1935, 1938, 1939, 1942, 1944, 1945, 1946, 1947, 1949, 1965
5	The Heath	10	1913, 1918, 1920, 1957, 1958, 1960, 1961, 1962, 1974, 1993
5	St Joseph's	10	1973, 1975, 1977, 1978, 1983, 1989, 1994, 1996, 2000, 2023
6	Abbeyleix	8	1898, 1899, 1902, 1903, 1904, 1909, 1916, 1919
6	Ballyroan	8	1890, 1914, 1915, 1917, 1943, 1948, 1950, 1992
7	Annanough	5	1924, 1925, 1926, 1951, 1956
8	Park	2	1952, 1953
8	O'Dempsey's	2	1963, 1980
9	Ballinakill	1	1888
9	Moyanna	1	1891
9	Maryborough/ The Heath	1	1892
9	Wolfhill	1	1896
9	Raheenabrogue	1	1901
9	Timahoe	1	1969
9	Emo	1	1972
9	Arles–Kilcruise	1	2003
9	Ballyroan Gaels	1	2006
