= Slievemargy =

Barony in County Laois, Ireland

Slievemargy Sliabh Mairge (Irish)
- Barony
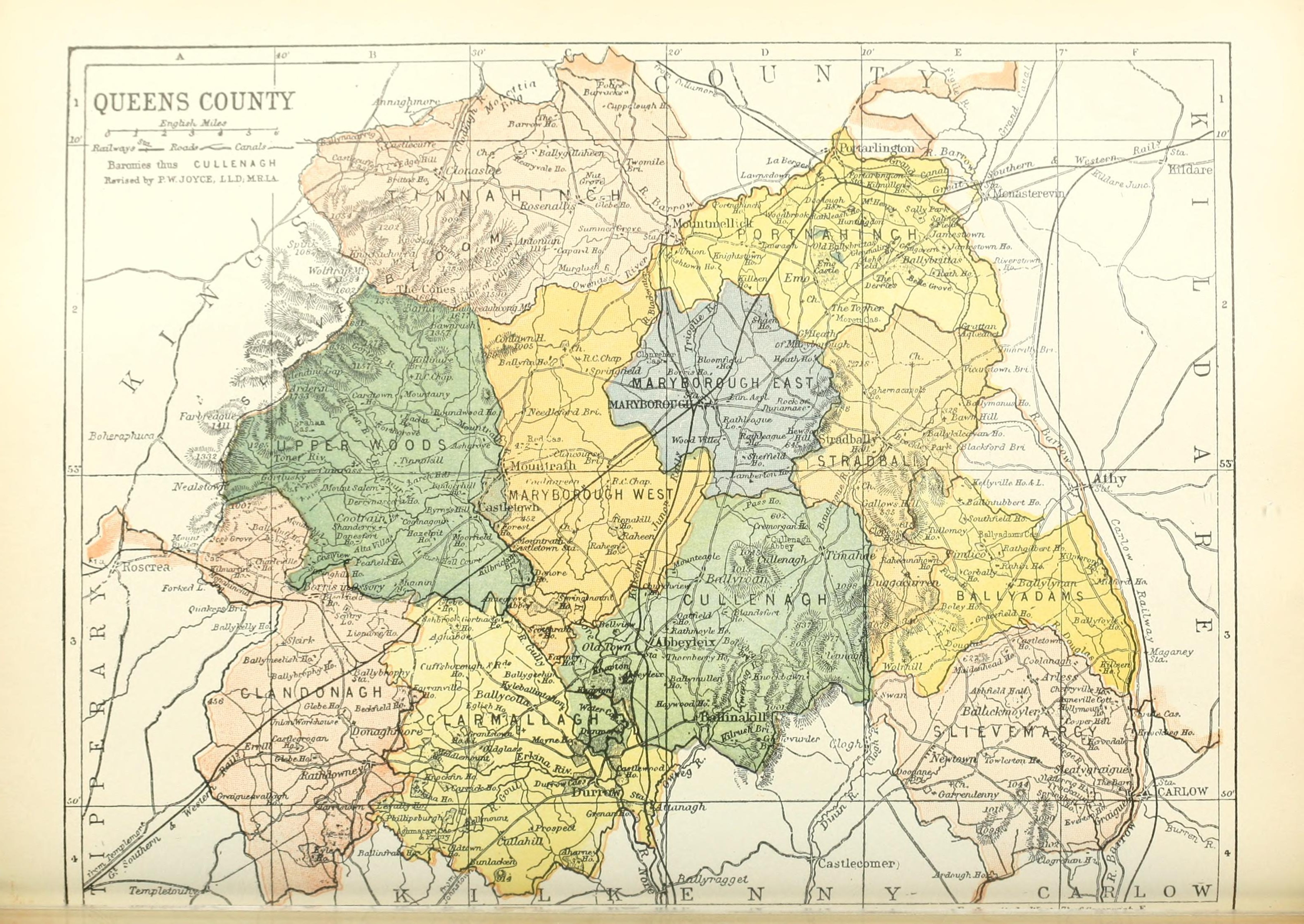
- Barony map of Laois, 1900; Slievemargy is pink, in the southeast.
- Sovereign state: Ireland
- Province: Leinster
- County: Laois

Area
  - Total: 143.62 km^{2} (55.45 sq mi)

Slievemargy (Irish: Sliabh Mairge, IPA: [ʃlʲiʊ̯(vˠ) mˠɑɾʲɟə]) is a barony in the south-eastern portion of County Laois, Ireland.

== Etymology ==
The barony is named after the large hill partially within its borders. The name Slievemargy is derived from the Irish name for the hill, Sliabh Mairge, with Sliabh meaning "mountain" and mairge being the genitive declension of mairg, meaning "gloom" or "woe". Thus, the hill's name could be translated as something akin to "mountain of gloom".

The barony's name has multiple spellings; it is also spelled Slieuemargue, Slewmergie, Slieuemargue and Slieuemargy, though these spellings are no longer used in modern times.

== Geography ==
Slievemargy is located to the west of the River Barrow. The barony is dominated by the hill (referred to as a mountain by locals) which exceeds 320m above sea level. The north-east region of the hill bares a vast view over much of Leinster, spying over much of Kildare and Carlow, with Carlow Town and the Wicklow Mountains being visible in their entirety from almost every point on the north-east edge. The Blackstairs are also visible from areas such as Rossmore. Much of the barony is covered in arable farmland and bogland, and gorse blossoms through virtually all of the upland area in the summer.

== History ==
Slievemargy corresponded roughly to the lordship of Ui Bairrche and was held by the septs Ó Tréasaigh (the Traceys) and MacGorman. The Uí Bhraonáin (the Brennans), too, have been a prominent family in the region for hundreds of years. Local legends claims the region to be the birthplace of the legendary Fionn mac Cumhaill, as well as his son, Oisín.

== List of settlements ==
Slievemargy is a rather barren region, with settlements being few and far between. Other major villages include:

- Arless
- Ballickmoyler
- Crettyard (spreads over into Kilkenny)
- Killeshin
- Newtown
- The Swan
- Bilboa (also spreads into Carlow and Kilkenny)
- Graiguecullen (across the river from Carlow Town)
