= Tinnahinch =

Tinnahinch may refer to several things in Ireland:

- Graiguenamanagh, a town on the Carlow-Kilkenny border, the Carlow side of which is referred to as Tinnahinch
  - Tinnahinch Castle, 17th-century tower in the Carlow Tinnahinch
- Tinnahinch (barony), a barony in County Laois
- Tinnahinch GAA, a defunct Gaelic Athletic Association (GAA) club based in Clonaslee, County Laois
