= R430 =

R430 may refer to:

- R430 road (Ireland)
- Radeon R430, a microchip used for graphics
