= Killeshin =

Village in County Laois, Ireland

Killeshin Cill Uisean
- Village
- Location in Ireland
- Coordinates: 52°50′58″N 6°59′42″W
- Country: Ireland
- Province: Leinster
- County: County Laois
- Time zone: UTC+0
  - Summer (DST): UTC-1

Killeshin (Irish: Cill Uisean, meaning 'church of [the glen of] Uise') is a village in County Laois, Ireland on the R430 regional road. Killeshin is a small rural community situated five kilometres west of Carlow town and overlooks the picturesque Barrow Valley. The church at the foot of Slievemargy, the hill above Killeshin, is the site of an early Christian monastery. The village is in a townland and civil parish of the same name.

== Name ==
Killeshin derives its English name from the Irish Cill Uisean. The place itself was named after one of the abbots of its famous monastery - Uisin or Uise. The place's name translates as "the Cell/church of Uise."

== History ==
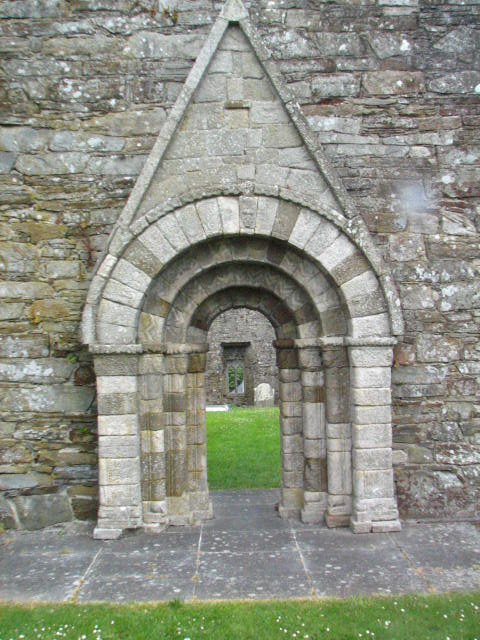
The Romanesque doorway of Killeshin church

Killeshin was an important centre for learning and culture as early as the 6th or 7th century when a monastery was founded there by either St. Comgan or St. Diarmait.

There are a number of references to Comgan and Diarmait in The Martyrology of Oengus the Culdee (1905) which state:

February 27 Feast of Comgan...Comgan son of Diarmait...

July 8 Feast of Diarmait...Modimoc...Glenn Uissen...

Index of persons - Comgan, son of Diarmait, feb 27, of Glenn Uissen...

Killeshin or Gleann Uissen, was early known as a great scriptorium. In the Annals of the Four Masters the stratum of Leinster material of the 9th–11th centuries may have been originated at Killeshin. While some four kilometres north west lie the ruins of Sleaty – Sleibthe, home to reputedly the first bishop of Leinster – St.Fiacc (c418-498)

== Hiberno-Romanesque architecture ==
Killeshin Church is located off the main Carlow-Castlecomer road, adjacent to Killeshin village itself. The church at Killeshin is largely from the 12th century, although some parts show evidence of later rebuilding, including a late Gothic east window The ancient monastery was destroyed in the 11th century and all that remains is a beautifully carved 12th-century doorway: one of the finest examples of hiberno-Romanesque architecture in Ireland.

No trace remains of the 105 ft round tower believed to have once been the tallest in Ireland which stood next to the monastery, it was demolished by an 18th-century landowner who was afraid that the tower could collapse and injure his cattle. It is said that ten counties can be seen from atop Slievemargy, the hill above Killeshin.

== Public transport ==
=== Bus ===
From January 1st, 2023 Local Link route 897 Kilkenny - Carlow - Athy serves the village several times daily. Until April 2019 the village was served by the Buggy Coaches Castlecomer-Crettyard-Carlow bus route with one journey into Carlow in the morning and one back in the afternoon. On Saturdays there were two journeys each way.

=== Rail ===
The nearest rail services may be accessed at Carlow railway station approximately 6 kilometres distant.

== Sport ==
Killeshin GAA is the local Gaelic Athletic Association club.

"Killeshin", a racehorse named after the village, competed in the Grand National steeplechase twice in the 1990s, finishing a remounted sixth in the 1998 Grand National.

There are a number of fishing spots in Ballyhide, and the River Barrow is nearby.

== See also ==
- List of towns and villages in Ireland
