= Mountmellick (parish) =

Catholic parish in County Laois, Ireland

- Roman Catholic parish
- Location in Ireland
- Coordinates: 53°06′59″N 7°19′27″W
- Country: Ireland
- Province: Leinster
- County: County Laois
- Time zone: UTC+0 (WET)
  - Summer (DST): UTC-1 (IST (WEST))

Mountmellick, is a Catholic parish in Tinnahinch, County Laois within the Diocese of Kildare and Leighlin in Ireland.

As of 2023, the parish priest was Mícheál Murphy.

== Churches ==
The parish is served by two churches: St. Joseph's Church in Mountmellick and St. Mary's Church in Clonaghadoo.

The main church is St. Joseph's Church in Mountmellick. Building of this church started in 1864, to be completed in 1878. In 1912, a bell-tower was added. The church was originally a rectangle until an extension in 1965 changed it in a cruciform shape.

The second church in the parish is the St. Mary's Church in Clonaghadoo. This church was built in 1970 and replaced an older chapel a short distance away.

== Notable people ==
- Patrick Lennon, parish priest and later bishop of Kildare and Leighlin
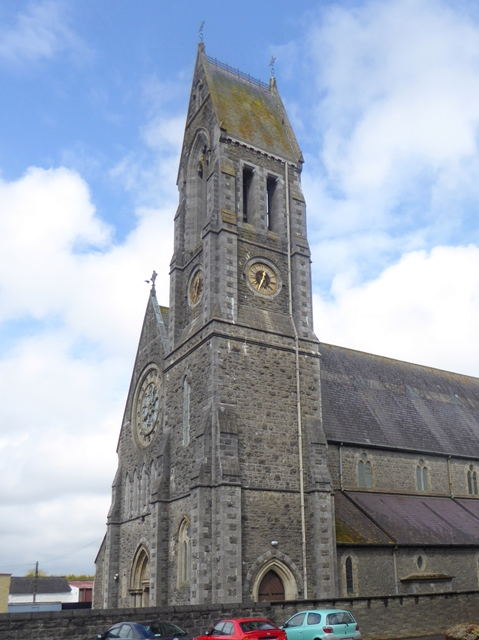
St. Joseph's Church, Mountmellick

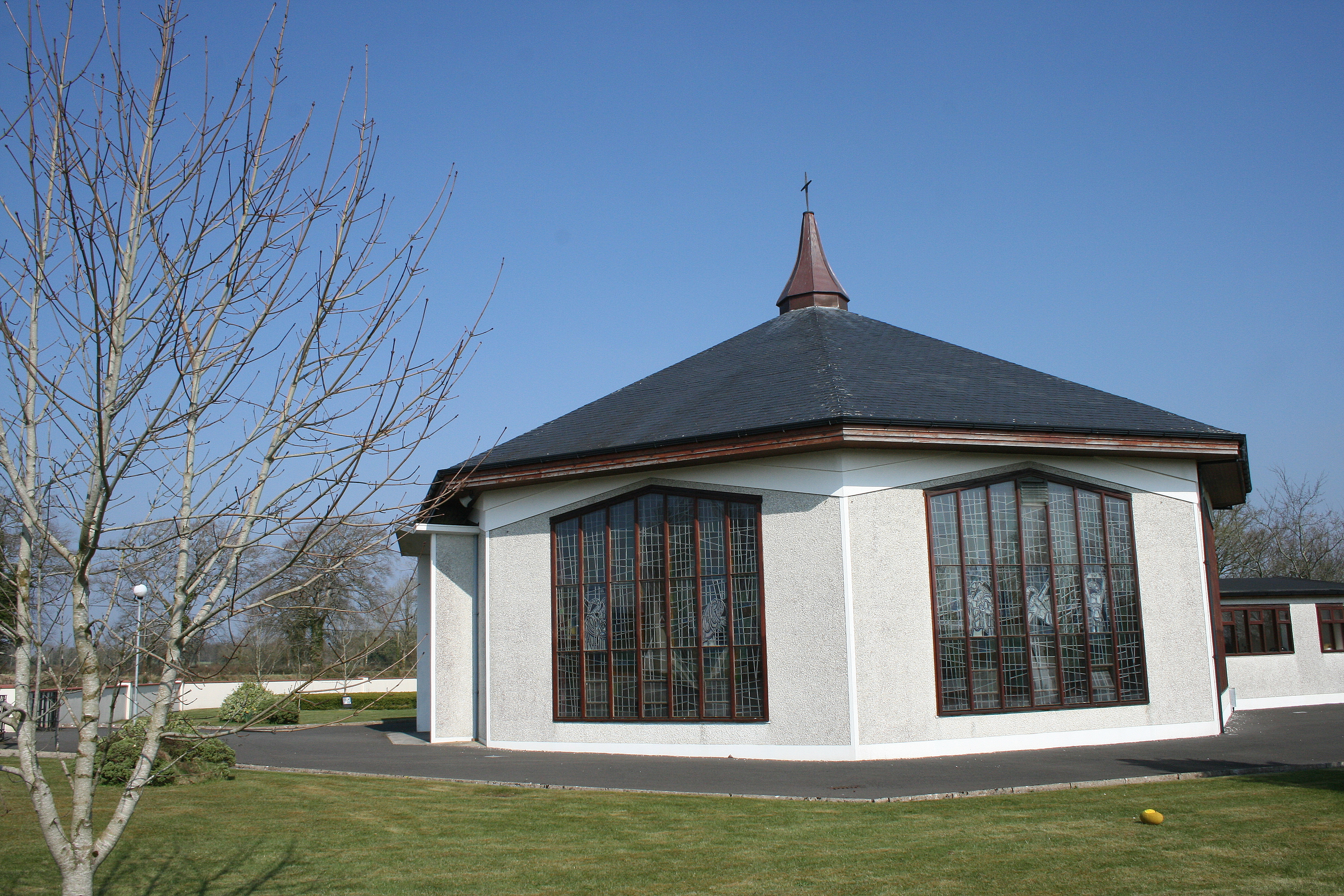
St. Mary's Church, Clonaghadoo
