= David Murphy =

David or Dave Murphy may refer to:

== Sports ==
- David Murphy (Australian rules footballer) (born 1962), Australian rules footballer
- Dave Murphy (baseball) (David Francis Murphy, 1876–1940), American shortstop for the Boston Beaneaters
- David Murphy (baseball) (David Matthew Murphy, born 1981), American outfielder for the Red Sox, Rangers, Indians, and Angels
- David Murphy (cricketer) (born 1989), Scottish cricketer
- David Murphy (footballer, born 1917) (David Anthony Murphy, 1917–1944), English footballer
- David Murphy (footballer, born 1984) (David Paul Murphy), English footballer
- David Murphy (Laois Gaelic footballer) (born 1985), Gaelic footballer
- David Murphy (Wexford Gaelic footballer), Gaelic footballer
- Dave Murphy (shot putter) (born 1948), American shot putter and discus thrower, 1970 NCAA runner-up for the USC Trojans track and field team

== Others ==
- David Murphy (CIA) (1921–2014), CIA station chief in Berlin, 1959–1961
- David Murphy (composer), Irish composer and harper
- David Lee Murphy (born 1959), American country music singer-songwriter
- Dave Murphy (politician) (David J. Murphy, born 1954), American businessman and politician in Wisconsin
- David Murphy, contestant on Survivor: Redemption Island (2011)
