= R432 road (Ireland) =

Road in Ireland

R432 road
- Bóthar R432

Route information
- Length: 17 km (11 mi)

Location
- Country: Ireland
- Primary destinations: County Laois; Abbeyleix leave R430 in Town Centre; Ballinakill; County Kilkenny; Longhill; Ballyragget, terminates at the N77

Highway system
- Roads in Ireland; Motorways; Primary; Secondary; Regional

The R432 road is a regional road in Ireland, which runs north–south from the R430 in Abbeyleix, County Laois to the N77 in Ballyragget, County Kilkenny.

The route is 17 km (11 mi) long.

== See also ==
- Roads in Ireland
- National primary road
- National secondary road
