= R429 road (Ireland) =

Road in Ireland

Coordinates: 52.908836°N 6.954087°W

R429 road
- Bóthar R429
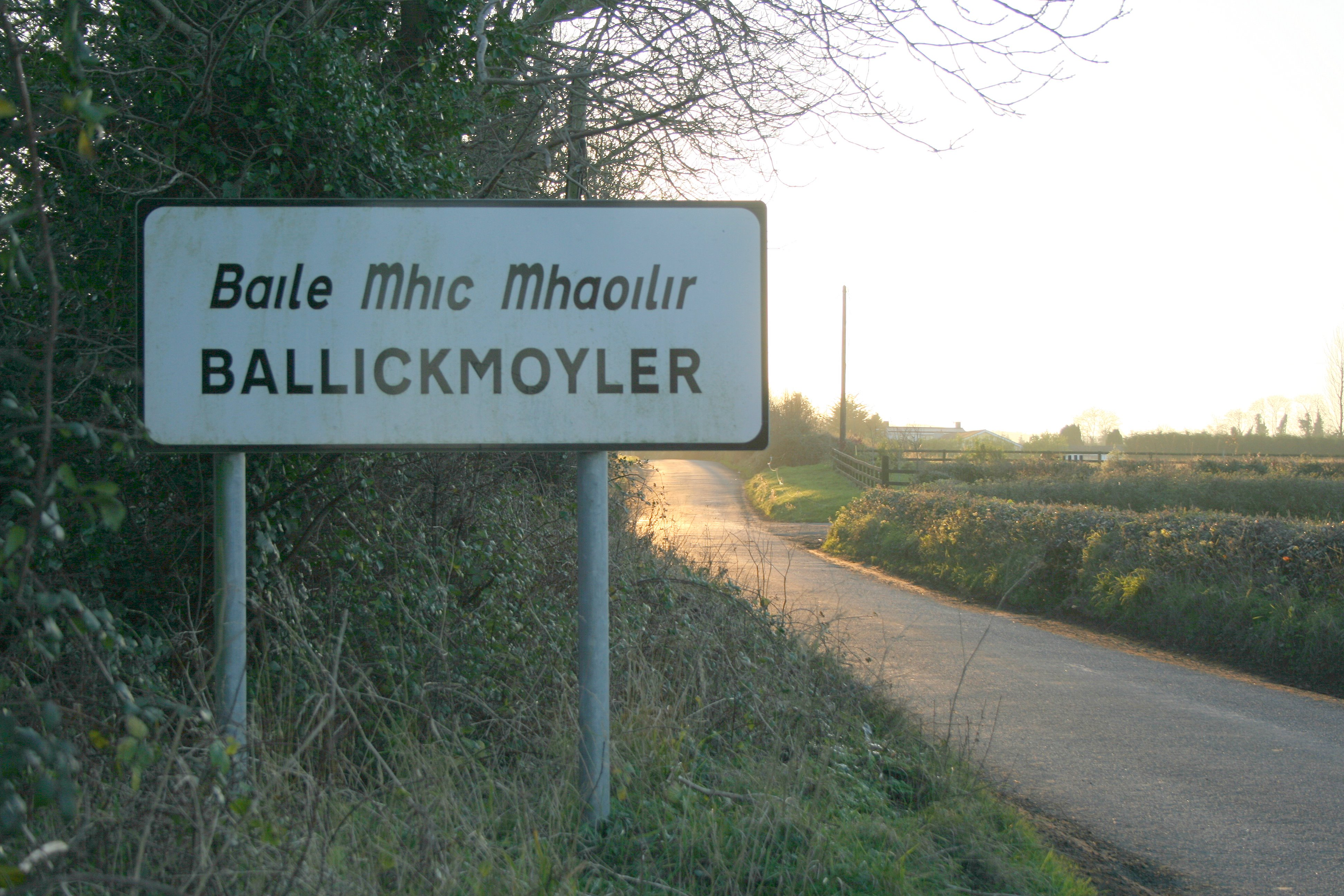
- Entrance to Ballickmoyler on the R429

Route information
- Length: 6.8 km (4.2 mi)

Major junctions
- From: N80 Ballickmoyler
- Passes through Killeen; Crosses River Barrow and enters County Kildare
- To: R417 Maganey

Location
- Country: Ireland

Highway system
- Roads in Ireland; Motorways; Primary; Secondary; Regional

The R429 road is a regional road in Ireland, located in County Laois and County Kildare.
