= R431 road (Ireland) =

Road in Ireland

Coordinates: 52.846036°N 7.088740°W

R431 road
- Bóthar R431
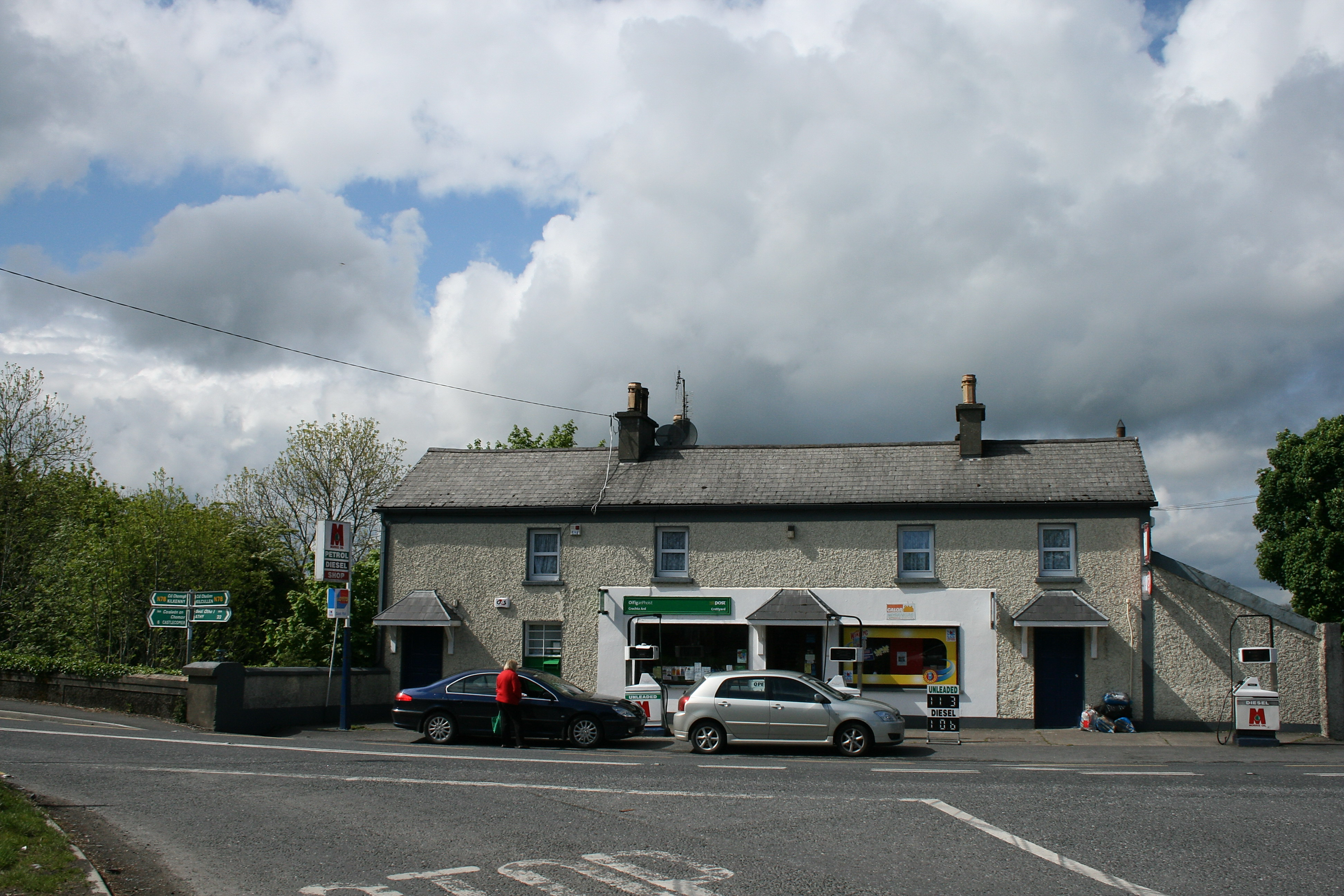
- R431 at its junction with the N78 in Crettyard

Route information
- Length: 4.7 km (2.9 mi)

Major junctions
- From: N78 Crettyard
- Crosses River Dinan
- To: R430 Molloys Cross

Location
- Country: Ireland

Highway system
- Roads in Ireland; Motorways; Primary; Secondary; Regional

The R431 road is a regional road in Ireland, located in County Laois.
