= Stradbally (disambiguation) =

Stradbally is a town in County Laois, Ireland.

Stradbally may also refer to other things in Ireland:

- Stradbally (barony), County Laois
- Stradbally, County Kerry, a small village
- Stradbally, County Waterford, a village
  - Stradbally GAA (Waterford), Gaelic sports club in the Waterford village

== See also ==
- Stradbally Hall, large house in the County Laois town
  - Stradbally Woodland Railway, short heritage railway at Stradbally Hall
