= Tinnakill Castle =

Ruined tower house in County Laois, Ireland

Coordinates: 53.128°N 7.251°W

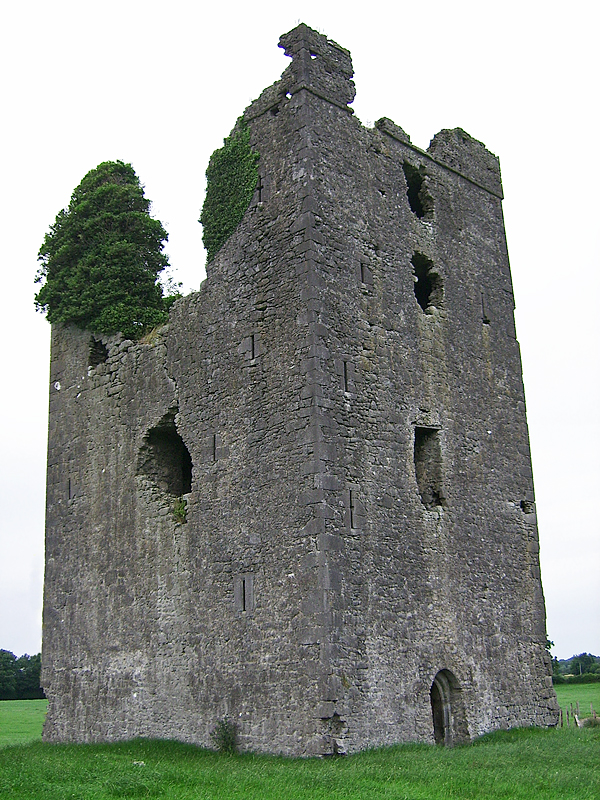
Tinnakill Castle

Tinnakill Castle (Irish: Tigh na Coille, lit. 'house of the wood'), also known as Tynekill, is a ruined medieval tower house in the parish of Coolbanagher, in the Barony of Portnahinch, County Laois in Ireland.

== History ==
Some sources suggest that the four-storey tower house dates from the mid-15th century and was built by Eoin Carragh MacDonnell (known as "John the Scabbed"), on the site of an earlier castle. Other sources date the structure to the 16th century, noting that it may have been owned by the O'Connor family before becoming a seat of the MacDonnells. Associated with the McDonnell family for some time, the last McDonnell to hold Tinnakill was James McDonnell, from whom the site was seized following his role in the Irish Rebellion of 1641. The tower house subsequently fell into disrepair, with some structural works undertaken to protect the ruin in the 19th century.

== Form ==
The tower house was built of limestone over four storeys, with dimensions of up to 10 metres by 11.8 metres.

A sheela na gig figure was originally carved on a limestone window jamb on the building's second floor; it was removed in later centuries.
