= R426 road (Ireland) =

Road in Ireland

R426 road
- Bóthar R426
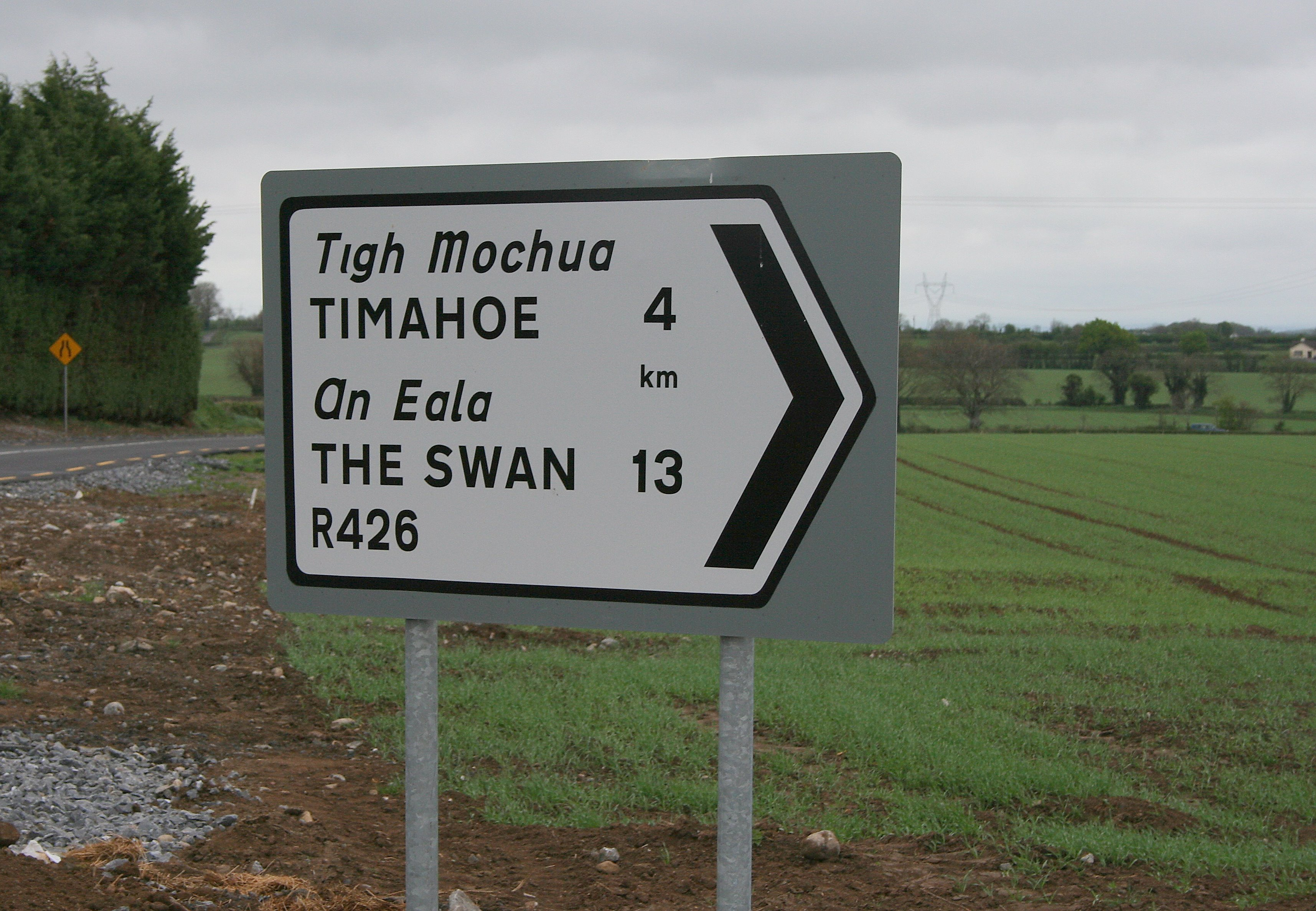
- At junction with R427

Route information
- Length: 32 km (20 mi)

Location
- Country: Ireland
- Primary destinations: County Laois; Portlaoise leave the N80 in Town Centre; Joins the R425, crosses the M7, then leaves the R425; R427; Timahoe; The Swan – R430; County Kilkenny; Clogh; Castlecomer, terminates at the N78

Highway system
- Roads in Ireland; Motorways; Primary; Secondary; Regional

The R426 road is a regional road in Ireland, which runs north–south from the N80 in Portlaoise, County Laois to the N78 in Castlecomer, County Kilkenny. The route is 32 km (20 mi) long.

== See also ==
- Roads in Ireland
- National primary road
- National secondary road
