= Des Connolly =

Irish Gaelic footballer

Des Connolly was a footballer from County Laois.

Connolly was a native of Ballyfoyle in the Ballylinan parish but played all his club football with the Carlow border club, Graiguecullen.

Considered to be one of Laois's greatest ever players, he was however only a substitute when the county won the Leinster Senior Football Championship final against Kildare in 1946.

Laois didn't win the Leinster Senior Football Championship again until 2003 when Mick O'Dwyer led them to victory.
