= R430 road (Ireland) =

Road in Ireland

R430 road
- Bóthar R430
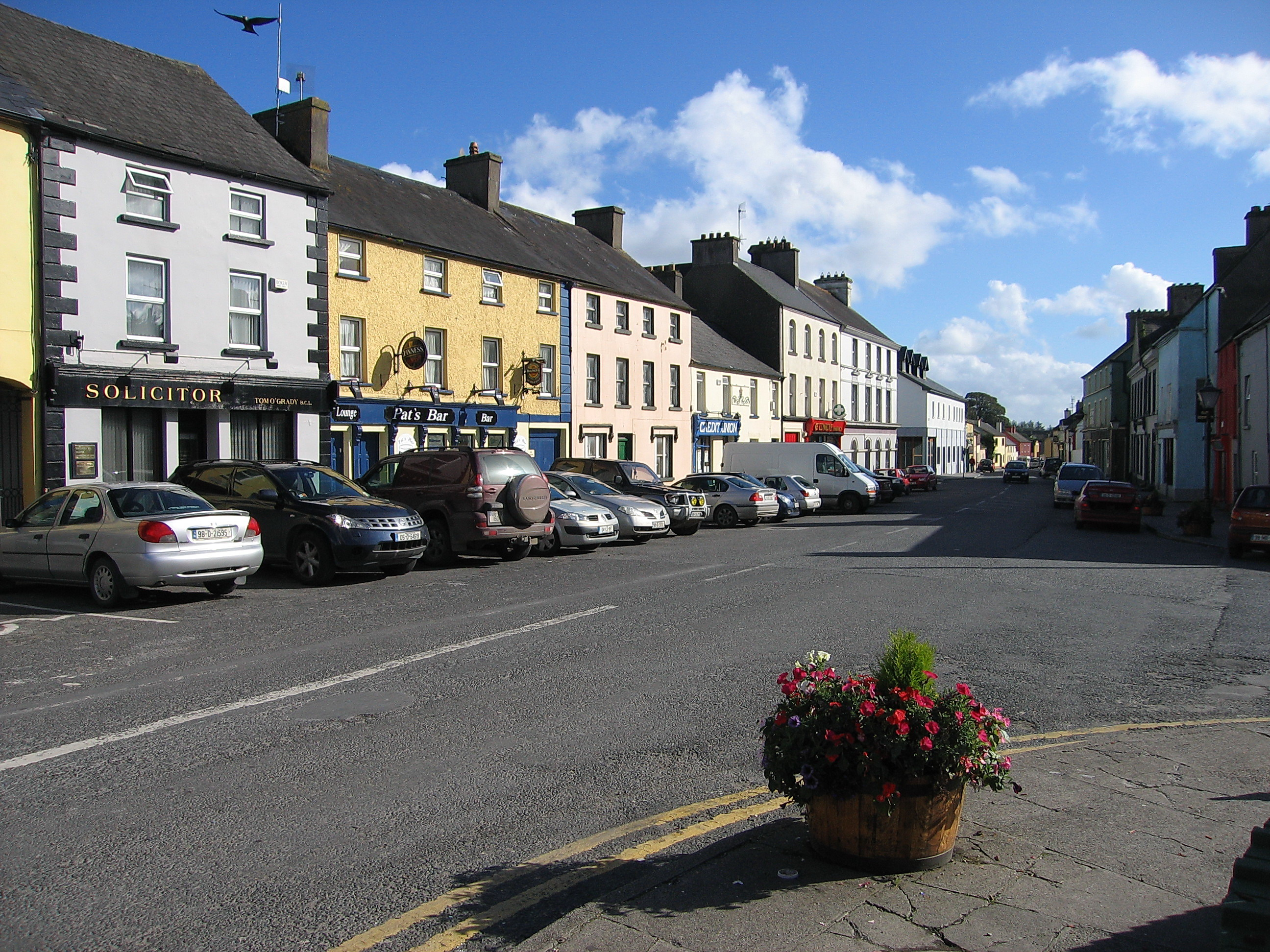
- Mountrath town centre, on the R430

Route information
- Length: 47 km (29 mi)

Location
- Country: Ireland
- Primary destinations: County Laois; Mountrath leave the R445 in the Town Centre; Crosses under the Dublin-Cork railway line.; Crosses under the M7.; Abbeyleix – (R432); Spink; The Swan – (R426); Newtown – (N78); (R431); Killeshin; County Carlow; Carlow, terminates at the R448

Highway system
- Roads in Ireland; Motorways; Primary; Secondary; Regional

The R430 road is a regional road in Ireland, which runs west-east from the R445 in Mountrath, County Laois to the R448 in Carlow, County Carlow. The route is 47 km (29 mi) long.

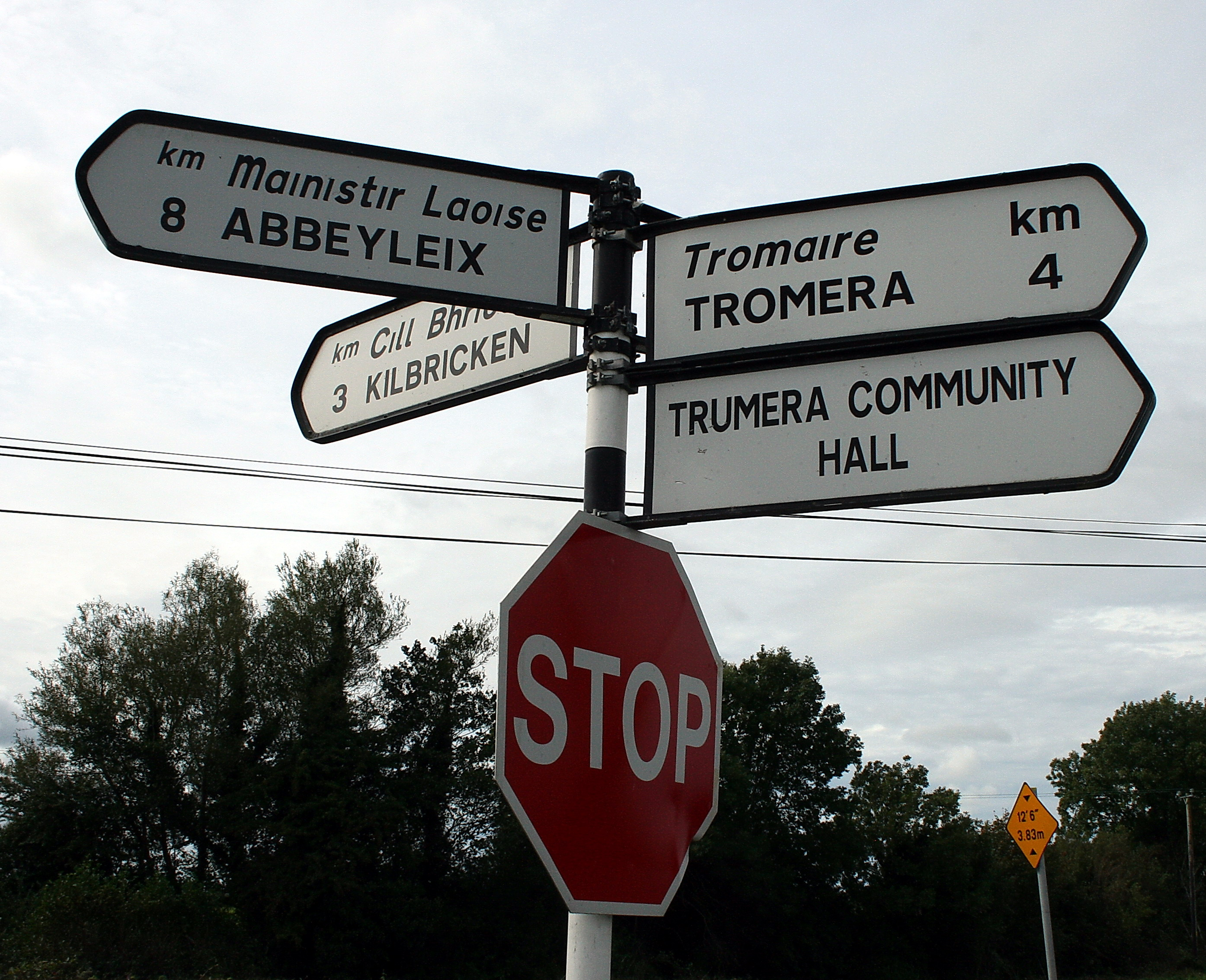
Signs on the R430

== See also ==
- Roads in Ireland
- National primary road
- National secondary road
