= Ballyhide =

Village in County Carlow, Ireland

Ballyhide Baile an Hídigh
- Townland
- Location in Ireland
- Coordinates: 52°49′17″N 6°58′07″W
- Country: Ireland
- Province: Leinster
- County: County Laois
- Time zone: UTC+0 (WET)
  - Summer (DST): UTC-1 (IST (WEST))
- Irish Grid Reference: S702742

Ballyhide (Irish: Baile an Hídigh, meaning 'town of An tÍdeach (de la Hyde)') is a rural townland and village in the extreme south eastern corner of County Laois, Ireland at the border with County Carlow. The nearest urban centre is Carlow town which is 3 kilometres to the north east. It is located in the Luggacurren Local Electoral District.

== Demographics ==
As of the 2011 census, the townland of Ballyhide had a population of 163 people. The most densely populated area of Ballyhide is a small village situated beside the River Barrow at the border with Crossneen, another local townland. Some of the population are employed in Carlow town, while others work in the Clogrennane Lime plant which is situated 2.5 kilometres to the south west. The area is agricultural, and dairying is the main farming enterprise.

== Geography ==
Ballyhide townland is in the historic barony of Slievemargy. It is bordered to the south by the River Barrow and the county boundary between County Laois and County Carlow, to the east by Crossneen and to the north by Springhill which are other townlands within the same parish. The River Fuishoge also runs through the area and is a tributary of the Barrow. The area lies at the foot of a 336m high hill referred to as Rossmore, Killeshin hill and often on maps as Slieve Margy.

== Landmarks ==
The ruin of a mansion, sometimes referred to locally as Rochfort's Castle, sits at the foot of the hill overlooking Ballyhide. It was once owned by the Rochfort family, an Anglo-Irish landlord family, who were landlords for much of the area prior to the Irish War of Independence. The Primary Valuation of Ireland, or 'Griffiths Valuation', carried out in Laois in 1851/52 refers to the local landlord as Horace Rochfort Esq. The mansion was sold by Rochfords to a local businessman when the family emigrated to England at the time of the Irish civil war. Many attempts to sell the building on for use such as college accommodation failed. A small fire was started by a couple of adventurous youths but little damage was done and the owner was compensated by the county council. During World War II the building was dismantled and the timber, slates, lead etc. were sold as salvage, leaving only the stone shell as it exists today. Up 1955, access to the top of the ruin was possible by way of the stone service stairs. As children we walked around the top of the walls which from memory must have been a meter wide. Ballyhide is located on the banks of the River Barrow, and a stretch of river where the small canal rejoins the Barrow, locally known as Lanigans Lock, is used for trout fishing. While also previously used as a swimming spot, Laois County Council have posted signs warning of the dangers of swimming in the water at this point. A walkway known as the Barrow track runs from Milford, downriver of Ballyhide through this area and into Carlow town.

== Sport ==
There are two Gaelic football clubs in the area, Graiguecullen GAA and Killeshin GAA. Some Ballyhide residents play soccer (association football) with Killeshin or with Graiguecullen-based clubs like St Patricks Boys FC or St Fiaccs FC.

== Education ==
The local primary schools include Scoil Chomhgáin Naofa, Killeshin and St Fiaccs National School, Graiguecullen. Secondary schools in the area include St Leo's College, Carlow for girls, the Christian Brothers Academy for boys or mixed schools such as Carlow Vocational School, Gaelcholáiste Ceatharlach or Presentation College.

== See also ==
- List of towns and villages in Ireland
