= The Laois Voice =

The Laois Voice was a local newspaper in County Laois, Ireland. It was published by the now defunct Voice Newspaper group.

Following closure of several of the group's other publications, the Laois Voice shut down in 2008.
