= Tinnahinch Castle =

Ruined tower house in County Carlow, Ireland

- Caislean Tigh na hInse (Irish)
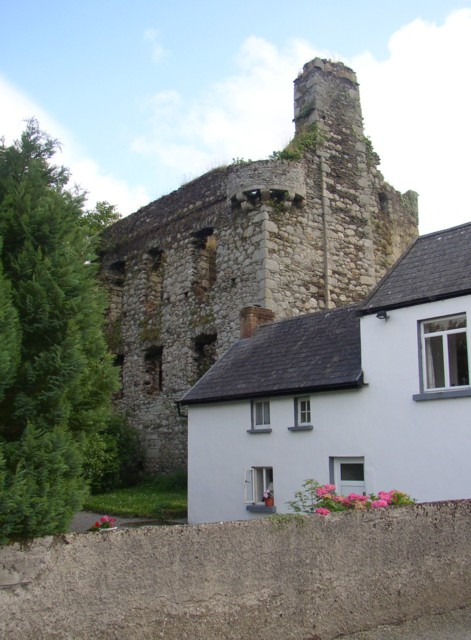
- Tinnahinch Castle

- Location within Ireland
- 52°32′14.98″N 6°57′26.12″W
- Location: Tinnahinch, County Carlow, Ireland

History
- Built: 1615

Tinnahinch Castle (Irish: Caislean Tigh na hInse) is a ruined tower house located near River Barrow in Tinnahinch, County Carlow, Ireland. It has a rectangular structure with a stair tower at the southwest angle, a machicolation between the angles of the two towers protecting the doorway, and a bartizan on the north east angle. All of the windows in the north wall have been stolen.

At the eastern corner nearest to the river was a barbican which was constructed on corbels projecting from the walls which defended the northern and eastern sides.

The tower is planned to be destroyed due to safety concerns.

== History ==
The tower was built by James Butler during 1615 as a means of controlling the passage over the river, however, he lost control over the tower after being involved in the Irish Confederate Wars in 1641, with the tower being further strengthened by the Confederates.

The last occupant, locally known as the Mad Butler, was burned outside the tower due to scandals that involved his family. The tower was also burned down in 1700 and has since been standing in ruins.
