= David Murphy (footballer, born 1917) =

English footballer

Personal information
- Full name: David Anthony Murphy
- Date of birth: 19 July 1917
- Place of birth: South Bank, England
- Date of death: 19 September 1944 (aged 27)
- Place of death: Fascist Italy
- Position: Left-half

Senior career*
Years	Team	Apps	(Gls)
- South Bank St. Peters
1937–1939	Middlesbrough	15	(0)
1939–1940	Blackburn Rovers		
- * Club domestic league appearances and goals

David Anthony Murphy (19 July 1917 – 19 September 1944) was an English professional footballer who played as a left-half in the Football League for Middlesbrough.

== Personal life ==
Murphy served as a gunner in the Royal Artillery during the Second World War and was killed on 19 September 1944 during the advance from Ancona to Rimini in the Italian campaign. He is buried at the Gradara War Cemetery.

== Career statistics ==
Appearances and goals by club, season and competition
Club	Season	League			FA Cup		Total	
Club	Season	Division	Apps	Goals	Apps	Goals	Apps	Goals
Middlesbrough	1937–38	First Division	2	0	0	0	2	0
Middlesbrough	1938–39	First Division	10	0	3	0	13	0
Career total			12	0	3	0	15	0
