= David Murphy (Laois Gaelic footballer) =

Irish Gaelic footballer

Personal information
- Native name: Daibhéid Ó Murchú (Irish)
- Nickname: Squirty
- Born: Portlaoise, Republic of Ireland

Sport
- Sport: Gaelic football
- Position: Midfield/Half Forward
Club
- Years: Club
- ? -?: Portarlington
Inter-county
- Years: County
- ?- ?: Laois

David Murphy (born 1985) is a Gaelic footballer from County Laois.

He plays at wing forward for Laois and in 2003 was part of the Laois team that won the All-Ireland Minor Football Championship title for the first time since 1997. He scored a late equaliser in the drawn final against Dublin to secure a replay.

In 2006, Murphy was part of the Laois team that won the Leinster U21 Football Championship.
