= Clonaghadoo =

Village on Laois/Offaly border within Mountmellick Parish

Coordinates: 53.1711°N 7.3719°W

- Village
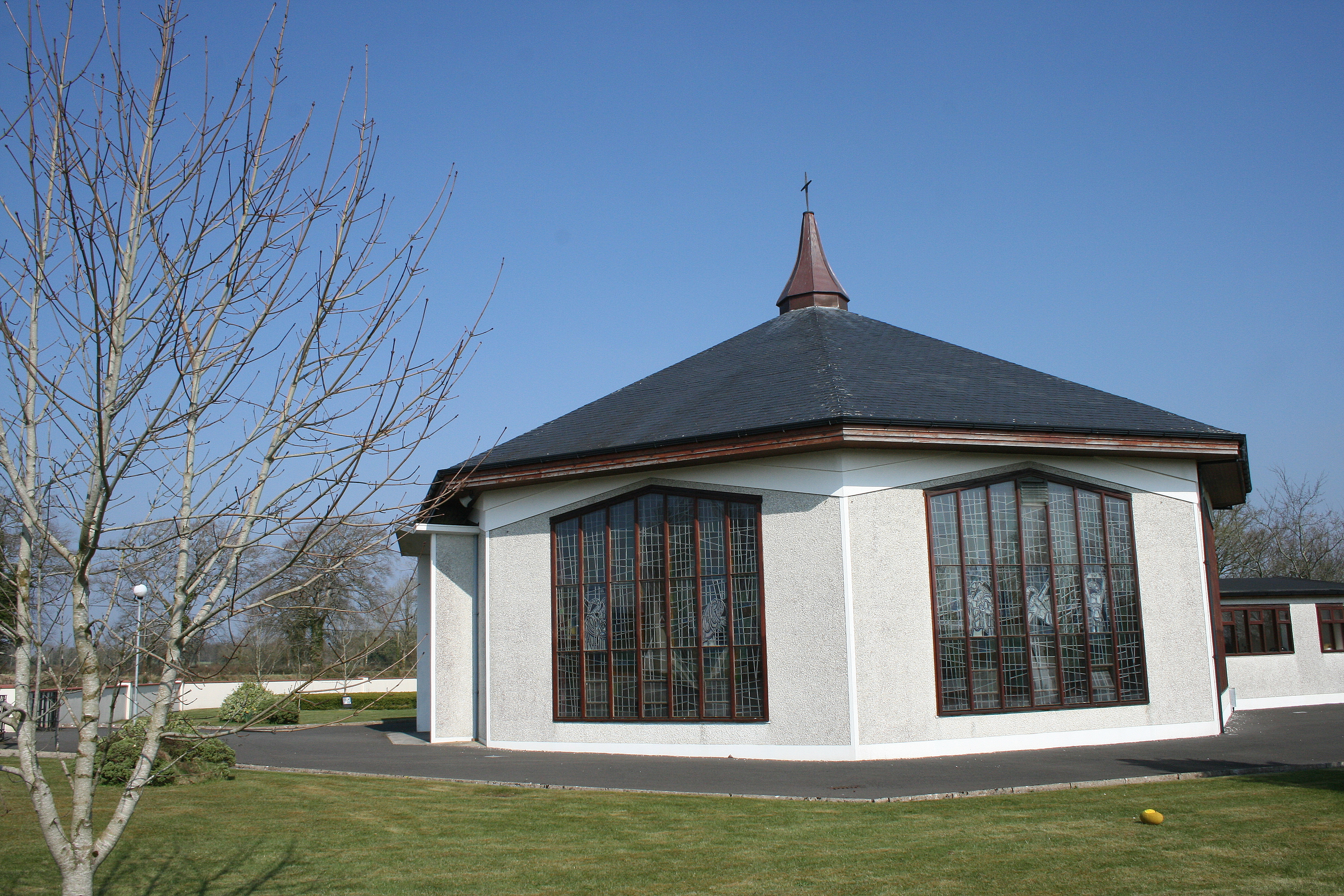
- Clonaghadoo Church

- Location in Ireland
- Country: Ireland
- Province: Leinster
- County: County Laois
- Time zone: UTC+0 (WET)
  - Summer (DST): IST (WEST)

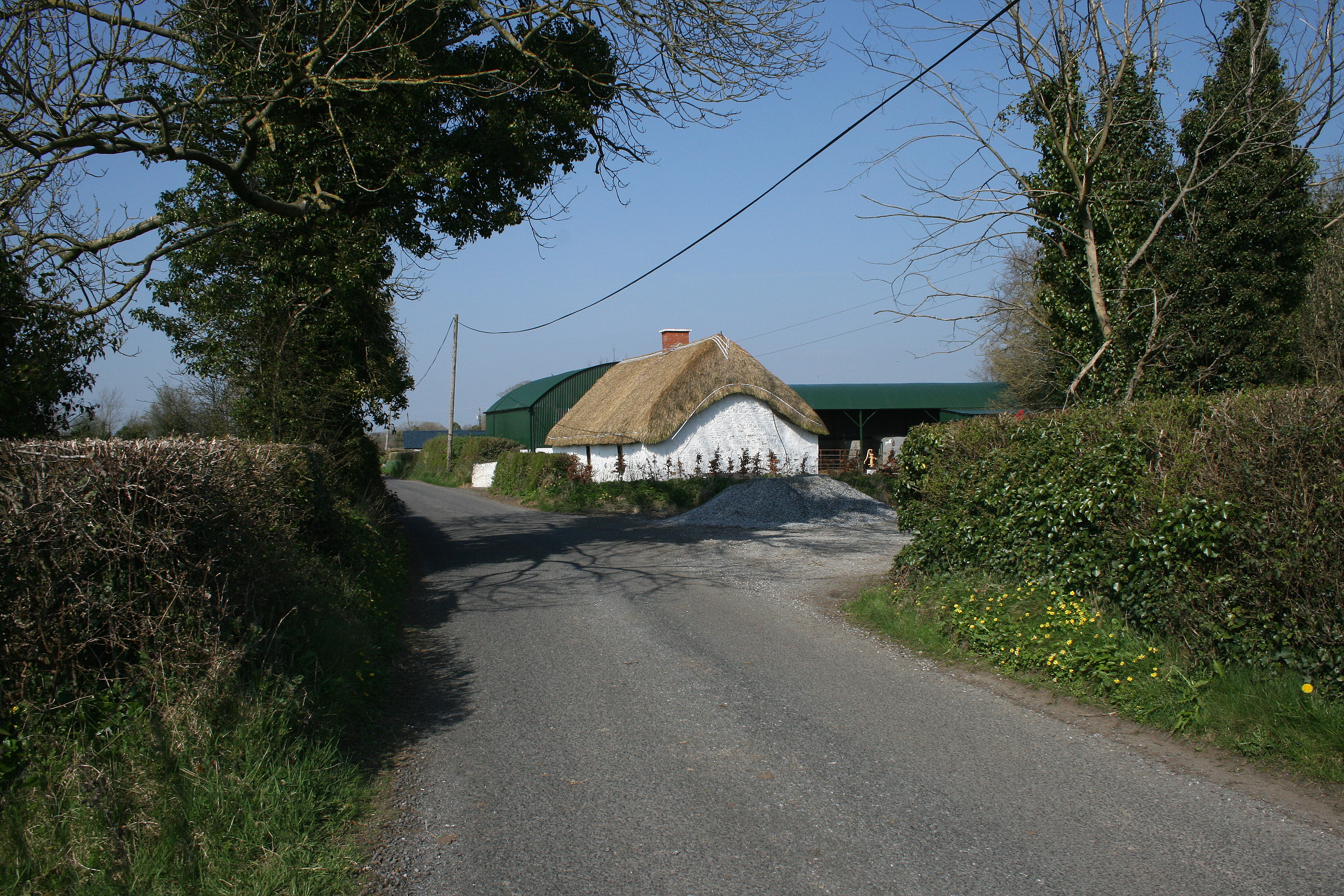
The road to Clonaghadoo

Clonaghadoo is a village in County Laois, Ireland, located 6 km (3.7 mi) north of Mountmellick just off the N80 national secondary road. The Slieve Bloom Mountains lie southwest of the village. The village is part of the Roman Catholic parish Mountmellick.

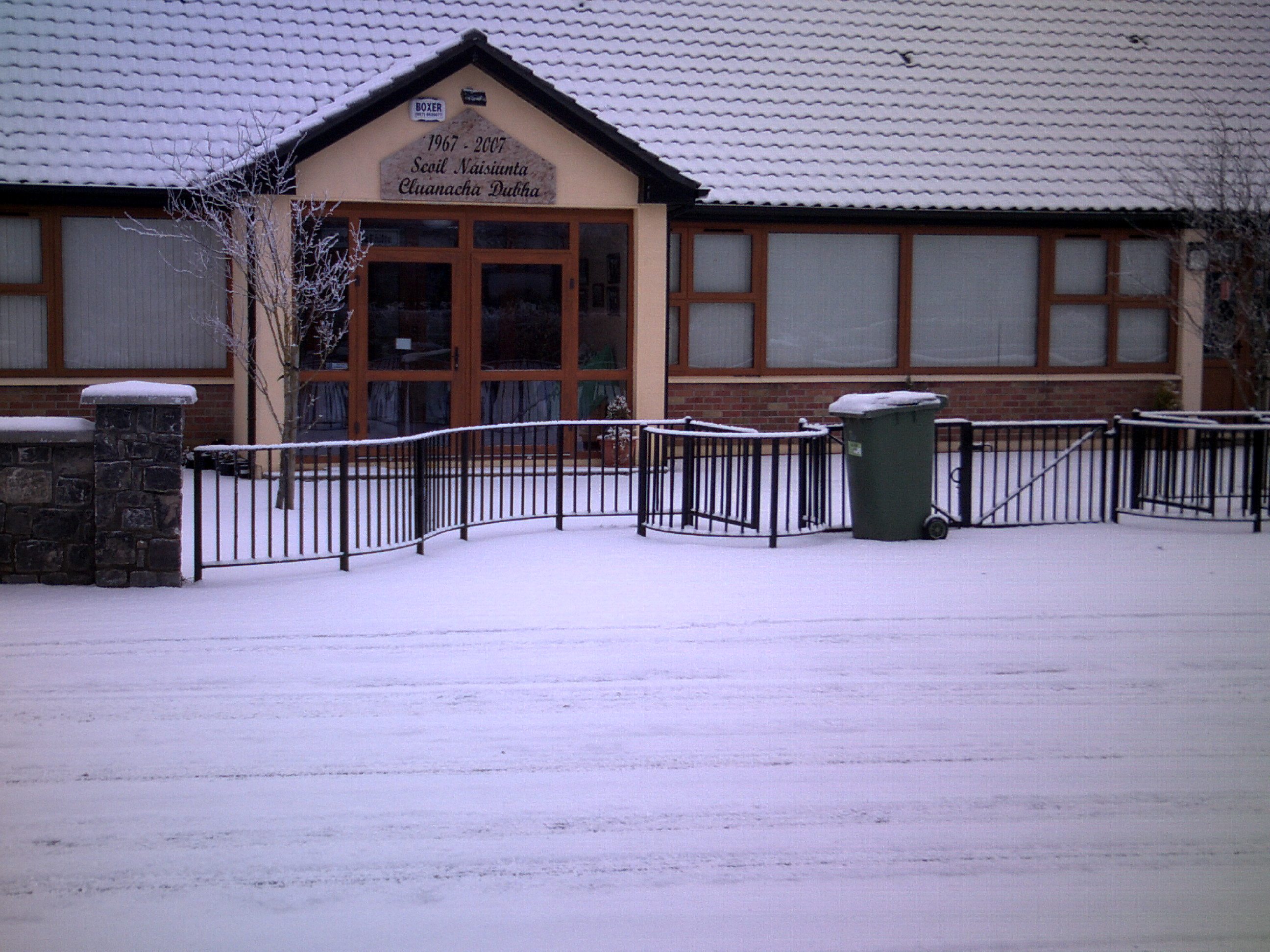
St Marys National School Clonaghadoo

== Amenities ==
There is a Catholic church, school and a community hall. The hall was originally a Clonaghadoo National School, opened in 1912. The name Clonaghadoo comes from Cluanacha Dubha, or the Black Meadows.

In the grounds of the church, there is a labyrinth of low hedges and gravel paths.

== Sport ==
Kilcavan GAA is the village's club for Gaelic football, while other nearby Gaelic games clubs are The Rock GAA and Mountmellick GAA.

== See also ==
- List of towns and villages in Ireland
