= Ballickmoyler =

Village in County Laois, Ireland

Ballickmoyler Baile Mhic Mhaoilir
- Village
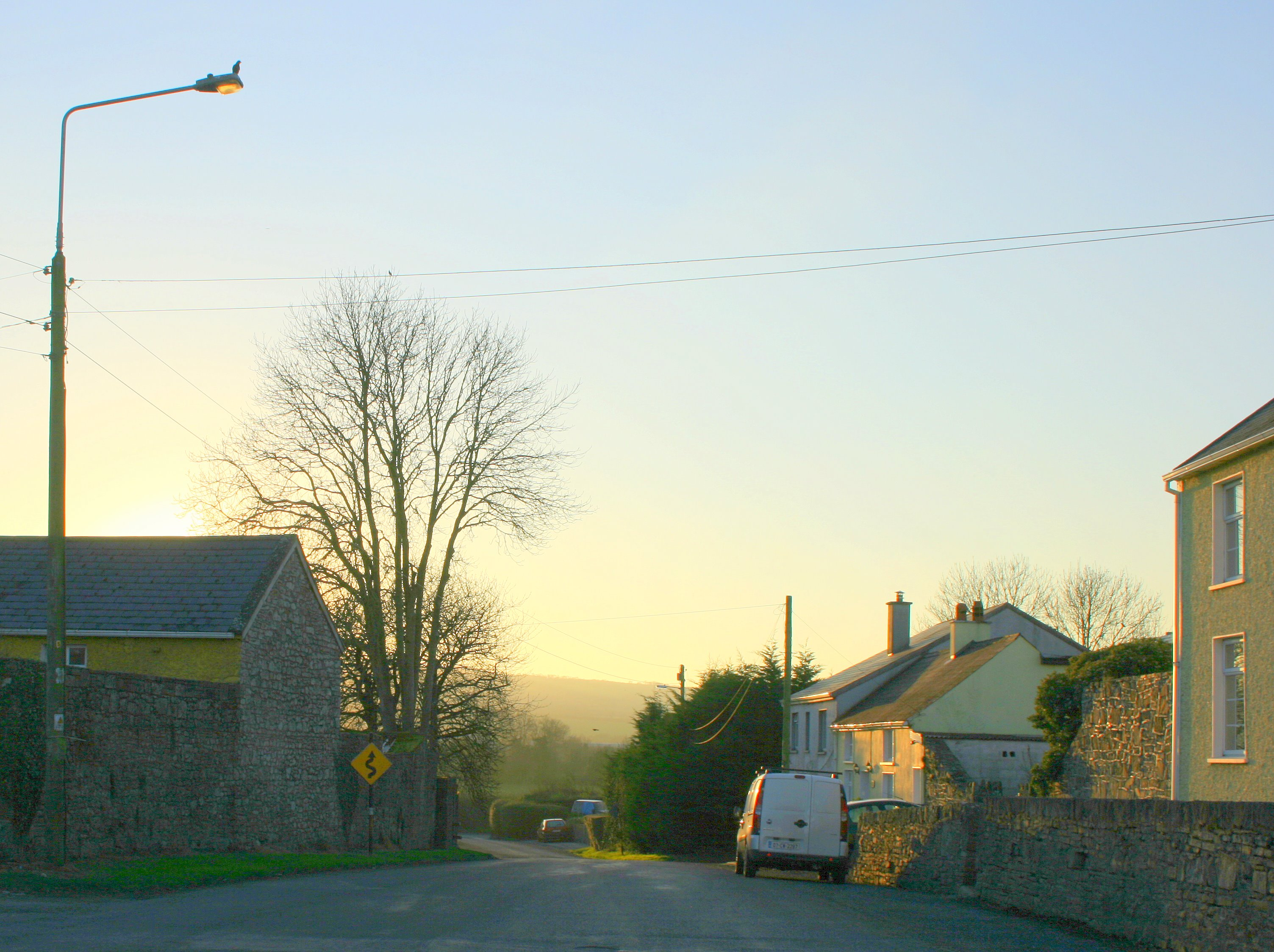
- Ballickmoyler on the N80

- Location in Ireland
- Coordinates: 52°52′40″N 7°00′40″W
- Country: Ireland
- Province: Leinster
- County: County Laois

Ballickmoyler or Ballicmoyler (Irish: Baile Mhic Mhaoilir, meaning 'the town of the son of Maoilir') is a village and townland in County Laois, Ireland. It lies 30 km (19 mi) southeast of Portlaoise, at the junction of the N80 national secondary road and the R429 regional road.

== Public transport ==
During the week Ballickmoyler is served by JJ Kavanagh and Sons Abbeyleix/Portlaoise-Athy-Carlow bus route with two daily journeys each way. Bus Éireann route number 73, from Waterford to Athlone, passes through but does not stop. Rail services may be accessed at Carlow railway station.

== See also ==
- List of towns and villages in Ireland
