= Stradbally (barony) =

Barony in County Laois, Ireland

Stradbally An Sráidbhaile (Irish)
- Barony
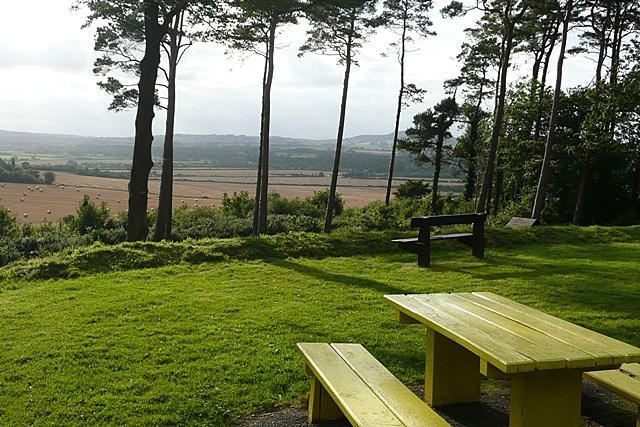
- The ancient Magh Druchtain (plain of sweetness)

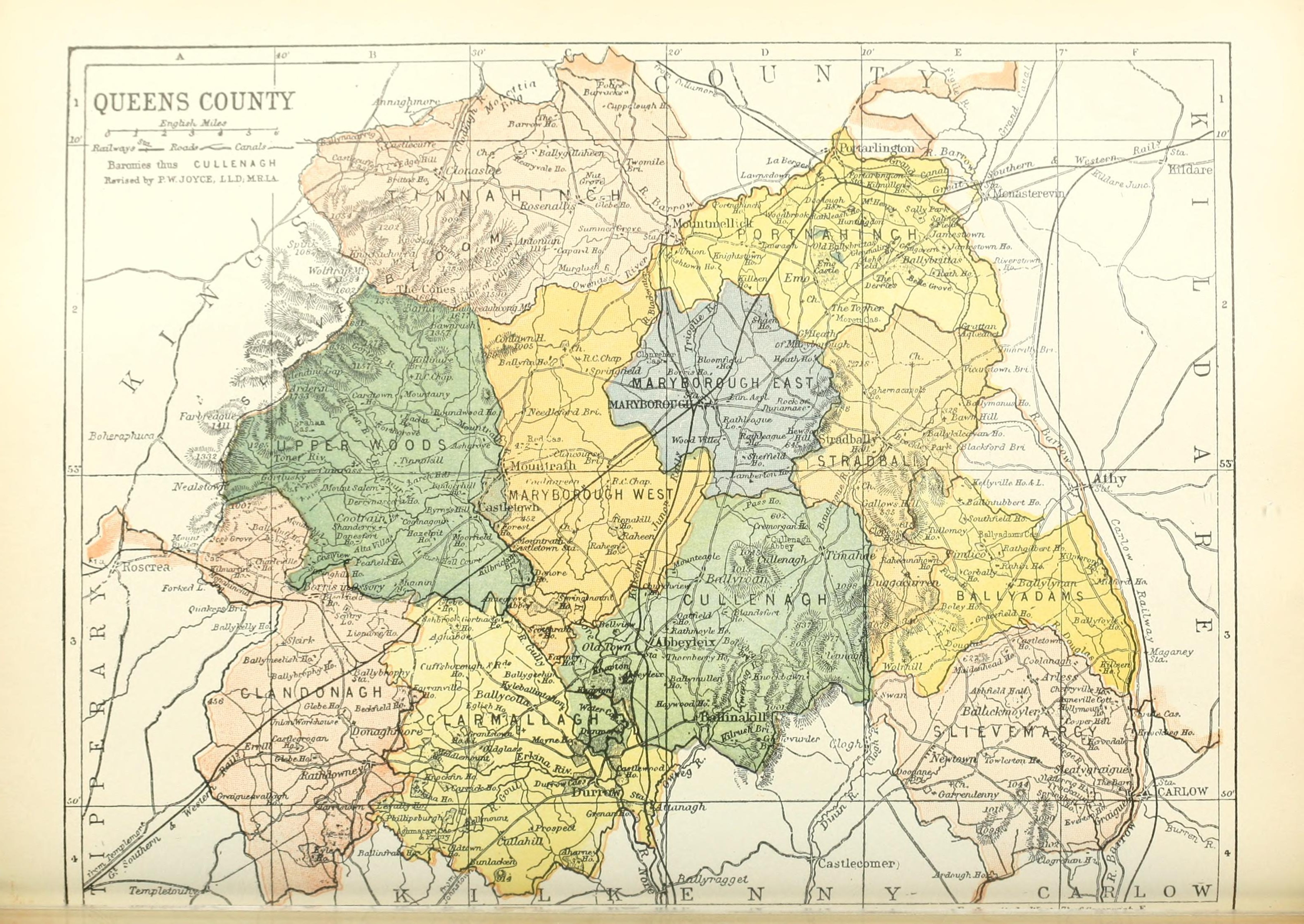
- Barony map of Queen's County, 1900; Stradbally is orange, in the east.
- Sovereign state: Ireland
- Province: Leinster
- County: Laois

Area
  - Total: 112.89 km^{2} (43.59 sq mi)

Stradbally (Irish: An Sráidbhaile) is a barony in County Laois (formerly called Queen's County or County Leix), Ireland.

== Etymology ==
Stradbally barony is named after the town of Stradbally (literally meaning "one-street town").

== Geography ==
Stradbally is located in eastern County Laois, bounded to the south by Luggacurren, to the east by the River Barrow and to the west by Dunamase.

== History ==
Stradbally barony was anciently known as Magh Druchtain ("plain of sweetness") and was ruled by a sept of the Ó Ceallaigh. It was also called Farran-O'Kelly ("men of O'Kelly"). According to the Annals of the Four Masters, in 1394, James Butler, 3rd Earl of Ormond "mustered a force, and marched into Leinster to spoil it; and he burned and spoiled Gailine, and the territory of O'Kelly of Magh Druchtain, and then returned home."

It is referred to in the topographical poem Tuilleadh feasa ar Éirinn óigh (Giolla na Naomh Ó hUidhrín, d. 1420):

Ós Muigh Drúchtain an dúin ghil
Ó Ceallaigh an chláir éignigh
as samhail mín an mhuighe
re Tír ttaraidh tTarrnguire.

("Over Magh-Druchtain of the fair fortress is Ó Ceallaigh of the salmon-full river, Similar is the smooth surface of the plain to the fruitful land of promise.")

Ballyduff was the seat of the Cenél Crimthann, a branch of the Ó hIndreadhain (O'Hourihan).

After the Laois-Offaly Plantation, Stradbally came to Francis Cosby and was for centuries owned by the Cosby family, including William Cosby and Dudley Cosby, 1st Baron Sydney.

== List of settlements ==
Below is a list of settlements in Stradbally barony:

- Stradbally
