= Radeon R430 =

The Radeon R430 chip is a graphics processing unit (GPU) developed by ATI Technologies. This chip from ATI Technologies can be found in some models of the Radeon X800 GTO video card. The Radeon X800 "R430"-based 110 nanometer series was introduced at the end of 2004 along with ATI's new X850 cards. The X800 was designed to replace the position X700 XT failed to secure, with 12 pipelines and a 256-bit RAM bus. The card more than surpassed the 6600GT with performance similar to that of the GeForce 6800. A close relative, the new X800 XL, was positioned to dethrone Nvidia's GeForce 6800 GT with higher memory speeds and a full 16 pipelines to boost performance. R430 was unable to reach high clock speeds, being mainly designed to reduce the cost per graphics processing unit (GPU), and so a new top-of-the-line core was still needed.

== See also ==
- Radeon R420
