= Tinnahinch (barony) =

Tinnahinch Tigh na hInse (Irish)
- Barony
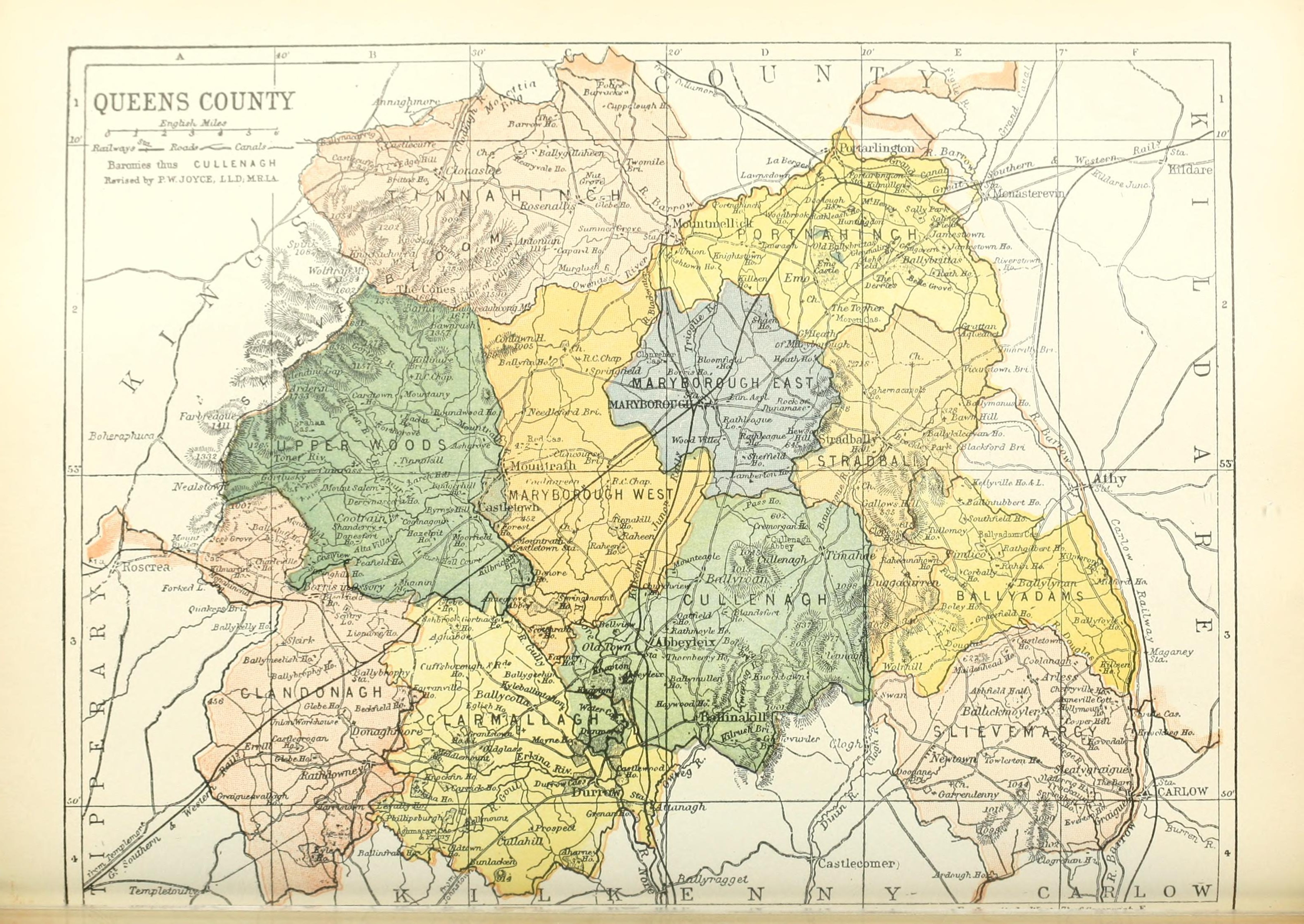
- Barony map of Queen's County, 1900; Tinnahinch is pink, in the northwest.
- Sovereign state: Ireland
- Province: Leinster
- County: Laois

Area
  - Total: 219.29 km^{2} (84.67 sq mi)

Tinnahinch (Irish: Tigh na hInse) is a barony in County Laois (formerly called Queen's County or County Leix), in Ireland.

== History ==
The southern part of Tinnahinch was called Gailine, and it is mentioned in the topographical poem Tuilleadh feasa ar Éirinn óigh (Giolla na Naomh Ó hUidhrín, d. 1420):

Early Modern Irish version

Ar Uíbh Riagáin na ruag ttrom
gasraidh mhear mhuidheas comhlonn;
Ó Duinn, taoiseach na toghla,
cuing na ccraoiseach ccathordha.

English version

"Over Uí Riagain of heavy routs,
a vigorous tribe who fought in battle,
is O'Duinn, chief of demolition,
Hero of the golden battle-spears."

== List of settlements ==
Settlements in Tinnahinch barony:

- Clonaghadoo
- Clonaslee
- Mountmellick
- Rosenallis
