= Crettyard =

Hamlet in County Laois, Ireland

Crettyard Crochta Ard
- Hamlet
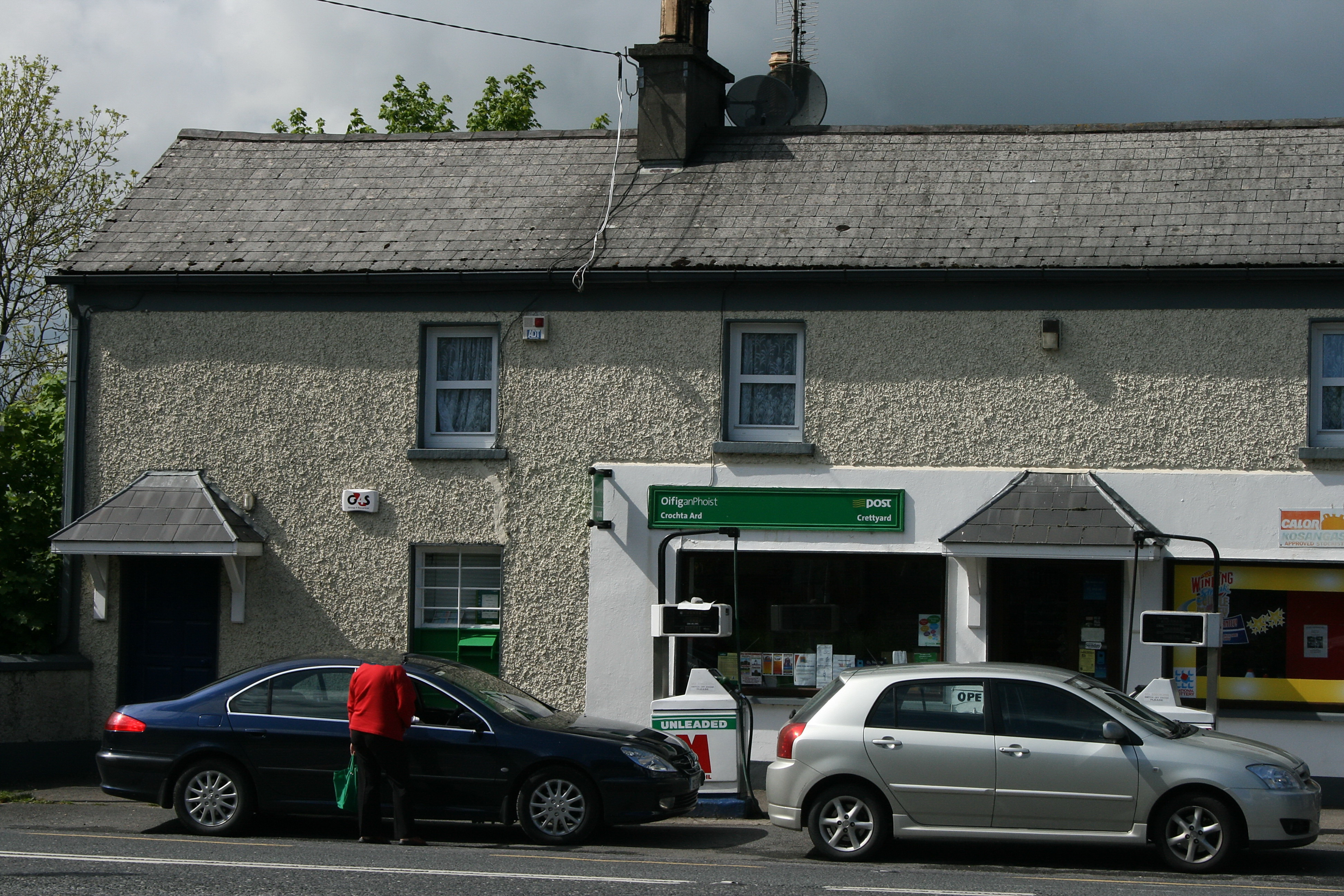
- Crettyard Post Office

- Location in Ireland
- Coordinates: 52°50′30.7″N 7°7′39.8″W
- Country: Ireland
- Province: Leinster
- County: County Laois
- Time zone: UTC+0 (WET)
  - Summer (DST): UTC-1 (IST (WEST))

Crettyard (Irish: Crochta Ard, meaning 'the high croft') is a hamlet in County Laois, Ireland. It is on the border with County Kilkenny, at the junction of the N78 and the R431 roads. Carlow town is 14 km to the east, and Kilkenny city is 22 km to the south.

== Education ==
Schools serving the area include Newtown National School and Mayo National School.

== Sports ==
=== Athletics ===
The local athletics club, St Abban's AC, was established in 1955. The club has had a number of successes at county, provincial and national level throughout the years producing international athletes such as Barry Pender (High Jump), Paul Byrne (400mH), Brian Kelly (800m), Eoin Kelly (Triple Jump), Saragh Buggy (Triple Jump), Nessa Millet (400mh - National Junior Record Holder 2013), and Ruby Millet (Long Jump - National Junior Indoor Record Holder - 2019). The club's facility is located just off the Carlow - Castlecomer Rd and consists of a cinder style 400 m (1,300 ft) track with tartan on LJ, TJ, PV and HJ areas. It also has a 1.4 km (0.87 mi) loop for longer distances.

=== Gaelic games ===
The village is home to Crettyard GAA club.

=== Soccer ===
Crettyard United compete in the Carlow premier division. They have won the division on several occasions. They also compete in the Leinster Senior Cup.

== See also ==
- List of towns and villages in Ireland
