= Portnahinch =

Barony in County Laois, Ireland

Portnahinch Port na hInse (Irish)
- Barony
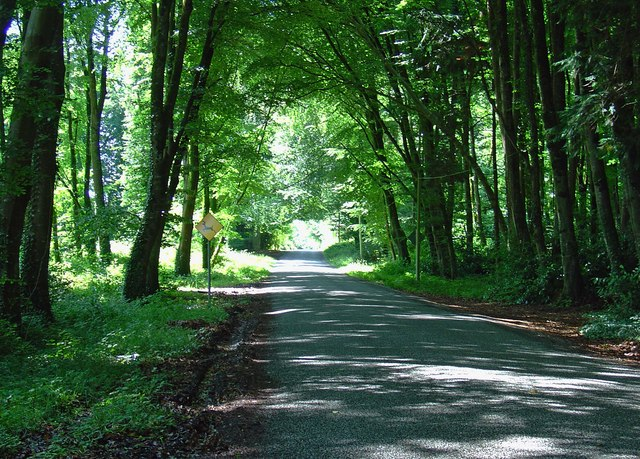
- Forest road near Emo

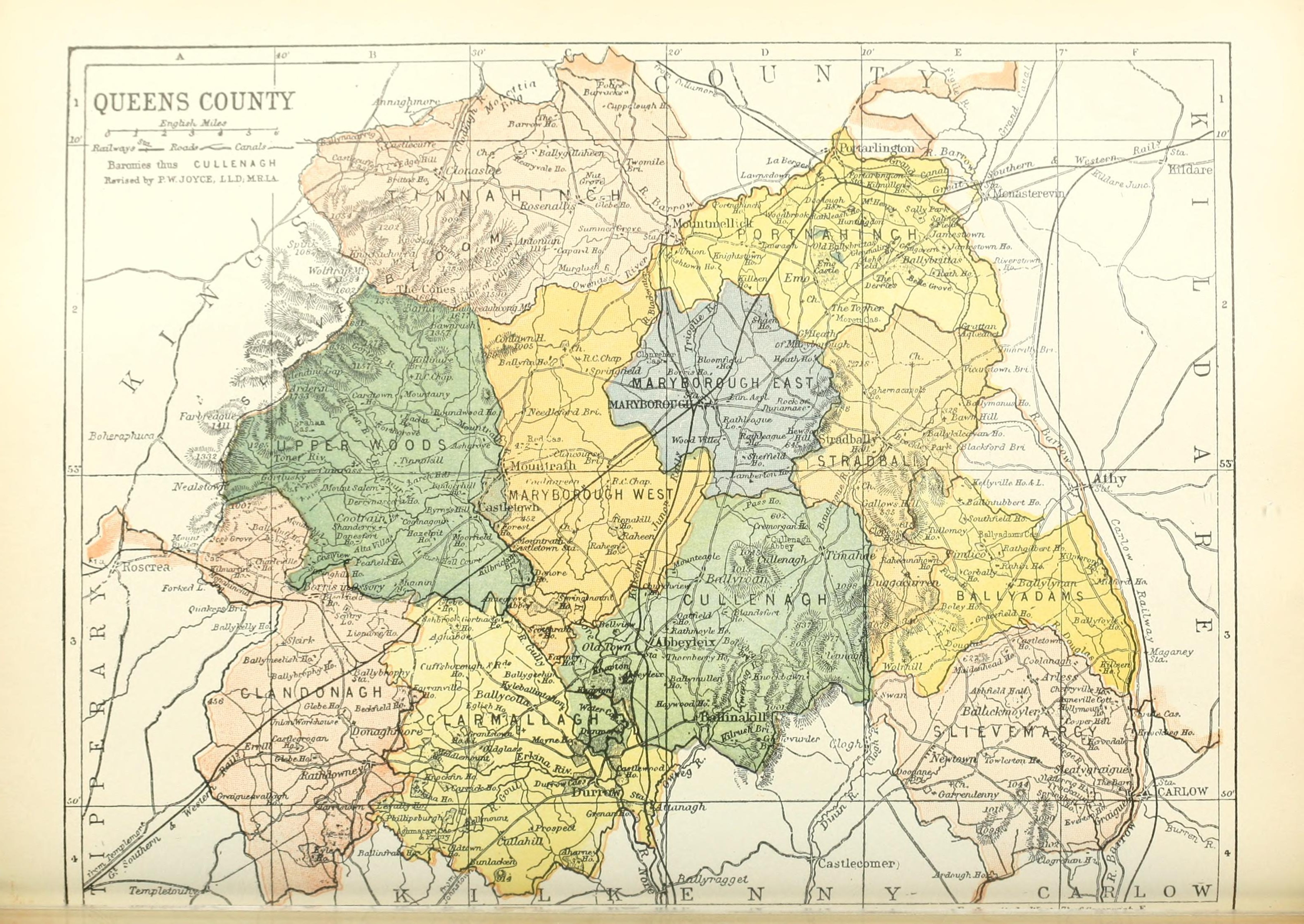
- Barony map of Queen's County, 1900; Portnahinch is yellow, in the northeast.
- Sovereign state: Ireland
- Province: Leinster
- County: Laois

Area
  - Total: 145.02 km^{2} (55.99 sq mi)

Portnahinch or Portnehinch (Irish: Port na hInse is a barony in County Laois (formerly called Queen's County or County Leix), Ireland.

== Etymology ==
The barony is named after the townland of Portnahinch (Port na hInse; "port of the island").

== Geography ==
Portnahinch is located in the northeastern part of County Laois.

== History ==
Portnahinch formed part of the ancient Kingdom of Uí Failghe.

== List of settlements ==
Below is a list of settlements in Portnahinch barony:

- Ballybrittas
- Emo
- Mountmellick
- Portarlington
