= The Swan, County Laois =

Village in County Laois, Ireland

The Swan An Eala
- Village
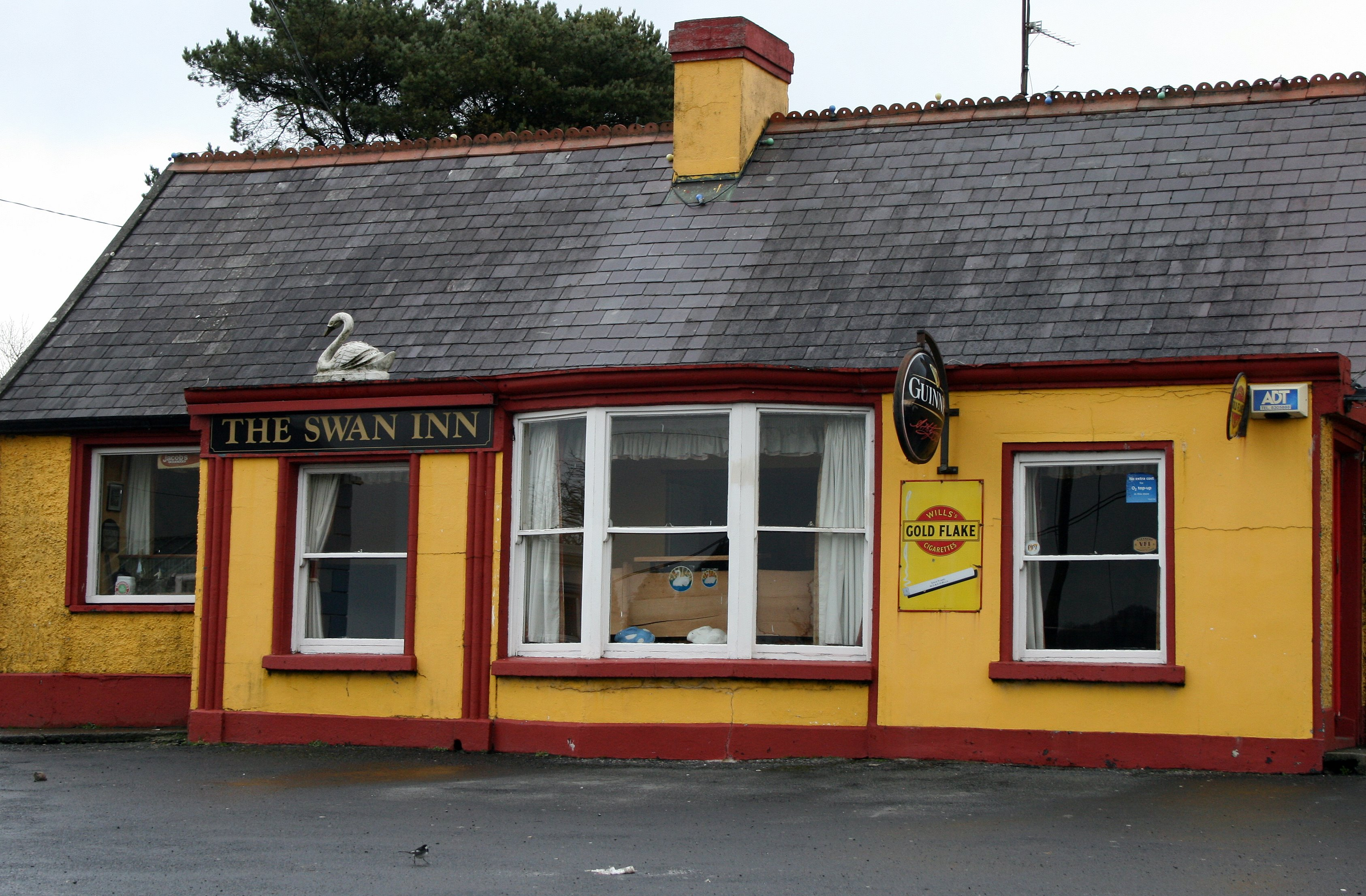
- The Swan Inn, from which the village takes its name

- Location in Ireland
- Coordinates: 52°53′20″N 7°09′37″W
- Country: Ireland
- Province: Leinster
- County: County Laois
- Time zone: UTC+0 (WET)
  - Summer (DST): UTC-1 (IST (WEST))
- Irish Grid Reference: S563825

Swan or The Swan (Irish: an Eala) is a small village in County Laois, Ireland. Around 20 km south-east of Portlaoise, it lies near the County Kilkenny border where the R430 regional road crosses the R426. The village lies within the townland of Slatt (Lower), in the civil parish of Rathaspick.

== History ==
The Swan is a relatively "new" village in County Laois, and is named after a local public house, The Swan Inn. A fire clay factory was opened in the area in 1935 to take advantage of local fire clay deposits.

== Amenities ==
The village is largely linear, developed along the R430 regional road. There are no shops in the village, and it is served primarily by the pub, and a community centre in the centre of the village. Other community amenities include an outdoor playground and playing pitches. The local national (primary) school is Swan National School.

== Economy ==
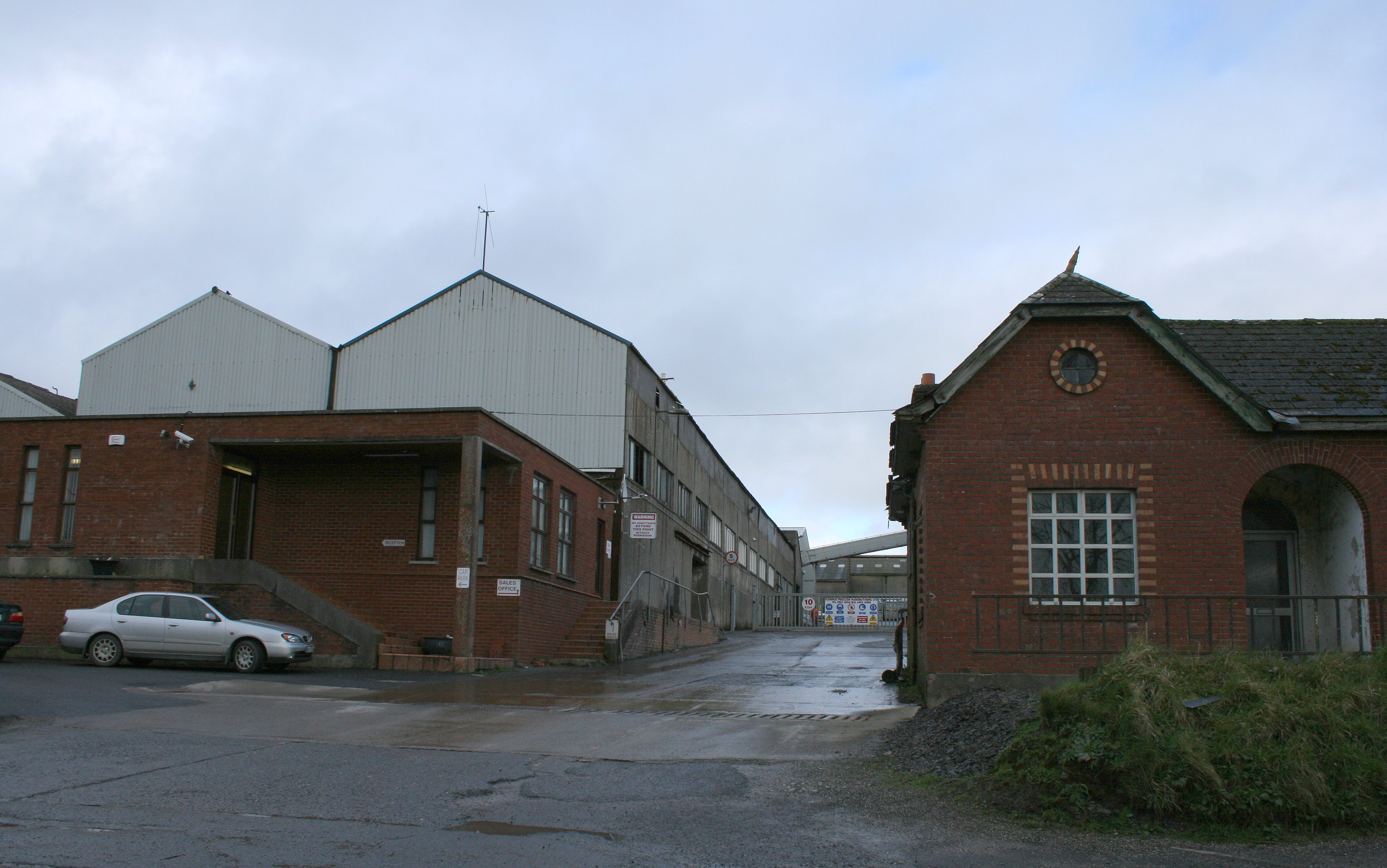
Fleming's brick factory at The Swan

Fleming's Fireclays was started by PJ Fleming in 1935. It generated employment for the village and the surrounding areas and provided housing for many of its workers. These houses constituted nearly all the dwellings in the village until 2003, when two new housing projects began and the number of houses has almost doubled as a result. The factory utilises fireclay, which is an abundant local resource, to make bricks and chimney flues. The factory was rebranded as Lagan Brick when Flemings Fireclay was absorbed into the Lagan Group.

== Sport ==
St Joseph's is the local Gaelic Athletic Association club and takes its players from Luggacurren, Wolfhill and Ballyadams. Some players of note from the Swan have included Tom Kelly and Joe Higgins, both of whom received GAA All Stars Awards in 2003. Joe Higgins also won several boxing titles, including nine Leinster and two All-Ireland boxing titles.

The local soccer team, Wolfhill Athletic, play in the Premier Division of the Carlow League. In the 2004/2005 season, the club won the Carlow Challenge cup. There is also an Over 35's team which has won their league in 2006/2007, 2008/2009 and 2009/2010.

Former jockey turned trainer, Kevin O'Brien, has established a stable in the area.

== See also ==
- List of towns and villages in Ireland
