= Newtown, County Laois =

Village in County Laois, Ireland

Newtown
- Village
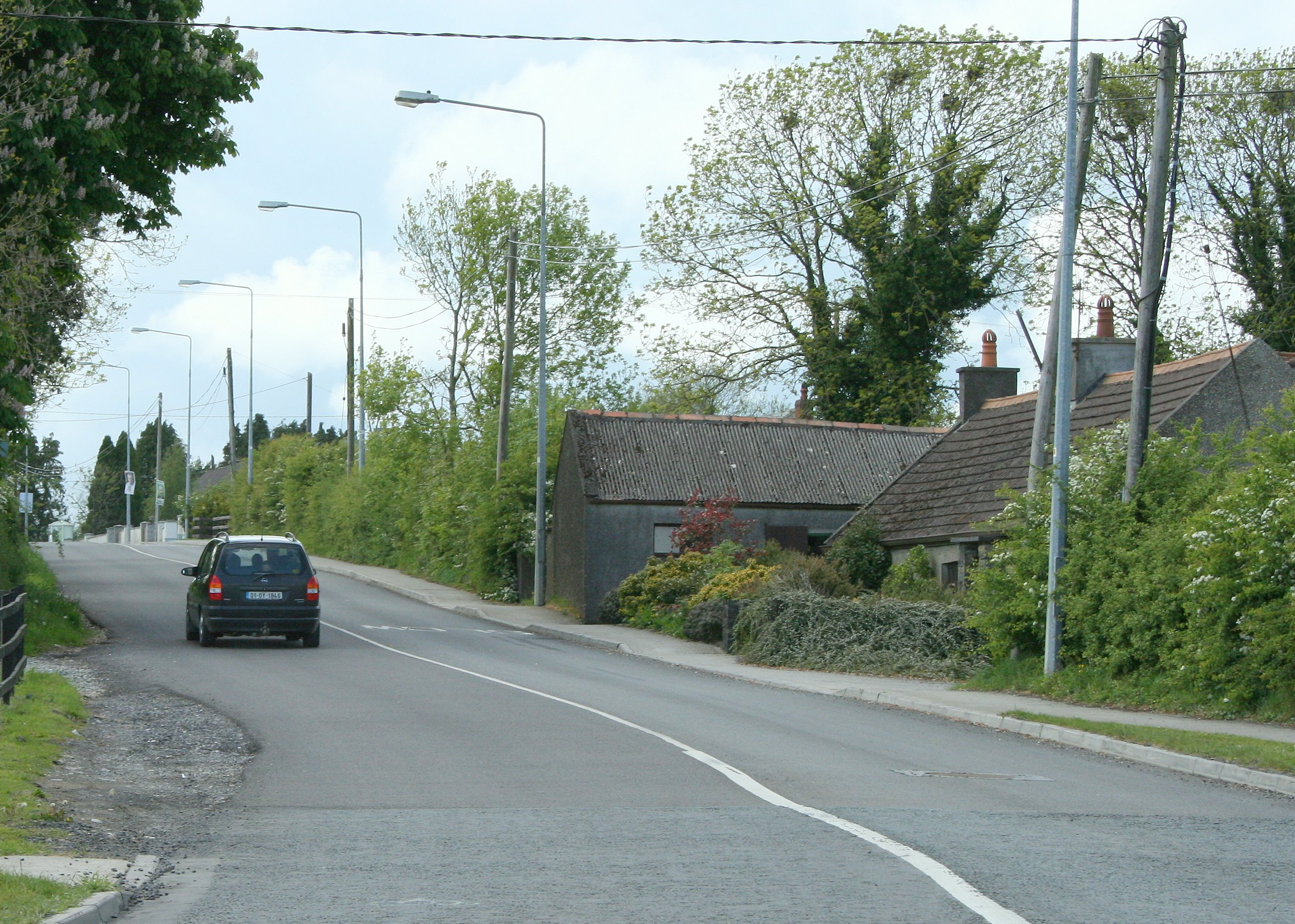
- Newtown on the R430

- Location in Ireland
- Coordinates: 52°51′44″N 7°06′44″W
- Country: Ireland
- Province: Leinster
- County: County Laois

Population (2016)
  - Total: 269

Newtown or Newtown Cross (Irish: Baile Nua) is a village in County Laois, Ireland. It is within the townlands of Clonbrock (Cluain Broc) and Doonane (Dúnán).

Newtown lies close to the border between Counties Laois and Kilkenny at the point where the R430 regional road from Abbeyleix to Carlow crosses the N78 from Kilkenny to Athy. The village is 12 km west of Carlow town. As of the 2016 census, the village had a population of 269 people.

The local Gaelic Athletic Association club, Crettyard, has its grounds and clubhouse at Newtown Cross.

== See also ==
- List of towns and villages in Ireland
