= County Laois =

County in Ireland

Coordinates: 53°00′N 7°24′W

County Laois Contae Laoise
- County
- Coat of arms
- Nickname: The O'Moore County
- Motto: Irish: I bpáirt leis an bpobal "In partnership with the community"
- Interactive map of County Laois
- Country: Ireland
- Province: Leinster
- Region: Eastern and Midland
- Established: 1556
- County town: Portlaoise

Government
  - Local authority: Laois County Council
  - Dáil constituency: Laois
  - EP constituency: South

Area
  - Total: 1,720 km^{2} (660 sq mi)
  - Rank: 23rd
- Highest elevation (Arderin): 527 m (1,729 ft)

Population (2022)
  - Total: 91,657
  - Rank: 23rd
  - Density: 53.3/km^{2} (138/sq mi)
- Time zone: UTC±0 (WET)
  - Summer (DST): UTC+1 (IST)
- Eircode routing keys: R32 (primarily)
- Telephone area codes: 057 (primarily)
- ISO 3166 code: IE-LS
- Vehicle index mark code: LS
- Website: Official website

County Laois (/liːʃ/ LEESH; Irish: Contae Laoise) is a county in Ireland. It is part of the Eastern and Midland Region and in the province of Leinster. It was known as Queen's County from 1556 to 1922. The modern county takes its name from Loígis, a medieval kingdom. Historically, it has also been known as County Leix.

Laois County Council is the local authority for the county, and is based in Portlaoise.

At the 2022 census, the population of the county was 91,657, an increase of 56% since the 2002 census.

== History ==
=== Prehistoric ===
The first people in Laois were bands of hunters and gatherers who passed through the county about 8,500 years ago. They hunted in the forests that covered Laois and fished in its rivers, gathering nuts and berries to supplement their diets.

Next came Ireland's first farmers. These people of the Neolithic period (4000 to 2500 BC) cleared forests and planted crops. Their burial mounds remain in Clonaslee and Cuffsborough.

Starting around 2500 BC, the people of the Bronze Age lived in Laois. They produced weapons, tools, and golden objects. Visitors to the county can see a stone circle they left behind at Monamonry, as well as the remains of their hill forts at Clopook and Monelly. Skirk, near Borris-in-Ossory, has a Bronze Age standing stone and ring fort. The body of Cashel Man indicates that ritual killing took place around 2000 BC.

The next stage is known as the pre-Christian Celtic Iron Age. For the first time, iron appeared in Ireland, showing up in the weapons used by factions who fought bloody battles for control of the land. At Ballydavis, archaeologists have discovered ring barrows that date from this time period.

The county name derives from Loígis, of which the modern county is only a part. In the 11th century, its dynastic rulers adopted the surname Ua/Ó Mórdha. They claimed descent from a member of the Red Branch Knights.

By the first century AD, the western third of Laois was part of the Kingdom of Ossory. The eastern part was roughly divided into seven parts, which were ruled by the Seven Septs of Loígis:Ua/Ó Mórdha (O'More, O'Moore), O'Lalor, O'Doran, O'Dowling, O'Devoy (O'Deevy), O'Kelly and McEvoy.

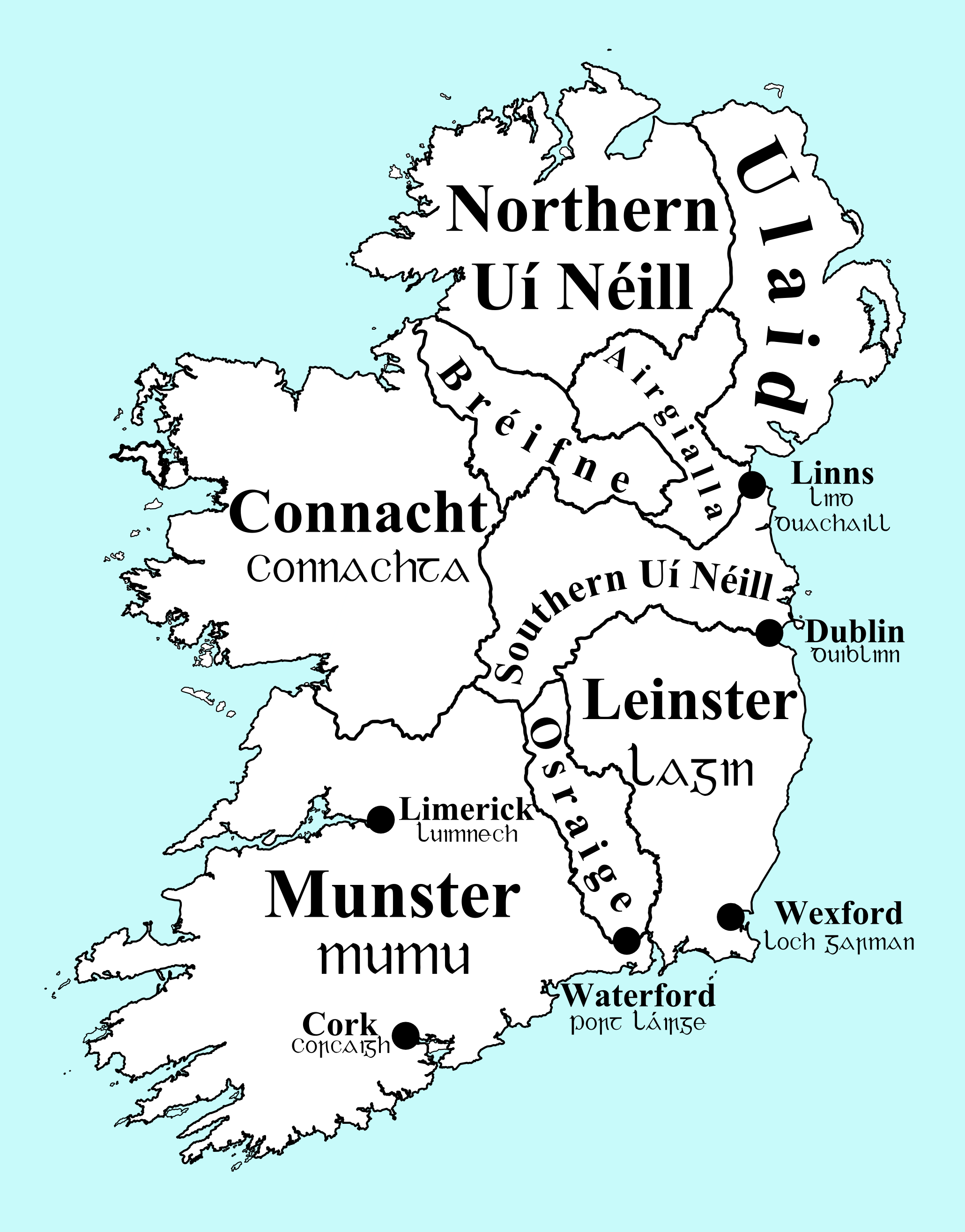
Map of Ireland around 900 AD. The western third of Laois was part of the Kingdom of Osraige.

=== Introduction of Christianity ===
When Ireland was Christianised, holy men and women founded religious communities in Loígis. St. Ciarán of Saighir (called "The Elder" to distinguish him from the younger St. Ciarán of Clonmacnoise) founded his monastic habitation in the western Slieve Bloom Mountains as the first bishop of Ossory, reputedly before St. Patrick. His mother Liadán had an early convent nearby at what is now Killyon. Between 550 and 600, St. Canice founded Aghaboe Abbey and St. Mochua founded a religious community at Timahoe. An early Christian community lived at Dun Masc or Masc's fort, on the Rock of Dunamase.

The Synod of Rathbreasail that established the Irish dioceses was held near Mountrath in 1111, moving the Church away from its monastic base. As religious orders with strong ties to Rome replaced older religious communities, the wooden buildings of the early Christian churches in Laois gave way to stone monasteries. The Augustinians and Dominicans established themselves at Aghaboe Abbey, while the Cistercians took over an older religious community at Abbeyleix.

=== Norman invasion ===
The Norman invasion of Ireland in 1169–71 affected Laois as it was a part of the Kingdom of Leinster. In Laois, the fortress on the Rock of Dunamase was part of the dowry of the Irish princess Aoife, who was given in marriage in 1170 to the Norman warrior Strongbow. Advancing Normans surveyed the county from wooden towers built on top of earthen mounds, known as mottes. They also built stone fortresses, such as Lea Castle, just outside Portarlington. Several of the county's towns were first established as Norman boroughs, including Castletown, Durrow and Timahoe.

From 1175 until about 1325, Normans controlled the best land in the county, while Gaelic society retreated to the bogs, forests and the Slieve Bloom Mountains. The early 14th century saw a Gaelic revival, as the chieftains of Loígis caused the Normans to withdraw. The Dempseys seized Lea Castle, while Dunamase came into the ownership of the O’Mores. Examples of tower houses built by the Irish Mac Giolla Phádraig chieftains are found at Ballaghmore and Cullahill Castle, both decorated with Sheela na gigs.

In 1548, the English confiscated the lands of the O’Mores and built "Campa", known as the Fort of Leix, today's Portlaoise.

=== 16th century colony and County status ===
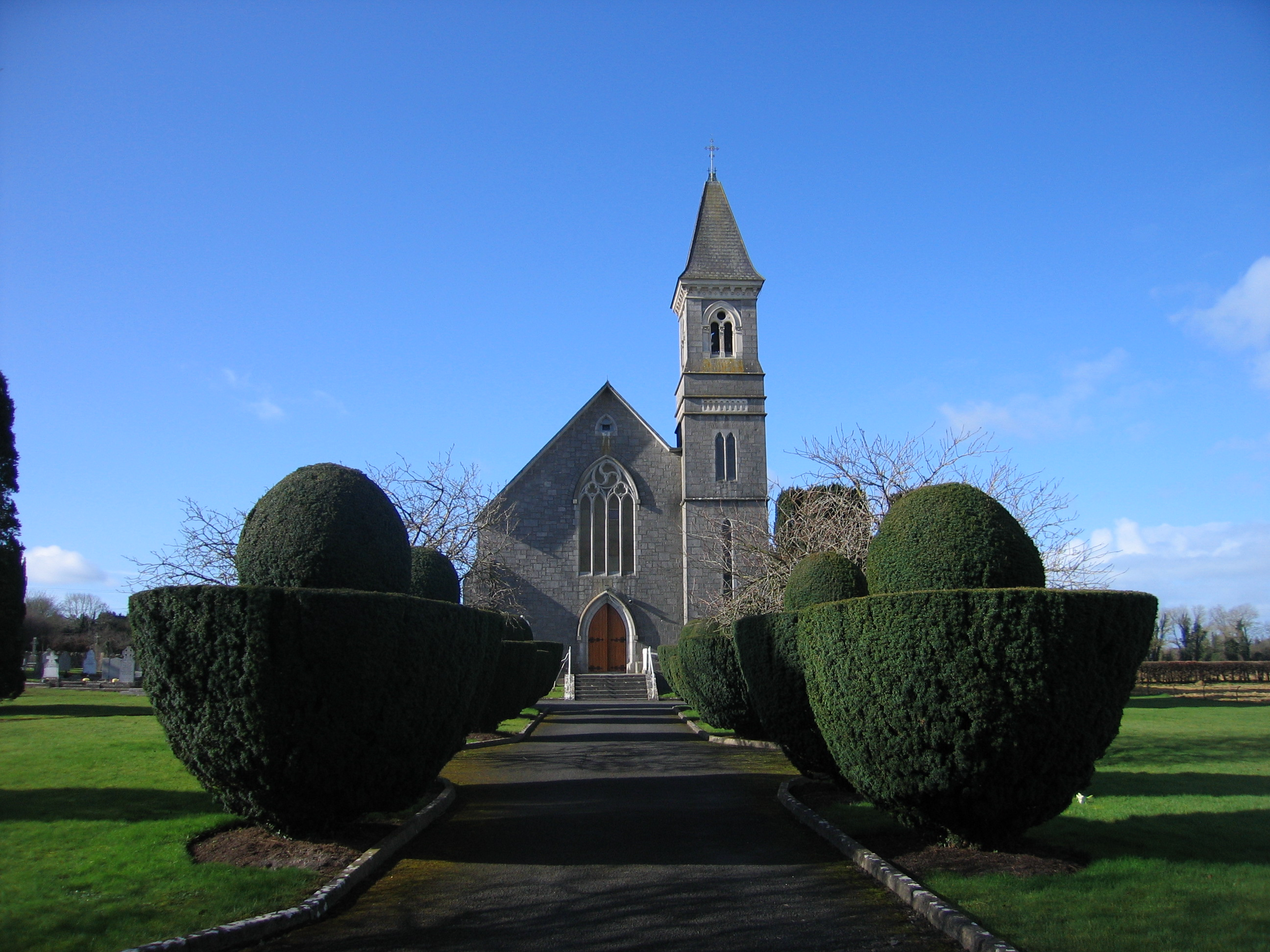
A church in Emo

Historical population
Year	Pop.	±%
1500	6,557	—
1510	8,378	+27.8%
1550	11,222	+33.9%
1580	15,301	+36.3%
1585	16,435	+7.4%
1600	6,828	−58.5%
1610	7,990	+17.0%
1653	9,915	+24.1%
1659	11,115	+12.1%
1672	13,589	+22.3%
1680	17,777	+30.8%
1690	21,255	+19.6%
1700	24,713	+16.3%
1710	27,689	+12.0%
1725	32,808	+18.5%
1735	41,577	+26.7%
1745	41,097	−1.2%
1755	40,888	−0.5%
1765	51,286	+25.4%
1771	58,411	+13.9%
1775	67,870	+16.2%
1788	76,903	+13.3%
1790	93,679	+21.8%
1801	95,820	+2.3%
1811	111,227	+16.1%
1813	108,950	−2.0%
1816	122,888	+12.8%
1821	134,275	+9.3%
1831	145,851	+8.6%
1841	153,930	+5.5%
1851	111,664	−27.5%
1861	90,650	−18.8%
1871	79,771	−12.0%
1881	73,124	−8.3%
1891	64,883	−11.3%
1901	57,417	−11.5%
1911	54,629	−4.9%
1926	51,540	−5.7%
1936	50,109	−2.8%
1946	49,697	−0.8%
1951	48,430	−2.5%
1956	47,087	−2.8%
1961	45,069	−4.3%
1966	44,595	−1.1%
1971	45,259	+1.5%
1979	49,936	+10.3%
1981	51,171	+2.5%
1986	53,284	+4.1%
1991	52,314	−1.8%
1996	52,945	+1.2%
2002	58,774	+11.0%
2006	67,059	+14.1%
2011	80,559	+20.1%
2016	84,697	+5.1%
2022	91,657	+8.2%

It was shired in 1556 by Queen Mary as Queen's County, covering the countries of Leix (Loígis), Slewmarge, Irry, and that part of Glimnaliry on the southwest side of the River Barrow. Laois received its present Irish language name following the Irish War of Independence. Laois was also sometimes spelt "Leix". Portlaoise (previously Maryborough) is the main town of the county.

Loígis was the subject of two organised plantations or colonisations by the Kingdom of England in 1556 and 1607. During the first plantation, Thomas Radclyffe, 3rd Earl of Sussex attempted to dispossess the ruling O'Moore clan, who had been engaging in costly raids on The Pale, and settle the area with English colonists. However, this led to a long drawn-out guerrilla war in the county and left only a small colonist community clustered around garrisons. This initial attempt at plantation is widely regarded as a failure by historians, as occupying the territory was far more costly than the money yielded from it, and the scheme attracted fewer settlers than anticipated.

The second, more successful plantation of the county took place in the aftermath of the Nine Years' War, and expanded the existing English settlements with more landowners and tenants. In 1659, a group of Quakers led by William Edmundson, settled in Mountmellick, while a group of Huguenots were given refuge in Portarlington in 1696 after their service to William of Orange in the Williamite War in Ireland.

What followed was a period of relative calm. Anglo-Irish landowners enclosed the land and built fine houses, including Durrow Castle, Heywood House and Emo Court. In 1836, a branch of the Grand Canal stretched to Mountmellick, further stimulating industry in that town.

The Great Famine of 1845–49 devastated the county. The county's workhouses could not cope with the number of destitute people seeking shelter. By the time the workhouse opened at Donaghmore in 1853, many of the poorest had emigrated or died.

The English language was already dominant in much of Leinster by the time of the famine, but the Irish language was still spoken in Laois as late as the 1870s.

The county was known as Queen's County (Irish: Contae na Banríona) from 1556 until its name was informally changed on the establishment of the Irish Free State in 1922. The county's name was formerly spelt as Laoighis and Leix. In the Local Government Act 2001, it is named in the list of counties as Laois, although no legislation was enacted explicitly changing the name from Queen's County, the name formally established under the Local Government (Ireland) Act 1898 which continued to have legal effect. When land is sold in the county the relevant title deeds are still updated as being in Queen's County.

== Geography and subdivisions ==
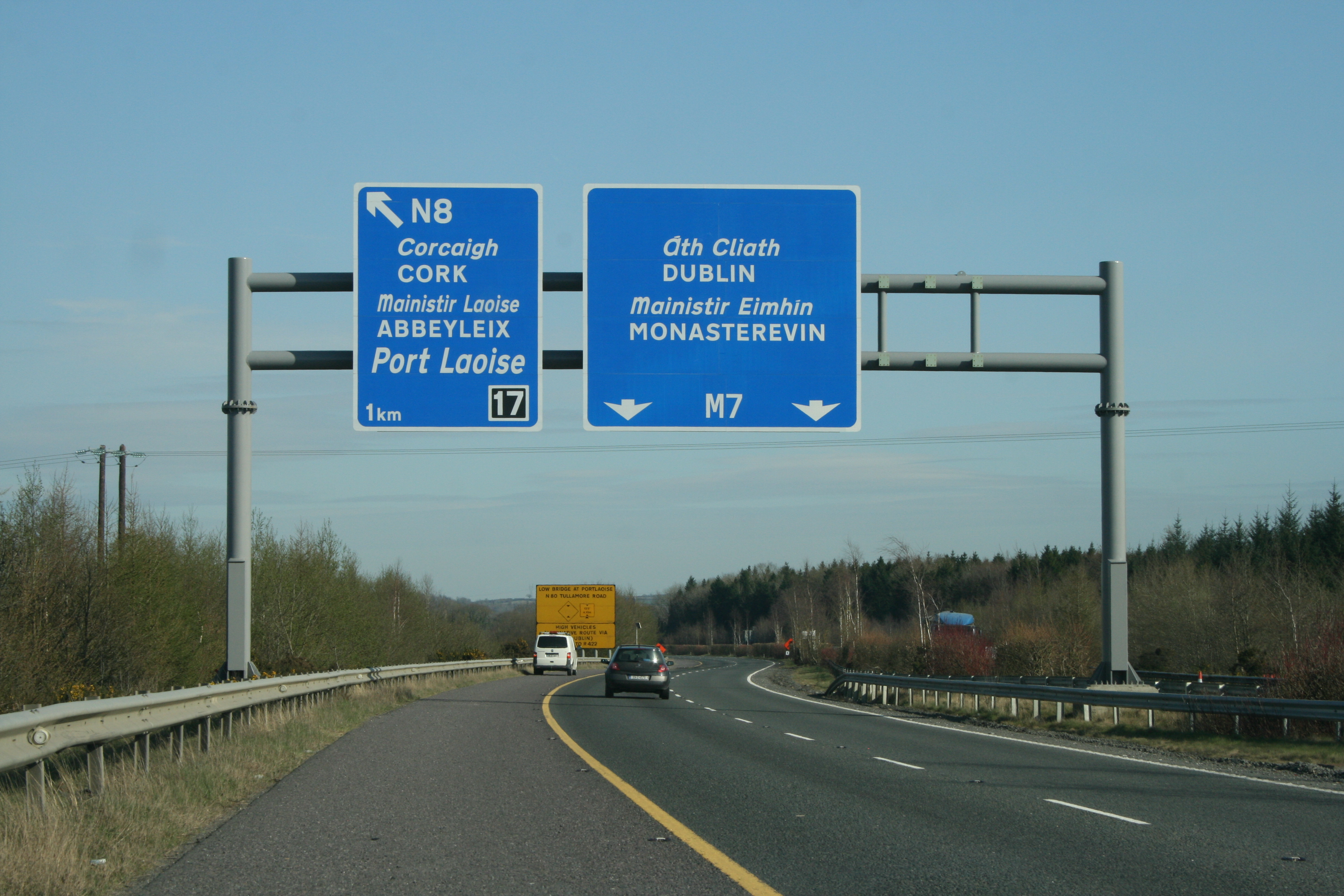
The M7 near Portlaoise

Laois is the 23rd in both in area and population of Ireland's 32 counties. It is the seventh-largest of Leinster's 12 counties in size and tenth largest in population. The county is landlocked and, uniquely, is doubly landlocked, not bordering any other county which touches the coast.

=== Baronies ===
The county was formerly divided into nine baronies:

- Ballyadams
- Cullenagh
- Maryborough East
- Maryborough West
- Portnehinch
- Slievemargy
- Stradbally
- Tinnahinch
- Upper Ossory (later divided into Upper Woods, Clarmallagh and Clandonagh)

=== Towns and villages ===
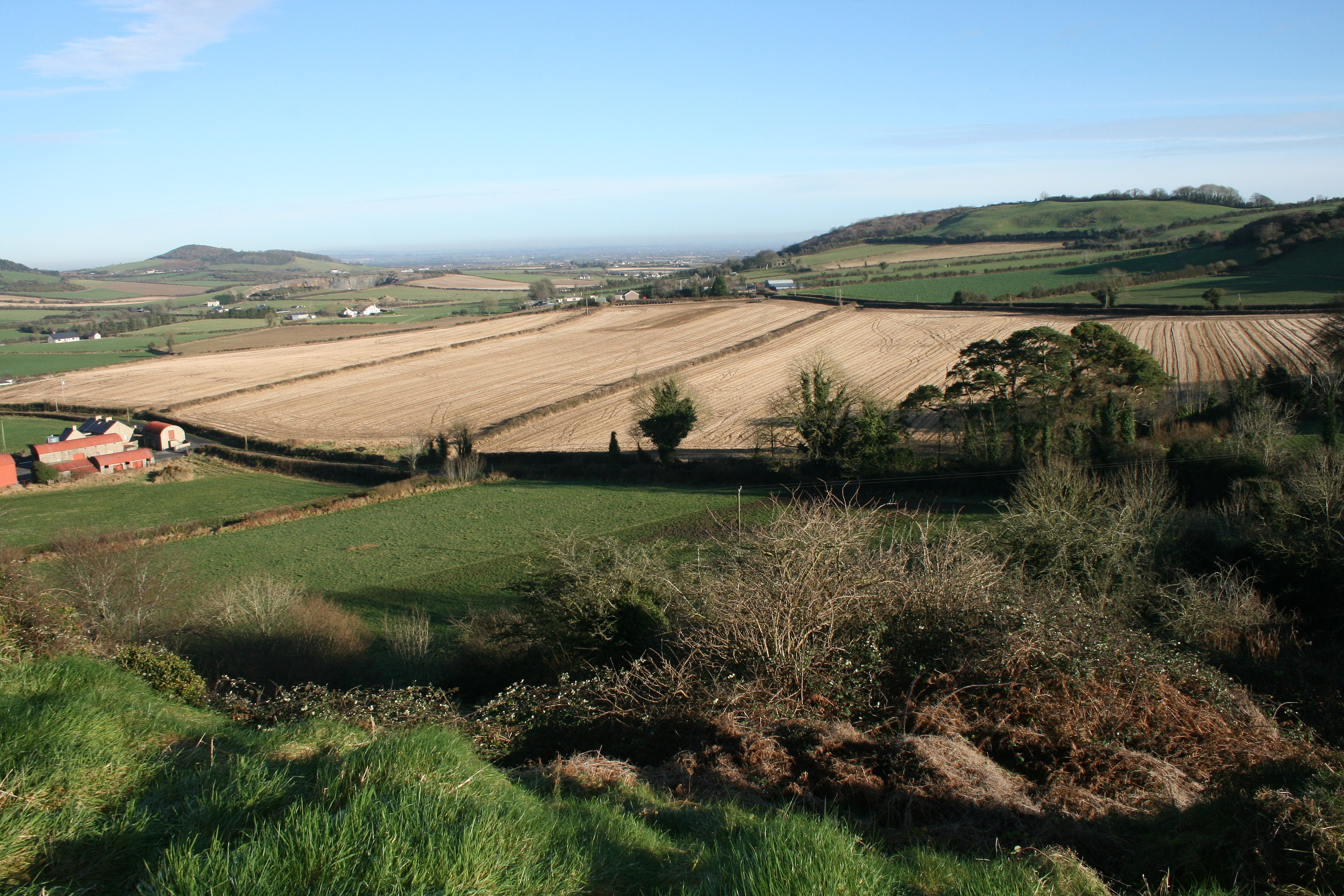
Countryside south of Portlaoise

- Abbeyleix
- Aghaboe
- Arles
- Ballacolla
- Ballaghmore
- Ballickmoyler
- Ballinakill
- Ballybrittas
- Ballybrophy
- Ballyhide
- Ballyfin
- Ballylinan
- Ballyroan
- Barrowhouse
- Borris-in-Ossory
- Camross
- Castletown
- Clonaghadoo
- Clonaslee
- Coolrain
- Cullahill
- Donaghmore
- Durrow
- Emo
- Errill
- The Heath
- Jamestown
- Killeshin
- Mountmellick
- Mountrath
- Newtown
- Pike of Rushall
- Portarlington
- Portlaoise
- Raheen
- Rathdowney
- Rosenallis
- Shanahoe
- Stradbally
- The Swan
- Timahoe
- Vicarstown

=== Climate ===
For climatological information see: durrow.ie for averages and extremes.

The weather station at Durrow was set up in May 2008. The equipment used is a Davis Vantage Pro II that measures temperature, humidity, wind speed, wind direction, rainfall and barometric pressure. This data is transmitted every 2 seconds to a website where the data can be freely accessed. The station also reports to the Irish Weather Network which displays live weather data from similar stations all around Ireland.

In addition, a Met Éireann climatological station (Number: 472) was installed in September 2010 and the data collected is sent to Met Éireann in Glasnevin, Dublin on a monthly basis. The climatological station measures rainfall in a manual gauge, air temperature including wet-bulb, and daily maximum and daily minimum temperatures. The climatological station is a project that is envisaged to last thirty years and collect a climate profile for Durrow and Laois in general.

== Governance and politics ==
=== Local government ===
The island of Ireland, showing location of County Laois.

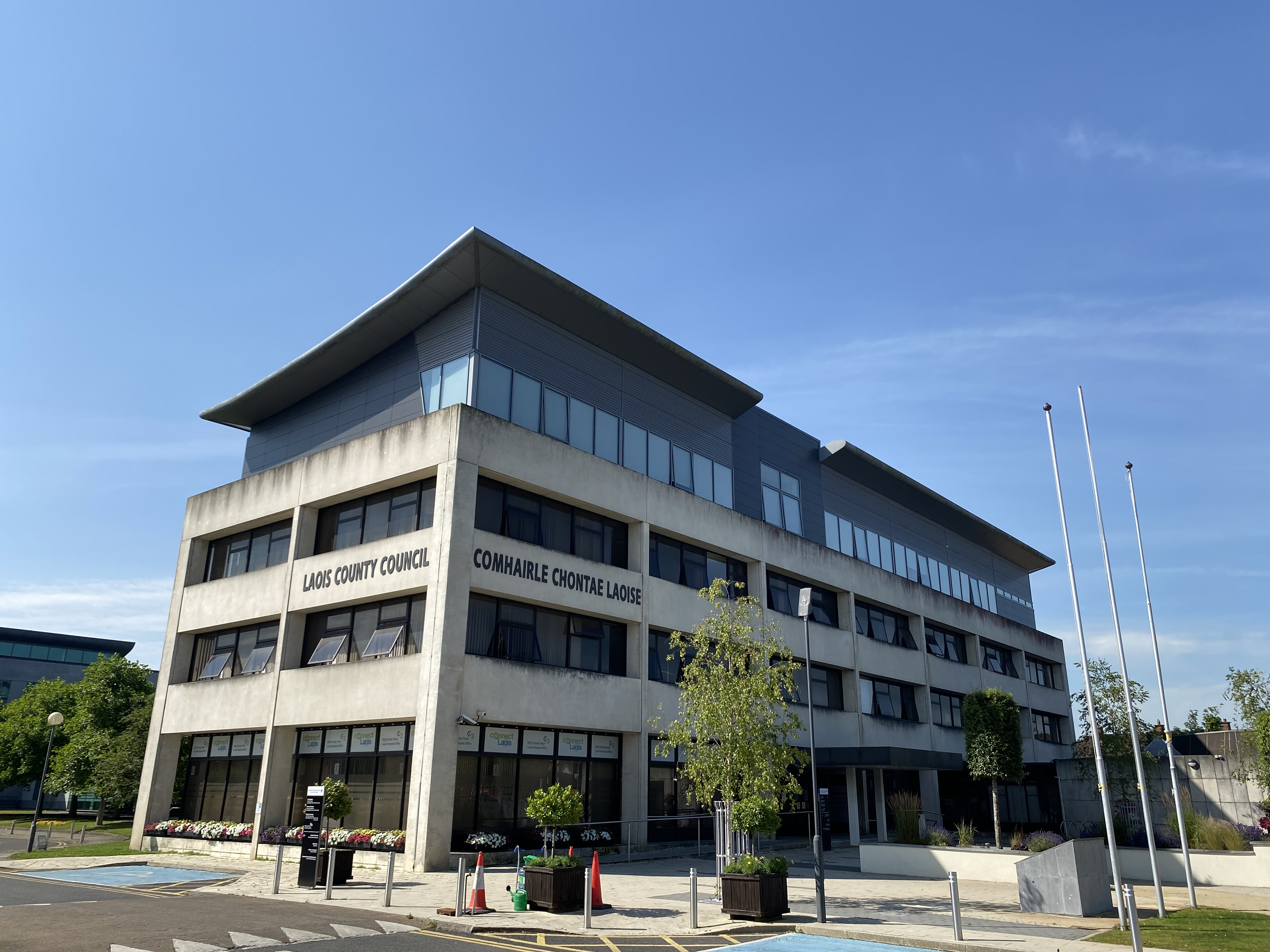
County Hall, Portlaoise

Laois County Council is the local authority governing County Laois. It has 19 councillors, and is divided into three local electoral areas, each of which is also a municipal district: Borris-in-Ossory-Mountmellick (6), Graiguecullen-Portarlington (6), and Portlaoise (7).

The council has two representatives on the Eastern and Midland Regional Assembly where it is part of the Midland strategic planning area.

=== Former districts ===
It was formerly divided into the rural districts of Abbeyleix, Athy No. 2, Mountmellick, Roscrea No. 3, and Slievemargy. The rural districts were abolished in 1925. Mountmellick and Portlaoise, within the former rural district of Mountmellick, had town commissioners. These became town councils in 2002. All town councils in Ireland were abolished in 2014.

=== National politics ===
Most of County Laois is part of the Dáil constituency of Laois–Offaly (5 seats), with the electoral divisions of Ballybrittas, Jamestown, Kilmullen, Portarlington South, in the former rural district of Mountmellick, in the Kildare South constituency. The constituency of Laois–Offaly existed from 1921 to 2016, and again from 2020 to 2024. In the 2016 to 2020 period, there was a separate constituency of Laois (3 seats) which was revived in 2024.

It is part of the European Parliament constituency of Midlands–North-West (5 seats).

== Places of interest ==
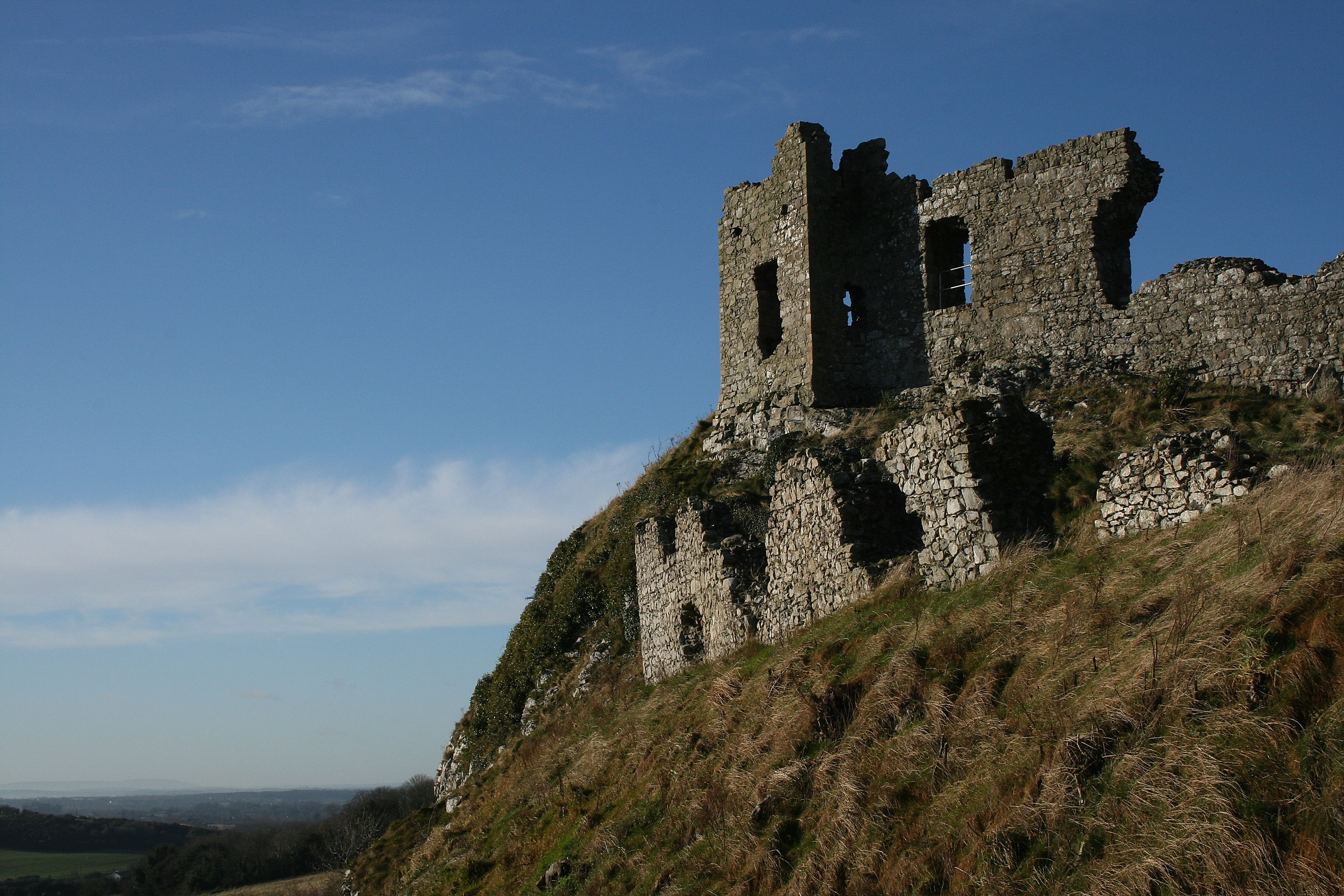
Rock of Dunamase

- Slieve Bloom Mountains
- Rock of Dunamase
- Emo Court
- Castle Durrow
- Timahoe Round Tower
- Stradbally Hall
- Mountmellick Quaker Museum
- Ballyfin House
- Dunamaise Arts Centre, Portlaoise
- Tinnakill Castle
- Abbeyleix Bog Project
- Heywood gardens(Lutyens)

County Laois also has a mixture of castles, mansions, forts and old structures that are now in ruins but are still worth visiting.

== Demography ==
The population of County Laois is expanding, given its easy commute to the employment centres of Kildare and Dublin. Laois's population growth during the period 2002–2006 (14%) was stronger than the national average (8.2%), as follows:

- 2002 ... 58,774
- 2006 ... 67,012 ... +14.01%
- 2011 ... 80,559
- 2016 ... 84,697

As of the 2016 census, ethnically Laois was 84% white Irish, 8% other white, 2% black, 1% Asian, 1% 'other', with 3% not stated.

As of the 2022 census, County Laois had a usual resident population of 91,284. Of these, 79.0% identified as White Irish, 0.9% as White Irish Travellers, and 9.2% as Other White ethnicities. 2.1% identified as Black or Black Irish, 2.2% as Asian or Asian Irish, and 1.7% as Other ethnicities. 5.0% of the population did not state their ethnicity.

== Economy ==
Industrial parks are located in Portlaoise, Portarlington and Mountmellick. The county receives EU funding as it is part of the cluster of three regions (Border, Midland and West), colloquially known as "BMW", that qualifies for special funding aid.

Agricultural activities occupy approximately 70% of the land area of the county (1,200 km^{2} or 460 sq mi). However agriculture's share of income in the "BMW" region has declined sharply in the past decade, and represented only approximately 3.9% of annual income (GVA) in 2005 Central Statistics Office. The remaining area includes considerable stretches of raised bog and the Slieve Bloom mountains, which are partially covered by coniferous forest.

== Culture ==
=== Performing arts ===
The county's largest theatre is the Dunamaise Theatre in Portlaoise which opened in 1999. There are many festivals held in Laois each year including:

- Durrow Die-Cast Model and Toy Show
- Halloween Howls
- Laois Bealtaine Festival
- Half Door Club Music & Set Dance Festival
- Rose of Tralee Regional Finals
- Laois Fleadh
- Heartlands Rally
- Gordon Bennett Classic Car Run
- Laois Walks Festival
- Festival Francais Portarlington
- Durrow Scarecrow Festival
- Stradbally National Steam Rally
- National Ploughing Championships
- Electric Picnic
- Maureen Culleton Festival of Dance
- B.A.R.E in the Woods
- Fisherstown Trad Festival
- Ossory Agricultural Show
- William Edmundson & Friends Gathering
- Mountmellick Drama Festival
- Laois International Golf Challenge

== Media ==
=== Newspapers ===
- The Laois Voice
- Laois Nationalist

== Railways ==
Iarnród Éireann train services along the Dublin-Cork line connects the county between Heuston station and Cork, Limerick, travel through the county, with railway stations at Portarlington, Portlaoise and Ballybrophy. From Portarlington trains run on the Dublin-Galway/Westport/Ballina line to Athlone as well as Galway, Westport and Ballina. From Ballybrophy trains run on the Ballybrophy line to Nenagh and Limerick direct.

Past Railways

There used to be railway stations at Mountmellick and Abbeyleix which now the station houses have become residences.

Both stations stopped in the 60s.

The line was from Kilkenny city to Abbeyleix to Portlaoise and then on to Mountmellick.It was originally planned that the line would go on to connect Mountmellick to Geashill and with possibility for another line from Geashill to Mullingar but these were never built leaving Mountmellick as a dead end.Mountmellick being a dead end lead to its closure the Portlaoise to Abbeyleix to Kilkenny city line closed as it was not as popular as the Carlow to Kilkenny line.

== Road transport ==
The M7 road runs through County Laois. This is one of the busiest roadways in Ireland connecting Dublin and Limerick and acts as part of the route for the M8 which connects Cork to Dublin. The M8 joins the M7 to the south of Portlaoise. Road infrastructure has improved greatly in the county over the past decade. Most major interurban routes through Laois have now been upgraded to motorway standards. All major traffic bottlenecks in Laois such as Abbeyleix and Mountrath have been bypassed following the opening of the M7/M8 tolled motorway project in May 2010. Both towns were major intercity bottlenecks for motorists, especially Abbeyleix where delays of up to 30 minutes or more were common.

Bus Éireann provides regular intercity bus services in the county. The Dublin to Limerick service runs every hour through towns and villages on the old N7 road (now R445) while the Dublin to Cork intercity bus service runs every two hours through towns in the county.

== People ==
- John George Adair (1823–1885), builder of Glenveagh Castle and financier of JA Ranch in the Texas Panhandle.
- Darina Allen (1953– ), TV chef.
- John Barrett (1753–1821), Vice Provost, Trinity College, 1807–1821.
- Sir Jonah Barrington (1760–1834).
- Elizabeth Barton of the Barton Family, Straffan and Lisduff
- Claire Byrne (1976– ), TV presenter/newscaster.
- Tony Byrne, former professional footballer who played for Ireland.
- Ned Campion (1937- ), Equestrian competitor for Ireland in 1968 Summer Olympics
- Des Connolly, footballer
- William Cosby, governor of New York from 1732 to 1736.
- Evelyn Cusack, Met Éireann meteorologist
- William Dargan (1799–1867), responsible for the Industrial Exhibition, 1853.
- Cecil Day-Lewis (1904–1972), British Poet-Laureate, 1967–1972.
- Daniel Delany (1747–1814), Bishop of Kildare and Leighlin.
- Eileen Dunne (1958– ), TV newscaster.
- Denis Dynon, recipient of the Victoria Cross
- Oliver J. Flanagan (1920–1987), Minister for Defence, 1976–1977.
- Charles Flanagan
- Seán Fleming
- Stephen Hunt (1981–), professional footballer playing for Wolverhampton Wanderers and Ireland.
- Liam Hyland, former politician.
- Anne Jellicoe, founder of Alexandra College.
- James Fintan Lalor (1807–1849), Young Irelander.
- Peter Lalor (1827–1889), leader of the Eureka Stockade miners revolt, Ballarat, Victoria, Australia.
- Patrick Lalor
- Charles McDonald
- James Macauley (1889–1945), former Ireland soccer international player.
- Bartholomew Mosse (1712–1759), founder, Rotunda Maternity Hospital, Dublin.
- David Murphy, Laois Gaelic footballer
- Valentine O'Hara (1875–1945), author and authority on Russia and the Baltic states.
- Kevin O'Higgins (1892–1927), TD and Minister for Justice.
- Sean O'Rourke, broadcaster and journalist with RTÉ.
- Bernard O'Shea, comedian, best known for his roles on RTÉ's Republic of Telly.
- Brian Rigney, former Ireland rugby international.
- Robin Roe (1928–2010), 19 times capped Irish rugby international who also played for the British and Irish Lions.
- Hon. William Russell Grace (1832–1904), mayor of New York, 1880–1885.
- John Shaw (1773–1823), U.S. Naval Officer.
- Robert Sheehan (1988– ), actor best known for playing Nathan Young on E4's comedy-drama, Misfits.
- Brian Stanley, politician.
- Kivas Tully (1820–1905), architect, Trinity College, Toronto, the Custom House and the Bank of Montreal.
- Zach Tuohy (1989–), professional Australian rules footballer, currently playing for Geelong Football Club.
- Colm Begley (1986–), Gaelic football player. He played Australian rules football for the Brisbane Lions in the AFL.
- Professor Noel Fitzpatrick (1967–), Veterinary Surgeon for Channel 4 television series The Supervet.
- Fionn mac Cumhaill, mythical hunter-warrior of Irish mythology
- Damien Bowe, singer and former member of Irish boyband D-Side.
- Anne Keenan-Buckley (1962–), a middle-distance runner who was on the Irish 1988 Summer Olympic team.
- John Whelan (Irish politician)

== Sport ==
Laois has a strong tradition of Gaelic games, with success at both Gaelic football and hurling. Laois are one of few counties to contest an All-Ireland final in both Gaelic football and hurling. In the 21st century, Laois have been more successful footballers than hurlers. Laois minors have had several successes over the past two decades, and the Laois senior footballers reached the Leinster final in 2003 (victorious), 2004, and 2005. As of 2022, Laois hurlers compete in the Liam MacCarthy Cup, a competition reserved for the premiere hurling counties while the footballers compete in the Sam Maguire Cup. Laois play home games at O'Moore Park, the county's largest sporting venue, which is often used for hurling championship games.

In rugby, Portlaoise RFC and Portarlington RFC compete in Division 2A of the Leinster League.

== Twin towns ==
County Laois is a participant in the Twin Towns program and has a relationship with the following municipalities:

Arlington, Massachusetts, United States
Coulounieix-Chamiers, France (1996)
Franklin, Tennessee, United States (2008)

== See also ==
- Laois Feile
- List of abbeys and priories in the Republic of Ireland (County Laois)
- List of towns and villages in Ireland
- Lord Lieutenant of Queen's County
- High Sheriff of Queen's County
