= List of Laois county football team title winning teams =

== National Football League, 1926 ==
In 1926, Laois won the first ever National Football League title beating Dublin in the final played in New Ross by 2-1 to 1-0.

Chris Miller and Jack Delaney were called into the side when Paddy Lenihan and Bill Kealy who had played in earlier games had left for the USA.

Number	Name	Club
1	Bill Irwin	Ballyroan
2	Paddy Bates	
3	Jack Browne	Annanough
4	Matt Delaney	Annanough
5	Tom Cribben	Portarlington
6	Dick Miller (Captain)	Annanough
7	Joe Ward	Portarlington
8	Chris Miller	Annanough
9	Bill Whelan	Ballyroan
10	Jim Miller	Annanough
11	Paddy Whelan	Portarlington
12	Joe O'Shea	Portarlington
13	Jack Delaney	Stradbally
14	John Miller	Annanough
15	Tom Costello	Portarlington
16		
17		
18		
19		
20		

== Leinster Senior Football Championship, 1946 ==
In 1946, Laois won their fifth Leinster Senior Football Championship title, beating Kildare by 0-11 to 1-6 in the final played at Croke Park.

Number	Name	Club
1	Andy Whelan	Jamestown
2	John Lalor	Jamestown
3	Jim Sayers	Timahoe
4	Mick Delaney	Stradbally
5	Mick Jones	Ballyroan
6	Tommy Murphy	Graiguecullen
7	Benny Hunt	Portarlington
8	Mick Haughney	Graiguecullen
9	Matt Dunne	Annanough
10	Faun Hughes	Jamestown
11	Bill Delaney	Stradbally
12	Morgan Delaney	Stradbally
13	Mick Fanning	Ballyroan
14	Chris Delaney	Stradbally
15	Paddy Peacock	Ballyroan
16	Paddy Sixsmith	Crettyard GAA
17	Fran Nerney	Annanough
18		
19		
20		

- Laois GAA website article
- Irish Times Jim Sayers interview

== Leinster Under 21 Football Championship, 1964 ==
On 2 August 1964, Laois won the first ever Leinster U21 Football Championship title, with a 1-8 to 0-8 win over their midland rivals Offaly in the final.

Laois went on to play Kerry in the All-Ireland Under-21 Football Championship final but were beaten 1-10 to 1-3 at Croke Park on 13 September.

Number	Name	Club
1	Tom Miller	Timahoe
2	Teddy Fennelly	Portlaoise
3	Tony Maher	Portlaoise
4	John Conway	Arles
5	Gabriel Lawlor	Emo
6	Jim Leonard (c)	Stradbally
7	Syd Harkin	Portlaoise
8	Eamonn Mulhall	Ballyroan
9	Paddy Brennan	Crettyard
10	John Fennell	Portlaoise
11	Mick Fennell	Graiguecullen
12	Danny Brennan	Arles
13	Christy O'Connor	O'Dempseys
14	Pascal Delaney	Portlaoise
15	Brian Delaney	Portlaoise
16	Dick Miller	Timahoe
17	John Meehan	Ballyroan
18	Chris Miller	
19		
20		

== Leinster Minor Football Championship, 1966 ==
On 24 July 1966, Laois won their second Leinster Minor Football Championship title with a 1-10 to 0-7 win over Offaly in the final at Croke Park.

Laois went on to play Down in the All-Ireland Minor Football Championship semi-final but, after a 1-11 to 2-8 draw, Laois were beaten 3-8 to 2-4 in the replay in Navan on 28 August.

Number	Name	Club
1	Sean Delaney	Stradbally
2	Danny Luttrell	Courtwood
3	Tom Manley	Portarlington
4	Andy Fennell	Graiguecullen
5	Paddy Dunne	Courtwood
6	Seamus Doran	Portlaoise
7	Jim Mangan	Portarlington
8	Donal Hoare	Portlaoise
9	Seamus Fleming	St Josephs
10	PJ Payne	Mountmellick
11	Paddy Lawlor	Emo
12	Kevin O'Brien	St Josephs
13	Johnny Lawlor (c)	Emo
14	Leo Brennan	St Josephs
15	Matt Hyland	The Heath
16		
17		
18		
19		
20		

== Leinster Minor Football Championship, 1967 ==
On 30 July 1967, Laois won their third Leinster Minor Football Championship title with a 1-8 to 2-4 win over Dublin in the final in Newbridge.

Laois went on to play Cork in the All-Ireland Minor Football Championship final but were beaten by 5-14 to 2-3 at Croke Park on 24 September.

Number	Name	Club
1	Tony Burke	
2	Michael Murphy	
3	Pat Fingleton	
4	Jim Mangan (c)	Portarlington
5	John Kavanagh	Courtwood
6	C McEvoy	
7	C Murphy	Portarlington
8	Ivor Houlihan	Mountmellick
9	Seamus Fleming	St Josephs
10	Sylvester Furey	
11	Bobby Miller	Timahoe
12	Stevie Allen	Portarlington
13	Enda Condron	Ballylinan
14	Johnny Lawlor	Emo
15	Tommy Keane	
16	Tony O'Brien	St Josephs
17		
18		
19		
20		

== Leinster Under 21 Football Championship, 1969 ==
On 9 August 1969, Laois won their second Leinster U21 Football Championship title with a 2-7 to 2-6 win over Wicklow in the final.

Laois went on to play Roscommon in the All-Ireland Under-21 Football Championship semi-final but were beaten 2-13 to 0-9 in Roscommon on 23 August.

Number	Name	Club
1	Tony Burke	Killeshin
2	Danny Luttrell	Courtwood
3	Tom Manley	Portarlington
4	Eamonn Roycroft	Portarlington
5	Tom Clancy	Timahoe
6	Christy Murphy	Portarlington
7	Liam Delaney	Arles
8	Ivor Houlihan	Mountmellick
9	Bobby Miller	Timahoe
10	Stevie Allen	Portarlington
11	Seamus Fleming	St Josephs
12	Johnny Lawlor	Emo
13	John Clancy	Timahoe
14	Paddy Lawlor	Emo
15	Har Mulhare	Portlaoise
16	Leo Brennan	St Josephs
17		
18		
19		
20		

== Leinster Under 21 Football Championship, 1982 ==
In 1982, Laois won their third Leinster U21 Football Championship title beating Longford by 2-11 to 0-3 in the final played in Tullamore on 18 July.

Number	Name	Club
1	Martin Conroy	Ballyroan
2	Noel Campion	St Josephs
3	Pat Roe	The Heath
4	Micky Drennan (c)	Ballyroan
5	Eddie Kelly	O'Dempseys
6	Mark Kavanagh	Portlaoise
7	Frankie Whelehan	O'Dempseys
8	Tommy Murphy	Portarlington
9	Mick Dempsey	St Josephs
10	Liam Irwin	Ballyroan
11	Jimmy Lewis	Portlaoise
12	John Ramsbottom	Timahoe
13	Pascal Doran	Graiguecullen
14	Declan Horan	Ballyroan
15	Christy Maguire	Graiguecullen
16	Sean Murphy	Ballyroan
17	Sean Booth	The Heath
18		
19		
20		

== National Football League, 1986 ==
In 1986, Laois won their second National Football League title beating Monaghan by 2-6 to 2-5 in the final played in Croke Park.

The men from the O'Moore County were the surprise team of the season coming from Division 3 to take the second highest honour in the game. Laois were the masters in the first thirty minutes leading at half-time by 2-4 to 1-1. Liam Irwin was majestic at midfield and scored four great points. John Costello was excellent his high fielding was Majestic. Pat Brophy and Colm Browne were excellent in defence. Eamon Whelan and Willie Brennan took their goals with style. Michael Caulfield was the scorer of Monaghan's goal.

Early in the second half Martin Conroy made a wonderful save from Michael Caulfield. In the 39th minute Monaghan reduced the deficit to 3 points when Ray McCarron scored from the penalty spot after Nudie Hughes was pulled down by Martin Conroy. The O'Moore County men's defence responded magnificently to the challenge restricting the defending champions attack to just four points in the second half.

Number	Name	Club
1	Martin Conroy	Ballyroan
2	Paddy Dunne	Ballyroan
3	Martin Dempsey	St Josephs
4	Eddie Kelly	O'Dempseys
5	Mick Aherne	O'Dempseys
6	Pat Brophy	Emo
7	Colm Browne (c)	Portlaoise
8	John Costello	O'Dempseys
9	Liam Irwin	Ballyroan
10	Gerry Browne	Portlaoise
11	Willie Brennan	Graiguecullen
12	Tom Prendergast	Portlaoise
13	Mick Dempsey	St Josephs
14	Eamon Whelan	Portlaoise
15	Christy Maguire	Graiguecullen
16	Noel Prendergast	Portlaoise
17	Ger Lawlor	Emo
18	Brian Nerney	O'Dempseys
19	John Ramsbottom	Timahoe
20		

== Leinster Minor Football Championship, 1998 ==
On 2 August 1998, Laois won their sixth Leinster Minor Football Championship title with a 2-9 to 0-12 win over Dublin in the final at Croke Park.

Laois went on to play Tyrone in the All-Ireland Minor Football Championship final but were beaten at Croke Park in September.

Number	Name	Club
1	Willie Moran	Arles/Killeen
2	Robert Jones	Kilcotton
3	Brian Gaynor	Portlaoise
4	Colm Clear	Portlaoise
5	Aidan Fennelly	Portlaoise
6	Paudge Leonard	Ballylinan
7	Brian McCormack	Portlaoise
8	Johnny Behan (c)	O'Dempseys
9	Brian Fitzpatrick	Portlaoise
10	Kieran Kelly	Ballylinan
11	Jamie Moran	Graiguecullen
12	Mick Clancy	The Heath
13	Pauric Clancy	Timahoe
14	Brian McDonald	Arles/Killeen
15	Benny O'Connell	Timahoe
16		
17		
18		
19		
20		

Subs: John Graham, Colm Byrne, Pauric Phelan, Eoin Browne, Damien Walsh, Donal Miller, Mark Dunne, John Ml. McDonald, John O'Neill.

== Leinster Senior Football Championship, 2003 ==
In 2003, Laois won their sixth Leinster Senior Football Championship title beating Kildare by 2-13 to 1-13 in the final played in front of 64,800 fans at Croke Park.

Number	Name	Club
1	Fergal Byron	Courtwood
2	Aidan Fennelly	Portlaoise
3	Colm Byrne	Portlaoise
4	Joe Higgins	St Josephs
5	Darren Rooney	Clonaslee-St.Manmans
6	Tom Kelly	St Josephs
7	Kevin Fitzpatrick	Portlaoise
8	Pauric Clancy	Timahoe
9	Noel Garvan	St Josephs
10	Ross Munnelly	Arles/Kilcruise
11	Mick Lawlor	Emo
12	Gary Kavanagh	Stradbally
13	Brian McDonald	Arles/Killeen
14	Ian Fitzgerald (c)	Portlaoise
15	Damien Delaney	Stradbally
16	Barry Brennan	Graiguecullen
17	Donal Miller	Annanough
18	Stephen Kelly	St Josephs
19	Hugh Emerson	Portarlington
20		
