= Laois Ladies' Senior Football Club Championship =

Laois Ladies' Football Championship
- Code: Ladies' Football
- Founded: 1976
- Trophy: Lulu Carroll trophy
- Title holders: St Conleths (3rd title)
- Most titles: Timahoe (12 titles)

The Laois Ladies' Senior Football Club Championship has been running since 1976 - 46 finals. The competition has seen seven clubs winning the title, with St Conleths winning the latest in 2026. The final has been played in a number of grounds around the county, often in O'Moore Park (32 times including replays). The cup is named after Lulu Carroll who was one of Laois' greatest ever ladies' footballers. The winners progress on into the provincial championship and Laois has a good record for a small county, having won the Leinster championship on 14 occasions. All-Ireland glory has proven more elusive, however, with The Heath securing Laois' only two titles, in 1985 & 1986.

== Key ==
All-Ireland winners	twice
All-Ireland finalists	three times
Leinster winners	eight times
Leinster finalists	13 times

== By Year ==
Year	Venue	Winner	Tot	Runner-up	Tot	Marg
2026	O'Moore Park	St Conleths 4-8	20	St Josephs 1-5	8	12
2025	Stradbally	Portlaoise 3-11	20	St Conleths 1-11	14	6
2024	O'Moore Park	St Conleths 0-12	12	Portlaoise 1-08	11	1
2023	Stradbally	Portlaoise 1-06	9	St Conleths 0-07	7	2
2022	O'Moore Park	Portlaoise 0-12	12	St Conleths 2-05	11	1
2021	O'Moore Park	St Conleths 0-11	11	Sarsfields 0-08	8	3
2020	O'Moore Park	Portlaoise 1-12	12	Sarsfields 0-12	12	3
2019	Crettyard	Sarsfields 4-13	25	Timahoe 1-10	13	12
2018	O'Moore Park	Sarsfields 0-11	11	Portlaoise 0-07	7	4
2017	Vicarstown	Sarsfields 3-15	24	Portlaoise 0-03	3	21
2016	Portarlington	Sarsfields 2-11	17	Portlaoise 0-12	12	5
2015	Crettyard [aet]	Sarsfields 4-10	22	Timahoe 1-11	14	8
2015	O'Moore Park	Sarsfields 2-10	16	Timahoe 2-10	16	0
2014	O'Moore Park	Sarsfields 4-15	27	Timahoe 0-09	9	18
2013	Ratheniska	Sarsfields 3-07	16	Timahoe 0-12	12	4
2012	Crettyard	Timahoe 2-09	15	Sarsfields 2-08	14	1
2011	O'Moore Park	Sarsfields 2-08	14	Timahoe 0-09	9	5
2010	O'Moore Park	Timahoe 2-10	16	Sarsfields 0-14	14	2
2009	O'Moore Park	Timahoe 2-11	17	Sarsfields 2-08	14	3
2008	O'Moore Park	Sarsfields 1-10	13	Timahoe 0-06	6	7
2007	O'Moore Park	Timahoe 1-07	10	Sarsfields 1-06	9	1
2006	O'Moore Park	Shanahoe 2-09	15	Sarsfields 1-09	12	3
2006	Ratheniska	Shanahoe 0-10	10	Sarsfields 1-07	10	0
2005	Ballylinan	Timahoe 1-09	12	Crettyard 0-11	11	1
2004	O'Moore Park	Crettyard 2-09	15	Shanahoe 1-09	12	3
2003	O'Moore Park	Timahoe 0-16	16	Sarsfields 0-09	9	7
2002	Ballylinan	Crettyard 2-10	16	Timahoe 1-07	10	6
2001	O'Moore Park	Timahoe 4-12	24	Crettyard 5-04	19	5
2000	O'Moore Park	Timahoe 3-08	17	Crettyard 0-07	7	10
2000	O'Moore Park	Timahoe 3-08	17	Crettyard 3-08	17	0
1999	O'Moore Park	Timahoe 1-12	15	Crettyard 1-05	8	7
1998	Stradbally	Timahoe 2-14	20	Crettyard 1-04	7	13
1997	O'Moore Park	Crettyard 2-11	17	Timahoe 1-11	14	3
1996	O'Moore Park	Timahoe 1-11	14	Crettyard 0-09	9	5
1995	Ballylinan	Crettyard 1-08	11	Timahoe 1-06	9	2
1994	O'Moore Park	Crettyard 2-12	18	Timahoe 0-06	6	12
1993	O'Moore Park	Crettyard 1-06	9	Timahoe 0-04	4	5
1992	O'Moore Park	Timahoe 1-09	12	Crettyard 2-05	11	1
1991	O'Moore Park	Crettyard 1-08	11	Timahoe 1-06	9	2
1991	O'Moore Park	Crettyard 1-07	10	Timahoe 1-07	10	0
1990	O'Moore Park	Crettyard 3-05	14	Timahoe 2-04	10	4
1989	O'Moore Park	The Heath 1-07	10	Crettyard 1-04	7	3
1989	O'Moore Park	The Heath 1-05	8	Crettyard 1-05	8	0
1988	Timahoe	The Heath 1-06	9	Crettyard 0-07	7	2
1987	Timahoe	Crettyard 2-05	11	The Heath 1-05	8	3
1986	O'Moore Park	The Heath 2-16	22	Crettyard 0-05	5	17
1985	Timahoe	The Heath 3-07	16	Crettyard 0-03	3	13
1984	Timahoe	The Heath 2-05	11	Crettyard 0-02	2	9
1983	Timahoe	The Heath 0-09	9	Crettyard 1-03	6	3
1982	Timahoe	The Heath 3-08	17	Crettyard 2-04	10	7
1981	Ballylinan	The Heath 5-03	18	Crettyard 1-01	4	14
1980	O'Moore Park	The Heath 3-06	15	Crettyard 3-04	13	2
1979	Timahoe	Crettyard 3-02	11	The Heath 3-00	9	2
1978	O'Moore Park	Crettyard 1-02	5	Ballyroan 0-04	4	1
1977	O'Moore Park	The Heath 4-05	17	Crettyard 2-04	10	7
1976	O'Moore Park	The Heath 0-11	11	Ballyroan 1-01	4	7

== By Club ==
Club	Winner	First	Last	Finalist	First	Last
Timahoe	12	1992	2012	13	1990	2019
The Heath	11	1976	1989	2	1979	1987
Crettyard	11	1978	2004	17	1977	2005
Sarsfields	9	2008	2019	8	2003	2021
Portlaoise	3	2020	2023	3	2016	2018
Shanahoe	1	2006		1	2004	
St Conleths	2	2021	2024	2	2022	2023
Ballyroan	0	-		2	1976	1978

== Back-to-back wins ==
No.	Team (Years)
7	The Heath (1980–86)
7	Sarsfields (2013–19)
4	Timahoe (1998-01)
3	Crettyard (1993–95)
2	The Heath (1976–77)
2	Crettyard (1978–79)
2	The Heath (1988–89)
2	Crettyard (1990–91)
2	Timahoe (2009–10)

== Head-to-Head Matrix ==
Winner\Loser	Ball	Cret	Port	Sars	Shan	StCo	Heat	Tima	WINS
Ballyroan	-	0	0	0	0	0	0	0	0
Crettyard	1	-	0	0	1	0	2	7	11
Portlaoise	0	0	-	1	0	1	0	0	2
Sarsfields	0	0	3	-	0	0	0	6	9
Shanahoe	0	0	0	1	-	0	0	0	1
St Conleths	0	0	0	1	0	-	0	0	1
The Heath	1	10	0	0	0	0	-	0	11
Timahoe	0	7	0	5	0	0	0	-	12
LOSSES	2	17	3	8	1	1	2	13	46

== Consecutive Appearances ==
Apps	Team (Years)
26	Crettyard (1977-02)
16	Sarsfields (2006–21)
14	Timahoe (1990-03)
11	The Heath (1979–89)
9	Timahoe (2007–15)
3	Portlaoise (2016–18)
2	The Heath (1976–77)
2	Crettyard (2004–05)
2	St Conleths (2021–22)

== Top10 All-Time Scorers (Finals) ==
Pos	Player	Score	Finals scored	Years
1	Tracey Lawlor ( Sarsfields)	4-65 (77pts)	13 games	2006-2018
2	Sue Ramsbottom ( Timahoe)	5-56 (71pts)	17 games	1991-2007
3	Martina Dunne ( Timahoe)	1-47 (50pts)	11 games	2005-2015
4	Linda Brennan ( Crettyard)	3-39 (48pts)	13 games	1990-2002
5	Mary Keogh ( Crettyard)	5-25 (40pts)	11 games	1990-2004
6	Claire Conlon ( Sarsfields)	1-30 (33pts)	12 games	2003-2021
=7	Aileen O'Loughlin ( Sarsfields)	5-17 (32pts)	8 games	2003-2019
=7	Laura Marie Maher ( Sarsfields)	8-8 (32pts)	8 games	2011-2020
8	Mo Nerney ( Timahoe)	4-18 (30pts)	7 games	2010-2019
9	Lulu Carroll ( Timahoe)	3-19 (28pts)	11 games	1991-2002
10	Claire Conlon ( Sarsfields)	1-25 (28pts)	11 games	2003-2020

== Top10 Single-Game Scorers (Finals) ==
Pos	Player	Score	Year/Opponent
1	Tracey Lawlor ( Sarsfields)	2-7 (13pts)	2014 vs Timahoe
=2	Sue Ramsbottom ( Timahoe)	2-6 (12pts)	2001 vs Crettyard
=2	Theresa Swayne ( Crettyard)	4-0 (12pts)	2001 vs Timahoe
=4	Mary Conroy ( The Heath)	3-1 (10pts)	1981 vs Crettyard
=4	Tracey Lawlor ( Sarsfields)	1-7 (10pts)	2016 vs Portlaoise
=4	Mo Nerney ( Timahoe)	1-7 (10pts)	2019 vs Sarsfields
=7	Linda Brennan ( Crettyard)	2-3 (9pts)	1992 vs Timahoe
=7	Tracey Lawlor ( Sarsfields)	0-9 (9pts)	2010 vs Timahoe
9	Eight players equal on 8 points		

- missing scorers: Ballyroan 1-1 (1976), Crettyard 2-4 (1982), Crettyard 0-5 (1995), Timahoe 0-3 (1995), Crettyard 0-2 (2005), Timahoe 0-1 (2007), Sarsfields 0-1 (2007) & Timahoe 0-1 (2015)
- name in italics: the player was on the losing team that year.

== Statistics & Notable Scores ==
- SCORERS
  - 77 - The overall finals' top scorer is Tracey Lawlor (Sarsfields) who has a total of 4-65 (77pts), scored in 13 finals.
  - 13 - The top scorer for a single game is Tracey Lawlor (Sarsfields) who hit 2-7 (13pts) in 2014 vs Timahoe.
  - 12 -The previous record for a single game was set in 2001, and was, amazingly, a joint record where Sue Ramsbottom scored 2-6 and Theresa Swayne scored 4-0 in the same game!
- APPEARANCES
  - 28 - Crettyard have appeared in a record 28 finals - including a record 26-in-a-row between 1977 & 2002.
  - The competition has thrown up many repeated finals where two teams go head-to-head for a number of years in a row. These are:
    - Crettyard v The Heath (11 years/12 matches) 1979-1989
    - Crettyard v Timahoe (13 years/15 matches) 1990-2002
    - Timahoe v Sarsfields (9 years/10 matches) 2007-2015
    - Sarsfields v Portlaoise (3 years/3 matches) 2016-2018
  - The most common match-ups have been Crettyard v Timahoe (15 finals), The Heath v Crettyard (12 finals) and Timahoe v Sarsfields (11 finals).
  - The Heath, in the first final, and St Conleths (2021) are the only teams to have won on their first appearance. The Heath beat Ballyroan in 1976, while St Conleths beat Sarsfields in 2021. All the other teams - Crettyard (1977), Timahoe (1990), Sarsfields (2003), Shanahoe (2004) and Portlaoise (2016) - have lost on their first attempt.
  - Sarsfields & Portlaoise are the only sides to lose three finals before winning one. Ballyroan & Timahoe lost two, while Crettyard & Shanhoe both lost one.
- TEAM SCORING
  - 21 - Sarsfields' 21pt winning margin in 2017 set a new record, beating their old record from 2014, which in turn had bridged a 28 year old gap in beating The Heath's 1986 record of 17pts.
  - 27 - Sarsfields' 4-15 (27pts) total in 2014 set a new scoring record for the final, beating the previous record of 4-12 (24pts) set in 2001 by Timahoe.
  - 19 - Crettyard's losing score of 5-4 in 2001 would have won all bar the 1986, 1998, 2014 finals and the 2015 replay.
  - 2 - Crettyard also posted the lowest score of any team in the final: 0-2 in 1984.
  - 5 - The lowest winning score is 5pts - 1978 by Crettyard.
- FINALS SCORING
  - 43 - The highest scoring final was the 2001 final between Timahoe and Crettyard. Timahoe won 4-12 5-4, a total of 43 points.
  - 9 - The lowest scoring final was in 1978 when only 9 points were scored between the two teams.
  - 2 - Only two finals have finished goal-less: 2003 & 2018.
- DRAWS
  - 5 - There have been five draws: 1989, 1991, 2000, 2006 & 2015.
  - 17 - 2000 had the highest-scoring draw (17 points each).
  - 8 - 1989 had the lowest-scoring drawn game (8 points each).
  - 10 -Timahoe's win over Crettyard in the 2001 replay was the biggest winning margin in a replay (10 points).
  - 22 - Sarsfield's 4-10 in 2015 is the highest score in a replay.
  - 36 - 2015 also had the highest-scoring replay (36 points).
- VENUES
  - 5 - Sarsfields have won finals in five different venues - their first wins in each venue were: 2008 O'Moore Park, 2013 Ratheniska, 2015 Crettyard, 2016 Portarlington & 2017 Annanough.
- HEAD TO HEAD
  - Crettyard are the only team to beat four opponents in finals, while Sarsfields are the only side to lose to four different opponents.
