= Robert Emmets GAA =

Gaelic Athletic Association club in Dublin, Ireland

Robert Emmets GAC
- CLG Roibéard Eiméad
- Founded: 1969
- County: Dublin
- Nickname: Emmets
- Colours: Green, white and gold
- Grounds: "Eight acres", Greentrees Park, Perrystown, Dublin 12
- Coordinates: 53°18′38.63″N 6°19′21.49″W

Playing kits
Standard colours

Senior Club Championships
	All Ireland	Leinster champions	Dublin champions
Ladies' football:	–	–	2

Robert Emmets GAC (Irish: CLG Roibéard Eiméad ) are a Gaelic Athletic Association club located in Perrystown, Dublin, Ireland.

== Competitions ==
Their adult men's football teams play Adult Junior football in AFL 8 and the Dublin Junior 1 Football Championship

== Roll of Honour ==
- Dublin AFL Division 10S Winner 2024
- Dublin AFL Division 11S Winner 2010, 2023
- Dublin Ladies' Senior Football Championship Winners 1991, 1994

== History ==
Robert Emmets GAC was founded by Michael Clancy (County Clare) and Billy Quinn (County Tipperary), amongst others, in Perrystown.
