= Dublin Ladies' Senior Football Championship =

Ladies' Gaelic football competition

Dublin Senior Ladies' Football Championship
- Code: Ladies' Gaelic football
- Founded: 1985
- Region: Dublin (GAA)
- Trophy: Michael Murphy Perpetual Cup
- Title holders: Kilmacud Crokes (4th title)
- Most titles: Ballyboden St. Enda's (10 titles)
- Sponsors: New Ireland Assurance; Tesco

The Dublin Ladies' Senior Football Championship is the senior Ladies' Gaelic football competition featuring clubs affiliated to the Dublin GAA. Ballyboden St. Enda's are the competitions most successful club, having won 10 titles. Between 2000 and 2008 they completed a nine-in-a-row. They won their tenth title in 2010. In more recent seasons, the most successful club has been Foxrock–Cabinteely. Between 2015 and 2021 they completed a seven-in-a-row. The winners of the Dublin Senior Ladies' Football Championship are awarded the Michael Murphy Perpetual Cup. They also qualify to play in the Leinster Ladies' Senior Club Football Championship and if they win that, they qualify for the All-Ireland Ladies' Club Football Championship.

Kilmacud Crokes are the reigning champions, having defeated St Sylvester's in the 2025 final.

== Finals ==
The winners of the Dublin Senior Ladies' Football Championship qualify to play in the Leinster Ladies' Senior Club Football Championship and if they win that, they qualify for the All-Ireland Ladies' Club Football Championship. Ballyboden St. Enda's, Portobello, Na Fianna, Kilmacud Crokes and Foxrock–Cabinteely have all won Leinster titles. Ballyboden St. Enda's have also won two All-Irelands. Between 2015 and 2019 Foxrock–Cabinteely completed a five-in-a-row of Dublin and Leinster doubles.

Leinster and All-Ireland winners
Leinster winners and All-Ireland finalists
Leinster winners

Season	Winner	Score	Runners up	Venue
2025	Kilmacud Crokes	1–11 : 0–12	St Sylvester's	Parnell Park
2024	Kilmacud Crokes	1–07 : 1–06	St Sylvester's	Parnell Park
2023	Kilmacud Crokes	2–12 : 3–04	Na Fianna	Parnell Park
2022	Kilmacud Crokes	2–09 : 0–12	Thomas Davis	Parnell Park
2021	Foxrock–Cabinteely	1–07 : 0–07	Na Fianna	Lawless Memorial Park
2020	Foxrock–Cabinteely	3–07 : 2–08	Kilmacud Crokes	Parnell Park
2019	Foxrock–Cabinteely	2–13 : 3–08	Kilmacud Crokes	Parnell Park (Note: After extra time.)
2018	Foxrock–Cabinteely	1–13 : 0–07	St Brigid's	St Margaret's
2017	Foxrock–Cabinteely	1–10 : 1–05	Ballyboden St. Enda's	Swords
2016	Foxrock–Cabinteely	1–13 : 2–09	St Brigid's	Parnell Park
2015	Foxrock–Cabinteely	3–10 : 2–01	St Brigid's	Parnell Park
2014	Na Fianna	1–11 : 1–09	Foxrock–Cabinteely	Swords
2013	Fingallians	2–16 : 4–06	Na Fianna	(Note: After replay.)
2012	Foxrock–Cabinteely	0–12 : 0–09	Na Fianna	Parnell Park
2011	Na Fianna	4–12 : 2–08	Ballyboden St. Enda's	Parnell Park
2010	Ballyboden St. Enda's	3–13 : 1–05	Fingallians	Parnell Park
2009	Na Fianna	1–11 : 1–10	Naomh Mearnóg	Parnell Park
2008	Ballyboden St. Enda's	3–15 : 0–11	Na Fianna	Parnell Park
2007	Ballyboden St. Enda's	1–12 : 1–10	Naomh Mearnóg/St. Sylvester's	Parnell Park
2006	Ballyboden St. Enda's	2–14 : 1–06	Garda	Parnell Park
2005	Ballyboden St. Enda's	1–11 : 2–03	Na Fianna	Parnell Park
2004	Ballyboden St. Enda's	2–15 : 1–07	Naomh Mearnóg	Parnell Park
2003	Ballyboden St. Enda's	1–12 : 1–09	Garda	
2002	Ballyboden St. Enda's	1–14 : 1–11	Garda	
2001	Ballyboden St. Enda's	2–15 : 0–05	Garda	
2000	Ballyboden St. Enda's	2–09 : 0–07	Na Fianna	
1999	Portobello	3–09 : 3–06	Ballyboden St. Enda's	
1998	Portobello	3–09 : 1–08	St Olaf's	
1997	Portobello	1–12 : 1–02	St Brigid's	
1996	Portobello	1–09 : 0–09	St Olaf's	(Note: After replay.)
1995	Portobello		St Olaf's	O'Toole Park
1994	Robert Emmets	2–05 : 1–07	Portobello	
1993	Marino	2–20 : 1–11	Portobello	
1992	Portobello		Marino	Parnell Park
1991	Robert Emmets	2–08 : 1–01	Park Rangers	
1990	Marino	2–03 : 0–04	Robert Emmets	
1989	St. Monica's	2–04 : 1–05	Robert Emmets	Páirc Uí Mhurchú
1988	Marino	4–05 : 2–04	Robert Emmets	
1987	Marino	(Note: Marino won after replay.)	Robert Emmets	
1986	UCD			
1985	Rathcoole (Rathcoole)		UCD	O'Toole Park

== Winners by club ==
Ballyboden St. Enda's are the competitions most successful club, having won 10 titles. Between 2000 and 2008 they completed a nine-in-a-row. Naomh Mearnóg ended their monopoly of championships when they defeated them in the 2009 semi-final. They won their tenth title in 2010. Portobello were the dominant club during the 1990s. After winning their first title in 1992, they completed a five-in-a-row between 1995 and 1999. In more recent seasons, the most successful club has been Foxrock–Cabinteely between 2015 and 2021 they completed a seven-in-a-row.

#	Club	Titles	Years won
1	Ballyboden St. Enda's	10	2000, 2001, 2002, 2003, 2004, 2005, 2006, 2007, 2008, 2010
2	Foxrock–Cabinteely	8	2012, 2015, 2016, 2017, 2018, 2019, 2020, 2021
3	Portobello	6	1992, 1995, 1996, 1997, 1998, 1999
4	Marino	4	1987, 1988, 1990, 1993
4	Kilmacud Crokes	4	2022, 2023, 2024, 2025
5	Na Fianna	3	2009, 2011, 2014
7	Robert Emmets	2	1991, 1994
8	Fingallians	1	2013
8	Rathcoole (Rathcoole)	1	1985
8	St. Monica's	1	1989
8	UCD	1	1986

== Trophy ==
The winners of the Dublin Senior Ladies' Football Championship are awarded the Michael Murphy Perpetual Cup. The trophy was donated by the Murphy family to honour and remember their son and brother, a pilot who was Dublin GAA enthusiast.
