= Bobby Miller (Gaelic footballer) =

Irish Gaelic footballer (1950–2006)

Personal information
- Born: 18 March 1950 County Laois, Ireland
- Died: 10 June 2006 (aged 56)

Sport
- Sport: Gaelic football
- Position: -
Club
- Years: Club
- ? -?: Timahoe
Inter-county
- Years: County
- ?- ?: Laois

Bobby Miller (18 March 1950 – 10 June 2006) was an Irish Gaelic footballer who played for Laois and Timahoe. In June 2006, Miller was managing the Arles-Killeen side from Laois that included Laois county stars Beano McDonald and Donal Brennan when he became ill on the sideline shortly before half time. Medics did what they could on the pitch itself and he was then taken to Portlaoise Midland Regional Hospital but was pronounced dead on arrival. He was 56 years of age.

== Player ==
He won the Leinster Minor Football Championship title with Laois in 1967 and in 1969 he added a Leinster U21 Football Championship title to his honours.

During the same year, 1969, he won a Laois Senior Football Championship with his Timahoe GAA club and it proved to be the only time Timahoe were crowned club champions in Laois at senior level. Bobby along with four of his brothers John, Tom, Jim and Richard (the current Chairman of Laois County Board) contributed in a major way to that famous win. The 1969 team was captained by Tom Joe Bradley.

Miller famously won the Railway Cup with Leinster in 1974 while partnering Kildare's Pat Mangan in midfield.

== Manager ==
As a manager, Miller trained Athy to win their first Kildare senior football title in 45 years in 1987 and in the following years he managed Leinster to win back-to-back Railway Cup titles.

He will perhaps be most renowned for his success as a manager when he guided Carlow's Éire Óg to their first of five Leinster club title victories in 1993 which also included two All-Ireland Senior Club Football Championship final appearances.

Miller also had a managerial period with his native Laois.

Preceded by Kieran Brennan	Laois Senior Football Manager; 1988-89	Succeeded by Richie Connor
