= Barry Brennan =

Barry Brennan may refer to:

- Barry Brennan (Galway footballer) (born 1958), Irish Gaelic footballer, 1981 All Star winner
- Barry Brennan (Laois footballer), Irish Gaelic footballer, 2003 Leinster winner
- Barry Brennan (rugby league), Fortitude Valley Diehards player
