= 1984 All-Ireland Senior Ladies' Football Championship final =

1984 All-Ireland Senior Ladies' Football Final
- Event: 1984 All-Ireland Senior Ladies' Football Championship
| Kerry | Leitrim |
| 0–5 | 0–3 |
- Date: 9 September 1984
- Venue: Páirc Mochua, Timahoe

The 1984 All-Ireland Senior Ladies' Football Championship final was the eleventh All-Ireland Final and the deciding match of the 1984 All-Ireland Senior Ladies' Football Championship, an inter-county ladies' Gaelic football tournament for the top teams in Ireland.

Kerry claimed their third title in a row, winning the only goalless final.
