= Eoin Culliton =

Irish Gaelic footballer

Personal information
- Born: Timahoe, County Laois
- Height: 6 ft 0 in (183 cm)

Sport
- Sport: Gaelic Football
- Position: Goalkeeper
Club
- Years: Club
- Timahoe
Inter-county
- Years: County
- 2011-: Laois

Eoin Culliton is a Gaelic footballer for Laois.

He plays club football for his local club Timahoe and plays as goalkeeper for the Laois senior inter-county team.
