= Leinster Ladies' Senior Club Football Championship =

Gaelic football association in Ireland

- Code: Ladies' Gaelic football
- Founded: 1978
- Trophy: Bill Daly trophy
- Title holders: Kilmacud Crokes (4th title)
- Most titles: Rochfortbridge (Westmeath) (7 titles)

The Leinster Ladies' senior football club championship is a Gaelic football tournament in Ireland that has been running since 1978. The trophy is named after the man who presented it, Bill Daly from County Cavan, who lived in Dublin and was involved with the Ballyboden St Endas team. Kilmacud Crokes are the current holders having secured their fourth title in November 2025, and will represent Leinster in the All Ireland series.

Foxrock-Cabinteely are the only club to win six consecutive Leinster senior titles.

Dublin are the most successful county, their clubs having won the championship on 18 occasions. In total, six of the 12 Leinster counties have won the cup at least once – Laois, Dublin, Westmeath, Wexford, Offaly, and Meath.

== By year ==
Key

All-Ireland winners
All-Ireland finalists

Year	Venue	Winner	Score	Runner-up	Score
2025	O'Connor Park	Kilmacud Crokes (Dublin)	5-13	Tinahely (Wicklow)	1-08
2024	O'Connor Park	Kilmacud Crokes (Dublin)	4-14	Eadestown (Kildare)	0-03
2023	Coralstown/Kinnegad	Kilmacud Crokes (Dublin)	4-18	Naomh Ciarán (Offaly)	1-10
2022	Bray	Kilmacud Crokes (Dublin)	4-15	Tinahely (Wicklow)	0-08
2021	Kinnegad	Dunboyne (Meath)	2-11	Foxrock–Cabinteely (Dublin)	2-08
2020	Kinnegad	Foxrock–Cabinteely (Dublin)	1-12	Portlaoise (Laois)	2-04
2019	Kinnegad	Foxrock–Cabinteely (Dublin)	4-06	Sarsfields (Laois)	1-07
2018	Kinnegad	Foxrock–Cabinteely (Dublin)	4-11	Sarsfields (Laois)	1-08
2017	Kinnegad	Foxrock–Cabinteely (Dublin)	4-17	Confey (Kildare)	1-07
2016	Kinnegad	Foxrock–Cabinteely (Dublin)	5-10	St Laurence's (Kildare)	1-03
2015	Clane	Foxrock–Cabinteely (Dublin)	1-12	Sarsfields (Laois)	1-07
2014	Clane	Sarsfields (Laois)	1-09	Na Fianna (Dublin)	1-07
2013	Clane	Sarsfields (Laois)	5-07	Seneschalstown (Meath)	0-13
2012	Aughrim	Shelmaliers (Wexford)	3-02	Foxrock–Cabinteely (Dublin)	0-10
2011	St Conleth's Park	Na Fianna (Dublin)	3-03	Sarsfields (Laois)	0-10
2010	Clane	Timahoe (Laois)	1-11	Ballyboden St Endas (Dublin)	0-08
2009	Athy	Timahoe (Laois)	2-08	Seneschalstown (Meath)	0-12
2008	Graiguecullen	Sarsfields (Laois)	1-16	Clonee (Wexford)	2-03
2007	Athy	Ballyboden St Endas (Dublin)	2-13	Timahoe (Laois)	0-10
2006	Clane	Ballyboden St Endas (Dublin)	2-12	Seneschalstown (Meath)	1-14
2005	Athy	Ballyboden St Endas (Dublin)	2-13	Timahoe (Laois)	1-04
2004	O'Moore Park	Ballyboden St Endas (Dublin)	3-13	Clonee (Wexford)	2-08
2003	Portarlington	Seneschalstown (Meath)	1-12	Shelmaliers (Wexford)	2-04
2002	Bagenalstown	Ballyboden St Endas (Dublin)	3-10	Shelmaliers (Wexford)	0-05
2001	Clane	Ballyboden St Endas (Dublin)	2-11	Cooley Kickhams (Louth)	0-06
2000	St Mary's, Leixlip	Timahoe (Laois)	3-08	Seneschalstown (Meath)	2-08
1999	Bagenalstown	Shelmaliers (Wexford)	1-08	Timahoe (Laois)	0-09
1998	Bagenalstown	Portobello (Dublin)	1-10	Timahoe (Laois)	0-10
1997	Éire Óg, Carlow	Shelmaliers (Wexford)	2-10	Crettyard (Laois)	3-04
1996	Croke Park	Shelmaliers (Wexford)	4-09	Rochfortbridge (Westmeath)	1-13
1995	Tullow	Shelmaliers (Wexford)	3-05	An Tóchar (Wicklow)	1-09
1994	Crettyard	Rochfortbridge (Westmeath)	3-11	An Tóchar (Wicklow)	1-05
1993	Crettyard	Crettyard (Laois)	4-07	Shelmaliers (Wexford)	2-04
1992	Kinnegad	Rochfortbridge (Westmeath)	2-06	Shelmaliers (Wexford)	2-04
1991	O'Toole Park	Rochfortbridge (Westmeath)	1-13	Robert Emmets (Dublin)	2-07
1990	Adamstown	Rochfortbridge (Westmeath)	4-05	Adamstown (Wexford)	0-00
1989	Rochfortbridge	Rochfortbridge (Westmeath)	0-07	The Heath (Laois)	1-02
1989	The Heath	Rochfortbridge (Westmeath)	1-06	The Heath (Laois)	2-03
1988	Portlaoise	Adamstown (Wexford)	0-09	The Heath (Laois)	1-03
1987	Clongeen	Adamstown (Wexford)	8-04	Crettyard (Laois)	1-03
1986	Castletown Geoghegan	The Heath (Laois)	4-06	Rochfortbridge (Westmeath)	2-03
1985	Castlebridge	The Heath (Laois)	1-08	Shelmaliers (Wexford)	1-05
1984	Rochfortbridge	The Heath (Laois)	4-07	Rochfortbridge (Westmeath)	0-02
1983	The Heath	The Heath (Laois)	2-07	Rochfortbridge (Westmeath)	1-07
1982	Rochfortbridge	Rochfortbridge (Westmeath)	0-03	Tullamore (Offaly)	0-02
1981	Ballinamore, Offaly	Tullamore (Offaly)	2-06	Rochfortbridge (Westmeath)	0-05
1980	O'Moore Park	Rochfortbridge (Westmeath)	3-04	Adamstown (Wexford)	0-02
1979	Portarlington	Crettyard (Laois)	4-01	Rochfortbridge (Westmeath)	1-06
1978	Crettyard	Crettyard (Laois)	2-05	Rochfortbridge (Westmeath)	2-02
1977	-	Crettyard (Laois)	no opposition		

- The Bill Daly cup states that the 1979 winners were The Heath but evidence elsewhere points to this not being the case.

== By Club ==
Club	Winners	First	Last	Finalists	First	Last
Rochfortbridge (Westmeath)	7	1980	1994	7	1978	1996
Foxrock–Cabinteely (Dublin)	6	2015	2020	2	2012	2022
Ballyboden St Endas (Dublin)	6	2001	2007	1	2010	
Shelmaliers (Wexford)	5	1995	2012	5	1985	2003
The Heath (Laois)	4	1983	1986	2	1988	1989
Crettyard (Laois)	4	1978	1993	2	1987	1996
Kilmacud Crokes (Dublin)	4	2022	2025	0	-	
Timahoe (Laois)	3	2000	2010	4	1998	2007
Sarsfields (Laois)	3	2008	2014	4	2011	2019
Adamstown (Wexford)	2	1987	1988	2	1980	1990
Seneschalstown (Meath)	1	2003		4	2000	2013
Tullamore (Offaly)	1	1981		1	1982	
Na Fianna (Dublin)	1	2011		1	2014	
Portobello (Dublin)	1	1998		0	-	
Dunboyne (Meath)	1	2021		0	-	
An Tóchar (Wicklow)	0	-		2	1994	1995
Clonee (Wexford)	0	-		2	2004	2008
Tinahely (Wicklow)	0	-		2	2022	2024
Robert Emmets (Dublin)	0	-		1	1991	
Cooley Kickhams (Louth)	0	-		1	2001	
St Laurences (Kildare)	0	-		1	2016	
Confey (Kildare)	0	-		1	2017	
Portlaoise (Laois)	0	-		1	2020	
Naomh Ciarán (Offaly)	0	-		1	2023	
Eadestown (Kildare)	0	-		1	2024	

== By County ==
County	Winners	Clubs	First	Last	Finalists	Clubs	First	Last
Dublin	18	5	1998	2025	5	4	1991	2021
Laois	14	4	1977	2014	13	5	1987	2020
Wexford	7	2	1987	2012	9	3	1980	2008
Westmeath	7	1	1980	1994	7	1	1978	1996
Meath	2	2	2003	2022	4	1	2000	2013
Offaly	1	1	1981		2	2	1982	2023
Wicklow	0	0	-		4	2	1994	2025
Kildare	0	0	-		3	3	2016	2024
Louth	0	0	-		1	1	2001	
