= Sarsfields Mountmellick LFC =

Ladies Football Club based in Mountmellick, County Laois

- Na Sáirséalaigh Móinteach Milic
- Founded: 1995
- County: Laois
- Colours: Blue and amber
- Coordinates: 53°06′13.56″N 7°18′14.15″W

Playing kits
Standard colours

Senior Club Championships
	All Ireland	Leinster champions	Laois champions
Ladies' football:	–	3	9

Sarsfields LFC Laois is a Ladies' Gaelic Football Association club based in Mountmellick in County Laois. It fields teams in Ladies' football from juvenile up to adult.

At adult level, the club fields football teams at Senior and Junior grades. The club colours are blue and amber. Sarsfields uses the same crest as Mountmellick GAA.

== History ==
Sarsfields LFC was set up in 1995 for girls from the Mountmellick parish area (also for Rosenallis) who wished to play football.

The new club was called Sarsfields, a named derived from earlier teams in the Mountmellick area in the past.

In 2001 Sarsfields won both the Laois Junior Football Championship and the Laois Intermediate Football Championship.

Sarsfields won their first Laois Ladies Senior Football Championship in 2008.

Sarsfields are one of the most successful ladies football clubs in Laois having won the Laois Ladies Senior Football Championship 9 times during which they set won a record 7 years in a row from 2013 to 2019. They also made 16 consecutive appearances in the Laois Ladies Senior Football Championship final from 2006 to 2021.

They have won the Leinster Ladies' Senior Club Football Championship 3 times (2008,2013,2014).

In 2022, their second team won the Laois Junior Football Championship.

== Honours ==
Competition	Years won
Leinster Ladies' Senior Club Football Championship|	2008, 2013, 2014,
Laois Ladies Senior Football Championship	2008, 2011, 2013, 2014, 2015, 2016, 2017, 2018, 2019
Laois Ladies Intermediate Football Championship	2001
Laois Ladies Junior Football Championship	2000, 2001, 2009, 2022
