= 2015 All Ireland Ladies' Club Football Championship =

All-Ireland Senior Club Hurling Championship 2015
Championship Details
- Teams: 4

All Ireland Champions
- Winners: Donaghmoyne (4th win)

All Ireland Runners-up
- Runners-up: Mourneabbey

Provincial Champions
- Munster: Mourneabbey
- Leinster: Foxrock Cabinteely
- Ulster: Donaghmoyne
- Connacht: Not Played

Championship Statistics
- Matches Played: 3

The 2015 All Ireland Ladies' Club Football Championship was the 39th edition of the All-Ireland Ladies' Club Football Championship.

Donaghmoyne (Monaghan) won the title after defeating Mourneabbey by 0-11 to 0-8 in the final.

== Qualification ==
Quarterfinal

Semifinals
Donaghmoyne | 1-8
Foxrock–Cabinteely | 0-7
Mourneabbey | 2-11
Kilkerrin Clonberne | 2-10

Final
Donaghmoyne | 0-11
Mourneabbey | 0-8

== Results ==
=== All Ireland Ladies' Club Football Championship ===
| 22 November 2015 Semifinal | Donaghmoyne | 1-8 : 1-7 | Foxrock–Cabinteely | Donaghmoyne |

| 22 November 2015 Semifinal | Mourneabbey | 2-11 : 2-10 | Kilkerrin Clonberne | Mourneabbey |

| 6 December 2015 Final | Donaghmoyne | 0-11 : 0-8 | Mourneabbey | Gaelic Grounds |
| | | | | Referee: F Murphy (Cork) |
