= St Mary's Rochfortbridge GAA =

Gaelic football club in County Westmeath, Ireland

St Mary's, Rochfortbridge
- Naomh Mhuire, Droichead Chaisleáin Lóiste
- Founded: 1950
- County: Westmeath
- Nickname: The Bridge
- Colours: Green and White
- Grounds: Father Eamon O'Brien Park (main grounds); Fr Delaney Park (training)
- Coordinates: 53°25′01.02″N 7°18′08.80″W

Playing kits
Standard colours

Senior Club Championships
	All Ireland	Leinster champions	Westmeath champions
Football:	0	0	8
Hurling:	0	0	0
Ladies' football:	0	8	?

St Mary's is the Gaelic football club in the village of Rochfortbridge, Westmeath, Ireland.

== History - Mens Team ==
St Mary's was founded, in 1950, with the amalgamation of two other clubs: Gibbonstown and Rochfortbridge Warriors. In total, St Mary's have won three Senior championships, with six final appearances. The original Gaelic Athletic Association club in the village - Rochfortbridge Warriors - date back much further and won five Senior championships and appeared in a further six finals.

St Mary's won the Westmeath Senior Football Championship in their first year of existence and also won in 1954 and 1962.

In 2003, St Mary's were relegated from the Senior ranks. They won the Intermediate championship at the first time of asking in 2004, but were relegated to Intermediate in 2006 and Junior in 2007. They won the Junior championship straight away in 2008, eventually progressing to the Leinster Junior Club Final, which they lost. They have retained Intermediate status since then, reaching the semi-final of the championship in 2011.

At underage, St Mary's has had some success. The U12s won a Div 2 league 2004 and Div 1 league 2010. At U14, there were Div 3 champions in 2005 and 2009, won a Div 1 championship in 2011 and had a Div 4 final appearance in 2014. At U16, there were Div 2 league titles (2007, 2010) and a Div 2 championship in 2008. At minor level, there was a Div 1 league title in 2007 and a Div 2 final appearance in 2014.

Off the field, the club added to the facilities of the club's main grounds by installing a floodlit astroturf pitch in 2007. The club also maintains Fr Delaney Park as a separate training ground.

St Mary's defeated Shandonagh in the Intermediate final in 2017 by 1.11 to 1.10 to move back into the senior tier. As of 2023, St.Mary’s were competing at Intermediate level.

== History - Ladies Team ==
The ladies team in Rochfortbridge was originally an independent club founded in the 1970s. It was a very strong club during the emergence of Ladies Gaelic Football in that era and dominated the Westmeath championship and followed the dominance through to the Leinster Ladies' Senior Club Football Championship where its remains at the top of the roll of honour including a run of 5 championships in a row. The team also reached the All-Ireland Ladies' Club Football Championship on 6 occasions during that period including four finals against Ballymacarbry LGFC, without a win.

== Honours - Mens Team ==
- Westmeath Senior Football Championship (3): 1950, 1954, 1962 (as Rochfortbridge Warriors (5): 1915, 1917, 1923, 1925, 1928)
- Westmeath Intermediate Football Championship (4): 1978, 1995, 2004, 2017
- Westmeath Junior Football Championship (1): 2008

== Honours - Ladies Team ==
- Leinster Ladies' Senior Club Football Championship (7): 1980, 1982, 1989, 1990, 1991, 1992, 1994.
- Runner-up (7): 1978, 1979, 1981, 1983, 1984, 1986, 1996.
- All-Ireland Ladies' Club Football Championship (7): 1980, 1982, 1989, 1991, 1992, 1994.

== Notable players ==
- Damien Gavin - All-Ireland Minor Championship Captain 1995
- David Mitchell
- Damien Healy - Leinster Senior Football Championship 2004
