= Damien Healy =

Gaelic football player

Personal information
- Native name: Damian Ó hÉilí (Irish)
- Born: Mullingar, Ireland
- Occupation: Lecturer
- Height: 1.85 m (6 ft 1 in)

Sport
- Sport: Gaelic football
- Position: Centre Back
Clubs
- Years: Club
- St Mary's Rochfortbridge, County Westmeath, Ireland.
Inter-county
- Years: County
- 1996–2010: Westmeath
Inter-county titles
- Leinster titles: 1
- NFL: 3

Damien Healy is a former Gaelic footballer from County Westmeath, Ireland. He played for the Westmeath county team from 1996 to 2010. He won National League Division 2 medals in 2001, 2003 and 2008, and was centre back on the 2004 Leinster Championship winning team. He also won Railway Cup honours with Leinster. He played his club football with St Mary's Rochfortbridge.
