= Brendan Quigley =

Personal information
- Born: 19 January 1986 (age 40) Portlaoise, Ireland
- Height: 1.95 m (6 ft 5 in)

Sport
- Sport: Gaelic football
- Position: Midfield
Clubs
- Years: Club
- 2003–2010 2011 2012–: Timahoe; Fingallians; Timahoe
Inter-county
- Years: County
- 2006–: Laois

Brendan Quigley (born 19 January 1986) is a Gaelic footballer from County Laois. He usually plays at midfield or full-forward.

In 2003, Quigley was part of the Laois team that won the All-Ireland Minor Football Championship title for the first time since 1997.

In 2004, he was part of the minor team which won the Leinster Minor Football Championship. The following year saw him offered a chance to play Australian rules football along with his colleague Colm Begley, as he travelled to Australia to undergo a trial for the Brisbane Lions.

In 2006, Quigley returned home to Ireland and was part of the Laois team that won the Leinster U21 Football Championship and graduated onto the county's senior team later that season, forming a successful midfield partnership with his club colleague, Pauric Clancy.

2007 saw Laois retain the Leinster Under-21 Football Championship with Brendan again starring in midfield as they beat Offaly to retain the title. He was due to join the Carlton Blues AFL team at the end of the year. However, he did not complete his trial due to finishing his apprenticeship and decided to remain in Ireland. He instead became part of the Laois squad for the 2008 All-Ireland Senior Football Championship.

He played his club football with Timahoe and helped them to win Laois Intermediate Football Championship's in 2004 and 2010. In 2011 he joined Dublin side Fingallians, he returned to Timahoe after a year.
