= Chris Bergin =

Laois Gaelic footballer

Personal information
- Born: Ireland

Sport
- Sport: Gaelic football
- Position: Corner forward
Club
- Years: Club
- The Heath
Inter-county
- Years: County
- Laois

Chris Bergin is a Gaelic footballer who played for the Laois county team.
