= Connacht Ladies' Senior Club Football Championship =

Club Football Event

- Code: Ladies' Football
- Founded: 1977
- Title holders: Kilkerrin-Clonberne (10th title)
- Most titles: Carnacon (Mayo) (16 titles)

The list of winners below is generated, primarily, using the Roll of Honour from the Connacht LGFA website. With their win in 2016, Carnacon became the most successful provincial club in Ladies' Football with 15 wins, passing out Ballymacarbry (Waterford) who have 14 Munster titles. Carnacon have now moved to 16 titles.

Kilkerrin-Clonberne are the 2025 champions and will now represent Connacht in the All Ireland series.

This is a work-in-progress and all finals from 1977-2019 will be completed. Only the match details from 1980, 1992 & 1993 are missing.

== Key ==
All-Ireland winners
All-Ireland finalists

== By year ==
Year	Venue	Winner	County	Runner-up	County
2025	Castlerea	Kilkerrin-Clonberne 3-21	Galway	St Brigid's 0-09	Roscommon
2024	Swinford	Kilkerrin-Clonberne 1-08	Galway	Westport 1-07	Mayo
2023	Swinford	Kilkerrin-Clonberne 2-15	Galway	Knockmore 1-07	Mayo
2022	Charlestown	Kilkerrin-Clonberne 1-15	Galway	Burrishoole 0-04	Mayo
2021	Swinford	Kilkerrin-Clonberne 4-22	Galway	Glencar-Manorhamilton 1-06	Leitrim
2020	Markievicz Park	Kilkerrin-Clonberne 2-26	Galway	St Nathy's 0-02	Sligo
2019	Enfield	Kilkerrin-Clonberne 3-21	Galway	Kilbride 1-06	Roscommon
2018	Ballyhaunis	Kilkerrin-Clonberne 3-04	Galway	Carnacon 1-08	Mayo
2017	Ballyhaunis	Carnacon 4-10 5-17	Mayo	Kilkerrin-Clonberne 2-13 6-14	Galway
2016	Charlestown	Carnacon 8-20	Mayo	Kiltubrid 1-09	Leitrim
2015	Kilglass	Kilkerrin-Clonberne 6-19	Galway	Kiltubrid 0-07	Leitrim
2014	Ballyhaunis	Kilkerrin-Clonberne 0-12	Galway	Carnacon 2-05	Mayo
2013	Ballilough	Carnacon 0-19	Mayo	Kilkerrin-Clonberne 0-11	Galway
2012	Tuam	Carnacon 3-15	Mayo	St Brigid's 2-09	Roscommon
2011	Claremorris	Carnacon 0-15	Mayo	St Brigid's 0-05	Roscommon
2010	Kiltoom	Carnacon 6-14	Mayo	St Brigid's 1-05	Roscommon
2009	Clogher	Carnacon 1-12	Mayo	Corofin 1-08	Galway
2008	Clogher	Carnacon 3-8	Mayo	St Brigid's 2-05	Roscommon
2007	Corofin	Carnacon 1-11	Mayo	Corofin 1-06	Galway
2006	Hyde Park	Carnacon 1-19	Mayo	St Brigid's 0-01	Roscommon
2005	Clogher	St Brendans, Ballygar 2-12	Galway	Carnacon 2-09	Mayo
2004	Corofin	Carnacon 0-15	Mayo	Corofin 1-06	Galway
2003	Clogher	Carnacon 1-12	Mayo	Corofin 2-08	Galway
2002	Clogher	Carnacon 2-13	Mayo	Padraig Pearses 0-10	Roscommon
2001	Clogher	Carnacon 2-20	Mayo	Corofin 2-05	Galway
2000	Clonbur	Carnacon 2-12	Mayo	Kilkerrin-Clonberne 0-06	Galway
1999		Hollymount	Mayo	no opposition	
1998	Clogher	Carnacon 1-09	Mayo	St Brendan's, Ballygar 2-04	Galway
1997	Johnstown	Hollymount 0-10	Mayo	Clan na Gael 1-05	Roscommon
1996	Hollymount	Hollymount 3-11	Mayo	Clan na Gael 1-03	Roscommon
1995 aet	Ballymote	Clan na Gael 3-08	Roscommon	Shamrock Gaels 1-13	Sligo
1994	Ballinlough	The Neale 2-05	Mayo	Shamrock Gaels 1-01	Sligo
1993	tbf	St Grellans	Galway		
1992	tbf	St Grellans	Galway		
1991	Tubbercurry	Hollymount 1-12	Mayo	Tubbercurry 0-07	Sligo
1990	Ballinasloe	St Grellans 2-05	Galway	Hollymount 1-06	Mayo
1989	Hollymount	Hollymount 3-08	Mayo	St Grellans 2-07	Galway
1988	Gort	St Grellans 0-04	Galway	Hollymount 0-3	Mayo
1987	Garrymore	Hollymount 5-04	Mayo	St Grellans 1-07	Galway
1986	Headford	Hollymount 4-08	Mayo	Headford 0-04	Galway
1985	Garrymore	Hollymount 2-09	Mayo	Fenagh 0-00	Leitrim
1984	record expunged				
1983	Drumshanbo	Galway Gaels 5-04	Galway	Fenagh 1-02	Leitrim
1982	Headford	Galway Gaels 6-09	Galway	Tourmakeady 3-01	Mayo
1981	Manorhamilton	Galway Gaels 4-05	Galway	Glenfarna 0-06	Leitrim
1980	tbf	Galway Gaels	Galway		
1979	Johnstown	Fr Griffins 2-07	Galway	St Comans 2-03	Roscommon
1978		St Barrys	Roscommon	no opposition	
1977		St Comans	Roscommon	no opposition	

== By Club ==
Club	Winners	First	Last	Finalists	First	Last
Carnacon (Mayo)	16	1998	2017	3	2005	2018
Kilkerrin-Clonberne (Galway)	10	2014	2025	3	2000	2017
Hollymount (Mayo)	8	1985	1999	2	1988	1990
St Grellans (Galway)	4	1988	1993	2	1987	1989
Galway Gaels (Galway)	4	1980	1983	0	-	
Clan na Gael (Roscommon)	1	1995		2	1996	1997
St Brendans, Ballygar (Galway)	1	2005		1	1998	
St Comans (Roscommon)	1	1977		1	1979	
St Barrys (Roscommon)	1	1978		0	-	
Fr Griffins (Galway)	1	1979		0	-	
The Neale (Mayo)	1	1994		0	-	
St Brigid's (Roscommon)	0	-		6	1979	2025
Corofin (Galway)	0	-		5	2001	2009
Kiltubrid (Leitrim)	0	-		2	2015	2016
Shamrock Gaels (Sligo)	0	-		2	1994	1995
Fenagh (Leitrim)	0	-		2	1983	1985
Westport (Mayo)	0	-		1	2024	
Knockmore (Mayo)	0	-		1	2023	
Burrishoole (Mayo)	0	-		1	2022	
Glencar–Manorhamilton (Leitrim)	0	-		1	2021	
St Nathy's (Sligo)	0	-		1	2020	
Kilbride (Roscommon)	0	-		1	2019	
Pádraig Pearses (Roscommon)	0	-		1	2002	
Tubbercurry (Sligo)	0	-		1	1991	
Headford (Galway)	0	-		1	1986	
Tourmakeady (Mayo)	0	-		1	1982	
Glenfarna (Leitrim)	0	-		1	1981	

- colours are of the club as it exists now. Galway Gaels have been attributed their county colours.

== By County ==
County	Winners	Clubs	First	Last	Finalists	Clubs	First	Last
Mayo	25	3	1985	2017	9	6	1982	2024
Galway	20	5	1979	2025	12	6	1986	2017
Roscommon	3	3	1977	1995	11	5	1979	2025
Leitrim	0	0	-		6	4	1981	2021
Sligo	0	0	-		4	3	1991	2020
