= Pat Roe =

Personal information
- Native name: Pádraig Ó Ruadh (Irish)
- Nickname: Pine cone
- Born: Ireland

Sport
- Sport: Gaelic football
- Position: Defence/Midfield
Club
- Years: Club
- ?–?: The Heath
Club titles
- Laois titles: 2 (1 football) 1 (hurling)
Inter-county
- Years: County
- 1982–1995: Laois
Inter-county titles
- Leinster titles: 1

Pat Roe is a former Gaelic football manager and player. He played at senior level for the Laois county team and later managed three county teams: Carlow, Wexford and Offaly.

== Playing career ==
Roe played for the Laois senior football team from the mid-1980s until the 1990s primarily as a defender but also in midfield.

He also played on the county senior hurling team for some time.

In 1982, he was full back on the Laois team that captured the Leinster U21 Football Championship and in 1991, he played on the Laois team beaten by Meath in the final of the Leinster Senior Football Championship.

He began his club football career with Portlaoise with whom he won minor and under 21 honours but it with his second club The Heath that Roe played a starring role in 1993 when they won the Laois Senior Football Championship title. The previous year he picked up a Laois Senior Hurling Championship medal with his hurling club, Clonad.

== Managerial career ==
A PE and English teacher at St Fergal's College in Rathdowney, Roe began his managerial career in The Heath in 1991 while still playing. Crettyard obtained his services in 1996.

After his senior inter-county playing career ended, Roe continued to play at club level while also having spells as manager with Carlow (2001–2002), Wexford (2003–2005) and Offaly (2007–2008).

While he was Wexford manager a request for payment attributed to Roe appeared in the minutes of a Wexford County Board meeting. Roe, it was alleged in the minutes, had asked for a €5,000 bonus if Wexford won its 2005 National Football League final against Armagh, whilst €3,000 would suffice in the event of a loss.

Roe resigned as Wexford manager when the team's 2005 campaign ended and later said that he had lost his appetite for management due to "pressure increases". Roe stated: "I don't know how the likes of Mick O'Dwyer and Seán Boylan do it year after year, but I just couldn't".
