= Portobello GAA =

Gaelic games club in County Dublin, Ireland

- CLG Portobello
- Founded: 1974
- County: Dublin
- Nickname: Porto Bello
- Colours: Black and White
- Grounds: Leinster Road, Rathmines, Dublin 6

Playing kits
Standard colours

Senior Club Championships
	All Ireland	Leinster champions	Dublin champions
Football:	-	0	0
Ladies' football:	–	1	6

Portobello GAA is a Gaelic Athletic Association club based in the Rathmines area of the south side of Dublin in Ireland. The club has adult men's football, hurling, camogie, ladies' Gaelic football and handball teams.

== History ==
Portobello GAA was founded in 1974 to support local participation in Gaelic games. The club is focused on Gaelic football and hurling, and is known for attracting players who have relocated to Dublin from other parts of the country that wished to continue playing Gaelic games. As such, Portobello has gained a reputation as a "country club" in the city.

Liz Howard, former president of the Camogie Association, was a member of the club from 2006 onwards.

In 2024, the French national GAA team played their first ever 15 a side game against Portobello at Leinster Road. The French ambassador to Ireland, Vincent Guérend, attended the game.

== Teams ==
Portobello GAA, which has no juvenile divisions, fields both men's and ladies' teams in Gaelic football and hurling:

- Men's football: Portobello fields a men's football team that compete in Division 9 of the Dublin League and in the Junior 2 Championship.
- Ladies' football: It also has a Ladies football team competing in Division 5 of the Dublin league.
- Hurling: The club has also fields a men's hurling team. This team played their first competitive hurling fixture on 16 June 2020 against Na Gaeil Óga in Phoenix Park.
- Camogie: The camogie team play alongside Kevins forming CBC/Portobello in the Dublin Intermediate Championship.

The club is based in the Dublin 6 area, around Rathmines and Portobello. Its grounds are based at Leinster Road, beside Cathal Brugha Barracks while the camogie team plays at Phoenix Park.

== Honours ==
- Leinster Ladies' Senior Club Football Championship (1) 1998
- Dublin Ladies' Senior Football Championship (6) 1992,1995,1996, 1997, 1998, 1999
- Dublin Junior H Hurling Championship (1) 2021
- Dublin Junior G Hurling Championship (1): 2022
- Dublin Hurling League AHL 8 (1) 2023
- All-Ireland Softball (60X30) Silver Masters Doubles 2007 (Seamus O'Mahony of Portobello, along with Frank Semple)
