= 2017 All-Ireland Ladies' Club Football Championship =

== Senior provincial finals ==
=== Connacht ===
Final

29 October 2017; 2:00 pm	Carnacon	5-17 - 6-14	Kilkerrin-Clonberne	Ballyhaunis; Referee: John Niland (Curry); Man of the Match: Cora Staunton
29 October 2017; 2:00 pm	Cora Staunton 4-13 (3-0 pen, 1-2f), Louise Dowling 1-1, Amy Dowling 0-2, Martha Carter 0-1		Annette Clarke 3-4 (2-0 pen, 0-1f), Louise Ward 2-0, Olivia Divilly 0-6 (0-5f), Lyndsey Noone 1-0, Claire Dunleavy, Nicola Ward, Hannah Noone, Ailish Morrissey 0-1 each	Ballyhaunis; Referee: John Niland (Curry); Man of the Match: Cora Staunton

Replay

5 November 2017; 2:00 pm Replay	Carnacon	4-10 - 2-13	Kilkerrin-Clonberne	Ballyhaunis; Referee: Gus Chapman; Man of the Match: Fiona McHale
5 November 2017; 2:00 pm Replay	Cora Staunton 1-6 (1-5f), Amy Dowling 1-1, Briana Bruton and Emma Cosgrave 1-0 each, Martha Carter, Marie Corbett, Aoife Brennan 0-1 each	Report	Olivia Divilly 0-8 (0-5f), Siobhan Divilly and Hannah Noone 1-0 each, Chloe Miskell 0-3, Nicola Ward and Caoimhe Boyle 0-1 each	Ballyhaunis; Referee: Gus Chapman; Man of the Match: Fiona McHale

=== Leinster ===
29 October 2017; 2:00 pm	Foxrock–Cabinteely	4-17 - 1-7	Confey	Coralstown/Kinnegad GFC; Referee: Stephen McNulty (St. Patrick's); Man of the Match: Amy Ring
29 October 2017; 2:00 pm	Amy Ring 2-13 (1-0 pen, 0-7f), Hannah O'Neill 2-1, Roisin McGovern, Sinéad Goldrick, Fiona Claffey 0-1 each	Report	Aine Gately 1-2, Rachel Divilly 0-4f, Sarah Munnelly 0-1	Coralstown/Kinnegad GFC; Referee: Stephen McNulty (St. Patrick's); Man of the Match: Amy Ring

=== Munster ===
27 October 2017; 8:00 pm	Mourneabbey	3-9 - 0-11	Ballymacarbry	WIT Sports Campus; Referee: Seamus Mulvihill (St Senans)
27 October 2017; 8:00 pm	Ciara O'Suliavan 2-2, Maire O'Callaghan 1-0, Doireann O'Sullivan 0-3f, Laura Fitzgerald 0-2, Brid O'Sullivan and Ellie Jack (0-1f) 0-1 each		Linda Wall 0-6, Michelle Ryan 0-3, Aileen Wall and Sinead Ryan (0-1f) 0-1 each	WIT Sports Campus; Referee: Seamus Mulvihill (St Senans)

=== Ulster ===
5 November 2017; 2:00 pm	St. Macartans	3-4 - 1-8	Donaghmoyne	Emyvale; Referee: Brendan Rice (Warrenpoint)
5 November 2017; 2:00 pm	Paula Donnelly 2-0, Cathy Maguire 1-1, Joline Donnelly 0-2 (0-1f), Colleen McQuaid 0-1	Report	Louise Kerley 1-4 (1-0 pen, 0-3f), Fiona Courtney, Rosemary Courtney, Gina Comiskey, Eileen McElroy 0-1 each	Emyvale; Referee: Brendan Rice (Warrenpoint)

== All Ireland Senior Semi-Finals ==
18 November 2017; 3:00 pm	Mourneabbey	4-5 - 0-15	Foxrock–Cabinteely	Bray Emmets; Referee: Stephen McNulty (St. Patrick's)
18 November 2017; 3:00 pm	Laura Fitzgerald 2-3 (1-0 pen, 0-1f), Ciara O'Sullivan and Doireann O'Sullivan (0-1f) 1-1 each	Report	Amy Ring 0-6 (0-5f), Fiona Claffey 0-4, Sinéad Goldrick and Ciara O'Riordan 0-2 each, Jodie Egan 0-1	Bray Emmets; Referee: Stephen McNulty (St. Patrick's)

19 November 2017; 2:00 pm	Carnacon	3-14 - 0-8	St. Macartan's	Augher; Referee: Colm McManus (Gaeil Colmcille)
19 November 2017; 2:00 pm	Cora Staunton 1-7 (0-5f), Amy Dowling 1-3, Fiona McHale 1-2, Louise Dowling and Aoife Brennan 0-1 each	Report	Cathy McGuire 0-3 (0-2f), Chloe McCaffrey 0-2 (0-1f), Niamh McGirr, Lynda Donnelly, Colleen McQuaid 0-1 each	Augher; Referee: Colm McManus (Gaeil Colmcille)

19 November 2017; 1:00 pm	Latton	v	Dunboyne	Latton; Referee: Margaret Farrelly (Laragh United)

19 November 2017; 1:00 pm	Kinsale	v	Moycullen	Kinsale; Referee: Niall McCormack

== 2017 All-Ireland Ladies' Junior Club Football Championship ==
Semi-finals

19 November 2017; 1:00 pm	Corduff	v	Cuala	Corduff; Referee: Des McEnry (Garrycastle)

19 November 2017; 2:00 pm	Tuam/Cortoon	v	Aghada	Tuam Stadium; Referee: Gerry Carmody (Ballaghaderreen)
