= Mark Timmons =

Irish Gaelic footballer (born 1986)

Personal information
- Native name: Marc Mac Toimín (Irish)
- Born: 10 May 1986 (age 40) Graiguecullen, Ireland
- Height: 1.88 m (6 ft 2 in)

Sport
- Sport: Gaelic Football
- Position: Full Back
Club
- Years: Club
- 2003-: Graiguecullen
Inter-county
- Years: County
- 2005-: Laois

Mark Timmons (born 10 May 1986) is a Gaelic footballer from County Laois. He has played up to and including senior level for his county.

He usually plays in defence for Laois and in 2004, he was part of the minor team which won the Leinster Minor Football Championship.

In 2006 and 2007, Timmons was part of the Laois team that won two successive Leinster U21 Football Championship titles.

At club level, Timmons usually lines out as a full back with Graiguecullen.

Timmons also has a little girl who was born the day he played in the U21 final 2007 against Cork.
