= Denis Lalor =

Irish hurler and Gaelic footballer

Personal information
- Born: Ireland

Sport
- Sport: Gaelic football
- Position: Half back/Midfield
Club
- Years: Club
- ? -?: The Heath
Inter-county
- Years: County
- ?- ?: Laois

Denis Lalor is a former hurling and Gaelic football player from County Laois in Ireland.

== Career ==
Lalor played on the Laois senior football team throughout the 1990s, primarily as a defender but also in attack. In 1991, he played on the Laois team beaten by Meath in the final of the Leinster Senior Football Championship. He also won two Railway Cup football medals with Leinster in 1996 and 1997.

Lalor was the captain of his club The Heath in 1993 when they won the Laois Senior Football Championship title. The previous year he had received a Laois Senior Hurling Championship medal with his hurling club, Clonad.

After his senior inter-county career ended, Lalor continued to play at club level, while also serving as a selector with the Laois senior football team under Tom Cribbin. He also had spells as club manager with Gracefield in Offaly and his home club, The Heath. In 2008 he was appointed as manager of the Laois minor football team for the 2009 season.
