= Daithí Carroll =

Irish Gaelic footballer

Personal information
- Native name: Daithí Ó Cearbhaill (Irish)
- Born: 1987 (age 38–39) Portlaoise, County Laois
- Height: 6 ft 1 in (185 cm)

Sport
- Sport: Gaelic football
- Position: Forward
Club
- Years: Club
- The Heath
Inter-county
Years	County	Apps (scores)
2011	Laois	4 (0-6)

Daithí Carroll (born 1987) is a Gaelic footballer for Laois.

He plays club football for his local club The Heath and previously played for Laois. He was regarded as one of the county's best young forwards and was introduced to the senior panel during the National League Final 2011 but has not played for the county team since that year.
