= All-Ireland Ladies' Club Football Championship =

Ladies' Gaelic football competition for club football teams

- Code: Ladies' Football
- Founded: 1977
- Trophy: Dolores Tyrrell Memorial Cup
- Title holders: Kilkerrin-Clonberne (5th title)
- Most titles: Ballymacarbry – Waterford (10 titles)

The All-Ireland Ladies' Club Football Championship is the ladies' Gaelic football competition for club football teams. The winners are awarded the Dolores Tyrrell Memorial Cup.

The current holders are Kilkerrin-Clonberne of Galway who defeated St Ergnat's Moneyglass of Antrim in the 2025 final to claim their fifth consecutive title.

== Senior championships ==
=== Senior finals listed by year ===
Year	Venue	Winning team	County	Score	Losing team	County	Score
2025	Croke Park	Kilkerrin-Clonberne	Galway	2-08	St Ergnat's Moneyglass	Antrim	1-05
2024	Croke Park	Kilkerrin-Clonberne	Galway	0-13	Kilmacud Crokes	Dublin	0-09
2023	Croke Park	Kilkerrin-Clonberne	Galway	0-18	Ballymacarbry	Waterford	1-09
2022	Croke Park	Kilkerrin-Clonberne	Galway	0-13	Donaghamoyne	Monaghan	0-07
2021	Birr	Kilkerrin-Clonberne	Galway	1-11	Mourneabbey	Cork	1-07
2019	Gaelic Grounds	Mourneabbey	Cork	2-09	Kilkerrin-Clonberne	Galway	0-14
2018	Parnell Park	Mourneabbey	Cork	1-13	Foxrock–Cabinteely	Dublin	1-06
2017	Parnell Park	Carnacon	Mayo	0-15	Mourneabbey	Cork	1-10
2016	Parnell Park	Donaghmoyne	Monaghan	2-09	Foxrock–Cabinteely	Dublin	0-08
2015	Parnell Park	Donaghmoyne	Monaghan	0-11	Mourneabbey	Cork	0-08
2014	Tuam	Termon	Donegal	3-12	Mourneabbey	Cork	1-13
2013	Carrick-on-Shannon	Carnacon	Mayo	1-06	Donaghmoyne	Monaghan	0-08
2012	Ballinamore	Donaghmoyne	Monaghan	1-10	Carnacon	Mayo	1-05
2011	Ballymahon	Carnacon	Mayo	2-12	Na Fianna	Dublin	2-04
2010	Cashel	Inch Rovers	Cork	0-09	Carnacon	Mayo	0-07
2009	Banagher	Donaghmoyne	Monaghan	2-07	Donoughmore	Cork	1-08
2008	O'Connor Park	Carnacon	Mayo	2-11	Inch Rovers	Cork	2-06
2007	Banagher	Carnacon	Mayo	2-14	Inch Rovers	Cork	1-06
2006	Dromard	Donaghmoyne	Monaghan	1-11	Carnacon	Mayo	0-13
2005	Drogheda	Ballyboden St Endas	Dublin	1-06	Donaghmoyne	Monaghan	0-06
2004	Birr	Ballyboden St Enda's	Dublin	2-07	Donoughmore	Cork	1-09
2003	Nowlan Park	Donoughmore	Cork	2-14	Seneschalstown	Meath	1-06
2002	Mullingar	Carnacon	Mayo	2-14	Carrickmore	Tyrone	0-10
2001	Birr	Donoughmore	Cork	3-06	Ballyboden St Enda's	Dublin	0-08
2000	St Loman's, Mullingar	Monaghan Harps	Monaghan	2-07	Timahoe	Laois	1-03
1999r 1999d	Portarlington	Shelmaliers	Wexford	3-08	Hollymount	Mayo	3-04
1999r 1999d	Lusmagh	Shelmaliers	Wexford	1-06	Hollymount	Mayo	1-06
1998	Birr	Ballymacarbry	Waterford	2-15	Portobello	Dublin	0-08
1997	New Ross	Ballymacarbry	Waterford	5-10	Shelmaliers	Wexford	0-03
1996	Pairc Tailteann	Shelmaliers	Wexford	3-09	St. Eunan's	Donegal	1-07
1995	Fraher Field	Ballymacarbry	Waterford	4-12	Parnells	London	1-04
1994	Semple Stadium	Ballymacarbry	Waterford	3-12	Rochfortbridge	Westmeath	1-06
1993	Semple Stadium	Ballymacarbry	Waterford	2-12	Crettyard	Laois	1-02
1992	Athy	Ballymacarbry	Waterford	3-08	Rochfortbridge	Westmeath	1-02
1991	Dr Cullen Park	Ballymacarbry	Waterford	0-09	Rochfortbridge	Westmeath	1-04
1990	Semple Stadium	Ballymacarbry	Waterford	4-09	St. Grellan's	Galway	0-03
1989	Athy	Ballymacarbry	Waterford	0-09	Rochfortbridge	Westmeath	0-03
1988	Callan	Adamstown	Wexford	2-06	Ballymacarbry	Waterford	1-04
1987	O'Connor Park	Ballymacarbry	Waterford	4-10	Hollymount	Mayo	1-02
1986	Tipperary	The Heath	Laois	3-04	Castleisland	Kerry	1-05
1985	Cashel	The Heath	Laois	3-02	Ballymacarbry	Waterford	1-06
1984	The Heath	St Enda's	Cork	2-04	The Heath	Laois	1-05
1983	The Heath	Castleisland	Kerry	0-09	The Heath	Laois	1-05
1982	Geashill	Galway Gaels	Galway	4-04	Rochfortbridge	Westmeath	1-02
1981	Watergrasshill	Watergrasshill	Cork	1-02	Galway Gaels	Galway	1-01
1980	Dolla	Castleisland	Kerry	2-07	Rochfortbridge	Westmeath	3-01
1979	Portarlington	Newtownshandrum	Cork	1-07	Mullahoran	Cavan	0-02
1978	Portarlington	Newtownshandrum	Cork	4-06	Mullahoran	Cavan	1-09
1977	Pearse Park	Mullahoran	Cavan	4-05	St Comans	Roscommon	2-01

- Ladies' national website incorrectly states that in 1977 Mullahoran beat Newtownshandrum.

== Summary of All-Ireland champions ==
=== By club ===
Team	County	Winners	Years won	Runners-up	Years runners-up
Ballymacarbry	Waterford	10	1987, 1989, 1990, 1991, 1992, 1993, 1994, 1995, 1997, 1998	3	1985, 1988, 2023
Carnacon	Mayo	6	2002, 2007, 2008, 2011, 2013, 2017	3	2006, 2010, 2012
Donaghmoyne	Monaghan	5	2006, 2009, 2012, 2015, 2016	3	2005, 2013, 2022
Kilkerrin-Clonberne	Galway	5	2021, 2022, 2023, 2024, 2025	1	2019
Mourneabbey	Cork	2	2018, 2019	4	2014, 2015, 2017, 2021
The Heath	Laois	2	1985, 1986	2	1983, 1984
Donoughmore	Cork	2	2001, 2003	2	2004, 2009
Castleisland	Kerry	2	1980, 1983	1	1986
Shelmaliers	Wexford	2	1996, 1999	1	1997
Ballyboden St Endas	Dublin	2	2004, 2005	1	2001
Newtownshandrum	Cork	2	1978, 1979	0	
Mullahoran	Cavan	1	1977	2	1978, 1979
Inch Rovers	Cork	1	2010	2	2007, 2008
Galway Gaels	Galway	1	1982	1	1981
Watergrasshill	Cork	1	1981	0	
St Enda's	Cork	1	1984	0	
Adamstown	Wexford	1	1988	0	
Monaghan Harps	Monaghan	1	2000	0	
Termon	Donegal	1	2014	0	
Rochfortbridge	Westmeath	0		6	1980, 1982, 1989, 1991, 1992, 1994
Hollymount	Mayo	0		2	1987, 1999
Foxrock Cabinteely	Dublin	0		2	2016, 2018
St Coman's	Roscommon	0		1	1977
St Grellan's	Galway	0		1	1990
Crettyard	Laois	0		1	1993
Parnells	London	0		1	1995
St Eunan's	Donegal	0		1	1996
Portobello	Dublin	0		1	1998
Timahoe	Laois	0		1	2000
Carrickmore	Tyrone	0		1	2002
Seneschalstowm	Meath	0		1	2003
Na Fianna	Dublin	0		1	2011
Kilmacud Crokes	Dublin	0		1	2024
St Ergnat's Moneyglass	Antrim	0		1	2025

=== Senior titles listed by county ===
L, M, U, C refer to Leinster/Munster/Ulster/Connacht championships won by teams from the county.

#	County	All-Irelands	Finalists	L	M	U	C	Last All-Ireland/provincial winners
1	Waterford clubs	10	3	–	17	–	–	Ballymacarbry, 1998 / Ballymacarbry, 2023
2	Cork clubs	9	8	–	24	–	–	Mourneabbey, 2019 / Mourneabbey, 2021
3	Mayo clubs	6	5	–	–	–	25	Carnacon, 2017 / Carnacon, 2017
3	Monaghan clubs	6	3	–	–	18	–	Donaghmoyne, 2015 / Donaghmoyne, 2022
3	Galway* clubs	6	3	–	–	–	20	Kilkerrin-Clonberne, 2024 / Kilkerrin-Clonberne, 2024
6	Wexford clubs	3	1	7	–	–	–	Shelmaliers, 1999 / Shelmaliers, 2012
7	Laois clubs	2	4	14	–	–	–	The Heath, 1986 / Sarsfields, 2014
7	Dublin clubs	2	6	18	–	–	–	Ballyboden St Endas, 2005 / Kilmacud Crokes, 2024
7	Kerry clubs	2	1	–	4	–	–	Castleisland, 1983 / Castleisland, 2024
10	Cavan clubs	1	2	–	–	8	–	Mullahoran, 1977 / Cnoc Bríd, 2003
10	Donegal clubs	1	1	–	–	6	–	Termon, 2014 / Termon, 2014
12	Westmeath clubs	0	6	7	–	–	–	Rochfortbridge, 1994
12	Antrim clubs	0	1	–	–	1	–	St Ergnat's Moneyglass, 2025
12	Meath clubs	0	1	2	–	–	–	Dunboyne, 2021
12	Tyrone clubs	0	1	–	–	5	–	St Macartans, 2017
12	Roscommon clubs	0	1	–	–	–	3	Clann na Gael, 1995
12	Offaly clubs	0	0	1	–	–	–	Tullamore, 1981
12	Clare clubs	0	0	–	2	–	–	The Banner, 2013
12	Tipperary clubs	0	0	–	1	–	–	Loughmore, 1977
12	Armagh clubs	0	0	–	–	2	–	Clann Éireann, 2024

- Galway deducted one All Ireland title (1984/85) and one Connacht title (1984).
- Mullahoran won the Ulster title or had no competition to represent Ulster from 1977 to 1983 inclusive.

=== Senior titles listed by province ===
Province	All-Irelands	Finalists	Most recent winning team	Most recent finalist
Munster clubs	21	12	Mourneabbey (Cork), 2019	Ballymacarbry (Waterford), 2023
Connacht* clubs	11	8	Kilkerrin-Clonberne (Galway), 2025	Kilkerrin-Clonberne (Galway), 2019
Ulster clubs	8	8	Donaghamoyne (Monaghan), 2016	St Ergnat's Moneyglass (Antrim), 2025
Leinster clubs	7	18	Ballyboden St Endas (Dublin), 2005	Kilmacud Crokes (Dublin), 2024
British clubs	0	1	–	Parnells (London), 1995

- Connacht deducted one All Ireland title (Galway Gaels 1984/85).

== Intermediate championships ==
=== Intermediate finals listed by year ===
Year	Winning team	County	Score	Losing team	County	Score
2025	Knockbride	Cavan	3-10	Caltra Cuans	Galway	0-04
2024	Bennekerry/Tinryland	Carlow	2-10	Annaghdown	Galway	1-07
2023	Glanmire	Cork	5-08	Ballinamore	Leitrim	1-06
2022	Longford Slashers	Longford	4-11	Mullinahone	Tipperary	2-08
2021	St Sylvester's	Dublin	1-06	Castlebar Mitchels	Mayo	0-07
2019	Naomh Ciaran	Offaly	2-11	Naomh Pol	Antrim	2-09
2018	Clontarf	Dublin	8-14	Aghabog	Monaghan	2-05
2017	Dunboyne	Meath	2-13	Kinsale	Cork	2-12
2016	Annaghdown	Galway	1-13	Shane O'Neill's	Armagh	3-05
2015	Milltown	Westmeath	2-14	Cahir	Tipperary	2-12
2014	Castleisland Desmonds	Kerry	2-11	Clonbur	Galway	1-07
2013	Claregalway	Galway	1-09	Thomas Davis	Dublin	0-09
2012	Parnells	London	2-14	Cahir	Tipperary	1-02
2011	Lisnaskea Emmetts	Fermanagh	1-10	Stabannon Parnells	Louth	0-12
2010	West Clare Gaels	Clare	3-09	St. Conleth's	Laois	0-08
2009	Brian Borus	Tipperary	1-09	St. Brigid's	Dublin	1-08
2008	Emyvale	Monaghan	3-06	Ballingeary-Inchigeela	Cork	1-02
2007	Mourneabbey	Cork	1-14	Glen	Derry	1-13
2006	Inch Rovers	Cork	3-09	Naomh Mearnog/St. Sylvester's	Dublin	1-10
2005	Abbeydorney	Kerry	2-13	Clainn Eire	Armagh	1-04
2004	St. Brigid's	Roscommon	1-08	Tyholland	Monaghan	0-04
2003	Naomh Abán	Cork	3-06	Parnells	London	1-07
2002	Rockban	Cork	5-01	Clan na nGael	Roscommon	2-08
2001	St. Brendan's	Galway	4-11	Donaghmoyne	Monaghan	2-04
2000	Rockchapel	Cork	5-11	Confey	Kildare	0-11
1999	Kilkerrin/Clonberne	Galway	2-06	Cooley Kickhams	Louth	1-03

- No club has won the title more than once.

=== Intermediate wins listed by county ===
County	Titles	Winning years
Cork	6	2000, 2002, 2003, 2006, 2007, 2023
Galway	4	1999, 2001, 2013, 2016
Kerry	2	2005, 2014
Dublin	2	2018, 2021
Roscommon	1	2004
Monaghan	1	2008
Tipperary	1	2009
Clare	1	2010
Fermanagh	1	2011
London	1	2012
Westmeath	1	2015
Meath	1	2017
Offaly	1	2019
Longford	1	2022
Carlow	1	2024
Cavan	1	2025

== Junior championships ==
=== Junior finals listed by year ===
Year	Winning team	County	Score	Losing team	County	Score
2025	Muckalee	Kilkenny	1-13	Cromane Ladies GFC	Kerry	2-09
2024	Mungret St. Paul's	Limerick	0-12	Na Dúnaibh	Donegal	0-04
2023	O'Donovan Rossa	Cork	2-07	Claremorris	Mayo	0-11
2022	Salthill-Knocknacarra	Galway	1-07	Naomh Abán	Cork	0-04
2021	St Jude's	Dublin	3-09	Mullinahone	Tipperary	1-08
2019 aet	Donoughmore	Cork	1-12	CL McHale Rovers	Mayo	1-11
2018	Glanmire	Cork	1-22	Tourlestrane	Sligo	3-11
2017	Aghada	Cork	2-06	Corduff	Monaghan	0-03
2016	St Maur's	Dublin	2-13	Kinsale	Cork	3-08
2015	Dunboyne	Meath	1-10	Bantry Blues	Cork	1-03
2014	Murroe/Boher	Limerick	3-11	St. Ciaran's	Roscommon	1-01
2013	Na Gaeil	Kerry	2-27	Dunedin Connollys	Scotland	1-05
2012	Thomas Davis	Dublin	1-12	Boherbue	Cork	1-07
2011	Sperrin Og	Tyrone	2-09	Aherlow	Tipperary	1-10
2010	Caltra Cuans	Galway	2-08	St. Enda's, Omagh	Tyrone	0-08
2009	Clonakilty	Cork	4-12	Drumcliffe-Rosses Point	Sligo	0-01
2008	Kilmihil	Clare	4-06	Knockmore	Mayo	1-04
2007	Foxrock–Cabinteely	Dublin	1-11	West Clare Gaels	Clare	0-07
2006	Eadestown	Kildare	2-04, 3-14 (R)	Emyvale	Monaghan	0-10, 0-04 (R)
2005	Mourneabbey	Cork	2-11	Athgarvan	Kildare	2-07
2004	Abbeydorney	Kerry	5-09	Inniskeen	Monaghan	3-08
2003	Gabriel Rangers	Cork	1-22	Fingallians	Dublin	0-08
2002	Tyholland	Monaghan	6-07	Cappawhite	Tipperary	1-09
2001	Rockban	Cork	6-07	Grangenolvin	Kildare	3-09
2000	Gerald Griffins	Limerick	1-11	Donaghmoyne	Monaghan	1-08
1999	Rockchapel	Cork	1-13	St. Nathy's	Sligo	1-07
1998	Cooley Kickhams	Louth	2-08	Naomh Abán	Cork	3-03
1997	Beaufort	Kerry	2-15	Aughawillan	Leitrim	3-04

- No club has won the title more than once.

=== Junior wins listed by county ===
County	Titles	Winning years
Cork	9	1999, 2001, 2003, 2005, 2009, 2017, 2018, 2019, 2023
Dublin	4	2007, 2012, 2016, 2021
Kerry	3	1997, 2004, 2013
Limerick	3	2000, 2014, 2024
Galway	2	2010, 2022
Louth	1	1998
Monaghan	1	2002
Kildare	1	2006
Clare	1	2008
Tyrone	1	2011
Meath	1	2015
Kilkenny	1	2025

== Outside Sources ==
- Ladies Gaelic Roll of Honour
