= Donal Brennan =

Irish Gaelic footballer from County Laois

Personal information
- Native name: Dónall Ó Braonáin (Irish)
- Nickname: Donie
- Born: 1986 (age 39–40) Arless, County Laois, Ireland

Sport
- Sport: Gaelic football
- Position: Corner forward
Club
- Years: Club
- Arles–Killeen
Inter-county
- Years: County
- 2004-: Laois
Inter-county titles
- Leinster titles: 3
- All-Irelands: 1

Donal Brennan (born 1986) is a Gaelic footballer from County Laois.

He usually plays in attack for Laois and in 2003 was part of the Laois team that won the All-Ireland Minor Football Championship title for the first time since 1997.

In 2004, he was part of the minor team which won the Leinster Minor Football Championship. That same year he made his debut with the Laois senior team in the replay of the Leinster Senior Football Championship final when Laois lost out to Westmeath.

In 2006 and again in 2007, Brennan was part of the Laois team that won the Leinster U21 Football Championship.

At club level, Brennan usually lines out as a forward with Arles–Killeen.
