= The Heath GAA =

Gaelic games club in County Laois, Ireland

The Heath
- An Fraoch
- Founded: 1888
- County: Laois
- Colours: Black and Amber
- Grounds: The Heath GAA Grounds, Ballydavis
- Coordinates: 53°03′56.87″N 7°12′55.02″W

Playing kits
Standard colours

Senior Club Championships
	All Ireland	Leinster champions	Laois champions
Football:	-	-	10
Ladies' football:	2	4	11

The Heath GAA is a Gaelic football, ladies' Gaelic football and rounders club in County Laois, Ireland, located to the northeast of Portlaoise.

== History ==
The club was founded in 1888. Originally the club was known as St. Patrick's. The club colours were scarlet and grey but nowadays they are black and amber.

The Heath have won 10 Laois Senior Football Championship titles, the last of which came in 1993.

Denis Lalor (who not only starred on the Laois Senior team but also won two Railway Cup medals with Leinster), Pat Roe and Chris Bergin are among The Heath's most famous players in recent times while Shane Hennessy, David O'Hara, Michael Clancy and Michael Lambe have all achieved the dream of playing in an All-Ireland Minor Football Championship Final.

Because The Heath is a football only club, a number of its players play hurling with Clonad or Park/Ratheniska.

== Achievements ==
- Laois Senior Football Championship: (10) 1913, 1918, 1920, 1957, 1958, 1960, 1961, 1962, 1974, 1993
- Laois Intermediate Football Championship: (4) 1943, 1953, 1986, 2022
- Laois Junior Football Championships: (6) 1914, 1930, 1949, 1985, 1990, 2009
- Laois Junior B Football Championship: (2) 1988, 1997
- Laois Junior C Football Championship: (1) 2010
- Laois Minor Football Championship: (2) 1994, 2005 (both with players from Park–Ratheniska)
- Laois Minor B Football Championship: (4) 1988, 2002, 2004, 2017
- Laois All-County Football League Div. 1: (2) 1976, 2016
- Laois All-County Football League Div. 2: (2) 2014, 2024
- Laois All-County Football League Div. 3: (2) 2004, 2009
- Laois All-County Football League Div. 5: (1) 2012

== Notable players ==
- Daithí Carroll
- Sue Ramsbottom (ladies' football)
- Tom Major
