= Barry Brennan (Laois footballer) =

Irish Gaelic footballer

Personal information
- Native name: Barra Ó Braonáin (Irish)
- Born: Ireland

Sport
- Sport: Gaelic football
- Position: -
Club
- Years: Club
- ? -?: Graiguecullen
Inter-county
Years	County	Apps (scores)
2003–2011	Laois	10 (1–9)
Inter-county titles
- Leinster titles: 1

Barry Brennan is a Gaelic footballer from County Laois.

He plays for the Graiguecullen club. He usually plays in the forwards for Laois and in 2003 was part of the Laois squad that won the Leinster Senior Football Championship title for the first time since 1946.

Brennan is son of former Graiguecullen and Laois senior football star, Willie Brennan, winner of a National Football League medal with Laois in 1986.
