= Andy Whelan =

Irish Gaelic football player

Personal information
- Born: Laois, Ireland

Sport
- Sport: Gaelic football
- Position: Goalkeeper
Club
- Years: Club
- ?: Jamestown
Club titles
- Leinster titles: ?
Inter-county
- Years: County
- 1940's: Laois
Inter-county titles
- Leinster titles: 1
- All Stars: 0

Andy Whelan was a footballer from County Laois.

He was a native of the Kildare border village of Jamestown, near Ballybrittas.

He played as goalkeeper when Laois won the Leinster Senior Football Championship final against Kildare in 1946.

Laois didn't win the Leinster Senior Football Championship again until 2003 when Mick O'Dwyer led them to victory and another Ballybrittas native, Fergal Byron was goalkeeper.
