= Aidan Fennelly =

Irish Gaelic footballer

Personal information
- Native name: Aodhán Ó Fionnghalaigh (Irish)
- Nickname: Fenno
- Born: 28 August 1981 (age 45) County Laois, Ireland
- Height: 5 ft 11 in (1.80 m)

Sport
- Sport: Gaelic football
- Position: Corner back
Club
- Years: Club
- 1998-2013: Portlaoise
Club titles
- Laois titles: 8
- Leinster titles: 2
Inter-county
- Years: County
- 1999 – 2011: Laois
Inter-county titles
- Leinster titles: 1
- All Stars: nominee 2005

Aidan Fennelly (born 28 August 1981) is a Gaelic footballer from County Laois.

He plays for the Portlaoise club. He usually plays at right corner back for Laois and in 2005 was nominated for an All-Star award. In 2003, he was part of the Laois team that won the Leinster Senior Football Championship title for the first time since 1946.

Fennelly emerged on to the scene in 1998 as part of the Laois minor team that retained the Leinster Minor Football Championship.

He was also on the Laois minor team in 1999 in both hurling and football, captaining the unsuccessful football team bidding for a fourth Leinster Minor Football Championship in a row.

Fennelly has also won eight Laois Senior Football Championship medals with his club Portlaoise.
