= Munster Ladies' Senior Club Football Championship =

Annual Gaelic football tournament winners

- Code: Ladies' Football
- Founded: 1977
- Title holders: Comeragh Rangers (Waterford) (1st title)
- Most titles: Ballymacarbry (Waterford) (16 titles)

The list of winners below is generated using the Roll of Honour from the Munster Ladies Gaelic Athletic Association club website. Munster clubs have the best record of all the provinces in the All Ireland Club Championship with 19 wins, spread across seven clubs, from three counties.

== Key ==
All-Ireland winners
All-Ireland finalists

== By year ==
Year	Venue	Winner	County	Runner-up	County
2025	Mallow	Comeragh Rangers 1-12	Waterford	Southern Gaels 0-11	Kerry
2024	Mallow	Castleisland Desmonds 3-08	Kerry	Comeragh Rangers 1-10	Waterford
2023	Mallow	Ballymacarbry 2-13	Waterford	The Banner 1-09	Clare
2022	Mallow	Ballymacarbry 0-08	Waterford	The Banner 0-05	Clare
2021	Mallow	Mourneabbey 4-10	Cork	Aherlow 0-08	Tipperary
2020	not completed due to Covid Pandemic				
2019	Cahir	Mourneabbey 2-18	Cork	Ballymacarbry 4-08	Waterford
2018	Cahir	Mourneabbey 1-16	Cork	Ballymacarbry 2-09	Waterford
2017	Carriganore	Mourneabbey 3-09	Cork	Ballymacarbry 0-11	Waterford
2016	Mallow	Mourneabbey 2-16	Cork	The Banner 1-06	Clare
2015	Mallow	Mourneabbey 3-19	Cork	Ballymacarbry 0-14	Waterford
2014	Killmallock	Mourneabbey 3-07	Cork	The Banner 2-08	Clare
2013	Killmallock	The Banner 1-13	Clare	St Vals 1-12	Cork
2012	Martinstown	Inch Rovers 2-13	Cork	The Banner 1-05	Clare
2011	Ballyagran	Donoughmore 4-09	Cork	Sliabh Luachra 0-07	Kerry
2010	Dungarvan	Inch Rovers 5-13	Cork	Ballymacarbry 2-10	Waterford
2010	Charleville	Inch Rovers 3-09	Cork	Ballymacarbry 2-12	Waterford
2009	Carrigadrohid	Donoughmore 1-16	Cork	Southern Gaels 0-11	Kerry
2008	Glanworth	Inch Rovers 2-14	Cork	Ballymacarbry 0-08	Waterford
2007	Fenagh	Inch Rovers	Cork	Southern Gaels	Kerry
2006	Midleton	Donoughmore 0-09	Cork	Ballymacarbry 0-04	Waterford
2005	Ardfinnan	Donoughmore 5-08	Cork	Ballymacarbry 1-08	Waterford
2004	Ballyduff	Donoughmore 3-17	Cork	Ballymacarbry 1-04	Waterford
2003	Ardfinnan	Donoughmore 3-15	Cork	Ballymacarbry 0-03	Waterford
2002	tbf	Donoughmore 3-07	Cork	Ballymacarbry 1-05	Waterford
2001	Ardfinnan	Donoughmore 2-08	Cork	Ballymacarbry 1-09	Waterford
2000	Glanworth	Ballymacarbry 6-12	Waterford	Donoughmore 3-12	Cork
1999	tbf	Ballymacarbry 4-18	Waterford	Donoughmore 2-01	Cork
1998	tbf	Ballymacarbry 1-31	Waterford	Donoughmore 3-09	Cork
1997	Ballyhooly	Ballymacarbry 2-13	Waterford	Donoughmore 0-09	Cork
1996	tbf	Cooraclare 4-10	Clare	Ballymacarbry 2-15	Waterford
1995	tbf	Ballymacarbry 3-29	Waterford	Glanworth 0-02	Cork
1994	tbf	Ballymacarbry 2-18	Waterford	Abbeydorney 0-03	Kerry
1993	Cratloe	Ballymacarbry 7-11	Waterford	Fergus Rovers 0-04	Clare
1992	Ballymacarbry	Ballymacarbry 3-14	Waterford	Glanworth 1-03	Cork
1991	tbf	Ballymacarbry	Waterford	Newmarket-on-Fergus	Clare
1990	tbf	Ballymacarbry 2-07	Waterford	Fergus Rovers 0-02	Clare
1989	Ballyporeen	Ballymacarbry 2-14	Waterford	Glanworth 0-04	Cork
1988	Bishopstown	Ballymacarbry 10-07	Waterford	Beaufort 3-03	Kerry
1987	Castletownroche	Ballymacarbry 3-07	Waterford	Castleisland 0-02	Kerry
1986	Macroom	Castleisland 1-07	Kerry	Ilen Rovers 0-03	Cork
1985	Rathcormac	Ballymacarbry 0-05	Waterford	Castleisland 0-01	Kerry
1984	Rathcormac	St Endas 2-4	Cork	Ballymacarbry 0-5	Waterford
1983	Ballyvourney	Castleisland 3-03	Kerry	St Endas 1-04	Cork
1982	Ballyclough	St Endas 1-06	Cork	Ballymacarbry 0-02	Waterford
1981	Kilbehenny	Watergrasshill 2-2	Cork	Slievenamon 1-2	Tipperary
1980	tbf	Castleisland	Kerry	Newtownshandrum	Cork
1979	Dromcollogher	Newtownshandrum 4-06	Cork	Austin Stacks 2-03	Kerry
1978	Newtownshandrum	Newtownshandrum 4-02	Cork	Castleisland 2-05	Kerry
1977	Newcastlewest	Loughmore 1-05	Tipperary	Austin Stacks 2-01	Kerry

== By Club ==
#	Club	County	Titles	Years won	Runners-up	Years runners-up
1	Ballymacarbry	Waterford	16	1985, 1987, 1988, 1989, 1990, 1991, 1992, 1993, 1994, 1995, 1997, 1998, 1999, 2000, 2022, 2023	15	1982, 1984, 1996, 2001, 2002, 2003, 2004, 2005, 2006, 2008, 2010, 2015, 2017, 2018, 2019
2	Donoughmore	Cork	8	2001, 2002, 2003, 2004, 2005, 2006, 2009, 2011	4	1997, 1998, 1999, 2000
3	Mourneabbey	Cork	7	2014, 2015, 2016, 2017, 2018, 2019, 2021	0	
4	Castleisland Desmonds	Kerry	4	1980, 1983, 1986, 2024	3	1978, 1985, 1987
5	Inch Rovers	Cork	4	2007, 2008, 2010, 2012	0	
6	St Endas	Cork	2	1982, 1984	1	1983
6	Newtownshandrum	Cork	2	1978, 1979	1	1980
8	The Banner	Clare	1	2013	5	2012, 2014, 2016, 2022, 2023
9	Comeragh Rangers	Waterford	1	2025	1	2024
10	Cooraclare	Clare	1	1995	0	
10	Watergrasshill	Cork	1	1981	0	
10	Loughmore	Tipperary	1	1977	0	
13	Southern Gaels	Kerry	0		3	2007, 2009, 2025
13	Glanworth	Cork	0		3	1989, 1992, 1995
15	Fergus Rovers	Clare	0		2	1990, 1993
15	Austin Stacks	Kerry	0		2	1977, 1979
17	Aherlow	Tipperary	0		1	2021
17	St Vals	Cork	0		1	2013
17	Sliabh Luachra	Kerry	0		1	2011
17	Abbeydorney	Kerry	0		1	1994
17	Newmarket-on-Fergus	Clare	0		1	1991
17	Beaufort	Kerry	0		1	1988
17	Ilen Rovers	Cork	0		1	1986
17	Slievenamon	Tipperary	0		1	1981

== By County ==
County	Winners	Clubs	First	Last	Finalists	Clubs	First	Last
Cork	24	6	1978	2021	11	6	1980	2013
Waterford	17	2	1985	2025	16	2	1982	2024
Kerry	4	1	1980	2024	11	5	1977	2025
Clare	2	2	1996	2013	8	3	1990	2023
Tipperary	1	1	1977		2	2	1981	2021
