= Kilkerrin–Clonberne GAA =

Gaelic games club in County Galway, Ireland

Kilkerrin–Clonberne
- Cill Choirín–Cluain Briorain
- Founded: 1888
- County: Galway
- Colours: Red and White
- Grounds: Father Stephen's Park
- Coordinates: 53°33′30.95″N 8°38′55.79″W

Playing kits
Standard colours

Senior Club Championships
	All Ireland	Connacht champions	Galway champions
Football:	0	0	0
Ladies' football:	4	9	13

Kilkerrin–Clonberne is a Gaelic Athletic Association club based in Clonberne, County Galway, Ireland. Its ladies' football team has won the All-Ireland club championship four times in a row.

== History ==
In his 'Annals of the GAA in Galway 1884-1901', Padraic O'Laoi notes that Clonberne - like Menlough - was initially a hurling club and was one of only 26 clubs in the county to play matches under GAA rules in 1885.

Kilkerrin–Clonberne won the Galway Junior A Football Championship in 1992.

The club achieved Senior status in 1996 and competed in the Galway Senior Club Football Championship up until 2015. The club was relegated to the Intermediate ranks by a strong Kilconly side.

The club reached the final of the Galway Intermediate Club Football Championship in both 2016 and 2020.

== Ladies' team ==
In 1999, the ladies' football club in Clonberne won an intermediate club All-Ireland. The club was runner-up in 2019 Senior All-Ireland Ladies' Club Football Championship.

The club has won four All-Ireland Ladies' Club Football Championships in a row, from 2021 to 2024.

== Notable players ==
- Martin Breheny — played for, and later served as secretary of, the club before he moved to Dublin in 1979
- John Divilly
- Shane Walsh
- Johnny Geraghty
- Christy Tyrrell

== Honours ==
- All-Ireland Senior Ladies' Club Football Championship: 2021, 2022, 2023, 2024; Runners-up: 2019
- Connacht Ladies' Senior Club Football Championship: 2014, 2015, 2018, 2019, 2020, 2021, 2022, 2023, 2024; Runners-up: 2000, 2013, 2017
- Galway Ladies’ Senior Club Football Championship: 2000, 2013, 2014, 2015, 2016, 2017, 2018, 2019, 2020, 2021, 2022, 2023, 2024
- All-Ireland Intermediate Ladies' Club Football Championship: 1999
- Galway Junior A Football Championship: 1992
- Connacht Ladies' Intermediate Club Football Championship: 1999
- All-Ireland Senior Ladies' Club 7s: 2022
