= Timahoe GAA =

GAA club in County Laois, Ireland

Timahoe
- Tigh Mochua
- County: Laois
- Grounds: Páirc Mochua, Timahoe
- Coordinates: 52°58′10″N 7°12′45″W

Playing kits
Standard colours

Senior Club Championships
	All Ireland	Leinster champions	Laois champions
Football:	-	-	1
Ladies' football:	1	3	12

Timahoe GAA is a Gaelic Athletic Association club in the village of Timahoe, County Laois, Ireland.

Club colours are red and white and the club grounds are called Páirc Mochua. It provided the venue for the 1984 All-Ireland Senior Ladies' Football Championship final, where Kerry defeated Leitrim.

Timahoe's only Laois Senior Football Championship title to date came in 1969 when Tom Joe Bradley captained the club to the county title.

Bobby Miller was probably one of Timahoe's greatest ever players while former Laois senior star Pauric Clancy was midfielder on the 2003 Laois team which won the Leinster Senior Football Championship.

Current and former Laois senior players Damien O'Connor, Brendan Quigley and Eoin Culliton all play for the club.

In 2008, Timahoe reached the final of the Laois Senior Football Championship only to lose to Portlaoise (their sixth senior final defeat) and in a major reversal of fortunes in 2009, Timahoe were relegated to the intermediate grade. Having returning to senior ranks in 2010, the club were again relegated at the end of the 2013 season .

Timahoe have previously won the Laois Intermediate Football Championship on four occasions, 1962, 2000, 2004 and 2010.

== Hurling ==
Hurling in the club takes place under the banner of the Park/Ratheniska-Timahoe club which was formed in late 2017 from the amalgamation of the hurling wings of the Timahoe and Park/Ratheniska clubs.Park/Ratheniska-Timahoe have won the Junior “A” grade in Laois twice in 2019 & 2023. Before the amalgamation of Park/Ratheniska-Timahoe Timahoe Gaa won the junior “A” hurling grade in Laois after a replay against Ballypickas Gaa in 2012.

== Achievements ==
- Laois Senior Football Championship: (1) 1969
- Laois Intermediate Football Championship (4) 1962, 2000, 2004, 2010

== Notable players ==
- Padraig Clancy
- Bobby Miller
- Brendan Quigley
- Sue Ramsbottom (ladies' football)
- Ruairí O'Connor
- Damien O'Connor, Laois vice-captain to Stephen Attride in 2019
- Eoin Culliton
