= Mick Haughney =

Irish Gaelic footballer

Personal information
- Native name: Mícheál Mac Fhachtna (Irish)
- Born: Laois, Ireland

Sport
- Sport: Gaelic football
- Position: Midfield/Forward
Club
- Years: Club
- ?: Graiguecullen
Club titles
- Laois titles: 10
- Leinster titles: ?
Inter-county
- Years: County
- 1930's-1940's: Laois
Inter-county titles
- Leinster titles: 4
- All Stars: 0

Mick Haughney was a Gaelic footballer from County Laois.

Nicknamed "Cutchie", Haughney was a native of the Carlow border town of Graiguecullen.

He played at corner forward when Laois won Leinster titles in 1936, 1937 and 1938, but captained the O’Moore County side from midfield to Leinster Senior Football Championship glory against Kildare in 1946.

Laois did not win the Leinster Senior Football Championship again until 2003 when Mick O'Dwyer led them to victory.

Haughney also won 10 Laois Senior Football Championship medals with Graiguecullen. He emigrated to the US in 1949 and returned to live in Ireland during the mid-1990s.

Haughney died in September 2006, aged 91.
