= Kilminchy GAA =

Former GAA club in County Laois, Ireland

Kilminchy
- Coill Mhinsin
- County: Laois
- Colours: Red and black

Playing kits
Standard colours

Kilminchy GAA was a Gaelic football club in the town of Portlaoise, County Laois, Ireland. The Kilminchy area now forms part of the catchment area of Portlaoise GAA club.

== History ==
In its earlier incarnation Kilminchy won the Laois Junior Football Championship in 1947 and the Laois Minor Football Championship in 1950.

The club was reformed in 2003 in an attempt to capitalise on the growing population in the eastern end of the town of Portlaoise. However, the club only lasted a few years before ceasing to field teams.
