= Timahoe =

Village in County Laois, Ireland

Timahoe Tigh Mochua
- Village
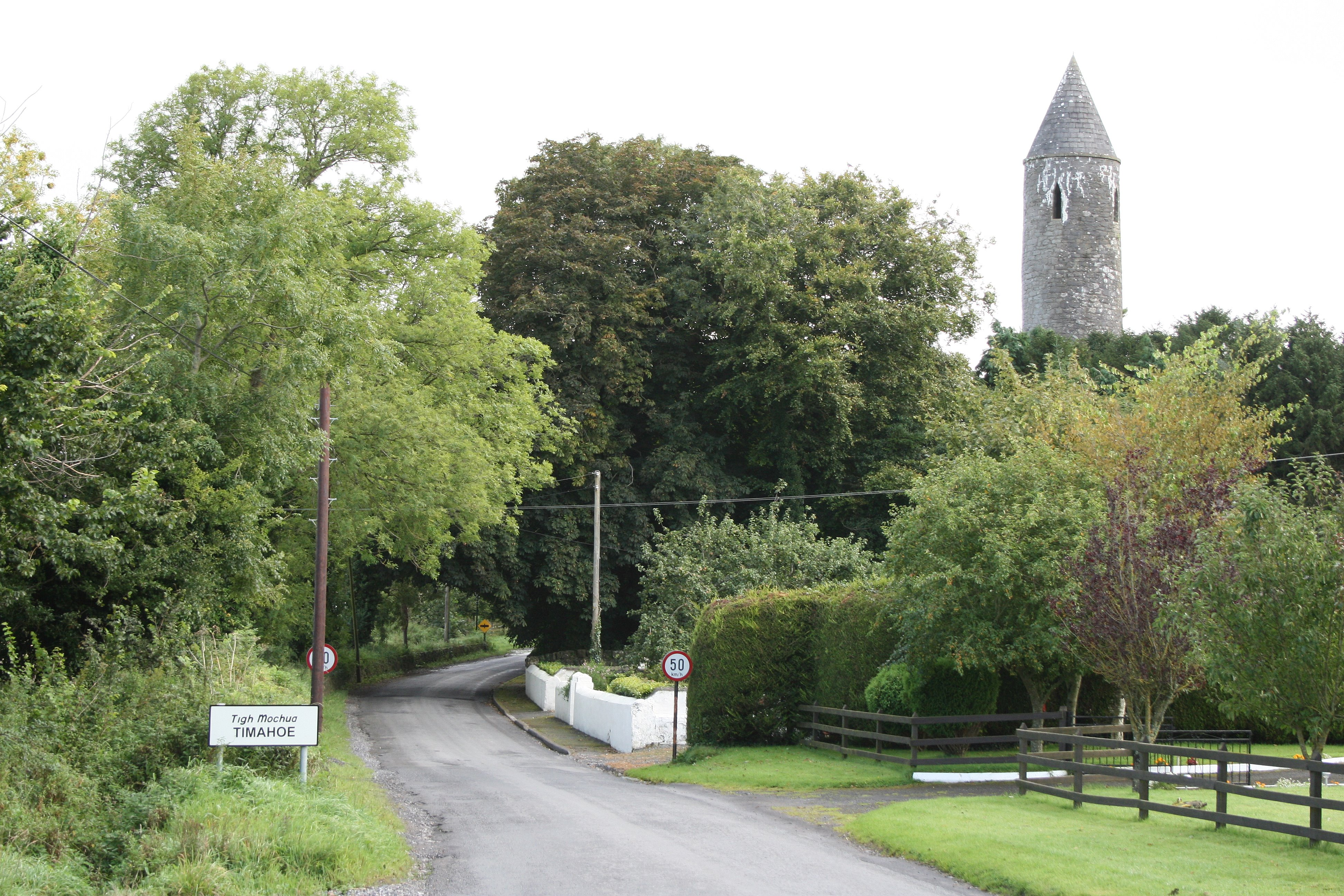
- Approaching Timahoe from the southwest

- Location in Ireland
- Coordinates: 52.961°N 7.202°W
- Country: Ireland
- Province: Leinster
- County: County Laois
- Elevation: 120 m (390 ft)

Population (2011)
  - Rural: 569
- Time zone: UTC+0 (WET)
  - Summer (DST): UTC-1 (IST (WEST))
- Irish Grid Reference: S534904

Timahoe (Irish: Tigh Mochua: 'House of Mochua') is a village in County Laois, Ireland, 12 kilometres (7 mi) south of Portlaoise on the R426 regional road.

The population of Timahoe in 2002 was 517, a 2.6% increase since 1996. It increased to 527 in 2006. The 2021 population was recorded as 569. The population over the years has only very slightly increased.

In 2008, a Timahoe Village Plan, to inform "any future developments which may occur within the development boundary of Timahoe", was drawn up to present to Laois County Council under the Laois County Development Plan 2006- 2012. This plan looked at aspects such as land use zoning, social infrastructure, community facilities and physical infrastructure. The objective of the plan was to provide a development plan for the village to service the area over a 6-year period and to enhance the character of the village.

== History ==
The village of Timahoe received its name from Saint Mochua who founded a monastery in the location which was also named after him - Teach Mo Chua. Timahoe was built as an estate town by the Cosby family of Stradbally Hall. Originally planned to be built in the form of six-sided star with the ruins and circular market house as the focal points, it was not realised in this manner.

== Church, castle and round tower ==
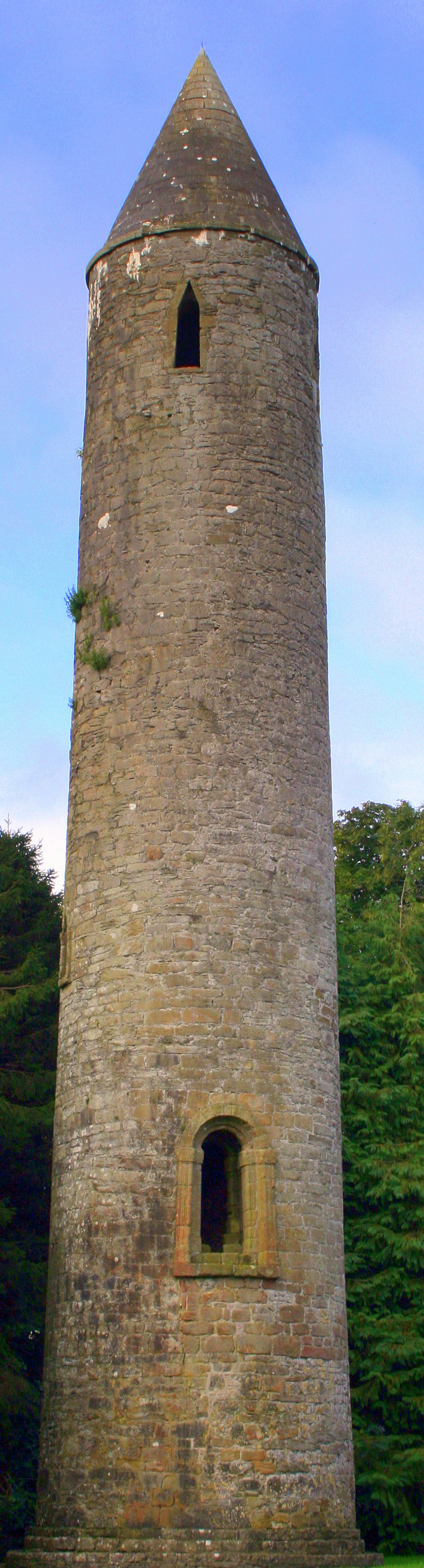
Timahoe round tower

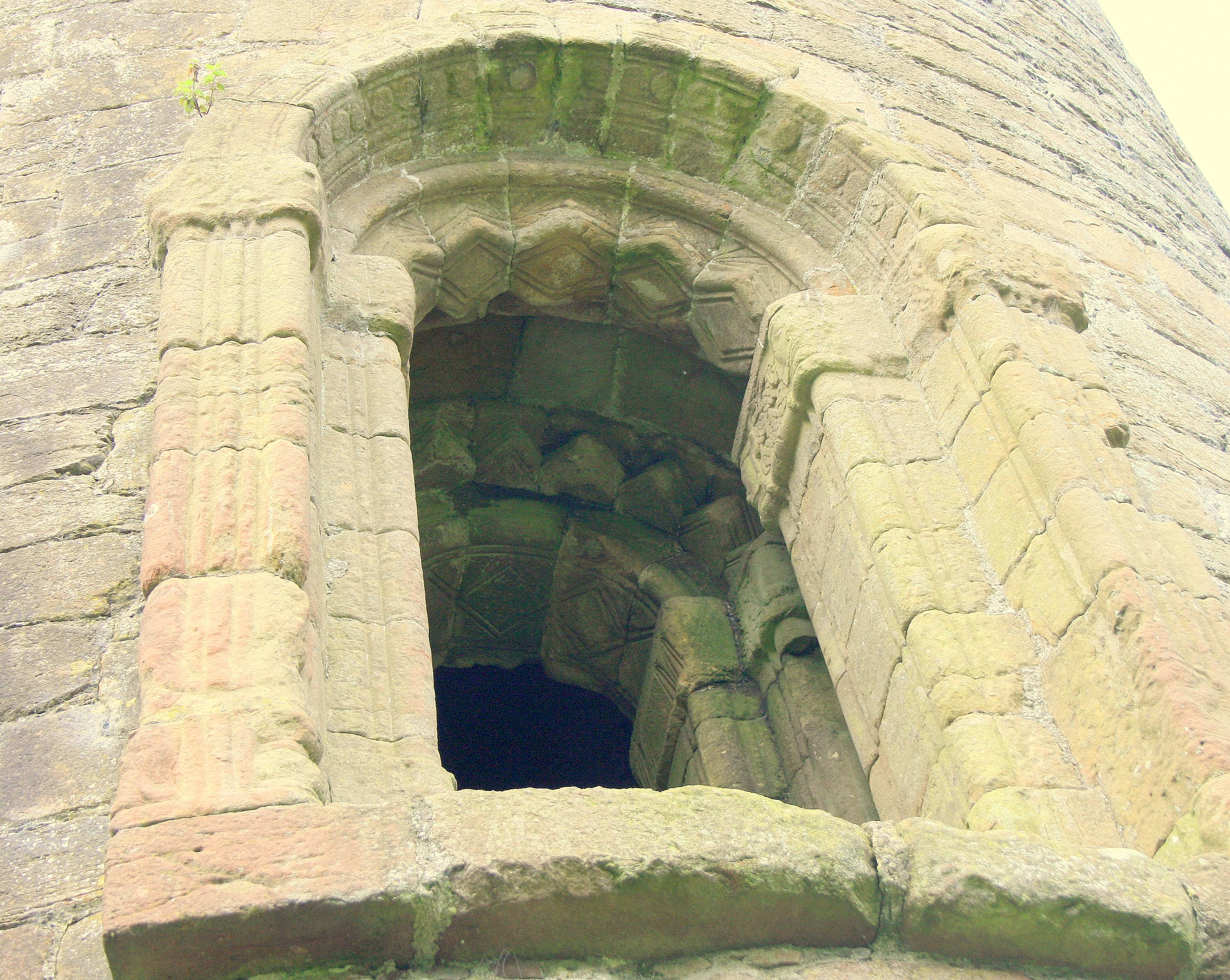
Door of 12th-century Round Tower

Saint Mochua established a monastery here in the 7th century. There are some early historical references to the site – a church was burned here in 919, while there was a murder in the doorway of another church in 1019. It was burned in 1142, and refounded by the O'Mores of the Rock of Dunmase. There was a monastic community here as late as 1650.

The present fragmentary church has an inserted 15th-century chancel arch – now blocked up – leading to the site of the altar. The church resembled a sizeable rectangular building with a door facing west and a window to the east. Both cannot be identified in present day as only remains of the church are left.

The Round Tower was built in the mid-12th century and is one of the finest in Ireland. Standing 30m high, it is near the centre of the village. The cap was rebuilt in the 19th century, but the tower is otherwise in its original condition. The round tower is one of the best surviving of its kind in Ireland. It is made of both limestone and sandstone rock. Its doorway, which is high off the ground and faced the doorway of the church, is elaborately decorated in the Romanesque style. The bottom of the doorway on the exterior of the tower has a step which leads to an inner doorway. The inner arch of the door is carved with a chevron pattern. It has four orders (rows of decoration receding into the doorway), two inside and two outside, separated by a narrow vaulted lobby. The capitals – the heads of the pillars of the doorway – are carved with human heads with intertwining hair. Similar carvings can be found further south in Laois at the 12th century Killeshin Church.

== Timahoe esker ==
Timahoe contains an esker which is owned by the state and is a National Nature Reserve. The esker has been identified as the best example of an esker a woodland area in County Laois that is still intact. The Timahoe esker is steep and high and many parts of the esker are not obvious but most are somewhat visible. The flora of the ash woodland contains pedalculate oak and grey willow along with hazel and hawthorn. It is also rich in bluebells, bugle and shield fern during their seasonal time.

The Timahoe Esker has a high biodiversity value as a result of it having a large area of intact woodland. It is both a Nature Reserve and a Natural Heritage area so, therefore, its potential for biodiversity management is particularly greater.

== Education ==
Timahoe contains a co-educational Catholic national school named Scoil Mhuire Fatima under the bishop of the Kildare and Leighlin diocese.

== Sport ==
Timahoe GAA is the local Gaelic Athletic Association club. There are currently two Timahoe players on the current Laois senior football panel. These include Damien O' Connor and Brendan Quigley. Timahoe also has a soccer club called T&S United which is conjunction with its neighbouring village Stradbally. The ladies football club in Timahoe is named as Timahoe Ladies which is in conjunction with neighbouring parishes Stradbally and Vicarstown.
