= Padraig Clancy =

Irish Gaelic footballer

Pádraig Clancy
Personal information
- Native name: Pádraig Mac Fhlannchaidh (Irish)
- Born: 1980 (age 45–46) Portlaoise, Republic of Ireland
- Height: 1.93 m (6 ft 4 in)

Sport
- Sport: Gaelic Football
- Position: Midfield
Club
- Years: Club
- 1997-: Timahoe
Club titles
- Laois titles: 3
Inter-county
- Years: County
- 1999–2013: Laois
Inter-county titles
- Leinster titles: 1

Pádraig Clancy is a Gaelic footballer from County Laois.

== Playing career ==
Clancy plays with his local club Timahoe and won three Laois Intermediate Football Championships, in 2000, 2004 and 2010.

Clancy usually played at midfield for his county. He emerged onto the scene in 1998 as part of the Laois minor team that retained the Leinster Minor Football Championship title before going on to lose the All-Ireland Minor Football Championship final to Tyrone. In 2003, he was part of the Laois team that won the Leinster Senior Football Championship title for the first time since 1946. He announced his retirement from inter-county football in 2013.

In 2005, he won an Interprovincial Championship medal with his province Leinster.

== Honours ==
- 1 Leinster Senior Football Championship (2003)
- 1 Leinster Minor Football Championship (1998)
- 1 Railway Cup (2005)
- 3 Laois Intermediate Football Championship (2000, 2004, 2010)
