= Brian McDonald (Laois Gaelic footballer) =

Laois Gaelic footballer

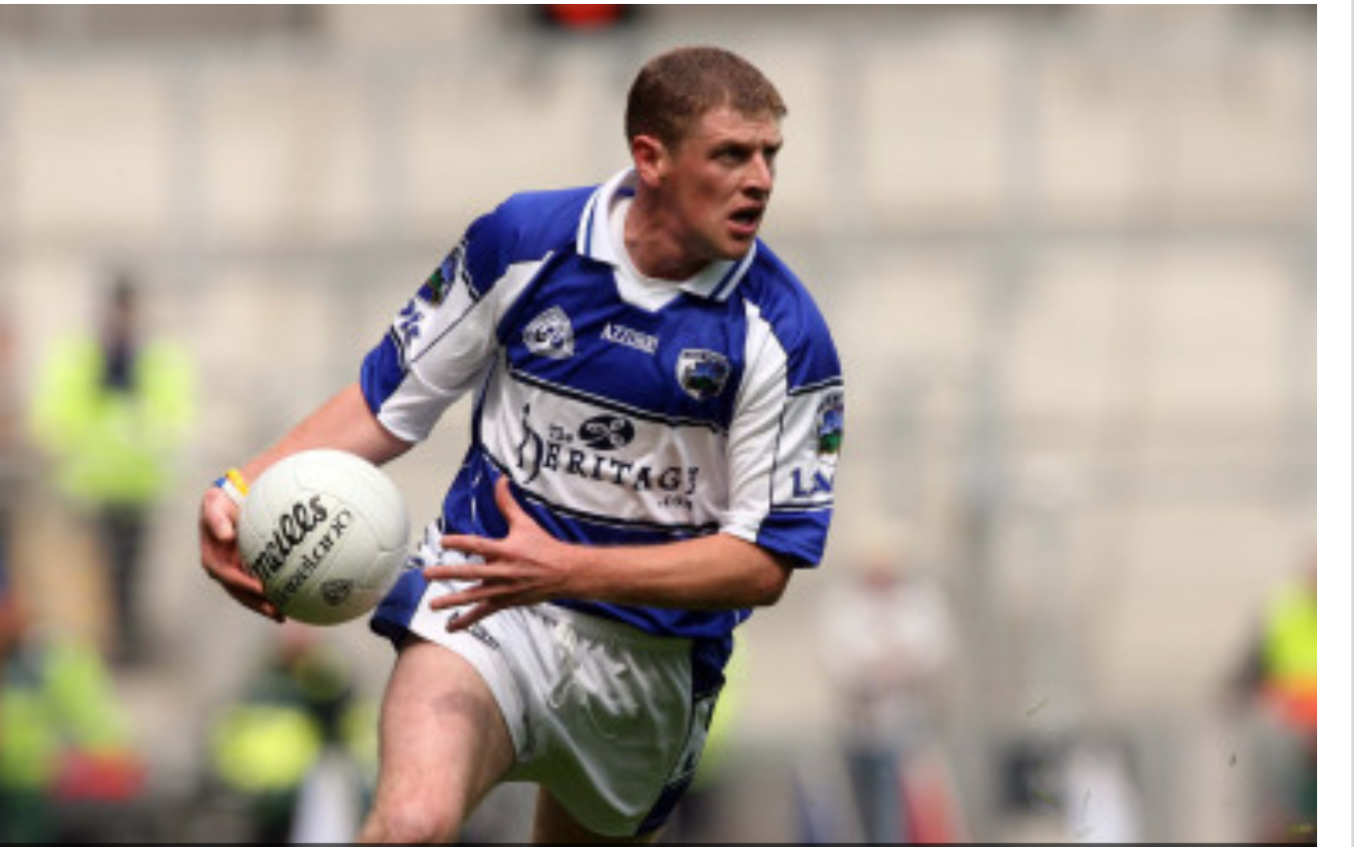

Personal information
- Native name: Brian Mac Dónaill (Irish)
- Nickname: Beano
- Born: 7 June 1980 (age 46) County Laois
- Occupation: Agricultural Farmer

Sport
- Sport: Gaelic football
- Position: Corner forward
Club
- Years: Club
- Arles–Killeen
Inter-county
- Years: County
- 1998-2009: Laois
Inter-county titles
- Leinster titles: 5

Brian "Beano" McDonald (born 7 June 1980) is a Gaelic footballer and former player for Laois. He resides in Killeen, County Laois, his club is Arles–Killeen.

Known as "Beano", McDonald was one of the top scorers in 2003 All-Ireland Senior Football Championship. He represented Ireland in the 2003 International Rules Series. He scored both goals and overs to win against Australia but Ireland ultimately lost the Series that year.

In 2021 Billy Sheehan chose him as a Laois senior football selector.

== Career ==
Before reaching the age of 12, McDonald had won 5 county medals, playing for his club St Michael's (Arles–Killeen) and national school St Abban's N. S., following his progression to Knockbeg College his football career equally progressed, playing in both schools, club and county championships.

By 17, McDonald was lining out for Club and County, winning two All Ireland Football Championship Minor titles, three minor Leinster Championship titles and making his senior championship debut while still playing minor in 1998. McDonald lined out for Laois Under 21's bringing them all the way to an All Ireland under 21's final against Kerry and later in the same year, lining out for Laois Minors against Tyrone in the All Ireland Minor championship final.

In 2003, Under the leadership of Kerry GAA legend Mick O'Dwyer McDonald enjoyed success again with his native Laois winning the Leinster senior football championship against Kildare scoring 1–2.

McDonald is one of the few players to obtain 3 All Ireland minor medals in 1996, 1997 and 1998 for his native county Laois. He was shortlisted for a Vodafone All Star award in 2003. He also joined the Laois backroom team as a coach (alongside Chris Conway) under Billy Sheehan, who was appointed manager in October 2021.

== Honours ==
Club

- 3 Laois Intermediate Football Championship
- 1 Dublin Senior Football Championship
- Laois Senior Football Championship final 2006

College

While attending University College Dublin, he played for UCD in the 2001 Sigerson Cup championship, losing the final to Ulster University.

Inter-county

- 1 Leinster Senior Football Championship 2003
- 1 Leinster Under-21 Football Championship 1998
- 3 Leinster Minor Football Championship 1996, 1997, 1998
- 2 All-Ireland Minor Football Championship 1996, 1997
- All-Ireland Minor Football Championship final 1998
