= Graiguecullen GAA =

Gaelic sports club of County Laois, Ireland

Graiguecullen
- Graig Chuillin
- Founded: 1898
- County: Laois
- Nickname: Graigue
- Colours: Green and red
- Grounds: Fr. Maher Park
- Coordinates: 52°50′30.71″N 6°56′31.84″W

Playing kits
Standard colours

Graiguecullen GFC are a Gaelic Athletic Association club from County Laois, Ireland. The club played in Carlow for many years but in 1926 they were suspended. The club then chose to play in Laois and have been doing so ever since.

The club were winners of thirteen Carlow Senior Football Championship titles (the last of which was in 1925) and twelve Laois Senior Football Championship titles, the last of which was in 1965.

The club won the Laois Intermediate Football Championship in 2007 in their first attempt to bounce straight back up to senior football, after being relegated for the first time in the club's history in 2006.

The club have produced a number of Laois inter-county football players, including Tommy Murphy, Mick Haughney and Mark Timmons.

== History ==
Founded in 1898, the club colours are green with a red hoop and white shorts. The club originally competed in the Carlow championships before being expelled in 1926 following an incident in the County Final against Milford in Rathoe. In 1927, they were invited to join the Laois Championship and they have remained there ever since.

During their time in Carlow GAA the club were extremely successful, winning 13 Carlow Senior Football Championship titles before returning to compete in the Laois championships in 1927.

The club grounds, Fr. Maher Park, are in County Laois, but on the County Carlow border on the outskirts of Carlow town.

== Achievements ==
- Carlow Senior Football Championship: (13) 1908. 1909, 1910, 1912, 1913, 1914, 1915, 1918, 1921, 1922, 1923, 1924, 1925
- Laois Senior Football Championship: (13) 1927, 1931, 1934, 1935, 1938, 1939, 1942, 1944, 1945, 1946, 1947, 1949, 1965
- Laois Intermediate Football Championship: (1) 2007
- Laois Junior Football Championships: (4) 1936, 1955, 1975, 2012
- Laois Junior B Football Championship: (3) 1985, 2011, 2014
- Laois Junior C Football Championship: (2) 2013, 2019

Junior C Hurling championship 1993

- Laois Under 21 Football Championship: (3) 1985, 1987, 2010 (1985 and 1987 titles as St Fiach's, an amalgamation with Killeshin)
- Laois Minor Football Championship: (12) 1933, 1939, 1941, 1945, 1946, 1947, 1948, 1949, 1992, 2010, 2015, 2021
- Laois Minor B Football Championship: (2) 2001, 2018
- Laois All-County Football League Div. 1: (2) 1975, 2013
- Laois All-County Football League Div. 2: (1) 2006
- Laois All-County Football League Div. 3: (1) 2017
- Laois All-County Football League Div. 4: (2) 2009, 2024
- Laois All-County Football League Div. 5: (1) 2018
