= Crettyard GAA =

GAA club in Crettyard, County Laois, Ireland

Crettyard
- Crochta Ard
- Founded: 1960
- County: Laois
- Nickname: Cretty
- Colours: Green, white and gold
- Coordinates: 52°51′56.51″N 7°06′18.48″W

Playing kits
Standard colours

Crettyard GAA is a Gaelic Athletic Association gaelic football club in Crettyard near Newtown in County Laois, Ireland.

The club is located near the Laois-Kilkenny border.

== History ==
Shortly after the GAA was founded in 1884, there were two clubs in the area: Mayo "Die Hards" and Newtown "sons of Erin". According to The Nationalist and Leinster Times, Newtown played a football game against Modubeagh in 1888, Mayo also played a match against Modubeagh in the Arles club tournament in 1889. An R.I.C. special branch report on the G.A.A. in Queens County in 1890, stated that the Mayo and Newtown clubs were both affiliated. The Mayo club officers were, Captain; John Doogue, Sec; James Murphy, Treas; John Graham. There were 40 members in the club. The Newtown club officers were Captain: Luke Delaney; Sec: John Dooley; Treasurer: William Delaney, Newtown had 55 members. The draw for the football championship of 1891 had Newtown v Drimroe down to play in Kellyville on 19 April 1891 with James Mallon as referee. The last report of a team from the Parish during this time came in 1896, Newtown playing Athy in the Ballyadams club tournament.

Martin Gorman and Paddy Lawlor were both from Doonane and played with Clough/Cloneen club in the Kilkenny county finals of 1911–1913. Paddy Lawlor represented the Kilkenny Senior football team during this time. Kilkenny was very successful in football during the early 1900s.

There is a report in the Nationalist newspaper of a meeting of the Doonane/Mayo branch of the Irish National Volunteers in the "football field" in Killeen, Crettyard in 1914 therefore, it can be assumed that football was played in the Parish even though no team was affiliated at this time.

Newtown reappeared in the 1930 Junior Championship. After reaching the semi-final in 1931, v Portarlington, match played on 17 January 1932, they dropped out of existence. The team mentors was Tom Purcell from Clonbrock and Pat Reilly of Newtown Bog. "Big" Paddy Delaney, Michael "Skealy" Delaney both from Crettyard, Andy Nash Aughrina and John Reilly Newtown Bog all played and won Kilkenny county titles with Cloneen club during this period.

The "Old" Crettyard club was founded in 1936. Playing in the junior championship, they reached six semi-finals over 11 years. They were unlucky not to have won at least one Laois title and were generally regarded as one of the best junior teams of their time. The club supplied players to Laois senior, junior and minor teams. The club's last match was in the losing the 1947 semi-final v Kilminchy, which was played in 1948.

The Fairymount club was founded in 1948. Starting out as a minor club, a junior team was formed in 1950. After a long hard campaign, the 1952 junior championship was won, defeating Jamestown after a replay. Fairymount campaign for the next 7 years in the intermediate grade without success, although they reached the 1959 final, losing to Stradbally. The club also reached the 1957 Minor final, Annanough winning by a point after a great match. Players from Fairymount club also represented Laois in all grades during the 1950s.

Fairymount Camogie club was started in 1951. A second football club, Tolerton, was formed in 1956. The present Crettyard club was founded in 1960, with the amalgamation of the Fairymount and Tolerton clubs.

The new club got off to a great start, winning the 1961 Junior and the 1965 Intermediate championships. They also reached the 1962 Minor and 1964 Intermediate finals. A little piece of history was made, when eight players from the club represented Laois in the Leinster Junior Championship of 1965. Six played on the team that reached the Leinster final. The players were James Hosey, Jimmy Murphy, Michael Warren, Frankie Dormer, Ned Daly, Paddy Brennan, Luke Whelan and Micky Brennan. The club competed in Senior ranks for the first time in 1966. For the next couple of years, the club competed very strongly, but without success.

The club were relegated to Intermediate in 1972, but returned to senior ranks in 1976 when they won the intermediate title beating the Heath in the final. From 1976 to 1984, the club didn't enjoy any success being relegated in 1979. In 1984 they again won the Intermediate title beating The Rock in the final. The club maintained senior status for 19 years with varying success, winning Division 1 League titles in 1997 and 1998. Also in 1994 the club achieved county honours when the U21s took the title beating Portarlington in the Final.

2005 turned out to be a great year for Crettyard. The club won the Intermediate county title, beating Courtwood in a closely contested final before progressing to win the Leinster Intermediate Club Football Championship Title, beating Rathcline of Longford. In the last number of years the club has regularly reached the quarter finals of the Senior Championship.

St Abbans Hurling club was founded in 1960; they played junior and minor hurling for a couple of years. They maintained a juvenile club for six years.

St Abbans camogie club was formed in 1961. Their mentors were Mick Dormer and Paddy Sixsmith. Eileen Dormer played on the Laois camogie team during the 60s. Due to emigration and lack of players, the club folded after a couple of seasons.

Crettyard Ladies football club was formed in 1974. They have won county championships in all grades and have also achieved success at Leinster championship level. They have supplied numerous players to the Laois Ladies county teams for many years, helping the county to win All-Ireland titles at minor and senior Level. The club has several All Star winners in their ranks, such as Connie Conway, with volunteers recognised with awards at national level, such as Mary Wheatley.

The St Brigid's handball club was founded in 1984. The club has been very successful over the last 25 years, producing Leinster and All-Ireland champions at juvenile and adult level in both male and female competitions.

In the 1980s, the Crettyard football club purchased their own grounds at Moscow, Newtown. County teams have used the facilities for training and matches. The Club have a clubhouse, stand, gym, two full sized playing pitches, floodlights to inter-county standard and parking for over 500 vehicles

== Honours ==
=== Fairymount ===
1 Junior Title, 1952

=== Crettyard ===
- Leinster Intermediate Club Football Championship 2005,
- Laois Intermediate Football Championship (4) 1965, 1976, 1984, 2005,2024
- Laois Under-21 Football Championship (1) 1994
- Laois Junior Football Championships (1) 1961
- Laois Junior B Football Championship (2) 1993, 2001

Laois Minor A Football Championship (1) 2025

- Laois Minor B Football Championship (2) 1991, 1998
- Laois All-County Football League Division 1: (2) 1997, 1998
- Laois All-County Football League Division 2: (3) 1980, 2003, 2007
- Laois Under-21 Football Championship (2) 1985, 1987
- Laois Minor Football Championship (2) 2000, 2001
