= 2016 National Football League (Ireland) =

Gaelic football competition

League details
- Dates: 30 January – 24 April 2016
- Teams: 32

League champions
- Winners: Dublin (12th win)
- Captain: Stephen Cluxton
- Manager: Jim Gavin

League runners-up
- Runners-up: Kerry
- Captain: Bryan Sheehan
- Manager: Éamonn Fitzmaurice

Other division winners
- Division 2: Tyrone
- Division 3: Clare
- Division 4: Louth

The 2016 National Football League, known for sponsorship reasons as the Allianz National Football League, was the 85th staging of the National Football League (NFL), an annual Gaelic football tournament for the Gaelic Athletic Association county teams. Thirty-one Gaelic football county teams from the island of Ireland, plus London, competed. Kilkenny did not participate.

Setanta and TG4 provided live coverage of the league on Saturday nights and Sunday afternoons, respectively. RTÉ Two broadcast a highlights programme, League Sunday, on Sunday evenings.

Dublin won their 12th title in total and their 4th in a row, defeating Kerry in the final on a score of 2–18 to 0–13.

== Format ==
=== League structure ===
The 2016 National Football League consisted of four divisions of eight teams. Each team played every other team in its division once, usually four home and three away or three home and four away. Two points were awarded for a win and 1 for a draw.

=== Tie-breaker ===
If only two teams were level on league points:

- The team that won the head-to-head match was ranked first;
- If this game was a draw, score difference (total scored minus total conceded in all games) was used to rank the teams;
- If score difference was identical, total scored was used to rank the teams;
- If still identical, a play-off was required.

If three or more teams were level on points, score difference was used to rank the teams.

=== Finals, promotions and relegations ===
Division 1

The top four teams in Division 1 contest the National Football League semi-finals (first plays fourth and second plays third) with the winners progressing to the final. The bottom 2 teams are relegated to Division 2.

Division 2, Division 3 & Division 4

The top two teams in Divisions 2, 3 and 4 are promoted and contest the finals of their respective divisions. The bottom two teams in Divisions 2 and 3 are relegated.

== Division 1 ==
=== Table ===
Compete in Division 1 semi-finals
Automatic relegation to Division 2

Team	Pld	W	D	L	F	A	Diff	Pts
Dublin	7	7	0	0	8-91	4-75	28	14
Kerry	7	5	0	2	5-109	5-77	32	10
Roscommon	7	4	0	3	9-98	8-77	24	8
Donegal	7	3	0	4	8-84	6-78	12	6
Mayo	7	3	0	4	5-88	7-91	-9	6
Monaghan	7	3	0	4	6-83	7-91	-11	6
Cork	7	3	0	4	9-89	9-105	-16	6
Down	7	0	0	7	2-60	6-108	-60	0

^{1}Donegal, Mayo, Monaghan and Cork are ranked by scoring difference.

=== Rounds 1 to 7 ===
30/01/16; Round 1	Down	0–7 – 3–15	Donegal	Páirc Esler, Newry; Referee: D Gough
30/01/16; Round 1	D O'Hare (0–4), A McConville (0–2), C McGovern (0–1)	Report	M Murphy (0–8), P McBrearty (1–3), R McHugh (2–0), L McLoone (0–2), C Thompson (0–1), F McGlynn (0–1)	Páirc Esler, Newry; Referee: D Gough

30/01/16; Round 1	Dublin	2–14 – 0–14	Kerry	Croke Park, Dublin; Attendance: 30,107; Referee: E Kinsella; Man of the Match: Paddy Andrews
30/01/16; Round 1	D Rock (0–7), P Andrews (1–4), D Connolly (1–0), C Costello (0–1), P Mannion (0–1), T Brady (0–1)	Report	BJ Keane (0–4), D O'Sullivan (0–3), D Moran (0–2), B O'Sullivan (0–1), D Walsh (0–1), J Buckley (0–1), S O'Brien (0–1), T Walsh (0–1)	Croke Park, Dublin; Attendance: 30,107; Referee: E Kinsella; Man of the Match: Paddy Andrews

31/01/16; Round 1	Cork	1–18 – 0–12	Mayo	Páirc Uí Rinn, Cork; Attendance: 4,849; Referee: M Deegan
31/01/16; Round 1	B Hurley (1–4), D Goulding (0–5), P Kerrigan (0–3), B O'Driscoll (0–2), L Connolly (0–2), I Maguire (0–1), T Clancy (0–1)	Report	C O'Shea (0–3), E Regan (0–2), J Doherty (0–2), M Sweeney (0–2), T Parsons (0–2), L Keegan (0–1)	Páirc Uí Rinn, Cork; Attendance: 4,849; Referee: M Deegan

31/01/16; Round 1	Roscommon	1–9 – 2–10	Monaghan	Dr. Hyde Park, Roscommon; Attendance: 2,900; Referee: C Lane
31/01/16; Round 1	F Cregg (0–5), C Murtagh (1–2), E Smith (0–1), S Kilbride (0–1)	Report	C McManus (1–2), D Malone (1–1), D McKenna (0–2), R Beggan (0–2), T Kerr (0–2), N McAdam (0–1)	Dr. Hyde Park, Roscommon; Attendance: 2,900; Referee: C Lane

06/02/16; Round 2	Mayo	0–7 – 0–09	Dublin	MacHale Park, Castlebar; Attendance: 10,520; Referee: P Hughes
06/02/16; Round 2	E Regan (0–3), D O'Connor (0–2), R Hennelly (0–2)	Report	D Rock (0–4), C Costello (0–1), D Bastick (0–1), D Connolly (0–1), E O Conghaile (0–1), J McCarthy (0–1)	MacHale Park, Castlebar; Attendance: 10,520; Referee: P Hughes

07/02/16; Round 2	Donegal	2–14 – 1–7	Cork	Fr Tierney Park, Ballyshannon; Referee: J McQuillan
07/02/16; Round 2	O MacNiallais (1–4), P McBrearty (0–4), M O'Reilly (1–1), A Thompson (0–2), C Thompson (0–1), F McGlynn (0–1), M Murphy (0–1)	Report	D Goulding (0–5), D Og Hodnett (1–0), B O'Driscoll (0–1)	Fr Tierney Park, Ballyshannon; Referee: J McQuillan

07/02/16; Round 2	Kerry	1–10 – 0–14	Roscommon	Fitzgerald Stadium, Killarney; Referee: F Kelly
07/02/16; Round 2	BJ Keane (0–5), S O'Brien (1–1), J Buckley (0–2), C Cox (0–1), T Walsh (0–1)	Report	C Cregg (0–4), E Smith (0–3), C Devanney (0–2), C Murtagh (0–2), F Cregg (0–2), C Connolly (0–1)	Fitzgerald Stadium, Killarney; Referee: F Kelly

07/02/16; Round 2	Monaghan	0–13 – 0–11	Down	St Tiernach's Park, Clones; Referee: C Reilly
07/02/16; Round 2	C McManus (0–2), O Duffy (0–2), R McAnespie (0–2), S Carey (0–2), D Malone (0–1), D McKenna (0–1), F Kelly (0–1), R Beggan (0–1), T Kerr (0–1)	Report	C Harrison (0–4), D O'Hanlon (0–3), S McArdle (0–2), M McKay (0–1), P Downey (0–1)	St Tiernach's Park, Clones; Referee: C Reilly

27/02/16; Round 3	Dublin	1–14 – 0–16	Monaghan	Croke Park, Dublin; Attendance: 17,080; Referee: P Hughes
27/02/16; Round 3	D Rock (0–7), D Connolly (1–0), C Costello (0–2), P McMahon (0–2), B Brogan (0–1), E O Conghaile (0–1), P Flynn (0–1)	Report	C McManus (0–12), D Hughes (0–1), K Duffy (0–1), K Hughes (0–1), O Duffy (0–1)	Croke Park, Dublin; Attendance: 17,080; Referee: P Hughes

28/02/16; Round 3	Cork	3–10 – 4–25	Roscommon	Páirc Uí Rinn, Cork; Referee: D Coldrick
28/02/16; Round 3	L Connolly (1–3), P Kelleher (2–0), D Goulding (0–4), B Hurley (0–1), C O'Neill (0–1), P Kerrigan (0–1)	Report	C Murtagh (2–3), F Cregg (0–5), C Cregg (1–2), C Devaney (0–4), S Kilbride (1–1), C Connolly (0–3), E Smith (0–2), C Shine (0–1), D Murray (0–1), I Kilbride (0–1), N Collins (0–1), N Daly (0–1)	Páirc Uí Rinn, Cork; Referee: D Coldrick

28/02/16; Round 3	Donegal	1–14 – 1–12	Mayo	MacCumhail Park, Ballybofey; Referee: B Cassidy
28/02/16; Round 3	M Murphy (0–5), P McBrearty (0–4), L McLoone (1–0), O MacNiallais (0–2), R McHugh (0–2), R Kavanagh (0–1)	Report	E Regan (0–4), D O'Connor (1–0), R Hennelly (0–2), A O'Shea (0–1), B Harrison (0–1), C Loftus (0–1), L Keegan (0–1), S Nally (0–1), S O'Shea (0–1)	MacCumhail Park, Ballybofey; Referee: B Cassidy

28/02/16; Round 3	Down	0–6 – 0–22	Kerry	Páirc Esler, Newry; Referee: M Duffy
28/02/16; Round 3	B O'Hagan (0–2), C Harrison (0–2), C Maginn (0–1), R Mallon (0–1)	Report	B Sheehan (0–6), D O'Sullivan (0–4), A Fitzgerald (0–3), BJ Keane (0–3), C Cooper (0–3), B O'Sullivan (0–2), S O'Brien (0–1)	Páirc Esler, Newry; Referee: M Duffy

05/03/16; Round 4	Dublin	2–14 – 2–10	Cork	Croke Park, Dublin; Attendance: 20,280; Referee: P Neilan; Man of the Match: Diarmuid Connolly
05/03/16; Round 4	C Costello (0–9), D Connolly (1–3), J McCarthy (1–0), P Andrews (0–2)	Report	C O'Neill (1–3), P Kelleher (1–0), B Hurley (0–2), C O'Driscoll (0–1), L Connolly (0–1), M Collins (0–1), P Kerrigan (0–1), R Deane (0–1)	Croke Park, Dublin; Attendance: 20,280; Referee: P Neilan; Man of the Match: Diarmuid Connolly

06/03/16; Round 4	Roscommon	1–12 – 0–6	Down	Pearse Park, Longford; Referee: B Cassidy
06/03/16; Round 4	C Murtagh (1–6), F Cregg (0–3), C Daly (0–2), C Cregg (0–1)	Report	C Harrison (0–2), B O'Hagan (0–1), D O'Hanlon (0–1), M Poland (0–1), P Devlin (0–1)	Pearse Park, Longford; Referee: B Cassidy

06/03/16; Round 4	Kerry	1–13 – 1–8	Donegal	Austin Stack Park, Tralee; Attendance: 7,056; Referee: E Kinsella
06/03/16; Round 4	B Sheehan (0–8), D Walsh (0–3), P Crowley (1–0), BJ Keane (0–1), C Cooper (0–1)	Report	M Murphy (1–4), P McBrearty (0–3), N Gallagher (0–1)	Austin Stack Park, Tralee; Attendance: 7,056; Referee: E Kinsella

06/03/16; Round 4	Monaghan	1–12 – 2–11	Mayo	St Mary's Park, Castleblayney; Referee: J McQuillan
06/03/16; Round 4	C McManus (1–8), F Kelly (0–1), R Beggan (0–1), S Carey (0–1), T Kerr (0–1)	Report	D O'Connor (1–1), E Regan (0–3), C Loftus (1–0), C O'Shea (0–2), K McLoughlin (0–2), R Hennelly (0–2), J Doherty (0–1)	St Mary's Park, Castleblayney; Referee: J McQuillan

12/03/16; Round 5	Down	1–7 – 1–15	Dublin	Páirc Esler, Newry; Referee: D O'Mahoney; Man of the Match: Cormac Costello
12/03/16; Round 5	D O'Hare (1–2), J Murphy (0–2), D O'Hanlon (0–1), M McKay (0–1), P Devlin (0–1)	Report	C Costello (1–4), D Rock (0–3), C Kilkenny (0–2), K McManamon (0–2), P Flynn (0–2), J Cooper (0–1), P Andrews (0–1)	Páirc Esler, Newry; Referee: D O'Mahoney; Man of the Match: Cormac Costello

13/03/16; Round 5	Cork	1–20 – 1–13	Monaghan	Páirc Uí Rinn, Cork; Referee: P O'Sullivan
13/03/16; Round 5	C O'Neill (1–8), B O'Driscoll (0–2), M Collins (0–2), C O'Driscoll (0–1), D Goulding (0–1), D MacEoin (0–1), K Crowley (0–1), K O'Driscoll (0–1), L Connolly (0–1), P Kelleher (0–1), P Kerrigan (0–1)	Report	C McManus (0–8), C McCarthy (1–0), D Hughes (0–2), R Beggan (0–2), R McAnespie (0–1)	Páirc Uí Rinn, Cork; Referee: P O'Sullivan

13/03/16; Round 5	Mayo	0–14 – 2–13	Kerry	MacHale Park, Castlebar; Referee: R Hickey
13/03/16; Round 5	K McLoughlin (0–3), A Moran (0–2), A O'Shea (0–2), J Doherty (0–2), R Hennelly (0–2), D O'Connor (0–1), S Nally (0–1), T Parsons (0–1)	Report	J Buckley (1–1), D Walsh (1–0), B O'Sullivan (0–2), B Sheehan (0–2), C Cooper (0–2), D O'Sullivan (0–2), P Crowley (0–2), BJ Keane (0–1), M O Se (0–1)	MacHale Park, Castlebar; Referee: R Hickey

13/03/16; Round 5	Donegal	0–17 – 1–19	Roscommon	O'Donnell Park, Letterkenny; Referee: P Hughes
13/03/16; Round 5	M Murphy (0–7), P McBrearty (0–6), C Toye (0–1), E McHugh (0–1), O MacNiallais (0–1), R McHugh (0–1)	Report	C Murtagh (0–6), F Cregg (0–5), C Cregg (1–2), N Daly (0–3), C Daly (0–1), C Devaney (0–1), E Smith (0–1)	O'Donnell Park, Letterkenny; Referee: P Hughes

26/03/16; Round 6	Dublin	1–10 – 0–7	Donegal	Croke Park, Dublin; Referee: C Lane; Man of the Match: Kevin McManamon
26/03/16; Round 6	C Costello (0–3), K McManamon (0–3), P McMahon (1–0), B Fenton (0–1), C Kilkenny (0–1), D Rock (0–1), P Andrews (0–1)	Report	P McBrearty (0–3), E McGee (0–1), M Murphy (0–1), O MacNiallais (0–1), R Kavanagh (0–1)	Croke Park, Dublin; Referee: C Lane; Man of the Match: Kevin McManamon

27/03/16; Round 6	Cork	0–12 – 0–7	Down	Páirc Uí Rinn, Cork; Referee: S Hurson
27/03/16; Round 6	C O'Neill (0–4), L Connolly (0–3), M Collins (0–3), P Kerrigan (0–2)	Report	D O'Hare (0–3), C McGovern (0–1), D O'Hanlon (0–1), M Cunningham (0–1), M Poland (0–1)	Páirc Uí Rinn, Cork; Referee: S Hurson

27/03/16; Round 6	Monaghan	1–9 – 1–17	Kerry	St Tiernach's Park, Clones; Referee: D Coldrick
27/03/16; Round 6	C McManus (0–5), D Hughes (1–0), D Mone (0–1), K O'Connell (0–1), R Beggan (0–1), R McAnespie (0–1)	Report	C Cooper (0–6), A Fitzgerald (0–4), D Moran (1–1), B J Keane (0–2), K Donaghy (0–2), D O'Sullivan (0–1), P Murphy (0–1)	St Tiernach's Park, Clones; Referee: D Coldrick

27/03/16; Round 6	Roscommon	1–7 – 1–11	Mayo	Dr. Hyde Park, Roscommon; Referee: M Deegan
27/03/16; Round 6	D Murtagh (1–1), C Murtagh (0–3), C Devaney (0–2), F Cregg (0–1)	Report	E Regan (1–3), A Freeman (0–3), R Hennelly (0–2), C O'Connor (0–1), C O'Shea (0–1), P Durcan (0–1)	Dr. Hyde Park, Roscommon; Referee: M Deegan

03/04/16; Round 7	Kerry	0–20 – 1–12	Cork	Austin Stack Park, Tralee; Referee: D Gough
03/04/16; Round 7	C Cooper (0–6), A Fitzgerald (0–5), B O'Sullivan (0–1), D Moran (0–1), D Walsh (0–1), F Fitzgerald (0–1), J Buckley (0–1), K Donaghy (0–1), M Griffin (0–1), M O Se (0–1), S O'Brien (0–1)	Report	B Hurley (0–6), C O'Neill (1–3), B O'Driscoll (0–1), D Goulding (0–1), P Kerrigan (0–1)	Austin Stack Park, Tralee; Referee: D Gough

03/04/16; Round 7	Mayo	1–19 – 1–16	Down	MacHale Park, Castlebar; Attendance: 8,352; Referee: J McQuillan
03/04/16; Round 7	E Regan (0–9), C O'Connor (1–4), A Freeman (0–2), A Moran (0–1), A O'Shea (0–1), C Barrett (0–1), J Doherty (0–1)	Report	D O'Hare (1–5), M Cunningham (0–2), S Dornan (0–2), D McKibbon (0–1), D O'Hanlon (0–1), K McKernan (0–1), M Poland (0–1), P Devlin (0–1), P Turley (0–1), R Mallon (0–1)	MacHale Park, Castlebar; Attendance: 8,352; Referee: J McQuillan

03/04/16; Round 7	Monaghan	1–10 – 1–9	Donegal	St Tiernach's Park, Clones; Referee: R Hickey
03/04/16; Round 7	C McManus (0–6), D McKenna (1–1), C Walshe (0–1), D Hughes (0–1), R McAnespie (0–1)	Report	M Murphy (0–3), M McElhinney (1–0), P McBrearty (0–2), A Thompson (0–1), E McHugh (0–1), O MacNiallais (0–1), R McHugh (0–1)	St Tiernach's Park, Clones; Referee: R Hickey

03/04/16; Round 7	Roscommon	1–12 – 1–13	Dublin	Páirc Seán Mac Diarmada, Carrick-on-Shannon; Referee: D O'Mahoney
03/04/16; Round 7	C Murtagh (0–5), D Shine (0–3), S Kilbride (1–0), C Devaney (0–2), F Cregg (0–1), N Daly (0–1)	Report	D Rock (1–8), S B Carthy (0–2), C McHugh (0–1), J Small (0–1), K McManamon (0–1)	Páirc Seán Mac Diarmada, Carrick-on-Shannon; Referee: D O'Mahoney

=== Division 1 Semi-Finals ===
10/04/16; 2:00 pm	Kerry	3–15 – 0–14	Roscommon	Croke Park, Dublin; Referee: P Hughes
10/04/16; 2:00 pm	C Cooper (1–5), D O'Sullivan (1–4), D Walsh (1–0), P Murphy (0–2), M O Se (0–1), J Buckley (0–1), BJ Keane (0–1), B O’Sullivan (0–1)	Report	C Murtagh (0–4), D Murtagh (0–4), N Collins (0–2), G Claffey (0–1), S McDermott (0–1), C Devaney (0–1), D Shine (0–1)	Croke Park, Dublin; Referee: P Hughes

10/04/16; 4:00 pm	Dublin	1–20 – 0–13	Donegal	Croke Park, Dublin; Referee: M Deegan; Man of the Match: Ciaran Kilkenny
10/04/16; 4:00 pm	D Rock (0–5), B Brogan (1–2), C Kilkenny (0–3), P Mannion (0–2), P Andrews (0–2), P McMahon (0–1), J Cooper (0–1), J McCarthy (0–1), J Small (0–1), C Costello (0–1), E Lowndes (0–1)	Report	P McBrearty (0–8), M Murphy (0–4), M McElhinney (0–1)	Croke Park, Dublin; Referee: M Deegan; Man of the Match: Ciaran Kilkenny

=== Division 1 Final ===
24/04/16; 3:30 pm	Dublin	2–18 – 0–13	Kerry	Croke Park, Dublin; Attendance: 82,300; Referee: Eddie Kinsella (Laois); Man of the Match: Ciaran Kilkenny (Castleknock)
24/04/16; 3:30 pm	Dean Rock 0–5 (0–4f), Bernard Brogan 0–4, Paul Flynn and Eric Lowndes 1–0 each, Ciaran Kilkenny and Kevin McManamon 0–2 each, Jonny Cooper, Brian Fenton, Paul Mannion, Diarmuid Connolly, Cormac Costello 0–1 each	Report	Bryan Sheehan 0–3f, Peter Crowley, Darran O'Sullivan, Stephen O'Brien 0–2 each, Kieran Donaghy, Paul Murphy, Donnchadh Walsh, Colm Cooper 0–1 each	Croke Park, Dublin; Attendance: 82,300; Referee: Eddie Kinsella (Laois); Man of the Match: Ciaran Kilkenny (Castleknock)

== Division 2 ==
=== Table ===
Compete in Division 2 final and automatic promotion to Division 1
Automatic relegation to Division 3

Team	Pld	W	D	L	F	A	Diff	Pts
Tyrone	7	5	2	0	6-89	3-76	22	12
Cavan	7	5	0	2	8-102	3-81	36	10
Galway	7	2	3	2	7-96	7-91	5	7
Fermanagh	7	2	2	3	2-85	6-75	-2	6
Meath	7	2	2	3	6-82	5-91	-6	6
Derry	7	2	2	3	13-86	9-106	-8	6
Armagh	7	2	2	3	4-86	6-96	-16	6
Laois	7	1	1	5	4-93	11-103	-31	3

^{1}Fermanagh, Meath, Derry and Armagh are ranked by scoring difference.

=== Rounds 1 to 7 ===
31/01/16; Round 1	Derry	3–13 – 1–10	Fermanagh	Owenbeg Derry GAA Centre, Owenbeg; Referee: Marty Duffy
31/01/16; Round 1	M Lynch (1–2), J Kielt (0–4), R Bell (0–3), B Heron (1–0), C O'Boyle (1–0), E Bradley (0–2), C Bradley (0–1), C McAtamney (0–1)		R Corrigan (1–1), S Quigley (0–3), T Corrigan (0–3), A Breen (0–1), D McCusker (0–1), R Hanna (0–1)	Owenbeg Derry GAA Centre, Owenbeg; Referee: Marty Duffy

31/01/16; Round 1	Meath	1–10 – 0–8	Armagh	Páirc Tailteann, Navan; Referee: A Nolan
31/01/16; Round 1	M Newman (1–4), S Tobin (0–3), C O'Sullivan (0–2), D Keogan (0–1)		G McParland (0–2), M McKenna (0–2), C Watters (0–1), E Rafferty (0–1), S Campell (0–1), S Forker (0–1)	Páirc Tailteann, Navan; Referee: A Nolan

31/01/16; Round 1	Tyrone	0–10 – 0–8	Cavan	Healy Park, Omagh; Referee: D Coldrick
31/01/16; Round 1	L Brennan (0–3), C McAliskey (0–2), D McCurry (0–1), Justin McMahon (0–1), M Bradley (0–1), M Donnelly (0–1), R Brennan (0–1)		G McKiernan (0–2), M Reilly (0–2), C Mackey (0–1), E Keating (0–1), K Clarke (0–1), N McDermott (0–1)	Healy Park, Omagh; Referee: D Coldrick

31/01/16; Round 1	Laois	1–10 – 3–12	Galway	O'Moore Park, Portlaoise; Referee: C Branagan
31/01/16; Round 1	D Kingston (0–3), P Cahillane (0–3), D O'Reilly (1–0), D Strong (0–1), E O'Carroll (0–1), G Walsh (0–1), P Kingston (0–1)		D Comer (2–2), A Varley (1–1), E Hoare (0–2), G O'Donnell (0–2), P Conroy (0–2), D Wynne (0–1), E Brannigan (0–1), J Heaney (0–1)	O'Moore Park, Portlaoise; Referee: C Branagan

06/02/16; Round 2	Armagh	0–15 – 1–13	Laois	Athletic Grounds, Armagh; Referee: B Cassidy
06/02/16; Round 2	S Campbell (0–6), M McKenna (0–3), G McParland (0–2), A Forker (0–1), E Rafferty (0–1), N Grimley (0–1), S Heffron (0–1)		D Kingston (0–5), P Cahillane (1–2), E O'Carroll (0–3), G Walsh (0–1), M Campion (0–1), Niall Donoher (0–1)	Athletic Grounds, Armagh; Referee: B Cassidy

06/02/16; Round 2	Cavan	1–11 – 1–12	Derry	Breffni Park, Cavan; Referee: P Neilan
06/02/16; Round 2	G McKiernan (0–3), M Argue (1–0), C Mackey (0–1), D Givney (0–1), D McVeety (0–1), E Keating (0–1), M Reilly (0–1), P O'Connor (0–1), S Johnston (0–1), T Corr (0–1)		M Lynch (0–3), C O'Boyle (1–0), C McFaul (0–2), J Kielt (0–2), B Heron (0–1), D Heavron (0–1), E Bradley (0–1), M Craig (0–1), S Heavron (0–1)	Breffni Park, Cavan; Referee: P Neilan

07/02/16; Round 2	Fermanagh	0–10 – 0–6	Meath	Brewster Park, Enniskillen; Referee: S Hurson
07/02/16; Round 2	T Corrigan (0–4), S Quigley (0–3), A Breen (0–1), B Mulrone (0–1), E Donnelly (0–1)		S Tobin (0–3), C O'Sullivan (0–1), D Lenihan (0–1), M Newman (0–1)	Brewster Park, Enniskillen; Referee: S Hurson

07/02/16; Round 2	Galway	1–9 – 1–11	Tyrone	Pearse Stadium, Salthill; Referee: D O'Mahony
07/02/16; Round 2	E Brannigan (0–3), E Hoare (0–3), D Comer (1–0), L Silke (0–1), P Cooke (0–1), S Walsh (0–1)		T McCann (1–0), D McCurry (0–2), L Brennan (0–2), M Bradley (0–2), R O'Neill (0–2), C McAliskey (0–1), R Brennan (0–1), S Cavanagh (0–1)	Pearse Stadium, Salthill; Referee: D O'Mahony

28/02/16; Round 3	Armagh	1–10 – 0–12	Fermanagh	Athletic Grounds, Armagh; Referee: C Reilly
28/02/16; Round 3	S Campbell (1–5), M McKenna (0–3), C Watters (0–1), N Grimley (0–1)		T Corrigan (0–5), S Quigley (0–3), A Breen (0–2), P Rehill (0–1), R Corrigan (0–1)	Athletic Grounds, Armagh; Referee: C Reilly

28/02/16; Round 3	Derry	2–12 – 1–18	Galway	Celtic Park, Derry; Referee: C Branagan
28/02/16; Round 3	R Bell (0–6), J Kielt (0–3), E McGuckin (1–0), N Loughlin (1–0), B Rogers (0–1), E Bradley (0–1), M Lynch (0–1)		J Heaney (0–4), A Varley (1–1), E Brannigan (0–3), E Hoare (0–3), E Tierney (0–2), P Conroy (0–2), D Comer (0–1), L Silke (0–1), S Walsh (0–1)	Celtic Park, Derry; Referee: C Branagan

28/02/16; Round 3	Laois	0–14 – 1–14	Tyrone	O'Moore Park, Portlaoise; Referee: P O'Sullivan
28/02/16; Round 3	D Kingston (0–5), J O'Loughlin (0–3), G Walsh (0–2), K Lillis (0–1), P Cahillane (0–1), P Kingston (0–1), R O'Connor (0–1)		M Donnelly (0–3), R O'Neill (0–3), P McNulty (1–0), D McCurry (0–2), N Sludden (0–2), T McCann (0–2), B Tierney (0–1), M Bradley (0–1)	O'Moore Park, Portlaoise; Referee: P O'Sullivan

28/02/16; Round 3	Meath	1–13 – 1–20	Cavan	Páirc Tailteann, Navan; Referee: R Hickey
28/02/16; Round 3	E Wallace (1–3), M Newman (0–4), S Tobin (0–3), G Reilly (0–2), D Tobin (0–1)		S Johnston (0–6), D McVeety (0–3), D Givney (1–0), C Moynagh (0–2), G McKiernan (0–2), N Murray (0–2), J McLoughlin (0–1), M Argue (0–1), P O'Connor (0–1), R Galligan (0–1), T Corr (0–1)	Páirc Tailteann, Navan; Referee: R Hickey

05/03/16; Round 4	Cavan	3–18 – 0–10	Armagh	Breffni Park, Cavan; Referee: M Deegan
05/03/16; Round 4	G McKiernan (1–5), S Johnston (1–5), D Givney (1–1), J McLoughlin (0–2), M Argue (0–2), D McVeety (0–1), M Reilly (0–1), P Faulkner (0–1)		S Campbell (0–3), E Rafferty (0–2), G McParland (0–2), C O'Hanlon (0–1), M McKenna (0–1), S Sheridan (0–1)	Breffni Park, Cavan; Referee: M Deegan

05/03/16; Round 4	Tyrone	2–15 – 0–12	Derry	Healy Park, Omagh; Referee: D Coldrick
05/03/16; Round 4	R O'Neill (0–6), R Donnelly (0–4), S Cavanagh (1–1), A McCrory (1–0), K McGeary (0–2), C Meyler (0–1), P Harte (0–1)		J Kielt (0–3), C Bradley (0–2), R Bell (0–2), C McFaul (0–1), C McKaigue (0–1), D Heavron (0–1), E Bradley (0–1), E McGuckin (0–1)	Healy Park, Omagh; Referee: D Coldrick

06/03/16; Round 4	Fermanagh	1–17 – 0–10	Laois	Brewster Park, Enniskillen; Referee: M Duffy
06/03/16; Round 4	T Corrigan (1–11), B Mulrone (0–2), A Breen (0–1), D McCusker (0–1), P McCusker (0–1), R Jones (0–1)		D Kingston (0–6), P Kingston (0–2), A Farrell (0–1), D Strong (0–1)	Brewster Park, Enniskillen; Referee: M Duffy

06/03/16; Round 4	Galway	0–15 – 1–12	Meath	Pearse Stadium, Salthill; Referee: C Lane
06/03/16; Round 4	E Hoare (0–4), S Walsh (0–3), P Conroy (0–2), T Flynn (0–2), A Varley (0–1), D Comer (0–1), G O'Donnell (0–1), G Sice (0–1)		M Newman (1–2), E Wallace (0–3), G Reilly (0–3), S Tobin (0–2), C O'Brien (0–1), D Lenihan (0–1)	Pearse Stadium, Salthill; Referee: C Lane

12/03/16; Round 5	Fermanagh	0–9 – 1–12	Cavan	Brewster Park, Enniskillen; Referee: C Brannigan
12/03/16; Round 5	T Corrigan (0–6), S Quigley (0–2), A Breen (0–1)		G McKiernan (0–4), S Johnston (1–1), D Givney (0–1), J McLoughlin (0–1), L Buchanan (0–1), M Reilly (0–1), P Faulkner (0–1), R Galligan (0–1), T Corr (0–1)	Brewster Park, Enniskillen; Referee: C Brannigan

13/03/16; Round 5	Laois	1–22 – 5–10	Derry	O'Moore Park, Portlaoise; Referee: A Nolan
13/03/16; Round 5	E O'Carroll (0–6), J O'Loughlin (0–4), P Kingston (1–0), C Meredith (0–2), D Kingston (0–2), D Strong (0–2), Niall Donoher (0–2), P Cahillane (0–2), B Quigley (0–1), G Walsh (0–1)		C Bradley (2–1), S Heavron (1–2), R Bell (0–3), D Heavron (1–0), M Lynch (1–0), C O'Boyle (0–1), E Bradley (0–1), J Kielt (0–1), K McKaigue (0–1)	O'Moore Park, Portlaoise; Referee: A Nolan

13/03/16; Round 5	Meath	1–11 – 1–17	Tyrone	Páirc Tailteann, Navan; Referee: F Kelly
13/03/16; Round 5	M Newman (1–7), A Tormay (0–1), C O'Sullivan (0–1), J McEntee (0–1), P Harnan (0–1)		R O'Neill (1–4), P Harte (0–3), S Cavanagh (0–3), J Monroe (0–2), M Donnelly (0–2), H P McGeary (0–1), N Sludden (0–1), R Donnelly (0–1)	Páirc Tailteann, Navan; Referee: F Kelly

13/03/16; Round 5	Armagh	1–15 – 1–15	Galway	Athletic Grounds, Armagh; Referee: S Hurson
13/03/16; Round 5	S Campbell (1–9), C Watters (0–2), G McParland (0–2), B Donaghy (0–1), E Rafferty (0–1)		E Hoare (0–4), S Walsh (0–4), D Cummins (1–1), P Conroy (0–2), A Varley (0–1), D Comer (0–1), G Sice (0–1), L Silke (0–1)	Athletic Grounds, Armagh; Referee: S Hurson

26/03/16; Round 6	Tyrone	0–13 – 1–10	Armagh	Healy Park, Omagh; Referee: P Neilan
26/03/16; Round 6	R O'Neill (0–5), C McAliskey (0–3), D McCurry (0–2), R Donnelly (0–2), M Bradley (0–1)		S Campbell (0–6), N Grimley (1–0), C Watters (0–2), A Forker (0–1), T Kernan (0–1)	Healy Park, Omagh; Referee: P Neilan

27/03/16; Round 6	Cavan	1–17 – 0–15	Laois	Breffni Park, Cavan; Referee: P O'Sullivan
27/03/16; Round 6	S Johnston (1–3), G McKiernan (0–3), J Brady (0–2), M Argue (0–2), C Brady (0–1), C Moynagh (0–1), D Givney (0–1), L Buchanan (0–1), M Reilly (0–1), R Galligan (0–1), T Corr (0–1)		D Kingston (0–4), E O'Carroll (0–3), J O'Loughlin (0–3), C Begley (0–2), R Munnelly (0–2), J Farrell (0–1)	Breffni Park, Cavan; Referee: P O'Sullivan

27/03/16; Round 6	Derry	2–12 – 2–12	Meath	Owenbeg Derry GAA Centre, Owenbeg; Referee: S McLaughlin
27/03/16; Round 6	J Kielt (0–4), B Heron (0–3), D Heavron (1–0), N Loughlin (1–0), C Bradley (0–2), M Lynch (0–2), R Bell (0–1)		M Newman (1–6), D McDonagh (0–3), C O'Sullivan (1–0), S Tobin (0–2), A Tormey (0–1)	Owenbeg Derry GAA Centre, Owenbeg; Referee: S McLaughlin

27/03/16; Round 6	Galway	0–15 – 0–15	Fermanagh	St Jarlath's Park, Tuam; Referee: J Henry
27/03/16; Round 6	D Comer (0–4), G Sice (0–3), P Sweeney (0–2), S Walsh (0–2), A Varley (0–1), D Cummins (0–1), E Brannigan (0–1), E Hoare (0–1)		T Corrigan (0–7), S Quigley (0–3), R Jones (0–2), R Lyons (0–2), D McCusker (0–1)	St Jarlath's Park, Tuam; Referee: J Henry

03/04/16; Round 7	Armagh	1–18 – 0–15	Derry	Athletic Grounds, Armagh; Referee: F Kelly
03/04/16; Round 7	E Rafferty (0–7), M McKenna (1–1), S Campbell (0–3), R Grugan (0–2), A Mallon (0–1), C O'Hanlon (0–1), C Watters (0–1), G McParland (0–1), M Shields (0–1)		M Lynch (0–7), J Kielt (0–3), C Bradley (0–2), E McGuckin (0–1), R Bell (0–1), SL McGoldrick (0–1)	Athletic Grounds, Armagh; Referee: F Kelly

03/04/16; Round 7	Cavan	1–16 – 1–12	Galway	Pearse Stadium, Galway; Referee: Â E Kinsella
03/04/16; Round 7	G McKiernan (0–5), D Givney (1–1), E Keating (0–2), J Brady (0–2), R Galligan (0–2), D McVeety (0–1), K Clarke (0–1), L Buchanan (0–1), N Murray (0–1)		S Walsh (0–4), D Comer (1–1), G Sice (0–3), E Brannigan (0–2), D Cummins (0–1), D Wynne (0–1)	Pearse Stadium, Galway; Referee: Â E Kinsella

03/04/16; Round 7	Fermanagh	0–12 – 1–9	Tyrone	Brewster Park, Enniskillen; Referee: A Nolan
03/04/16; Round 7	S Quigley (0–3), R Lyons (0–2), T Corrigan (0–2), D Kelly (0–1), D Teague (0–1), E Donnelly (0–1), P Cadden (0–1), P McCusker (0–1)		B Tierney (1–0), R Donnelly (0–2), R O'Neill (0–2), D McCurry (0–1), M Bradley (0–1), N Sludden (0–1), R Brennan (0–1), T McCann (0–1)	Brewster Park, Enniskillen; Referee: A Nolan

03/04/16; Round 7	Laois	1–9 – 0–18	Meath	O'Moore Park, Portlaoise; Referee: M McNally
03/04/16; Round 7	Niall Donoher (1–1), E O'Carroll (0–2), G Walsh (0–2), C Meredith (0–1), D Kingston (0–1), J O'Loughlin (0–1), R Munnelly (0–1)		M Newman (0–4), G Reilly (0–3), C O'Brien (0–2), S Tobin (0–2), A Tormey (0–1), C Downey (0–1), C O'Sullivan (0–1), D McDonagh (0–1), D Smith (0–1), D Tobin (0–1), M Burke (0–1)	O'Moore Park, Portlaoise; Referee: M McNally

=== Division 2 Final ===
24/04/16	Tyrone	1–17 – 0–15	Cavan	Croke Park, Dublin; Referee: Ciaran Branagan (Down)
24/04/16	R O'Neill (1–3), C McAliskey (0–5), S Cavanagh (0–3), M Donnelly (0–2), M Bradley (0–1), P Harte (0–1), R Brennan (0–1), T McCann (0–1)	Report	G McKiernan (0–3), D McVeety (0–2), R Galligan (0–1), C Moynagh (0–1), T Corr (0–1), L Buchanan (0–1), M Reilly (0–1), D Givney (0–1), M Argue (0–1), S Johnston (0–1)	Croke Park, Dublin; Referee: Ciaran Branagan (Down)

== Division 3 ==
=== Table ===
Compete in Division 3 final and automatic promotion to Division 2
Automatic relegation to Division 4

Team	Pld	W	D	L	F	A	Diff	Pts
Kildare	7	6	0	1	10-92	6-73	31	12
Clare	7	4	0	3	7-95	3-81	26	8
Offaly	7	4	0	3	3-85	5-80	-1	8
Longford	7	4	0	3	3-88	7-82	-6	8
Sligo	7	3	1	3	8-84	10-85	-7	7
Tipperary	7	2	3	2	12-60	5-90	-9	7
Westmeath	7	2	1	4	5-76	5-75	1	5
Limerick	7	0	1	6	4-73	11-87	-35	1

^{1}Clare, Offaly and Longford are ranked by scoring difference.

^{2}Sligo are ranked ahead of Tipperary by scoring difference as the head-to-head between the teams was a draw.

=== Rounds 1 to 7 ===
31/01/16; Round 1	Clare	1–11 – 0–7	Sligo	Hennessy Memorial Park, Milltown Malbay; Referee: J Bermingham
31/01/16; Round 1	D Tubridy (0–6), E Cleary (0–3), G Brennan (1–0), C O'Connor (0–1), S McGrath (0–1)		N Murphy (0–3), Brian Egan (0–1), K McDonnell (0–1), M Breheny (0–1), N Gaughan (0–1)	Hennessy Memorial Park, Milltown Malbay; Referee: J Bermingham

31/01/16; Round 1	Limerick	1–12 – 2–9	Tipperary	Gaelic Grounds, Limerick; Referee: B Cawley
31/01/16; Round 1	I Ryan (0–9), P Nash (1–0), S Buckley (0–2), S Cahill (0–1)		C Sweeney (0–4), P Acheson (1–1), J Keane (1–0), P Austin (0–2), A Maloney (0–1), M Dunne (0–1)	Gaelic Grounds, Limerick; Referee: B Cawley

31/01/16; Round 1	Offaly	0–12 – 0–10	Longford	O'Connor Park, Tullamore; Referee: F Barry
31/01/16; Round 1	B Allen (0–5), N McNamee (0–3), G Guilfoyle (0–2), J O'Connor (0–1), S Doyle (0–1)		B McKeon (0–5), F McGee (0–2), M Quinn (0–2), A Dalton (0–1)	O'Connor Park, Tullamore; Referee: F Barry

31/01/16; Round 1	Westmeath	0–11 – 2–9	Kildare	Cusack Park, Mullingar; Referee: N Mooney
31/01/16; Round 1	J Heslin (0–6), K Martin (0–3), C McCormack (0–1), G Egan (0–1)		A Tyrrell (0–3), N Kelly (0–3), C O'Donoghue (1–0), Daniel Flynn (1–0), C McNally (0–2), P Cribbin (0–1)	Cusack Park, Mullingar; Referee: N Mooney

07/02/16; Round 2	Kildare	1–12 – 1–8	Offaly	St Conleth's Park, Newbridge; Referee: J Henry
07/02/16; Round 2	N Flynn (0–4), N Kelly (0–4), C McNally (1–0), P Cribbin (0–2), A Tyrrell (0–1), K Feely (0–1)		P Cunningham (1–1), N McNamee (0–2), B Allen (0–1), C Donoghue (0–1), G Guilfoyle (0–1), J Maher (0–1), S Moriarty (0–1)	St Conleth's Park, Newbridge; Referee: J Henry

07/02/16; Round 2	Longford	0–13 – 1–8	Limerick	Pearse Park, Longford; Referee: J Molloy
07/02/16; Round 2	B Kavanagh (0–5), F McGee (0–2), B Farrell (0–1), B McKeon (0–1), D Reynolds (0–1), J McGivney (0–1), L Connerton (0–1), M Hughes (0–1)		I Ryan (0–5), T Lee (1–0), P Nash (0–2), D Neville (0–1)	Pearse Park, Longford; Referee: J Molloy

07/02/16; Round 2	Sligo	1–11 – 1–10	Westmeath	Markievicz Park, Sligo; Referee: S McLaughlin
07/02/16; Round 2	N Murphy (0–5), M Breheny (0–4), Kyle Cawley (1–0), Brendan Egan (0–1), G O'Kelly Lynch (0–1)		J Heslin (0–7), G Egan (1–0), K Martin (0–1), R Connellan (0–1), S Dempsey (0–1)	Markievicz Park, Sligo; Referee: S McLaughlin

07/02/16; Round 2	Tipperary	2–7 – 1–7	Clare	Clonmel GAA Ground, Clonmel; Referee: P O'Sullivan
07/02/16; Round 2	P Austin (0–4), B Fox (1–1), C Sweeney (1–0), J Keane (0–1), P Acheson (0–1)		D Tubridy (0–3), J Malone (1–0), E Cleary (0–2), G Brennan (0–2)	Clonmel GAA Ground, Clonmel; Referee: P O'Sullivan

28/02/16; Round 3	Longford	0–10 – 2–11	Kildare	Pearse Park, Longford; Referee: N Ward
28/02/16; Round 3	B Kavanagh (0–2), M Hughes (0–2), B Farrell (0–1), B McKeon (0–1), D Masterson (0–1), F McGee (0–1), L Connerton (0–1), R Smyth (0–1)		E O'Flaherty (1–2), F Dowling (0–3), N Kelly (0–3), T Moolick (1–0), C McNally (0–1), C O'Donoghue (0–1), K Feely (0–1)	Pearse Park, Longford; Referee: N Ward

28/02/16; Round 3	Offaly	1–13 – 0–14	Sligo	O'Connor Park, Tullamore; Referee: E O'Grady
28/02/16; Round 3	N Dunne (0–5), N McNamee (0–3), N Bracken (1–0), A Sullivan (0–1), B Allen (0–1), J O'Connor (0–1), M Brazil (0–1), P Cunningham (0–1)		N Murphy (0–7), M Breheny (0–4), P Hughes (0–2), C Davey (0–1)	O'Connor Park, Tullamore; Referee: E O'Grady

28/02/16; Round 3	Westmeath	0–11 – 1–8	Tipperary	Cusack Park, Mullingar; Referee: F Barry
28/02/16; Round 3	J Connellan (0–3), J Heslin (0–3), K Martin (0–3), J Egan (0–1), S Dempsey (0–1)		A Maloney (0–3), R Kiely (1–0), C Sweeney (0–2), B Fox (0–1), M Quinlivan (0–1), S Leahy (0–1)	Cusack Park, Mullingar; Referee: F Barry

28/02/16; Round 3	Limerick	0–11 – 1–14	Clare	Newcastlewest GAA Field, Newcastlewest; Referee: J Hickey
28/02/16; Round 3	I Ryan (0–5), S McSweeney (0–2), B Scanlon (0–1), D Neville (0–1), S Buckley (0–1), S Cahill (0–1)		D Tubridy (0–6), S McGrath (0–4), G Brennan (1–0), E Cleary (0–2), S Collins (0–2)	Newcastlewest GAA Field, Newcastlewest; Referee: J Hickey

06/03/16; Round 4	Tipperary	2–11 – 0–12	Offaly	Sean Treacy Park, Tipperary; Referee: J Molloy
06/03/16; Round 4	M Quinlivan (1–4), C Sweeney (0–6), M Dunne (1–0), P Austin (0–1)		N Dunne (0–4), N McNamee (0–3), S Doyle (0–3), B Allen (0–1), S Pender (0–1)	Sean Treacy Park, Tipperary; Referee: J Molloy

06/03/16; Round 4	Clare	1–18 – 0–10	Westmeath	Cusack Park, Ennis; Referee: J Henry
06/03/16; Round 4	E Cleary (0–6), D Tubridy (0–5), J Malone (1–1), C O'Connor (0–1), E Coughlan (0–1), Gordon Kelly (0–1), P Lillis (0–1), S Collins (0–1), S Haugh (0–1)		J Heslin (0–6), J Connellan (0–1), K Martin (0–1), R Foley (0–1), S Dempsey (0–1)	Cusack Park, Ennis; Referee: J Henry

06/03/16; Round 4	Kildare	1–11 – 1–10	Limerick	St Conleth's Park, Newbridge; Referee: N Cullen
06/03/16; Round 4	N Kelly (1–1), E O'Flaherty (0–3), A Smith (0–2), E Callaghan (0–2), F Dowling (0–1), J Byrne (0–1), K Feely (0–1)		I Ryan (0–6), B O'Donovan (1–0), S McSweeney (0–2), D Neville (0–1), S Buckley (0–1)	St Conleth's Park, Newbridge; Referee: N Cullen

06/03/16; Round 4	Sligo	2–9 – 1–16	Longford	Markievicz Park, Sligo; Referee: M McNally
06/03/16; Round 4	Brian Egan (2–0), N Murphy (0–3), M Breheny (0–2), P Hughes (0–2), C Breheny (0–1), D Rooney (0–1)		D Gallagher (1–3), B Kavanagh (0–4), R Smyth (0–4), B McKeon (0–2), M Hughes (0–2), J McGivney (0–1), M Quinn (0–1)	Markievicz Park, Sligo; Referee: M McNally

12/03/16; Round 5	Limerick	0–7 – 3–14	Westmeath	Gaelic Grounds, Limerick; Referee: J Hickey
12/03/16; Round 5	I Ryan (0–3), P Nash (0–2), I Corbett (0–1), T Lee (0–1)		J Heslin (1–4), J Dolan (2–0), C McCormack (0–5), K Martin (0–2), S Dempsey (0–2), R Connellan (0–1)	Gaelic Grounds, Limerick; Referee: J Hickey

13/03/16; Round 5	Kildare	2–14 – 2–15	Sligo	St Conleth's Park, Newbridge; Referee: N Mooney
13/03/16; Round 5	P O'Neill (1–1), E O'Connor (0–3), N Kelly (0–3), E Callaghan (1–0), A Tyrrell (0–2), T Moolick (0–2), E O'Flaherty (0–1), J Byrne (0–1), M Byrne (0–1)		N Murphy (0–10), Kyle Cawley (1–1), K McDonnell (1–0), P Hughes (0–2), A McIntyre (0–1), Brian Egan (0–1)	St Conleth's Park, Newbridge; Referee: N Mooney

13/03/16; Round 5	Longford	1–17 – 1–11	Tipperary	Pearse Park, Longford; Referee: S McLaughlin
13/03/16; Round 5	B Kavanagh (0–8), J McGivney (0–5), L Moran (1–0), B McKeon (0–1), D Gallagher (0–1), L Connerton (0–1), M Hughes (0–1)		C Sweeney (0–6), M Quinlivan (0–4), J Lonergan (1–1)	Pearse Park, Longford; Referee: S McLaughlin

13/03/16; Round 5	Offaly	0–15 – 1–11	Clare	O'Connor Park, Tullamore; Referee: B Cawley
13/03/16; Round 5	B Allen (0–4), N Dunne (0–3), G Guilfoyle (0–2), M Brazil (0–2), A Sullivan (0–1), C McNamee (0–1), J Maher (0–1), J O'Connor (0–1)		D Tubridy (0–4), E Cleary (1–1), J Malone (0–2), E Coughlan (0–1), G Brennan (0–1), P Burke (0–1), S Collins (0–1)	O'Connor Park, Tullamore; Referee: B Cawley

27/03/16; Round 6	Clare	1–20 – 1–9	Longford	Cusack Park, Ennis; Referee: L Devenney
27/03/16; Round 6	D Tubridy (1–5), J Malone (0–5), E Cleary (0–4), K Sexton (0–2), P Lillis (0–2), C O'Connor (0–1), S McGrath (0–1)		B Kavanagh (0–6), M Quinn (1–0), B Farrell (0–1), D Masterson (0–1), J McGivney (0–1)	Cusack Park, Ennis; Referee: L Devenney

27/03/16; Round 6	Sligo	3–10 – 1–12	Limerick	Markievicz Park, Sligo; Referee: P Faloon
27/03/16; Round 6	N Murphy (0–5), Brian Egan (1–1), Kyle Cawley (1–1), Brendan Egan (1–0), A Marren (0–2), A McIntyre (0–1)		I Ryan (0–4), D Tracey (1–1), P Nash (0–2), B Fanning (0–1), C Fahy (0–1), D Neville (0–1), K Ryan (0–1), T Lee (0–1)	Markievicz Park, Sligo; Referee: P Faloon

27/03/16; Round 6	Westmeath	1–9 – 0–9	Offaly	Cusack Park, Mullingar; Referee: K Murphy
27/03/16; Round 6	P Greville (1–2), G Egan (0–2), S Dempsey (0–2), C McCormack (0–1), J Dolan (0–1), K Martin (0–1)		A Sullivan (0–2), E Carroll (0–1), G Guilfoyle (0–1), J Maher (0–1), J Moloney (0–1), M Brazil (0–1), N Dunne (0–1), N McNamee (0–1)	Cusack Park, Mullingar; Referee: K Murphy

26/03/16; Round 6	Tipperary	1–5 – 2–13	Kildare	Semple Stadium, Thurles; Referee: N Mooney
26/03/16; Round 6	K Fahey (1–1), A Moloney (0–2), M Quinlivan (0–1), P Austin (0–1)		D Flynn (1–2), A Tyrrell (0–3), E O'Flaherty (0–3), N Kelly (1–0), P Cribbin (0–2), T Moolick (0–2), E Callaghan (0–1)	Semple Stadium, Thurles; Referee: N Mooney

03/04/16; Round 7	Kildare	0–22 – 1–14	Clare	St Conleth's Park, Newbridge; Referee: C Reilly
03/04/16; Round 7	E O'Flaherty (0–7), A Smith (0–4), N Kelly (0–3), P Cribbin (0–3), E Callaghan (0–2), C Fitzpatrick (0–1), D Hyland (0–1), T Moolick (0–1)		D Tubridy (0–6), E Cleary (0–4), J Malone (0–4), P Burke (1–0)	St Conleth's Park, Newbridge; Referee: C Reilly

03/04/16; Round 7	Limerick	0–13 – 1–16	Offaly	Newcastlewest GAA Field, Newcastlewest; Referee: E O'Grady
03/04/16; Round 7	D Neville (0–6), P Nash (0–2), S Kelly (0–2), D Tracey (0–1), I Ryan (0–1), P White (0–1)		N Dunne (0–4), S Pender (1–0), L Fox (0–2), N McNamee (0–2), A Sullivan (0–1), E Carroll (0–1), G Guilfoyle (0–1), J Maher (0–1), J Moloney (0–1), M Brazil (0–1), N Smith (0–1), P Cunningham (0–1)	Newcastlewest GAA Field, Newcastlewest; Referee: E O'Grady

03/04/16; Round 7	Longford	0–13 – 0–11	Westmeath	Pearse Park, Longford; Referee: N Cullen
03/04/16; Round 7	B Kavanagh (0–5), B McKeon (0–3), R Smyth (0–2), D Reynolds (0–1), J McGivney (0–1), M Quinn (0–1)		J Heslin (0–5), C McCormack (0–3), J Egan (0–1), P Greville (0–1), S Dempsey (0–1)	Pearse Park, Longford; Referee: N Cullen

03/04/16; Round 7	Sligo	0–18 – 3–9	Tipperary	Markievicz Park, Sligo; Referee: N McKenna
03/04/16; Round 7	N Murphy (0–7), A Marren (0–4), K Cawley (0–3), B Egan (0–1), M Breheny (0–1), N Ewing (0–1), N Gaughan (0–1)		A Moloney (1–3), P Acheson (1–1), M Quinlivan (1–0), C Sweeney (0–2), E Comer (0–1), J Lonergan (0–1), K Fahey (0–1)	Markievicz Park, Sligo; Referee: N McKenna

=== Division 3 Final ===
23/04/16	Clare	2–17 – 1–19	Kildare	Croke Park, Dublin; Referee: Noel Mooney (Cavan)
23/04/16	E Cleary (1–6), D Tubridy (0–5),D Ryan (1–0), P Lillis (0–2), J Malone (0–2), P Collins (0–1), E Coughlan (0–1)	Report	N Flynn (1–6), A Tyrrell (0–6), E O’Flaherty (0–2), P Cribbin (0–2), A Smith (0–1), F Conway (0–1), T Moolick (0–1)	Croke Park, Dublin; Referee: Noel Mooney (Cavan)

== Division 4 ==
=== Table ===
Compete in Division 4 final and automatic promotion to Division 3

Team	Pld	W	D	L	F	A	Diff	Pts
Antrim	7	6	1	0	8-86	2-64	40	13
Louth	7	5	1	1	8-82	3-66	31	11
Wexford	7	5	0	2	10-104	8-68	42	10
Carlow	7	3	0	4	7-71	10-90	-28	6
Wicklow	7	3	0	4	7-75	9-92	-23	6
Waterford	7	2	0	5	5-78	3-92	-8	4
Leitrim	7	2	0	5	5-74	5-87	-13	4
London	7	1	0	6	4-71	14-82	-41	2

^{1}Carlow are ranked ahead of Wicklow because they won the head-to-head between the teams by 0-17 to 0-14.

^{2}Waterford are ranked ahead of Leitrim because they won the head-to-head between the teams by 0-17 to 1-13.

=== Rounds 1 to 7 ===
31/01/16; Round 1	Louth	2–9 – 0–9	London	Drogheda Park, Drogheda; Referee: P Faloon
31/01/16; Round 1	D Byrne (1–3), J McEneaney (1–3), D McMahon (0–1), J Stewart (0–1), R Moore (0–1)		L Mulvey (0–3), A Moyles (0–2), S Hickey (0–2), D Ryan (0–1), S Conroy (0–1)	Drogheda Park, Drogheda; Referee: P Faloon

31/01/16; Round 1	Carlow	0–10 – 1–12	Antrim	Dr. Cullen Park, Carlow; Referee: P Maguire
31/01/16; Round 1	D Foley (0–3), P Broderick (0–2), A Kelly (0–1), Brendan Murphy (0–1), D Hayden (0–1), J Murphy (0–1), JJ Smith (0–1)		M McCann (0–5), K Niblock (1–1), C Murray (0–3), J Lavery (0–1), M Fitzpatrick (0–1), P McAleer (0–1)	Dr. Cullen Park, Carlow; Referee: P Maguire

31/01/16; Round 1	Wexford	0–14 – 1–10	Leitrim	Wexford Park, Wexford; Referee: K Murphy
31/01/16; Round 1	K O'Grady (0–6), D Shanley (0–4), A Flynn (0–2), B Brosnan (0–2)		S Quinn (1–1), N O'Donnell (0–3), C Gaffney (0–2), E Mulligan (0–2), A Croal (0–1), K Conlan (0–1)	Wexford Park, Wexford; Referee: K Murphy

31/01/16; Round 1	Wicklow	0–13 – 1–8	Waterford	Aughrim County Ground, Aughrim; Referee: S Lonergan
31/01/16; Round 1	J McGrath (0–5), R Finn (0–4), C Hyland (0–1), E Doyle (0–1), J Crowe (0–1), S Kelly (0–1)		P Whyte (0–5), P Hurney (1–0), D Breathnach (0–2), S Corcoran (0–1)	Aughrim County Ground, Aughrim; Referee: S Lonergan

06/02/16; Round 2	London	1–11 – 4–4	Carlow	Emerald GAA Grounds, Ruislip; Referee: E O'Grady
06/02/16; Round 2	S Conroy (0–5), A Moyles (0–4), E Murray (1–0), L Gavaghan (0–1), S Hickey (0–1)		S Gannon (3–0), J Murphy (1–0), Brian Murphy (0–2), D Foley (0–1), JJ Smith (0–1)	Emerald GAA Grounds, Ruislip; Referee: E O'Grady

07/02/16; Round 2	Antrim	1–8 – 0–7	Wexford	Corrigan Park, Belfast; Referee: J Gilmartin
07/02/16; Round 2	T McCann (0–4), M Fitzpatrick (1–0), N McKeever (0–2), J Laverty (0–1), K Niblock (0–1)		D Shanley (0–4), A Flynn (0–1), N Hughes (0–1), PJ Banville (0–1)	Corrigan Park, Belfast; Referee: J Gilmartin

07/02/16; Round 2	Leitrim	1–6 – 0–10	Wicklow	Páirc Seán Mac Diarmada, Carrick-on-Shannon; Referee: S Laverty
07/02/16; Round 2	E Mulligan (1–1), N O'Donnell (0–2), J McGrail (0–1), J Rooney (0–1), N Woods (0–1)		D Hayden (0–2), J McGrath (0–2), M Kenny (0–2), R Finn (0–2), E Doyle (0–1), N Gaffney (0–1)	Páirc Seán Mac Diarmada, Carrick-on-Shannon; Referee: S Laverty

07/02/16; Round 2	Waterford	1–9 – 1–10	Louth	Fraher Field, Dungarvan; Referee: M Collins
07/02/16; Round 2	P Whyte (0–5), G Crotty (1–1), D Breathnach (0–1), J Veale (0–1), P Hurney (0–1)		D Maguire (1–1), R Burns (0–2), R Holcroft (0–2), C Grimes (0–1), D Byrne (0–1), J Califf (0–1), J McEneaney (0–1), J Stewart (0–1)	Fraher Field, Dungarvan; Referee: M Collins

28/02/16; Round 3	Wexford	4–20 – 1–6	London	Wexford Park, Wexford; Referee: K Murphy
28/02/16; Round 3	D Shanley (0–8), J Tubritt (1–3), P Curtis (1–1), K Butler (0–3), D Waters (1–0), T Rossiter (1–0), B Brosnan (0–2), A Flynn (0–1), B Malone (0–1), C Kehoe (0–1)		S Hickey (1–1), A Moyles (0–3), L Mulvey (0–1), M Gottsche (0–1)	Wexford Park, Wexford; Referee: K Murphy

28/02/16; Round 3	Antrim	2–14 – 0–9	Leitrim	Corrigan Park, Belfast; Referee: N Cullen
28/02/16; Round 3	T McCann (1–8), B Neeson (1–2), C Murray (0–1), K Niblock (0–1), N McKeever (0–1), S Burke (0–1)		E Mulligan (0–6), K Conlan (0–2), R Kennedy (0–1)	Corrigan Park, Belfast; Referee: N Cullen

28/02/16; Round 3	Carlow	0–15 – 3–15	Waterford	Dr. Cullen Park, Carlow; Referee: N McKenna
28/02/16; Round 3	Brian Murphy (0–3), D Foley (0–3), A Kelly (0–2), JJ Smith (0–2), C Blake (0–1), D Hayden (0–1), E Finnegan (0–1), G Kelly (0–1), P Broderick (0–1)		P Hurney (2–5), D Breathnach (1–1), P Whyte (0–3), B Looby (0–1), C Prunty (0–1), J Veale (0–1), L O Currain (0–1), S Corcoran (0–1), T Prendergast (0–1)	Dr. Cullen Park, Carlow; Referee: N McKenna

28/02/16; Round 3	Louth	0–15 – 1–2	Wicklow	Drogheda Park, Drogheda; Referee: B Tiernan
28/02/16; Round 3	R Burns (0–5), R Holcroft (0–3), D Byrne (0–2), J McEneaney (0–2), B Flanagan (0–1), C McKeever (0–1), D Maguire (0–1)		P Cunningham (1–1), J McGrath (0–1)	Drogheda Park, Drogheda; Referee: B Tiernan

05/03/16; Round 4	Waterford	0–11 – 0–12	Wexford	Fraher Field, Dungarvan; Referee: S Hehir
05/03/16; Round 4	P Whyte (0–9), JJ Hutchinson (0–1), S Prendergast (0–1)		D Shanley (0–8), A Flynn (0–1), B Brosnan (0–1), J Tubritt (0–1), M O'Regan (0–1)	Fraher Field, Dungarvan; Referee: S Hehir

06/03/16; Round 4	Leitrim	0–16 – 2–9	Louth	Páirc Seán Mac Diarmada, Carrick-on-Shannon; Referee: N McKenna
06/03/16; Round 4	E Mulligan (0–7), R Kennedy (0–3), A Croal (0–2), D Wrynn (0–2), K Conlon (0–1), S Moran (0–1)		R Burns (1–4), D Maguire (1–0), J McEneaney (0–2), G McSorley (0–1), J Califf (0–1), K McLaughlin (0–1)	Páirc Seán Mac Diarmada, Carrick-on-Shannon; Referee: N McKenna

06/03/16; Round 4	London	0–11 – 1–11	Antrim	Emerald GAA Grounds, Ruislip; Referee: J Bermingham
06/03/16; Round 4	L Mulvey (0–5), A Moyles (0–4), C Og Greene (0–1), E Murray (0–1)		T McCann (0–4), K O'Boyle (1–1), C Murray (0–2), J Laverty (0–2), P McBride (0–1), R Murray (0–1)	Emerald GAA Grounds, Ruislip; Referee: J Bermingham

06/03/16; Round 4	Wicklow	0–14 – 0–17	Carlow	Aughrim County Ground, Aughrim; Referee: B Tiernan
06/03/16; Round 4	J McGrath (0–8), M Kenny (0–3), C Murphy (0–1), D Hayden (0–1), P Cunningham (0–1)		D Foley (0–10), J Murphy (0–2), Brendan Murphy (0–1), Brian Murphy (0–1), D St Ledger (0–1), G Kelly (0–1), G Power (0–1)	Aughrim County Ground, Aughrim; Referee: B Tiernan

13/03/16; Round 5	London	1–11 – 1–16	Leitrim	Emerald GAA Grounds, Ruislip; Referee: M Collins
13/03/16; Round 5	S Conroy (0–6), L Gavaghan (1–0), A Hanlon (0–2), E Murray (0–2), A Moyles (0–1)		K Conlan (1–2), E Mulligan (0–4), R Kennedy (0–4), C Gilheaney (0–2), S Moran (0–2), P Maguire (0–1), S McWeeney (0–1)	Emerald GAA Grounds, Ruislip; Referee: M Collins

13/03/16; Round 5	Antrim	1–16 – 0–6	Waterford	Corrigan Park, Belfast; Referee: P Falloon
13/03/16; Round 5	T McCann (0–5), B Neeson (0–4), M Fitzpatrick (1–0), D McAleese (0–2), J Carson (0–2), M Armstrong (0–1), P McBride (0–1), R Murray (0–1)		J Veale (0–2), JJ Hutchinson (0–1), K Murphy (0–1), M O'Gorman (0–1), M O'Halloran (0–1)	Corrigan Park, Belfast; Referee: P Falloon

13/03/16; Round 5	Carlow	1–7 – 2–17	Louth	Dr. Cullen Park, Carlow; Referee: S Lonergan
13/03/16; Round 5	D Foley (0–3), G Power (1–0), P Broderick (0–2), J Murphy (0–1), S Gannon (0–1)		C Grimes (2–1), J Califf (0–5), R Burns (0–4), D Byrne (0–2), T Durnin (0–2), C Judge (0–1), D Maguire (0–1), P Reilly (0–1)	Dr. Cullen Park, Carlow; Referee: S Lonergan

13/03/16; Round 5	Wexford	4–23 – 3–14	Wicklow	Wexford Park, Wexford; Referee: N Ward
13/03/16; Round 5	B Brosnan (2–5), D Shanley (0–9), J Tubritt (1–3), C Lyng (1–1), A Flynn (0–2), B Malone (0–1), K Butler (0–1), PJ Banville (0–1)		M Lennon (1–2), G Allen (1–1), P Cunningham (1–1), J McGrath (0–2), R Finn (0–2), A McLoughlin (0–1), D Hayden (0–1), D Healy (0–1), M Kenny (0–1), P Byrne (0–1), P O'Connor (0–1)	Wexford Park, Wexford; Referee: N Ward

27/03/16; Round 6	Waterford	0–12 – 0–13	London	Fraher Field, Dungarvan; Referee: S Lonergan
27/03/16; Round 6	JJ Hutchinson (0–9), G Crotty (0–2), C Prunty (0–1)		A Hanlon (0–3), M Gottsche (0–3), C Og Greene (0–1), D Molloy (0–1), D Moore (0–1), E Murray (0–1), L Gavaghan (0–1), L Mulvey (0–1), S Conroy (0–1)	Fraher Field, Dungarvan; Referee: S Lonergan

26/03/16; Round 6	Leitrim	1–4 – 0–12	Carlow	Páirc Seán Mac Diarmada, Carrick-on-Shannon; Referee: P Maguire
26/03/16; Round 6	E Mulligan (0–3), R Kennedy (1–0), P Maguire (0–1)		P Broderick (0–4), D Foley (0–3), C Blake (0–2), D Hayden (0–1), D St Ledger (0–1), G Kelly (0–1)	Páirc Seán Mac Diarmada, Carrick-on-Shannon; Referee: P Maguire

27/03/16; Round 6	Louth	0–13 – 0–11	Wexford	Drogheda Park, Drogheda; Referee: J Hickey
27/03/16; Round 6	C Grimes (0–3), D Byrne (0–3), J Califf (0–3), C Doyle (0–1), G McSorley (0–1), J McEneaney (0–1), R Burns (0–1)		D Shanley (0–6), PJ Banville (0–2), A Flynn (0–1), C Lyng (0–1), J Tubritt (0–1)	Drogheda Park, Drogheda; Referee: J Hickey

27/03/16; Round 6	Wicklow	1–12 – 2–13	Antrim	Aughrim County Ground, Aughrim; Referee: B Cawley
27/03/16; Round 6	R Finn (0–6), P Cunningham (0–5), G Allen (1–0), D Healy (0–1)		B Neeson (1–5), T McCann (1–1), M McCann (0–2), M Sweeney (0–2), C Murray (0–1), M Fitzpatrick (0–1), P McBride (0–1)	Aughrim County Ground, Aughrim; Referee: B Cawley

03/04/16; Round 7	Antrim	0–12 – 1–9	Louth	Corrigan Park, Belfast; Referee: S Hehir
03/04/16; Round 7	T McCann (0–4), B Neeson (0–3), M McCann (0–3), D McAleese (0–1), N McKeever (0–1)		G McSorley (1–1), C Judge (0–2), R Burns (0–2), C McKeever (0–1), E Lafferty (0–1), J Califf (0–1), R Moore (0–1)	Corrigan Park, Belfast; Referee: S Hehir

03/04/16; Round 7	London	1–10 – 2–10	Wicklow	Emerald GAA Grounds, Ruislip; Referee: S Laverty
03/04/16; Round 7	S Conroy (0–5), A Hanlon (0–3), L Gavaghan (1–0), E Murray (0–1), M Gottsche (0–1)		J McGrath (0–3), R Finn (0–3), D Healy (1–0), M O'Connor (1–0), D Hayden (0–2), M Kenny (0–2)	Emerald GAA Grounds, Ruislip; Referee: S Laverty

03/04/16; Round 7	Waterford	0–10 – 1–6	Leitrim	Fraher Field, Dungarvan; Referee: J Bermingham
03/04/16; Round 7	JJ Hutchinson (0–7), P Whyte (0–2), P Hurney (0–1)		R Kennedy (1–2), E Mulligan (0–2), B Prior (0–1), K McGrisken (0–1)	Fraher Field, Dungarvan; Referee: J Bermingham

03/04/16; Round 7	Wexford	2–17 – 2–6	Carlow	Wexford Park, Wexford; Referee: J Gilmartin
03/04/16; Round 7	C Lyng (1–4), D Shanley (0–5), S Ryan (1–1), J Tubritt (0–3), M Furlong (0–2), E Nolan (0–1), T Rossiter (0–1)		P Broderick (1–4), S Gannon (1–1), B Murphy (0–1)	Wexford Park, Wexford; Referee: J Gilmartin

=== Division 4 Final ===
23 April 2016; 4pm	Louth	3–12 – 1–14	Antrim	Croke Park, Dublin; Referee: Jerome Henry (Mayo); Man of the Match: Jim McEneaney
23 April 2016; 4pm	Maguire (1–2), McEneaney (1–1, 1sl), Burns (0–4, 3f), Byrne (0–3), Grimes (1–0), Califf (0–2, 2f)	Report	T. McCann (0–8, 6f), Fitzpatrick (1–1), Murray (0–2), R. Johnston (0–1), Neeson (0–1), McBride (0–1)	Croke Park, Dublin; Referee: Jerome Henry (Mayo); Man of the Match: Jim McEneaney

GK	1	Craig Lynch (Naomh Máirtin)
RCB	2	Pádraig Rath (Dreadnots) (c)
FB	3	Patrick Reilly (St Bride's)
LCB	4	Kevin Toner (St Patrick's)
RHB	5	Derek Maguire (Dundalk Young Irelands)
CHB	6	Darren McMahon (St Mochta's)
LHB	7	Eoghan Lafferty (St Patrick's)
MF	8	James Stewart (Dundalk Gaels)
MF	9	James Califf (Dreadnots)
RHF	10	Declan Byrne (St Mochta's)
CHF	11	Jim McEneaney (Geraldines)
LHF	12	Tommy Durnin (Westerns)
RCF	13	Conall McKeever (Clan na Gael)
FF	14	Conor Grimes (Glen Emmets)
LCF	15	Ryan Burns (Hunterstown Rovers)
Substitutes:
	16	John Bingham (St Mary's) for Toner
	17	Anthony Williams (Dreadnots) for Bingham (bc)
	18	Ruairí Moore (O'Raghallaighs) for McMahon
	19	Gerard McSorley (Dundalk Gaels) for Burns

GK	1	Chris Kerr (St Gall's)
RCB	2	Niall Delargy (Roger Casements)
FB	3	Conor Burke (St Gall's)
LCB	4	Richard Johnston (Creggan)
RHB	5	Kevin O'Boyle (Cargin)
CHB	6	Martin Johnston (Creggan)
LHB	7	James Laverty (Cargin)
MF	8	Niall McKeever (Roger Casements)
MF	9	Michael McCann (Cargin)
RHF	10	Conor Murray (Lámh Dhearg)
CHF	11	Kevin Niblock (St Gall's) (c)
LHF	12	John Carron (Cargin)
RCF	13	Brian Neeson (St John's)
FF	14	Matthew Fitzpatrick (St John's)
LCF	15	Tomás McCann (Cargin)
Substitutes:
	16	Ryan Murray (Lámh Dhearg) for Neeson
	17	Patrick McBride (St John's) for Carron
	18	Dermot McAleese (Roger Casements) for Fitzpatrick
	19	Mark Sweeney (St Jude's, Dublin) for Laverty
	20	Justin Crozier (Cargin) for Burke

== Statistics ==
- All scores correct as of 25 April 2016

=== Scoring ===
- First goal of the league:
  - Ryan McHugh for Donegal against Down (Div 1, Rd 1)
- Widest winning margin: 23 points
  - Wexford 4–20 – 1–6 London (Div 4, Rd 3)
- Most goals in a match: 7
  - Cork 3–10 – 4–25 Roscommon (Div 1, Rd 3)
- Most points in a match: 36
  - Clare 2–17 – 1–19 Kildare (Div 3 Final)
- Most goals by one team in a match: 5
  - Laois 1–22 – 5–11 Derry (Div 2, Rd 5)
- Highest aggregate score: 58 points
  - Wexford 4–23 – 3–14 Wicklow (Div 4, Rd 5)
- Lowest aggregate score: 16 points
  - Fermanagh 0–10 – 0–06 Meath (Div 2, Rd 2)
  - Mayo 0–07 – 0–09 Dublin (Div 1, Rd 2)

=== Top scorers ===
Overall

Rank	Player	County	Tally	Total	Matches	Average
1	Conor McManus	Monaghan	2–43	49	7	7.0
2	Donal Shanley	Wexford	0–44	44	7	6.3
3	David Tubridy	Clare	1–40	43	8	5.4
3	Dean Rock	Dublin	1–40	43	9	4.8
3	Ciarán Murtagh	Roscommon	4–31	43	8	5.4
6	Tomás Corrigan	Fermanagh	1–38	41	7	5.9
7	Niall Murphy	Sligo	0–40	40	7	5.7
7	Tomas McCann	Antrim	2–34	40	8	5.0
7	Mickey Newman	Meath	4–28	40	7	5.7
10	Stefan Campbell	Armagh	2–32	38	6	6.3
11	Michael Murphy	Donegal	1–33	36	8	4.5
11	Patrick McBrearty	Donegal	1–33	36	8	4.5
13	John Heslin	Westmeath	1–31	34	7	4.9
13	Eoin Cleary	Clare	2–28	34	8	4.3
15	Ian Ryan	Limerick	0–33	33	7	4.7
16	Ronan O'Neill	Tyrone	2–25	31	8	3.9

Single game

Rank	Player	County	Tally	Total	Opposition
1	Tomás Corrigan	Fermanagh	1–11	14	Laois
2	Conor McManus	Monaghan	0–12	12	Dublin
2	Stefan Campbell	Armagh	1–09	12	Galway
4	Tomas McCann	Antrim	1–08	11	Leitrim
4	Colm O'Neill	Cork	1–08	11	Monaghan
4	Dean Rock	Dublin	1–08	11	Roscommon
4	Conor McManus	Monaghan	1–08	11	Mayo
4	Patrick Hurney	Waterford	2–05	11	Carlow
4	Ben Brosnan	Wexford	2–05	11	Wicklow
10	Darragh Foley	Carlow	0–10	10	Wicklow
10	Niall Murphy	Sligo	0–10	10	Kildare
10	Mickey Newman	Meath	1–07	10	Tyrone
