= Donoher =

Donoher is a surname. Notable people with the surname include:

- Don Donoher (1932–2024), American basketball coach
- Niall Donoher (born 1986), Irish Gaelic footballer
