= Briotáis =

Briotáis may refer to two villages in Ireland:

- Ballybrittas, in the north-east of County Laois
- Brittas, County Dublin, near the border of County Wicklow
