= Sean O'Flynn =

Irish Gaelic footballer

Personal information
- Native name: Seán Ó Floinn (Irish)
- Nickname: Salmon
- Born: 15 August 2000 (age 26) Laois, Ireland
- Occupation: Student

Sport
- Sport: Gaelic Football
- Position: Half back
Club
- Years: Club
- 2018-: Courtwood
Inter-county
- Years: County
- 2019-: Laois

Sean O'Flynn is a Gaelic footballer from Ballybrittas in County Laois.

He usually plays in defence for the Laois county football team and in 2018 and again in 2019 was part of the Laois team that reached the final of the Leinster Under 20 Football Championship.

== Honours ==
Club

- Laois Intermediate Football Championship (1):2018
- Laois Under 20 Football Championship (1):2019
- Laois Minor Football Championship (1):2016
- Laois All-County Football League Division Two (2): 2018, 2023

County

- National Football League Division Four 2024
