= Declan Byrne =

Declan Byrne may refer to:

- Declan Byrne (Family Affairs), a character from the British soap opera Family Affairs
- Declan Byrne (Gaelic footballer), Irish sportsman
- Declan Byrne (radio presenter), Triple J radio presenter on Home & Hosed (2018–present)
