= Michael Lawlor =

Michael, Mike, or Mick Lawlor may refer to:

- Mike Lawlor (born 1956), American politician and lawyer from Connecticut
- Mike Lawlor (baseball) (1854–1918), American Major League Baseball catcher
- Mick Lawlor (association footballer) (born 1949), Irish association football forward
- Mick Lawlor (Gaelic footballer), Irish Gaelic football forward

== See also ==
- Michael Lawler (disambiguation)
