= Breaking Loose =

Breaking Loose may refer to:

- Breaking Loose (album), an album by the Canadian rock band Helix
- Breaking Loose (film), a 1988 Australian film
