= Carlingford =

Carlingford may refer to:

== Canada ==
- Carlingford, New Brunswick, Canada, a rural community near the US border
- Carlingford, Ontario, a community in southwestern Ontario, Canada

== Ireland ==
- Carlingford, County Louth, a medieval village in Ireland
- Carlingford Mountain, which rises nearby, the highest peak of which is known as Slieve Foy
- Carlingford Lough, the sea loch where the village is located

== Elsewhere ==
- Carlingford, New South Wales, a suburb in north-west Sydney, Australia
- Carlingford, a fictional small town in England, in the short stories of Margaret Oliphant (1828-1897)
