= Michael Lawler =

Michael Lawler could refer to:

- Michael Kelly Lawler (1814–1882), American military officer
- Mick Lawler (1942–2022), Irish hurler
- Mike Lawler (born 1986), American politician

== See also ==
- Michael Lawlor (disambiguation)
