= George Doyle =

Irish Gaelic footballer and manager

Personal information
- Native name: Seoirse Ó Dúghaill (Irish)
- Born: Ireland
- Height: 6 ft 4 in (193 cm)

Sport
- Sport: Gaelic football
- Position: Left half back/Midfield
Club
- Years: Club
- ? -?: Courtwood
Inter-county
- Years: County
- ?- ?: Laois

George Doyle is a former Gaelic footballer and manager from County Laois.

He played on the Laois senior football team throughout the 1990s, primarily as a defender but also in midfield. During that period he was also selected to play on the Leinster team.

In 1991, he played on the Laois team beaten by Meath in the final of the Leinster Senior Football Championship.

In 1993, he was a member of the Laois team that won the All-Ireland Senior "B" Football Championship, while he won two O'Byrne Cup medals with Laois in 1991 and 1994.

With his club Courtwood, Doyle won a Laois Junior Football Championship in 1986 and a Laois Intermediate Football Championship in 1987.

He was manager of the Laois under 21 Football team in 2005 and of the Laois minor football team in 2012 and 2013.
