= Gerry Garland =

Irish Gaelic footballer

Sport
- Sport: Gaelic football
Club
- Years: Club
- St Mochta's
Inter-county
- Years: County
- Louth

Gerry Garland is an Irish Gaelic footballer who has played for St Mochta's and the Louth county team. He won the Louth Intermediate Football Championship in 2018.
