= John O'Connell (Gaelic footballer) =

Irish Gaelic footballer

Personal information
- Native name: Sean Ó Conaill (Irish)
- Born: Ireland
- Height: 6 ft (183 cm)

Sport
- Sport: Gaelic football
- Position: Midfield/Half Forward
Club
- Years: Club
- ? -?: Courtwood
Inter-county
- Years: County
- ?- ?: Laois

John O'Connell is a former Gaelic footballer from County Laois.

He played on the Laois senior football team in the late 1980s and early 1990s, primarily as a forward but also in midfield.

In 1991, he played on the Laois team beaten by Meath in the final of the Leinster Senior Football Championship but won an O'Byrne Cup medal with Laois earlier that year.

With his club Courtwood, he won a Laois Junior Football Championship in 1986 and a Laois Intermediate Football Championship in 1987.
