= Danny Luttrell =

Irish Gaelic footballer

Danny Luttrell is a former Gaelic football player from County Laois.

He played on the Laois senior football team in defence and was a corner back on the Laois senior team beaten in the 1968 Leinster Senior Football Championship final, with his clubmate Tommy Dunne in attack on the same day.

In 1966, he was part of the Laois team that won the Leinster Minor Football Championship and in 1969 he added a Leinster Under 21 Football Championship medal to his collection.

He assisted his home club Courtwood to victory in the Laois Junior Football Championship in 1970 and Laois Intermediate Football Championship in 1971.

In 1973, along with his fellow club men Paddy Dunne and Ned Flynn, he was part of the Laois team that won the All-Ireland Junior Football Championship, the county's first ever All-Ireland championship.
