= Karl Lenihan =

Irish Gaelic footballer and manager

Personal information
- Nickname: Sudsy
- Born: Ireland

Sport
- Sport: Gaelic football
- Position: Midfield
Clubs
- Years: Club
- ?–?: Stradbally; Courtwood; Stradbally; Portlaoise
Inter-county
- Years: County
- ?—?: Laois

Karl Lenihan is a former Gaelic footballer from County Laois.

== Playing career ==
He played on the Laois senior football during the 1970s and 1980s, primarily in midfield. During that period he was widely regarded as one of the top players in the county in his position.

He began his club football career with Stradbally before transferring to the Courtwood club, where his father Sean was manager.

He returned to his native club Stradbally and captained them to the Laois Intermediate Football Championship in 1983.

His last and most successful club spell was with Portlaoise where he won Laois Senior Football Championship titles in 1987, 1990 and 1991.

== Managerial career ==
Karl returned to one of his former clubs Courtwood where he carried out two separate spells as manager.

In 2007, he was appointed as manager of Portlaoise's senior football team, with Tom Prendergast, Paddy Fitzpatrick and George Plunkett as his selectors and he was an instant success leading The Town to their 24th Laois Senior Football Championship title.
