= Paul Lawlor =

Irish Gaelic footballer

Personal information
- Native name: Pól Ó Leathlobhair (Irish)
- Nickname: Chubby
- Born: Ireland

Sport
- Sport: Gaelic football
- Position: -
Club
- Years: Club
- ? -?: Emo
Inter-county
- Years: County
- ?- ?: Laois
Inter-county titles
- Leinster titles: 1

Paul Lawlor is a Gaelic footballer from County Laois.

Lawlor plays for the Emo club. He usually plays in the forwards for Laois and in 2003 was part of the Laois squad that won the Leinster Senior Football Championship title for the first time since 1946. Lawlor emerged on to the scene in 2000 as part of the Laois minor team and in 2003 he was part of the Laois Under 21 team. In 2017 he became Player-Manager of Emo Gaa bringing his club back to Senior status. In 2021 he became a selector with Laois Senior team.
