= Stephen Radcliffe =

Irish cricketer and British Army officer

Personal information
- Full name: Stephen Tempest Adair Radcliffe
- Born: 25 August 1904; Ballybrittas, Ireland
- Died: 25 April 1982 (aged 77); Netherbury, Dorset, England
- Batting: Right-handed
- Bowling: Right-arm medium

Domestic team information
- Years: Team
- 1925–1926: Dublin University

Career statistics
Competition	First-class
Matches	2
Runs scored	28
Batting average	7.00
100s/50s	–/–
Top score	14
Balls bowled	42
Wickets	1
Bowling average	11.00
5 wickets in innings	–
10 wickets in match	–
Best bowling	1/11
Catches/stumpings	1/–
- Source: Cricinfo, 27 October 2018

Stephen Tempest Adair Radcliffe (24 August 1904 – 25 April 1982) was an Irish first-class cricketer and British Army officer.

Born at Ballybrittas, Radcliffe studied at Trinity College, Dublin. While studying at Trinity, he was a member of the Dublin University Cricket Club. He accompanied the club on its tours to England in 1925 and 1926, playing in two first-class fixtures, both against Northamptonshire at Northampton. He scored 28 runs in these two matches, as well as taking one wicket.

He presumably moved to England after this, as he enlisted into the British Army in July 1929. He obtained the rank of second lieutenant in the Royal Engineers in November 1929. He was promoted to lieutenant in February 1932. In August 1938, he was promoted to captain. He served in World War II, following the war he was promoted to major in February 1946. In March 1951, he gained the rank of lieutenant colonel. He retired from the Royal Engineers in November 1958, with the rank of lieutenant colonel. Having been placed on the reserve list, his age exceeded this in February 1962. He died at Netherbury in Dorset in April 1982.
