= Courtwood GAA =

Gaelic football club in County Laois, Ireland

Courtwood
- Coill na Cúirte
- Founded: 1962
- County: Laois
- Nickname: The Wood
- Colours: White with black stripes
- Grounds: Kilbracken
- Coordinates: 53°06′14.11″N 7°04′59.89″W

Playing kits
Standard colours

Courtwood GAA (Irish: Cumann Luthchleas Gael Coill na Cúirte) is a Gaelic Athletic Association gaelic football club, located in the north east corner of County Laois in Ireland. The club is located in the eastern half of Emo parish with a small catchment area south of the village of Ballybrittas and mainly covered by the local school Rath NS.

The locality is bordered on one side by County Kildare and by three neighbouring clubs in Laois: Annanough, O'Dempsey's and Emo.

At adult level, the club is a football club only, although a period in the 2000s saw Courtwood play hurling also. Courtwood currently field football teams at Senior and junior C.

== History ==
Gaelic football has been played in the area since the foundation of the GAA in 1884 with evidence of the first club named Courtwood existing as early as 1888 and competing in the earliest known Laois Senior Football Championships. The 1892 Laois Senior Football Championship final was actually played in Courtwood.

The early 1900s saw the original Courtwood club fade from existence to be replaced in the area by a club named Ballybrittas which in turn was replaced by the Jamestown club.

The current Courtwood club was reformed in 1962 and played its first game on 1 April 1962 beating Wolfhill by 3-5 to 0-1. Previous to this, players from the locality played with either the Jamestown or Annanough clubs.

Courtwood has won the Laois Junior Football Championship three times (1970, 1986 and 2014) and the Laois Intermediate Football Championship three times (1971, 1987 and 2018) and won three league titles Laois All-County Football League Division Three in 2015 and Division Two in 2018 and 2023. In 2006, Courtwood's second team won the Laois Junior "C" Football Championship.

At underage level, Courtwood have successfully combined with Emo on a number of occasions to win county titles. Emo won the Laois Minor Football Championship in 1964 and 1965 and the Laois Under 21 Football Championship in 1966 and 1967, with players from Courtwood playing on the winning teams.

The two clubs also combined to win the Under 21 title again in 1989 and 1990 as Courtwood/Emo and returned to win the Under 21 B title again in 2012.

Courtwood as a separate entity won the 2003 Laois Minor "B" Football Championship and Emo/Courtwood returned to the county roll of honour in 2008 winning the Laois Minor "B" Football Championship, having lost out in the 2007 final of the same competition. In 2011 and 2012, an Emo, Courtwood and The Rock minor combination won two Laois Minor "B" Football Championships and two Laois Minor Football League B titles.

In 2016, Emo, Courtwood and The Rock again joined forces at minor level and won the Laois Minor Football Championship. 2019 then saw Emo/Courtwood win another minor championship with the under 20 title following later in the year under the Courtwood/Emo banner Captained by Rory Doyle and Niall Gorman.

At the younger age levels St Paul's has been quite successful in recent years. The under 14 team won the county Féile in 2013 and went on to win the county championship and retain the title in 2014. They also won the under 16 championship in 2015, 2016 and 2017.

== Juvenile setup ==
Juvenile football and hurling affairs are catered for by St Pauls Juvenile GAA club, an amalgamation with fellow parishioners, Emo. Courtwood also amalgamate with Emo at minor (under 17) and under 20 level.

== Achievements ==
- Laois Intermediate Football Championship (3) 1971, 1987, 2018
- Laois Junior Football Championships (3) 1970, 1986, 2014
- Laois Junior C Football Championship (2) 2006, 2026
- Laois All-County Football League Div. 1: (1) 2026
- Laois All-County Football League Div. 2: (2) 2018, 2023
- Laois All-County Football League Div. 3: (1) 2015
- Laois All-County Football League Div. 7: (1) 2025
- Laois Under-21 Football Championship (2) 1989 (with Emo), 1990 (with Emo)
- Laois Under-20 Football Championship (1) 2019 (with Emo)
- Laois Under-21 B Football Championship (2) 2012 (with Emo) and 2005
- Laois Under-20 B Football Championship (1) 2025 (with Emo)
- Laois Minor Football Championship (2) 2016 (with Emo and The Rock), 2019 (with Emo)
- Laois Minor B Football Championship (9) 1987, 1989, 1992, 2008, 2022, 2025 (all with Emo), 2011 and 2012 (with Emo and The Rock), 2003
- Laois Minor B Football League (3) 2011 and 2012 (with Emo and The Rock), 2025 (with Emo)

== Famous players and members ==
Courtwood is the home club of Fergal Byron, the 2003 All-Star goalkeeper who was also instrumental in Laois's 2003 Leinster SFC triumph. He was joined in 2007 on the Laois senior panel by Niall Donoher, a minor and under 21 star with Laois.

George Doyle and John O'Connell both played senior football with Laois in the 1990s while Danny Luttrell and Tommy Dunne were on the Laois team beaten in the Leinster SFC final in 1968.

In 2014, former Courtwood player Eddie Kinsella refereed the All-Ireland Senior Football Championship final between Kerry and Donegal, with his four umpires Alan O'Halloran, Pat O'Connell, Arthur O'Connor and Niall Murphy also all club members.

In recent years, Courtwood have supplied a number of players to Laois senior, under 20/21 and minor football teams including Luke Doyle, Mark O'Halloran, Conor Hogan, Danny Luttrell, Alan Kinsella, Matthew Byron, Niall Dunne, Sean O'Flynn, Seth Burns Mooney, Paul O'Flynn, Nathan Little, Sam Krebs, Adam O'Halloran, Cian Doyle, Collins Ugochukwu, Ryan Little, Dan Boland, Rob Tyrrell, Eoghan Slattery and Tadhg Slattery.

The first ever Laois team to win an All-Ireland football title was the 1973 junior team and Courtwood players Danny Luttrell, Paddy Dunne and Ned Flynn all played on that winning team.

Offaly All-Ireland Senior Football Championship winning medallist in 1971 and 1972, Larry Coughlan, played for Courtwood for a period in the mid 1970s beginning in April 1974.

== Players ==
- Fergal Byron
- Larry Coughlan
- Niall Donoher
- George Doyle
- Tommy Dunne
- Danny Luttrell
- John O'Connell
- Sean O'Flynn

== Managers ==
2025-26	Mark Bates
2024	Ryan van Haeften
2023	Barry Weldon
2021-22	Eddie Kinsella
2020	Gary Kavanagh
2017–19	Eddie Kinsella
2016	Fergal Byron
2014–15	Gerry O'Flaherty
2012–2013	John Joe O'Connell
2011	Mick Behan
2010	Richie Connor
2009	George Doyle and Mick Behan (joint)
2008	George Doyle
2007	John Strong
2004–2006	Mick Behan
2003	Karl Lenihan
2001–2002	George Doyle
2000	Tom Kinsella
1998–1999	Tommy Dunne
1997	Larry Swayne
1996	Martin Dunne
1995	Danny Luttrell
1993–1994	Karl Lenihan
1992	Brian Lawlor
1991	Martin Dunne
1989–90	Seamus Lawlor
1988	Tom Kinsella
1986–1987	Brian Lawlor
1984–1985	Mick Behan (Carlow)
