= Emo GAA =

GAA club in Emo, County Laois, Ireland

Emo
- Ioma
- Founded: 1950
- County: Laois
- Colours: White and Red
- Grounds: Emo Gaa
- Coordinates: 53°05′56.84″N 7°12′26.91″W

Playing kits
Standard colours

Senior Club Championships
	All Ireland	Leinster champions	Laois champions
Football:	-	-	1

Emo GAA is a Gaelic Athletic Association gaelic football club in Emo, County Laois, Ireland.

== History ==
The club was founded in the 1950s and the club colors are white with a red hoop.

Their previous notable players include Gabriel Lawlor, Mick Lawlor and Paddy Brophy. Paddy Brophy, Ger Lawlor, and Martin Corcorcan were members of the 1986 League winning panel. On the day, Paddy played with a torn hamstring.

Gabriel Lawlor was manager of the first Laois minor team to win an All-Ireland title, starting the great under-age success of the late nineties and early two thousands.Mick Lawlor and Paul Lawlor were members of the 2003 Leinster winning panel with Gabriel Lawlor as selector.

Emo won their only Laois Senior Football Championship title in 1972 when Paddy Lawlor captained his team to victory over Graiguecullen. Emo won the Laois Junior Football Championship in 1962, the Laois Intermediate Football Championship in 1964, 2012 and 2017, the Laois Minor Football Championship in 1964, 1965 and 2016 and the Laois Under 21 Football Championship in 1966 and 1967.

Players from the other club in the parish Courtwood played on the minor and Under 21 winning teams and the two clubs also combined to win the Under 21 title again in 1989 and 1990 as Courtwood/Emo.

The juvenile club, known as St Paul's, is a combination of the two local clubs, Emo and Courtwood. The under 14 team won the county Féile in 2013 and went on to win the county championship and retain the title in 2014. They also won the under 16 championship in 2015, 2016 and 2017. The club has had many successes at other levels as well.

Emo/Courtwood returned to the county roll of honour in 2008 winning the Laois Minor "B" Football Championship, having lost out in the 2007 final of the same competition

Emo won the Laois Intermediate Football Championship in 2012 and played in the Leinster Intermediate Championship but were defeated by O'Connell's in O'Moore Park.

== Achievements ==
- Laois Senior Football Championship: (1) 1972
- Laois Intermediate Football Championship (3) 1964, 2012, 2017
- Laois Junior Football Championships (1) 1962
- Laois Minor Football Championship (4) 1964, 1965, 2016, 2019 (with Courtwood and The Rock)
- Laois Under-21 Football Championship (4) 1966, 1967, 1989 (with Courtwood), 1990 (with Courtwood)
- Laois Minor B Football Championship (3) 2008, 2022, 2025 (with Courtwood)
- Laois All-County Football League Div. 1: (2) 1972, 2005
- Laois All-County Football League Div. 2: (2) 2000, 2009
- Laois All-County Football League Div. 5: (2) 2006, 2015

== Notable players ==
- Darren Strong
- Paul Lawlor
- Mick Lawlor (Gaelic footballer)
