= Darren Strong =

Irish Gaelic footballer

Personal information
- Born: 4 July 1985 (age 41) Portlaoise, Ireland
- Height: 1.83 m (6 ft 0 in)

Sport
- Sport: Gaelic Football
- Position: Right half back
Club
- Years: Club
- 2002-: Emo
Inter-county
- Years: County
- 2005-: Laois

Darren Strong (born 4 July 1985) is a Gaelic footballer from County Laois.
