= Fergal Byron =

Irish Gaelic footballer

Personal information
- Native name: Fergal Ó Beirn (Irish)
- Nickname: the fonze
- Born: 29 October 1974 (age 52) County Laois
- Height: 6" 3in

Sport
- Sport: GAA
- Position: Goalkeeper
Club
- Years: Club
- Courtwood
Club titles
- Laois titles: 0
- Leinster titles: 0
Inter-county
Years	County	Apps (scores)
1997-2007	Laois	43 (1-1)
Inter-county titles
- Leinster titles: 1
- All-Irelands: 0
- All Stars: 1

Fergal Byron is a former Gaelic footballer for Laois from Ballybrittas.

A goalkeeper, he won a Leinster Senior Football Championship medal with Laois in 2003 and picked up an All-Star award in the same year. He also won a Leinster Under 21 Football medal as a corner back with Laois in 1994.

In 2005, he won an Interprovincial Championship medal with his province Leinster.

In November 2007, he announced his retirement from the inter county game.

He was appointed Coaching and Games Officer for Laois GAA in 2017.
