= John Bingham (Gaelic footballer) =

Irish Gaelic footballer

Sport
- Sport: Gaelic football
- Position: Full-back
Clubs
- Years: Club
- 2009-2019 2020-: St Mary's; John Mitchels
Inter-county
- Years: County
- 2013-2018: Louth

John Bingham is an Irish Gaelic footballer who plays in defence for the John Mitchels club and is a former inter-county player with the Louth team.

He made his first championship start against Laois in the 2013 Leinster Senior Football Championship, a game which his county won, with Bingham scoring a point despite starting the game at full-back.

He was a regular starter for his county under managers Aidan O'Rourke and Colin Kelly, winning a National League Division 4 medal in 2016. His most recent championship appearance for Louth came in a 2017 qualifier defeat to Longford.

At club level, he lined out for St Mary's in their 2016 Louth Senior Football Championship final loss to Seán O'Mahony's. He was part of two Paddy Sheelan Cup successes for the Ardee side, in 2016 and 2018. He also played for Donegal Boston while travelling in the USA during 2019.

Bingham transferred to the John Mitchels club in 2020 and featured in their run to the 2021 Louth Junior Championship final, which culminated in a defeat to Glen Emmets.

Outside of Gaelic football, Bingham has played soccer for his local amateur side Ardee Celtic and ran for Ardee and District Athletic Club.
