= Breaking Loose (album) =

Studio album by Helix
- Released: 1979
- Recorded: 1979
- Studio: Springfield Sound (Aylmer, Ontario); Maxim Canada (Carlingford, Ontario)
- Genre: Hard rock; heavy metal
- Length: 36:09
- Label: H&S
- Producer: R.A. "Bob" Morten; Helix

Helix chronology
Breaking Loose (1979)	White Lace & Black Leather (1981)

Singles from Breaking Loose
- 1. "Don't Hide Your Love" Released: 1979; 2. "Billy Oxygen" Released: 1979

Breaking Loose is the debut studio album by Canadian hard rock band Helix. Recorded primarily at Springfield Sound in Aylmer, Ontario with producer R.A. "Bob" Morten, it was released in 1979 on the band's own label H&S Records. The album features all original material, written by the band's frontman Brian Vollmer, and two guitarists Paul Hackman and Brent Doerner. It was supported by the release of Hackman's "Don't Hide Your Love" and Doerner's "Billy Oxygen" as singles.

Material for Breaking Loose was recorded over a two-week period in 1979 and featured contributions from a range of guest performers, including up-and-coming vocalist Lydia Taylor, session guitarist Peter Follett, and keyboardist Joel Wideman. Although the album did not chart, it received significant radio airplay in Canada and the United States which led to several touring and promotional opportunities. Breaking Loose was reissued for its 40th anniversary in 2019 with two bonus tracks.

== Background ==
After five years of touring with various lineups, Helix recorded its debut album in 1979, funded by money raised by manager Bill Seip. Describing the recording process in 2009, the band's lead vocalist Brian Vollmer recalled that Breaking Loose was tracked over a period of two weeks using 24-track 2-inch tape, during which time the band "ate, slept, [and] lived at the studio". The album was independently released on the group's own label H&S Records, which stands for "Helix & Seip". According to Billboard magazine, Breaking Loose sold approximately 10,000 units after its initial pressing.

"Don't Hide Your Love", written by guitarist Paul Hackman, was released as the lead single from Breaking Loose. This was followed by a second single, "Billy Oxygen", which was written and sung by guitarist Brian Doerner. The latter track is credited with gaining Helix early Canadian airplay. Outside of Canada, radio host Joe Anthony of San Antonio, Texas station KISS FM began playing "You're a Woman Now" which gave the band an opportunity to perform in the US for the first time. This resulted in a four-date tour of the state, after which they "returned to Canada [and] were treated as stars by their rabid following", leading to their first TV interview.

Following its initial pressings on LP record, Breaking Loose was released on compact disc for the first time as one half of the 1991 compilation The Early Years, alongside 1981 follow-up White Lace & Black Leather. After several subsequent limited-run re-releases, the album was remastered and reissued in 2019 to mark its 40th anniversary (White Lace & Black Leather was also remastered and reissued at the same time). The new version contains two previously unreleased bonus tracks: "Let Me Take You Dancin'", which was reportedly the first song the band ever recorded; and "Sidewalk Sally", the first song to be co-written by Vollmer and Doerner.

== Reception ==
Professional ratings
Review scores
Source	Rating
AllMusic	3/5 stars
Collector's Guide to Heavy Metal	6/10

Music website AllMusic awarded Breaking Loose three out of five stars, although did not publish a written review for the album. Independent writer Mike Ladano gave it five out of five, writing that "Breaking Loose isn't metal, but what it lacks in firepower is made up for in class, ambition and natural talent. [...] Though it lacks the oomph of Helix today, it's perfectly listenable." Ladano added that "the only complaint I have about this album would be that some of the lyrics were a little weak".

Reviewing the 2019 40th anniversary expanded reissue alongside the reissue of White Lace & Black Leather, Ladano praised the albums' mastering and wrote that "These discs are the versions to get; the expanded tracklist making them musts to the collecting fan who already own them all."

== Track listing ==
No.	Title	Writer(s)	Length
1.	"I Could Never Leave"	Paul Hackman; Brian Vollmer	3:56
2.	"Don't Hide Your Love"	Hackman	3:21
3.	"Down in the City"	Vollmer	5:45
4.	"Crazy Women"	Brent Doerner	3:17
5.	"Billy Oxygen"	Doerner	4:17
6.	"Here I Go Again"	Doerner; Vollmer	3:31
7.	"You're a Woman Now"	Hackman	5:44
8.	"Wish I Could Be There"	Hackman	6:18
Total length:			36:09

40th anniversary reissue bonus tracks
No.	Title	Writer(s)	Length
9.	"Let Me Take You Dancin'"	David Lodge	3:29
10.	"Sidewalk Sally"	Doerner; Vollmer	3:39
Total length:			44:02

== Personnel ==
Helix

- Brian Vollmer – lead vocals (all except "Billy Oxygen"), production
- Brent Doener – lead guitars, 12-string electric & acoustic guitars; vocals and bass on "Billy Oxygen"; production
- Paul Hackman – lead guitars, acoustic guitars, backing vocals, production
- Keith "Bert" Zurbrigg – bass, backing vocals, production
- Brian Doerner – drums, backing vocals, production

Guest musicians

- Peter Follet – guitar
- Joel Wideman – keyboards
- Wayne Smith – percussion
- Lydia Taylor – backing vocals
- Valerie Hudson – backing vocals
- Doug Varty – backing vocals
- Richard Zuiceuicz – backing vocals
- "Dennis" – backing vocals

Additional personnel

- R.A. "Bob" Morten – production
- Declan O'Doherty – engineering
- Dan Donovan – engineering assistance
- Bob Doble – engineering (track 5)
- George Marino – mastering
- Robert Yendt – art direction
- Roger Psutka – photography
- Rose Janovich – photography
