= Larry Coughlan =

Offaly Gaelic footballer

Personal information
- Born: 1941 Geashill, County Offaly
- Died: 13 September 2009 Newbridge, County Kildare

Sport
- Sport: Gaelic football
- Position: Left corner-back or midfield
Clubs
- Years: Club
- ? ?–1973 1974–1978: Raheen; Eadestown; Courtwood
Inter-county
Years	County	Apps (scores)
1960–1973	Offaly	70
Inter-county titles
- Leinster titles: 5
- All-Irelands: 2
- NFL: 0
- All Stars: 0

Larry Coughlan (1941 – 13 September 2009) was an Irish Gaelic footballer who played for his local club Raheen, Eadestown in Kildare and Courtwood in Laois, as well as for the Offaly senior team from 1960 until 1973.

Born in Geashill, County Offaly, Coughlan had a lengthy inter-county career. He first came to notice as a 19-year-old substitute in 1960, on the first Offaly team to win a Leinster SFC title. Coughlan progressed to win All-Ireland SFC medals in 1971 and 1972, when Offaly defeated Galway and Kerry. He didn't play in the 1971 final, but did win a medal as a substitute and was a key figure at left corner-back in the following year's success.
