= Tommy Dunne (Gaelic footballer) =

Irish Gaelic footballer

Tommy Dunne was a Gaelic football player from County Laois.

He played on the Laois senior football team in attack and played at centre forward on the Laois senior team beaten in the 1968 Leinster Senior Football Championship final, with his clubmate Danny Luttrell in defence on the same day.

He assisted his home club Courtwood to victory in the Laois Junior Football Championship in 1970 and Laois Intermediate Football Championship in 1971 and was also part of the club team that repeated the junior and intermediate double in 1986 and 1987.
