= Darren McMahon =

Irish Gaelic footballer

Sport
- Sport: Gaelic football
- Position: Midfielder
Club
- Years: Club
- St Mochta's
Inter-county
- Years: County
- Louth

Darren McMahon is an Irish Gaelic footballer who has played as a midfielder for St Mochta's and has also played for the Louth county team. He captained St Mochta's to the 2018 Louth Intermediate Football Championship. Then he followed this up by captaining St Mochta's to the 2023 Louth Senior Football Championship title.
