= Mick Lawlor (Gaelic footballer) =

Personal information
- Native name: Micheál Ó Leathlobhair (Irish)
- Nickname: Micky Lawlor
- Born: Ireland

Sport
- Sport: Gaelic football
- Position: Forward
Club
- Years: Club
- ? -?: Emo
Inter-county
- Years: County
- ?- ?: Laois
Inter-county titles
- Leinster titles: 1

Mick Lawlor is a Gaelic footballer from County Laois.

He played for Laois senior football team, primarily in attack, throughout the 1990s and into the early 2000s.

In 1991, he played on the Laois team beaten by Meath in the final of the Leinster Senior Football Championship but 12 years later (in 2003) he was part of the Laois team that ended a 57-year wait for the title. He also won O'Byrne Cup medals in 1991 and 1994.

As of 2017, he was chairman of his home club, Emo.
