= Declan Byrne (Gaelic footballer) =

Louth Gaelic footballer

Personal information
- Nickname: Decky

Sport
- Sport: Gaelic football
Club
- Years: Club
- St Mochta's
Inter-county
- Years: County
- Louth

Declan Byrne is an Irish Gaelic footballer who has played in various positions for St Mochta's and the Louth county team.

He first played for Louth in the 2000s when Eamonn McEneaney managed, though his early career was hampered by a broken ankle. He has been a defender, midfielder, playmaker, attacker and - inspired by James Califf - even a goalkeeper when Mickey Harte managed Louth.

Byrne played for Louth in the 2010 Leinster Senior Football Championship final. He was suspended for Louth's 2011 National League Division 3 final victory over Westmeath. He continued his involvement with Louth's panel up until 2023.

Married, he is from Louth, County Louth. As of 2026, he was analysing matches with LMFM and working as a coach of the Louth U20s. He is the elder brother of Ciarán.
