= Carlingford, Ontario =

Community in Ontario, Canada

Coordinates: 43°22′57″N 81°09′07″W

Carlingford in Ontario

Carlingford is a community in Southwestern Ontario, Canada. It is located about 12 km due west of Stratford, and 20 km due north of St. Marys.

The name is derived from Carlingford, Ireland, where Thomas D'Arcy McGee, a father of Canadian confederation, was born.
