= Ballybrittas =

Village in County Laois, Ireland

Ballybrittas Baile Briotáis
- Village
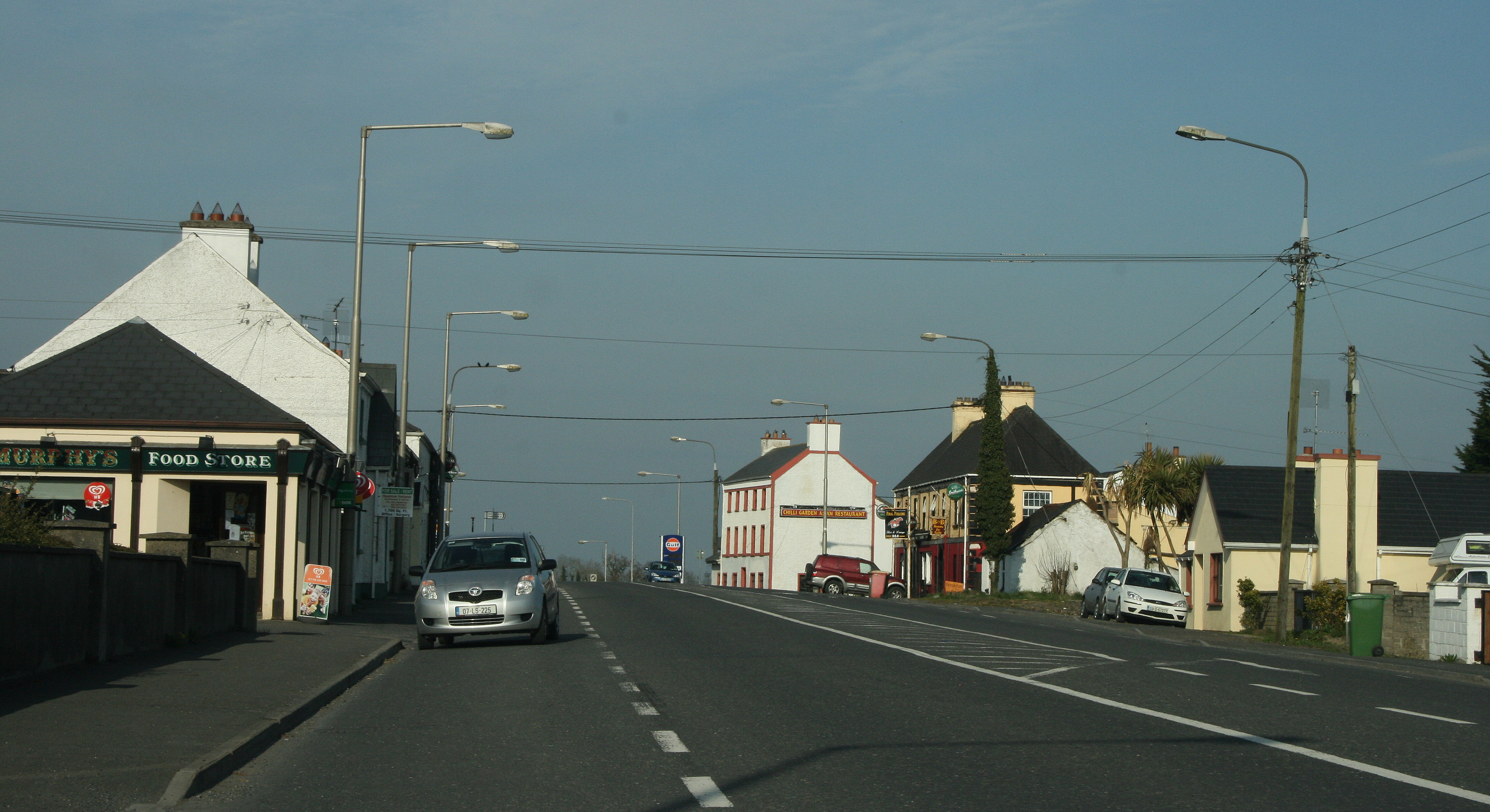
- View of Ballybrittas from the southwest (R445)

- Location in Ireland
- Coordinates: 53°06′35″N 7°08′08″W
- Country: Ireland
- Province: Leinster
- County: County Laois

Population (2016)
  - Total: 388
- Time zone: UTC+0 (WET)
  - Summer (DST): UTC-1 (IST (WEST))

Ballybrittas (Irish: Baile Briotáis, meaning 'town of the palisade', IPA:[ˈbˠalʲəˈbʲɾʲɪt̪ˠaːʃ]) is a small village in the northeast of County Laois, Ireland situated on the R445 about 5 km SW of Monasterevin, County Kildare. Formerly on the N7 Dublin - Limerick road, the village is now bypassed by the M7 motorway.

== Amenities ==
Businesses in the village include a pub, a service station, and a number of small businesses.

The local schools and churches are nearby in Rath and Killenard. A Church of Ireland church just outside the village is known as Rathdaire.The local Gaelic Athletic Association club Courtwood is nearby.

== Notable people ==
- Jack Adair (1823–1885), Scots-Irish businessman and landowner,
- Fergal Byron (born 1974), Laois Gaelic footballer
- Charlotte Dease (1873-1953), author
- Edmund Dease (1829-1904), Irish politician
- Robert Johnson (1745-1833) Irish judge and pamphleteer
- Eddie Kinsella (born 1966), Gaelic football referee
- James Lalor (1829-1922), Australian politician
- Stephen Radcliffe (1904-1982), first-class cricketer and British Army officer

== See also ==
- List of towns and villages in Ireland
