= Niall Donoher =

Irish Gaelic footballer

Personal information
- Native name: Níall Ó Danachair (Irish)
- Born: 10 March 1986 (age 40) Portlaoise, Ireland
- Height: 1.78 m (5 ft 10 in)

Sport
- Sport: Gaelic Football
- Position: Right Half Forward
Club
- Years: Club
- 2002-: Courtwood
Inter-county
- Years: County
- 2005-2018: Laois

Niall Donoher (born 10 March 1986) is a Gaelic footballer from County Laois. Niall has been playing football since 2002 in the minor and major games playing mostly in the forward position. He currently advocates for finding cures to rare genetic diseases.

== Biography ==
Nial Donoher was born in Portlaoise, Ireland on 10 March 1986. He is married to Aisling and have a son named Dan who at the age of one was diagnosed with a rare genetic neuromuscular disease. Niall is an active advocate for finding and curing rare diseases.

== Football career ==
Nial started his junior football career at the age of 13.

He usually played in attack for Laois for whom he played at senior level from 2005 until 2018 and in 2003 was part of the Laois team that won the All-Ireland Minor Football Championship title for the first time since 1997.

In 2004, he was part of the minor team which won the Leinster Minor Football Championship.

In 2006 and again in 2007, Niall was part of the Laois team that won the Leinster U21 Football Championship.

At club level, Niall usually lines out as a forward with Courtwood and was part of their Laois Junior Football Championship winning team in 2014 and Laois Intermediate Football Championship winning team in 2018.

== Honours ==
- 1 All-Ireland Minor Football Championship 2003
- 1 Leinster Minor Football Championship 2004
- 2 Leinster Under-21 Football Championship 2006, 2007
- 1 National Football League Division Four 2018
- 1 O'Byrne Cup 2005
- 1 Laois Junior Football Championship 2014
- 1 Laois Intermediate Football Championship 2018
- 1 Laois All-County Football League Division Three 2015
- 2 Laois All-County Football League Division Two 2018, 2023
- 1 Laois Minor Football Championship "B" 2003
