= Redmayne =

Surname

Redmayne is an English surname. Notable people with the surname include:

- Andrew Redmayne (born 1989), Australian football (soccer) player
- Arthur Redmayne (1857–1933), English-born New Zealand cricketer who played for Canterbury
- Eddie Redmayne (born 1982), English actor
- George Redmayne Murray (1865–1939), English physician who pioneered in the treatment of endocrine disorders
- Georgia Redmayne (born 1993), Australian cricketer
- Henry Redmayne Holme (1839–1891), Anglican bishop in the late 19th century
- Martin Redmayne, Baron Redmayne (1910–1983), British Conservative politician
- Nicholas Redmayne (1938–2008), British stockbroker
- Richard Redmayne (1865–1955), British civil and mining engineer
- Suze Redmayne (born 1965 or 1966), a New Zealand politician

== See also ==
- Redmayne Baronets of Rushcliffe in the County of Nottingham, a title in the Baronetage of the United Kingdom
- Yealand Redmayne, village and civil parish in the English county of Lancashire
- Radman (disambiguation)
- Readman
- Redman (disambiguation)
- Redmann
- Redmen (disambiguation)
- Redmine
- Redmon (disambiguation)
- Redmain (disambiguation)
