= Desmond Patton =

Irish Anglican archdeacon (1912-2003)

Desmond Hilton Patton (1912 – 2 November 2003) was the Archdeacon of Ossory and Leighlin from 1962 until 1976.

Fahy was educated at Trinity College, Dublin and ordained in 1937. He began his career with curacies at Killermogh, Wexford and Mothel. He held Incumbencies in Ardoyne (Carlow), Clonenagh and Carlow.

He died on 2 November 2003.
