= List of townlands of County Laois =

There are approximately 1,162 townlands in County Laois, Ireland. A plain version of this list showing townland names only is also available for easy alphabetical navigation and convenient overview.

Duplicate names occur where there is more than one townland with the same name in the county. Names marked in bold typeface are towns and villages, and the word Town appears for those entries in the Acres column.

Townland	Acres	Barony	Civil parish	Poor law union
**Abbeyleix**	Town	Cullenagh	Abbeyleix	Abbeyleix
Abbeyleix Demesne	1,321	Cullenagh	Abbeyleix	Abbeyleix
Acragar	647	Portnahinch	Ardea	Mountmellick
Addergoole	103	Clarmallagh	Aghmacart	Abbeyleix
Afoley	122	Tinnahinch	Rearymore	Mountmellick
Aghaboe	308	Clarmallagh	Aghaboe	Donaghmore
Aghadreen	516	Cullenagh	Fossy or Timahoe	Abbeyleix
Aghafin	238	Upperwoods	Offerlane	Abbeyleix
Aghamaddock	274	Stradbally	Stradbally	Athy
Aghamafir	174	Ballyadams	Rathaspick	Athy
Aghamore	71	Upperwoods	Offerlane	Mountmellick
Aghamore (or Ashbrook)	22	Tinnahinch	Kilmanman	Mountmellick
Aghanure	401	Ballyadams	Killabban	Athy
Aghaterry	90	Slievemargy	Killabban	Carlow
Aghcross	150	Slievemargy	Killabban	Carlow
Aghduff	159	Upperwoods	Offerlane	Mountmellick
Aghmacart	481	Clarmallagh	Aghmacart	Abbeyleix
Aghnacross	397	Cullenagh	Dysartgallen	Abbeyleix
Aghnaharna (or Summerhill)	134	Maryborough East	Borris	Mountmellick
Aghnahily	204	Maryborough East	Dysartenos	Mountmellick
Aghnahily Bog	49	Maryborough East	Dysartenos	Mountmellick
Aghoney	559	Cullenagh	Fossy or Timahoe	Abbeyleix
Aharney	608	Clarmallagh	Aharney	Abbeyleix
Akip	302	Clandonagh	Rathdowney	Donaghmore
Altavilla	37	Upperwoods	Offerlane	Mountmellick
Anatrim	5	Upperwoods	Offerlane	Mountmellick
Annagh	202	Upperwoods	Offerlane	Mountmellick
Anneville	174	Slievemargy	Shrule	Carlow
Anster	40	Clarmallagh	Aghaboe	Abbeyleix
Archerstown	734	Clarmallagh	Aharney	Abbeyleix
Ardateggle	1,274	Slievemargy	Killeshin	Carlow
Ardlea	157	Maryborough West	Clonenagh and Clonagheen	Abbeyleix
Ardough (or Huntspark)	647	Slievemargy	Killabban	Carlow
Ardvarney	21	Clandonagh	Aghaboe	Donaghmore
**Arless**	Town	Slievemargy	Killabban	Carlow
Ashbrook (or Aghamore)	22	Tinnahinch	Kilmanman	Mountmellick
Ashfield	1,045	Slievemargy	Killabban	Carlow
Aughans	55	Tinnahinch	Castlebrack	Mountmellick
Avoley	320	Tinnahinch	Rosenallis	Mountmellick
Badgerhill	166	Upperwoods	Offerlane	Mountmellick
Badgerisland	94	Upperwoods	Offerlane	Abbeyleix
Baggottspark	95	Clarmallagh	Abbeyleix	Abbeyleix
Ballagharahin	662	Clandonagh	Rathdowney	Donaghmore
Ballaghlyragh (or Nealstown)	148	Upperwoods	Offerlane	Mountmellick
Ballaghmore	172	Stradbally	Stradbally	Athy
Ballaghmore Lower	1,061	Clandonagh	Kyle	Roscrea
Ballaghmore Upper	503	Clandonagh	Kyle	Roscrea
**Ballickmoyler**	Town	Slievemargy	Killabban	Carlow
Ballickmoyler	639	Slievemargy	Killabban	Carlow
Ballickmoyler Upper	259	Slievemargy	Killabban	Carlow
Ballina	179	Maryborough East	Clonenagh and Clonagheen	Mountmellick
Ballina	43	Upperwoods	Offerlane	Mountmellick
Ballinaclogh Lower	440	Cullenagh	Fossy or Timahoe	Abbeyleix
Ballinaclogh Upper	418	Cullenagh	Fossy or Timahoe	Abbeyleix
**Ballinakill**	Town	Cullenagh	Dysartgallen	Abbeyleix
Ballinakill	174	Cullenagh	Dysartgallen	Abbeyleix
Ballinfrase	292	Clarmallagh	Erke	Donaghmore
Ballinla	337	Clandonagh	Kyle	Roscrea
Ballinlough	210	Maryborough East	Kilteale	Mountmellick
Ballinlough	134	Cullenagh	Ballyroan	Abbeyleix
Ballinrahin	204	Slievemargy	Killabban	Carlow
Ballinrally	803	Upperwoods	Offerlane	Mountmellick
Ballinree	142	Ballyadams	Tankardstown	Athy
Ballinriddery (or Knightstown)	279	Portnahinch	Ardea	Mountmellick
Ballintaggart	368	Clandonagh	Kyle	Donaghmore
Ballintaggart	87	Portnahinch	Ardea	Mountmellick
Ballinteskin	765	Stradbally	Timogue	Athy
Ballintlea	862	Ballyadams	Ballyadams	Athy
Ballintlea Lower	335	Cullenagh	Fossy or Timahoe	Abbeyleix
Ballintlea Upper	279	Cullenagh	Fossy or Timahoe	Abbeyleix
Ballintogher	604	Portnahinch	Lea	Mountmellick
Ballintubbert	510	Ballyadams	Ballyadams	Athy
Ballyadams	575	Ballyadams	Ballyadams	Athy
Ballyadding	302	Portnahinch	Lea	Mountmellick
Ballybeg	127	Ballyadams	Tankardstown	Athy
Ballyboodin	472	Clarmallagh	Aghmacart	Abbeyleix
**Ballybrittas**	Town	Portnahinch	Lea	Mountmellick
Ballybrittas	914	Portnahinch	Lea	Mountmellick
Ballybrophy	564	Clandonagh	Aghaboe	Donaghmore
Ballybuggy	537	Clandonagh	Rathdowney	Donaghmore
Ballycarnan	832	Maryborough East	Kilcolmanbane	Mountmellick
Ballycarroll	777	Maryborough East	Kilteale	Mountmellick
Ballycarroll	391	Portnahinch	Lea	Mountmellick
Ballycleary	323	Upperwoods	Offerlane	Abbeyleix
Ballyclider	191	Maryborough East	Straboe	Mountmellick
**Ballycolla**	Town	Clarmallagh	Aghaboe	Abbeyleix
Ballycolla	373	Clarmallagh	Aghaboe	Abbeyleix
Ballycolla	52	Clarmallagh	Killermogh	Abbeyleix
Ballycolla Heath	285	Clarmallagh	Killermogh	Abbeyleix
Ballycoolan	722	Stradbally	Timogue	Athy
Ballycoolid	497	Clandonagh	Donaghmore	Donaghmore
Ballycorman	213	Ballyadams	Killabban	Athy
Ballycormick	199	Maryborough West	Clonenagh and Clonagheen	Mountmellick
Ballycrossal	166	Portnahinch	Ardea	Mountmellick
Ballycuddahy	231	Clarmallagh	Aghaboe	Abbeyleix
Ballycullenbeg	599	Portnahinch	Ardea	Mountmellick
Ballydavin	102	Clarmallagh	Rathdowney	Abbeyleix
Ballydavis	934	Maryborough East	Straboe	Mountmellick
Ballyduff	509	Clandonagh	Kyle	Roscrea
Ballyduff	262	Stradbally	Moyanna	Mountmellick
Ballyduff	190	Stradbally	Curraclone	Athy
Ballyedmond	197	Clandonagh	Erke	Donaghmore
Ballyfarrell	105	Tinnahinch	Kilmanman	Mountmellick
Ballyfin	239	Maryborough West	Clonenagh and Clonagheen	Mountmellick
Ballyfin Demesne	566	Maryborough West	Clonenagh and Clonagheen	Mountmellick
Ballyfin Upper	1,757	Maryborough West	Clonenagh and Clonagheen	Mountmellick
Ballyfinnan	237	Slievemargy	Killabban	Carlow
Ballyfoyle	730	Ballyadams	Killabban	Athy
Ballygarvan Glebe	298	Clarmallagh	Aghaboe	Abbeyleix
Ballygauge Beg	341	Clarmallagh	Killermogh	Abbeyleix
Ballygauge More	319	Clarmallagh	Killermogh	Abbeyleix
Ballygeehin Lower	523	Clarmallagh	Aghaboe	Abbeyleix
Ballygeehin Upper	402	Clarmallagh	Aghaboe	Abbeyleix
Ballygillaheen	246	Tinnahinch	Rearymore	Mountmellick
Ballyglass	85	Clandonagh	Skirk	Donaghmore
Ballyglishen	158	Cullenagh	Ballyroan	Abbeyleix
Ballygormill North	137	Maryborough East	Fossy or Timahoe	Abbeyleix
Ballygormill South	257	Cullenagh	Fossy or Timahoe	Abbeyleix
Ballygowdan	84	Clarmallagh	Aghaboe	Abbeyleix
Ballyharmon	158	Slievemargy	Killeshin	Carlow
Ballyhegadon Glebe	166	Clandonagh	Donaghmore	Donaghmore
Ballyheyland	431	Cullenagh	Kilcolmanbane	Abbeyleix
Ballyheyland	112	Cullenagh	Ballyroan	Abbeyleix
Ballyhide	487	Slievemargy	Killeshin	Carlow
Ballyhinode	93	Clarmallagh	Aghaboe	Donaghmore
Ballyhorahan	207	Upperwoods	Offerlane	Mountmellick
Ballyhuppahane	1,203	Tinnahinch	Rosenallis	Mountmellick
Ballykeally	768	Clarmallagh	Aghmacart	Abbeyleix
Ballykeally	48	Clarmallagh	Aharney	Abbeyleix
Ballykeevan	81	Clandonagh	Aghaboe	Donaghmore
Ballykenneen Lower	329	Tinnahinch	Kilmanman	Mountmellick
Ballykenneen Upper	261	Tinnahinch	Kilmanman	Mountmellick
Ballykilcavan	296	Stradbally	Curraclone	Athy
Ballykillane	447	Portnahinch	Coolbanagher	Mountmellick
Ballykillen	160	Slievemargy	Killeshin	Carlow
Ballyking	192	Cullenagh	Ballyroan	Abbeyleix
Ballyknockan	558	Maryborough East	Kilcolmanbane	Mountmellick
Ballylehane Lower	812	Ballyadams	Killabban	Carlow
Ballylehane Upper	832	Ballyadams	Killabban	Carlow
Ballylusk	410	Maryborough West	Clonenagh and Clonagheen	Mountmellick
**Ballylynan**	Town	Ballyadams	Killabban	Athy
Ballylynan	585	Ballyadams	Killabban	Athy
Ballymackan	284	Maryborough East	Straboe	Mountmellick
Ballymacrory	39	Tinnahinch	Rearymore	Mountmellick
Ballymaddock	689	Stradbally	Kilteale	Athy
Ballymaddock	452	Cullenagh	Abbeyleix	Abbeyleix
Ballymanus	549	Stradbally	Curraclone	Athy
Ballymeelish	228	Clandonagh	Skirk	Donaghmore
Ballymooney	337	Maryborough East	Straboe	Mountmellick
Ballymorris	904	Portnahinch	Lea	Mountmellick
Ballymoyle	175	Tinnahinch	Rosenallis	Mountmellick
Ballymullen	1,003	Cullenagh	Abbeyleix	Abbeyleix
Ballymullen (Stubber)	75	Clandonagh	Rathdowney	Donaghmore
Ballymullen (Warrensford)	54	Clandonagh	Rathdowney	Donaghmore
Ballynafunshin	64	Clarmallagh	Rosconnell	Abbeyleix
Ballynafunshin	38	Clarmallagh	Attanagh	Abbeyleix
Ballynagall	717	Slievemargy	Killabban	Carlow
Ballynagarr	257	Ballyadams	Killabban	Athy
Ballynahimmy	498	Tinnahinch	Kilmanman	Mountmellick
Ballynahown	369	Tinnahinch	Kilmanman	Mountmellick
Ballynakill	688	Slievemargy	Killabban	Carlow
Ballynakill	139	Clandonagh	Rathdowney	Donaghmore
Ballynakill	130	Tinnahinch	Kilmanman	Mountmellick
Ballynalug	1,327	Tinnahinch	Rearymore	Mountmellick
Ballynamuddagh	444	Maryborough West	Clonenagh and Clonagheen	Abbeyleix
Ballynevin	267	Clarmallagh	Aghmacart	Abbeyleix
Ballynowlan	221	Stradbally	Moyanna	Athy
Ballyowen	99	Clarmallagh	Aghaboe	Abbeyleix
Ballypickas Lower (or Bernardsgrove)	207	Cullenagh	Ballyroan	Abbeyleix
Ballypickas Upper	297	Cullenagh	Ballyroan	Abbeyleix
Ballyprior	250	Stradbally	Timogue	Athy
Ballyquaid Glebe	203	Clandonagh	Skirk	Donaghmore
Ballyreilly	260	Clandonagh	Aghaboe	Donaghmore
Ballyrider	488	Stradbally	Moyanna	Athy
**Ballyroan**	Town	Cullenagh	Ballyroan	Abbeyleix
Ballyroan	1,335	Cullenagh	Ballyroan	Abbeyleix
Ballyroan	167	Maryborough East	Straboe	Mountmellick
Ballyruin	439	Cullenagh	Ballyroan	Abbeyleix
Ballyshaneduff (or The Derries)	618	Portnahinch	Lea	Mountmellick
Ballytarsna	667	Upperwoods	Offerlane	Abbeyleix
Ballytarsna	465	Cullenagh	Abbeyleix	Abbeyleix
Ballytegan	192	Maryborough East	Borris	Mountmellick
Ballyteigeduff (or Jamestown)	699	Portnahinch	Lea	Mountmellick
Ballythomas	217	Stradbally	Kilteale	Mountmellick
Ballyvoghlaun (or Middlemount)	434	Clarmallagh	Coolkerry	Donaghmore
Barkmill	250	Maryborough West	Clonenagh and Clonagheen	Mountmellick
Barnaboy	265	Clandonagh	Kyle	Roscrea
Barnadarrig	310	Maryborough West	Clonenagh and Clonagheen	Abbeyleix
Barnasallagh	146	Clandonagh	Aghaboe	Donaghmore
Barny and Belady	264	Clandonagh	Rathdowney	Donaghmore
Barrackquarter (or Ross)	160	Clarmallagh	Aghmacart	Abbeyleix
Barradoos	415	Tinnahinch	Kilmanman	Mountmellick
Barrahill	294	Clandonagh	Rathdowney	Donaghmore
Barrawinga	188	Clandonagh	Rathdowney	Donaghmore
Barrowhouse	616	Ballyadams	Tankardstown	Athy
Baunaghra	1,045	Clandonagh	Erke	Donaghmore
Baunbrack	63	Clarmallagh	Aghaboe	Donaghmore
Baunoge	91	Clarmallagh	Aghaboe	Donaghmore
Baunogemeely	586	Cullenagh	Fossy or Timahoe	Abbeyleix
Baunreagh	1,834	Upperwoods	Offerlane	Mountmellick
Baunree	111	Cullenagh	Fossy or Timahoe	Abbeyleix
Baunree	90	Cullenagh	Ballyroan	Abbeyleix
Bauteogue	159	Stradbally	Dysartenos	Athy
Bawn	338	Stradbally	Curraclone	Athy
Bawnaree	178	Maryborough West	Clonenagh and Clonagheen	Abbeyleix
Bealady and Barny	264	Clandonagh	Rathdowney	Donaghmore
Beckfield	267	Clandonagh	Rathdowney	Donaghmore
Beckfield North	5	Clandonagh	Bordwell	Donaghmore
Beckfield South	4	Clandonagh	Bordwell	Donaghmore
Beladd	118	Maryborough East	Borris	Mountmellick
Beladd	109	Maryborough East	Straboe	Mountmellick
Belin	257	Portnahinch	Lea	Mountmellick
Bellair (or Cappanapinion)	83	Tinnahinch	Kilmanman	Mountmellick
Bellegrove	702	Portnahinch	Lea	Mountmellick
Bernardsgrove (or Ballypickas Lower)	207	Cullenagh	Ballyroan	Abbeyleix
Bigbog	206	Stradbally	Dysartenos	Athy
Binbawn	108	Stradbally	Curraclone	Athy
Birchwood	201	Tinnahinch	Rearymore	Mountmellick
Blackford	278	Stradbally	Curraclone	Athy
Blackhills	201	Cullenagh	Abbeyleix	Abbeyleix
Bockagh	1,448	Upperwoods	Offerlane	Mountmellick
Boghlone	306	Maryborough East	Clonenagh and Clonagheen	Mountmellick
Boherard	491	Clarmallagh	Aghaboe	Abbeyleix
Bohernaghty	272	Upperwoods	Offerlane	Abbeyleix
Bohernasear	89	Slievemargy	Killeshin	Carlow
Boley	1,090	Ballyadams	Rathaspick	Athy
Boley	804	Cullenagh	Abbeyleix	Abbeyleix
Boley Lower	425	Cullenagh	Clonenagh and Clonagheen	Abbeyleix
Boley Upper	600	Maryborough West	Clonenagh and Clonagheen	Abbeyleix
Boleybawn	603	Cullenagh	Dysartgallen	Abbeyleix
Boleybeg	715	Cullenagh	Dysartgallen	Abbeyleix
Bolnagree	92	Portnahinch	Lea	Mountmellick
Bordowin	439	Upperwoods	Offerlane	Mountmellick
Bordwell Big	180	Clarmallagh	Bordwell	Donaghmore
Bordwell Little	80	Clarmallagh	Bordwell	Donaghmore
Borraghaun	178	Clandonagh	Rathsaran	Donaghmore
Borris Great	529	Maryborough East	Borris	Mountmellick
Borris Little	419	Maryborough East	Borris	Mountmellick
**Borris-in-Ossory**	Town	Clandonagh	Aghaboe	Donaghmore
Boston	33	Upperwoods	Offerlane	Abbeyleix
Boston (or Coolballyogan)	144	Maryborough West	Abbeyleix	Abbeyleix
Boyle	48	Tinnahinch	Rearymore	Mountmellick
Braccas	97	Clarmallagh	Aghmacart	Abbeyleix
Bracklone	303	Portnahinch	Lea	Mountmellick
Brandra	195	Cullenagh	Abbeyleix	Abbeyleix
Brennanshill	196	Stradbally	Tullomoy	Athy
Briscula	68	Maryborough West	Clonenagh and Clonagheen	Mountmellick
Brisha	828	Upperwoods	Offerlane	Mountmellick
Brittas	492	Tinnahinch	Kilmanman	Mountmellick
Brittas	327	Portnahinch	Ardea	Mountmellick
Brocka	53	Clarmallagh	Kildellig	Donaghmore
Brockagh	620	Tinnahinch	Kilmanman	Mountmellick
Brockaghbeg	95	Tinnahinch	Kilmanman	Mountmellick
Brockleypark	277	Stradbally	Stradbally	Athy
Brockra	844	Maryborough West	Clonenagh and Clonagheen	Mountmellick
Brockry	78	Clandonagh	Rathdowney	Donaghmore
Brogherla Big	170	Tinnahinch	Kilmanman	Mountmellick
Brogherla Little	67	Tinnahinch	Kilmanman	Mountmellick
Bughorn	182	Upperwoods	Offerlane	Mountmellick
Bunastick	69	Tinnahinch	Kilmanman	Mountmellick
Bunlacken	213	Clarmallagh	Aghmacart	Abbeyleix
Bushfield (or Maghernaskeagh)	258	Clandonagh	Aghaboe	Donaghmore
Butterisland	180	Upperwoods	Offerlane	Abbeyleix
Caher (Custodia)	358	Upperwoods	Offerlane	Abbeyleix
Caher (Retrenched)	446	Upperwoods	Offerlane	Abbeyleix
Camcloon	535	Maryborough West	Clonenagh and Clonagheen	Mountmellick
Camira Glebe	276	Tinnahinch	Rosenallis	Mountmellick
Camlcoon	171	Upperwoods	Offerlane	Abbeyleix
Camphill	232	Upperwoods	Offerlane	Abbeyleix
Camross	384	Upperwoods	Offerlane	Mountmellick
Cannonswood	262	Clarmallagh	Aghmacart	Abbeyleix
Capard	2,548	Tinnahinch	Rosenallis	Mountmellick
Cappabeg	299	Tinnahinch	Rosenallis	Mountmellick
Cappagh	163	Clandonagh	Aghaboe	Donaghmore
Cappagh North	523	Maryborough East	Clonenagh and Clonagheen	Mountmellick
Cappagh South	488	Maryborough West	Clonenagh and Clonagheen	Mountmellick
Cappaghnahoran (or Windsor)	269	Upperwoods	Offerlane	Abbeyleix
Cappakeel	1,527	Portnahinch	Coolbanagher	Mountmellick
Cappalane	193	Tinnahinch	Rosenallis	Mountmellick
Cappalinnan	426	Clandonagh	Rathdowney	Donaghmore
Cappalough	478	Tinnahinch	Castlebrack	Mountmellick
Cappaloughlin (or Clonard)	1,592	Maryborough West	Clonenagh and Clonagheen	Abbeyleix
Cappalug	342	Slievemargy	Killeshin	Carlow
Cappanaboe	177	Slievemargy	Killeshin	Carlow
Cappanacleare	175	Maryborough West	Clonenagh and Clonagheen	Mountmellick
Cappanacloghy	574	Maryborough West	Clonenagh and Clonagheen	Abbeyleix
Cappanafeacle	260	Ballyadams	Ballyadams	Athy
Cappanagraigue	86	Tinnahinch	Kilmanman	Mountmellick
Cappanamrogue	179	Slievemargy	Killeshin	Carlow
Cappanapinion (or Bellair)	83	Tinnahinch	Kilmanman	Mountmellick
Cappanarrow	385	Upperwoods	Offerlane	Mountmellick
Cappanashannagh	263	Cullenagh	Dysartgallen	Abbeyleix
Cappaneary	197	Tinnahinch	Rosenallis	Mountmellick
Cappanlug	151	Tinnahinch	Castlebrack	Mountmellick
Cappanrush	309	Maryborough West	Clonenagh and Clonagheen	Mountmellick
Capparogan	70	Tinnahinch	Kilmanman	Mountmellick
Cappoley	441	Maryborough East	Kilcolmanbane	Mountmellick
Capponellan	429	Clarmallagh	Durrow	Abbeyleix
Cappusteen	29	Tinnahinch	Kilmanman	Mountmellick
Cardtown	531	Upperwoods	Offerlane	Mountmellick
Carn (or Curraghane)	740	Portnahinch	Coolbanagher	Mountmellick
Carricksallagh	62	Stradbally	Stradbally	Athy
Carrigeen	186	Stradbally	Kilteale	Mountmellick
Carrigeen	110	Stradbally	Fossy or Timahoe	Athy
Carrowreagh	293	Clarmallagh	Aghaboe	Donaghmore
Carrowreagh	209	Upperwoods	Offerlane	Mountmellick
Carrowreagh and Derreen	524	Clarmallagh	Aghmacart	Abbeyleix
Cashel	884	Cullenagh	Ballyroan	Abbeyleix
Cashel	234	Upperwoods	Offerlane	Abbeyleix
Castlebrack	179	Tinnahinch	Castlebrack	Mountmellick
Castleconor	212	Upperwoods	Offerlane	Mountmellick
Castlecuffe	1,273	Tinnahinch	Kilmanman	Mountmellick
Castledurrow Demesne	829	Clarmallagh	Durrow	Abbeyleix
Castlefleming (Giles)	380	Clandonagh	Rathdowney	Donaghmore
Castlefleming (Manly)	83	Clandonagh	Rathdowney	Donaghmore
Castlefleming (or Heath)	329	Clandonagh	Rathdowney	Donaghmore
Castlefleming (Stubber)	206	Clandonagh	Rathdowney	Donaghmore
Castlegrogan	211	Clandonagh	Rathsaran	Donaghmore
Castlequarter	187	Clandonagh	Skirk	Donaghmore
Castlequarter	133	Clarmallagh	Aghmacart	Abbeyleix
**Castletown**	Town	Upperwoods	Offerlane	Abbeyleix
Castletown	370	Clandonagh	Donaghmore	Donaghmore
Castletown	298	Slievemargy	Killabban	Carlow
Castletown	186	Clandonagh	Kyle	Donaghmore
Castletrench	429	Upperwoods	Offerlane	Abbeyleix
Castleview	67	Clarmallagh	Durrow	Abbeyleix
Castlewood	337	Clarmallagh	Durrow	Abbeyleix
Cavansheath	212	Maryborough West	Clonenagh and Clonagheen	Mountmellick
Chapelhill	104	Clarmallagh	Bordwell	Abbeyleix
Chapelhill	3	Clarmallagh	Aghaboe	Abbeyleix
Charleville (or Raheen)	219	Clandonagh	Kyle	Donaghmore
Churchfield	46	Upperwoods	Offerlane	Abbeyleix
Churchtown	150	Upperwoods	Offerlane	Abbeyleix
Clanygowan	1,276	Maryborough West	Clonenagh and Clonagheen	Mountmellick
Clarahill	301	Tinnahinch	Rearymore	Mountmellick
Clarbarracum	299	Cullenagh	Dysartgallen	Abbeyleix
Clash	151	Upperwoods	Offerlane	Mountmellick
Clashboy	163	Cullenagh	Fossy or Timahoe	Abbeyleix
Clashnamuck	261	Upperwoods	Offerlane	Abbeyleix
Cleanagh	203	Cullenagh	Dysartgallen	Abbeyleix
Cloghoge	189	Cullenagh	Dysartgallen	Abbeyleix
Clogrenan	788	Slievemargy	Cloydagh	Carlow
Clogrenan	81	Slievemargy	Killeshin	Carlow
Clonadacasey	649	Maryborough West	Clonenagh and Clonagheen	Abbeyleix
Clonaddadoran	1,893	Maryborough West	Clonenagh and Clonagheen	Abbeyleix
Clonageera	110	Clarmallagh	Durrow	Abbeyleix
Clonagh	399	Slievemargy	Killabban	Carlow
Clonagh	364	Maryborough West	Clonenagh and Clonagheen	Mountmellick
Clonagh	44	Tinnahinch	Kilmanman	Mountmellick
Clonaghadoo	240	Tinnahinch	Castlebrack	Mountmellick
Clonagooden	316	Clandonagh	Skirk	Donaghmore
Clonaheen	614	Tinnahinch	Rosenallis	Mountmellick
Clonanny	418	Portnahinch	Lea	Mountmellick
Clonard (or Cappaloughlin)	1,592	Maryborough West	Clonenagh and Clonagheen	Abbeyleix
**Clonaslee**	Town	Tinnahinch	Kilmanman	Mountmellick
Clonaslee	77	Tinnahinch	Kilmanman	Mountmellick
Clonawoolan	103	Maryborough West	Clonenagh and Clonagheen	Abbeyleix
Clonbane	207	Maryborough West	Clonenagh and Clonagheen	Abbeyleix
Clonbarrow	186	Maryborough West	Clonenagh and Clonagheen	Mountmellick
Clonboyne	747	Maryborough East	Clonenagh and Clonagheen	Mountmellick
Clonbrock	914	Slievemargy	Killabban	Carlow
Clonburren	37	Clandonagh	Donaghmore	Donaghmore
Clonburren (Moore)	452	Clandonagh	Rathdowney	Donaghmore
Clonburren (White)	204	Clandonagh	Rathdowney	Donaghmore
Cloncanon Lower	259	Tinnahinch	Rosenallis	Mountmellick
Cloncanon Upper	207	Tinnahinch	Rosenallis	Mountmellick
Cloncosney	141	Portnahinch	Ardea	Mountmellick
Cloncough	246	Maryborough West	Clonenagh and Clonagheen	Abbeyleix
Cloncourse	634	Maryborough West	Clonenagh and Clonagheen	Mountmellick
Cloncourse	405	Clandonagh	Kyle	Roscrea
Cloncullane	397	Cullenagh	Ballyroan	Abbeyleix
Cloncullen	280	Maryborough West	Clonenagh and Clonagheen	Mountmellick
Cloncully	355	Upperwoods	Offerlane	Mountmellick
Clondarrig	381	Maryborough East	Clonenagh and Clonagheen	Mountmellick
Clondoolagh	33	Stradbally	Timogue	Athy
Clondouglas	119	Maryborough West	Clonenagh and Clonagheen	Abbeyleix
Clondouglas (or Clonkeen)	253	Maryborough West	Clonenagh and Clonagheen	Abbeyleix
Clonduff	428	Tinnahinch	Rearymore	Mountmellick
Cloneeb	215	Clandonagh	Rathdowney	Donaghmore
Cloneen (or Closeland)	401	Portnahinch	Lea	Mountmellick
Clonehurk	697	Maryborough West	Clonenagh and Clonagheen	Mountmellick
Clonenagh	513	Maryborough West	Clonenagh and Clonagheen	Mountmellick
Clonfad	229	Upperwoods	Offerlane	Abbeyleix
Clonin	729	Upperwoods	Offerlane	Mountmellick
Clonincurragh	749	Upperwoods	Offerlane	Mountmellick
Clonkeen	1,173	Maryborough West	Clonenagh and Clonagheen	Abbeyleix
Clonkeen	551	Cullenagh	Abbeyleix	Abbeyleix
Clonkeen (or Clondouglas)	253	Maryborough West	Clonenagh and Clonagheen	Abbeyleix
Clonlahy Corporation-land	41	Clandonagh	Skirk	Donaghmore
Clonlyon	533	Tinnahinch	Kilmanman	Mountmellick
Clonmeen North	866	Clandonagh	Rathdowney	Donaghmore
Clonmeen South	539	Clandonagh	Rathdowney	Donaghmore
Clonmeenwood	116	Clandonagh	Rathdowney	Donaghmore
Clonminan	156	Maryborough East	Borris	Mountmellick
Clonmore	633	Clandonagh	Rathdowney	Donaghmore
Clonmore	180	Slievemargy	Killeshin	Carlow
Clonoghil	527	Upperwoods	Offerlane	Mountmellick
Clonoghil	244	Cullenagh	Abbeyleix	Abbeyleix
Clononeen	327	Upperwoods	Offerlane	Donaghmore
Clonoonagh	346	Clandonagh	Kyle	Roscrea
Clonpierce	540	Ballyadams	Killabban	Athy
Clonreher	567	Maryborough East	Borris	Mountmellick
Clonroosk	122	Maryborough East	Clonenagh and Clonagheen	Mountmellick
Clonroosk Little	111	Maryborough East	Clonenagh and Clonagheen	Mountmellick
Clonrud	153	Maryborough West	Clonenagh and Clonagheen	Abbeyleix
Clonsoghey	696	Maryborough East	Borris	Mountmellick
Clonterry	393	Portnahinch	Ardea	Mountmellick
Clontycoc	244	Cullenagh	Ballyroan	Abbeyleix
Clontycoc	202	Cullenagh	Dysartgallen	Abbeyleix
Clontyglass	331	Maryborough West	Clonenagh and Clonagheen	Mountmellick
Clonybecan	289	Slievemargy	Killabban	Carlow
Clonygark (or Rearyvalley)	582	Tinnahinch	Rearymore	Mountmellick
Cloonagh	161	Tinnahinch	Rosenallis	Mountmellick
Cloonagh Beg	200	Tinnahinch	Kilmanman	Mountmellick
Cloonagh More	610	Tinnahinch	Kilmanman	Mountmellick
Cloonaloo	198	Slievemargy	Killeshin	Carlow
Cloosecullen	402	Maryborough West	Clonenagh and Clonagheen	Abbeyleix
Clopook	342	Stradbally	Tullomoy	Athy
Clorhaun	209	Clarmallagh	Rosconnell	Abbeyleix
Closeland (or Cloneen)	401	Portnahinch	Lea	Mountmellick
Coldmanscurragh	58	Upperwoods	Offerlane	Mountmellick
Colt	2,082	Maryborough West	Clonenagh and Clonagheen	Abbeyleix
Commons (or Laught)	236	Tinnahinch	Castlebrack	Mountmellick
Cones	1,293	Tinnahinch	Rearymore	Mountmellick
Controversyland (or Ullard)	223	Portnahinch	Lea	Mountmellick
Cookesfield	30	Upperwoods	Offerlane	Abbeyleix
Cool	162	Clarmallagh	Killermogh	Abbeyleix
Coolaboghlan	188	Tinnahinch	Kilmanman	Mountmellick
Coolacurragh	263	Clarmallagh	Coolkerry	Donaghmore
Coolagh	1,155	Tinnahinch	Kilmanman	Mountmellick
Coolagh	264	Portnahinch	Coolbanagher	Mountmellick
Coolagh, Coolavoran & Derrymullen	972	Tinnahinch	Castlebrack	Mountmellick
Coolaghy and Coolnavarnogue	1,316	Portnahinch	Coolbanagher	Mountmellick
Coolanagh	221	Slievemargy	Killabban	Carlow
Coolanowle	253	Slievemargy	Killabban	Carlow
Coolavoran, Coolagh & Derrymullen	972	Tinnahinch	Castlebrack	Mountmellick
Coolbally	434	Clarmallagh	Aghaboe	Donaghmore
Coolballyogan (or Boston)	144	Maryborough West	Abbeyleix	Abbeyleix
Coolbanagher	947	Portnahinch	Coolbanagher	Mountmellick
Coolcorberry	52	Clarmallagh	Durrow	Abbeyleix
Coolcorberry	15	Clarmallagh	Abbeyleix	Abbeyleix
Coolderry	458	Clarmallagh	Killermogh	Abbeyleix
Coole	360	Upperwoods	Offerlane	Abbeyleix
Coole	225	Maryborough West	Clonenagh and Clonagheen	Abbeyleix
Coole (or Lisnagomman)	63	Cullenagh	Dysartgallen	Abbeyleix
Coolfin	271	Clarmallagh	Bordwell	Donaghmore
Coolfin	56	Clarmallagh	Aghaboe	Abbeyleix
Coolfin	3	Clandonagh	Rathdowney	Donaghmore
Coolgarragh	173	Ballyadams	Killabban	Athy
Coolglass	412	Stradbally	Tullomoy	Athy
Coolhenry	149	Slievemargy	Killeshin	Carlow
Coolkerry	480	Clarmallagh	Coolkerry	Donaghmore
Coolnabacky	540	Cullenagh	Fossy or Timahoe	Abbeyleix
Coolnabanch	134	Tinnahinch	Kilmanman	Mountmellick
Coolnabehy	128	Clarmallagh	Durrow	Abbeyleix
Coolnaboul East	4	Clandonagh	Coolkerry	Donaghmore
Coolnaboul West	159	Clandonagh	Rathdowney	Donaghmore
Coolnacarrick	152	Maryborough West	Dysartenos	Mountmellick
Coolnacartan	415	Maryborough West	Clonenagh and Clonagheen	Abbeyleix
Coolnagour	168	Upperwoods	Offerlane	Mountmellick
Coolnamona	347	Maryborough West	Clonenagh and Clonagheen	Mountmellick
Coolnamony Lower	36	Tinnahinch	Rearymore	Mountmellick
Coolnamony Upper	562	Tinnahinch	Rearymore	Mountmellick
Coolnavarroge and Coolaghy	1,316	Portnahinch	Coolbanagher	Mountmellick
Coolowley (Mason)	317	Clandonagh	Rathdowney	Donaghmore
Coolowley (Plott)	278	Clandonagh	Rathdowney	Donaghmore
**Coolrain**	Town	Upperwoods	Offerlane	Mountmellick
Coolrain	345	Upperwoods	Offerlane	Mountmellick
Coolrain	133	Slievemargy	Killeshin	Carlow
Coolrain	63	Slievemargy	Killabban	Carlow
Coolroe	474	Portnahinch	Lea	Mountmellick
Coolrusk	137	Stradbally	Tullomoy	Athy
Cooltedery	764	Portnahinch	Lea	Mountmellick
Cooltoran	192	Maryborough East	Borris	Mountmellick
Coonbeg	225	Slievemargy	Killabban	Carlow
Cooperhill Demesne	466	Slievemargy	Killabban	Carlow
Coorlaghan	398	Slievemargy	Killeshin	Carlow
Coornariska	221	Slievemargy	Killeshin	Carlow
Corbally	1,022	Ballyadams	Tecolm	Athy
Corbally	453	Tinnahinch	Rosenallis	Mountmellick
Corbally	406	Maryborough West	Clonenagh and Clonagheen	Abbeyleix
Corbally	114	Tinnahinch	Kilmanman	Mountmellick
Corporation Land 1st Div	7	Clandonagh	Skirk	Donaghmore
Corporation Land 2nd Div	9	Clandonagh	Skirk	Donaghmore
Corporation Land 3rd Div	16	Clandonagh	Skirk	Donaghmore
Corraun	752	Clarmallagh	Aghaboe	Donaghmore
Correel	213	Stradbally	Curraclone	Athy
Correel	1	Stradbally	Moyanna	Athy
Corrigeen	299	Upperwoods	Offerlane	Abbeyleix
Cottagefarm	199	Portnahinch	Coolbanagher	Mountmellick
Course	264	Clarmallagh	Durrow	Abbeyleix
Court	149	Clarmallagh	Bordwell	Donaghmore
Courtwood	1,740	Portnahinch	Lea	Mountmellick
Craigueavallagh	303	Clandonagh	Rathsaran	Donaghmore
Craigueavoice	393	Clarmallagh	Aghmacart	Abbeyleix
Crannagh	477	Ballyadams	Ballyadams	Athy
Crannagh	464	Upperwoods	Offerlane	Mountmellick
Creelagh	108	Clandonagh	Rathdowney	Donaghmore
Cremorgan	905	Cullenagh	Kilcolmanbrack	Abbeyleix
Crettyard	204	Slievemargy	Killabban	Carlow
Crissard	733	Ballyadams	Rathaspick	Athy
Cromoge	363	Maryborough West	Clonenagh and Clonagheen	Abbeyleix
Cross	209	Clarmallagh	Aghaboe	Donaghmore
Crossfield	42	Upperwoods	Offerlane	Abbeyleix
Crossneen	520	Slievemargy	Killeshin	Carlow
Crubeen	600	Cullenagh	Ballyroan	Abbeyleix
Cruell	199	Clarmallagh	Aghaboe	Abbeyleix
Cuddagh	1,213	Upperwoods	Offerlane	Abbeyleix
Cuffsborough	496	Clarmallagh	Aghaboe	Abbeyleix
Cullahill Mountain	570	Clarmallagh	Aghmacart	Abbeyleix
Cullenagh	1,531	Cullenagh	Ballyroan	Abbeyleix
Cullenagh	269	Ballyadams	Killabban	Athy
Cullenagh	128	Ballyadams	Tankardstown	Athy
Cummer	769	Upperwoods	Offerlane	Mountmellick
Curraclone	24	Stradbally	Curraclone	Athy
Curragh	190	Clarmallagh	Bordwell	Donaghmore
Curragh	185	Slievemargy	Killeshin	Carlow
Curraghacronacon	131	Cullenagh	Abbeyleix	Abbeyleix
Curraghane (or Carn)	740	Portnahinch	Coolbanagher	Mountmellick
Curraghmore	325	Clandonagh	Skirk	Donaghmore
Curraghnadeige	57	Tinnahinch	Kilmanman	Mountmellick
Curriersbog	73	Maryborough East	Borris	Mountmellick
Cush Lower	397	Tinnahinch	Kilmanman	Mountmellick
Cush Upper	242	Tinnahinch	Kilmanman	Mountmellick
Dairyhill	426	Clarmallagh	Aghaboe	Abbeyleix
Danganroe	170	Upperwoods	Offerlane	Abbeyleix
Dangans	439	Portnahinch	Ardea	Mountmellick
Debicot	126	Portnahinch	Ardea	Mountmellick
Deerpark	741	Maryborough West	Clonenagh and Clonagheen	Mountmellick
Deerpark	667	Upperwoods	Offerlane	Mountmellick
Delligabaun	166	Clarmallagh	Aghaboe	Donaghmore
Derinduff	54	Upperwoods	Offerlane	Mountmellick
Dernacart	154	Tinnahinch	Castlebrack	Mountmellick
Dernamanagh	117	Upperwoods	Offerlane	Mountmellick
Derraugh	329	Maryborough West	Clonenagh and Clonagheen	Mountmellick
Derreen (or Mullaghanard)	188	Tinnahinch	Rosenallis	Mountmellick
Derreen and Carrowreagh	524	Clarmallagh	Aghmacart	Abbeyleix
Derries	618	Portnahinch	Lea	Mountmellick
Derries (The) (or Ballyshanduff)	618	Portnahinch	Lea	Mountmellick
Derrin	485	Clandonagh	Aghaboe	Donaghmore
Derrinoliver	75	Clandonagh	Aghaboe	Donaghmore
Derrinsallagh	424	Clandonagh	Aghaboe	Donaghmore
Derrintray Glebe	284	Tinnahinch	Kilmanman	Mountmellick
Derry	638	Tinnahinch	Rearymore	Mountmellick
Derry	326	Tinnahinch	Kilmanman	Mountmellick
Derry	286	Maryborough East	Straboe	Mountmellick
Derry	140	Maryborough East	Dysartenos	Mountmellick
Derry Beg	140	Maryborough West	Clonenagh and Clonagheen	Mountmellick
Derry More	152	Maryborough West	Clonenagh and Clonagheen	Mountmellick
Derryarrow	184	Upperwoods	Offerlane	Abbeyleix
Derrybrock	141	Stradbally	Moyanna	Athy
Derrycanton	364	Upperwoods	Offerlane	Mountmellick
Derrycarrow	522	Upperwoods	Offerlane	Mountmellick
Derrycloney	625	Portnahinch	Ardea	Mountmellick
Derrycon	393	Upperwoods	Offerlane	Mountmellick
Derrydavy	250	Portnahinch	Ardea	Mountmellick
Derryduff	348	Upperwoods	Offerlane	Mountmellick
Derryfore	269	Cullenagh	Ballyroan	Abbeyleix
Derrygarran	358	Maryborough East	Straboe	Mountmellick
Derrygile	795	Portnahinch	Ardea	Mountmellick
Derryhay	42	Upperwoods	Offerlane	Mountmellick
Derrykearn	1,044	Maryborough West	Clonenagh and Clonagheen	Abbeyleix
Derrylahan	313	Upperwoods	Offerlane	Mountmellick
Derrylahan	196	Cullenagh	Abbeyleix	Abbeyleix
Derrylemoge	583	Tinnahinch	Rosenallis	Mountmellick
Derrylinneen	55	Tinnahinch	Kilmanman	Mountmellick
Derrylusk	339	Maryborough West	Clonenagh and Clonagheen	Mountmellick
Derrymoyle	141	Slievemargy	Killeshin	Carlow
Derrymullen (or Coolagh)	972	Tinnahinch	Castlebrack	Mountmellick
Derrymullen (or Coolavoran)	972	Tinnahinch	Castlebrack	Mountmellick
Derrynafunshion	210	Portnahinch	Lea	Mountmellick
Derrynaseera	682	Upperwoods	Offerlane	Mountmellick
Derryroe	58	Maryborough West	Clonenagh and Clonagheen	Abbeyleix
Derrytrasna	199	Stradbally	Fossy or Timahoe	Athy
Derryvorrigan	238	Clandonagh	Aghaboe	Donaghmore
**Donaghmore**	Town	Clandonagh	Rathdowney	Donaghmore
**Donaghmore**	Town	Clandonagh	Donaghmore	Donaghmore
Donaghmore	191	Clandonagh	Donaghmore	Donaghmore
Donaghmore	172	Clandonagh	Rathdowney	Donaghmore
Donore	110	Upperwoods	Offerlane	Abbeyleix
Dooary	977	Cullenagh	Ballyroan	Abbeyleix
Doolough	206	Portnahinch	Lea	Mountmellick
Doon	539	Maryborough West	Clonenagh and Clonagheen	Abbeyleix
Doon	315	Clandonagh	Aghaboe	Donaghmore
Doonane	1,685	Slievemargy	Rathaspick	Carlow
Downs	71	Maryborough East	Borris	Mountmellick
Drim	572	Upperwoods	Offerlane	Mountmellick
Drimaterril	330	Cullenagh	Dysartgallen	Abbeyleix
Drimhill (or Quarryfarm)	71	Upperwoods	Offerlane	Mountmellick
Drimmo	142	Upperwoods	Offerlane	Mountmellick
Drinagh	178	Tinnahinch	Rosenallis	Mountmellick
Droughill	286	Portnahinch	Lea	Mountmellick
Drumagh	384	Slievemargy	Killabban	Carlow
Drumashellig	324	Cullenagh	Ballyroan	Abbeyleix
Drummond	922	Tinnahinch	Rearymore	Mountmellick
Drumnabehy	267	Tinnahinch	Rearymore	Mountmellick
Drumneen	395	Stradbally	Ballyadams	Athy
Drumroe	170	Ballyadams	Ballyadams	Athy
Dunacleggan	126	Clandonagh	Rathdowney	Donaghmore
Dunamase (or Park)	338	Maryborough East	Dysartenos	Mountmellick
Dunbrin Lower	186	Ballyadams	Ballyadams	Athy
Dunbrin Upper	167	Ballyadams	Ballyadams	Athy
Dunmore	446	Clarmallagh	Durrow	Abbeyleix
Dunmore	286	Clarmallagh	Abbeyleix	Abbeyleix
**Durrow**	Town	Clarmallagh	Durrow	Abbeyleix
Durrow Townparks	721	Clarmallagh	Durrow	Abbeyleix
Dysart	773	Maryborough East	Dysartenos	Mountmellick
Dysartbeagh	438	Maryborough West	Clonenagh and Clonagheen	Mountmellick
Eglish	118	Clandonagh	Rathsaran	Donaghmore
Elderfield	40	Upperwoods	Offerlane	Abbeyleix
Emo Park	1,945	Portnahinch	Coolbanagher	Mountmellick
Errill	390	Clandonagh	Rathdowney	Donaghmore
Erris (or Skirk Glebe)	105	Clandonagh	Skirk	Donaghmore
Esker	368	Cullenagh	Fossy or Timahoe	Abbeyleix
Esker	272	Maryborough West	Clonenagh and Clonagheen	Mountmellick
Eyne	692	Maryborough East	Straboe	Mountmellick
Fallaghmore	229	Ballyadams	Ballyadams	Athy
Fallowbeg Lower	292	Stradbally	Tullomoy	Athy
Fallowbeg Middle	117	Stradbally	Tullomoy	Athy
Fallowbeg Upper	411	Stradbally	Tullomoy	Athy
Farnans	1,596	Slievemargy	Killabban	Carlow
Farraneglish Glebe	177	Clarmallagh	Aghaboe	Abbeyleix
Farranville	108	Clandonagh	Bordwell	Donaghmore
Fatharnagh	134	Maryborough West	Clonenagh and Clonagheen	Abbeyleix
Fearagh	81	Clarmallagh	Aghaboe	Abbeyleix
Fermoyle	198	Clarmallagh	Rosconnell	Abbeyleix
Fermoyle	131	Clarmallagh	Durrow	Abbeyleix
Fernyhill	86	Stradbally	Tullomoy	Athy
Fisherstown	504	Portnahinch	Lea	Mountmellick
Forest	184	Maryborough West	Clonenagh and Clonagheen	Abbeyleix
Forest Lower	856	Tinnahinch	Castlebrack	Mountmellick
Forest Upper	1,274	Tinnahinch	Castlebrack	Mountmellick
Forgeland	151	Maryborough West	Clonenagh and Clonagheen	Mountmellick
Fossy Lower	245	Cullenagh	Fossy or Timahoe	Abbeyleix
Fossy Upper	933	Cullenagh	Fossy or Timahoe	Abbeyleix
Foxburrow	161	Maryborough West	Clonenagh and Clonagheen	Abbeyleix
Friarsland	144	Clarmallagh	Aghaboe	Donaghmore
Galesquarter	203	Clarmallagh	Aghmacart	Abbeyleix
Garrafin	296	Upperwoods	Offerlane	Mountmellick
Garragh (or Woodland)	209	Slievemargy	Killabban	Carlow
Garranbaun	1,238	Upperwoods	Offerlane	Mountmellick
Garranmaconly	789	Clandonagh	Skirk	Donaghmore
Garranmaconly	298	Clandonagh	Rathdowney	Donaghmore
Garrans	469	Stradbally	Curraclone	Athy
Garrendenny	620	Slievemargy	Killabban	Carlow
Garrintaggart	289	Cullenagh	Dysartgallen	Abbeyleix
Garrison	85	Clandonagh	Rathdowney	Donaghmore
Garroon (or Summergrove)	239	Tinnahinch	Rosenallis	Mountmellick
Garroonagh	130	Ballyadams	Ballyadams	Athy
Garrough	151	Slievemargy	Killeshin	Carlow
Garryduff	815	Clandonagh	Rathdowney	Donaghmore
Garryduff	295	Clarmallagh	Aghaboe	Donaghmore
Garryduff	143	Clarmallagh	Kildellig	Donaghmore
Garryduff	26	Stradbally	Killenny	Mountmellick
Garryglass	1,210	Cullenagh	Fossy or Timahoe	Abbeyleix
Garryhedder	611	Tinnahinch	Kilmanman	Mountmellick
Garrymaddock	382	Stradbally	Moyanna	Athy
Garrymore	1,198	Tinnahinch	Castlebrack	Mountmellick
Garryniska	44	Clarmallagh	Bordwell	Donaghmore
Garryvacum	417	Portnahinch	Lea	Mountmellick
Gash	182	Upperwoods	Offerlane	Abbeyleix
Glasha	154	Clandonagh	Rathdowney	Donaghmore
Glebe	421	Upperwoods	Offerlane	Mountmellick
Glebe	165	Tinnahinch	Rearymore	Mountmellick
Glebe	71	Clarmallagh	Attanagh	Abbeyleix
Glebe	49	Cullenagh	Dysartgallen	Abbeyleix
Glebe	31	Clarmallagh	Durrow	Abbeyleix
Glebe	27	Tinnahinch	Kilmanman	Mountmellick
Glenall	357	Upperwoods	Offerlane	Mountmellick
Glenamoon	311	Upperwoods	Offerlane	Mountmellick
Glenbarrow	347	Tinnahinch	Rearymore	Mountmellick
Glenbower	389	Upperwoods	Offerlane	Mountmellick
Glenconra	838	Upperwoods	Offerlane	Mountmellick
Glendine	819	Upperwoods	Offerlane	Mountmellick
Glendine	751	Tinnahinch	Kilmanman	Mountmellick
Glendineoregan	858	Tinnahinch	Rearymore	Mountmellick
Glenkeen Lower	228	Tinnahinch	Kilmanman	Mountmellick
Glenkeen Upper	1,331	Tinnahinch	Kilmanman	Mountmellick
Glenkitt	706	Upperwoods	Offerlane	Mountmellick
Glenmacolla & Scrub	391	Clarmallagh	Aghmacart	Abbeyleix
Glennaglass	229	Upperwoods	Offerlane	Mountmellick
Gorragh Lower	234	Tinnahinch	Kilmanman	Mountmellick
Gorragh Upper	568	Tinnahinch	Kilmanman	Mountmellick
Gorreelagh	171	Stradbally	Tullomoy	Athy
Gortahile	869	Slievemargy	Killabban	Carlow
Gortavoata	3	Upperwoods	Offerlane	Abbeyleix
Gorteen	435	Clarmallagh	Aghmacart	Abbeyleix
Gorteen	410	Tinnahinch	Rosenallis	Mountmellick
Gorteen	321	Maryborough West	Clonenagh and Clonagheen	Mountmellick
Gorteen	43	Maryborough East	Borris	Mountmellick
Gorteennahilla	432	Clarmallagh	Glashare	Abbeyleix
Gorteennameale	1,610	Upperwoods	Offerlane	Mountmellick
Gortlusky	198	Upperwoods	Offerlane	Mountmellick
Gortnaclea	372	Clarmallagh	Aghaboe	Abbeyleix
Gortnaglogh	103	Upperwoods	Offerlane	Mountmellick
Gortnagroagh	61	Clarmallagh	Aghaboe	Abbeyleix
Gortnalee	399	Clandonagh	Donaghmore	Donaghmore
Gossbrook	55	Upperwoods	Offerlane	Mountmellick
Gracefield	74	Ballyadams	Rathaspick	Athy
Graceswood	180	Clarmallagh	Abbeyleix	Abbeyleix
Graigavern	185	Portnahinch	Lea	Mountmellick
**Graigue**	Town	Slievemargy	Killeshin	Carlow
Graigue	646	Tinnahinch	Rosenallis	Mountmellick
Graigue	622	Slievemargy	Killeshin	Carlow
Graigue	309	Cullenagh	Dysartgallen	Abbeyleix
Graigue	167	Ballyadams	Tankardstown	Athy
Graigue	39	Tinnahinch	Kilmanman	Mountmellick
Graigueadrisly	815	Clandonagh	Erke	Donaghmore
Graigueafulla	975	Tinnahinch	Kilmanman	Mountmellick
Graigueagarran	313	Clarmallagh	Erke	Donaghmore
Graigueanossy	182	Clarmallagh	Coolkerry	Abbeyleix
Graigueard	397	Clarmallagh	Erke	Donaghmore
Graigueavallagh	134	Clandonagh	Rathdowney	Donaghmore
Graiguenahown	1,061	Cullenagh	Dysartgallen	Abbeyleix
Graiguenasmuttan	845	Cullenagh	Dysartgallen	Abbeyleix
Granafallow	170	Cullenagh	Abbeyleix	Abbeyleix
Grange	863	Ballyadams	Monksgrange	Athy
Grange	321	Tinnahinch	Castlebrack	Mountmellick
Grange Beg	250	Clandonagh	Aghaboe	Donaghmore
Grange Lower	225	Stradbally	Dysartenos	Athy
Grange More	468	Clandonagh	Aghaboe	Donaghmore
Grange Upper	417	Stradbally	Dysartenos	Athy
Grantstown	472	Clarmallagh	Bordwell	Donaghmore
Grantstown	23	Clarmallagh	Aghaboe	Donaghmore
Greatheath	274	Maryborough East	Kilteale	Mountmellick
Greatheath	150	Portnahinch	Coolbanagher	Mountmellick
Grenan	519	Clarmallagh	Attanagh	Abbeyleix
Grenan	494	Clarmallagh	Durrow	Abbeyleix
Grenan	139	Clarmallagh	Rosconnell	Abbeyleix
Grogan	156	Clandonagh	Rathsaran	Donaghmore
Guileen	365	Stradbally	Tullomoy	Athy
Guileen	36	Stradbally	Timogue	Athy
Gurraun	240	Clarmallagh	Rosconnell	Abbeyleix
Gurteen	303	Slievemargy	Killabban	Carlow
Harristown	478	Clandonagh	Rathdowney	Donaghmore
Harristown	180	Slievemargy	Killeshin	Carlow
Haywood Demesne	304	Cullenagh	Dysartgallen	Abbeyleix
Heath (or Castlefleming)	329	Clandonagh	Rathdowney	Donaghmore
Heathlodge	182	Maryborough East	Kilteale	Mountmellick
Hollymount	380	Slievemargy	Shrule	Carlow
Hollymount	47	Slievemargy	Killabban	Carlow
Hophall	325	Maryborough East	Dysartenos	Mountmellick
Huntspark (or Ardough)	647	Slievemargy	Killabban	Carlow
Inch	397	Stradbally	Curraclone	Athy
Inch	198	Ballyadams	Rathaspick	Athy
Inchacooly	1,271	Portnahinch	Lea	Mountmellick
Inchanisky	271	Upperwoods	Offerlane	Mountmellick
Ironmills (or Kilrush)	1,548	Cullenagh	Abbeyleix	Abbeyleix
Iry	1,137	Maryborough West	Clonenagh and Clonagheen	Mountmellick
Island	430	Upperwoods	Offerlane	Mountmellick
Island	145	Cullenagh	Abbeyleix	Abbeyleix
Jamestown (or Ballyteigeduff)	699	Portnahinch	Lea	Mountmellick
Johnsborough	443	Upperwoods	Offerlane	Mountmellick
Johnstown Glebe	435	Clandonagh	Rathdowney	Donaghmore
Keelagh	267	Cullenagh	Dysartgallen	Abbeyleix
Keeloge	495	Slievemargy	Killeshin	Carlow
Keeloge North	400	Upperwoods	Offerlane	Mountmellick
Keeloge South	221	Upperwoods	Offerlane	Donaghmore
Keelough Glebe	220	Clarmallagh	Aghaboe	Donaghmore
Kellystown	194	Ballyadams	Rathaspick	Athy
Kellyville	409	Ballyadams	Ballyadams	Athy
Kilbeg	182	Clandonagh	Aghaboe	Donaghmore
Kilbrackan	256	Portnahinch	Lea	Mountmellick
Kilbreedy	421	Clarmallagh	Bordwell	Donaghmore
Kilbrickan	161	Upperwoods	Offerlane	Abbeyleix
Kilbride	625	Portnahinch	Lea	Mountmellick
Kilcavan	561	Tinnahinch	Castlebrack	Mountmellick
Kilcoke	639	Clandonagh	Rathdowney	Donaghmore
Kilcolmanbane	401	Maryborough East	Kilcolmanbane	Mountmellick
Kilcoran	298	Clandonagh	Rathdowney	Donaghmore
Kilcotton	382	Clandonagh	Aghaboe	Donaghmore
Kilcronan	170	Cullenagh	Dysartgallen	Abbeyleix
Kilcruise	656	Slievemargy	Killabban	Carlow
Kildellig	1,054	Clarmallagh	Kildellig	Donaghmore
Kildellig	51	Clarmallagh	Aghaboe	Donaghmore
Kildrinagh	69	Upperwoods	Offerlane	Abbeyleix
Kilfeacle	231	Ballyadams	Rathaspick	Athy
Kilgory	363	Slievemargy	Killabban	Carlow
Killabban	673	Ballyadams	Killabban	Athy
Killadooley	357	Clandonagh	Donaghmore	Donaghmore
Killadooley	222	Clandonagh	Skirk	Donaghmore
Killaglish	280	Portnahinch	Lea	Mountmellick
Killalooghan	198	Stradbally	Dysartenos	Athy
Killamuck	195	Cullenagh	Abbeyleix	Abbeyleix
Killasmeestia	199	Clandonagh	Skirk	Donaghmore
Killavally	172	Stradbally	Dysartenos	Athy
Killeany	1,232	Maryborough West	Clonenagh and Clonagheen	Abbeyleix
Killeen	442	Ballyadams	Killabban	Athy
Killeen	232	Stradbally	Moyanna	Mountmellick
Killeen	231	Upperwoods	Offerlane	Mountmellick
Killeen (or Killeenlynagh)	480	Portnahinch	Ardea	Mountmellick
Killeen (or Killeenlynagh)	149	Maryborough East	Straboe	Mountmellick
Killeenlynagh (or Killeen)	149	Maryborough East	Straboe	Mountmellick
Killeenlynagh (or Killen)	480	Portnahinch	Ardea	Mountmellick
Killenny	288	Stradbally	Killenny	Mountmellick
Killenny	112	Slievemargy	Killabban	Carlow
Killenny Beg (or Knocknagrally)	130	Clarmallagh	Aghmacart	Abbeyleix
Killenny More (or Toberboe)	621	Clarmallagh	Aghmacart	Abbeyleix
Killermogh	266	Clarmallagh	Killermogh	Abbeyleix
Killeshin	715	Slievemargy	Killeshin	Carlow
Killimy	380	Portnahinch	Coolbanagher	Mountmellick
Killinaparson	819	Tinnahinch	Kilmanman	Mountmellick
Killinure	539	Upperwoods	Offerlane	Mountmellick
Killinure	318	Portnahinch	Lea	Mountmellick
Killone	630	Stradbally	Killenny	Mountmellick
Killyganard	297	Ballyadams	Ballyadams	Athy
Kilmainham	468	Portnahinch	Ardea	Mountmellick
Kilmanman	177	Tinnahinch	Kilmanman	Mountmellick
Kilmartin	666	Clandonagh	Kyle	Donaghmore
Kilmilan	73	Clandonagh	Rathdowney	Donaghmore
Kilminchy	382	Maryborough East	Straboe	Mountmellick
Kilminfoyle	407	Clarmallagh	Aghaboe	Abbeyleix
Kilmorony	296	Ballyadams	Tankardstown	Athy
Kilmullen	307	Portnahinch	Lea	Mountmellick
Kilmurry	467	Stradbally	Kilteale	Mountmellick
Kilnacash	154	Portnahinch	Ardea	Mountmellick
Kilnaseer	645	Clarmallagh	Aghaboe	Abbeyleix
Kilnaseer	178	Clarmallagh	Aghmacart	Abbeyleix
Kilnashane	191	Cullenagh	Dysartgallen	Abbeyleix
Kilpurcel	336	Clandonagh	Donaghmore	Donaghmore
Kilrory	516	Stradbally	Moyanna	Athy
Kilrush (or Ironmills)	1,548	Cullenagh	Abbeyleix	Abbeyleix
Kilteale	121	Maryborough East	Kilteale	Mountmellick
Kilvahan	80	Cullenagh	Kilcolmanbane	Abbeyleix
Kilvahan	44	Cullenagh	Ballyroan	Abbeyleix
Knapton	178	Cullenagh	Abbeyleix	Abbeyleix
Knightstown (or Ballinriddery)	279	Portnahinch	Ardea	Mountmellick
Knockacoller	349	Upperwoods	Offerlane	Abbeyleix
Knockacrin	339	Cullenagh	Fossy or Timahoe	Abbeyleix
Knockahaw	705	Clandonagh	Rathdowney	Donaghmore
Knockahonagh	208	Stradbally	Tullomoy	Athy
Knockamullin	288	Clarmallagh	Aghaboe	Abbeyleix
Knockanina	437	Maryborough West	Clonenagh and Clonagheen	Mountmellick
Knockannagad	194	Upperwoods	Offerlane	Mountmellick
Knockanoran	470	Clarmallagh	Durrow	Abbeyleix
Knockanowl	123	Tinnahinch	Rearymore	Mountmellick
Knockardagannon North	627	Clandonagh	Rathdowney	Donaghmore
Knockardagannon South	291	Clandonagh	Rathdowney	Donaghmore
Knockardagur	567	Cullenagh	Dysartgallen	Abbeyleix
Knockaroe	220	Clandonagh	Aghaboe	Donaghmore
Knockbaun	1,042	Cullenagh	Dysartgallen	Abbeyleix
Knockbeg	228	Slievemargy	Sleaty	Carlow
Knockbrack	326	Upperwoods	Offerlane	Abbeyleix
Knockfin	367	Clarmallagh	Aghaboe	Abbeyleix
Knockheel	229	Clandonagh	Rathdowney	Donaghmore
Knockkyle (or Springfield)	396	Clarmallagh	Aghaboe	Abbeyleix
Knocklead	786	Cullenagh	Fossy or Timahoe	Abbeyleix
Knockmay	372	Maryborough East	Clonenagh and Clonagheen	Mountmellick
Knockmay	88	Maryborough East	Borris	Mountmellick
Knocknagrally (or Kilenny Beg)	130	Clarmallagh	Aghmacart	Abbeyleix
Knocknagroagh	419	Maryborough East	Borris	Mountmellick
Knocknakearn	369	Maryborough West	Clonenagh and Clonagheen	Mountmellick
Knocknambraher	165	Stradbally	Stradbally	Athy
Knocknamoe	396	Cullenagh	Abbeyleix	Abbeyleix
Knockphilip	91	Stradbally	Curraclone	Athy
Knocks	160	Maryborough West	Clonenagh and Clonagheen	Mountmellick
Knockseera	106	Clandonagh	Aghaboe	Donaghmore
Kyle	717	Clandonagh	Erke	Donaghmore
Kyle	435	Clarmallagh	Abbeyleix	Abbeyleix
Kyle	379	Clandonagh	Kyle	Roscrea
Kyle	275	Cullenagh	Fossy or Timahoe	Abbeyleix
Kyle	7	Tinnahinch	Rearymore	Mountmellick
Kyleamullaun	146	Clandonagh	Rathsaran	Donaghmore
Kylebeg	314	Clarmallagh	Durrow	Abbeyleix
Kylebeg	106	Stradbally	Curraclone	Athy
Kylebeg	56	Stradbally	Stradbally	Athy
Kyleclonhobert	283	Maryborough East	Borris	Mountmellick
Kylekiproe	125	Maryborough East	Borris	Mountmellick
Kylenabehy	319	Ballyadams	Rathaspick	Athy
Kylespiddoge	88	Stradbally	Moyanna	Athy
Kyletalesha	711	Maryborough East	Borris	Mountmellick
Kyletilloge	363	Clarmallagh	Aghaboe	Abbeyleix
Lacka	238	Upperwoods	Offerlane	Mountmellick
Lackamore	200	Tinnahinch	Castlebrack	Mountmellick
Lackan	193	Tinnahinch	Rosenallis	Mountmellick
Lackey	391	Clandonagh	Kyle	Roscrea
Lamberton Demesne	366	Maryborough East	Dysartenos	Mountmellick
Lambstown	29	Slievemargy	Killeshin	Carlow
Larch Hill	62	Upperwoods	Offerlane	Mountmellick
Larragan	216	Tinnahinch	Kilmanman	Mountmellick
Laught (or Commons)	236	Tinnahinch	Castlebrack	Mountmellick
Lauragh	88	Portnahinch	Ardea	Mountmellick
Laurelhill	77	Upperwoods	Offerlane	Mountmellick
Lea	1,097	Portnahinch	Lea	Mountmellick
Leagh	442	Slievemargy	Killeshin	Carlow
Leap	73	Clarmallagh	Aghaboe	Abbeyleix
Legaun	76	Clarmallagh	Aghaboe	Abbeyleix
Levally	345	Clarmallagh	Erke	Donaghmore
Lisbigney	531	Cullenagh	Abbeyleix	Abbeyleix
Lisduff	832	Clandonagh	Rathdowney	Donaghmore
Lismore	180	Clandonagh	Aghaboe	Donaghmore
Lismurragha	160	Clandonagh	Rathdowney	Donaghmore
Lisnagomman	179	Cullenagh	Dysartgallen	Abbeyleix
Lisnagomman (or Coole)	63	Cullenagh	Dysartgallen	Abbeyleix
Lisnarode	157	Tinnahinch	Kilmanman	Mountmellick
Longford	275	Upperwoods	Offerlane	Mountmellick
Lough	473	Portnahinch	Lea	Mountmellick
Loughakeo	173	Maryborough East	Dysartenos	Mountmellick
Loughlass	138	Ballyadams	Ballyadams	Athy
Loughmansland Glebe	132	Portnahinch	Lea	Mountmellick
Loughnamuck	4	Clarmallagh	Durrow	Abbeyleix
Loughteeog	428	Stradbally	Dysartenos	Athy
Lowran	553	Upperwoods	Offerlane	Abbeyleix
Luggacurren	1,838	Stradbally	Tullomoy	Athy
Lyroge	280	Clandonagh	Rathsaran	Donaghmore
Maghareagh	143	Ballyadams	Tankardstown	Athy
Maghernaskeagh (or Bushfield)	258	Clandonagh	Aghaboe	Donaghmore
Maidenhead	326	Slievemargy	Killabban	Carlow
Manger	43	Stradbally	Tullomoy	Athy
Mannin	508	Upperwoods	Offerlane	Abbeyleix
**Maryborough**	Town	Maryborough East	Borris	Mountmellick
Maryborough	391	Maryborough East	Borris	Mountmellick
Marymount	357	Upperwoods	Offerlane	Mountmellick
Maynebog	172	Clarmallagh	Aghmacart	Abbeyleix
Mayo	677	Slievemargy	Killabban	Carlow
Meelick	1,442	Tinnahinch	Rosenallis	Mountmellick
Meelick	292	Maryborough East	Kilcolmanbane	Mountmellick
Meelick	99	Maryborough East	Borris	Mountmellick
Middlemount	190	Clarmallagh	Aghaboe	Donaghmore
Middlemount (or Ballyvoghlaun)	434	Clarmallagh	Coolkerry	Donaghmore
Milford	65	Ballyadams	Tankardstown	Athy
Mill-land	54	Stradbally	Curraclone	Athy
Milltown	345	Ballyadams	Rathaspick	Athy
Moanfad	70	Clandonagh	Aghaboe	Donaghmore
Moat	570	Cullenagh	Dysartgallen	Abbeyleix
Moher East	335	Upperwoods	Offerlane	Mountmellick
Moher West	316	Upperwoods	Offerlane	Mountmellick
Monaferrick	165	Stradbally	Curraclone	Athy
Monamanry	89	Stradbally	Tullomoy	Athy
Monamonra	429	Clandonagh	Rathdowney	Donaghmore
Monascreeban	293	Ballyadams	Ballyadams	Athy
Monasop	239	Upperwoods	Offerlane	Mountmellick
Monavea	1,004	Slievemargy	Killabban	Carlow
Mondrehid	393	Upperwoods	Offerlane	Abbeyleix
Monebrock	170	Ballyadams	Tankardstown	Athy
Monelly	142	Upperwoods	Offerlane	Mountmellick
Money Lower	240	Stradbally	Fossy or Timahoe	Athy
Money Upper	150	Stradbally	Fossy or Timahoe	Athy
Moneyballytyrrell	41	Maryborough East	Borris	Mountmellick
Moneycleare	214	Cullenagh	Rosconnell	Abbeyleix
Moneycleare	38	Cullenagh	Dysartgallen	Abbeyleix
Moneymore	316	Clandonagh	Kyle	Donaghmore
Moneyquid	768	Tinnahinch	Castlebrack	Mountmellick
Monicknew	660	Upperwoods	Offerlane	Mountmellick
Monnagh	243	Upperwoods	Offerlane	Mountmellick
Monure	106	Slievemargy	Killeshin	Carlow
Morett	1,938	Portnahinch	Coolbanagher	Mountmellick
Mountainfarm	625	Upperwoods	Offerlane	Mountmellick
Mounteagle	348	Cullenagh	Clonenagh and Clonagheen	Abbeyleix
Mounteagle	124	Cullenagh	Ballyroan	Abbeyleix
Mountfead	253	Maryborough West	Clonenagh and Clonagheen	Abbeyleix
Mounthall	189	Upperwoods	Offerlane	Mountmellick
**Mountmellick**	Town	Portnahinch	Ardea	Mountmellick
**Mountmellick**	Town	Tinnahinch	Rosenallis	Mountmellick
Mountoliver	59	Clandonagh	Rathsaran	Donaghmore
Mountoliver	8	Clandonagh	Rathdowney	Donaghmore
**Mountrath**	Town	Maryborough West	Clonenagh and Clonagheen	Mountmellick
Mountrath	1,186	Maryborough West	Clonenagh and Clonagheen	Mountmellick
Mountrath	240	Upperwoods	Offerlane	Mountmellick
Moyadd	724	Cullenagh	Dysartgallen	Abbeyleix
Moyanna	258	Stradbally	Moyanna	Athy
Moyne	287	Clarmallagh	Durrow	Abbeyleix
Mucklone	328	Tinnahinch	Castlebrack	Mountmellick
Mullaghanard (or Derreen)	188	Tinnahinch	Rosenallis	Mountmellick
Mullaghmore	273	Ballyadams	Rathaspick	Athy
Nealstown (or Ballaghlyragh)	148	Upperwoods	Offerlane	Mountmellick
Newtown	842	Clarmallagh	Aghmacart	Abbeyleix
Newtown	309	Upperwoods	Offerlane	Abbeyleix
Newtown	158	Stradbally	Stradbally	Athy
Newtown (or Skirk)	599	Clandonagh	Skirk	Donaghmore
Northgrove	188	Upperwoods	Offerlane	Mountmellick
Nutgrove	177	Tinnahinch	Rosenallis	Mountmellick
Nyra	268	Tinnahinch	Rosenallis	Mountmellick
Ockanaroe	108	Maryborough West	Clonenagh and Clonagheen	Mountmellick
Oldborris	112	Upperwoods	Offerlane	Abbeyleix
Oldcamp	98	Clandonagh	Kyle	Roscrea
Oldcourt	155	Ballyadams	Killabban	Athy
Oldderrig	343	Slievemargy	Killeshin	Carlow
Oldglass	754	Clarmallagh	Aghaboe	Donaghmore
Oldglass	172	Clarmallagh	Bordwell	Donaghmore
Oldleagh	222	Slievemargy	Killabban	Carlow
Oldmill	330	Stradbally	Dysartenos	Athy
Oldtown	764	Clarmallagh	Aghmacart	Abbeyleix
Oldtown	420	Maryborough West	Clonenagh and Clonagheen	Abbeyleix
Oldtown	98	Clandonagh	Rathsaran	Donaghmore
Omoresforest	1,074	Maryborough West	Clonenagh and Clonagheen	Mountmellick
Orchard Lower	390	Cullenagh	Fossy or Timahoe	Abbeyleix
Orchard Upper	91	Cullenagh	Fossy or Timahoe	Abbeyleix
Oughaval	327	Stradbally	Stradbally	Athy
Paddock	568	Upperwoods	Offerlane	Mountmellick
Pallas Big	556	Maryborough East	Clonenagh and Clonagheen	Mountmellick
Pallas Little	339	Maryborough East	Clonenagh and Clonagheen	Mountmellick
Palmershill	201	Clarmallagh	Aghaboe	Donaghmore
Park	241	Stradbally	Curraclone	Athy
Park	121	Clarmallagh	Aghaboe	Abbeyleix
Park	118	Clandonagh	Rathsaran	Donaghmore
Park	15	Clarmallagh	Killermogh	Abbeyleix
Park (or Dunamase)	338	Maryborough East	Dysartenos	Mountmellick
Park Lower	199	Stradbally	Dysartenos	Athy
Park Upper	426	Stradbally	Dysartenos	Athy
Parkahoughill	187	Ballyadams	Ballyadams	Athy
Parkavilla	170	Maryborough West	Clonenagh and Clonagheen	Abbeyleix
Parkbawn	60	Clarmallagh	Abbeyleix	Abbeyleix
Parkbeg	242	Tinnahinch	Castlebrack	Mountmellick
Parknahown	415	Clarmallagh	Aghmacart	Abbeyleix
Pass	228	Cullenagh	Ballyroan	Abbeyleix
Pass	126	Cullenagh	Kilcolmanbane	Abbeyleix
Peafield	209	Upperwoods	Offerlane	Abbeyleix
Pilgramhill	40	Upperwoods	Offerlane	Abbeyleix
Poormansbridge	277	Cullenagh	Abbeyleix	Abbeyleix
**Portarlington**	Town	Portnahinch	Lea	Mountmellick
Portnahinch	175	Portnahinch	Ardea	Mountmellick
Portree	119	Stradbally	Curraclone	Athy
Powelstown	107	Stradbally	Dysartenos	Athy
Powelstown	43	Stradbally	Fossy or Timahoe	Athy
Quarryfarm (or Drimhill)	71	Upperwoods	Offerlane	Mountmellick
Quarrymount	117	Tinnahinch	Castlebrack	Mountmellick
Raggettstown	293	Cullenagh	Dysartgallen	Abbeyleix
Rahanavannagh	596	Cullenagh	Ballyroan	Abbeyleix
Rahandrick Lower	96	Clarmallagh	Bordwell	Donaghmore
Rahandrick Upper	299	Clarmallagh	Bordwell	Donaghmore
Raheen	201	Maryborough West	Clonenagh and Clonagheen	Abbeyleix
Raheen	155	Maryborough East	Kilteale	Mountmellick
Raheen	26	Clandonagh	Rathdowney	Donaghmore
Raheen (or Charleville)	219	Clandonagh	Kyle	Donaghmore
Raheen Lower	219	Clandonagh	Donaghmore	Donaghmore
Raheen Upper	238	Clandonagh	Donaghmore	Donaghmore
Raheenabrogue	290	Cullenagh	Ballyroan	Abbeyleix
Raheenahoran	270	Maryborough East	Kilteale	Mountmellick
Raheenaniska	461	Stradbally	Moyanna	Athy
Raheenanisky	351	Stradbally	Dysartenos	Athy
Raheenbarnagh	31	Stradbally	Tullomoy	Athy
Raheenduff	348	Stradbally	Dysartenos	Athy
Raheenduff	207	Clarmallagh	Rosconnell	Abbeyleix
Raheenduff Big	319	Cullenagh	Fossy or Timahoe	Abbeyleix
Raheenduff Little	174	Cullenagh	Fossy or Timahoe	Abbeyleix
Raheenleagh	387	Clarmallagh	Aghmacart	Abbeyleix
Raheennahown	342	Stradbally	Tullomoy	Athy
Raheennahown North	157	Stradbally	Moyanna	Athy
Raheennahown South	38	Stradbally	Moyanna	Athy
Raheenphelan Glebe	142	Clandonagh	Donaghmore	Donaghmore
Raheensheara	60	Clandonagh	Donaghmore	Donaghmore
Raheensheara	51	Clandonagh	Rathdowney	Donaghmore
Rahin	627	Ballyadams	Killabban	Athy
Ralish	430	Cullenagh	Dysartgallen	Abbeyleix
Rapla	367	Clarmallagh	Aghmacart	Abbeyleix
Rappa	146	Slievemargy	Shrule	Carlow
Rath	215	Clarmallagh	Durrow	Abbeyleix
Rathaspick	95	Ballyadams	Rathaspick	Athy
Rathbrennan	141	Maryborough East	Straboe	Mountmellick
Rathcoffey	189	Tinnahinch	Rearymore	Mountmellick
Rathcrea	404	Stradbally	Moyanna	Athy
**Rathdowney**	Town	Clandonagh	Rathdowney	Donaghmore
Rathdowney	553	Clandonagh	Rathdowney	Donaghmore
Rathduff	114	Slievemargy	Shrule	Carlow
Rathduff	40	Slievemargy	Killeshin	Carlow
Ratherrig	246	Ballyadams	Ballyadams	Athy
Ratheven	158	Maryborough East	Borris	Mountmellick
Ratheven	25	Maryborough East	Straboe	Mountmellick
Rathgilbert	512	Ballyadams	Ballyadams	Athy
Rathleague	527	Maryborough East	Kilcolmanbane	Mountmellick
Rathleague	93	Maryborough East	Straboe	Mountmellick
Rathleash	322	Portnahinch	Lea	Mountmellick
Rathmakelly Glebe	197	Clarmallagh	Killermogh	Abbeyleix
Rathmiles	179	Portnahinch	Lea	Mountmellick
Rathmore	409	Clandonagh	Donaghmore	Donaghmore
Rathmore	407	Stradbally	Stradbally	Athy
Rathmore	175	Ballyadams	Ballyadams	Athy
Rathmoyle	774	Cullenagh	Abbeyleix	Abbeyleix
Rathnaleugh	269	Clandonagh	Rathdowney	Donaghmore
Rathnamanagh	391	Maryborough East	Borris	Mountmellick
Rathphelan	222	Upperwoods	Offerlane	Abbeyleix
Rathpiper North	6	Clarmallagh	Rathdowney	Donaghmore
Rathpiper South	92	Clandonagh	Rathdowney	Donaghmore
Rathronshin	827	Portnahinch	Lea	Mountmellick
Rathsaran Glebe	183	Clandonagh	Rathsaran	Donaghmore
Rathtillig	304	Slievemargy	Killabban	Carlow
Reary Beg	947	Tinnahinch	Rearymore	Mountmellick
Reary More	585	Tinnahinch	Rearymore	Mountmellick
Rearyvalley (or Clonygark)	582	Tinnahinch	Rearymore	Mountmellick
Redcastle	510	Maryborough West	Clonenagh and Clonagheen	Mountmellick
Redhills	40	Cullenagh	Abbeyleix	Abbeyleix
Ringstown	1,062	Maryborough West	Clonenagh and Clonagheen	Mountmellick
Rinn	284	Tinnahinch	Rosenallis	Mountmellick
Rosbran	101	Ballyadams	St. John's	Athy
Rosconnell Glebe	155	Clarmallagh	Rosconnell	Abbeyleix
**Rosenallis**	Town	Tinnahinch	Rosenallis	Mountmellick
Rosenallis	66	Tinnahinch	Rosenallis	Mountmellick
Roskeen	938	Tinnahinch	Castlebrack	Mountmellick
Rosnamullane	556	Stradbally	Moyanna	Athy
Ross	498	Tinnahinch	Rearymore	Mountmellick
Ross	65	Maryborough East	Clonenagh and Clonagheen	Mountmellick
Ross (or Barrackquarter)	160	Clarmallagh	Aghmacart	Abbeyleix
Rossadown	314	Upperwoods	Offerlane	Mountmellick
Rossalee	223	Upperwoods	Offerlane	Mountmellick
Rossbaun	381	Clandonagh	Kyle	Roscrea
Rossdarragh	908	Clandonagh	Erke	Donaghmore
Rossdorragha	407	Clandonagh	Kyle	Roscrea
Rossena	299	Slievemargy	Killabban	Carlow
Rosskelton	940	Maryborough West	Clonenagh and Clonagheen	Abbeyleix
Rossleaghan	309	Maryborough East	Borris	Mountmellick
Rossmore	1,734	Slievemargy	Killeshin	Carlow
Rossmore	435	Clandonagh	Rathsaran	Donaghmore
Rossmore	291	Stradbally	Moyanna	Athy
Rossmore	162	Maryborough West	Clonenagh and Clonagheen	Mountmellick
Rossnabarnagh	126	Clandonagh	Kyle	Roscrea
Rossnaclonagh Inside	196	Upperwoods	Offerlane	Mountmellick
Rossnaclonagh Outside	330	Upperwoods	Offerlane	Mountmellick
Rossnacreena	208	Upperwoods	Offerlane	Mountmellick
Rossnadough	234	Upperwoods	Offerlane	Mountmellick
Rossnagad	201	Maryborough West	Clonenagh and Clonagheen	Mountmellick
Rosstillegane	50	Slievemargy	Killabban	Carlow
Roundwood	230	Upperwoods	Offerlane	Mountmellick
Rush Hall	747	Upperwoods	Offerlane	Abbeyleix
Rushes	393	Slievemargy	Killabban	Carlow
Rushin	746	Upperwoods	Offerlane	Mountmellick
Scarroon	738	Tinnahinch	Kilmanman	Mountmellick
Sconce Lower	225	Maryborough West	Clonenagh and Clonagheen	Mountmellick
Sconce Upper	679	Maryborough West	Clonenagh and Clonagheen	Mountmellick
Scotchrath	449	Maryborough West	Clonenagh and Clonagheen	Abbeyleix
Scotland	119	Stradbally	Tullomoy	Athy
Scrub and Glenmaculla	391	Clarmallagh	Aghmacart	Abbeyleix
Sentryhill	457	Clandonagh	Aghaboe	Donaghmore
Shaen	1,024	Maryborough East	Straboe	Mountmellick
Shanahoe	718	Maryborough West	Clonenagh and Clonagheen	Abbeyleix
Shanavaur	212	Upperwoods	Offerlane	Mountmellick
Shanbally	61	Clarmallagh	Aghmacart	Abbeyleix
Shanbeg	198	Tinnahinch	Rosenallis	Mountmellick
Shanboe	458	Clandonagh	Aghaboe	Donaghmore
Shanderry	101	Upperwoods	Offerlane	Mountmellick
Shanganagh Beg	297	Ballyadams	Tankardstown	Athy
Shanganagh Beg More	358	Ballyadams	Tankardstown	Athy
Shangownagh	67	Upperwoods	Offerlane	Abbeyleix
Shanragh	250	Ballyadams	Rathaspick	Athy
Shanvaghey	184	Clarmallagh	Bordwell	Donaghmore
Shanvally	66	Slievemargy	Killeshin	Carlow
Shrule	166	Slievemargy	Shrule	Carlow
Skeagh	326	Clarmallagh	Aghaboe	Donaghmore
Skehanagh	574	Ballyadams	Killabban	Athy
Skerry	1,150	Tinnahinch	Rosenallis	Mountmellick
Skirk (or Newtown)	599	Clandonagh	Skirk	Donaghmore
Skirk Glebe (or Erris)	105	Clandonagh	Skirk	Donaghmore
Slatt Lower	896	Slievemargy	Rathaspick	Carlow
Slatt Upper	857	Slievemargy	Rathaspick	Carlow
Sleaty	442	Slievemargy	Sleaty	Carlow
**Sleatycraigue**	Town	Slievemargy	Killeshin	Carlow
Southfield	216	Ballyadams	Ballyadams	Athy
Spaquarter	177	Clarmallagh	Aghmacart	Abbeyleix
Springfield	214	Maryborough West	Clonenagh and Clonagheen	Mountmellick
Springfield (or Knockkyle)	396	Clarmallagh	Aghaboe	Abbeyleix
Springhill	782	Slievemargy	Killeshin	Carlow
Springhill	170	Upperwoods	Offerlane	Donaghmore
Springmount	165	Maryborough West	Clonenagh and Clonagheen	Abbeyleix
Srah	532	Clarmallagh	Erke	Donaghmore
Srahanboy	707	Upperwoods	Offerlane	Mountmellick
Srahbaun	226	Clarmallagh	Erke	Donaghmore
Srahcullen	291	Tinnahinch	Rearymore	Mountmellick
Srahduff Glebe	229	Tinnahinch	Kilmanman	Mountmellick
Srahleagh	231	Tinnahinch	Rosenallis	Mountmellick
Srahleagh	197	Clarmallagh	Erke	Donaghmore
Sronagh	55	Portnahinch	Ardea	Mountmellick
Sronscull	181	Ballyadams	Ballyadams	Athy
Stanney	110	Slievemargy	Killeshin	Carlow
Stewartsgrove	115	Clarmallagh	Abbeyleix	Abbeyleix
Stewartsgrove	19	Clarmallagh	Durrow	Abbeyleix
Stooagh	387	Upperwoods	Offerlane	Mountmellick
Straboe	575	Maryborough East	Straboe	Mountmellick
**Stradbally**	Town	Stradbally	Stradbally	Athy
Stradbally	522	Stradbally	Stradbally	Athy
Strahard	625	Portnahinch	Ardea	Mountmellick
Summergrove (or Garroon)	239	Tinnahinch	Rosenallis	Mountmellick
Summerhill (or Aghnaharna)	134	Maryborough East	Borris	Mountmellick
Swan	96	Clarmallagh	Durrow	Abbeyleix
Tankardstown	949	Ballyadams	Tankardstown	Athy
Tarbert	190	Maryborough West	Clonenagh and Clonagheen	Abbeyleix
Templequain	376	Clandonagh	Rathdowney	Donaghmore
The Derries	234	Upperwoods	Offerlane	Abbeyleix
The Derries (or Ballyshaneduff)	618	Portnahinch	Lea	Mountmellick
Timahoe	510	Cullenagh	Fossy or Timahoe	Abbeyleix
Timogue	682	Stradbally	Timogue	Athy
Tinnaclohy	167	Clandonagh	Rathdowney	Donaghmore
Tinnahinch	2,908	Tinnahinch	Rearymore	Mountmellick
Tinnakill	800	Portnahinch	Ardea	Mountmellick
Tinnakill	682	Upperwoods	Offerlane	Mountmellick
Tinnakill	142	Maryborough West	Clonenagh and Clonagheen	Abbeyleix
Tinnaragh	23	Clarmallagh	Aghaboe	Donaghmore
Tinnaragh	16	Clarmallagh	Bordwell	Donaghmore
Tinnaraheen	180	Clarmallagh	Aghaboe	Abbeyleix
Tinnasragh	129	Slievemargy	Killabban	Carlow
Tinneel	174	Tinnahinch	Rosenallis	Mountmellick
Tintore	664	Clarmallagh	Killermogh	Abbeyleix
Tintore	181	Clarmallagh	Aghaboe	Abbeyleix
Tinwear	406	Clarmallagh	Durrow	Abbeyleix
Tirenan	444	Slievemargy	Killabban	Carlow
Tirhogar	566	Portnahinch	Lea	Mountmellick
Toberboe (or Kilkenny More)	621	Clarmallagh	Aghmacart	Abbeyleix
Togher	831	Maryborough East	Borris	Mountmellick
Tomoclavin	123	Stradbally	Tullomoy	Athy
Tonafarna	263	Stradbally	Moyanna	Athy
Tonduff	704	Cullenagh	Abbeyleix	Abbeyleix
Tooreagh	24	Clarmallagh	Aghaboe	Donaghmore
Toortaun	99	Upperwoods	Offerlane	Abbeyleix
Towlerton	1,054	Slievemargy	Killabban	Carlow
Townparks	773	Tinnahinch	Rosenallis	Mountmellick
Townparks	695	Clandonagh	Aghaboe	Donaghmore
Trumra	1,444	Maryborough West	Clonenagh and Clonagheen	Mountmellick
Tubbrid	174	Clandonagh	Kyle	Roscrea
Tullacommon	101	Clandonagh	Donaghmore	Donaghmore
Tullaghan	116	Portnahinch	Lea	Mountmellick
Tullomoy	677	Ballyadams	Tullomoy	Athy
Tullore	199	Cullenagh	Ballyroan	Abbeyleix
Tullyroe	713	Cullenagh	Abbeyleix	Abbeyleix
Turfarney	255	Clarmallagh	Coolkerry	Abbeyleix
Turra	689	Slievemargy	Killabban	Carlow
Tursalla	42	Stradbally	Stradbally	Athy
Ullard (or Controversyland)	223	Portnahinch	Lea	Mountmellick
Vicarstown (Cosby)	781	Stradbally	Moyanna	Athy
Vicarstown (Dodd)	1,278	Stradbally	Moyanna	Athy
Watercastle	284	Clarmallagh	Abbeyleix	Abbeyleix
Whitebog	283	Ballyadams	Ballyadams	Athy
Whitefield	178	Upperwoods	Offerlane	Mountmellick
Windsor (or Cappaghnahoran)	269	Upperwoods	Offerlane	Abbeyleix
Wolfhill	156	Ballyadams	Rathaspick	Athy
Woodland (or Garragh)	209	Slievemargy	Killabban	Carlow
Wranglestown	123	Tinnahinch	Kilmanman	Mountmellick
