= William Redmond =

William Redmond may refer to:

== People ==
In chronological order.

=== Business ===
- William Redmond (merchant) (1804–1874), Irish-born American merchant

=== Sports ===
- Billy Redmond or William T. Redmond, (1853–1894), St. Louis Red Stockings shortstop

=== Crime ===
- William Henry Redmond (1922–1992), American child molester and suspected serial killer
- William Patrick Redmond (1934–1980), American man murdered in Arizona

=== Politicians ===
==== United Kingdom ====
- William Redmond (Irish politician, born 1825) (1825–1880), Irish nationalist politician, father of John Redmond
- Willie Redmond or William Hoey Kearney Redmond (1861–1917), Irish nationalist politician, son of the above.
- William Redmond (Irish politician, born 1886) (1886–1932), Irish nationalist politician, nephew of the above.

==== United States ====
- William A. Redmond (1908–1992), Illinois Democratic politician
- Bill Redmond (born 1955), Republican member of the U.S. House of Representatives from New Mexico

== See also ==
- Redmond (name)
