= Reedman =

Reedman is a surname. Notable people with the surname include:

- Harry Reedman, head of the Rhodesian mission in Lisbon
- Jack Reedman (1865–1924), Australian sportsman
- John Noel Reedman (1905–1994), English-South African diplomat

== See also ==
- Readman
- Reedman, a Decepticon in the Transformers film series
- Redman
