= Reddan =

Reddan is a surname. Notable people with the surname include:

- Eoin Reddan (born 1980), Irish rugby union player
- John Reddan (born 1979), Irish hurler and Gaelic footballer

== See also ==
- Redman (surname)
