= Radman =

Radman may refer to:

- Radman, Yemen, village in San‘a’ Governorate
- RaD Man, pseudonym of Christian Wirth, American computer artist and historian

== People with the name ==
- Miroslav Radman (born 1944), Croatian biologist
- Velimir Radman (born 1983), Croatian footballer
- Gordan Grlić-Radman, Croatian foreign minister

== See also ==
- Radmanović
