= Redmain =

Redmain may refer to:

- Red Main, a river in Germany
- Redmain, Cumbria, a hamlet in England

== See also ==
- Redmayne
