= Redmon =

Redmon may refer to:

== Places ==
- Redmon, Illinois, a United States village

== People ==
- Anthony Redmon
- David Redmon
- Dusty Redmon
- Ginger Redmon
- Jessie Redmon Fauset
- Joseph Redmon
- Redmon & Vale

== See also ==
- Redmond (disambiguation)
- Redman (disambiguation)
- Redmen (disambiguation)
