= Redman =

Redman may refer to:

== People ==
- Redman (surname)
- Redman (rapper) (born 1970), American vocalist, producer, and actor
  - Method Man & Redman
- Red Dragon (musician) (c. 1966 – 2015), Jamaican deejay Leroy May, who initially worked under the name Redman

== Places ==
United States

- Redman, Michigan
- Redman, Missouri, an unincorporated community in Macon County
- Redman, Scott County, Missouri, a ghost town

== Other uses ==
- Homo Sovieticus, people whose minds are shaped by living in the Soviet Union
- Red Man, an American brand of chewing tobacco
- Red man syndrome, a reaction to the antibiotic vancomycin
- Redman (TV series), a Japanese tokusatsu television series
  - Redman: The Kaiju Hunter (comic book), a comic book by Matt Frank and Gonçalo Lopes based on the tokusatsu series
- The Gospel of the Redman, a 1936 book by Ernest Thompson Seton
- Red man, a symbol on traffic lights that signal pedestrians to stop
- A variation of the term redskin
- Red Man, member of Improved Order of Red Men

== See also ==
- Redmen (disambiguation)
- Redmon (disambiguation)
- Redmond (disambiguation)
- Crispa Redmanizers, a Filipino basketball team
