= List of townlands of County Carlow =

This is a sortable table of the approximately 600 townlands in County Carlow, Ireland.

Duplicate names occur where there is more than one townland with the same name in the county. Names marked in bold typeface are towns and villages, and the word Town appears for those entries in the Acres column.

== Townland list ==
Townland	Acres	Barony	Civil parish	Poor law union
Acaun	1	Rathvilly	Rathvilly	Baltinglass
Aclare	632	Forth	Myshall	Carlow
Agha	783	Idrone East	Agha	Carlow
Aghabeg	283	Idrone East	Sliguff	Carlow
Aghade	266	Forth	Aghade	Carlow
Aghanure	171	Carlow	Painestown	Carlow
Agharue	715	Idrone West	Tullowcreen	Carlow
Aghnaglear	626	St. Mullin's Lower	St. Mullin's	New Ross
Aghwater	98	Carlow	Grangeford	Carlow
Altimont	146	Forth	Aghade	Carlow
Annagar	404	Idrone West	Oldleighlin	Carlow
Ardattin	196	Forth	Ardoyne	Carlow
Ardbearn	126	Forth	Ballyellin	Carlow
Ardbearn & Torman	121	Forth	Kellistown	Carlow
Ardnehue	654	Carlow	Killerrig	Carlow
Ardristan	858	Rathvilly	Ardristan	Carlow
**Bagenalstown**	Town	Idrone East	Dunleckny	Carlow
Bahana	824	St. Mullin's Lower	St. Mullin's	New Ross
Ballaghaclay	281	Rathvilly	Clonmore	Shillelagh
Ballaghaderneen	328	Idrone East	Fennagh	Carlow
Ballaghmore	471	Forth	Myshall	Carlow
Ballinabranagh	784	Idrone West	Cloydagh	Carlow
Ballinacarrig	313	Carlow	Ballinacarrig	Carlow
Ballinacrea	351	Forth	Myshall	Carlow
Ballinadrum	335	Forth	Fennagh	Carlow
Ballinagilky	331	Rathvilly	Clonmore	Shillelagh
Ballinamona (or Ballyellin)	143	Idrone East	Kiltennell	New Ross
Ballinastraw	300	Forth	Ardoyne	Carlow
Ballinkillin	782	Idrone East	Lorum	Carlow
Ballinree	831	Idrone East	Sliguff	Carlow
Ballinrush	546	Forth	Myshall	Carlow
Ballintemple	970	Forth	Ardoyne	Carlow
Ballintrane	121	Forth	Fennagh	Carlow
Ballintrane	547	Forth	Templepeter	Carlow
Ballinvally	216	Forth	Ballon	Carlow
Ballinvally	427	Forth	Barragh	Enniscorthy
Ballinvally and Kiltennell	298	Idrone East	Kiltennell	New Ross
**Ballon**	Town	Forth	Ballon	Carlow
Ballon	322	Forth	Ballon	Carlow
Ballybannon	416	Carlow	Killerrig	Carlow
Ballybar Lower	465	Carlow	Clonmelsh	Carlow
Ballybar Upper	491	Carlow	Clonmelsh	Carlow
Ballybeg (or Leagh)	148	Forth	Tullowmagimma	Carlow
Ballybeg Big	1,204	St. Mullin's Lower	St. Mullin's	New Ross
Ballybeg Little	127	St. Mullin's Lower	St. Mullin's	New Ross
Ballybit Big	656	Rathvilly	Rathvilly	Baltinglass
Ballybit Little	119	Rathvilly	Rathvilly	Baltinglass
Ballyblake	21	St. Mullin's Lower	St. Mullin's	New Ross
Ballybrack	544	St. Mullin's Lower	Ballyellin	New Ross
**Ballybrommell**	Town	Idrone East	Fennagh	Carlow
Ballybrommell	373	Idrone East	Fennagh	Carlow
Ballycallon (or Clonbulloge)	139	Forth	Fennagh	Carlow
Ballycarney	321	Carlow	Ballinacarrig	Carlow
Ballycook	484	Rathvilly	Kineagh	Baltinglass
Ballycoppigan	108	Idrone East	Clonygoose	Carlow
Ballycormick	370	Idrone East	Lorum	Carlow
Ballycormick	166	Idrone East	Sliguff	Carlow
Ballycrinnigan	1,223	St. Mullin's Lower	St. Mullin's	New Ross
Ballycrogue	370	Carlow	Ballycrogue	Carlow
Ballycurragh	80	Forth	Gilbertstown	Carlow
Ballydarton	212	Idrone East	Fennagh	Carlow
Ballyduff	310	Rathvilly	Clonmore	Shillelagh
Ballyedmond	417	Rathvilly	Hacketstown	Shillelagh
**Ballyellin**	Town	Idrone East	Ballyellin	Carlow
Ballyellin (or Ballinamona)	143	Idrone East	Kiltennell	New Ross
Ballyellin and Tomdarragh	1,067	Idrone East	Ballyellin	Carlow
Ballyfeanan (or Ballywhinnin)	134	Idrone East	Ballyellin	Carlow
Ballyfeanan (or Ballywhinnin)	273	Idrone East	Clonygoose	Carlow
Ballygarret (or Sandbrook)	258	Forth	Ballon	Carlow
Ballyglisheen	746	St. Mullin's Lower	St. Mullin's	New Ross
Ballygowan	70	Idrone West	Cloydagh	Carlow
Ballygowan	282	Idrone West	Tullowcreen	Carlow
Ballygraney	65	Idrone East	Ballyellin	Carlow
Ballyhacket Lower	462	Rathvilly	Kineagh	Baltinglass
Ballyhacket Upper	268	Rathvilly	Kineagh	Baltinglass
Ballyhegan	132	St. Mullin's Lower	St. Mullin's	New Ross
Ballyhubbock (or Upton)	260	Idrone East	Fennagh	Carlow
Ballyine	476	St. Mullin's Lower	Ullard	New Ross
Ballykealey	106	Forth	Ballyellin	Carlow
Ballykealey	212	Forth	Fennagh	Carlow
Ballykealey	326	Forth	Kellistown	Carlow
Ballykeenan	351	Forth	Barragh	Carlow
Ballykeenan	361	St. Mullin's Lower	Ullard	New Ross
Ballykilduff Lower	253	Rathvilly	Haroldstown	Shillelagh
Ballykilduff Upper	313	Rathvilly	Haroldstown	Shillelagh
Ballykillane	297	Rathvilly	Hacketstown	Shillelagh
Ballyknock	500	St. Mullin's Lower	St. Mullin's	New Ross
**Ballyknockan**	Town	Idrone East	Fennagh	Carlow
Ballyknockan	337	Idrone East	Fennagh	Carlow
Ballyknockan	240	Idrone West	Wells	Carlow
Ballyknockcrumpin	109	St. Mullin's Lower	St. Mullin's	New Ross
Ballyleen	415	Forth	Ballon	Carlow
Ballylennon	321	Carlow	Urglin	Carlow
Ballyling	455	St. Mullin's Lower	St. Mullin's	New Ross
Ballyloo	3	Idrone East	Nurney	Carlow
Ballyloo	688	Carlow	Tullowmagimma	Carlow
Ballyloughan	462	Idrone East	Sliguff	Carlow
Ballylower	189	Forth	Ballon	Carlow
Ballymartin	493	Idrone East	Clonygoose	Carlow
Ballymogue	211	Forth	Ballon	Carlow
Ballymogue	127	Forth	Templepeter	Carlow
Ballymoon	415	Idrone East	Dunleckny	Carlow
**Ballymurphy**	Town	St. Mullin's Lower	St. Mullin's	New Ross
Ballymurphy	424	Rathvilly	Tullowphelim	Carlow
Ballymurphy	94	St. Mullin's Lower	St. Mullin's	New Ross
Ballynaboley	380	Idrone East	Killinane	Carlow
Ballynabranagh (or Walshstown)	465	St. Mullin's Lower	St. Mullin's	New Ross
Ballynagrane	275	Idrone East	Clonygoose	Carlow
Ballynakill	364	Idrone East	Dunleckny	Carlow
Ballynakill	493	Rathvilly	Clonmore	Shillelagh
Ballynakillbeg	328	Carlow	Urglin	Carlow
Ballynalour	768	St. Mullin's Lower	St. Mullin's	New Ross
Ballynamire	38	Idrone East	Fennagh	Carlow
Ballynasillog	386	Idrone East	Clonygoose	Carlow
Ballynattin	229	Idrone East	Kiltennell	Carlow
Ballynoe (or Newtown)	573	Forth	Ardoyne	Carlow
Ballynolan	76	Idrone West	Oldleighlin	Carlow
Ballynunnery	191	Forth	Gilbertstown	Carlow
Ballyoliver	498	Rathvilly	Rathvilly	Baltinglass
Ballypierce	626	St. Mullin's Upper	Barragh	Shillelagh
Ballyredmond	807	St. Mullin's Upper	Moyacomb	Shillelagh
Ballyroughan Big	283	St. Mullin's Lower	Ullard	New Ross
Ballyroughan Little	81	St. Mullin's Lower	Ullard	New Ross
Ballyryan	397	Idrone East	Nurney	Carlow
Ballyryan	125	Carlow	Tullowmagimma	Carlow
Ballysallagh Lower	319	Rathvilly	Hacketstown	Shillelagh
Ballysallagh Upper	358	Rathvilly	Hacketstown	Shillelagh
Ballyshancarragh	301	St. Mullin's Upper	Barragh	Shillelagh
Ballyshane	603	Rathvilly	Crecrin	Shillelagh
Ballytarsna	785	Carlow	Nurney	Carlow
Ballyteigelea	367	Idrone East	Ballyellin	Carlow
Ballyteigelea	194	Idrone East	Clonygoose	Carlow
Ballyteigelea	72	Idrone East	Ullard	Carlow
Ballytimmin	149	Idrone East	Fennagh	Carlow
Ballyvangour	131	Rathvilly	Ardoyne	Shillelagh
Ballyveal	196	Forth	Kellistown	Carlow
Ballyvergal	109	Carlow	Urglin	Carlow
Ballyvolden	56	Forth	Ballon	Carlow
Ballywhinnin (or Ballyfeanan)	134	Idrone East	Ballyellin	Carlow
Ballywhinnin (or Ballyfeanan)	273	Idrone East	Clonygoose	Carlow
Ballywilliamroe	1,074	Idrone East	Dunleckny	Carlow
Bannagagole	526	Idrone West	Oldleighlin	Carlow
Barnahask	466	Forth	Barragh	Enniscorthy
Barnahaskin	217	Idrone East	Kiltennell	New Ross
Barnhill	199	Rathvilly	Rathvilly	Baltinglass
Barragh	120	Forth	Barragh	Enniscorthy
Bauck	193	St. Mullin's Lower	St. Mullin's	New Ross
Baunleath	62	Idrone West	Oldleighlin	Carlow
Baunogenasraid	231	Carlow	Grangeford	Carlow
Baunogephlure	314	Carlow	Grangeford	Carlow
Baunreagh	712	Idrone West	Oldleighlin	Carlow
Bealalaw	553	Forth	Myshall	Carlow
Bellmount	178	Rathvilly	Clonmore	Shillelagh
Bellshill	158	Rathvilly	Clonmore	Shillelagh
Bendinstown	215	Forth	Ballyellin	Carlow
Bennekerry	268	Carlow	Ballinacarrig	Carlow
Bennekerry	361	Carlow	Urglin	Carlow
Bestfield (or Dunganstown)	55	Carlow	Carlow	Carlow
Bestfield (or Dunganstown)	101	Carlow	Painestown	Carlow
Bettyfield (or Ricketstown)	198	Rathvilly	Kineagh	Baltinglass
Blackhill	204	Rathvilly	Clonmore	Shillelagh
Blindennis	90	Rathvilly	Hacketstown	Shillelagh
Boggan	267	Forth	Ballon	Carlow
Boggan	230	Forth	Barragh	Carlow
Boghouse	77	Idrone East	Fennagh	Carlow
Boherduff	489	Idrone East	Dunleckny	Carlow
Bohermore	468	Idrone East	Dunleckny	Carlow
Booladurragh	104	Idrone East	Myshall	Carlow
Boolyrathornan (or Tomard)	286	Idrone West	Tullowcreen	Carlow
Boolyvannanan	383	Idrone West	Tullowcreen	Carlow
Borough	172	Rathvilly	Hacketstown	Shillelagh
**Borris**	Town	Idrone East	Clonygoose	Carlow
Borris	1,221	Idrone East	Clonygoose	Carlow
Bough	403	Rathvilly	Rahill	Baltinglass
Broomville (or Clonachona)	236	Forth	Ardoyne	Carlow
Broughillstown	428	Rathvilly	Rahill	Baltinglass
Brownbog	209	Rathvilly	Hacketstown	Shillelagh
Bunnagurragh	52	Forth	Barragh	Enniscorthy
Burgage	83	Idrone West	Wells	Carlow
Burtonhall Demesne	162	Carlow	Killerrig	Carlow
Burtonhall Demesne	121	Carlow	Urglin	Carlow
Busherstown	688	Carlow	Killerrig	Carlow
Butlersgrange	735	Rathvilly	Tullowphelim	Carlow
Cannonsquarter	199	Rathvilly	Fennagh	Carlow
Cappagh	229	Forth	Ballon	Carlow
Cappawater	97	Forth	Myshall	Carlow
**Carlow**	Town	Carlow	Carlow	Carlow
Carlow	978	Carlow	Carlow	Carlow
Carrarea	141	Rathvilly	Clonmore	Shillelagh
**Carrickduff**	Town	Forth	Barragh	Enniscorthy
Carrickduff	697	Forth	Barragh	Enniscorthy
Carrickslaney	452	Forth	Aghade	Carlow
Carrickslaney	12	Forth	Ballon	Carlow
Carrig Beg	258	Idrone East	Dunleckny	Carlow
Carrig More	179	Idrone East	Dunleckny	Carlow
Carriglead	446	St. Mullin's Lower	St. Mullin's	New Ross
Carrignafecka	98	Idrone East	Sliguff	Carlow
Carrigpark	128	Idrone East	Dunleckny	Carlow
Cashel	294	Idrone East	Kiltennell	Carlow
Castlegrace	331	Forth	Aghade	Carlow
Castlegrace	139	Forth	Ballon	Carlow
Castlemore	938	Rathvilly	Fennagh	Carlow
Castletown	485	Carlow	Tullowmagimma	Carlow
Chapelstown	466	Carlow	Clonmelsh	Carlow
Clanagh	33	St. Mullin's Lower	St. Mullin's	New Ross
Clashganny	176	Idrone East	Myshall	Carlow
Cloghna	792	Carlow	Cloydagh	Carlow
Cloghristick	472	Carlow	Cloydagh	Carlow
Cloghristick	28	Carlow	Killerrig	Carlow
Clogrenan	1,485	Idrone West	Cloydagh	Carlow
Clomoney	233	Idrone East	Ballyellin	Carlow
Clomoney	133	Idrone East	Clonygoose	Carlow
Clomoney	149	Idrone East	Lorum	Carlow
Clonachona (or Broomville)	236	Forth	Ardoyne	Carlow
Clonacur	70	Idrone East	Dunleckny	Carlow
Clonbulloge (or Ballycallon)	139	Forth	Fennagh	Carlow
Clonee East	112	Forth	Myshall	Carlow
Clonee West	39	Idrone East	Myshall	Carlow
Cloneen	276	Idrone East	Agha	Carlow
Cloneen	112	Idrone East	Nurney	Carlow
Clonegah	397	Idrone East	Fennagh	Carlow
**Clonegall**	Town	St. Mullin's Upper	Moyacomb	Carlow
Clonegall	299	St. Mullin's Upper	Moyacomb	Shillelagh
Clonetoose	108	Idrone East	Fennagh	Carlow
Clongarran	205	St. Mullin's Upper	Moyacomb	Shillelagh
Clonmashane	160	Forth	Templepeter	Carlow
Clonmelsh	384	Carlow	Clonmelsh	Carlow
Clonmore	115	Idrone West	Oldleighlin	Carlow
Clonmore	169	Rathvilly	Clonmore	Shillelagh
Clonmullen	291	Forth	Barragh	Enniscorthy
Clonogan	543	St. Mullin's Upper	Moyacomb	Shillelagh
Clonygoose	156	Idrone East	Clonygoose	Carlow
Clorusk Lower	144	Idrone West	Killinane	Carlow
Clorusk Upper	246	Idrone West	Killinane	Carlow
Closh	58	Forth	Ballon	Carlow
Closutton	666	Idrone West	Killinane	Carlow
Clowater	106	Idrone East	Ballyellin	Carlow
Clowater	30	Idrone East	Clonygoose	Carlow
Clowater	97	Idrone East	Lorum	Carlow
Commons	202	Forth	Ballon	Carlow
Coneykeare	124	Idrone West	Wells	Carlow
Constablehill	335	Rathvilly	Hacketstown	Shillelagh
Coolalaw	218	Rathvilly	Clonmore	Shillelagh
Coolasnaghta	1,240	Idrone East	Fennagh	Carlow
Coole	289	Rathvilly	Rathvilly	Baltinglass
Coolmanagh Lower	297	Rathvilly	Haroldstown	Shillelagh
Coolmanagh Upper	543	Rathvilly	Haroldstown	Shillelagh
Coolnacuppoge	242	Idrone East	Sliguff	Carlow
Coolnakeeran	190	Idrone West	Oldleighlin	Carlow
Coolnakisha	1,307	Idrone West	Tullowcreen	Carlow
Coolnamara	261	St. Mullin's Lower	Ullard	New Ross
Coolnapish	59	Idrone East	Dunleckny	Carlow
Coolnasheegan	108	Forth	Myshall	Carlow
Coolroe	557	St. Mullin's Upper	Moyacomb	Carlow
Coolyhune	590	St. Mullin's Lower	St. Mullin's	New Ross
Coonogue	931	Idrone East	Kiltennell	New Ross
Coppenagh	596	Rathvilly	Tullowphelim	Carlow
Corries (or Corry More)	42	Idrone East	Sliguff	Carlow
Corries (or Corrymore)	646	Idrone East	Lorum	Carlow
Corry Beg (or Currenree)	301	Idrone East	Sliguff	Carlow
Corry More (or Corries)	42	Idrone East	Sliguff	Carlow
Corrymore (or Corries)	646	Idrone East	Lorum	Carlow
Cournellan	446	St. Mullin's Lower	Ullard	New Ross
Craan	51	Forth	Aghade	Enniscorthy
Craan	477	Forth	Barragh	Enniscorthy
Craanaha	188	Forth	Fennagh	Carlow
Craanlusky	716	Idrone West	Tullowcreen	Carlow
Craanpursheen	103	Forth	Ballon	Carlow
Craans	777	Forth	Ardoyne	Carlow
Cranavonane	757	Idrone West	Tullowcreen	Carlow
Cranemore	1,417	Forth	Barragh	Enniscorthy
Crannagh	1,006	Idrone East	Kiltennell	Carlow
Crecrin	323	Rathvilly	Crecrin	Shillelagh
Croanruss	105	Forth	Myshall	Carlow
Cronaleigh	180	Forth	Barragh	Enniscorthy
Croneskagh Lower	91	Rathvilly	Clonmore	Shillelagh
Croneskagh Upper	250	Rathvilly	Clonmore	Shillelagh
Crosslow (or Mountwolseley)	809	Rathvilly	Tullowphelim	Carlow
Crowsgrove	433	St. Mullin's Upper	Barragh	Shillelagh
Cunaberry	324	Forth	Ballon	Carlow
Curragh	109	Rathvilly	Hacketstown	Shillelagh
Curraghacruit	251	Idrone East	Dunleckny	Carlow
Currane	365	Idrone East	Clonygoose	Carlow
Currenree (or Corry Beg)	301	Idrone East	Sliguff	Carlow
Davisshill	202	Rathvilly	Clonmore	Shillelagh
Deerpark New	757	Forth	Barragh	Enniscorthy
Deerpark Old	727	Forth	Barragh	Enniscorthy
Demesne	108	Idrone West	Oldleighlin	Carlow
Donore	236	Idrone East	Lorum	Carlow
Donore	463	Idrone East	Sliguff	Carlow
Downings	691	Rathvilly	Tullowphelim	Carlow
Dranagh	1,074	Bantry	St. Mullin's	New Ross
Drisoge	55	Forth	Ballon	Carlow
Drumfea	433	Idrone East	Fennagh	Carlow
Drumguin	255	Rathvilly	Hacketstown	Shillelagh
Drummin	797	St. Mullin's Lower	St. Mullin's	New Ross
Duffery	326	Rathvilly	Haroldstown	Shillelagh
Dukespark (or Sherwood)	334	Forth	Barragh	Enniscorthy
Dunganstown (or Bestfield)	55	Carlow	Carlow	Carlow
Dunganstown (or Bestfield)	101	Carlow	Painestown	Carlow
Dunleckny	481	Idrone East	Dunleckny	Carlow
Dunroe	700	Idrone East	Sliguff	Carlow
Eaglehill	303	Rathvilly	Clonmore	Shillelagh
Eaglehill	154	Rathvilly	Hacketstown	Shillelagh
Eaglehill (Newton)	161	Rathvilly	Clonmore	Shillelagh
Emlicon	80	Forth	Kellistown	Carlow
Farranacurragh	37	Idrone West	Oldleighlin	Carlow
Farranafreney	136	Idrone West	Killinane	Carlow
Farranaphlure	207	Carlow	Grangeford	Carlow
Feamore	221	Idrone West	Oldleighlin	Carlow
Fennagh	29	Idrone East	Fennagh	Carlow
Fenniscourt	793	Idrone West	Wells	Carlow
Fonthill	156	Idrone West	Cloydagh	Carlow
Friarstown	891	Carlow	Killerrig	Carlow
Garreenleen	329	Forth	Gilbertstown	Carlow
Garrettstown	494	Rathvilly	Rahill	Baltinglass
Garryhill	392	Idrone East	Dunleckny	Carlow
Garryhill	16	Idrone East	Myshall	Carlow
Garryhundon	786	Carlow	Clonmelsh	Carlow
Gilbertstown	142	Forth	Gilbertstown	Carlow
Glannahary	251	Idrone East	Lorum	Carlow
Glannahary	109	Idrone East	Sliguff	Carlow
Glebe	26	Idrone East	Fennagh	Carlow
Glebe	26	Idrone West	Tullowcreen	Carlow
Glebe	48	Forth	Barragh	Enniscorthy
Glebe	33	St. Mullin's Lower	St. Mullin's	New Ross
Glebe	16	Rathvilly	Clonmore	Shillelagh
Glenoge	131	Carlow	Grangeford	Carlow
Gormona	261	Idrone East	Dunleckny	Carlow
Gormona	96	Idrone East	Lorum	Carlow
Gorteengrone	88	Carlow	Urglin	Carlow
Gowlin	685	St. Mullin's Lower	St. Mullin's	New Ross
Graiguealug	142	Forth	Nurney	Carlow
Graiguealug	37	Forth	Templepeter	Carlow
Graiguealug	267	Forth	Tullowmagimma	Carlow
Graiguenaspiddoge	287	Forth	Tullowmagimma	Carlow
Grangeford	353	Carlow	Grangeford	Carlow
Grangeford Old	475	Carlow	Grangeford	Carlow
Grangewat	76	Carlow	Killerrig	Carlow
Greenane	67	Carlow	Killerrig	Carlow
**Hacketstown**	Town	Rathvilly	Hacketstown	Shillelagh
Hacketstown Lower	191	Rathvilly	Hacketstown	Shillelagh
Hacketstown Upper	76	Rathvilly	Hacketstown	Shillelagh
Haroldstown	364	Rathvilly	Haroldstown	Shillelagh
Harristown	327	St. Mullin's Lower	St. Mullin's	New Ross
Heath	193	Idrone East	Lorum	Carlow
Huntington	156	St. Mullin's Upper	Moyacomb	Shillelagh
Inch (or Inchaphnea)	83	St. Mullin's Lower	St. Mullin's	New Ross
Inchaphuca (or Inch)	83	St. Mullin's Lower	St. Mullin's	New Ross
Inchisland (or Moatalusha)	233	Carlow	Grangeford	Carlow
Island	75	Rathvilly	Clonmore	Shillelagh
Janeville (or Kilgarron)	232	Idrone East	Fennagh	Carlow
Johnduffswood	431	Idrone West	Oldleighlin	Carlow
Johnstown	766	Carlow	Urglin	Carlow
Kellistown East	868	Carlow	Kellistown	Carlow
Kellistown West	983	Carlow	Kellistown	Carlow
Kernanstown	267	Carlow	Carlow	Carlow
Kernanstown	178	Carlow	Urglin	Carlow
Kilballyhue	385	Carlow	Tullowmagimma	Carlow
Kilbrannish North	837	Forth	Barragh	Enniscorthy
Kilbrannish South	1,822	Forth	Barragh	Enniscorthy
Kilbrickan	191	Forth	Fennagh	Carlow
Kilbrickan	28	Forth	Templepeter	Carlow
Kilbride	255	Forth	Aghade	Carlow
Kilbride	594	Forth	Barragh	Carlow
Kilcarrig	909	Idrone East	Dunleckny	Carlow
Kilcarry	926	St. Mullin's Upper	Moyacomb	Shillelagh
Kilcloney	415	Idrone East	Clonygoose	Carlow
Kilcoltrim	934	Idrone East	Kiltennell	Carlow
Kilconnaught	135	Rathvilly	Hacketstown	Shillelagh
Kilconner	354	Idrone East	Fennagh	Carlow
Kilcoole	295	Forth	Gilbertstown	Carlow
Kilcruit	188	Idrone East	Lorum	Carlow
Kilcummey	133	Idrone East	Ballyellin	Carlow
Kilcummey	299	Idrone East	Clonygoose	Carlow
Kildavin	321	St. Mullin's Upper	Barragh	Shillelagh
Kildreenagh	555	Idrone East	Dunleckny	Carlow
Kilgarron (or Janeville)	232	Idrone East	Fennagh	Carlow
Kilgraney	78	Forth	Aghade	Carlow
Kilgraney	246	Forth	Barragh	Carlow
Kilgraney	890	Idrone East	Lorum	Carlow
Kilkey	181	Forth	Fennagh	Carlow
Kilknock	74	Forth	Ballyellin	Carlow
Kilknock	883	Forth	Kellistown	Carlow
Killalongford	461	Rathvilly	Clonmore	Shillelagh
Killamaster	194	Carlow	Killerrig	Carlow
Killane	6	Forth	Ballyellin	Carlow
Killane	133	Forth	Kellistown	Carlow
**Killedmond**	Town	Idrone East	Kiltennell	Carlow
Killedmond	511	Idrone East	Kiltennell	Carlow
Killeeshal	254	Idrone West	Cloydagh	Carlow
Killenora	139	Carlow	Kellistown	Carlow
Killerrig	821	Carlow	Killerrig	Carlow
Killinane	599	Idrone West	Killinane	Carlow
Killoughternane	516	Idrone East	Sliguff	Carlow
Killyshane	115	Carlow	Urglin	Carlow
Kilmacart	281	Rathvilly	Hacketstown	Shillelagh
Kilmagarvoge	620	Rathvilly	Tullowphelim	Carlow
Kilmaglin	298	Idrone East	Fennagh	Carlow
Kilmaglush	335	Forth	Myshall	Carlow
Kilmeany	344	Carlow	Ballinacarrig	Carlow
Kilmissan	236	St. Mullin's Lower	St. Mullin's	New Ross
Kilmurry	96	Forth	Ballon	Carlow
Kilree	295	Idrone East	Sliguff	Carlow
Kiltennell and Ballinvally	298	Idrone East	Kiltennell	New Ross
Kneestown	201	Carlow	Killerrig	Carlow
Knockagarry	88	Idrone West	Oldleighlin	Carlow
Knockarda	32	Carlow	Urglin	Carlow
Knockballystine	405	Rathvilly	Clonmore	Shillelagh
Knockbarragh	328	Forth	Barragh	Carlow
Knockbaun & Knocknabranagh	711	Idrone West	Oldleighlin	Carlow
Knockbower	209	Carlow	Tullowmagimma	Carlow
Knockboy	431	Rathvilly	Rathvilly	Baltinglass
Knockbrack	377	Forth	Myshall	Carlow
Knockclonagad	776	Idrone East	Sliguff	Carlow
Knockdoorish	290	Forth	Barragh	Carlow
Knockdramagh	424	Forth	Myshall	Carlow
Knockduff (or Marley)	881	St. Mullin's Lower	St. Mullin's	New Ross
Knockeen	374	St. Mullin's Lower	St. Mullin's	New Ross
Knockendrane	742	Idrone East	Fennagh	Carlow
Knockevaghan	680	Rathvilly	Rathvilly	Baltinglass
Knocklishen Beg	319	Rathvilly	Rathvilly	Baltinglass
Knocklishen More	470	Rathvilly	Rathvilly	Baltinglass
Knockmanus	128	Idrone West	Ballyellin	Carlow
Knockmore	380	Idrone East	Ballyellin	New Ross
Knocknabranagh and Knockbaun	711	Idrone West	Oldleighlin	Carlow
Knocknagundarragh (or Scortreen)	272	Idrone East	Clonygoose	Carlow
Knocknatubbrid	303	Forth	Ardoyne	Carlow
Knockroe	112	Rathvilly	Rathvilly	Baltinglass
Knockroe	1,249	Idrone East	Kiltennell	New Ross
Knockscur (or Knocksquire)	713	Idrone East	Kiltennell	Carlow
Knocksquire (or Knockscur)	713	Idrone East	Kiltennell	Carlow
Knockullard	293	Idrone East	Sliguff	Carlow
Knockymullgurry	933	St. Mullin's Lower	St. Mullin's	New Ross
Kyle	256	St. Mullin's Lower	Ballyellin	New Ross
Labanasigh	139	Idrone East	Dunleckny	Carlow
Lackabeg	155	St. Mullin's Upper	Barragh	Shillelagh
Lackan	405	Idrone West	Oldleighlin	Carlow
Lacken	193	Idrone East	Kiltennell	Carlow
Lacken	89	St. Mullin's Lower	St. Mullin's	New Ross
Ladystown	234	Rathvilly	Baltinglass	Baltinglass
Larah	307	Forth	Ballon	Carlow
Lasmaconly	159	Forth	Myshall	Carlow
Leagh (or Ballybeg)	148	Forth	Tullowmagimma	Carlow
Leany	862	St. Mullin's Upper	Moyacomb	Carlow
**Leighlinbridge**	Town	Idrone East	Agha	Carlow
**Leighlinbridge**	Town	Idrone West	Wells	Carlow
Leighlinbridge	302	Idrone East	Agha	Carlow
Linkardstown	498	Carlow	Tullowmagimma	Carlow
Lisgarvan	217	Forth	Gilbertstown	Carlow
Lisnevagh	1,110	Rathvilly	Rathvilly	Baltinglass
Lissalican	548	St. Mullin's Lower	Ballyellin	New Ross
Lorum	349	Idrone East	Lorum	Carlow
Lumcloon	237	Idrone East	Fennagh	Carlow
Maplestown	485	Rathvilly	Rahill	Baltinglass
Marley (or Knockduff)	881	St. Mullin's Lower	St. Mullin's	New Ross
Milltown	402	Forth	Barragh	Carlow
Milltown	336	Idrone East	Fennagh	Carlow
Minvaud Lower	305	Rathvilly	Clonmore	Shillelagh
Minvaud Upper	292	Rathvilly	Clonmore	Shillelagh
Moanacurragh	43	Carlow	Ballinacarrig	Carlow
Moanalow	161	Carlow	Grangeford	Carlow
Moanamanagh	162	Carlow	Grangeford	Carlow
Moanavoth	220	Rathvilly	Rathvilly	Baltinglass
Moanduff	90	Idrone West	Killinane	Carlow
Moanmore	194	Forth	Fennagh	Carlow
Moanmore	618	Idrone West	Oldleighlin	Carlow
Moanmore	74	Idrone West	Wells	Carlow
Moatalusha (or Inchisland)	233	Carlow	Grangeford	Carlow
Mohullen	173	St. Mullin's Lower	Ballyellin	New Ross
Monastill	92	Rathvilly	Hacketstown	Shillelagh
Monaughrim	982	St. Mullin's Upper	Moyacomb	Shillelagh
Moneybeg	363	Idrone East	Dunleckny	Carlow
Moneygrogh	91	Forth	Barragh	Enniscorthy
Moorestown	145	Carlow	Killerrig	Carlow
Mortarstown Lower	206	Carlow	Carlow	Carlow
Mortarstown Upper	400	Carlow	Carlow	Carlow
Mountkelly	446	Rathvilly	Rathvilly	Baltinglass
Mountmelican	61	Idrone East	Fennagh	Carlow
Mountneill	207	Rathvilly	Rathvilly	Baltinglass
Mountpleasant	139	Idrone East	Fennagh	Carlow
Mountwolseley (or Crosslow)	809	Rathvilly	Tullowphelim	Carlow
Moyle Big	521	Carlow	Kellistown	Carlow
Moyle Little	150	Carlow	Kellistown	Carlow
Moyvally	171	Idrone East	Kiltennell	Carlow
Mullannagaun	284	St. Mullin's Lower	St. Mullin's	New Ross
Mullannaskeagh	180	St. Mullin's Lower	St. Mullin's	New Ross
Mullannavode	114	St. Mullin's Lower	St. Mullin's	New Ross
**Myshall**	Town	Forth	Myshall	Carlow
Myshall	970	Forth	Myshall	Carlow
Nashesquarter	211	Rathvilly	Haroldstown	Shillelagh
Newacre	76	Carlow	Painestown	Carlow
Newgarden	209	Carlow	Painestown	Carlow
Newstown	646	Forth	Ardoyne	Carlow
Newtown	887	Idrone East	Agha	Carlow
Newtown	823	St. Mullin's Lower	St. Mullin's	New Ross
Newtown (or Ballynoe)	573	Forth	Ardoyne	Carlow
**Nurney**	Town	Idrone East	Nurney	Carlow
Nurney	209	Idrone East	Agha	Carlow
Nurney	289	Idrone East	Nurney	Carlow
Oakpark (or Painestown)	1,296	Carlow	Painestown	Carlow
**Oldleighlin**	Town	Idrone West	Oldleighlin	Carlow
Oldleighlin	302	Idrone West	Oldleighlin	Carlow
Oldtown	195	Rathvilly	Kineagh	Baltinglass
Oldtown	72	Idrone East	Ballyellin	Carlow
Oldtown	674	Idrone East	Nurney	Carlow
Oldtown	193	Rathvilly	Clonmore	Shillelagh
Orchard	416	St. Mullin's Upper	Moyacomb	Carlow
Orchard	316	Idrone East	Nurney	Carlow
Ouragh	412	Rathvilly	Tullowphelim	Carlow
Owlbeg	71	Idrone East	Clonygoose	Carlow
Painestown (or Oakpark)	1,296	Carlow	Painestown	Carlow
Park	437	Carlow	Ballinacarrig	Carlow
Parknakyle	471	Idrone West	Oldleighlin	Carlow
Patrickswell	205	Rathvilly	Rathvilly	Baltinglass
Phillipstown	253	Rathvilly	Kineagh	Baltinglass
Pollerton Big	381	Carlow	Carlow	Carlow
Pollerton Little	299	Carlow	Carlow	Carlow
Porchavodda	91	Rathvilly	Hacketstown	Shillelagh
Portrushen Lower	339	Rathvilly	Kiltegan	Baltinglass
Portrushen Upper	220	Rathvilly	Kiltegan	Baltinglass
Powerstown	551	Carlow	Clonmelsh	Carlow
Quinagh	643	Carlow	Ballinacarrig	Carlow
Raheen	329	Idrone West	Oldleighlin	Carlow
Raheen	215	Forth	Barragh	Enniscorthy
Raheen	183	Rathvilly	Clonmore	Shillelagh
Raheen	408	Rathvilly	Haroldstown	Shillelagh
Raheenadaw	284	Rathvilly	Kineagh	Baltinglass
Raheendarragh	968	Idrone East	Kiltennell	Carlow
Raheendoran	137	Idrone West	Cloydagh	Carlow
Raheenkillane	213	Forth	Ballyellin	Carlow
Raheenkyle	987	Idrone East	Kiltennell	Carlow
Raheenliegh	918	Forth	Myshall	Carlow
Raheenwood	228	Idrone East	Myshall	Carlow
Raheenwood	302	Idrone West	Oldleighlin	Carlow
Rahill	651	Rathvilly	Rahill	Baltinglass
Rainestown	620	Carlow	Killerrig	Carlow
Rathanna	1,149	Idrone East	Kiltennell	Carlow
Rathbaun	594	Carlow	Grangeford	Carlow
Rathcrogue	422	Carlow	Tullowmagimma	Carlow
Rathdaniel	588	Rathvilly	Kineagh	Baltinglass
Rathduff	383	Idrone East	Dunleckny	Carlow
Rathedan	639	Idrone East	Agha	Carlow
Ratheeragh	207	Forth	Ardoyne	Carlow
Rathellin	739	Idrone East	Agha	Carlow
Rathercan	141	Idrone East	Fennagh	Carlow
Rathgeran	1,151	St. Mullin's Lower	St. Mullin's	New Ross
Rathglass	348	Rathvilly	Tullowphelim	Carlow
Rathlyon	413	Rathvilly	Tullowphelim	Carlow
Rathmore	815	Rathvilly	Rathmore	Baltinglass
Rathnafushoge	256	Rathvilly	Hacketstown	Shillelagh
Rathnageeragh	684	Idrone East	Fennagh	Carlow
Rathnagrew Lower	226	Rathvilly	Hacketstown	Shillelagh
Rathnagrew Upper	380	Rathvilly	Hacketstown	Shillelagh
Rathnapish	368	Carlow	Carlow	Carlow
Rathnashannagh	165	Carlow	Grangeford	Carlow
Rathornan	310	Idrone West	Tullowcreen	Carlow
Rathrush	970	Forth	Gilbertstown	Carlow
Rathoe	877	Forth	Gilbertstown	Carlow
Rathvarrin	434	Forth	Ardoyne	Carlow
**Rathvilly**	Town	Rathvilly	Rathvilly	Baltinglass
Rathvilly	120	Rathvilly	Rathvilly	Baltinglass
Rathvinden	11	Idrone West	Tullowcreen	Carlow
Rathvinden	173	Idrone West	Wells	Carlow
Rathwade	345	Idrone East	Agha	Carlow
Redbog	284	Rathvilly	Clonmore	Shillelagh
Ricketstown	220	Rathvilly	Rahill	Baltinglass
Ricketstown (or Bettyfield)	198	Rathvilly	Kineagh	Baltinglass
Ricketstown North	282	Rathvilly	Kineagh	Baltinglass
Ricketstown South	270	Rathvilly	Kineagh	Baltinglass
Ridge	1,542	Idrone West	Oldleighlin	Carlow
Rocksavage	88	St. Mullin's Lower	St. Mullin's	New Ross
Roscat	712	Rathvilly	Ardristan	Carlow
Rosdellig	369	Idrone East	Kiltennell	Carlow
Rossacurra	431	Forth	Myshall	Carlow
Rosslee	485	Forth	Myshall	Carlow
**Royal Oak**	Town	Idrone West	Killinane	Carlow
Russellstown	349	Carlow	Killerrig	Carlow
Rutland (or Urglin)	726	Carlow	Urglin	Carlow
Sandbrook (or Ballygarret)	258	Forth	Ballon	Carlow
Scortreen (or Knocknagundarragh)	272	Idrone East	Clonygoose	Carlow
Scotland	183	Rathvilly	Hacketstown	Shillelagh
Seskin	74	St. Mullin's Lower	St. Mullin's	New Ross
Seskin Lower	352	Idrone West	Oldleighlin	Carlow
Seskin Upper	690	Idrone West	Oldleighlin	Carlow
Seskinnamadra	693	Idrone East	Sliguff	Carlow
Seskinrea	597	Idrone West	Oldleighlin	Carlow
Seskinryan	475	Idrone East	Dunleckny	Carlow
Seskinryan	86	Idrone East	Lorum	Carlow
Shangarry	678	Forth	Myshall	Carlow
Sheean	262	Forth	Myshall	Carlow
Sherwood (or Dukespark)	334	Forth	Barragh	Enniscorthy
Sherwoodpark	115	Forth	Aghade	Carlow
Sherwoodpark	38	Forth	Barragh	Carlow
Skahanrane	221	Idrone East	Lorum	Carlow
Slaneyquarter	373	Carlow	Grangeford	Carlow
Slievedurda	92	St. Mullin's Lower	St. Mullin's	New Ross
Sliguff	784	Idrone East	Lorum	Carlow
Sliguff	478	Idrone East	Sliguff	Carlow
Spahill	559	Idrone East	Kiltennell	Carlow
Sragh	231	Forth	Ballon	Carlow
St. Mullin's	151	St. Mullin's Lower	St. Mullin's	New Ross
Staplestown	233	Carlow	Ballinacarrig	Carlow
Straboe	1,104	Rathvilly	Straboe	Baltinglass
Straduff	196	Forth	Myshall	Carlow
Stralusky	115	Rathvilly	Haroldstown	Shillelagh
Strawhall	373	Carlow	Carlow	Carlow
Tankardstwon	1,411	Rathvilly	Tullowphelim	Carlow
Templenaboe	154	St. Mullin's Lower	St. Mullin's	New Ross
Templeowen	32	Rathvilly	Fennagh	Carlow
Templepeter	65	Forth	Gilbertstown	Carlow
Templepeter	104	Forth	Templepeter	Carlow
Tiknock	855	Rathvilly	Rathvilly	Baltinglass
Tinnacarrig	676	St. Mullin's Lower	Ullard	New Ross
Tinnaclash	255	Rathvilly	Kiltegan	Baltinglass
Tinnaclash	37	Forth	Templepeter	Carlow
Tinnagarney	211	Idrone West	Wells	Carlow
**Tinnahinch**	Town	St. Mullin's Lower	St. Mullin's	New Ross
Tinnahinch	349	St. Mullin's Lower	St. Mullin's	New Ross
Tinriland	545	Carlow	Tullowmagimma	Carlow
Toberbride	233	Idrone East	Dunleckny	Carlow
Tobinstown	845	Rathvilly	Rathvilly	Baltinglass
Tomard (or Boolyrathornan)	286	Idrone West	Tullowcreen	Carlow
Tomard Lower	495	Idrone West	Tullowcreen	Carlow
Tomard Upper	596	Idrone West	Tullowcreen	Carlow
Tombeagh	700	Rathvilly	Hacketstown	Shillelagh
Tomdarragh and Ballyellin	1,067	Idrone East	Ballyellin	Carlow
Tomduff	241	Idrone East	Kiltennell	Carlow
Tomnaslough	69	Idrone West	Wells	Carlow
Tomnasock	329	Idrone West	Oldleighlin	Carlow
Torman and Ardbearn	121	Forth	Kellistown	Carlow
Tuckamine	111	Rathvilly	Rathvilly	Baltinglass
**Tullow**	Town	Rathvilly	Fennagh	Carlow
**Tullow**	Town	Rathvilly	Tullowphelim	Carlow
Tullowbeg	547	Rathvilly	Fennagh	Carlow
Tullowphelim	1,525	Rathvilly	Tullowphelim	Carlow
Turra	257	St. Mullin's Lower	St. Mullin's	New Ross
Turtane	211	Forth	Myshall	Carlow
Ullard Beg	179	Forth	Myshall	Carlow
Ullard More	284	Forth	Myshall	Carlow
Upton (or Ballyhubbock)	260	Idrone East	Fennagh	Carlow
Urglin (or Rutland)	726	Carlow	Urglin	Carlow
Vermount	312	Rathvilly	Clonmore	Shillelagh
Walshstown (or Ballynabranagh)	465	St. Mullin's Lower	St. Mullin's	New Ross
Waterstown	196	Rathvilly	Rathvilly	Baltinglass
Wells	702	Idrone West	Wells	Carlow
Williamstown	1,112	Rathvilly	Rathvilly	Baltinglass
Woodlands	187	St. Mullin's Upper	Moyacomb	Carlow
Woodside	116	Rathvilly	Hacketstown	Shillelagh
