= Redmond (name) =

Redmond may be a surname or given name, and can refer to the following people:

== Surnames ==
- Aaron Redmond, New Zealand cricketer
- Alex Redmond, American football player
- Bridget Redmond, Irish politician, widow of Wiliam Archer Redmond
- Calista Redmond, CEO of The RISC-V Foundation
- Carol K. Redmond, American biostatistician
- Chandler Redmond (born 1997), American baseball player
- Derek Redmond (born 1965), British athlete
- Dick Redmond, former NHL defenseman
- Elsa Redmond, American archaeologist
- Granville Redmond, was a deaf American landscape painter and actor in silent films
- Harriet Redmond (c.1862–1952), African-American suffragist
- Harry Redmond (baseball) (1887–1960), baseball player with the Brooklyn Superbas
- Harry Redmond (footballer) (1933–1985), English-born footballer who played for Millwall
- Hugh Francis Redmond, American CIA operative
- Ian Redmond, British tropical field biologist and conservationist
- Isobel Redmond, South Australian MP, Liberal leader and Leader of the Opposition
- Jackie Redmond, Canadian sports broadcaster
- Jalen Redmond (born 1999), American football player
- James Redmond (broadcaster), British television executive with the BBC
- James Redmond (actor), British actor
- James Redmond (artist) (1901–1944), American painter KIA WWII
- James F Redmond (1915–1993), American educator and school superintendent
- Jimmy Redmond (born 1977), American football player
- John Edward Redmond, Irish politician, great-uncle to John Redmond
- John Redmond, Irish politician
- Layne Redmond, American musician
- Liam Redmond, Irish actor
- Marge Redmond, American actress
- Martin Redmond, British politician
- Michael Redmond, Canadian politician
- Michael Redmond, Irish comedian and actor
- Michael Redmond, American Go player
- Mickey Redmond, former hockey player and sports announcer
- Mike Redmond, professional baseball player
- Nathan Redmond, English professional footballer who plays for Beşiktaş
- Phil Redmond, British writer and producer
- Sarah-Jane Redmond, Canadian actress born in Cyprus, Greece
- Siobhan Redmond, British actor
- Sophie Redmond, Surinamese physician and activist
- William Archer Redmond, Irish politician, father of John Redmond
- William Redmond, Irish politician, son of John Redmond
- Willie Redmond, Irish politician and soldier, brother of John Redmond

== First name ==
- Redmond Barry (1813–1880), British colonial judge in Victoria, Australia
- Redmond "Red" Gerard, American snowboarder
- Redmond O'Hanlon, British travel writer
- Redmond "Red" Symons, English born Australian musician, television, and radio personality
- Redmond Boyle, character from Command and Conquer 3
- Redmond Mann, character from Team Fortress 2

== See also ==
- Redmond (disambiguation)
