= Radmanović =

Radmanović (Serbian: Радмановић) is a surname. Notable people with the surname include:

- Davor Radmanović (born 1957), Croatian footballer and manager
- Nebojša Radmanović (born 1949), Bosnia and Herzegovina politician
- Staniša Radmanović (born 1940), Yugoslav sprint canoeist
- Vladimir Radmanović (born 1980), Serbian basketball player
