= Readman =

Surname

Readman is a surname. Notable people with the surname include:

- Angela Readman (born 1973), English poet
- David Readman (born 1970), English singer
- Paul Readman, Irish political and cultural historian
- Sylvie Readman (born 1958), Canadian photographer
- Yomiko Readman, the protagonist in the Japanese novel series Read or Die

== See also ==
- Reedman
