= Redmond =

Redmond may refer to:

- Redmond (name)
- Redmond Linux, a computer operating system from the former Lycoris (company)

== Places ==
=== United States ===
- Redmond, Oregon
- Redmond, Utah
- Redmond, Washington
- John Redmond Reservoir, Kansas, USA

=== Elsewhere ===
- Ballyredmond (Redmond's Town), a townland in County Carlow, Ireland
- Redmond, Western Australia, a townsite and locality in the City of Albany
- Redmond West, Western Australia, a locality in the City of Albany

== Companies ==
- Microsoft Corporation, sometimes identified by the metonym "Redmond" because it is headquartered in Redmond, Washington

== See also ==
- Redmon (disambiguation)
