= Redmann =

Redmann is a surname, and may refer to:

- Bernd Redmann (born 1965), German composer and musicologist
- Jan Redmann (born 1979), German politician (CDU)
- Jean M. Redmann (born 1955), American novelist
- Kirk Redmann (born 1961), American operatic tenor
- Teal Redmann (born 1982), American actress

== See also ==
- Redman (surname)
