= Redman, Scott County, Missouri =

Extinct hamlet in Missouri, U.S.

Coordinates: 37°06′19″N 89°30′31″W

Redman is an extinct town in Scott County, in the U.S. state of Missouri.

Redman was founded in the 1910s, taking its name from Robert Redman, an early settler.
