= Redmen =

Redmen or red men may refer to:

- Redmen a term used for individuals wearing the color red to support a team.
- Improved Order of Red Men, American fraternal organization established in 1834

== Sports ==
- St. John's Redmen, athletic teams of St. John's University in New York City (now known as St. John's Red Storm)
- McGill Redmen, athletic teams of McGill University in Montreal, Quebec (now known as McGill Redbirds)
- UMass Redmen, athletic teams of University of Massachusetts Amherst (now known as UMass Minutemen and Minutewomen)
- Brooklin Redmen, box lacrosse team in Whitby, Ontario (now known as Brooklin Lacrosse Club)
- Bedford Road Collegiate Redmen, athletic teams of a public high school in Saskatoon, Saskatchewan (now known as Bedford Road Collegiate Redhawks)
- West Toronto Redmen, defunct junior ice hockey team in Toronto (last known as West Toronto Nationals)
- East Islip Redmen Football team in East Islip, Long Island New York

== See also ==
- Redmond (disambiguation)
- Redman (disambiguation)
