= Redman (surname) =

== Musicians ==
- Dewey Redman (1931–2006), American jazz tenor saxophonist
- Don Redman (1900–1964), American jazz musician and composer
- Joshua Redman (born 1969), prominent American jazz saxophonist
- Matt Redman (born 1974), English Christian worship leader and songwriter
- Michael Redman (singer) (born 1945), American singer
- Mike Redman (born 1978), Dutch musician, record producer, film maker and label owner
- Reginald Redman (1892–1972), British light music composer
- Ryan Redman, member of Exit Ten, a British metal band

== Athletes ==
- Billy Redman (1928–1994), English footballer
- Brian Redman (born 1937), English racing driver
- Chris Redman (born 1977), American football quarterback
- Diana Redman (born 1984), Israeli footballer
- Doc Redman (born 1997), American professional golfer
- Isaac Redman (born 1984), former American football running back
- Jim Redman (cricketer) (1926–1981), English cricketer
- Jim Redman (born 1931), English motorcycle road racer
- Joel Redman (born 1987), English professional wrestler
- Magdalen Redman (1930–2020), American professional baseball player
- Mark Redman (born 1974), American professional baseball player
- Mark Redman (American football) (born 2002), American professional football player
- Michele Redman (born 1965), American professional golfer
- Prentice Redman (born 1979), American professional baseball outfielder
- Rick Redman (1943–2022), American football linebacker
- Tike Redman (born 1977), American professional baseball center fielder

== Film and television ==
- Amanda Redman (born 1957), English actress
- Dean Redman, British born Canadian actor
- Erich Redman (1964–2025), Russian-born German actor
- Frank Redman (1901–1966), American cinematographer
- Joyce Redman (1915–2012), Anglo-Irish actress
- Layne Redman, British television presenter, writer and actor
- Mark Redman, fictional character in British TV series Coronation Street
- Stuart Redman, played by Gary Sinise, fictional character in television mini-series The Stand (adapted from Stephen King's novel with the same name)
- Justin Redman, played by Justin Long, fictional character in the movie Dodgeball : A True Underdog Story

== Other ==
- Jason Redman, former U.S. Navy SEAL
- John Redman (Trinity College) (1499–1551), first Master of Trinity College, Cambridge
- John Redman (physician) (1722–1808), first president of the College of Physicians of Philadelphia
- Joseph Redman (1891–1968), admiral in the United States Navy
- Karen Redman (born 1953), Canadian politician
- Lawrence V. Redman (1880–1946), Canadian chemist
- Leanne Redman, Australian-born American physiologist and expert on obesity
- Lenn Redman (1912–1987), American cartoonist and animator
- Michael Redman (politician) (born 1966), New Zealand businessman and politician
- Monte N. Redman (born 1951), American company director
- Roderick Oliver Redman British astronomer
- Sally Redman, New Zealand-born Australian public health researcher
- Tim Redman, former president of the U.S. Chess Federation
- Willie Redman, American drag performer

== See also ==
- Redman (disambiguation)
- Redmann
