= Ballyhuppahane =

Townland in County Laois, Ireland

Ballyhuppahane Baile Shopacháin
- Townland
- Location in Ireland
- Coordinates: 53°05′29″N 7°27′03″W
- Country: Ireland
- Province: Leinster
- County: County Laois
- Elevation: 205 m (673 ft)

Population (2001)
  - Urban: 54
  - Rural: 91
- Time zone: UTC+0 (WET)
  - Summer (DST): UTC-1 (IST (WEST))
- Irish Grid Reference: N3770105561

Ballyhuppahane, also spelt Ballyhuppahaun, (Irish: Baile Shopacháin) is a townland in County Laois, Ireland.

== Features ==
Ballyhuppahane is situated in the Slieve Bloom Mountains and there are a number of walks nearby. Most of the area is covered in forest. The trees were planted by local farmers on marginal land unsuitable for farming. The neighbourhood of Ballyhuppahane has some recreational areas such as the Cathole Falls.

== See also ==
- List of towns and villages in Ireland
