= Cloughgrenan =

Cloughgrenan (also spelled Cloughgrennan, Clogrenan and Clogrennan) is a historic geographic location in Ireland which gives its name to two townlands in county County Laois and one in County Carlow, spanning a total area of 2,354 acres (9.53 km^{2}).

Cloughgrenan may refer to:

- Clogrenan Formation - a geological formation
- Clogrenan ED - an electoral division in County Carlow
- Clogrennan Hill- a 336 m (1,102 ft) hill in County Laois
- Clogrennan House, a ruined historic big house in County Carlow
- Baronet of Cloughgrenan - a peerage title

== People ==
- Baron Butler of Cloughgrenan or Earl of Arran, a title in both the Peerage of Scotland and the Peerage of Ireland
- Sir Edmund Butler of Cloughgrenan (1534–1602), second son of James Butler, 9th Earl of Ormond and Lady Joan Fitzgerald
- Sir Thomas Butler, 1st Baronet of Cloughgrenan (died 1642), Irish nobleman, illegitimate son of Sir Edmund Butler of Cloughgrenan
- Sir Thomas Butler, 3rd Baronet of Cloughgrenan (died 1704), Irish baronet and politician
- Sir Pierce Butler, 4th Baronet of Cloughgrenan (1670–1732), Irish politician and baronet
- Sir Richard Butler, 5th Baronet of Cloughgrenan (1699–1771), Irish politician and baronet
- Sir Thomas Butler, 6th Baronet of Cloughgrenan (1735–1772), Irish politician and baronet
- Sir Richard Butler, 7th Baronet of Cloughgrenan (1761–1817), Anglo-Irish politician
