= Brophy =

Surname of Irish origin

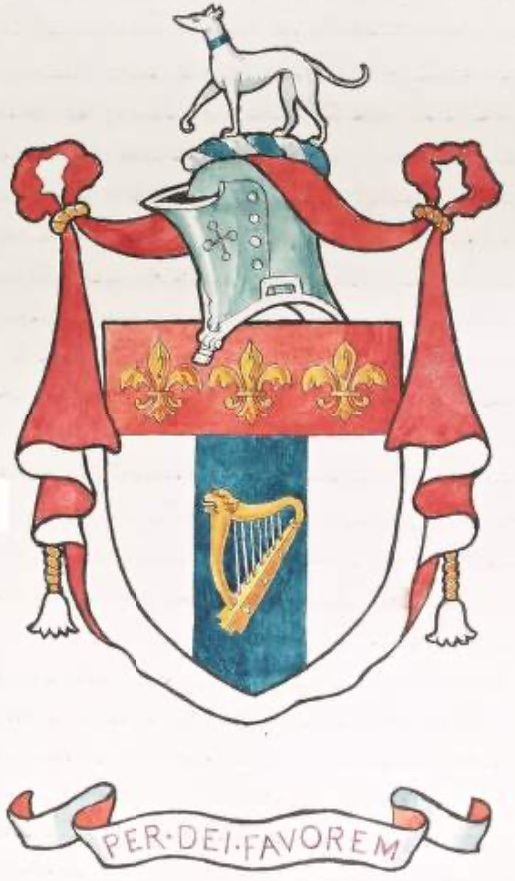
- Argent, a pale vert of an antique harp or stringed argent, a chief gules charged with thee fleur-de-lis
- Language: English / Irish

Origin
- Language: Irish
- Derivation: (Uí Bhróithe)
- Region of origin: Ireland

Brophy is an Irish surname of ancient origin, which is derived from the Irish "Uí Bhróithe" or "Ó Bróithe" septs that were located mostly around Ballybrophy, Laois, and in counties Carlow and Kilkenny. It is among Europe’s earliest true hereditary surnames, traceable to a 9th-century Ossorian ancestor and still geographically rooted in the same region more than a millennium later.

The Brophy family has played a prominent role in Irish history for over a thousand years, producing petty kings (Rí), clerics, soldiers, and writers. The name is first attested in the late 11th century, yet, as members of the Dál Birn dynasty, the family’s semi-legendary genealogy is said to reach back to around AD 200, according to Bodleian Library, MS Rawlinson B 502.

As such, it remains one of Ireland's oldest extant pre-Norman Conquest noble families, being related to the kings of Osraige and the Fitzpatrick dynasty as represented by the Earl of Upper Ossory, Baron Upper Ossory, and Baron Castletown.

The ancestral seat of the family chief became Ballybrophy (historically Ballybrohy, from Irish: Baile Uí Bhróithe, meaning 'townland of Ó Bróithe') after the Norman Invasion of Ireland in the 12th century.

Giolla na Naomh Ó hUidhrín wrote in the 14th century that the earliest ancestor of the Brophys was Sedna, the great-grandson of the semi-legendary pre-Christian founder of the Kingdom of Ossory, Óengus Osrithe.

In The Book of Rights, the Osraige are labelled as Síl mBresail Bric ("the seed of Bresail Bric") after Bressail Bricc, a remote ancestor of the Ossorians. Bressail Bricc had two sons; Lughaidh, ancestor of the Laigan, and Connla, from whom the Ossorians sprang, through Óengus Osrithe. Thus, the people of Osraige were also sometimes collectively referred to as Clann Connla.

"A fine district of beauteous nuts;
O'Broithe over free Magh Sedna."

— Ó hUidhrín, Triallam timcheall na Fodla ("Let us wander around Ireland") (1420).

"The Annals of the Four Masters" records the death of Gilla Molua O'Brophy (Ua Bruaidheada) of Rath Tamnaighe (Lisdowney, Kilkenny) in 1069. The "Annals of Ulster" mentions that Connor O'Brophy (Conchobar Ua Broighthe), King of Ceann Chaille, and Domhnall Mac Gilla Patraic, King of Upper Ossory, were slain by the O'Moores in 1165. Giolla na Naomh Ó hUidhrín mentions the O'Brophys as residing in Magh Sedna (the Plain of Sedna) in the barony of Galmoy (barony), Kilkenny in his 14th century work, "Tuilleadh feasa ar Éirinn óigh." The name of Galmoy (barony), in Irish Gabhalmhaigh, means "plain of the Branch, or Ghabhal" (River Goul). Magh Sedna Was also known as Aos-Chinn-chaille, i.e., [the territory of] the people of Cean Chaille.

Magh Sedna is a fertile part of Ireland which the Danes invaded in the ninth century, and where the Normans came after they had conquered Britain in the eleventh century. Over the years the Norse, Norman and Gaelic bloods have mingled in the families of later centuries. It is the paradoxical story of Ireland that the conquered frequently absorbed their conquerors through intermarriage, language and customs. Hence the oppressors of one generation often produced the rebels of a later one.

William O'Brothe was appointed Prior of the Augustinian Monastery of St. Tigernacius of Aghamacart by Pope Sixtus IV on 31 March 1481. William is likely to have been the illegitimate son of Philip O'Brothe, Abbot of Kilcooley Abbey, whom Pope Pius II legitimised and instructed to be taken on as a monk at the Abby after his father's death.

When Florence Fitzpatrick, 3rd Baron Upper Ossory, the son of the last person to have claim to the kingship of Osraige, was pardoned by Queen Elizabeth I in 1601, his kinsmen, the Brophys and other "old tribesman of Upper Ossory," were also mentioned in the pardon. Ui Broithe was anglicised as O'Broghie in the Patent Rolls of James I in 1603 and 1607. The name appears as Brohy in census of 1659.

Their territory comprised the level portion of the barony of Galmoy, in the county of Kilkenny. They were driven from the plain of Magh Sedna into Upper Ossory, after the Norman invasion of Ireland, and their chief settled at Ballybrophy, near Borris-in-Ossory, in Queen's County (now County Laois).

At Christmas 1626 Charles I granted his favourite, George Villiers, Duke of Buckingham, Borris-in-Ossory, "Ballybrophy, Grangemore, &c., &c.; all of which he erected into a manor to be called the Manor of Villiers".

== Arms (Heraldry) ==
The Brophy coat of arms is blazoned as Argent (silver), with a vert (green) antique harp and chief gules (red) charged with thee fleur-de-lis. When granting the arms, the Ulster King of Arms selected imagery from the ancient family's pedigree, combining the coat of arms of province of Leinster with the heraldic blazon of the Fitzpatrick dynasty borne by the Earl of Upper Ossory, Baron Upper Ossory, and Baron Castletown.

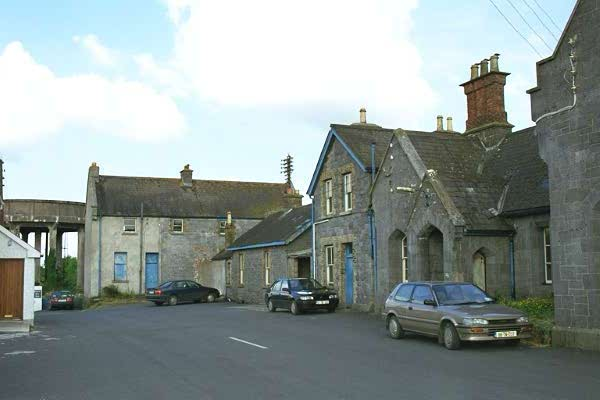
Train Depot in Ballybrophy, Laois

== Notable individuals with the Brophy surname ==
Notable individuals with the surname include:

- Alfred Brophy, American academic
- Bernie Brophy (1903–1982), Canadian ice hockey player
- Brigid Brophy, Lady Levey (1929–1995), English writer, philosopher and critic
- Drew Brophy, American surfboard artist
- David Brophy (boxer) (born 1990), Scottish boxer
- David Brophy (conductor) (born 1972), Irish conductor
- David Brophy (historian), Australian historian
- Eamonn Brophy, Scottish footballer
- Edward Brophy (1895–1960), American character actor
- Frank Brophy (1900–1930), Canadian ice hockey player
- Fred Brophy, Australian tent boxing promoter
- Gerard Brophy, South African and British cricketer
- Greg Brophy, American politician
- Harry Brophy (born c. 1916), English football player and coach
- Hugh Brophy, Irish football player
- James Brophy (disambiguation), several people
- Jane Brophy (born 1963), British politician
- Jay Brophy, American football player
- Jed Brophy, New Zealand actor
- John Brophy (disambiguation), several people
- Kevin Brophy, American actor
- Niall Brophy (born 1935), Irish and British Lions rugby player
- Paul Brophy (1937–1986), American firefighter
- Philip Brophy, Australian artist
- Sally Brophy (1928–2007), American actress
- Therese Brophy (born 1976), Irish camogie player

== See also ==
- Brophy College Preparatory
- Ballybrophy
- Dál Birn
- Brophy, a fictional character in the 1977 comedy film High Anxiety
- Brophy, a fictional character (minor as police sergeant) in 1944 comedy film with Cary Grant Arsenic and Old Lace
