= Clandonagh =

Barony in County Laois, Ireland

Clandonagh Clann Donnchadha (Irish)
- Barony
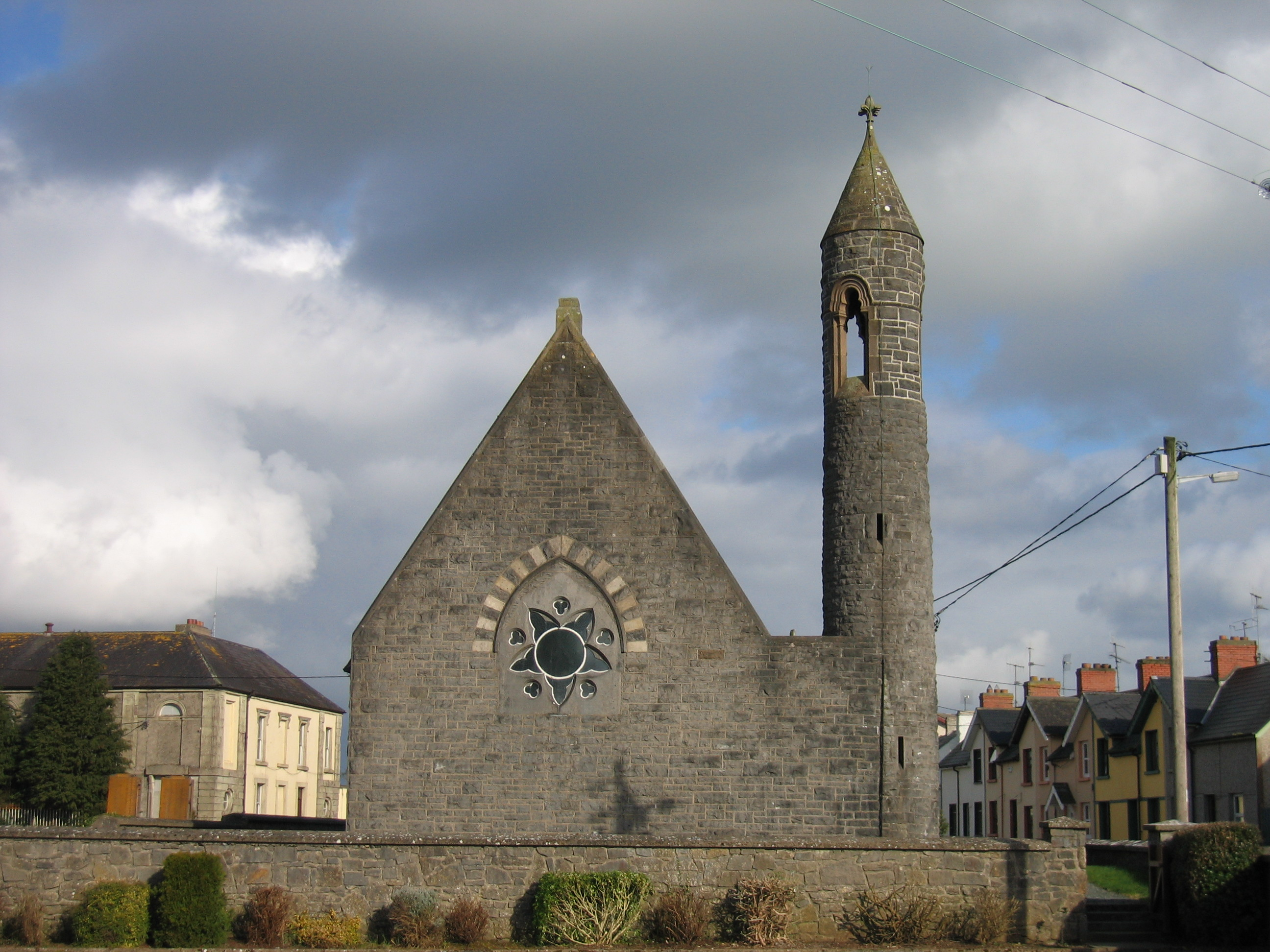
- Round tower and church in Borris-in-Ossory

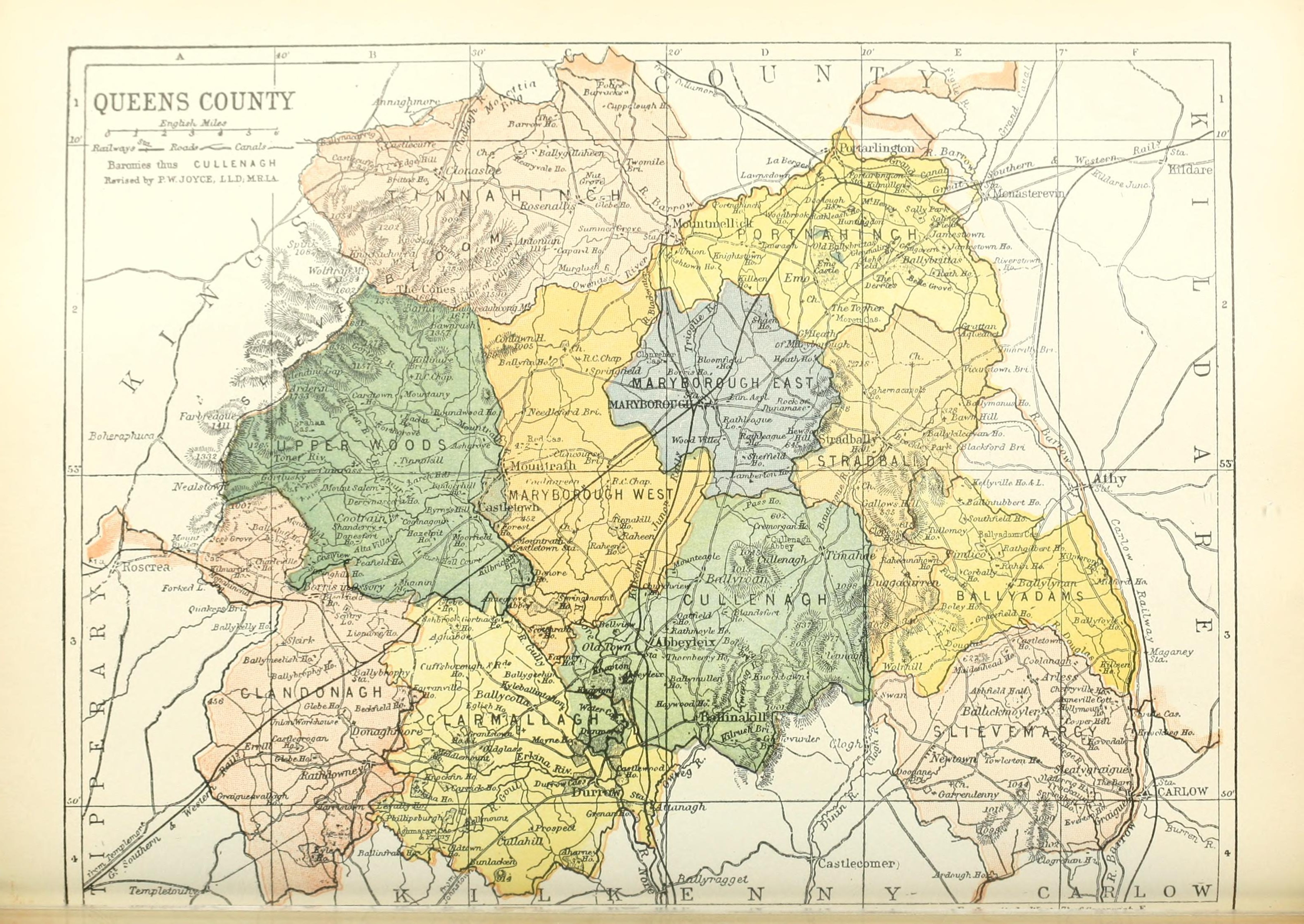
- Barony map of Queen's County, 1900; Clandonagh is peach-coloured and in the southwest.
- Sovereign state: Republic of Ireland
- Province: Leinster
- County: Laois

Area
  - Total: 176.98 km^{2} (68.33 sq mi)

Clandonagh (Irish: Clann Donncha) is a barony in County Laois (formerly called Queen's County or County Leix), Republic of Ireland. A barony was a historical subdivision of a county; mainly cadastral rather than administrative.

== Etymology ==
Clandonagh barony is named after the Ó Donnchadha (Dunphy) clan who ruled the area during the Middle Ages.

== Geography ==
Clandonagh is in the southwest corner of Laois; it is bordered by Upper Woods to the north, Clarmallagh to the east, County Kilkenny to the south and County Tipperary to the west. The Erkina River flows through it, and the Slieve Bloom Mountains are in its north.

== History ==
Clandonagh was one of three traditional subunits of Upper Ossory, which was extant as a barony by 1657 and formally abolished in 1846, and divided into Clandonagh, Upper Woods and Clarmallagh. The name refers to the "Clan Dunphy", referring to the Ó Donnchadha, who claimed descent from Donnchad Midi (AD 733–797). They were related to the Fitzpatricks.

Clan Moroghoe migrated from Clandonagh to their seat in County Cork in 1709.

It is referred to in the topographical poem Tuilleadh feasa ar Éirinn óigh (Giolla na Naomh Ó hUidhrín, d. 1420):

O'Cearḃaill dar corcraḋ croinn,
O'Donnchaḋa dreaċ dioghoinn,
Sloiġ liag as don tár toraid,
Dá riġ iad a haonchonair.

("O'Cearbhaill for whom trees are ruddy, O'Donnchadha of honest aspect, Whose rocklike hosts possess the fruitful land, Are two kings of the same territory.") This refers to Ely O'Carroll, located to the immediate west of Clandonagh.

== List of settlements ==
Below is a list of settlements in Clandonagh barony:

- Aghaboe
- Ballybrophy
- Borris-in-Ossory
- Donaghmore
- Errill
- Rathdowney
