= Whipping boy =

Historical profession

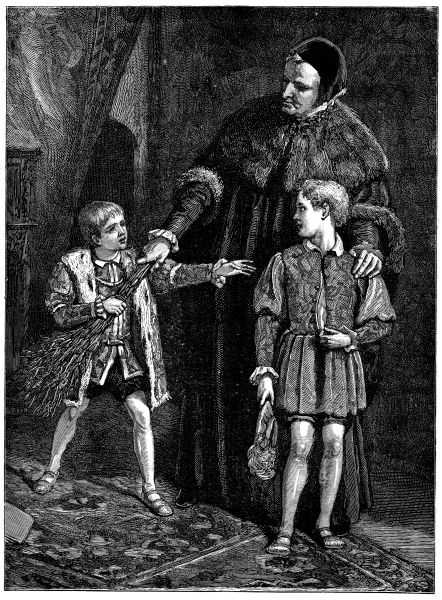
"Edward VI and his Whipping Boy" by Walter Sydney Stacey from his 1882 oil painting.

A whipping boy was a boy educated alongside a prince (or boy monarch) in early modern Europe who supposedly received corporal punishment for the prince's transgressions in his presence. The prince was not punished himself because his royal status exceeded that of his tutor; seeing a friend punished would provide an equivalent motivation not to repeat the offence. An archaic proverb which captures a similar idea is "to beat a dog before a lion". Whipping was a common punishment administered by tutors at that time. There is little contemporary evidence for the existence of whipping boys, and evidence that some princes were indeed whipped by their tutors, although Nicholas Orme suggests that nobles might have been beaten less often than other pupils. Some historians regard whipping boys as entirely mythical; others suggest they applied only in the case of a boy king, protected by divine right, and not to mere princes.

In Renaissance humanism, Erasmus's treatises "The Education of a Christian Prince" (1516) and "Declamatio de pueris statim ac liberaliter instituendis" (1530) mention the inappropriateness of physical chastisement of princes, but do not mention proxy punishment. Hartley Coleridge wrote in 1852, "to be flogged by proxy was the exclusive privilege of royal blood. ... It was much coveted for the children of the poorer gentry, as the first step in the ladder of preferment." John Gough Nichols wrote in 1857, "the whole matter is somewhat legendary, and though certain vicarious or rather minatory punishments may have been occasionally adopted, it does not seem likely that any one individual among the King's schoolfellows should have been uniformly selected, whether he were in fault or not, as the victim or scape-goat of the royal misdemeanours".

In current English, a "whipping boy" is a metaphor which may have a similar meaning to scapegoat, fall guy, or sacrificial lamb; alternatively it may mean a perennial loser, a victim of group bullying or someone who is unfairly blamed for the actions of others.

== Putative historical examples ==
Young royals alleged to have had whipping boys include:

- Conrad, King of Jerusalem and later of Italy (1228–1254) had twelve companions beaten in his stead by his tutors, according to the Cento Novelle Antiche (c.1300), so that "King Conrad took great heed not to act wrongly, for pity of them". Alessandro d'Ancona sees an antecedent of the Conrad novella in Phaedrus' fable "The Bullock and the Old Ox".
- Henry FitzRoy, 1st Duke of Richmond and Somerset (1519–1536), whose tutor Richard Croke complained in 1527 that Richmond's usher, George Cotton, was undermining Croke's authority; among the charges were withdrawing "those boys whose punishment it was necessary to deter his princely pupil from the repetition of his faults", and claiming it was unseemly for Croke to whip them in Richmond's presence.
- Edward VI of England (1537–1553) to whose court Barnaby Fitzpatrick, later 2nd Baron Upper Ossory (c.1535–1581) was sent as a hostage by his father the 1st baron. Thomas Fuller's Church-History of Britain (1655) calls Fitzpatrick Edward's "proxy for correction". John Guy calls this a myth, since their tutor Richard Cox wrote of beating Edward with his staff. Konrad Heresbach in De Educandis Erudiendisque Principum Liberis (1592) recounted that he was told in London in 1547 that, when the young king uttered profanities learnt from an (unnamed) playmate, the friend was whipped in his presence and Edward warned that he deserved similar punishment.
- The future Frederick IV of Liegnitz (1552–1596), for whom Hans von Schweinichen (1552–1616) was described in 1856 as the "Prügeljunge" by Gustav Freytag, popularising the concept in Germany. Freytag's claim is not supported by other accounts of Schweinichen.
- The future Charles I of England (1600–1649), to whom William Murray, later 1st Earl of Dysart (c.1600–1655) was "page and whipping–boy" according to Gilbert Burnet's History of my own time (1723). William's uncle Thomas Murray tutored both boys. As king, Charles appointed William Groom of the Bedchamber.
- The young Louis XV of France (1710–1774) was supplied by his governess Madame de Ventadour with playmates of his own age, including a Versailles cobbler's son nicknamed le hussard ("the hussar") from a costume he wore. Marie, marquise du Deffand wrote in 1769 that this boy would be punished in the king's stead, whence the victim of any bully was colloquially called their hussard. Jacques-Antoine Dulaure in 1825 called the method "strange", "rather barbarous", and "iniquitous", and said Louis continued to neglect his studies regardless.
- According to the 1898 memoirs of François Certain de Canrobert, who served in the French Army in 1842 in Algeria under the Spanish-born Antoine de La Torré (1787–1851), it was rumoured that de La Torré was an illegitimate son of Manuel Godoy and that his irascibility was because as a boy he had received "either slaps or the whip" as proxy for the sons of Carlos IV.
- Chinese imperial princes of the Qing Dynasty (1644–1912) had banner attendants denoted by the Manchu term haha juse (Chinese transcription 哈哈珠子); at first this meant youths educated alongside the prince, and later his special "reading partner" and bodyguard. These were influential in the Kangxi reign (1661–1722) but subsequently lost status. In 1876, the North-China Herald commented on the announcement in the Peking Gazette of the start of the education of the five-year-old Guangxu Emperor: "The next appointment to be made (though not gazetted) will probably be that of the child who, according to the Manchu Imperial custom, shares his Majesty's studies under the name of 'ha'hachutsze, in the capacity of a souffre-douleur or "whipping-boy." Whenever the Son of Heaven is naughty or inattentive, the 'ha'hachutsze is beaten or disgraced".

An adult example often included in discussions of whipping boys is provided by the French Catholic prelates Arnaud d'Ossat (1537–1604) and Jacques Davy Duperron (1556–1618), who were symbolically whipped by Pope Clement VIII in 1593 in proxy expiation on behalf of Henry IV of France (1553–1610), who had renounced Protestantism.

== In later literature ==
Samuel Rowley's 1604 play When You See Me You Know Me depicts the childhood of the future Edward VI. When he skips class to play tennis, Edward "Ned" Browne is sent to the chapel to be whipped by the master of children. Cranmer says, "Since he was whipped thus for the prince's faults. / His grace hath got more knowledge in a month. / Than he attained in a year before, / For still the fearful boy, to save his breech, / Doth hourly haunt him, wheresoe'er he goes." The prince persuades king Henry VIII to knight Ned: "the poor gentleman was pitifully wounded in the back parts, as may appear by the scar, if his knightship would but untruss there". Ned hopes the tutors will refrain from whipping a knight, to which the fool retorts, "If they do, he shall make thee a lord, and then they dare not." This work may have helped the idea of a whipping boy to take root.

John Donne alluded to proxy whipping in a sermon he preached in 1628: "Sometimes, when the children of great persons offend at school, another person is whipped for them, and that affects them, and works upon a good nature; but if that person should take physic for them in a sickness, it would do them no good: God's corrections upon others may work by way of example upon thee; but because thou art sick for physic, take it thyself." The earliest attestation of the word "whipping boy" in the Oxford English Dictionary is from a 1647 Bible commentary by John Trapp on 1 Tim 5:20: "Those Presbyters that sin publikely ... and those who were convicted by two or three witnesses ...: Rebuke before all, yet not as if they were whipping boyes".

In Book V of Gil Blas (1715) by Alain-René Lesage, when the Marquis of Leganez forbids his son's tutors from beating him, Don Raphael is flogged in his stead: "a most ingenious device, by which to keep this troublesome young lordling in awe, without trenching on his foolish father's injunctions". The Fortunes of Nigel (1822) by Walter Scott describes Malagrowther, the fictional whipping boy of the young James VI of Scotland (later also James I of England): "Under the stern rule, indeed, of George Buchanan, who did not approve of the vicarious mode of punishment, James bore the penance of his own faults, and Mungo Malagrowther enjoyed a sinecure; but James's other pedagogue, Master Patrick Young, went more ceremoniously to work, and appalled the very soul of the youthful King by the floggings which he bestowed on the whipping-boy, when the royal task was not suitably performed." In Mark Twain's 1881 novel, The Prince and the Pauper, the pauper's masquerade as Edward VI is aided by information from the prince's whipping boy, son and namesake of the late Sir Humphrey Marlow, a "Head Lieutenant" in Henry VIII's Household. Twain wrote, "James I. and Charles II. had whipping-boys, when they were little fellows, to take their punishment for them when they fell short in their lessons; so I have ventured to furnish my small prince with one, for my own purposes."

The Whipping Boy by Sid Fleischman, which won the 1987 Newbery Medal for children's books, tells of the brattish Prince Horace who learns humility on an adventure with his whipping boy, a rat-catcher named Jemmy. In George R. R. Martin's fantasy series A Song of Ice and Fire, published from 1991, the characters Tommen Baratheon and Joffrey Baratheon have a whipping boy named Pate. In David Belbin's 2002 children's novel Boy King, Barnaby FitzPatrick is whipped by John Cheke for teaching Edward VI swear-words; when Edward protests that nobody has whipping boys any more, Cheke says "the Duke of Richmond had one". Cheke relents from giving FitzPatrick the whipping owed to Edward. Sarah Ruhl's 2016 play "Scenes from Court Life, or The Whipping Boy and His Prince" includes whipping boys in its depictions of Charles I and Charles II of England.

== Modern slavery ==
Some accounts of modern slavery include instances of slaves punished for the offences of a master's child. In 19th-century southern China, among slave boys as study companions to candidates for the imperial examinations, one example was noted by James L. Watson. In Alex Tizon's 2017 nonfiction essay "My Family's Slave", the author's mother recounts a 1940s incident in which, caught in a lie, she made Lola, the titular servant, receive the punishment of 12 lashes of her father's belt. Biram Dah Abeid has alleged that slaves in Mauritania are used as souffre douleurs or whipping boys.

== See also ==
- Fall guy
- Scapegoat
