= Mac Giolla Phádraig dynasty =

Descendants of the former kings of Osraige

Mac Giolla Phádraig / Fitzpatrick
- Parent house: Dál Birn
- Country: Ireland
- Founded: late 10th century
- Founder: Gilla Pátraic mac Donnchada, heir of Óengus Osrithe through Cerball mac Dúnlainge's son Cellach
- Current head: Vacant
- Final ruler: Bernard FitzPatrick, 2nd Baron Castletown
- Titles: Kings of Osraige; Kings of Leinster; Princes of Gowran; Lords of Slieve Bloom; Kingdom of Ireland titles: Baron Upper Ossory; Earl of Upper Ossory; Baron Gowran; Baron Castletown
- Dissolution: 29 May 1937

Mac Giolla Phádraig (Irish: [mˠək ɟɪl̪ˠə fˠaːd̪ˠɾˠəɟ]; Old Irish: Mac Gilla Pátraic) is a native Irish dynastic surname which translates into English as "Son of the Devotee of (St.) Patrick". In the medieval period, the Mac Giolla Phádraigs were hereditary kings of Osraige; today, the anglicised version of the name is commonly "Fitzpatrick".

== Name ==
The ancient kingdom of Osraige is the patrimony of the Mac Giolla Phádraig dynasty.

The name "Giolla Phádraig" first appears in the annals at the end of the tenth century in connection with the Christianized Uí Ímair dynasty of Waterford, and is later found elsewhere. Likely as a consequence of the intermarriage, this surname came to be borne by the leading medieval branch of the Dál Birn lineage, the illustrious ruling dynasty of the neighbouring Osraige. This surname was adopted by the descendants of king Gilla Patráic mac Donnchada, who reigned as king of Osraige from 976 to 996. Some scholars speculate a Norse influence on the name. In 1537, as part of the surrender /submission of Brian Mac Giolla Phádraig (then the ruling chief of Upper Ossory and a lineal descendant of Gilla Pátraic mac Donnchada) to King Henry VIII, Brian took the anglicised name of Fitz-Patrick - Fitz is a Norman French name meaning son - and the majority of the Mac Giolla Phádraig clan followed suit. Many members of the lineage feature prominently in Irish and English politics throughout history.

== Notable members ==
- Gilla Patráic mac Donnchada, namesake and progenitor of the clan Mac Giolla Phádraig; king of Osraige from 976 to 996.
- Donnchad mac Gilla Pátraic, son of Gilla Pátraic mac Donnchada; king of Osraige from 1003 to 1039. (Also king of Leinster from 1033 to 1039.) First king to bear the surname Mac Giolla Phádraig.
- Brian Mac Giolla Phádraig, Irish poet (c. 1580 – c. 1652); not to be confused with the 1st through 8th Barons Upper Ossory (See below.)
- Brian Mac Giolla Phádraig, 1st Baron Upper Ossory (1485–1575).
- Barnaby Fitzpatrick, 2nd Baron Upper Ossory (c. 1535–1581)
- Florence Fitzpatrick, 3rd Baron Upper Ossory (died 1613)
- Thady or Teige Fitzpatrick, 4th Baron Upper Ossory (died 1627)
- Barnaby Fitzpatrick, 5th Baron Upper Ossory (died c. 1638)
- Barnaby Fitzpatrick, 6th Baron Upper Ossory (died c. 1666)
- Barnaby Fitzpatrick, 7th Baron Upper Ossory (died 1696). On 11 May 1691, the seventh baron was attainted and the barony forfeited.
- Richard FitzPatrick, 1st Baron Gowran (died 9 June 1727) was a British naval captain.
- John FitzPatrick, 1st Earl of Upper Ossory (1719–1758)
- John FitzPatrick, Lord Gowran, later 2nd Earl of Upper Ossory (1745–1818)
- The Hon. Richard FitzPatrick (24 January 1748 – 25 April 1813)
- John FitzPatrick, 1st Baron Castletown PC (23 September 1811 – 22 January 1883), known as John Wilson until 1842, was an Irish Liberal politician.
- Bernard FitzPatrick, 2nd Baron Castletown KP CMG PC (I) (29 July 1849 – 29 May 1937) was a soldier in the British army, a Conservative Member of Parliament.

== Historic Sites ==
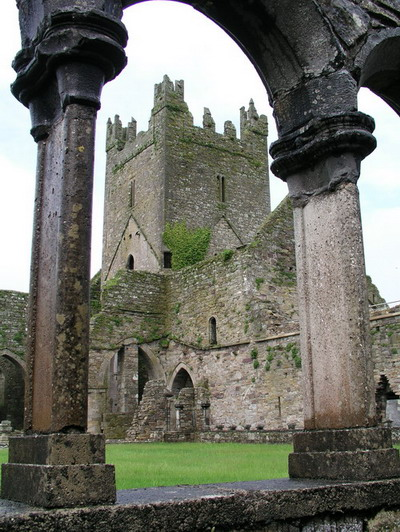
Jerpoint Abbey was founded by Domnall Mac Gilla Pátraic I (died 1176) ca. 1160.

Numerous places throughout the historic Osraige and Upper Ossory regions and elsewhere have strong associations with the activity of Clann Giolla Phádraig. These include Jerpoint Abbey in Thomastown, Co. Kilkenny; Aghamacart, Aghaboe Abbey, the vicinity of St Canice's Cathedral, Gowran, Grangefertagh near Johnstown, County Kilkenny, Ballagharahin, Co. Laois, Ballaghmore Castle, Cullahill Castle, amongst other places.

== Annals and genealogies ==
An important Ossorian genealogy for Domnall mac Donnchada mac Gilla Patric is preserved in the Bodleian Library, MS Rawlinson B 502, tracing the medieval Mac Giolla Phádraig dynasty back to Óengus Osrithe, who supposedly flourished in the first or second century. The genealogy goes on further, tracing the pedigree back to Noah (and thus presumably to Adam), but scholars regard this as an attachment of the accounts in Genesis on the back of native tradition. Another early Ossorian genealogy is found in the Book of Leinster.

== Arms, Mottoes, and Tartans ==
The white saltire on a black field is widely recognized as a standard feature in all Fitzpatrick arms, along with the lion and dragon crest. Different chiefs in the arms generally follow either three or black torteaux on a white chief, or the "French augmentation" of three fleur-de-lis or, on a chief azure - a gift from Henri II upon the 2nd Baron Upper Ossory while he served as ambassador for Edward VI. The Fitzpatrick (Mac Giolla Phádraig) Latin motto – Fortis sub Forte Fatiscet – can be interpreted as "The strong will yield to the strong." A second motto in Irish, "Ceart Láidir Abú" translates loosely to "Right and Mighty Forever", or more narrowly as "Correct, Strong, to Victory!"

== Modern Day ==
Since 2000, the Fitzpatrick-Mac Giolla Phádraig Clan Society has been researching and promoting the history of the name. Members from across the world have shared information and history, and international and regional clan gatherings have been held in Ireland and the United States for participants to present their research and visit historical sites of interest to the clan. International Clan Gatherings have been held in Portlaoise and Kilkenny city in 2000, 2002, 2004, 2007, 2010, 2013, 2018, and 2024 and regional gatherings have been held in Altamont, New York, Savannah, Georgia, and Albany, New York in since 2018 through 2025.

In April 2004, a geophysical survey using ground-penetrating radar discovered what were likely the original foundations of the twelfth century cathedral of the diocese of Ossory and another very large structure which was possibly a royal Mac Giolla Phádraig palace; noting that the site bears a strong resemblance to contemporaneous structures at the Rock of Cashel.

The Mac Giolla Phádraig Way is a hiking trail named after the family connecting communities in southwest County Laois and north County Kilkenny, as part of the Slieve Bloom Way.

== See also ==
- Fitzpatrick (surname)
- Dál Birn
- Kings of Osraige
- Kingdom of Ossory
- St. Ciarán of Saigir
- St. Patrick
- Upper Ossory
