= Cullahill =

Village in County Laois, Ireland

Cullahill An Chúlchoill
- Village
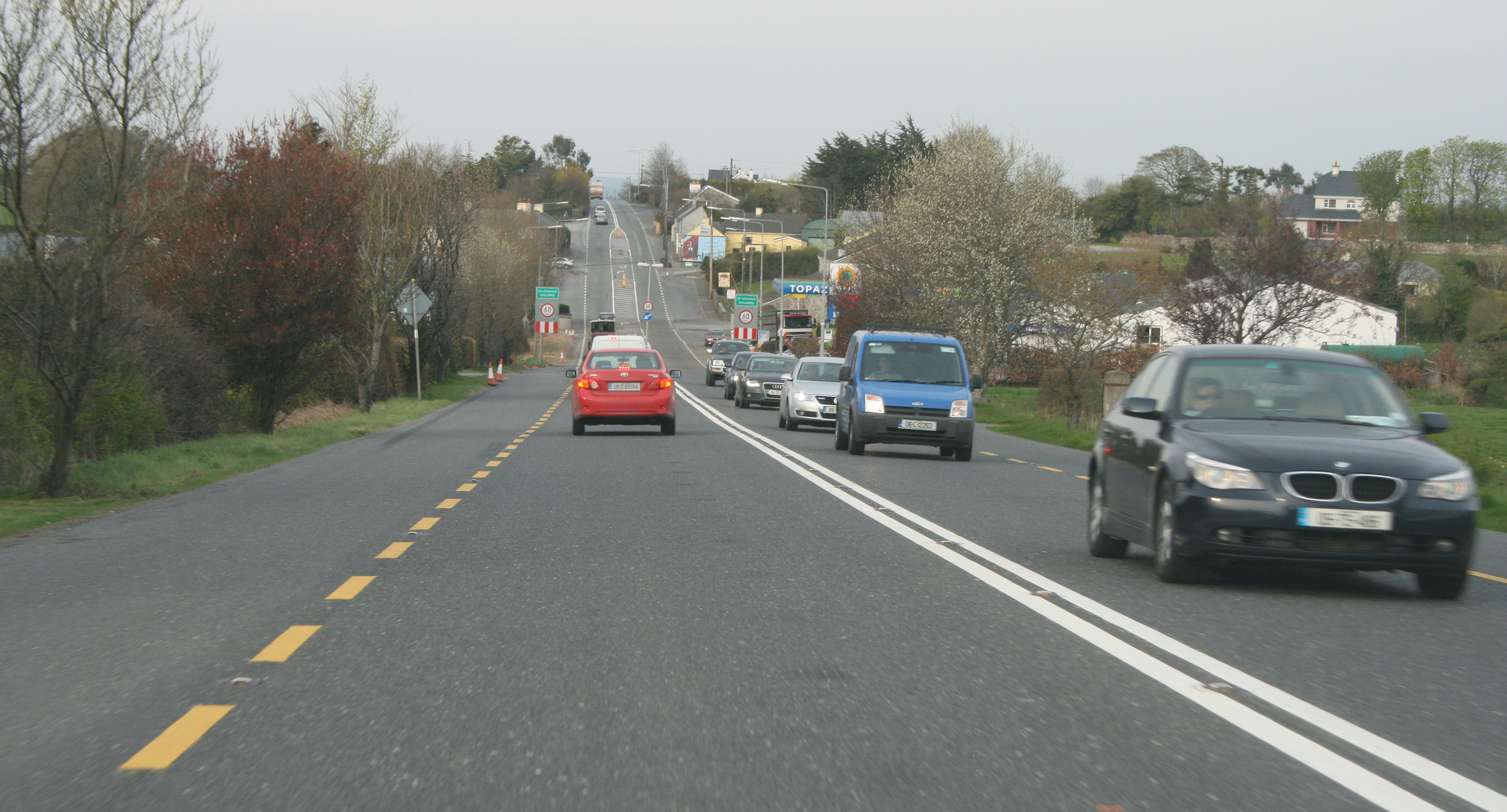
- Approaching the village on the R639

- Location in Ireland
- Coordinates: 52°49′06″N 7°28′32″W
- Country: Ireland
- Province: Leinster
- County: County Laois
- Time zone: UTC+0 (WET)
  - Summer (DST): UTC-1 (IST (WEST))
- Irish Grid Reference: S390761

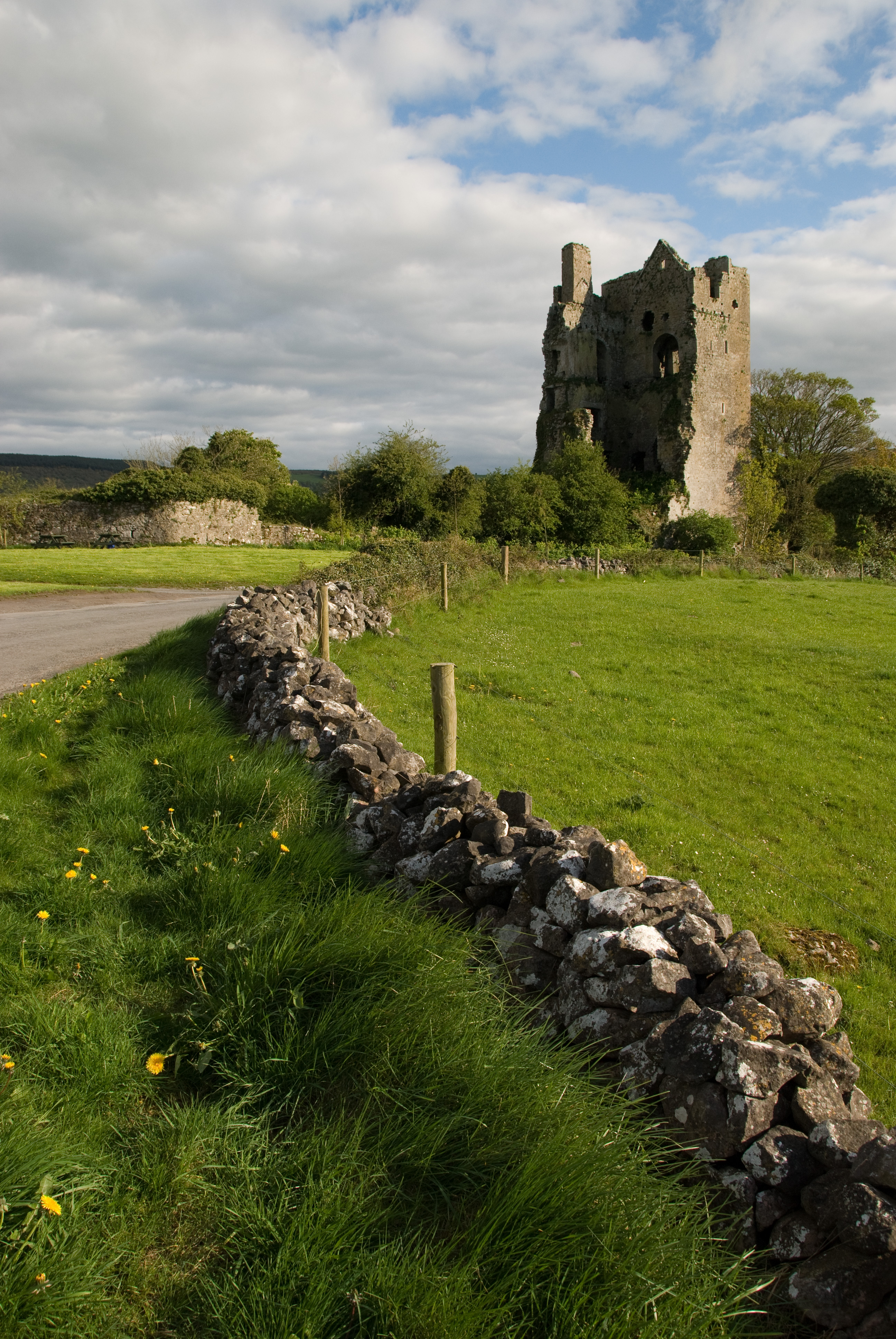
Cullahill Castle

Cullahill or Cullohill (Irish: Cúlchoill / an Chúlchoill, meaning 'the back of the woods/behind the woods') is a small village situated on the R639 road in County Laois, Ireland. Cullahill takes its name from an ancient forest that covered Cullahill Mountain and extended down to Cullahill Castle.

== History ==
A priory of Augustine canons was founded here in 550 by O'Dempsey, under the invocation of St. Tighernach who is now the patron saint of the area.

The village is home to an impressive early 15th century tower house, once the principal stronghold of the MacGillapatricks of Upper Ossory. The castle bears the image of a sheela na gig.

Under their patronage, a medical school flourished at Aghmacart townland, about a mile from the castle from before 1500 to c.1610. It was conducted by the Ó Conchubhair family. Its physicians included Donnchadh Óg Ó Conchubhair (fl. 1581-1611), Risteard Ó Conchubhair (1561–1625), Donnchadh Albanach Ó Conchubhair (1571–1647) and Cathal Ó Duinnshléibhe (fl. 1592-1611).

According to 1837 records, Cullohill was listed as a village in the parish of Aghmacart. Aghmacart is now a townland of Cullahill and contains an old church and graveyard which are still in use.

It is now part of Durrow parish and is in the Roman Catholic Diocese of Ossory.

== Activities ==
Cullohill is surrounded by countryside and has several public walkways and trekking trails in the nearby hills.

== Public transport ==
TFI Local link operated by JJ Kavanagh and Sons provides a daily journey each way from Portlaoise to Cashel 828 and Thurles 858 replacing M&A Coaches, Bus Eireann and Aircoach

== Sport ==
The local GAA club is The Harps which was formed in 1984 as an amalgamation with Durrow. Up until then Cullohill had its own hurling team and had won the Laois senior hurling championship in 1955 and 1964. The 1955 team was captained by Lar Dunphy and the 1964 team by Martin Mahony.

== Notable people ==
Darina Allen, née O'Connell, a celebrity chef, is a native of Cullohill.

== See also ==
- List of towns and villages in Ireland
