= Upper Woods =

Barony in County Laois, Ireland

Upper Woods An Choill Uachtarach (Irish)
- Barony
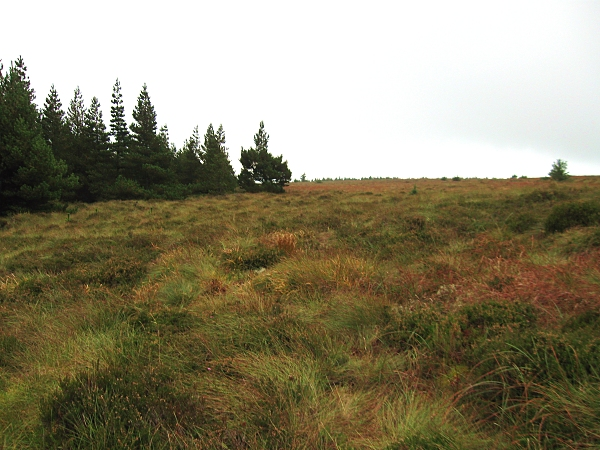
- Forests in Upperwoods barony

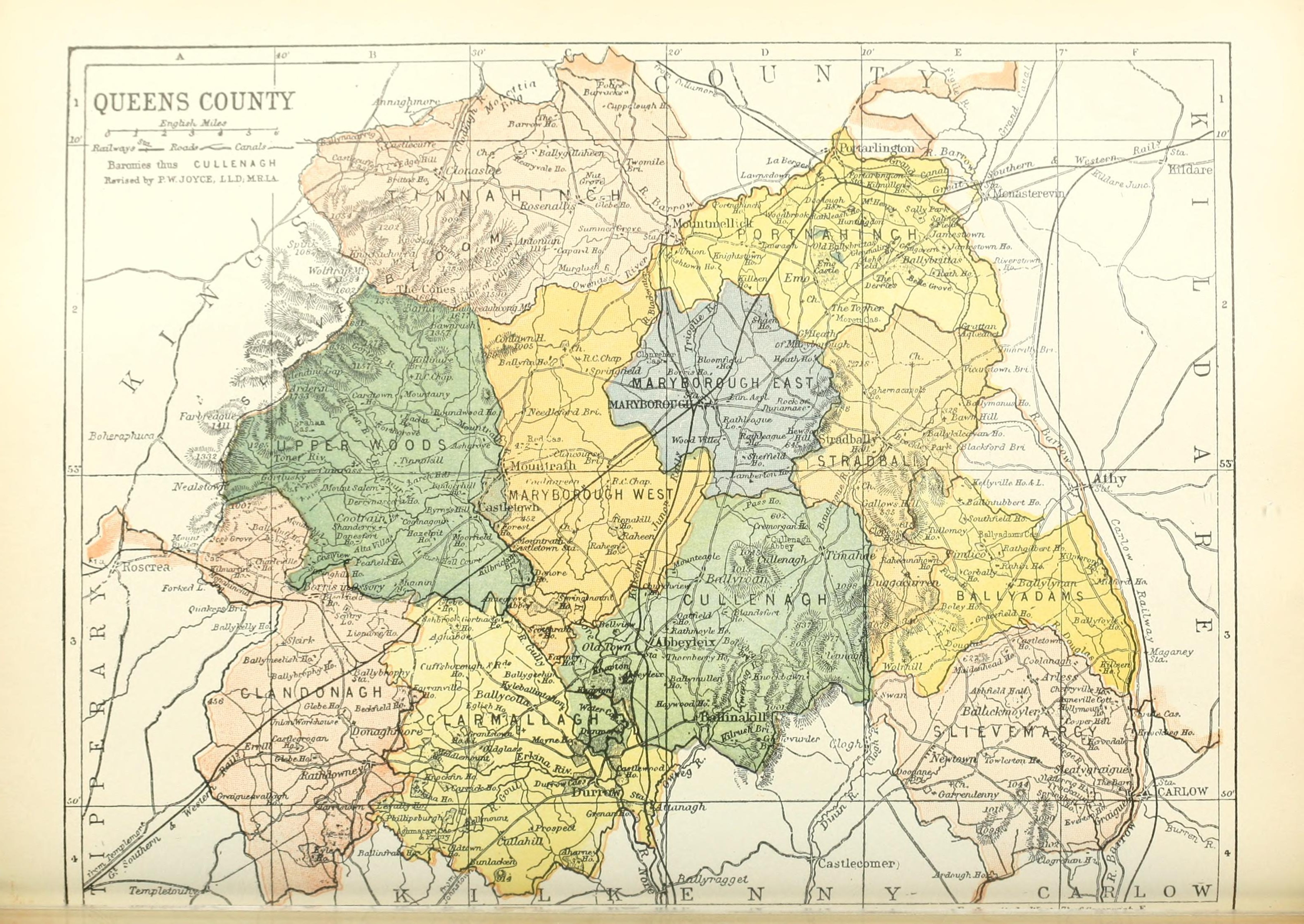
- Barony map of Queen's County, 1900; Upper Woods is forest green, in the west.
- Sovereign state: Ireland
- Province: Leinster
- County: Laois

Area
  - Total: 198.00 km^{2} (76.45 sq mi)

Upper Woods or Upperwoods (Irish: An Choill Uachtarach) is a barony in County Laois (formerly called Queen's County or County Leix), Ireland.

== Etymology ==
Upper Woods barony is named after the forests of the Slieve Bloom Mountains.

== Geography ==
Upper Woods is located in northwest County Laois, bounded to the northwest by the Slieve Bloom Mountains.

== History ==
Upper Woods was part of the ancient Kingdom of Ossory (Osraige). Around 1150 it was ruled by the Ua Dubhsláine (O'Delany) clan; the area was then called Tuath-an-Toraidh ("tuath [clan territory] of fruit/wealth/produce"). A member, Daniel Dulany the Elder (1685–1753), born in Upperwoods, became an important figure in colonial Maryland.

It is referred to in the topographical poem Tuilleadh feasa ar Éirinn óigh (Giolla na Naomh Ó hUidhrín, d. 1420):

Ard taoiseach tuaiṫe an toraiḋ
Ón Choill aoiḃinn Uachtoraiġ
Ó Duḃsláine, fial an fear
Ón tsliaḃ as áille inḃeaġ

("The high chief of the fruitful cantred, Of the delightful Coill Uachtorach [Upper Woods], Is O'Dubhslaine, hospitable the man, From the mountain of most beauteous rivers.")

Upper Woods was formerly a part of the Upper Ossory barony, established by 1657; in 1842 it was divided into three cantreds: Upper Woods, Clandonagh and Clarmallagh.

== List of settlements ==
Below is a list of settlements in Upper Woods barony:

- Coolrain
- Kilbricken
