= Clarmallagh =

Barony in County Laois, Ireland

Clarmallagh Clár Maí Locha (Irish)
- Barony
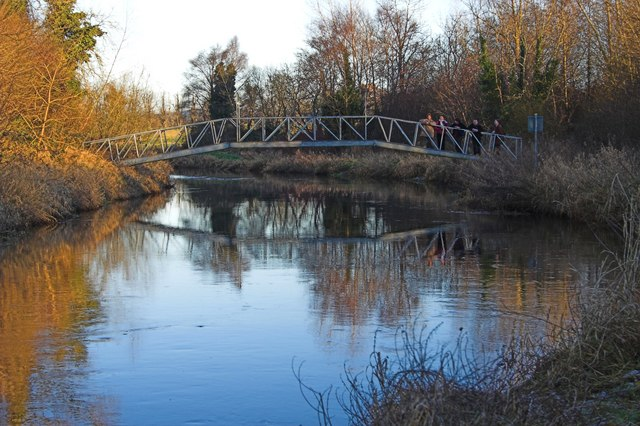
- River Erkina near Durrow

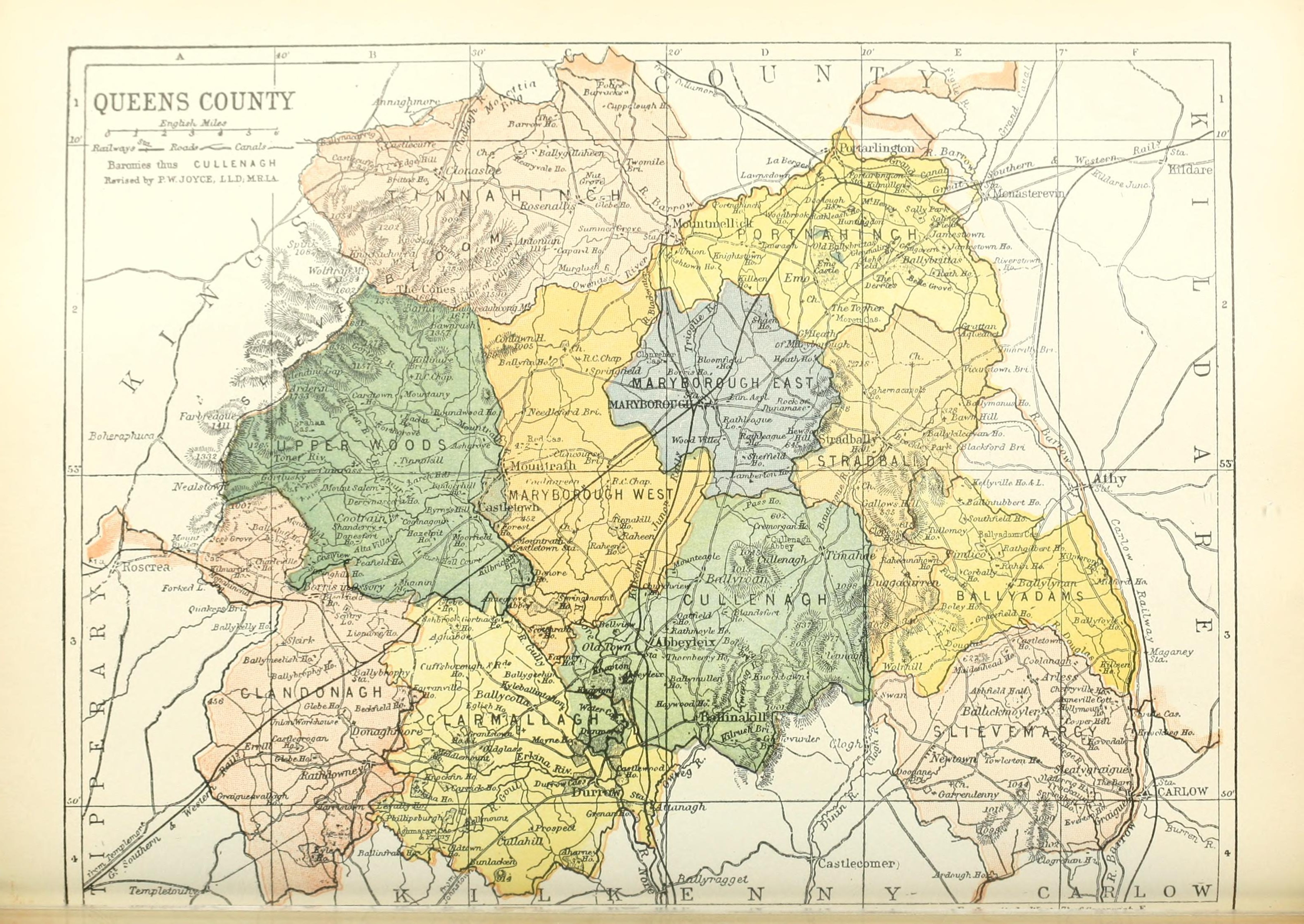
- Barony map of Queen's County, 1900; Clarmallagh is yellow, in the south.
- Sovereign state: Ireland
- Province: Leinster
- County: Laois

Area
  - Total: 176.17 km^{2} (68.02 sq mi)

Clarmallagh (Irish: Clár Maí Locha) is a barony in County Laois (formerly called Queen's County or County Leix), Ireland.

== Etymology ==
Clarmallagh means "Flat land of Maigh Locha [lake plain]", referring to Grantstown Lake.

== Geography ==
Clarmallagh is located in south County Laois, to the south of the River Gully, and to the north of the County Kilkenny border. It contains the lower part of the Erkina River where it drains into the River Nore.

== History ==
Clarmallagh barony was anciently the northernmost part of the Kingdom of Osraige (Ossory).

In the early 12th century, Finn Ua Caellaide ruled Magh Locha (Clarmallagh) separately from the rest of Ossory.

It was ruled by the Ó Faoláin (Phelan).

It is referred to in the topographical poem Tuilleadh feasa ar Éirinn óigh (Giolla na Naomh Ó hUidhrín, d. 1420):

I Muiġ Laċa na learg te
Ó Faoláin, fearḋa an fíne
Mór an dúthaiġ as díol dáiḃ
Do lín futha Ó Faoláin

("In Magh Lacha of the warm hill slopes is Ó Faolain of manly tribe; Extensive is the district due to them, which the Ó Faolains have filled.")

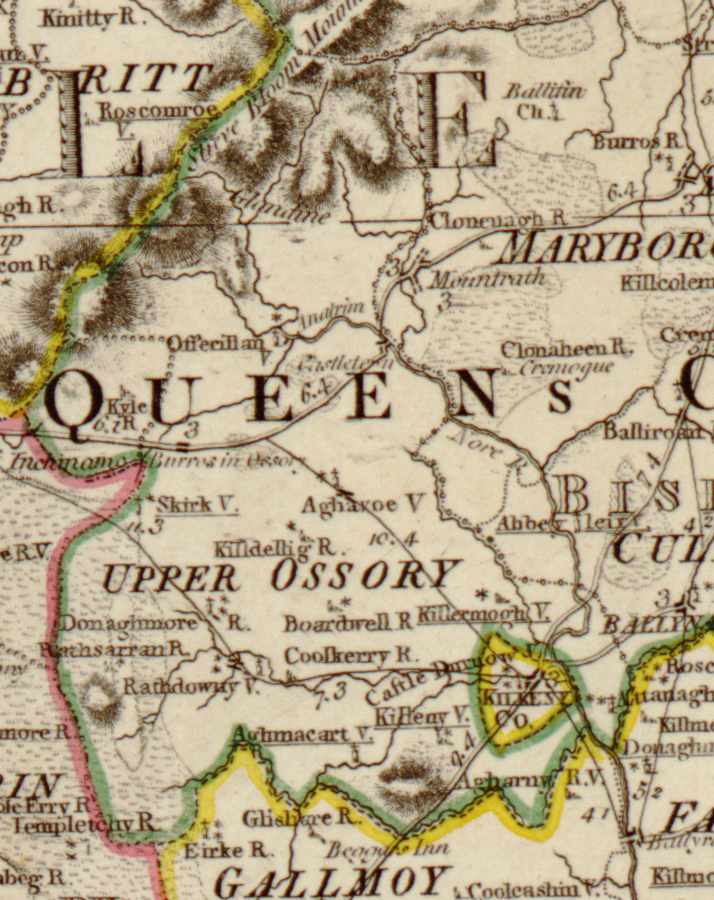
Map of Upper Ossory, 1797; in the 1846 reorganisation the Durrow exclave (yellow circle) was transferred from County Kilkenny to Clarmallagh and Queen's County.

Clarmallagh was formerly a part of the Upper Ossory barony, established by 1657; in 1842 it was divided into three cantreds: Upper Woods, Clandonagh and Clarmallagh.

== List of settlements ==
Below is a list of settlements in Clarmallagh barony:

- Abbeyleix
- Ballacolla
- Durrow
