= Surrender and regrant =

English legal procedure in 16th century Ireland

During the Tudor conquest of Ireland (c.1540–1603), "surrender and regrant" was the legal mechanism by which Irish clans were to be converted from a power structure rooted in clan and kin loyalties, to a late-feudal system under the English legal system. The policy was an attempt to incorporate the clan chiefs into the English-controlled Kingdom of Ireland, and to guarantee their property under English common law, as distinct from the traditional Irish Brehon law system. This strategy was the primary non-violent method for Crown officials in the Dublin Castle administration to subjugate Irish clan leaders during the conquest. It was an unanticipated consequence to be required to pay fealty in currency instead of trade labor or commodities. The process of "surrender and regrant" thus created new, unfamiliar debt structures among the Irish, and these debts had social and political consequences.

== Policy ==
The policy of surrender and regrant was led by King Henry VIII of England (r. 1509–1547) in a bid to extend and secure his control over the island of Ireland. This policy started in the years between the Geraldine rebellion (1534–39) and his subsequent creation of the Kingdom of Ireland in 1541–42. Henry's problem was that many of the Irish clans remained autonomous and outside the control of his administration in Dublin.

Gaelic chiefs and some autonomous Norman-Irish lords were actively encouraged to surrender their lands to the king, and then have them regranted (returned) as freeholds paying a chief rent under a royal charter if they swore loyalty to him. Those who surrendered were also expected to speak English, wear English-style dress, remain loyal to the Crown, follow English laws and customs, abjure the Roman Catholic Church, and convert to Henry's new Anglican Church.

In return they would be protected from attack and could organise local courts and enter the Parliament of Ireland.

The initiative of "surrender and regrant" was launched in the 1540s under the new English Governor of Ireland, Anthony St. Leger. Essentially St. Leger's idea was to transform and assimilate the more autonomous leaders of Gaelic Ireland into something akin to the political and constitutional system of England, where everyone was theoretically equal at law under the monarch.

=== First steps ===
It had begun successfully in the late 1530s, according to the Rev. James MacCaffrey, writing in 1914:

"Three years later (1537) MacGillapatrick (Fitzpatrick) of Ossory promised faithfully to abolish the usurped jurisdiction of the Pope, to have the English language spoken in his territories, and to send his son to be brought up with a knowledge of the English language and customs. In return for this he received a royal grant of his land and possessions, was created Baron of Colthill and Castleton, and was promised a seat in the House of Lords, a favour which he obtained in 1543, when he was appointed a peer with the title of Baron of Upper Ossory. Brian O'Conor Faly of Offaly and his rival Cahir, Baron of Ballyane made their submission in March 1538. They renounced the jurisdiction of the Pope, agreed to hold their lands from the king, and to abandon all claims to tribute or black rent from their neighbours of the Pale. Brian O'Connor was created Baron of Offaly. He was followed in his submission by the Earl of Desmond (1541), MacWilliam Burke, O'Brien of Thomond, Manus O'Donnell (August 1541) and finally by Con O'Neill (1542). All these, together with a host of minor chieftains and dependents, renounced the authority of the Pope, accepted re-grants of their lands from the king, begged for English titles, and did not think it beneath their dignity to accept gifts of money and robes. Con O'Neill became Earl of Tyrone, his son Matthew Baron of Dungannon, O'Brien Earl of Thomond, his nephew Donogh Baron of Ibricken, MacWilliam Burke Earl of Clanrickard, while knighthoods were distributed freely among the lesser nobles."

=== Clan chiefs who took part ===
In the late 1530s and early 1540s, a number of leading Gaelic families saw the political value of accepting this new Tudor policy. In 1541, Brían Óg Mac Giolla Phádraig became the first Irish lord to take his seat in the Dublin Parliament as Baron Upper Ossory. Other clans who partook in the process included the O'Neills of Tir Eoghain who were created the earls of Tyrone and as such sat in the Irish House of Lords from 1542. Many of the regranted clan chiefs remained Roman Catholic after the death of Queen Mary in 1558, which, after the final split between England and Rome in 1570, meant that their new legal status was still rather tangential in the eyes of conformist officials.

In 1543 the O'Briens of Thomond were created lords Inchiquin. His neighbour Donogh O'Grady was knighted and had his lands regranted in the same year. The Mac Aonghusa / Magennis clan in county Down became knights, and the O'Byrnes of Wicklow, the Kavanaghs of Wicklow, Cahir, Baron of Ballyane Lords of Ballyane, the O'Donnells of Donegal were others who accepted the system. The O'Donnell chief was created an earl briefly by James I of England in 1603–07. The Clanricarde Burke took the title of earl in 1543.

The O'Shaughnessys of Gort and the O'Driscolls of Corcu Loígde also became knights.

Ruairí Caoch Ó Mórdha (Rory O'More; the father of Rory O'More) of Laois surrendered and was regranted in 1542–43 but died in 1545. His clan was out of favour by 1550; in 1556 Laois was shired as the "Queen's County".

Other clans such as the MacMahons of County Monaghan did not take part in the new system.

Tibbot ne Long Bourke, the heir of "Lower MacWilliam Burke" lands in County Mayo, and a son of Gráinne O'Malley, remained outside the system until 1593; he was knighted in 1604 and was created the first Viscount Mayo in 1627. Gráinne herself accepted the system in 1576, in respect of her own lands, though she managed her lands with a high degree of autonomy over the next two decades. Donnel O'Donovan, chief of the largest sept of the O'Donovans of County Cork offered a surrender of their sept lands in 1592 (with similar offers by Conoghor O’Kallaghane, Conoghor O’Mahoney and Teig M’Owen Carty), to personally receive back the sept lands by patent. The surrender to Queen Elizabeth was not effected until 1608, to James I; Donnel O'Donovan received the sept lands as his personal estate in 1615, but did not receive an English title. The overlord in the Barony of Carbery to Donovan of Clan Cathail, the MacCarthy Reagh, who surrendered his sept lands in 1606, also never received any titles under this system. Donal McCarthy Mór was knighted in 1558 and created Earl of Clancare in 1565, but resigned his titles in 1597. The prominent MacCarthys of Muskerry, a separate dynasty, were later created the Viscounts Muskerry in 1628 and Earls of Clancarty in 1658. The chief of the Maguire clan of Fermanagh was created Baron Maguire in 1628. In 1631 Sir Terence Dempsey was created Viscount Clanmalier.

Randal MacDonnell was knighted in 1602, was granted estates in 1603 and was created Earl of Antrim in 1620.

== Effect on Irish heraldry ==
Because of the number of new lords in the Irish House of Lords and the demise of the former Ireland King of Arms, the office of the Ulster King of Arms was founded in 1552, based at Dublin Castle. Consequently, a large number of ancient Irish family trees were recorded and stored at the castle and later held at Trinity College Dublin. Almost all of the Irish surname coats of arms were granted in or after 1552, and are supervised now by the Chief Herald of Ireland.

== Conflict with Gaelic law ==
The Gaelic derbfine elective kingship method in Gaelic law clashed with surrender and regrant, as male relations as distantly related as great-grandsons of a former chief or king were eligible to vote and to be elected to succeed as chief. Often, that meant that several dozen men were eligible to be elected clan chief. This inevitably led to problems since under the new policy, it was possible for those individuals to become tenants of their chiefly cousin who had adopted surrender and regrant. Often the latter had an elected tánaiste, or deputy chief, who was pushed aside as the next chief by the son of the chief under the system of primogeniture. That caused internal feuding, which was often exploited by English officials based in Dublin, seeking to limit a clan's power or to take some or all of its lands.

That was a major cause of the ultimate failure in many cases of the policy of surrender and regrant. The tensions within clans and the new religious division between Catholics and Protestants from 1570, intrusions by grasping royal officials and the lack of royal protection from continuing raids by other clans that had not accepted the new system all made the policy frequently unworkable. Given the wars of 1595–1603, 1641–53 and 1689–91, few of the surviving clans emerged with their lands intact by 1700. In other cases, such as the Inchiquin dynasty, it clearly worked.

== See also ==
- Anthony St Leger (Lord Deputy of Ireland)
