= Barnaby Fitzpatrick, 5th Baron Upper Ossory =

Barnaby Fitzpatrick (Irish: Brian Mac Giolla Phádraig), 5th Baron Upper Ossory (died c. 1639–41) was the son and heir of Teige Fitzpatrick, 4th Baron Upper Ossory.

== Family and life ==
Barnaby inherited the Barony of Upper Ossory from his father Teige Fitzpatrick, 4th Baron Upper Ossory, great-grandson of Barnaby Fitzpatrick, 1st Baron Upper Ossory and lineal descendant of the former kings of Osraige. His mother was Joan Butler, daughter of Sir Edmund Butler, son of James Butler, 9th Earl of Ormond. On 14 July 1634, he took his seat in Parliament. He married Margaret Butler, eldest daughter of Walter Butler, 11th Earl of Ormond. He died sometime before 16 March 1639/40, according to William Carrigan or by 1641 by other sources.

From his wife Margaret Butler, he had issue:

- Brian, a.k.a. Barnaby Fitzpatrick, 6th Baron Upper Ossory, his heir and successor
- Edward Fitzpatrick (or Edmund)
- James Fitzpatrick

== Notes ==
Peerage of Ireland
Preceded by Teige Fitzpatrick	Baron Upper Ossory; 1627–1640	Succeeded by Barnaby Fitzpatrick
