= Barnaby Fitzpatrick =

Irish military officer and politician

The Right Honourable The Lord Upper Ossory
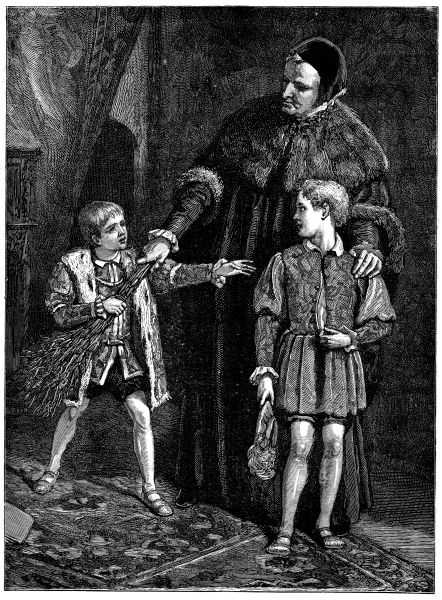
- Fitzpatrick (right) in "Edward VI and his Whipping Boy", an 1882 illustration by Walter Sydney Stacey

2nd Baron Upper Ossory
- In office 1576–1581
- Preceded by: Brian Fitzpatrick
- Succeeded by: Florence Fitzpatrick

Personal details
- Born: c. 1535 Ireland
- Died: 11 September 1581 Dublin, Ireland
- Spouse: Joan Fitzpatrick (nee Eustace)
- Children: Margaret Fitzpatrick
- Parent(s): Barnaby Fitzpatrick, 1st Baron Upper Ossory, Margaret Butler

Barnaby Fitzpatrick, 2nd Baron Upper Ossory (c. 1535 – 11 September 1581) was an Irish military officer and politician. He was educated at the court of Henry VIII of England with Edward, Prince of Wales. While he was in France, he corresponded regularly with King Edward VI. He was active in suppressing Wyatt's rebellion in 1553. He went home to Ireland, where he would have a lifelong feud with the Earl of Ormonde. His wife and daughter were abducted in 1573 by the Grace family, supposedly at Ormonde's instigation. He killed his cousin, the rebel Rory O'More in 1578.

== Early life ==
Fitzpatrick was the eldest son and heir of Barnaby Fitzpatrick, 1st Baron Upper Ossory and Margaret, eldest daughter of Piers Butler, 8th Earl of Ormond. (Note: Fitzpatrick was Margaret's third husband; she was the widow of Richard Mór Burke and Thomas FitzGerald (of Desmond)) He was born in Ireland, probably about 1535. Sent at an early age into England as a pledge of his father's loyalty, he was educated at court, where he became the closest companion of Edward, Prince of Wales, later Edward VI, with whom he was to remain on close terms until the death of the latter. He was among the chief mourners at the funeral of King Henry VIII, the father of Edward. On 15 August 1551 he and Sir Robert Dudley were sworn two of the six gentlemen of the King Edward's privy chamber.

== In France ==
Edward, who continued to take a kindly interest in Barnaby, sent him the same year into France in order to perfect his education, sagely advising him to "behave himself honestly, more following the company of gentlemen, than pressing into the company of the ladies there". Introduced by the Lord High Admiral, Lord Clinton, to Henry II, he was by him appointed a Gentleman of the Chamber, in which position he had favourable opportunities for observing the course of French politics. On his departure on 9 December 1552, he was warmly commended for his conduct by Henry himself and the Constable Montmorency. During his residence in France, Edward VI continued to correspond regularly with him. (Note: Dunlop 1889, p. 190 notes that much of this correspondence has survived and has been printed in the Literary Remains of Edward VI, published by the Roxburghe Club, i. 63–92. (Some of these letters had previously been printed by Fuller in his Worthies of England and Church History of Britain; by Horace Walpole in 1772, reprinted in the Dublin University Magazine, xliv. 535, and by Halliwell-Phillipps in his Letters of the Kings of England, vol. ii., and in Gentlemen's Magazine, lxii. 704.))

== In England ==
On his return to England Fitzpatrick took an active part in the suppression of Wyatt's rebellion (1553). The same year, as transcribed in the Chronicle of Queen Jane by Nichols that "the Erle of Ormonde, Sir [blank] Courteney Knight, and Mr. Barnaby fell out in the night with a certayn priest in the streate, whose parte a gentyllman comyng by chance took, and so they fell by the eares; so that Barnabye was hurte. The morrowe they were ledd by the ii sheryves to the counter in the Pultry, where they remained [blank] daies".

== In Ireland ==
Shortly afterwards Fitzpatrick went into Ireland with the Earl of Kildare and Brian O'Conor Faly, (Baron Offaly). It is stated both by Collins and Lodge that he was in 1558 present at the Siege of Leith, and that he was there knighted by the Duke of Norfolk; but for this, there appears to be no authority. He sat in the Parliament of Ireland of 1559. In 1566 he was knighted by Sir Henry Sidney, who seems to have held him in high estimation. His proceedings against Edmund Butler for complicity with Fitzmaurice in the Desmond Rebellions were deeply resented by Thomas Butler, 10th Earl of Ormond, and led to a lifelong feud between them. In 1573 the Grace family, who were at odds with Fitzpatrick, abducted his wife and daughter and Fitzpatrick suspected that Ormond was behind the abduction. Fitzpatrick appealed to Sidney to intervene on his behalf, but employed the notorious felon Piers Grace to rescue his daughter. Although his wife was returned unharmed, Fitzpatrick and his brothers retaliated by spoiling the Earl of Ormond's lands. The feud between the Fitzpatricks and the Graces continued into the next century: in 1602 Richard Grace, a relative of Piers Grace, murdered Barnaby's grandson, John Butler of Dunboyne.

In 1574 the Earl of Ormond made fresh allegations against Fitzpatrick's loyalty, and he was summoned to Dublin to answer before the council, where he successfully acquitted himself. In 1576 he succeeded his father, who had long been impotent, as Baron Upper Ossory, and two years afterwards had the satisfaction of killing the great rebel Rory O'More.

Owing to a series of charges preferred against him by Ormond, who declared that there was "not a naughtier or more dangerous man in Ireland than the baron of Upper Ossory", Fitzpatrick and his wife were on 14 January 1581 committed to Dublin Castle. There was, however, "nothing to touch him", he being in Sir Henry Wallop's opinion "as sound a man to her majesty as any of his nation".

== Family ==
In 1560 Fitzpatrick married Joan, daughter of Rowland Eustace, 2nd Viscount Baltinglass and his wife Joan Butler. They had a daughter, Margaret, who was the first wife of James Butler, 2nd Baron Dunboyne, with whom she had two sons John (murdered in 1602), and Piers (died 1626). Before his death, John had a son, Edmund Butler, who was raised by his grandfather James.

== Death ==
Fitzpatrick seems to have been suddenly taken ill, and on 11 September 1581, he died in the house of William Kelly, surgeon, Dublin, at two o'clock in the afternoon. He was, said Sir Henry Sidney, "the most sufficient man in counsel and action for the war that ever I found of that country birth; great pity it was of his death". Upon Fitzpatrick's death his estates and title passed to his brother Florence Fitzpatrick.

== Sources ==
Much correspondence between Sir Barnaby and his many friends, including the young king Edward VI has been collected and printed, some at first by Horace Walpole at Strawberry Hill House and later fully appearing in Literary Remains of King Edward the Sixth.

== Role as Proxy ==
While the popular image of young Sir Barnaby as Edward VI's whipping boy persists on the basis of their great friendship, historian Leanda de Lisle has noted the lack of contemporary evidence for this scenario, suggesting it is a modern popular myth based on assumptions stemming from the later development of the Divine right of kings.

== Modern portrayals ==
Albert Davies played Sir Barnaby Fitzpatrick in the 1936 film Tudor Rose. Robert Arthur was cast as a teenage Barnaby in the 1953 film Young Bess.

Barnaby Fitzpatrick appears in Heirs of Squire Harry (1974), and in the young adult novel Timeless Love (2002) by Judith O'Brien.

== See also ==
- Baron Upper Ossory
- Mac Giolla Phádraig dynasty
- Upper Ossory

== Notes ==
Peerage of Ireland
Preceded by Barnaby Fitzpatrick	Baron Upper Ossory; 1575–1581	Succeeded by Florence Fitzpatrick
