= O Doyne manuscript =

The O Doyne manuscript is a collection of material relating to a dispute among the Gaelic-Irish family of Dunne.

Kenneth Nicholls has described its contents as

"contemporary copies of documents concerning the lengthy lawsuit between Charles O Doyne (Cathaoir Ó Duinn), a Master in the Irish Court of Chancery who died in 1617, and his elder brother, Thady or Teig (Thadhg) Ó Duinn ... It is precious as a complete record of the landownership pattern in a Gaelic-Irish territory which had remained practically free from outside interference."

Charles and Thady were sons of Tadhg Óg Ó Duinn, a landowner and lord of Úi Riagán in Laois from 1558 to 1607. The dispute concerned the succession to Tadhg Óg's lands and chiefries. In the dispute, Nicholls remarks that it was "Charles, the English-educated lawyer and official, who sought to maintain the validity of the customs of tanistry and 'Irish gavelkind' which his brother the chief denounced as 'barbarous.'

Charles died without issue on 17 May 1617, his heir been his nephew, Brian Óg Ó Duinn or Barnaby O Doyne, who was the ancestor to the family of Dunne of Brittas. A later member of this family was Sir Robert Doyne (1651–1733).

It is now held in Marsh's Library, shelf-numbered as Z.4.2.19.

== See also ==
- Irish Manuscripts Commission
- Marsh's Library
- Críchad an Chaoilli
- Crichaireacht cinedach nduchasa Muintiri Murchada
