= Cullahill Mountain =

Marilyn hill in County Laois, Ireland

- Knockmannon Hill, Culla Hills
- Location within Ireland

Highest point
- Elevation: 313 m (1,027 ft)
- Prominence: 151
- Listing: Marilyn
- Coordinates: 52.800245°N 7.473879°W

Naming
- Native name: Sliabh na Cúlchoille (Irish)
- English translation: Mountain of the Hazel Wood

Geography
- Location: County Laois
- Country: Ireland
- OSI/OSNI grid: S379710
- Topo map: OSi Discovery 68

Cullahill Mountain (Irish: Sliabh na Cúlchoille, meaning 'mountain of the hazel wood') is listed as a marilyn hill and a Special Area of Conservation in County Laois, Ireland. Cullahill with an elevation of 313 m (1,027 ft) gives its name to the local townland. It is also called Knockmannon Hill.

Cullahill Mountain takes its name from an ancient forest that covered the hill and extended down to Cullahill Castle and the village of Cullahill. The first mention of the area was about 1460 where it was called na Cúlchailli and later in 1540 it was called "Cowlekyll".

Cullahill Mountain contains a walking trail. There is population of rare green-winged orchid and on the downslope there is an ash and hazel woodland. It is situated on the Castlecomer Plateau, along the main N8 road between Durrow in County Laois and Johnstown, County Kilkenny.

== Geography ==
County Laois consists of a central plain, surrounded by a number of upland areas including the Slieve Bloom Mountains in the northwest, Killeshin Plateau in the south east and Cullahill Mountain in the south. Cullahill Mountain lies on a western side of the Castlecomer Plateau. It forms the northern boundary to the valley running from Ballyragget to Freshford, County Kilkenny. The location is off the M8 motorway, 15 km north-east of Urlingford and Johnstown, County Kilkenny, or south-west from Durrow along the R639 road.

Cullahill Mountain is listed as Special Area of Conservation under the European Union Habitats Directive. The site has a large population of green-winged orchid which is a rare species that is legally protected under the Irish governments Flora Protection Order (1987). The orchid flora of the grassland is notably rich, with twayblade, frog orchid, bee orchid, early-purple orchid and green-winged orchid. The west side of site extends downslope to an ash and hazel woodland.

Most of vegetation at the site is herb-rich grassland over limestone. With about 5 grass species, 2 sedges and 20 broad-leaved herbs and allows a rich insect fauna to maintain itself. Grasses found include quaking-grass, crested dog's-tail, sheep's-fescue, downy oat-grass and yellow oat-grass. Amongst these grasses is mouse-ear hawkweed, wild thyme, bird's-foot-trefoil, lady's bedstraw, carline thistle, mountain everlasting, purging flax and eyebright.

== Recreation ==
A scenic walking route called Cullahill mountain goes through forests and farm land in partnership with Laois/Offaly Walking Partnership and Cullahill Rural Development Association. The walk begins at Cullahill village, and is a 10 km walk along field paths, forest tracks, lanes and minor roadways.

Passing Cummer Well and a ring fort, it tracks the low hills above the village of Cullahill. The walk provides views of the Slieve Bloom mountains to the north west, the Comeraghs and Galtees to the south west, and the Blackstairs and Wicklow Mountains to the east. Keeper Hill and Slievenamon mountains can also be seen.

Some off-road cycling occurs in the area.

== See also ==
- List of mountains in Ireland
- List of Special Areas of Conservation in the Republic of Ireland
- List of Marilyns in Ireland
