= Triallam timcheall na Fodla =

Medieval Irish topographical text

Triallam timcheall na Fodla ("Let us wander around Ireland") is medieval Irish-language poetic manuscript about topography.

== Overview ==
Composed by Seán Mór Ó Dubhagáin, Triallam consists of twenty verses divided into four (but sometimes five or even six) lines. The full poem is nine hundred and sixteen lines in length. It identifies various tribes, dynasties and territories of the Gaelic-Irish, as they were immediately before the arrival of the Anglo-Normans. Ó Dubhagáin devotes one hundred and fifty-two lines to Meath, three hundred and fifty-four to Ulster, three hundred and twenty-eight to Connacht, and fifty-six to Leinster. Possibly the work was unfinished at the time of Ó Dubhagáin's death in 1372; sometime after Ó Dubhagáin's death, Giolla na Naomh Ó hUidhrín (d. 1420) completed the poem.

== See also ==
- Críchad an Chaoilli
- Crichaireacht cinedach nduchasa Muintiri Murchada
- Tuilleadh feasa ar Éirinn óigh
- Giolla na Naomh Ó hUidhrín
- Leabhar Adhamh Ó Cianáin
