= Críchad an Chaoilli =

Medieval Irish text

- Language: Middle Irish
- Date: between 1100 and 1300
- Manuscript(s): Book of Lismore, on folio 140a, 2; Egerton 92, folio 13b

Críchad an Chaoilli ("boundary of the Caoille") is a medieval Irish text.

== Overview ==
Written in Middle Irish sometime between 1100 and 1300, Críchad an Chaoilli is a topographical text that takes its title from its opening verse:

Crichad an caoilli gu cruaidh
in fuil uaibh nech noimluaidh ?
tucad do mac Sonaisc sin
ar an forbhais d'fhoirdhin

which translates as

The exact boundary of the Caoille,
is there anyone of you who would describe it?
It was given to the son of Sonasc
for assisting at the siege.

The rest of the text is written in prose, and describes the land and proprietors of Fermoy, County Cork, an area originally known as the kingdom of Caoille or Fir Maige Féne.

It survives in two manuscripts – Book of Lismore, on folio 140a, 2; and in Egerton 92, fo. 13b, preserved in the British Library, London.

== Authorship ==
Its unknown author is thought to have been a monastic scribe.

== See also ==
- Crichaireacht cinedach nduchasa Muintiri Murchada
- Triallam timcheall na Fodla
- Seán Mór Ó Dubhagáin
- Giolla na Naomh Ó hUidhrín

== Manuscript sources ==
- Cork, University College Cork, Book of Lismore, fo. 140a, 2.
- London, British Library, Egerton 92, fo. 13b.

== Editions ==
- J. G. O'Keeffe (ed.), The ancient territory of Fermoy, Ériu 10 (1926–28), 170–89.
- P. Power (ed.), Crichad an Chaoilli being the Topography of Ancient Fermoy (Dublin 1932).

== Articles ==
- Eithne Donnelly, The Roches, Lords of Fermoy: the history of a Norman-Irish family, in Journal of the Cork Historical and Archaeological Society39 (1934), 38–40, 57–68; 40 (1935), 37–42, 63–73; 41 (1936), 20–28, 78–84; 42 (1937), 40–52.
- T. F. O'Rahilly, Some Fermoy placenames, Ériu, 12 (1938), 254–256.
- Liam Ó Buachalla, Placenames of north-east Cork, J.C.H.A.S. 54 (1949) 31–34.
- Liam Ó Buachalla, Contributions towards the political history of Munster, in J.C.H.A.S. 56 (1951), 87–90; 57 (1952) 67–86; 59 (1954) 111–26; 61 (1956) 89–102.
- Liam Ó Buachalla, Townland development in the Fermoy area, 12th century–19th century, Dinnseanchas 1 (1965), 87–92.
- Liam Ó Buachalla, An early fourteenth-century placenames list for Anglo-Norman Cork, Dinnseanchas 3/2 (1967), 39–50.
- F. X. Martin, The first Normans in Munster, in J.C.H.A.S. 76 (1971), 48–71.
- Niall Brunicardi, Fermoy to 1790: a local history (Fermoy: Eigse na Mainistreach), 1975.
- C. J. F. MacCarthy, Éigse Chaoille: an introduction to the literature of ancient Fermoy, in Mallow Field Club Journal 6 (1988) 134–155.
- Kenneth Nicholls, The development of Lordship in County Cork, 1300–1600, in: P. O'Flanagan and C.G. Buttimer (eds), Cork History and Society. Interdisciplinary Essays on the history of an Irish County (Dublin 1993) 157–211.
- Donnchadh Ó Corráin, Corcu Loígde: land and families, in O'Flanagan and Buttimer, Cork History and Society, 63–81.
- Paul MacCotter & K. W. Nicholls, The pipe roll of Cloyne (Rotulus pipæ Clonensis), Cloyne, Midleton, Co. Cork, 1996.
- Diarmuid Ó Murchadha, Cenn Ebrat, Sliab Caín, Belach Ebrat, Belach Legtha/Lechta, Éigse 29 (1996), 153–71.
- M. A. Monk & John Sheehan (eds), Early Munster: Archaeology, Sistory and Society (Cork 1998) 59–64.
- Denise Power et al., Archaeological inventory of County Cork (4 vols, Dublin 1992–2000).
- J. O'Meara, Mallow-Fermoy-Mitchelstown, in Journal of the Irish Railway Record Society 22 (2004) pp. 17–33.
- Edel Bhreathnach, Críchad an Chaoilli: a medieval territory revealed, in J.C.H.A.S, 110 (2005), pp. 85–96.
- Paul MacCotter, Medieval Ireland: territorial, political and economic divisions, Dublin, 2008.
