= Baron Upper Ossory =

Barony in the Peerage of Great Britain

Barony of Upper Ossory
- Sable a saltire argent, on a chief azure three fleur-de-lis or
- Creation date: 11 June 1541 (first creation); 9 August 1794 (second creation)
- Created by: Henry VIII (first creation); George II (second creation)
- Peerage: Peerage of Ireland
- First holder: Barnaby Fitzpatrick
- Last holder: John FitzPatrick, 2nd Earl of Upper Ossory
- Remainder to: First baron's heirs male of the body lawfully begotten
- Extinction date: 13 February 1818
- Former seats: Cullahill Castle; Tentore, County Laois; Fermyn Woods Hall, Northamptonshire; Ampthill Park, Bedfordshire
- Motto: Fortis sub forte fatiscet ("The strong will yield to the strong")

Baron Upper Ossory was a title in the Peerage of Ireland. It was created on 11 June 1541 for Barnaby Fitzpatrick. This was in pursuance of the Surrender and regrant policy of King Henry VIII. Under the policy, Gaelic chiefs were actively encouraged to surrender their lands to the king and then have them regranted (returned) under a royal charter if they swore loyalty to him. Those who surrendered were also expected to speak English, wear English-style dress, remain loyal to the Crown, pay a rent and follow English laws and customs, abjure the Roman Catholic Church, and convert to Henry's new Anglican Church.

The second Baron, also named Barnaby, was raised at Henry's court, as a companion for the future King Edward VI. Edward, who had few friends, became deeply attached to young Barnaby, and their later letters testify to their warm and lasting friendship.

Upper Ossory was the northern third of the formerly larger Kingdom of Osraige.

== Barons Upper Ossory; First creation (1541) ==
- Barnaby Fitzpatrick, 1st Baron Upper Ossory (born Irish: Brían Óg Mac Giolla Phádraig) (c. 1485–1575)
- Barnaby Fitzpatrick, 2nd Baron Upper Ossory (c. 1535–1581)
- Florence Fitzpatrick, 3rd Baron Upper Ossory (died 1613)
- Thady or Teige Fitzpatrick, 4th Baron Upper Ossory (died 1627), who married Joan Butler, the daughter of Sir Edmund Butler of Cloughgrenan
- Barnaby Fitzpatrick, 5th Baron Upper Ossory (died c. 1638)
- Barnaby Fitzpatrick, 6th Baron Upper Ossory (died c. 1666)
- Barnaby Fitzpatrick, 7th Baron Upper Ossory (died 1696). On 11 May 1691, the seventh baron was attainted and the barony forfeited.

== Barons Upper Ossory; Second creation (1794) ==
The title was re-created on 9 August 1794 for the second Earl of Upper Ossory. On his death in 1818, both titles became extinct.

- John FitzPatrick, 2nd Earl of Upper Ossory (1745–1818) (extinct)

== See also ==
- Baron Castletown
- Baron Gowran
- Earl of Upper Ossory
- Kingdom of Ossory
