= James Brophy =

James Brophy may refer to:

- James Brophy (soldier) (1846–1929), American Medal of Honor recipient
- James Brophy (cricketer) (1912–1994), Irish cricketer
- James Brophy (footballer) (born 1994), English footballer
- James Brophy (public servant) (1889–1969), Australian public servant
