= Cullahill Castle =

Ruined castle in County Laois, Ireland

Coordinates: 52.8162°N 7.4729°W

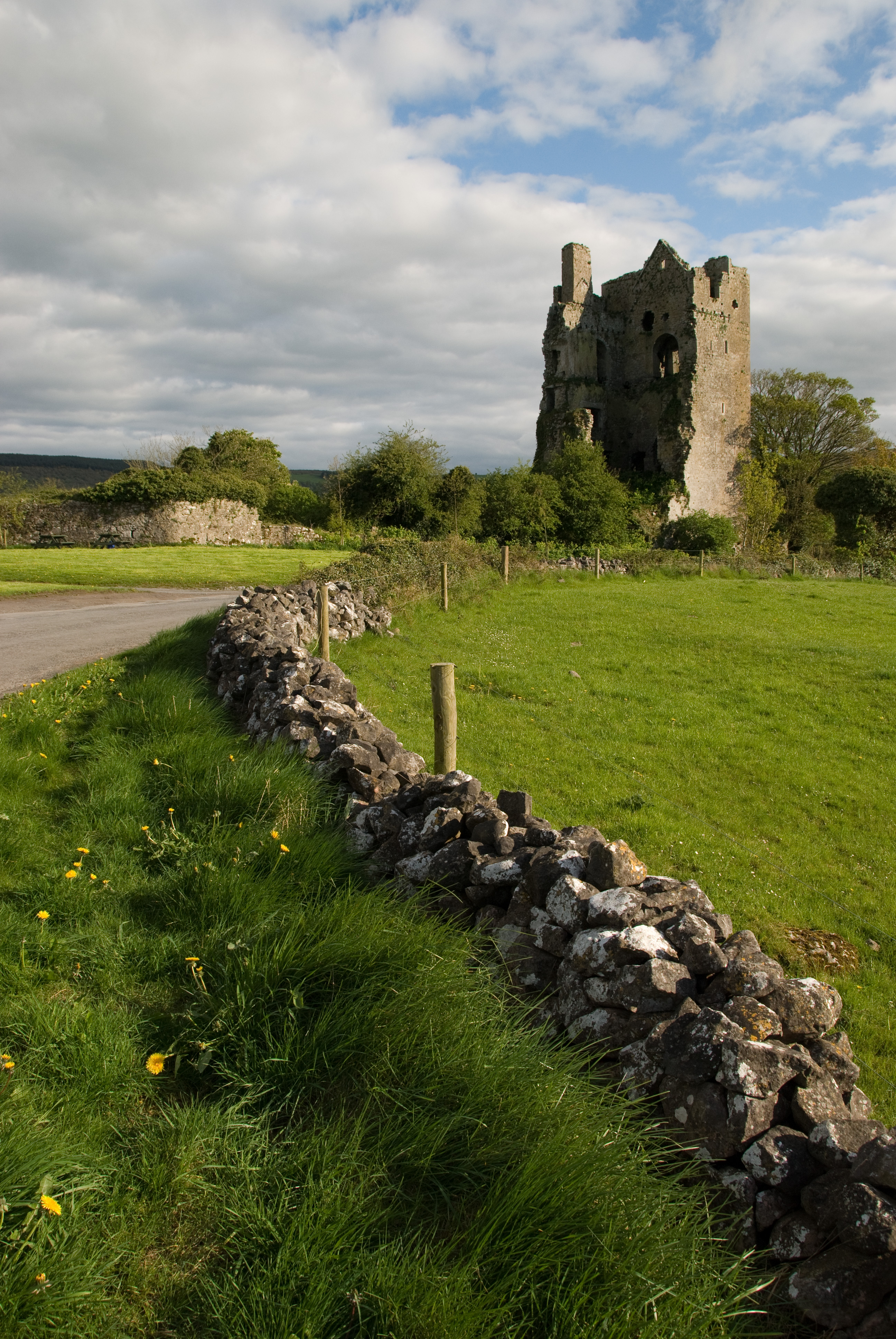
Cullahill Castle, April 2009.

Cullahill Castle was the principal stronghold of the MacGillapatricks of Upper Ossory built around 1425 and destroyed around 1650. Cullahill Castle takes its name from an ancient forest that covered Cullahill Mountain and extended down to Cullahill village.

== Location ==
In the village of Cullahill in County Laois, Ireland. Approximately 100 metres out on the road up the nearby hill that gives the area its name.

== History ==
Built around 1425, probably by Finghin MacGillapatrick

Reportedly came under attack on several occasions by the "sovereign and citizens of Kilkenny" under reward from King Henry VI. Such attacks were reported in 1441 and 1517.

It was attacked and partially destroyed by Cromwell's forces around 1650. It was probably attacked by cannon from a nearby hill.

It was recorded as "ruinous and uninhabitated" in 1657.

== Structure ==
It is a tower-house rising to five storeys. Most of the northern portion, including the doorway, is missing. It is vaulted above the ground floor and has mural passages and chambers. A straight mural stairway rises to the upper levels. There are remains of mullioned windows at the higher floors of the castle.

The castle has a Sheela na Gig mounted on the outer wall behind the chimney.

Across the road lies the ruins of its chapel which was the private chapel of the Catholic lords of Upper Ossory.
