= Clan Moroghoe =

- Parent house: Laigin
- Country: Ireland
- Founder: Murcha/Murchadh, a descendant of Énnae Cennsalach
- Titles: King of Leinster; King of Uí Ceinnselaig
- Cadet branches: MacMorough; MacMorrow; Morrow; O'Morrow

The Clan Moroghoe is an Irish clan, descended from Murcha, who was a descendant of Labhradh, the son of Breasal Bealach. From Murcha came the patronymic MacMuircha or MacMurchadha which, according to John O'Hart, was anglicised as MacMorough, MacMorrow and Morrow. There are a number of spellings for the clan which include, MacMurroghowe, MacMoroghoe, Murroghowe, Moroghoe, Morrow and Murrow. Eventually these names were anglicised into the more recognisable Murrow, MacMorrow, Morrow and (occasionally) Morrowson.
