= Hugh Brophy =

Irish retired footballer

Personal information
- Date of birth: 2 September 1948 (age 78)
- Place of birth: Dublin, Ireland
- Position: Midfielder

Youth career
- Bolton Athletic

Senior career*
Years	Team	Apps	(Gls)
1965–1966	Shamrock Rovers		(1)
1966–1968	Crystal Palace	1	(0)
1968–1971	Shamrock Rovers	?	(10)
1971–1973	Bohemians		
- * Club domestic league appearances and goals

Hugh Brophy (born 2 September 1948) is an Irish retired footballer who played during the 1960s and 1970s.

Brophy was a midfielder who played for Shamrock Rovers and Bohemians amongst others during his career in the League of Ireland. Brophy played alongside the likes of Tommy Kelly and Turlough O'Connor during his time at Bohs.

He made his Rovers debut on 20 March 1966 against Drumcondra at Milltown. He signed for Crystal Palace in July 1966, but after only one league appearance as a substitute for Johnny Byrne in the last game of the 1966–67 season, left the club in 1967. He re-signed for Shamrock Rovers in November 1968, winning the FAI Cup in 1969.

He played for the Republic of Ireland national football team amateur team in the qualifiers for the 1967 UEFA Amateur Cup.
