= My Family's Slave =

2017 essay by Alex Tizon

- Author: Alex Tizon
- Language: English
- Genre: Autobiography
- Published in: The Atlantic
- Publication date: June 2017
- Publication place: United States
- Media type: Print and online

"My Family's Slave" is a non-fiction, biographical essay by the Pulitzer Prize-winning journalist Alex Tizon. It was the cover story of the June 2017 issue of The Atlantic. It was Tizon's final published story and was printed after his death in March 2017. He died on the day that The Atlantic's editorial staff decided the article would be featured on the magazine's front cover, before they could tell him of their decision. The story went viral on the Internet and generated extensive debate, receiving both praise and criticism. It was later translated into the author's native Tagalog language for The Atlantic's website.

== Background ==
The work recounts the life story of a Filipino woman, Eudocia Tomas Pulido, known to the author and his siblings as "Lola" (grandmother in Tagalog, which is not quite clear from the English text, and used in a honorific rather than literal sense), who lived with the author's family for 64 years, for most of that time as an unpaid or indentured servant and thus essentially as a slave, and who helped raise three generations of the author's family.

Pulido was a distant relation of the Tizon family, from a poorer branch of the clan. In the 1940s, due to poverty she sought to enter into servitude under the author's grandfather, a military officer during the Commonwealth Era, and then at the age of 18 was "given" to the author's then 12-year-old mother as a personal servant, which the author describes as his grandfather "tricking" her into serving his daughter, the author's mother, for life. Pulido came to the United States in 1964 on a special passport linked to the author's father, who was a diplomat. However, her travel papers expired in 1969, and she was ineligible for the permanent-resident status that the author's family received, making her an illegal immigrant in the U.S for the next two decades. She eventually received amnesty as a result of the Immigration Reform and Control Act of 1986, and she became a U.S. citizen in October 1998.

The Tizon family went through a tumultuous and indigent time as they moved from the Philippines to Los Angeles, to Seattle, and multiple other locations before settling in Oregon. The author's father quit his consular post, became a gambler and womanizer, and eventually abandoned the family. His mother worked long hours while studying medicine and eventually remarried. Pulido suffered continuous emotional and physical abuse and neglect from the author's parents, besides receiving no salary or remuneration for her services (which was a breach of a verbal agreement when persuading her to accompany them to the United States), and was not allowed to go home to attend both her parents' funerals, due to her illegal immigrant status and the risk of her exposure in turn exposing her employers as criminally liable. Nonetheless, Pulido steadfastly carried out her matriarchal duties, essentially serving as a surrogate mother to the Tizon children, who had to awkwardly gloss over her role in the household to their peers as she was both their honorary "grandmother" and servant. Eventually, the author and his siblings stood up for Pulido to their mother, calling her situation slavery, though Pulido remained in servitude.

After his mother's death, Alex Tizon brought Pulido, then aged 75, to live in his home with his family. Pulido was given a salary and encouraged to stop acting as a constant servant. Tizon paid for her to visit her home village in the Philippines when she was 83, after which she chose to return to the United States. Pulido died on November 7, 2011, at the age of 86, and Tizon later repatriated her ashes to her birthplace of Mayantoc, Tarlac.

== Reception ==
"My Family's Slave" went viral and sparked significant debate in both the United States and the Philippines after being published in The Atlantic. The Atlantic acknowledged these mixed reactions to the story with the article "Your Responses to ‘My Family’s Slave’" by assistant editor Rosa Inocencio Smith. Filipinos generally praised Tizon, while many Western commentators criticized him.

The article was lauded as "an honest, haunting tale" by the Chicago Tribune, but it also received criticism. The Washington Post noted that the article "drew wide praise, with readers commending Tizon's honesty, and some saying it was among the most powerful magazine pieces published in recent memory. But it also spurred intense criticism from some readers who felt it humanized a slave owner and others who described Tizon as being 'complicit in the systemic oppression of Filipino househelp'."

The Filipino magazine Scout argued that "a lot of the international outrage is coming from a place where they don't fully understand the culture the story is set in". The American magazine Slate also noted the "wide-sweeping judgment coming from people who have no context nor familiarity with Filipino culture, history, or economics". Slate further wrote that, as the Philippines is a developing country, "the wide disparity between those with and without money makes the culture of servitude a viable option for many born into poverty, especially in the provinces". The Washington Post wrote that many Filipinos expressed that "while they don't condone indentured servitude, Pulido's life was a much too common scenario ingrained in Filipino culture and one that must be confronted and openly discussed."

Author Randy Ribay questioned the moral high ground of those who criticized Tizon through mobile devices that were built with the use of child labor, and he added that "asking why [Tizon] wasn't better at doing what was right every step of the way isn't the most fruitful line of discussion. We are all complicit in a number of evils. We all perpetuate oppression throughout our daily lives."
