= Ballybrophy =

Village in County Laois, Ireland

Ballybrophy Baile Uí Bhróithe
- Village
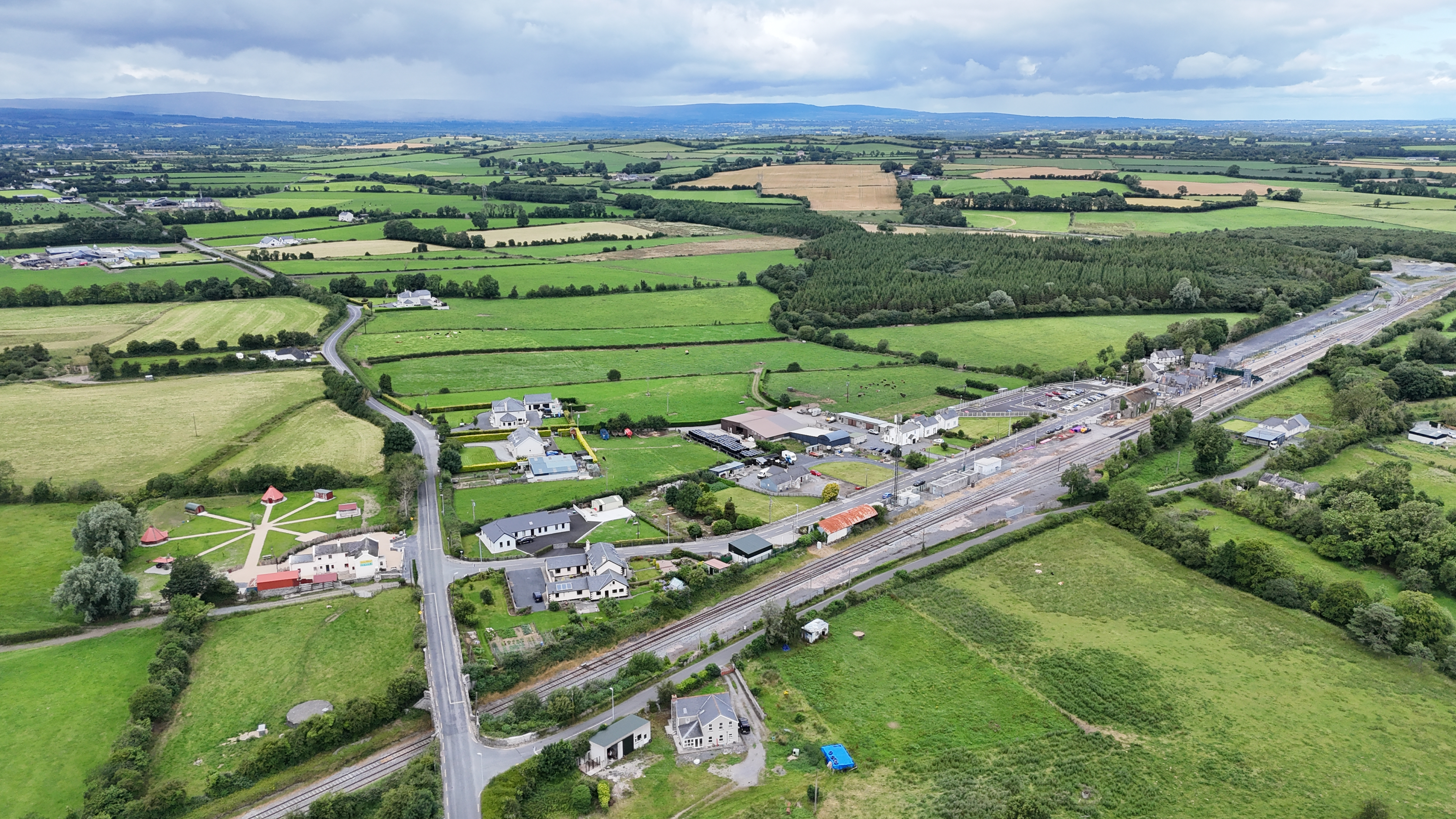

- Location in Ireland
- Coordinates: 52°54′N 7°36′W
- Country: Ireland
- Province: Leinster
- County: County Laois
- Time zone: UTC+0 (WET)
  - Summer (DST): UTC-1 (IST (WEST))

Ballybrophy (historically Ballybrohy, from Irish: Baile Uí Bhróithe, meaning 'townland of Ó Bróithe/Brophy') is a village in County Laois, Ireland. It had a population of 145 as of the 2002 census, and forms part of the Borris-in-Ossory electoral area. It is best known for the Ballybrophy railway station, which is at a junction on the country's main Dublin-Cork railway line.

== Transport ==
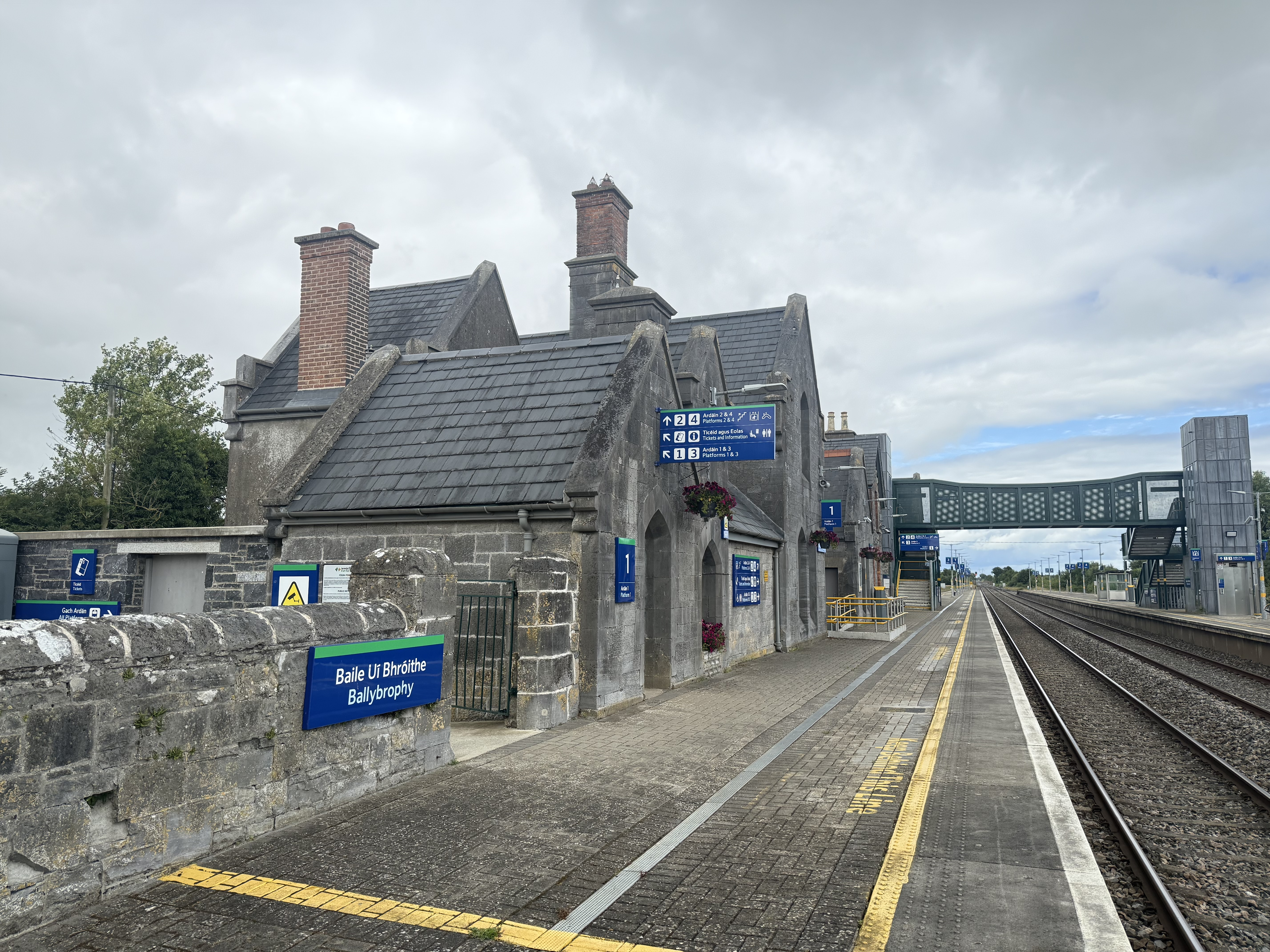
Ballybrophy railway station

Ballybrophy railway station is a connection point between the Dublin-Cork railway line and the Limerick–Ballybrophy railway line. Trains wishing to cross from the Limerick to the Dublin line must perform time-consuming reversals. The line is lightly travelled, because an alternative routing via Limerick Junction is quicker and more comfortable owing to newer track and fewer speed restrictions. The station opened on 1 September 1847.

Owing to the branch line's turn south to meet the line at Ballybrophy, some of those who favour retaining the line have theorised that continuing the line east with a stop at the more populated Borris-in-Ossory, joining the line nearer Portlaoise would be better for Dublin connections. However, in addition to the substantial capital cost of this work, substantial parts of the line would still need to be relaid nearer Limerick in order to eliminate severe speed restrictions. Upgrades to the N7 road (now M7 motorway) also dissuade people from railway usage.

A report published in November 2016 suggested that the Limerick-Ballybrophy line was likely to close in 2018 to save money as the route was very lighty used.

== See also ==
- List of towns and villages in Ireland
