= Florence Fitzpatrick, 3rd Baron Upper Ossory =

Florence Fitzpatrick, 3rd Baron Upper Ossory (born Finghín Mac Giolla Phádraig; also known as Fineen Fitzpatrick) (died 3 February 1613), was the third son of Barnaby Fitzpatrick, 1st Baron Upper Ossory and his wife Margaret Butler, and inherited the title upon the death of his older brother Barnaby Fitzpatrick, 2nd Baron Upper Ossory in 1581. He married Catherine O'More, daughter of Patrick O'More of Abbeyleix, and had six children, including his son Teige, who succeeded as 4th Baron, and Joan (died c.1596/7) who married John Butler of Dunboyne (murdered in 1602), by whom she was the mother of Edmond Butler, 3rd/13th Baron Dunboyne.

== Notes ==
Peerage of Ireland
Preceded by Barnaby Fitzpatrick	Baron Upper Ossory; 1581–1619	Succeeded by Teige Fitzpatrick
