= Barnaby Fitzpatrick, 6th Baron Upper Ossory =

Barnaby Fitzpatrick (Irish: Brian Mac Giolla Phádraig), 6th Baron Upper Ossory, (d. 1666) was the heir and successor of Barnaby Fitzpatrick, 5th Baron Upper Ossory. The eldest son of Barnaby Fitzpatrick by his wife Margaret Butler, he took his seat in Parliament on 16 March 1639. He married Catherine Everard, daughter of Sir Edward Everard, and his heir was his eldest son, Barnaby.

== Notes ==
Peerage of Ireland
Preceded by Barnaby Fitzpatrick	Baron Upper Ossory; 1640–1666	Succeeded by Barnaby Fitzpatrick
