= Upper Ossory =

Barony in County Laois, Ireland

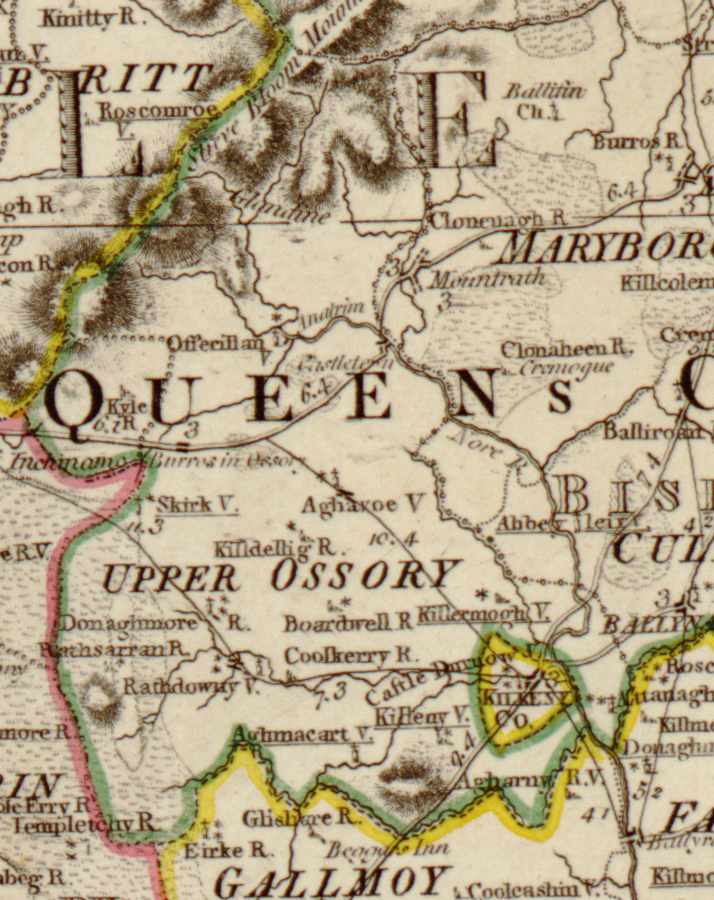
Upper Ossory in Daniel Beaufort's 1797 map of Ireland; it encloses Durrow, a detached part of County Kilkenny until 1842.

Upper Ossory (Irish: Osraighe Uachtarach) was an administrative barony in the south and west of Queen's County (now County Laois) in Ireland. In late Gaelic Ireland it was the túath of the Mac Giolla Phádraig (Fitzpatrick) family and a surviving remnant of the once larger kingdom of Ossory. The northernmost part of the Diocese of Ossory and medieval County Kilkenny, it was transferred to the newly created Queen's County, now known as County Laois, in 1600. In the 1840s its three component cantreds, Clarmallagh, Clandonagh, and Upperwoods, were promoted to barony status, thereby superseding Upper Ossory.

== History ==
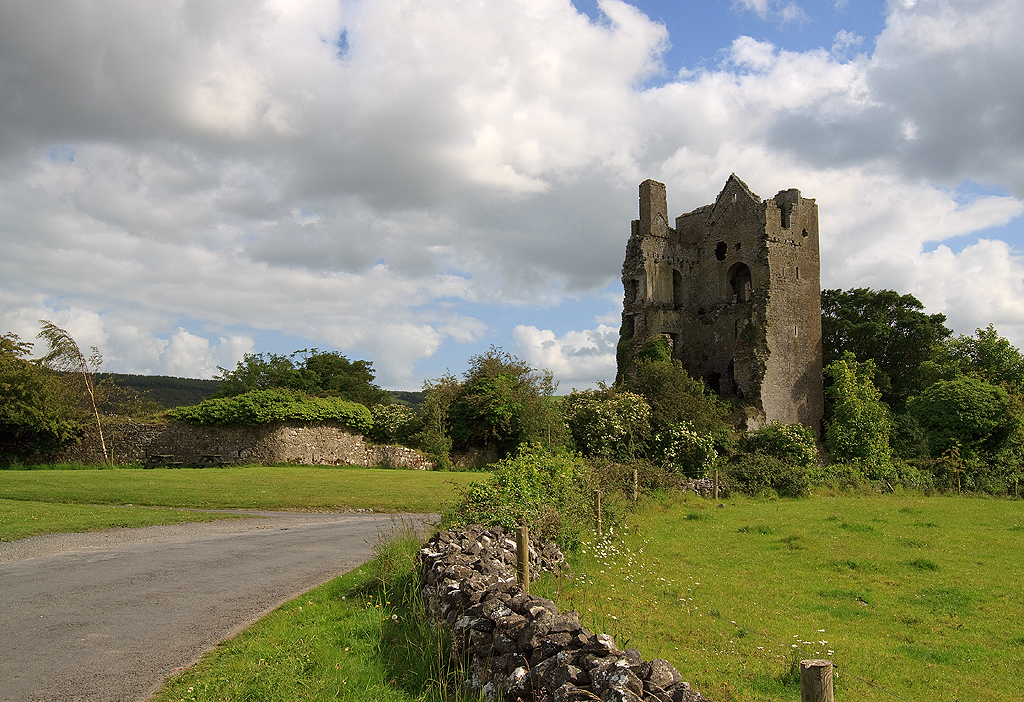
Cullahill Castle; once the most formidable five-story stronghold of the Fitzpatricks. It fell to Cromwellian guns by 1650.

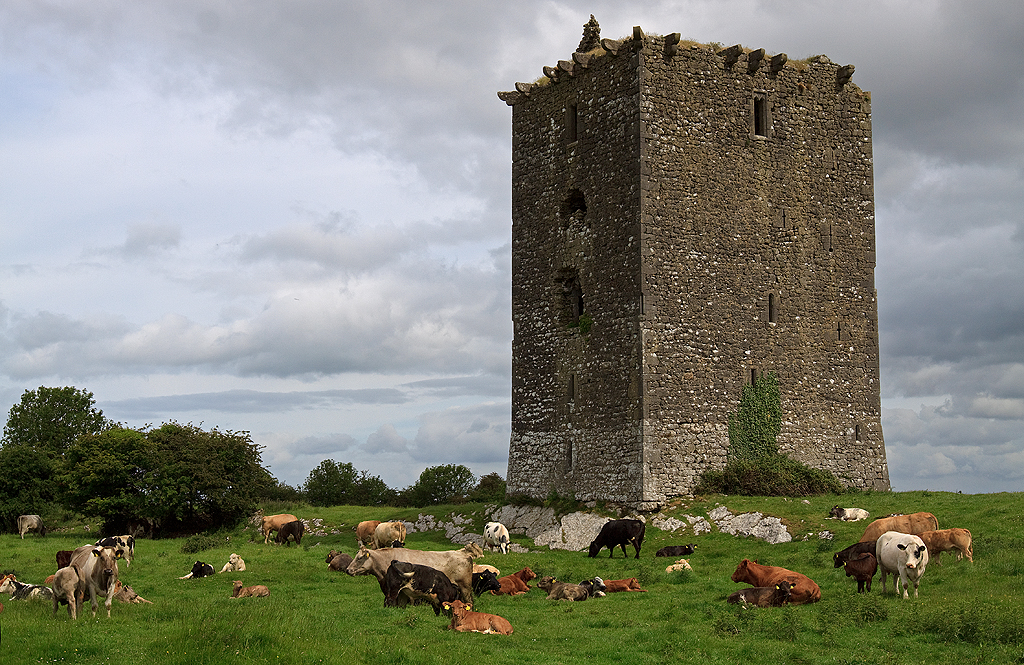
Cloburren Castle, once home to Teige Fitzpatrick, 4th Baron Upper Ossory.

County Kilkenny was created after the Norman invasion of Ireland from most of the Gaelic Kingdom of Ossory. Kilkenny's medieval cantred of Aghaboe, whose territory was the rural deanery of Aghaboe, corresponded approximately to the later Upper Ossory. From 1328, the Anglo-Norman Butler Earl of Ormond had palatine jurisdiction over the neighbouring county of Tipperary, and in the 15th century, the Butlers extended this de facto to most of Kilkenny. This was reflected in the subsidiary title Earl of Ossory which Piers Butler, 8th Earl of Ormond was granted in 1538. However, in the 14th and 15th centuries, the Gaelic Fitzpatrick family (Irish: Mac Giolla Phádraig) encroached southwards into Kilkenny and ruled as "Lords of Upper Ossory". In 1442, the Irish Treasury and Exchequer were petitioned to award 100 shillings to the Norman-affiliated inhabitants of the town of Kilkenny, for their military service against the neighbouring Gaels and "especially in breaching the castle of McKilpatrick [sic]".

In 1541, during the Tudor reconquest of Ireland, Barnaby Fitzpatrick (Brían Óg Mac Giolla Phádraig) was created 1st Baron Upper Ossory upon the surrender and regrant of his lands to and by Henry VIII, legitimating his lordship in the eyes of the Dublin Castle administration. Queen's County was created in 1556 from unshired lands northeast of Upper Ossory. In 1575, Henry Sidney, then Lord Deputy of Ireland, wrote "Upper Osserie is so well governed and defended, by the valor and wisedome of the Baron that nowe is as ... it made no matter, if the countrie were never shired, ... and yet united to some shire it shal be". Fitzpatrick preferred to be subject to the new English planters in Queen's County rather than his Ormond enemies in Kilkenny. By letters patent of 21 July 1600 Upper Ossory was formally transferred to Queen's County.

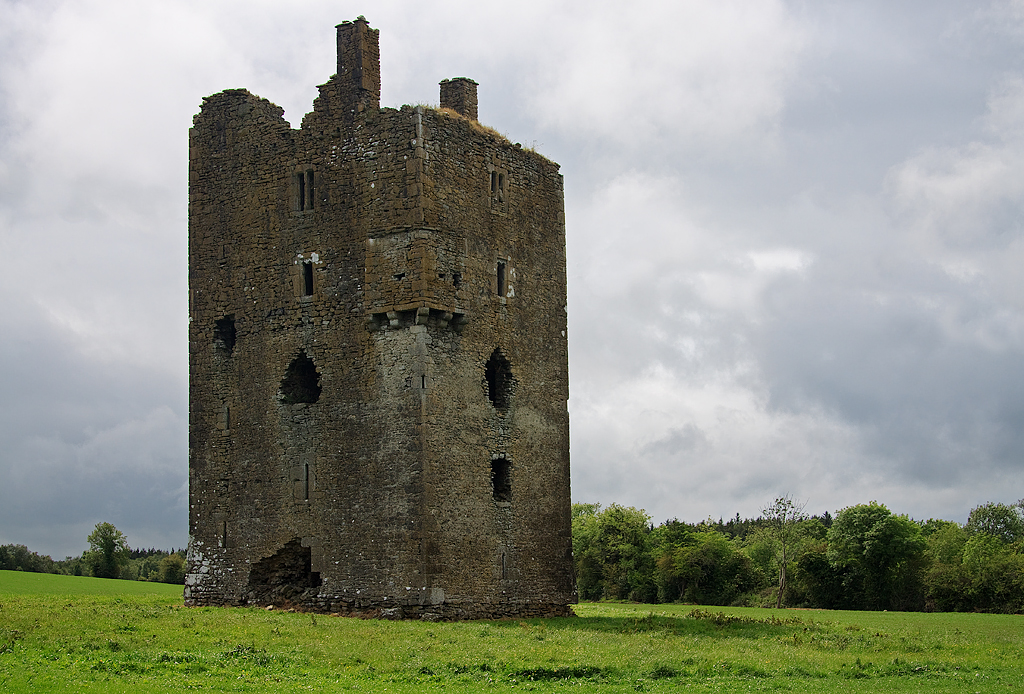
Ballagharrahin (Ballagh Castle) is a 15th-century five-story towerhouse in Rathdowny parish, Co. Laois used by the Fitzpatricks.

An exception was made for an area around Durrow, which remained an exclave of the Kilkenny barony of Galmoy. This was at the behest of the Earl of Ormond, who was lord of the manor of Durrow, and wanted to have Fitzpatrick raiders tried at the assizes of Kilkenny, where he could ensure a conviction.

After Arthur Chichester was made Lord Deputy in 1605, the lordship of the Fitzpatricks effectively ended. A 1621 inquisition in Maryborough (now Portlaoise) ruled that the king, James I, was lord of Upper Ossory, and he proceeded to grant George Villiers, 1st Duke of Buckingham extensive lands in the barony. As late as 1639, a statute refers to "upper Ossory, alias Mac Gil Patricks country".

== Supersession ==
Upper Ossory comprised one third of the territory of Queen's County. From the time of the Down Survey it was for many purposes divided into three subunits called cantreds; namely Clarmallagh, Clandonagh, and Upperwoods. The Ordnance Survey of Ireland's first edition maps of 1836–42 regarded these as baronies superseding Upper Ossory, as did the 1841 census. The Valuation of Lands (Ireland) Act 1836 empowered the grand jury of a county to subdivide large baronies. Whereas an order in council of 22 December 1841 refers to "that part of the barony of Upper Ossory, in the Queen's County, which is commonly called the Cantred of Clarmallagh, and which, according to the ordnance survey, is named the barony of Clarmallagh", another order in council of 9 February 1842 refers simply to "the barony of Clarmallagh". The 1846 Parliamentary Gazetteer recorded Upper Ossory as having been "a few years ago practically abolished".

The Redistribution of Seats Act 1885 split the two-seat constituency of Queen's County into two single-seat constituencies, one of which was to be called "Upper Ossory division"; this was changed to "Ossory division" at the committee stage by Richard Lalor, who said "there were both an Upper and a Lower Ossory at one time, but there was no distinction between the two now". The constituency comprised not just the former Upper Ossory but also Maryborough West, Tinnahinch, and part of Portnahinch.

The name of the town of Borris-in-Ossory recalls its location in Upper Ossory.

== Eponymous peerages ==
Several peerages with titles including "Upper Ossory" have been created, all held by members of the Fitzpatrick family:

Title	Peerage of	First	Created	Last	Extinct	Notes
Baron Upper Ossory	Ireland	Barnaby	1541	Barnaby (7th)	1791	Attainted 1691, died 1696.
Earl of Upper Ossory	Ireland	John	1751	John (2nd)	1818	Previously Baron Gowran
Baron Upper Ossory, of Ampthill in the County of Bedford	Great Britain	John	1794	John (1st)	1818	The 2nd Irish Earl was the first and only British Baron.
Baron Castletown, of Upper Ossory in the Queen's County	United Kingdom	John (Wilson)	1869	Bernard (2nd)	1937	John Wilson assumed the surname of his father, the second Earl, upon legitimation. Castletown is a village in Upperwoods, Upper Ossory.

== See also ==
- Ballaghmore
- Cullahill Castle
- Kingdom of Ossory
- List of baronies of Ireland
