= Alex Tizon =

Filipino-American journalist (1959–2017)

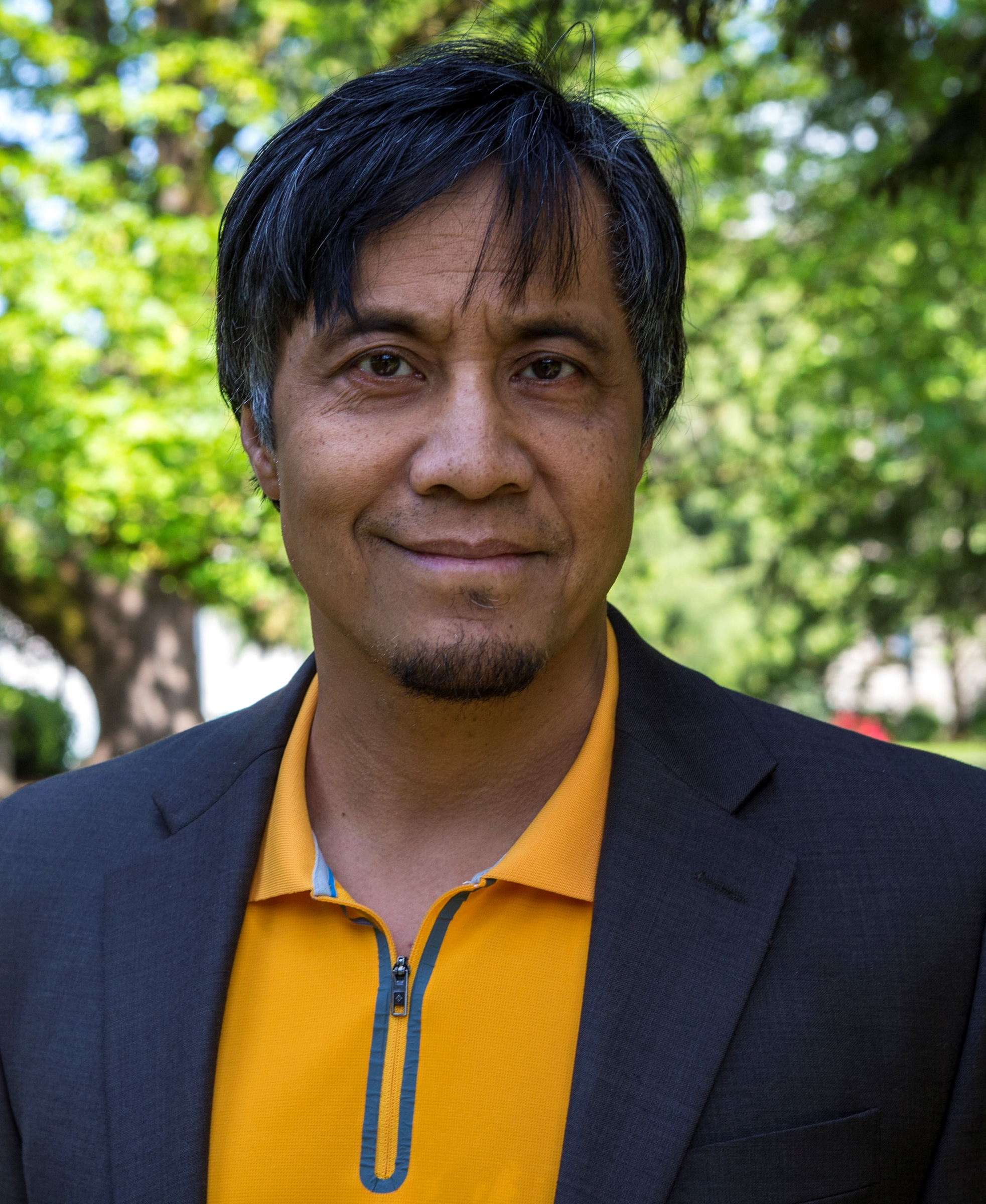
- Born: Tomas Alexander Asuncion Tizon; October 30, 1959; Manila, Philippines
- Died: March 23, 2017 (aged 57); Eugene, Oregon, U.S.
- Citizenship: United States and Philippines
- Education: University of Oregon; Stanford University
- Occupations: Author, professor (University of Oregon)
- Writing career
- Notable works: Big Little Man; My Family's Slave
- Notable awards: Anthony J. Lukas Book Prize, 2011; International Journalism Fellowship, 2009; Knight I Jefferson Fellowship, 1998; Pulitzer Prize in Investigative Journalism, 1997
- Website: alextizon.com (archived from December 2016)

Tomas Alexander Asuncion Tizon (October 30, 1959 – March 23, 2017) was a Filipino-American author and Pulitzer Prize-winning journalist. His book Big Little Man, a memoir and cultural history, explores themes related to race, masculinity, and personal identity. Tizon taught at the University of Oregon School of Journalism and Communication. His final story, titled "My Family's Slave", was published as the cover story of the June 2017 issue of The Atlantic after his death, sparking significant debate.

== Early life ==
Tizon was born Tomas Alexander Asuncion Tizon in Manila, Philippines on October 30, 1959, the second of five children. He immigrated with his family in 1964, shortly before the first big wave of Asian immigration to the United States in the postwar era. His childhood was marked by financial hardship and frequent long-distance moves. Through twelve grades, he attended eight schools from Honolulu to New York City. He earned degrees from the University of Oregon and Stanford University.

== Career ==
As a reporter for The Seattle Times, he and two colleagues won the 1997 Pulitzer Prize for Investigative Reporting for a five-part series about fraud and mismanagement in the Federal Indian Housing Program.

After the 9/11 terrorist attacks, Tizon and photographer Alan Berner drove from Seattle to Ground Zero in New York City, chronicling their journey with a multi-part series called "Crossing America – Dispatches From a New Nation," which explored the changes brought about by the attacks. In 2002, he and Berner made another trip to Ground Zero, this time taking a southern route, and produced the series, "Crossing America – One Year Later."

Tizon was Seattle Bureau Chief for the Los Angeles Times from 2003 to 2008. He was a Knight International Journalism Fellow based in Manila in 2009 and 2010.

Towards the end of his life, he wrote a piece in The Atlantic about Eudocia Tomas Pulido, a Filipina peasant woman and distant relative who was his family's lifelong indentured servant, and as he argued, in effect their slave. Pulido helped to raise Tizon's mother and all of her children and Tizon's daughters without compensation for decades, until Tizon took her in after his mother's death. The story was the last Tizon would write before he died.

=== Big Little Man ===
He expanded upon his journalistic themes—exiles, immigrants, social outcasts, people searching for identity or purpose—in a personal way in his book Big Little Man: In Search of My Asian Self. Tizon told his own story as a first-generation immigrant and an Asian male growing up in the United States to examine cultural mythologies related to race and gender, in particular the Western stereotypes of Asian men and women. The book won the 2011 J. Anthony Lukas Book Prize Work-In-Progress Award, sponsored by Columbia University and the Nieman Foundation at Harvard.

== Personal life ==
Tizon was married twice. He had a daughter, Dylan, from his first marriage. He later married Melissa Tizon. The couple had a daughter, Maya.

Tizon was found dead in his home in Eugene, Oregon, on March 23, 2017. A medical examiner later found that Tizon had died in his sleep of natural causes. The same day, The Atlantic's editorial staff decided the article would be featured on the magazine's front cover, but Tizon died before they could tell him of their decision.
