= Teige Fitzpatrick, 4th Baron Upper Ossory =

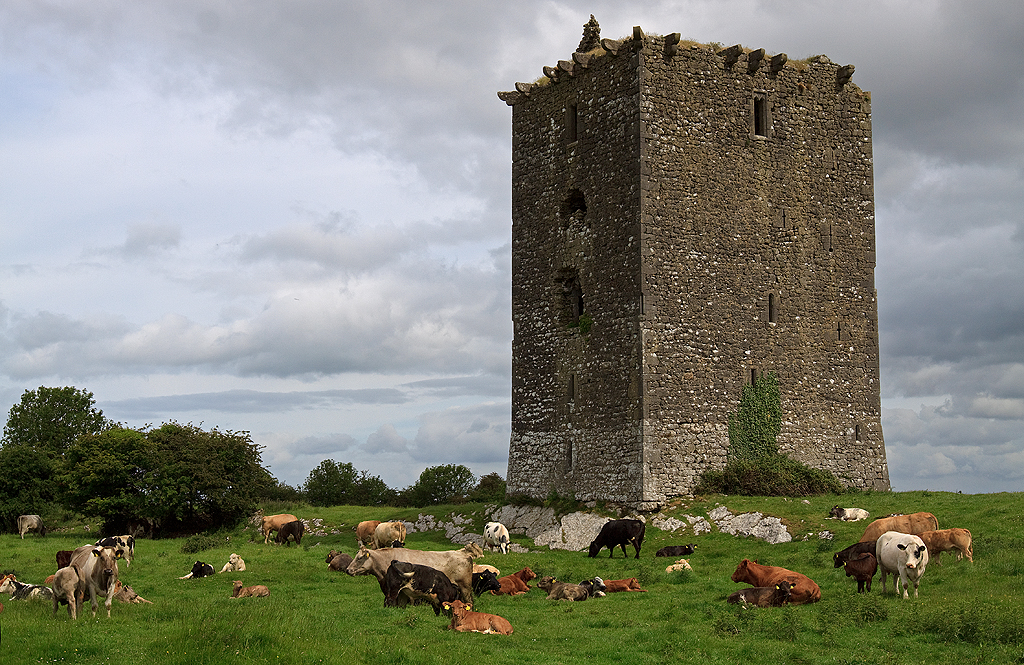
Cloburren Castle, once home to Teige Fitzpatrick, 4th Baron Upper Ossory, was one of many tower houses in the region.

Teige Fitzpatrick, 4th Baron Upper Ossory (also known as Thady Fitzpatrick)(d. December 1627) was the son and heir of Florence Fitzpatrick, 3rd Baron Upper Ossory, by his wife Catherine O'More. He married Joan Butler, the daughter of Sir Edmund Butler of Cloughgrenan.

By her, he had issue:

- Brian, a.k.a. Barnaby Fitzpatrick, 5th Baron Upper Ossory, his successor.
- Dermot, a.k.a. Darby, who was twice married: firstly, Ellinor Comerford (daughter of Richard Comerford, Esq.), widow of John Kennedy, Esq.; and secondly, Ellen Shortall (daughter of Nicholas Shortall, Esq.). He and his son, Dermot Oge, were killed in a battle against English troops at Borris-in-Ossory in 1642.
- Turlough, who married Onora Grace (daughter of Oliver Grace, Esq.).
- John
- Margaret, married to Thomas Hovenden of Tankardstown Castle, Queen's Co.
- Catherine, married to Callaghan Fitzgerald of Cloghkyle, Queen's Co.
- Onora
- Joan, married to William Butler, Esq., of Lynon, Co. Tipperary.

Teige Fitzpatrick died in December 1627 and rests at Aghamacart. His Lady Joan died in late 1631. Her will indicates a granddaughter named "Uny ny Donel" ("Una daughter of Donnell"), thereby indicating that Teige may have had another son, Donnell, who was omitted from the pedigree. Alternately, this could be a granddaughter through one of their daughters.

== Notes ==
Peerage of Ireland
Preceded by Florence Fitzpatrick	Baron Upper Ossory; 1619–1627	Succeeded by Barnaby Fitzpatrick
