= Barnaby Fitzpatrick, 1st Baron Upper Ossory =

Irish baron (died 1575)

Sir Brian Mac Giolla Phádraig/Barnaby Fitzpatrick

1st Baron Upper Ossory
- In office 1541–1575

Personal details
- Spouse(s): (1) unknown Ó Mórdha, (2) unknown first cousin, (3) Catherine Ó Mórdha, (4) Maragret Butler, (5) Elizabeth O'Connor
- Children: numerous, including Barnaby Fitzpatrick, 2nd Baron Upper Ossory, Florence Fitzpatrick, 3rd Baron Upper Ossory

Barnaby Fitzpatrick (born Irish: Brían Mac Giolla Phádraig) (c.1478–1575) was the last person to have claim to the kingship of Osraige; forfeiting his ancestral title in favour of being created the first Baron Upper Ossory by King Henry VIII, by patent dated 11 June 1541, as part of the King's policy of Surrender and regrant. Barnaby Fitzpatrick was subsequently knighted on 1 July 1543.

== Biography ==
Brían, finding his brother Diarmaid an embarrassment and a hindrance to his ambitions of becoming an English Baron, gave up his brother to the Butlers and the Butlers acted out their cruel revenge on him. That being done, Brían, in 1537, submitted to the English king and gave up all his ancient rights. So in 1541, Brían became Barnaby Fitzpatrick, the First Baron of Upper Ossory at Castletown.

He was afterwards imprisoned at Waterford until he restored "some preys he had seized in Leix".

== Family ==
First, about 1491 he married an unknown daughter of Ó Mórdha, who was his first cousin; she died, probably in childbirth.

Second, about 1492 he married an unknown first cousin, who was also the first cousin of his first wife. Without dispensation from the church this second marriage was declared null.

Third, about 1493 he married Catherine Ó Mórdha, who was his half-sister and also the half-sister of his first wife. They had children, which resulted in an uproar among the relatives of the second wife. Nevertheless the Pope absolved the pair, permitted their marriage, and decreed their present and future children were legitimate. According to Carrigan Brian's children before his marriage to Margaret Butler probably included:

- Teige, who his father, Brian, had put to death.
- Katherine, who married Robert Grace.

Fourth, about 1532, he married Margaret Butler, widow of Richard Mór Burke and widow of Thomas FitzGerald (of Desmond), first daughter of Piers Butler, 8th Earl of Ormond. They had children:

- Barnaby (c. 1533–1581), his successor and second Baron, was invited to study in London with the boy-king Edward VI, who developed a deep affection for him. In his later years a severe rift developed between Brian and Barnaby, who was his eldest legitimate son.
- Florence, who succeeded to Upper Ossory on the death of his brother.
- Donnell, of Gortnaclea.
- Geoffrey, of Ballyawly.
- Grainne or Grizzel who was married to her first cousin, Edmund Butler, 2nd Viscount Mountgarret.

Fifth, about 1551 he married Elizabeth O'Connor. They had children:

- Turlough (slain by Dermot O'Malloy in 1581)
- Dermot (slain by Dermot O'Malloy in 1581)

According to Carrigan Brian also fathered:

- Shane, whose mother was Joan ny Carroll.
- Teighe, of Upperwoods living 1585
- Ceallagh, of Upperwoods in rebellion 1578
- Donogh, of Upperwoods, probably Brian's second son, whose descendants took the surname Mac Fynen or Mac Kynen (modern Keenan)

According to O'Hart Brian also fathered:

- David

In 2002, researchers Ronan Fitzpatrick and Steve Zalewski published a book containing a list of all known descendants of Barnaby Fitz-Patrick, 1st Baron Upper Ossory; revised edition published in 2013. – it is considered the list of descendants is incomplete.

== Notes ==
Peerage of Ireland
New creation	Baron Upper Ossory; 1541–1575	Succeeded by Barnaby Fitzpatrick
