= Tuilleadh feasa ar Éirinn óigh =

Medieval Irish text

Tuilleadh feasa ar Éirinn óigh ("More knowledge on the entirety of Ireland") is a medieval Gaelic-Irish topographical text, composed by Giolla na Naomh Ó hUidhrín (died 1420).

== Overview ==
Tuilleadh feasa ... is both a supplement and a continuation of Seán Mór Ó Dubhagáin's Triallam timcheall na Fodla. Of the two, James Carney wrote:

- "These two poems together constitute a compendium of the topography of pre-Norman Ireland, as seen, however, by poets who lived two centuries after the invasion. Triallam timcheall na Fodla ... is an account of the territories of the northern half of Ireland and Leinster, indicating the ruling family or families of each district. Tuilleadh feasa ar Éirinn óigh ... treats in similar fashion of the southern half of Ireland, including Leinster, of which we have therefore two independent accounts. The introductory stanzas of Ó hUidhrín's poem, in which he defines the scope of his work and its relation to that of his predecessor, may be summarised as follows: I shall tell you here of the noble kindreds of Ireland who have been omitted by Ó Dubhagáin. It is not through want of knowledge that he has not described Leinster, for he has treated of Conn's half only. To describe the southern half, Munster, Leinster, and the lands about the lower Shannon, falls within my province."

== See also ==
- Críchad an Chaoilli
- Crichaireacht cinedach nduchasa Muintiri Murchada
- Leabhar Adhamh Ó Cianáin
- O Doyne manuscript
