= Barnaby Fitzpatrick, 7th Baron Upper Ossory =

Barnaby Fitzpatrick (Irish: Brian Mac Giolla Phádraig), 7th Baron Upper Ossory, (d. 1696) was the eldest son, heir and successor of Barnaby Fitzpatrick, 6th Baron Upper Ossory by his wife Catherine Everard.

== Life ==
Barnaby Fitzpatrick the 7th Baron Upper Ossory married Margaret Butler, daughter of Pierce Butler, 1st Viscount Ikerrin. By her, he begot five children; four of whom tragically predeceased him:

- Brian, (also called Barnaby) who died unmarried of smallpox in 1687.
- Kieran, who died in childhood.
- John, who died in childhood.
- Catherine, who died in childhood.
- Mary, the "only and unfortunate", who was the only child mentioned in her father's will.

After Margaret's death, he remarried twice; first to another Margaret Butler, daughter and heiress to James Baron Dunboyne; and again to Dorothy Wagstaff. Neither his second or third marriages produced any offspring.

He was the last of the Barons of Upper Ossory to legally attain to the lordship. Because the 7th Baron Upper Ossory sided with James II against William of Orange, he was outlawed by Dublin in 1690. On 11 May 1691, the seventh baron was attainted and the barony forfeited. His nephew and successor, also named Barnaby Fitzpatrick (son of his brother John), commonly called the "8th Baron Upper Ossory", was disallowed from legally attaining the lordship of Upper Ossory on account of his uncle's automatic forfeiture.

In 1699, two other relatives, Richard and James Fitzpatrick, petitioned the King to be allowed to inherit the Ossory estates, provided that a pension be paid to Dorothy, the last Lady Ossory.

== Notes ==
Peerage of Ireland
| Preceded by Barnaby Fitzpatrick | Baron Upper Ossory; 1666–1696 | Forfeit |
