= Giolla na Naomh Ó hUidhrín =

Irish historian and poet

Giolla na Naomh O hUidhrin, Irish historian and poet, died 1420.

O hUidhrin is known as the author of Tuilleadh feasa ar Éirinn óigh, a topographical poem of a kind with Seán Mór Ó Dubhagáin's Triallam timcheall na Fodla, of which it is a supplement.

Although his obit is noted in all the main Irish annals, indicating he was regarded as a noteworthy man, nothing further is known of him.
