= Aghaboe (disambiguation) =

Aghaboe can refer to

- Aghaboe, a hamlet in County Laois
- Abbey of Aghaboe, a ruin in the above hamlet
- Aghaboe (defunct Church of Ireland parish), County Laois
- Aghaboe (civil parish), a civil parish which was derived from the above, defunct, Church of Ireland parish
- St. Canice, Aghaboe, the parish church of the above defunct Church of Ireland parish, which still exists in the above hamlet
- Aghaboe (townland), a townland in the above civil parish
- Aghaboe (Catholic parish), which is much larger than the above civil parish and which, like it, has its origins in the ministry associated with the Abbey of Aghaboe
