= Aghaboe (Catholic parish) =

Aghaboe is a Roman Catholic parish in County Laois. It is one of the parishes of the Roman Catholic Diocese of Ossory.

The parish is named after Aghaboe abbey which was founded in the 6th century by St. Canice and whose ruins are still visible in the hamlet of Aghaboe.

== Extent ==
In his 1837 Topographical Dictionary of Ireland, Lewis, when describing the civil parish of Aghaboe, wrote that the Catholic parish of Aghaboe comprised, as well as the civil parish of the same name, the civil parishes of Killermagh (Kylermough) and Bordwell and parts of the civil parishes of Kildellig (Kyledellig) and Coolkerry.

According to Carrigan, in his 1905 history of the Roman Catholic Diocese of Ossory, the Catholic parish comprised 19,610 acres at that time, having been reduced in area in 1855, when that part of the civil parish of Aghaboe which was situated in the Barony of Clandonnagh was removed—it was added to 100 acres of Kyledellig (presumably that part of Kildellig which, according to Lewis, was not part of the Catholic parish in 1837) to form the new Catholic parish of Borris-in-Ossary. Carrigan also said that the part of the civil parish of Coolkerry which was in the Catholic parish of Aghaboe was the townlands of Middlemount and Coolacurragh.

== Churches ==
In his 1837 Topographical Dictionary of Ireland, Lewis said that the Catholic parish of Aghaboe had four chapels, three of which were in the civil parish of Aghaboe, at Knockrea, Ballincolla, and Burros-in-Ossory.

In 2012, there are two Catholic churches in the parish:

- Immaculate Conception, in Ballacolla
- St Canice, in Clough

== Sports clubs ==
Clough/Ballacolla GAA is one of the sports clubs based in the parish.
