= R434 road (Ireland) =

Road in Ireland

R434 road
- Bóthar R434
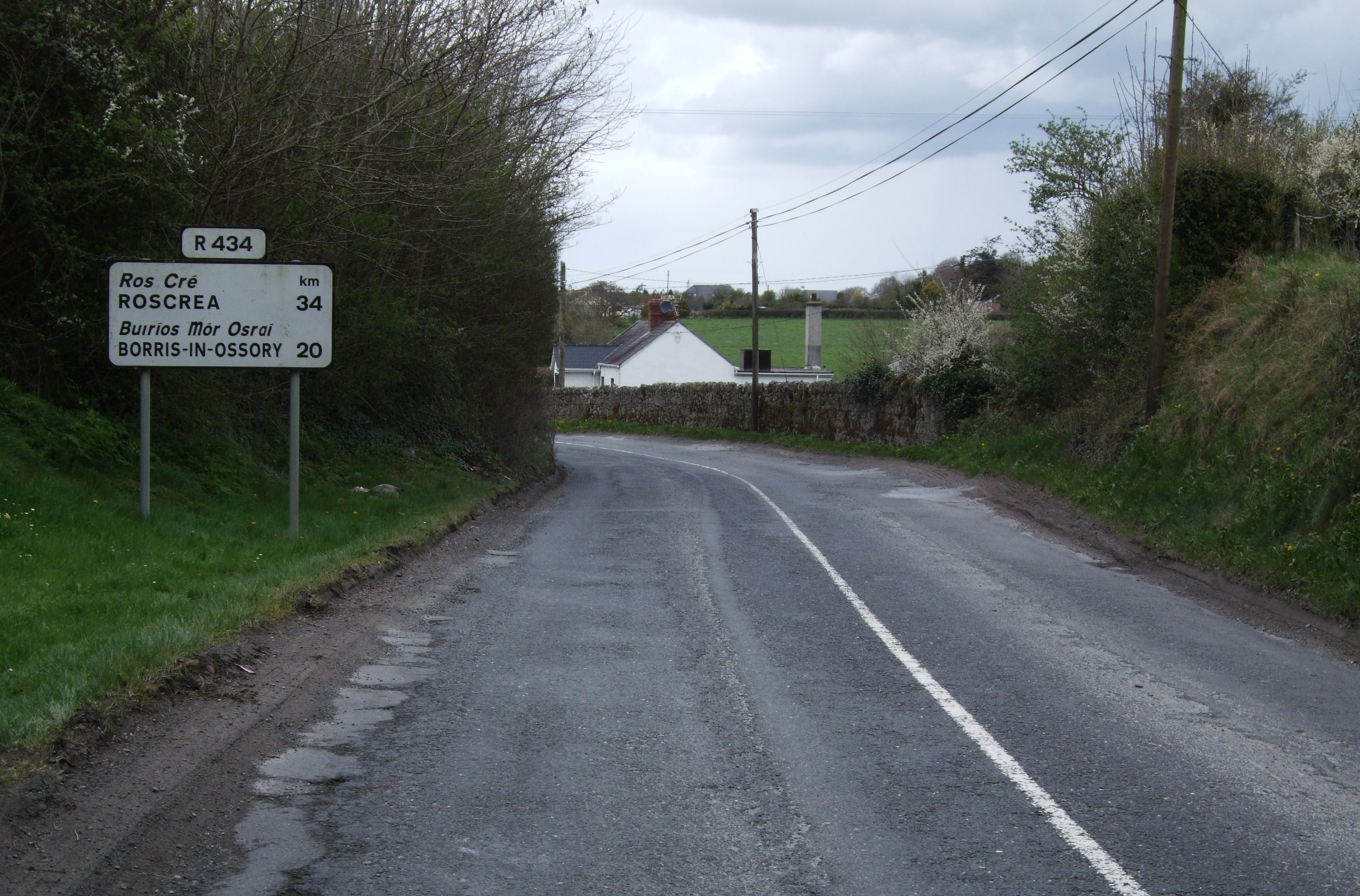
- R434 west of Durrow

Route information
- Length: 20 km (12 mi)

Location
- Country: Ireland
- Primary destinations: County Laois; Crosses the Dublin-Cork railway line; Donaghmore – crosses the River Erkina; Aghaboe; Bridge over the M7 motorway; Bridge over the M8 motorway; Ballycolla – (R433); Rathdowney – leaves the R433; Durrow – Terminates at the N77

Highway system
- Roads in Ireland; Motorways; Primary; Secondary; Regional

The R434 road is a regional road in Ireland linking Borris-in-Ossory on the R445 to Durrow on the N77. En route it passes through Aghaboe and Ballycolla, and over both the M7 and M8 motorways. The entire route is within County Laois.

The R434 was the former Trunk Road, T48. The road is 20 km (12 mi) long.

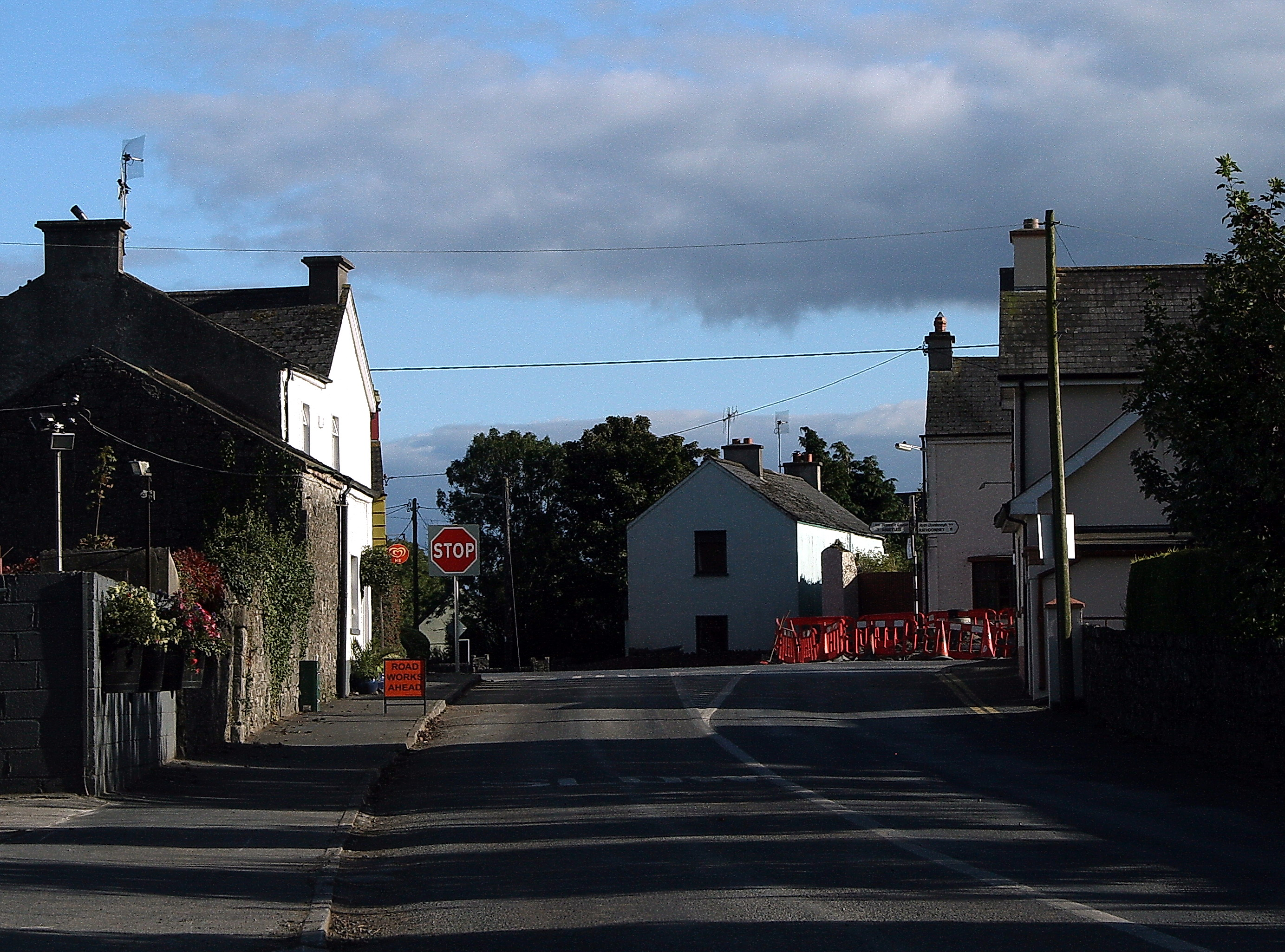
R434 through Ballycolla at its junction with the R433

== See also ==
- Roads in Ireland
- National primary road
- National secondary road
