= Coolkerry =

Civil parish in County Laois, Ireland

Coordinates: 52.855°N 7.557°W

Coolkerry (Irish: Cúil Chéire, Ceir's nook) is a civil parish in the barony of Clarmallagh in County Laois. It is separated into two disjoint areas by an arm of Aghaboe civil parish.

== Political geography ==
Coolkery has six townlands. The townland of Coolkerry, along with the townlands of Coolnaboul East (a tiny area of only 4 acres, 2 roods and 12 perches), Graigueanossy and Turfarney are in the main, western, part of the civil parish, while the townlands of Coolacurragh and Middlemount (which is also known as Ballyvoghlaun) are in the eastern exclave of the parish.

The political geography of the parish is further complicated by the fact that it is divided between two baronies. Coolnaboul East is in the barony of Clandonagh while the rest of the parish is in the barony of Clarmallagh.

== Population ==
At the time of the 1861 census, there was nobody living in Coolnaboul East but the rest of the parish had a population of 260.

== History ==
Coolkerry parish was established in the early 13th century, when it was patronised by the builders of Norman strongholds such as the nearby Coolkerry Castle. The Norman patrons allocated the tithes of the parish to St Thomas's Abbey in Dublin, a house of the Canons Regular.

The ruins of Coolkerry Church are in a graveyard near the south-western corner of Coolkerry townland. The church is on a rise overlooking the River Erkina. Only the remains of the west gable are still standing, with just grassy banks in the place of the remaining walls of the church which was about 17 metres long and 7.3 metres wide. The church has been in ruins since at least the middle of the 17th century, the Down Survey marking the site as having a "ruined church, weir and cabin".

The church was located near a ford where the River Erkina was crossed by an ancient road that ran from western Upper Ossory to Kilkenny. A system of toghers skirted Rathdowney (a few miles west of Coolkerry) and then turned southwards to cross the Erkina at several places. One of these continued to Gorteen and, crossing the River Goul near Newtown Nunnery, continued to Aharney Church.

There are no visible remains of Coolkerry Castle which was built close to the site of the church, although its ruins are shown on the mid-19th century Ordnance Survey map.

Less than 1 km (0.62 mi) to the south-west of Coolkerry Castle, in the neighbouring townland of Rathpiper South, is the site of another castle which is believed to have been built by Pipard, a descendant of Adam de Hereford, the first Norman to colonise this part of County Laois. Both castles were associated with the weir on the River Erkina just by the site of Coolkerry Church.
