= R435 road (Ireland) =

Road in Ireland

R435 road
- Bóthar R435
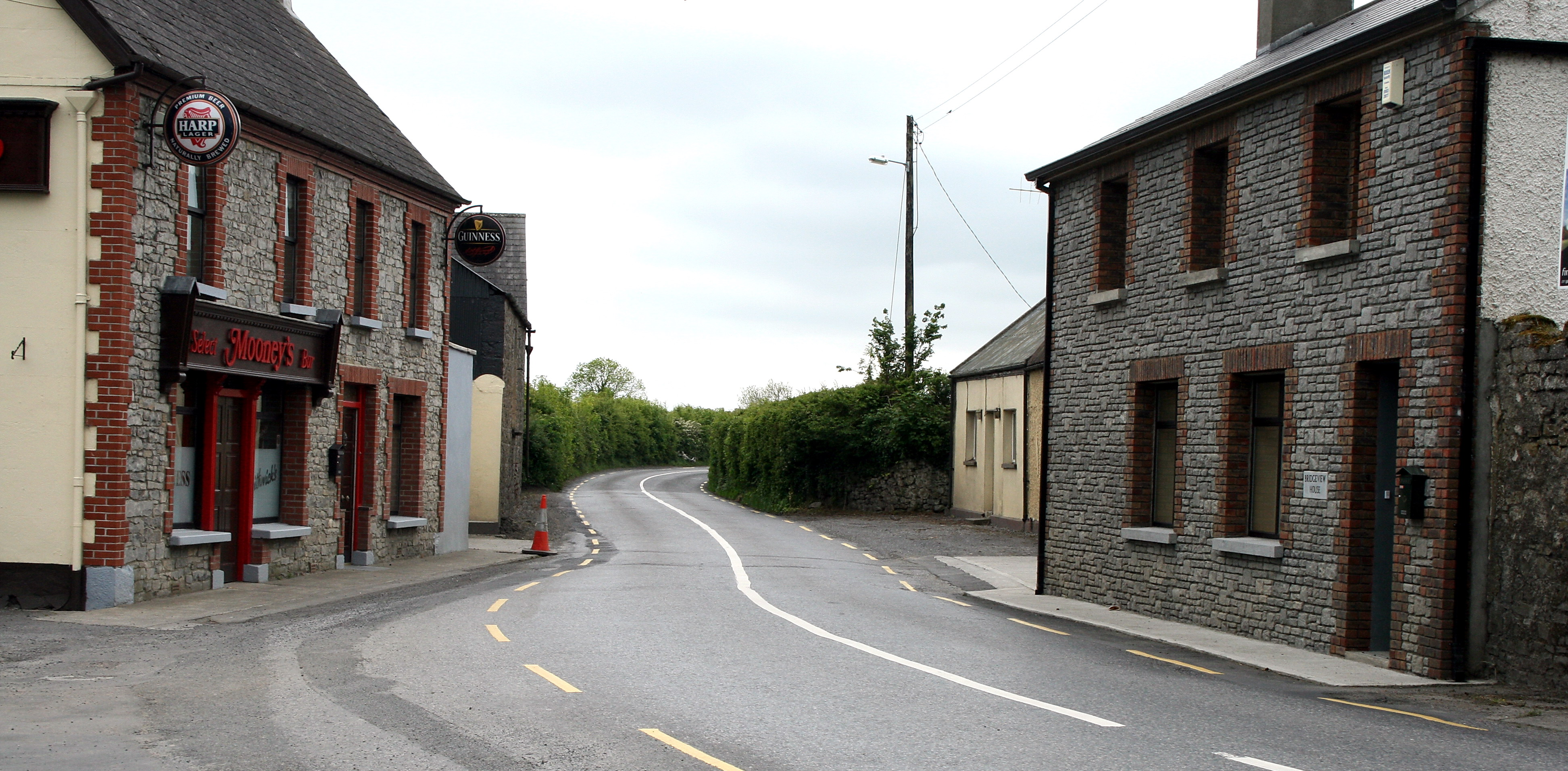
- R435 through Donaghmore, County Laois

Route information
- Length: 28 km (17 mi)

Location
- Country: Ireland
- Primary destinations: County Laois; Borris-in-Ossory leaves the R445; Ballybrophy; Crosses the Dublin-Cork railway line; Donaghmore – crosses the River Erkina; Joins the R433; Rathdowney – leaves the R433; County Kilkenny; Johnstown – (R502); R639; Terminates at the R693

Highway system
- Roads in Ireland; Motorways; Primary; Secondary; Regional

The R435 road is a regional road in Ireland linking Borris-in-Ossory, County Laois to the R693 south of Johnstown, County Kilkenny. It passes through the town of Rathdowney County Laois en route. It joins the M7 motorway at junction 21, 1km south of Borris-in-Ossory. The road is 28 km (17 mi) long.

== See also ==
- Roads in Ireland
- National primary road
- National secondary road
