= Coolkerry (townland) =

Townland in County Laois, Ireland

Coolkerry (Irish: Cúil Chéire, Ceir's nook) is a townland in Coolkerry civil parish in County Laois.

The ruins of Coolkerry Church (the parish of this name was established in the early 13th century) are in a graveyard near the south-western corner of the townland, as are the ruins of Coolkerry Castle.

The church is on a rise overlooking the River Erkina. Only the remains of the west gable are still standing, with just grassy banks in the place of the remaining walls of the church which was about 17 metres long and 7.3 metres wide. The church has been in ruins since at least the middle of the 17th century, the Down Survey marking the site as having a "ruined church, weir and cabin".

There are no visible remains of the castle which was built close to the site of the church, although its ruins are shown on the mid-19th century Ordnance Survey map.
