= Donaghmore, County Laois =

Village in County Laois, Ireland

Donaghmore An Domhnach Mór
- Village
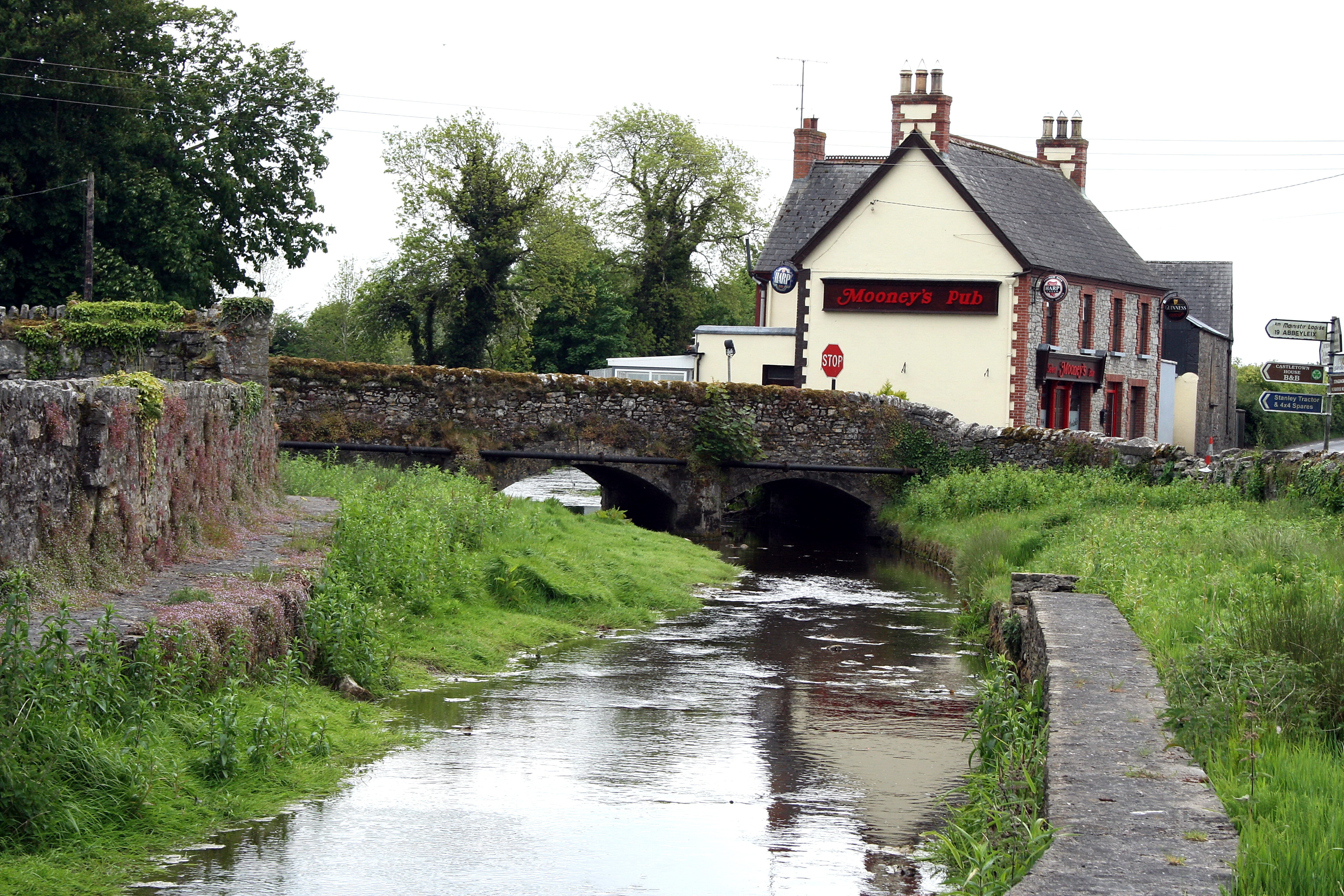
- Donaghmore on the River Erkina

- Location in Ireland
- Coordinates: 52°52′21″N 7°36′00″W
- Country: Ireland
- Province: Leinster
- County: County Laois

Area
  - Total: 1.44 km^{2} (0.56 sq mi)
- Elevation: 1 m (3.3 ft)
- Time zone: UTC+0 (WET)
  - Summer (DST): UTC-1 (IST (WEST))

Donaghmore (Irish: An Domhnach Mór, meaning 'big church') is a small village in County Laois, Ireland. It is in a townland and civil parish of the same name.

It is located in the south of the county near Rathdowney on the main R435 regional road, on the River Erkina, a tributary of the Nore.

== Workhouse ==
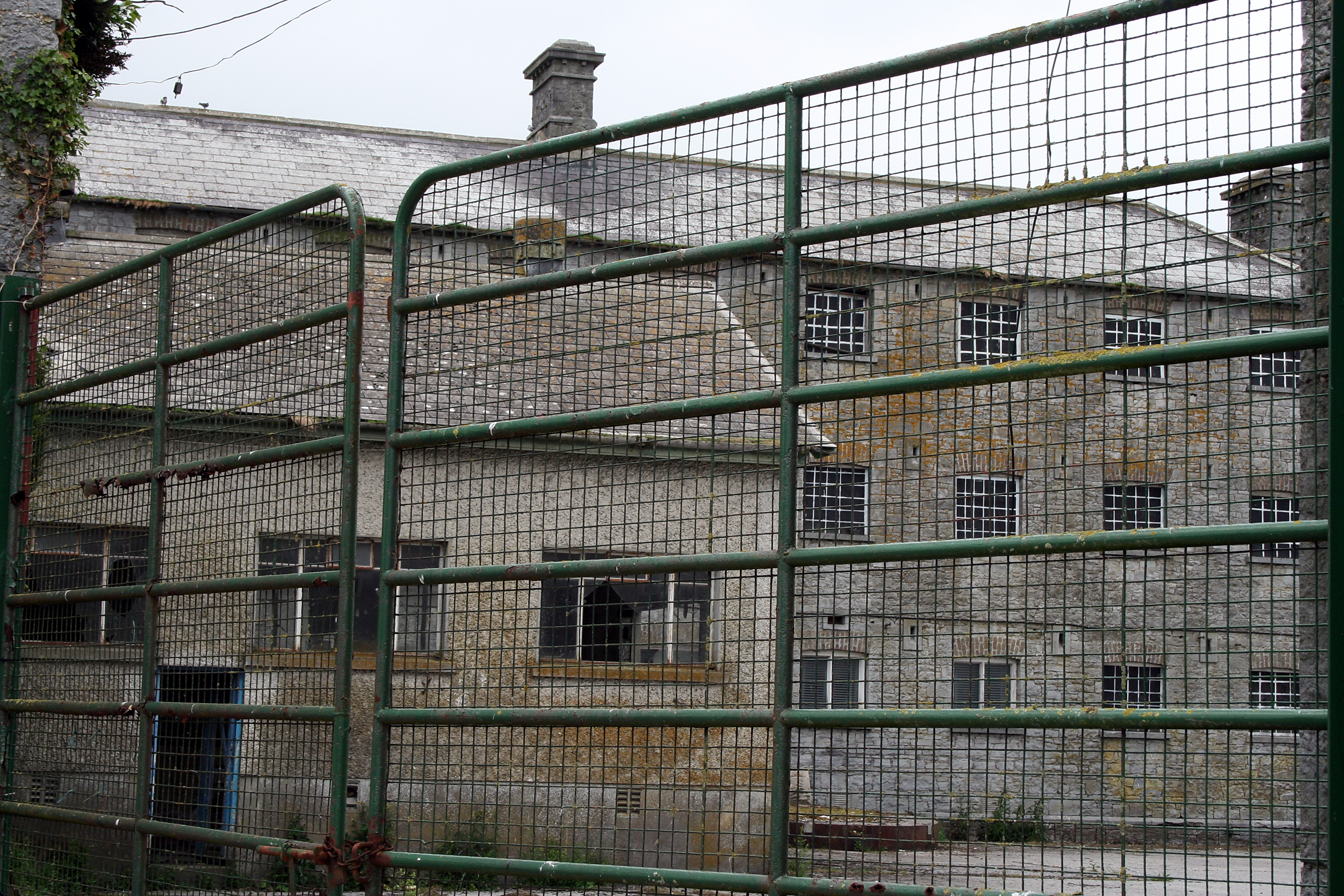
Donaghmore Workhouse

Located on the road between Borris-in-Ossory and Rathdowney, Donaghmore Workhouse was opened in 1853 to house the most impoverished and desperate people in this part of County Laois. Conditions were made as unattractive as possible, so that only those who had “lost all hope” would burden the taxpayer.

Once inside, the inmates had to give up their personal clothing and don the rough workhouse uniforms. Families were split up; males from females, children from their parents. The inmates were divided into seven different categories, including one for elderly men and women, one for able-bodied males older than 13 years, one for able-bodied females older than 16 years, one for boys (7 to 13), one for girls 7 to 16, and one for children under 7.

Once inside, the poor slept on mattresses of straw and rags; toilets were large tubs in the dormitories. Inmates worked during the day and then were fed. Meals were eaten in total silence. When Donaghmore Workhouse opened most of the poor of the County had already perished from starvation or had emigrated. The Workhouse was likely only full for a few years prior to its closure in 1886.

The buildings were abandoned until 1920, when they were briefly used to billet a unit of Black and Tans during the Irish War of Independence. In 1927 it was used by the local agricultural cooperative for milk processing, eventually being acquired by the Glanbia food and marketing group. In 1988, Glanbia made some of the buildings available to a local committee for the purpose of developing a Famine and Agriculture museum. While local volunteers are the driving force behind the new museum, support has been received from the local development agency.

== See also ==
- List of towns and villages in Ireland
