= Chapelhill (townland) =

Townland in County Laois, Ireland

Coordinates: 52.8842°N 7.5085°W

Chapelhill is a townland in County Laois in Ireland. A small part of it, comprising a little over three acres, is in the civil parish of Aghaboe but most of it (a little over 104 acres) lies in the civil parish of Bordwell. The village of Clough lies in this latter part of the townland.
