= Castleiney =

Castleleiny Caisleán Laighnigh
- Village
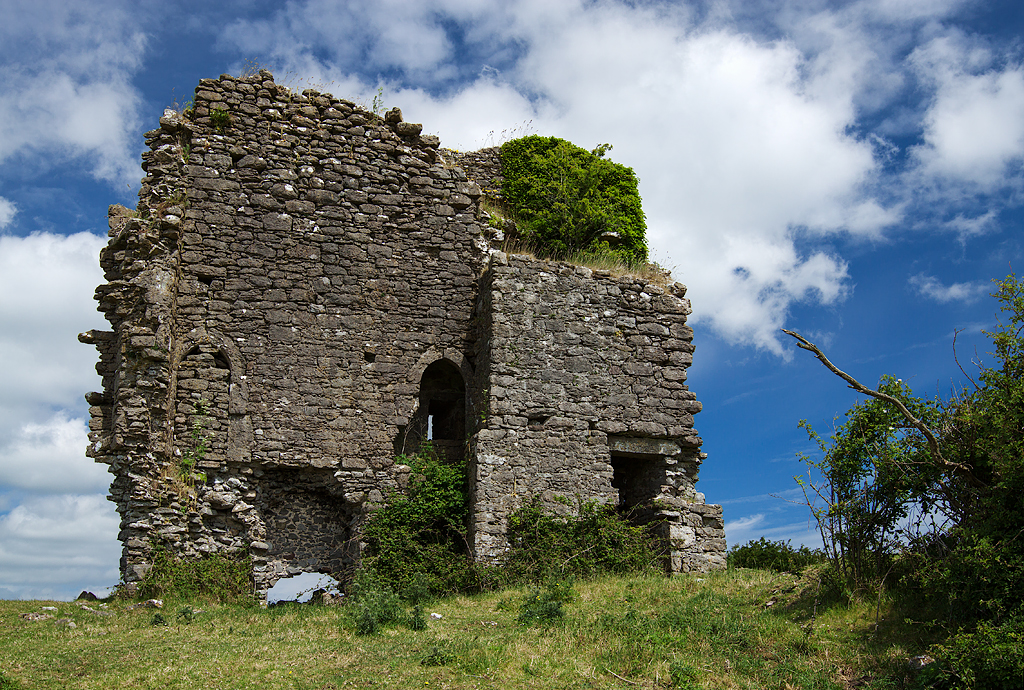
- Ruins of Castle Leiny, from which the village takes its name

- Location in Ireland
- Coordinates: 52°47′10″N 7°47′22″W
- Country: Ireland
- Province: Munster
- County: County Tipperary
- Time zone: UTC+0 (WET)
  - Summer (DST): UTC-1 (IST (WEST))

Castleiney, officially Castleleiny (Irish: Caisleán Laighnigh), is a village in County Tipperary, Ireland. It is one half of the Roman Catholic parish of Loughmore-Castleiney. It lies within the barony of Eliogarty and is approximately 5 km from Templemore and 7 km from Loughmore. The village is connected to Templemore via the R433, R502 and L3205 roads.

== History and name ==
The village and townland of Castleiney, officially Castleleiny and historically "Castlelyny", derives from the Irish Caisleán Laighnigh or "castle of Laighnigh". In Irish Names of Places (published in 1913), Patrick Weston Joyce suggests that this refers to the "castle of the Lynagh or Leinsterman".

Evidence of ancient settlement in the area includes a number of ringfort and enclosure sites in the townlands of Castleleiny, Ballinroe, Gorteendangan and Gorteenmagher. The "castle" at Castleleiny townland is described in the Record of Monuments and Places as a "late sixteenth/early seventeenth-century fortified house [..] fortified with a bawn wall". The village's Catholic church is dedicated to Saint John the Baptist and was completed c. 1830.

A section of the River Iney, which passes through the village, is sometimes known locally as "the washpen". According to an adjacent stone sign, the name derives from a former practice in which farmers would construct a pen (enclosure) in the area to wash their sheep prior to shearing.

Replacing an earlier school, Castleiney's current national (primary) school building dates from the 1940s and was renovated and extended in 2008.

== Sport ==
The local Gaelic Athletic Association (GAA) club is Loughmore–Castleiney GAA. The club has won a number of county titles in hurling and Gaelic football, winning both the Tipperary Senior Hurling Championship and Senior Football Championship "double" in 2021.

== Notable people ==
- Martin Stanislaus Brennan (1845–1927), an American Catholic priest and scientist known for writing books about religion and science, was born in the area.
- John Martin Hayes (1887–1957), Catholic priest and founder of Muintir na Tíre, was parish priest in the area in the 1920s.

== See also ==
- List of towns and villages in Ireland
