= St Canice's Church =

St Canice's Church, St. Canice's Church or other variations may refer to:

- St. Canice's Church, Finglas (Church of Ireland), Dublin, Ireland
- St Canice's Church, Westport, New Zealand
- St. Canice, Aghaboe, a Church of Ireland church Aghaboe, County Laois, Ireland

== See also ==
- St Canice's Cathedral, Kilkenny, Ireland
