= St. Canice, Aghaboe =

- church
- Location in Ireland
- Coordinates: 52.922158°N 7.5127709°W
- Country: Ireland
- Province: Leinster
- County: County Laois

St. Canice is a Church of Ireland church in the hamlet of Aghaboe in County Laois and is named after St Canice, the founder of the Abbey of Aghaboe, whose ruins are adjacent. It belongs to the parish of Rathdowney in the Diocese of Cashel and Ossory. The building retains 13th century pieces from the adjacent ruins of the Augustinian abbey and, according to the website of the diocese, dates from the 19th century; however, the website of Laois county council says that it dates from the 1700s.

This building should not be confused with the Catholic church of the same name which belongs to the Catholic parish of Aghaboe; the latter building is located in the neighbouring village of Clough.
