= Clough, County Laois =

Village in County Laois, Ireland

Clogh An Chloch
- Village
- Location in Ireland
- Coordinates: 52.8867028°N 7.5104214°W
- Country: Ireland
- Province: Leinster
- County: County Laois

Clough (Irish: An Chloch) is a village in the civil parish of Bordwell in County Laois. It lies at a point where several townlands and two civil parishes meet.

One of the churches of the Roman Catholic parish of Aghaboe, St. Canice, is located in the part of the village which sits on the townland of Chapelhill which lies in the civil parish of Bordwell.
