= Ned Campion =

Irish equestrian (born 1937)

Personal information
- Full name: Edward Campion
- Nationality: Irish
- Born: 19 July 1937 (age 88) Rathdowney, County Laois, Irish Free State

Sport
- Sport: Equestrian

Ned Campion (born 19 July 1937 in Rathdowney, County Laois, Irish Free State) was an Irish equestrian.

An officer in the Irish Army, he competed at the 1968 Summer Olympics represented Ireland on over 65 Nations Cup teams and was on the victorious Irish team that won the Aga Khan Trophy in Dublin in 1967.

Following his retirement from international showjumping in 1977, he served as Chef d'Equipe for the Irish showjumping teams at the Olympic Games in Barcelona in 1992, Atlanta in 1996 and Athens in 2004 and as team manager at the 2000 Summer Olympics in Sydney.
