= Martin Stanislaus Brennan =

American priest & scientist (1845–1927)

The Reverend Martin Stanislaus Brennan
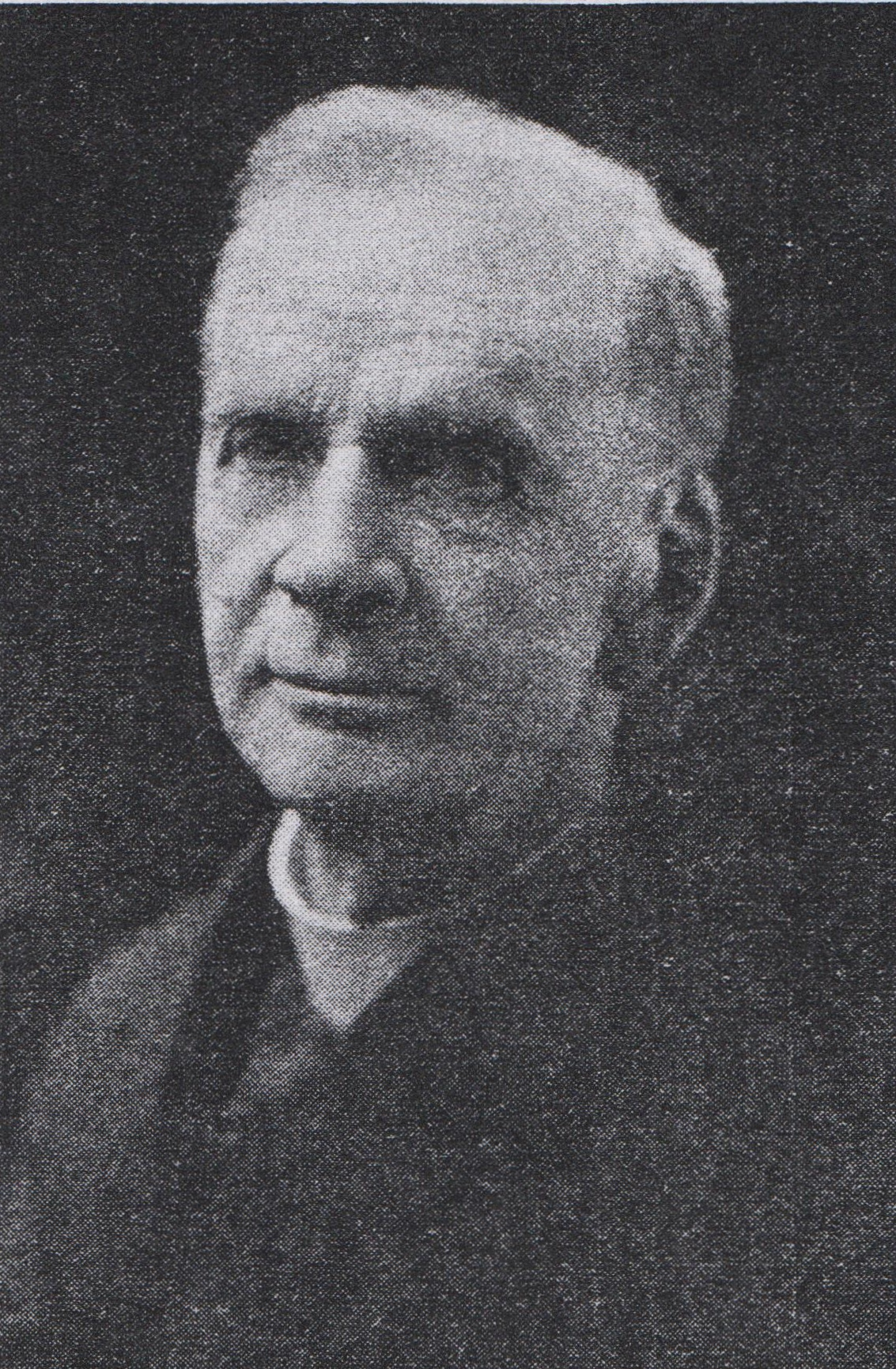
- Portrait of Martin Stanislaus Brennan, From the Year Book of the Old Cathedral Parish School, 1920
- Church: Catholic Church

Orders
- Ordination: 1869

Personal details
- Born: 23 July 1845 Ireland
- Died: October 3, 1927 (aged 82) St. Louis, Missouri
- Buried: Calvary Cemetery St. Louis, Missouri
- Denomination: Roman Catholic

Martin Stanislaus Brennan (July 23, 1845 – October 3, 1927) was an American Roman Catholic priest and scientist known for writing books about religion and science.

Brennan wrote science textbooks for children as well as general interest books on scientific topics and was a popular lecturer in Europe and Palestine as well as in his hometown, St. Louis, Missouri.

== Early life ==
Born in Ballinroe, Castleiney, County Tipperary, Ireland, Brennan's family immigrated to the United States when he was age three, settling in St. Louis. His parents, William C. Brennan and Margaret Hackett, were both from Tipperary. Brennan attended the Cathedral Parish School in St. Louis and served as an altar server at the Cathedral Church.

== Education ==
Brennan attended Christian Brothers College in St. Louis, receiving a Bachelor of Arts in 1865 and a Master of Arts in 1869, He studied theology at Saint Vincent's College in Cape Girardeau, Missouri. In 1869, Brennan was ordained a priest for the Archdiocese of St. Louis. He became a professor of astronomy and geology at Kenrick Theological Seminary in St. Louis in 1892. Brennan obtained a Doctor of Science in 1896 from Christian Brothers.

== Science career ==
Brennan wrote several books about science and religion. Electricity and Its Discoverer's was used as a reference book in the St. Louis Public Schools. His other books included Astronomy, Old and New, What Catholics Have Done for Science, Science of the Bible and God's Word in Nature

Brennan was a nationally known astronomer and a frequent contributor to scientific and general interest newspapers. He frequently delivered lectures on scientific topics to audiences in St. Louis. Known as the "astronomer-priest", his studies of comets and sunspots were cited in contemporary newspapers. Brennan also studied the devastating 1896 St. Louis–East St. Louis tornado.

Brennan was a member of the British Astronomical Association, the Astronomical Society of the Pacific, the Astronomy and Astrophysical Society of America, the St. Louis Academy of Science, the American Mathematical Society, and the National Geological Society.

== Priestly career ==
After his ordination, Brennan served missions in Hannibal, Missouri, and Lebanon, Missouri, before returning to St Louis. He was then assigned as pastor of the Cathedral Parish, then other parishes in the city. In 1892, Brennan was named pastor of Saint Lawrence O'Toole Parish in St. Louis, then moved to Saints Mary and Joseph Parish in January 1910. He was designated a rector of Saint Thomas Aquinas Parish and a monsignor in the Archdiocese of Saint Louis. Pope Pius XI made Brennan a domestic prelate on May 27, 1923.

Brennan was named "the most popular pastor in St. Louis" by nearly 250,000 voters in a vote sponsored by the St. Louis Republic newspaper. Brennan was invited to go on a speaking tour of Europe and Palestine in 1891, where he addressed large audiences. On his return to St. Louis, Brennan lectured about his travels, once to a group of 6000 attendees.

Brennan died of natural causes on October 3, 1927, at age 82 in St. Louis. He was interred at Calvary Cemetery in the city.

== Works ==
- What Catholics Have Done for Science. With Sketches of the Great Catholic Scientists (1887)
- Astronomy, New and Old (1889)
