= William Ridgeway (law reporter) =

Irish barrister and law reporter

William Ridgeway (1765–1817) was an Irish barrister and law reporter.

== Life ==
Ridgeway graduated at Trinity College, Dublin, as B.A. in 1787, LL.B. in 1790, and LL.D. in 1795. He was called to the bar, and acted as one of the crown counsel in state trials, notably in that of Robert Emmet in 1803, of Edward Sheridan and Thomas Kirwan in 1811–12, and of Roger O'Connor and Martin McKeon in 1817.

Ridgeway died at Dublin of typhus fever, caught while on circuit at Trim, County Meath, on 1 December 1817.

== Works ==
In 1774 Ridgeway was entrusted by Philip Tisdall, Attorney-General for Ireland, with the publication of Reports of Cases argued and determined in the King's Bench and Chancery during the time of Lord Hardwicke's Presidency (1733–7). Marginal notes contain the substance of the decisions given, with a collation of authorities and references. Ridgeway prepared the official reports of the proceedings against William Jackson in 1795 and the Sheares brothers in 1798; they appeared in the State Trials. Other works published by Ridgeway were:

- Reports of Cases upon Appeal and Writs of Error in the High Court of Parliament in Ireland since the Restoration of the Appellate Jurisdiction, 3 vols. 1795–8.
- Term Reports of Cases in the King's Court in Dublin, 34–35 George III (with William Lapp and John Schoales), 1796.
- Reports of State Trials in Ireland, 1798–1803, 3 vols. 1803.
- Reports of Proceedings in Cases of High Treason at a Court of Oyer and Terminer held under Special Commission, August and September 1803, 1803.
- Report of Proceedings under Special Commission of Oyer and Terminer and Gaol Delivery for Sligo, Mayo, Leitrim, Longford, and Cavan in December 1806, 1807.
- Proceedings in Case of T. Kirwan and E. Sheridan, 1811.
- Proceedings against H. Fitzpatrick for Libel on the Duke of Richmond, 1813.
- Report of Trial of Roger O'Connor and Martin M'Keon, 1817 (finished by R. W. Greene).

== Family ==
Ridgeway married a daughter of Edward Ledwich, and left seven children.

== Notes ==
Attribution

This article incorporates text from a publication now in the public domain: Lee, Sidney, ed. (1896). "Ridgeway, William". Dictionary of National Biography. Vol. 48. London: Smith, Elder & Co.
