= R502 road (Ireland) =

Road in Ireland

R502 road
- Bóthar R502
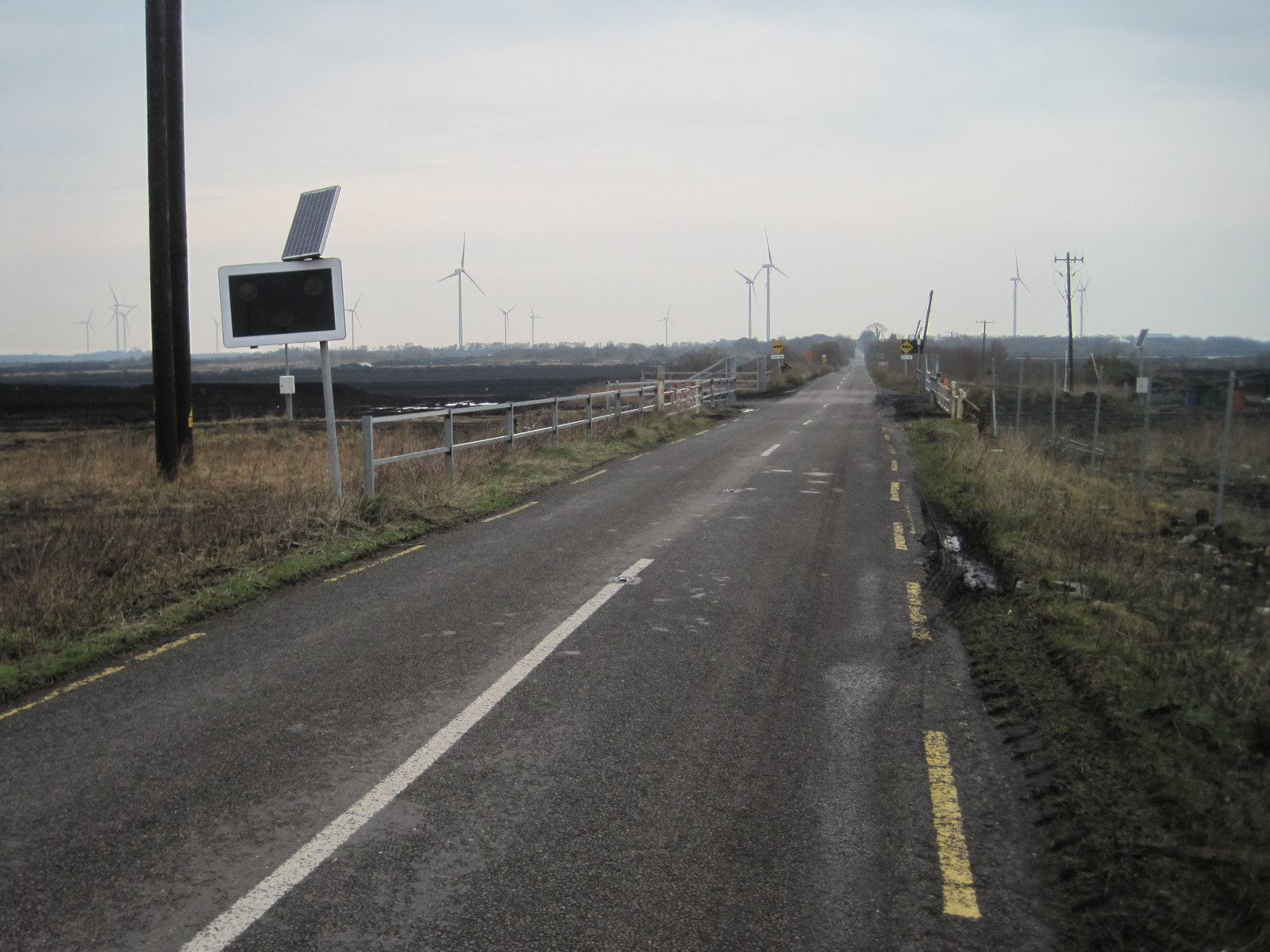
- Narrow gauge railway crossing on the R502 in County Kilkenny

Route information
- Length: 21 km (13 mi)

Location
- Country: Ireland
- Primary destinations: County Tipperary; Templemore – starts at junction with R433 approx 1 km from town.; Bridge over Dublin-Cork railway line; Bridge over River Suir; Junction with L3205 to Castleiney.; Templetuohy; Terminates at the N8, Johnstown

Highway system
- Roads in Ireland; Motorways; Primary; Secondary; Regional

The R502 road is a regional road in Ireland. It links the R433 at a point approximately 1 km from Templemore, County Tipperary and the R639 at Johnstown, County Kilkenny where it joins the R435. It passes through Templetuohy, County Tipperary.

== See also ==
- Roads in Ireland
- National primary road
- National secondary road
