= Edward Ledwich =

Irish historian, antiquary and topographer

Edward Ledwich LL.D. F.S.A. (1738 – 8 August 1823) was an Irish historian, antiquary and topographer.

== Life ==
Ledwich was born in Dublin, the son of John Ledwich, a merchant. He was educated at Trinity College, Dublin, entering on 22 November 1755, and taking a B.A. in 1760 and a LL.B. in 1763. He became vicar of Aghaboe in 1772, which he must have resigned in 1797, as his successor was then appointed.

Ledwich died at his house in York Street, Dublin, on 8 August 1823.

== Works ==
In 1790, Ledwich published his Antiquities of Ireland. It was later discounted, because of the imperfect information on Irish history current in his day, and his theories were effectually set aside by George Petrie and later writers. In the index to John Lanigan's Ecclesiastical History there are errata to Ledwich. His article on the History and Antiquities of Irishtown and Kilkenny, published in 1781, was appended to the second edition of his Antiquities of Ireland, 1804.

In 1791, Ledwich completed the editing and publication of his friend Francis Grose's Antiquities of Ireland.

Publications

- The Antiquities of Ireland (2nd ed.), Dublin, Printed by and for J. Jones, 1804
- The Antiquities of Ireland , with Francis Grose
  - Volume 1, 1791
  - Volume 2, 1795

== Family ==
A daughter married the barrister William Ridgeway.
