= Middlemount (townland) =

Townland in County Laois, Ireland

Middlemount (part of which is also called Ballyvoghlaun) is a townland in County Laois.

Most of the townland (434 acres, including the townland house, Middlemount House) is in the eastern exclave of Coolkerry civil parish. This part is also known as Ballyvoghlaun.

The remaining part of the townland (190 acres, including the gate lodge for Middlemount House) is in the arm of Aghaboe civil parish which separate the eastern exclave of Coolkerry from the main, western part of Coolkerry.

== Middlemount Moat ==
The part of Middlemount townland which lies in Aghaboe civil parish contains a motte which, on the Ordnance Survey map, is called Middlemount Moat. It is sometimes called also the Moat of Laragh or the Mote of Monacoghlan. (The words moat, mote and motte are all related; moat, which now means a deep wide ditch, was originally a variant of mote, n^{2}, a natural or man-made mound, from which comes the modern word motte.) Carrigan describes Middlemount Moat as "a truncated cone 16 yards in diameter at the top, 25 to 30 ft. high".
