= Aghaboe =

Hamlet in County Laois, Ireland

Aghaboe Achadh Bhó
- Village
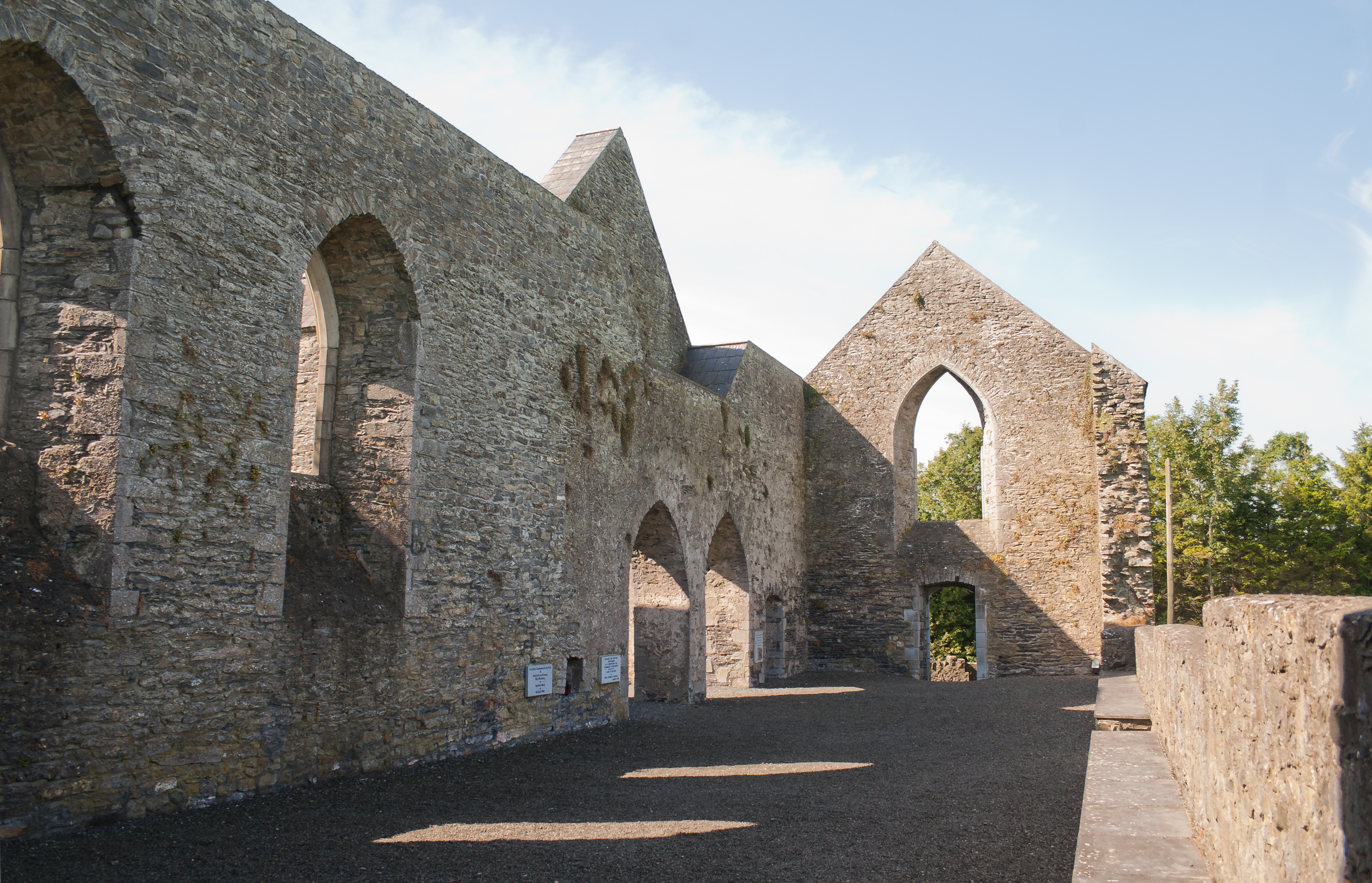
- Aghaboe Abbey

- Location in Ireland
- Coordinates: 52.9221008°N 7.5142637°W
- Country: Ireland
- Province: Leinster
- County: County Laois

Aghaboe (Irish: Achadh Bhó, meaning 'field of cows') is a small village in County Laois, Ireland. It is located on the R434 regional road in the rural hinterland west of the town of Abbeyleix.

It contains the ruins of the Abbey of Aghaboe which was founded by St. Canice in the Ossory in the 6th century and, beside it, the church that later would become the Church of Ireland church of St. Canice. At some point before the Norman invasion of Ireland, Aghaboe Abbey succeeded Seirkieran as the principle abbey in Ossory. Canice built a daughter house of Aghaboe was at Kilkenny, the principal town of Ossory. The Synod of Rathbreasail in 1111, which first divided Ireland into territorial dioceses, included both Aghaboe and Kilkenny in the Diocese of Ossory, with the episcopal see at Kilkenny, whose abbey church became St Canice's Cathedral. The erroneous belief that the see was originally at Aghaboe and later transferred to Kilkenny is traced by John Bradley to a 16th-century misinterpretation of a 13th-century property transfer.

Near the ruins of the abbey is the mound of a motte, a wooden tower would have been built in the top of the motte as a store for arms and a watchtower in case of attack. The platform at the top is 14 metres (46 ft) across and is reached by a winding path and a stone wall used to encircle the summit.

Aghaboe is in the barony of Clandonagh. The civil parish has an area of 74.7 square kilometres (28.8 sq mi) and is divided into 66 townlands.

Aghaboe was the first seat of St. Feargal, who later traveled through Francia and became bishop of Salzburg, Austria, and was canonised in 1233 by Pope Gregory IX.

== See also ==
- List of towns and villages in Ireland
