= R433 road (Ireland) =

Road in Ireland

R433 road
- Bóthar R433
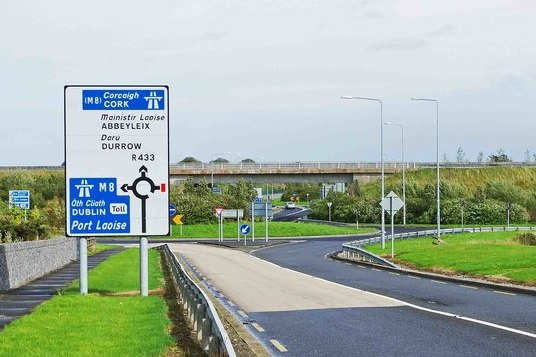
- Signage on the R433 near the junction with M8 motorway in County Laois

Route information
- Length: 37 km (23 mi)

Location
- Country: Ireland
- Primary destinations: County Tipperary; Templemore leave the (N62); R502 joins/leaves approx 1 km from Templemore; Crosses River Suir; Clonmore; Crosses Dublin-Cork railway line at Tipperary-Laois county boundary adjacent to Lisduff quarry.; County Laois; Errill; Rathdowney R435 joins/leaves; Forms Junction 3 of the M8 motorway; Ballycolla R434; N77 terminates south of Abbeyleix

Highway system
- Roads in Ireland; Motorways; Primary; Secondary; Regional

The R433 road is a regional road in Ireland linking Templemore, County Tipperary and Abbeyleix, County Laois. It passes through the village of Clonmore, County Tipperary and Errill, County Laois and the towns of Rathdowney and Ballycolla, between which it forms junction 3 of the M8 Cork-Dublin motorway before terminating at Abbeyleix.

The road is 37 km (23 mi) long.

== See also ==
- Roads in Ireland
- National primary road
- National secondary road
