= Aghaboe (townland) =

Townland in County Laois, Ireland

Coordinates: 52.929235°N 7.515361°W

Aghaboe is a townland in Aghaboe civil parish in County Laois.
