= Ballacolla =

Village in County Laois, Ireland

Ballacolla Baile Cholla
- Village
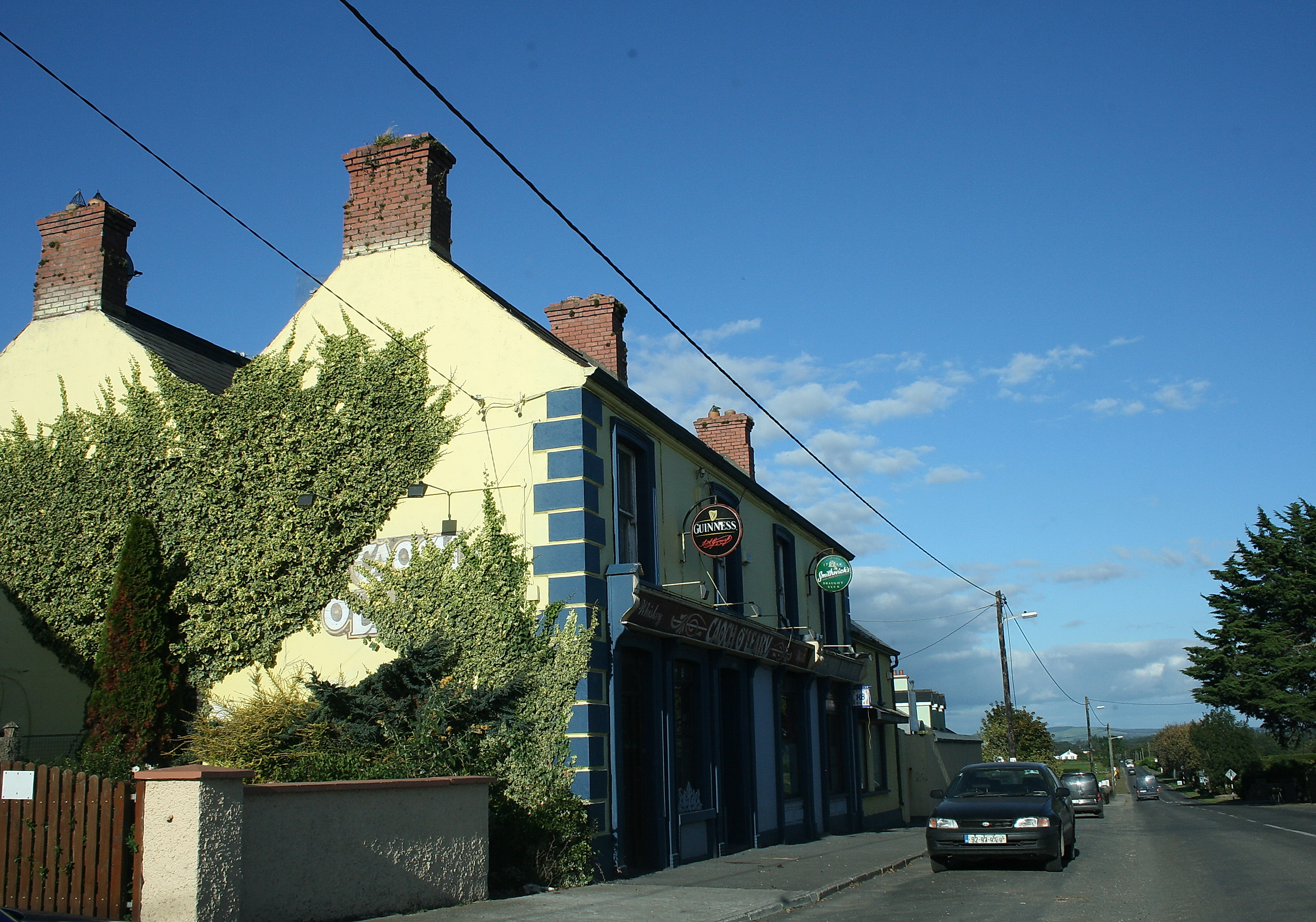
- Pub in Ballycolla

- Location in Ireland
- Coordinates: 52.8825°N 7.4468°W
- Country: Ireland
- Province: Leinster
- County: County Laois

Population (2016)
  - Total: 136
- Time zone: UTC+0 (WET)
  - Summer (DST): UTC-1 (IST (WEST))

Ballacolla, officially Ballycolla (Irish: Baile Cholla), is a village in County Laois, Ireland. It sits at the crossroads of the R433 and R434 regional roads, 8 km (5.0 mi) southwest of Abbeyleix and 4 km northeast of junction 3 of the M8 motorway. ‘In Irish it is called Bolliacholla, i.e., Baile a’ Chalaidh, the townland of the ... long, coarse, sedgy grass’ de réir an Chorragánaigh; deir sé ‘Dr. Joyce’s explanation … town of a man named Colla, is incorrect’.

As of the 2016 census, Ballacolla had a population of 136 people.

== See also ==
- List of towns and villages in Ireland
