= Bordwell =

Civil parish in County Laois, Ireland

Bordwell, or Boardwell, is a civil parish in County Laois, Ireland.

== Townlands ==
Its townlands are:

- Beckfield North
- Beckfield South
- Bordwell Big
- Bordwell Little
- Chapelhill
- Coolfin
- Court
- Curragh
- Farranville
- Garryniska
- Grantstown
- Kilbreedy
- Oldglass
- Rahandrick Lower
- Rahandrick Upper
- Shanvaghey
- Tinnaragh
