= Rathdowney =

Town in County Laois, Ireland

Rathdowney Irish: Ráth Domhnaigh
- Town
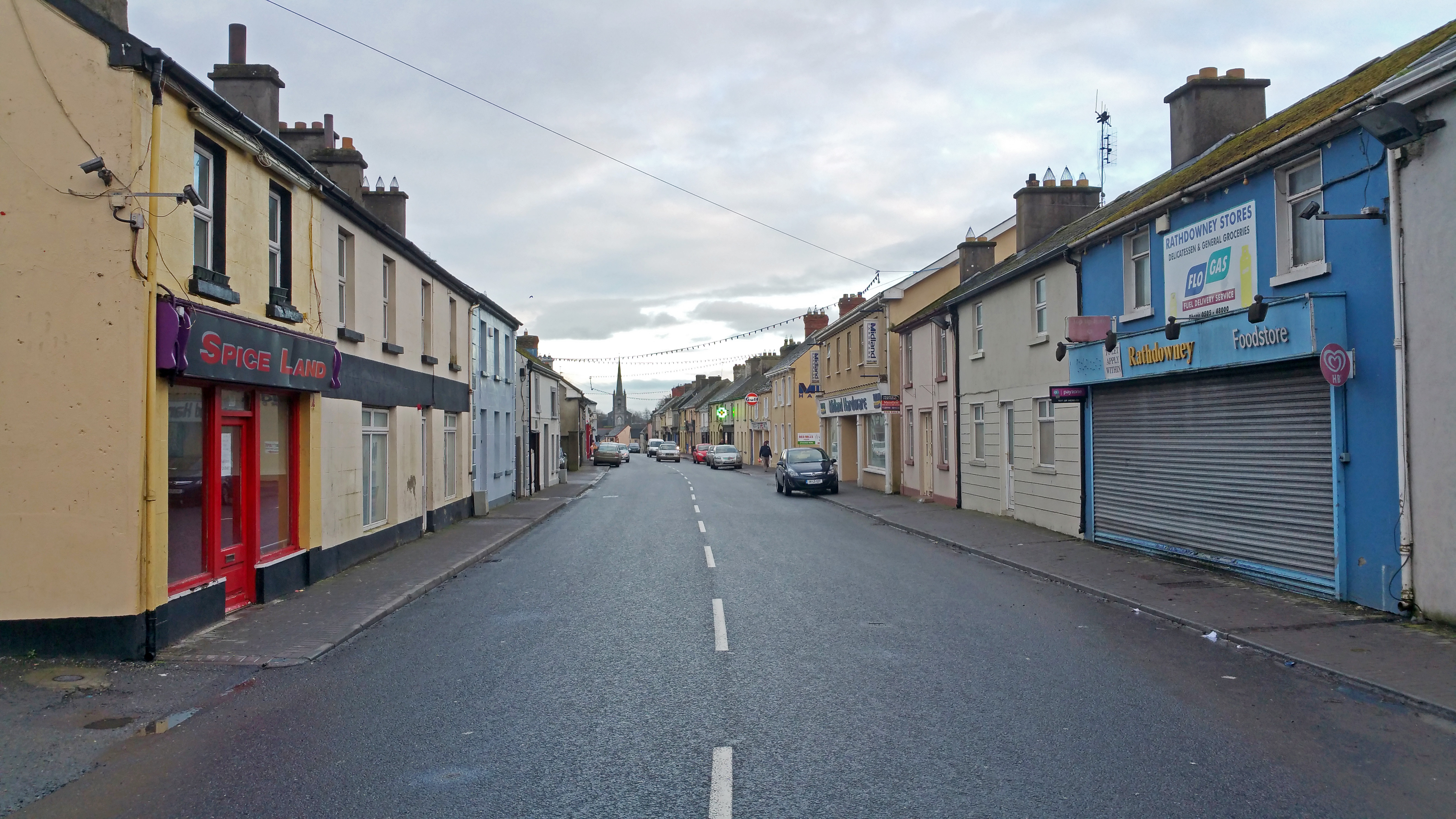
- Main Street

- Location in Ireland
- Coordinates: 52°51′19″N 7°35′05″W
- Country: Ireland
- Province: Leinster
- County: County Laois
- Elevation: 100 m (330 ft)

Population (2016)
  - Total: 1,271
- Irish Grid Reference: S279783

Rathdowney or Rathdowny (Irish: Ráth Domhnaigh, meaning 'ringfort of the church') is a small town in southwest County Laois, Ireland. It lies some 32 km southwest of Portlaoise in the Irish Midlands, at the point where the R433 regional road from Abbeyleix to Templemore is crossed by the R435 from Borris-in-Ossory to Johnstown. The R433 provides access for Rathdowney to the Dublin-Cork M8 motorway, while the R435 links the town to the Dublin-Limerick M7. As of the 2016 census, the population of Rathdowney was 1,271. The town is in a townland and civil parish of the same name.

== History ==
Rathdowney is named after a nearby ringfort, or ráth, which was levelled in 1830. This ráth is mentioned three times in the Annals of the Four Masters:

- 874 Flaithri, son of Máel Dúin, Lord of Rath-Tamhnaighe (Rathdowney) died
- 909 Maelpadraig, son of Flaithri, Lord of Rath-Tamhnaighe, died
- 1069 Gillamoula, grandson of Bruaideadh, Lord of Rath-Tamhnaighe

The settlement of Rathdowney has existed since at least the 9th century. Historically it forms part of the Kingdom of Osraige, and today it remains part of the Roman Catholic Diocese of Ossory, as such Rathdowney is not historically part of Laois. The present-day county of Laois is a modern administrative construct. A half mile southeast of Rathdowney, there stood until 1836, the ruins of a castle called Rathpiper, which most probably took its name from "Pipard", a descendant of Adam de Hereford. This locality of "Pyperath" within Rathdowny parish appears to have been a royal site associated with the medieval Mac Giolla Phádraig dynasty, as documents relating to meeting there in 1558 show.

The Croppy's Grave located in the town's central square is the still visible cobbled grave of a croppy revolutionary hanged and buried there in 1798. The site also contains a recent memorial.

The town was raided at least once by anti-treaty forces during the Irish Civil War of 1922 to 1923.

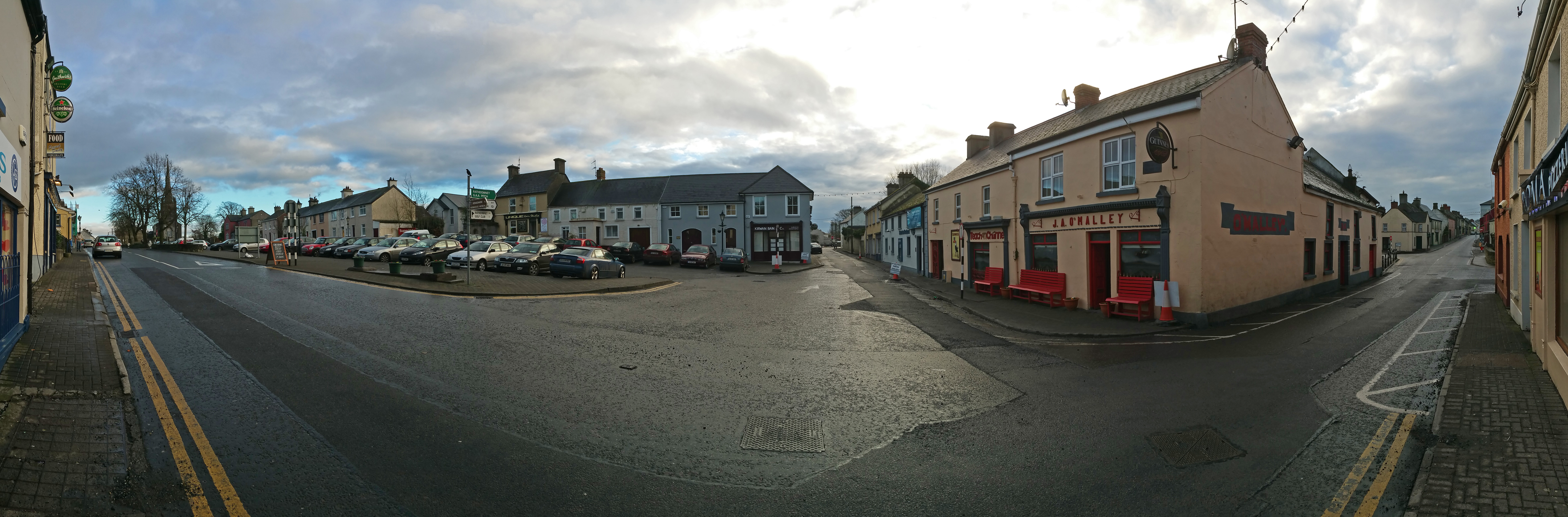
Panorama of Rathdowney with Church Street on the left, Ossory Street to the centre, Main Street on the right

== Churches ==
Saint Andrew's Church of Ireland church, which overlooks the town's square, was built in the early 19th century. It stands on the traditional site of the pre-Reformation church. A Roman Catholic church was constructed on the main street in the 1830s, and this church served the Catholic population of the area for the next 120 years before it too was demolished; to be replaced by a shrine and carpark. A new larger Catholic church, the Church of the Holy Trinity, was designed by Simon Aloysius Leonard and built on the west side of the town in the 1950s.

There are a number of "mass pits" (outdoor areas used for Catholic masses during penal times) located in the vicinity of the town.

== Economy ==
The Meadow Meats processing plant is part of the Dawn Meats Group and was the largest employer in the town. This factory stands on the old Perry's Brewery site, it was purchased by Lyons Meats in 1968 and converted by them to a meat processing facility, which went into production in 1971. Rathdowney is also something of a centre for several outlying villages and is a focal point for the surrounding agricultural hinterland.

== People ==
- Tony Byrne, international footballer.
- Ned Campion, international showjumper.
- Kieran Patrick Kelly, suspected serial killer.
- Edward Ledwich, historian, antiquary and topographer, was curate in Rathdowney for a time.
- John Moyney, an Irish recipient of the Victoria Cross, was born in Rathdowney.
- James Pearson, also a Victoria Cross recipient from Rathdowney.
- Kieran Phelan, Irish politician, member of Seanad 2002–2010.
- Thomas Prior, author and founder of the Royal Dublin Society.

== See also ==
- List of towns and villages in Ireland
