= Aghaboe Abbey =

Aghaboe Achadh Bhó
- ruin
- Location in Ireland
- Coordinates: 52.9222421°N 7.5139082°W
- Country: Ireland
- Province: Leinster
- County: County Laois

The Abbey of Aghaboe is one of the most important of the abbeys and priories in County Laois. It was founded in the kingdom of Osraige by St. Canice in the 6th century. In his Vita Sancti Columbae (Life of St. Columba), Adomnán refers to the abbey, saying that its name means a (little field) of the cow: "quod Latine Campulus Bovis dicitur, Scotice vero Achadh-bou"

== History ==
The abbey grew into a major centre of learning, commerce and agriculture. Among the monks from the abbey was St. Virgilius (Feargal or Farrell), a noted geometer and astronomer who was abbot before he left Ireland and built the cathedral at Salzburg in Austria in the 8th century. He was canonized in 1233.

The Annals of Inisfallen note that "Repose of Scandlán grandson of Tadc, abbot of Achad Bó" happened in the year 782.

A daughter house of Aghaboe was later built at Kilkenny, the capital of Osraige. The Synod of Rathbreasail in 1111, which first divided Ireland into territorial dioceses, included both Aghaboe and Kilkenny in the Diocese of Ossory, with the episcopal see at Kilkenny, whose abbey church became St Canice's Cathedral. The erroneous belief that the see was originally at Aghaboe and later transferred to Kilkenny is traced by John Bradley to a 16th-century misinterpretation of a 13th-century property transfer. The original Aghaboe monastery burned in 1234, and was rebuilt as an Augustinian priory.

In 1346 "The one eyed Diarmaid Mac Giollaphádraig ... aided by the Uí Céarbhail ... burned the town of Aghaboe and the cemetery and church and cruelly forsaking St. Canice, abbot, patron of the neighbourhood and found of the place, he, like a degenerate son to his father, burnt and completely destroyed with the crullest fire, the saint's shrine with his bones and relics.". This event was very likely accidental; Aghaboe Abbey had been long under the protection of the Mac Giollaphádraigs of Upper Ossory and its burning occurred during a Mac Giollaphádraig attack on the Norman fortifications which had been built next to the abbey, and which can still be seen today. The ruins on the site belong to a Dominican friary founded in 1382 by Finghan MacGillapatrick, Lord of Upper Ossory. The church, which was conserved by the local community, contains a beautifully carved three-light window in the east wall.

The abbey was suppressed in 1540. In 1984, Dr. Jakob Mayr archbishop of Salzburg visited the abbey, in honour of St. Vergilius. In 1994, Irish President Mary McAleese visited the abbey, and in 2001 the Austrian ambassador, Dr. Paul Leifer also visited. It has also been a place of recurrent heritage pilgrimage by the members of the Fitzpatrick-Mac Giolla Phádraig Clan Society.

The civil parish of Aghaboe and the Roman Catholic parish of Aghaboe, which differ greatly from each other in extent, are both named after the abbey.

== Burials ==
- Cainnech of Aghaboe

== Image gallery ==
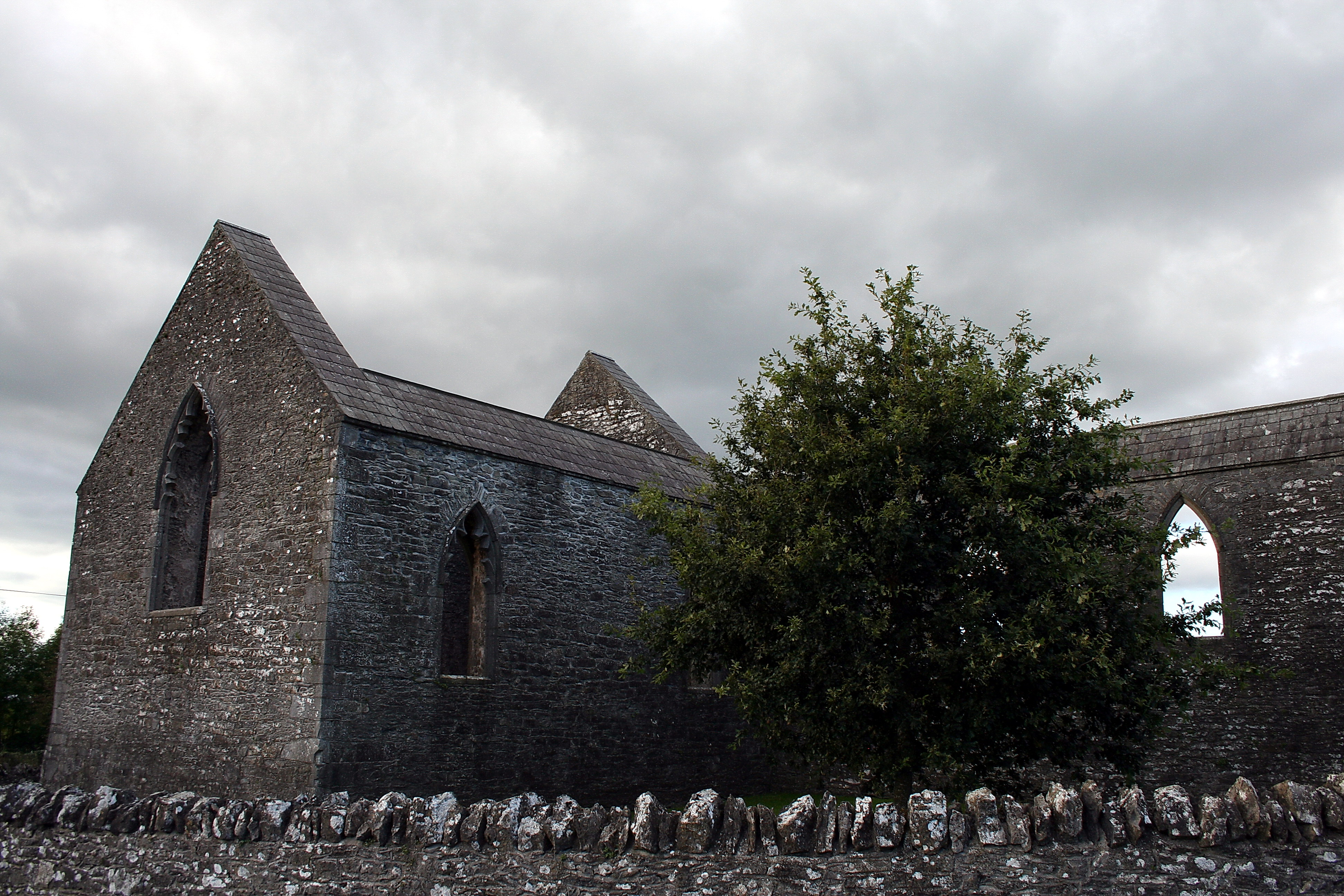
Aghaboe, partially restored (1986)

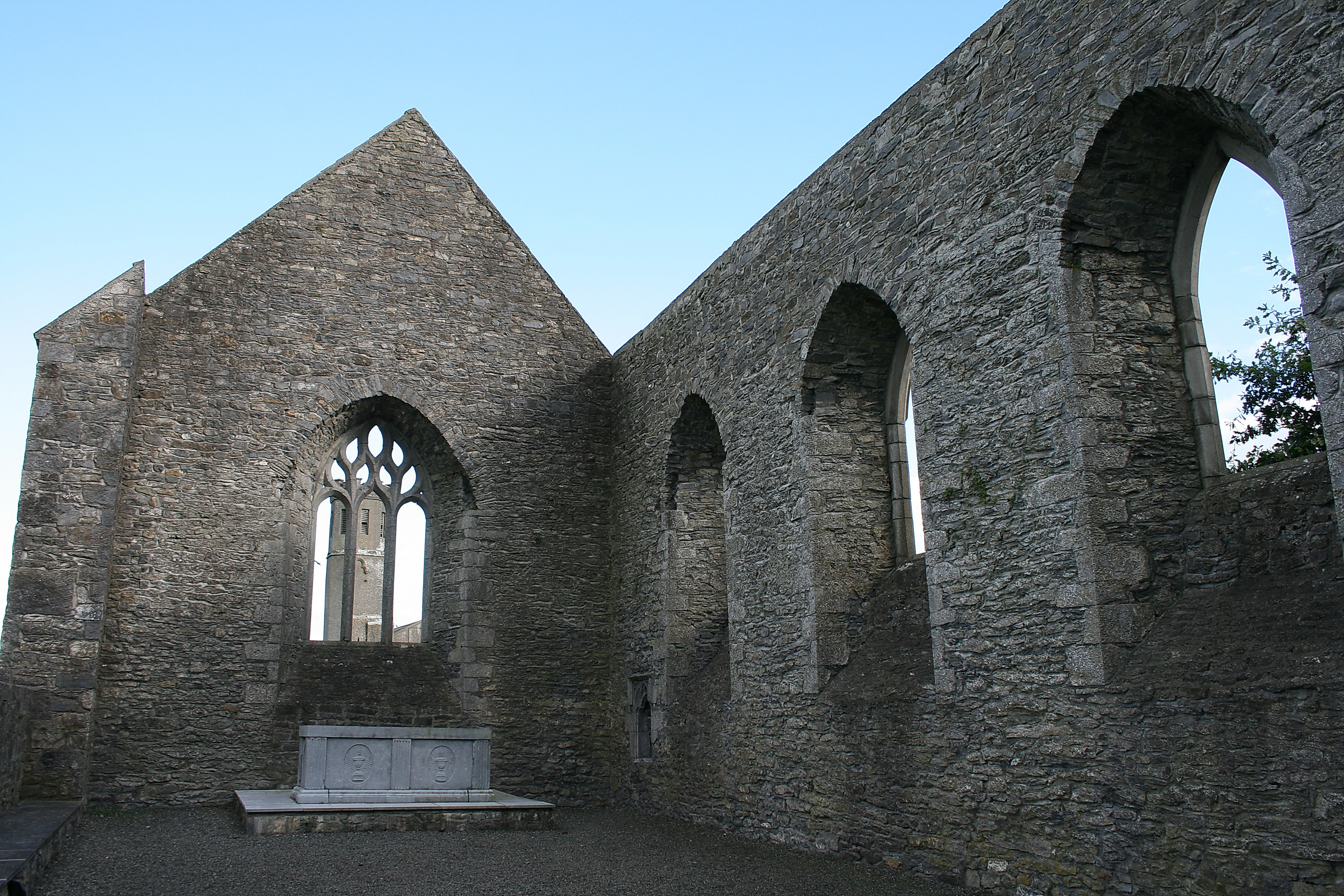
Aghaboe, this partially restored ruin was built in 1382

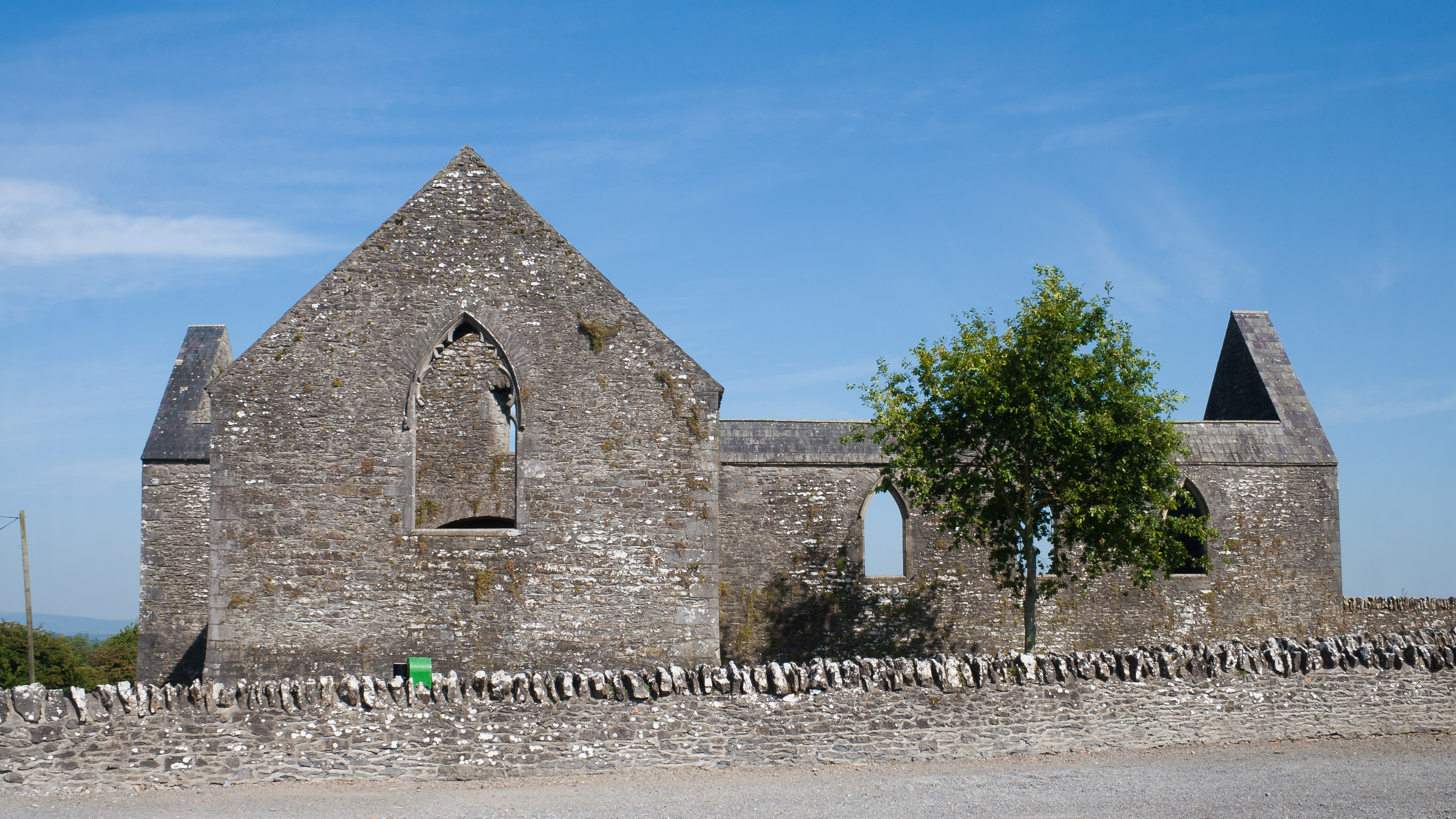
South view

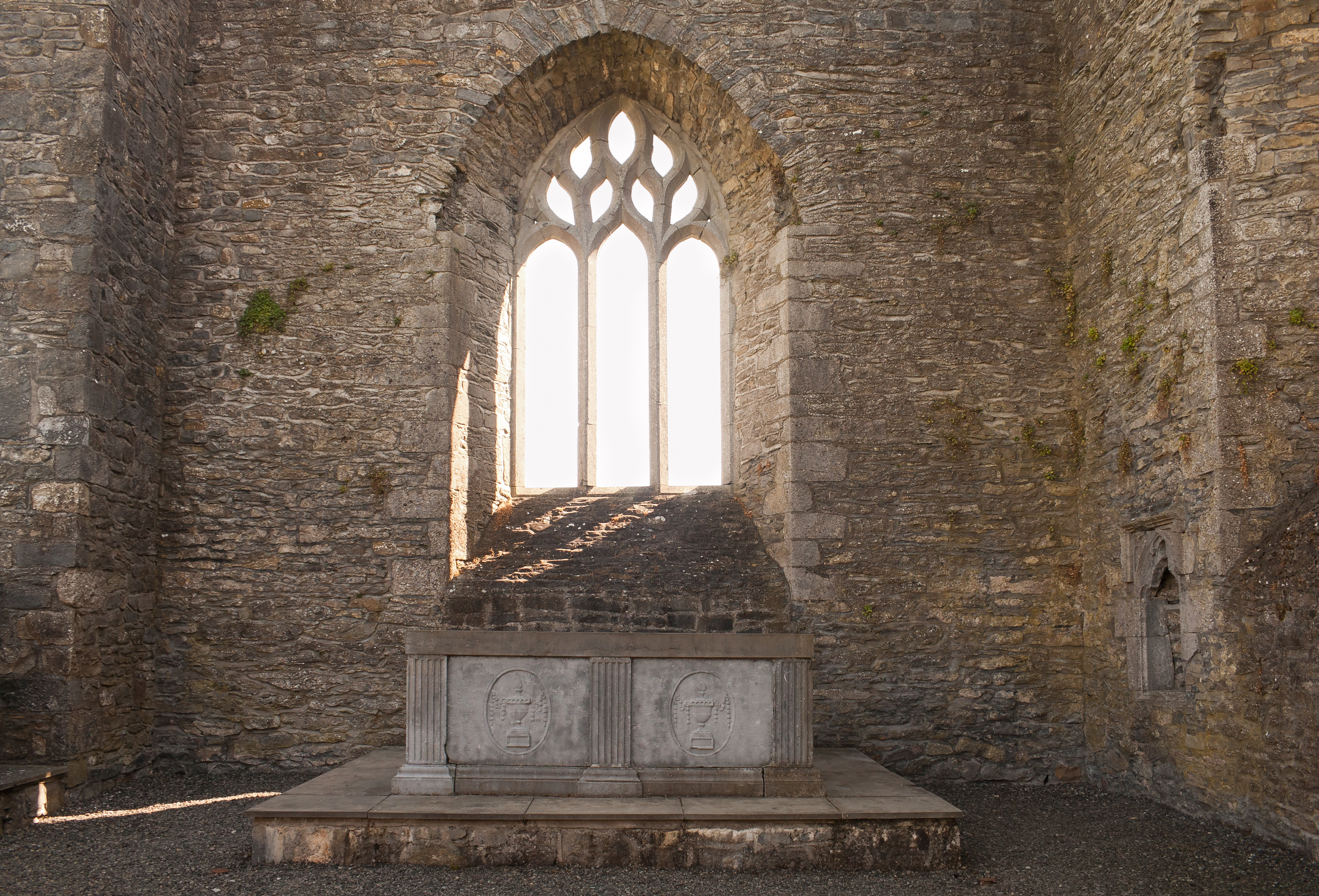
East window and altar

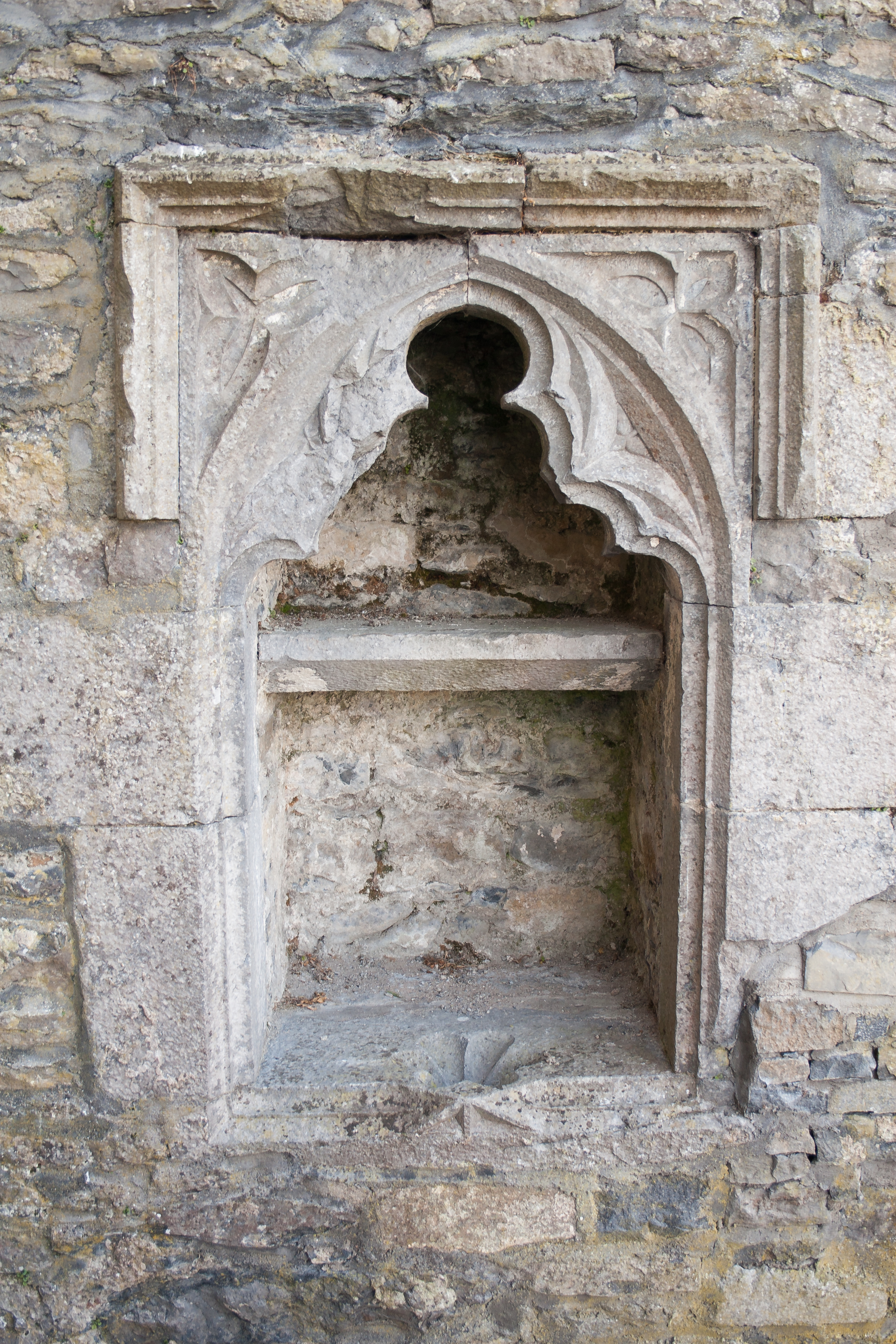
Piscina in the choir

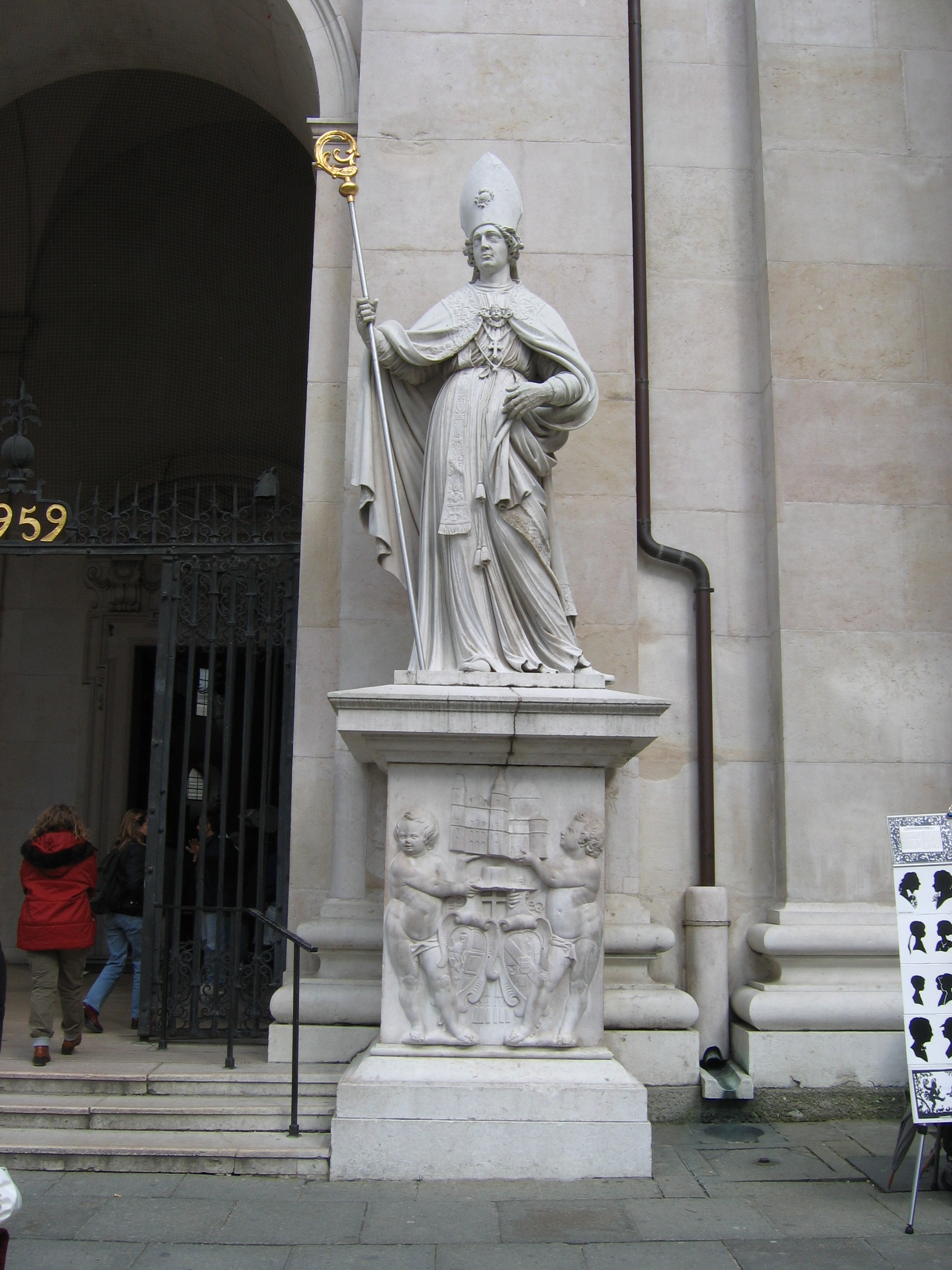
Statue of Saint Vergilius at the Salzburg Cathedral

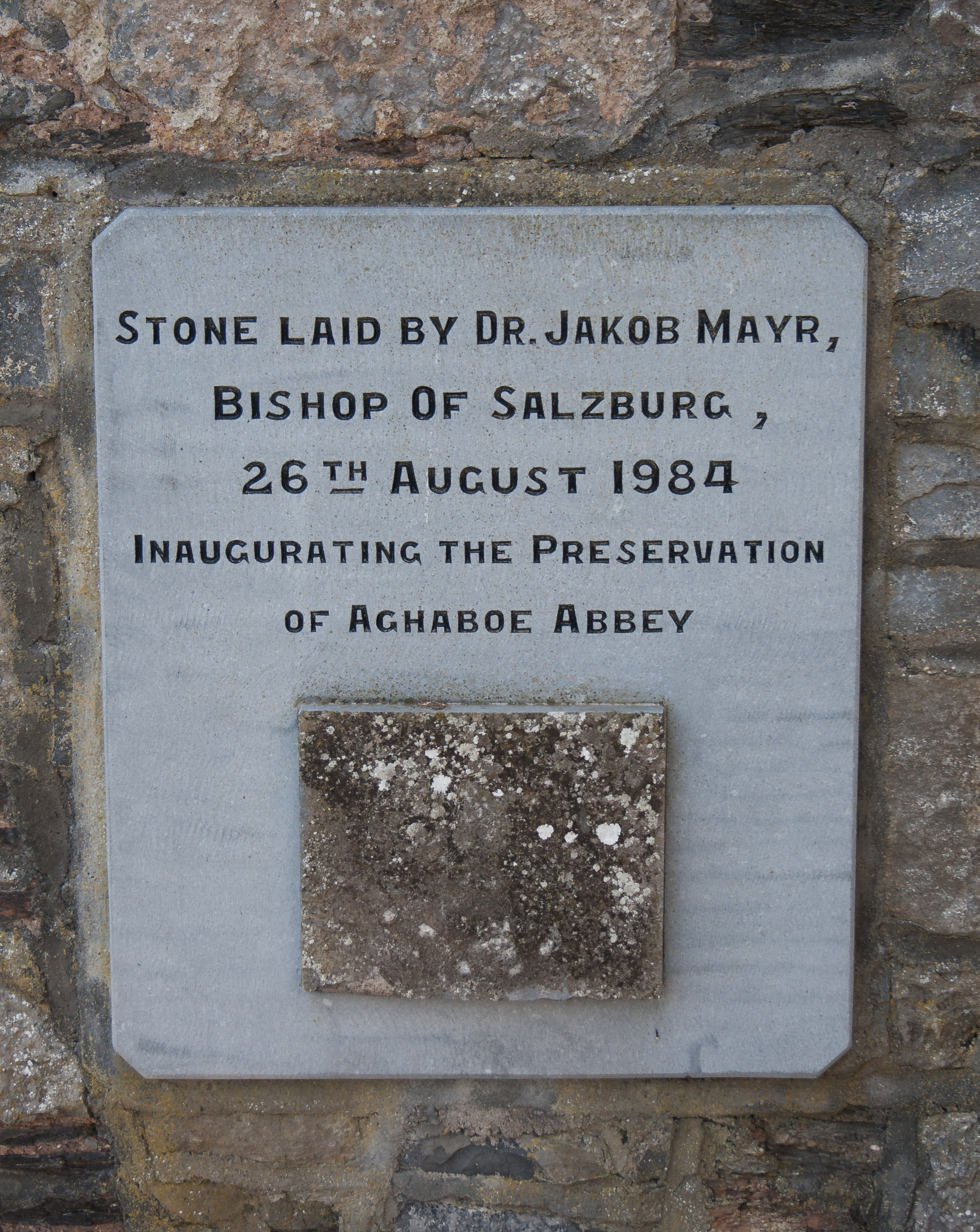

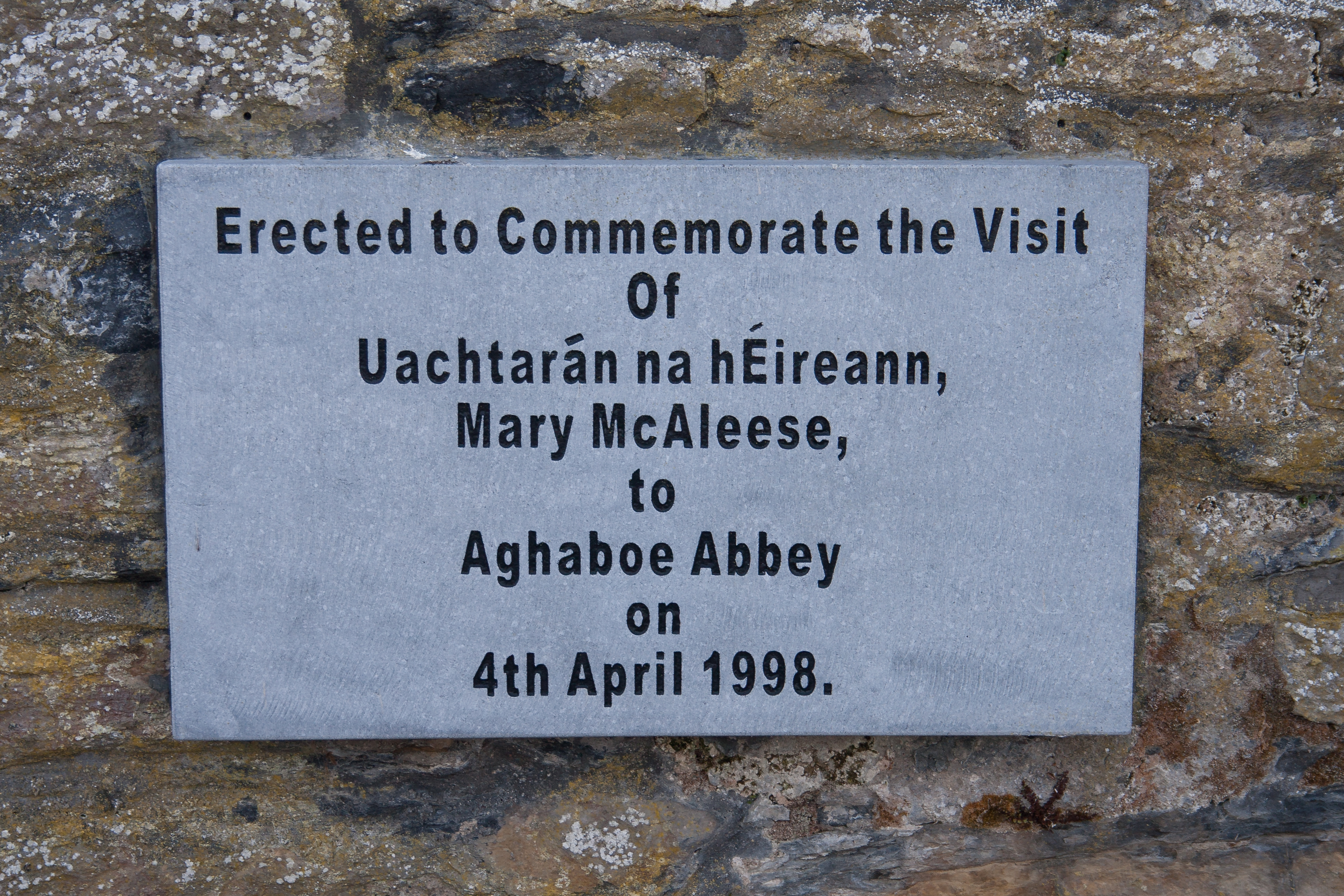

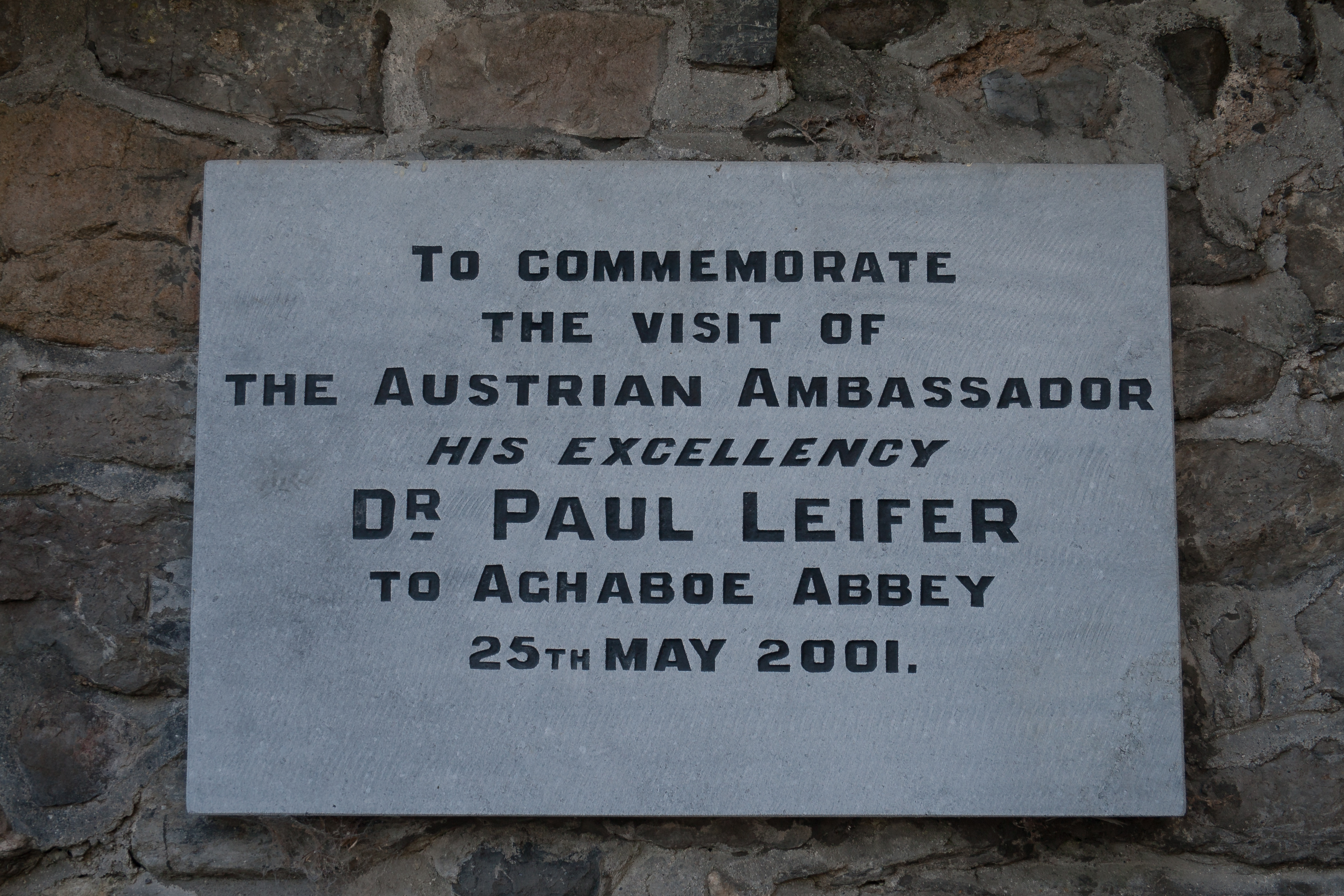
