= Aghaboe (civil parish) =

- civil parish

Irish transcription(s)
  - Derivation: Achadh-Beu
  - Meaning: "the field of an ox"
- Aghaboe shown within Ireland
- Coordinates: 52°53′42″N 7°32′22″W
- Country: Ireland
- County: Laois
- Barony: Clandonnagh

Aghaboe, or Aughavoe, is a civil parish in County Laois. It lies partly in the barony of Clarmallagh and partly in the barony of Clandonagh.

== Church of Ireland parish ==
As with other civil parishes in Ireland, the civil parish of Aghaboe was derived from, and is co-extensive with, a pre-existing ecclesiastical parish of the Church of Ireland. However, due to reorganization of the church, the ecclesiastical parish no longer exists, having been subsumed into the parish of Rathdowney in the Diocese of Cashel and Ossory.

The historian, antiquary and topographer, Edward Ledwich was a vicar of the Church of Ireland parish; he was appointed in 1772 and must have resigned in 1797 as his successor was appointed in that year.

== Early Irish church ==
In the early Irish church, a parish was an ecclesiastical unit of territory based on the Gaelic territorial unit called a túath or on early Christian and monastic settlements. In the case of Aghaboe, the parish seems based on the ministry of the early mediaeval Abbey of Aghaboe, whose Irish language name, Achadh Bhó, means "Ox's Field".

== Townlands ==
The townlands that make up the parish are:

- Aghaboe
- Anster
- Ardvarney
- Ballybrophy
- Ballycolla Town
- Ballycuddahy
- Ballygarvan Glebe
- Ballygeehin Lower
- Ballygeehin Upper
- Ballygowdan
- Ballyhinode
- Ballykeevan
- Ballyowen
- Ballyreilly
- Barnasallagh
- Baunbrack
- Baunoge
- Boherard
- Borris-in-Ossory Town
- Bushfield
- Cappagh
- Carrowreagh
- Chapelhill
- Coolbally
- Coolfin
- Corraun
- Cross
- Cruell
- Cuffsborough
- Dairyhill
- Delligabaun
- Derrin
- Derrinoliver
- Derrinsallagh
- Derryvorrigan
- Doon
- Farraneglish Glebe
- Fearagh
- Friarsland
- Garryduff
- Gortnaclea
- Gortnagroagh
- Grange Beg
- Grange More
- Grantstown
- Keelough Glebe
- Kilbeg
- Kilcotton
- Kildellig
- Kilminfoyle
- Kilnaseer
- Knockamullin
- Knockaroe
- Knockfin
- Knockkyle
- Knockseera
- Kyletilloge
- Leap
- Legaun
- Lismore
- Maghernaskeagh
- Middlemount
- Moanfad
- Oldglass
- Palmershill
- Park
- Sentryhill
- Shanboe
- Skeagh
- Springfield
- Tinnaragh
- Tinnaraheen
- Tintore
- Tooreagh
- Townparks
