= River Erkina =

River in County Laois, Ireland

Coordinates: 52°50′51″N 7°22′40″W

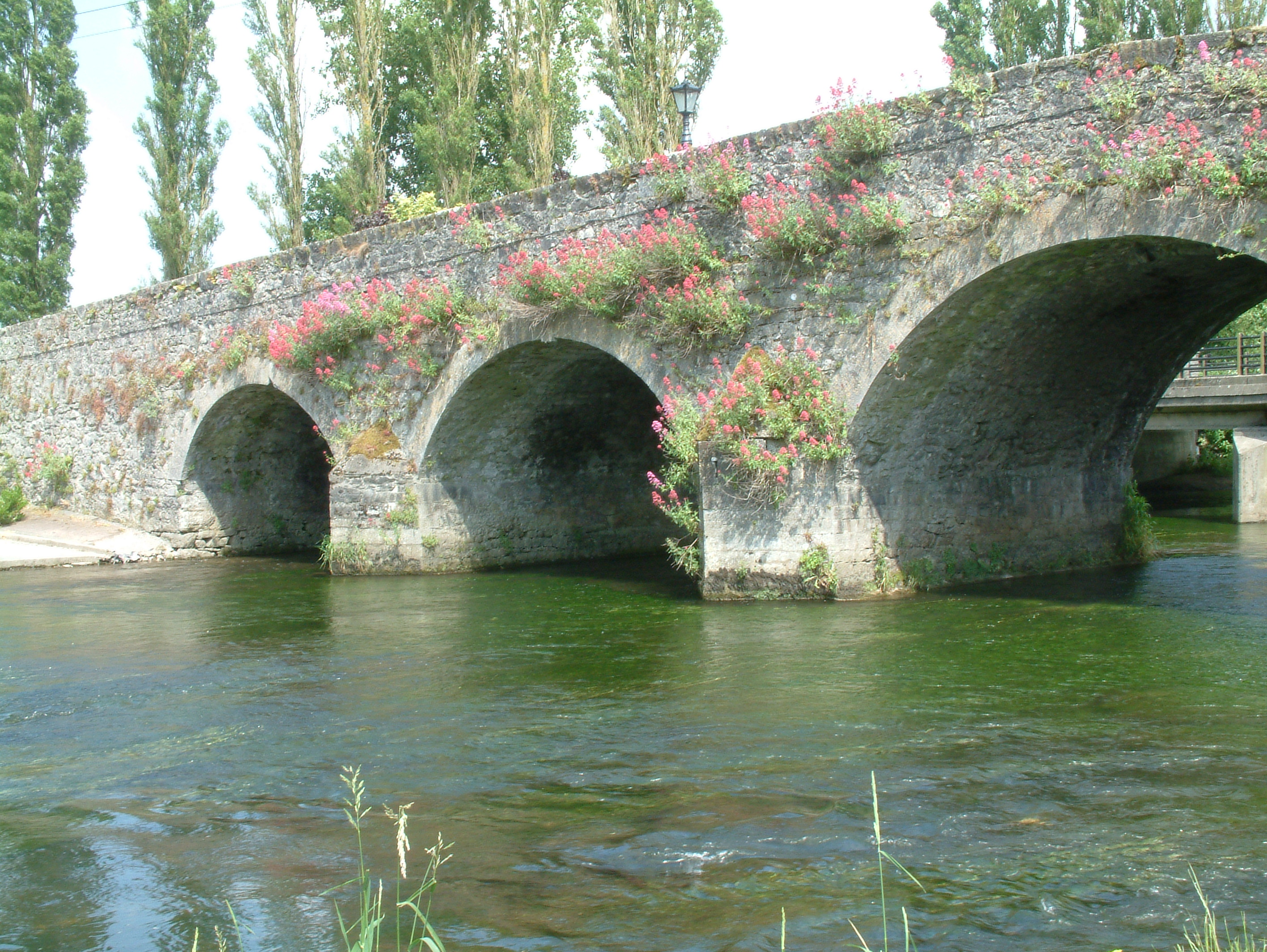
- River Erkina at Durrow, County Laois
- Etymology: Irish oircín, "little tail"/"piglet"?
- Native name: An tOircín (Irish)

Physical characteristics
- Source
  - location: south of Rathdowney
- Mouth
  - location: Celtic Sea via River Nore
- Length: 36.2 km (22.5 mi)
- Basin size: 387 km^{2} (149 sq mi)
- Discharge
  - average: 5.69 m^{3}/s (201 cu ft/s)

The River Erkina (Irish: An tOircín) is a river that flows through the county of Laois in Ireland. It is a tributary of the River Nore.

It has its source on the Laois-Kilkenny border south of Rathdowney. It flows north towards Rathdowney and then turns east in the direction of Durrow entering the River Nore around 1.5 km east of the town.

== See also ==
Rivers of Ireland
