= William Flower (Irishtown MP) =

Anglo-Irish soldier, politician and landowner

Sir William Flower (c.1600–c.1682) was an Anglo-Irish soldier, politician and landowner of the seventeenth century. He fought for Oliver Cromwell during the English Civil War but was imprisoned as a suspected Royalist, a suspicion later confirmed by the rewards he received after the Restoration of Charles II. His descendants still hold the titles Viscount Ashbrook and Baron Castle Durrow.

== Early life ==
He is said to have been born in Chepstow, Monmouthshire. The Flowers (originally named Flore) were an old Rutland family who had been settled at Whitwell since the fourteenth century. It is likely that William grew up in Ireland, where his father Sir George Flower spent his later years. George was a distinguished soldier and administrator, who ended his career as Governor and Constable of the new fort at Waterford, built in 1627. William's grandfather was Francis Flower, a "gentleman in attendance" on Sir Christopher Hatton, Lord Chancellor of England 1587–91; Francis was a contributor to the play The Misfortunes of Arthur by Thomas Hughes.

William succeeded to his father's estates about 1635; the principal family lands were at Durrow, County Laois and Finglas, County Dublin. He entered the Irish House of Commons as MP for Ballinakill in 1642, replacing Richard Fanshawe. During the Civil War he was able to secure a position as an officer on the staff of the Cromwellian General Michael Jones, Governor of Dublin. However, he fell under suspicion of being a Royalist, who was in secret correspondence with James Butler, 1st Duke of Ormonde, the exiled Royalist leader. He was arrested in 1648 and sent to England, where he spent some years in prison.

== Restoration ==
At the Restoration, it became clear that had always been a committed Royalist, thus fully justifying the Cromwellians' suspicions of him. He was almost certainly one of the party who had been working quietly (and successfully) to ensure that there would be no serious opposition to the Restoration in Ireland, and he helped to secure Dublin Castle for the King in early 1660. He re-entered the House of Commons as MP for St Canice (Irishtown), became a member of the Privy Council of Ireland, was knighted and received several grants of land under the Act of Settlement 1662, includes an estate at Ballybrittas, County Laois. He was a Commissioner for paying off the arrears of army pay, and later a Commissioner of Excise Appeals. He received a fresh army commission, became a lieutenant colonel in the King's Regiment of Guards, and is said to have seen active service in Ulster in old age. He probably died in 1681 or 1682.

== Character and family ==
Elrington Ball describes him as an attractive character; by his own admission he was "no scholar", but he was generous and hospitable, a good friend and family man and a kindly employer. He spoke Irish, which was no longer a common attribute among the Anglo-Irish gentry.

He married firstly Frances Weldon, widow of William Savage of Rheban Castle, near Athy, and daughter of Walter Weldon of St. John's Bower, County Kildare, MP for Athy in the Parliament of 1611–13 and his wife Jane Ryder, daughter of John Ryder, Bishop of Killaloe. They had four children, Thomas, Henry, William and Alice. The marriage is said to have been very happy, but after Frances' death in 1673 William remarried and had one further daughter Anne; little seems to be known of his second wife. Thomas by his first wife Mary Temple was the father of William Flower, 1st Baron Castle Durrow.

== Sources ==
- Ball, F. Elrington History of Dublin Vol. 6 University Press 1920
- Lodge, John Peerage of Ireland Dublin 1754
- Morrin, James Calendar of the Close and Patent Rolls of Chancery in Ireland of the reign of Charles I Public Record Office Dublin 1863
