= Robert Thomas Flower, 8th Viscount Ashbrook =

Irish aristocrat

Robert Thomas Flower 8th Viscount Ashbrook
- Born: 1 April 1836; Castle Durrow, Durrow, County Laois, Ireland
- Died: 9 March 1919 (aged 82)

Robert Thomas Flower, 8th Viscount Ashbrook (1 April 1836 – 9 March 1919) was an Anglo-Irish peer, Militia officer, and inventor.

== Biography ==
=== Early life ===
Robert Thomas Flower was born on 1 April 1836 at Castle Durrow, Durrow, County Laois, Ireland. His father was Henry Jeffrey Flower, 5th Viscount Ashbrook (1806–1871) and his mother was Frances (1803-1886), daughter of Sir John Robinson, Baronet. He had three sisters and two brothers, Henry Jeffrey Flower, 6th Viscount Ashbrook (1829–1882) and William Spencer Flower, 7th Viscount Ashbrook (1830–1906).

=== Career ===
He was commissioned into the part-time Royal Queen's County Rifle Militia (later 4th Battalion, Prince of Wales's Leinster Regiment (Royal Canadians)) as a Lieutenant on 6 June 1859 and resigned on 15 December 1888 as a Major with the honorary rank of Lieutenant-Colonel.

He invented an easy-to-use handloom for the unskilled and disabled, and a latch-hook needle that speeds up the weaving process. The techniques were used by Yvo Richard Vesey, 5th Viscount de Vesci (1881–1958), who opened a carpet factory and hired women to do the weaving. The carpets were sold at Harrods in London and at Marshall Field's in Chicago. They furnished the Mansion House, Dublin, the grandstand at Ascot and RMS Titanic.

He became the 8th Viscount Ashbrook and the 9th Baron Castle-Durrow on the death of his brother on 26 November 1906.

=== Personal life ===
He married Gertrude Sophia Hamilton, daughter of Reverend Sewell Hamilton, on 18 July 1866. They had five children:

- Hon. Frances Mary Flower (married Henry Ernest White).
- Hon. Eva Constance Gertrude Flower (unknown-1928).
- Hon. Gertrude Flower (unknown-1956).
- Llowarch Robert Flower, 9th Viscount Ashbrook (1870-1936).
- Hon. Reginald Henry Flower (1871-1938).

He resided at 22 Adelaide Crescent in Hove, East Sussex in the 1860s. From 1869 onwards, he resided at Knocknatrina House in County Laois, Ireland.

He died on 9 March 1919, his wife having predeceased him on 8 November 1911.

Peerage of Ireland
Preceded by William Flower	Viscount Ashbrook; 1906–1919	Succeeded by Llowarch Flower
