= William Spencer Flower, 7th Viscount Ashbrook =

Anglo-Irish peer (1830–1906)

The Right Honourable The Viscount Ashbrook
- 7th Viscount Ashbrook
- Predecessor: Henry Jeffrey Flower, 6th Viscount Ashbrook
- Successor: William Spencer Flower, 7th Viscount Ashbrook
- Born: William Spencer Flower; 23 March 1830
- Died: 26 November 1906 (aged 76)
- Spouse: Augusta Madeline Henrietta Marton
- Parents: Henry Jeffrey Flower, 5th Viscount Ashbrook, Frances Robinson

William Spencer Flower, 7th Viscount Ashbrook was an Anglo-Irish peer.

He was born on the 23 March 1830, the second son of Henry Jeffrey Flower, 5th Viscount Ashbrook and Frances Robinson. Initially his surname was Walker, as his father had changed his name to secure a legacy. On 15 July 1847 his surname was legally changed to Flower.

He succeeded to the title Viscount Ashbrook on the death of his brother on 14 December 1882.

He was an officer in the 52nd Foot Regiment

He was Deputy lieutenant for Queen's County.

== Family ==
He married Augusta Madeline Henrietta Marton, daughter of George Marton of Capernwray Hall, Lancaster on 25 June 1861, and they had two daughters, Lucy Adelaide Frances Flower and Adelaide Caroline Flower who both died as infants.

His sister, Caroline Gertrude Flower, married Augusta's brother George Marton in 1866.

== Death and Succession ==
He died on 26 November 1906 at Castle Durrow. His two daughters had predeceased him so he was succeeded by his brother, Robert Thomas Flower.

Peerage of Ireland
Preceded by Henry Jeffrey Flower	Viscount Ashbrook; 1882–1906	Succeeded by Robert Thomas Flower
