= Henry Jeffrey Flower, 4th Viscount Ashbrook =

Anglo-Irish peer

The Right Honourable The Viscount Ashbrook
- 4th Viscount Ashbrook
- Predecessor: William Flower, 3rd Viscount Ashbrook
- Successor: Henry Flower, 5th Viscount Ashbrook
- Born: Henry Jeffrey Flower; 6 November 1776
- Died: 4 May 1847 (aged 70)
- Spouses: Deborah Susananna Freind, Emily Metcalfe
- Parents: William Flower, 2nd Viscount Ashbrook, Elizabeth Ridge

Henry Jeffrey Flower, 4th Viscount Ashbrook was an Anglo-Irish peer.

Born on 6 November 1775 at the Manor, Shellingford, the second son of William Flower, 2nd Viscount Ashbrook and Elizabeth Ridge, he succeeded to the title on the death of his brother William on 6 January 1802.

He was one of the 42 original members of The Yacht Club in 1815, which became the Royal Yacht Squadron.

On 23 May 1832 he was appointed Lord of the Bedchamber to His Majesty William IV. The appointment ended in 1837, on the death of His Majesty.

== Family ==
=== with Deborah Freind ===
He married Deborah Susannah Freind on 26 May 1802 at St. George's Church, Hanover Square. She was the daughter of Reverend William Maxmillian Freind, rector of Chinnor, and Deborah Walker, daughter of Thomas Walker of Woodstock.

They lived in Fletcher's House, Park Street, Woodstock until moving to Beaumont Lodge in 1804. Fletcher's House was probably given to Deborah's grandfather, Thomas Walker, by the Duke of Marlborough, and is now the Oxfordshire Museum.

They had five children:

1. Susanna Sophia (1803–1864)
2. Henry Jeffrey (1806–1871) – 5th Viscount Ashbrook
3. Caroline (1807–1840)
4. William (1808–1813)
5. Harriet Elizabeth (1809–1827)

Deborah died on 24 March 1810.

Susanna Sophia married the Reverend William Robinson (1793–1834) on 21 May 1824.He was the second son of the Venerable Sir John Robinson, 1st Baronet of Rokeby Hall. They had one daughter, Caroline. Susanna's brother, Henry later married William's sister Frances.

=== with Emily Metcalfe ===
Henry married Emily Theophila Metcalfe, eldest daughter of Sir Thomas Metcalfe on 22 June 1812.

They had three daughters:

1. Augusta Emily (1816–1827)
2. Charlotte Augusta (1818–1860)
3. Sophia Georgiana (1820–1826)

His wife, Emily Theophila was a friend and correspondent of Princess Charlotte Augusta.

His daughter, Charlotte Augusta married George Spencer-Churchill, 6th Duke of Marlborough on 10 June 1846. They had two children, Almeric Athelstan, who died young, and Clementina Augusta who married John Pratt, 3rd Marquess Camden. Charlotte Augusta died on the 20 April 1850, and is buried at Blenheim Palace chapel.

== Death and succession ==
Henry Jeffrey died on 4 May 1847. His son Henry succeeded to the title Viscount Ashbrook.

His widow Emily Flower lived to 94 years old and died on 9 April 1885.

Of his children, only Susanna Sophia, Henry and Charlotte Augusta survived him.

Peerage of Ireland
Preceded by William Flower	Viscount Ashbrook; 1802–1847	Succeeded by Henry Jeffrey Flower
