= William Flower, 2nd Viscount Ashbrook =

Anglo-Irish peer

The Right Honourable The Viscount Ashbrook
- 2nd Viscount Ashbrook
- Predecessor: Henry Flower, 1st Viscount Ashbrook
- Successor: William Flower, 3rd Viscount Ashbrook
- Born: William Flower; 25 June 1744
- Died: 30 August 1780 (aged 36)
- Spouse: Elizabeth Ridge
- Parents: Henry Flower, 1st Viscount Ashbrook, Elizabeth Tatton

William Flower, 2nd Viscount Ashbrook (25 June 1744 – 30 August 1780) was an Anglo-Irish peer. The only son of Henry Flower, the 1st Viscount Ashbrook and Elizabeth Tatton, daughter of Lieutenant-General William Tatton, William was born at Castle Durrow, County Kilkenny, Ireland. His father died in 1752 when he was eight years old, and his mother in 1759, before he was fifteen. He was educated at Eton College and Christ Church, Oxford, where he matriculated on 29 November 1762.

== Marriage to Betty (Elizabeth) Ridge ==
In 1763, possibly while on a fishing expedition on the River Thames William met Betty Ridge. Her father was Thomas Ridge, born in Buckland around 1712 of a family who made their living from catching fish in the Thames and selling them in Oxford. He had leased Noah's Ark Island, and was keeper of a Flash lock, and a licensed victualler.

Noah's Ark Island

She was seventeen and he was nineteen, too young to marry without permission, as an orphan, from his maternal uncles, who were his guardians.

On 20 March 1766 William and Betty were married at the church of St Denys in Northmoor.

== Family ==
They lived at Shellingford Manor, and had six children who survived beyond infancy.

1. Elizabeth (1766-1847)
2. William (1767-1802) William Flower, 3rd Viscount Ashbrook
3. Harriet (1771-1813)
4. Caroline (1773-1844)
5. Sophia (1774-1794)
6. Henry Jeffrey (1776-1847) Henry Jeffrey Flower, 4th Viscount Ashbrook

In 1789 The eldest daughter, Elizabeth, married Francis Warneford of Highworth (brother of Samuel Wilson Warneford) and they had two daughters who survived infancy

1. Caroline Elizabeth (1792-1846)
2. Harriet Elizabeth (1803-1861) - married Sir Charles Wetherell.

The second eldest daughter, Harriet, married John Ellis Agar (1763-1797), second son of James Agar. Following his death she married Pryse Pryse on 20 July 1798, but died in a house fire on 14 January 1813.

The next daughter, Caroline, never married, but lived with her sister Elizabeth.

The final daughter, Sophia, died aged 20.

== Death ==
William died in August 1780 and was buried at Shellingford Church. There is a monument to him south of the chancel in the church. He left six children under 15 and a 35 year old widow.

His widow, Elizabeth, married Reverend Doctor John Jones, curate at Shellingford church, on 20 January 1790, and she died on 22 February 1808.

Peerage of Ireland
| Preceded by Henry Flower | Viscount Ashbrook; 1752–1780 | Succeeded by William Flower |
