= Llowarch Robert Flower, 9th Viscount Ashbrook =

Anglo-Irish peer

The Right Honourable The Viscount Ashbrook
- 9th Viscount Ashbrook
- Predecessor: Robert Thomas Flower, 8th Viscount Ashbrook
- Successor: Desmond Llowarth Edward Flower, 10th Viscount Ashbrook
- Born: Llowarth Robert Flower; 9 July 1870
- Died: 30 August 1936 (aged 66)
- Spouse: Gladys Higginson
- Parents: William Flower, 2nd Viscount Ashbrook, Elizabeth Ridge

Llowarch Robert Flower, 9th Viscount Ashbrook was an Anglo-Irish peer.

He was born on 9th July 1870, the eldest son of Robert Thomas Flower, 8th Viscount Ashbrook and Gertrude Sophia Hamilton, daughter of Reverend Sewell Hamilton.

He succeeded to the title Viscount Ashbrook on the death of his father, on 9th March 1919.

He was Deputy lieutenant for Queen's County.

== Family ==
He married Gladys Lucille Beatrice Higginson, daughter of Sir George Wentworth Alexander Higginson on 14th February 1899. They had a daughter, Eileen Augusta Sybil Flower who died, unmarried, in 1959 and a son Desmond Llowarch Edward Flower.

== Death and succession ==
He died on 30th August 1936 and was succeeded by his son Desmond.

Peerage of Ireland
Preceded by Robert Thomas Flower	Viscount Ashbrook; 1919-1936	Succeeded by Desmond Llowarch Edward Flower
