= Henry Flower, 1st Viscount Ashbrook =

Anglo-Irish peer (c. 1710–1752)

The Right Honourable The Viscount Ashbrook
- 1st Viscount Ashbrook
- Portrait of Henry Flower, 1st Viscount Ashbrook by Robert Hunter
- Successor: William Flower, 2nd Viscount Ashbrook
- Born: Henry Flower c. 1710
- Died: 27 June 1752 (aged 41–42)
- Spouse: Elizabeth Tatton
- Parents: William Flower, 1st Baron Castle Durrow, Edith Caulfeild

Henry Flower, 1st Viscount Ashbrook (c. 1710 – 27 June 1752) was an Anglo-Irish peer.

== Early life ==
The second son of William Flower, 1st Baron Castle Durrow and Edith Caulfeild, granddaughter of William Caulfeild, 1st Viscount Charlemont his elder brother Jeffrey, died in 1730. His health was a concern to his family as shown by a letter from his maternal Aunt Jane Martha Temple (Dowager countess of Portland) to his father in 1738, where he remains at Caen 'in reputation for their care of youth'.

== Family ==
He married Elizabeth, daughter of Lieutenant-General William Tatton in March 1740. They had two daughters, Elizabeth, who died, unmarried in 1831 and Mary, who married Reverend John Nicoll in 1788. Their son, William Flower was born 25 June 1744 at Castle Durrow. He succeeded to title Baron of Castle Durrow, becoming the 2nd Baron, on the death of his father, on 29 April 1746.

== Peerage ==
The title Viscount Ashbrook was created for him, and he became the 1st Viscount Ashbrook on 30 September 1751. He died on 27 June 1752, when the title Viscount Ashbrook was inherited by his son William. His widow, Elizabeth, died 10 February 1759.

Peerage of Ireland
New title	Viscount Ashbrook; 1751-1752	Succeeded by William Flower
