= Henry Jeffrey Flower, 5th Viscount Ashbrook =

Anglo-Irish peer

The Right Honourable The Viscount Ashbrook
- 5th Viscount Ashbrook
- Predecessor: Henry Jeffrey Flower, 4th Viscount Ashbrook
- Successor: Henry Jeffrey Flower, 6th Viscount Ashbrook
- Born: Henry Jeffrey Flower; 17 June 1806
- Died: 3 August 1871 (aged 65)
- Spouse: Frances Robinson
- Parents: Henry Jeffrey Flower, 4th Viscount Ashbrook, Deborah Susanna Freind

Henry Jeffrey Flower, 5th Viscount Ashbrook was an Anglo-Irish peer.

The son of Henry Jeffrey Flower, 4th Viscount Ashbrook and Deborah Susanna Friend, he was born on the 17th June 1806.

He was High Sheriff of County Kilkenny in 1834.

He succeeded to the title Viscount Ashbrook on death of his father on the 4th May 1847.

== Family ==
He officially changed his name to Henry Jeffrey Walker in 1827.

On 7th June 1828 he married Frances Robinson, 9th daughter of the Venerable Sir John Robinson, 1st Baronet of Rokeby Hall. His sister, Sophia Susanna Flower had previously married Frances's brother, William Robinson.

They had three daughters and three sons.

1. Henry Jeffrey (1829–1882) - 6th Viscount Ashbrook
2. William Spencer (1830–1906) - 7th Viscount Ashbrook
3. Robert Thomas (1836–1919) - 8th Viscount Ashbrook

In 1866 his youngest daughter, Caroline Gertrude Flower, married George Marton of Capernwray Hall.

== Death and succession ==
He died on 3 August 1871 and was succeeded by his eldest son, Henry Jeffrey.

Peerage of Ireland
Preceded by Henry Jeffrey Flower	Viscount Ashbrook; 1847-1871	Succeeded by Henry Jeffrey Flower
