= William Flower, 1st Baron Castle Durrow =

Anglo-Irish peer and politician

William Flower, 1st Baron Castle Durrow PC (Ire) (11 March 1685 – 29 April 1746) was an Anglo-Irish peer and politician.

== Political career ==
He sat as Member of Parliament (MP) for County Kilkenny from 1715 to 1727. Subsequently, he represented Portarlington until 1733, when he was raised to the peerage as "Baron Castle Durrow, of Castle Durrow in the County of Kilkenny". (At the time the manor of Durrow was an exclave of County Kilkenny; in 1842 it was transferred to Queen's County, later known as Laois.)

Flower was made High Sheriff of County Kilkenny in 1731, and was invested to the Privy Council of Ireland in 1735.

He owned a substantial property at Abercynrig in Brecon. He inherited it from his stepmother, the Welsh heiress Dorothea Jeffreys. She was the only daughter of Colonel John Jeffreys, first Master of the Royal Hospital Kilmainham, and widow of Arthur Turner (died 1684), judge of the Court of Common Pleas (Ireland). He built Castle Durrow, Durrow, County Laois, as his principal Irish residence: the family remained there until 1922.

Jonathan Swift praised him as "a gentleman of very good sense and wit".

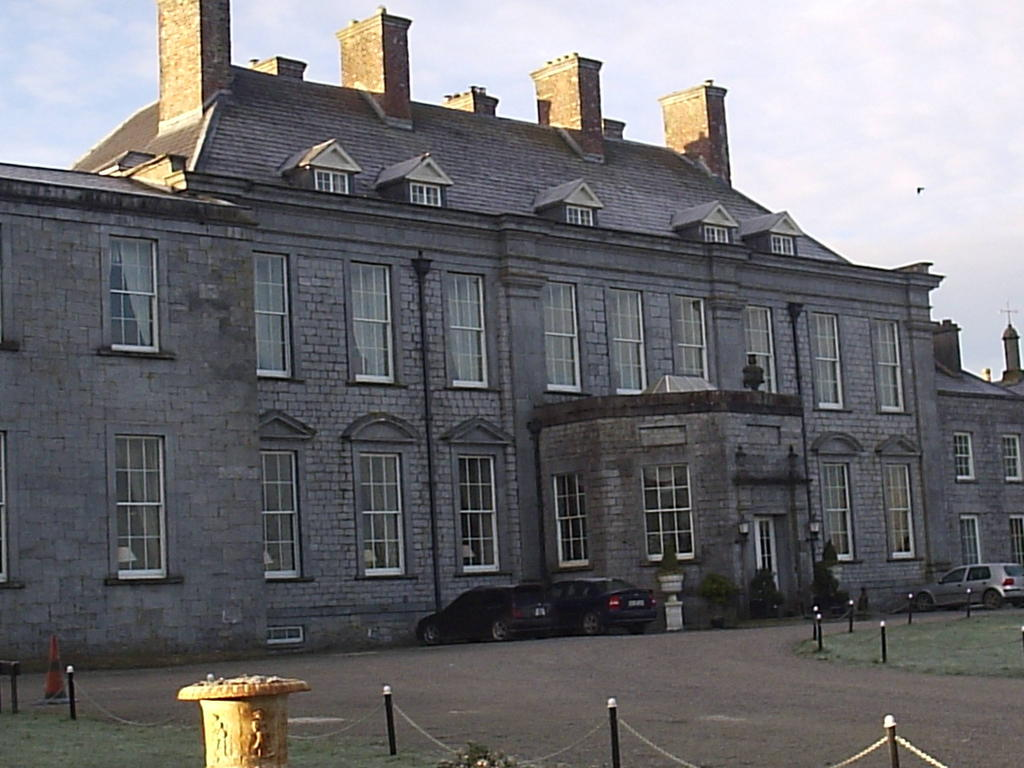
Castle Durrow

== Family ==
He was the only son of Thomas Flower of Finglas and his first wife Mary Temple, daughter of Sir John Temple, Speaker of the Irish House of Commons, and Jane Yarner. His paternal grandparents were Sir William Flower, MP and Privy Councillor, and Frances Weldon. Flower was educated at Christ Church, Oxford. He succeeded to his father's estates in 1700.

In 1717, Flower married Edith Caulfeild, daughter of Hon. Toby Caulfeild, a son of the 1st Viscount Charlemont and Rebecca Walsh. They had two daughters and two sons. His daughter Rebecca, married James Agar, a prominent County Kilkenny politician, and was the mother of six children, including George Agar, 1st Baron Callan.

Flower died in 1746 aged 61 and was buried at Finglas in County Dublin. His only surviving son Henry succeeded to the barony. and became the first Viscount Ashbrook in 1751.

Parliament of Ireland
Preceded by Sir Henry Wemys; William Ponsonby	Member of Parliament for County Kilkenny; 1715–1727; With: William Ponsonby 1715–1721; Patrick Wemyss 1721–1727	Succeeded by Hon. William Ponsonby; Patrick Wemyss
Preceded by Richard Warburton; Lancelot Sandys	Member of Parliament for Portarlington; 1727–1733; With: George Johnston 1727–1730; William Stannus 1730–1733	Succeeded by Lord George Sackville; William Henry Dawson
Peerage of Ireland
New creation	Baron Castle Durrow; 1733–1746	Succeeded by Henry Flower
