= Viscount Ashbrook =

Title in the peerage of Ireland

Viscountcy Ashbrook
- Blazon Arms: Quarterly 1st and 4th, Argent two Chevronels between three Ravens each having an Ermine Spot in its beak Sable and between the chevronels three Pellets; 2nd and 3rd, Gules three Towers Argent.
- Creation date: 30 September 1751
- Created by: King George II
- Peerage: Peerage of Ireland
- First holder: Henry Flower, 2nd Baron Castle Durrow
- Present holder: Michael Flower, 11th Viscount Ashbrook
- Heir apparent: Hon. Rowland Flower
- Remainder to: Heirs male of the first viscount's body, lawfully begotten
- Subsidiary titles: Baron Castle Durrow
- Seat: Arley Hall
- Former seats: Castle Durrow; Beaumont Lodge; Shellingford Manor
- Motto: Nens Conscia Recti ("A mind conscious of rectitude")

Viscount Ashbrook is a title in the Peerage of Ireland. It was created in 1751 for Henry Flower, 2nd Baron Castle Durrow. The title of Baron Castle Durrow, in the County of Kilkenny, had been created in the Peerage of Ireland in 1733 for his father William Flower. He was a Colonel in the Army and also represented County Kilkenny and Portarlington in the Irish House of Commons. He was praised by Jonathan Swift as "a gentleman of very great sense and wit". As of 2022, the titles are held by the eleventh Viscount, who succeeded his father in 1995.

The family seat is Arley Hall, near Arley, Cheshire. Until 1922, the principal seat of the family was Castle Durrow, near Durrow, County Kilkenny; in England they also owned Beaumont Lodge, near Old Windsor, Berkshire, and the manor of Shellingford in Shellingford, Berkshire (presently Oxfordshire).

== Barons Castle Durrow (1733) ==
- William Flower, 1st Baron Castle Durrow (1685–1746)
- Henry Flower, 2nd Baron Castle Durrow (died 1752) (created Viscount Ashbrook in 1751)

== Viscounts Ashbrook (1751) ==
- Henry Flower, 1st Viscount Ashbrook (1711–1752)
- William Flower, 2nd Viscount Ashbrook (1744–1780)
- William Flower, 3rd Viscount Ashbrook (1767–1802) buried at Shellingford
- Henry Jeffrey Flower, 4th Viscount Ashbrook (1776–1847)
- Henry Jeffrey Flower, 5th Viscount Ashbrook (1806–1871)
- Henry Jeffrey Flower, 6th Viscount Ashbrook (1829–1882)
- William Spencer Flower, 7th Viscount Ashbrook (1830–1906)
- Robert Thomas Flower, 8th Viscount Ashbrook (1836–1919)
- Llowarch Robert Flower, 9th Viscount Ashbrook (1870–1936)
- Desmond Llowarch Edward Flower, 10th Viscount Ashbrook, KCVO, MBE (1905–1995)
- Michael Llowarch Warburton Flower, 11th Viscount Ashbrook, MBE (b. 1935)

The heir apparent is the present Viscount's son the Hon. Rowland Francis Warburton Flower (b. 1975)
The heir-in-line is his son Benjamin Warburton Flower (b. 2006).

== Ancestry ==
Ancestors of Viscount Ashbrook

8. Robert Flower, 8th Viscount Ashbrook
4. Llowarch Flower, 9th Viscount Ashbrook
9. Gertrude Hamilton
2. Desmond Flower, 10th Viscount Ashbrook
10. Sir George Higginson
5. Gladys Higginson
1. Michael Flower, 11th Viscount Ashbrook
12. Piers Egerton-Warburton
6. John Egerton-Warburton
13. Hon. Antoinette Saumarez
3. Elizabeth Egerton-Warburton
14. Thomas Legh, 2nd Baron Newton
7. Hon. Lettice Legh
15. Evelyn Bromley-Davenport

== Bibliography ==
Godson, Julie Ann, "The Water Gypsy. How a Thames fishergirl became a viscountess" (FeedARead.com, 2014). A biography of Betty Ridge (1745–1808) who married William Flower, 2nd Viscount Ashbrook (1744–1780), and history of the Ridge and Flower families
