= RAF Shellingford =

Former RAF station in Oxfordshire, England

RAF Shellingford
- Shellingford, Oxfordshire in England

Site information
- Owner: Air Ministry
- Operator: Royal Air Force
- Controlled by: RAF Flying Training Command

Location
- Shown within Oxfordshire
- Coordinates: 51°38′20″N 1°31′33″W

Site history
- Built: 1941
- In use: 1941-1957
- Battles/wars: Second World War; Cold War

Airfield information
Runways
Direction	Length and surface
00/00	Concrete

RAF Shellingford was a Royal Air Force station located approximately 4 miles east of the town of Faringdon in Oxfordshire. It occupied land adjacent to the A417 road, between the villages of Shellingford and Stanford-in-the-Vale.

Much of the former aerodrome has now been given over to quarrying activities, where significant sand and gravel deposits continue to be extracted to this day. Some of the original technical buildings still exist, and can be seen from the road. Other parts of the aerodrome are given over to agricultural use, and a small industrial estate occupies the remainder of the site.

== Military use ==
RAF Shellingford was opened for use as a practice landing field for Elementary Flying Training in 1931, the aerodrome being of grass. It opened for night flying during the Second World War on 25 September 1941.

No. 3 Elementary Flying Training School RAF were located at RAF Shellingford with some 56 de Havilland Tiger Moths and a communal site was established for all ranks at nearby Stanford-in-the-Vale. British Army pilots trained here as glider pilots from 1943, the base being one of many assisting in the training of Airspeed Horsa Glider pilots in preparation for the D-Day landings of 1944.

No. 3 Maintenance Unit RAF was also here at some point.

Royal Netherlands Air Force pilots also received training at Shellingford in 1946.

No. 3 EFTS departed in 1948, the aerodrome closing on 31 March 1948 as the RAF gradually wound down following the war. However, the airfield was re-opened briefly for use by the United States Air Force in the 1950s.

USAF 7568 Material Squadron provided radar maintenance for the 32nd Antiaircraft Artillery Brigade whose task was to provide the air defence for all USAF SAC bases in the UK.

RAF Shellingford closed to the USAF in early 1957 with the 7568 MS moving to Denham Film Studios, near Uxbridge, as the 7500 Air Base Group.
