= Seán J. White =

Irish writer and broadcaster (1927–1996)

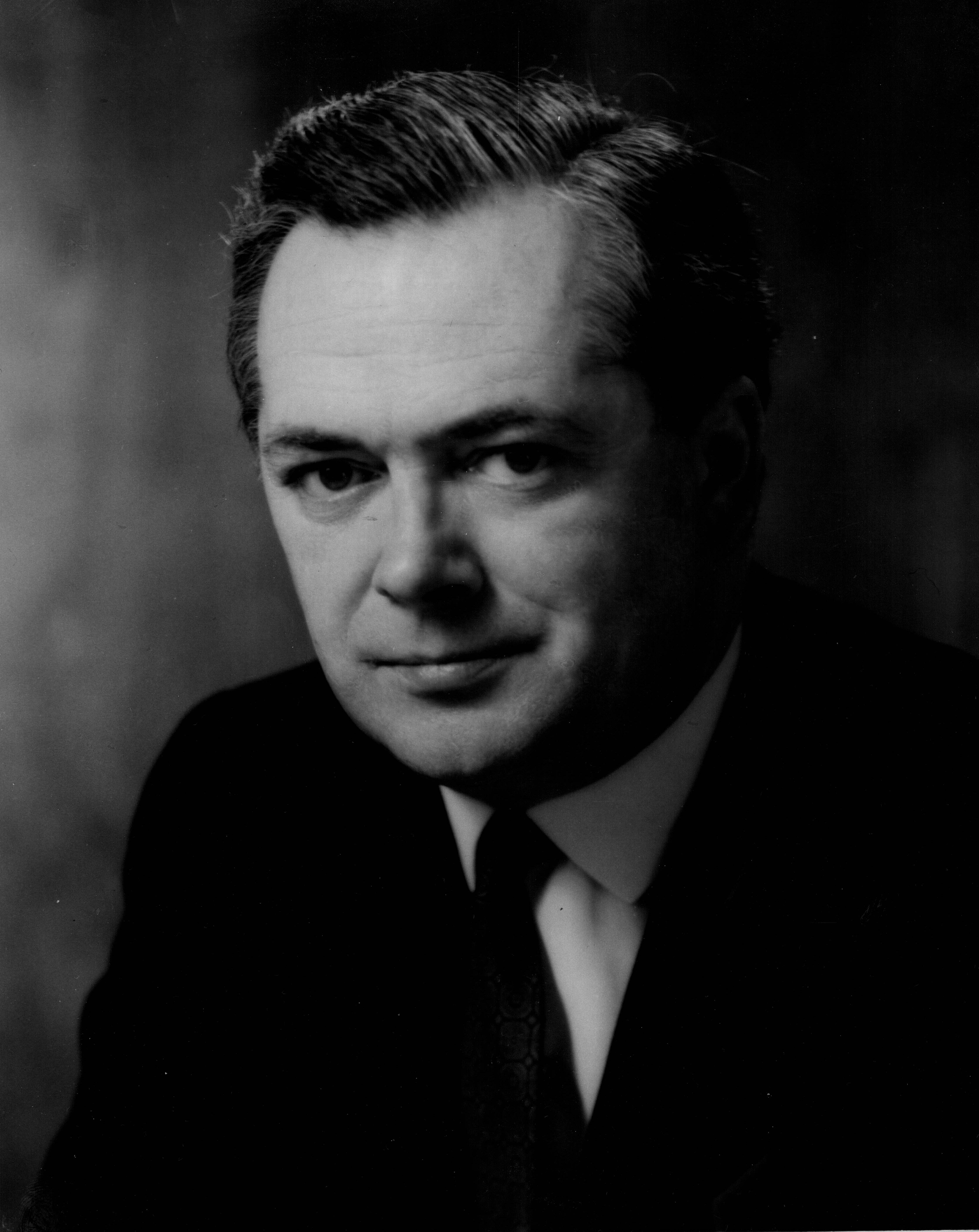
- White in 1970
- Born: 20 June 1927; Durrow, County Laois, Ireland
- Died: 6 September 1996 (aged 69); The Burren, County Clare, Ireland
- Occupations: Writer, academic, broadcaster, journalist
- Writing career
- Period: 1954–1996

Seán J. White (20 June 1927 – 6 September 1996) was an Irish writer, academic, broadcaster and journalist.

== Early life ==
Born in Durrow, County Laois, White was educated at Durrow National School and St Kieran's College, Kilkenny before moving on to St. Patrick's College, in Kiltegan, County Wicklow. He obtained a B.A. in English and Philosophy from University College Cork in September 1949 and a Higher Diploma in Education from University College Dublin in June 1950. He then completed a thesis on "Standish O'Grady and the Irish Literary Movement" and was awarded an M.A. degree with First-Class honours in December 1953. During this time he began teaching English at Catholic University School, University College Dublin and Maynooth College – the first layman to teach there since Éamon de Valera taught mathematics (1912–13). From 1954 to 1956 he also studied at the University of Oxford.

== Career ==
In 1954, he succeeded David Marcus as editor of Irish Writing, a literary quarterly specialising in new Irish writing and criticism. As such, he was instrumental in the publication of new work by Samuel Beckett, Brendan Behan, Thomas Kinsella and other Irish and British writers and poets. In 1958, he joined The Irish Press where – in addition to literary and theatre criticism – he wrote a regular column with his friend and colleague Benedict Kiely under the joint by-line of "Patrick Lagan". The pair traversed the country, collecting news of local festivals, traditions and characters. He was also a regular contributor to radio and television programmes on Raidió Teilifís Éireann, including several series on Shakespeare for school students.

In 1965 he joined Bord Fáilte – the Irish Tourist Board – as Senior Public Relations Officer. He moved to their New York office the following year as Publicity Director for North America. He returned to Ireland in 1970 to serve as Head of Information for CIÉ the Irish national transport body. In the same year he was appointed to the Taoiseach's Steering Committee, established by Jack Lynch in response to the Northern Ireland conflict and tasked with "the presentation of the Irish Government's point of view in Great Britain and elsewhere." It was in this capacity that – in the immediate aftermath of Bloody Sunday – he was asked to accompany Father Edward Daly to the United States to counter the British Government's version of the event which had gained primacy there. White's experience of and contacts in the U.S. media proved vital in securing interviews for Father Daly on prominent news programmes and allowing his eye-witness testimony to turn the tide of American opinion on the atrocity.

In 1977 he left CIÉ to concentrate on writing and broadcasting. On television, he wrote and presented an account of his childhood home Durrow entitled My Own Place (RTÉ) and a history of Skellig Michael entitled Sceilg Mhichíl: The Edge of Europe (BBC). On radio he was a regular contributor to the Thomas Davis Lectures, On This Day, Sunday Miscellany and Mo Cheol Thú on RTÉ as well as representing the Republic of Ireland, a guest team on Round Britain Quiz (BBC). For The Irish Times he wrote a regular feature entitled Outings as well as contributing to the magazine Ireland of the Welcomes.

In 1980 he was appointed Dean of The School of Irish Studies, a Dublin-based institution providing study abroad courses, principally for North American university students. In 1992 he was appointed adjunct professor, Irish Studies at the University of Limerick. During this time he continued to actively pursue the promotion of Irish literature and arts. He served on the board of Cumann Merriman for many years and was Director of the Merriman Summer School on three occasions. From 1982 he was Irish Trustee of the James Joyce International Foundation and was Director of the James Joyce XIII International Symposium in Dublin in June 1992. He served as a founding director of the James Joyce Centre and was elected a Shareholder of the Abbey Theatre.

From the early 1960s, one of his chief enthusiasms was The Burren region of County Clare. Indeed, for many years he worked towards a comprehensive study of the history, archaeology and topography of the region to be titled The Burren: The Fertile Rock which was never published. He did however support and advise the founders of the Burren College of Art as they were establishing the college and joined the faculty to lecture on Irish Studies. It was while leading a group of students on a visit to Black Head on the Burren that he died suddenly on 6 September 1996.
