= Scott baronets of Abbotsford (1820) =

Escutcheon of the Scott baronets of Abbotsford (1820)

The Scott baronetcy, of Abbotsford in the County of Roxburgh, was created in the Baronetage of the United Kingdom on 22 April 1820 for the author Sir Walter Scott. The title became extinct on the death of the second Baronet in 1847.

== Scott baronets, of Abbotsford (1820) ==
- Sir Walter Scott, 1st Baronet (1771–1832)
- Sir Walter Scott, 2nd Baronet (1801–1847), the son, who died without issue.

Baronetage of the United Kingdom
Preceded by Robinson baronets	Scott baronets of Abbotsford; 22 April 1820	Succeeded by Phillipps baronets

== See also ==
- Constable Maxwell-Scott baronets
