= John Freind Robinson =

English religious figure

John Freind Robinson, 1st Baronet (born Freind; 15 February 1754 – 16 April 1832) was Archdeacon of Armagh from 1786 until his resignation in 1797.

== Life ==
Robinson was the son of Dean William Freind; nephew of Archbishop Richard Robinson, 1st Baron Rokeby, and grandson of Robert Freind, headmaster of Westminster School. His mother was Grace Robinson and Freind became heir to her brother, who was created Baron Rokeby.

Freind was born in Witney, and was educated at Westminster School, and then Christ Church, Oxford. On 3 January 1774, he was appointed by his uncle, with his elder brother the Reverend William Maximilian Friend, as a Registrar of the Prerogative Court. In 1821 he resigned and was immediately re-appointed to the same position which was then granted to him for his life by Archbishop William Stuart on 25 April 1821. He was Prebendary of Tynan in Armagh Cathedral from 1778 to 1786; Archdeacon of Armagh from 1786 to 1797 and Precentor of Christ Church Cathedral, Dublin from 1797 to 1823.

Freind assumed, by sign manual, the surname of Robinson in 1793 to succeed to the estates of his uncle, Baron Rokeby. He was created a baronet on 14 October 1819.

== Family ==
Freind married in 1786 Mary Anne Spencer, daughter of James Spencer of Rathangan, County Kildare; they had a large family. Robert Spencer Robinson R.N. was one of the sons. His second eldest son, the Reverend William Robinson (1793-1834) married Susanna Sophia Flower, daughter of Henry Jeffrey Flower, 4th Viscount Ashbrook. One of his daughters, Frances Robinson (1803-1886) married Henry Jeffrey Flower, 5th Viscount Ashbrook. Another daughter, Selina Robinson (1807-1873) married the Reverend Sewell Hamilton, and their daughter, Gertrude Sophia Hamilton, married Robert Thomas Flower, 8th Viscount Ashbrook.

Baronetage of the United Kingdom
| New creation | Baronet (of Rokeby Hall); 1819–1832 | Succeeded by Richard Robinson |
