= George Brownrigg =

Irish-born English cricketer

Personal information
- Full name: George Neville Brownrigg
- Born: 16 July 1896; Durrow, Queen's County, Ireland
- Died: 20 January 1981 (aged 84); Westminster, London, England
- Batting: Unknown
- Bowling: Left-arm (unknown style)

Domestic team information
- Years: Team
- 1921–1922: Sussex

Career statistics
Competition	First-class
Matches	3
Runs scored	26
Batting average	8.66
100s/50s	–/–
Top score	11
Balls bowled	216
Wickets	4
Bowling average	25.75
5 wickets in innings	–
10 wickets in match	–
Best bowling	4/31
Catches/stumpings	2/–
- Source: Cricinfo, 12 February 2012

George Neville Brownrigg (16 July 1896 – 20 January 1981) was an Irish first-class cricketer. Brownrigg's batting style is unknown, while it is known he was a left-arm bowler, his exact bowling style is unknown. He was born at Durrow, Ireland.

Brownrigg made his first-class debut for Sussex against Oxford University in 1921. The following season he made two further first-class appearances in the 1922 County Championship against Warwickshire and Nottinghamshire. In his three first-class matches for Sussex, Brownrigg took 4 wickets at an average of 25.75, with best figures of 4/31. With the bat, he scored just 26 runs at a batting average of 8.66, with a high score of 11.

He died at Westminster, London on 20 January 1981.
