= Robinson baronets of Rokeby Hall (1819) =

Extinct baronetcy in the Baronetage of the United Kingdom

Robinson baronets
- Creation date: 1819
- Status: extinct
- Extinction date: 1910
- Arms: vert, on a chevron between three bucks trippant or and pelletée, three quatrefoils gules

The Robinson Baronetcy, of Rokeby Hall in the County of Louth, was created in the Baronetage of the United Kingdom on 14 October 1819 for the Reverend John Robinson, nephew of and heir of The 1st Baron Rokeby, formerly Church of Ireland Primate of All Ireland and Archbishop of Armagh. The title became extinct on the death of the fifth Baronet in 1910.

== Robinson baronets, of Rokeby Hall (1819) ==
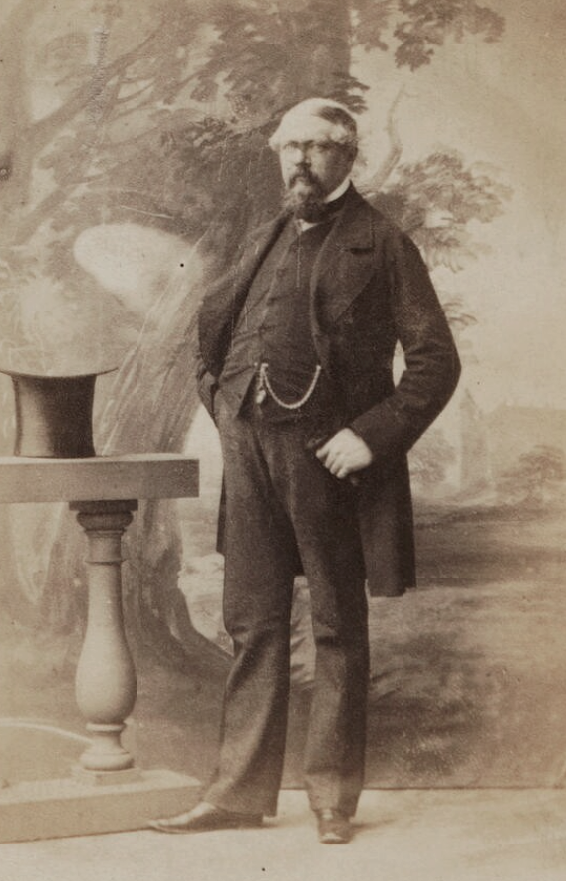
Sir John Stephen Robinson, 3rd Baronet, 1860 photograph

- Sir John Friend Robinson, 1st Baronet (1754–1832)
- Sir Richard Robinson, 2nd Baronet (1787–1847)
- Sir John Stephen Robinson, 3rd Baronet (1816–1895). On his death in 1895 he was succeeded by his younger son, his elder son having predeceased him.
- Sir Gerald William Collingwood Robinson, 4th Baronet (1857–1903). He was succeeded by his uncle as heir.
- Sir Richard Harcourt Robinson, 5th Baronet (1828–1910). He was the second son of the 2nd baronet, and died without heir.

== See also ==
- Robinson baronets

== Notes ==
Baronetage of the United Kingdom
| Preceded by Allan baronets | Robinson baronets of Rokeby Hall; 18 September 1819 | Succeeded by Scott baronets |
