= George Marton (1839–1905) =

English Conservative politician

George Blucher Heneage Marton (1839 – 18 August 1905) was an English Conservative politician.

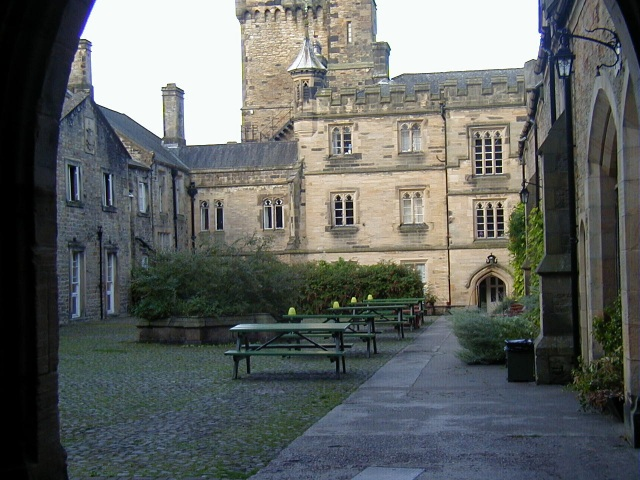
Capernwray Hall, home of the Marton family

Marton was the son of George Marton (1801–1867) of Capernwray Hall, Lancashire, and his wife Lucy Sarah Dallas, daughter of Sir Robert Dallas, Chief Justice of Common Pleas. He was Lieutenant-Colonel Commandant of the 3rd Battalion, King's Own Royal Regiment (Lancaster). Marton became a J.P. for Lancaster and Westmoreland, deputy lieutenant of Lancaster and High Sheriff of Lancashire in 1877.

In the 1885 general election, Marton was elected as Member of Parliament (MP) for the recreated Lancaster division of Lancashire. A petition was lodged against his election, but was dismissed. However, he lost the seat at the 1886 general election, against the national trend, and did not stand for the House of Commons again.

Marton married the Hon. Caroline Gertrude Flower, daughter of Henry Flower, 5th Viscount Ashbrook in 1866. He lived at Capernwray Hall, near Lancaster and died in 1905 at the age of 65.

Parliament of the United Kingdom
| New constituency Lancaster was disenfranchised in 1867 | Member of Parliament for Lancaster; 1885 – 1886 | Succeeded by James Williamson |
Honorary titles
| Preceded by Oliver Ormerod Walker | High Sheriff of Lancashire; 1877 | Succeeded by Nathaniel Eckersley |
