= Henry Jeffrey Flower, 6th Viscount Ashbrook =

Anglo-Irish peer (1829–1882)

The Right Honourable The Viscount Ashbrook
- 6th Viscount Ashbrook
- Predecessor: Henry Jeffrey Flower, 5th Viscount Ashbrook
- Successor: William Spencer Flower, 7th Viscount Ashbrook
- Born: Henry Jeffrey Flower; 26 March 1829
- Died: 14 December 1882 (aged 53)
- Spouse: Emily Abingdon
- Parents: Henry Jeffrey Flower, 5th Viscount Ashbrook, Frances Robinson

Henry Jeffrey Flower, 6th Viscount Ashbrook was an Anglo-Irish peer.

He was born on the 26th March 1829, the son of Henry Jeffrey Flower, 5th Viscount Ashbrook and Frances Robinson. Initially his surname was Walker, as his father had changed his name to secure a legacy. On 15th July 1847 he changed his surname to Flower.

In 1848 he was an ensign in the 52nd Foot Regiment.

He was High Sheriff of Queen's County in 1856.

He was elected a member of the Royal Yacht Squadron in May 1870, with his yacht Rainbow.

== Family ==
He married Emily Abingdon on 4th September 1860. They had a son, Henry Jeffrey Flower, born 27th December 1875, who predeceased him. He divorced Emily in 1877.

He died without surviving issue on 14 December 1882 at Castle Durrow, and the title Viscount Ashbrook passed to his brother William Spencer.

Peerage of Ireland
Preceded by Henry Jeffrey Flower	Viscount Ashbrook; 1871–1882	Succeeded by William Spencer Flower
