= Desmond Flower, 10th Viscount Ashbrook =

Irish peer and soldier

The Right Honourable The Viscount Ashbrook KCVO MBE JP DL
- 10th Viscount Ashbrook
- Predecessor: Llowarch Flower, 9th Viscount Ashbrook
- Successor: Michael Flower, 11th Viscount Ashbrook
- Born: Desmond Llowarch Edward Flower; 9 July 1905
- Died: 5 December 1995 (aged 90)
- Parents: Llowarch Flower, 9th Viscount Ashbrook Gladys Lucille Beatrice Higginson
- Occupation: Chartered accountant, soldier

Desmond Llowarch Edward Flower, 10th Viscount Ashbrook KCVO MBE JP DL (9 July 1905 – 5 December 1995) was an Anglo-Irish peer and soldier.

Flower was the only son of Llowarch Flower, 9th Viscount Ashbrook and his wife, Gladys Lucille Beatrice, daughter of George Higginson. He was educated at Eton College and went then to Balliol College, Oxford, where he graduated Bachelor of Arts in 1927. Ashbrook worked as a chartered accountant, succeeding to his father's titles on 30 August 1936. Before the Second World War, he joined 79th (Hertfordshire Yeomanry) Heavy Anti-Aircraft Regiment, Royal Artillery, of the Territorial Army, ending the war as a major. After the end of the war in 1945, he was appointed a Member of the Order of the British Empire.

In 1949 Flower was nominated a Deputy Lieutenant for the county of Cheshire and, in 1961, vice lord-lieutenant. From 1946, he represented the county also as a Justice of the Peace, retiring from these posts in 1968. Flower joined the council of the Duchy of Lancaster in 1957. He was invested as a Knight Commander of the Royal Victorian Order in 1977 on his retirement from the Council of the Duchy of Lancaster and was director of the Country's Gentlemen Association.

== Family ==
On 8 November 1934, he married Elizabeth (1911–2002), daughter of Captain John Egerton-Warburton; they had three children, two sons and a daughter. Flower died in 1995 and was succeeded in the viscountcy by his son, Michael.

In 2022, a new rose variety, the 'Elizabeth Ashbrook', was named in the late Lady Ashbrook's honour.

Peerage of Ireland
Preceded by Llowarch Flower	Viscount Ashbrook; 1936–1995	Succeeded by Michael Flower
