= Shellingford =

Village in Oxfordshire, England

Coordinates: 51.640°N 1.542°W

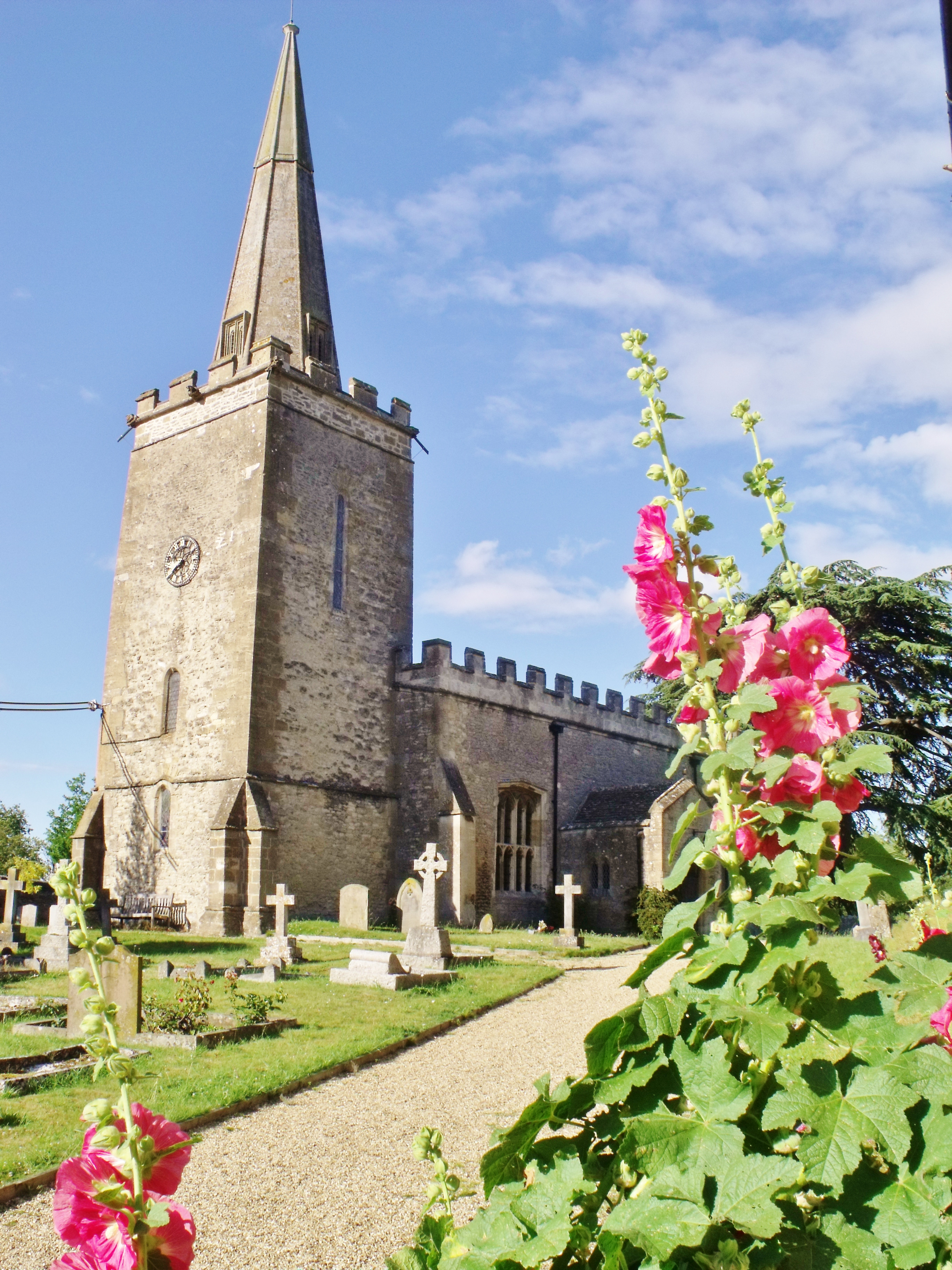
- St Faith's parish church

- Location within Oxfordshire
- Population: 173 (2011 Census)
- OS grid reference: SU3193
- Civil parish: Shellingford
- District: Vale of White Horse
- Shire county: Oxfordshire
- Region: South East
- Country: England
- Sovereign state: United Kingdom
- Post town: Faringdon
- Postcode district: SN7
- Dialling code: 01367
- Police: Thames Valley
- Fire: Oxfordshire
- Ambulance: South Central
- UK Parliament: Didcot and Wantage

Shellingford, historically also spelt Shillingford, is a village and civil parish about 2 1/2 miles (4 km) southeast of Faringdon in the Vale of White Horse in Oxfordshire, England. It was part of Berkshire until the 1974 Local Government Act transferred it to Oxfordshire. The 2011 Census recorded the parish's population as 173.

In the 10th century the toponym was spelt Scaringaford and in the 11th century it was Serengeford. 13th century forms of the name included Salingeford, Schalingeford, Shallingford, Sallingford and Schillingford. In the 18th century it was recorded as Shillingworth. The spelling Shillingford has been discontinued to avoid confusion with the village of Shillingford near Wallingford, also in Oxfordshire.

== History ==
Abingdon Abbey held the manor of Shellingford from 931 to 1538. In 1598 the courtier Sir Henry Neville bought the manor. He installed John Parkhurst as rector in 1602: Parkhurst was later master of Balliol College, but returned to Shellingford in 1637, and is buried at St Faith's Church. The manor was later held by the Packer family. In 1738 Sarah Churchill, Duchess of Marlborough bought it as an investment. It was later held by the Goodlake and Ashbrook families.

In 1867, the Goodlakes built a new house to the north of the village, Kitemore House, to replace the Elizabethan manor house south of the church, which was then demolished. In 1894, the estate was sold to Sir Alexander Henderson (later Lord Faringdon) of Buscot House. It was used as a military hospital during World War I. In the 1920s, Kitemore House was the home of Sir Alexander's son, Major Harold G. Henderson M.P.

Between 1931 and 1957 there was an aerodrome, RAF Shellingford, between Shellingford and Stanford in the Vale. A quarry now occupies part of the site.

== Parish church ==
The Church of England parish church of Saint Faith has a late 12th century Norman nave and chancel. The church still has its Norman chancel arch, south door, priest's door and part of the north door. The west tower is an Early English Gothic addition from the early part of the 13th century. In the 14th century the chancel was rebuilt with Decorated Gothic windows and a Decorated window was inserted in the south wall of the nave. In about 1400 a chapel was added to the north side of the chancel, but it does not survive. The tower arch was rebuilt in the 15th century. Early in the 16th century two four-light Perpendicular Gothic windows were inserted in the south wall of the nave and another Perpendicular window was inserted in the north wall of the chancel.

The spire and south porch were added in 1625 and three windows in the north wall of the nave were probably added at the same time. The spire was destroyed by lightning in 1848 and rebuilt in 1852. The church contains a number of monuments, including one to William, 2nd Viscount Ashbrook(1767–1802) by John Flaxman. St Faith's is a Grade I listed building.

The tower seems to have had a ring of four bells by the early part of the 20th century. The tenor bore the date 1586 but the founder was unidentified. Edward Neale of Burford cast the treble in 1653. Another bell bore no date but may have been cast in about 1599. Henry III Bagley, who had foundries at Chacombe and Witney, cast the final bell of the four in 1738. There is also a Sanctus bell that was cast in 1663. In the 20th century the ring was increased to six, but of the original bells only the Bagley and undated bells survive. Mears & Stainbank of the Whitechapel Bell Foundry cast the current tenor in 1920. In 1998 the Whitechapel Bell Foundry cast the present treble and another bell. There is also another bell from the Whitechapel foundry, cast by Thomas II Mears in 1841. St Faith's is now part of the Benefice of Uffington, Shellingford, Woolstone and Baulking.

== Gallery ==
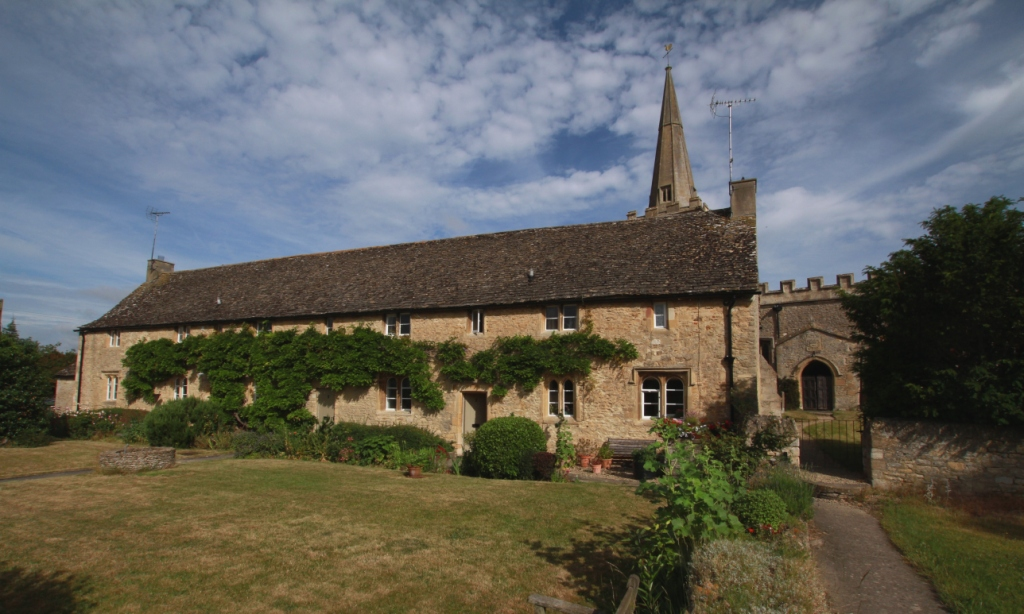
Timber Yard Cottages, a row of Tudor homes in Shellingford built in the 1560s

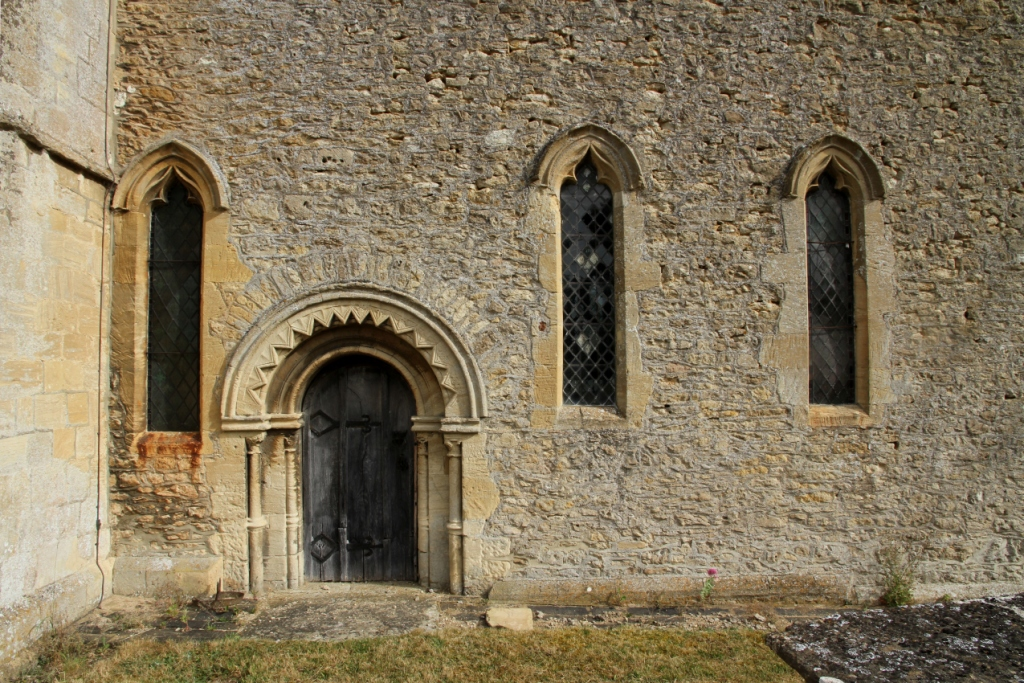
Part of the south wall of the chancel of St Faith's church, showing the 12th-century Norman priest's door and 14th-century Decorated Gothic windows

== Sources ==
- Page, W.H.; Ditchfield, P.H., eds. (1924). A History of the County of Berkshire. Victoria County History. Vol. 4. assisted by John Hautenville Cope. London: The St Katherine Press. pp. 475–478.
- Pevsner, Nikolaus (1966). Berkshire. The Buildings of England. Harmondsworth: Penguin Books. pp. 214–215.
