= Durrow, County Laois =

Village in County Laois, Ireland

Durrow Darú
- Village
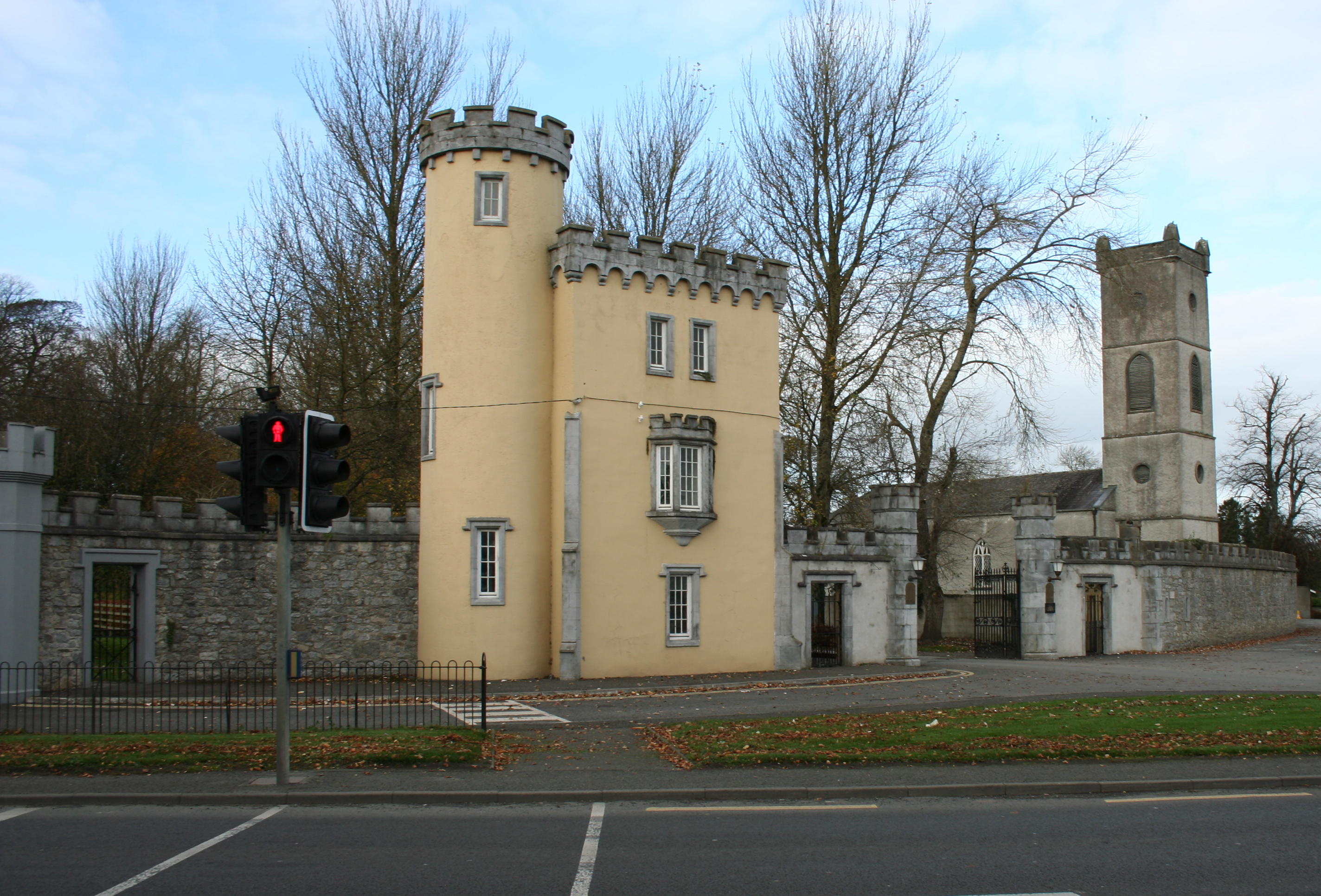
- Gate lodge at the entrance to Castle Durrow

- Location in Ireland
- Coordinates: 52.8442°N 07.3925°W
- Country: Ireland
- Province: Leinster
- County: County Laois
- Elevation: 95 m (312 ft)

Population (2016)
  - Total: 835
- Irish Grid Reference: S405773
- Website: www.durrow.ie

Durrow (Irish: Darú, formerly Darmhagh Ua nDuach) is a village located in south-east County Laois, Ireland. Bypassed by the M8 motorway on 28 May 2010, the village is located on the R639 road at its junction with the N77. The River Erkina flows through Durrow and joins the River Nore about 1.5 km east of the village.

The village takes its name from the Irish Darmhagh Ua nDuach (meaning 'the oak plain [in the territory] of Ui Duach'). It is in a civil parish of the same name.

== History ==
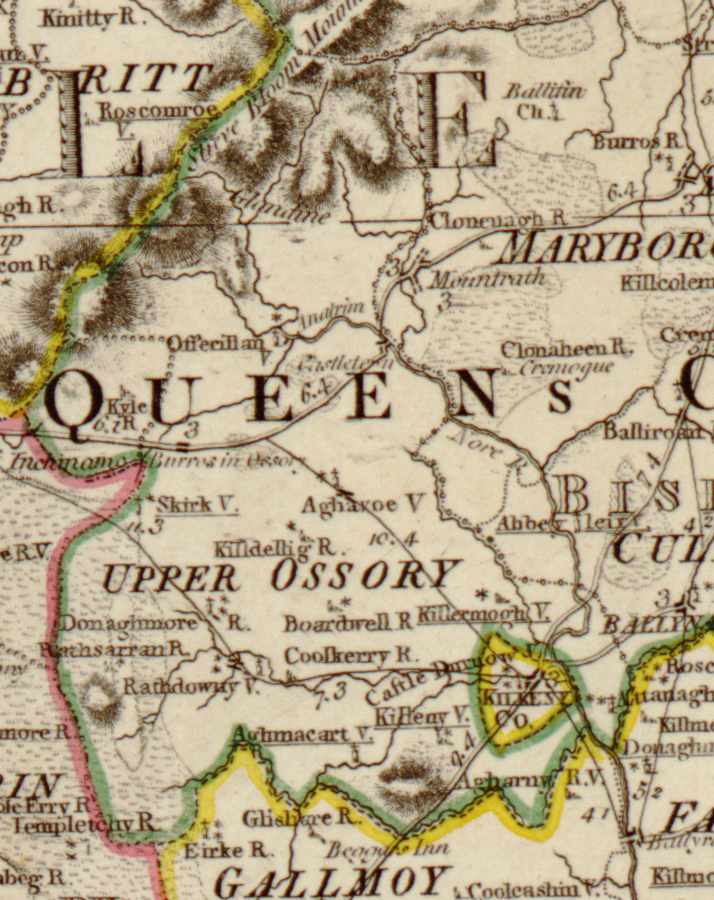
Durrow (yellow circle at lower right) was an exclave of County Kilkenny until 1842.

The earliest recorded church in the village was in 1155. Evidence from the Archaeological Survey carried out by the Office of Public Works in 1995 suggests that this area has been visited, if not inhabited, since as early as the Bronze Age. An urn-burial found on the lands of Moyne Estate dates roughly to the same period as those found at iron mills and Ballymartin (900–1400BC). Fulachta Fiadh (early cooking sites) have been identified at Aharney and near Ballacolla. The ringforts and other enclosures that dot the landscape indicate a more permanent, if dispersed, settlement of the land by the Celts (500BC–500AD). At some point, the land was part of the Kingdom of Ossory, and remained so as part of Upper Ossory into the seventeenth century.

Numerous religious settlements in the area date back to the 6th century. While the monastery founded by St. Fintan on the banks of the Erkina is perhaps the best known, evidence exists for similar establishments at Dunmore, Clonageera, Dereen, the Course wood, Tinweir, Ballinaslee, Tubberboe and Newtown.

The coming of the Anglo-Normans in the 12th century sounded the death knell for many of these early Christian settlements and the lands were subsumed into the Manor of Durrow, an Episcopal Manor for the Bishops of Ossory. This development sowed the seeds for the establishment of the town of Durrow. In 1245, Geoffrey de Turville, Bishop of Ossory from 1244 to 1250, was granted permission from the King of England to hold a yearly fair at Durrow manor for six days beginning on St. Swithin's Day and a weekly market on Thursdays.

After the Reformation, the manor passed into the ownership of the Earl of Ormond. In 1600, when Upper Ossory was made part of Queen's County (now Laois), Ormond ensured that Durrow remained an enclave of County Kilkenny where he was based. Ormond released the manor on 19 February 1708 to "William Flower and his heirs, forever". It was under the patronage of Flower and his descendants, the Lords Ashbrook, that the present town developed and prospered. In 1841–42 it was transferred from Kilkenny to Queen's County.

== Climate ==
A weather station broadcasts from Durrow providing real-time data. The station was set up in May 2008. It is a Davis ProVantage 2 station and monitors temperature, rain, wind, wind direction, humidity and atmospheric pressure. Also, a Met Éireann climate station (472) was installed in 2010 and the observations are sent to Dublin on a monthly basis. The climatological station measures rainfall in a manual gauge, soil temperatures at depths of 5 cm, 10 cm and 20 cm, and air temperatures including wet-bulb, daily max, daily min and grass minimum temperatures. The station is envisaged to last thirty years and establish a climate profile for Durrow.

The weather of the town can be described as temperate with rare extremes when compared to other locations around the world. However, when looking at the observations and comparing it to other locations around Ireland it is notable that Durrow is amongst the warmest locations in the country during the summer and the coldest in winter. The record high temperature of 32.1c was recorded during the heatwave of Mid-August 2022 and set a new National record for Ireland for the month of August, whilst the record low temperature of -14.0c was recorded on Christmas morning 2010.

The table below was last updated on 16 August 2022.

Climate data for Durrow Met Éireann Station 472 Weather Observing Station 2010 – 2022 (Extremes January 2010 to 2022)
Month	Jan	Feb	Mar	Apr	May	Jun	Jul	Aug	Sep	Oct	Nov	Dec	Year
Record high °C (°F)	15.7 (60.3)	15.0 (59.0)	19.8 (67.6)	22.8 (73.0)	25.4 (77.7)	31.3 (88.3)	31.2 (88.2)	32.1 (89.8)	28.3 (82.9)	20.5 (68.9)	16.8 (62.2)	14.8 (58.6)	32.1 (89.8)
Mean daily maximum °C (°F)	7.9 (46.2)	8.3 (46.9)	10.5 (50.9)	12.8 (55.0)	15.7 (60.3)	18.3 (64.9)	20.0 (68.0)	19.7 (67.5)	17.3 (63.1)	13.7 (56.7)	10.2 (50.4)	8.2 (46.8)	13.6 (56.5)
Daily mean °C (°F)	4.8 (40.6)	5.0 (41.0)	6.7 (44.1)	8.4 (47.1)	10.9 (51.6)	13.7 (56.7)	15.5 (59.9)	15.2 (59.4)	13.0 (55.4)	10.0 (50.0)	6.9 (44.4)	5.1 (41.2)	9.6 (49.3)
Mean daily minimum °C (°F)	1.7 (35.1)	1.7 (35.1)	2.9 (37.2)	4.0 (39.2)	6.1 (43.0)	9.1 (48.4)	11.0 (51.8)	10.7 (51.3)	8.7 (47.7)	6.3 (43.3)	3.6 (38.5)	2.0 (35.6)	5.6 (42.1)
Record low °C (°F)	−11.3 (11.7)	−5.6 (21.9)	−9.7 (14.5)	−6.3 (20.7)	−2.4 (27.7)	0.6 (33.1)	4.1 (39.4)	2.6 (36.7)	−1.6 (29.1)	−3.4 (25.9)	−8.7 (16.3)	−14.0 (6.8)	−14.0 (6.8)
Average rainfall mm (inches)	92.0 (3.62)	67.0 (2.64)	71.0 (2.80)	62.0 (2.44)	65.0 (2.56)	66.0 (2.60)	65.0 (2.56)	81.0 (3.19)	72.0 (2.83)	100.0 (3.94)	90.0 (3.54)	89.0 (3.50)	920.0 (36.22)
Average rainy days (≥ 1.0mm)	13	12	12	10	11	10	9	10	10	13	12	13	135
Average snowy days	3.6	3.6	2.5	0.8	0.1	0.0	0.0	0.0	0.0	0.0	0.1	2.0	12.8
Average relative humidity (%)	80	74	68	64	64	65	65	66	69	76	78	82	71
Mean monthly sunshine hours	55.8	64.4	99.2	147.0	173.6	147.0	145.7	145.7	124.0	93.0	66.0	49.6	1,314

== Sport ==
The local Gaelic Athletic Association club, The Harps, was formed in the 1980s following the amalgamation of former clubs representing Durrow and nearby Cullohill. Lions A.F.C. was a local soccer club which, as of 2022, had folded.

Laois Kayak and Canoe Club is a kayaking club based in the area.

== Transport ==
TFI Local Link routes 828 and 858, operated by JJ Kavanaghs as of 2021, serve Durrow on the Portlaoise to Cashel and Thurles route. Slieve Bloom Coaches operate a town link service, from Borris in Ossory to Portlaoise, which serves the town. This used to only operate on weekdays, but was extended to operate on weekends and bank holidays. Bus Éireann's Expressway and Aircoach service between Dublin and Cork ceased to serve Durrow in June 2012. As an interim measure until November 2012, Bus Éireann operated a shuttle service (route 128) to connect with Expressway services at Portlaoise.

== Amenities ==
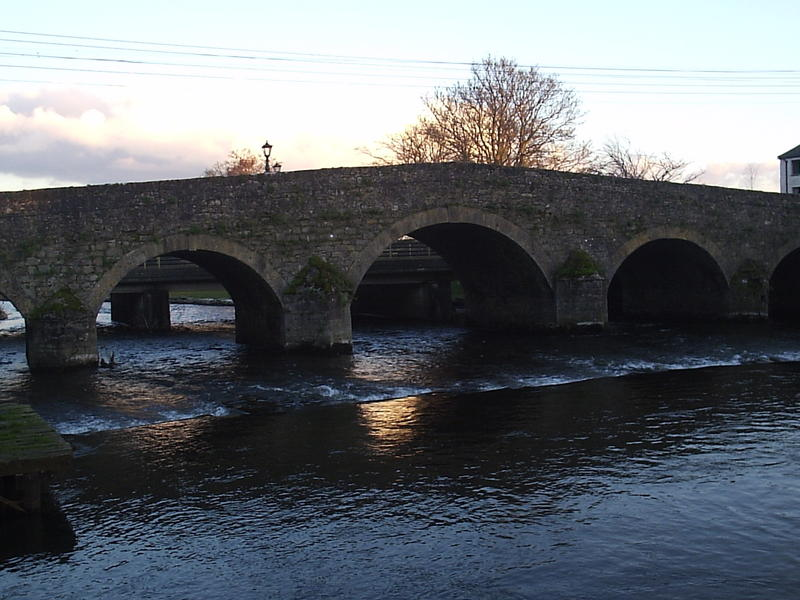
The old bridge over river Erkina on the outskirts of Durrow

There are a number of walks and cycle paths around the Durrow area. These include the Leafy Loop which runs by the River Nore. There is also woodland in the vicinity of Durrow, such as Bishops Wood, which extends on both sides of the R693 regional road (Dublin - Cork road). The river Erkina, a tributary of the River Nore, is also in the area.

== Scarecrow festival ==
Durrow's "Scarecrow Festival" takes place during the summer, and involves people from the area making their own scarecrows. The festival first took place in 2009, and was nominated for "Best Festival of 2012 and 2013" in the Irish Times Ticket Awards. The 2020 and 2021 events were cancelled as part of the response to the COVID-19 pandemic in Ireland.

== People ==
- George Brownrigg (1896–1981), first-class cricketer
- William Carrigan (1860–1924), priest and historian who was born in County Kilkenny and was a Roman Catholic parish priest in Durrow
- Arthur Moore (1765–1846), politician and judge
- Seán J. White (1927–1996), writer, academic, broadcaster and journalist
- Thomas A. White (1931–2017), Roman Catholic archbishop and diplomat

== See also ==
- Castle Durrow
- List of towns and villages in Ireland
