= Castle Durrow =

Irish country house built in the early 18th century

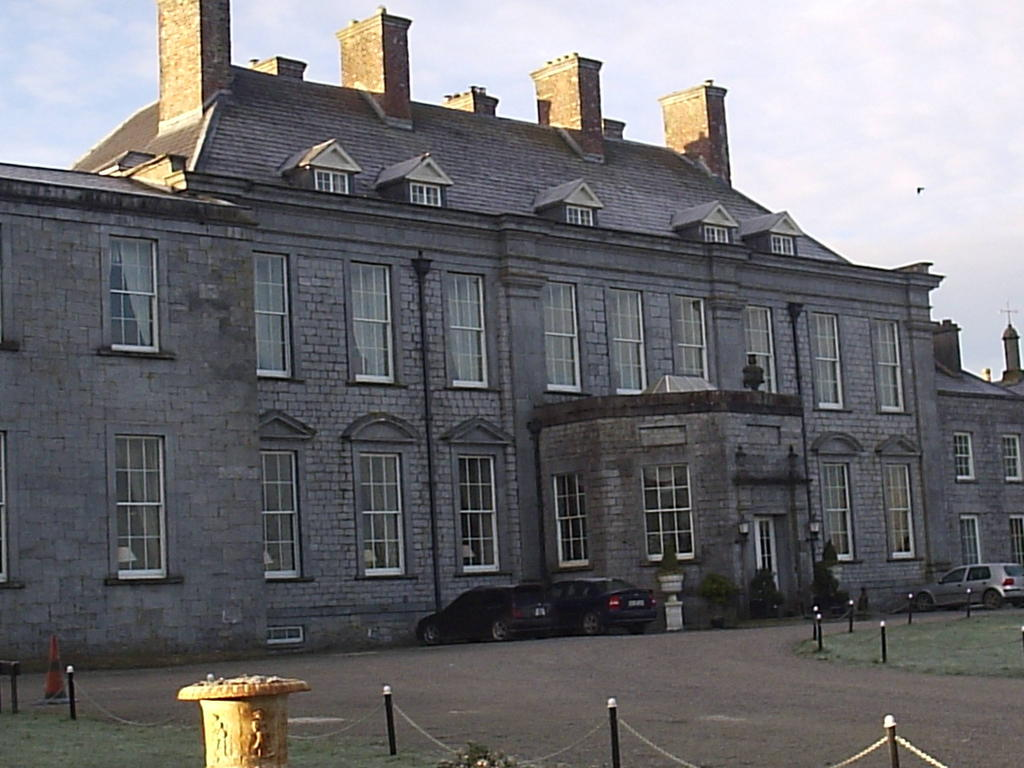

- Location within Ireland

General information
- Status: Hotel
- Type: House
- Architectural style: Georgian; Queen Anne
- Location: Durrow, County Laois, Ireland
- Coordinates: 52.846038°N 7.401206°W
- Construction started: 1712
- Estimated completion: 1726

Height
- Height: 30 m (98 ft)

Technical details
- Material: limestone
- Floor count: 3

Design and construction
- Developer: William Flower, 1st Baron Castle Durrow
- Main contractor: Benjamin Crawley; John Coltsman (assistant)

Castle Durrow is an 18th-century country house in Durrow, County Laois, Ireland. The house was built in the pre-Palladian design and formal gardens that were popular in the 18th century.

== History ==
The house was built between 1712-1716 by Colonel William Flower (from 1733 Baron Castle Durrow) as a family home. In 1751 William's son Henry was created first Viscount Ashbrook, also in the Irish peerage, and the title is still extant, being held by his direct heir, Michael Flower, eleventh Viscount Ashbrook (b. 1935).

A large castellated tudor revival gate lodge was constructed for the house and grounds around 1835.

The Flower family retained ownership of the estate until 1922, when they were forced to sell up and ultimately moved to England. The Bank of Ireland then took ownership of the estate.

It was bought by a Mr. Maher of Freshford, County Kilkenny who was primarily interested in the estate's timber reserves. Eventually, the Irish Land Commission took over the arable portion of the property and the Forestry Department took over the woodland.

Over 650 acres of forest were cleared surrounding the house between 1922 and 1928 including old forests of oak and ash.

After standing empty for some years the house itself was bought by the parish of Durrow for £1,800 and transformed in 1929 into a school as St Fintan's College and Convent, and remained in use for that purpose until 1987.

The house was put up for sale in 1992.

In 1998, the house was purchased by Peter and Shelley Stokes and redeveloped as the Castle Durrow Country House Hotel.

== Bibliography ==
- Godson, Julie Ann, "The Water Gypsy. How a Thames fishergirl became a viscountess" (FindARead.com, 2014). A biography of Betty Ridge (1745–1808) who married the 2nd Viscount Ashbrook (1744–1780), and history of the Ridge and Flower families
